= 2000 in Israel =

- Decades: 1980s; 1990s; 2000s; 2010s; 2020s
- See also: History of Israel; Timeline of Israeli history; List of years in Israel

Events in the year 2000 in Israel.

== Incumbents ==
- President of Israel – Ezer Weizman to July 13, Avraham Burg acting president July 13 to August 1, Moshe Katsav from August 1
- Prime Minister of Israel – Ehud Barak
- President of the Supreme Court – Aharon Barak
- Chief of General Staff – Shaul Mofaz
- Government of Israel – 28th Government of Israel

== Events ==
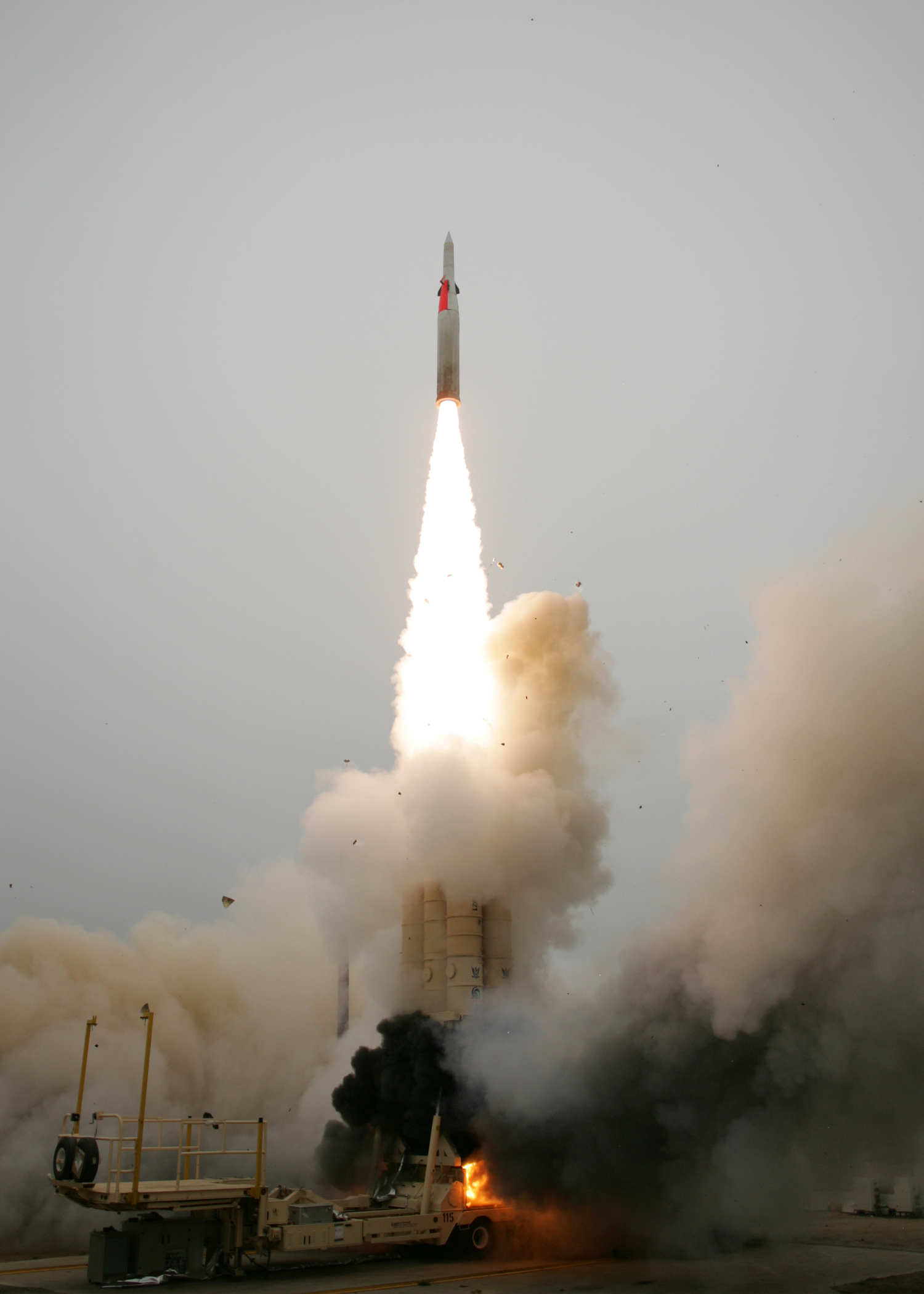
March 14: Israel formally deploys its Arrow 2 anti-ballistic missile system.

=== January ===
- January 3–10 – Shepherdstown Summit: Israel and Syria hold peace talks in Shepherdstown, West Virginia. Israeli Prime Minister Ehud Barak led the Israeli delegation and Foreign Minister Farouk al-Sharaa led the Syrian delegation. The Peace Conference finally came to a dead end and was later on followed by failed negotiation attempts to renew it.
- January 28 – Yes, the sole satellite television provider (DBS) in Israel, begins its broadcasting.

=== March ===
- March 12–26 – Pope John Paul II visits Israel, and thus becomes the second pope to visit Israel. During his stay, the Pope visits Yad Vashem (the Israeli national Holocaust memorial) and the Western Wall placing a letter inside it in which he prayed for forgiveness for the actions against Jews in the past.
- March 14 – Israel formally deploys its Arrow 2 anti-ballistic missile system.
- March 27 – An Israeli Air Force F-16D-30F of 109 Squadron (Israel) based at Ramat David Airbase, crashes into the Mediterranean Sea during a training flight 17 nmi (31 km) off the coastal village of Atlit in northern Israel. The pilot, Major Yonatan Begin, was a son of parliamentarian Benny Begin and grandson of former Prime Minister Menachem Begin. Neither he nor his co-pilot, Lt. Lior Harari, had notified their ground controllers of any problems.
- March 28 – A police investigation recommends that former prime minister Benjamin Netanyahu and his wife be indicted on criminal charges of fraud, bribery, theft of state gifts and obstruction of justice.

=== May ===
- 13 May – Ping Pong represents Israel at the Eurovision Song Contest with the song “Sameach” ("Happy").
- May 25 – Israel withdraws IDF forces from the "security zone" in southern Lebanon, in compliance with U.N. Resolution 425, to the international border after 22 years in which the area was occupied by Israeli forces. Several thousand members of the South Lebanon Army (and their families) withdraw to Israel as well with the Israeli forces. Syria and Lebanon insist that the withdrawal is incomplete, claiming the Shebaa Farms as Lebanese and still under occupation. The UN certifies full Israeli withdrawal.

=== June ===
- June 16 – Israel complies with UN Security Council Resolution 425 after 22 years of it issuance, which calls on Israel to completely withdraw from Lebanon. Israel withdraws from all of Lebanon, except the disputed Shebba farms.

=== July ===
- July 13 – Ezer Weizman resigns as president. Knesset Speaker, Avraham Burg is appointed as acting president.
- July 31 – The Israeli Knesset elects Moshe Katsav as the eighth president of the State of Israel, by a majority of 63 to 57, against Shimon Peres, to assume office on August 1, 2000.

=== August ===
- August 1 – Moshe Katsav assumes office as the eighth president of the State of Israel.

=== September ===
- September 3 – Former leader of Israel's Shas Party Aryeh Deri starts his three-year jail sentence after his appeal is rejected.

=== October ===
- October 1–9, 2000: Solidarity demonstrations held by Arab citizens of Israel escalate into clashes with Israeli police and Israeli Jewish citizens. Twelve Israeli Arabs and one Palestinian Arab from the Gaza Strip are shot and killed by the Israeli police. One Israeli Jewish civilian was killed by a rock thought to have been thrown by an Arab citizen.
- October 7 – 2000 Hezbollah cross-border raid: Three Israeli soldiers are abducted by Hezbollah while patrolling the Israeli administered side of the Israeli-Lebanese border and Northern Israel is shelled in an attempt to ignite the Israeli-Lebanese border too, but Israelis decide on limited response.

=== December ===
- December 10 – Prime minister Ehud Barak announces his resignation as prime minister, and states that an election for the post would be held soon.

=== Israeli–Palestinian conflict ===
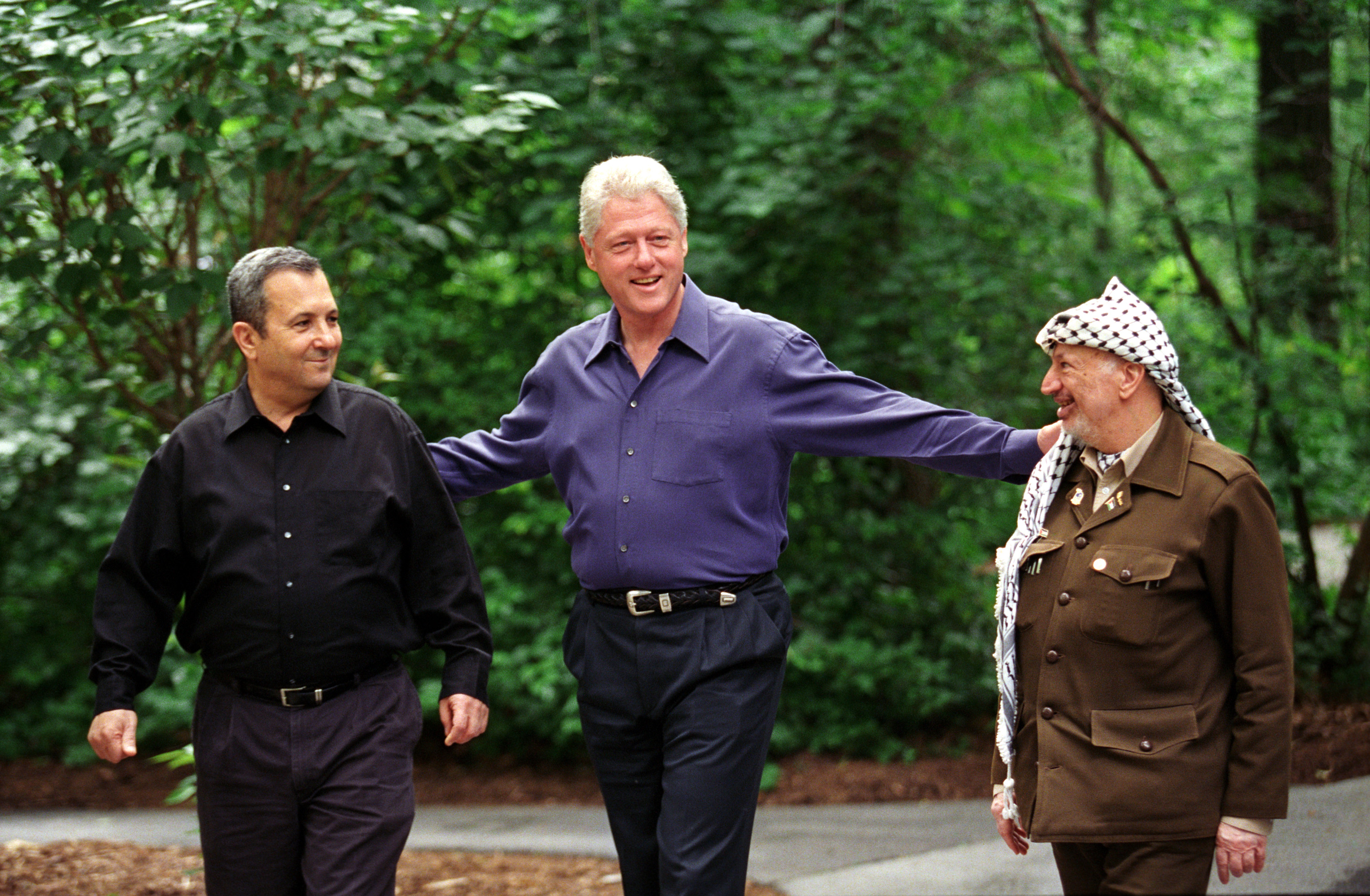
Ehud Barak, Bill Clinton, and Yasser Arafat during the 2000 Camp David Summit

==== July ====
- July 11–25 – The Camp David 2000 Summit is held which is aimed at reaching a "final status" agreement. The summit collapses after Yasser Arafat would not accept a proposal drafted by American and Israeli negotiators. Ehud Barak is prepared to offer the entire Gaza Strip, part of East Jerusalem as capital of a Palestinian Arab state, 73% of the West Bank (excluding eastern Jerusalem) raising to 90–94% after 10–25 years, and financial reparations for Palestinian Arab refugees for peace. Arafat turns down the offer without making a counter-offer.
- September 28 – Israeli opposition leader Ariel Sharon visits the Temple Mount, protected by a several-hundred-strong Israeli police force. Riots by Palestinian Arabs erupt, leading to a full-fledged armed uprising (called the Al-Aqsa Intifada by sympathizers and the Oslo War by opponents).

==== October ====
- October 12 – 2000 Ramallah lynching – A Palestinian Arab mob lynches two Israel Defense Forces reservists, Vadim Nurzhitz and Yossi Avrahami, who had accidentally entered the Palestinian Authority-controlled city of Ramallah in the West Bank. The brutality of the event, captured in a photo of one of the perpetrators proudly waving his blood-stained hands to the crowd below, sparks international outrage and further intensifies the ongoing conflict between Israel and Palestinian Arabs.

Notable Palestinian militant operations against Israeli targets

The most prominent Palestinian militant acts and operations committed against Israeli targets during 2000 include:

- November 2 – 2 Israelis are killed and 10 are wounded when a car bomb explodes near the Mahane Yehuda Market in Jerusalem, one of whom is the daughter of the MK and former housing minister Yitzhak Levy. Islamic Jihad claims responsibility for the attack.
- November 20 – Kfar Darom bombing: an Israeli school bus was struck by a roadside bomb at the Jewish settlement of Kfar Darom killing 2 adults and injuring several others. Hamas claimed responsibility.
- November 22 – Hadera's main street bombing: Two Israeli women are killed and 60 civilians are wounded in a car bomb attack in Hadera. Hamas claimed responsibility.
- December 22 – Mechola bombing: Palestinian suicide bomber injures 3 Israeli soldiers. Hamas claimed responsibility.

Notable Israeli military operations against Palestinian militancy targets
The most prominent Israeli military counter-terrorism operations (military campaigns and military operations) carried out against Palestinian militants during 2000 include:

- September 30 – Second Intifada: Muhammad al-Durrah incident – Ten Palestinian Arabs are killed during crossfire between Israeli forces and Palestinian Arab militia at the Netzarim junction, among them the twelve-year-old boy Muhammad al-Durrah who is caught in the crossfire and is allegedly killed in the arms of his father. Al-Durrah's death was filmed by a Palestinian Arab freelance cameraman and made worldwide headlines and as a result Al-Durrah became a symbol of the Palestinian Arab uprising in 2000 and of Palestinian martyrdom. Whether the Israeli forces or the Palestinian Arab militia shot the boy is a matter of dispute.
- December 17 – Tanzim activist Samih al-Malabi, is assassinated by a mobile phone bomb near the Qalandiyya refugee camp.

== Notable deaths ==
- February 23 – Ofra Haza (born 1957), Israeli singer.
- August 12 – Eliahu Ben Elissar (born 1932), Polish-born Israeli diplomat and politician.
- September 22 – Yehuda Amichai (born 1924), German-born Israeli poet and an Israeli.
- November 12 – Leah Rabin (born 1928), German-born wife of former Prime minister of Israel Yitzhak Rabin.
- December 31 – Rabbi Binyamin Ze'ev Kahane (born 1966), American-born Israeli settler leader.

== See also ==
- 2000 in Israeli film
- 2000 in Israeli television
- 2000 in Israeli music
- 2000 in Israeli sport
- Israel in the Eurovision Song Contest 2000
- Israel at the 2000 Summer Olympics
