= 1999 in Israel =

- Decades: 1970s; 1980s; 1990s; 2000s; 2010s
- See also: History of Israel; Timeline of Israeli history; List of years in Israel

Events in the year 1999 in Israel.

== Incumbents ==
- President of Israel – Ezer Weizman
- Prime Minister of Israel – Benjamin Netanyahu (Likud) until 6 July, Ehud Barak (Israeli Labor Party)
- President of the Supreme Court – Aharon Barak
- Chief of General Staff – Shaul Mofaz
- Government of Israel – 27th Government of Israel until 6 July, 28th Government of Israel

== Events ==
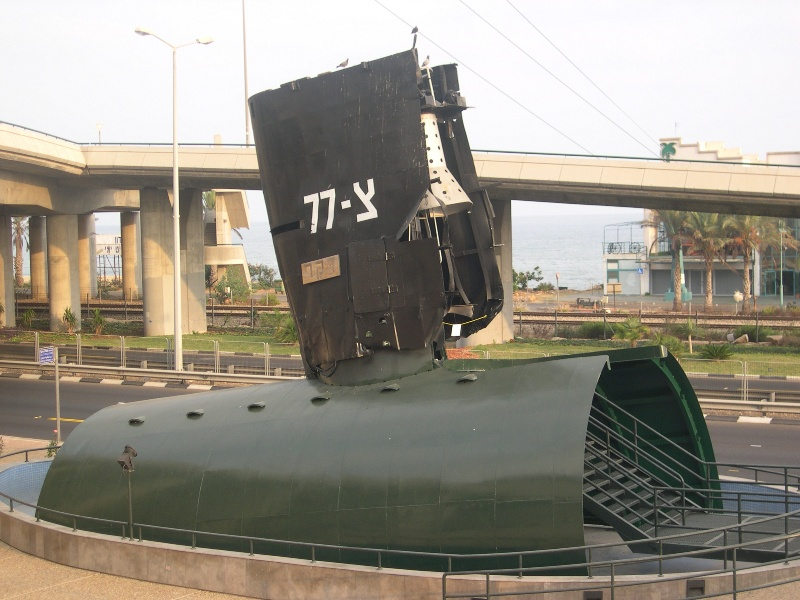
The recovered conning tower of the INS Dakar at the Naval Museum of Haifa

- 14 February – over 250,000 Orthodox Jews demonstrate in Jerusalem over a Supreme Court ruling that Reform and Conservative congregations should have representatives on local religious councils.
- 9 March – Rana Arslan becomes the first Israeli Arab to win the Miss Israel pageant.
- 17 March – Aryeh Deri is convicted of taking bribes while serving as Interior Minister of Israel and is sentenced to four years in prison and receives a fine of 250,000 NIS.
- 17 May – Ehud Barak is elected prime minister of Israel.
- 28 May – A joint U.S.–Israeli search team finds the wreck of the long-lost Israeli submarine INS Dakar in the Mediterranean Sea.
- 29 May – Eden represents Israel at the Eurovision Song Contest, with the song “Yom Huledet” ("Happy Birthday"), held at the Binyanei HaUma in Jerusalem, following Israel’s win the previous year, achieving fifth place.
- 6 July – Prime Minister Ehud Barak presents his cabinet for a Knesset "Vote of Confidence". The 28th Government is approved that day and the members were sworn in.
- 22 August – Tal committee: The prime minister and defense minister Ehud Barak appoint an Israeli public committee, headed by the retired judge Tzvi Tal, to deal with the special exemption from mandatory military service in the Israel Defense Forces given to Israeli Ultra Orthodox Jews.

=== Israeli–Palestinian conflict ===
The most prominent events related to the Israeli–Palestinian conflict which occurred during 1999 include:

Notable Palestinian militant operations against Israeli targets

The most prominent Palestinian militant acts and operations committed against Israeli targets during 1999 include:

- 9 September – Egged Bus 960 bombing and Haifa Central Bus Station bombing

Notable Israeli military operations against Palestinian militancy targets
The most prominent Israeli military counter-terrorism operations (military campaigns and military operations) carried out against Palestinian militants during 1999 include:

== Notable deaths ==
- 28 February – Erez Gerstein (b. 1960), commander of the Golani Brigade and Lebanon Liaison Unit, killed from a roadside bomb in Lebanon.
- 27 March – Nahum Stelmach (b. 1936), Israeli footballer and manager.
- 20 April – Bethsabée de Rothschild (b. 1914), British-born Israeli-French philanthropist.
- 18 July – Meir Ariel (b. 1942), Israeli singer.
- 18 August – Hanoch Levin (b. 1943), Israeli playwright, theater director, poet and writer.
- 1 October – Ted Arison (b. 1924), Israeli-American businessman.
- 15 October – Yosef Burg (b. 1909), German-born Israeli politician and Rabbi.
- Full date unknown
  - Shmuel Horowitz (b. 1901), Russian (Belarus)-born Israeli agronomist.
  - Shlomo Morag, (b. 1926), Israeli professor of the Hebrew Language at the Hebrew University of Jerusalem.
  - Zahara Schatz (b. 1916), Israeli painter and sculptor.

== See also ==
- 1999 in Israeli film
- Israel in the Eurovision Song Contest 1999
