= Sweden in the Eurovision Song Contest 1999 =

- Eurovision Song Contest 1999
- Participating broadcaster: Sveriges Television (SVT)
- Country: Sweden
- Selection process: Melodifestivalen 1999
- Selection date: 27 February 1999

Competing entry
- Song: "Take Me to Your Heaven"
- Artist: Charlotte Nilsson
- Songwriters: Lars Diedricson; Gert Lengstrand; Marcos Ubeda

Placement
- Final result: 1st, 163 points

Participation chronology

Sweden was represented at the Eurovision Song Contest 1999 with the song "Take Me to Your Heaven", composed by Lars Diedricson, with lyrics by Gert Lengstrand and Marcos Ubeda, and performed by Charlotte Nilsson. The Swedish participating broadcaster, Sveriges Television (SVT), selected its entry through Melodifestivalen 1999. The entry eventually won the Eurovision Song Contest, becoming the fourth ever victory for Sweden in the contest.

== Before Eurovision ==
=== Melodifestivalen 1999 ===
Melodifestivalen 1999 was the selection for the 39th song to represent Sweden at the Eurovision Song Contest. It was the 38th time that this system of picking a song had been used. 1,315 songs were submitted to Sveriges Television (SVT) for the competition, with ten songs selected to compete. The final was held in the Victoriahallen in Stockholm on 27 February 1999, presented by Anders Lundin and Vendela Kirsebom Thommesen, and was broadcast on SVT2 and Sveriges Radio's P4 network. The winner was chosen through a 50/50 jury/televoting method, which was Charlotte Nilsson with the song "Tusen och en natt", written by Gert Lengstrand and Lars Diedricsson. It got the highest number of points from both the 11 juries and the televoters. A total of 630,339 votes were cast.

==== Competing entries ====
Artist	Song	Songwriter(s)
Ai	"Bilder av dig"	Stephan Berg
Arvingarna	"Det svär jag på"	Torgny Söderberg, Lena Philipsson
Cleo	"Natten är min vän"	Thomas G:son
Charlotte Nilsson	"Tusen och en natt"	Gert Lengstrand, Lars "Dille" Diedricson
Christer Björkman	"Välkommen hem"	Lasse Sahlin, Jan Lundkvist
Crosstalk	"Det gäller dig och mig"	Lars Edvall, Mattias Reimer
Drömhus	"Stjärna på himmelen"	Per Andréassen, Anders Dannvik
Janica	"Jag kan se dig"	Anders Dannvik, Pär Olsson
Martin	"(Du är så) Yeah Yeah Wow Wow"	Martin Svensson
Roger Pontare	"Som av is"	Lasse Johansson, Staffan Stavert

==== Final ====
R/O	Artist	Song	Jury	Televote		Total	Place
R/O	Artist	Song	Jury	Votes	Points	Total	Place
1	Charlotte Nilsson	"Tusen och en natt"	85	124,947	132	217	1
2	Crosstalk	"Det gäller dig och mig"	65	73,600	22	87	6
3	Janica	"Jag kan se dig"	66	22,106	0	66	7
4	Drömhus	"Stjärna på himmelen"	38	86,999	110	148	2
5	Roger Pontare	"Som av is"	54	73,744	44	98	5
6	Martin	"(Du är så) Yeah Yeah Wow Wow"	43	75,354	66	109	4
7	Christer Björkman	"Välkommen hem"	6	16,523	0	6	10
8	Ai	"Bilder av dig"	31	56,890	11	42	9
9	Arvingarna	"Det svär jag på"	26	75,654	88	114	3
10	Cleo	"Natten är min vän"	59	24,522	0	59	8

Detailed Regional Jury Voting
R/O	Song	Luleå	Umeå	Sundsvall	Falun	Karlstad	Örebro	Norrköping	Gothenburg	Växjö	Malmö	Stockholm	Total
1	"Tusen och en natt"	10	12	8	8	4	8	10	1	10	10	4	85
2	"Det gäller dig och mig"	12	4	1	12	6	6	2	10	2		10	65
3	"Jag kan se dig"		8	10	6	8	4	12	2	6	4	6	66
4	"Stjärna på himmelen"	8	2		10	1			12	1	2	2	38
5	"Som av is"	2	6	6		12		4		12	12		54
6	"(Du är så) Yeah Yeah Wow Wow"	6		2		2	2	1	8	4	6	12	43
7	"Välkommen hem"		1		4						1		6
8	"Bilder av dig"	4			1		12		6			8	31
9	"Det svär jag på"	1		4	2		1	6	4		8		26
10	"Natten är min vän"		10	12		10	10	8		8		1	59
Spokespersons
Luleå – Christer Holmqvist; Umeå – Anita Färingö; Sundsvall – Peter Nässén; Falun – Tinna Edlund; Karlstad – Jenny Eklund; Örebro – Päivi Kotka; Norrköping – Per Dahlberg; Gothenburg – Henrik Johnsson; Växjö – Henrik Olsson; Malmö – Pernilla Månsson; Stockholm – Sten Söderberg

== At Eurovision ==
The song was translated into English for Eurovision as "Take Me To Your Heaven". Nilsson performed 15th on the night of the contest. At the end of the voting Sweden received 163 points, taking their fourth victory.

=== Voting ===
Points awarded to Sweden
Score	Country
12 points	Bosnia and Herzegovina; Estonia; Malta; Norway; United Kingdom
10 points	Denmark; Iceland; Portugal
8 points	Israel; Netherlands
7 points	Belgium; Slovenia
6 points	Austria; Cyprus; Poland; Spain; Turkey
5 points	Ireland
4 points	
3 points	France; Lithuania
2 points	Germany
1 point	

Points awarded by Sweden
Score	Country
12 points	Iceland
10 points	Estonia
8 points	Denmark
7 points	Austria
6 points	Bosnia and Herzegovina
5 points	Norway
4 points	Netherlands
3 points	Israel
2 points	Germany
1 point	Croatia
