= Denmark in the Eurovision Song Contest 1999 =

- Eurovision Song Contest 1999
- Participating broadcaster: Danmarks Radio (DR)
- Country: Denmark
- Selection process: Dansk Melodi Grand Prix 1999
- Selection date: 13 March 1999

Competing entry
- Song: "This Time I Mean It"
- Artist: Trine Jepsen and Michael Teschl
- Songwriter: Ebbe Ravn

Placement
- Final result: 8th, 71 points

Participation chronology

Denmark was represented at the Eurovision Song Contest 1999 with the song "This Time I Mean It", written by Ebbe Ravn, and performed by Trine Jepsen and Michael Teschl. The Danish participating broadcaster, DR, organised Dansk Melodi Grand Prix 1999 in order to select its entry for the contest. The broadcaster returned to the contest after a one-year absence following their relegation from 1998 as one of the six entrants with the least total average points over the preceding five contests.

Five songs competed the national final where "Denne gang" performed by the Trine Jepsen and Michael Teschl was the winner as decided upon through jury and public voting. The song was later translated from Danish to English for Eurovision and was titled "This Time I Mean It".

Denmark competed in the Eurovision Song Contest which took place on 29 May 1999. Performing during the show in position 9, Denmark placed eighth out of the 23 participating countries, scoring 71 points.

== Background ==
Prior to the 1999 contest, DR had participated in the Eurovision Song Contest representing Denmark twenty-eight times since its first entry in 1957. It had won the contest, to this point, on one occasion: in 1963 with the song "Dansevise" performed by Grethe and Jørgen Ingmann.

As part of its duties as participating broadcaster, DR organises the selection of its entry in the Eurovision Song Contest and broadcasts the event in the country. The broadcaster organised Dansk Melodi Grand Prix 1999 in order to select its entry for the 1999 contest; DR has selected all of its Eurovision entries through Dansk Melodi Grand Prix.

== Before Eurovision ==
=== Dansk Melodi Grand Prix 1999 ===
Dansk Melodi Grand Prix 1999 was the 30th edition of Dansk Melodi Grand Prix, the music competition organised by DR to select its entries for the Eurovision Song Contest. The event was held on 13 March 1999 during the DR1 programme Musikbutikken, which took place at the DR Studio 3 in Copenhagen and hosted by Keld Heick. The national final was watched by 1.384 million viewers in Denmark, making it the most popular show of the week in the country.

==== Competing entries ====
A selection committee selected five composers that were invited by DR to submit their entries. All songs were required to be performed in Danish, while the artists of the submitted entries were chosen by DR in consultation with their composers.

Artist	Song	Songwriter(s)
Clark Best	"Kys mig i nat"	Thomas Negrijn
Jacob Haugaard	"3 x euro"	Michael Hardinger, Rasmus Schwenger
Stine Findsen	"Flammer under vand"	Søren Bundgaard
Susanne Marcussen	"To hjerter"	Susanne Marcussen, Tamra Rosanes
Trine Jepsen and Michael Teschl	"Denne gang"	Ebbe Ravn

==== Final ====
The final took place on 13 March 1999. The winner, "Denne gang" performed by Trine Jepsen and Michael Teschl, was selected based on the combination of votes from a public televote (4/5) and the votes of a six-member jury (1/5). The jury voting results along with the voting results of each of Denmark's four regions were converted to points which were each distributed as follows: 4, 6, 8, 10 and 12 points. The six-member jury panel was composed of six singers: Johnny Reimar, Anne-Cathrine Herdorf (who represented Denmark in 1987), Ann-Louise, Anders Frandsen, Alex Nyborg Madsen, and Carola Häggkvist (who won Eurovision for Sweden in 1991). In addition to the performances of the competing entries, Brotherhood of Man (who won Eurovision for the United Kingdom in 1976) performed as the interval act.

Final – 13 March 1999
R/O	Artist	Song	Jury	Public	Total	Place
1	Stine Findsen	"Flammer under vand"	10	32	42	3
2	Clark Best	"Kys mig i nat"	8	22	30	4
3	Jacob Haugaard	"3 x euro"	4	40	44	2
4	Trine Jepsen and Michael Teschl	"Denne gang"	12	48	60	1
5	Susanne Marcussen	"To hjerter"	6	18	24	5

Detailed Regional Televoting Results
Song	Televoting Regions				Total
Song	Jutland	Funen	Zealand and Islands	Capital Region	Total
"Flammer under vand"	8	8	8	8	32
"Kys mig i nat"	6	6	6	4	22
"3 x euro"	10	10	10	10	40
"Denne gang"	12	12	12	12	48
"To hjerter"	4	4	4	6	18

== At Eurovision ==
According to Eurovision rules, all nations with the exceptions of the eight countries that averaged the least points over the preceding five contests until the 1998 contest competed in the final on 29 May 1999. On 17 November 1998, a special allocation draw was held which determined the running order and Denmark was set to perform in position 9, following the entry from Norway and before the entry from France. Denmark finished in eighth place with 71 points.

The show was broadcast on DR1 with commentary by Keld Heick. The contest was watched by a total of 1 million viewers in Denmark.

=== Voting ===
Below is a breakdown of points awarded to Denmark and awarded by Denmark in the contest. The nation awarded its 12 points to Iceland in the contest.

DR appointed Kirsten Siggaard, who represented Denmark in 1984, in 1985, and in 1988 as part of duo Hot Eyes, as its spokesperson to announce the Danish votes during the show.

Points awarded to Denmark
Score	Country
12 points	Iceland
10 points	
8 points	Cyprus; Sweden
7 points	Ireland
6 points	Estonia
5 points	Austria; Slovenia; Spain; United Kingdom
4 points	Malta
3 points	Portugal
2 points	Israel
1 point	Poland

Points awarded by Denmark
Score	Country
12 points	Iceland
10 points	Sweden
8 points	Bosnia and Herzegovina
7 points	Netherlands
6 points	Norway
5 points	Germany
4 points	Estonia
3 points	Austria
2 points	Israel
1 point	United Kingdom
