= Chris and Moira =

Maltese musical duo

Chris & Moira were a Maltese musical duo, formed by Moira Stafrace and Christopher Scicluna. They were best known for representing Malta in the Eurovision Song Contest 1994.

== Life and career ==
Stafrace was born in Malta in 1970. At the age of 12 she started her singing career. She bought a guitar and she started to sing with many bands. She took part in numerous festivals where she won many awards. In 1992 she was given the award for Best Personality in the music industry of her country. In 1993 she met and fell in love with a guitarist, Chris Scicluna.

Scicluna was born in Malta on 8 July 1959 and started music studies at the age of 8 and spent most of the 1980s freelancing in the United Kingdom. He recorded his first album in 1979, 'Starlights' as a singer composer with a band. In 1990 'Ever Changing Moods' was released by a band called Getting Closer. One of the songs from Getting Closer's second album 'This Time' was chosen to represent Malta in the 1993 Eurovision with William Mangion. In this event Chris met Moira and in 1994 composed the music for the song More than Love, which represented their country at the contest in Dublin. They ranked 5th with 97 points – one of the best results for Malta.

In 1999, the duo returned to Eurovision, this time writing a song entitled Believe 'n Peace for the girlband Times Three. The leading singer of the group was Moira's sister. Both Chris and Moira were on stage as backing vocalists.

Scicluna died on 18 February 2022, at the age of 62.

Stafrace participated in the Maltese national selection for Eurovision 2024 with her song "Feather Flight", however she did not progress past the semi finals.

== See also ==
- Malta in the Eurovision Song Contest

Awards and achievements
| Preceded by William Mangion with "This Time" | Malta in the Eurovision Song Contest; 1994 | Succeeded by Mike Spiteri with "Keep Me in Mind" |
