= Austria in the Eurovision Song Contest 1999 =

- Eurovision Song Contest 1999
- Participating broadcaster: Österreichischer Rundfunk (ORF)
- Country: Austria
- Selection process: Internal selection
- Announcement date: Artist: 12 February 1999; Song: 25 February 1999

Competing entry
- Song: "Reflection"
- Artist: Bobbie Singer
- Songwriter: Dave Moskin

Placement
- Final result: 10th, 65 points

Participation chronology

Austria was represented at the Eurovision Song Contest 1999 with the song "Reflection", written by Dave Moskin, and performed by Bobbie Singer. The Austrian participating broadcaster Österreichischer Rundfunk (ORF), internally selected its entry for the contest. The broadcaster returned to the contest after a one-year absence following its relegation from 1998 as one of the six entrants with the least total average points over the preceding five contests. On 12 February 1999, ORF announced that it had internally selected Bobbie Singer, while "Reflection" was presented to the public on 25 February 1999 during the ORF programme Vera.

Austria competed in the Eurovision Song Contest which took place on 29 May 1999. Performing during the show in position 18, Austria placed tenth out of the 23 participating countries, scoring 65 points.

== Background ==
Prior to the 1999 contest, Österreichischer Rundfunk (ORF) has participated in the Eurovision Song Contest representing Austria thirty-six times since its first entry in 1957. It has won the contest on one occasion: in 1966 with the song "Merci, Chérie" performed by Udo Jürgens. Its least successful result has been last place, achieved on seven occasions, most recently in 1991. It has also received nul points on three occasions; in 1962, in 1988, and in 1991.

As part of its duties as participating broadcaster, ORF organises the selection of its entry in the Eurovision Song Contest and broadcasts the event in the country. The broadcaster confirmed its intentions to participate in Autumn 1998. Since 1995, ORF has held an internal selection to choose its artist and song, a method which was continued to select its entry for the 1999 contest.

== Before Eurovision ==
=== Internal selection ===
ORF announced "Reflection in Your Eyes" performed by Bobbie Singer as its entry for the Eurovision Song Contest 1999 during a press conference that took place on 12 February 1999 at the Ö3-Haus in Vienna. Bobbie Singer and the song, written by Dave Moskin, was selected by a panel of ORF entertainment editors as well as representatives of record companies and the radio channel Ö3, which included Head of Ö3 Bogdan Roscic and ORF entertainment director Dieter Böttger, from over 200 submissions by record companies. Among the artists that also submitted their songs to the broadcaster included singers Jade Davies and Maggey E.C., the duos Bluatschink and Two in One, and the bands c-bra, Free & Single and Young. In regards to her selection as the Austrian entrant, Singer stated: "The fact that I was selected is total madness. I'm not expecting much, but I'm hoping for a win." The official presentation of the song, which was later retitled as "Reflection", took place on 25 February 1999 during the ORF programme Vera, hosted by Dieter Chmelar.

=== Promotion ===
Bobbie Singer embarked on a promotional tour in the lead up the Eurovision Song Contest, performing at the Merkur City Mall in Vienna on 25 March and appearing on ORF programme Confetti Town on 24 April 1999. "Reflection" was released as a CD single on 1 March 1999, which featured additional mixes of the song.

== At Eurovision ==
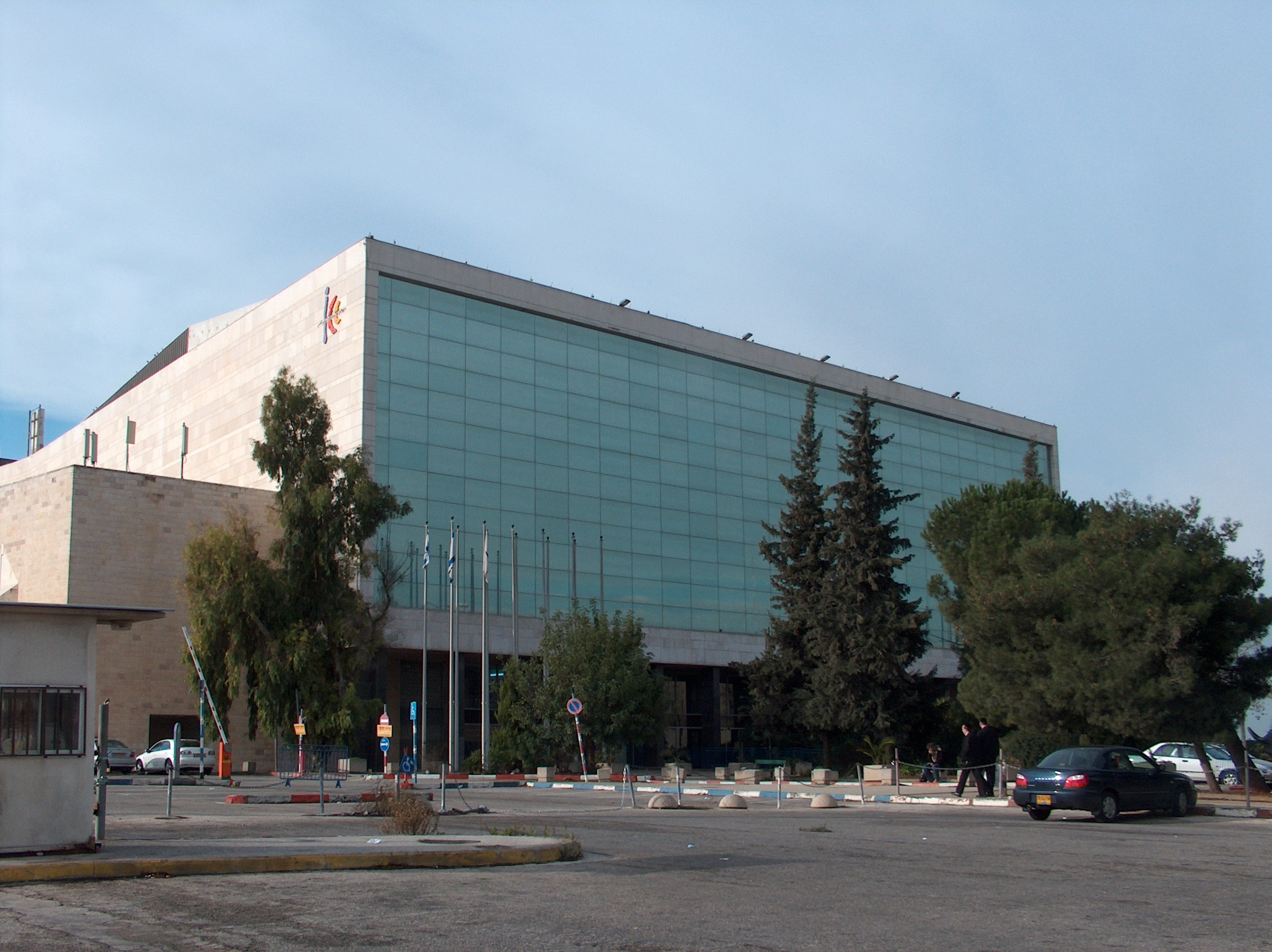
The Eurovision Song Contest 1999 took place at the International Convention Center in Jerusalem, on 29 May 1999.

The Eurovision Song Contest 1999 took place at the International Convention Center in Jerusalem, on 29 May 1999. According to the Eurovision rules, the 23-country participant list for the contest was composed of: the previous year's winning country and host nation, the seventeen countries which had obtained the highest average points total over the preceding five contests, and any eligible countries which did not compete in the 1998 contest. Austria was one of the eligible countries which did not compete in the 1998 contest, and thus were permitted to participate. The running order for the contest was decided by a draw held on 17 November 1998; Austria was assigned to perform 18th at the 1999 contest, following Ireland's "When You Need Me" performed by The Mullans and preceding Israel's "Happy Birthday" by Eden. Eurovision Song Contest 1999 was televised in Austria on ORF 1 with the commentary by Andi Knoll and on FM4 with the commentary by Stermann & Grissemann.

Prior to the contest, Austria was considered by bookmakers to be the tenth most likely country to win the competition, however, on the day of the contest, the British company Ladbrokes had shown Austria rising to a predicted seventh place. Bobbie Singer took part in technical rehearsals at the venue on 25 and 27 May, followed by dress rehearsals on 28 and 29 May. The Austrian performance featured Bobbie Singer on stage in red blouse and black jeans performing with two guitarists, drummer and two backing vocalists in a band set-up. After the voting concluded, Austria scored 65 points and placed 10th in a field of 23.

=== Voting ===
The same voting system in use since 1975 was again implemented for 1999 contest, with each country providing 1–8, 10 and 12 points to the ten highest-ranking songs as determined by a selected jury or the viewing public through televoting, with countries not allowed to vote for themselves. Austria opted to use televoting to determine which countries would receive their points. ORF appointed Dodo Roscic as its spokesperson to announce the Austrian points during the show. Below is a breakdown of points awarded to Austria and awarded by Austria in the grand final of the contest.

Points awarded to Austria
Score	Country
12 points	
10 points	
8 points	Estonia; Iceland
7 points	Sweden; United Kingdom
6 points	Belgium; Norway
5 points	Germany; Portugal
4 points	Slovenia
3 points	Denmark; Poland
2 points	Netherlands
1 point	Cyprus

Points awarded by Austria
Score	Country
12 points	Bosnia and Herzegovina
10 points	Germany
8 points	Croatia
7 points	Malta
6 points	Sweden
5 points	Denmark
4 points	Netherlands
3 points	Estonia
2 points	Iceland
1 point	Israel
