= Iceland in the Eurovision Song Contest 1999 =

- Eurovision Song Contest 1999
- Participating broadcaster: Ríkisútvarpið (RÚV)
- Country: Iceland
- Selection process: Internal selection
- Announcement date: Artist: 11 January 1999; Song: 9 April 1999

Competing entry
- Song: "All Out of Luck"
- Artist: Selma
- Songwriters: Selma Björnsdóttir; Sveinbjörn I. Baldvinsson; Þorvaldur Bjarni Þorvaldsson

Placement
- Final result: 2nd, 146 points

Participation chronology

Iceland was represented at the Eurovision Song Contest 1999 with the song "All Out of Luck", written by Selma Björnsdóttir, Sveinbjörn I. Baldvinsson, and Þorvaldur Bjarni Þorvaldsson, and performed by Selma herself. The Icelandic participating broadcaster, Ríkisútvarpið (RÚV), internally selected its entry for the contest in January 1999. The song, "All Out of Luck", was presented to the public on 9 April 1999 during the television programme Stutt í spunann.

Iceland competed in the Eurovision Song Contest which took place on 29 May 1999. Performing during the show in position 13, Iceland placed second out of the 23 participating countries, scoring 146 points. This is Iceland's best result in the contest to date.

== Background ==
Prior to the 1999 contest, Ríkisútvarpið (RÚV) had participated in the Eurovision Song Contest representing Iceland twelve times since its first entry in 1986. Its best placing in the contest to this point was fourth, achieved in 1990 with the song "Eitt lag enn" performed by Stjórnin. In 1997, it placed twentieth with the song "Minn hinsti dans" performed by Paul Oscar.

As part of its duties as participating broadcaster, RÚV organises the selection of its entry in the Eurovision Song Contest and broadcasts the event in the country. Since 1995, the broadcaster opted to internally select its entry for the contest, a method that continued for its 1999 participation.

== Before Eurovision ==
=== Internal selection ===
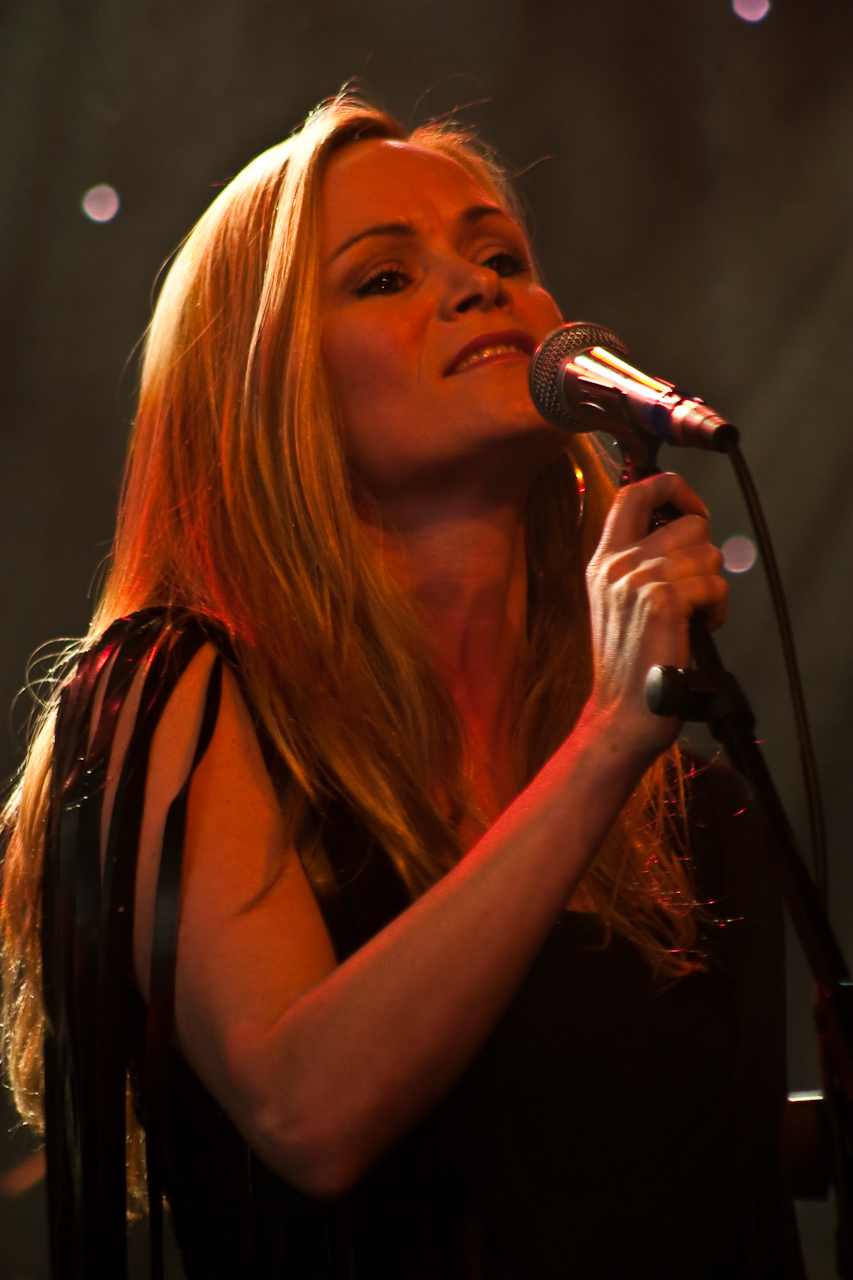
Selma was internally selected to represent Iceland in 1999

RÚV internally selected its entry for the Eurovision Song Contest 1999. On 11 January 1999, Selma Björnsdóttir was announced as the Icelandic representative. It was also announced that her song would be written in cooperation with Þorvaldur Bjarni Þorvaldsson. Þorvaldsson composed several entries, which were submitted to Selma who selected "All Out of Luck" as the song she would perform. Lyrics of the song were written by Sveinbjörn I. Baldvinsson and Selma herself, and was presented to the public along with the release of the official music video, directed by Óskar Jónasson, on 9 April 1999 during the television programme Stutt í spunann, hosted by Eva María Jónsdóttir and Hjálmar Hjálmarsson.

"All Out of Luck" was the first Icelandic Eurovision entry to be performed in English and also the first Icelandic entry to be in another language than Icelandic. Selma explained that the decision not to sing in Icelandic, which was met with criticism from the public, was made "to ensure that those who come from nations who speak less well known languages have the same chance as those who speak English".

== At Eurovision ==
The Eurovision Song Contest 1999 took place at the International Convention Center in Jerusalem, Israel, on 29 May 1999. According to the Eurovision rules, the 23-country participant list for the contest was composed of: the previous year's winning country and host nation, the seventeen countries which had obtained the highest average points total over the preceding five contests, and any eligible countries which did not compete in the 1998 contest. Iceland was one of the eligible countries which did not compete in the 1998 contest, and thus were permitted to participate. On 17 November 1998, an allocation draw was held which determined the running order and Iceland was set to perform in position 13, following the entry from Poland and before the entry from Cyprus. Iceland finished in second place with 146 points.

The contest was broadcast in Iceland on RÚV with commentary by Gísli Marteinn Baldursson.

=== Voting ===
Below is a breakdown of points awarded to Iceland and awarded by Iceland in the contest. The nation awarded its 12 points to Denmark in the contest.

RÚV appointed Áslaug Dóra Eyjólfsdóttir as its spokesperson to announce the results of the Icelandic televote during the show.

Points awarded to Iceland
| Score | Country |
|---|---|
| 12 points | Cyprus; Denmark; Sweden |
| 10 points | Estonia; Israel; Malta; Norway; Spain; Turkey; United Kingdom |
| 8 points | Belgium; Lithuania |
| 7 points | Netherlands |
| 6 points | |
| 5 points | |
| 4 points | Ireland; Poland; Portugal |
| 3 points | Germany |
| 2 points | Austria |
| 1 point | |

Points awarded by Iceland
| Score | Country |
|---|---|
| 12 points | Denmark |
| 10 points | Sweden |
| 8 points | Austria |
| 7 points | Norway |
| 6 points | Netherlands |
| 5 points | Germany |
| 4 points | Croatia |
| 3 points | Bosnia and Herzegovina |
| 2 points | Estonia |
| 1 point | Israel |
