= PingPong (band) =

Israeli pop band

PingPong פינג פונג
- Origin: Be'er Sheva and Tel Aviv, Israel
- Genres: Pop music, Techno
- Years active: 1999-2000
- Label: Hed Arzi Music
- Members: Roy Arad; Guy Assif; Ahal Eden; Yifat Giladi

PingPong (Hebrew: פינג פונג) is an Israeli pop quartet that represented Israel in Eurovision Song Contest 2000 with the song "Sameach" (Hebrew: שמח, lit. Happy).

The members of the band were: Guy Assif, Ahal Eden, Roy Arad and Yifat Giladi. The band released one album Between Moral and Fashion (2000, Hed Arzi) with songs like "Burger Ranch" (Israeli chain of fastfood restaurants), "I got a lover in Givati" and "Mr. Israel".

Their song "Sameach" (Hebrew for "Happy") was admitted to the Eurovision Song Contest 2000. At the close of voting the song had received 7 points, placing 22nd in a field of 24. The song lyrics mentioned a friend from Damascus who dates an Israeli girl. The band was sanctioned by the Israel Broadcasting Authority after waving the flag of Syria during the rehearsal and the video-clip of the song. They refused to back down for the performance in the final and pulled the flag out live, Ehud Barak was negotiating at the time. They also visited a Syrian community center in Stockholm, where the Eurovision was held. The song was covered by the band Beer7, a punk band whose vocalist is Roy's younger sister.

The band was the favourite of the NME magazine for winning the contest, but failed.

In 2006, a documentary called 'Sipur Sameach" made by filmmaker Alon Weinstock was released on DVD, following the group's trip to Sweden.

Awards and achievements
Preceded by Eden with Happy Birthday	Israel in the Eurovision Song Contest; 2000	Succeeded by Tal Sondak with En Davar
