= United Kingdom in the Eurovision Song Contest 1999 =

- Eurovision Song Contest 1999
- Participating broadcaster: British Broadcasting Corporation (BBC)
- Country: United Kingdom
- Selection process: The Great British Song Contest 1999
- Selection date: 7 March 1999

Competing entry
- Song: "Say It Again"
- Artist: Precious
- Songwriter: Paul Varney

Placement
- Final result: 12th, 38 points

Participation chronology

The United Kingdom was represented at the Eurovision Song Contest 1999 with the song "Say It Again", written by Paul Varney, and performed by the group Precious. The British participating broadcaster, the British Broadcasting Corporation (BBC), organised a public selection process to determine its entry for the contest, The Great British Song Contest 1999. Eight songs competed over two rounds, with four songs selected through a radio-broadcast semi-final to advance to the televised final round, held on 7 March 1999, where viewers selected the winning entry through televoting. "Say It Again" performed by girl group Precious received the most votes and was selected to represent the nation in the contest.

Precious performed fifth at the international contest, and at the close of the voting process the UK finished in 12th place, receiving 38 points from 10 countries. At the time this result was the UK's second-worst placing in its competitive history, and was the nation's first finish outside of the top 10 countries in 12 years. "Say It Again" charted in several singles charts in Europe following the contest, and following further limited commercial success as a group Precious subsequently disbanded in 2001.

== Background ==
Prior to the 1999 contest, the British Broadcasting Corporation (BBC) had participated in the Eurovision Song Contest representing the United Kingdom 41 times since its first entry in 1957 and had competed in all but two editions of the contest. Before this year's event, it had won the contest five times: in 1967 with the song "Puppet on a String" performed by Sandie Shaw, in 1969 with the song "Boom Bang-a-Bang" performed by Lulu, in 1976 with "Save Your Kisses for Me" performed by Brotherhood of Man, in 1981 with the song "Making Your Mind Up" performed by Bucks Fizz and in 1997 with the song "Love Shine a Light" performed by Katrina and the Waves. It had also finished in second place on fifteen occasions, more than any other country. At the previous year's contest, it finished in second place out of twenty-five competing entries with the song "Where Are You?" performed by Imaani amassing a total of 166 points.

Per the rules of the 1999 contest, as the UK featured among the 17 countries with the highest average scores over the past five editions, they were permitted to enter the upcoming contest, and the BBC were subsequently included on the European Broadcasting Union's (EBU) list of the 23 countries that had signed up to partake in the contest. The BBC opted to select its chosen entry for the contest through a national final, The Great British Song Contest 1999.

== Before Eurovision ==
=== The Great British Song Contest 1999 ===
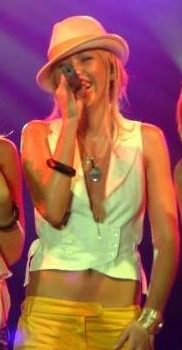
Precious group member Jenny Frost went on to become a member of Atomic Kitten.

The BBC organised a public selection process to determine its entry for the Eurovision Song Contest 1999. The Great British Song Contest was organised for the fourth time, and a similar format to that used for previous contests was implemented: following a public submission process, eight songs were selected to compete in a semi-final broadcast on BBC Radio 2, where listeners would choose four entries via televoting to progress to a televised final on BBC One, where a second round of public voting would determine the winning song that would represent the UK at Eurovision. More than 840 songs were submitted to the competition; a 40-song shortlist of these entries was presented to a panel of music professionals representing the British Academy of Songwriters, Composers and Authors, which reduced the number of potential entries to 20, and BBC contest organisers then selected the eight semi-finalists from this shortlist on 21 January 1999.

==== Semi-final ====
The eight semi-finalists were featured on the Radio 2 shows Wake Up to Wogan and The Ken Bruce Show between 1 and 4 February 1999, with two songs being played each day on both programmes. The semi-final was then held on 5 February, hosted by Terry Wogan and Ken Bruce. Once all songs had been played, listeners were invited to vote for their favourites through televoting. More than 21,000 votes were cast during the one-hour voting window, and the result was announced at the end of the programme, with the qualifying songs being announced in alphabetical order by title.

Contestants and results of the semi-final – 5 February 1999
R/O	Artist	Song	Songwriter(s)	Result
1	Alberta	"So Strange"	Paul Brown; Mike Connaris	Qualified
2	Cheryl Beattie	"Fly"	Cheryl Beattie; Kit Hain	—N/a
3	Energia feat. Ann McCabe	"All Time High"	Marc Andrewes	—N/a
4	Jay	"You've Taken My Dreams"	John Miles Junior; Bob Marshall	Qualified
5	Leanne Cartwright	"Wait Until the Morning"	Scott English; Debbie French; Matteo Saggese	—N/a
6	Precious	"Say It Again"	Paul Varney	Qualified
7	Sister Sway	"Until You Saved My Life"	Peter King; Lee Monteverde	Qualified
8	Susan Black	"Separate Lives"	Susan Black	—N/a

==== Final ====
A free promotional CD featuring extracts of the four finalists was released and made available in high street record shops. Ahead of the final each of the four participating acts performed their competing entries on Top of the Pops on BBC One, with one act appearing each week over four editions: Precious appeared on the 12 February 1999 edition; Sister Sway on 19 February 1999; Alberta on 26 February 1999; and Jay on 5 March 1999.

The final was held on 7 March 1999, hosted by Ulrika Jonsson and broadcast on BBC One. Jonsson provided live links between the pre-recorded performances, with short introductions by the songwriters of each song preceding a repeat airing of each act's performance from Top of the Pops. Other segments of the broadcast included clips from the 1998 contest in Birmingham, an interview with last year's Great British Song Contest winner Imaani, footage of the upcoming Eurovision host city Jerusalem and the contest venue, and a repeat during the end credits of ABBA's winning performance of "Waterloo" from the 1974 contest to mark 25 years since the Swedish group won the contest in Brighton. Televoting lines opened following the performance of the final act, with a one-hour voting window provided in which viewers were able to vote; the results were subsequently announced by Jonsson on 12 March 1999 during Top of the Pops on BBC Two, with the top three acts announced in reverse order along with the number of votes received. 3.14 million viewers watched the Great British Song Contest final on BBC One, and the Top of the Pops results show attracted an audience of 3.04 million.

Contestants and results of the final – 7 March 1999
R/O	Artist	Song	Televote	Place
1	Alberta	"So Strange"	51,708	2
2	Jay	"You've Taken My Dreams"	43,765	4
3	Precious	"Say It Again"	52,457	1
4	Sister Sway	"Until You Saved My Life"	51,398	3

=== Promotion ===
Ahead of the contest, Precious made several appearances on UK television programmes to promote their entry to the British public. The group made appearances on ITV's breakfast TV show GMTV, the BBC's children's TV show Fully Booked, took part in a live phone-in interview from Jerusalem on the BBC's Blue Peter, and made a further performance on Top of the Pops, broadcast on 28 May 1999, the day before the contest. A BBC documentary, Precious: A Band for Britain, was broadcast on BBC One on 24 May 1999 which followed the members of the group from their first performances to being selected to represent the UK at Eurovision. "Say It Again" was released as an enhanced CD single on 17 May 1999, which featured additional mixes and a music video of the song.

== At Eurovision ==
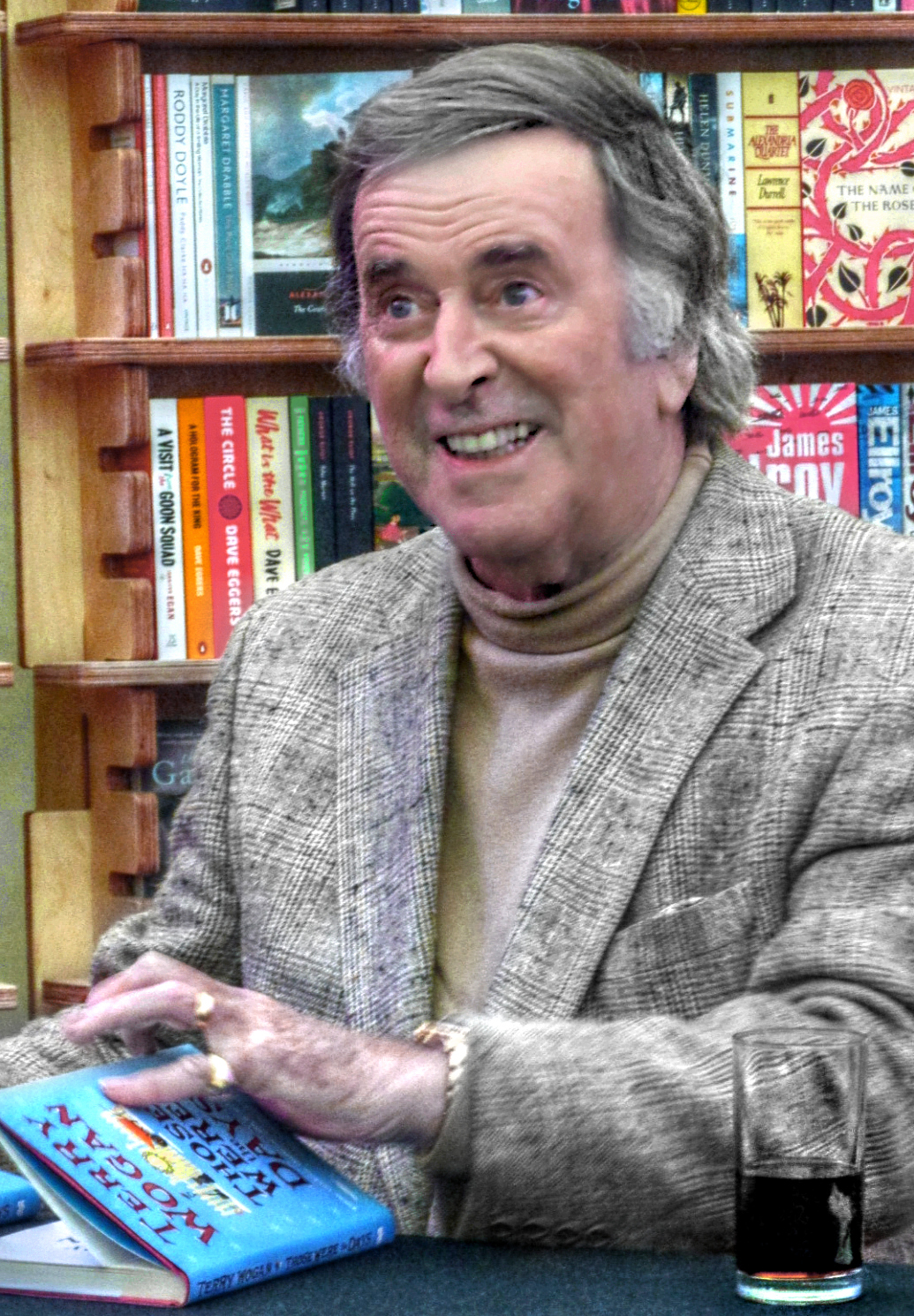
Terry Wogan was a co-host of the Great British Song Contest radio semi-final and provided television commentary at Eurovision.

The Eurovision Song Contest 1999 took place at the International Convention Center in Jerusalem, Israel, on 29 May 1999. According to the Eurovision rules, the 23-country participant list for the contest was composed of: the winning country from the previous year's contest; the 17 countries, other than the previous year's winner, which had obtained the highest average number of points over the last five contests; and any countries which had not participated in the previous year's content. The UK was one of the 17 countries with the highest average scores, and thus were permitted to participate. The running order for the contest was decided by a draw held on 17 November 1998; the UK was assigned position five, following Croatia and preceding Slovenia.

Precious took part in technical rehearsals at the venue on 24 and 26 May, followed by dress rehearsals on 28 and 29 May. Ahead of the contest the UK were considered one of the favourites to win among bookmakers, alongside the entries from Sweden, Iceland, and Cyprus. The contest was broadcast in the UK on television and radio, with Terry Wogan providing commentary for BBC One and Ken Bruce on BBC Radio 2. Wogan also made an appearance during the contest's opening segment, when the contest hosts Dafna Dekel, Yigal Ravid and Sigal Shachmon held a brief conversation with him on his experience as the host of the previous year's contest.

At the end of the contest, the UK placed equal 12th, with Belgium, receiving a total of 38 points. This marked the UK's second-poorest placing in the contest at that time, and was the UK's first finish outside of the top 10 countries since 1987. The contest was watched by a total of 8.91 million viewers in the UK.

=== Voting ===
The same voting system in use since 1975 was again implemented for this event, with each country providing 1–8, 10 and 12 points to the ten highest-ranking songs as determined by a selected jury or the viewing public through televoting, with countries not allowed to vote for themselves. This was the second contest to feature widespread public voting, and the UK opted to implement this method to determine which countries would receive their points, with an 8-member back-up jury assembled in case technical failures rendered the telephone votes invalid. Around 323,000 valid votes were registered in the UK in total during the five-minute voting window, which determined the UK's points. The BBC appointed Colin Berry as its spokesperson to announce the results of the British vote during the broadcast.

Points awarded to the United Kingdom
Score	Country
12 points	
10 points	
8 points	Malta
7 points	
6 points	
5 points	Croatia; Lithuania
4 points	Cyprus; Israel; Spain; Turkey
3 points	
2 points	Slovenia
1 point	Bosnia and Herzegovina; Denmark

Points awarded by the United Kingdom
Score	Country
12 points	Sweden
10 points	Iceland
8 points	Netherlands
7 points	Austria
6 points	Malta
5 points	Denmark
4 points	Ireland
3 points	Estonia
2 points	Cyprus
1 point	Germany

== After Eurovision ==
Following the contest, "Say It Again" reached a peak of number 6 on the UK Singles Chart and also featured in Sweden's Sverigetopplistan and Belgium's Ultratop. Precious continued to release new music, having some limited success in the singles chart and releasing a self-titled album in 2000. The group eventually disbanded in 2001: later that year Jenny Frost became a member of British girl group Atomic Kitten; Sophie McDonnell went on to host several television programmes, including the BBC's children's shows 50/50 and The Saturday Show; Louise Rose moved into acting, appearing in several roles in TV and film; Kalli Clark-Sternberg found work as a session singer; and Anya Lahiri returned to modelling and acting and subsequently became a fitness instructor.

Ahead of the 2000 contest a new rule was introduced which provided the UK with a permanent spot in the contest. As one of the highest-paying EBU member broadcasters, which provided the largest contributions to the Eurovision Song Contest, the UK, along with France, Spain and Germany, became one of the "Big Four" countries that would automatically qualify to each year's event, irrespective of the average number of points received in past contests.
