= Estonia in the Eurovision Song Contest 1999 =

- Eurovision Song Contest 1999
- Participating broadcaster: Eesti Televisioon (ETV)
- Country: Estonia
- Selection process: Eurolaul '99
- Selection date: 30 January 1999

Competing entry
- Song: "Diamond of Night"
- Artist: Evelin Samuel and Camille
- Songwriters: Priit Pajusaar; Glen Pilvre; Maian Kärmas; Kaari Sillamaa

Placement
- Final result: 6th, 90 points

Participation chronology

Estonia was represented at the Eurovision Song Contest 1999 with the song "Diamond of Night", composed by Priit Pajusaar and Glen Pilvre, with lyrics by Maian Kärmas and Kaari Sillamaa, and performed by Evelin Samuel and Camille. The Estonian participating broadcaster, Eesti Televisioon (ETV), organised the national final Eurolaul '99 in order to select its entry for the contest. Ten songs competed in the national final and "Diamond of Night" performed by Evelin Samuel and Camille was selected as the winner by a jury panel.

Estonia competed in the Eurovision Song Contest which took place on 29 May 1999. Performing during the show in position 23, Estonia placed sixth out of the 23 participating countries, scoring 90 points.

== Background ==
Prior to the 1999 Contest, Eesti Televisioon (ETV) had participated in the Eurovision Song Contest representing Estonia five times since its first entry in 1994. Its best result in the contest was fifth, which was achieved in 1996 with the song "Kaelakee hääl" performed by Maarja-Liis Ilus and Ivo Linna. In 1998, "Mere lapsed" performed by Koit Toome placed twelfth.

As part of its duties as participating broadcaster, ETV organises the selection of its entry in the Eurovision Song Contest and broadcasts the event in the country. Since its debut, the broadcaster has organised national finals that feature a competition among multiple artists and songs in order to select its entry for the contest. ETV has organised the Eurolaul competition since 1996 in order to select its entry, with the broadcaster organising Eurolaul 1999 in order to select its 1999 entry.

== Before Eurovision ==
=== Eurolaul '99 ===
Eurolaul 1999 was the sixth edition of the national selection Eurolaul organised by ETV to select its entry for the Eurovision Song Contest 1999. The competition consisted of a ten-song final on 30 January 1999 at ETV's Studio 4 in Tallinn, hosted by Marko Reikop and Romi Erlach and broadcast on ETV.

==== Competing entries ====
On 9 September 1998, ETV opened the submission period for artists and composers to submit their entries up until 7 December 1998. 52 submissions were received by the deadline. A 12-member jury panel selected ten finalists from the submissions and the selected songs were announced on 10 December 1998. Evelin Samuel, Hanna Pruuli, Hedvig Hanson, Kate, Lauri Liiv and Pearu Paulus (member of 2 Quick Start) have all competed in previous editions of Eurolaul. The selection jury consisted of Ivo Linna (singer), Priit Hõbemägi (culture critic), Margus Kappel, Koit Toome (singer), Tõnis Kõrvits (composer and musician), Raivo Sersant (music manager), Paul Mägi (conductor), Heli Pikk (Eesti Raadio head of archives), Kaidi Klein (Raadio 2 presenter), Kirke Ert (Kuku Raadio editor), Erki Berends (Kuku Raadio chief editor) and Allan Roosileht (Raadio 2 music editor).

Artist	Song	Songwriter(s)
2 Quick Start	"Say You Love Me"	Jana Hallas, Pearu Paulus, Ilmar Laisaar, Alar Kotkas
Erik Meremaa	"Day I Lived a Year"	Raivo Hool, Harmo Kallaste
Evelin Samuel and Camille	"Diamond of Night"	Priit Pajusaar, Glen Pilvre, Maian Kärmas, Kaari Sillamaa
Gerli Padar and Why Not	"Aeg kord täidab soovid"	Paul Kikerpuu
Hanna Pruuli and Jakko Maltis	"Mu hääl"	Hanna Pruuli
Hedvig Hanson	"If You Could Only Hear Me"	Hedvig Hanson
Joel De Luna, Mati Kõrts, Jassi Zahharov and Mait Trink	"Opera on Fire"	Rein Rannap
Kate	"Vee ja soola saaga"	Villu Kangur, Aivar Joonas
Lauri Liiv	"Soolo"	Sulev Lõhmus
Maiken	"Didn't I Know"	Jarmo Seljamaa, Kadri Koppel

==== Final ====
The final took place on 30 January 1999. Ten songs competed during the show and a jury selected "Diamond of Night" performed by Evelin Samuel and Camille as the winner. A non-competitive public televote registered 14,676 votes and selected "Opera on Fire" performed by Joel De Luna, Mati Kõrts, Jassi Zahharov and Mait Trink as the winner. The jury panel that voted in the final consisted of Anders Berglund (Swedish composer and conductor), Raimonds Pauls (Latvian maestro), Andrej Karoli (music editor at Radio Slovenia), Björgvin Halldórsson (Icelandic singer), Manfred Witt (music, show and entertainment producer of the German broadcaster NDR), Camila Raznovich (Italian television presenter), Noel Kelehan (Irish conductor), Katrina Leskanich (lead singer of the British band Katrina and the Waves), Nana Mouskouri (Greek singer) and Kobi Oshrat (Israeli composer and conductor).

Final – 30 January 1999
R/O	Artist	Song	Jury Votes										Total	Place
R/O	Artist	Song	A. Berglund	R. Pauls	A. Karoli	B. Halldórsson	M. Witt	C. Raznovich	N. Kelehan	K. Leskanich	N. Mouskouri	K. Oshrat	Total	Place
1	Gerli Padar and Why Not	"Aeg kord täidab soovid"	2	3	2	3	1	5	8	8	1	1	34	10
2	Erik Meremaa	"Day I Lived a Year"	6	5	8	8	5	4	6	3	5	3	53	7
3	Kate	"Vee ja soola saaga"	10	12	6	4	4	12	5	1	12	7	73	2
4	Hedvig Hanson	"If You Could Only Hear Me"	4	10	7	2	2	10	12	4	4	12	67	4
5	Lauri Liiv	"Soolo"	5	2	5	12	8	1	3	10	8	4	58	5
6	Hanna Pruuli and Jakko Maltis	"Mu hääl"	1	1	10	5	3	2	4	2	10	2	40	9
7	Maiken	"Didn't I Know"	7	4	12	7	6	8	7	12	3	6	72	3
8	2 Quick Start	"Say You Love Me"	8	7	3	6	7	3	2	6	2	5	49	8
9	Joel De Luna, Mati Kõrts, Jassi Zahharov and Mait Trink	"Opera on Fire"	3	6	1	1	12	6	1	7	7	10	54	6
10	Evelin Samuel and Camille	"Diamond of Night"	12	8	4	10	10	7	10	5	6	8	80	1

== At Eurovision ==
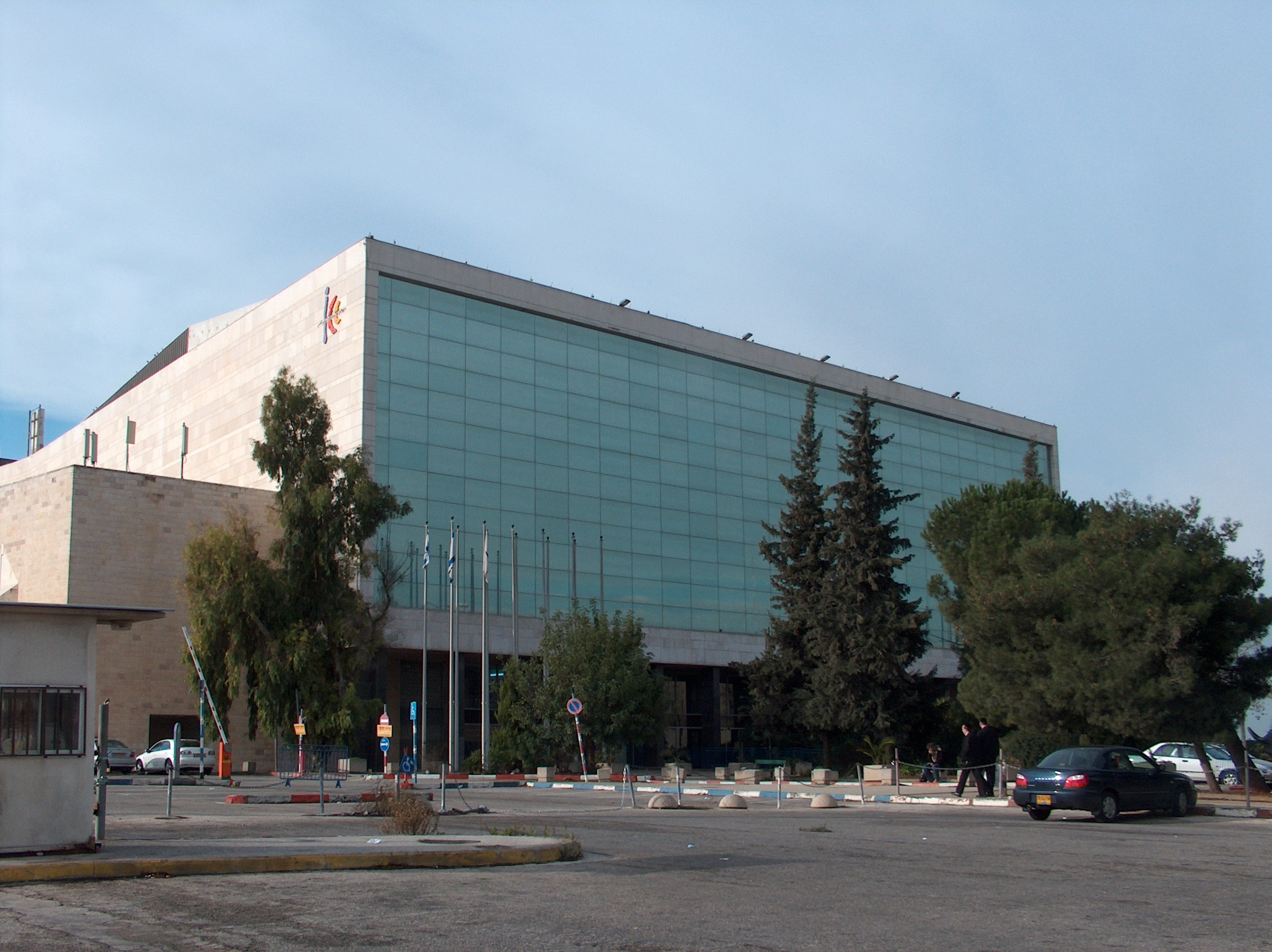
The Eurovision Song Contest 1999 took place at the International Convention Center in Jerusalem, Israel, on 29 May 1999.

The Eurovision Song Contest 1999 took place at the International Convention Center in Jerusalem, Israel, on 29 May 1999. According to the Eurovision rules, the 23-country participant list for the contest was composed of: the previous year's winning country and host nation, the seventeen countries which had obtained the highest average points total over the preceding five contests, and any eligible countries which did not compete in the 1998 contest. On 17 November 1998, an allocation draw was held which determined the running order and Estonia was set to perform last in position 23, following the entry from Bosnia and Herzegovina. Estonia finished in sixth place with 90 points.

The contest was broadcast in Estonia on ETV and via radio on Raadio 2, both with commentary by Marko Reikop. ETV appointed Mart Sander as its spokesperson to announce the results of the Estonian televote during the show.

=== Voting ===
Below is a breakdown of points awarded to Estonia and awarded by Estonia in the contest. The nation awarded its 12 points to the Sweden in the contest.

Points awarded to Estonia
Score	Country
12 points	
10 points	Sweden
8 points	Ireland; Poland; Slovenia
7 points	Malta; Portugal
6 points	Germany
5 points	Netherlands; Norway
4 points	Belgium; Denmark; France
3 points	Austria; Bosnia and Herzegovina; United Kingdom
2 points	Iceland
1 point	Israel; Lithuania; Spain

Points awarded by Estonia
Score	Country
12 points	Sweden
10 points	Iceland
8 points	Austria
7 points	Germany
6 points	Denmark
5 points	Belgium
4 points	Israel
3 points	Croatia
2 points	Lithuania
1 point	Malta
