= Slovenia in the Eurovision Song Contest 1999 =

- Eurovision Song Contest 1999
- Participating broadcaster: Radiotelevizija Slovenija (RTVSLO)
- Country: Slovenia
- Selection process: Evrovizijska Melodija 1999
- Selection date: 26 February 1999

Competing entry
- Song: "For a Thousand Years"
- Artist: Darja Švajger
- Songwriters: Sašo Fajon; Primož Peterca

Placement
- Final result: 11th, 50 points

Participation chronology

Slovenia was represented at the Eurovision Song Contest 1999 with the song "For a Thousand Years", written by Sašo Fajon and Primož Peterca, and performed by Darja Švajger. The Slovene participating broadcaster, Radiotelevizija Slovenija (RTVSLO), held the national final Evrovizijska Melodija 1999 in order to select its entry for the contest. Švajger had previously represented Slovenia in 1995.

17 entries competed in the national final where "Še tisoč let" performed by Darja Švajger was selected as the winner following the combination of votes from a four-member jury panel and a public televote. The song was later translated from Slovene to English for Eurovision and was titled "For a Thousand Years" .

Slovenia competed in the Eurovision Song Contest which took place on 29 May 1999. Performing during the show in position 6, Slovenia placed eleventh out of the 23 participating countries, scoring 50 points.

== Background ==
Prior to the 1999 contest, Radiotelevizija Slovenija (RTVSLO) had participated in the Eurovision Song Contest representing Slovenia five times since its first entry in 1993. Its highest placing in the contest, to this point, has been seventh place, achieved in in 1995 with the song "Prisluhni mi" performed by Darja Švajger. Its only other top ten result was achieved in 1997 when "Zbudi" performed by Tanja Ribič placed tenth. In 1998, "Naj bogovi slišijo" performed by Vili Resnik placed eighteenth.

As part of its duties as participating broadcaster, RTVSLO organises the selection of its entry in the Eurovision Song Contest and broadcasts the event in the country. The broadcaster has traditionally selected its entry through a national final entitled Evrovizijska Melodija (EMA), which has been produced with variable formats. For 1999, RTVSLO opted to organise Evrovizijska Melodija 1999 (EMA 1999) to select its entry.

== Before Eurovision ==
=== Evrovizijska Melodija 1999 ===
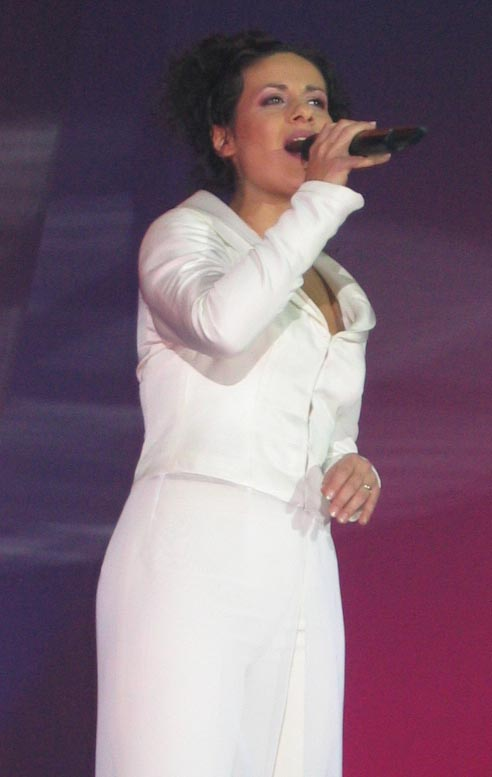
Darja Švajger was selected to represent Slovenia in the Eurovision Song Contest 1999 following her victory at EMA 1999

Evrovizijska Melodija 1999 (EMA 1999) was the fifth edition of the national final format Evrovizijska Melodija (EMA). The competition was used by RTVSLO to select its entry for the Eurovision Song Contest 1999 and took place on 26 February 1999 at its Studio 1 in Ljubljana. The show was hosted by Mojca Mavec and was broadcast on TV SLO 1.

==== Format ====
Seventeen songs competed in a televised show where the combination of points from a four-member expert jury and a public televote selected the winner. Each member of the expert jury assigned scores as follows: 1–8, 10 and 12, while the public televote assigned scores which had a weighting equal to the votes of two jurors. The song that received the highest score when the votes were combined was determined the winner.

==== Competing entries ====
An expert committee consisting of Miša Molk (Head of Entertainment and Sports at RTVSLO), Mojmir Sepe (conductor and composer) and Andrej Karoli (music editor for Radio Slovenija) selected seventeen artists and songs for the competition from 71 received submissions. Among the competing artists was former Slovenian Eurovision entrant Darja Švajger who represented Slovenia in 1995.

Artist	Song	Songwriter(s)
Avia Band	"Ne izdajte me"	Matjaž Vlašič, Urša Vlašič
Babilon	"Kot ocean"	Marijan Merljak, Dada Kladnik, Sebastjan Artič
Darja Švajger	"Še tisoč let"	Primož Peterca
Gianni Rijavec and Vladimir Čadež	"Ljubezen je le ena"	Gianni Rijavec, Miša Čermak
Irena, Damjana and Sanja	"Igra je končana"	Karel Novak, Janez Zmazek
Jan Plestenjak	"Moja dežela"	Jan Plestenjak
Kantor	"Drugačen dan"	Mark Lemer, Tone Košmrlj
Lara Baruca	"Ti si se bal"	Danilo Kocjančič, Drago Mislej
Matjaž Zupan and Californija	"Tisoč kilometrov"	Matjaž Zupan
Mitja	"Čas je da najdem te"	Aleš Berkopec, Mitja Šedlbauer
Monika Tratnik	"Sanje"	Nenad Kokovič, Igor Misdaris
Nude	"Ši'z d bes"	Gaber Marolt, Primož Pogelšek
Nuša Derenda	"Nekaj lepega je v meni"	Matija Oražem, Damjana Kenda Hussu
Sound Attack	"Kje si zdaj"	Simon Šurev, Pika Božič
Tatjana Mihelj	"Dlan okrog srca"	Bor Zuljan, Marjan Kukovec
Tinkara Kovač	"Zakaj"	Marino Legovič, Drago Mislej
Victory	"Le povejte ji"	Martin Štibernik, Karmen Stavec

==== Final ====
EMA 1999 took place on 26 February 1999. In addition to the performances of the competing entries, Marc Roberts, who represented Ireland in 1997, performed as a guest. The combination of points from a four-member jury panel (2/3) and a public televote (1/3) selected "Še tisoč let" performed by Darja Švajger as the winner. The jury consisted of Roberts, Miša Molk (Head of Entertainment and Sports at RTVSLO), Mojmir Sepe (conductor and composer) and Andrej Karoli (music editor for Radio Slovenija).

Final – 26 February 1999
R/O	Artist	Song	Jury		Televote		Total	Place
R/O	Artist	Song	Slovenian jury	Marc Roberts	Votes	Points	Total	Place
1	Mitja	"Čas je da najdem te"	15	7	1,161	0	22	5
2	Tatjana Mihelj	"Dlan okrog srca"	0	1	344	0	1	17
3	Monika Tratnik	"Sanje"	3	0	835	0	3	16
4	Matjaž Zupan and Californija	"Tisoč kilometrov"	4	0	1,308	2	6	15
5	Kantor	"Drugačen dan"	2	5	760	0	7	13
6	Victory	"Le povejte ji"	8	0	4,108	10	18	9
7	Irena, Damjana and Sanja	"Igra je končana"	14	0	3,396	8	22	5
8	Lara Baruca	"Ti si se bal"	22	0	682	0	22	5
9	Sound Attack	"Kje si zdaj"	0	4	1,700	6	10	11
10	Darja Švajger	"Še tisoč let"	32	12	8,465	20	64	1
11	Avia Band	"Ne izdajte me"	10	0	4,493	14	24	4
12	Nuša Derenda	"Nekaj lepega je v meni"	7	3	751	0	10	11
13	Nude	"Ši'z d bes"	3	0	1,431	4	7	13
14	Babilon	"Kot ocean"	5	6	983	0	11	10
15	Tinkara Kovač	"Zakaj"	30	8	8,682	24	62	2
16	Gianni Rijavec and Vladimir Čadež	"Ljubezen je le ena"	3	2	6,777	16	21	8
17	Jan Plestenjak	"Moja dežela"	16	10	4,340	12	38	3

== At Eurovision ==
Slovenia performed in position 6, following the entry from the United Kingdom and before the entry from Turkey. At the contest, Darja Švajger performed the English version of "Še tisoč let", titled "For a Thousand Years". Slovenia finished in eleventh place with 50 points.

The show was televised in Slovenia on RTV SLO1.

=== Voting ===
Below is a breakdown of points awarded to Slovenia and awarded by Slovenia in the contest. The nation awarded its 12 points to Croatia in the contest.

RTVSLO appointed Mira Berginc as its spokesperson to announce the Slovenian votes during the show.

Points awarded to Slovenia
Score	Country
12 points	Croatia; Ireland
10 points	Lithuania
8 points	
7 points	
6 points	Netherlands
5 points	Bosnia and Herzegovina
4 points	
3 points	
2 points	Belgium; Spain
1 point	France

Points awarded by Slovenia
Score	Country
12 points	Croatia
10 points	Bosnia and Herzegovina
8 points	Estonia
7 points	Sweden
6 points	Germany
5 points	Denmark
4 points	Austria
3 points	Netherlands
2 points	United Kingdom
1 point	Israel
