= Israel in the Eurovision Song Contest 2000 =

- Eurovision Song Contest 2000
- Participating broadcaster: Israel Broadcasting Authority (IBA)
- Country: Israel
- Selection process: Internal selection
- Announcement date: 6 January 2000

Competing entry
- Song: "Sameach"
- Artist: PingPong
- Songwriters: Guy Asif; Roy Arad

Placement
- Final result: 22nd, 7 points

Participation chronology

Israel was represented at the Eurovision Song Contest 2000 with the song "Sameach" (שמח), written by Roy Arad and Guy Assif, and performed by the group PingPong. The Israeli participating broadcaster, the Israel Broadcasting Authority (IBA), internally selected its entry for the contest. PingPong and "Sameach" was announced by IBA on 6 January 2000.

Israel competed in the Eurovision Song Contest which took place on 13 May 2000. Performing as the opening entry for the show in position 1, Israel placed twenty-second out of the 24 participating countries, scoring 7 points.

== Background ==
Prior to the 2000 contest, the Israel Broadcasting Authority (IBA) had participated in the Eurovision Song Contest representing Israel twenty-two times since its first entry in 1973. It has won the contest on three occasions: in 1978 with the song "A-Ba-Ni-Bi" by Izhar Cohen and the Alphabeta, in 1979 with the song "Hallelujah" by Milk and Honey, and in 1998 with the song "Diva" by Dana International. Its 1999 entry "Yom Huledet (Happy Birthday)" performed by Eden placed fifth.

As part of its duties as participating broadcaster, Kan organises the selection of its entry in the Eurovision Song Contest and broadcasts the event in the country. To select its entry for 2000, IBA conducted an internal selection to select both the artist and song that would represent Israel.

== Before Eurovision ==
=== Internal selection ===
On 6 January 2000, IBA announced that the group PingPong was selected as its representative for the Eurovision Song Contest 2000 with the song "Sameach". "Sameach" was written by group members Roy Arad and Guy Assif, and was chosen from 83 submissions by a special committee consisting of Irit Linur (radio entertainer and writer), Izhar Cohen (Eurovision Song Contest 1978 winner and 1985 Israeli Eurovision entrant), Amos Oren (journalist), Gal Uchovsky (journalist), Itzik Yehoshua (journalist), Amir Kaminer (journalist), Yoav Ginai (composer), Menashe Lev-Ran (musician), Svetlana Alecsandrov (IBA representative) and Adi Hadar (IBA representative).

The announcement of PingPong as the Israeli entrant caused controversy in the country. Composer Avihu Medina expressed his disapproval on "Sameach" describing it as "a national disgrace", while committee member Yoav Ginai described it as "a nostalgic song with a crazy beat which makes you smile" and Irit Linur stated: "It is a very stupid song but I like it, and there's no need to search for a special meaning in it. Some of us liked it and some went to throw up after we heard it. It is a worthy song. We are not fighting to save the future of Israel here". When Linur was asked whether she thought PingPong stood a chance, she replied: "Who cares?" Despite the mixed reactions, "Sameach" managed to top the Israeli charts the week before the contest.

Results of the internal selection (Top 3) – 6 January 2000
Artist	Song	Songwriter(s)	Points	Place
PingPong	"Sameach" (שמייח)	Roy Arad, Guy Assif	36	1
Ofira Yosefi	"Or Hatikva" (אור תקווה)	Hamutal Ben Ze'ev, Yoram Zadok	35	2
Michal Amdursky	"Luna" (לונה)	Hana Goldberg, Michal Amdursky, Natan Nathanson	34	3

== At Eurovision ==
According to Eurovision rules, the 24-country participant list for the contest was composed of: the previous year's winning country and host nation Sweden, "Big Four" countries, the thirteen countries, which had obtained the highest average points total over the preceding five contests, and any eligible countries which did not compete in the 1999 contest. An allocation draw was held which determined the running order and Israel was set to open the show and perform in position 1, before the entry from the Netherlands. Israel finished in twenty-second place with 7 points.

At the end of the Israeli performance, the members of PingPong waved plastic flags of Israel and Syria. Eytan Fox, who choreographed the performance, stated: "The song is about love and peace so we thought it would be a good idea to use Syrian and Israeli flags, because we would like to have peace with Arab countries. We represent a new kind of Israeli who wants to be normal and have peace. We want to have fun and not go to war, but the right wing is not happy about that message". PingPong's decision to wave Syrian flags on stage enraged the Israeli public and the IBA; the broadcaster earlier threatened the group that they would have to bear all travel expenses themselves if they insisted on the action. The Knesset's Education Committee held a meeting regarding the incident in the weeks after the contest, concluding that PingPong's participation was "a disgrace and a shame to the State of Israel, the Broadcasting Authority and Israeli culture" and that the group were "a band of crooks who misled us in an act of fraud." They also declared that only the public would be responsible for selecting the Israeli entries in the future. A member of IBA, Gil Samsonov, stated that legal actions would be sought against PingPong for their actions.

In Israel, the show was televised live on Channel 1.

=== Voting ===
Below is a breakdown of points awarded to Israel and awarded by Israel in the contest. The nation awarded its 12 points to Denmark in the contest.

IBA appointed Yoav Ginai as its spokesperson to announce the Israeli votes during the show.

Points awarded to Israel
Score	Country
12 points	
10 points	
8 points	
7 points	
6 points	France
5 points	
4 points	
3 points	
2 points	
1 point	Macedonia

Points awarded by Israel
Score	Country
12 points	Denmark
10 points	Russia
8 points	Netherlands
7 points	Norway
6 points	Estonia
5 points	Iceland
4 points	Latvia
3 points	Malta
2 points	Ireland
1 point	United Kingdom
