= Netherlands in the Eurovision Song Contest 1999 =

- Eurovision Song Contest 1999
- Participating broadcaster: Nederlandse Omroep Stichting (NOS)
- Country: Netherlands
- Selection process: Nationaal Songfestival 1999
- Selection date: 14 March 1999

Competing entry
- Song: "One Good Reason"
- Artist: Marlayne
- Songwriters: Tjeerd van Zanen; Alan Michael

Placement
- Final result: 8th, 71 points

Participation chronology

The Netherlands was represented at the Eurovision Song Contest 1999 with the song "One Good Reason", written by Tjeerd van Zanen and Alan Michael, and performed by Marlayne. The Dutch participating broadcaster, Nederlandse Omroep Stichting (NOS), selected its entry for the contest through Nationaal Songfestival 1999. Ten entries competed in the national final on 14 March 1999 where "One Good Reason" performed by Marlayne was selected as the winner following the combination of votes from an eight-member jury panel and a public vote.

The Netherlands competed in the Eurovision Song Contest which took place on 29 May 1999. Performing during the show in position 11, the Netherlands placed eighth out of the 23 participating countries, scoring 71 points. This is the latest contest that Netherlands had the national final and its entry finished in top ten.

== Background ==
Prior to the 1999 contest, Nederlandse Televisie Stichting (NTS) until 1969, and Nederlandse Omroep Stichting (NOS) since 1970, had participated in the Eurovision Song Contest representing the Netherlands forty times since NTS début in the inaugural contest in 1956. They have won the contest four times: in 1957 with the song "Net als toen" performed by Corry Brokken; in 1959 with the song "'n Beetje" performed by Teddy Scholten; in 1969 as one of four countries to tie for first place with "De troubadour" performed by Lenny Kuhr; and finally in 1975 with "Ding-a-dong" performed by the group Teach-In. The Dutch least successful result has been last place, which they have achieved on four occasions, most recently in the 1968 contest. They has also received nul points on two occasions; in 1962 and 1963.

As part of its duties as participating broadcaster, NOS organises the selection of its entry in the Eurovision Song Contest and broadcasts the event in the country. The Dutch broadcasters had used various methods to select the Dutch entry in the past, such as the Nationaal Songfestival, a live televised national final to choose the performer, song or both to compete at Eurovision. However, internal selections have also been held on occasion. In 1998, NOS has organised Nationaal Songfestival in order to select both the artist and song for the contest, a method that was continued for its 1999 entry.

== Before Eurovision ==
=== Nationaal Songfestival 1999 ===
Nationaal Songfestival 1999 was the national final developed by NOS that selected its entry for the Eurovision Song Contest 1999. Ten entries competed in the competition that consisted of a final on 14 March 1999 which took place at the Studio 22 in Hilversum, hosted by Paul de Leeuw and Linda de Mol and was broadcast on TV2. The first part of the national final was watched by 1.9 million viewers in the Netherlands, while the second part was watched by 1.4 million viewers.

==== Competing entries ====
227 submissions were received by the Dutch broadcaster following a submission period and ten competing entries were selected. Five of the entries for the competition came from the public submission which occurred through the decision by a selection commission led by Willem van Beusekom, while the remaining five entries came from composers directly invited by NOS.

Artist	Song	Songwriter(s)	Selection
All Mixed Up	"Forever Night and Day"	Ruben Tewari, Ricardo Leeuwin	Open submission
All of Us	"Maybe Love"	Eeg van Kruysdijk, Ed van Otterdijk	Invited by NOS
Colors	"Positivity"	John Ewbank	Invited by NOS
Deante	"We Don't Live Too Long"	Jerry Wolff, Roger Griffith, Terence Esajas	Open submission
Donya	"Before the Clock Strikes 12"	John van Katwijk	Invited by NOS
Double Date	"E-Mail to Berlin"	Jeroen Flamman, Jeff Porter, Jan Rot	Open submission
Jane	"Dreams"	Tom Bakker, Mark van Toor	Open submission
Marlayne	"One Good Reason"	Tjeerd van Zanen, Alan Michael	Open submission
Roger Happel	"Where Is the Time"	Tjeerd Oosterhuis	Invited by NOS
Tamara	"Coming Home"	Jack Veerman, Jan Keizer, Jan Tuijp	Invited by NOS

==== Final ====
The final took place on 14 March 1999 where ten entries competed. The winner, "One Good Reason" performed by Marlayne, was selected by the 50/50 combination of a public televote and the votes of an expert jury. The viewers and the juries each had a total of 408 points to award. Each juror distributed their points as follows: 1, 2, 3, 4, 5, 6, 8, 10 and 12 points. The viewer vote was based on the percentage of votes each song achieved. For example, if a song gained 10% of the vote, then that entry would be awarded 10% of 408 points rounded to the nearest integer: 41 points. The expert jury panel consisted of Ferdi Bolland (songwriter and producer), Frédérique Spigt (singer), Wessel van Diepen (producer, composer and radio presenter), Harry van Hoof (conductor and composer), Henk Langerak (journalist at Algemeen Dagblad), Charlotte Margiono (opera singer), Dean Gorré (footballer) and Sugar Lee Hooper (singer). In addition to the performances of the competing entries, the show featured Imaani (who represented the United Kingdom in 1998) performing her song "Where Are You?".

Final – 14 March 1999
R/O	Artist	Song	Jury	Televote	Total	Place
1	All Mixed Up	"Forever Night and Day"	19	13	32	8
2	Tamara	"Coming Home"	33	50	83	4
3	Colors	"Positivity"	42	26	68	6
4	Jane	"Dreams"	66	30	96	3
5	All of Us	"Maybe Love"	21	9	30	9
6	Donya	"Before the Clock Strikes 12"	30	25	55	7
7	Double Date	"E-Mail to Berlin"	13	6	19	10
8	Roger Happel	"Where Is the Time"	55	27	82	5
9	Deante	"We Don't Live Too Long"	52	51	103	2
10	Marlayne	"One Good Reason"	77	171	248	1

Detailed Jury Votes
R/O	Song	F. Bolland	F. Spigt	W. van Diepan	H. van Hoof	H. Langerak	C. Margiono	D. Gorré	S.L. Hooper	Total
1	"Forever Night and Day"	2	2	3	1	2	4	3	2	19
2	"Coming Home"	4			4	12	3	5	5	33
3	"Positivity"	6	3	12	3	4	6	4	4	42
4	"Dreams"	8	6	10	6	10	10	8	8	66
5	"Maybe Love"		1	2	5	6	5	1	1	21
6	"Before the Clock Strikes 12"	3	5	4	10	1	2	2	3	30
7	"E-Mail to Berlin"	1	4	8						13
8	"Where Is the Time"	5	10	1	8	3	8	10	10	55
9	"We Don't Live Too Long"	10	8	5	2	8	1	12	6	52
10	"One Good Reason"	12	12	6	12	5	12	6	12	77

=== Criticism ===
As a result of the modified rules for the 1999 contest that allowed participants to perform in any language, a majority of the submitted songs for the national final were in English and the ten selected songs were all performed in English as well. Democrats 66 member Boris Dittrich claimed that "the Dutch language and identity has lost out to commercial considerations" and called on NOS as well as the Dutch State Secretary to influence the submission of Dutch songs in the following years. NOS spokesperson Fred de Vries later explained that language and commercial considerations were not part of the selection criteria for the commission which only chose the finalists based on quality.

== At Eurovision ==
Netherlands performed in position 11, following the entry from France and before the entry from Poland. The Netherlands finished in eighth place with 71 points.

The show was broadcast in the Netherlands on TV2 with commentary by Willem van Beusekom. The show was watched by 5.3 million viewers.

=== Voting ===
Below is a breakdown of points awarded to the Netherlands and awarded by the Netherlands in the contest. The nation awarded its 12 points to the Germany in the contest.

NOS appointed Edsilia Rombley, who represented the Netherlands in 1998, as its Dutch spokesperson to announce the Dutch votes during the show.

Points awarded to the Netherlands
Score	Country
12 points	Belgium
10 points	
8 points	United Kingdom
7 points	Denmark
6 points	Iceland; Israel
5 points	Turkey
4 points	Austria; Bosnia and Herzegovina; Lithuania; Sweden
3 points	Slovenia; Spain
2 points	Malta; Portugal
1 point	Ireland

Points awarded by the Netherlands
Score	Country
12 points	Germany
10 points	Belgium
8 points	Sweden
7 points	Iceland
6 points	Slovenia
5 points	Estonia
4 points	Israel
3 points	Bosnia and Herzegovina
2 points	Austria
1 point	Croatia
