= Sameach =

2000 song by PingPong

"Sameyakh"
- Enhanced CD cover

Single by PingPong

from the album Between Moral and Fashion
- Language: Hebrew
- Released: 6 January 2000
- Recorded: 1999
- Genre: Techno, pop
- Label: Hed Arzi Music
- Songwriters: Guy Asif; Roy Arad

Eurovision Song Contest 2000 entry
- Country: Israel
- Artists: Roy Arad; Guy Assif; Ahal Eden; Yifat Giladi
- As: PingPong
- Language: Hebrew
- Composers: Guy Asif; Roy Arad
- Lyricists: Guy Asif; Roy Arad

Finals performance
- Final result: 22nd
- Final points: 7

Entry chronology
- ◄ "Yom Huledet (Happy Birthday)" (1999)
- "En Davar" (2001) ►

"Sameyakh" or "Sameach" (Hebrew script: שמייח; meaning "happy") is a song by the techno / pop band PingPong, a quartet consisting of Guy Asif, Roy Arad, Yifat Giladi, and Ahal Eden. The song represented Israel in the Eurovision Song Contest 2000.

== Themes ==
The song describes an Israeli woman on a kibbutz who appears to be depressed, having a torrid affair with a Damascus man, who appears in the video in a traditional headdress, or keffiyeh. It makes references to wars and natural disasters such as floods, and when the reference to the cucumber is made, the singers sing into cucumbers. It also used the suggestive line "I want to do it with him all day long".

== Eurovision ==
The group had originally entered the contest as a joke. At the end of the performance the group waved small flags of both Israel and Syria; the waving of the Flag of Syria led to the performance being disendorsed by the Israeli Broadcasting Authority after the group had refused to withdraw the use of the flag for the final. The performance also garnered controversy when the group, at the last minute, decided to sing the song's English title ("Be Happy") in place of the Hebrew title, after previously having stated that they would sing the song entirely in Hebrew.

The song qualified for the Eurovision Song Contest after defeating 83 other acts earlier in the year, without incident. However, upon brandishing the new dance and flag routine at the dress rehearsal, which coincided with Independence Day of Israel, Israeli talkbalk radio and newspapers were inundated with complaints at a period when Israel had withdrawn from southern Lebanon due to guerrilla attacks by the Hezbollah militia, which was supported by a Syrian government which did not recognise Israel's sovereignty. Upon being disendorsed, Gil Samsonov, the chairman of the Israeli Broadcasting Authority stated that PingPong would have to pay for the costs of entering the competition, saying "They will compete there, but not on behalf of the Israeli Broadcasting Authority or the Israeli people… They are representing only themselves." It was the last straw for the IBA after the group had released its video clip for the song the previous month, which included male-male kissing and suggestive acts with a cucumber. "It started with sexual provocation and now it has turned to political provocation," Mr Samsonov said. "What is this meant to be about? Everyone knows that the Israeli people want peace with Syria".

The song was performed first on the night, preceding the Netherlands' Linda with "No Goodbyes". At the close of voting, it had received 7 points, placing 22nd in a field of 24.

The artistic director of the band, the film director Eytan Fox defended the performance despite noting the protests ― "As soon as we got off the stage, the faxes started coming from Israel saying not to appear with the Israeli and Syrian flags". He refused to back down claiming that the song was a peace message ― "The song is about love and peace so we thought it would be a good idea to use Syrian and Israeli flags, because we would like to have peace with Arab countries,". Fox claimed that his group was being targeted by conservative facets of society, stating "We represent a new kind of Israeli who wants to be normal and have peace. We want to have fun and not go to war, but the right wing is not happy about that message."

== Legacy ==
The song also went to the top of the Israeli charts, despite being shunned by the Eurovision voters.

It was succeeded as Israeli representative at the 2001 contest by Tal Sondak with "En Davar".

== Sources ==
- Kennedy O'Connor, John (2005). The Eurovision Song Contest: The Official History.
