= Malta in the Eurovision Song Contest 1994 =

- Eurovision Song Contest 1994
- Participating broadcaster: Public Broadcasting Services (PBS)
- Country: Malta
- Selection process: National final
- Selection date: 5 February 1994

Competing entry
- Song: "More Than Love"
- Artist: Chris and Moira
- Songwriters: Christopher Scicluna; Moira Stafrace

Placement
- Final result: 5th, 97 points

Participation chronology

Malta was represented at the Eurovision Song Contest 1994 with the song "More Than Love", composed by Christopher Scicluna, with lyrics by Moira Stafrace, and performed by themselves as Chris and Moira. The Maltese participating broadcaster, Public Broadcasting Services (PBS), selected its entry for the contest through a national final.

== Before Eurovision ==
=== National final ===
Public Broadcasting Services (PBS) held the national final on 5 February 1994 at the Mediterranean Conference Centre in Valletta, hosted by Lucienne Selvagi and John Bundy.

R/O	Artist	Song	Place
1	Georgina Abela	"Remember the Beginning"	3
2	Chris and Moira	"More Than Love"	1
3	Renato Micallef	"The Shadow of a Dream"	4
4	Phylisienne Brincat	"Tell Me Why"	5
5	Ray Caruana	"Scarlet Song"	2

== At Eurovision ==
Chris and Moira performed 12th on the night of the contest, following Romania and preceding Netherlands. At the close of the voting the song had received 97 points (including maximum 12 points from Bosnia and Herzegovina), placing 5th of 25. The Maltese jury awarded its 12 points to Slovakia.

The contest was broadcast on TVM.

=== Voting ===
Points awarded to Malta
Score	Country
12 points	Bosnia and Herzegovina
10 points	Ireland; Romania; Slovakia
8 points	
7 points	Croatia; Estonia; Greece; Lithuania
6 points	Finland; Switzerland
5 points	
4 points	Portugal; Sweden
3 points	Germany
2 points	Cyprus
1 point	Netherlands; United Kingdom

Points awarded by Malta
Score	Country
12 points	Slovakia
10 points	Croatia
8 points	Switzerland
7 points	Bosnia and Herzegovina
6 points	Romania
5 points	Ireland
4 points	Greece
3 points	Sweden
2 points	Poland
1 point	Portugal
