= Cyprus in the Eurovision Song Contest 1999 =

- Eurovision Song Contest 1999
- Participating broadcaster: Cyprus Broadcasting Corporation (CyBC)
- Country: Cyprus
- Selection process: Diagonismós Tragoudioú Giourovízion 1999: Epilogí Tis Kypriakís Symmetochís
- Selection date: 9 February 1999

Competing entry
- Song: "Tha 'nai erotas"
- Artist: Marlain
- Songwriters: George Kallis; Andreas Karanikolas

Placement
- Final result: 22nd, 2 points

Participation chronology

Cyprus was represented at the Eurovision Song Contest 1999 with the song "Tha 'nai erotas", composed by George Kallis, with lyrics written by Andreas Karanikolas. The song was performed by singer Marlain. The Cypriot participating broadcaster, the Cyprus Broadcasting Corporation (CyBC), selected the entry through a national final titled Diagonismós Tragoudioú Giourovízion 1999: Epilogí Tis Kypriakís Symmetochís (Διαγωνισμός Τραγουδιού Γιουροβίζιον 1999: Επιλογή Της Κυπριακής Συμμετοχής; Eurovision Song Contest 1999: Selection of the Cypriot Entry)

The national final saw nine songs compete for the opportunity to represent the nation. The event was held on 9 February 1999 and the winner was decided by a panel of media personalities. Angelidou's song received the most votes and was selected to represent Cyprus in the contest. Angelidou's performance was the 14th performed at the contest on 29 May 1999 and finished in 22nd place after voting had finished. Despite at one point being first in betting odds to win the contest, the entry received only two points in total, all from the United Kingdom.

== Background ==
Prior to the 1999 contest, the Cyprus Broadcasting Corporation (CyBC) had participated in the Eurovision Song Contest representing Cyprus 17 times since its first entry in 1981. It participated yearly, only missing the 1988 contest when its selected song "Thimame", performed by Yiannis Dimitrou, was disqualified for being previously released. By the 1999 contest, its best placing was fifth, achieved twice: the first occurrence being in 1982 with the song "Mono i agapi" performed by Anna Vissi and the second in 1997 with "Mana mou" performed by Hara and Andreas Constantinou. Its least successful result was in 1986 when the country came last with the song "Tora zo" by Elpida, receiving four points in total. Similar to previous years, CyBC opted to host a national final format to select the Cypriot entry.

== Before Eurovision ==
=== National final ===
==== Competing entries ====
The Cyprus Broadcasting Corporation (CyBC) opened a submission period for songs until 18 December 1998. By the end of the submission period, 66 entries had been submitted. On 17 January 1999, in a radio room the CyBC studios, a 14-member jury listened to the received submissions and chose ten songs to compete in the national final. The selection was done in two stages. The songs were first listened to and the jury then voted and selected 30 entries. From those 30 entries, the ten competing entries for the national final were selected. Prior to the final, "24 chronia" was withdrawn by its composer, Aristos Moschovakis, with production problems cited as the reason.

Competing entries
| Artist | Song | Songwriter(s) |
|---|---|---|
| Christina Saranti | "Adeio fengari" (Άδειο φεγγάρι; Empty moon) | Michalis Konstantinidis, Christos Konstantinidis, Kyriakos Pastidis |
| Dimos Beke | "Tha sou edina oli mou ti zoi" (Θα σου έδινα όλη μου τη ζωή; I would give you my whole life) | Dimos Beke, Zinonas Zindilis |
| Elena Tsolaki | "Aspro fengari" (Άσπρο φεγγάρι; White moon) | Marios Takousis, Poly Georgiou Takousi |
| Giorgos Gavriel | "Poios erotas glykos" (Ποιος έρωτας γλυκός; What sweet love) | Michalis Antoniou, Christos Christofi |
| Giorgos Stamataris | "Maria" (Μαρία; Maria) | Giannos Savvidis, Vicky Efstathiou |
| Lucas Christodolou | "An gyriseis" (Αν γυρίσεις; If you come back) | Theos Kallias, Elena Pravitsioti |
| Marlain Angelidou | "Tha'nai erotas" (Θα’ναι έρωτας; It will be love) | George Kallis, Andreas Karanikolas |
| Riana Athanasiou | "Moni" (Μόνη; Alone) | Gavriel Savva |
| Stelios Constantas | "Methysmeno fengari" (Μεθυσμένο φεγγάρι; Drunken moon) | Loukas Xenofontos, Tonia Hatzikosti |

==== Final ====
"Tha 'nai erotas" was composed by George Kallis (pictured in 2010)

The final was broadcast live at 21:00 (EET) on RIK 1 and Cyprus SAT on 9 February 1999 in a show titled Diagonismós Tragoudioú Giourovízion 1999: Epilogí Tis Kypriakís Symmetochís (Διαγωνισμός Τραγουδιού Γιουροβίζιον 1999: Επιλογή Της Κυπριακής Συμμετοχής; Eurovision Song Contest 1999: Selection of the Cypriot Entry). The contest was held at the Monte Caputo Nightclub in Limassol, and was hosted by CyBC journalist and presenter Loukas Hamatsos. The winner was chosen by a 21-member jury, one of whom was Thanos Kalliris who had represented Greece in 1987 as part of the group Bang.

The winning song was "Tha 'nai erotas", composed by George Kallis, with lyrics by Andreas Karanicolas, and performed by Marlain Angelidou. Angelidou had previously attempted to represent Cyprus the previous year as part of a duo and came second behind Michalis Hatzigiannis in the 1998 Final. In addition to the performances of the competing entries, singers Hatzigiannis, Konstantina, and Spyros Spyrakos also performed during the show.

Final – 9 February 1999
| R/O | Artist | Song | Points | Place |
|---|---|---|---|---|
| 1 | Marlain Angelidou | "Tha 'nai erotas" (Θα’ναι έρωτας) | 225 | 1 |
| 2 | Riana Athanasiou | "Moni" (Μόνη) | 107 | 7 |
| 3 | Elena Tsolaki | "Aspro fengari" (Άσπρο φεγγάρι) | 116 | 5 |
| 4 | Christina Saranti | "Adeio fengari" (Άδειο φεγγάρι) | 102 | 8 |
| 5 | Stelios Constantas | "Methysmeno fengari" (Μεθυσμένο φεγγάρι) | 125 | 4 |
| 6 | Giorgos Stamataris | "Maria" (Μαρία) | 143 | 3 |
| 7 | Lucas Christodolou | "An gyriseis" (Αν γυρίσεις) | 113 | 6 |
| 8 | Giorgos Gavriel | "Poios erotas glykos" (Ποιος έρωτας γλυκός) | 88 | 9 |
| 9 | Dimos Beke | "Tha sou edina oli mou ti zoi" (Θα σου έδινα όλη μου τη ζωή) | 178 | 2 |

Detailed Jury Votes
| R/O | Song | Jury | | | | | | | | | | | | | | | | | | | | | Total |
| R/O | Song | 1 | 2 | 3 | 4 | 5 | 6 | 7 | 8 | 9 | 10 | 11 | 12 | 13 | 14 | 15 | 16 | 17 | 18 | 19 | 20 | 21 | Total |
|---|---|---|---|---|---|---|---|---|---|---|---|---|---|---|---|---|---|---|---|---|---|---|---|
| 1 | "Tha 'nai erotas" | 12 | 12 | 10 | 12 | 12 | 8 | 8 | 12 | 12 | 12 | 12 | 8 | 10 | 12 | 5 | 12 | 12 | 12 | 8 | 12 | 12 | 225 |
| 2 | "Moni" | 7 | 2 | 3 | 3 | 10 | 5 | 4 | 10 | 3 | 4 | 2 | 6 | 3 | 4 | 6 | 2 | 4 | 7 | 5 | 10 | 7 | 107 |
| 3 | "Aspro fengari" | 8 | 4 | 5 | 10 | 4 | 4 | 3 | 6 | 6 | 7 | 5 | 3 | 7 | 10 | 7 | 4 | 3 | 10 | 4 | 2 | 4 | 116 |
| 4 | "Adeio fengari" | 6 | 3 | 7 | 2 | 5 | 6 | 5 | 7 | 2 | 10 | 3 | 4 | 2 | 7 | 4 | 3 | 2 | 3 | 12 | 6 | 3 | 102 |
| 5 | "Methysmeno fengari" | 4 | 8 | 4 | 7 | 3 | 7 | 10 | 2 | 5 | 5 | 7 | 5 | 6 | 6 | 3 | 5 | 10 | 5 | 10 | 7 | 6 | 125 |
| 6 | "Maria" | 3 | 6 | 12 | 5 | 6 | 12 | 6 | 4 | 8 | 6 | 10 | 10 | 8 | 2 | 2 | 10 | 8 | 6 | 7 | 4 | 8 | 143 |
| 7 | "An gyriseis" | 2 | 7 | 6 | 8 | 7 | 3 | 2 | 8 | 7 | 3 | 6 | 7 | 4 | 3 | 10 | 6 | 5 | 4 | 2 | 8 | 5 | 113 |
| 8 | "Poios erotas glykos" | 5 | 5 | 2 | 4 | 2 | 2 | 7 | 3 | 4 | 2 | 4 | 2 | 5 | 5 | 12 | 8 | 6 | 2 | 3 | 3 | 2 | 88 |
| 9 | "Tha sou edina oli mou ti zoi" | 10 | 10 | 8 | 6 | 8 | 10 | 12 | 5 | 10 | 8 | 8 | 12 | 12 | 8 | 8 | 7 | 7 | 8 | 6 | 5 | 10 | 178 |

=== Promotion ===
To promote the entry, an event was held at Zoo nightclub in Cyprus where Angelidou and her team were greeted by media while the music video of "Tha 'nai erotas" played in the background. The song was commercially released by record label Malvina Music.

== At Eurovision ==
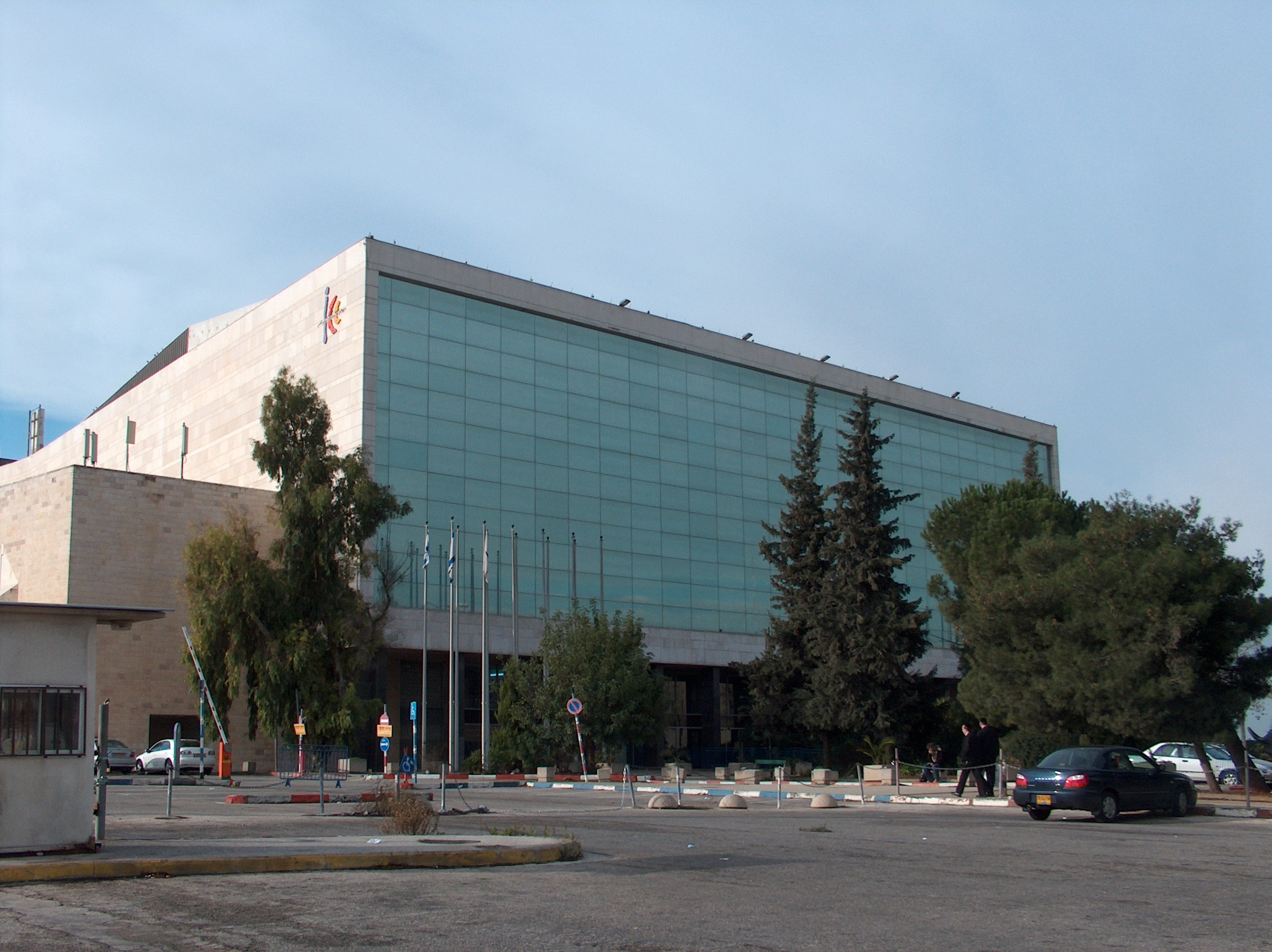
The Eurovision Song Contest 1999 took place at the International Convention Center in Jerusalem.

The Eurovision Song Contest 1999 took place at the International Convention Center in Jerusalem on 29 May 1999. According to Eurovision rules, the 23-country participant list for the contest was composed of the winning country from the previous year's contest, the 17 countries, other than the previous year's winner, which had obtained the highest average number of points over the last five contests, and any countries which had not participated in the previous year's content. Cyprus was one of the 17 countries with the highest average scores, and thus were permitted to participate. The running order for the contest was decided by a draw held on 17 November 1998; Cyprus was assigned position 14, following Iceland and preceding Sweden.

Prior to the contest, the nation had reached first place in betting odds in April, which prompted a Cypriot delegation representative to respond at a CyBC press conference, saying they would prefer to not win due to the costs of hosting the next year and would instead prefer to place a "respectable second". By late May, however, the British company Ladbrokes had shown Cyprus falling to a predicted sixth place. Despite the odds, the entry only received two points, both from the United Kingdom, placing 22nd out of 23, beating only Spain. Andrew Adamides from Cyprus Mail wrote in a summary of the contest that Cyprus' poor placing was thought to be attributed to this being the first contest where an entry could be performed in any language (Cyprus' entry was performed in Greek, while the winning song was performed in English) and possibly due to political voting. For her performance, Angelidou was joined by backing vocalists Nicole Jones and Lina Kawar.

=== Voting ===
The same voting system in use since 1975 was again implemented for this event, with each country providing 1–8, 10 and 12 points to the ten highest-ranking songs as determined by a selected jury or the viewing public through televoting, with countries not allowed to vote for themselves. This was the second contest to feature widespread public voting, and Cyprus opted to implement this method to determine which countries would receive their points, with an 8-member back-up jury assembled in case technical failures rendered the telephone votes invalid. Around 15,000 calls were registered in Cyprus in total during the five-minute voting window, which determined the points awarded by Cyprus to the other participating nations.

Points awarded to Cyprus
| Score | Country |
|---|---|
| 12 points | |
| 10 points | |
| 8 points | |
| 7 points | |
| 6 points | |
| 5 points | |
| 4 points | |
| 3 points | |
| 2 points | United Kingdom |
| 1 point | |

Points awarded by Cyprus
| Score | Country |
|---|---|
| 12 points | Iceland |
| 10 points | Israel |
| 8 points | Denmark |
| 7 points | Norway |
| 6 points | Sweden |
| 5 points | Lithuania |
| 4 points | United Kingdom |
| 3 points | Malta |
| 2 points | Croatia |
| 1 points | Austria |
