= Germany in the Eurovision Song Contest 1999 =

- Eurovision Song Contest 1999
- Participating broadcaster: ARD (Note: Arbeitsgemeinschaft der öffentlich-rechtlichen Rundfunkanstalten der Bundesrepublik Deutschland) – Norddeutscher Rundfunk (NDR)
- Country: Germany
- Selection process: Internal selection among Countdown Grand Prix 1999 entries
- Announcement date: 16 March 1999

Competing entry
- Song: "Reise nach Jerusalem – Kudüs'e Seyahat"
- Artist: Sürpriz
- Songwriters: Ralph Siegel; Bernd Meinunger

Placement
- Final result: 3rd, 140 points

Participation chronology

Germany was represented at the Eurovision Song Contest 1999 with the song "Reise nach Jerusalem – Kudüs'e Seyahat", composed by Ralph Siegel, with lyrics by Bernd Meinunger, and performed by the group Sürpriz. The German participating broadcaster on behalf of ARD, Norddeutscher Rundfunk (NDR), organised the national final Countdown Grand Prix 1999 in order to select their entry for the contest. The national final took place on 12 March 1999 and featured eleven competing acts with the winner being selected through public televoting. "Hör den Kindern einfach zu" performed by Corinna May was originally selected as the German entry after gaining 32.6% of the votes, however the song was disqualified for having been released in 1997 by another act and replaced with runner-up "Reise nach Jerusalem – Kudüs'e Seyahat" performed by Sürpriz.

Germany competed in the Eurovision Song Contest which took place on 29 May 1999. Performing during the show in position 21, Germany placed third out of the 23 participating countries with 140 points.

== Background ==
Prior to the 1999 Contest, ARD had participated in the Eurovision Song Contest representing Germany forty-two times since its debut in 1956. It has won the contest on one occasion: in 1982 with the song "Ein bißchen Frieden" performed by Nicole. Germany, to this point, has been noted for having appeared in the contest more than any other country; they have competed in every contest since the first edition in 1956 except for 1996 when it was eliminated in a pre-contest elimination round. In 1998, the German entry "Guildo hat euch lieb!" performed by Guildo Horn placed seventh out of twenty-five competing songs scoring 86 points.

As part of its duties as participating broadcaster, ARD organises the selection of its entry in the Eurovision Song Contest and broadcasts the event in the country. Since 1996, ARD had delegated the participation in the contest to its member Norddeutscher Rundfunk (NDR). NDR had set up national finals with several artists to choose both the song and performer to compete at Eurovision for Germany. The broadcaster organised a multi-artist national final in cooperation to select its entry for the 1999 contest.

== Before Eurovision ==
=== Countdown Grand Prix 1999 ===
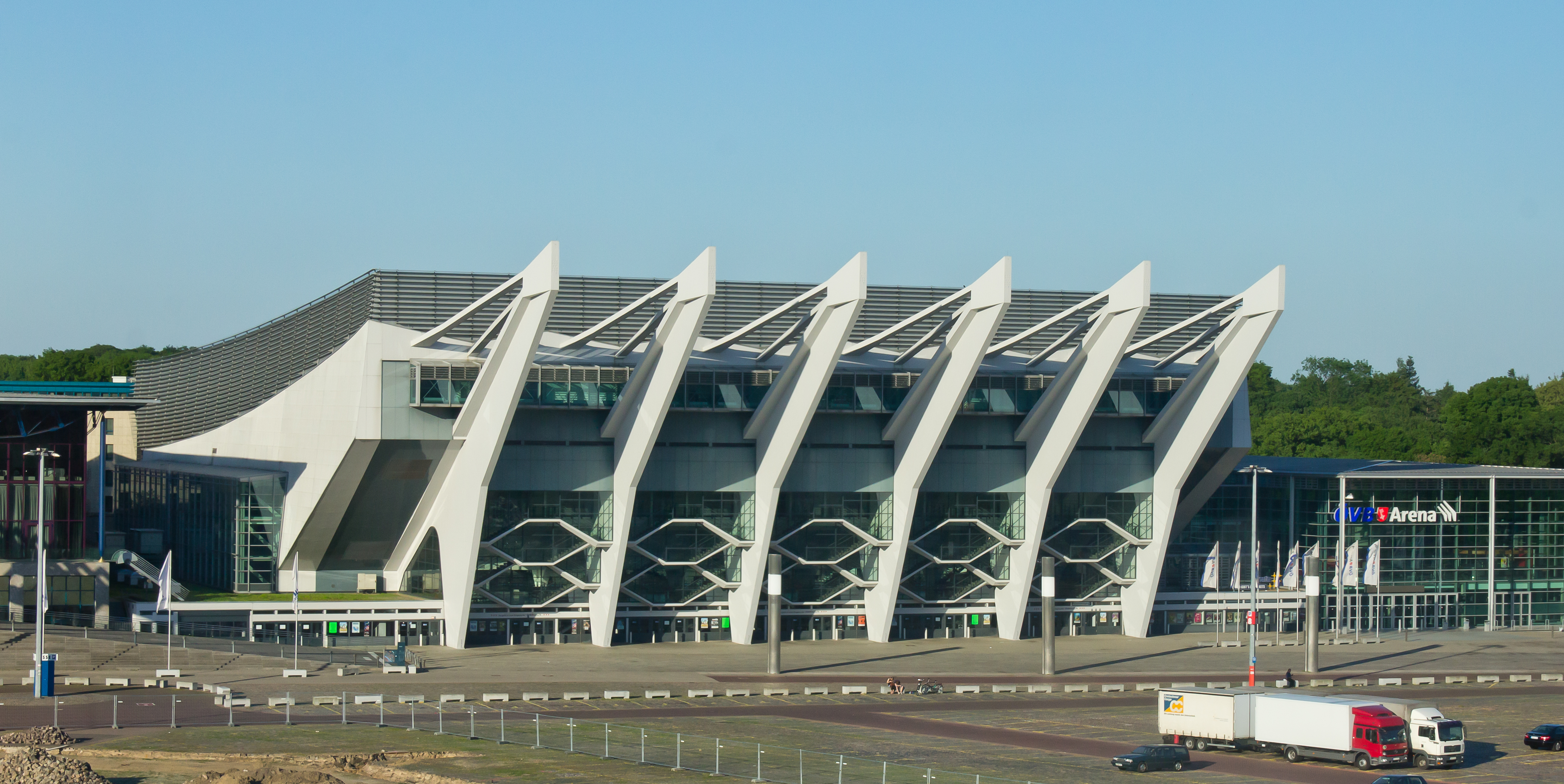
The Stadthalle in Bremen was the host venue of Countdown Grand Prix 1999

Countdown Grand Prix 1999 was the competition organised by NDR to select its entry for the Eurovision Song Contest 1999. The competition took place on 12 March 1999 at the Stadthalle in Bremen, hosted by Axel Bulthaupt and Sandra Studer (who represented Switzerland in 1991) and broadcast on Das Erste as well as in Switzerland on SF 2. Eleven acts competed during the show with the winner being selected through a public televote. The national final was watched by 5.63 million viewers in Germany with a market share of 18.7%.

==== Competing entries ====
11 acts were selected by a panel consisting of representatives of the German Phono Academy from proposals received from record companies, while an additional act, Michael von der Heide, was provided by the Swiss-German broadcaster SF DRS. Among the competing artists was Wind which represented Germany in 1985, in 1987, and in 1992. One of the participating acts, "Verdammt, ich lieb dich - immer noch" written by Bernd Dietrich and Matthias Reim and to have been performed by Matthias Reim, was withdrawn prior to the competition.

Artist	Song	Songwriter(s)
Carol Bee	"Lover Boy"	Candy DeRouge, Carol Bee
Cathrin	"Together We're Strong"	Hermann Weindorf, Peter Bischof-Fallenstein
Corinna May	"Hör den Kindern einfach zu"	Frank Zumbroich
Elvin	"Heaven"	Andreas Linse, Eric Brodka
Jeanette Biedermann	"Das tut unheimlich weh"	Andreas Bärtels, Rick Rossi, Kristina Bach
Megasüß	"Ich habe meine Tage"	Windsor Robinson, Jürgen Magdziak, Claus Funke
Michael von der Heide	"Bye Bye Bar"	Thomas Fessler, Jeannot Steck, Micha Lewinsky
Naima	"Itsy Bitsy Spider"	Oliver Göddecke, Alexander Seidl, Robert Parr
Patrick Lindner	"Ein bißchen Sonne, ein bißchen Regen"	Alfons Weindorf, Bernd Meinunger
Sürpriz	"Reise nach Jerusalem – Kudüs'e Seyahat"	Ralph Siegel, Bernd Meinunger
Wind	"Lost in Love"	Norbert Beyerl, Werner Schüler

==== Final ====
The televised final took place on 12 March 1999. The winner, "Hör den Kindern einfach zu" performed by Corinna May, was selected solely through public televoting held in Germany and Switzerland. In addition to the performances of the competing entries, the interval acts featured the Israeli singer Noa, the Israeli saxophonist Giora Feidman and the German music producer Thomas M. Stein. 681,000 votes were cast in the final.

Winner

Final – 12 March 1999
R/O	Artist	Song	Televote	Place
1	Jeanette Biedermann	"Das tut unheimlich weh"	12.2%	4
2	Carol Bee	"Lover Boy"	Unknown	7
3	Patrick Lindner	"Ein bißchen Sonne, ein bißchen Regen"	Unknown	6
4	Megasüß	"Ich habe meine Tage"	Unknown	8
5	Sürpriz	"Reise nach Jerusalem – Kudüs'e Seyahat"	16.2%	2
6	Elvin	"Heaven"	Unknown	9
7	Corinna May	"Hör den Kindern einfach zu"	32.6%	1
8	Naima	"Itsy Bitsy Spider"	Unknown	11
9	Michael von der Heide	"Bye Bye Bar"	Unknown	5
10	Wind	"Lost in Love"	Unknown	10
11	Cathrin	"Together We're Strong"	15.9%	3

=== Disqualification and replacement ===
On 16 March 1999, it was announced that Corinna May had been disqualified as her song was released on CD in 1997 by the German band Number Nine under the title "Where Have All the Good Times Gone?", contrary to the Eurovision Song Contest rules. Runner-up of the national final, "Reise nach Jerusalem – Kudüs'e Seyahat" performed by Sürpriz, therefore replaced May as the German entry for the 1999 contest. Despite claims that "Reise nach Jerusalem – Kudüs'e Seyahat" had similarities with the song "Wo geht die Reise hin?", released in 1984 by the German group Harmony Four, the entry was allowed to participate in the contest following a review by the European Broadcasting Union (EBU) and the Israel Broadcasting Authority (IBA).

== At Eurovision ==
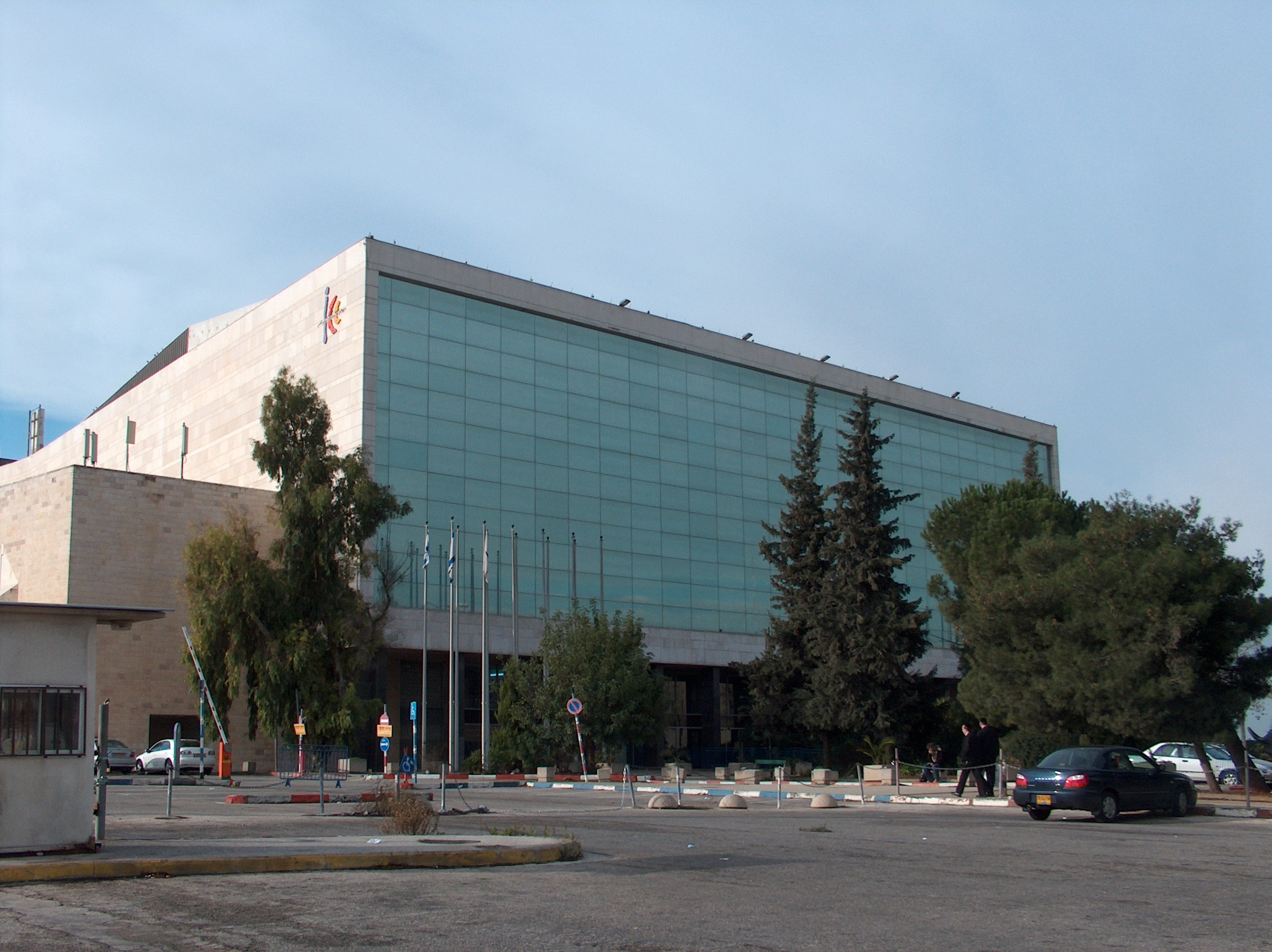
The Eurovision Song Contest 1999 took place at the International Convention Center in Jerusalem, Israel, on 29 May 1999.

The Eurovision Song Contest 1999 took place at the International Convention Center in Jerusalem, Israel, on 29 May 1999. According to the Eurovision rules, the 23-country participant list for the contest was composed of: the previous year's winning country and host nation, the seventeen countries which had obtained the highest average points total over the preceding five contests, and any eligible countries which did not compete in the 1998 contest. Germany was one of the seventeen countries with the most average points and thus was permitted to participate. On 17 November 1998, an allocation draw was held which determined the running order and Germany was set to perform in position 21, following the entry from Malta and before the entry from Bosnia and Herzegovina. Germany finished in third place with 140 points.

In Germany, the show was broadcast on Das Erste, with commentary by Peter Urban. The show was watched by 4.79 million viewers in Germany.

=== Voting ===
Below is a breakdown of points awarded to Germany and awarded by Germany in the contest. The nation awarded its 12 points to Turkey in the contest.

NDR appointed Renan Demirkan as its spokesperson to announce the top 12-point score awarded by the German televote.

Points awarded to Germany
Score	Country
12 points	Israel; Netherlands; Poland; Portugal; Turkey
10 points	Austria; Belgium; Bosnia and Herzegovina
8 points	France
7 points	Estonia; Spain
6 points	Slovenia
5 points	Denmark; Iceland
4 points	
3 points	Croatia; Malta; Norway
2 points	Sweden
1 point	United Kingdom

Points awarded by Germany
Score	Country
12 points	Turkey
10 points	Croatia
8 points	Bosnia and Herzegovina
7 points	Israel
6 points	Estonia
5 points	Austria
4 points	Poland
3 points	Iceland
2 points	Sweden
1 point	Malta
