= Yom Huledet =

"Yom Huledet (Happy Birthday)"

Single by Eden

from the album Yom Huledet
- Released: 1999
- Genre: Pop/Rock
- Length: 3:00
- Label: Hed Arzi Music
- Composers: Yitzhak Baranes; Moshe Datz; Ya'akov Lamai; Jacky Oved
- Lyricists: Yitzhak Baranes; Gabriel Butler; Ya'akov Lamai; Jacky Oved
- Producers: Ya'akov Lamai; Jacky Oved

Eurovision Song Contest 1999 entry
- Country: Israel
- Artists: Eddie Butler; Gabriel Butler; Rafael Dahan; Doron Oren
- As: Eden
- Languages: Hebrew, English

Finals performance
- Final result: 5th
- Final points: 93

Entry chronology
- ◄ "Diva" (1998)
- "Sameyakh" (2000) ►

"Yom Huledet (Happy Birthday)" (Hebrew: יום הולדת; meaning "Birthday") was the Israeli entry in the Eurovision Song Contest 1999, performed in Hebrew and English by Eden. The song was written by Yitzhak Baranes, Ya'akov Lamai, Jacky Oved, and Gabriel Butler, and composed by Baranes, Lamai, Oved, and Moshe Datz; Datz previously produced the Israeli Eurovision entry in 1995, as well as represented Israel in Eurovision in 1991 as part of Duo Datz with "Kan".

== Composition ==
The song is a lively and fast-paced tune, showcasing the Contest's growing emphasis on dance-friendly music. In the song, the band sings about the simple happiness of having a birthday and enjoying it with a party. The song's sound is somewhat reminiscent of American music, influenced by two of the singers, Eddie and Gabriel Butler, who are Black Israelites. Notably, their inclusion marked the first instance of black participants representing Israel at Eurovision.

According to Ya'akov Lamai, the song started out as a lower tempo song entirely in English. The song was then rearranged by its four composers, together with producer Shlomo Tzach, into an up-tempo number with a mix of mostly Hebrew lyrics with some English lyrics sprinkled in the chorus and throughout.

== At the Eurovision Song Contest ==
The song was performed nineteenth on the night, following Austria's Bobbie Singer with "Reflection" and preceding Malta's Times Three with "Believe 'n Peace". At the close of voting, it had received 93 points, placing 5th in a field of 23.

It was succeeded as Israeli representative at the 2000 contest by PingPong with "Sameyakh".

== Reception ==
The song, and the album of the same name, did well commercially. Mako's Roie Hacohen named the song as the most iconic Israeli one-hit wonder, citing the fact the song is played in "almost every Israeli birthday party". Aya Hayut of ynet also described the song as "one of the most listened to in every house in Israel" due to its popularity in birthdays.

== Charts ==
=== Weekly charts ===
Weekly chart performance for "Yom Huledet (Happy Birthday)"
Chart (1999)	Peak position
Israel (IBA)	1

=== Year-end charts ===
1999 year-end chart performance for "Yom Huledet (Happy Birthday)"
Chart (1999)	Peak position
Israel (IBA)	6
