= Malta in the Eurovision Song Contest 1999 =

- Eurovision Song Contest 1999
- Participating broadcaster: Public Broadcasting Services (PBS)
- Country: Malta
- Selection process: Malta Song for Europe 1999
- Selection date: 20 February 1999

Competing entry
- Song: "Believe 'n Peace"
- Artist: Times Three
- Songwriters: Christopher Scicluna; Moira Stafrace

Placement
- Final result: 15th, 32 points

Participation chronology

Malta was represented at the Eurovision Song Contest 1999 with the song "Believe 'n Peace", composed by Christopher Scicluna, with lyrics by Moira Stafrace, and performed by Times Three. The Maltese participating broadcaster, Public Broadcasting Services (PBS), selected its entry through a national final.

== Before Eurovision ==
=== Malta Song for Europe 1999 ===
Public Broadcasting Services (PBS) held the national final on 19 and 20 February 1999 at the Mediterranean Conference Centre in Valletta, hosted by Mariella Scerri and Joseph Chetcuti. 16 songs competed, and the winner was decided by an expert jury.

Georgina and Paul Giordimaina represented Malta in 1991, and Georgina was also a backing singer in 1996. Claudette Pace would go on to represent the country in 2000. Fabrizio Faniello would follow suit in both in 2001 and in 2006, and Olivia Lewis would do the same in 2007.

R/O	Artist	Song	Songwriter(s)	Points	Place
1	Alexander Schembri	"Night Has Fallen"	Sunny Aquilina, Jason Paul Cassar	74	6
2	Lawrence Gray	"The Right Time"	Philip Vella, Paul Abela	114	2
3	Fabrizio Faniello	"Thankful for Your Love"	Alfred C. Sant, Ray Agius	71	8
4	Tarcisio Barbara	"Takes Me Higher"	Alfred C. Sant, Tarcisio Barbara	23	16
5	Claudette Pace	"Breathless"	Gerard James Borg, Philip Vella	75	5
6	Nadine Axisa and Rita Pace	"Hold My Hand"	Rita Pace, Marika Axisa	25	15
7	Alison Ellul	"Give Me Love"	Doris Chetcuti, Eugenio Schembri	33	14
8	Georgina	"Who Will Be There"	Georgina Abela, Paul Abela	79	3
9	Olivia Lewis	"Autumn of My Love"	Doris Chetcuti, Mark Debono	73	7
10	Charlene and Natasha Grima	"Look Into My Eyes"	Natasha Grima, Charlene Grima	68	9
11	Times Three	"Believe 'n Peace"	Moira Stafrace, Christopher Scicluna	119	1
12	Mark Tonna	"Heartbeat"	Doris Chetcuti, Mark Debono	52	11
13	Leontine	"You're the Reason"	Julian Farrugia, Renato Briffa	77	4
14	Marvic Lewis	"It Is You"	Doris Chetcuti, Eugenio Schembri	42	13
15	Paul Giordimaina	"I Believe Again"	Fleur Balzan, Paul Giordimaina	45	12
16	Joe Mizzi	"Love Will Find the Way"	Roberto Longo, Gino Micallef, Joe Mizzi, John Mizzie	54	10

Detailed Jury Votes
R/O	Song	Juror							Total
R/O	Song	1	2	3	4	5	6	7	Total
1	"Night Has Fallen"	11	10	11	14	12	4	12	74
2	"The Right Time"	18	16	16	16	18	14	16	114
3	"Thankful for Your Love"	12	11	7	9	5	18	9	71
4	"Takes Me Higher"	1	1	2	10	6	1	2	23
5	"Breathless"	14	5	9	11	14	12	10	75
6	"Hold My Hand"	3	3	3	8	2	2	4	25
7	"Give Me Love"	4	4	1	12	3	3	6	33
8	"Who Will Be There"	20	6	4	20	20	8	1	79
9	"Autumn of My Love"	6	18	10	7	7	7	18	73
10	"Look Into My Eyes"	2	12	14	6	8	10	14	68
11	"Believe 'n Peace"	5	20	20	18	16	20	20	119
12	"Heartbeat"	10	8	8	1	11	9	5	52
13	"You're the Reason"	9	14	18	5	9	11	11	77
14	"It Is You"	7	9	6	2	4	6	8	42
15	"I Believe Again"	16	2	5	4	10	5	3	45
16	"Love Will Find the Way"	8	7	12	3	1	16	7	54

== At Eurovision ==
The song received 32 points, finishing 15th.

=== Voting ===
Points awarded to Malta
Score	Country
12 points	
10 points	
8 points	
7 points	Austria; Bosnia and Herzegovina
6 points	Croatia; United Kingdom
5 points	
4 points	
3 points	Cyprus
2 points	
1 point	Estonia; Germany; Portugal

Points awarded by Malta
Score	Country
12 points	Sweden
10 points	Iceland
8 points	United Kingdom
7 points	Estonia
6 points	Israel
5 points	Croatia
4 points	Denmark
3 points	Germany
2 points	Netherlands
1 point	Lithuania
