= Israel in the Eurovision Song Contest 2001 =

- Eurovision Song Contest 2001
- Participating broadcaster: Israel Broadcasting Authority (IBA)
- Country: Israel
- Selection process: Kdam Eurovision 2001
- Selection date: 28 December 2000

Competing entry
- Song: "Ein Davar"
- Artist: Tal Sondak
- Songwriters: Yair Klinger; Shimrit Orr

Placement
- Final result: 16th, 25 points

Participation chronology

Israel was represented at the Eurovision Song Contest 2001 with the song "Ein Davar", composed by Yair Klinger, with lyrics by Shimrit Orr, and performed by Tal Sondak. The Israeli participating broadcaster, the Israel Broadcasting Authority (IBA), selected its entry through Kdam Eurovision 2001.

== Before Eurovision ==
=== Kdam Eurovision 2001 ===
The Israel Broadcasting Authority (IBA) held the national final on 28 December 2000 at the Neve Ilan TV Studios in Jerusalem, hosted by Duo Datz and broadcast on Channel 1. Twelve entries competed and the winner was selected by a combination of the votes from five voting groups: three regional juries jury groups (18%), an expert jury of IBA representatives (29%) and votes from the public (53%). The winner was "En Davar" performed by Tal Sondak, and composed by Yair Klinger, with lyrics by Shimrit Orr.

Final – 28 December 2000
R/O	Artist	Song	Songwriter(s)	Regional Juries	Expert Jury	Public	Total	Place
1	Shimi Ron	"Eretz Me'usheret"	Doron Davidsko, Eli Nissman	16	0	63	79	7
2	Alon Jan	"Dr. D.J."	Baruch Friedland, Yigal Perchuk	6	10	9	25	10
3	Mangana	"Corazón"	Edith Mish	8	20	27	55	9
4	Dafna Armoni and Dror Lukach	"Ad Ktze Ha'olam"	Alon More	10	15	0	25	10
5	Gabi Shushan	"Olam Nifla"	Merav Sarig, Yossi Peretz	12	5	0	17	12
6	Tal Sondak	"En Davar"	Yair Klinger, Shimrit Orr	30	35	108	173	1
7	Hamsa	"Darbuka"	Dror Margalit, Eyal Buchbut, Arlet Tzfadia	11	50	54	115	3
8	Sharon Lavie and Shachar Ankri	"Ze Karov"	Ehud Manor, Boaz Sharabi	11	30	18	58	8
9	Michal Amdursky	"Luna"	Hana Goldberg, Michal Amdursky, Natan Nathanson	16	0	90	106	4
10	Sagiv Cohen	"Umlala La La"	Sagiv Cohen	27	25	36	88	6
11	Tze'ela Achrak	"Yeshua"	Itzik Cohen, Efi Shoshani	14	40	45	99	5
12	Vered Gover	"Bein Hachalomot"	Itzik Yitzken	14	60	72	146	2

Detailed Regional Jury Votes
R/O	Song	Haifa	Tel Aviv	Jerusalem	Total
1	"Eretz Me'usheret"	5	8	3	16
2	"Dr. D.J."	6			6
3	"Corazón"	4	4		8
4	"Ad Ktze Ha'olam"		5	5	10
5	"Olam Nifla"	2	2	8	12
6	"En Davar"	10	10	10	30
7	"Darbuka"	7		4	11
8	"Ze Karov"	3	6	1	10
9	"Luna"	8	1	7	16
10	"Umlala La La"	12	3	12	27
11	"Yeshua"	1	7	6	14
12	"Bein Hachalomot"		12	2	14

== At Eurovision ==
"En Davar" was performed fifth on the night, following Norway and preceding Russia. At the close of voting, it had received 25 points, placing 16th in a field of 23.

=== Voting ===
Points awarded to Israel
Score	Country
12 points	
10 points	France
8 points	
7 points	Turkey
6 points	Bosnia and Herzegovina
5 points	
4 points	
3 points	
2 points	Greece
1 point	

Points awarded by Israel
Score	Country
12 points	Spain
10 points	Greece
8 points	Sweden
7 points	Denmark
6 points	Estonia
5 points	Netherlands
4 points	Lithuania
3 points	Russia
2 points	France
1 point	Slovenia
