= Israel in the Eurovision Song Contest 1999 =

- Eurovision Song Contest 1999
- Participating broadcaster: Israel Broadcasting Authority (IBA)
- Country: Israel
- Selection process: Internal selection
- Announcement date: 17 January 1999

Competing entry
- Song: "Yom Huledet (Happy Birthday)"
- Artist: Eden
- Songwriters: Moshe Datz; Gabriel Butler; Ya'akov Lamai; Jacky Oved

Placement
- Final result: 5th, 93 points

Participation chronology

Israel was represented at the Eurovision Song Contest 1999 with the song "Yom Huledet (Happy Birthday)", written by Moshe Datz, Gabriel Butlerm Ya'akov Lamai, and Jacky Oved, and performed by the group Eden. The Israeli participating broadcaster, the Israel Broadcasting Authority (IBA), internally selected its entry for the contest. In addition, IBA was also the host broadcaster and staged the event at the International Convention Centre in Jerusalem, after winning the previous edition with the song "Diva" by Dana International.

IBA announced its entry on 17 January 1999. Israel was drawn to compete nineteenth in the contest, held on 29 May 1999. At the end of the night, the nation placed 5th in the field of 23 entries, receiving 93 points.

== Before Eurovision ==
=== Internal selection ===
The Israel Broadcasting Authority (IBA) received 900 songs from the public, which were subsequently evaluated by a special committee that shortlisted four songs. On 17 January 1999, IBA announced that Eden were selected as its representatives for the Eurovision Song Contest 1999 with the song "Yom Huledet".

Internal Selection – 17 January 1999
Artist	Song	Points	Place
Eden	"Yom Huledet" (יום הולדת)	64	1
Sharon Lavie and Shachar Ankri	"Ze Karov"	40	2
Efrat Roten	"Tfila La'elef Haba"	30	3
Sarit Hadad	"Welcome Ya Salam"	24	4

== At Eurovision ==
Israel performed 19th on the night of the contest, following Austria and preceding Malta. At the close of voting it had received 93 points and finished in 5th place.

=== Voting ===
Points awarded to Israel
Score	Country
12 points	
10 points	Cyprus; France; Poland
8 points	Croatia; Portugal; Spain
7 points	Germany
6 points	Malta
5 points	
4 points	Estonia; Netherlands
3 points	Belgium; Sweden; Turkey
2 points	Bosnia and Herzegovina; Denmark; Norway
1 point	Austria; Iceland; Slovenia

Points awarded by Israel
Score	Country
12 points	Germany
10 points	Iceland
8 points	Sweden
7 points	Croatia
6 points	Netherlands
5 points	Belgium
4 points	United Kingdom
3 points	Lithuania
2 points	Denmark
1 point	Estonia
