= Lonely Symphony (We Will Be Free) =

1994 single by Frances Ruffelle

Single by Frances Ruffelle
- B-side: "Is This a Broken Heart?"
- Released: 4 April 1994
- Genre: Pop
- Length: 4:03
- Label: Virgin
- Songwriters: George De Angelis; Mark Dean
- Producer: George De Angelis

Eurovision Song Contest 1994 entry
- Country: United Kingdom
- Artist: Frances Ruffelle
- Language: English
- Composers: George De Angelis; Mark Dean
- Lyricists: George De Angelis; Mark Dean
- Conductor: Michael Reed

Finals performance
- Final result: 10th
- Final points: 63

Entry chronology
- ◄ "Better the Devil You Know" (1993)
- "Love City Groove" (1995) ►

"Lonely Symphony (We Will be Free)" was the United Kingdom entry at the Eurovision Song Contest 1994 in Dublin, Ireland. The song was written by George De Angelis and Mark Dean and sung by English musical theatre actress and singer Frances Ruffelle in English. It was released by Virgin Records on 4 April 1994, and peaked at number 25 on the UK Singles Chart.

== At Eurovision ==
Performing sixth on the night, following Iceland's Sigga singing "Nætur" and preceding Croatia's Tony Cetinski singing "Nek' ti bude ljubav sva", it received 63 points and placed 10th in a field of twenty-five.

It was succeeded as the UK representative by Love City Groove with "Love City Groove".

== Critical reception ==
Mark Frith from Smash Hits gave the song three out of five, writing, "Everyone makes jokes about the Eurovision Song Contest, but we all want to win really. Frances Ruffelle is a rather wonderful, gutsy singer who could sing the London phone directory and make it sound good. And guess what? She just has! Well almost. This pleasant, atmospheric gospel song is the last thing that wins Eurovision. But after repeated listens it's wonderful."

== Track listing ==
No.	Title	Length
1.	"Lonely Symphony (We Will Be Free)"	4:03
2.	"Lonely Symphony (We Will Be Free) (extended [intro] version)"	6:30
3.	"Is This a Broken Heart?"	4:05
4.	"Is This a Broken Heart? (Damaged mix)"	5:50

== Charts ==
=== Weekly charts ===
Chart (1994)	Peak position
Australia (ARIA)	188
Israel (Israeli Singles Chart)	1
UK Singles (OCC)	25

=== Year-end charts ===
Chart (1994)	Position
Israel (Israeli Singles Chart)	39
UK Singles (OCC)	199
