= Bosnia and Herzegovina in the Eurovision Song Contest 1994 =

- Eurovision Song Contest 1994
- Participating broadcaster: Radiotelevision of Bosnia-Herzegovina (RTVBiH)
- Country: Bosnia and Herzegovina
- Selection process: Artist: Internal selection Song: BH Eurosong 1994
- Selection date: 26 February 1994

Competing entry
- Song: "Ostani kraj mene"
- Artist: Alma and Dejan
- Songwriters: Adi Mulahalilović; Edo Mulahalilović

Placement
- Final result: 15th, 39 points

Participation chronology

Bosnia and Herzegovina was represented at the Eurovision Song Contest 1994 with the song "Ostani kraj mene", composed by Adi Mulahalilović, with lyrics by Edo Mulahalilović, and performed by Alma and Dejan. The Bosnian-Herzegovinian participating broadcaster, Radiotelevision of Bosnia-Herzegovina (RTVBiH), selected its entry for the contest through a national final, after having previously selected the performers internally.

== Before Eurovision ==
=== BH Eurosong 1994 ===
Radiotelevision of Bosnia-Herzegovina (RTVBiH) announced at the end of 1993 that it had internally selected Alma Čardžić as its representative in the Eurovision Song Contest 1994, and it was subsequently decided that she would be accompanied by Dejan Lazarević. Alma previously participated in Jugovizija 1992 and BH Eurosong 1993. A total of 39 songs were submitted to the competition, and 8 were chosen to be performed by Alma and Dejan at the national final.

RTVBiH held the national final at its television studios in Sarajevo on 26 February 1994, hosted by Ismeta Krvavac. Alma and Dejan recorded videoclips of all 8 songs, but only about 1 minute of each song was shown. An expert jury chose the winner, and only the name of the winning song was announced.

Final – 26 February 1994
R/O	Song
1	"Probaj"
2	"Hajde, pjesmo"
3	"Ljubavna"
4	"Ostani kraj mene"
5	"Volim te"
6	"Poljubi me"
7	"Pjevam za druge"
8	"Nije to kraj, moj anđele"

== At Eurovision ==
Alma and Dejan performed 18th on the night of the contest, following Norway and preceding Greece. At the close of voting the duo received 39 points, placing 15th of the 25 competing countries. The Bosnian jury awarded its 12 points to Malta.

=== Voting ===
Points awarded to Bosnia and Herzegovina
Score	Country
12 points	
10 points	France
8 points	Slovakia
7 points	Malta; Spain
6 points	
5 points	
4 points	Croatia
3 points	
2 points	Finland
1 point	Hungary

Points awarded by Bosnia and Herzegovina
Score	Country
12 points	Malta
10 points	Ireland
8 points	Poland
7 points	Germany
6 points	Norway
5 points	Austria
4 points	United Kingdom
3 points	Hungary
2 points	France
1 point	Finland
