= Perikles (band) =

Swedish dansband

- Origin: Ystad, Sweden
- Genres: Dansband; schlager; pop
- Years active: 1974–present
- Members: Anders Olsson; Pex Svensson; Jan Wellbo; Lars Lundgren; Joachim Sehlin
- Website: perikles.se

Perikles is a Swedish dansband that was established in 1974. Its biggest chart singles are "Var ska vi sova i natt?", a cover version of "Sarà perché ti amo". The band has released many albums that include its own songs and cover versions. Perikles took part in Melodifestivalen 1994 with the song "Vill du resa till månen med mig?" in a bid to represent Sweden in the Eurovision Song Contest 1994.

== Personnel ==
Current members

- Anders Olsson – vocals, guitars, keyboards (1974–present)
- Pex Svensson – bass, vocals (1974–present)
- Jan Wellbo – vocals, keyboards (1974–present)
- Lars Lundgren – vocals, guitars, keyboards (1989–present)
- Joachim Sehlin – drums, vocals (2008–present)

Former members

- Göran Sonesson – drums, vocals (1995–2008)
- Henri Saffer – guitars, saxophone (1983–1984)
- Stefan Forslund – drums, vocals (1985–1995)
- Peter Persson – keyboards (1974–1977)
- Kent Nilsson – drums (1974–1985)
- Jan (Jens) Persson – vocals (1974–1977)
- Tommy Frank – vocals, keyboards, saxophone (1977–?)
- Jan Svensson – vocals, guitars (1982)
- Janne Ljungdahl – vocals (1978–1982)
- Marianne Olsson - vocals, piano (1974–1975)

== Discography ==
- Alla tiders bil (1976)
- Jag vill vara den du ringer till (1977)
- 3 (1978)
- Marie, Marie (1982)
- Ljuva livet (1984)
- Live 3 (1993)
- Namn & Nummer (1993)
- Vill du resa till månen med mej? (1994)
- Fifty-Fifty (1997)
- Härligt! (2000)
- Varning för hunden (2008)
- Vicken Fest (2013)
- Ge mig ditt namn Ge mig ditt nummer (2014)
- Heta pojkars flickor (2015)
- Ett, Två - Let's Go (2017)
- Den coolaste bruden i byn (2019)

== Singles ==
- 1982: "Marie, Marie"
- 1982: "Var ska vi sova i natt"
- 1989: "It should have been me" / "När mörkret faller på"
- 1991: "Sofia"
- 1993: "Var ska vi sova i natt?"
- 1994: "Vill du resa till månen med mig?" (Melodifestivalen 1994)
- 1996: "Susanna"
- 2000: "Kom och värm mig"
- 2001: "Var ska vi sova i natt?"
- 2005: "Vi lever"
