= Hungary in the Eurovision Song Contest 1994 =

- Eurovision Song Contest 1994
- Participating broadcaster: Magyar Televízió (MTV)
- Country: Hungary
- Selection process: Táncdalfesztivál 1994
- Selection date: 5 February 1994

Competing entry
- Song: "Kinek mondjam el vétkeimet?"
- Artist: Friderika Bayer
- Songwriter: Szilveszter Jenei

Placement
- Final result: 4th, 122 points

Participation chronology

Hungary was represented at the Eurovision Song Contest 1994 with the song "Kinek mondjam el vétkeimet?", written by Szilveszter Jenei, and performed by Friderika Bayer. The Hungarian participating broadcaster, Magyar Televízió (MTV), selected its entry through a national final. This was the first-ever entry from Hungary in the Eurovision Song Contest, and the first-ever entry performed in Hungarian in the contest, after MTV was unable to debut in the previous contest by failing to pass the qualifying round.

== Before Eurovision ==
=== Táncdalfesztivál 1994 ===
Táncdalfesztivál 1994 was organised by Magyar Televízió (MTV) to select its entry for the Eurovision Song Contest 1994. The contest consisted of three semi-finals and a final held over four weeks which were all hosted by Dorottya Geszler and held in the MTV studios in Budapest.

==== Competing entries ====
MTV received 963 songs from which 45 were chosen to compete in Táncdalfesztivál 1994.

==== Semi-finals ====
The semi-finals were held on 15, 22, and 29 January 1994. Each semi-final had a 20-member jury panel, representing the 19 counties of Hungary and Budapest, who each awarded between 1 and 9 points per song with the top four in each semi-final going to the final. One more finalist was chosen by an audience vote in every semi-final.

Artists who are known to have competed but aren't listed below are: Róbert Szikora, Dolly Roll, András Payer, Annamária Sasvári, and Péter Poór.

Marcellina performed the song "Feltaláltad a fájdalmat című szerzeményt" in either the second or third semi-final.

Jury qualifier Audience vote qualifier

Semi-Final 1 – 15 January 1994
Artist	Song	Points	Place
Kata Janza	"Úgy vártalak"	169	1
Andrea Szulák	"Fenn a szabad ég"	163	2
Grażyna Kowalczyk and Lui	"Úgy gondolj rám"	153	3
Ágnes Bogolin	"A pillanat"	142	4
Boldizsár László	"Vége már"	141	5
Gábor Majsai	Unknown	133	6
Apostol	Unknown	129	7
Andrea Tohai	"Várj még"	121	8
Janula Stefanidu	Unknown	120	9
Magdi Bódy	Unknown	118	10
Martony Klári	"Ennyi volt"	110	11
Kriszta Kránitz	Unknown	103	12
Edit Clapton	Unknown	97	13
Szénási Pál Bertalan	Unknown	86	14
Károly Kadlott	Unknown	77	15

It is known that the winner of the second semi-final received 140 points.

Semi-Final 2–22 January 1994
Artist	Song	Points	Place
Kati Bontovics	"Gyere haza"	Unknown	Unknown
László Gombos	"Szívemben élsz"	Unknown	Unknown
Maya Vas	"Tavaszváróval"	Unknown	Unknown
Unknown	"Az élet egyszer mindent visszakér"	Unknown	Unknown
Albatross	Unknown	Unknown	Unknown
Emőd Oláh	Unknown	Unknown	Unknown
Gábor Varga	Unknown	Unknown	Unknown
Attila Horváth	Unknown	Unknown	Unknown

Semi-Final 3 – 29 January 1994
Artist	Song	Points	Place
Enikő Détár and Pál Makrai	"Miért pont én"	Unknown	Unknown
Rita Pap and Attila Bodnár	"Az élet megy tovább"	Unknown	Unknown
Gábor Király	"Add a kezed"	Unknown	Unknown
Anikót Domány	Unknown	Unknown	Unknown
Enikőt Gáspár	Unknown	Unknown	Unknown
Jánost Szabolcsi	Unknown	Unknown	Unknown
Rokanok	Unknown	Unknown	Unknown
Lavina	Unknown	Unknown	Unknown

==== Final ====
There were 15 songs in the final with the winner being chosen by a 16-member jury who each awarded between 1 and 9 points per song. Votes were given out generously as "Kinek mondjam el vétkeimet?" received only 4 points short of the maximum total possible, and even the last placed song had an average score of 6.1.

A non-competitive public vote conducted through televoting was also held and selected "Az élet megy tovább" performed by Rita Pap and Attila Bodnár as the winner with 4,518 votes.

Final – 5 February 1994
R/O	Artist	Song	Points	Place
1	Zsolt Bognár	"Eszembe jutott"	102	14
2	Adrienne, Csaba and the 4 Nem Piskóta	"Elmentél"	116	9
3	Kati Bontovics	"Gyere haza"	116	9
4	Andrea Szulák	"Fenn a szabad ég"	134	3
5	Beáta Karda	"Könyörgés a kedvesemért"	138	2
6	Kata Janza	"Úgy vártalak"	127	5
7	Enikő Détár and Pál Makrai	"Miért pont én"	122	6
8	Grażyna Kowalczyk and Lui	"Úgy gondolj rám"	130	4
9	László Gombos	"Szívemben élsz"	118	8
10	Rita Pap and Attila Bodnár	"Az élet megy tovább"	109	12
11	Friderika Bayer	"Kinek mondjam el vétkeimet?"	140	1
12	Kati Farkas	"Remélni kell"	120	7
13	Boldizsár László	"Vége már"	106	13
14	Tamás Aczél and Új Rákfogó	"Jó leszek"	98	15
15	Ágnes Bogolin	"A pillanat"	116	9

== At Eurovision ==
On the night of the final Bayer performed 22nd in the running order, following Spain and preceding Russia. "Kinek mondjam el vétkeimet?" got off to the a strong start in the voting, receiving maximum 12s from the first three juries (Sweden, Finland, and Ireland). However the votes received then became more mixed, with only one further 12 (from Poland) and six juries bypassing the song altogether. At the close of voting "Kinek mondjam el vétkeimet?" had received 122 points, placing Hungary 4th of the 25 entries, which remains the country's best Eurovision placement to date.

The contest was broadcast on MTV2, with commentary by István Vágó.

=== Voting ===
Points awarded to Hungary
Score	Country
12 points	Finland; Ireland; Poland; Sweden
10 points	Iceland; Netherlands
8 points	Austria; Norway
7 points	France; Germany
6 points	
5 points	Croatia
4 points	Estonia; Switzerland
3 points	Bosnia and Herzegovina; Russia
2 points	Romania; United Kingdom
1 point	Portugal

Points awarded by Hungary
Score	Country
12 points	Germany
10 points	Ireland
8 points	Poland
7 points	Portugal
6 points	Russia
5 points	Norway
4 points	Greece
3 points	United Kingdom
2 points	Sweden
1 point	Bosnia and Herzegovina
