= Nina Morato =

French singer

- Birth name: Stéphanie Morato
- Also known as: Stéphanie; Stéphanie de Malakoff
- Born: 2 March 1966 (age 59); Paris, France
- Genres: Pop
- Occupations: Singer; songwriter
- Years active: 1983–present

Stéphanie Morato (born 2 March 1966), known professionally as Nina Morato, is a French singer and songwriter. Morato is best known for representing France in the Eurovision Song Contest 1994 with the song "Je suis un vrai garçon", where she placed seventh.

== Early career ==
Morato recorded several singles under the names Stéphanie and Stéphanie de Malakoff before the release in 1993 of "Maman", her first single under the name Nina Morato. This was followed by an album Je suis la mieux, which was a critical success and won Morato the 1994 Victoires de la Musique prize in the category 'Best New Female Pop Artist of the Year'. Je suis la mieux featured guitarist Matthieu Chedid, who toured with Morato.

== Eurovision Song Contest ==
In 1994, Morato's song "Je suis un vrai garçon" ("I'm a Real Boy") was chosen as the French entry for the 39th Eurovision Song Contest, held on 30 April in Dublin. Controversy arose over the lyric "Je sais je suis son amour, mais putain, y'a des jours où c'est lourd", roughly translated as "I know I'm his love, but fuck it, there are days which are hard". Concerns were expressed that this contravened Eurovision rules on verbal obscenities, but in the end the line was allowed to stand.

"Je suis un vrai garçon" was a daring and risky song for Eurovision at the time, but had the fortune to be drawn to be performed last of the 25 participating entries. Morato, in an all-black outfit – including leotard, jacket, velvet top hat and high-heeled thigh boots – was joined on stage by Chedid, and delivered a confident performance, which resulted in a seventh-place finish.

== Later career ==
In 1994, Morato appeared in the film La séparation, with Isabelle Huppert and Daniel Auteuil. Her second album, L'allumeuse, was released in 1996, but was less successful. It was followed in 1999 by the darker Moderato, heavily by influenced the personal tragedy of the death of her 11-year-old daughter, born of her relationship with David Christie. Contributors to Moderato included Arthur H and Lokua Kanza and it was widely seen as Morato's best work.

Morato has spent recent years touring and appearing in stage productions such as The Vagina Monologues.

== Discography ==
Albums

- 1993: Je suis la mieux
- 1996: L'allumeuse
- 1999: Moderato

Preceded by Patrick Fiori with Mama Corsica	France in the Eurovision Song Contest; 1994	Succeeded by Nathalie Santamaria with Il me donne rendez-vous
