= Kinek mondjam el vétkeimet? =

1994 single by Friderika Bayer

Single by Friderika Bayer

from the album Friderika
- Language: Hungarian
- Released: 27 April 1994
- Length: 3:24
- Label: EMI-Quint
- Songwriter: Sziveszter Jenei

Eurovision Song Contest 1994 entry
- Country: Hungary
- Artist: Friderika Bayer
- Language: Hungarian
- Composer: Szilveszter Jenei
- Lyricist: Szilveszter Jenei
- Conductor: Péter Wolf

Finals performance
- Final result: 4th
- Final points: 122

Entry chronology
- "Új név a régi ház falán" (1995) ►

"Kinek mondjam el vétkeimet?" (Hungarian pronunciation: [ˈkinɛk ˈmoɲɟɒm ˈɛl ˈveːtkɛjimɛt]; "To whom shall I tell my sins?") is a song by Hungarian singer Friderika Bayer. Written and composed by Szilveszter Jenei, it represented Hungary in the Eurovision Song Contest 1994 in Dublin. It marked Hungary's debut performance in the contest.

== Background and release ==
The song was written and composed by Szilveszter Jenei. According to an interview with Bayer, Jenei had originally written the song for singer Sarolta Zalatnay, but it remained unreleased.

The single was released on 27 April 1994 by EMI-Quint and also featured the song's English-language version ("Who Will Be There"), along with the tracks "Születésnap" ("Birthday") and "Bádogszív" ("Tin heart"). The track was later included on Bayer's first studio album Friderika, released on 8 June 1994.

== Eurovision Song Contest ==
Magyar Televízió, Hungary's public television organised the 1994 edition of Táncdalfesztivál, which served as the national selection show for the Eurovision Song Contest 1994. The final of the competition took place on 5 April. Bayer finished in first place and won the right to represent Hungary at Eurovision.

The Eurovision Song Contest took place at the Point Theatre in Dublin, Ireland, on 30 April 1994. At the contest, Bayer made her country's debut with "Kinek mondjam el vétkeimet?". She performed in 22nd place, preceded by Spain and followed by Russia. Hungary came in fourth position in a field of 25 with 122 points, which remains the country's best Eurosivion result.

== Reception ==
In May 1994, Friderika Bayer and Szilveszter Jenei were presented with a special eMeRTon Prize by Magyar Rádió, Hungary's public radio, for their achievement in the Eurovision Song Contest.

== Track listing ==
CD single
No.	Title	Lyrics	Music	Length
1.	"Kinek mondjam el vétkeimet"	Szilveszter Jenei	Szilveszter Jenei	3:24
2.	"Születésnap"	Szilveszter Jenei, Krisztina Bokor Fekete	Szilveszter Jenei	4:20
3.	"Bádogszív"	Szilveszter Jenei	Szilveszter Jenei	3:57
4.	"Who Wil Be There"	Szilveszter Jenei, Jamie Winchester	Szilveszter Jenei	3:24

== Covers and other versions ==
Ildikó Keresztes recorded a version of the song for her 2010 studio album Csak játszom. The track features guitar work from Jenei. In October 2017, singer Zorán Sztevanovity covered "Kinek mondjam el vétkeimet?" to promote the third and final season of the HBO series Terápia. The cover version, produced by Geri Kovács and Ádám Balázs, includes slightly modified lyrics to match the atmosphere of the series. An accompanying "mood video" was also released, featuring scenes from the series and footage of the song's recording.

In December 2014, a special tribute album was issued for the 20th anniversary of the song's original release and Hungary's Eurovision debut. It contains the original version sung by Bayer and nine covers by other performers, including Ildikó Keresztes, András Petruska, Péter Gerendás and the Cotton Club Singers.
