= Eurovision Song Contest 1994 =

International song competition

Date and venue
- Final: 30 April 1994
- Venue: Point Theatre; Dublin, Ireland

Organisation
- Organiser: European Broadcasting Union (EBU)
- Scrutineer: Christian Clausen

Production
- Host broadcaster: Radio Telefís Éireann (RTÉ)
- Director: Patrick Cowap
- Executive producer: Moya Doherty
- Musical director: Noel Kelehan
- Presenters: Cynthia Ní Mhurchú; Gerry Ryan

Participants
- Number of entries: 25
- Debuting countries: Estonia; Hungary; Lithuania; Poland; Romania; Russia; Slovakia
- Non-returning countries: Belgium; Denmark; Israel; Italy; Luxembourg; Slovenia; Turkey
- Participation map: Competing countries Relegated countries unable to participate due to poor results in previous contests Countries that participated in the past but not in 1994

Vote
- Voting system: Each country awarded 12, 10, 8-1 point(s) to their 10 favourite songs
- Winning song: Ireland "Rock 'n' Roll Kids"

The Eurovision Song Contest 1994 was the 39th edition of the Eurovision Song Contest, held on 30 April 1994 at the Point Theatre in Dublin, Ireland, and presented by Cynthia Ní Mhurchú and Gerry Ryan. It was organised by the European Broadcasting Union (EBU) and host broadcaster Radio Telefís Éireann (RTÉ), who staged the event after winning the 1993 contest for Ireland with the song "In Your Eyes" sung by Niamh Kavanagh and written by Jimmy Walsh. It was the first time that any country had hosted two successive editions of the contest, following the previous year's contest held in Millstreet.

Broadcasters from twenty-five countries participated in the contest, which for the first time featured a relegation system to reduce the number of interested participants. Seven new countries participated in the event, with entries from Estonia, Hungary, Lithuania, Poland, Romania, Russia and Slovakia featuring for the first time. However, Belgium, Denmark, Israel, Luxembourg, Slovenia and Turkey were unable to compete due to the new relegation rules as the lowest-scoring countries at the previous event, whereas Italy decided against participating by choice.

For the third time in a row, Ireland won the contest with the song "Rock 'n' Roll Kids", written by Brendan Graham and performed by Paul Harrington and Charlie McGettigan. Never before had a country won three times in a row in the history of the contest; at the same time, it was also a record sixth win, cementing Ireland as the country with the most wins in Eurovision history up till that point. Poland, Germany, Hungary, and Malta rounded out the top five positions, with Poland achieving the most successful result for a début entry in the contest's history.

The 1994 contest also featured the first appearance of Riverdance. Originally a seven-minute performance of traditional Irish and modern music, choral singing and Irish dancing featured as part of the contest's interval act, it was subsequently developed into a full stage show which has since become a worldwide phenomenon and catapulted the careers of its lead dancers Jean Butler and Michael Flatley.

== Location ==
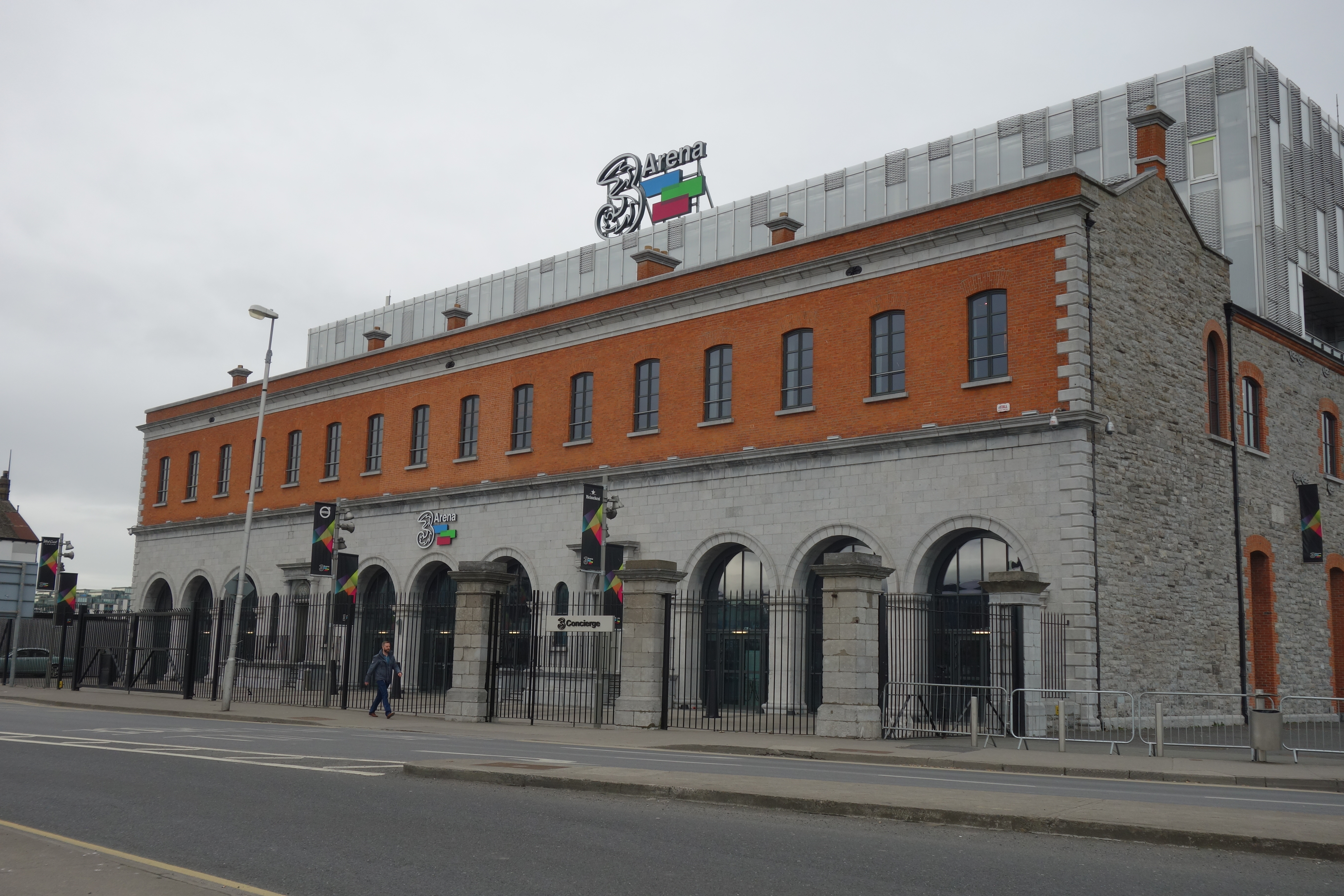
Point Theatre, Dublin – host venue of the 1994 contest (pictured following redevelopment)

The 1994 contest took place in Dublin, Ireland, following the country's victory at the 1993 edition with the song "In Your Eyes", performed by Niamh Kavanagh and written by Jimmy Walsh. It was the fifth time that Ireland had hosted the contest, following the 1971, 1981 and 1988 events also held in Dublin, and the previous year's event held in Millstreet. Ireland thus became the first country to host two successive contests.

The selected venue was the Point Theatre, a concert and events venue located among the Dublin Docklands and originally built as a train depot and warehouse to serve the nearby port. Opened as a music venue in 1988, it was closed for redevelopment and expansion in 2008 and is now known as the 3Arena. At the time of the contest, the arena could seat around 3,200 audience members.

== Participants ==
Eurovision Song Contest 1994 – Participation summaries by country
- Austria; Bosnia and Herzegovina; Croatia; Cyprus; Estonia; Finland; France; Germany; Greece; Hungary; Iceland; Ireland; Lithuania; Malta; Netherlands; Norway; Poland; Portugal; Romania; Russia; Slovakia; Spain; Sweden; Switzerland; United Kingdom

Twenty-five countries were permitted to participate in the contest. As the number of countries interested in participating in the contest grew, and following the use of a qualifying round in the previous year's event, a relegation system was introduced to the contest for the first time, which would prevent the lowest-scoring countries from the previous year's event from participating in the subsequent contest. In the summer of 1993 the European Broadcasting Union (EBU) confirmed that the seven lowest-scoring countries in the 1993 event would be barred from entering the 1994 contest, to make way for seven countries which would participate for the first time. As a result, Belgium, Cyprus, Denmark, Israel, Luxembourg, Slovenia, and Turkey were unable to enter the contest, and in the contest's largest single expansion of new participating countries since the first edition in 1956, Estonia, Hungary, Lithuania, Poland, Romania, Russia, and Slovakia made their début appearances. Estonia, Hungary, Romania and Slovakia had all previously participated in the 1993 qualifying round Kvalifikacija za Millstreet. Belgium thus failed to participate in the contest for the first time, leaving Germany and Switzerland as the only countries to have competed in every edition of the contest so far. Later in 1993 Italy's broadcaster RAI subsequently announced that it would not participate in the event, likely due to a lack of interest in the event among the Italian public and concerns within the broadcaster at the costs of staging the contest in the event that Italy won; this led to Cyprus being readmitted as the relegated country with the best result at the 1993 contest.

Four performers who had competed in previous editions of contests featured among the participating artists at this year's event: Marie Bergman, representing Sweden with Roger Pontare, had been a member of the group Family Four that had represented the country in the 1971 and 1972 contests; Cyprus's Evridiki made a second appearance in the contest, following her entry at the 1992 event; Sigga returned to the contest for Iceland for a third time, having previously competed as part of Stjórnin in 1990 and Heart 2 Heart in 1992; and Elisabeth Andreasson, competing in this event with Jan Werner Danielsen for Norway, also participated for the third time, having been a member of the group Chips, which represented Sweden in 1982, and Bobbysocks!, which had represented Norway and were the winners of the 1985 contest. A number of artists which had previously competed in the contest also returned as backing performers: Rhonda Heath, who was a member of the group Silver Convention that had represented Germany in the 1977 contest, performed as a backing singer for the German entry Mekado; and Eyjólfur Kristjánsson, who represented Iceland at the 1991 contest alongside Stefán Hilmarsson, returned as a backing singer for Sigga. Additionally, having supported Malta's William Mangion as backing performers in the previous year's event, Moira Stafrace and Christopher Scicluna returned to the Eurovision stage as the country's entrants at this year's contest.

Eurovision Song Contest 1994 participants
Country	Broadcaster	Artist	Song	Language	Songwriter(s)	Conductor
Austria	ORF	Petra Frey	"Für den Frieden der Welt"	German	Brunner & Brunner; Alfons Weindorf	Hermann Weindorf
Bosnia and Herzegovina	RTVBiH	Alma and Dejan	"Ostani kraj mene"	Bosnian	Adi Mulahalilović; Edo Mulahalilović	Sinan Alimanović
Croatia	HRT	Tony Cetinski	"Nek' ti bude ljubav sva"	Croatian	Željen Klašterka; Željko Krznarić	Miljenko Prohaska
Cyprus	CyBC	Evridiki	"Ime anthropos ki ego" (Είμαι άνθρωπος κι εγώ)	Greek	George Theofanous	George Theofanous
Estonia	ETV	Silvi Vrait	"Nagu merelaine"	Estonian	Ivar Must; Leelo Tungal	Urmas Lattikas
Finland	YLE	CatCat	"Bye Bye Baby"	Finnish	Markku "Make" Lentonen; Kari Salli	Olli Ahvenlahti
France	France Télévision	Nina Morato	"Je suis un vrai garçon"	French	Bruno Maman; Nina Morato	Alain Goraguer
Germany	MDR (Note: On behalf of the German public broadcasting consortium ARD)	Mekado	"Wir geben 'ne Party"	German	Bernd Meinunger; Ralph Siegel	Norbert Daum
Greece	ERT	Kostas Bigalis and the Sea Lovers	"To trehandiri (Diri Diri)" (Το τρεχαντήρι (Ντίρι Ντίρι))	Greek	Kostas Bigalis	Noel Kelehan
Hungary	MTV	Friderika	"Kinek mondjam el vétkeimet?"	Hungarian	Szilveszter Jenei	Péter Wolf
Iceland	RÚV	Sigga	"Nætur"	Icelandic	Friðrik Karlsson; Stefán Hilmarsson	Frank McNamara
Ireland	RTÉ	Paul Harrington and Charlie McGettigan	"Rock 'n' Roll Kids"	English	Brendan Graham	No conductor
Lithuania	LRT	Ovidijus Vyšniauskas	"Lopšinė mylimai"	Lithuanian	Ovidijus Vyšniauskas; Gintaras Zdebskis	Tomas Leiburas
Malta	PBS	Moira Stafrace and Christopher Scicluna	"More Than Love"	English	Christopher Scicluna; Moira Stafrace	Anthony Chircop
Netherlands	NOS	Willeke Alberti	"Waar is de zon"	Dutch	Coot van Doesburgh; Edwin Schimscheimer	Harry van Hoof
Norway	NRK	Elisabeth Andreasson and Jan Werner Danielsen	"Duett"	Norwegian	Rolf Løvland; Hans Olav Mørk	Pete Knutsen
Poland	TVP	Edyta Górniak	"To nie ja!"	Polish	Jacek Cygan; Stanisław Syrewicz	Noel Kelehan
Portugal	RTP	Sara	"Chamar a música"	Portuguese	Rosa Lobato de Faria; João Carlos Mota Oliveira	Thilo Krasmann
Romania	TVR	Dan Bittman	"Dincolo de nori"	Romanian	Dan Bittman; Antonio Furtuna	Noel Kelehan
Russia	RTR	Youddiph	"Vechny strannik" (Note: On-screen captions used the English title "Eternal Wanderer") (Вечный странник)	Russian	Piligrim; Lev Zemlinski	Lev Zemlinski
Slovakia	STV	Martin Ďurinda and Tublatanka	"Nekonečná pieseň"	Slovak	Martin Ďurinda; Martin Sarvaš	Vladimír Valovič
Spain	TVE	Alejandro Abad	"Ella no es ella"	Spanish	Alejandro Abad	Josep Llobell
Sweden	SVT	Marie Bergman and Roger Pontare	"Stjärnorna"	Swedish	Peter Bertilsson; Mikael Littwold	Anders Berglund
Switzerland	SRG SSR	Duilio	"Sto pregando"	Italian	Giuseppe Scaramella	Valeriano Chiaravalle
United Kingdom	BBC	Frances Ruffelle	"We Will Be Free (Lonely Symphony)"	English	George De Angelis; Mark Dean	Michael Reed

== Production and format ==
The Eurovision Song Contest 1994 was produced by the Irish public broadcaster Radio Telefís Éireann (RTÉ). Moya Doherty served as executive producer, Patrick Cowap served as director, Paula Farrell served as designer, and Noel Kelehan served as musical director, leading the RTÉ Concert Orchestra. A separate musical director could be nominated by each participating delegation to lead the orchestra during its country's performance, with the host musical director also available to conduct for those countries which did not nominate their own conductor. On behalf of the contest organisers, the European Broadcasting Union (EBU), the event was overseen by Christian Clausen as scrutineer.

Each participating broadcaster submitted one song, which was required to be no longer than three minutes in duration and performed in the language, or one of the languages, of the country which it represented. A maximum of six performers were allowed on stage during each country's performance, and all participants were required to have reached the age of 16 in the year of the contest. Each entry could utilise all or part of the live orchestra and could use instrumental-only backing tracks; however, any backing tracks used could only include the sound of instruments featured on stage being mimed by the performers.

Following the confirmation of the twenty-five competing countries, the draw to determine the running order was held on 16 November 1993 at the Point Theatre and was conducted by Niamh Kavanagh and Fionnuala Sweeney.

The results of the 1994 contest were determined through the same scoring system as had first been introduced in 1975: each country awarded twelve points to its favourite entry, followed by ten points to its second favourite, and then awarded points in decreasing value from eight to one for the remaining songs which featured in the country's top ten, with countries unable to vote for their own entry. The points awarded by each country were determined by an assembled jury of sixteen individuals, which was required to be split evenly between members of the public and music professionals, between men and women, and by age. Each jury member voted in secret and awarded between one and ten votes to each participating song, excluding that from their own country and with no abstentions permitted. The votes of each member were collected following the country's performance and then tallied by the non-voting jury chairperson to determine the points to be awarded. In any cases where two or more songs in the top ten received the same number of votes, a show of hands by all jury members was used to determine the final placing.

With the Point Theatre situated on the banks of the River Liffey, rivers were an integral part of the overall creative vision for the show and were a key theme of the opening and interval acts as well as the stage design. Paula Farrell's design, which was four times the size of the stage constructed for the Millstreet contest, provided a scene of a futuristic Dublin at night, featuring representations of skyscrapers which incorporated video screens and lighting effects and underfloor lighting representing the Liffey and Dublin Bay. On either side of the stage podium-lined platforms were used by the presenters in-between songs and during the voting segment.

Rehearsals at the contest venue began on 25 April 1994. Each participating delegation took part in two technical rehearsals in the week approaching the contest, with countries rehearsing in the order in which they would perform. In each country's first rehearsal, held on 25 and 26 April, the delegations were provided with a 15-minute stage-call to prepare the stage and to brief the orchestra, followed by a 25-minute rehearsal. This was then followed by an opportunity to review footage of the rehearsal on video screens and to conduct a 20-minute press conference. The second rehearsals on 27 and 28 April consisted of a 10-minute stage-call and a 20-minute rehearsal. Three dress rehearsals were held with all artists, two in the afternoon and evening of 29 April and one final rehearsal in the afternoon of 30 April, with an audience present at the evening rehearsal on 29 April. The competing delegations were additionally invited to a welcome reception during the week of the event, held on the evening of 25 April in the Dining Hall of Trinity College Dublin.

During the final dress rehearsal on 30 April, the Polish entrant Edyta Górniak performed the second half of her song "To nie ja!" in English. As this rehearsal was also heard by the juries this constituted a break of the contest rules. Although discussions were held on whether to sanction or disqualify the country, Poland was ultimately allowed to compete.

== Contest overview ==
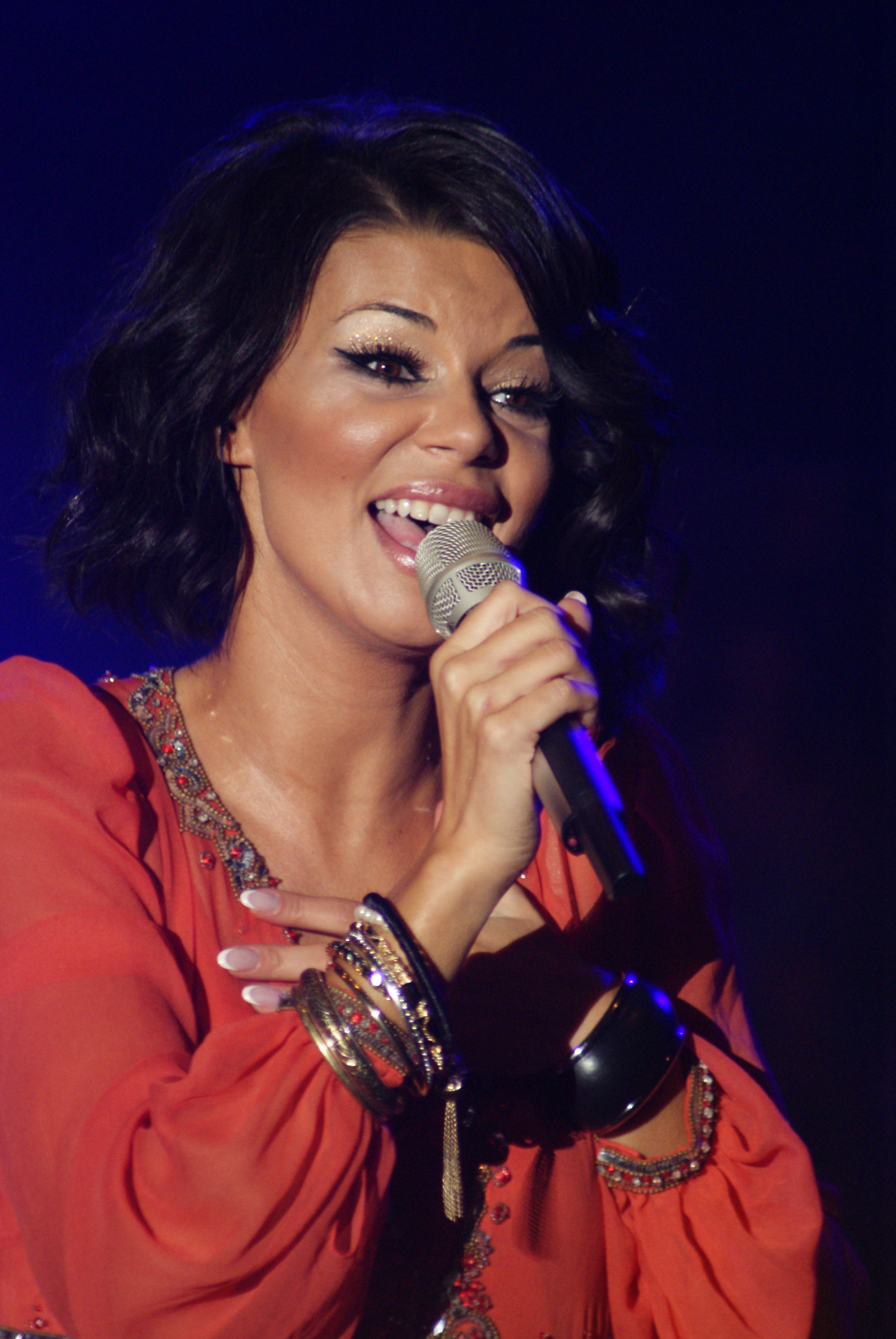
Edyta Górniak (pictured in 2009), the first artist to represent Poland in Eurovision, finished in second place, Poland's highest position to date.

The contest took place on 30 April 1994 at 20:00 (IST) and lasted 3 hours and 3 minutes. The show was presented by the Irish journalist and television presenter Cynthia Ní Mhurchú and the Irish radio and television presenter Gerry Ryan. Ní Mhurchú and Ryan had been considered as hosts for the 1993 event before the eventual choice of Fionnuala Sweeney.

The contest was opened with a segment by the Galway-based arts and theatre company Macnas, featuring a mixture of pre-recorded and live footage of a replica Viking longship on the river Liffey, and dancers, flag-bearers and performers in caricature masks of notable Irish personalities in various locations in central Dublin and in the Point Theatre. The interval act, "Riverdance", was a seven-minute composition by the Irish composer Bill Whelan, and took inspiration from "Timedance", the interval act from the 1981 contest also held in Dublin. "Riverdance" featured a mix of traditional Irish and modern music by the RTÉ Concert Orchestra, choral singing from the Celtic ensemble Anúna, and Irish dancing led by the Irish-American dancers Jean Butler and Michael Flatley. The trophy awarded to the winners, entitled "Wavelength", was designed by the Irish sculptor Grace Weir of the Temple Bar Gallery, and was presented by the previous year's winning artist Niamh Kavanagh.

The winner was Ireland represented by the song "Rock 'n' Roll Kids", written by Brendan Graham and performed by Paul Harrington and Charlie McGettigan. This marked Ireland's sixth contest win – a new contest record – and also gave the country its third win in a row – the first time a country had won three successive contests. "Rock 'n' Roll Kids" became the highest scoring winner in Eurovision history to date with 226 points, and was the first song to receive over 200 points. It was also the first time that a song had won without using the orchestra. Harrington and McGettigan additionally became the oldest winning performers and the first winning male duo. First-time participating countries Poland, Hungary and Russia all finished in the top ten, placing second, fourth and ninth respectively, while conversely the four other débuting countries all placed within the bottom seven entries, with Lithuania scoring nul points with its first ever entry. Poland achieved the most successful début performance of any country in the contest's history at the time, and its second-place finish in this event remains as of 2026 the country's best ever Eurovision placing.

Results of the Eurovision Song Contest 1994
R/O	Country	Artist	Song	Points	Place
1	Sweden	Marie Bergman and Roger Pontare	"Stjärnorna"	48	13
2	Finland	CatCat	"Bye Bye Baby"	11	22
3	Ireland	Paul Harrington and Charlie McGettigan	"Rock 'n' Roll Kids"	226	1
4	Cyprus	Evridiki	"Ime anthropos ki ego"	51	11
5	Iceland	Sigga	"Nætur"	49	12
6	United Kingdom	Frances Ruffelle	"We Will Be Free (Lonely Symphony)"	63	10
7	Croatia	Tony Cetinski	"Nek' ti bude ljubav sva"	27	16
8	Portugal	Sara	"Chamar a música"	73	8
9	Switzerland	Duilio	"Sto pregando"	15	19
10	Estonia	Silvi Vrait	"Nagu merelaine"	2	24
11	Romania	Dan Bittman	"Dincolo de nori"	14	21
12	Malta	Moira Stafrace and Christopher Scicluna	"More than Love"	97	5
13	Netherlands	Willeke Alberti	"Waar is de zon"	4	23
14	Germany	Mekado	"Wir geben 'ne Party"	128	3
15	Slovakia	Martin Ďurinda and Tublatanka	"Nekonečná pieseň"	15	19
16	Lithuania	Ovidijus Vyšniauskas	"Lopšinė mylimai"	0	25
17	Norway	Elisabeth Andreasson and Jan Werner Danielsen	"Duett"	76	6
18	Bosnia and Herzegovina	Alma and Dejan	"Ostani kraj mene"	39	15
19	Greece	Kostas Bigalis and the Sea Lovers	"To trehandiri (Diri Diri)"	44	14
20	Austria	Petra Frey	"Für den Frieden der Welt"	19	17
21	Spain	Alejandro Abad	"Ella no es ella"	17	18
22	Hungary	Friderika	"Kinek mondjam el vétkeimet?"	122	4
23	Russia	Youddiph	"Vechny strannik"	70	9
24	Poland	Edyta Górniak	"To nie ja!"	166	2
25	France	Nina Morato	"Je suis un vrai garçon"	74	7

=== Spokespersons ===
Each participating broadcaster appointed a spokesperson who was responsible for announcing, in English or French, the votes for its respective country. For the first time, the spokespersons were connected to the venue via satellite rather than through telephone lines, allowing them to appear in vision during the broadcast. Spokespersons at the 1994 contest are listed below.

1. Sweden – Marianne Anderberg
2. Finland – Solveig Herlin
3. Ireland – Eileen Dunne
4. Cyprus – Anna Partelidou
5. Iceland – Sigríður Arnardóttir
6. United Kingdom – Colin Berry
7. Croatia – Helga Vlahović
8. Portugal – Isabel Bahia
9. Switzerland – Sandra Studer
10. Estonia – Urve Tiidus
11. Romania – Cristina Țopescu
12. Malta – John Demanuele
13. Netherlands – Joop van Os
14. Germany – Carmen Nebel
15. Slovakia – Juraj Čurný
16. Lithuania – Gitana Lapinskaitė
17. Norway – Sverre Christophersen
18. Bosnia and Herzegovina – Diana Grković-Foretić
19. Greece – Fotini Giannoulatou
20. Austria – Tilia Herold
21. Spain – María Ángeles Balañac
22. Hungary – Iván Bradányi
23. Russia – Irina Klenskaya
24. Poland – Jan Chojnacki
25. France – Laurent Romejko

== Detailed voting results ==
Jury voting was used to determine the points awarded by all countries. The announcement of the results from each country was conducted in the order in which they performed, with the spokespersons announcing their country's points in English or French in ascending order. The detailed breakdown of the points awarded by each country is listed in the tables below.

Detailed voting results of the Eurovision Song Contest 1994
		Total score	Sweden	Finland	Ireland	Cyprus	Iceland	United Kingdom	Croatia	Portugal	Switzerland	Estonia	Romania	Malta	Netherlands	Germany	Slovakia	Lithuania	Norway	Bosnia and Herzegovina	Greece	Austria	Spain	Hungary	Russia	Poland	France
Contestants	Sweden	48					2				7	2		3	6	5		5	10			5	1	2			
Contestants	Finland	11																		1	10						
Contestants	Ireland	**226**	10	7		8	**12**	10	**12**	**12**	**12**	10	8	5	**12**	**12**	6	10	**12**	10		10	10	10	**12**	8	8
Contestants	Cyprus	51		10			3			5	2								5		**12**		4		2	5	3
Contestants	Iceland	49	8	1	6			6		3	3						1	3				3	6		1	4	4
Contestants	United Kingdom	63			1	5			6	8	8	5			2	4	3		2	4		1	3	3	5	3	
Contestants	Croatia	27												10			**12**				5						
Contestants	Portugal	73	5	5	8		8	8			5			1	3								**12**	7	4	1	6
Contestants	Switzerland	15												8									2				5
Contestants	Estonia	2																			2						
Contestants	Romania	14												6				2			6						
Contestants	Malta	97	4	6	10	2		1	7	4	6	7	10		1	3	10	7		**12**	7						
Contestants	Netherlands	4																				4					
Contestants	Germany	128	6	3	5	6	7	7	10	10		3	**12**		4		7	4	1	7		2	8	**12**	7	7	
Contestants	Slovakia	15												**12**							3						
Contestants	Lithuania	0																									
Contestants	Norway	76	7		3	10	1	4	3		1	8	4		7	2		1		6	1		5	5	8		
Contestants	Bosnia and Herzegovina	39		2					4					7			8						7	1			10
Contestants	Greece	44	2	4		**12**							6	4		1	5		4					4		2	
Contestants	Austria	19	1			7		3	2				1							5							
Contestants	Spain	17											5				2				8						2
Contestants	Hungary	122	**12**	**12**	**12**		10	2	5	1	4	4	2		10	7			8	3		8			3	**12**	7
Contestants	Russia	70			4	3	4	5	1	2		1	3		5	6		6	3		4	6		6		10	1
Contestants	Poland	166		8	7	1	6	**12**	8	7	10	**12**	7	2	8	10	4	**12**	6	8		**12**		8	6		**12**
Contestants	France	74	3		2	4	5			6		6				8		8	7	2		7			10	6	

=== 12 points ===
The below table summarises how the maximum 12 points were awarded from one country to another. The winning country is shown in bold. Ireland received the maximum score of 12 points from eight of the voting countries, with Poland receiving five sets of 12 points, Hungary receiving four sets, Germany two sets, and Croatia, Cyprus, Malta, Portugal and Slovakia each receiving one maximum score.

Distribution of 12 points awarded at the Eurovision Song Contest 1994
N.	Contestant	Nation(s) giving 12 points
8	**Ireland**	Croatia, Germany, Iceland, Netherlands, Norway, Portugal, Russia, Switzerland
5	Poland	Austria, Estonia, France, Lithuania, United Kingdom
4	Hungary	Ireland, Finland, Poland, Sweden
2	Germany	Hungary, Romania
1	Croatia	Slovakia
1	Cyprus	Greece
1	Greece	Cyprus
1	Malta	Bosnia and Herzegovina
1	Portugal	Spain
1	Slovakia	Malta

== Broadcasts ==
Each participating broadcaster was required to relay the contest via its networks. Non-participating EBU member broadcasters were also able to relay the contest as "passive participants". Broadcasters were able to send commentators to provide coverage of the contest in their own native language and to relay information about the artists and songs to their television viewers. These commentators were typically sent to the venue to report on the event, and were able to provide commentary from small booths constructed at the back of the venue. Known details on the broadcasts in each country, including the specific broadcasting stations and commentators are shown in the tables below.

Broadcasters and commentators in participating countries
Country	Broadcaster	Channel(s)	Commentator(s)	Ref.
Austria	ORF	ORF 1	Ernst Grissemann	
Croatia	HRT	HRT 1	Aleksandar Kostadinov	
Cyprus	CyBC	RIK 2, Trito Programma		
Estonia	ETV		Vello Rand	
Estonia	STV	STV1		
Finland	YLE	TV1	Erkki Pohjanheimo and Kirsi-Maria Niemi	
Finland	YLE	Riksradion		
France	France Télévision	France 2	Patrice Laffont	
Germany	ARD	Erstes Deutsches Fernsehen	Jan Hofer	
Hungary	MTV	MTV2	István Vágó	
Iceland	RÚV	Sjónvarpið, Rás 2	Jakob Frímann Magnússon	
Ireland	RTÉ	RTÉ 1	Pat Kenny	
Ireland	RTÉ	RTÉ Radio 1	Larry Gogan	
Lithuania	LRT	LTV		
Malta	PBS	TVM		
Netherlands	NOS	Nederland 3	Willem van Beusekom	
Norway	NRK	NRK Fjernsynet, NRK P1	Jostein Pedersen	
Poland	TVP	TVP1	Artur Orzech	
Portugal	RTP	RTP Canal 1	Eládio Clímaco	
Romania	TVR	TVR 1 (Note: The broadcast was temporarily moved to TVR 2 due to a live broadcast celebrating the Resurrection of Jesus at 23:50 (EEST); it was later restored to TVR 1 at 01:00 (EEST).)	Gabriela Cristea	
Russia	RTR	RTR (Note: Also broadcast deferred via the Orbita satellite broadcasting system in the Russian Far East)	Sergey Antipov	
Slovakia	STV	STV2		
Spain	TVE	La Primera	José Luis Uribarri	
Sweden	SVT	Kanal 1	Pekka Heino	
Sweden	SR	SR P3, SR P4	Claes-Johan Larsson and Lisa Syrén	
Switzerland	SRG SSR	SF DRS	Bernard Thurnheer	
Switzerland	SRG SSR	TSR Chaîne nationale	Jean-Marc Richard	
Switzerland	SRG SSR	TSI Canale nazionale		
United Kingdom	BBC	BBC1 (Note: Additional live broadcast on BBC World Service Television)	Terry Wogan	
United Kingdom	BBC	BBC Radio 2	Ken Bruce	

Broadcasters and commentators in non-participating countries
Country	Broadcaster	Channel(s)	Commentator(s)	Ref.
Australia	SBS	SBS TV (Note: Deferred broadcast the following day at 20:30 (AEST))		
Belgium	BRTN	TV2	André Vermeulen	
Belgium	BRTN	Radio 2	Marc Brillouet and Julien Put	
Belgium	RTBF	RTBF1	Jean-Pierre Hautier	
Denmark	DR	DR TV	Jørgen de Mylius	
Faroe Islands	SvF			
Greenland	KNR	KNR (Note: Deferred broadcast at 21:20 (WGST))		
Israel	IBA	Channel 1		
Jordan	JRTV	JTV2		
Slovenia	RTVSLO	SLO 1	Damjana Golavšek	
Slovenia	RTVSLO	Val 202		
South Korea	KBS	KBS2 (Note: Delayed broadcast on 28 May 1994 at 15:15 (KST))		
Turkey	TRT	TRT 1		
Yugoslavia	RTS	RTS 3K		

== Legacy ==
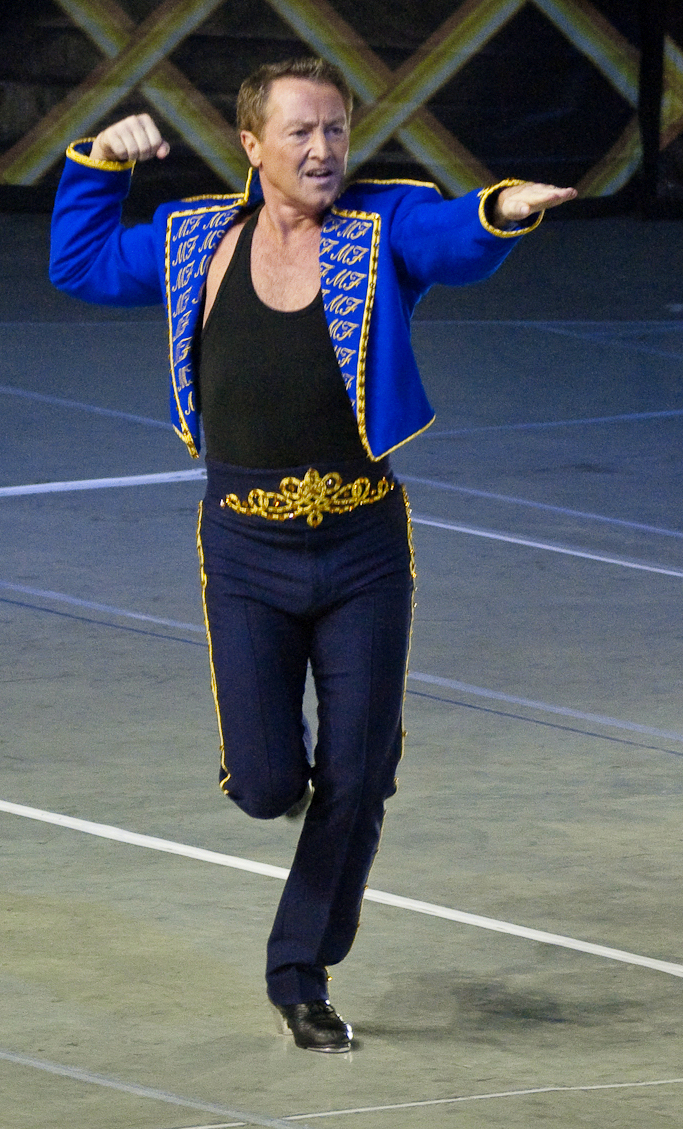
Michael Flatley featured as part of the contest's interval act "Riverdance", which was subsequently developed into a stage show that toured worldwide.

Although the winning song had modest success, peaking in the Irish Singles Chart at number two and also entering the Dutch and Flemish charts following the contest, it was largely overshadowed by the contest's interval act. The music to "Riverdance" was subsequently released as a single shortly after the contest and shot straight to number 1 on the Irish charts where it remained for 18 weeks. As of 2023, "Riverdance" remains the second best selling single in Ireland ever, behind Elton John's "Something About the Way You Look Tonight"/"Candle in the Wind 1997". An invite was subsequently given to feature the original seven-minute performance at the Royal Variety Performance in November 1994 at the Dominion Theatre in London, in the presence of then-Prince Charles. At the same time, preparations were underway to develop the seven-minute performance into a stage show, led by Moya Doherty, who had been the executive producer of Eurovision 1994, and her husband John McColgan. Opening in February 1995 at the Point Theatre and featuring original lead dancers Michael Flatley and Jean Butler, the full-length show ran for an initial run of five weeks, with tickets selling out within three days of going on sale, followed by another sold-out run at the Hammersmith Apollo in London, and in March 1996 came its first performance in the United States, at the Radio City Music Hall in New York City. It is estimated that Riverdance has been seen live by over 27.5 million people at performances worldwide, and that over ten million home video copies of Riverdance have been sold.

The relegation system introduced to the contest in this edition continued to be used in various forms for the next ten years and allowed even more new countries to join the event, with Macedonia, Latvia and Ukraine competing for the first time in 1998, 2000 and 2003 respectively. However, as the contest continued to develop, and as even more countries began to express an interest in competing, the relegation system proved unable to meet the needs required to allow for an equitable solution for all countries. Ultimately this led to the introduction of a semi-final to the contest format in 2004, allowing all interested countries to participate once again, which was eventually expanded to two semi-finals from 2008.

== Notes and references ==
=== Bibliography ===
- Knox, David Blake (2015). Ireland and the Eurovision: The Winners, the Losers and the Turkey. Stillorgan, Dublin, Ireland: New Island Books. ISBN 978-1-84840-429-8.
- Murtomäki, Asko (2007). Finland 12 points! Suomen Euroviisut (in Finnish). Helsinki, Finland: Teos. ISBN 951-851-106-3.
- O'Connor, John Kennedy (2010). The Eurovision Song Contest: The Official History (2nd ed.). London, United Kingdom: Carlton Books. ISBN 978-1-84732-521-1.
- Roxburgh, Gordon (2020). Songs for Europe: The United Kingdom at the Eurovision Song Contest. Vol. Four: The 1990s. Prestatyn, United Kingdom: Telos Publishing. ISBN 978-1-84583-163-9.
- Thorsson, Leif; Verhage, Martin (2006). Melodifestivalen genom tiderna : de svenska uttagningarna och internationella finalerna [Melodifestivalen through the ages: the Swedish selections and international finals] (in Swedish). Stockholm, Sweden: Premium Publishing. ISBN 91-89136-29-2.
