= Sweden in the Eurovision Song Contest 1994 =

- Eurovision Song Contest 1994
- Participating broadcaster: Sveriges Television (SVT)
- Country: Sweden
- Selection process: Melodifestivalen 1994
- Selection date: 12 March 1994

Competing entry
- Song: "Stjärnorna"
- Artist: Marie Bergman and Roger Pontare
- Songwriters: Peter Bertilsson; Mikael Littwold

Placement
- Final result: 13th, 48 points

Participation chronology

Sweden was represented at the Eurovision Song Contest 1994 with the song "Stjärnorna", composed by Peter Bertilsson, with lyrics by Mikael Littwold, and performed by Marie Bergman and Roger Pontare. The Swedish participating broadcaster, Sveriges Television (SVT), selected its entry through Melodifestivalen 1994.

== Before Eurovision ==
=== Melodifestivalen 1994 ===
Melodifestivalen 1994 was the selection for the 34th song to represent Sweden at the Eurovision Song Contest. It was the 33rd time that this system of picking a song had been used. 1,560 songs were submitted to Sveriges Television (SVT) for the competition. The final was held in the SVT Studios in Stockholm on 12 March 1994, presented by Kattis Ahlström and Sven Melander and was broadcast on TV1 and Sveriges Radio's P3 and P4 networks. The show was watched by 3,780,000 people.

First Round – 12 March 1994
R/O	Artist	Song	Songwriter(s)	Result
1	Tina Röklander	"Kom och dela min hemlighet"	Per Andréasson, Anders Dannvik	Advanced
2	Nick Borgen	"Små minnen av dig"	Pierre Breidensjö, Jörgen Johansson	Advanced
3	Perikles	"Vill du resa til månen med mig"	Bosse Nilsson	—N/a
4	Gladys del Pilar	"Det vackraste jag vet"	Ingela 'Pling' Forsman, Michael Saxell	Advanced
5	Tiffany	"Håll om mig ikväll"	Tommy Kaså, Anica Olson	—N/a
6	Marie Bergman and Roger Pontare	"Stjärnorna"	Mikael Littvold, Peter Bertilsson	Advanced
7	Carina and Michael Jaarnek	"Det är aldrig för sent"	Kjell-Åke Norén, Christer Johansson	—N/a
8	Jonny Lindé	"Jag stannar hos dig"	Stephan Berg	—N/a
9	Jan Höglund	"Kärlekens vind"	Arne Höglund	—N/a
10	Cayenne	"Stanna hos mig"	Lilling Palmeklint	Advanced

Second Round – 12 March 1994
R/O	Artist	Song	Points	Place
1	Tina Röklander	"Kom och dela min hemlighet"	21	4
2	Nick Borgen	"Små minnen av dig"	21	4
3	Gladys del Pilar	"Det vackraste jag vet"	62	2
4	Marie Bergman and Roger Pontare	"Stjärnorna"	66	1
5	Cayenne	"Stanna hos mig"	61	3

Detailed Regional Jury Voting
R/O	Song	Luleå	Umeå	Sundsvall	Falun	Örebro	Karlstad	Gothenburg	Malmö	Växjö	Norrköping	Stockholm	Total
1	"Kom och dela min hemlighet"	2	1	4	2	1	2	1	2	2	2	2	21
2	"Små minnen av dig"	1	2	8	1	2	1	2	1	1	1	1	21
3	"Det vackraste jag vet"	6	4	2	8	6	6	4	8	4	6	8	62
4	"Stjärnorna"	8	6	6	6	4	8	8	4	8	4	4	66
5	"Stanna hos mig"	4	8	1	4	8	4	6	6	6	8	6	61

== At Eurovision ==
Bergman and Pontare opened the contest, singing 1st of 25 countries, preceding Finland. At the close of the voting they had received 48 points, placing 13th.

The contest was broadcast on Kanal 1 (with commentary by Pekka Heino) and on radio stations SR P3 and SR P4 (both with commentary by Claes-Johan Larsson and Lisa Syrén).

=== Voting ===
Points awarded to Sweden
Score	Country
12 points	
10 points	Norway
8 points	
7 points	Switzerland
6 points	Netherlands
5 points	Austria; Germany; Lithuania
4 points	
3 points	Malta
2 points	Estonia; Hungary; Iceland
1 point	Spain

Points awarded by Sweden
Score	Country
12 points	Hungary
10 points	Ireland
8 points	Iceland
7 points	Norway
6 points	Germany
5 points	Portugal
4 points	Malta
3 points	France
2 points	Greece
1 point	Austria
