= United Kingdom in the Eurovision Song Contest 1994 =

- Eurovision Song Contest 1994
- Participating broadcaster: British Broadcasting Corporation (BBC)
- Country: United Kingdom
- Selection process: Artist: Internal selection Song: A Song for Europe 1994
- Selection date: 18 March 1994

Competing entry
- Song: "Lonely Symphony (We Will Be Free)"
- Artist: Frances Ruffelle
- Songwriters: George De Angelis; Mark Dean

Placement
- Final result: 10th, 63 points

Participation chronology

The United Kingdom was represented at the Eurovision Song Contest 1994 with the song "Lonely Symphony (We Will Be Free)", written by George De Angelis and Mark Dean, and performed by Frances Ruffelle. The British participating broadcaster, the British Broadcasting Corporation (BBC), selected its entry through a national final, after having previously selected the performer internally.

== Before Eurovision ==
=== Artist selection ===
The British Broadcasting Corporation (BBC) revealed Frances Ruffelle as its representative for the Eurovision Song Contest 1994.

=== A Song for Europe 1994 ===
Two songs each, both performed by Frances Ruffelle, were premiered during four preview programmes on BBC1 between 5 and 12 March 1994. Eight songs competed in the televised final on 18 March 1994 held at the BBC Television Centre in London and hosted by Terry Wogan following a similar format of the past two years. The show was broadcast on BBC1 and BBC Radio 2 with commentary by Ken Bruce.

A panel consisting of Richard O'Brien and Jonathan King provided feedback regarding the songs during the show.

A public televote selected the winning song, "Lonely Symphony", which was revealed during a separate show broadcast on BBC1 and hosted by Terry Wogan.

A Song for Europe 1994 – 18 March 1994
R/O	Song	Songwriter(s)	Televote	Place
1	"Waiting in the Wings"	Tony Moore	36,856	3
2	"Slowboat"	Rupert Wates	6,549	7
3	"I Know These Things"	Helen Turner, Shirley Kemp	6,269	8
4	"Sink or Swim"	Linzi Morgan, David Harris, Paul Fishman	63,417	2
5	"Wrong Guy"	Rick Taylor	7,406	6
6	"One More Night"	Paul Boross, Mark Holding	20,608	4
7	"His Love"	Anthony Clarke, Pam Sheyne	8,031	5
8	"Lonely Symphony"	George De Angelis, Mark Dean	99,946	1

== At Eurovision ==
Ruffelle performed 6th on the night, after Iceland and before Croatia. She picked up 63 points, finishing 10th. The UK jury awarded 12 points to runner up Poland.

The contest was broadcast on BBC1, BBC World Service Television (both with commentary by Terry Wogan) and on radio station BBC Radio 2 (with commentary by Ken Bruce).

=== Voting ===
Points awarded to the United Kingdom
Score	Country
12 points	
10 points	
8 points	Portugal; Switzerland
7 points	
6 points	Croatia
5 points	Cyprus; Estonia; Russia
4 points	Bosnia and Herzegovina; Germany
3 points	Hungary; Poland; Slovakia; Spain
2 points	Netherlands; Norway
1 point	Austria; Ireland

Points awarded by the United Kingdom
Score	Country
12 points	Poland
10 points	Ireland
8 points	Portugal
7 points	Germany
6 points	Iceland
5 points	Russia
4 points	Norway
3 points	Austria
2 points	Hungary
1 point	Malta
