= Norway in the Eurovision Song Contest 1994 =

- Eurovision Song Contest 1994
- Participating broadcaster: Norsk rikskringkasting (NRK)
- Country: Norway
- Selection process: Melodi Grand Prix 1994
- Selection date: 26 March 1994

Competing entry
- Song: "Duett"
- Artist: Elisabeth Andreasson and Jan Werner Danielsen
- Songwriters: Rolf Løvland; Hans Olav Mørk

Placement
- Final result: 6th, 76 points

Participation chronology

Norway was represented at the Eurovision Song Contest 1994 with the song "Duett", composed by Rolf Løvland, with lyrics by Hans Olav Mørk, and performed by Elisabeth Andreasson and Jan Werner Danielsen. The Norwegian participating broadcaster, Norsk rikskringkasting (NRK), selected its entry through the Melodi Grand Prix 1994. This was the third of four Eurovision appearances by Andreasson.

== Before Eurovision ==
=== Melodi Grand Prix 1994 ===
Norsk rikskringkasting (NRK) held the national final on 26 March 1994 at the Oslo Spektrum, hosted by Tande-P. Ten songs took part with the winner being chosen by a voting from six regional juries. Another set of jury votes were included, which came from the votes cast by the public via Norsk Tipping. Other participants included three-time Norwegian representative and MGP regular Jahn Teigen and Tor Endresen, who would represent Norway in 1997.

Final – 26 March 1994
R/O	Artist	Song	Songwriter(s)	Jury	Norsk Tipping	Total	Place
1	Karoline Gregersen	"Tunge dråper"	Bottolf Lødemel, Stig Gjendem, Hans Henrik Sørensen	186	1	187	7
2	Madam Medusa	"Casanova"	Per Berge Johannessen, Cathrine Borkenhagen, Eva Jansen	284	3	287	4
3	Jahn Teigen	"Gi alt vi har"	Geir Rønning	271	4	275	5
4	Elin Furubotn	"Mor"	Lina Holt	48	1	49	10
5	After Eight	"Ensom natt"	Per Fredrik Kjølner, Astor Andersen	197	3	200	6
6	Tor Endresen	"Aladdin"	Tor Endresen	428	7	435	2
7	Yellow Pages	"Slør"	Giert Clausen, Hallgrim Bratberg	123	1	124	9
8	Laila Nordhaug and Morten Eriksen	"Gi meg ett tegn"	Are Selheim, Øyvind Boska	321	2	323	3
9	SubDiva	"Uimotståelig"	Svein Edvardsen, Dag Øistein Endsjø	133	1	134	8
10	Elisabeth Andreasson and Jan Werner Danielsen	"Duett"	Rolf Løvland, Hans Olav Mørk	499	77	576	1

Regional Jury voting results
R/O	Song	Tromsø	Kristiansand	Påskefjellet	Bergen	Trondheim	Oslo Spektrum	Total
1	"Tunge dråper"	23	5	35	59	33	31	186
2	"Casanova"	40	59	54	53	42	36	284
3	"Gi alt vi har"	32	53	40	34	34	78	271
4	"Mor"	9	9	10	7	4	9	48
5	"Ensom natt"	42	32	21	27	35	40	197
6	"Aladdin"	70	75	76	76	45	86	428
7	"Slør"	30	13	22	34	6	18	123
8	"Gi meg ett tegn"	46	75	69	34	43	54	321
9	"Uimotståelig"	30	9	14	47	11	22	133
10	"Duett"	77	92	93	76	81	80	499

== At Eurovision ==
On the night of the final Andreasson and Danielsen performed 17th in the running order, following Lithuania and preceding Bosnia and Herzegovina. The song was a traditional Eurovision-style ballad in a contest very heavily dominated by downtempo entries. At the close of voting "Duett" had received 76 points, placing Norway 6th of the 25 entries. The Norwegian jury awarded its 12 points to contest winners Ireland.

The contest was broadcast on NRK Fjernsynet and on radio station NRK P1, both with commentary by Jostein Pedersen.

=== Voting ===
Points awarded to Norway
Score	Country
12 points	
10 points	Cyprus
8 points	Estonia; Russia
7 points	Netherlands; Sweden
6 points	Bosnia and Herzegovina
5 points	Hungary; Spain
4 points	Romania; United Kingdom
3 points	Croatia; Ireland
2 points	Germany
1 point	Greece; Iceland; Lithuania; Switzerland

Points awarded by Norway
Score	Country
12 points	Ireland
10 points	Sweden
8 points	Hungary
7 points	France
6 points	Poland
5 points	Cyprus
4 points	Greece
3 points	Russia
2 points	United Kingdom
1 point	Germany
