= Switzerland in the Eurovision Song Contest 1994 =

- Eurovision Song Contest 1994
- Participating broadcaster: Swiss Broadcasting Corporation (SRG SSR)
- Country: Switzerland
- Selection process: Internal selection
- Announcement date: 11 January 1994

Competing entry
- Song: "Sto pregando"
- Artist: Duilio
- Songwriter: Giuseppe Scaramella

Placement
- Final result: 19th, 15 points

Participation chronology

Switzerland was represented at the Eurovision Song Contest 1994 by the song "Sto pregando", written by Giuseppe Scaramella, and performed by Duilio. The Swiss participating broadcaster, the Swiss Broadcasting Corporation (SRG SSR), internally selected its entry for the contest.

== Before Eurovision ==
=== Internal selection ===
Unlike several years prior, the Swiss Broadcasting Corporation (SRG SSR) held an internal selection on 8 January, the first time since 1980. According to DRS editor-in-chief Toni Wachter, this was due to the low publicity and high expenses on their national finals.

Sixteen jurors were present, which were split under four different age groups. The voting process of the internal selection was reportedly the same as the televised national finals; three regional votes (represented by half of the jurors) and a press and expert vote (represented by the other half). The details regarding the submissions and shortlisted songs are unknown.

On 11 January, it was announced that the song "Sto pregando", written by Giuseppe Scaramella and sung by Duilio was selected.

== At Eurovision ==
At the Eurovision Song Contest 1994, held at the Point Theatre in Dublin, the Swiss entry was the ninth entry of the night following Portugal and preceding Estonia. The Swiss conductor at the contest was Valeriano Chiaravalle. At the close of voting, Switzerland had received 15 points in total; finishing in nineteenth place out of twenty-five countries. Due to the poor result, Switzerland was relegated in the 1995 contest, marking their first absence in the contest.

The contest was broadcast on SF DRS (with commentary by Bernard Thurnheer), TSR Chaîne nationale (with commentary by Jean-Marc Richard) and on TSI Canale nazionale.

=== Voting ===
Points awarded to Switzerland
Score	Country
12 points	
10 points	
8 points	Malta
7 points	
6 points	
5 points	France
4 points	
3 points	
2 points	Spain
1 point	

Points awarded by Switzerland
Score	Country
12 points	Ireland
10 points	Poland
8 points	United Kingdom
7 points	Sweden
6 points	Malta
5 points	Portugal
4 points	Hungary
3 points	Iceland
2 points	Cyprus
1 point	Norway
