= Friderika Bayer =

Hungarian singer

- Born: 4 October 1971 (age 54); Budapest, Hungary
- Genres: Pop; gospel
- Occupation: Singer
- Years active: 1994–present

Friderika Bayer (born 4 October 1971), is a Hungarian singer. She is best known for representing Hungary at the Eurovision Song Contest 1994 with the song "Kinek mondjam el vétkeimet?", placing fourth. This remains Hungary's best-ever result in the contest.

== Early career ==
In 1994 she won the Song Contest called by the Hungarian Television. The title of her winning song was: "Kinek mondjam el vétkeimet?" ("To whom can I tell my sins?"). Later that year, she represented Hungary in the Eurovision Song Contest 1994, staged in Dublin. This was the first time that Hungary, along with several other eastern European countries, participated in the contest. She finished in 4th place with 122 points, which is, as of 2026, still the best result Hungary has ever achieved at the competition. Her first album came out on CD and cassette on 30 April 1994. It became a gold album in less than two months.

She was awarded the EMERTON prize by the Hungarian Radio honouring her success at the Eurovision Song Contest, and according to the votes of the music business as well as the public, in 1994 she was awarded the Golden Deer prize as Popsinger of the Year. This prize was created by Axel Springer Publications. The same year she was also billed Female Popsinger of the Year by the readers of Youth Magazine. On 25 January 1995, broadcast by TV and radio, she received the EMERTON prize (now for the second time) this time as Newcomer of the Year. In addition to this she was given the Golden Giraffe prize, created by Mahasz, in the same category.

In August 1995 she won second place at the 32nd Sopot Festival in Poland, and performed on the same stage with Annie Lennox and Chuck Berry in the Grand Finale. She became a member of the Faith Church in 1996, along with her husband, and since then they have regularly been attending the services of the Church in Budapest.

In 1998, the first single "Feltárcsáztad a szívemet" ("You dialled my heart") of her third album became the most often played radio-hit in Hungary.

== Later career ==
Since December 2001 she can be seen on the Hungarian ATV in the "Vidám Vasárnap" ("Happy Sunday") program, where she sings in the band of Faith Church every Sunday from 11 o'clock.

Her two gospel albums are performed in a traditional but nonetheless classic style and phrasing. She authored songs on her last gospel album. In Hungary she is considered, nowadays, as one of the most important female pop artists of her generation. In addition, she has contributed in the 1990s to the renewal of Hungarian pop music, which, after all, was also in line with the country's cultural integration into Europe.

== Discography ==
- Friderika (1994)
- Friderika II (1996)
- Boldog vagyok ("I Am Happy") (1998)
- Kincs, ami van ("Treasure") (1999)
- Hazatalálsz ("You'll Find the Way Home") (2001)
- Gospel (2003)
- Sáron rózsája ("Rose of Sharon") (2006)

Albums for Children:

- Bölcsődalok ("Lullabies")
- Az álmok tengerén (Bölcsődalok 2) ("On the sea of dreams (Lullabies 2)") (2003)

Awards and achievements
Preceded by None	Hungary in the Eurovision Song Contest; 1994	Succeeded by Csaba Szigeti with "Új név egy régi ház falán"
