= Poland in the Eurovision Song Contest 1994 =

- Eurovision Song Contest 1994
- Participating broadcaster: Telewizja Polska (TVP)
- Country: Poland
- Selection process: Internal selection
- Announcement date: 16 April 1994

Competing entry
- Song: "To nie ja!"
- Artist: Edyta Górniak
- Songwriters: Jacek Cygan; Stanisław Syrewicz

Placement
- Final result: 2nd, 166 points

Participation chronology

Poland was represented at the Eurovision Song Contest 1994 with the song "To nie ja!", composed by Stanisław Syrewicz, with lyrics by Jacek Cygan, and performed by Edyta Górniak. The Polish participating broadcaster, Telewizja Polska (TVP), internally selected its entry for the contest. TVP initially selected Edyta Bartosiewicz to represent Poland, however, she refused and Edyta Górniak was ultimately selected. The song and performer were announced on 16 April 1994. This was the first-ever entry from Poland in the Eurovision Song Contest, and the first-ever entry performed in Polish in the contest.

Poland competed in the Eurovision Song Contest which took place on 30 April 1994. Performing during the show in position 24, Poland placed second out of the 25 participating countries, scoring 166 points. This marked the country's best result in the contest so far.

== Background ==
Prior to Poland's debut, the contest was broadcast in the country by TV Polska between 1965 and 1967, Telewizja Polska (TP) in 1968, 1970, 1971 and 1974, TP1 between 1975 and 1978 and again between 1981 and 1991, and TVP1 in 1992 and 1993 featuring commentary by Artur Orzech and Maria Szabłowska. Telewizja Polska (TVP) is a full member of the European Broadcasting Union (EBU) since 1 January 1993, thus eligible to participate in the Eurovision Song Contest since then. However, the broadcaster decided against participating in 1993 due to changes in its structure and related financial obligations, with the assumption a debut would materialise in 1994.

As part of its duties as participating broadcaster, TVP organised the selection of its entry in the contest and broadcast the event in the country. It internally selected its debut entry in 1994.

== Before Eurovision ==
=== Internal selection ===
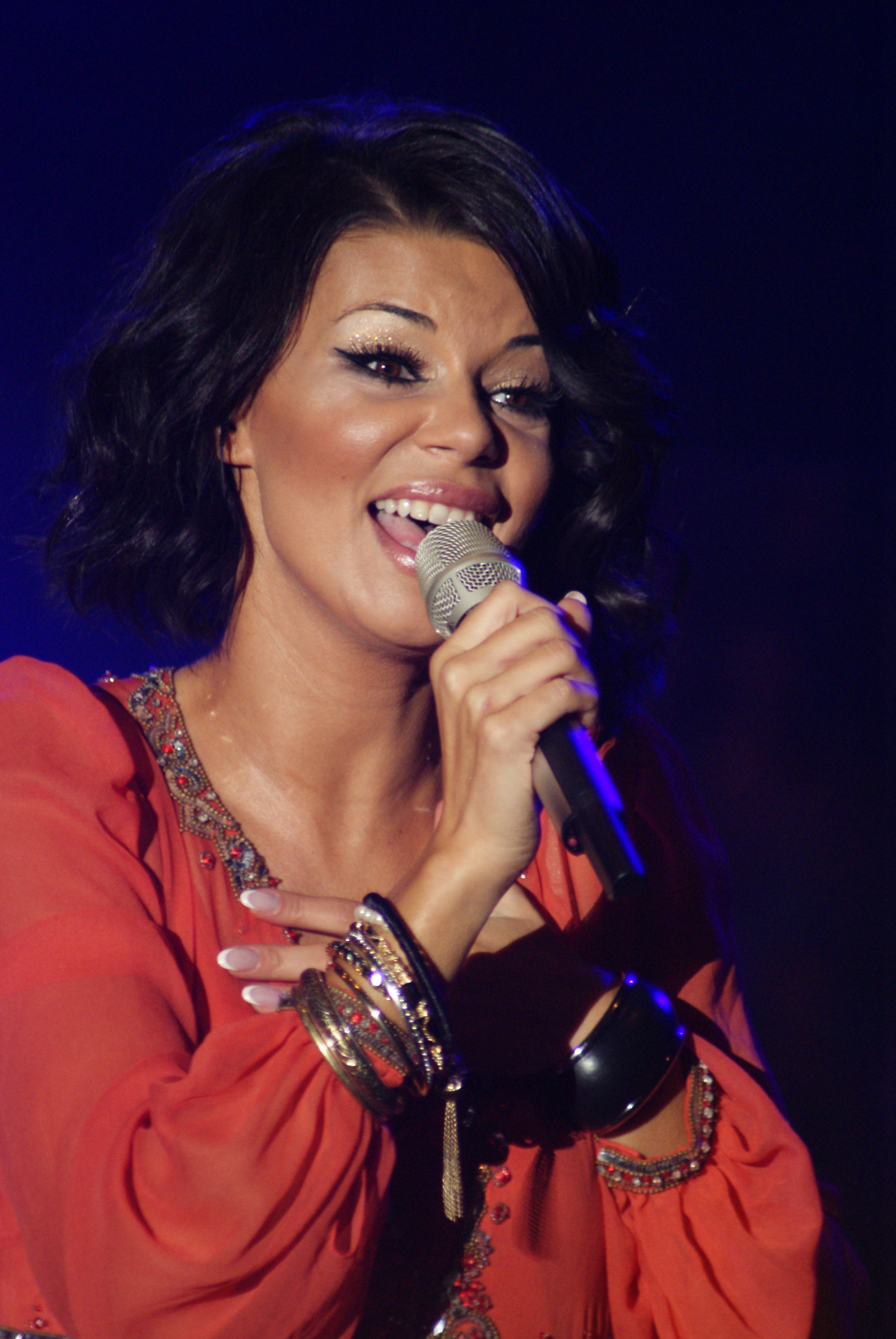
Edyta Górniak (pictured in 2008) was internally selected by Telewizja Polska to represent Poland in Dublin.

TVP internally selected its entry for the Eurovision Song Contest 1994. Initially, it approached established singer-songwriter Edyta Bartosiewicz, but she declined, believing that "Eurovision did not align with her artistic aspirations". The broadcaster then turned to Edyta Górniak, a young vocalist best known for her performance in the musical Metro, who agreed to represent the country; originally, TVP planned for Górniak to perform a different song, composed by Włodzimierz Korcz with lyrics by Wojciech Młynarski, though she was not convinced by the proposed composition, requesting her manager Wiktor Kubiak to search for a replacement song. He would later curate "To nie ja!" (originally entitled "Płonąca marionetka"; transl. "Burning doll", a reference to the winning entry of the 1965 contest), a demo of which was originally composed by Stanisław Syrewicz in 1984 alongside English-language lyrics for the band Chicago, which had discarded it, with new lyrics written for Górniak by Jacek Cygan (though in English, not knowing the song would be entered into the contest). Upon first hearing the English-language demo, Górniak was not particularly impressed, describing it as "kitsch", but despite her initial reservations, she agreed to perform the song, which was translated into Polish for the competition.

During a key meeting with TVP officials at a late stage in the preparations process, where she was expected to present the final version of the initially selected entry, Górniak instead performed "To nie ja!", setting a change of the selected entry as the ultimatum for her participation in the contest; despite initial hesitation, the broadcaster ultimately agreed and the song was chosen as Poland’s entry. The announcement of the artist and the release of the song took place on 16 April 1994 during a special TVP1 programme hosted by Bogumiła Wander. The issue of the song selection would later come up again, with TVP repeatedly attempting to pressure Górniak into singing another song after she had already arrived in Dublin, though she refused to give in, sticking with "To nie ja!".

"I can't believe that I was chosen. I am so happy, proud and moved. This is the greatest honor that could have happened to me, that I was chosen to represent Poland. I will try to do it with dignity and do it in such a way that you will be proud of me, that I will not have to be ashamed of anything."

— Edyta Górniak

== At Eurovision ==
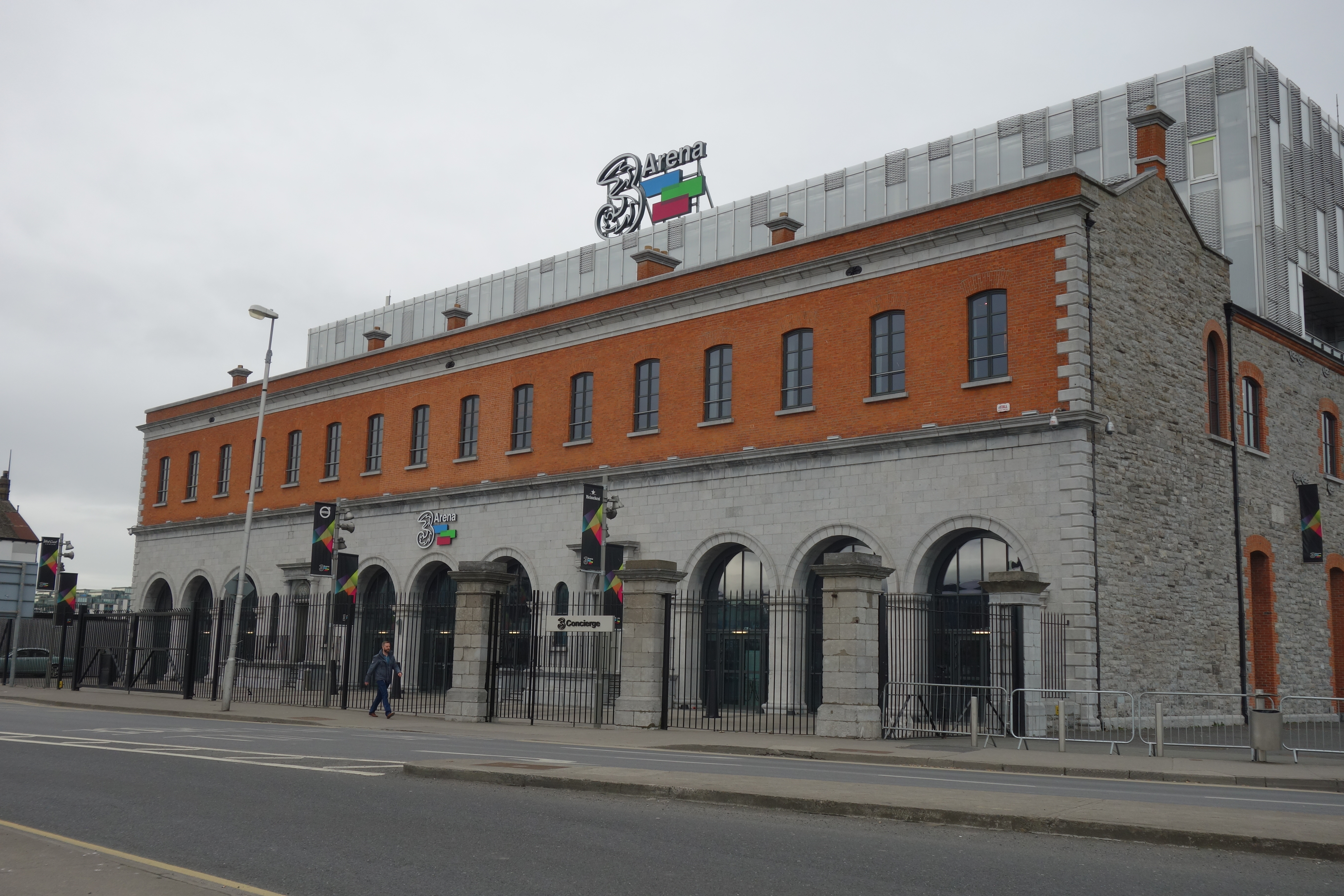
Eurovision Song Contest 1994 took place at the Point Theatre in Dublin, Ireland, on 30 April 1994.

The Eurovision Song Contest 1994 took place at the Point Theatre in Dublin, Ireland, on 30 April 1994. According to the Eurovision rules, the 25-country participant list for the contest was composed of: the winning country from the previous year's contest and host country Ireland, top placed 18 countries, other than the previous year's winner, from the previous year's contest and any eligible countries who didn't participate in 1993 contest. Poland was one of the eligible countries who didn't participate in 1993 contest, and thus were permitted to participate. Poland performed 24th at the 1994 contest, following Russia and preceding France.

The Polish performance featured Gorniak on stage wearing a short white dress and flat-heeled shoes. During the performance, Edyta was joined by three backing vocalists: Alicja Borkowska, Pauline Bolger and Robin Grant. After the voting concluded, Poland scored 166 points, including five sets of highest score of 12 points, from Austria, Estonia, France, Lithuania and United Kingdom; and placed 2nd. This, as of 2026, remains Poland's best placing in its competitive history, and the nation's first and only finish in top 5.

The contest was broadcast on TVP1, with commentary by Artur Orzech.

=== Language controversy ===
There was no free-language rule in operation at the time, and the furor erupted at the dress rehearsal when Górniak sung the second half of "To nie ja!" in English. According to Edyta, the reason for this decision was health problems, namely a cold as a result of hypothermia and the belief that it is easier to sing in English than in Polish. After the decision to sing in English at the rehearsal, six delegations ultimately raised their objections and formally petitioned for Poland to be disqualified, however Eurovision rules required a majority of delegations (13 in this case) to complain before the European Broadcasting Union could examine the case for disqualification, so Poland was allowed to remain.

=== Voting ===
The same voting system in use since 1975 was again implemented for 1994 contest, with each country providing 1–8, 10 and 12 points to the ten highest-ranking songs as determined by a jury panel, with countries not allowed to vote for themselves. Poland assembled 16-member jury panel, headed by Janusz Kosiński and consisting of Irena Santor, Włodzimierz Korcz, Anna Maria Jopek, Tadeusz Woźniak, Maciej Chmiel, Szymon Majewski, Małgorzata Szniak, Marek Gaszyński, Marek Niedźwiecki, Tomasz Justyński, Anna Rutkowska, Jacek Olechowski, Agnieszka Gach, Ilona Skrętna, Maria Teodorowicz and Elżbieta Chełstowska, to determine which countries would receive their points. The Polish spokesperson, who announced the points awarded by the Polish jury during the final, was Jan Chojnacki. Below is a breakdown of points awarded to Poland and awarded by Poland in the contest. The Polish jury awarded its 12 points to Hungary.

Points awarded to Poland
Score	Country
12 points	Austria; Estonia; France; Lithuania; United Kingdom
10 points	Germany; Switzerland
8 points	Bosnia and Herzegovina; Croatia; Finland; Hungary; Netherlands
7 points	Ireland; Portugal; Romania
6 points	Iceland; Norway; Russia
5 points	
4 points	Slovakia
3 points	
2 points	Malta
1 point	Cyprus

Points awarded by Poland
Score	Country
12 points	Hungary
10 points	Russia
8 points	Ireland
7 points	Germany
6 points	France
5 points	Cyprus
4 points	Iceland
3 points	United Kingdom
2 points	Greece
1 point	Portugal

== After Eurovision ==
After the final, two music videos were released, one for the English version entitled "Once in a Lifetime" and another for the Polish version. "To nie ja" starts with Górniak singing on a dark stage surrounded by smoke and blue light. Inserts of her singing in the recording studio occur throughout the video. For "Once in a Lifetime", Górniak wears yellow clothes in front of a white background, while the camera shows her from different perspectives. After the participation in the Eurovision Song Contest, Górniak was invited to perform the song in the two biggest music festivals in Poland: the National Festival of Polish Song in Opole and the Sopot Festival. The song was certified gold in Poland in 1999. In 2015 it was declared the best Polish hit of the '90s by the viewers of the TV channel Kino Polska Muzyka.

After the final of the contest, Israeli singer Joni Nameri accused the author of the song "To nie ja!" Stanislav Sirevich of plagiarizing his song "A Man in Love", released in 1987. Sirevich responded to the accusations, explaining that he composed the melody of "To nie ja" three years earlier than Nameri, in 1984.
