= Masha Katz =

Russian singer (born 1973)

- Маша Кац
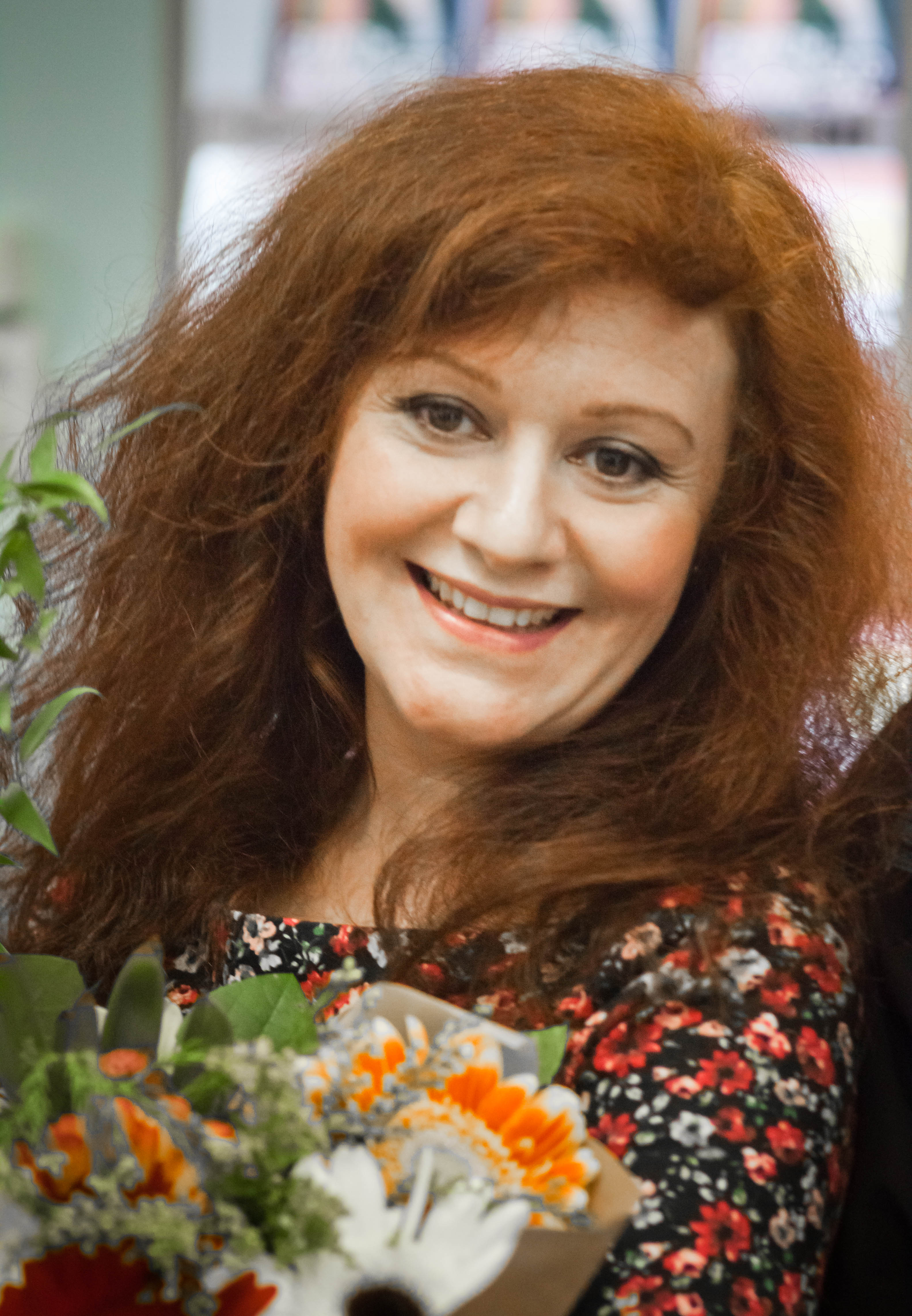
- Katz in 2017
- Born: Maria Lvovna Katz; 23 January 1973 (age 53); Moscow, Russian SFSR, USSR
- Other name: Youddiph
- Occupations: Singer; Songwriter
- Years active: 1989 - present
- Partner: Andrey Makarevich
- Children: 1
- Musical career
- Genres: Rhythm and blues; Rock; Pop
- Instrument: Voice
- Website: http://mashakatz.ru/

Maria Lvovna "Masha" Katz (Russian: Мари́я Льво́вна "Ма́ша" Кац; born 23 January 1973), also known by her stage name Youddiph (Russian: Юди́фь, romanized: Yudif, lit. 'Judith'), is a Russian singer. She is best known for representing Russia in the Eurovision Song Contest 1994 held in Dublin, the first time Russia has competed in the competition.

== Biography ==
Masha was born on 23 January 1973 in Moscow. At the age of 13 she formed her first group performing heavy metal songs. In 1989 she met with the famous poet Karen Kavaleryan who helped her to launch a professional career. For the next 5 years Masha worked as a backing vocalist for numerous Russian artists and groups.

In 1994 she represented Russia in the Eurovision Song Contest 1994 with the song "Vyechniy stranik" (Вечный странник). Maria performed 23rd at the final night and ranked 9th with 70 points. Later that year she released her first album entitled "Magic Word".

Masha continued to work with various musicians and formed a duo with a Russian drummer under the name "Beauty and the Beast". In 1997 she created a new group, called "Maryland". The group made an album in 1998 entitled Ryzhiy blues (Russian: Рыжий Блюз - Ginger Blues). In 2000 she was presented with two important music awards while creating her own music company.

Masha also dubbed musicals and films for the Russian television and cinema, including Anastasia, for which she was presented with a special prize of 20th Century Fox for the best native language performance. Nowadays Maria continues to sing in clubs, doing backing vocals for famous singers and works as a vocal coach.

She has a daughter Seraphima Katz, born in 2001.

== The Voice Blind Audition ==
In 2015, Masha Katz auditioned for the Russian edition of Dutch TV series The Voice. Two judges turned their chairs, and eventually she chose to join the team of Grigory Leps.

Awards and achievements
Preceded by None	Russia in the Eurovision Song Contest; 1994	Succeeded by Philipp Kirkorov with "Kolybelnaya dlya vulkana"
