= Petra Frey =

Austrian singer

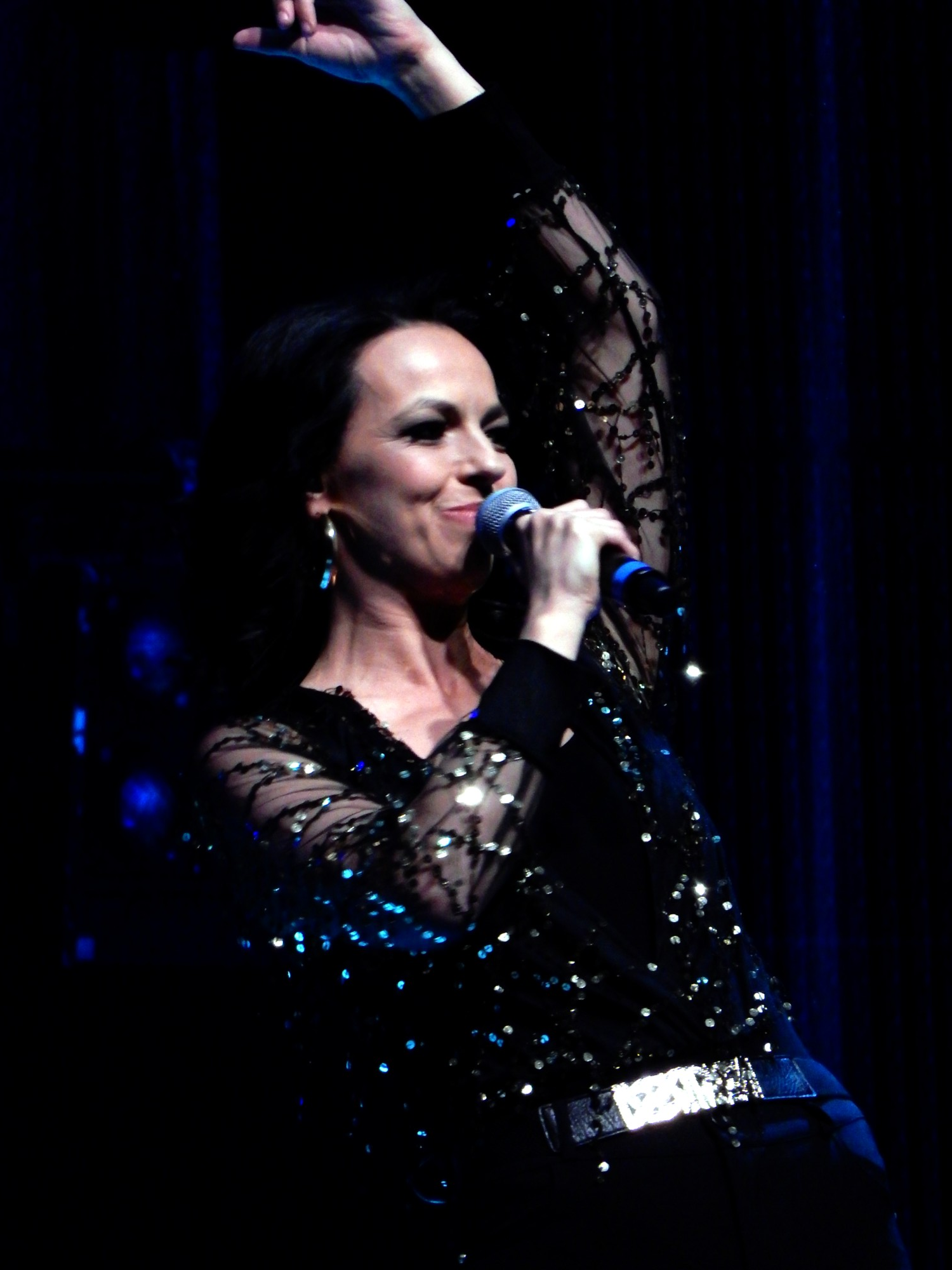

Background information
- Born: 27 June 1978 (age 48); Wattens
- Years active: 1993–present

Petra Frey (born 27 June 1978), is an Austrian singer. She has released twelve studio albums and five compilation albums and participated in the Eurovision Song Contest.

== Biography ==
Frey was born in Wattens, and released her debut album, Bloß Träume im Kopf in 1993, she represented Austria in the Eurovision Song Contest in 1994 with the song "Für den Frieden der Welt" (For the peace of the world), which came 17th in the international final. She also came second in the Austrian national final in 2003 with the song This Night Should Never End. In 2007, after a few years break, Petra returned to the schlager scene with her new album Göttlich weiblich, her first on the DA Records label. Petra attempted to represent Austria at Eurovision again in 2011, with Send a Little Smile, but she failed to qualify from the Internet semi final stage.

Since September 2014 she is jury member at the talent-show Die große Chance.

Her Twelfth studio album Einfach Frey was released in April 2011, and she continues to have success in the schlager market to this day.

== Discography ==
Studio Albums

- 1993 – Bloß Träume im Kopf
- 1995 – Hey Du
- 1996 – Liebst Du mich
- 1998 – Küß mich…
- 1999 – Heiß und kalt
- 2001 – Geboren um Dich zu lieben
- 2002 – Das ist mein Leben
- 2004 – Freyheiten
- 2007 – Göttlich weiblich
- 2008 – Selbstbewusst
- 2009 – Feuer und Eis
- 2011 – Einfach Frey

Compilations

- 1998 – Herz in Sicht
- 2001 – Made in Austria
- 2003 – Meine Erfolge
- 2003 – Nimm mein Herz
- 2010 – Meine Besten

Preceded by Tony Wegas	Austria in the Eurovision Song Contest; 1994	Succeeded by Stella Jones
