= Ireland in the Eurovision Song Contest 1994 =

- Eurovision Song Contest 1994
- Participating broadcaster: Radio Telefís Éireann (RTÉ)
- Country: Ireland
- Selection process: Eurosong '94
- Selection date: 13 March 1994

Competing entry
- Song: "Rock 'n' Roll Kids"
- Artist: Paul Harrington and Charlie McGettigan
- Songwriter: Brendan Graham

Placement
- Final result: 1st, 226 points

Participation chronology

Ireland was represented at the Eurovision Song Contest 1994 with the song "Rock 'n' Roll Kids", written by Brendan Graham, and performed by Paul Harrington and Charlie McGettigan. The Irish participating broadcaster, Radio Telefís Éireann (RTÉ), selected its entry through a national final, which ultimately won the contest. In addition, RTÉ was also the host broadcaster for the second year in a row and staged the event at the Point Theatre in Dublin, after winning the previous edition with the song "In Your Eyes" by Niamh Kavanagh.

== Before Eurovision ==
=== Eurosong '94 ===
Radio Telefís Éireann (RTÉ) held Eurosong '94 in the University Concert Hall in Limerick on 13 March 1994. Pat Kenny hosted the event. The eight songs presented were then voted on by ten regional juries.

Charlie McGettigan had previously competed in Ireland's national final selection in 1984 and 1987, placing third both times.

R/O	Artist	Song	Points	Place
1	Henry Winter	"Remember Heaven"	56	6
2	Orna McNamara	"Crystal Eyes"	87	2
3	Nightshade	"Open Your Heart"	48	7
4	Darren Holden	"After Tonight"	81	3
5	Robyn Grant	"Time To Decide"	59	5
6	Paul Harrington and Charlie McGettigan	"Rock 'n' Roll Kids"	110	1
7	Fiona Kennedy	"Ní scaoilfidh mé leat go deo"	47	8
8	Anne Buckley	"I Won't Surrender"	62	4

== At Eurovision ==
"Rock 'n' Roll Kids" was performed third in the running order on the night of the contest, following Finland and preceding Cyprus. The song went on to win the contest with a record-breaking 226 points, a sixty-point lead over runner-up Poland, this was their third win in a row, and their sixth overall. Both were Eurovision records - no country had previously managed to win three years in a row, but their scoring record would be taken three years later when Katrina and the Waves won the 1997 contest with "Love Shine a Light". In addition, that was Ireland's highest scoring entry at the time, which stood for thirty years until the 2024 edition when Bambie Thug finished in sixth place with "Doomsday Blue".

The contest was broadcast on RTÉ 1 (with commentary by Pat Kenny) and on radio station RTÉ Radio 1 (with commentary by Larry Gogan).

=== Voting ===
Points awarded to Ireland
Score	Country
12 points	Croatia; Germany; Iceland; Netherlands; Norway; Portugal; Russia; Switzerland
10 points	Austria; Bosnia and Herzegovina; Estonia; Hungary; Lithuania; Spain; Sweden; United Kingdom
8 points	Cyprus; France; Poland; Romania
7 points	Finland
6 points	Slovakia
5 points	Malta
4 points	
3 points	
2 points	
1 point	

Points awarded by Ireland
Score	Country
12 points	Hungary
10 points	Malta
8 points	Portugal
7 points	Poland
6 points	Iceland
5 points	Germany
4 points	Russia
3 points	Norway
2 points	France
1 point	United Kingdom
