= Netherlands in the Eurovision Song Contest 1994 =

- Eurovision Song Contest 1994
- Participating broadcaster: Nederlandse Omroep Stichting (NOS)
- Country: Netherlands
- Selection process: Artist: Internal selection Song: Nationaal Songfestival 1994
- Selection date: Artist: 2 November 1993; Song: 26 March 1994

Competing entry
- Song: "Waar is de zon"
- Artist: Willeke Alberti
- Songwriters: Edwin Schimscheimer; Coot van Doesburgh

Placement
- Final result: 23rd, 4 points

Participation chronology

The Netherlands was represented at the Eurovision Song Contest 1994 with the song "Waar is de zon" composed by Edwin Schimscheimer, with lyrics by Coot van Doesburgh, and performed by Willeke Alberti. The Dutch participating broadcaster, Nederlandse Omroep Stichting (NOS), selected its entry for the contest through a national final, after having previously selected the performer internally.

NOS announced Alberti's appointment as its representative on 2 November 1993, while it organised the national final Nationaal Songfestival 1994 in order to select the song. Eight songs competed in the national final on 26 March 1994 where "Waar is de zon" was selected as the winning song following the votes from twelve regional juries.

The Netherlands competed in the Eurovision Song Contest which took place on 30 April 1994. Performing during the show in position 13, the Netherlands placed twenty-third out of the 25 participating countries, scoring 4 points.

== Background ==
Prior to the 1994 contest, Nederlandse Televisie Stichting (NTS) until 1969, and Nederlandse Omroep Stichting (NOS) since 1970, had participated in the Eurovision Song Contest representing the Netherlands thirty-six times since NTS début in the inaugural contest in 1956. They have won the contest four times: in 1957 with the song "Net als toen" performed by Corry Brokken; in 1959 with the song "'n Beetje" performed by Teddy Scholten; in 1969 as one of four countries to tie for first place with "De troubadour" performed by Lenny Kuhr; and finally in 1975 with "Ding-a-dong" performed by the group Teach-In. The Dutch least successful result has been last place, which they have achieved on four occasions, most recently in the 1968 contest. They has also received nul points on two occasions; in 1962 and 1963.

As part of its duties as participating broadcaster, NOS organises the selection of its entry in the Eurovision Song Contest and broadcasts the event in the country. The Dutch broadcasters had used various methods to select the Dutch entry in the past, such as the Nationaal Songfestival, a live televised national final to choose the performer, song or both to compete at Eurovision. However, internal selections have also been held on occasion. In 1993, NOS has internally selected its artist for the contest, while Nationaal Songfestival 1993 was organised in order to select the song. The same method was continued for the 1994 Dutch entry.

== Before Eurovision ==
=== Artist selection ===
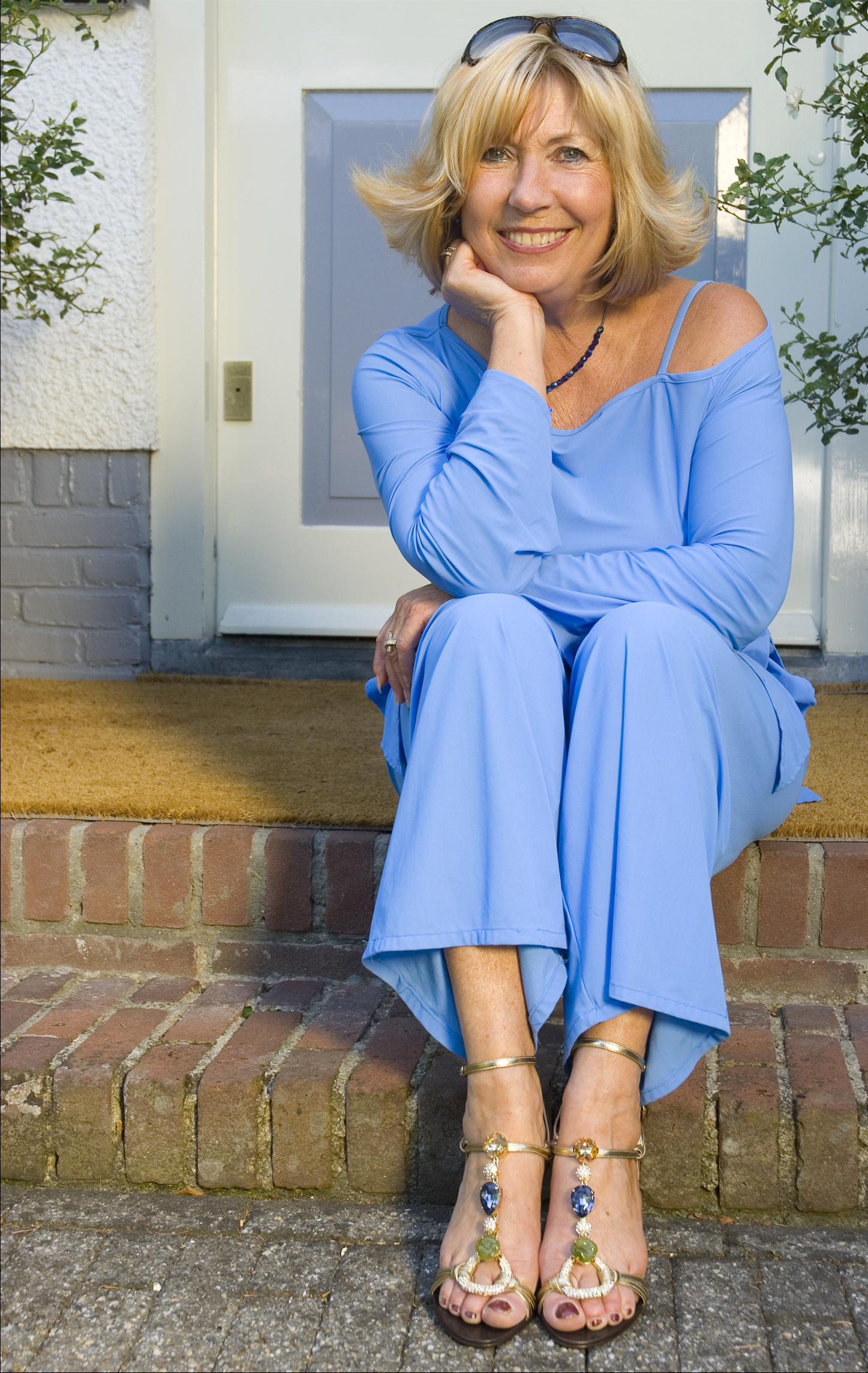
Willeke Alberti (pictured in 2006) was internally selected to represent the Netherlands in 1994

Following Ruth Jacott's sixth place in 1993 with the song "Vrede", the Dutch broadcaster continued to internally select the artist for the Eurovision Song Contest. Artists that were rumoured in Dutch media to be in talks with NOS included singer Gordon Heuckeroth. On 2 November 1993, NOS announced that they had selected singer Willeke Alberti to represent the Netherlands at the 1994 contest. The proposal of Alberti as the Dutch representative came from television personality and singer Paul de Leeuw, while the selection occurred through the decision of a selection commission that included VARA director Willem van Beusekom. It was also revealed that her Eurovision song would be selected through the national final Nationaal Songfestival 1994.

=== Nationaal Songfestival 1994 ===
A submission period was opened by the Association of Professional Light Music Authors (PALM) where its members were able to submit their songs. 300 songs were received by the association at the closing of the deadline and the eight selected competing songs were announced on 7 March 1994. The selection of the songs for the competition occurred through the decision of a selection commission consisting of Willeke Alberti, Ruth Jacott, Willem van Beusekom, conductor Harry van Hoof and producer Roy Beltman.

The national final took place on 26 March 1994 at the AT&T Danstheater in The Hague, hosted by Paul de Leeuw and was broadcast on Nederland 3. All eight competing songs were performed by Alberti, accompanied by the Metropole Orchestra conducted by Harry van Hoof, and the winning song, "Waar is de zon", was selected by the votes of 12 regional juries. The winning songwriters, Edwin Schimscheimer and Coot van Doesburgh, received a monetary prize of 10,000 Dutch guilders from the Conamus music organisation.

Final – 26 March 1994
R/O	Song	Songwriter(s)	Points	Place
1	"Zonder jou"	Ben Drossaers, Angelo Smulders	56	4
2	"Champagne"	Pim Koopman, Jeroen Englebert	47	6
3	"Dromen"	Peter van Asten, Mieke Melgers	55	5
4	"Laat ons dansen"	Peter van Asten, Paul de Leeuw	37	8
5	"Tussen jou en mij"	Jochem Fluitsma, Eric van Tijn, Hans van Pol	57	3
6	"Zomaar een dag"	Cor Bakker, Dirk Keijzer, Paul de Leeuw	78	2
7	"Déjà vu"	Pim Koopman, Jeroen Englebert	47	6
8	"Waar is de zon"	Edwin Schimscheimer, Coot van Doesburgh	91	1

Detailed Regional Jury Votes
R/O	Song	Friesland	Drenthe	Overijssel	Gelderland	Utrecht	Flevoland	North Holland	South Holland	Zeeland	North Brabant	Limburg	Groningen	Total
1	"Zonder jou"	5	5	5	5	10	1	8	2	2	3	8	2	56
2	"Champagne"	2	3	3	3	5	8	4	10	1	6	1	1	47
3	"Dromen"	3	10	2	6	8	2	5	5	3	2	6	3	55
4	"Laat ons dansen"	6	1	1	4	1	4	6	1	4	1	3	5	37
5	"Tussen jou en mij"	4	2	4	8	6	6	3	3	6	4	5	6	57
6	"Zomaar een dag"	8	6	8	2	4	10	10	8	5	5	4	8	78
7	"Déjà vu"	1	4	6	1	3	3	1	4	10	8	2	4	47
8	"Waar is de zon"	10	8	10	10	2	5	2	6	8	10	10	10	91

== At Eurovision ==
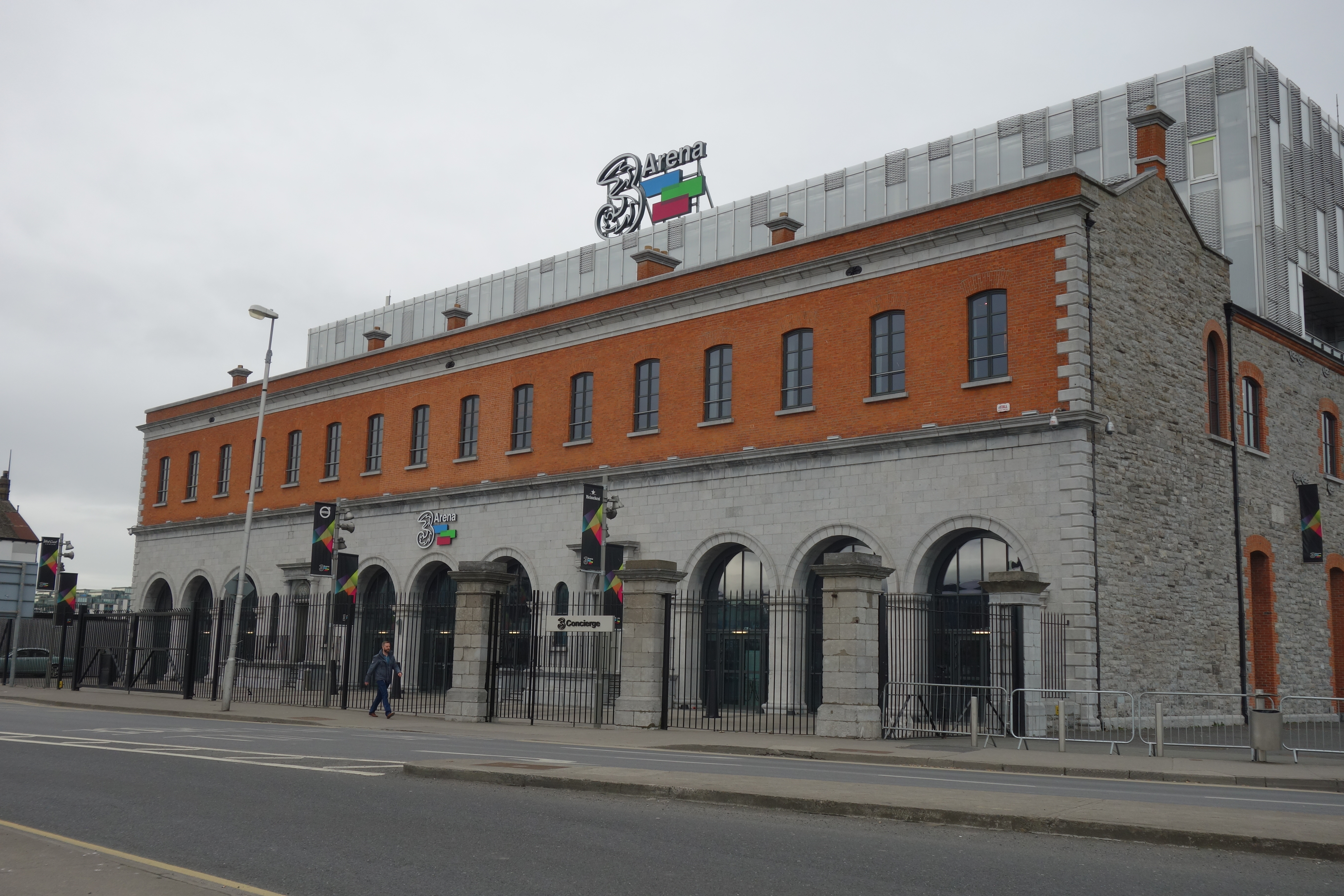
Eurovision Song Contest 1994 took place at the Point Theatre in Dublin, Ireland, on 30 April 1994.

The Eurovision Song Contest 1994 took place at the Point Theatre in Dublin, Ireland, on 30 April 1994. According to the Eurovision rules, the 25-country participant list for the contest was composed of: the winning country from the previous year's contest and host country Ireland, the seven lowest-scoring countries in the 1993 contest, and any eligible countries which didn't participate in 1993 contest. As the Netherlands placed sixth in the 1993 contest, the nation was thus permitted to participate. On 16 November 1993, an allocation draw was held which determined the running order and the Netherlands was set to perform in position 13, following the entry from Malta and before the entry from Germany. The Dutch conductor at the contest was Harry van Hoof, and the Netherlands finished in twenty-third place with 4 points.

The contest was broadcast on Nederland 3, with commentary by Willem van Beusekom. The contest was seen by 3.6 million viewers in the Netherlands. NOS appointed Joop van Os as its spokesperson to announce the votes of the Dutch jury during the final.

=== Voting ===
Below is a breakdown of points awarded to the Netherlands and awarded by the Netherlands in the contest. The nation awarded its 12 points to Ireland in the contest.

Points awarded to the Netherlands
Score	Country
12 points	
10 points	
8 points	
7 points	
6 points	
5 points	
4 points	Austria
3 points	
2 points	
1 point	

Points awarded by the Netherlands
Score	Country
12 points	Ireland
10 points	Hungary
8 points	Poland
7 points	Norway
6 points	Sweden
5 points	Russia
4 points	Germany
3 points	Portugal
2 points	United Kingdom
1 point	Malta
