= Austria in the Eurovision Song Contest 1994 =

- Eurovision Song Contest 1994
- Participating broadcaster: Österreichischer Rundfunk (ORF)
- Country: Austria
- Selection process: National final
- Selection date: 8 March 1994

Competing entry
- Song: "Für den Frieden der Welt"
- Artist: Petra Frey
- Songwriters: Alfons Weindorf; Karl Brunner; Johann Brunner

Placement
- Final result: 17th, 19 points

Participation chronology

Austria was represented at the Eurovision Song Contest 1994 with the song "Für den Frieden der Welt", composed by Alfons Weindorf, with lyrics by Karl Brunner and Johann Brunner, and performed by Petra Frey. The Austrian participating broadcaster Österreichischer Rundfunk (ORF), selected its entry through a national final.

== Before Eurovision ==
=== National final ===
Österreichischer Rundfunk (ORF) held the national final on 8 March 1994 at the Nachtwerk Nightclub in Vienna, hosted by Alfons Haider. The winner was chosen by the votes of 9 regional juries.

Final – 8 March 1994
R/O	Artist	Song	Points	Place
1	Three Girl Madhouse	"Solitaire"	49	2
2	Simone	"Radio"	32	4
3	Petra Frey	"Für den Frieden der Welt"	57	1
4	Carl Peyer	"Du und i"	33	3
5	Jane Palmer	"Flieg' heute Nacht"	20	5
6	Etta Scollo	"Amico Pierre"	8	7
7	Alex	"Highway"	13	6
8	Marc Berry	"Swingin' Out"	4	8

Detailed Regional Jury Votes
R/O	Song	Upper Austria	Salzburg	Tyrol	Vorarlberg	Carinthia	Styria	Burgenland	Vienna	Lower Austria	Total
1	"Solitaire"	6	8	3	3	3	8	4	8	6	49
2	"Radio"	3	1		6	6	6	3	3	4	32
3	"Für den Frieden der Welt"	8	3	8	8	4	4	8	6	8	57
4	"Du und i"	4	6	4	4	2	2	6	4	1	33
5	"Flieg' heute Nacht"		4	1	2	8	3	1	1		20
6	"Amico Pierre"	1		2	1			2	2		8
7	"Highway"	2	2	6			1			2	13
8	"Swingin' Out"					1				3	4

== At Eurovision ==
On the night of the final, Frey perfromed 20th in the running order, following Greece and preceding Spain. At the close of the voting, "Für den Frieden der Welt" had received 19 points, placing Austria 17th of the 25 entries. The Austrian jury awarded its 12 points to Poland.

The contest was broadcast on ORF 1, with commentary by Ernst Grissemann.

=== Voting ===
Points awarded to Austria
Score	Country
12 points	
10 points	
8 points	
7 points	Cyprus
6 points	
5 points	Bosnia and Herzegovina
4 points	
3 points	United Kingdom
2 points	Croatia
1 point	Romania; Sweden

Points awarded by Austria
Score	Country
12 points	Poland
10 points	Ireland
8 points	Hungary
7 points	France
6 points	Russia
5 points	Sweden
4 points	Netherlands
3 points	Iceland
2 points	Germany
1 point	United Kingdom
