= Russia in the Eurovision Song Contest 1994 =

- Eurovision Song Contest 1994
- Country: Russia
- Selection process: National final
- Selection date: 12 March 1994

Competing entry
- Song: "Vechny strannik"
- Artist: Youddiph
- Songwriters: Lev Zemlinski; Piligrim

Placement
- Final result: 9th, 70 points

Participation chronology

Russia debuted in the Eurovision Song Contest 1994, held on 30 April 1994 at the Point Theater in Dublin, Ireland. The Russian broadcaster RTR organised a public selection process to determine its entry for the contest. Held on 12 March 1994 in Moscow, the event saw nine songs compete to be the Russian entry; the results were determined by the jury panel. The song "Vechny strannik" (given the title "Eternal Wanderer" in Eurovision), written by Lev Zemlinski and Piligrim, and performed by Youddiph received the most votes and was selected to represent the nation. Russia performed 23rd out of the 25 countries competing in the contest and at the close of the voting process, finished in 9th place, receiving 70 points.

== Background ==
On 26 February 1994, the Russian national broadcaster, RTR, confirmed their intentions to debut at the Eurovision Song Contest 1994 for the first time. The nation had previously planned to debut at the Eurovision Song Contest in 1993, however, the broadcaster later withdrew their application for unknown reasons. RTR, which broadcast the 1992 and 1993 contests in Russia, organised the selection process for the nation's entry in addition to broadcasting further events within the nation. Along with the participation confirmation, the broadcaster confirmed that the Russian entry for the 1994 contest would be selected through a national selection.

== Before Eurovision ==
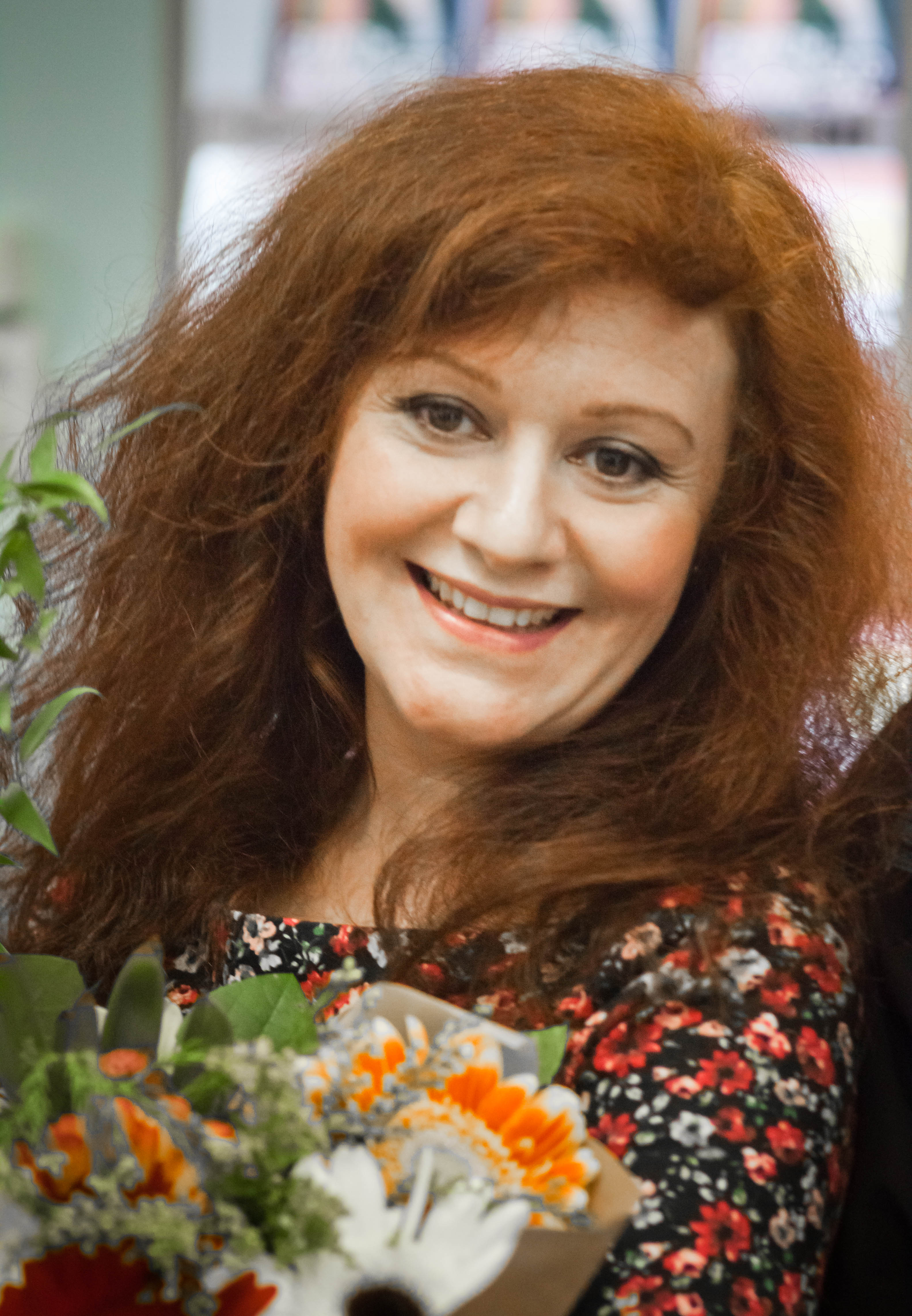
Youddiph (pictured in 2017) was selected to represent Russia in the Eurovision Song Contest 1994

=== National final ===
To select its entry for the Eurovision Song Contest 1994, RTR hosted a national final on 12 March 1994 at the Shabolovka Studios in Moscow during the television programme Programma A. National final was hosted by Vadim Dolgachev. Prior to the event, RTR opened a submissions window for Russian citizens to submit their original songs for consideration. By the close of the submissions window, more than 30 songs had been submitted; eleven candidate entries were then selected by a jury panel from the received submissions. Two songs were later disqualified prior to the competition: "Oi oi oi" performed by Alena Apina was disqualified after being performed on Russian TV channel 2x2 prior to the competition and "Kogda vernus v Rossiyu" performed by Vika Tsiganova, which was withdrawn after Tsiganova wanted to change her contest song, which was not allowed by the rules. The disqualified songs were performed as part of the interval act. Nine remaining entries competed with the winning song chosen by a 17-member jury. At the close of voting, "Vechny strannik" performed by Youddiph received the most votes and was selected as the Russian entry.

Final – 12 March 1994
R/O	Artist	Song	Points	Place
1	Megapolis	"Pushkin" (Пушкин)	0	8
2	Youddiph	"Vechny strannik" (Вечный странник)	9	1
3	Andrey Misin	"Russkaya liricheskaya" (Русская лирическая)	4	3
4	Tatyana Martsynkovskaya	"Raspyatiye" (Распятие)	1	5
5	Sergey Penkin	"Vspomni" (Вспомни)	1	5
6	Nogu Svelo!	"Sibirskaya lyubov" (Сибирская любовь)	7	2
7	Kvartal	"Prileti ko mne" (Прилети ко мне)	1	5
8	Alyssa Mon	"Va-banque" (Ва-банк)	0	8
9	Elena Kirii	"Devki pesni raspevayut" (Девки песни распевают)	3	4

== At Eurovision ==
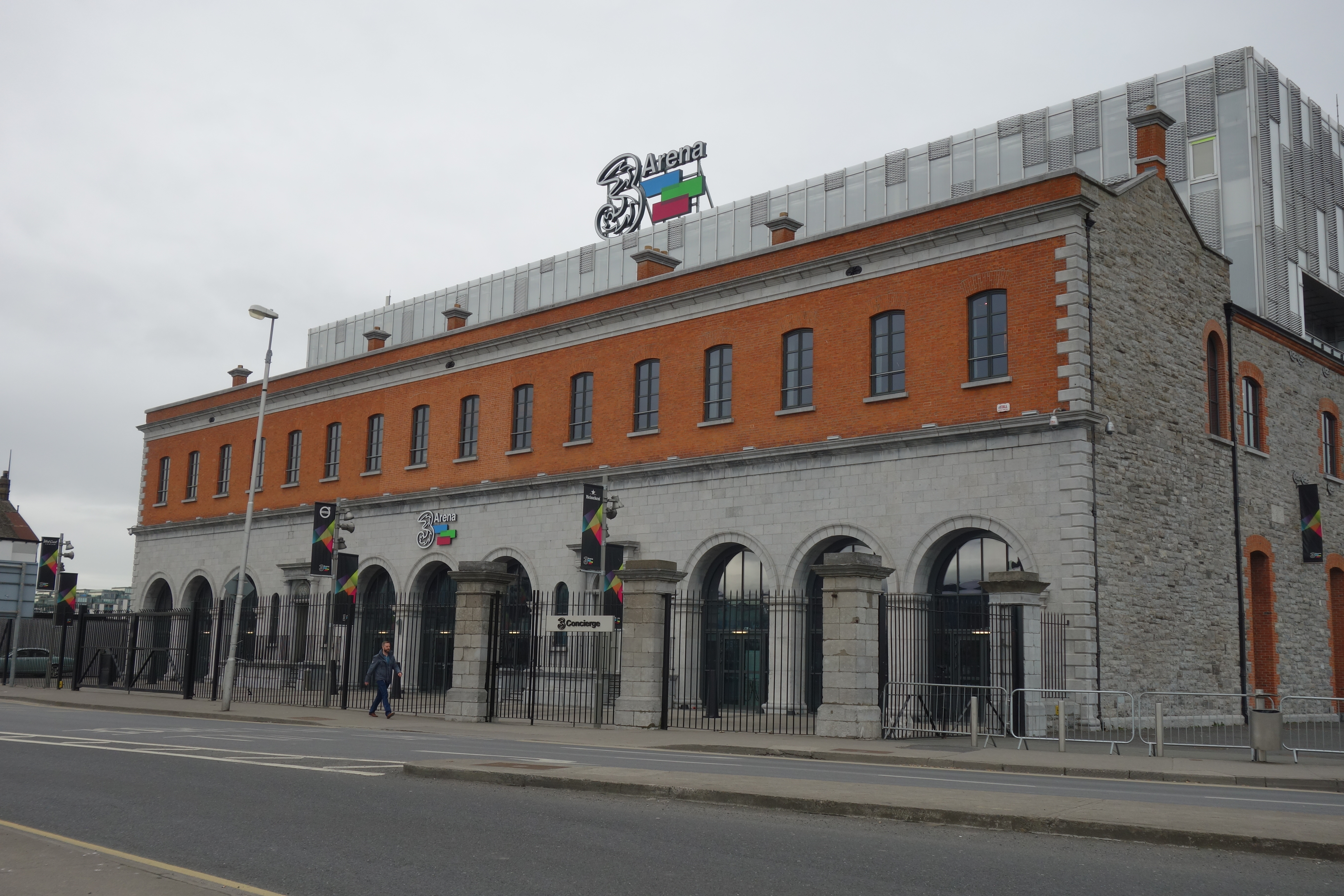
Eurovision Song Contest 1994 took place at the Point Theatre in Dublin, Ireland, on 30 April 1994.

The Eurovision Song Contest 1994 took place at the Point Theatre in Dublin, Ireland, on 30 April 1994. According to the Eurovision rules, the 25-country participant list for the contest was composed of: the winning country from the previous year's contest and host country Ireland, highest placed 18 countries, other than the previous year's winner, from the previous year's contest and any eligible countries who didn't participate in 1993 contest. As Russia was one of the eligible countries which did not compete in the 1993 contest, it was thus permitted to participate. Russia performed 23rd at the 1994 contest, following Hungary and preceding Poland. Eurovision Song Contest 1994 was televised in Russia on RTR with the commentary by Sergey Antipov.

Ahead to the contest Russia was considered by bookmakers to be the least likely country to win the competition. The Russian performance featured Youddiph on stage wearing a red dress designed by Pavel Kaplevich. During the performance, Youddiph was joined by two guitarists: Igor Khomich and Vadim Chebanov. After the voting concluded, Russia scored 70 points, and placed 9th in a field of 25. The Russian conductor at the contest was the composer of the song, Lev Zemlinski.

The contest was broadcast on RTR, and on delay on the Orbita satellite broadcasting system in the Russian Far East, both with commentary by Sergey Antipov. RTR appointed Irina Klenskaya as its spokesperson to announce the Russian jury's votes.

=== Voting ===
The same voting system in use since 1975 was again implemented for 1994 contest, with each country providing 1–8, 10 and 12 points to the ten highest-ranking songs as determined by a jury panel, with countries not allowed to vote for themselves. Below is a breakdown of points awarded to Russia and awarded by Russia in the contest. The nation awarded its 12 points to Ireland in the contest.

Points awarded to Russia
Score	Country
12 points	
10 points	Poland
8 points	
7 points	
6 points	Austria; Germany; Hungary; Lithuania
5 points	Netherlands; United Kingdom
4 points	Greece; Iceland; Ireland
3 points	Cyprus; Norway; Romania
2 points	Portugal
1 point	Croatia; Estonia; France

Points awarded by Russia
Score	Country
12 points	Ireland
10 points	France
8 points	Norway
7 points	Germany
6 points	Poland
5 points	United Kingdom
4 points	Portugal
3 points	Hungary
2 points	Cyprus
1 point	Iceland
