= Cyprus in the Eurovision Song Contest 1994 =

- Eurovision Song Contest 1994
- Participating broadcaster: Cyprus Broadcasting Corporation (CyBC)
- Country: Cyprus
- Selection process: Diagonismós Tragoudioú Giourovízion
- Selection date: 18 March 1994

Competing entry
- Song: "Eimai anthropos ki ego"
- Artist: Evridiki
- Songwriter: George Theofanous

Placement
- Final result: 11th, 51 points

Participation chronology

Cyprus was represented at the Eurovision Song Contest 1994 with the song "Eimai anthropos ki ego", written by George Theofanous and performed by Evridiki. The Cypriot participating broadcaster, the Cyprus Broadcasting Corporation (CyBC), selected its entry through a national final.

Originally, Cyprus was relegated from the contest as it finished in the bottom 7 of the 1993 contest; however, after Italy withdrew from the contest, their place was awarded to Cyprus, who ultimately competed.

== Before Eurovision ==
=== Diagonismós Tragoudioú Giourovízion ===
==== Competing entries ====
On 12 November 1993, after Italy announced their withdrawal, the Cyprus Broadcasting Corporation (CyBC) announced that they would participate in the 1994 contest. On the same day, a submission period for Cypriot artists and composers to submit songs was opened until 28 January 1994. By the end of the submission period, 93 entries had been submitted. On 20 February 1994, in radio room one in the CyBC buildings, a 12-member jury listened to the received submissions and chose eight songs to compete in the national final.

Competing entry selection jury member
- Andreas Papakyriakou
- Marios Skordis
- Eleni Stavridou
- Kitsa Kotzanastasi
- Mamas Chatziantonis
- Xenios Xenofontos
- Marinos Mitellas
- Sozos Charalampidis
- Poly Rousou
- Marianna Galidi
- Antzi Riga
- Foivos Papadopoulos

==== Final ====
The final was broadcast live at 21:00 (EET) on RIK 1 on 18 March 1994 in a show titled Diagonismós Tragoudioú Giourovízion (Greek: Διαγωνισμός Τραγουδιού Γιουροβίζιον). The contest was held at the International Conference Centre in Nicosia and was hosted by Achilleas Grammatikopoulos. The running order was decided by a random draw which was done in the presence of the songwriters of the competing entries. The winning song was chosen by a 12-member professional jury.

Final – 18 March 1994
R/O	Artist	Song	Songwriter(s)	Points	Place
1	Evridiki	"Eimai anthropos ki ego" (Είμαι άνθρωπος κι εγώ)	George Theofanous	103	1
2	Marietta Mitsidou	"Ela ksana" (Έλα ξανά)	Philippe de Castan, Stalo Karkampoulia	89	2
3	Panos Panayi	"I agapi nika" (Η αγάπη νικά)	Michalis Papyrou, Charis Koutsavakis	41	6
4	Christina Argyri	"Ksafnika" (Ξαφνικά)	Christina Argyri, Glafkos Efstathiou	67	3
5	Miranda Zografou	"Mia gi" (Μια γη)	Alex Zografou	55	4
6	Gregory Kerian	"Tora" (Τώρα)	Gregory Kerian, Soula Orfanidou	33	8
7	Joseph Christodoulou	"Stamata ton chrono" (Σταμάτα τον χρόνο)	Kypros Charalambous, Andreas Panteli	34	7
8	Maria Aristofanous	"Vradia adiana" (Βράδια αδειανά)	Koralia Schiza, Ilias Antoniadis	46	5

Detailed Jury Votes
R/O	Song	Jury												Total
R/O	Song	1	2	3	4	5	6	7	8	9	10	11	12	Total
1	"Eimai anthropos ki ego"	10	10	8	8	10	5	10	8	10	10	6	8	103
2	"Ela ksana"	6	8	10	10	8	10	6	10	8	4	8	1	89
3	"I agapi nika"	2	4	4	3	1	3	5	5	5	2	1	6	41
4	"Ksafnika"	5	6	6	6	6	4	3	3	6	8	10	4	67
5	"Mia gi"	8	5	3	2	3	6	8	6	1	3	5	5	55
6	"Tora"	1	1	1	4	4	2	2	2	4	6	3	3	33
7	"Stamata ton chrono"	4	3	2	1	2	1	1	4	3	1	2	10	34
8	"Vradia adiana"	3	2	5	5	5	8	4	1	2	5	4	2	46

== At Eurovision ==
In the summer of 1993 the European Broadcasting Union (EBU) confirmed that the seven lowest-scoring countries in the Eurovision Song Contest 1993 would be barred from entering the 1994 contest, to make way for seven countries which would participate for the first time. As Cyprus had placed in the bottom seven, the country was unable to compete in the 1994 contest. However later in 1993 RAI, the participating broadcaster from Italy, subsequently announced that it would not participate in the event, leading to Cyprus being readmitted as the relegated country with the best result at the 1993 contest.

On the night of the final, Evridiki performed fourth in the running order, following Ireland and preceding Iceland. At the closing of the voting, "Eimai anthropos ki ego" had received 51 points, placing Cyprus 11th out of 25 competing countries. The Cypriot jury awarded its 12 points to Greece.

The contest was broadcast on RIK 2 and on radio station Trito Programma.

=== Voting ===
Points awarded to Cyprus
Score	Country
12 points	Greece
10 points	Finland
8 points	
7 points	
6 points	
5 points	Norway; Poland; Portugal
4 points	Spain
3 points	France; Iceland
2 points	Russia; Switzerland
1 point	

Points awarded by Cyprus
Score	Country
12 points	Greece
10 points	Norway
8 points	Ireland
7 points	Austria
6 points	Germany
5 points	United Kingdom
4 points	France
3 points	Russia
2 points	Malta
1 point	Poland
