= Iceland in the Eurovision Song Contest 1994 =

- Eurovision Song Contest 1994
- Participating broadcaster: Ríkisútvarpið (RÚV)
- Country: Iceland
- Selection process: Song: Söngvakeppni Sjónvarpsins 1994; Artist: Internal selection
- Selection date: 23 February 1994

Competing entry
- Song: "Nætur"
- Artist: Sigga
- Songwriters: Friðrik Karlsson; Stefán Hilmarsson

Placement
- Final result: 12th, 49 points

Participation chronology

Iceland was represented at the Eurovision Song Contest 1994 with the song "Nætur", composed by Friðrik Karlsson, with lyrics by Stefán Hilmarsson, and performed by Sigga. The Icelandic participating broadcaster, Ríkisútvarpið (RÚV), selected its entry through Söngvakeppni Sjónvarpsins 1994 and, subsequently, the performers internally once the national final was over.

== Before Eurovision ==
=== Söngvakeppni Sjónvarpsins 1994 ===
Ríkisútvarpið (RÚV) opted to change the format of the final compared to the previous years due to the high cost of organising a ten-song final and in order to be able to put more effort into the final version of the selected song. RÚV held the national final on 23 February 1994 at its studios in Reykjavík, hosted by Hermann Gunnarsson. Three songs competed, with the winner being selected by an expert jury. Only the winner was announced, which was "Nætur" performed by Sigrún Eva Ármannsdóttir.

Final – 23 February 1994
R/O	Artist	Song
1	Sigrún Eva Ármannsdóttir	"Nætur"
2	Þóranna Jónbjörnsdóttir and Elvar Aðalsteinsson	"Indæla jörð"
3	Anna Mjöll Ólafsdóttir	"Stopp"

=== Artist replacement ===
After the national final, RÚV employees believed that the original arrangement would not fare well at the contest and gave the task of rearranging the song to Frank McNamara, who also decided to select another artist to perform it. This turned out to be Sigga, who had already represented the country twice by that point, in 1990 (as part of Stjórnin) and 1992 (as member of Heart 2 Heart).

== At Eurovision ==
Sigga performed 5th on the night of the contest, held in Dublin, Ireland, following Cyprus and preceding the United Kingdom. She received 49 points for her performance of "Nætur", placing 12th of 25 competing countries. The Icelandic jury awarded its 12 points to contest winners Ireland.

The contest was broadcast on Sjónvarpið and on radio station Rás 2, both with commentary by Jakob Frímann Magnússon.

=== Voting ===
Points awarded to Iceland
Score	Country
12 points	
10 points	
8 points	Sweden
7 points	
6 points	Ireland; Spain; United Kingdom
5 points	
4 points	France; Poland
3 points	Austria; Lithuania; Portugal; Switzerland
2 points	
1 point	Finland; Russia; Slovakia

Points awarded by Iceland
Score	Country
12 points	Ireland
10 points	Hungary
8 points	Portugal
7 points	Germany
6 points	Poland
5 points	France
4 points	Russia
3 points	Cyprus
2 points	Sweden
1 point	Norway
