= Croatia in the Eurovision Song Contest 1994 =

- Eurovision Song Contest 1994
- Participating broadcaster: Croatian Radiotelevision (HRT)
- Country: Croatia
- Selection process: Hrvatski televizijski festival 1994
- Selection date: 20 March 1994

Competing entry
- Song: "Nek' ti bude ljubav sva"
- Artist: Tony Cetinski
- Songwriters: Željen Klašterka; Željko Krznarić

Placement
- Final result: 16th, 27 points

Participation chronology

Croatia was represented at the Eurovision Song Contest 1994 with the song "Nek' ti bude ljubav sva", composed by Željen Klašterka, with lyrics by Željko Krznarić, and performed by Tony Cetinski. The Croatian participating broadcaster, Croatian Radiotelevision (HRT), selected its entry for the contest through Hrvatski televizijski festival 1994.

== Before Eurovision ==
=== Hrvatski televizijski festival 1994 ===
Croatian Radiotelevision (HRT) held Hrvatski televizijski festival 1994 (HTF 1994; retroactively known as Dora 1994) on 20 March 1994 in Opatija to select its entry to the Eurovision Song Contest 1994. The national contest consisted of a televised final with 21 songs held on 20 March 1994 selected from a public call for submissions from songwriters and composers. The winner was chosen by the votes of 11 regional juries.

Final – 20 March 1994
R/O	Artist	Song	Points	Place
1	Valentina Martinčević	"Made in Europe"	1	16
2	Oliver Dragojević	"Arja"	50	4
3	Mladen Grdović	"Život svoj"	9	11
4	Mucalo	"Mala"	0	19
5	Marina Tomašević	"Mama Marina"	3	14
6	Đani Maršan	"Ja te volim"	57	2
7	Gabi Soža	"Tebe nema"	23	9
8	Nino Bosco	"Daj nam ljubavi"	1	16
9	Vinko Coce	"Zlato moje"	34	6
10	Nina Badrić	"Godine nestvarne"	10	10
11	Zorica Kondža	"Ti si moj"	50	4
12	Anđeli	"Sjene u noći"	5	13
13	Neno Belan	"Mama"	3	14
14	Boris Novković	"Emily"	26	7
15	Matteo	"Arrivederci signorina"	57	2
16	Nada Rocco and Branko Blaće	"Živim od ljubavi"	1	16
17	Pero Panjković	"Jedino s tobom"	26	7
18	Romantic	"Miris vremena"	0	19
19	Annamaria	"Na kraj svijeta"	0	19
20	Ivo Amulić	"Vjeruj mi"	7	12
21	Tony Cetinski	"Nek' ti bude ljubav sva"	77	1

Detailed Regional Jury Votes
R/O	Song	Zadar	Rijeka	Pazin	Šibenik	Osijek	Vinkovci	Split	Dubrovnik	Zagreb	Bjelovar	Čakovec	Total
1	"Made in Europe"		1										1
2	"Arja"	2		2	1	7	10	12	10	5	1		50
3	"Život svoj"	7					1			1			9
4	"Mala"												0
5	"Mama Marina"	3											3
6	"Ja te volim"	12	12	1	2	2	5	1	2	10	5	5	57
7	"Tebe nema"				7			2			2	12	23
8	"Daj nam ljubavi"											1	1
9	"Zlato moje"	1				10	3	10	7	3			34
10	"Godine nestvarne"				3			7					10
11	"Ti si moj"	10	7	5	12			3	3	7	3		50
12	"Sjene u noći"					5							5
13	"Mama"		3										3
14	"Emily"		2	3			7				7	7	26
15	"Arrivederci signorina"		5	10		3	12		5		12	10	57
16	"Živim od ljubavi"					1							1
17	"Jedino s tobom"			7				5	12	2			26
18	"Miris vremena"												0
19	"Na kraj svijeta"												0
20	"Vjeruj mi"				5							2	7
21	"Nek' ti bude ljubav sva"	5	10	12	10	12	2		1	12	10	3	77

== At Eurovision ==
Tony Cetinski competed for Croatia the Eurovision contest on 30 April 1994 in Dublin, and finished 16th out of 25 countries, with 27 points.

The contest was broadcast on HRT 1, with commentary by Aleksandar Kostadinov.

=== Voting ===
Points awarded to Croatia
Score	Country
12 points	Slovakia
10 points	Malta
8 points	
7 points	
6 points	
5 points	Greece
4 points	
3 points	
2 points	
1 point	

Points awarded by Croatia
Score	Country
12 points	Ireland
10 points	Germany
8 points	Poland
7 points	Malta
6 points	United Kingdom
5 points	Hungary
4 points	Bosnia and Herzegovina
3 points	Norway
2 points	Austria
1 point	Russia
