= Edo Mulahalilović =

Edo Mulahalilović (Serbo-Croatian Cyrillic: Едо Мулахалиловић; 23 March 1964 – 27 June 2010) was a Bosnian songwriter and producer.

He was born in Sarajevo and died in Belgrade in 2010 after a long battle with cancer.

- 1983: Edo together with Zoran Kesić (keyboards), Pjer Žalica (bass player and film director) and Izudin Kolečić (drummer) founded the band called Baobab (Edo was guitar player and singer).
- 1985: The four musicians together with singer Hajrudin Varešanović formed the band Hari Mata Hari, which became one of the most popular pop bands in former Yugoslavia.
- 1991: Edo released a solo album “Jedna je pjesma cijeloga života” but the war in ex-Yugoslavia stopped the tour and promotion.
- 1994: For the Eurovision song contest in Dublin, Edo wrote a song “Ostani kraj mene” ("Stay with me”) in cooperation with his brother Adi, to represent Bosnia and Herzegovina.
- 1996-2002: Edo worked in Finland as composer and producer with many Scandinavian artists.
