= List of gay, lesbian or bisexual people: H =

This is a partial list of notable people who were or are gay men, lesbian or bisexual.

The historical concept and definition of sexual orientation varies and has changed greatly over time; for example the general term "gay" wasn't used to describe sexual orientation until the mid 20th century. A number of different classification schemes have been used to describe sexual orientation since the mid-19th century, and scholars have often defined the term "sexual orientation" in divergent ways. Indeed, several studies have found that much of the research about sexual orientation has failed to define the term at all, making it difficult to reconcile the results of different studies. However, most definitions include a psychological component (such as the direction of an individual's erotic desire) and/or a behavioural component (which focuses on the sex of the individual's sexual partner/s). Some prefer to simply follow an individual's self-definition or identity.

The high prevalence of people from the West on this list may be due to societal attitudes towards homosexuality. The Pew Research Center's 2013 Global Attitudes Survey found that there is "greater acceptance in more secular and affluent countries," with "publics in 39 countries [having] broad acceptance of homosexuality in North America, the European Union, and much of Latin America, but equally widespread rejection in predominantly Muslim nations and in Africa, as well as in parts of Asia and in Russia. Opinion about the acceptability of homosexuality is divided in Israel, Poland and Bolivia." As of 2013, Americans are divided – a majority (60 percent) believes homosexuality should be accepted, while 33 percent disagree.

A · Ba–Bh · Bi–Bz · C · D · E · F · G · H · I · J · K · L · M · N · O
P · Q · R · Sa–Sc · Sd–Si · Sj–Sz · T · U · V · W · X · Y · Z

== H ==
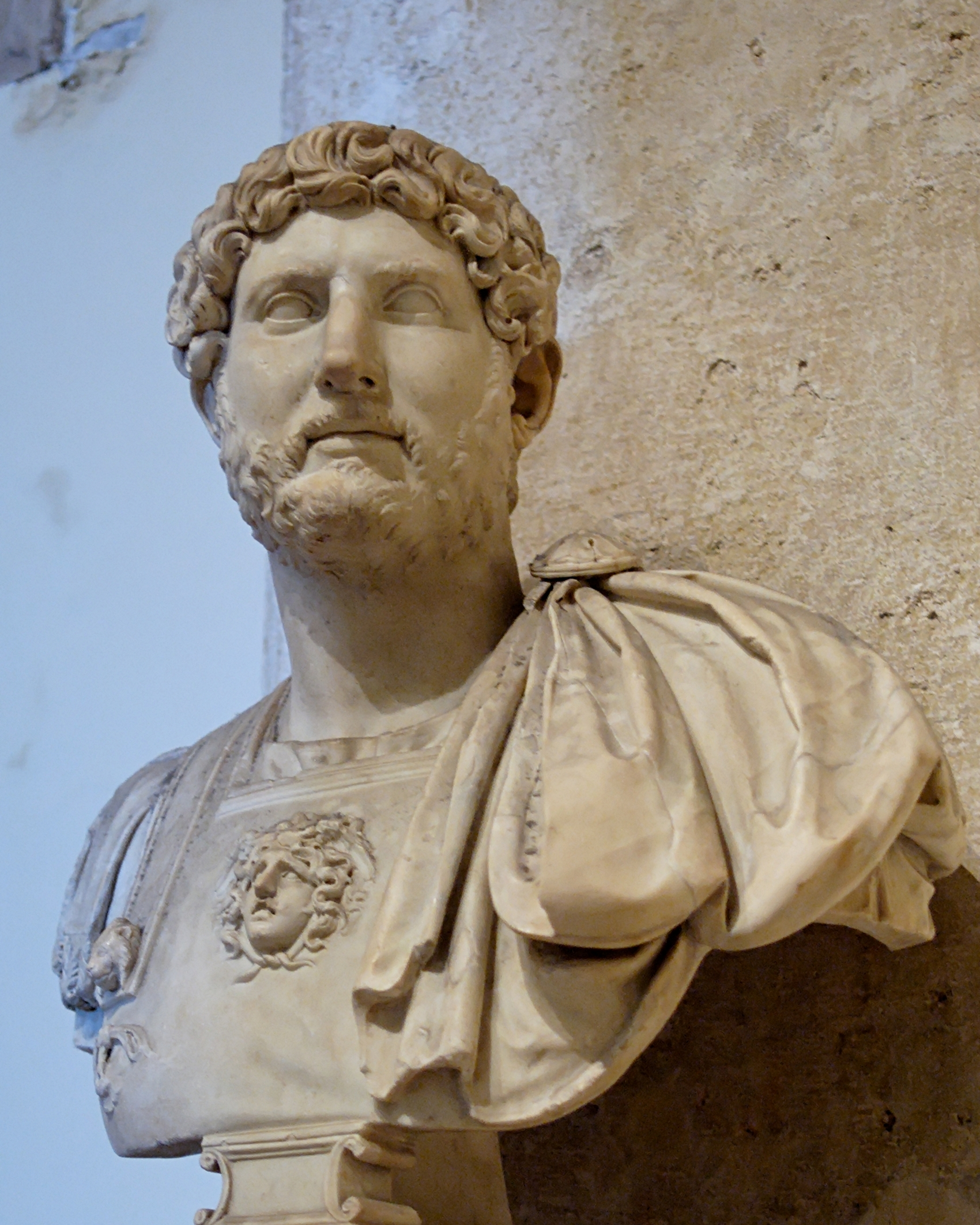
Roman emperor Hadrian

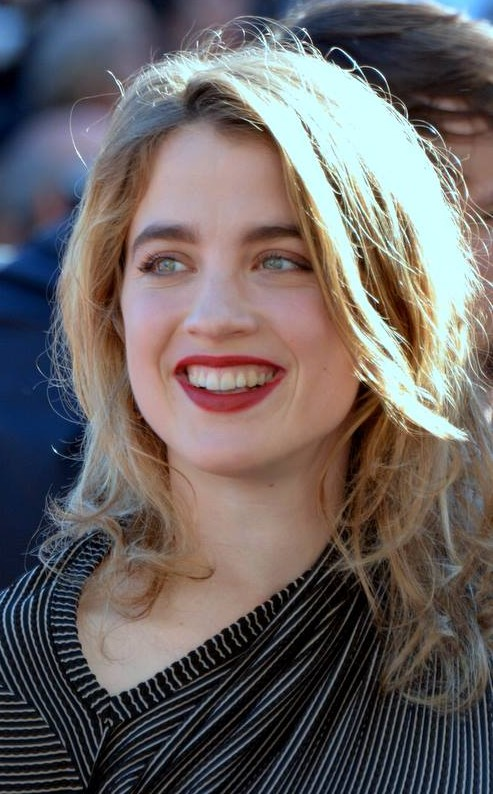
Actress Adèle Haenel

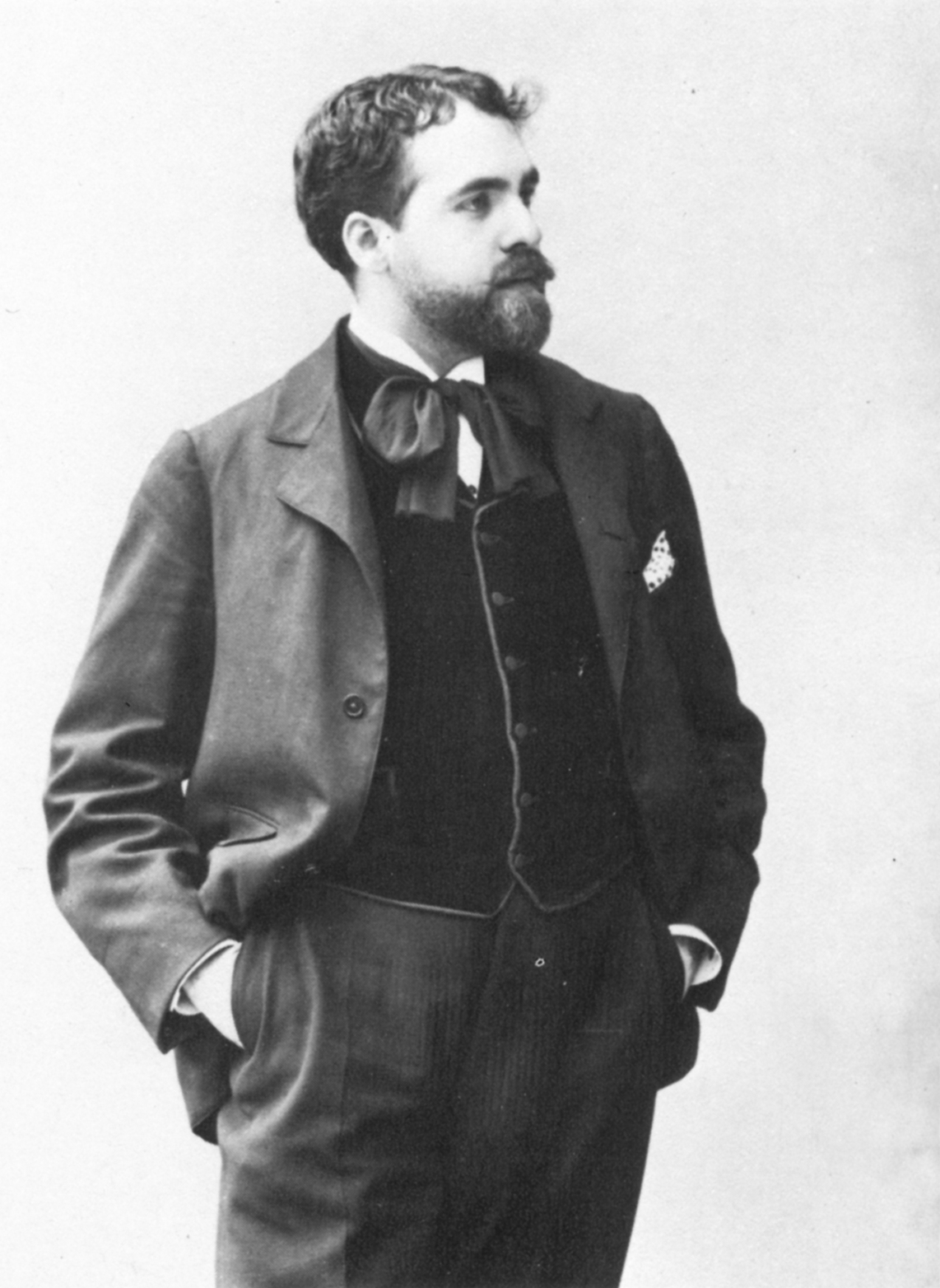
Classical music conductor, composer and music critic Reynaldo Hahn

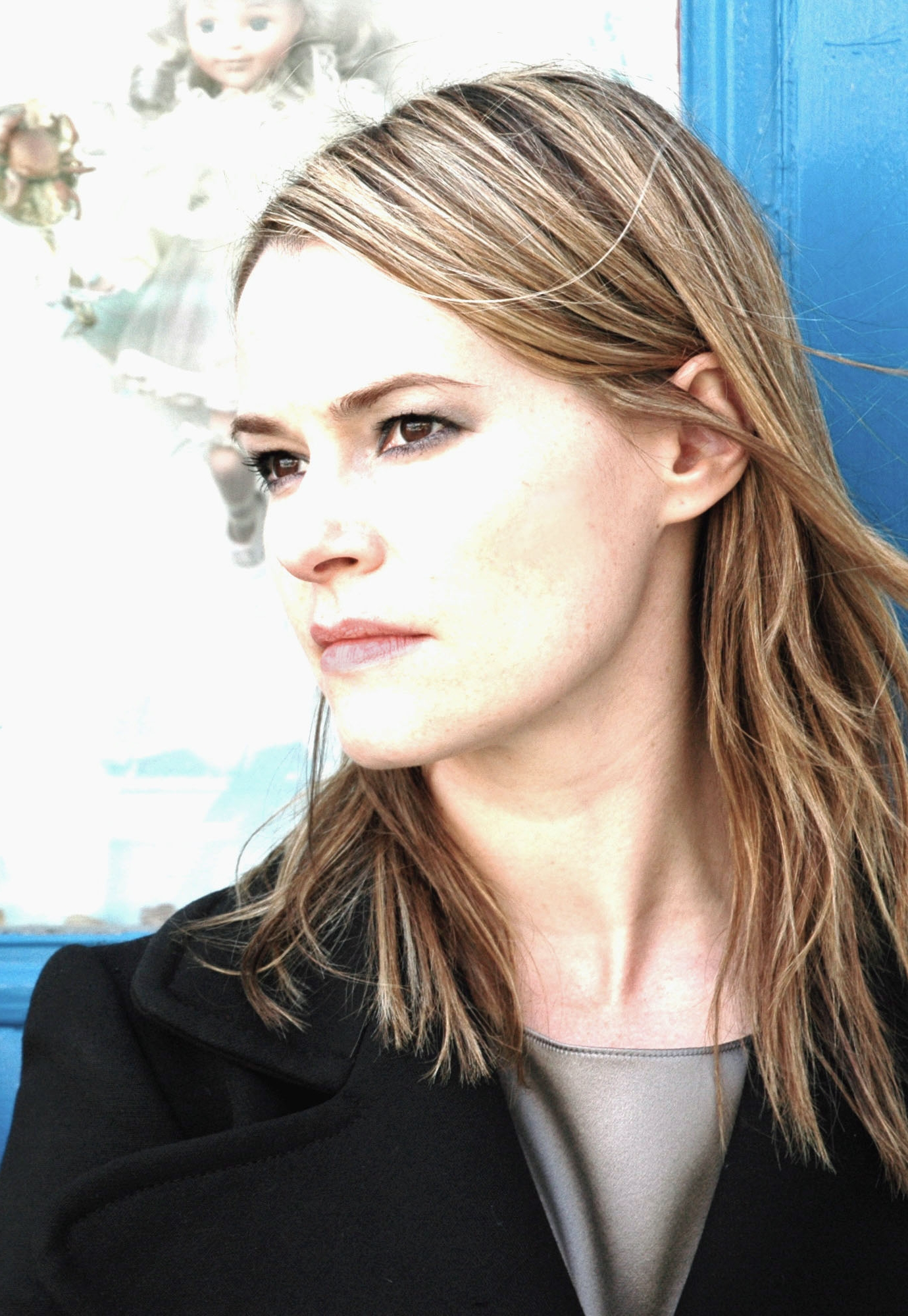
Actress and rock musician Leisha Hailey

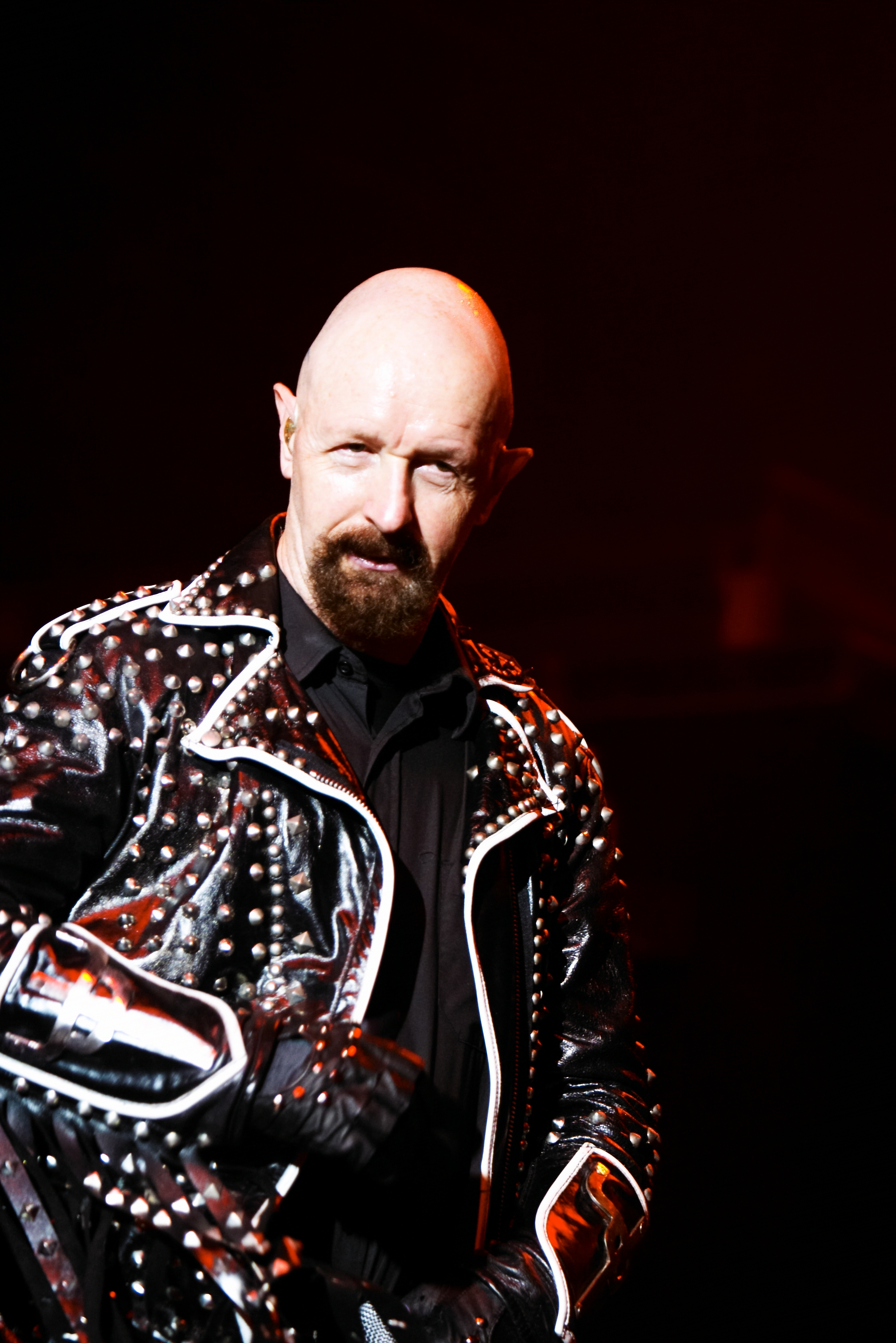
Heavy metal singer Rob Halford

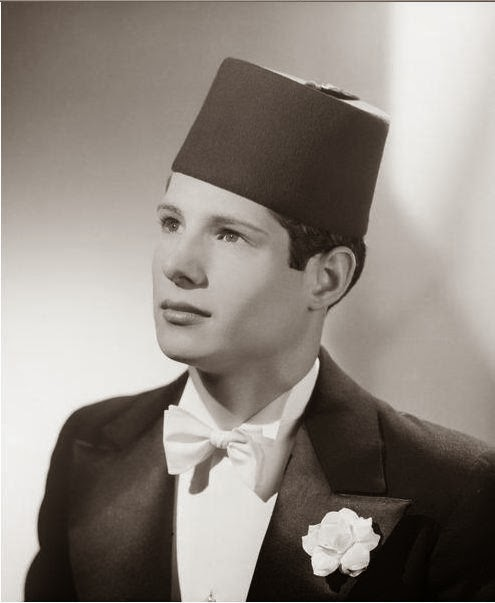
Singer Salim Halali

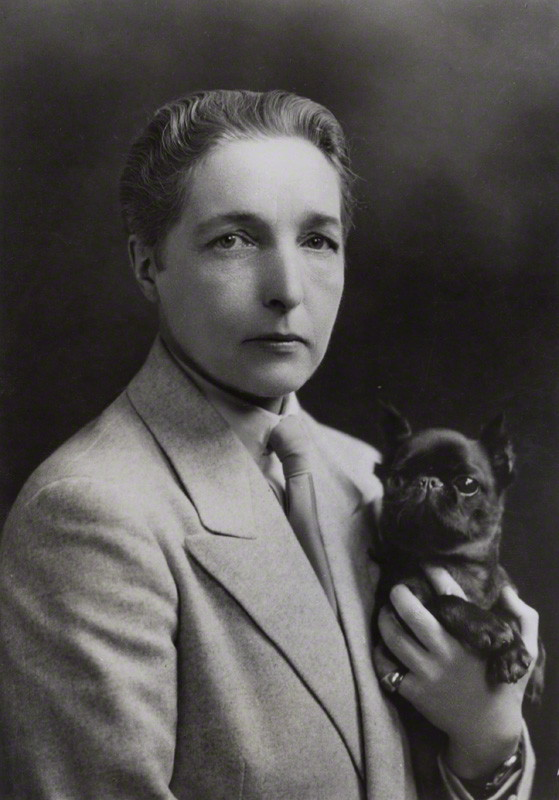
Author Radclyffe Hall

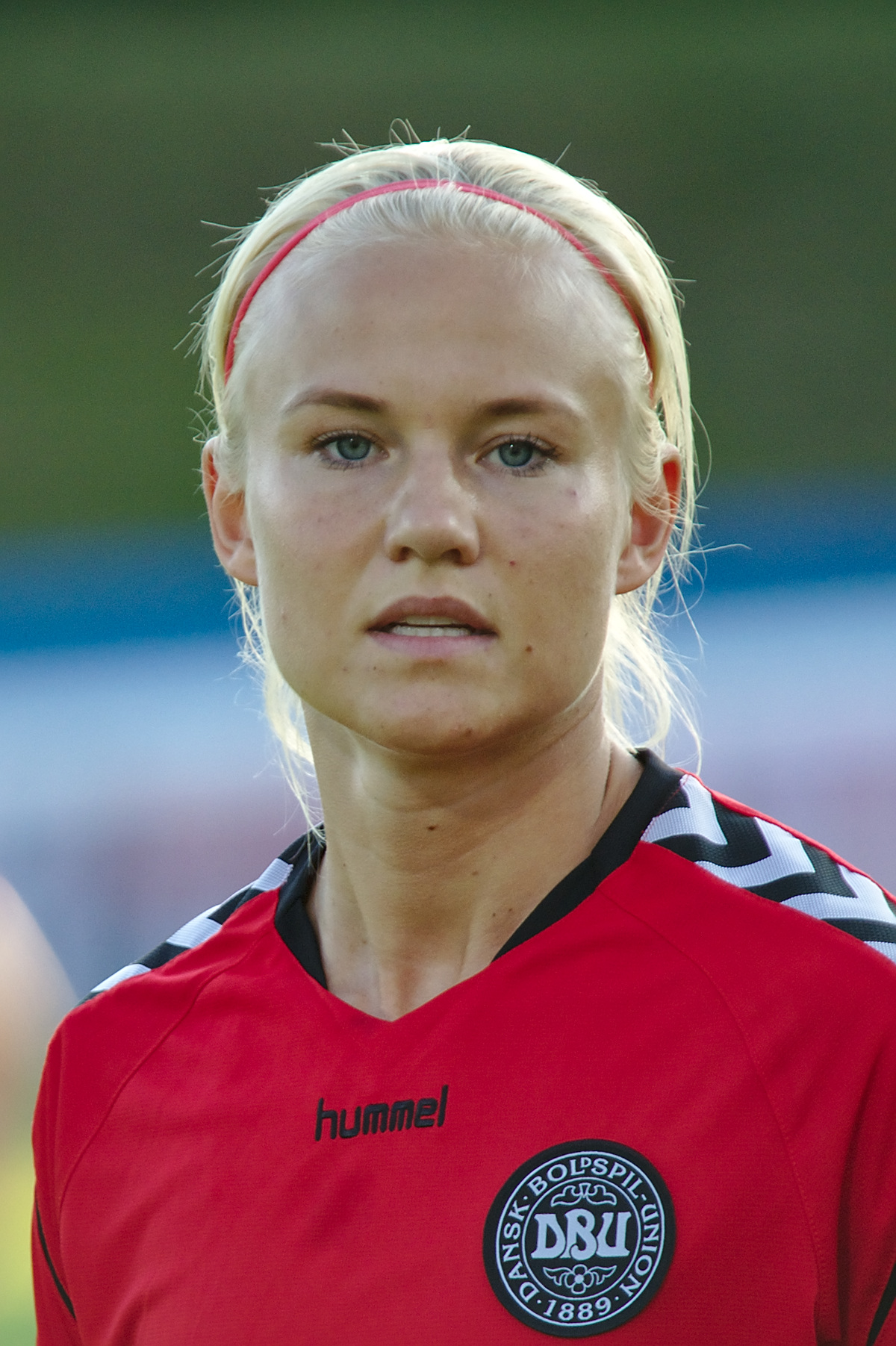
Footballer Pernille Harder

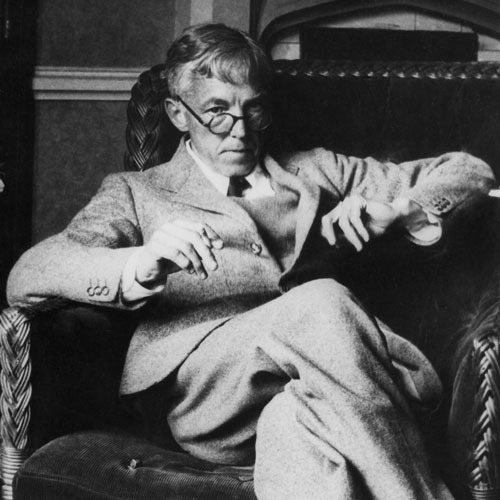
Mathematician G. H. Hardy

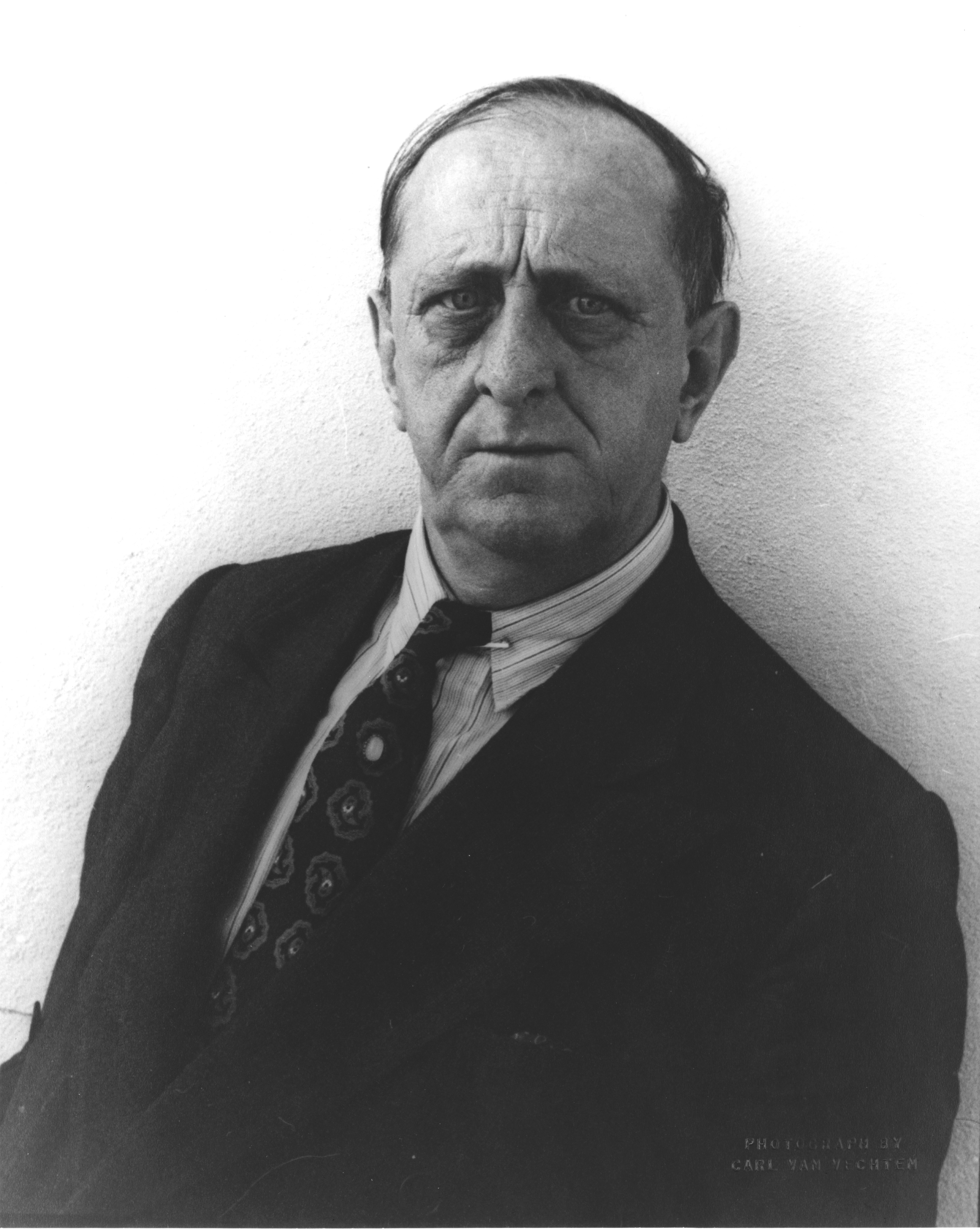
Painter and poet Marsden Hartley

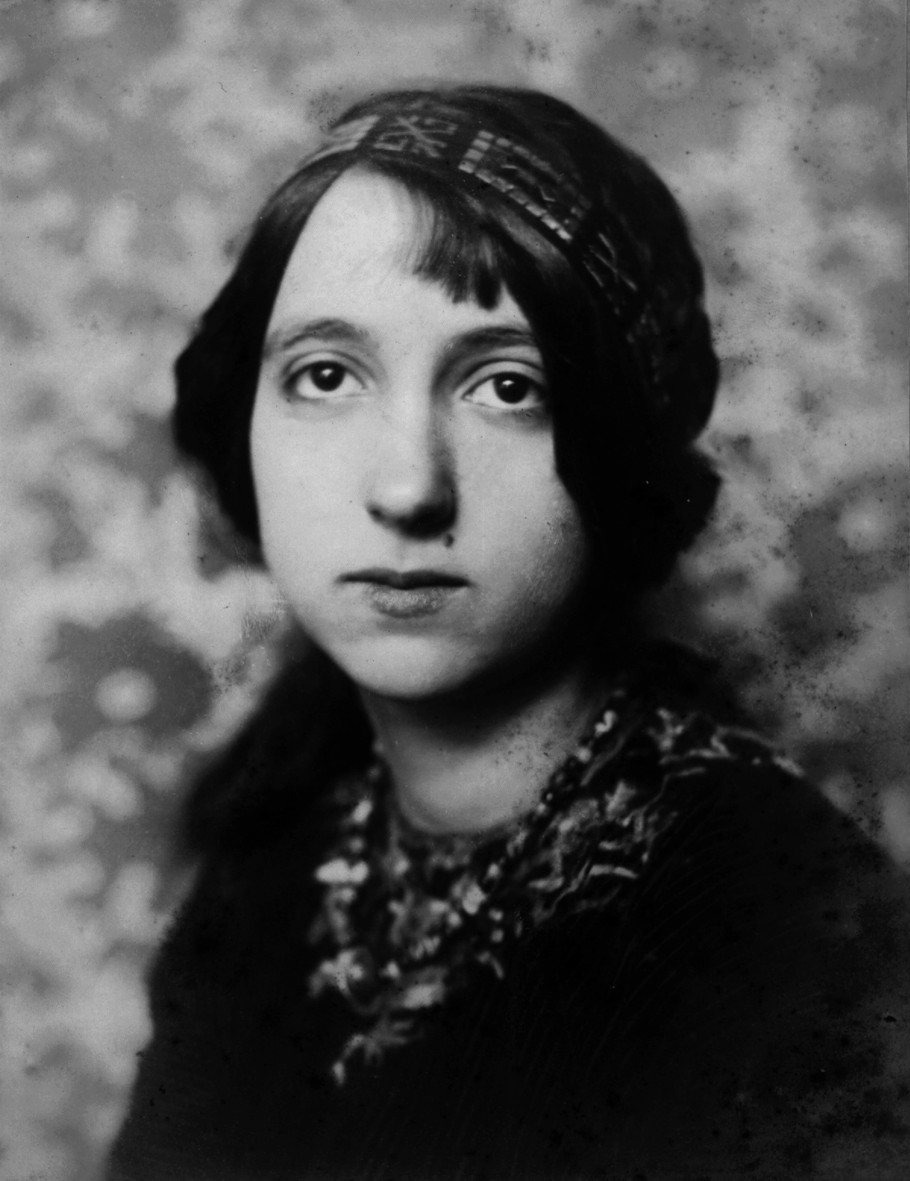
Poet, lyricist and diarist Mireille Havet

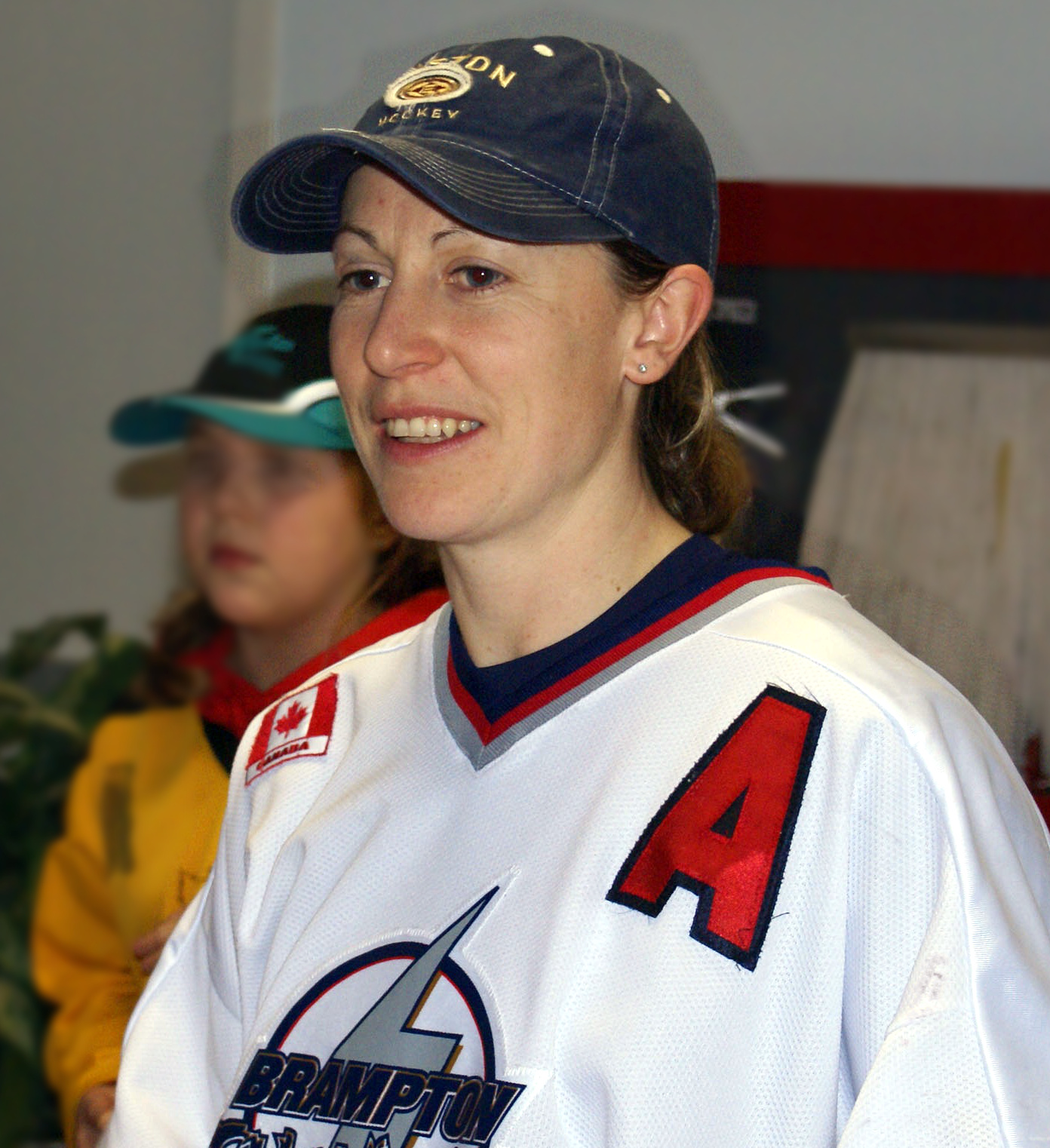
Ice hockey player Jayna Hefford

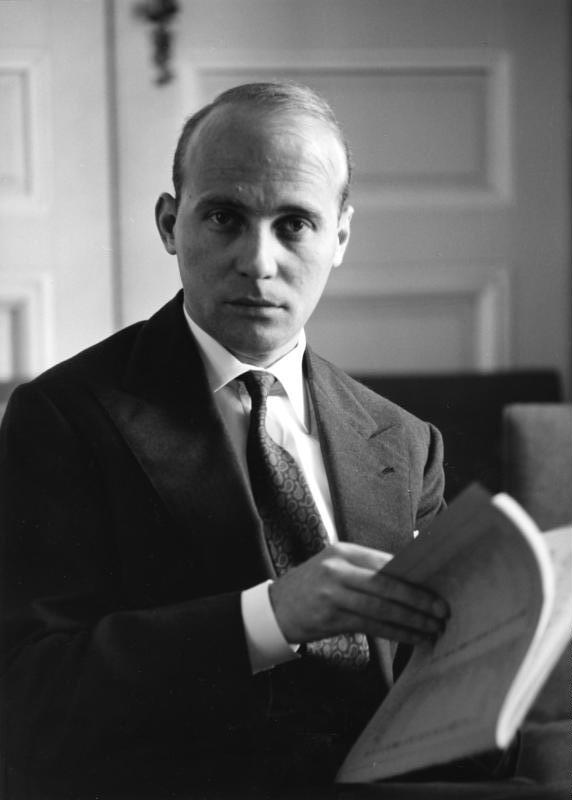
Composer Hans Werner Henze

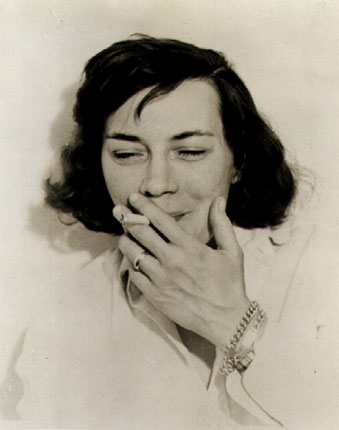
Author Patricia Highsmith

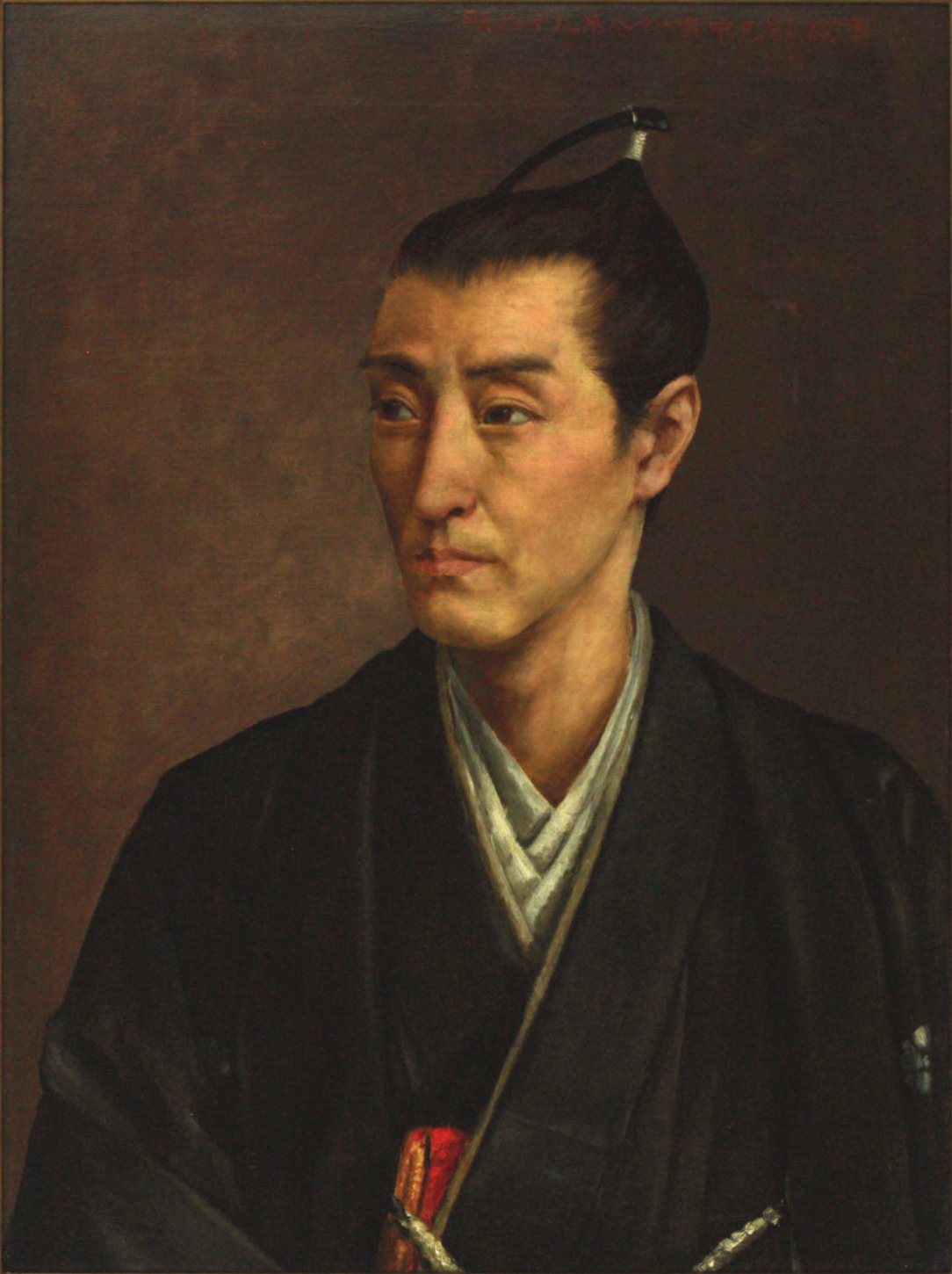
Polymath, inventor, writer, and samurai Hiraga Gennai

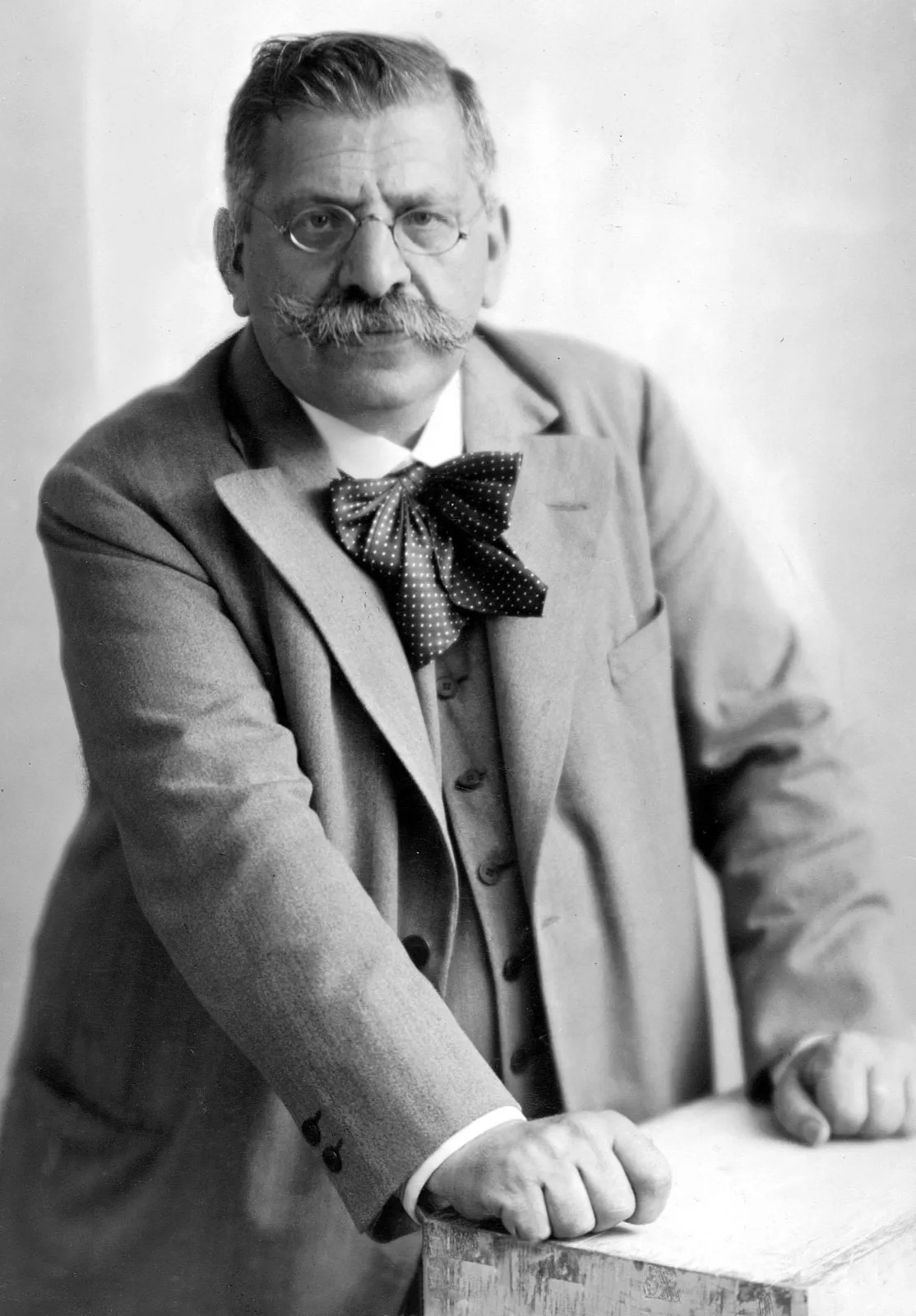
Sexologist and sexual minorities advocate Magnus Hirschfeld

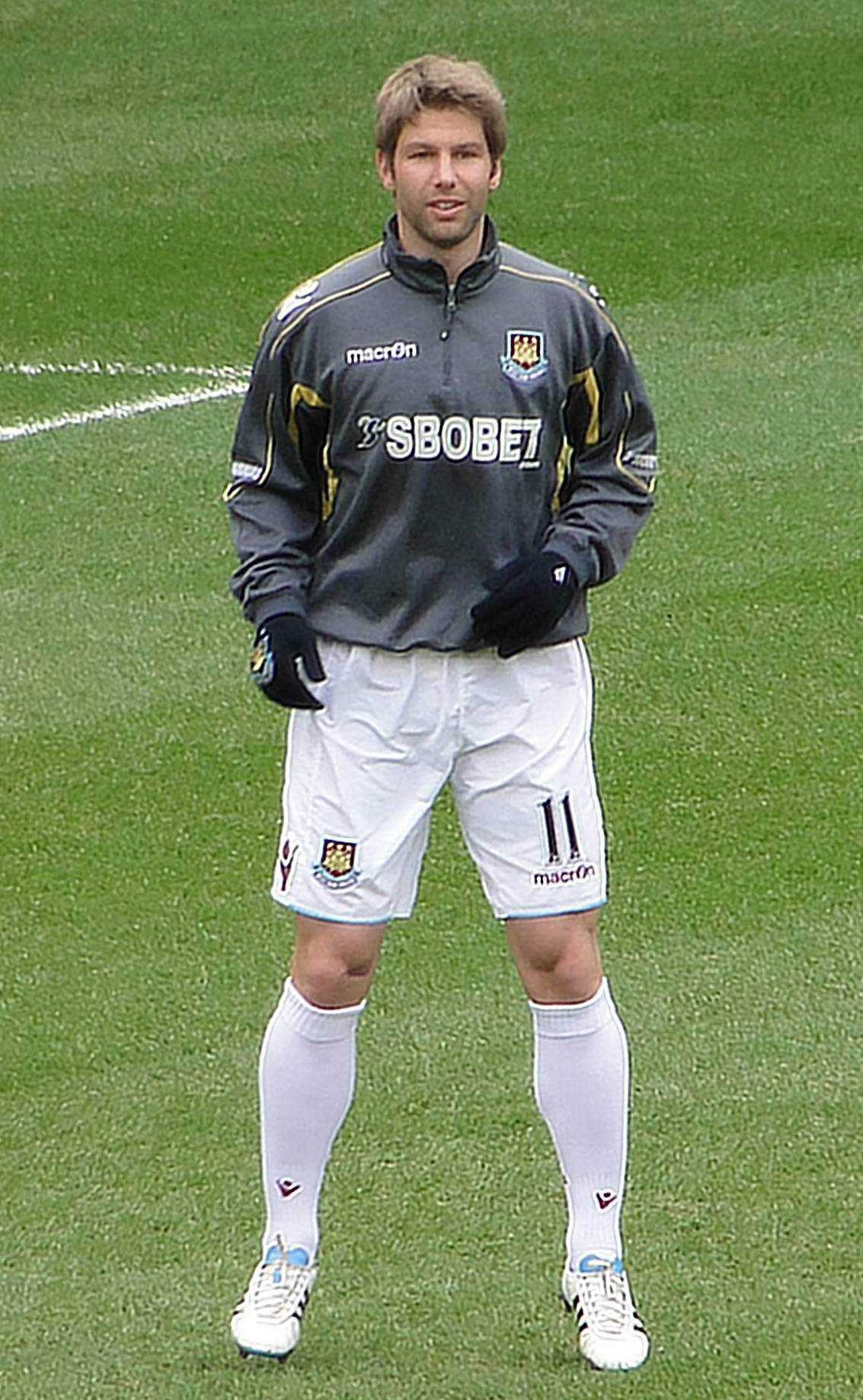
Footballer Thomas Hitzlsperger

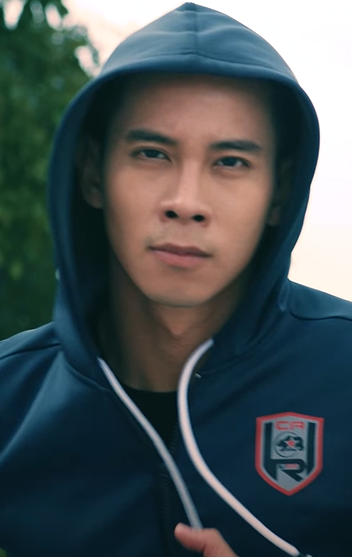
Actor and model Hồ Vĩnh Khoa

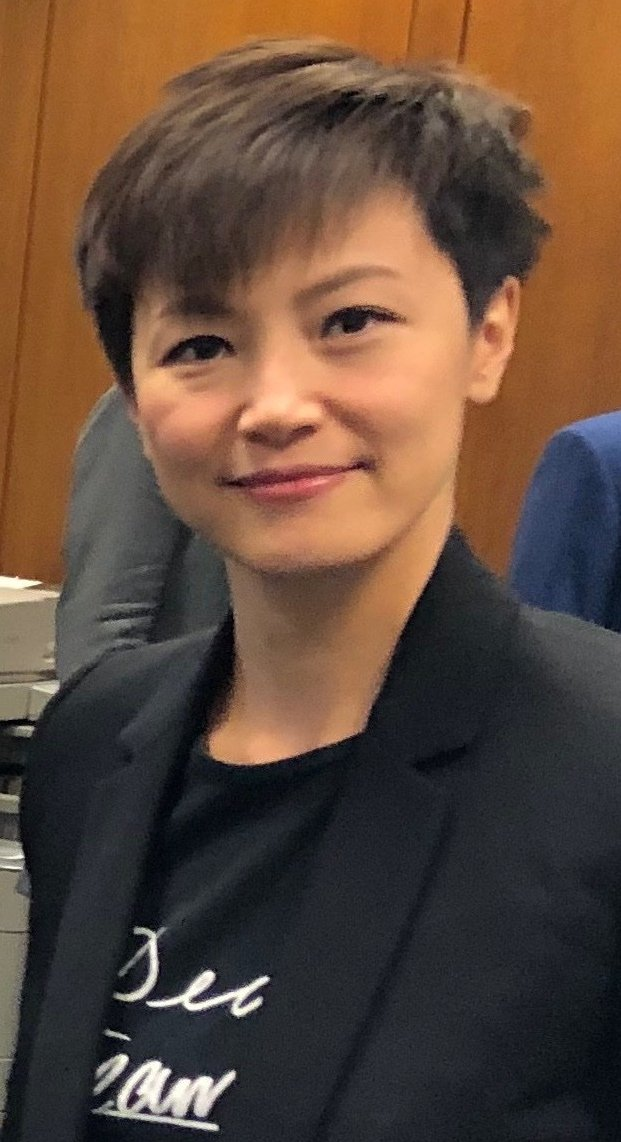
Singer and activist Denise Ho

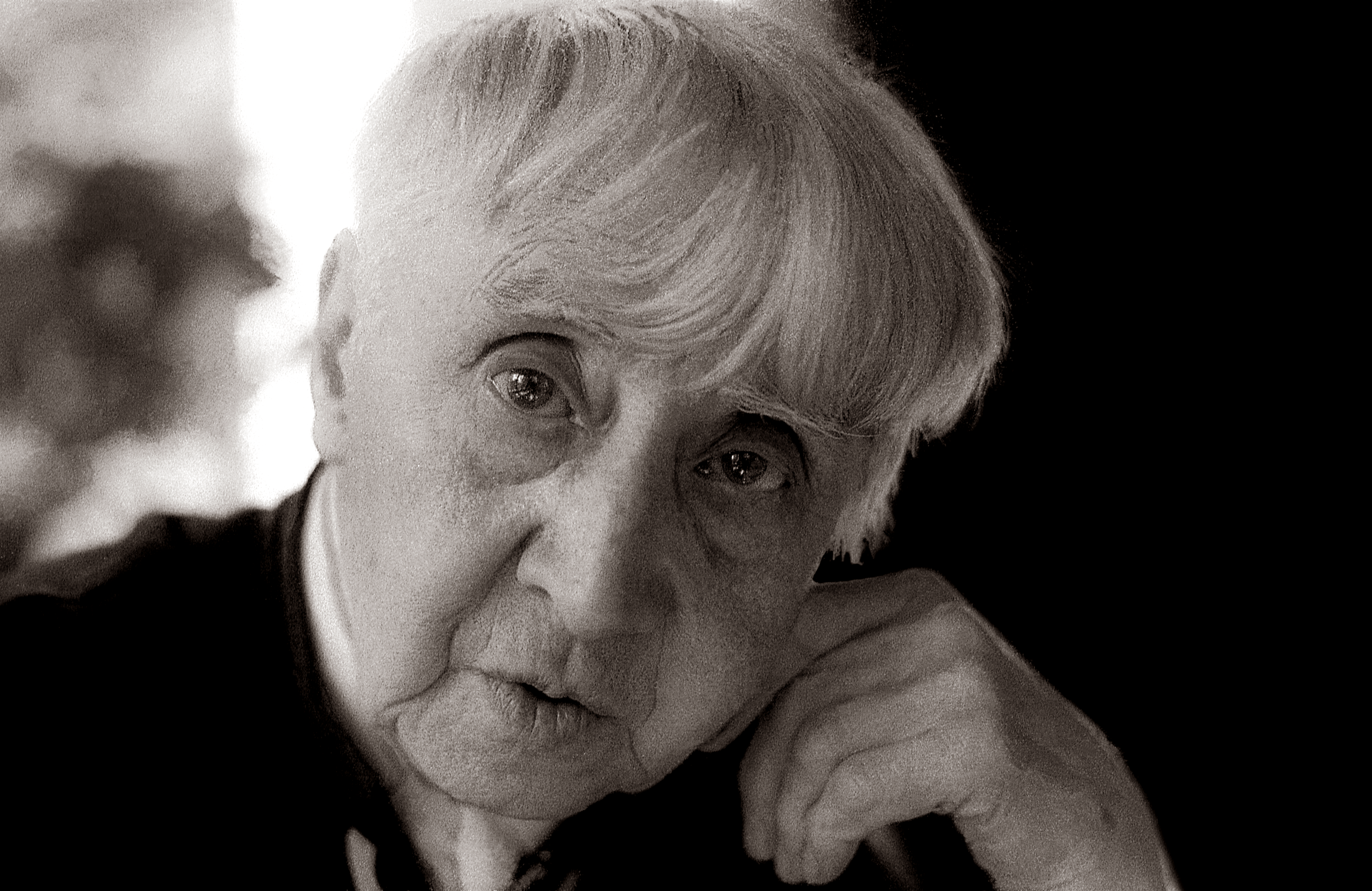
Artist Hannah Höch

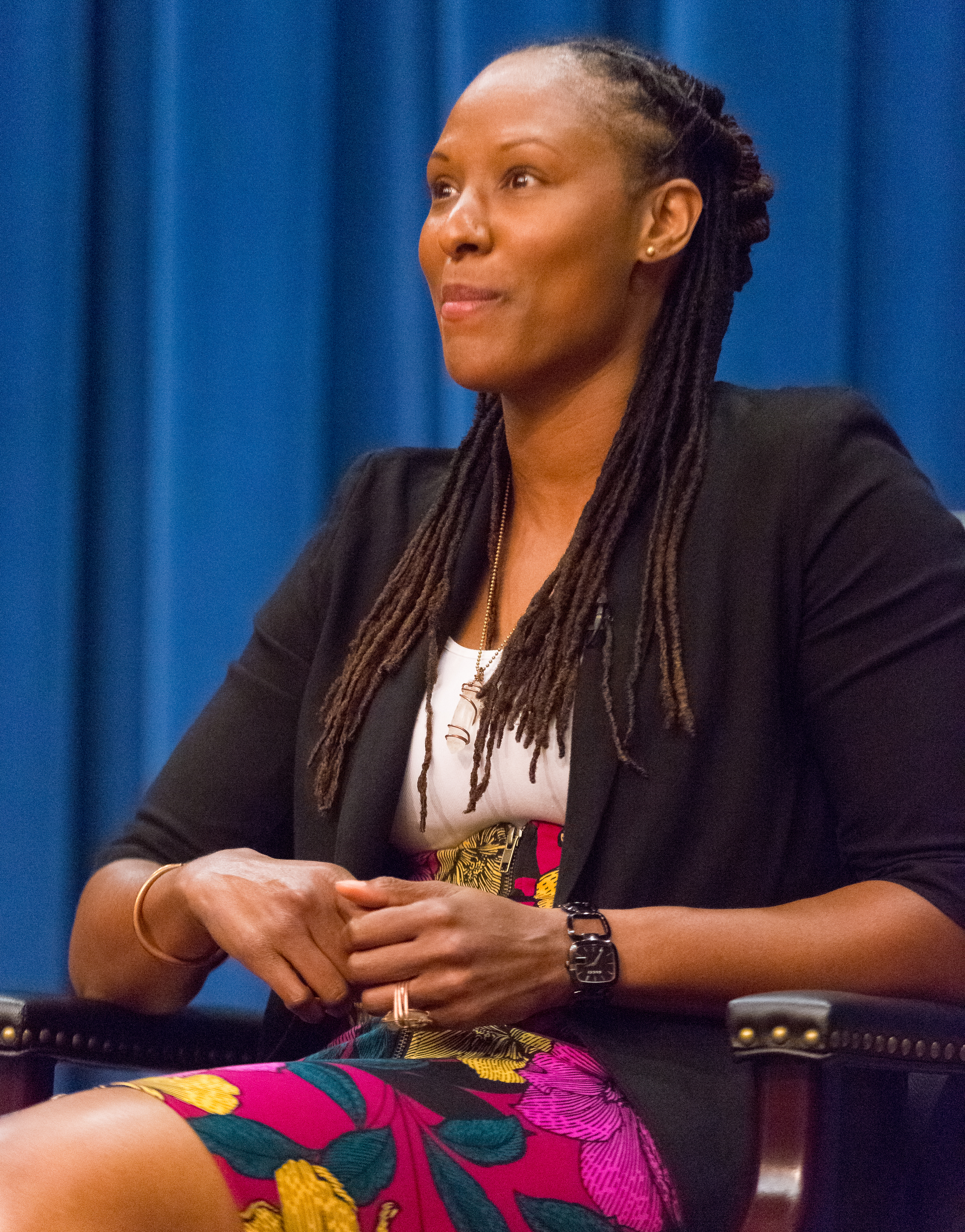
Basketball player Chamique Holdsclaw

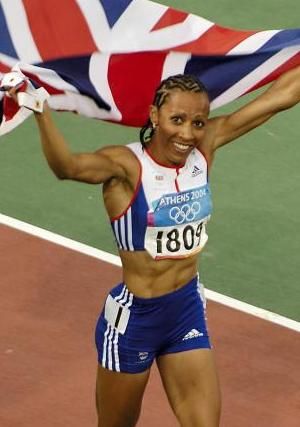
Middle-distance runner Kelly Holmes

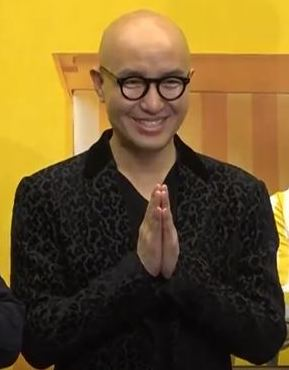
Actor, restaurateur and politician Hong Seok-cheon

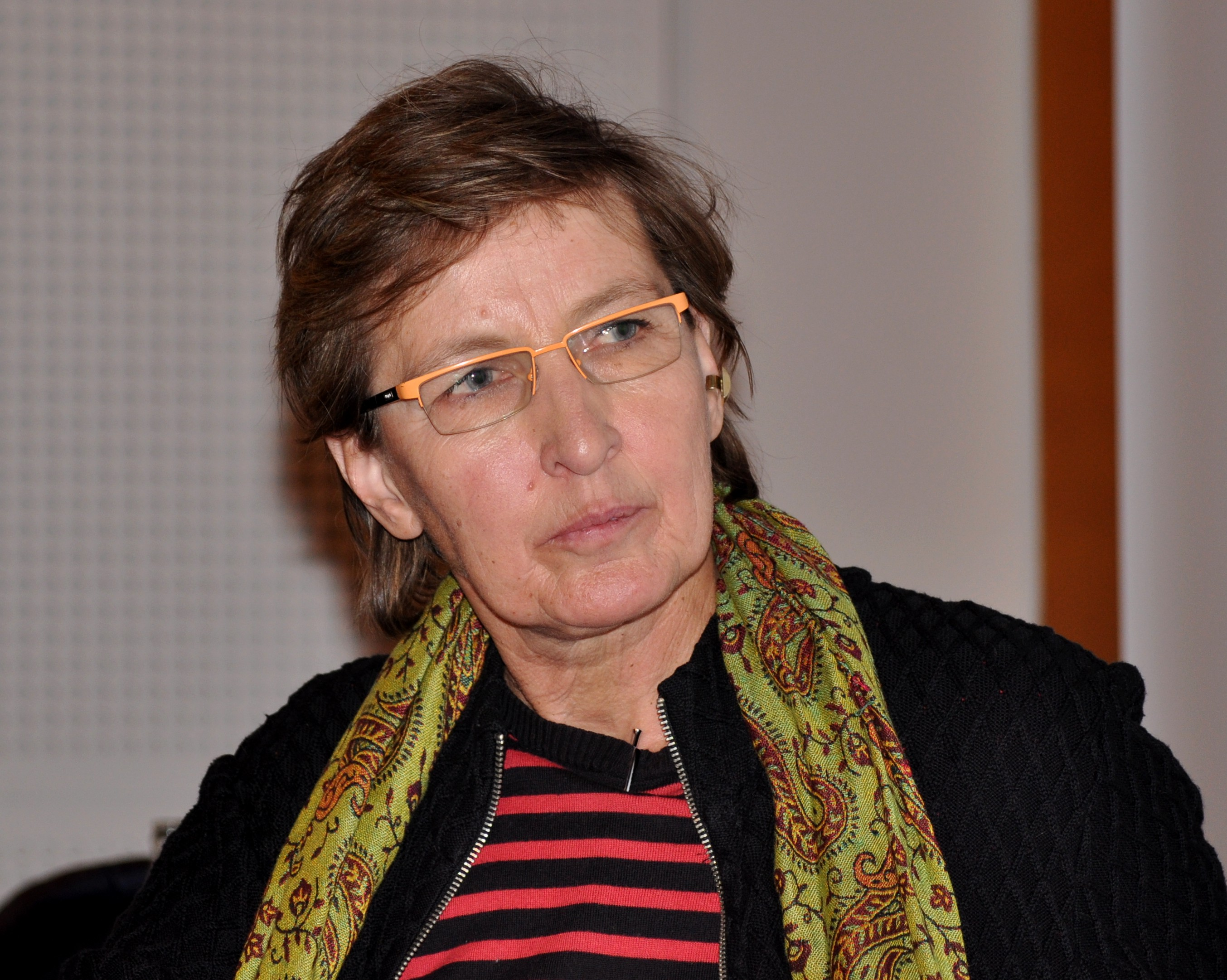
Filmmaker Pirjo Honkasalo

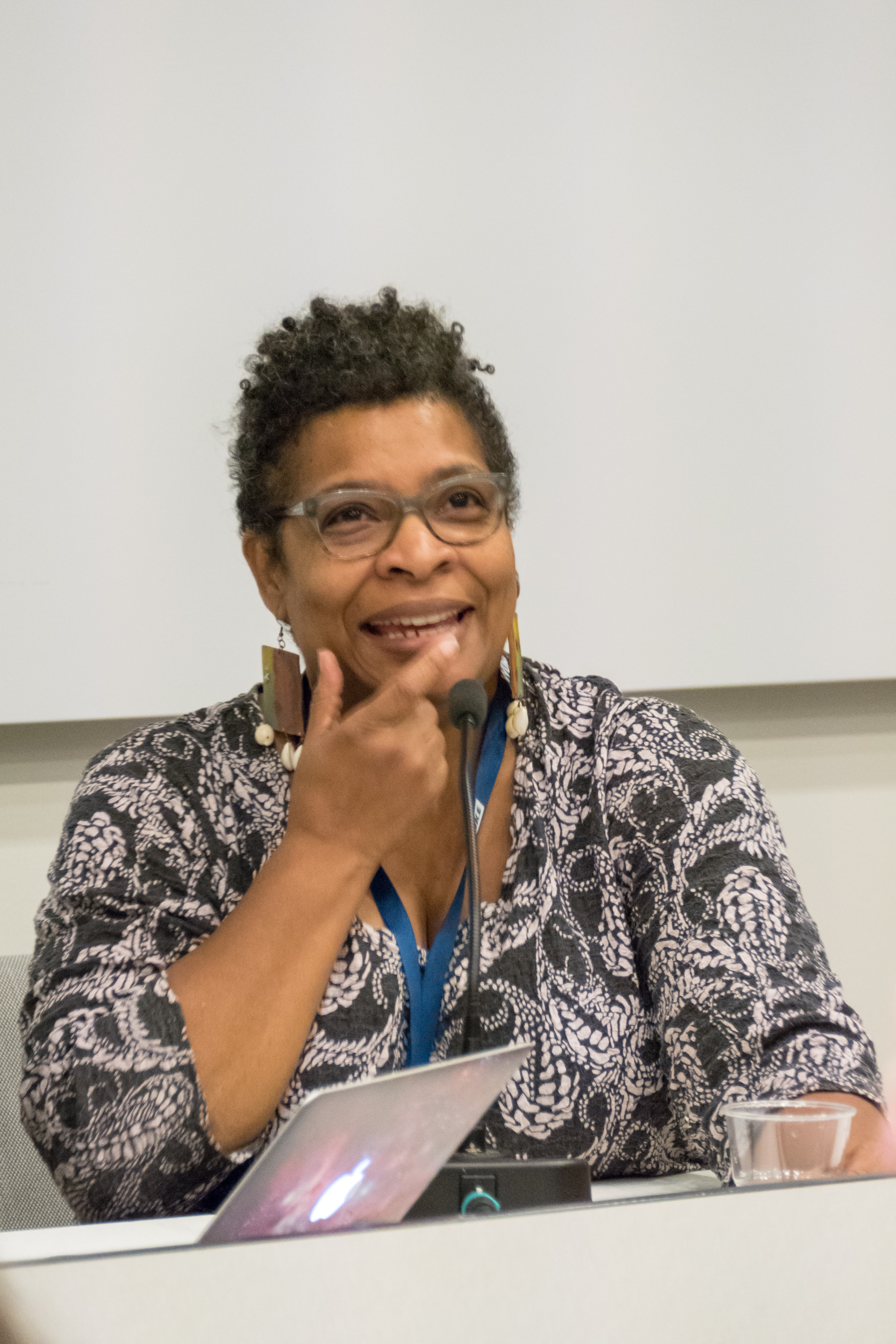
Author Nalo Hopkinson

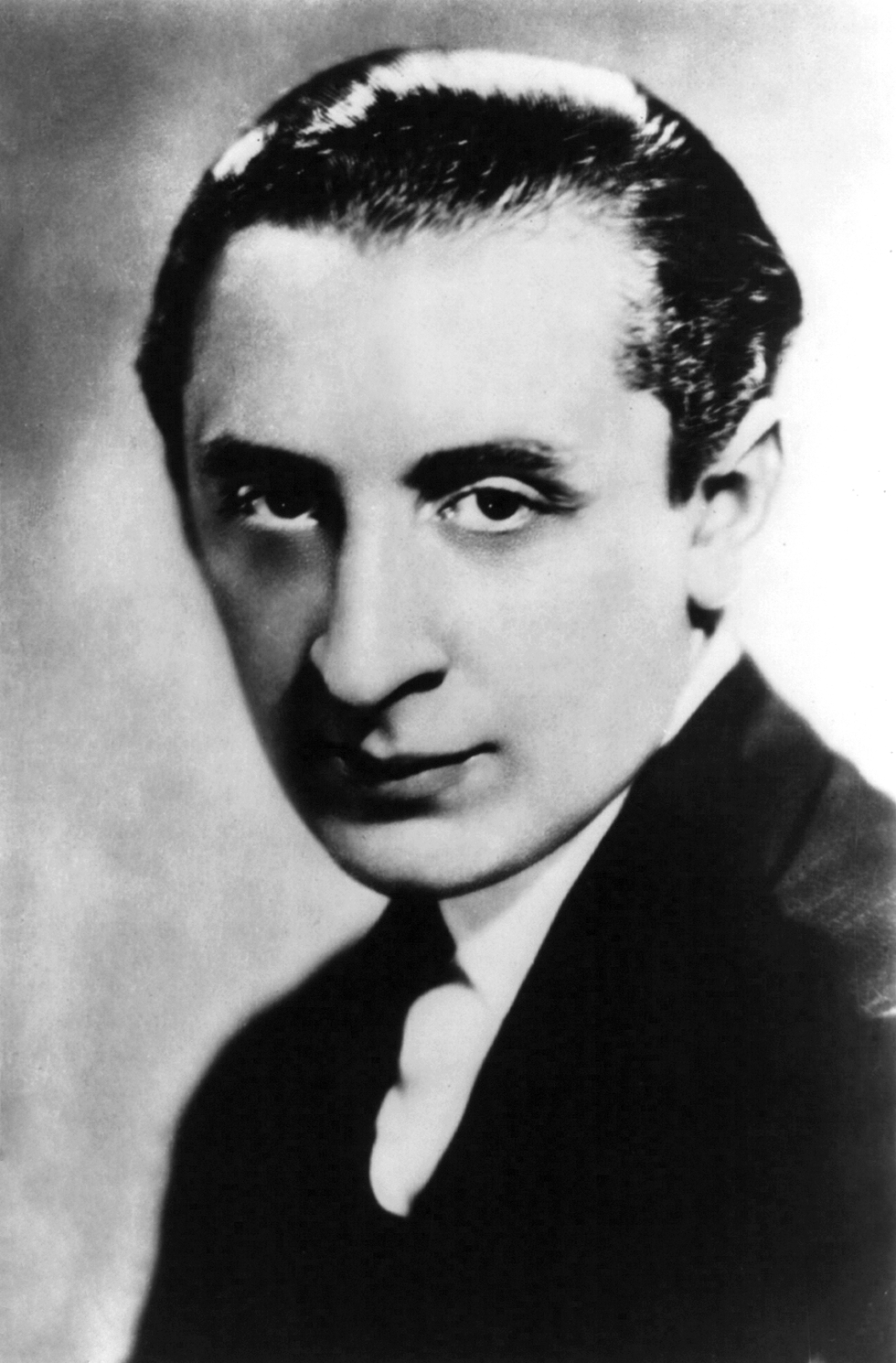
Pianist Vladimir Horowitz

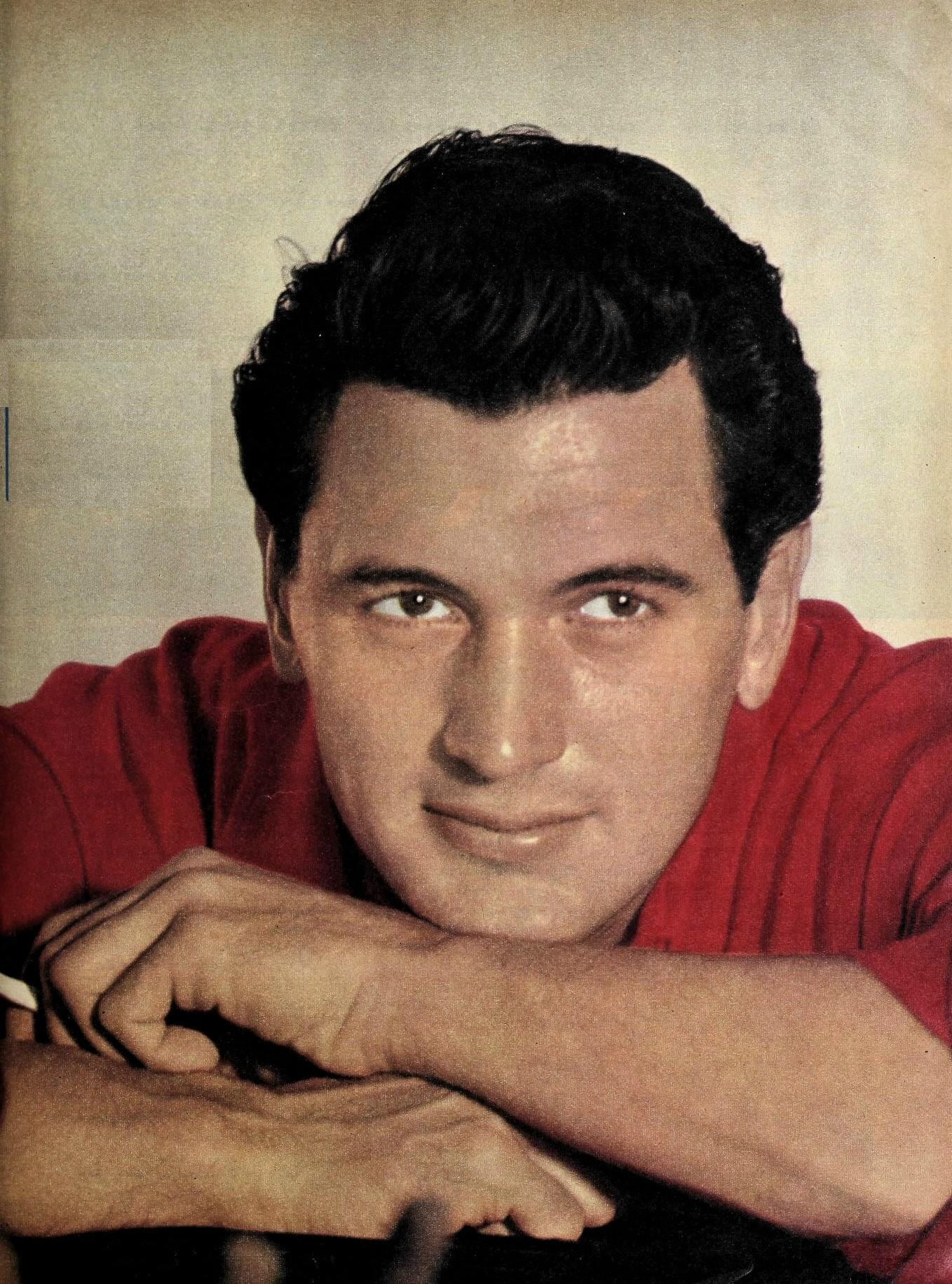
Actor Rock Hudson

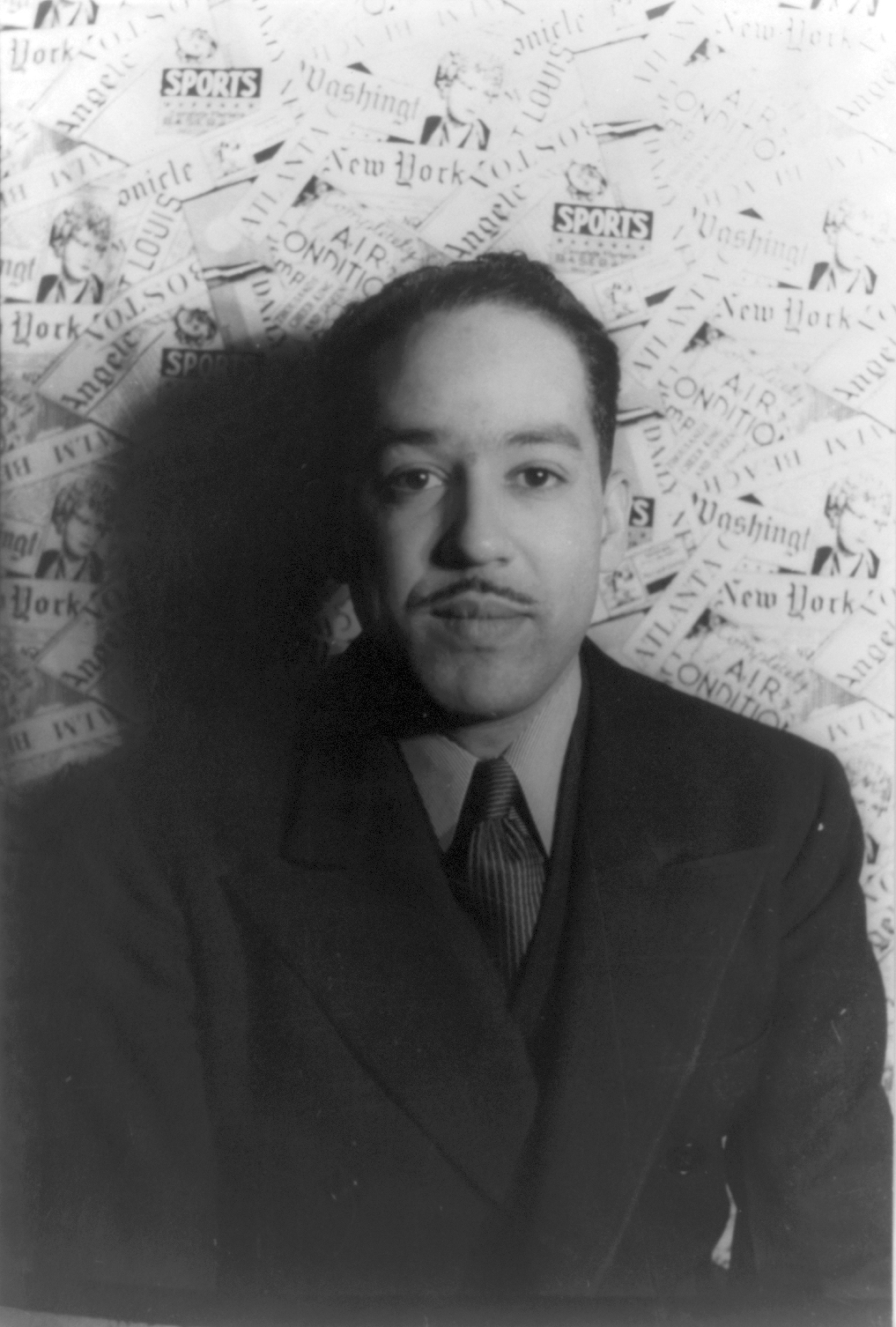
Writer and social activist Langston Hughes

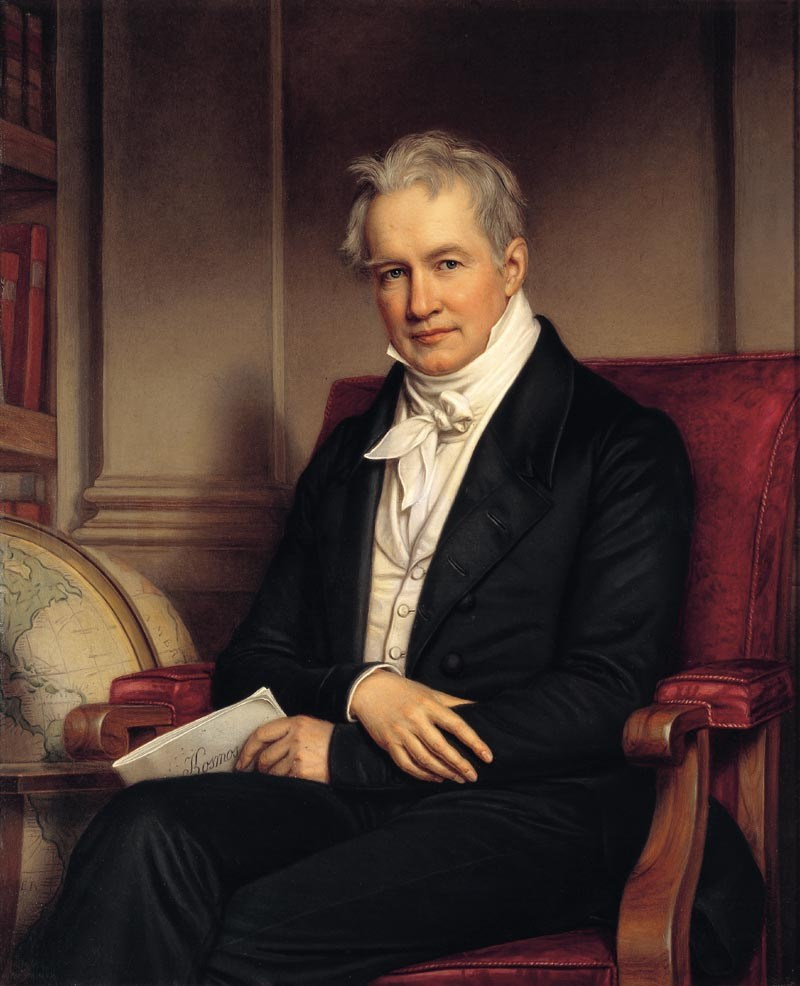
Polymath, geographer, naturalist, explorer, and proponent of Romantic philosophy and science Alexander von Humboldt

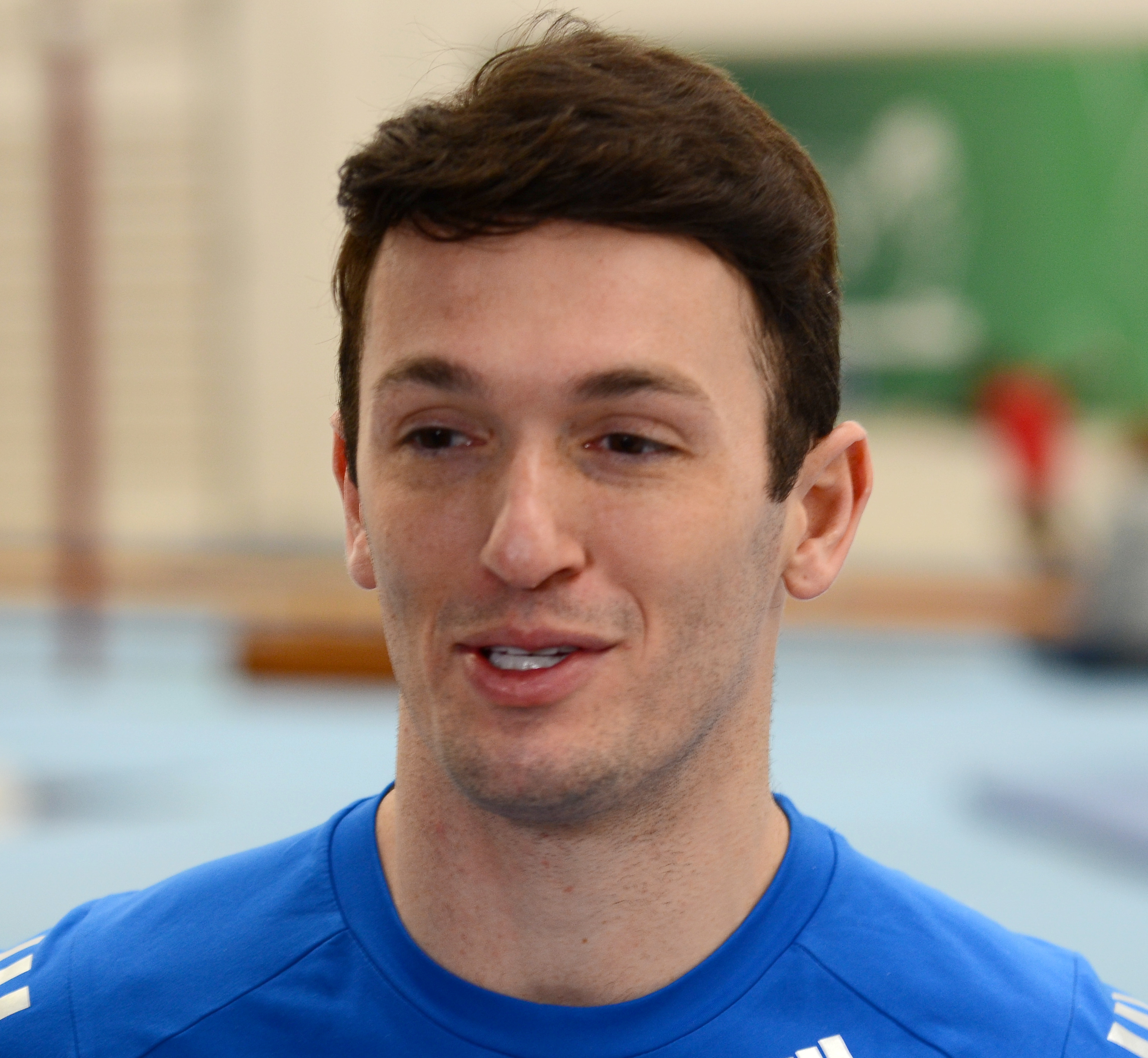
Gymnast Diego Hypólito

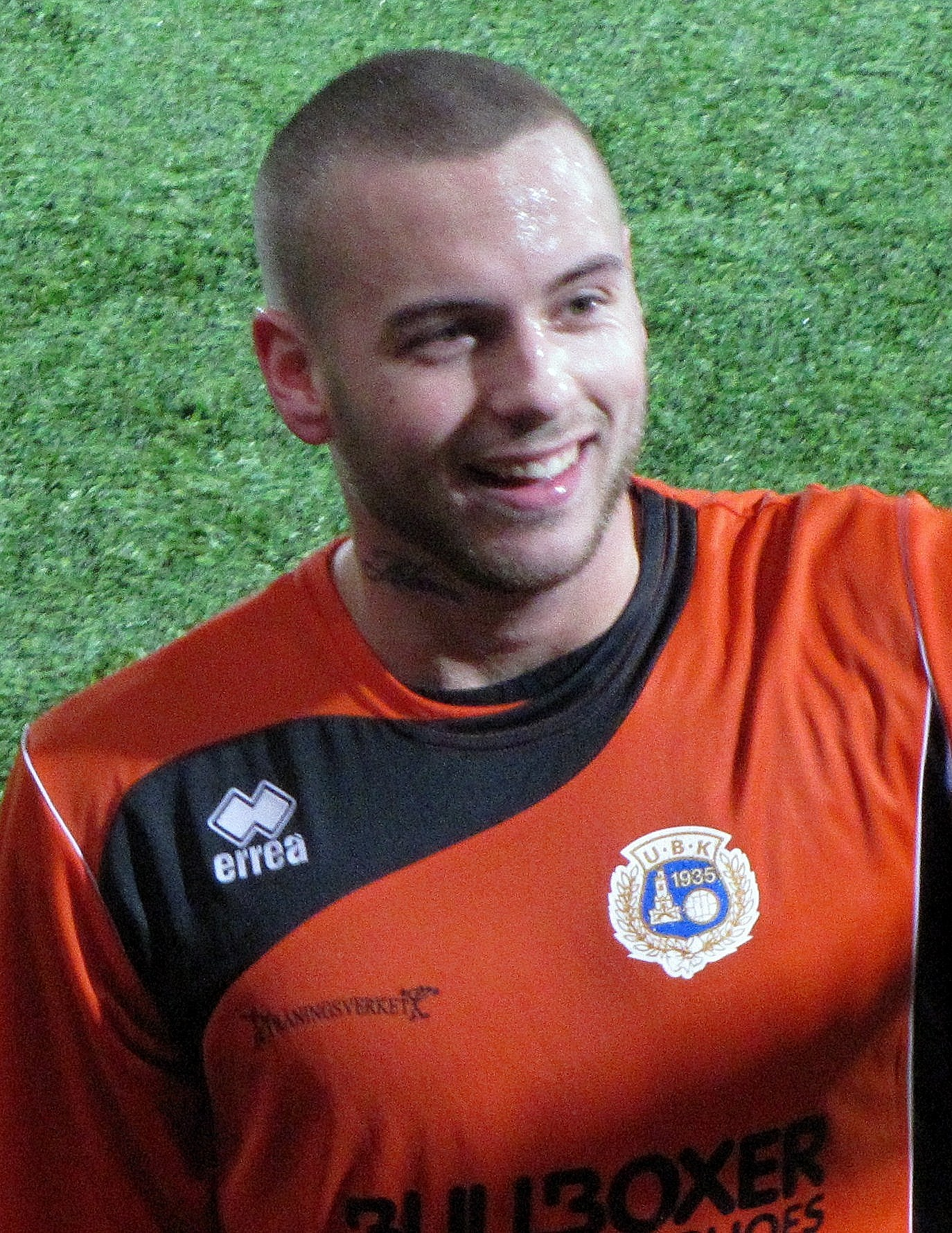
Footballer Anton Hysén

Name	Lifetime	Nationality	Notable as	Notes
Jacob Israël de Haan	1881–1924	Dutch	Journalist, writer	G
Minna Haapkylä	b. 1973	Finnish	Actor	B
Fritz Haarmann	1879–1925	German	Serial killer	G
Pekka Haavisto	b. 1958	Finnish	Politician	G
Conner Habib	b. 1977	American	Writer, podcaster, academic, activist, former pornographic actor	G
Marilyn Hacker	b. 1942	American	Poet	L
Saleem Haddad	b. 1983	Kuwaiti-British	Author, aid worker	G
Boze Hadleigh	b. 1954	American	Writer	G
Hadrian	76–138 CE	Roman	Military commander, emperor	G
Adèle Haenel	b. 1989	French	Actor	L
Jenny Hagel	b. ?	American	Comedian, comedy writer	L
Sofie Hagen	b. 1988	Danish	Comedian	B
Stein Erik Hagen	b. 1956	Norwegian	Businessperson	B
Tom Harald Hagen	b. 1978	Norwegian	Football referee	G
Ted Haggard	b. 1956	American	Minister	B
Patrick Haggerty	1944–2022	American	Country music singer (Lavender Country)	G
Peter Häggström	b. 1976	Swedish	Track and field athlete	G
Nathalie Hagman	b. 1991	Swedish	Handball player	L
Kevin Hague	b. 1960	New Zealand	Politician	G
Reynaldo Hahn	1875–1947	Venezuelan-French	Composer, conductor, music critic, diarist	G
Jörg Haider	1950–2008	Austrian	Politician	G
Andrew Haigh	b. 1973	English	Screenwriter, film director	G
Leisha Hailey	b. 1971	American	Actor, pop musician (The Murmurs, Uh Huh Her)	L
William Haines	1900–1973	American	Actor, interior designer	G
Ellis Haizlip	1929–1991	American	TV producer	G
Anja Hajduk	b. 1963	German	Politician	L
Al-Hakam II	915–976	Umayyad dynasty	Second Caliph of Cordoba	B
Salim Halali	1920–2005	Algerian	Singer	G
Ellen Day Hale	1855–1940	American	American Impressionist painter	L
Rob Halford	b. 1951	English	Heavy metal singer(Judas Priest)	G
Justin Hall	b. 1971	American	Cartoonist, educator	G
Luke Edward Hall	b. 1989	British	Interior designer	G
Marc Hall	b. 1984	Canadian	LGBT rights activist who fought in court to bring his boyfriend to the prom	G
Matthew Hall	b. 1970	Canadian	Figure skater	G
Radclyffe Hall	1880–1943	English	Author, poet	L
Siri Hall Arnøy	b. 1978	Norwegian	Politician	L
Todrick Hall	b. 1985	American	Entertainer	G
Ian Hallard	b. 1974	English	Actor, screenwriter	G
David Hallberg	b. ?	American	Dancer	G
Hanne Haller	1950–2005	German	Singer, composer, writer, producer, sound engineer	L
Richard Halliburton	1900–1939	American	Author, traveler, adventurer	B
Ursula Halligan	b. 1960	Irish	Political editor	L
Kenneth Halliwell	1926–1967	English	Artist and murderer of playwright Joe Orton	G
Augusto d'Halmar	1882–1950	Chilean	Writer	G
David Halperin	b. 1952	American	Writer, queer theorist	G
Halsey	b. 1994	American	Singer, songwriter	B
Fred Halsted	1941–1989	American	Film director	G
Halston	1932–1990	American	Fashion designer	G
Boris van der Ham	b. 1973	Dutch	Politician	G
Maggi Hambling	b. 1945	English	Artist	L
Aaron Hamburger	b. 1973	American	Writer	G
Ralph Hamelmann	b. 1967	Canadian	Comic artist, promoter	G
John C. Hamer	b. 1970	American-Canadian	Historian, mapmaker	G
Antony Hamilton	1952–1995	English-Australian	Model, actor	G
Arlan Hamilton	b. 1980	American	Investment fund founder	L
Gerald Hamilton	1890–1970	English	Writer	G
Nancy Hamilton	1908–1985	American	Actor, playwright, lyricist, director, producer	L
Nicholas Hamilton	b. 2000	Australian	Actor, singer	G
Kathryn Hamm	b. 1968	American	Writer	L
Barbara Hammer	1939–2019	American	Experimental filmmaker	L
Anja Hammerseng-Edin	b. 1983	Norwegian	Handball player	L
Gro Hammerseng-Edin	b. 1980	Norwegian	Handball player	L
Harmony Hammond	b. 1944	American	Artist	L
James Henry Hammond	1807–1864	American	Attorney, politician	B
David Hampton	1964–2003	American	Con artist and impostor	G
Mabel Hampton	1902–1989	American	Activist, dancer, philanthropist	L
Nicola Hancock	b. 1995	Australian	Cricketer	L
Klaus Händl	b. 1969	Austrian	Actor, film director, writer	G
Tyler Hanes	b. 1982	American	Actor	G
Vincent Hanley	1954–1987	Irish	DJ, TV personality	G
Kathleen Hanna	b. 1968	American	Rock musician (Bikini Kill, Le Tigre, The Julie Ruin), activist, writer	B
Bretten Hannam	b. ?	Canadian	Film director, screenwriter	G
Dominic Hannigan	b. 1965	Irish	One of the 1st openly gay members of Dáil Éireann	G
Lorraine Hansberry	1930–1965	American	Playwright	L
Joseph Hansen	1923–2004	American	Mystery writer	G
Alan Hansford	b. 1968	English	Cricketer	G
Van Hansis	b. 1981	American	Actor	G
Glen Hanson	b. ?	American	Cartoonist, illustrator	G
Mariette Hansson	b. 1983	Swedish	Pop singer	L
Yuval Noah Harari	b. 1976	Israeli	Historian, author, educator	G
Darlene Hard	1936–2021	American	Tennis player	B
Pernille Harder	b. 1992	Danish	Footballer	L
Gilbert Harding	1907–1960	English	Radio personality	G
David Hardt	b. ?	American	Politician	G
Michael Hardwick	b. ?	American	Litigant in Bowers v. Hardwick case	G
Michelle Hardwick	b. 1976	English	Actor	L
G. H. Hardy	1877–1947	English	Mathematician	G
John Hargreaves	1945–1996	Australian	Actor	G
Brian Hargrove	b. 1956	American	TV writer/producer	G
Johann Hari	b. 1979	British	Journalist	G
Keith Haring	1958–1990	American	Artist	G
Harmodius and Aristogeiton	d. 514 BC	Athenian	Lovers who died freeing Athens from tyrants	G
A. Breeze Harper	b. ?	American	Feminist, diversity strategist, author	B
Bob Harper	b. 1965	American	Personal trainer	G
Curtis Harrington	1926–2007	American	Filmmaker	G
Kellie Harrington	b. 1989	Irish	Boxer	L
Rex Harrington	b. 1962	Canadian	Ballet dancer	G
Ashlyn Harris	b. 1985	American	Soccer player	L
Barry Harris	b. ?	Canadian	Pop singer-songwriter (Kon Kan), musician, composer, DJ	G
Bertha Harris	1937–2005	American	Novelist	L
Bruce Harris	b. 1951	American	Lawyer, politician	G
E. Lynn Harris	b. 1955	American	Author	G
Greg Harris	b. 1955	American	Politician	G
Jeremy O. Harris	b. circa 1988/1989	American	Playwright, actor	G
Kwame Harris	b. 1982	Jamaican-American	Football player	G
Neil Patrick Harris	b. 1973	American	Actor	G
Sam Harris	b. 1961	American	Pop musician, actor	G
Torrey Harris	b. 1991	American	Politician (as of 2021, one of the first two openly-LGBT state representatives elected in Tennessee)	
Campbell Harrison	b. 1997	Australian	Sport climber	G
Jane Ellen Harrison	1850–1928	English	Classical scholar, linguist	B
Jessica Harrison	b. 1977	English-French	Triathlete	L
K. David Harrison	b. 1966	Canadian-American	Anthropologist	G
Lou Harrison	1917–2003	American	20th century classical composer	G
Randy Harrison	b. 1977	American	Actor	G
Todd Harrity	b. 1990	American	Squash player	G
Ellen Hart	b. 1949	American	Author	L
Grant Hart	b. 1961	American	Rock musician (Hüsker Dü)	B
Hannah Hart	b. 1986	American	Internet comedian	L
Lorenz Hart	1895–1943	American	Lyricist; half of Broadway songwriting team Rodgers and Hart	G
Derek Hartley	b. 1969	American	TV show host	G
L. P. Hartley	1895–1972	English	Novelist, short story writer	G
Marsden Hartley	1877–1943	American	Painter, poet	G
Naomi Hartley	b. 2001	English	Footballer	L
Nina Hartley	b. 1959	American	Pornographic actress	B
Dan Hartman	1950–1994	American	Singer-songwriter, musician, producer	G
Kimberly Hart-Simpson	b. 1987	Welsh	Actor, businesswoman	B
Prince Kan'in Haruhito	1902–1988	Japanese	Noble, Imperial Japanese Army officer	G
Adam Haslett	b. 1970	American	Writer, journalist	G
Jeb Havens	b. ?	American	Game designer, video game developer, industry activist, singer-songwriter	G
Andrew Harvey	b. 1952	British	Spiritual scholar	G
Ben Harvey	b. ?	American	DJ	G
Claire Harvey	b. 1974	British	Paralympic sportsperson	L
Donald Harvey	1952–2017	American	Serial killer	G
Ian Harvey	1914–1987	English	MP	G
Jonathan Harvey	b. 1968	English	Playwright	G
Laurence Harvey	1928–1973	Lithuanian-South African	Actor	G
Patrick Harvie	b. 1973	Scottish	Politician	B
Don Harwin	b. 1964	Australian	Politician	G
Sadao Hasegawa	1950–1999	Japanese	Graphic artist	G
Ryōsuke Hashiguchi	b. 1963	Japanese	Film director	G
Bilal Hassani	b. 1999	French	Pop singer	G
O. E. Hasse	1903–1978	German	Actor	G
Kaj Hasselriis	b. 1974	Canadian	Politician, journalist	G
Maddie Hasson	b. 1995	American	Actor	B
Beatrice Hastings	1879–1943	English	Writer	B
Bill Hastings	b. 1957	New Zealand	Chief Censor of New Zealand, then Chief Justice of Kiribati	G
Richard Hatch	b. 1961	American	Reality show contestant	G
Richard Hatfield	1931–1991	Canadian	Politician	G
Bob Hattoy	1950–2007	American	AIDS activist	G
Manos Hatzidakis	1925–1994	Greek	Composer	G
Minas Hatzisavvas	1948–2015	Greek	Actor	G
Miloš Havel	1899–1968	Czech	Entrepreneur, filmmaker	G
Mireille Havet	1898–1932	French	Writer	L
Kyle Hawkins	b. 1975	American	Lacrosse coach	G
Neil Francis Hawkins	1903–1950	British	Fascist politician	G
Sophie B. Hawkins	b. 1967	American	Pop musician	B
Todd B. Hawley	1961–1995	American	One of the 3 founders of the International Space University	G
Nigel Hawthorne	1929–2001	English	Actor	G
Charles Hawtrey	1914–1988	English	Actor, comedian	G
Harry Hay	1912–2002	American	LGBT rights activist	G
Andrew Hayden-Smith	b. 1983	English	TV presenter	G
Bruce Hayes	b. 1963	American	Swimmer	G
Darren Hayes	b. 1972	Australian	Pop musician (Savage Garden)	G
Sean Hayes	b. 1970	American	Actor	G
Colton Haynes	b. 1988	American	Actor, model	G
Todd Haynes	b. 1961	American	Film director	G
Hurley Haywood	b. 1948	American	Race car driver	G
Jane Hazlegrove	b. 1968	English	Actor	L
Leslye Headland	b. 1980	American	Playwright, screenwriter, director	L
James Healey	b. ?	American	Politician	G
Maura Healey	b. 1971	American	Attorney General	L
Trebor Healey	b. ?	American	Writer	G
Jane Heap	1883–1964	American	Publisher	B
Amber Heard	b. 1986	American	Actor	B
Nicole Heavirland	b. 1995	American	Rugby player	L
Anne Heche	1969–2022	American	Actor	B
Wilhelm Heckmann	1897–1995	German	Musician	G
Alexandra Hedison	b. 1969	American	Actor	L
Jayna Hefford	b. 1977	Canadian	Ice hockey player	L
Antony Hegarty	b. 1971	English	Singer-songwriter (Antony and the Johnsons)	G
Sarah Hegazi	1989–2020	Egyptian	Socialist, writer, LGBT activist	L
Claudia van den Heiligenberg	b. 1985	Dutch	Footballer	L
John Heilman	b. ?	American	Mayor	G
Scott Heim	b. 1966	American	Novelist	G
Alex Heimberg	b. ?	American	Drag performer	G
Allan Heinberg	b. 1967	American	Scriptwriter	G
Pekka Heino	b. 1961	Swedish	TV presenter	G
Matt Heinz	b. 1977	American	Physician, politician	G
Miles Heizer	b. 1994	American	Actor	G
Gert Hekma	b. 1951	Dutch	Anthropologist, sociologist, writer, professor	G
J. Roy Helland	b. 1943	American	Film makeup artist	G
Gens Hellquist	1946–2013	Canadian	LGBT rights activist, publisher	G
Jonathan Hellyer	b. ?	English	Pop musician (Bronski Beat)	G
Mathew Helm	b. 1980	Australian	Diver	G
Robert Helpmann	1909–1986	Australian	Dancer, actor, theater director, choreographer	G
Robert Helps	1928–2001	American	20th century classical composer and musician	G
R. J. Helton	b. 1981	American	Christian musician	G
Tim Hely-Hutchinson	b. 1953	English	Publisher	G
Essex Hemphill	1957–1995	American	Poet, activist	G
Hamish Henderson	1919–2002	Scottish	Poet, songwriter, folk-song collector	B
Barbara Hendricks	b. 1952	German	Politician	L
Michael Hendricks	b. ?	American	Psychologist, suicidologist, LGBT advocate	G
Michael Hendricks	1941–2026	Canadian	LGBT rights activist, half of first same-sex marriage in Canada	G
Muhsin Hendricks	1967–2025	South African	World's first openly gay imam, Islamic scholar, LGBT activist	G
Jorik Hendrickx	b. 1992	Belgian	Figure skater	G
Nona Hendryx	b. 1944	American	Singer, record producer, songwriter	B
Ivan Heng	b. 1963	Singaporean	Actor, theater director	G
Mélanie Henique	b. 1992	French	Swimmer	L
Susan Henking	b. 1955	American	Religious studies scholar, president of Shimer College	L
Gavan Hennigan	b. 1981	Irish	Extreme Environment athlete	G
Bianca Henninger	b. 1990	American-Mexican	Football player	L
Aaron Henry	1922–1977	American	Civil rights leader, politician	B
Philip Hensher	b. 1965	English	Author, journalist	G
Hans Werner Henze	1926–2012	German	Composer	G
Alan Herbert	b. ?	Canadian	Politician	G
Manasse Herbst	1913–1997	Austrian-German	Actor, singer	G
Gilbert Herdt	b. 1949	American	Anthropologist	G
Gregory M. Herek	b. 1954	American	Psychologist	G
Bernd-Ulrich Hergemöller	b. 1950	German	Historian	G
Bettina Herlitzius	b. 1960	German	Politician	L
Yvonne Herløv Andersen	b. 1942	Danish	Politician	B
Isabell Herlovsen	b. 1988	Norwegian	Footballer	L
Jerry Herman	1931–2019	American	Musical theater composer	G
Thomas Hermanns	b. 1963	German	TV personality	G
Kakan Hermansson	b. 1981	Swedish	TV presenter, radio host	L
Oliver Hermanus	b. 1983	South African	Film director	G
Jaime Humberto Hermosillo	1942–2020	Mexican	Film director	G
Clodovil Hernandes	1937–2009	Brazilian	Fashion stylist, politician	G
Daisy Hernández	b. 1975	American	Writer, editor	B
David Hernandez	b. 1983	American	Singer	G
Israel Hernandez	b. ?	American	Presidential advisor	G
Joseline Hernandez	b. 1986	American	Reality TV personality, rapper, actor	B
Julián Hernández	b. 1972	Mexican	Filmmaker	G
Laurie Hernandez	b. 2000	American	Artistic gymnast	L
William Hernandez	b. 1979	American	Reality TV personality	G
Daniel Hernández Jr.	b. 1990	American	Politician	G
Ty Herndon	b. 1962	American	Country music singer	G
Sighsten Herrgård	1943–1989	Swedish	Fashion designer	G
Zach Herrin	b. 1995	American	Stock car racing driver	G
Brett Herron	b. 1966	South African	Politician, attorney	G
Fred Hersch	b. 1955	American	Jazz musician	G
Raz Hershko	b. 1998	Israeli	Judoka	L
Carl Hester	b. 1967	English	Dressage rider	G
Laurel Hester	1956–2006	American	Police officer	L
Ebbe Hertzberg	1847–1912	Norwegian	Social economist, legal historian, educator	G
Gordon Heuckeroth	b. 1958	Dutch	Singer, TV personality	G
Ralph Hexter	b. 1952	American	Academic administrator, scholar	G
Michelle Heyman	b. 1988	Australian	Football player	L
Richard A. Heyman	1935–1994	American	Politician	G
Lida Gustava Heymann	1868–1943	German	Feminist, suffragette	L
Tomer Heymann	b. 1970	Israeli	Filmmaker	G
Carter Heyward	b. 1945	American	Clergy	L
Edward Hibbert	b. 1955	American	Actor	G
Hibiscus	1949–1982	American	Performance artist, actor, drag performer	G
John Benjamin Hickey	b. 1963	American	Actor	G
René Hicks	1956–2026	American	Comedian	L
Jacob Hiegentlich	1907–1940	Dutch	Poet	G
Missy Higgins	b. 1983	Australian	Pop musician	B
René Highway	1954–1990	Canadian	Dancer	L
Jennifer Higdon	b. 1962	American	Classical composer, musician	L
Abraham Higginbotham	b. ?	American	Screenwriter	G
Colin Higgins	1941–1988	Australian-American	Screenwriter, actor, director, producer	G
Patricia Highsmith	1921–1995	American	Writer	B
Marta Higueras	b. 1964	Spanish	Criminologist, politician	L
Brianna Hildebrand	b. 1996	American	Actor	L
Jane Hill	b. 1969	English	Newsreader	L
Jimmy Hill	b. 1989	English	Radio, TV, and Internet personality	G
Jeff Hiller	b. 1975/1976	American	Actor, comedian	G
Kurt Hiller	1885–1972	German	Essayist, journalist, activist	G
Karin Hils	b. 1979	Brazilian	Actor, singer, songwriter	B
Perez Hilton	b. 1978	American	Celebrity gossip blogger	G
Nikki Hiltz	b. 1994	American	Middle-distance runner	L
Maurice Hines	1943–2023	American	Actor, singer, dancer	G
Phillip Hinkle	b. 1946	American	Politician	B
Jon Hinson	1942–1995	American	Politician	G
Peter Hinwood	b. 1946	English	Actor, antiques dealer	G
Hiraga Gennai	1729–1784	Japanese	Polymath, inventor, author, samurai	G
Fredy Hirsch	1916–1944	German	Teacher, sportsman, helper of Jewish children during World War II	G
Lora Hirschberg	b. 1963	American	Sound engineer	L
Magnus Hirschfeld	1868–1935	German	Doctor, LGBT rights activist	G
Axel Hirsoux	b. 1982	Belgian	Pop singer	G
Keegan Hirst	b. 1988	English	1st openly gay British professional rugby player	G
Hisham II	966–1013	Umayyad dynasty	Umayyad Caliph of Spain	G
George Hislop	1927–2005	Canadian	Gay rights activist	G
Charles Hitchen	1675–1727	English	Thief-taker	G
Christopher Hitchens	1949–2011	English-American	Author, orator, religious, social, and literary critic and journalist	B
Thomas Hitzlsperger	b. 1982	German	Football player	G
Bjarte Hjelmeland	b. 1970	Norwegian	Actor, musician	G
Hồ Vĩnh Khoa	b. 1988	Vietnamese	Actor, model	G
Denise Ho	b. 1977	Hong Kong	Pop singer	L
Jon Hoadley	b. 1983	American	Politician	G
Simon Hobart	1964–2005	English	Nightclub owner	G
Hannah Höch	1889–1978	German	Artist	B
David Hockney	1937–2026	English	Artist	G
Guy Hocquenghem	1946–1988	French	Philosopher	G
Howard Hodgkin	1932–2017	English	Painter, printmaker	G
Marie Høeg	1866–1949	Norwegian	Photographer	L
Robby Hoffman	b. 1989	American-Canadian	Writer, comedian, talk show host	L
Gunvor Hofmo	1921–1995	Norwegian	Poet	G
Kate Hogan	b. 1957	American	Politician	L
Richèl Hogenkamp	b. 1992	Dutch	Tennis player	L
Lee Hoiby	1926–2011	American	Composer	G
Kinmont Hoitsma	1934–2013	American	Fencer	G
Pentti Holappa	1927–2017	Finnish	Poet, writer, translator, politician	G
Chamique Holdsclaw	b. 1977	American	Basketball player	L
Billie Holiday	1915–1959	American	Jazz singer, songwriter	B
Tony Holiday	1951–1990	German	Pop singer	G
Ursula Holl	b. 1981	German	Footballer	L
Holland	b. 1996	South Korean	Singer; 1st openly gay K-pop idol	G
Henry Holland	b. 1983	English	Fashion designer	G
Todd Holland	b. 1961	American	Film and TV director/producer	G
Xaviera Hollander	b. 1943	American	Writer, Madam	B
Andrew Holleran	b. 1944	American	Writer	G
Tess Holliday	b. 1985	American	Model, activist, make-up artist	B
Earl Holliman	1928–2024	American	Actor	G
Alan Hollinghurst	b. 1954	English	Author	G
B. Dylan Hollis	b. 1995	Bermudian-American	Social media personality, baker	G
Ulf Holm	b. 1969	Swedish	Politician	G
Antti Holma	b. 1982	Finnish	Author, actor	G
Chuck Holmes	1945–2000	American	Adult film producer, businessman, philanthropist	G
Dave Holmes	b. 1971	American	Writer, producer, TV personality	G
John Wendell Holmes	1910–1988	Canadian	Diplomat, academic	G
Kelly Holmes	b. 1970	British	Track and field athlete	L
Shelley Holroyd	b. 1973	English	Javelin thrower	L
Erika Holst	b. 1979	Swedish	Ice hockey player	L
Johannes Holzmann (AKA Senna Hoy)	1882–1914	German	Anarchist author, activist	G
Wilhelm von Homburg	1940–2004	German	Boxer, actor, professional wrestler	B
Alice Y. Hom	b. 1967	American	Community activist, author	L
A.M. Homes	b. 1961	American	Writer	B
Honey G (rapper)	b. 1981	English	Rapper	L
Hong Seok-cheon	b. 1971	South Korean	Actor	G
Pirjo Honkasalo	b. 1947	Finnish	Filmmaker	L
Philippe Honoré	b. 1967	French	Classical musician	G
Alexander Hood, 5th Duke of Bronte	1854–1937	English-Sicilian	Noble	G
Nalo Hopkinson	b. 1960	Jamaican-Canadian	Writer	L
Bettina Hoppe	b. 1974	German	Actor	L
Horace	65–8 BC	Roman	Lyric poet	B
James Hormel	1933–2021	American	Former United States ambassador to Luxembourg	G
Roy Horn	1944–2020	German-American	Magician, entertainer	G
Anders Hornslien	b. 1970	Norwegian	Politician, TV presenter	G
Nitzan Horowitz	b. 1965	Israeli	Journalist, politician	G
Vladimir Horowitz	1902–1989	Russian	Pianist	G
Horse	b. 1958	Scottish	Singer-songwriter	L
Horst P. Horst	1906–1999	German	Photographer	G
Silvio Horta	1974–2020	American	Screenwriter, producer	G
Craig Revel Horwood	b. 1965	Australian	Dancer, choreographer, TV personality	B
Elmyr de Hory	1906–1976	Hungarian	Artist, art forger	G
Basil Hoskins	1929–2005	English	Actor	G
Stephen Hough	b. 1961	English-Australian	Composer, pianist	G
TJ House	b. 1989	American	Baseball player	G
A. E. Housman	1859–1936	English	Poet	G
Laurence Housman	1865–1959	English	Playwright	G
Robert Houston	b. 1955	American	Actor, director	G
Ivo van Hove	b. 1958	Belgian	Theater director, producer	G
Brenda Howard	1946–2005	American	Activist	B
Brittany Howard	b. 1988	American	Singer-songwriter, musician (Alabama Shakes)	L
Byron Howard	b. 1968	American	Film director, animator	G
Charlie Howard	1961–1984	American	Murder victim	G
Michael Howard	1922–2019	English	Military historian	G
Richard Howard	1929–2022	American	Poet, literary critic, essayist, teacher, translator	G
Herbert Howe	1893–1959	American	Journalist	G
James Howe	b. 1946	American	Children's author	G
Daniel Howell	b. 1991	English	YouTuber	G
Frankie Howerd	1917–1992	English	Comedian	G
Bent Høie	b. 1971	Norwegian	Politician	G
Scott Hoying	b. 1991	American	Singer-songwriter	G
David Hoyle	b. 1962	English	Performance artist	G
Brad Hoylman	b. 1965	American	Politician	G
Magdalen Hsu-Li	b. 1970	American	Singer-songwriter, painter, Lecturer, writer, cultural activist	B
Jamie Hubley	1995–2011	Canadian	Youth who committed suicide due to anti-gay bullying	G
Angela Hucles	b. 1978	American	Soccer player	L
Rock Hudson	1925–1985	American	Actor	G
Waymon Hudson	b. 1979	American	LGBT activist, writer	G
David Huebner	b. 1960	American	Diplomat	G
Joy Huerta	b. 1986	Mexican	Pop musician (Jesse & Joy)	L
Tanya Huff	b. 1957	Canadian	Writer	L
Michael Huffington	b. 1947	American	Politician, activist	B
Sarah Huffman	b. 1984	American	Soccer player	B
Huffty	b. ?	English	TV presenter	L
Chris Hughes	b. 1983	American	Entrepreneur, co-founder of Facebook	G
Gareth Hughes	1894–1965	Welsh	Actor	G
Langston Hughes	1902–1967	American	Writer	G
Simon Hughes	b. 1951	English	Politician	B
Todd M. Hughes	b. 1966	American	Judge of the U.S. Circuit Court	G
Tom Hugo	b. 1979	Norwegian	Singer-songwriter, musician (KEiiNO)	G
Victor Hugo	1948–1994	Venezuelan-American	Artist, window dresser	G
Marianne Huguenin	b. 1950	Swiss	Politician	L
Emperor Hui of Han	210–188 BCE	Chinese (Han dynasty)	Head of state	B
Coos Huijsen	b. 1939	Dutch	Politician, historian, author	G
Peter Hujar	1934–1987	American	Photographer	G
Tom Hulce	b. 1953	American	Actor	G
Ross Hull	b. 1975	Canadian	Actor, TV personality	G
Karen Hultzer	b. 1956	South African	Archer	L
Alexander von Humboldt	1769–1859	Prussian	Polymath, geographer, naturalist, explorer	G
Jim Humes	b. ?	American	Judge of the California Court of Appeals	G
Andy Humm	b. 1953	American	Journalist, activist, co-host of TV news program Gay USA	G
Laud Humphreys	1930–1988	American	Sociologist, writer, priest	G
Isaac Humphries	b. 1998	Australian	Basketball player	G
Herbert Huncke	1915–1996	American	Writer, poet	B
Mia Hundvin	b. 1977	Norwegian	Handball player	B
Kit Hung	b. 1977	Hong Kong	Filmmaker	G
Jerry Hunt	1943–1993	American	20th century classical composer	G
J. Timothy Hunt	b. 1955	American	Journalist and writer	G
Linda Hunt	b. 1945	American	Actor	L
Richard Hunt	1951–1992	American	Puppeteer	G
Ruth Hunt	b. 1945	Welsh	Chief executive of Stonewall, politician	L
Ben Hunte	b. 1991	English	Correspondent, journalist, TV presenter	G
Alberta Hunter	1895–1984	American	Blues musician	B
Ian Hunter	b. 1960	Australian	Politician	G
Ross Hunter	1926–1996	American	Film and TV producer, actor	G
Tab Hunter	1931–2018	American	Actor, singer	G
Helen Huntington Hull	1893–1976	American	Socialite, arts patron	B
Huo Guang	d. 68 BCE	Chinese (Han dynasty)	Statesman	B
Maarten Hurkmans	b. 1997	Dutch	Rower	B
David Hurles	1944–2023	American	Pornographer	G
Waris Hussein	b. 1938	Indian-British	TV and film director	G
Leslie Hutchinson	1900–1969	Grenadian	Musician	B
Mark Michael Hutchinson	b. 1959	English	Actor	G
Svenja Huth	b. 1991	German	Footballer	L
William Hutt	1920–2007	Canadian	Actor	G
Kate Hutton	b. ?	American	Seismologist	L
Nadine Hwang	1902–1972	Chinese	Lawyer, pilot	L
Hyegong of Silla	758–780	Korean	King of Silla	G
Chris Hyndman	1966–2015	Canadian	Interior designer, TV personality	G
Garry Hynes	b. 1953	Irish	Theater director	L
Diego Hypólito	b. 1986	Brazilian	Gymnast	G
Anton Hysén	b. 1990	Swedish	Footballer	G
Nicholas Hytner	b. 1956	English	Stage and screen director	G

== See also ==
- List of gay, lesbian or bisexual people
