= Les Soirées de Paris =

Les Soirées de Paris was a French literary and artistic review founded in February 1912 by Guillaume Apollinaire and four of his associates - André Billy, René Dalize, André Salmon, and André Tudesq. It was last published in August 1914.

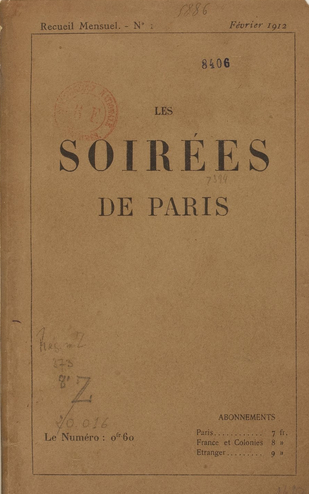
«Les Soirées de Paris»; numéro 1 (février 1912)

== Contributors ==
=== Editors ===
- First series

Guillaume Apollinaire; André Tudesq; René Dalize; André Billy; André Salmon; Maurice de Waleffe; Jacques Dyssord; Charles Perrés; Marcel Duminy; Roch Grey; J. De L'esc; Jérôme Tharaud; Adolphe Paupe; Eugène Montfort; Fernand Divoire; Tristan Derème; Bernard Combette; Marc Henry; Peter Altember; Borgne Le Crocheteur; Henry Céard; Adolphe Lacuzon; Charles-Léon Bernardin; Émile Zavie; Francis Carco; George Sabiron; Doniazade; Sébastien Voirol; Vincent Muselli; Émile Magne; Jean Pellerin; Maurice Raynal; Jean Paulhan.

- Second series

Guillaume Apollinaire; Jean Cerusse; André Billy; Léonard Pieux; Jacques Dyssord; Max Jacob; René Bizet; René Dalize; Roch Grey; Émile Zavie; Maurice Raynal; Fernand Fleuret; Horace Holley; Gabrielle Buffet; Mireille Havet; Jacques Dyssord; André Dupont; Dominique Combette; Adolphe Basler; Henri Rousseau; Edgard Varèse; Fernand Divoire; Giovanni Papini; Harrison Reeve; Henri Hertz; Jean Le Roy; Pierre Henner; Louis Rive; Paul Visconti; Vincent Muselli; Jean Royère; Blaise Cendrars; Alberto Savinio; Albert Haas; Henri Strentz; Guy-Pierre Fauconnet; Ambroise Vollard; Ardengo Soffici; Fernand Léger; O. -W. Gambedoo; F. S. Flint; Gabriel Arbouin; Mireille Havet; Léopold Sturzwage; Georges Rouault; Alan Seeger.

=== Illustrators ===
Pablo Picasso (No. 18); Marie Laurencin (No. 19); Henri Matisse (No. 19, 24); Jean Metzinger (No. 19); Albert Gleizes (No. 19); Henri Rousseau (No. 20); André Derain (No.21); Francis Picabia (No. 22); Georges Braque (No.23); Archipenko (No. 25); Fernand Léger (No. 26&27); Marius de Zayas (No. 26&27); Maurice de Vlaminck (No. 26&27); Georges Rouault (No. 26&27).
