= Adolphe Basler =

Polish-French author, gallery owner, art critic, art historian and collector

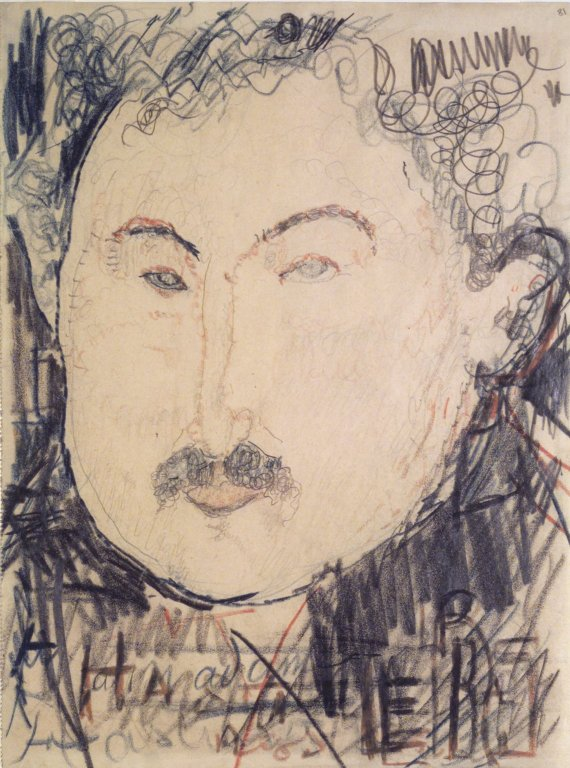
Portrait of Adolphe Basler by Amedeo Modigliani (1916, Brooklyn Museum)

Adolphe Basler (born 28 April 1878 in Tarnów, Austria-Hungary; died 6 January 1951 in Paris) was a Polish-French author, gallery owner, art critic, art historian and collector.

== Life ==
Adolphe Basler came from a family of rabbis and innkeepers in Krakow. He initially studied chemistry in Zurich from 1896 before moving to Paris two years later, where he continued his studies at the Sorbonne. There he met his compatriot Mécislas Golberg, author of La morale des lignes, who introduced him to the fine arts and art criticism. He was a frequent guest at the Closerie des Lilas, in the circle around Paul Fort and Georges Kars. In order to make a living, he worked as an art dealer in the field of modern art and was one of the first to acquire works by Moise Kisling. In the 1920s, he ran the Galerie de Sèvres, where he showed works by Raoul Dufy, Maurice Utrillo and Othon Coubine.

Basler moved in Parisian artistic circles in the Montparnasse district with Amedeo Modigliani, Jules Pascin, André Salmon, Rudolf Levy and others. Hans Purrmann described Basler as "another welcome habitué of the Dôme."

Basler wrote a series of essays and books on classical modern artists, including André Derain, Charles Despiau, Henri Matisse, Pierre-Auguste Renoir, Henri Rousseau, Maurice Utrillo, and Suzanne Valadon, as well as La Peniture indépendante en France and La Sculpture Moderne en France, which also dealt with Wilhelm Lehmbruck. Basler wrote for the magazines Die Aktion, Der Cicerone, La Revue Blanche, Latinité, Les Soirées de Paris, and Mercure de France, among others. He corresponded with Derain, Marurice de Vlaminck, Jean Dufy, Guillaume Apollinaire, Félix Fénéon, Pual Cassirer and Alfred Stieglitz.

Basler owned a number of works by his artist friends, such as the drawings Head of a Young Girl and Still Life with Bottle and a Pot of Hyacinths by Picasso. He was portrayed by Modigliani, Béla Czóbel, Isaac Grünewald, Moïse Kisling and Arvid Fougstedt, among others. A collection of Basler's essays, written in German, was edited by Rudolf Levy.

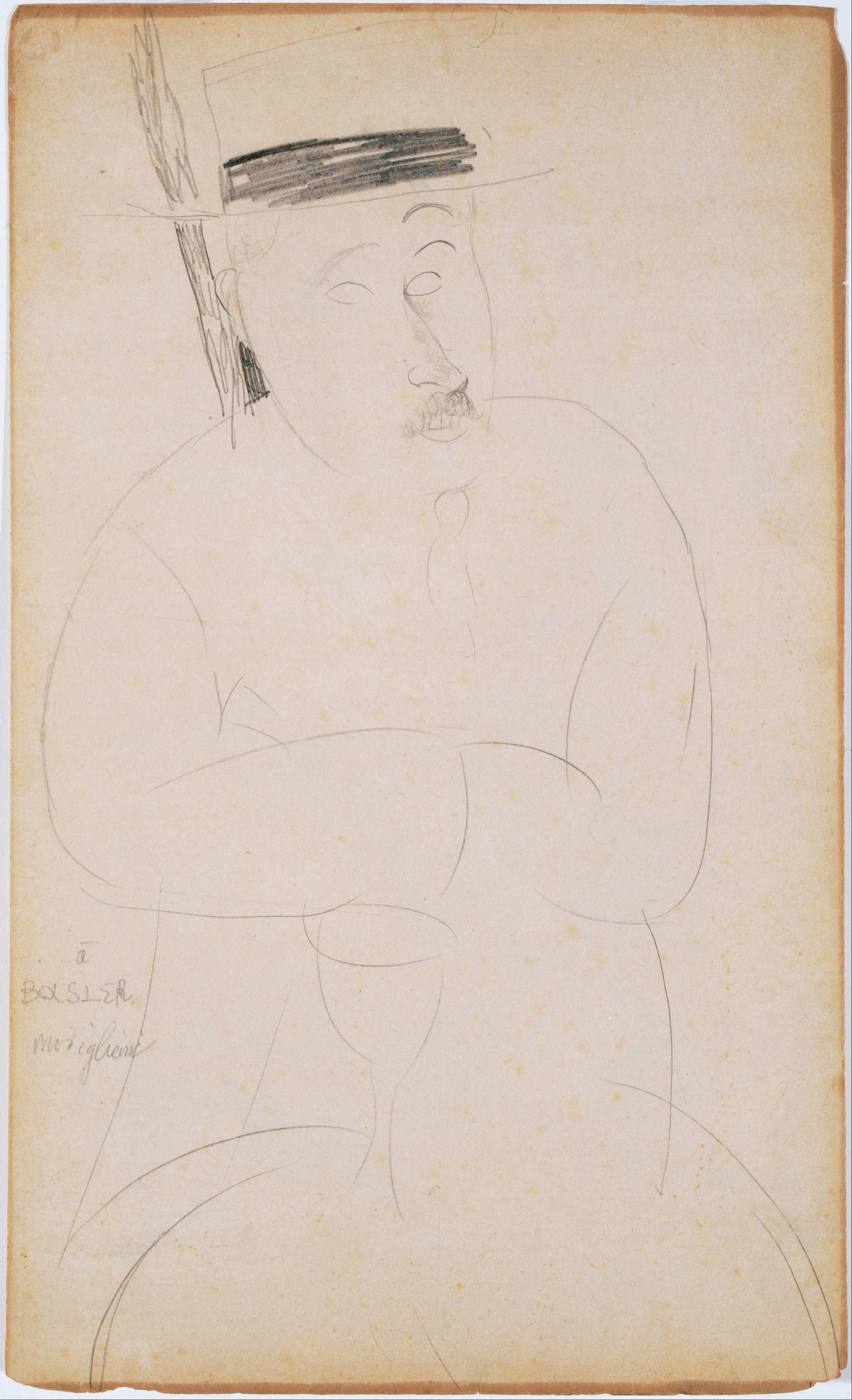
Portrait of Adolphe Basler by Amedeo Modigliani

== Selected publications ==
- with Hans Curjel: Pariser Chronik. Biermann, 1922.
- Henri Matisse. Leipzig, Klinkhardt & Biermann 1924.
- Indenbuam. Paris: Editions Le Triangle (ca. 1925)
- Henri Rousseau et son œuvre: (le Douanier Rousseau). Paris: Librairie Gallimard, 1927 and New York City: Weyhe 1927
- Pierre-Auguste Renoir. Paris: Gallimard 1928.
- with Ernest Brummer: L’Art Precolombien. Paris, Librairie de France, 1928.
- with Charles Kunstler: La peinture independante en France. 2 Bände. I: De Monet a Bonnard. - II: De Matisse a Segonzac. Paris: G.Cres 1929.
- Le cafard apres la fete ou l'esthetisme d’aujourd'hui. Paris: Jean Budry 1929.
- with Charles Kunstler: Le dessin et la gravure modernes en France. Paris: Les Editions G. Gres, 1930.
- Maurice Utrillo. Paris: Les Editions Cres, 1931.
- Leonard de Vinci. Paris: Braun & Cie. 1938.
  - Leonardo da Vinci. Meister der Kunst. Mülhausen im Elsass: Braun, 1942.

== Literature ==
- Ulrich Wilke: Heinz Witte-Lenoir – Werkverzeichnis. Berichte von ihm und über ihn – Lehrer, Vorbilder und Weggefährten – Verzeichnis seiner Werke. Niebüll, Verlag videel o. J. (ca. 2003), ISBN 3-89906-669-3.
