= Amy Walter =

American political analyst (born 1969)

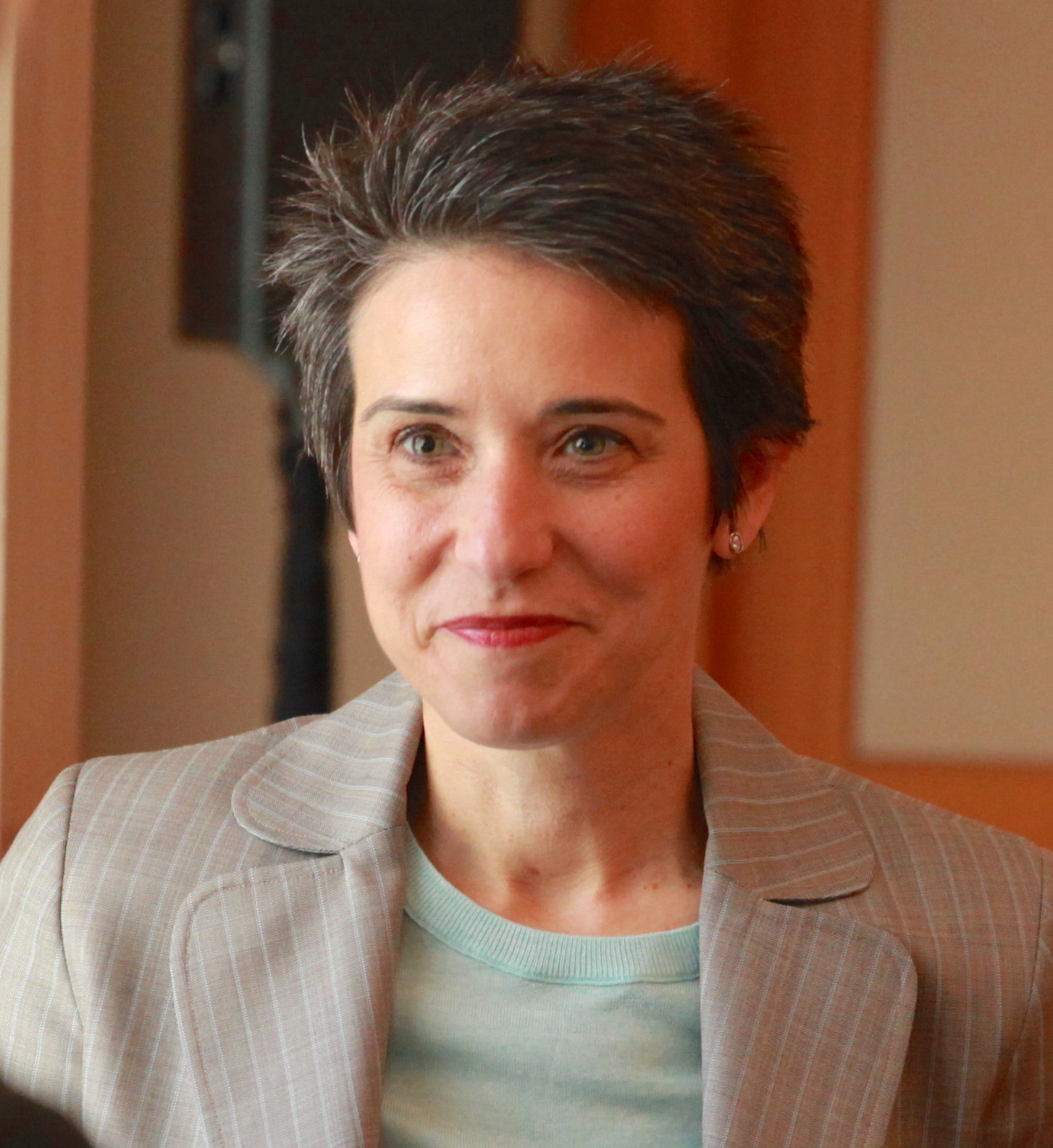
- Born: Amy Elizabeth Walter; October 19, 1969 (age 56)
- Education: Colby College (BA)
- Occupations: Political analyst and journalist
- Spouse: Kathryn Hamm (m. 2013)
- Children: 1

Amy Elizabeth Walter (born October 19, 1969) is an American political analyst who is the publisher and editor-in-chief of The Cook Political Report with Amy Walter. Since 2015, she has also served as a political analyst for the PBS News Hour. Walter specializes in forecasting and analyzing national U.S. elections.

== Early life and education ==
Walter was born on October 19, 1969. She was raised in Barrington, Illinois, and is a 1987 graduate of Barrington High School. She graduated summa cum laude from Colby College in 1991 and sits on its board of trustees.

== Career ==
Walter began working at The Cook Political Report in 1997. Between then and 2007 she served as a senior editor covering the United States House of Representatives. She then served as the Editor-in-Chief at the National Journal's Hotline from 2007 to 2010.

In 2010, Walter left the National Journal to serve as political director for ABC News. She worked for ABC News until 2013, when she returned to The Cook Political Report as its national editor. On July 30, 2021, upon Charlie Cook's departure, she was named editor and publisher of The Cook Political Report, and the publication was retitled The Cook Political Report with Amy Walter.

Walter's work has been featured in The Washington Post, The Wall Street Journal, and The New York Times. She has also been featured on numerous broadcasts, such as Washington Week, Face the Nation, PBS News Hour, Fox News Sunday with Chris Wallace, Andrea Mitchell Reports, the Daily Rundown, the Chris Matthews Show, and Meet the Press. She has also made numerous appearances on Special Report with Brett Baier, both as a contributor and on the panel.

== Awards and recognition ==
Walter's analysis has earned several accolades. In 2000, she received The Washington Post's Crystal Ball Award for her accuracy in predicting George W. Bush as the winner of that year's presidential election. She was part of CNN's Emmy Award-winning coverage of the 2006 elections. In 2009, Washingtonian magazine named Walter one of the 50 top journalists in DC. In 2021, Washingtonian named her one of Washington’s Most Powerful Women. In 2026, Walter won DePaul University's Distinguished Journalist Award.

Walter was an inaugural fellow at the Institute of Politics at the University of Chicago. She was awarded an honorary Doctor of Letters by Colby College, her alma mater, in 2017.

== Personal life ==
Walter married her longtime partner, author Kathryn Hamm, in 2013. They adopted a son in 2006.
