= Hélène Oettingen =

French painter and poet (1887–1950)

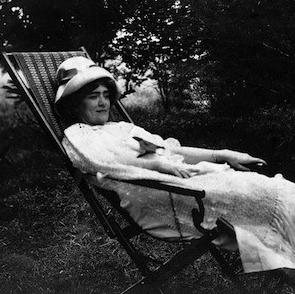
boulevard Berthier in Paris circa 1910

Baroness Hélèné d'Oettingen (1887, - 1950, Paris), born Elena Francezna Miaczinska, was a Russian-French painter and writer. Her father is believed to have been a Polish nobleman, but she supposedly acquired the baroness title through marrying a Baltic baron.

D'Oettingen used male pseudonyms to publish her art. She is known as a poet under the pseudonym Leonardo Pieu, as a novelist and art critic under the pseudonym Roch Grey, and as a painter under the pseudonym François Angiboult.

She studied at the Académie Julian. In the 1910s, she held a literary salon, at her home on 229 Boulevard Raspail. This became an important meeting spot for avant-garde artists and critics, such as Guillaume Apollinaire, Pablo Picasso, Francis Picabia, Ossip Zadkine, Amadeo Modigliani and Alexander Archipenko. Before the war, she helped save Les Soirées de Paris, with her nephew and lover Serge Férat. This made her a crucial link in the prewar cubist network in Paris. Moreover, she also met Ardengo Soffici and De Chirico.

In 1918, she rented a large apartment in Nice where she hosted Marthe Donas and Archipenko, but also Modigliani and Jeanne Hébuterne, at the time pregnant. Art dealers Paul Guillaume and Leopold Zborowski also visited this apartment.

Her work was exhibited at the Pushkin Museum.

== Works ==
- Le Château de l'étang rouge, Roch Grey, illuminated with wood engraved by Survage.
- « L'Homme, la ville, le voyage » a text published in the magazine SIC.
- Chevaux de minuit, thirteen poems illustrated by Picasso in 1936 and published by Iliazd.
- Roch Grey,Le Château de l’Étang rouge, Les Trois lacs, L’Âge de fer, Billet circulaire ,Foreword by Isabel Violante, Paris, Conti, 2010.
- Roch Grey, Photographies verbales : Écrits sur l’art et les artistes (1913-1956),Introduction by Isabel Violante, Paris, Le Minotaure, 2016, 128 pp. (ISBN 978-2-916775-31-9)
