= Röda tråden =

Swedish television quiz show

Röda tråden (English: The Red Thread) is a Swedish television quiz show with Pekka Heino as its host that was shown on SVT in the 1990s. The program's purpose was for the participants to find "the red thread" (common denominator) in problem formulations, which consisted of a set of pictures. The theme song of the show was "Wonderful World" by Sam Cooke.

There were three sections to the show. The first was "The Red Thread", including pictures which all had a common feature which the contestants had to figure out. Then came "Letter link" (Swedish: Bokstavslänken) where the letters in a word were made visible to the contestants one after another when they correctly answered questions which popped up. The third portion was "Celebrity chain" (Swedish: Kändiskedjan), where pictures of celebrities were linked together by a common denominator; for example the first picture could have been table tennis player Kjell Johansson, and the next picture could have then been ice hockey goalie Kjell Svensson, etc.
