= René Dalize =

French writer

René Dalize, born René Dupuy des Islettes (Paris, 30 November 1879 – 7 May 1917 at Chemin des Dames) was a French writer. He was a friend of Guillaume Apollinaire. Apollinaire dedicated his collection Calligrammes to him.

== Works ==
- Le Club des neurasthéniques. Paris. 1912., serialized under the pseudonym Franquevaux in the newspaper Paris-Midi.
- With Guillaume Apollinaire
  - Bibliothèque des curieux, ed. (1914). La Rome des Borgia. Paris..
  - Bibliothèque des curieux, ed. (1914). Les trois Don Juan. Paris..
  - Bibliothèque des curieux, ed. (1914). La fin de Babylone. Paris..
- Posthumous works
  - Ballade du pauvre Macchabé mal enterré (1919)
  - Au Zanzi des cœurs : comédie en un acte; préface d'André Billy; pointe sèche d'Yvonne Préveraud (1931) (with Paul-Jean Toulet)
  - Ballade du pauvre macchabée mal enterré (2009)
  - Le Club des neurasthéniques, roman inédit présenté par Éric Dussert (2013)
