= Kathryn Hamm =

American author

- Born: Kathryn Elizabeth Hamm; June 2, 1969 (age 57); Dallas, Texas, U.S.
- Education: Princeton University (BA); Catholic University of America (MSW)
- Spouse: Amy Walter (m. 2013)
- Children: 1

Kathryn Elizabeth Hamm (born June 2, 1969) is an American author and businesswoman who has served as the chief operating officer of The Cook Political Report with Amy Walter since 2021.

Prior to joining Cook, Hamm had a successful career in the wedding industry. She was the publisher of GayWeddings until its acquisition by WeddingWire in 2015. She also co-authored The New Art of Capturing Love (2014), a photographic guide to same-sex weddings.

== Early life and education ==
Hamm was born and raised in Dallas, Texas. After graduating from Greenhill School in Addison, Texas, Hamm attended Princeton University where, as a freshman, she was the leading seasonal scorer for the university women's soccer team. She graduated from Princeton with a Bachelor of Arts (B.A.) in psychology and then received a Master of Social Work (M.S.W.) from Catholic University. She also served as an educator and school administrator in the Washington, D.C. area.

== Wedding business ==
In 1999, Hamm's mother Gretchen began a business out of frustration at the lack of suitable wedding accessories available as Hamm planned a commitment ceremony with her female partner. The business, which eventually was called Gayweddings.com, included offering "femme" or "butch" thank-you cards and fancy wedding proclamations. At the beginning of the business, vendors at stationery shows "would just look at her like she was crazy" but a few years later the vendors showed more interest in helping out. Near the end of 2006, Hamm headed the business Gretchen started to allow her mother to increase her lobbying efforts for equal rights for same-sex couples. Hamm began holding 'Gay Weddings 101' wedding-planning seminars in areas such as Chicago, Boston, and Washington D.C. During an interview at the end of 2006, the Virginia-based wedding consultant noted, "For the longest time, there was so much shame and privacy around it that people didn't really give themselves permission to have ceremonies like this. ... The market is growing as the headlines remain out there."

In 2010, Hamm formed a business partnership with American singer-songwriter Catie Curtis to serve as a wedding officiate for GayWeddings.com and help same-sex couples design their own ceremonies.

In 2013, she married her long-time partner, political analyst Amy Walter.

In 2013, with photographer Thea Dodds, she co-authored Capturing Love: The Art of Lesbian and Gay Wedding Photography which was reviewed by Human Rights Campaign, National Public Radio, Boston Globe, Good Morning America, Talk Radio News Service, KNPR, Baltimore Sun, Echomag.com. Good Morning America called the book a "groundbreaking guide" to same-sex marriage, and Human Rights Campaign said Hamm was a "wedding innovator".

In May 2013, the book was picked up by Amphoto Books (an imprint of the Crown Publishing Group) and revised and expanded for release as The New Art of Capturing Love: The Essential Guide to Lesbian & Gay Wedding Photography on May 6, 2014.

In June 2015, WeddingWire, Inc acquired GayWeddings.com.

== The Cook Political Report with Amy Walter ==
Hamm joined the staff of The Cook Political Report with Amy Walter in 2021 when she and Amy Walter acquired the business as co-owners. As the organization's chief operating officer, Hamm has spearheaded efforts to emphasize the organization's brand and expand its subscriber base.
