= Pekka Heino (television presenter) =

Swedish television presenter

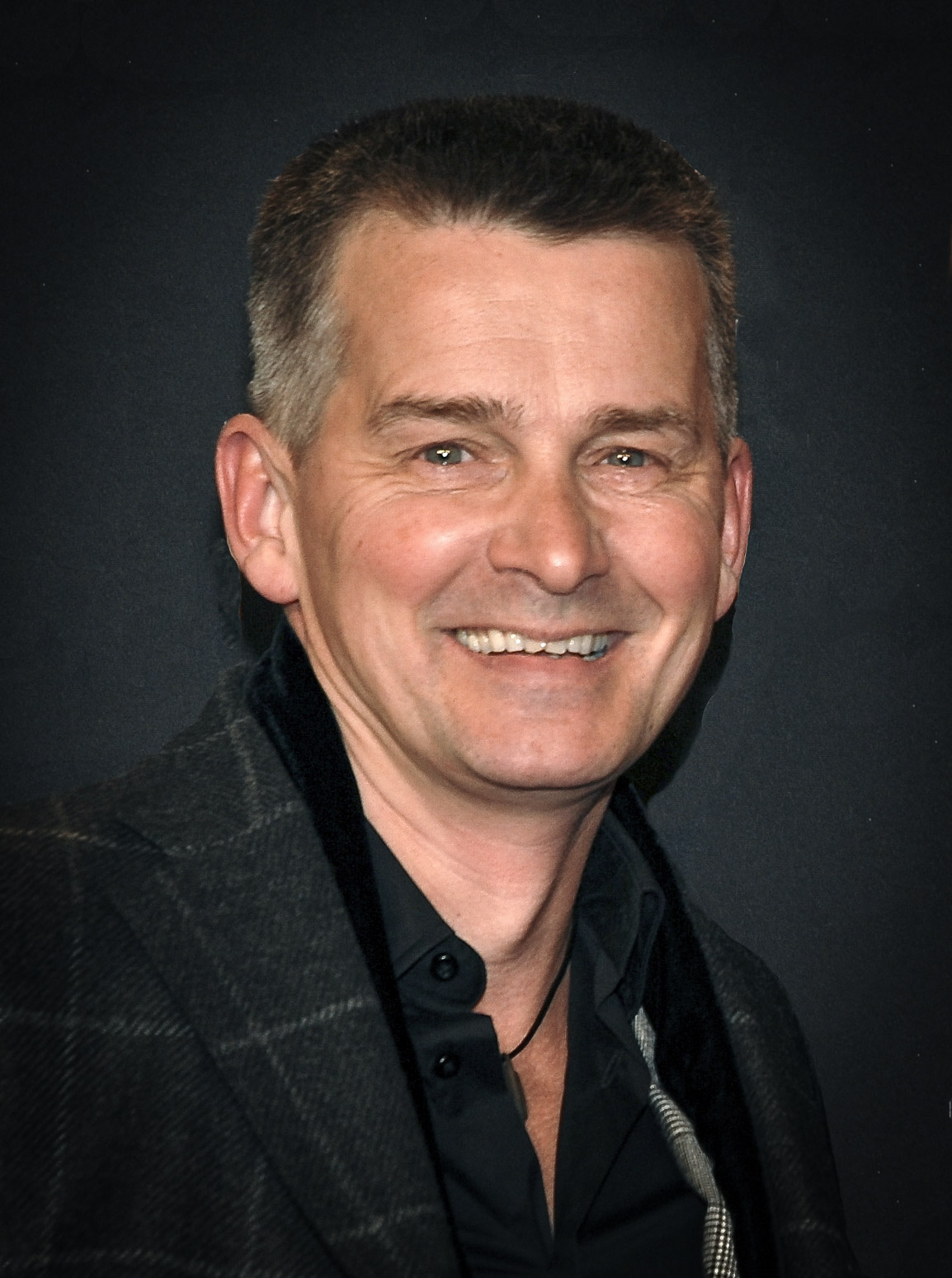
- Pekka Heino in January 2012
- Born: 17 July 1961 (age 64); Åbo (Turku), Finland
- Occupations: Continuity announcer and television host

Pekka Heino (born 17 July 1961) is a television host and presenter from Åbo (Turku). He is a Sweden Finn. Heino introduces television programmes as a continuity announcer on the Swedish channel SVT, where he has been working on and off since 1985. He has also hosted a number of Swedish television shows, including the popular SVT quiz show Röda tråden, and has commentated on the Eurovision Song Contest several years for Sweden. During the summer of 2010, Heino hosted the morning show Gomorron Sverige on SVT. It was announced in December 2010 that Heino would host the SVT programme Gokväll together with Inger Ljung.

== Personal life ==
Heino is openly gay.
