= Mireille Havet =

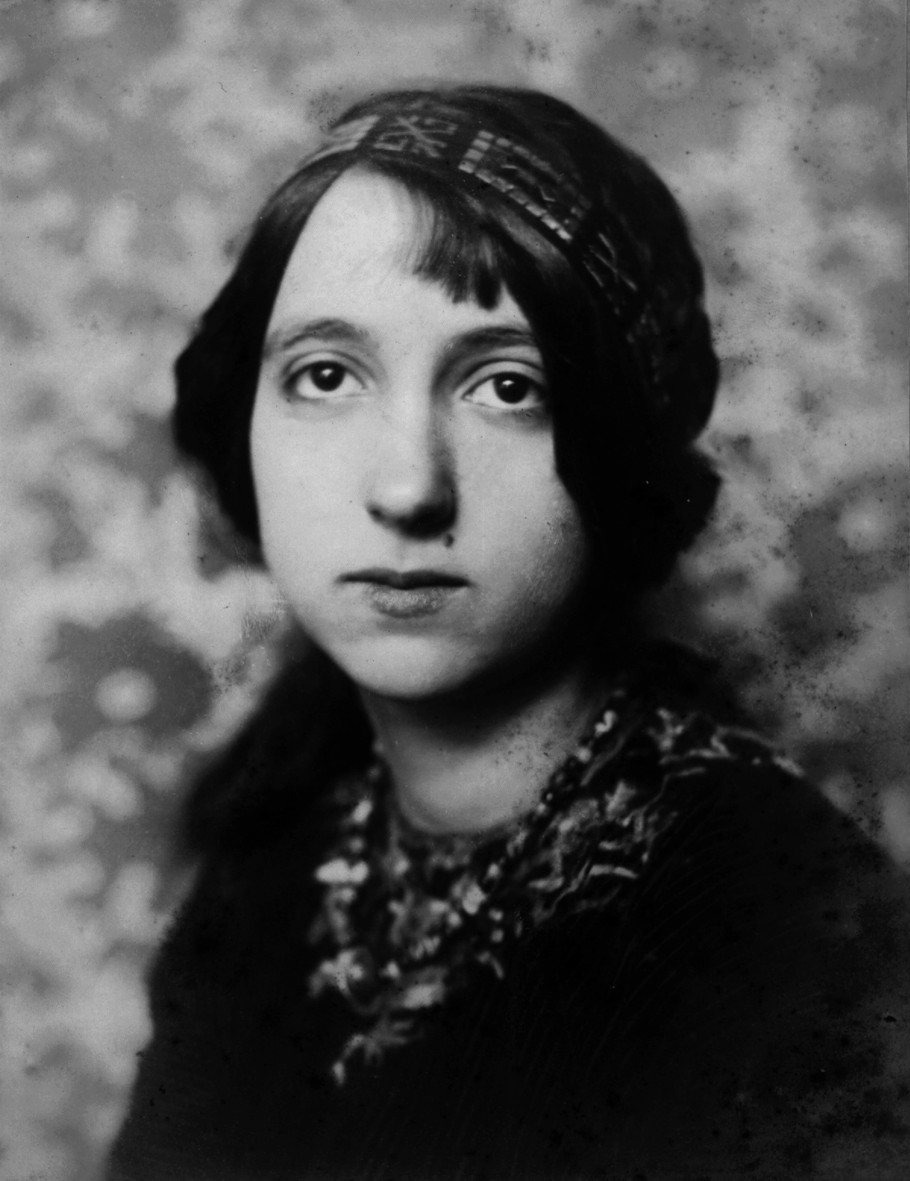
Mireille Havet

Mireille Havet ( 4 October 1898, Médan – 21 March 1932, Crans-Montana, Switzerland) was a French poet, diarist, novelist, and lyricist.

She wrote lyrics for songs composed by John Alden Carpenter and intended for Éva Gauthier. She wrote a novel, Carnaval, published in 1923. She was friends with Jean Cocteau and Colette, who referred to her as "la petite poyétesse".

She was openly lesbian.

Her diary, which she kept from 1913 to 1929, was only found again in 1995, and published in 2003.

On 29 January 2009, a public square was named after her in Paris.
