= Eurovision Song Contest 1999 =

International song competition

Date and venue
- Final: 29 May 1999
- Venue: International Convention Centre; Jerusalem, Israel

Organisation
- Organiser: European Broadcasting Union (EBU)
- Scrutineer: Christine Marchal-Ortiz

Production
- Host broadcaster: Israel Broadcasting Authority (IBA)
- Director: Hagai Mautner
- Executive producer: Amnon Barkai
- Presenters: Dafna Dekel; Yigal Ravid; Sigal Shachmon

Participants
- Number of entries: 23
- Returning countries: Austria; Bosnia and Herzegovina; Denmark; Iceland; Lithuania
- Non-returning countries: Finland; Greece; Hungary; Macedonia; Romania; Slovakia; Switzerland
- Participation map: Competing countries Relegated countries unable to participate due to poor results in previous contests Countries that participated in the past but not in 1999

Vote
- Voting system: Each country awarded 12, 10, 8–1 points to their ten favourite songs
- Winning song: Sweden; "Take Me to Your Heaven"

The Eurovision Song Contest 1999 was the 44th edition of the Eurovision Song Contest, held on 29 May 1999 at the International Convention Centre in Jerusalem, Israel, and presented by Dafna Dekel, Yigal Ravid, and Sigal Shachmon. It was organised by the European Broadcasting Union (EBU) and host broadcaster Israel Broadcasting Authority (IBA), who staged the event after winning the 1998 contest for Israel with the song "Diva" by Dana International.

Broadcasters from twenty-three countries participated in the contest. Finland, Greece, Macedonia, Romania, Slovakia, and Switzerland, having participated in the 1998 contest, were absent due to being relegated after achieving the lowest average points totals over the past five contests, while Hungary actively chose not to return. Meanwhile Austria, Bosnia and Herzegovina, Denmark, and Iceland returned to the contest, having last participated in 1997, while Lithuania made its first contest appearance since 1994.

The winner was Sweden with the song "Take Me to Your Heaven", composed by Lars Diedricson, written by Gert Lengstrand and Marcos Ubeda and performed by Charlotte Nilsson. Iceland, Germany, Croatia, and Israel rounded out the top five, with Iceland achieving its best ever result and Croatia equalling its previous best. It was the first contest since 1977 that countries were allowed to perform in the language of their choice, and not necessarily the language of their country. It was also the first ever contest not to feature an orchestra or live music accompanying the competing entries.

== Location ==
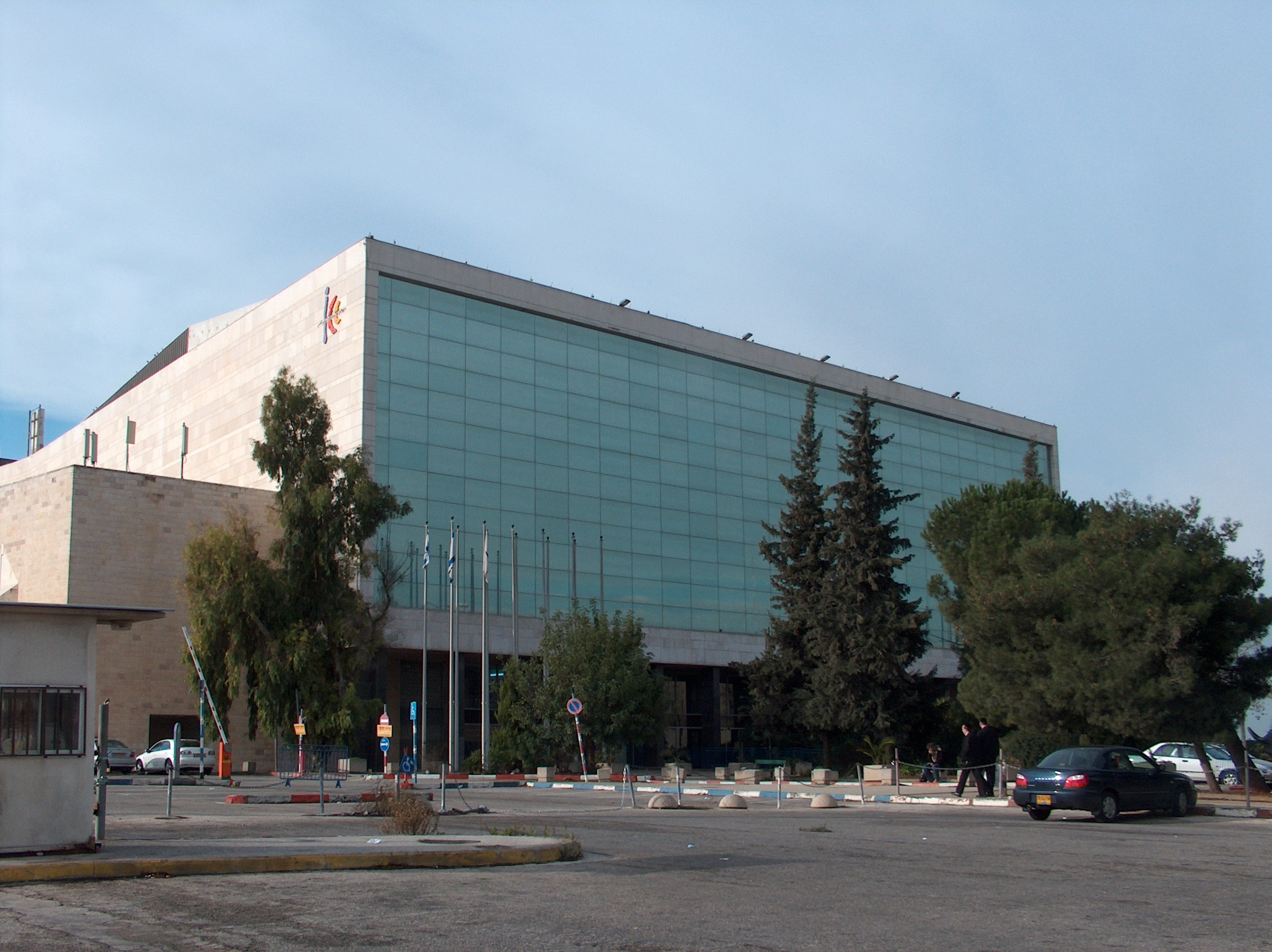
International Convention Centre, Jerusalem – host venue of the 1999 contest

The 1999 contest took place in Jerusalem, Israel, following the country's victory at the 1998 edition with the song "Diva", performed by Dana International. It was the second time that the contest was staged in Israel, following the 1979 contest also held in Jerusalem. The selected venue was the Ussishkin Auditorium of the International Convention Centre, commonly known in Hebrew as Binyenei HaUma (Hebrew: בנייני האומה), which also served as the host venue for the 1979 contest.

The prospect of the contest being staged in Israel resulted in protest by members of the Orthodox Jewish community in the country, including opposition by the deputy mayor of Jerusalem Haim Miller to the contest being staged in the city, because the 1998 competition had been won by an Israeli transsexual, and because a dress rehearsal for the 1999 contest was planned to be held during the Jewish sabbath. Additional concerns over funding for the event also contributed to speculation that the contest could be moved to Malta or the United Kingdom, the countries which had finished in the top three alongside Israel the previous year. Financial guarantees by the Israeli government however helped to ensure that the contest would take place in Israel. The possibility of holding the event in an open air venue was discussed, however concerns over security led to the choice of an indoor venue for the event. A tight security presence was felt during the rehearsal week as a precaution against potential disruption from Palestinian militant groups.

== Participants ==
Eurovision Song Contest 1999 – Participation summaries by country
- Austria; Belgium; Bosnia and Herzegovina; Croatia; Cyprus; Denmark; Estonia; France; Germany; Iceland; Ireland; Israel; Lithuania; Malta; Netherlands; Norway; Poland; Portugal; Slovenia; Spain; Sweden; Turkey; United Kingdom

Per the rules of the contest, twenty-three countries were allowed to participate in the event, a reduction from the twenty-five which took part in the 1997 and 1998 contests. Lithuania made its first appearance since 1994, and Austria, Bosnia and Herzegovina, Denmark, and Iceland returned after being relegated from the previous year's event. Russia was unable to return from relegation due to failing to broadcast the 1998 contest, as specified in the rules for that edition. 1998 participants Finland, Greece, Hungary, Macedonia, Romania, Slovakia, and Switzerland were absent from this edition.

Several of the performers taking part in the contest had previously competed as lead artists in past editions. Two artists returned as lead artists in this year's event: Doris Dragović representing Croatia had represented Yugoslavia in 1986; and Darja Švajger representing Slovenia had represented her country in 1995. A number of former competitors also returned to perform as backing vocalists for some of the competing entries: Stefán Hilmarsson, who represented Iceland in 1988 and in 1991, provided backing vocals for Selma; Kenny Lübcke, who represented Denmark in 1992, returned to provide backing for Trine Jepsen and Michael Teschl; Christopher Scicluna and Moira Stafrace, who represented Malta in 1994, provided backing for Times Three; Gabriel Forss, who represented Sweden in 1997 as a member of the group Blond, was among Charlotte Nilsson's backing vocalists; and Linda Williams, who represented the Netherlands in 1981, returned as a backing vocalist for Vanessa Chinitor. Additionally, Evelin Samuel represented Estonia in this year's contest, having previously served as backing vocalist for the country in 1997.

Eurovision Song Contest 1999 participants
Country	Broadcaster	Artist	Song	Language	Songwriter(s)
Austria	ORF	Bobbie Singer	"Reflection"	English	Dave Moskin
Belgium	VRT	Vanessa Chinitor	"Like the Wind"	English	Ilia Beyers; Wim Claes; Emma Philippa Hjälmås; John Terra
Bosnia and Herzegovina	RTVBiH	Dino and Béatrice	"Putnici"	Bosnian, French	Dino Dervišhalidović
Croatia	HRT	Doris	"Marija Magdalena"	Croatian	Tonči Huljić; Vjekoslava Huljić
Cyprus	CyBC	Marlain	"Tha'ne erotas" (Θα'ναι έρωτας)	Greek	George Kallis; Andreas Karanicolas
Denmark	DR	Trine Jepsen and Michael Teschl	"This Time I Mean It"	English	Ebbe Ravn
Estonia	ETV	Evelin Samuel and Camille	"Diamond of Night"	English	Maian-Anna Kärmas; Priit Pajusaar; Glen Pilvre; Kaari Sillamaa
France	France Télévision	Nayah	"Je veux donner ma voix"	French	Gilles Arcens; René Colombies; Pascal Graczyk; Luigi Rutigliano
Germany	NDR (Note: On behalf of the German public broadcasting consortium ARD)	Sürpriz	"Journey to Jerusalem – Kudüs'e Seyahat"	German, Turkish, English	Bernd Meinunger; Ralph Siegel
Iceland	RÚV	Selma	"All Out of Luck"	English	Selma Björnsdóttir; Sveinbjörn I. Baldvinsson; Þorvaldur Bjarni Þorvaldsson
Ireland	RTÉ	The Mullans	"When You Need Me"	English	Bronagh Mullan
Israel	IBA	Eden	"Happy Birthday"	English, Hebrew	Gabriel Butler; Moshe Datz; Ya'akov Lamai; Jacky Oved
Lithuania	LRT	Aistė	"Strazdas"	Samogitian	Sigitas Geda; Linas Rimša
Malta	PBS	Times Three	"Believe 'n Peace"	English	Christopher Scicluna; Moira Stafrace
Netherlands	NOS	Marlayne	"One Good Reason"	English	Alan Michael; Tjeerd van Zanen
Norway	NRK	Van Eijk	"Living My Life Without You"	English	Stig André van Eijk
Poland	TVP	Mietek Szcześniak	"Przytul mnie mocno"	Polish	Seweryn Krajewski; Wojciech Ziembicki
Portugal	RTP	Rui Bandeira	"Como tudo começou"	Portuguese	Tó Andrade; Jorge do Carmo
Slovenia	RTVSLO	Darja Švajger	"For a Thousand Years"	English	Primož Peterca
Spain	TVE	Lydia	"No quiero escuchar"	Spanish	Adolfo Carmona Zamarreno; Carlos López González; Alejandro Piqueras Ramírez; Fernando Rodríguez Fernández
Sweden	SVT	Charlotte Nilsson	"Take Me to Your Heaven"	English	Lars Diedricson; Gert Lengstrand; Marcos Ubeda
Turkey	TRT	Tuba Önal and Grup Mistik	"Dön Artık"	Turkish	Canan Tunç; Erdinç Tunç
United Kingdom	BBC	Precious	"Say It Again"	English	Paul Varney

=== Qualification ===
Due to the high number of countries wishing to enter the contest, a relegation system was introduced in 1993 in order to reduce the number of countries which could compete in each year's contest. Any relegated countries would be able to return the following year, thus allowing all countries the opportunity to compete in at least one in every two editions. The relegation rules introduced for the 1997 contest were again utilised ahead of the 1999 contest, based on each country's average points total in previous contests. The twenty-three participants were made up of the previous year's winning country and host nation, the seventeen countries other than the host which had obtained the highest average points total over the preceding five contests, and any eligible countries which had not competed in the 1998 contest. In cases where the average was identical between two or more countries, the total number of points scored in the most recent contest determined the final order.

A new addition to the relegation rules specified that for the 2000 contest and future editions, the four countries whose broadcasters were the largest financial contributors to the contest – France, Germany, Spain, and the United Kingdom – would automatically qualify for each year's event and be exempt from relegation. This new "Big Four" group of countries was created to ensure the financial viability of the event, and was prompted by a number of poor placements in previous years for some of these countries, which if repeated in 1999 could have resulted in those countries being eliminated.

Finland, Greece, Hungary, Macedonia, Portugal, Romania, Slovakia, and Switzerland were therefore excluded from participating in the 1999 contest, to make way for the return of Austria, Bosnia and Herzegovina, Denmark, Iceland, and Lithuania, and new debuting country Latvia. However Latvia's Latvijas Televīzija subsequently withdrew its participation at a late stage, and its place in the contest was subsequently offered to Hungary as the excluded country with the highest average points total. Hungarian broadcaster Magyar Televízió declined and the offer was then passed to Portugal's Radiotelevisão Portuguesa as the next in line, which accepted.

The calculations used to determine the countries relegated for the 1999 contest are outlined in the table below.

Table key

Qualifier
‡ Automatic qualifier
† Returning countries which did not compete in 1998

Calculation of average points to determine qualification for the 1999 contest (Note: Determined by totalling all points awarded in the past five contests and dividing by the number of times that country had participated. 1996 did not count as a participation for countries that didn't qualify from the qualification round.)
Rank	Country	Average	Yearly Point Totals				
Rank	Country	Average	1994	1995	1996	1997	1998
1	Ireland	130.60	226	44	162	157	64
2	Israel ‡	126.50	R	81	DNQ		172
3	United Kingdom	121.80	63	76	77	227	166
4	Malta	94.40	97	76	68	66	165
5	Norway	83.40	76	148	114	0	79
6	Croatia	74.20	27	91	98	24	131
7 (Note: Despite having the same average score, Sweden ranked higher than Cyprus by virtue of achieving a higher score in the most recent contest.)	Sweden	67.40	48	100	100	36	53
8	Cyprus	67.40	51	79	72	98	37
9 (Note: Despite having the same average score, the Netherlands ranked higher than Germany by virtue of achieving a higher score in the most recent contest.)	Netherlands	59.25	4	R	78	5	150
10	Germany	59.25	128	1	DNQ	22	86
11	Denmark †	58.50	R	92	DNQ	25	R
12	Poland	57.00	166	15	31	54	19
13	France	56.80	74	94	18	95	3
14	Turkey	56.00	R	21	57	121	25
15	Spain	54.00	17	119	17	96	21
16	Estonia	53.50	2	R	94	82	36
17	Belgium	50.67	R	8	22	R	122
18	Slovenia	44.25	R	84	16	60	17
19	Hungary (Note: As Latvia withdrew its participation at a late stage the eliminated country with the highest average points total, Hungary, was offered its place. After declining the offer, the place subsequently passed to Portugal as the country with the next highest average points total.)	42.00	122	3	DNQ	39	4
20	Austria †	41.50	19	67	68	12	R
21	Portugal	41.20	73	5	92	0	36
22	Greece	39.80	44	68	36	39	12
23	Iceland †	37.25	49	31	51	18	R
24	Bosnia and Herzegovina †	22.00	39	14	13	22	R
25	Macedonia	16.00			DNQ	R	16
26 (Note: Despite having the same average score, Finland ranked higher than Slovakia by virtue of achieving a higher score in the most recent contest.)	Finland	14.00	11	R	9	R	22
27	Slovakia	14.00	15	R	19	R	8
28	Switzerland	10.50	15	R	22	5	0
29	Romania	10.00	14	R	DNQ	R	6
30	Lithuania †	0.00	0			R	

== Production ==
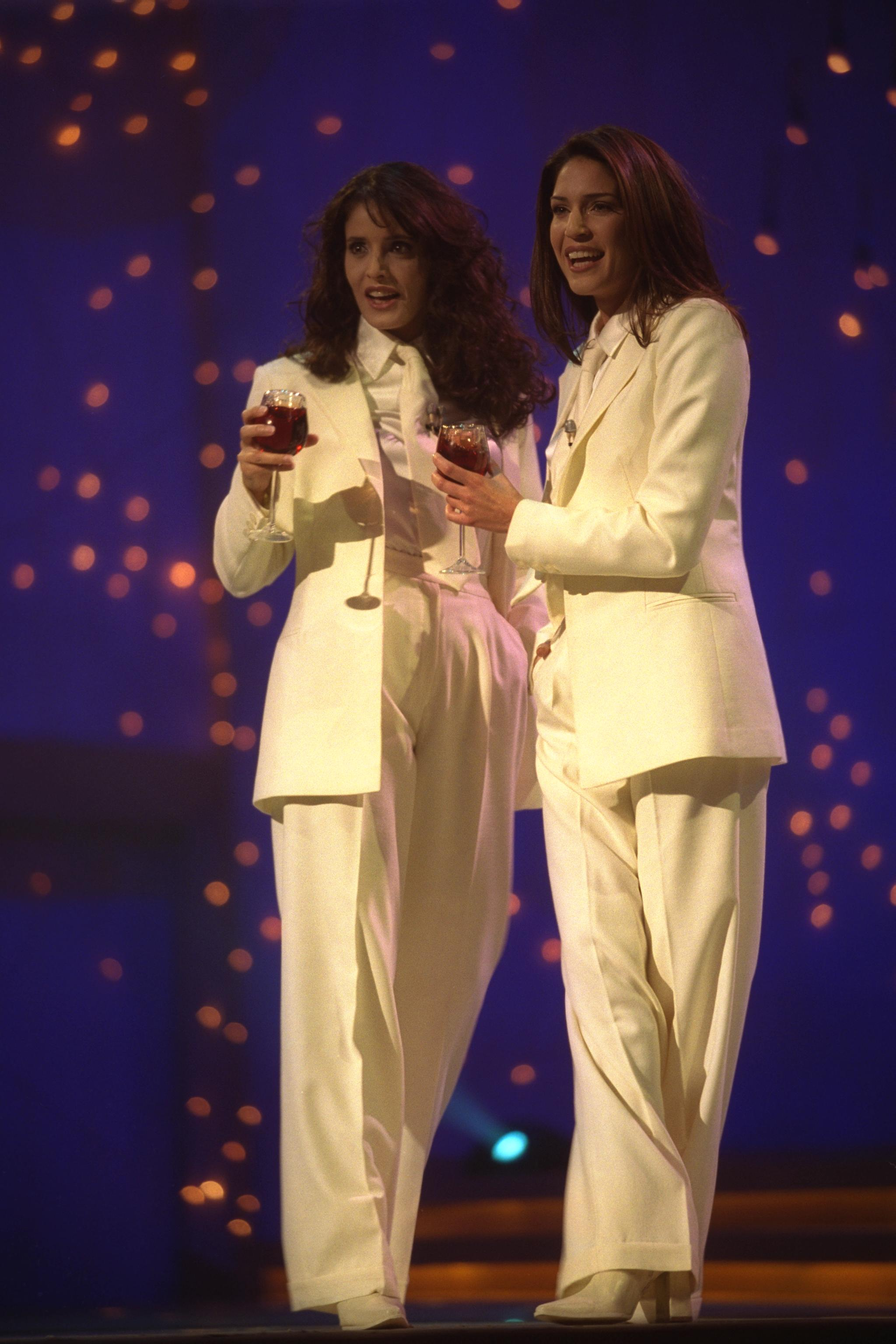
Two of the hosts Dafna Dekel (left) and Sigal Shachmon, during the contest

The Eurovision Song Contest 1999 was produced by the Israel Broadcasting Authority (IBA). Amnon Barkai served as executive producer, Aharon Goldfinger-Eldar served as producer, Hagai Mautner served as director, and Maya Hanoch, Mia Raveh and Ronen Levin served as designers. On behalf of the European Broadcasting Union (EBU), the event was overseen by Christine Marchal-Ortiz as scrutineer. Usually able to hold a maximum of 3,000 people, modifications made to the Ussishkin Auditorium reduced the capacity to around 2,000 for the contest, with rows of seats removed from the floor to make room for the stage and from the balcony to allow for the construction of boxes for use by various commentators.

Rehearsals in the venue for the competing acts began on 24 May 1999. Each country had two technical rehearsals in the week approaching the contest: the first rehearsals took place on 24 and 25 May, with each country allowed 40 minutes total on stage followed by a 20 minute press conference; the second rehearsals subsequently took place on 26 and 27 May, with each country allocated 30 minutes on stage. Each country took to the stage in the order in which they would perform, however the Lithuanian delegation was permitted to arrive in Israel one day later than the other delegations due to budget concerns. Subsequently the first day's rehearsals began with Belgium as the second country to perform in the contest, with the Lithuania delegation being the last to complete its first rehearsal on the second day; the order of rehearsals was corrected for the second rehearsals, with Lithuania scheduled as the first delegation on stage. Additional rehearsals took place on 26 May for the contest's concluding performance with all artists, and on 27 May for the contest's presenters and to test the voting scoreboard's computer graphics. Two dress rehearsals held on 28 May were held with an audience, the second of which was also recorded as a production stand-by in case of problems during the live contest. A further dress rehearsal took place on the afternoon of 29 May ahead of the live contest, followed by security and technical checks.

The singer Dafna Dekel, the radio and television presenter Yigal Ravid and the model and television presenter Sigal Shachmon were the presenters of the 1999 contest, the first edition to feature three presenters in a single show. Dekel had previously represented Israel in 1992 and placed sixth with the song "Ze Rak Sport". The writers of the winning song were awarded with a trophy designed by Yaacov Agam, which was presented by the previous year's winning artist Dana International.

A compilation album featuring many of the competing entries was released in Israel following the contest, commissioned by IBA and released through the Israeli record label IMP Records. The release contained nineteen of the twenty-three competing acts on CD and an additional video CD with clips from the televised broadcast and footage from backstage.

== Format ==
=== Entries ===
Each participating broadcaster was represented in the contest by one song, no longer than three minutes in duration. A maximum of six performers were allowed on stage during each country's performance, and all performers were required to be at least 16 years old in the year of the contest. Selected entries were not permitted to be released commercially before 1 January 1999, and were then only allowed to be released in the country they represented until after the contest was held. Entries were required to be selected by each country's participating broadcaster by 15 March, and the final submission date for all selected entries to be received by the contest organisers was set for 29 March. This submission was required to include a sound recording of the entry and backing track for use during the contest, a video presentation of the song on stage being performed by the artists, and the text of the song lyrics in its original language and translations in French and English for distribution to the participating broadcasters, their commentators and juries.

For the first time since the 1976 contest the participants had full freedom to perform in any language, and not simply that of the country they represented. (Note: Although at the 1977 contest each participant was required to perform in the language of the country they represented, Germany and Belgium were granted exceptions as their entries had already been chosen when the rule was reintroduced.) This led to a marked increase in the number of entries which were performed in English. Additionally, the rules were modified to make the orchestra a non-obligatory feature of the contest of which organising broadcasters were free to opt out. IBA chose not to provide an orchestra, with all entries subsequently being performed with backing tracks, and no orchestra has been included as part of the competition since.

Following the confirmation of the twenty-three competing countries, the draw to determine the running order was held on 17 November 1998.

=== Voting procedure ===
The results of the 1999 contest were determined using the scoring system introduced in 1975: each country awarded twelve points to its favourite entry, followed by ten points to its second favourite, and then awarded points in decreasing value from eight to one for the remaining songs which featured in the country's top ten, with countries unable to vote for their own entry. Each participating broadcaster was required to use televoting to determine their points, with viewers able to register their vote by telephone for a total of five minutes following the performance of the last competing entry. Viewers could vote by calling one of twenty-two different telephone numbers to represent the twenty-three competing entries except that which represented their own country. Once phone lines were opened a video recap containing short clips of each competing entry with the accompanying phone number for voting was shown in order to aid viewers during the voting window. Systems were also put in place to prevent lobby groups from one country voting for their entry by travelling to other countries.

Participating broadcasters which were unable to hold a televote in its country due to technological limitations were granted an exception, and their points were determined by an assembled jury of eight individuals, which was required to be split evenly between members of the public and music professionals, comprised additionally of an equal number of men and women, and below and above 30 years of age. Participating broadcasters using televoting were also required to appoint a back-up jury of the same composition which would be called into action upon technical failure preventing the televote results from being used. Each jury member voted in secret and awarded between one and ten votes to each participating song, excluding that from their own country and with no abstentions permitted. The votes of each member were collected following the country's performance and then tallied by the non-voting jury chairperson to determine the points to be awarded. In any cases where two or more songs in the top ten received the same number of votes, a show of hands by all jury members was used to determine the final placing; if a tie still remained, the youngest jury member would have the deciding vote.

=== Postcards ===
Each entry was preceded by a video postcard which served as an introduction to each country, as well as providing an opportunity to showcase the running artistic theme of the event and to create a transition between entries to allow stage crew to make changes on stage. The postcards for the 1999 contest featured animations of paintings of biblical stories which transitioned into footage of modern locations in Israel or clips representing specific themes related to contemporary Israeli culture and industries. The various locations or themes for each postcard are listed below by order of performance:

1. Lithuania – Jacob's Ladder; Israel Museum, Jerusalem
2. Belgium – Pharaoh and his Army; Eilat
3. Spain – Noah's Ark; landscapes of Galilee
4. Croatia – Ruth; Israeli agriculture
5. United Kingdom – Jonah and the Whale; Jaffa
6. Slovenia – Adam and Eve; Israeli fashion
7. Turkey – The Sea of Galilee; Tiberias and surroundings
8. Norway – Workers of the Tabernacle; Israeli tech and virtual reality
9. Denmark – Joseph and His Brothers; Haifa
10. France – The Golden Calf; Israeli jewellery industry
11. Netherlands – The Prophet; Tel Aviv nightlife
12. Poland – David and Goliath; Israeli sports
13. Iceland – The Manna from Heaven; Israeli culinary
14. Cyprus – The Basket of Moses; rafting on the Jordan River
15. Sweden – David and Bathsheba; music and art on the roofs of Tel Aviv
16. Portugal – Daniel and the Lions; Acre
17. Ireland – Cain and Abel; Judaean Desert
18. Austria – The Judgement of Solomon; Jerusalem
19. Israel – The Promised Land; Jezreel Valley
20. Malta – David and Michal; Suzanne Dellal Centre for Dance and Theatre, Tel Aviv
21. Germany – The Tower of Babel; Israeli beaches
22. Bosnia and Herzegovina – Samson; Caesarea National Park
23. Estonia – The Zodiac mosaic at the Old Beth Alfa Synagogue; love at the Dead Sea

== Contest overview ==
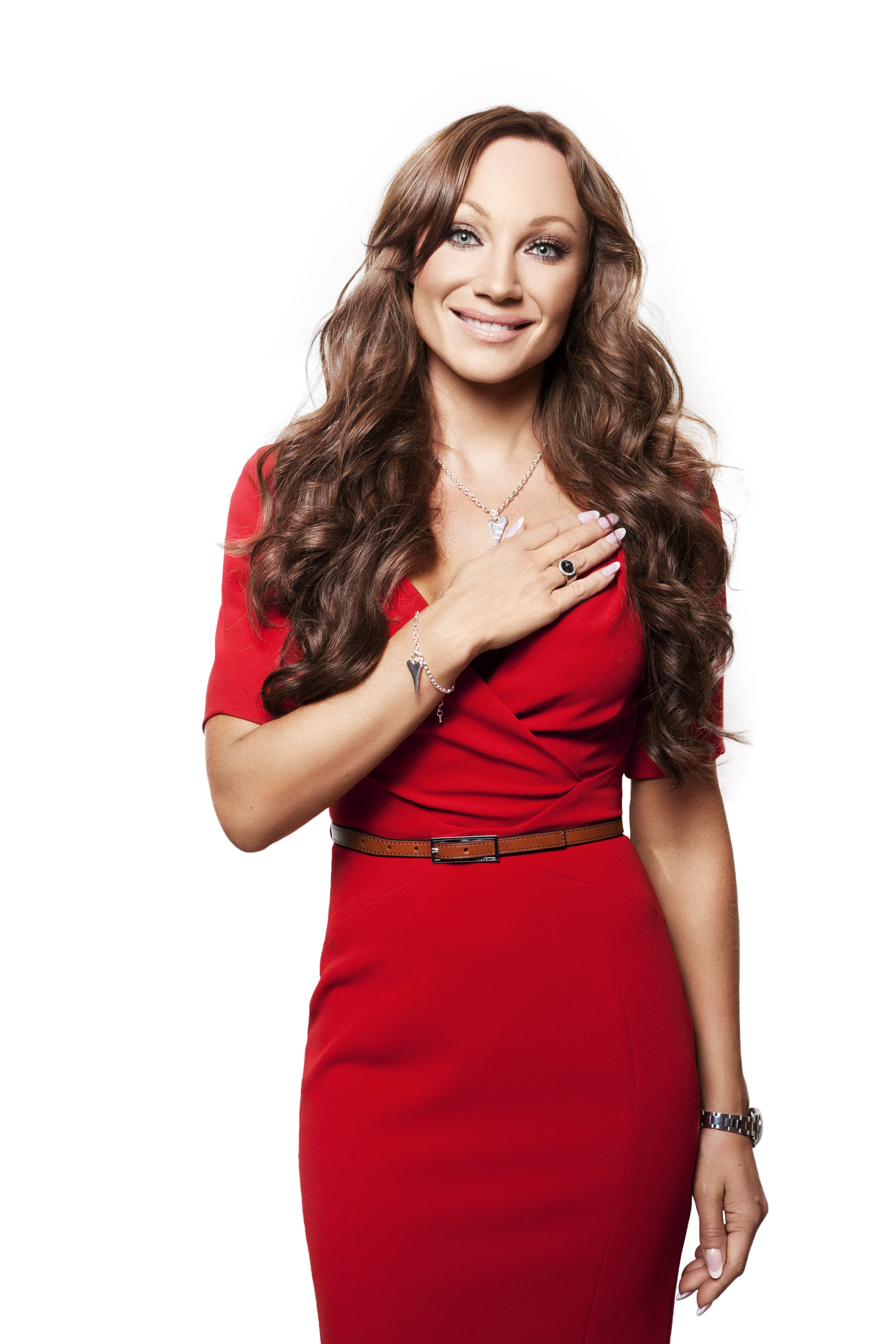
Charlotte Nilsson (pictured in 2012) brought Sweden its fourth Eurovision victory.

The contest took place on 29 May 1999 at 22:00 (IST) and lasted 3 hours and 13 minutes.

The show began with a computer animation entitled "From Birmingham to Jerusalem", highlighting the contest's journey from last year's host country the United Kingdom to Israel, and containing notable landmarks and features of the competing countries; the animation then transitioned into recorded footage of Jerusalem including dancers and hosts Dekel and Shachmon. The contest's opening segment also featured Izhar Cohen and Gali Atari, previous Eurovision winning artists for Israel in 1978 and in 1979 attending as special guests, and the previous year's co-presenter Terry Wogan in attendance as the United Kingdom's television commentator. A pause between entries was included for the first time to allow broadcasters to provide advertisements during the show; placed between the Polish and Icelandic entries, a performance of the song "To Life" from the musical Fiddler on the Roof featuring co-presenters Dekel and Shachmon was provided for the benefit of the audience in the arena and for non-commercial broadcasters.

The contest's pre-recorded interval act entitled "Freedom Calls", shown following the final competing entry and during the voting window, was staged outside the Walls of Jerusalem and the Tower of David and featured performances by a troupe of dancers, a chorus and Dana International singing the D'ror Yikra and a cover of "Free", originally recorded by Stevie Wonder. Following the traditional reprise performance of the winning song, the show finished with a performance of the English version of Israel's 1979 contest winning song "Hallelujah", which included all the competing artists and was featured as a tribute to the victims of the then-ongoing Kosovo War and to the people of the Balkans impacted.

The winner was Sweden represented by the song "Take Me to Your Heaven", composed by Lars Diedricson, written by Gert Lengstrand and Marcos Ubeda and performed by Charlotte Nilsson. This marked Sweden's fourth victory in the contest, following wins in 1974, 1984, and 1991, and occurred 25 years after ABBA brought Sweden its first victory. Iceland, Croatia, and Bosnia and Herzegovina also achieved their best results to date, placing second, fourth and seventh respectively.

During the presentation of the trophy to the contest winners, Dana International caused a security alert in the auditorium as while lifting the trophy she lost her balance and fell to the stage along with the winning songwriters before being helped up by security agents.

The Norwegian delegation raised an objection to the use of simulated male vocals during the performance of Croatian entry "Marija Magdalena". Following the contest this was found to have contravened the contest rules regarding the use of vocals on the backing tracks, and Croatia were sanctioned by the EBU with the loss of 33% of its points for the purpose of calculating its average points total for qualification in following contests. The country's position and points at this contest however remain unchanged.

The table below outlines the participating countries, the order in which they performed, the competing artists and songs, and the results of the voting.

Results of the Eurovision Song Contest 1999
R/O	Country	Artist	Song	Points	Place
1	Lithuania	Aistė	"Strazdas"	13	20
2	Belgium	Vanessa Chinitor	"Like the Wind"	38	12
3	Spain	Lydia	"No quiero escuchar"	1	23
4	Croatia	Doris	"Marija Magdalena"	118	4
5	United Kingdom	Precious	"Say It Again"	38	12
6	Slovenia	Darja Švajger	"For a Thousand Years"	50	11
7	Turkey	Tuba Önal and Grup Mistik	"Dön Artık"	21	16
8	Norway	Van Eijk	"Living My Life Without You"	35	14
9	Denmark	Trine Jepsen and Michael Teschl	"This Time I Mean It"	71	8
10	France	Nayah	"Je veux donner ma voix"	14	19
11	Netherlands	Marlayne	"One Good Reason"	71	8
12	Poland	Mietek Szcześniak	"Przytul mnie mocno"	17	18
13	Iceland	Selma	"All Out of Luck"	146	2
14	Cyprus	Marlain	"Tha'ne erotas"	2	22
15	Sweden	Charlotte Nilsson	"Take Me to Your Heaven"	163	1
16	Portugal	Rui Bandeira	"Como tudo começou"	12	21
17	Ireland	The Mullans	"When You Need Me"	18	17
18	Austria	Bobbie Singer	"Reflection"	65	10
19	Israel	Eden	"Happy Birthday"	93	5
20	Malta	Times Three	"Believe 'n Peace"	32	15
21	Germany	Sürpriz	"Journey to Jerusalem – Kudüs'e Seyahat"	140	3
22	Bosnia and Herzegovina	Dino and Béatrice	"Putnici"	86	7
23	Estonia	Evelin Samuel and Camille	"Diamond of Night"	90	6

=== Spokespersons ===
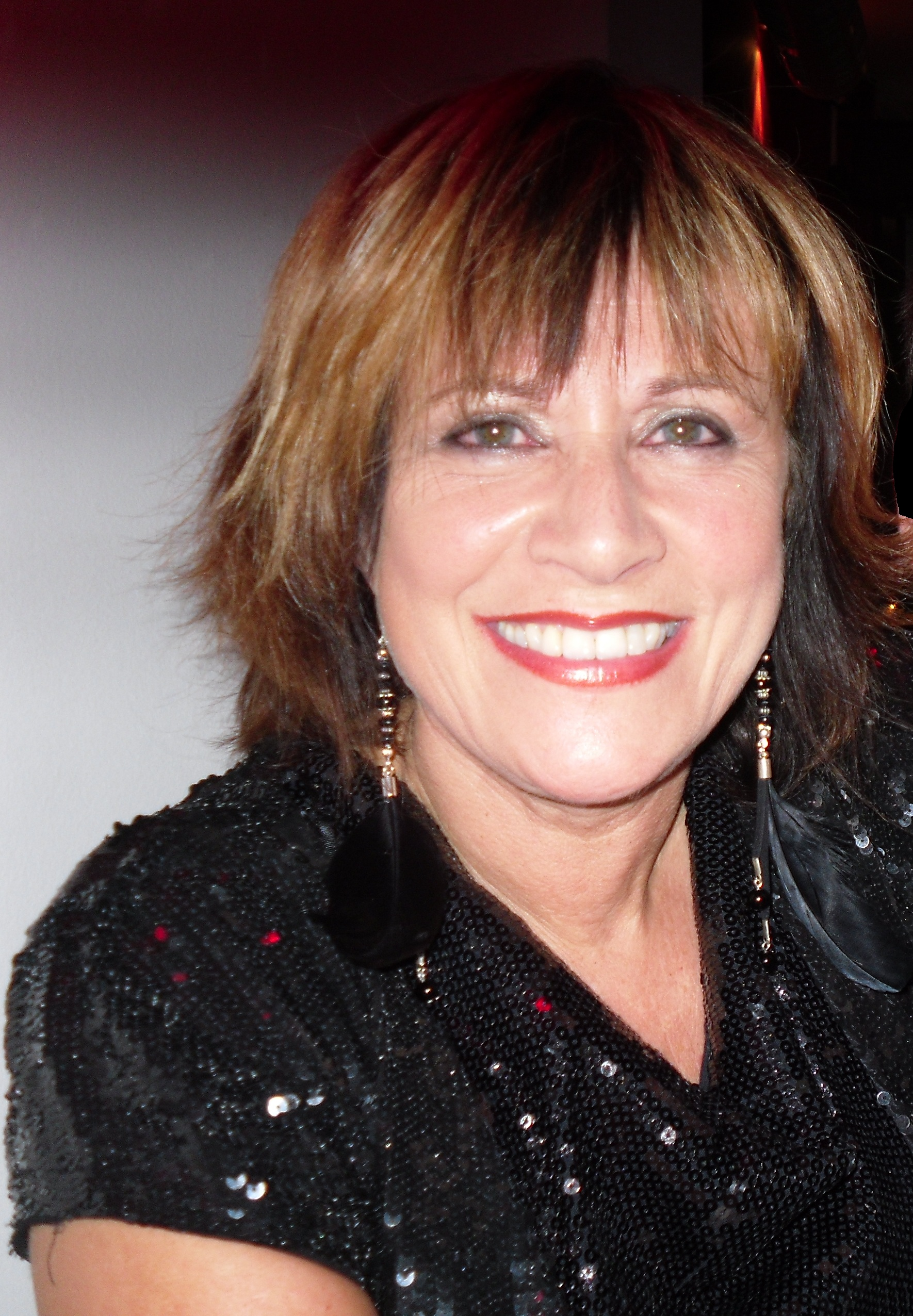
Three-time Eurovision participant Kirsten Siggaard announced the points from Denmark.

Each participating broadcaster appointed a spokesperson who was responsible for announcing, in English or French, the votes for its respective country. As had been the case since the 1994 contest, the spokespersons were connected via satellite and appeared in vision during the broadcast; spokespersons at the 1999 contest are listed below.

1. Lithuania – Andrius Tapinas
2. Belgium – Sabine De Vos
3. Spain – Hugo de Campos
4. Croatia – Marko Rašica
5. United Kingdom – Colin Berry
6. Slovenia – Mira Berginc
7. Turkey – Osman Erkan
8. Norway – Ragnhild Sælthun Fjørtoft
9. Denmark – Kirsten Siggaard
10. France – Marie Myriam
11. Netherlands – Edsilia Rombley
12. Poland – Jan Chojnacki
13. Iceland – Áslaug Dóra Eyjólfsdóttir
14. Cyprus – Marina Maleni
15. Sweden – Pontus Gårdinger
16. Portugal – Manuel Luís Goucha
17. Ireland – Clare McNamara
18. Austria – Dodo Roscic
19. Israel – Yoav Ginai
20. Malta – Nirvana Azzopardi
21. Germany – Renan Demirkan
22. Bosnia and Herzegovina – Segmedina Srna
23. Estonia – Mart Sander

== Detailed voting results ==
Televoting was used to determine the points awarded by all countries, except Lithuania, Turkey, Ireland, and Bosnia and Herzegovina. Ireland had intended to use televoting, however technical failures at Telecom Éireann ahead of the voting window meant that the majority of calls were not registered and the country's back-up jury was utilised to determine its points.

The announcement of the results from each country was conducted in the order in which they performed, with the spokespersons announcing their country's points in English or French in ascending order. The detailed breakdown of the points awarded by each country is listed in the tables below.

Detailed voting results of the Eurovision Song Contest 1999
Voting procedure used: 100% televoting 100% jury vote		Total score	Lithuania	Belgium	Spain	Croatia	United Kingdom	Slovenia	Turkey	Norway	Denmark	France	Netherlands	Poland	Iceland	Cyprus	Sweden	Portugal	Ireland	Austria	Israel	Malta	Germany	Bosnia and Herzegovina	Estonia
Contestants	Lithuania	13				2										5					3	1			2
Contestants	Belgium	38				4						2	10	2					10		5				5
Contestants	Spain	1				1																			
Contestants	Croatia	118	6	5	**12**			**12**	8			7	1	7	4	2	1	6	6	8	7	5	10	8	3
Contestants	United Kingdom	38	5		4	5		2	4		1					4					4	8		1	
Contestants	Slovenia	50	10	2	2	**12**						1	6						**12**					5	
Contestants	Turkey	21								4		5											**12**		
Contestants	Norway	35				7					6				7	7	5		3						
Contestants	Denmark	71			5		5	5						1	**12**	8	8	3	7	5	2	4			6
Contestants	France	14	2						2	8									2						
Contestants	Netherlands	71	4	**12**	3		8	3	5		7				6		4	2	1	4	6	2		4	
Contestants	Poland	17	7																				4	6	
Contestants	Iceland	146	8	8	10		10		10	10	**12**		7	4		**12**	**12**	4	4	2	10	10	3		10
Contestants	Cyprus	2					2																		
Contestants	Sweden	**163**	3	7	6		**12**	7	6	**12**	10	3	8	6	10	6		10	5	6	8	**12**	2	**12**	**12**
Contestants	Portugal	12										**12**													
Contestants	Ireland	18	**12**				4		1	1															
Contestants	Austria	65		6			7	4		6	3		2	3	8	1	7	5					5		8
Contestants	Israel	93		3	8	8		1	3	2	2	10	4	10	1	10	3	8		1		6	7	2	4
Contestants	Malta	32				6	6									3		1		7			1	7	1
Contestants	Germany	140		10	7	3	1	6	**12**	3	5	8	**12**	**12**	5		2	**12**		10	**12**	3		10	7
Contestants	Bosnia and Herzegovina	86		1		10		10	7	7	8	6	3	5	3		6			**12**			8		
Contestants	Estonia	90	1	4	1		3	8		5	4	4	5	8	2		10	7	8	3	1	7	6	3	

=== 12 points ===
The below table summarises how the maximum 12 points were awarded from one country to another. The winning country is shown in bold. Sweden and Germany each received the maximum score of 12 points from five countries, with Iceland receiving three sets of 12 points, Croatia and Slovenia receiving two sets each, and Bosnia and Herzegovina, Denmark, Ireland, Netherlands, Portugal, and Turkey each receiving one maximum score.

Distribution of 12 points awarded at the Eurovision Song Contest 1999
N.	Contestant	Nation(s) giving 12 points
5	**Sweden**	Bosnia and Herzegovina, Estonia, Malta, Norway, United Kingdom
5	Germany	Israel, Netherlands, Poland, Portugal, Turkey
3	Iceland	Cyprus, Denmark, Sweden
2	Croatia	Slovenia, Spain
2	Slovenia	Croatia, Ireland
1	Bosnia and Herzegovina	Austria
1	Denmark	Iceland
1	Ireland	Lithuania
1	Netherlands	Belgium
1	Portugal	France
1	Turkey	Germany

== Broadcasts ==
Each participating broadcaster was required to relay live and in full the contest via television. Non-participating EBU member broadcasters were also able to relay the contest as "passive participants"; any passive countries wishing to participate in the following year's event were also required to provide a live broadcast of the contest or a deferred broadcast within 24 hours. Broadcasters were able to send commentators to provide coverage of the contest in their own native language and to relay information about the artists and songs to their television viewers. These commentators were typically sent to the venue to report on the event, and were able to provide commentary from small booths constructed at the back of the venue.

The contest was reportedly watched by 150 million viewers. Known details on the broadcasts in each country, including the specific broadcasting stations and commentators, are shown in the tables below.

Broadcasters and commentators in participating countries
Country	Broadcaster	Channel(s)	Commentator(s)	Ref.
Austria	ORF	ORF 1	Andi Knoll	
Austria	ORF	FM4	Stermann & Grissemann	
Belgium	VRT	TV1	André Vermeulen and Bart Peeters	
Belgium	RTBF	RTBF La 1	Jean-Pierre Hautier	
Croatia	HRT	HRT 1	Aleksandar Kostadinov	
Cyprus	CyBC	RIK 1		
Denmark	DR	DR1	Keld Heick	
Estonia	ETV		Marko Reikop	
Estonia	ER	Raadio 2	Marko Reikop	
France	France Télévision	France 3 (Note: Additional deferred broadcast on TV5 Europe at 00:05 (CEST))	Julien Lepers	
Germany	ARD	Das Erste	Peter Urban	
Iceland	RÚV	Sjónvarpið, Rás 2	Gísli Marteinn Baldursson	
Ireland	RTÉ	RTÉ One	Pat Kenny	
Ireland	RTÉ	RTÉ Radio 1	Larry Gogan	
Israel	IBA	Channel 1		
Lithuania	LRT	LRT	Darius Užkuraitis	
Malta	PBS	TVM		
Netherlands	NOS	TV2	Willem van Beusekom	
Norway	NRK	NRK1	Jostein Pedersen	
Norway	NRK	NRK P1	Jon Branæs	
Poland	TVP	TVP1	Artur Orzech	
Portugal	RTP	RTP1 (Note: Additional live broadcast on RTP Internacional)	Rui Unas	
Slovenia	RTVSLO	SLO 1		
Slovenia	RTVSLO	Val 202	Andrej Karoli	
Spain	TVE	La Primera (Note: Additional live broadcast on TVE Internacional)	José Luis Uribarri	
Sweden	SVT	SVT2	Pekka Heino and Anders Berglund	
Sweden	SR	SR P3	Carolina Norén	
Turkey	TRT	TRT 1 (Note: Additional live broadcast on TRT Int)	Gülşah Banda	
United Kingdom	BBC	BBC One (Note: Additional live broadcast on BBC Prime)	Terry Wogan	
United Kingdom	BBC	BBC Radio 2	Ken Bruce	

Broadcasters and commentators in non-participating countries
Country	Broadcaster	Channel(s)	Commentator(s)	Ref.
Australia	SBS	SBS TV (Note: Deferred broadcast the following day at 20:30 (AEST))		
Canada	TV5	TV5 Québec Canada (Note: Deferred broadcast (EDT))		
Falkland Islands	BFBS	BFBS Television (Note: Deferred broadcast at 21:00 (FKT))		
Faroe Islands	SvF		Keld Heick	
Finland	YLE	TV1	Jani Juntunen	
Finland	YLE	Radio Suomi	Sanna Kojo	
Finland	YLE	Radio Vega		
Greenland	KNR	KNR		
Latvia	LTV		Kārlis Streips	
Romania	TVR	TVR 1	Doina Caramzulescu and Costin Grigore	
Romania	ROR	Radio România Actualități	Ana Maria Zaharescu	
Russia	ORT (Note: Also broadcast deferred via the Orbita satellite broadcasting system in the Russian Far East)		Olga Maksimova and Kolya MacCleod	
Russia	Jewish Channel (Note: Delayed broadcast on 5 December 1999 at 16:00 (NOVT))			
Switzerland	SRG SSR	SF 2	Sandra Studer	
Switzerland	SRG SSR	TSR 1	Jean-Marc Richard	
Switzerland	SRG SSR	TSI 2		
Switzerland	SRG SSR	DRS 1 (Note: Deferred broadcast at 22:00 (CEST))		

== Other awards ==
=== Barbara Dex Award ===
The Barbara Dex Award, created in 1997 by fansite House of Eurovision, was awarded to the performer deemed to have been the "worst dressed" among the participants. The winner in 1999 was Spain's representative Lydia, as determined by visitors to the House of Eurovision website. This was the first edition of the award to be determined by site visitors, as the winners in 1997 and 1998 had been chosen by the founders of the House of Eurovision site Edwin van Thillo and Rob Paardekam.

== Notes and references ==
=== Bibliography ===
- O'Connor, John Kennedy (2010). The Eurovision Song Contest: The Official History (2nd ed.). London, United Kingdom: Carlton Books. ISBN 978-1-84732-521-1.
- Roxburgh, Gordon (2020). Songs for Europe: The United Kingdom at the Eurovision Song Contest. Vol. Four: The 1990s. Prestatyn, United Kingdom: Telos Publishing. ISBN 978-1-84583-163-9.
- Thorsson, Leif; Verhage, Martin (2006). Melodifestivalen genom tiderna : de svenska uttagningarna och internationella finalerna [Melodifestivalen through the ages: the Swedish selections and international finals] (in Swedish). Stockholm, Sweden: Premium Publishing. pp. 266–267. ISBN 91-89136-29-2.
- Vermeulen, André (2021). Van Canzonissima tot Eurosong: 65 jaar belgische preselecties voor het Eurovisiesongfestival [From Canzonissima to Eurosong: 65 years of Belgian preselections for the Eurovision Song Contest] (in Dutch) (2nd ed.). Leuven, Belgium: Kritak. ISBN 978-94-0147-609-6.
