= Portugal in the Eurovision Song Contest 1999 =

- Eurovision Song Contest 1999
- Participating broadcaster: Radiotelevisão Portuguesa (RTP)
- Country: Portugal
- Selection process: Festival da Canção 1999
- Selection date: 8 March 1999

Competing entry
- Song: "Como tudo começou"
- Artist: Rui Bandeira
- Songwriters: Jorge do Carmo; Tó Andrade

Placement
- Final result: 21st, 12 points

Participation chronology

Portugal was represented at the Eurovision Song Contest 1999 with the song "Como tudo começou" composed by Jorge do Carmo, with lyrics by Tó Andrade, and performed by Rui Bandeira. The Portuguese participating broadcaster, Radiotelevisão Portuguesa (RTP), organised the national final Festival da Canção 1999 in order to select its entry for the contest. The competition took place on 8 March 1999 where "Como tudo começou" performed by Rui Bandeira emerged as the winner following the votes from 11 regional juries.

The song competed in the Eurovision Song Contest which took place on 29 May 1999. Performed during the show in position 16, it placed twenty-first out of the 23 participating songs from different countries, scoring 12 points.

== Background ==
Prior to the 1999 contest, Radiotelevisão Portuguesa (RTP) had participated in the Eurovision Song Contest representing Portugal thirty-four times since its first entry in 1964. Its highest placing in the contest was sixth, achieved in 1996 with the song "O meu coração não tem cor" performed by Lúcia Moniz. Its least successful result has been last place, which it has achieved on three occasions, most recently in 1997 with the song "Antes do adeus" performed by Célia Lawson. The Portuguese entry has also received nul points on two occasions; in 1964 and 1997.

RTP has traditionally selected its entry for the Eurovision Song Contest via the music competition Festival da Canção, with an exception in 1988 when it selected its entry internally. The broadcaster organized Festival da Canção 1999 in order to select the 1999 Portuguese entry.

== Before Eurovision ==
=== Festival da Canção 1999 ===
Festival da Canção 1999 was the 36th edition of Festival da Canção that selected the Portuguese entry for the Eurovision Song Contest 1999. Eight entries, selected by a jury panel consisting of RTP representatives Nuno Figueira and Paula Velez, singer Anabela, conductor José Marinho and Antena 1 presenter Armando Carvalheda, from 400 submissions received through an open call for songs, competed in the competition which took place at Sala Tejo of the Pavilhão Atlântico in Lisbon on 8 March 1999, hosted by Manuel Luís Goucha and Alexandra Lencastre and broadcast on RTP1 and RTP Internacional as well as on radio via Antena 1. The winner, "Como tudo começou" performed by Rui Bandeira, was selected based on the votes of 11 regional juries.

Final – 8 March 1999
| R/O | Artist | Song | Songwriter(s) | Conductor | Points | Place |
|---|---|---|---|---|---|---|
| 1 | Tempo | "Uma parte de mim" | Samuel Lopes | Reginaldo S. Neves | 51 | 5 |
| 2 | Liliana Pinheiro | "Eu, tu e nós" | Tó Sanches, Liliana Pinheiro, Rui Bagulho | José Marinho | 32 | 7 |
| 3 | Francisco Ceia | "Romanzeira" | Francisco Ceia | José Marinho | 21 | 8 |
| 4 | Rui Bandeira | "Como tudo começou" | Tó Andrade, Jorge do Carmo | José Marinho | 90 | 1 |
| 5 | Sofia Froes | "Menina alegria" | Firmino Mendes, José Sarmento | José Marinho | 72 | 2 |
| 6 | Célia Oliveira | "Ser o que sou" | Célia Oliveira, António José Guerra | José Marinho | 64 | 3 |
| 7 | Tó Leal | "Sete anos, sete dias" | José Fanha, Eduardo Paes Mamede | Eduardo Paes Mamede | 44 | 6 |
| 8 | Filipa Lourenço | "No cais da solidão" | Carlos Soares, Simon Wadsworth | Simon Wadsworth | 57 | 4 |

Detailed Regional Jury Votes
| R/O | Song | Bragança | Coimbra | Évora | Faro | Funchal | Lisbon | Ponta Delgada | Porto | Viana do Castelo | Vila Real | Viseu | Total |
|---|---|---|---|---|---|---|---|---|---|---|---|---|---|
| 1 | "Uma parte de mim" | 8 | 2 | 5 | 5 | 5 | 1 | 6 | 3 | 2 | 6 | 8 | 51 |
| 2 | "Eu, tu e nós" | 2 | 5 | 2 | 3 | 2 | 3 | 8 | 2 | 3 | 1 | 1 | 32 |
| 3 | "Romanzeira" | 1 | 3 | 1 | 1 | 1 | 2 | 1 | 1 | 4 | 2 | 4 | 21 |
| 4 | "Como tudo começou" | 10 | 6 | 3 | 8 | 10 | 8 | 5 | 10 | 10 | 10 | 10 | 90 |
| 5 | "Menina alegria" | 5 | 10 | 6 | 4 | 4 | 10 | 10 | 8 | 5 | 4 | 6 | 72 |
| 6 | "Ser o que sou" | 4 | 8 | 4 | 6 | 8 | 6 | 4 | 6 | 8 | 8 | 2 | 64 |
| 7 | "Sete anos, sete dias" | 3 | 4 | 10 | 2 | 3 | 4 | 3 | 4 | 1 | 5 | 5 | 44 |
| 8 | "No cais da solidão" | 6 | 1 | 8 | 10 | 6 | 5 | 2 | 5 | 6 | 3 | 3 | 57 |

== At Eurovision ==
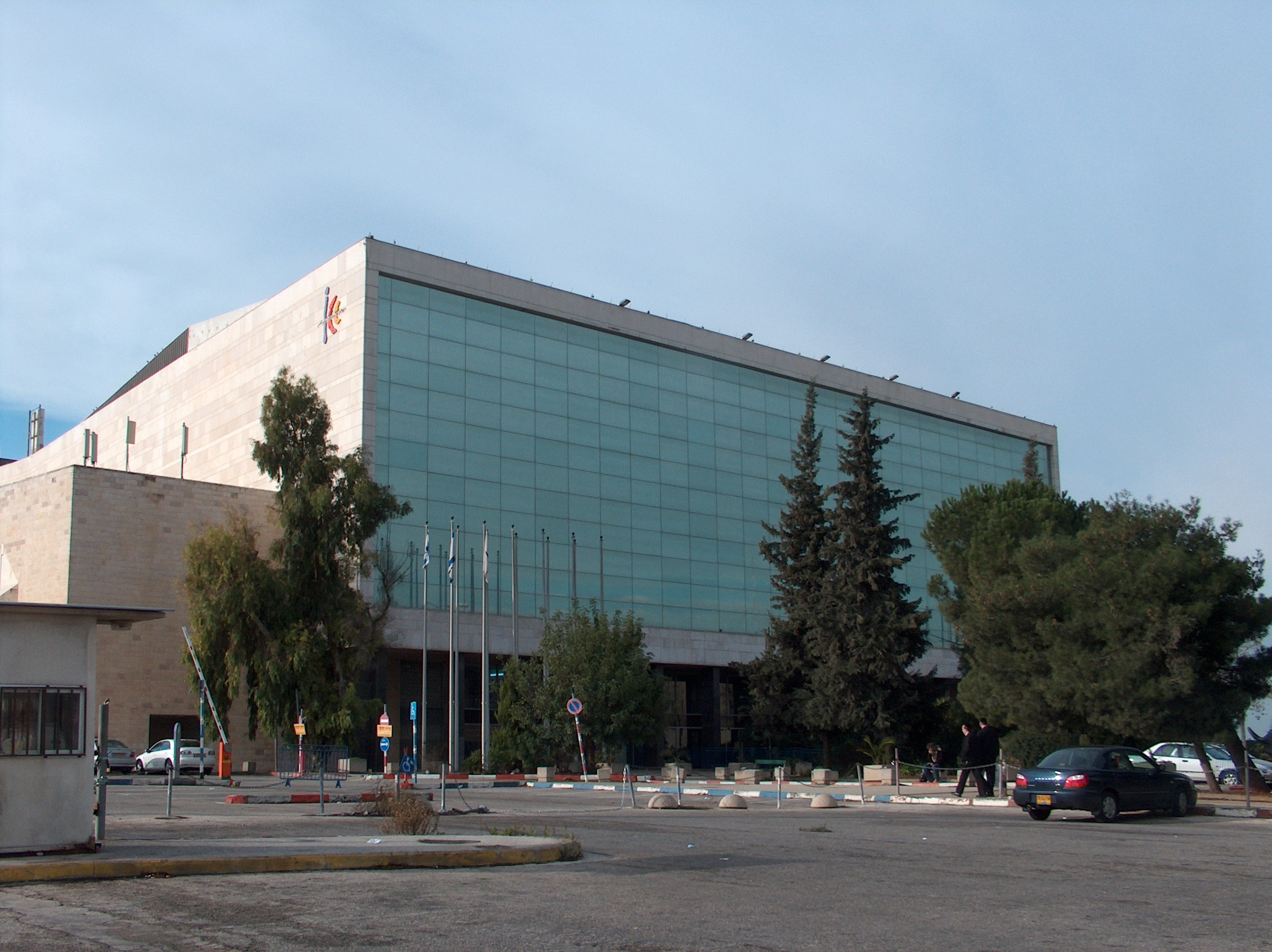
The Eurovision Song Contest 1999 took place at the International Convention Center in Jerusalem, on 29 May 1999.

The Eurovision Song Contest 1999 took place at the International Convention Center in Jerusalem, on 29 May 1999. According to the Eurovision rules, the 23-country participant list for the contest was composed of: the previous year's winning country and host nation, the seventeen countries which had obtained the highest average points total over the preceding five contests, and any eligible countries which did not compete in the 1998 contest. Portugal was originally relegated for being one of the seven lowest scoring countries but was eventually allowed to compete after Hungary withdrew from the contest and the participation of Latvia failed to materialise. On 17 November 1998, an allocation draw was held which determined the running order and Portugal was set to perform in position 16, following the entry from Sweden and before the entry from Ireland. Portugal finished in twenty-first place with 12 points.

RTP broadcast the show on RTP1 and RTP Internacional with commentary by Rui Unas. RTP appointed Manuel Luís Goucha to announce the points awarded by the Portuguese televote. The broadcast of the contest was watched by 19.9% of Portuguese adults, representing a 55.2% market share of those watching television at that time.

=== Voting ===
Below is a breakdown of points awarded to Portugal and awarded by Portugal in the contest. The nation awarded its 12 points to Germany in the contest.

Points awarded to Portugal
| Score | Country |
|---|---|
| 12 points | France |
| 10 points | |
| 8 points | |
| 7 points | |
| 6 points | |
| 5 points | |
| 4 points | |
| 3 points | |
| 2 points | |
| 1 point | |

Points awarded by Portugal
| Score | Country |
|---|---|
| 12 points | Germany |
| 10 points | Sweden |
| 8 points | Israel |
| 7 points | Estonia |
| 6 points | Croatia |
| 5 points | Austria |
| 4 points | Iceland |
| 3 points | Denmark |
| 2 points | Netherlands |
| 1 point | Malta |
