= France in the Eurovision Song Contest 1999 =

- Eurovision Song Contest 1999
- Participating broadcaster: France Télévision
- Country: France
- Selection process: Eurovision 1999: la sélection
- Selection date: 2 March 1999

Competing entry
- Song: "Je veux donner ma voix"
- Artist: Nayah
- Songwriters: Pascal Graczyk; René Colombies; Gilles Arcens; Luigi Rutigliano

Placement
- Final result: 19th, 14 points

Participation chronology

France was represented at the Eurovision Song Contest 1999 with the song "Je veux donner ma voix", written by Pascal Graczyk, René Colombies, Gilles Arcens, and Luigi Rutigliano, and performed by Nayah. The French participating broadcaster, France Télévision, selected its entry for the contest through the national final Eurovision 1999: la sélection organized by France 3.

Twelve songs competed in the national final on 2 March 1999 where "Je veux donner ma voix" performed by Nayah was selected as the winner following the combination of votes from a jury panel and a public vote.

As a member of the "Big Four", France automatically qualified to compete in the Eurovision Song Contest. Performing during the show in position 10, France placed nineteenth out of the 23 participating countries with 14 points.

== Background ==
Prior to the 1999 Contest, France Télévision and its predecessor national broadcasters, had participated in the Eurovision Song Contest representing France forty-one times since RTF's debut in 1956. They first won the contest in 1958 with "Dors, mon amour" performed by André Claveau. In the 1960s, they won three times, with "Tom Pillibi" performed by Jacqueline Boyer in 1960, "Un premier amour" performed by Isabelle Aubret in 1962, and "Un jour, un enfant" performed by Frida Boccara, who won in 1969 in a four-way tie with the Netherlands, Spain, and the United Kingdom. Their fifth – and so far latest – victory came in 1977 with "L'oiseau et l'enfant" performed by Marie Myriam. They have also finished second four times, with "La Belle Amour" by Paule Desjardins in 1957, "Un, deux, trois" by Catherine Ferry in 1976, "White and Black Blues" by Joëlle Ursull in 1990, and "C'est le dernier qui a parlé qui a raison" by Amina in 1991, who lost out to Sweden's "Fångad av en stormvind" by Carola in a tie-break. In 1998, they finished in twenty-fourth place with the song "Où aller" performed by Marie Line.

As part of its duties as participating broadcaster, France Télévision organised the selection of its entry in the Eurovision Song Contest and broadcast the event in the country. For 1999, the broadcaster opted to delegate the selection of its entry to France 3; since 1993, France 2 had been responsible of selecting the entry and broadcasting the contest in France, however, they were unable to broadcast the 1999 contest due to its date conflicting with the French Rugby League Championship. The French broadcaster had used both national finals and internal selection to choose its entry in the past. From 1988 to 1998, the broadcaster opted to internally select its entry. The 1999 French entry was selected via a national final which featured several competing acts, marking the first time since 1987 that a national final was organised to select the French entry.

== Before Eurovision ==
=== Eurovision 1999: la sélection ===
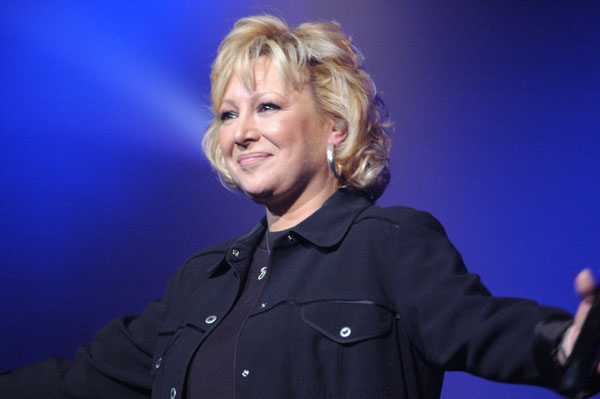
The jury panel of the national final included Marie Myriam who won the 1977 contest for France

France 3 organised the national final Eurovision 1999: la sélection to its entry for the Eurovision Song Contest 1999. The broadcaster received 600 submissions for the competition and a two-member selection committee consisting of Monique Le Marcis (RTL Head of Musical Programming) and Catherine Régnier (M6 music programmer) selected twelve entries to compete in the national final. Songs in Arabic (Israhn), Basque (Kukumiku), Breton (Alex) and Hebrew (Anath) were also featured in addition to French.

Fourteen entries competed in the national final which consisted of a live final that took place on 2 March 1999 at the L'Olympia in Paris, hosted by Julien Lepers and Karen Cheryl and broadcast on France 3. The twelve finalists performed their entries together with an orchestra conducted by Réné Coll and the winner, "Je veux donner ma voix" performed by Nayah, was determined by the combination of public voting via telephone and Minitel (50%) and a ten-member jury panel (50%). The rankings of each half were used to calculate the result; hence, the song with the lowest total won. There was a tie for first place between Ginie Line and Nayah; however, Nayah won as she received the most votes from the public. The national final was watched by 4.996 million viewers in France with a market share of 20.6%.

The jury panel consisted of:

- Gilbert Bécaud (jury president) – singer and composer
- Jean-Michel Boris – artistic director of L'Olympia
- Richard Cocciante – singer-songwriter
- Sandy Valentino – singer
- Jean Réveillon – director of France 3
- Lââm – singer
- Jean-Pierre Bouryayre – composer
- Jocelyne Béroard – singer-songwriter
- Laurent Petitguillaume – presenter
- Marie Myriam – singer, won Eurovision for France in 1977

Eurovision 1999: la sélection – 2 March 1999
R/O	Artist	Song	Jury		Televote		Total	Place
R/O	Artist	Song	Votes	Points	Votes	Points	Total	Place
1	Alex	"Les droits de l'âme"	58	7	4,497	2	9	4
2	Karine Trécy	"Euroland"	44	11	482	11	22	12
3	Caractère	"Douce"	90	2	1,438	7	9	5
4	Nathalie Marine	"C'est souvent ça l'amour"	66	6	1,680	6	12	6
5	Pedro Alves	"Plus jamais, Never More"	89	3	3,725	3	6	3
6	Anath	"Go Ahead"	58	7	1,186	8	15	7
7	Kukumiku	"Irradaka"	48	10	1,084	9	19	10
8	Ginie Line	"La même histoire"	94	1	3,457	4	5	2
9	Mo and La Gazo	"Gazoline"	72	5	378	12	17	9
10	Nayah	"Je veux donner ma voix"	85	4	11,521	1	5	1
11	Israhn	"Ihtidael"	50	9	862	10	19	11
12	Uni.T	"Euro Song"	26	12	2,153	5	17	8

== At Eurovision ==
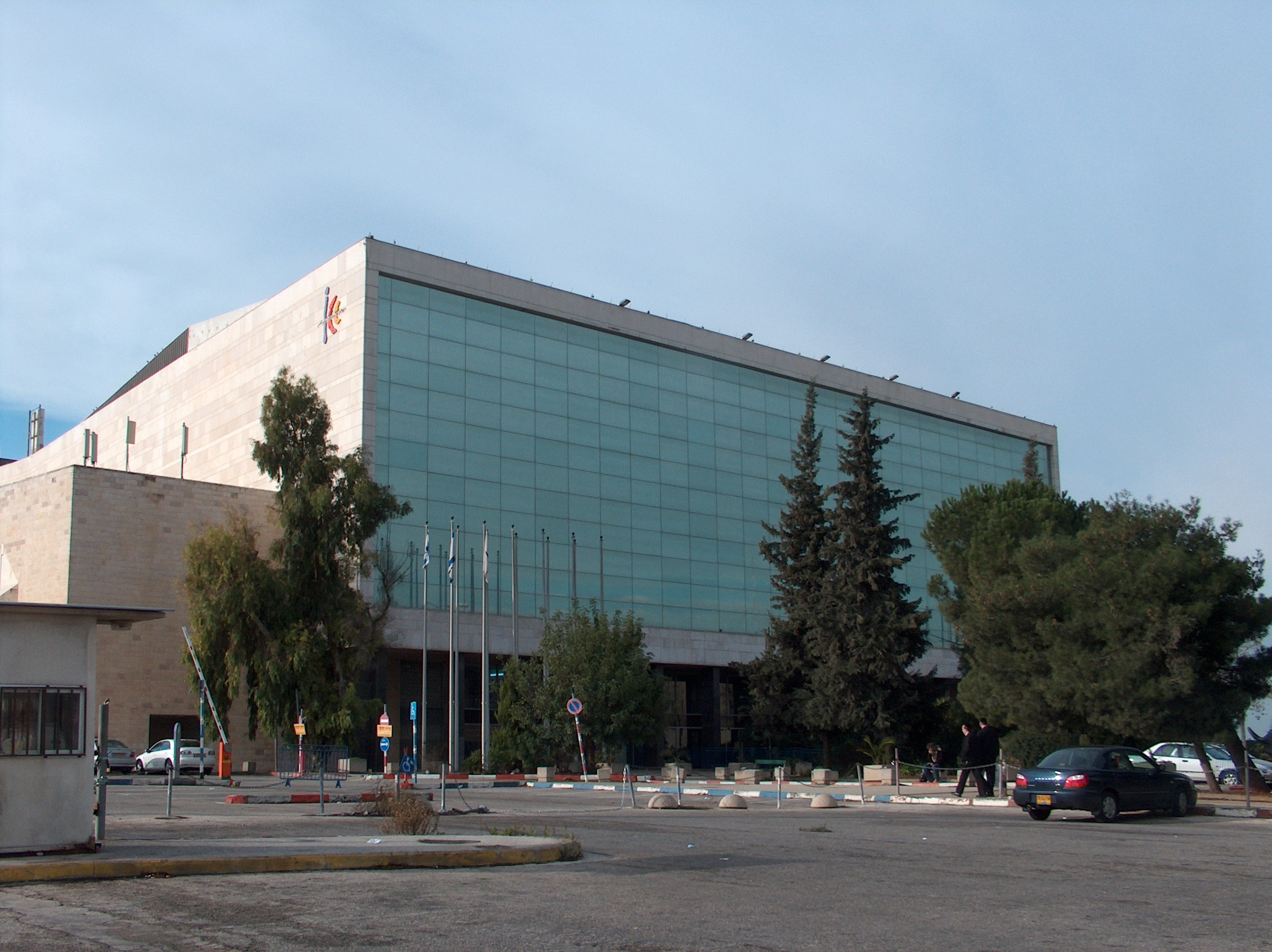
The Eurovision Song Contest 1999 took place at the International Convention Center in Jerusalem, Israel, on 29 May 1999.

The Eurovision Song Contest 1999 took place at the International Convention Center in Jerusalem, Israel, on 29 May 1999. According to the Eurovision rules, the 23-country participant list for the contest was composed of: the previous year's winning country and host nation, the seventeen countries which had obtained the highest average points total over the preceding five contests, and any eligible countries which did not compete in the 1998 contest. As a member of the "Big Four", France automatically qualified to compete in the contest. On 17 November 1998, an allocation draw was held which determined the running order and France was set to perform in position 10, following the entry from Denmark and before the entry from the Netherlands. France finished in nineteenth place with 14 points.

In France, the contest was broadcast on France 3 as well as on a 3 hour and 5 minute delay via TV5 with commentary by Julien Lepers. The French spokesperson, who announced the results of the French televote during the show, was Marie Myriam who won the contest for France in 1977. The France 3 broadcast reached 4.2 million viewers within France, representing a 27.9% market share.

=== Voting ===
Below is a breakdown of points awarded to France and awarded by France in the contest. The nation awarded its 12 points to Portugal in the contest.

Points awarded to France
Score	Country
12 points	
10 points	
8 points	Norway
7 points	
6 points	
5 points	
4 points	
3 points	
2 points	Ireland; Lithuania; Turkey
1 point	

Points awarded by France
Score	Country
12 points	Portugal
10 points	Israel
8 points	Germany
7 points	Croatia
6 points	Bosnia and Herzegovina
5 points	Turkey
4 points	Estonia
3 points	Sweden
2 points	Belgium
1 point	Slovenia
