= Norway in the Eurovision Song Contest 1999 =

- Eurovision Song Contest 1999
- Participating broadcaster: Norsk rikskringkasting (NRK)
- Country: Norway
- Selection process: Melodi Grand Prix 1999
- Selection date: 27 February 1999

Competing entry
- Song: "Living My Life Without You"
- Artist: Van Eijk
- Songwriter: Stig André van Eijk

Placement
- Final result: 14th, 35 points

Participation chronology

Norway was represented at the Eurovision Song Contest 1999 with the song "Living My Life Without You" written and performed by Stig Andre van Eijk under the artistic name Van Eijk. The Norwegian participating broadcaster, Norsk rikskringkasting (NRK), organised the national final Melodi Grand Prix 1999 in order to select its entry for the contest. Eight entries competed in a show that took place on 27 February 1999 and the winner, "Living My Life Without You" performed by Van Eijk, was determined by the votes from a five-member jury panel and a regional televote.

Norway competed in the Eurovision Song Contest which took place on 29 May 1999. Performing during the show in position 8, Norway placed fourteenth out of the 23 participating countries, scoring 35 points.

== Background ==
Prior to the 1999 contest, Norsk rikskringkasting (NRK) had participated in the Eurovision Song Contest representing Norway 38 times since its first entry in 1960. It had won the contest on two occasions: in 1985 with the song "La det swinge" performed by Bobbysocks!, and in 1995 with the song "Nocturne" performed by Secret Garden. It also had the two distinctions of having finished last in the Eurovision final more than any other country and for having the most nul points (zero points) in the contest, the latter being a record the nation shared together with Austria. It had finished last seven times and had failed to score a point during four contests.

As part of its duties as participating broadcaster, NRK organises the selection of its entry in the Eurovision Song Contest and broadcasts the event in the country. The broadcaster has traditionally organised the national final Melodi Grand Prix to select its entry for the contest in all but one of its participation. NRK organized Melodi Grand Prix 1999 in order to select its 1999 entry.

== Before Eurovision ==
=== Melodi Grand Prix 1999 ===
Melodi Grand Prix 1999 was the 38th edition of the national final Melodi Grand Prix, that was organised by NRK to select its entry for the Eurovision Song Contest 1999. The broadcaster held the show on 27 February 1999 at its Studio 2 in Oslo, hosted by Øystein Bache and Rune Gokstad, and was televised on NRK1 as well as broadcast via radio on NRK P1. A live orchestra conducted by Geir Langslet accompanied each performance in varying capacities. The national final was watched by 1.27 million viewers in Norway.

==== Competing entries ====
Composers were directly invited by NRK to compete in the national final. Eight songs were selected for the competition and the competing acts and songs were revealed on 15 January 1999. Among the competing artists was former Eurovision entrant Tor Endresen, who represented Norway in 1997.

Artist	Song	Songwriter(s)
Dag Brandth	"Untold"	Dag Brandth
Ingvild, Dag Arnold and Håvard Gryting	"I'll Be Your Friend"	Håvard Gryting, Anders Moberg, Ingvild Gryting
Mette Hartmann	"The Night Before the Morning After"	Stein Berge Svendsen, Jan Vincents Johannessen
Midnight Sons	"Stay"	Lars Aass, Bottolf Lødemel
Stephen Ackles	"Lost Again"	Kyrre Mosleth, Stephen Ackles
Tor Endresen	"Lover"	Tor Endresen, Kyrre Fritzner, Tore Madsen
Toril Moe	"You Used to Be Mine"	Freddy Dahl, Anita Skorgan
Van Eijk	"Living My Life Without You"	Stig André van Eijk

==== Final ====
Eight songs competed during the final on 27 February 1999. The winner was selected by a combination of votes from regional televoting (5/7) and an expert jury (2/7). The results of the public televote were divided into Norway's five regions and each region distributed points as follows: 1, 2, 3, 5, 7 and 10 points. The jury then distributed points that had a weighting equal to the votes of two televoting regions, leading to the victory of "Living My Life Without You" performed by Van Eijk. The jury panel consisted of Rolf Løvland (composer), Gunilla Holm Platou (TV 2 presenter), Jorun Erdal (singer), Erik Nodland (journalist) and Anders Rogg (musician and composer). In addition to the performances of the competing entries, the interval act featured a tribute to past Israeli Eurovision entries performed by the Norwegian Theatre and Ballet Academy.

Final – 27 February 1999
R/O	Artist	Song	Jury	Public	Total	Place
1	Ingvild, Dag Arnold and Håvard Gryting	"I'll Be Your Friend"	0	14	14	6
2	Mette Hartmann	"The Night Before the Morning After"	14	3	17	5
3	Dag Brandth	"Untold"	6	1	7	8
4	Stephen Ackles	"Lost Again"	10	9	19	4
5	Midnight Sons	"Stay"	4	31	35	2
6	Tor Endresen	"Lover"	2	26	28	3
7	Toril Moe	"You Used to Be Mine"	0	14	14	6
8	Van Eijk	"Living My Life Without You"	20	42	62	1

Detailed Regional Televoting Results
Song	Tromsø	Trondheim	Bergen	Kristiansand	Oslo	Total
"I'll Be Your Friend"	3	1		5	5	14
"The Night Before the Morning After"			1	1	1	3
"Untold"	1					1
"Lost Again"		2	3	2	2	9
"Stay"	5	7	5	7	7	31
"Lover"	10	3	7	3	3	26
"You Used to Be Mine"	7	5	2			14
"Living My Life Without You"	2	10	10	10	10	42

== At Eurovision ==
Norway performed in position 8, following the entry from Turkey and before the entry from Denmark. Norway finished in fourteenth place with 35 points.

In Norway, the show was broadcast on NRK1 with commentary by Jostein Pedersen as well as broadcast via radio on NRK P1 with commentary by Jon Branæs. NRK appointed Ragnhild Sælthun Fjørtoft as its spokesperson to announce the Norwegian votes during the show. The NRK1 broadcast was watched by a total of 1.591 million television viewers.

=== Voting ===
Below is a breakdown of points awarded to Norway and awarded by Norway in the contest. The nation awarded its 12 points to Sweden in the contest.

Points awarded to Norway
Score	Country
12 points	
10 points	
8 points	
7 points	Croatia; Cyprus; Iceland
6 points	Denmark
5 points	Sweden
4 points	
3 points	Ireland
2 points	
1 point	

Points awarded by Norway
Score	Country
12 points	Sweden
10 points	Iceland
8 points	France
7 points	Bosnia and Herzegovina
6 points	Austria
5 points	Estonia
4 points	Turkey
3 points	Germany
2 points	Israel
1 point	Ireland
