= Lithuania in the Eurovision Song Contest 1999 =

- Eurovision Song Contest 1999
- Participating broadcaster: Lithuanian National Radio and Television (LRT)
- Country: Lithuania
- Selection process: "Eurovizijos" dainų konkurso nacionalinė atranka 1999
- Selection date: 31 December 1998

Competing entry
- Song: "Strazdas"
- Artist: Aistė
- Songwriters: Linas Rimša; Sigitas Geda

Placement
- Final result: 20th, 13 points

Participation chronology

Lithuania was represented at the Eurovision Song Contest 1999 with the song "Strazdas", composed by Linas Rimša, with lyrics by Sigitas Geda, and performed by Aistė. The Lithuanian participating broadcaster, Lithuanian National Radio and Television (LRT), selected its entry through the national final entitled "Eurovizijos" dainų konkurso nacionalinė atranka 1999. LRT returned to the contest after a four-year absence following its relegation from the 1995 contest. This was the first-ever entry performed in Samogitian in the contest.

Twelve songs competed in the national final, held on 27 December 1998 and later aired on 31 December, where a jury panel selected the winning song. "Strazdas" performed by Aistė received the most votes and was selected to represent the nation in the contest. Aistė performed as the opening entry for the show in position 1 at Eurovision and at the close of the voting process, finished in 20th place, receiving 13 points.

== Background ==
Prior to the 1999 contest, Lithuanian National Radio and Television (LRT) had participated in the Eurovision Song Contest representing Lithuania only once. Its 1994 debut was with the song "Lopšinė mylimai" performed by Ovidijus Vyšniauskas. It ultimately placed last (25th) at the event. As one of the lowest-scoring entrants that year, Lithuania was relegated and required to miss this 1995 contest.

As part of its duties as participating broadcaster, LRT organises the selection of its entry in the Eurovision Song Contest and broadcasts the event in the country. In 1994, the broadcaster had selected its entry by the internal selection. However, it opted for a national final for the first time to select its 1999 entry.

== Before Eurovision ==
=== "Eurovizijos" dainų konkurso nacionalinė atranka 1999 ===
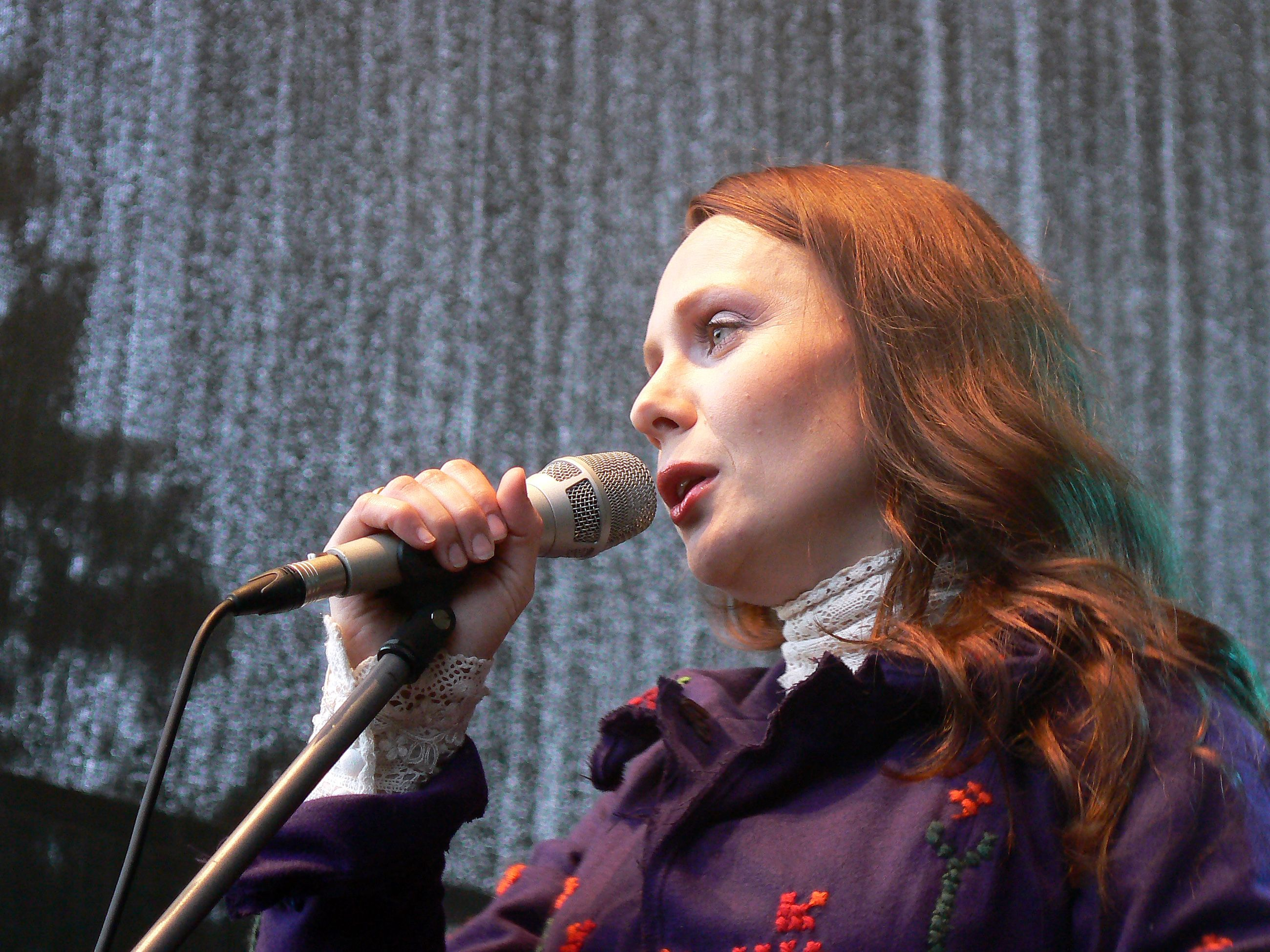
Aistė Smilgevičiūtė (pictured in 2011) was selected to represent Lithuania in the Eurovision Song Contest 1999

"Eurovizijos" dainų konkurso nacionalinė atranka 1999 was the national final format developed by LRT in order to select its entry for the Eurovision Song Contest 1999. The competition, hosted by Vilija Grigonytė and Vytautas Kernagis, was recorded on 27 December 1998 at the LRT studios in Vilnius during the television program Muzikinis viešbutis, and was later aired on 31 December 1998. Both televoting and jury voting was used during the show, however only the votes of the jury decided the winner. The televote results showed that RebelHeart had won with 40%, with Aistė coming second with 33%. The jury selected Aistė with "Strazdas" as the winner, with only the points of the top four songs being announced. "Strazdas" became the first entry in the contest to be performed in the Samogitian dialect.

R/O	Artist	Song	Points	Place
1	Aistė Pilvelytė	"Nubudusi širdis"	—	11
2	B'Avarija	"Nešk mane"	17	4
3	Violeta Riaubiškytė	"Aš dovanoju"	—	6
4	Džeirana Kazlauskaitė	"Viena naktyje"	—	10
5	Aistė Pilvelytė	"Tylos vėrinys"	—	9
6	Otilija	"Mano žvaigždė"	—	8
7	Rūta Ščiogolevaitė	"Vasaros buvo per daug"	—	5
8	Rene	"Sapnas"	—	12
9	Aistė Smilgevičiūtė	"Strazdas"	57	1
10	B'Avarija	"Pamiršk"	—	7
11	Rosita Čivilytė	"Apie tai"	22	3
12	RebelHeart	"Kelias pas tave"	27	2

== At Eurovision ==
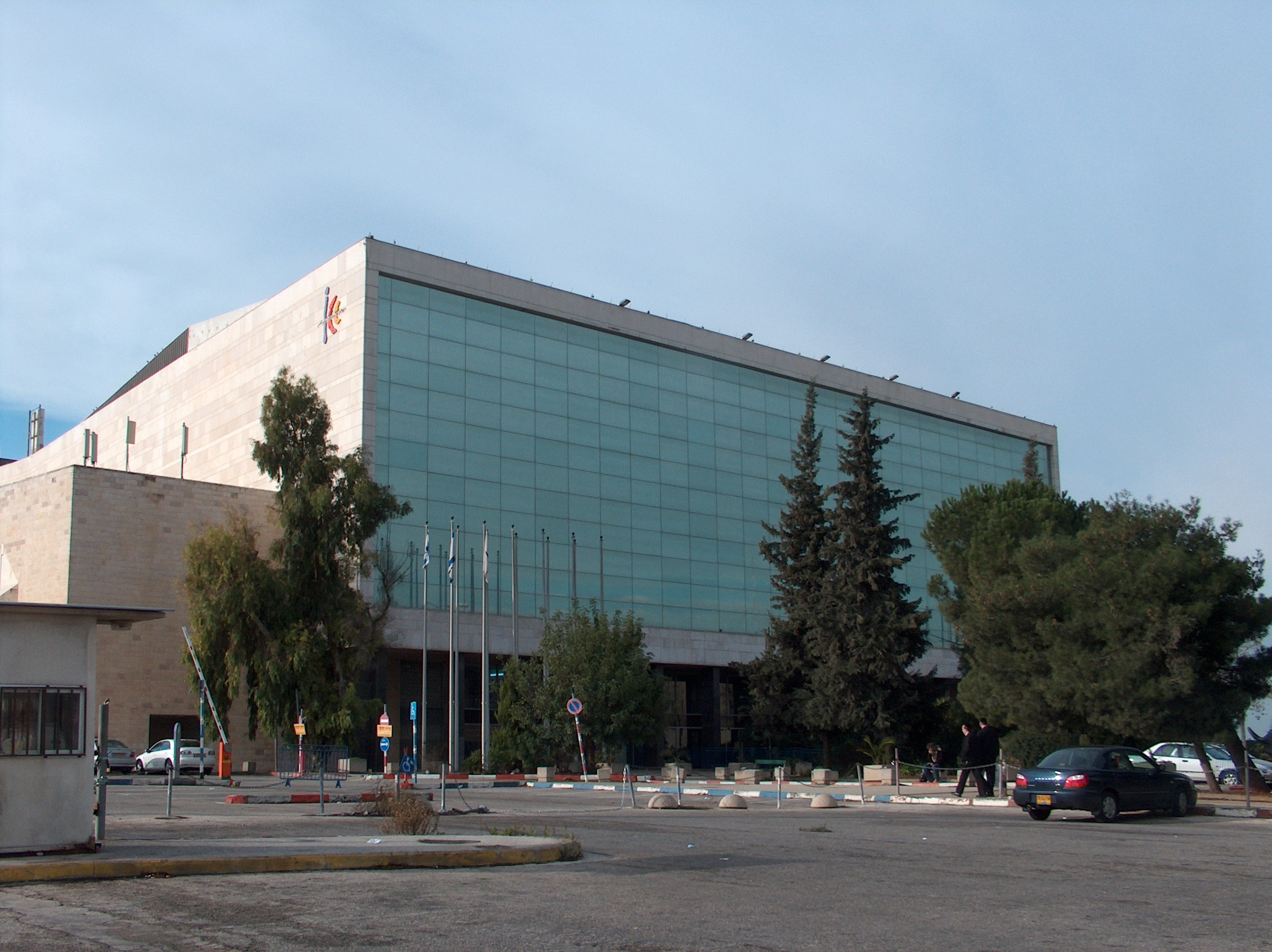
The Eurovision Song Contest 1999 took place at the International Convention Center in Jerusalem, on 29 May 1999.

The Eurovision Song Contest 1999 took place at the International Convention Center in Jerusalem, on 29 May 1999. According to the Eurovision rules, the 23-country participant list for the contest was composed of: the previous year's winning country and host nation, the seventeen countries which had obtained the highest average points total over the preceding five contests, and any eligible countries which did not compete in the 1998 contest. Lithuania was one of the eligible countries which did not compete in the 1998 contest, and thus were permitted to participate. The running order for the contest was decided by a draw held on 17 November 1998; Lithuania was assigned to perform 1st at the 1999 contest, preceding Belgium's "Like the Wind" by Vanessa Chinitor. The contest was broadcast in Lithuania on LRT with the commentary by Darius Užkuraitis.

Lithuania's participation in the contest was financially supported by the Lithuanian Ministry of Finances, which allocated a subsidy of 14,000 litas. Due to the budget concerns, the Lithuanian delegation was permitted to arrive in Israel one day later than the other delegations. Aistė took part in technical rehearsals on 25 and 26 May, followed by dress rehearsals held on 28 and 29 May. The Lithuanian performance featured Aistė on stage performing in a black outfit designed by Juozas Statkevicius. After the voting concluded, Lithuania scored 13 points and placed 20th. At the time, this result was Lithuania's best placing in its competitive history. In regards to the result, Aistė herself stated: "I don't mind [the result] at all. The twentieth or some other place is the least of my worries. These are games that its better not to think about. [...] And what I did at Eurovision, I did the right way. I am calm because of this. I couldn't performed better." Due to a low average score, Lithuania was excluded from the Eurovision Song Contest 2000 held the next year. Lithuania ultimately returned to the contest in 2001.

=== Voting ===
The same voting system in use since 1975 was again implemented for the 1999 contest, with each country providing 1–8, 10 and 12 points to the ten highest-ranking songs as determined by a selected jury or the viewing public through televoting, with countries not allowed to vote for themselves. Lithuania opted to assemble an 8-member jury panel to determine which countries would receive their points. LRT appointed Andrius Tapinas as its Lithuanian spokesperson to announce the points awarded by the Lithuanian jury during the final. Below is a breakdown of points awarded to Lithuania and awarded by Lithuania in the contest.

Points awarded to Lithuania
Score	Country
12 points	
10 points	
8 points	
7 points	
6 points	
5 points	Cyprus
4 points	
3 points	Israel
2 points	Croatia; Estonia
1 point	Malta

Points awarded by Lithuania
Score	Country
12 points	Ireland
10 points	Slovenia
8 points	Iceland
7 points	Poland
6 points	Croatia
5 points	United Kingdom
4 points	Netherlands
3 points	Sweden
2 points	France
1 point	Estonia
