= Poland in the Eurovision Song Contest 1999 =

- Eurovision Song Contest 1999
- Participating broadcaster: Telewizja Polska (TVP)
- Country: Poland
- Selection process: Internal selection
- Announcement date: 9 March 1999

Competing entry
- Song: "Przytul mnie mocno"
- Artist: Mietek Szcześniak
- Songwriters: Seweryn Krajewski; Wojciech Ziembicki

Placement
- Final result: 18th, 17 points

Participation chronology

Poland was represented at the Eurovision Song Contest 1999 with the song "Przytul mnie mocno", composed by Seweryn Krajewski, with lyrics by Wojciech Ziembicki, and performed by Mietek Szcześniak. The Polish participating broadcaster, Telewizja Polska (TVP), internally selected its entry for the contest. The broadcaster announced the entry on 9 March 1999.

Poland competed in the Eurovision Song Contest which took place on 29 May 1999. Performing during the show in position 12, Poland placed eighteenth out of the 23 participating countries, scoring 17 points.

== Background ==
Prior to the 1999 Contest, Telewizja Polska (TVP) had participated in the Eurovision Song Contest representing Poland five times since its first entry in 1994. Its highest placement in the contest, to this point, has been second place, achieved with its debut entry in 1994 with the song "To nie ja!" performed by Edyta Górniak.

As part of its duties as participating broadcaster, TVP organises the selection of its entry in the Eurovision Song Contest and broadcasts the event in the country. Having internally selected their entries since 1994, the broadcaster opted to continue selecting its entry via an internal selection for 1999.

== Before Eurovision ==
=== Internal selection ===
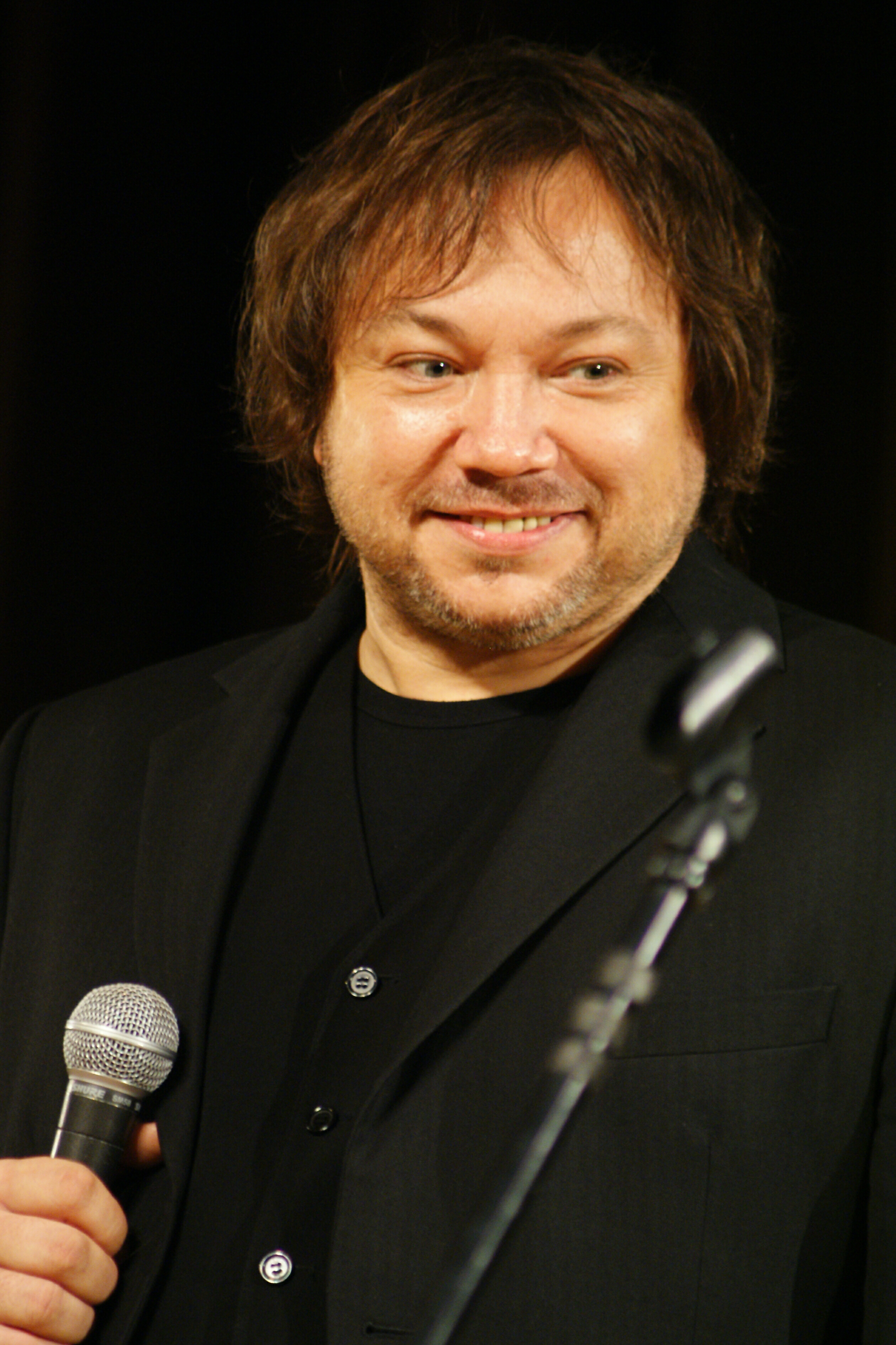
Mietek Szcześniak was internally selected to represent Poland in 1999

TVP selected its entry for the Eurovision Song Contest 1999 via an internal selection. On 9 March 1999, TVP announced that Mietek Szcześniak would represent Poland in the 1999 contest with the song "Przytul mnie mocno", written by Seweryn Krajewski and Wojciech Ziembicki. TVP directly invited four artists to perform "Przytul mnie mocno" during a live audition round held in early 1999: Andrzej Piaseczny, Kasia Stankiewicz, Mietek Szcześniak, and Natalia Kukulska, during which Szcześniak was selected by a selection committee to represent Poland. Among the members of the selection committee were Marek Sierocki (Head of Entertainment of TVP1), Irena Santor (singer and actress) and Wojciech Gąssowski (singer and composer).

== At Eurovision ==
Poland performed in position 12, following the entry from Netherlands and before the entry from Iceland. Poland finished in eighteenth place with 17 points.

The show was broadcast in Poland on TVP1 and TV Polonia with commentary by Artur Orzech.

=== Voting ===
Below is a breakdown of points awarded to Poland and awarded by Poland in the contest. The nation awarded its 12 points to Germany in the contest.

TVP appointed Maciej Orłoś as its spokesperson to announce the Polish votes during the final.

Points awarded to Poland
Score	Country
12 points	
10 points	
8 points	
7 points	Lithuania
6 points	Bosnia and Herzegovina
5 points	
4 points	Germany
3 points	
2 points	
1 point	

Points awarded by Poland
Score	Country
12 points	Germany
10 points	Israel
8 points	Estonia
7 points	Croatia
6 points	Sweden
5 points	Bosnia and Herzegovina
4 points	Iceland
3 points	Austria
2 points	Belgium
1 point	Denmark
