= Krasnoyarsk Time =

Time zone in Russia (UTC+7)

- Time zone

UTC offset
- KRAT: UTC+07:00

Current time
- 10:08, 6 January 2026 KRAT [refresh]

Observance of DST
- DST is not observed in this time zone.

Time in Russia: KALT / Kaliningrad Time / UTC+2 / (MSK−1); MSK / Moscow Time / UTC+3 / (MSK±0); SAMT / Samara Time / UTC+4 / (MSK+1); YEKT / Yekaterinburg Time / UTC+5 / (MSK+2); OMST / Omsk Time / UTC+6 / (MSK+3); KRAT / Krasnoyarsk Time / UTC+7 / (MSK+4); IRKT / Irkutsk Time / UTC+8 / (MSK+5); YAKT / Yakutsk Time / UTC+9 / (MSK+6); VLAT / Vladivostok Time / UTC+10 / (MSK+7); MAGT / Magadan Time / UTC+11 / (MSK+8); PETT / Kamchatka Time / UTC+12 / (MSK+9)

Krasnoyarsk Time (KRAT) is the time zone seven hours ahead of UTC (UTC+07:00) and 4 hours ahead of Moscow Time (MSK+4). KRAT is the official time zone for central and east Siberian regions of Krasnoyarsk Krai, Kemerovo Oblast, Khakassia and Tuva.

Novosibirsk Oblast used this time zone until 1993, when it was known as Novosibirsk Time (NOVT/NOVST). The Russian government renamed the time zone shortly after Novosibirsk opted for another time zone instead.

Between 27 March 2011 and 25 October 2014, Krasnoyarsk Time was fixed at UTC+08:00.

In 2016, the Altai Republic, Altai Krai, Novosibirsk Oblast, and Tomsk Oblast, switched to Krasnoyarsk Time from Omsk Time.

== IANA time zone database ==
In the zone.tab of the IANA time zone database, the zones with the same current offset are:

| c.c. | Coordinates | Timezone name | Comments | UTC offset |
|---|---|---|---|---|
| RU | +5502+08255 | Asia/Novosibirsk | MSK+04 – Novosibirsk | +07:00 |
| RU | +5322+08345 | Asia/Barnaul | MSK+04 – Altai | +07:00 |
| RU | +5630+08458 | Asia/Tomsk | MSK+04 – Tomsk | +07:00 |
| RU | +5345+08707 | Asia/Novokuznetsk | MSK+04 – Kemerovo | +07:00 |
| RU | +5601+09250 | Asia/Krasnoyarsk | MSK+04 – Krasnoyarsk area | +07:00 |
