= Turkey in the Eurovision Song Contest 1999 =

- Eurovision Song Contest 1999
- Participating broadcaster: Turkish Radio and Television Corporation (TRT)
- Country: Turkey
- Selection process: 22. Eurovision Şarkı Yarışması Türkiye Finali
- Selection date: 12 March 1999

Competing entry
- Song: "Dön Artık"
- Artist: Tuba Önal and Grup Mistik
- Songwriters: Erdinç Tunç; Canan Tunç

Placement
- Final result: 16th, 21 points

Participation chronology

Turkey was represented at the Eurovision Song Contest 1999 with the song "Dön Artık", composed by Erdinç Tunç, with lyrics by Canan Tunç, and performed by Tuba Önal and Grup Mistik. The Turkish participating broadcaster, the Turkish Radio and Television Corporation (TRT), selected its entry through a national final.

== Before Eurovision ==
=== 22. Eurovision Şarkı Yarışması Türkiye Finali ===
The Turkish Radio and Television Corporation (TRT) held the national final on 12 March 1999 at its studios in Ankara, hosted by Ömer Önder and Gülşah Banda. Ten songs competed and the winner was determined by an expert jury. Only the top three songs were announced.

Final – 12 March 1999
R/O	Artist	Song	Lyricist	Composer	Place
1	Sedat Yüce	"Bırak Beni"	Savaş Savaşan	Savaş Savaşan	—
2	Tuba Önal & Grup Mistik	"Dön Artık"	Canan Tunç	Erdinç Tunç	1
3	Meltem Büyükuğurgör	"Vazgeçme"	Hakan Süersan	Hakan Süersan	—
4	Volkan Eröz	"Kolay Mı Bırakmak?"	Özgür Yedievli	Özgür Yedievli	—
5	Kaan Yalçın	"Neredesin?"	Emel Atilla	Can Atilla	3
6	Sibel Mirkelam	"Selam Sana Toprak Ana"	Figen Çakmak	Nino Varon	—
7	Birsen Tezer	"Haydi El Ele"	Semra Öztan	Semra Öztan	—
8	Neslihan Demirtaş	"Döne Döne"	Mehmet Kartalkanat	Mehmet Kartalkanat	—
9	Feryal Başel	"Unuttuğumu Sandığım Anda"	İhsan Köseoğlu	İhsan Köseoğlu	2
10	Group M-B	"Her Nefeste"	Günay Çoban	Mertol Şalt	—

== At Eurovision ==
Önal performed his song 7th on the night of the contest, following Slovenia and preceding Norway. At the close of the voting it had received 21 points, placing 16th in a field of 23.

=== Voting ===
Points awarded to Turkey
Score	Country
12 points	Germany
10 points	
8 points	
7 points	
6 points	
5 points	France
4 points	Norway
3 points	
2 points	
1 point	

Points awarded by Turkey
Score	Country
12 points	Germany
10 points	Iceland
8 points	Croatia
7 points	Bosnia and Herzegovina
6 points	Sweden
5 points	Netherlands
4 points	United Kingdom
3 points	Israel
2 points	France
1 point	Ireland
