= Stephen Ackles =

Norwegian musician (1966–2023)

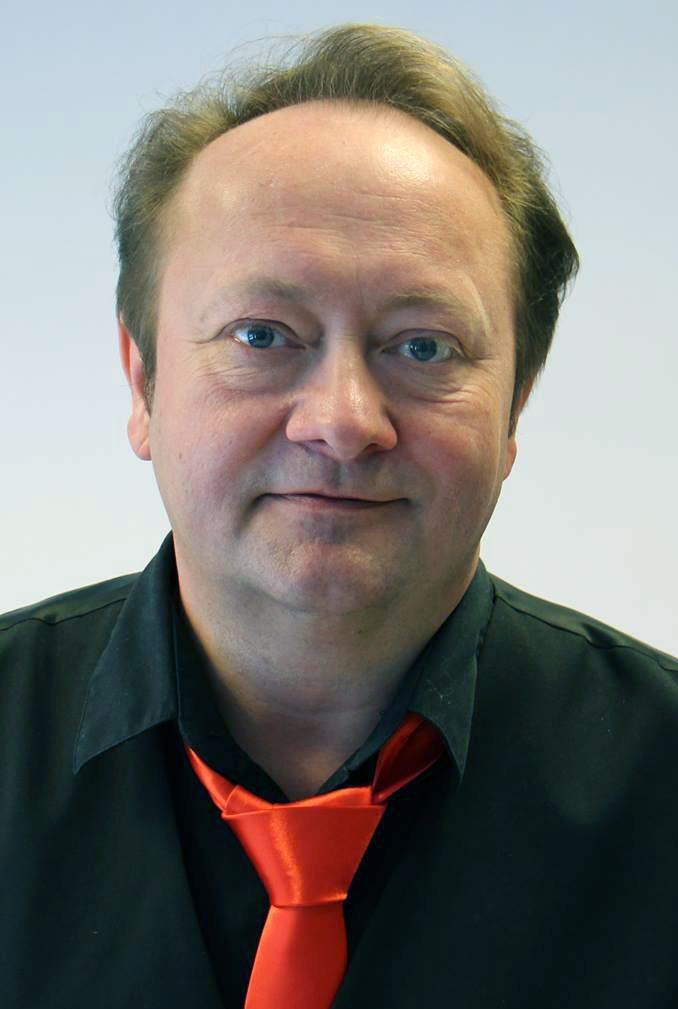

Background information
- Born: 15 February 1966; Brevik, Norway
- Died: 28 September 2023 (aged 57) Langhus, Norway
- Genres: Rock 'n roll
- Occupations: Singer, songwriter, pianist
- Instruments: Song, piano
- Years active: 1980–2023
- Website: http://www.stephenackles.com

Stephen Ackles (15 February 1966 – 28 September 2023) was a Norwegian vocalist, pianist, and songwriter who mainly played rock 'n' roll inspired by Jerry Lee Lewis, Chuck Berry, Little Richard, and Elvis Presley. His mother, Bergliot Kittilsen, was Norwegian, and his father, Allan Dale Ackles was American.

Ackles worked with artists such as Sir Elton John, Carl Perkins, Tom Jones, Johnny Cash, Kris Kristofferson, Little Richard, Waylon Jennings, Jerry Lee Lewis, Linda Gail Lewis, James Burton and Narvel Felts.

Ackles took part in the Norwegian finals of Melodi Grand Prix in 1992, 1996, and 1999.

Stephen Ackles died on 28 September 2023, at the age of 57.

== Discography ==
=== Albums ===
- 1988 – Stephen Ackles and The Memphis News
- 1990 – I Ain't No Different Than You
- 1991 – If This Ain't Music
- 1992 – Hey You!
- 1993 – Rarities Vol. 1
- 1993 – Let's Keep the Night
- 1995 – One for the Moon
- 1996 – Rockin' My Life Away (Live Album)
- 1997 – Hungry for life
- 1999 – The Gospel According to...
- 2002 – I Believe
- 2005 – Stephen Ackles
- 2007 – The Presley Project
- 2013 – For More Than Only Tonight
- 2015 – The Confidence Game

=== Eurovision contributions ===
- 1992 – Det er lørdag og rock'n roll (It's Saturday and rock'n roll)
- 1996 – Jennina (Jennine)
- 1999 – Lost again
