= Croatia in the Eurovision Song Contest 1999 =

- Eurovision Song Contest 1999
- Participating broadcaster: Croatian Radiotelevision (HRT)
- Country: Croatia
- Selection process: Dora '99
- Selection date: 7 March 1999

Competing entry
- Song: "Marija Magdalena"
- Artist: Doris Dragović
- Songwriters: Tonči Huljić; Vjekoslava Huljić

Placement
- Final result: 4th, 118 points

Participation chronology

Croatia was represented at the Eurovision Song Contest 1999 with the song "Marija Magdalena", composed by Tonči Huljić, with lyrics by Vjekoslava Huljić, and performed by Doris Dragović. The Croatian participating broadcaster, Croatian Radiotelevision (HRT), selected its entry for the contest through Dora 1999. Dragović had previously represented Yugoslavia in 1986 placing eleventh with the song "Željo moja".

Twenty-four entries competed in the national final on 7 March 1999 and "Marija Magdalena" performed by Doris Dragović was selected as the winner following the combination of votes from 20 regional juries and a public televote.

Croatia competed in the Eurovision Song Contest which took place on 29 May 1999. Performing during the show in position 4, Croatia placed fourth out of the 23 participating countries, scoring 118 points. This remained the best result until 2024 when Baby Lasagna finished in 2nd place with Rim Tim Tagi Dim, and still remains Croatia's best result with a Croatian-language song.

== Background ==
Prior to the 1999 contest, Croatian Radiotelevision (HRT) had participated in the Eurovision Song Contest representing Croatia six times since its first entry in 1993. Its best result in the contest was fourth, which it achieved in 1996 with the song "Sveta ljubav" performed by Maja Blagdan. In 1998, it placed fifth with Danijela and the song "Neka mi ne svane".

As part of its duties as participating broadcaster, HRT organises the selection of its entry in the Eurovision Song Contest and broadcasts the event in the country. Between 1993 and 1998, HRT organised the national final Dora in order to select its entry for the contest, a method that continued for its 1999 participation.

== Before Eurovision ==
=== Dora '99 ===
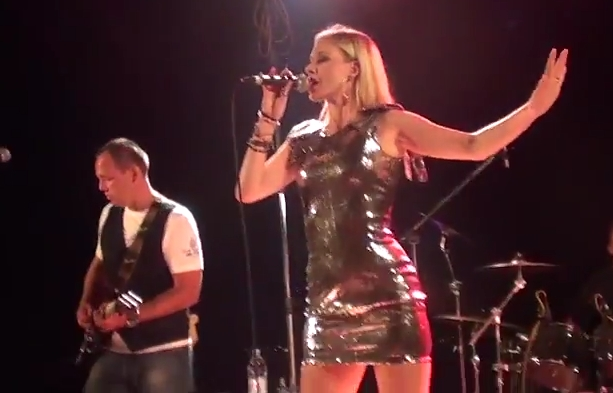
Jelena Rozga (pictured in 2011), lead singer of the group Magazin which represented Croatia in 1995, and which entered Dora '99

Dora '99 was the seventh edition of the national selection Dora which selected the Croatian entry for the Eurovision Song Contest 1999. The competition consisted of twenty-four entries, selected by an expert committee following a submission period opened by HRT between 14 November and 22 December 1998, competing in one final on 7 March 1999 at Jadran Film's Studio 2 in Zagreb, hosted by Oliver Mlakar and Vlatka Pokos and broadcast on HTV1. HRT broadcast an additional two shows prior to the final; the first show on 5 March, titled Naj Dora, featured performances from former Croatian Eurovision entrants, while the second show on 6 March, titled Pjevajmo Doru, featured the twenty-four competing artists performing songs from previous editions of Dora of their choice. Among the artists were Doris Dragović who represented Yugoslavia in 1986, and Magazin which represented Croatia in 1995.

For the first time since Dora existed, an orchestra was introduced to accompany the entries. Nineteen of the twenty-four competing songs were performed with HRT's Revijski Orchestra during the final and the winner, "Marija Magdalena" performed by Doris Dragović, was determined by a combination of votes from 20 regional juries and a public televote, the latter of which had the same weight as one jury. In addition to the performances of the competing entries, Tihana Škrinjarić, members of the Turbo Limach Show and Danijela, who represented Croatia in 1998, performed as the interval acts during the show.

Final – 7 March 1999
R/O	Artist	Song	Songwriter(s)	Conductor	Points	Place
1	Teens	"Miris ljubavi"	Mario Šimunović, Andrej Babić	Silvije Glojnarić	28	14
2	Kristina	"Da zora zna"	Nenad Ninčević, Ivo Lesić	Stipica Kalogjera	0	21
3	Alen Nižetić	"Samo ti"	Nenad Ninčević	Stipica Kalogjera	23	16
4	Andy	"Samo nebo zna"	Damir Farkaš	Stipica Kalogjera	49	9
5	En Face	"Kad prestane kiša"	Sandro Bastijančić, Miroslav Vidović	n/a	0	21
6	Giuliano	"Dobro mi došla ljubavi"	Nenad Ninčević, Tomiaslav Mrduljas	Nikica Kalogjera	87	6
7	Josip Katalenić	"San"	Jasminka Toth, Miroslav Borščak	Alan Bjelinski	106	4
8	Nikita	"Kraljica noći"	Ivica Krajač, Random Brojek	Silvije Glojnarić	5	19
9	Magazin	"Kasno je"	Tonči Huljić, Vjekoslava Huljić	Stipica Kalogjera	105	5
10	Sanja Lukanović	"Još jednom"	Robert Pilepić, Aleksandar Valenčić	n/a	8	18
11	Turbo X	"Cijeli svijet je između nas"	Dario Stipić, Fayo	Josip Cvitanović	0	21
12	Goran Karan	"Nisam te vrijedan"	Nenad Ninčević, Zdenko Runjić	Stipica Kalogjera	122	3
13	Joy	"Uzalud"	Fayo, Branimir Mihaljević	n/a	11	17
14	Mandi	"Lako je reći zbogom"	Branko Bernardić, Krešimir Bernardić, Miro Buljan	n/a	2	20
15	Marina Tomašević	"Ja sam tvoja žena"	Marko Tomasović	Nikica Kalogjera	28	14
16	Đani Stipaničev	"Još jedno jutro budi se"	Sanja Mudrinić, Ðani Stipaničev	Alan Bjelinski	38	12
17	Branka Bliznac	"Dajte ljubavi"	Nenad Ninčević, Rajko Dujmić	Nikica Kalogjera	0	21
18	Zrinka	"Jednom u životu"	Zendko Runjić, Tonči Huljić	Stipica Kalogjera	55	8
19	Zorana Šiljeg	"Nije te briga"	Zorana Šiljeg	Nikica Kalogjera	38	12
20	Renata Sabljak	"I kako sada ići dalje"	Marin Bukmir, Željen Klašterka	Alan Bjelinski	39	11
21	Doris Dragović	"Marija Magdalena"	Tonči Huljić, Vjekoslava Huljić	Stipica Kalogjera	207	1
22	Mladen Grdović	"Mama Marija"	Nenad Ninčević, Mladen Grdović	Stipica Kalogjera	74	7
23	Minea	"U ponoć pozvoni"	Tonči Huljić, Vjekoslava Huljić	n/a	40	10
24	Petar Grašo	"Ljubav jedne žene"	Petar Grašo	Stipica Kalogjera	153	2

Detailed Voting Results
R/O	Song	Bjelovar	Čakovec	Dubrovnik	Gospić	Karlovac	Koprivnica	Krapina	Osijek	Pazin	Požega	Rijeka	Sisak	Slavonski Brod	Split	Šibenik	Varaždin	Virovitica	Vukovar	Zadar	Zagreb	Televote	Total
1	"Miris ljubavi"										5	6	4	3						2	3	5	28
2	"Da zora zna"																						0
3	"Samo ti"			3		2								1	2	5			2			8	23
4	"Samo nebo zna"				3	4		2	7	1	8	7		7		1	5	3	1				49
5	"Kad prestane kiša"																						0
6	"Dobro mi došla ljubavi"	2	5	6	5			6	1	5	2	1		10	7	8	1	4	4		10	10	87
7	"San"	7	12	2		5	10	7	8		1	3	10		6		10			12	7	6	106
8	"Kraljica noći"											5											5
9	"Kasno je"	8	7		8	7	12	8	4	7	6			8	4	3	8	5	7		2	1	105
10	"Još jednom"						3			3		2											8
11	"Cijeli svijet je između nas"																						0
12	"Nisam te vrijedan"	6	2	4	4	8	4	10		12	7	12			12	10		12	5	7	5	2	122
13	"Uzalud"		3										7							1			11
14	"Lako je reći zbogom"															2							2
15	"Ja sam tvoja žena"	3					2	1	2				2	4						8	6		28
16	"Još jedno jutro budi se"			1		1	6			6			5		5	7	2			5			38
17	"Dajte ljubavi"																						0
18	"Jednom u životu"	1	8	5	6	3		4				4	1		3		7	6	6		1		55
19	"Nije te briga"	4		10	10			5	5											4			38
20	"I kako sada ići dalje"	5			1		1			4	3		6	5		4		2			8		39
21	"'Marija Magdalena"	12	10	12	12	12	7	12	10	8	12	10	8	12	8	6	12	10	12	6	4	12	207
22	"Mama Marija"		6	8	7	10		3	6						1		3	7	10	10		3	74
23	"U ponoć pozvoni"		4		2		5		3	2	4		3	2			4	1	3	3		4	40
24	"Ljubav jedne žene"	10	1	7		6	8		12	10	10	8	12	6	10	12	6	8	8		12	7	153

== At Eurovision ==
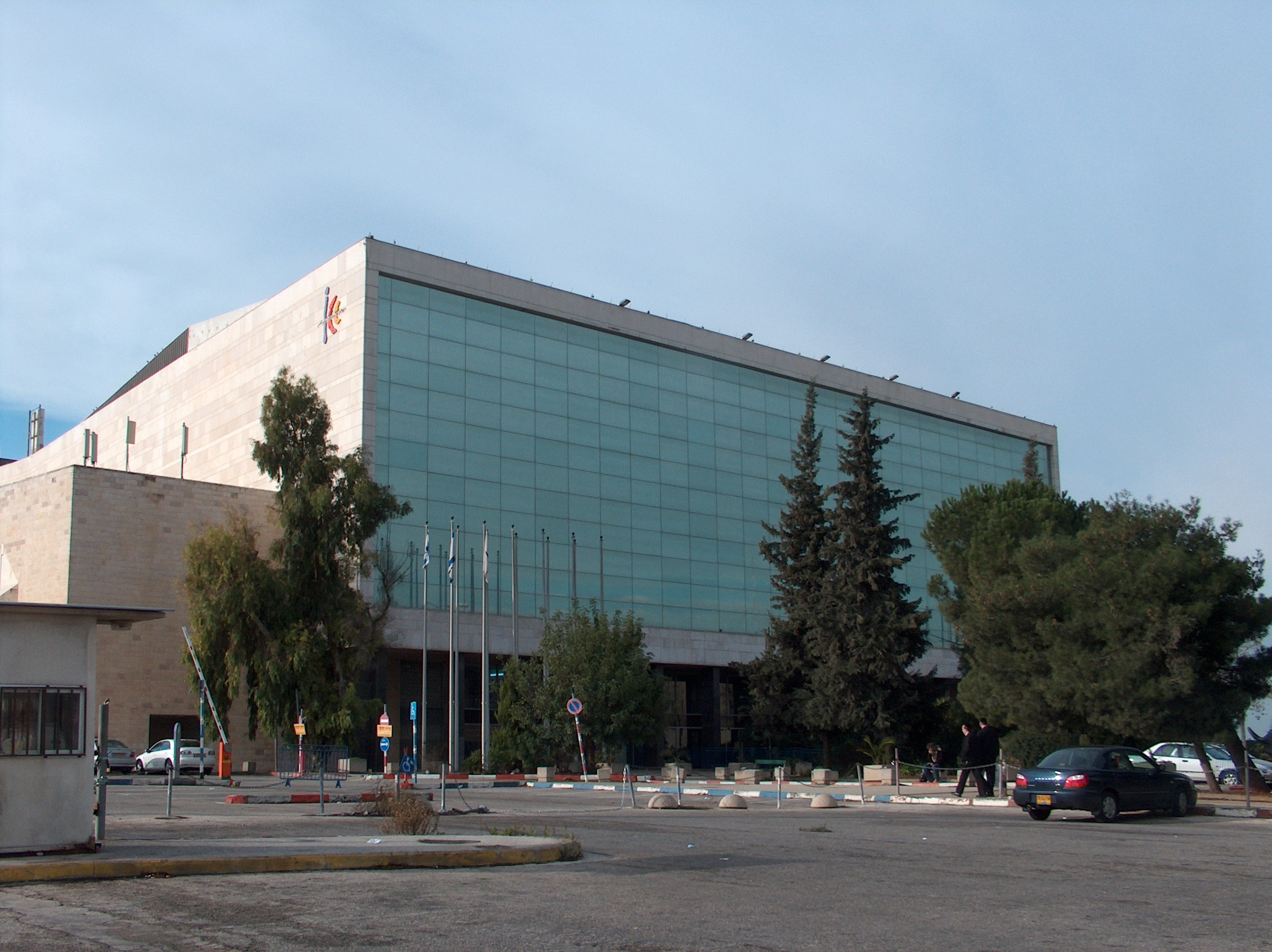
The Eurovision Song Contest 1999 took place at the International Convention Center in Jerusalem, on 29 May 1999.

The Eurovision Song Contest 1999 took place at the International Convention Center in Jerusalem, on 29 May 1999. According to the Eurovision rules, the 23-country participant list for the contest was composed of: the previous year's winning country and host nation, the seventeen countries which had obtained the highest average points total over the preceding five contests, and any eligible countries which did not compete in the 1998 contest. On 17 November 1998, an allocation draw was held which determined the running order and Croatia was set to perform in position 4, following the entry from Spain and before the entry from the United Kingdom. Croatia finished in fourth place with 118 points, which was their joint-best placing at the contest at that time alongside 1996. This record was taken in 2024 when the nation placed second with Baby Lasagna and "Rim Tim Tagi Dim".

The contest was broadcast in Croatia on HTV1 with commentary by Aleksandar Kostadinov. HRT appointed Marko Rašica as its spokesperson to announce the results of the Croatian televote during the final.

=== Voting ===
Below is a breakdown of points awarded to and by Croatia in the contest. The nation awarded its 12 points to Slovenia in the contest.

Points awarded to Croatia
Score	Country
12 points	Slovenia; Spain
10 points	Germany
8 points	Austria; Bosnia and Herzegovina; Turkey
7 points	France; Israel; Poland
6 points	Ireland; Lithuania; Portugal
5 points	Belgium; Malta
4 points	Iceland
3 points	Estonia
2 points	Cyprus
1 point	Netherlands; Sweden

Points awarded by Croatia
Score	Country
12 points	Slovenia
10 points	Bosnia and Herzegovina
8 points	Israel
7 points	Norway
6 points	Malta
5 points	United Kingdom
4 points	Belgium
3 points	Germany
2 points	Lithuania
1 point	Spain

== After Eurovision ==
The Norwegian delegation raised an objection to the use of simulated male vocals during the performance of Croatian entry "Marija Magdalena". Following the contest this was found to have contravened the contest rules regarding the use of vocals on the backing tracks, and Croatia were sanctioned by the EBU with the loss of 33% of their points for the purpose of calculating their average points total for qualification in following contests. The country's position and points at this contest however remain unchanged.
