= Novosibirsk Time =

Time in Russia: KALT / Kaliningrad Time / UTC+2 / (MSK−1); MSK / Moscow Time / UTC+3 / (MSK±0); SAMT / Samara Time / UTC+4 / (MSK+1); YEKT / Yekaterinburg Time / UTC+5 / (MSK+2); OMST / Omsk Time / UTC+6 / (MSK+3); KRAT / Krasnoyarsk Time / UTC+7 / (MSK+4); IRKT / Irkutsk Time / UTC+8 / (MSK+5); YAKT / Yakutsk Time / UTC+9 / (MSK+6); VLAT / Vladivostok Time / UTC+10 / (MSK+7); MAGT / Magadan Time / UTC+11 / (MSK+8); PETT / Kamchatka Time / UTC+12 / (MSK+9)

Novosibirsk Time was historically MSK+4. When Novosibirsk Oblast including the city of Novosibirsk changed to MSK+3, the MSK+4 time started to be called Krasnoyarsk Time.

The MSK+3 time was known as Omsk Time before the change and still is so.

In 2016, according to the Federal Law ФЗ-216 signed by president Putin on July 3, 2016 the Novosibirsk Time returns to MSK+4. The law takes effect July 24, 2016 at 2:00. The clock will need to be set an hour ahead - that is, 3 o'clock in the morning.

== See also ==
- Time in Russia
