= Prophet Jeremiah (Michelangelo) =

Fresco on the Sistine Chapel ceiling

The Prophet Jeremiah
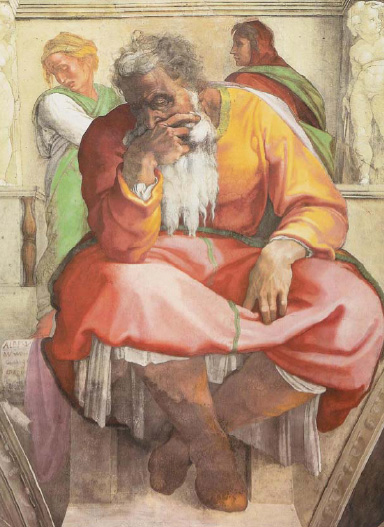
- Artist: Michelangelo
- Year: circa 1508–1512
- Type: Fresco
- Dimensions: 390 cm × 380 cm (150 in × 150 in)
- Location: Sistine Chapel, Vatican Palace; Vatican City

The Prophet Jeremiah is one of the seven Old Testament prophets painted by the Italian High Renaissance master Michelangelo (c. 1510–12) on the Sistine Chapel ceiling. The Sistine Chapel is in Vatican Palace, in the Vatican City.

This particular fresco is the first one on the left from the side of the High Altar. The person of Jeremiah is imagined as lost in anguished meditation. Although the painting portrays Jeremiah as lamenting over the Destruction of Jerusalem, critics have interpreted the figure as a self-portrait by Michelangelo, with the artist lamenting over the weight of his sins. Or perhaps Michelangelo is bemoaning his situation being forced by Julius II to paint when he wished to sculpt. Michelangelo spent 4 years on the Sistine ceiling during which time he escaped Rome and the job a few times when he fled to his hometown, Florence. Note that Raphael added the figure of Michelangelo/Heraclitus to his own fresco of the School of Athens and Raphael "copied" Michelangelo's own self-portrait and gave Michelangelo/Heraclitus boots (Michelangelo was known to have worn boots and didn't often remove them) and the bowed head on hand that Michelangelo had given himself.

Influential English critic Roger Fry used the figure to illustrate his emotional elements of design, or how formal elements such as mass and space produce emotion:

When, for instance, we look at Michelangelo's "Jeremiah," and realise the irresistible momentum his movements would have, we experience powerful sentiments of reverence and awe.

== See also ==
- List of works by Michelangelo

== See also ==
- Sistine Chapel ceiling
