= Nayah =

French singer (born 1960)

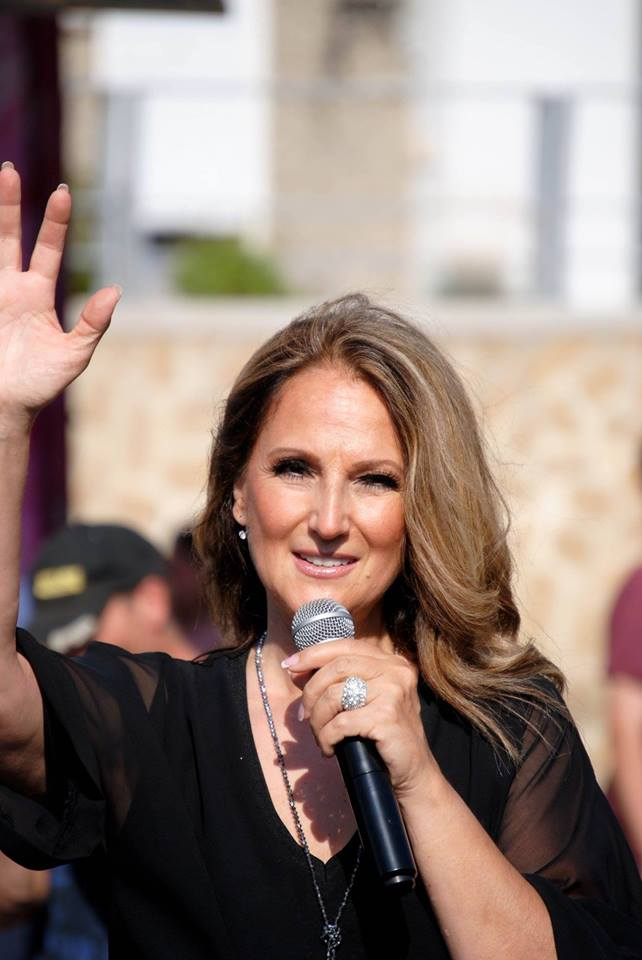
- Nayah in 2018

Background information
- Birth name: Sylvie Mestres
- Born: September 29, 1960 (age 64); Perpignan
- Occupation: Singer

Sylvie Mestres, also known as Nayah, is a French singer.

== Career ==
Nayah launched her music career after six years of studies at the Perpignan Academy of Music and Drama. She was chosen to represent France during the Eurovision Song Contest of 1999 which was held in Jerusalem. Before going to Eurovision, attention was given to her in the French press when they revealed her relationship with the International Raëlian Movement (I.R.M.). Nayah entered the I.R.M. following her husband, and she had climbed the Guide levels until she became an assistant guide (Level 3). This happened after she released a first CD in 1988 titled Elohim which presents themes of the Raëlian Philosophy.

Although the singer confirmed that she had left the I.R.M. since 1996, Nayah followed a mobilization of anti-I.R.M associations, fearing that a victory offers a platform that is a little too visible with the International Raëlian Movement. She was not however prohibited from taking part in the contest, where she ranked 19 out of 23.

Nayah has since returned to the I.R.M. Nayah's return was quoted by the I.R.M. several times to point out the ostracism she had been facing and continued to face. In attempt to reverse this situation, an electronic book called Proud to be Raëlian was published in 2005. A source alleges that Nayah confirmed that she had quit the International Raëlian Movement for good. This source was completely fabricated by the producer and his agent to occult the adherence of Nayah to the International Raëlian Movement. Nayah made a testimony on the subject which is printed on page 145-146 of the book Proud to be Raëlian:

"In the beginning, when these damages started, my producer George Mary and my agent, Jacques Marouani, suggested I declare to the press that I was not active any more in International Raëlian Movement, to devote myself to my career, and to calm matters. It was a terrible decision which I was unwilling to take. Some articles in the press showed the declarations which I had learned by heart. But the whole of the press refused to believe in it. And it is easy to imagine for an industry which nourishes controversy and sensationalism." – Nayah

== Achievements ==
- 1990: Finalist in Swiss Eurovision
- 1996: "Gold Wandering entertainers"
- 1997: Gaining 1st Open Show in New Casting in Geneva
- 1997: 1st prize with St-Aubin Contest in Switzerland
- 1997: Challenge Eddie Barclay
- 1998: Finalist of the Rose d' Or with Antibes (France)
- 1999: Participation in Eurovision.

== Discography ==
- 1988: Elohim
- 1999: MINOR ROAD 2 titles. I want to give my voice took 19th place in the Eurovision contest)

== Quote ==
"I do nothing but pass while hoping to leave on my passage some drops of humanity." – Nayah

== Footnotes ==
Preceded by Marie Line with Où aller	France in the Eurovision Song Contest; 1999	Succeeded by Sofia Mestari with On aura le ciel
