= Stig van Eijk =

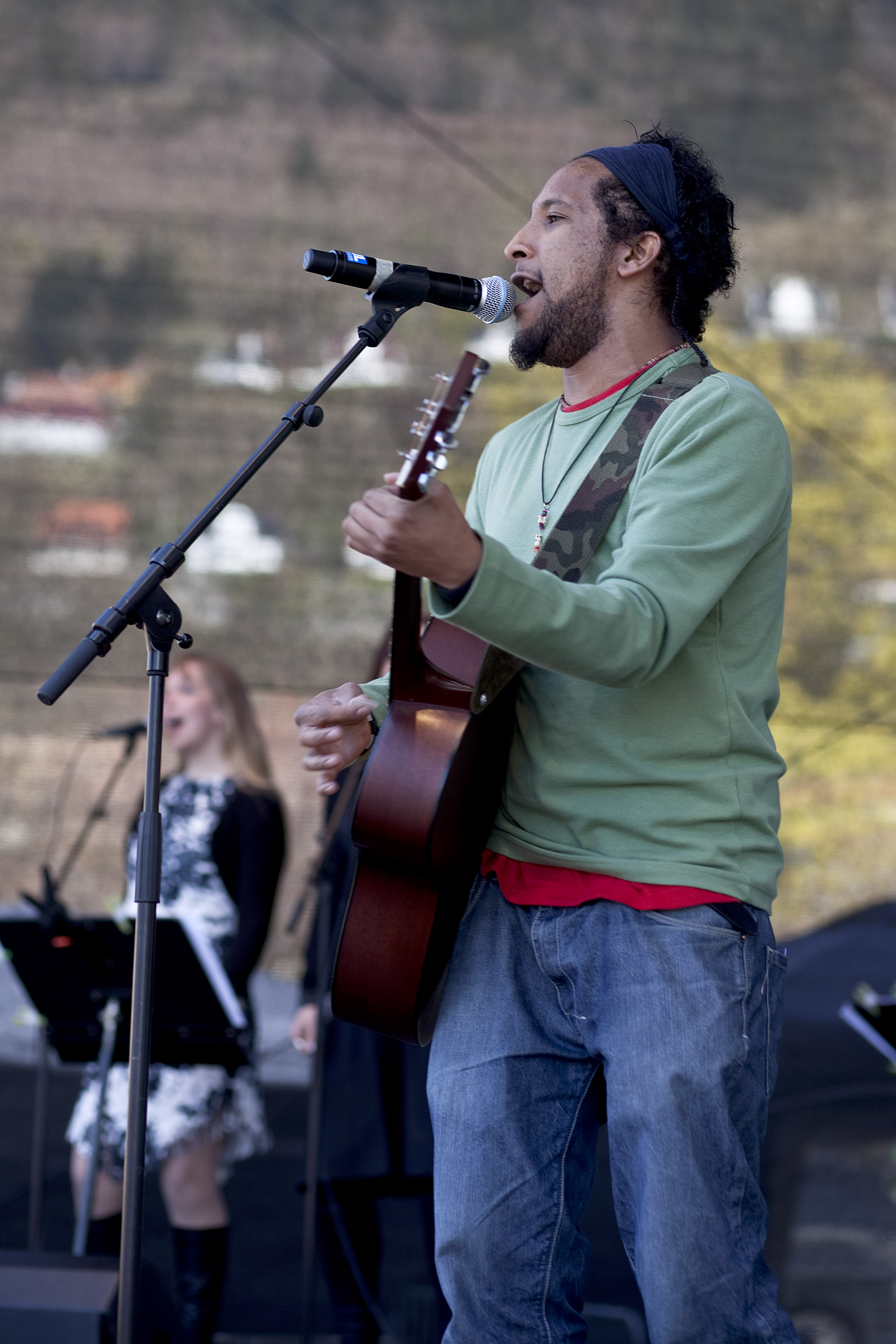
- Van Eijk in 2010

Background information
- Born: Stig André van Eijk; 21 March 1981 (age 45); Cali, Colombia
- Origin: Bergen, Norway
- Genres: Reggae
- Occupations: Singer; songwriter
- Website: www.stigvaneijk.no

Stig André van Eijk (Norwegian: [ˈstiː vɑn ˈæɪk]; born 21 March 1981) is a Colombian-born Norwegian singer and songwriter.

== Career ==
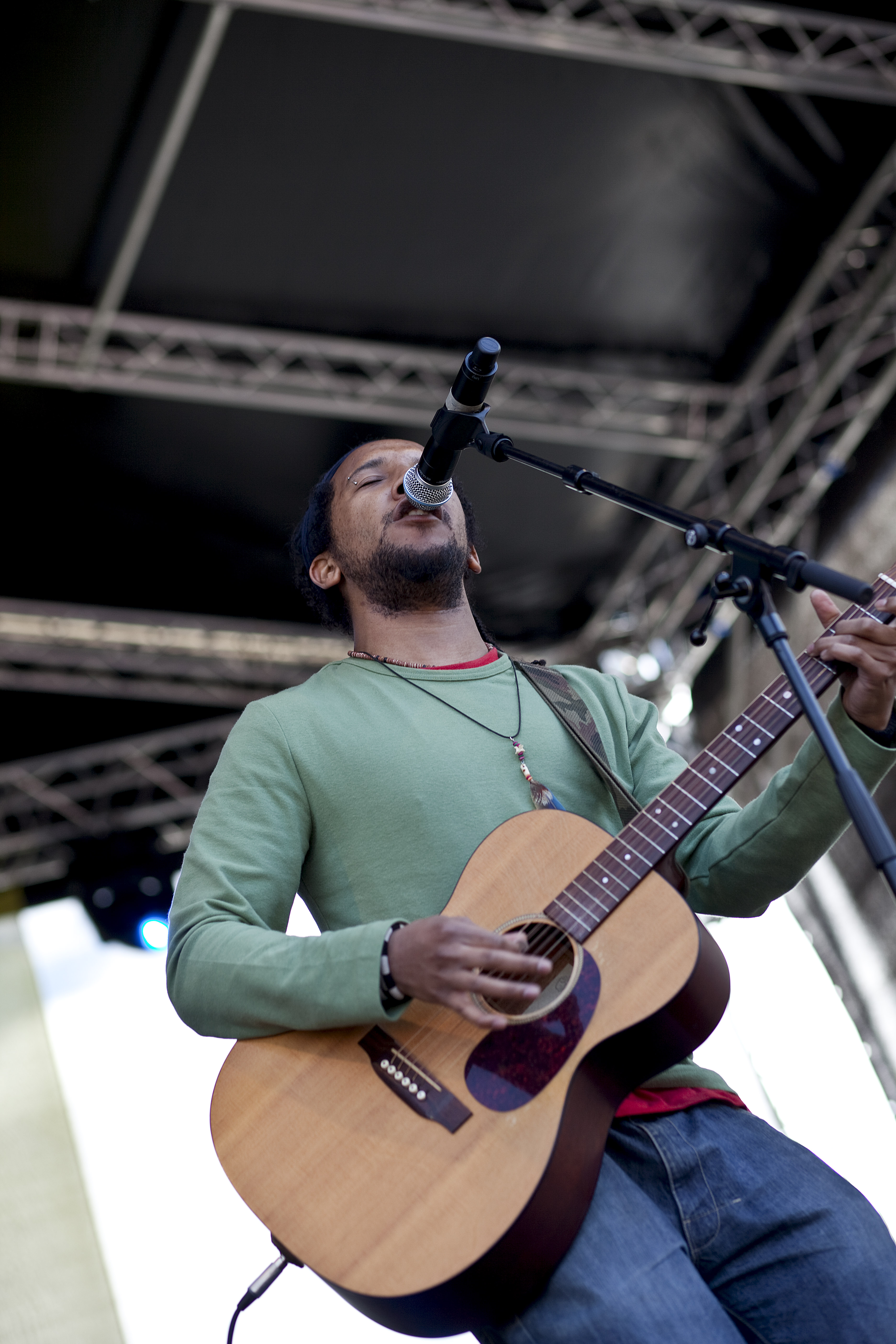
Van Eijk in 2010

Van Eijk is known for his Eurovision participation. In 1999 he won Melodi Grand Prix with the song "Living My Life Without You" thus gaining right to represent Norway at Eurovision that year. On stage he had dancer and singer Belinda Braza. At the Eurovision itself, which was held in Israel, he ended in 14th place, gaining 35 points. He is the first ever black man to represent Norway.

The album, Where I Belong, which was released the same year, went platinum (over 30,000 copies) and reached number 6 on the VG-list Top 40 in Norway. In 2000, he was named this year's male artist (Hit awards). In 2001, Stig also made a peace song for his mother country, Colombia. The song, "Constructors of Peace", was recorded with the symphony orchestra of Bogota, and he went there, performing the song on different concerts and television shows.

In 2001 Van Eijk opened «B: Underground Club» in Bergen. This club was a live concept with a house band playing reggae, soul and funk. In 2003, he made the song "Once In a Lifetime" that won "Idol" in South Africa, performed by Heinz Winckler. The song was a hit in South Africa and became double platinum (100,000 copies).

Stig van Eijk was a long time known as front figure in the reggae band "The Soul Express Orchestra". They released their debut album Time For A Change produced by Isak Strand at Knott Records in 2010. For the last couple of years he has also been working with music in a kindergarten, schools and other culturestages in Norway.

In 2013, Stig released his album "Presentation". The album's content reflects all of his influences from different genres experienced through his career, but with the main foundation of reggae and soul.

In 2015, Stig and his girlfriend, Beate Helen Thunes, released a new childrenproject called Trollala. Trollala has released music and had various performances around in Norway. Christmas performance "Trollala and Christmas that disappeared" have been played two years in Bergen.

He participated again in the Melodi Grand Prix 2023 with the song "Someday", but failed to qualify for the final.

== Discography ==
=== Albums ===
List of studio albums, with selected details
Title	Details	Peak chart positions
Title	Details	NOR
Where I Belong	Released: 18 May 1999; Label: Mercury Records; Formats: Physical, digital download, streaming	6
Presentation	Released: 24 May 2013; Label: Nordic Records; Formats: Digital download, streaming	—
"—" denotes an album that did not chart or was not released in that territory.

=== Singles ===
==== As lead artist ====
Single	Year	Peak chart positions	Album or EP
Single	Year	NOR	Album or EP
"Living My Life Without You"	1999	3	Where I Belong
"Breakout"	1999	—	Where I Belong
"Growing Pains"	2002	—	Non-album singles
"Once in a Lifetime"	2002	—	Non-album singles
"Constructors of Peace"	2007	—	Non-album singles
"Let's Make A Change" (with Betty Tuna)	2011	—	Non-album singles
"Never Say Never"	2012	—	Presentation
"Always a Solution"	2013	—	Presentation
"Down to Earth" (featuring Haisam)	2013	—	Non-album singles
"Ordinary Day"	2014	—	Non-album singles
"Vinteren er kommet" (in Trollala)	2017	—	Non-album singles
"Faith in Us"	2018	—	Non-album singles
"Ser på"	2019	—	Non-album singles
"My Love"	2021	—	Non-album singles
"Bare la det gå"	2022	—	Non-album singles
"Someday"	2023	—	Non-album singles
"—" denotes a recording that did not chart or was not released in that territory.

==== As featured artist ====
Single	Year	Album or EP
"So Beautiful" (Cesca featuring Stig van Eijk)	2009	Give Me A Break
"En god dag" (Akeron featuring Stig van Eijk)	2010	Non-album singles
"Live for Today" (Kingsley Anowi featuring Stig van Eijk)	2011	Non-album singles
"No. 1" (DZ Dioniziz featuring Stig van Eijk)	2013	Non-album singles
"Gonna Make It" (Kastaway featuring Stig van Eijk)	2013	Non-album singles
"Like a Freak" (2Ugly2Hold featuring Anja Enerud and Stig van Eijk)	2017	Non-album singles
"Words Unsaid" (Kastaway featuring Stig van Eijk)	2017	My Life in Music 2
"That's What She Said" (Frank Nitt featuring Stig van Eijk and Kamikazi)	2018	Non-album single
"Without Faith" (Nuno Barroso featuring Stig van Eijk)	2020	Amigos & Duetos
"Fra obos te Europa" (Kiks the Band featuring Christine Guldbrandsen, Stig van Eijk, Piddi, and Geo Pardalos)	2023	Non-album single

==== As part of The Soul Express Orchestra ====
Single	Year	Album or EP
"Come"	2010	Time for a Change
"Do You Love Me Anymore"	2010	Bergensbølgene: et dykk i Bergens pop og rockhistorie

==== As part of Black Ballroom ====
Single	Year	Album or EP
"Rainy Town"	2018	Medication Won't Heal You This Time
"Your Mind is a Gun"	2020	Medication Won't Heal You This Time
"Things I'm Not Supposed to Know"	2022	Medication Won't Heal You This Time

Preceded by Lars A. Fredriksen with "Alltid sommer"	Norway in the Eurovision Song Contest; 1999	Succeeded by Charmed with "My Heart Goes Boom"
