= Ireland in the Eurovision Song Contest 1999 =

- Eurovision Song Contest 1999
- Participating broadcaster: Radio Telefís Éireann (RTÉ)
- Country: Ireland
- Selection process: Eurosong '99
- Selection date: 7 March 1999

Competing entry
- Song: "When You Need Me"
- Artist: The Mullans
- Songwriter: Bronagh Mullan

Placement
- Final result: 17th, 18 points

Participation chronology

Ireland was represented at the Eurovision Song Contest 1999 with the song "When You Need Me", written by Bronagh Mullan, and performed by The Mullans. The Irish participating broadcaster, Radio Telefís Éireann (RTÉ), selected its entry through a national final.

== Before Eurovision ==
=== Eurosong '99 ===
==== Réalta '99 ====
Réalta was a radio song contest started in 1995 by RTÉ Raidió na Gaeltachta exclusively for Irish songs. The first edition of the contest was not related to Eurosong, but from 1996 until 1999, the recent winner of Réalta would qualify to Eurosong. Ten songs were chosen to compete in the 5th edition of Réalta and, starting on 2 December 1998, one song was presented each day between 10:30 and 11:00 (GMT) on the radio show Ar Maidin. The final of Réalta '99 was broadcast at 10:00 (GMT) on 18 December 1998 and was hosted by Seán Ó hÉanaigh. The results of Réalta '99 were decided by a 3-member jury consisting of Carrie Crowley, Eithne Ní Uallacháin, and Cian Ó Ciobháin. However, the running order and results of Réalta '99 are unknown.

Artist	Song	Songwriter(s)
Brendan Devereaux	"An tíogar ceilteach"	Maoilre de Búrca, Brendan Devereaux
Brighdin Carr & Tina McDaid	"Saor"	Brighdin Carr
Cathal Ó Catháin	"Is fiú is féidir"	Cathal Ó Catháin
Colm Mac Séalaigh	"Eileanóir"	Colm Mac Séalaigh
Damian Mac Gabhann	"Is féidir linn"	Damian Mac Gabhann
Helen Uí Dhunáird	"Oileán intinne"	Seán Ó Coisdealbha, Helen Uí Dhunáird
Máiré Ní Mhaoilbhín	"Glór na dtonn"	Siobhán Ní Mhurchú, Micheál Ó hAllmhuráin
Maria NÍ Chumhaill	"Tamall dom"	Éamonn Friel, Dave Duggan
Pól Ó Colmáin	"Siúil amach an doras"	Pól Ó Colmáin
Proinsias Mac an Tuile	"An bon bon carr"	Proinsias Mac an Tuile, Bríd Ní Mhurchú

==== Final ====
RTÉ held Eurosong '99 on 7 March at the RTÉ Television Centre in Dublin, hosted by Pat Kenny. Eight artists and songs were selected to compete which were presented on 9 January 1999 on the RTÉ show Kenny Live. Regional televoting determined the winner and after the combination of votes, "When You Need Me" performed by the Mullans was selected as the winner.

Final – 7 March 1999
R/O	Artist	Song	Songwriter(s)	Points	Place
1	Nigel Connell	"I Believed"	Danny Sheerin, Des Sheerin	37	6
2	Brendan Keeley	"You Must Have Been Crazy"	Brendan Keeley, Graham Murphy	66	2
3	Barry Doyle	"Run to Me"	Barry Doyle	22	8
4	Tommy Quinn	"You Can't Fight It"	John Fitzpatrick	27	7
5	Maggie Toal and Andy McComish	"I Won't Ever Let You Go"	Stephen Nimmon	57	3
6	Doona	"An bon bon carr"	Proínsias Mac an Tuile, Bríd Ní Mhurchú	48	4
7	Gary O'Shaughnessy	"I'll Be There"	Denise Reynolds	44	5
8	The Mullans	"When You Need Me"	Bronagh Mullan	84	1

Detailed Regional Televoting Results
Song	Dialling codes							Total
Song	05	02	06	09	07	04	01	Total
Song	Waterford	Cork	Limerick	Galway	Sligo	Dundalk	Dublin	Total
"I Believed"	5	5	5	6	5	6	5	37
"You Must Have Been Crazy"	10	10	10	8	8	10	10	66
"Run to Me"	3	3	3	3	3	3	4	22
"You Can't Fight It"	4	4	4	4	4	4	3	27
"I Won't Ever Let You Go"	8	8	8	7	10	8	8	57
"An bon bon carr"	6	7	7	10	7	5	6	48
"I'll Be There"	7	6	6	5	6	7	7	44
"When You Need Me"	12	12	12	12	12	12	12	84

== At Eurovision ==
The Mullans performed 17th in the running order on the evening of the contest. "When You Need Me" picked up 18 points, finishing in 17th place.

=== Voting ===
Points awarded to Ireland
Score	Country
12 points	Lithuania
10 points	
8 points	
7 points	
6 points	
5 points	
4 points	United Kingdom
3 points	
2 points	
1 point	Norway; Turkey

Points awarded by Ireland
Score	Country
12 points	Slovenia
10 points	Belgium
8 points	Estonia
7 points	Denmark
6 points	Croatia
5 points	Sweden
4 points	Iceland
3 points	Norway
2 points	France
1 point	Netherlands
