= Austria in the Eurovision Song Contest 2000 =

- Eurovision Song Contest 2000
- Participating broadcaster: Österreichischer Rundfunk (ORF)
- Country: Austria
- Selection process: Internal selection
- Announcement date: Artist: 22 February 2000; Song: 29 February 2000

Competing entry
- Song: "All to You"
- Artist: The Rounder Girls
- Songwriter: Dave Moskin

Placement
- Final result: 14th, 34 points

Participation chronology

Austria was represented at the Eurovision Song Contest 2000 with the song "All to You", written by Dave Moskin, and performed by the group the Rounder Girls. The Austrian participating broadcaster Österreichischer Rundfunk (ORF), internally selected its entry for the contest. The broadcaster announced that it had internally selected the Rounder Girls as its representative, while "All to You" was presented to the public on 29 February 2000 during the ORF programme Metropol.

Austria competed in the Eurovision Song Contest which took place on 13 May 2000. Performing as the closing entry during the show in position 24, Austria placed fourteenth out of the 24 participating countries, scoring 34 points.

== Background ==
Prior to the 2000 contest, Österreichischer Rundfunk (ORF) has participated in the Eurovision Song Contest representing Austria thirty-seven times since its first entry in 1957. It has won the contest on one occasion: in 1966 with the song "Merci, Chérie" performed by Udo Jürgens. Its least successful result has been last place, achieved on seven occasions, most recently in 1991. It has also received nul points on three occasions; in 1962, in 1988, and in 1991.

As part of its duties as participating broadcaster, ORF organises the selection of its entry in the Eurovision Song Contest and broadcasts the event in the country. Since 1995, the broadcaster has held an internal selection to choose its artist and song at the contest, a method which was continued to select its entry for the 2000 contest.

== Before Eurovision ==
=== Internal selection ===
Between December 1999 and January 2000, ORF invited all interested artists to submit their songs to the broadcaster. The broadcaster received 543 submissions at the close of the deadline, which were reviewed by a panel of ORF entertainment editors. 80 entries were longlisted from these submissions before a final shortlist was compiled. The presentation of the Austrian entry was scheduled to take place on 28 February 2000, however ORF announced on 22 February 2000 during their evening news broadcast Zeit im Bild that they had internally selected the group the Rounder Girls to represent Austria in Stockholm following a media leak. The Rounder Girls, which consisted of singers Tini Kainrath, Lynne Kieran and Kim Cooper, was selected by a panel of music and television industry experts, costume designers and choreographers following a live casting round of the shortlisted acts. The Austrian entry for the contest "All to You", written by Dave Moskin who was also behind the 1999 Austrian Eurovision entry "Reflection", was presented on 29 February 2000 during the ORF programme Metropol, hosted by Andi Knoll.

The decision to select the Rounder Girls, a group that featured two black artists (Kieran and Cooper), as the Austrian representative was viewed as a political statement by ORF as the country's government faced diplomatic sanctions from other EU member states at that time due to the inclusion of the right-wing populist Freedom Party of Austria (FPÖ) in a coalition government; the group members previously participated in public demonstrations against the formation of the coalition government and the anti-immigration policies of the FPÖ.

== At Eurovision ==
According to the Eurovision rules, the 24-country participant list for the contest was composed of: the winning country from the previous year's contest; the "Big Four" countries which provided the highest financial backing for the contest (France, Germany, Spain and the United Kingdom); the 18 countries, other than the previous year's winner and "Big Four" countries, which had obtained the highest average number of points over the last five contests; and any countries which had not participated in the previous year's content. Austria was one of the 18 countries with the highest average scores, and thus were permitted to participate. On 21 November 1999, an allocation draw was held which determined the running order and Austria was set to close the show and perform in position 24, following the entry from Ireland. Austria finished in fourteenth place with 34 points.

The show was broadcast in Austria on ORF 1 with commentary by Andi Knoll and via radio on FM4 with commentary by Stermann and Grissemann.

=== Voting ===
Below is a breakdown of points awarded to Austria and awarded by Austria in the contest. The nation awarded its 12 points to Germany in the contest.

ORF appointed Dodo Roscic as its spokesperson to announce the Austrian votes during the show.

Points awarded to Austria
Score	Country
12 points	
10 points	
8 points	Spain
7 points	
6 points	
5 points	Latvia
4 points	Switzerland; Turkey
3 points	Finland; Iceland
2 points	Germany; Ireland; Malta
1 point	United Kingdom

Points awarded by Austria
Score	Country
12 points	Germany
10 points	Denmark
8 points	Latvia
7 points	Russia
6 points	Croatia
5 points	Turkey
4 points	Ireland
3 points	Estonia
2 points	Malta
1 point	Switzerland
