= Latvia in the Eurovision Song Contest 2000 =

- Eurovision Song Contest 2000
- Participating broadcaster: Latvian Television (LTV)
- Country: Latvia
- Selection process: Eirodziesma 2000
- Selection date: 26 February 2000

Competing entry
- Song: "My Star"
- Artist: Brainstorm
- Songwriter: Renārs Kaupers

Placement
- Final result: 3rd, 136 points

Participation chronology

Latvia was represented at the Eurovision Song Contest 2000 with the song "My Star", written by Renārs Kaupers, and performed with his band Brainstorm. The Latvian participating broadcaster, Latvian Television (LTV), organised the national final Eirodziesma 2000 in order to select its entry for the contest. This was the first-ever entry from Latvia in the Eurovision Song Contest.

Ten songs were selected to compete in the national final on 26 February 2000 where a public televote and a fourteen-member jury panel selected "My Star" performed by Brainstorm as the winner.

Latvia competed in the Eurovision Song Contest which took place on 13 May 2000. Performing during the show in position 21, Latvia placed third out of the 24 participating countries, scoring 136 points.

== Background ==
On 15 December 1999, the Latvian national broadcaster, Latvian Television (LTV), confirmed its intentions to debut at the Eurovision Song Contest in its 2000 edition. That decision was motivated by the participation of the broadcasters from Estonia and Lithuania as well as having received sufficient funds for participation through sponsorships. LTV had previously planned to debut at the contest in 1993 and 1999; the latter year it withdrew its application due to financial problems. LTV had broadcast the 1998 and 1999 contests in the country. Along with the participation confirmation, the broadcaster confirmed that its entry for the 2000 contest would be selected through the national selection show Eirodziesma.

== Before Eurovision ==
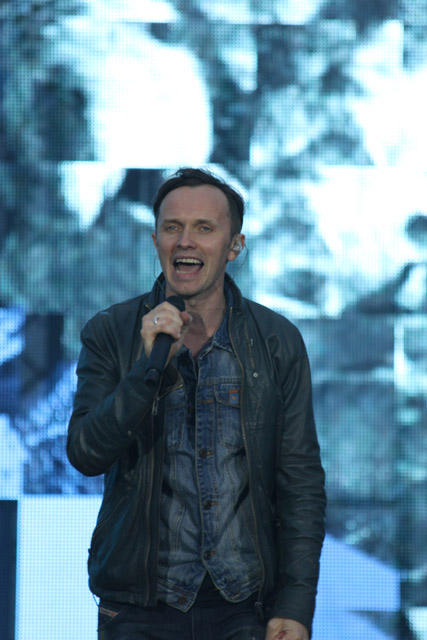
"My Star" was written and composed by Brainstorm's lead singer Renārs Kaupers (pictured in 2015)

=== Eirodziesma 2000 ===
To select its entry for the Eurovision Song Contest 2000, LTV hosted a national final, entitled Eirodziesma 2000, on 26 February 2000 at its television studios in Zaķusala, Riga. The national final was hosted by Dita Torstere and broadcast on LTV1. Prior to the event, LTV opened a submissions window for interested artists and composers to submit their songs for consideration, by the close of which, 67 songs were submitted and 14 performers applied for the contest; twelve competing entries were then selected for the competition. Two songs were later disqualified prior to the competition. Ten remaining entries competed with the winning song determined by the combination of votes from a jury panel and public televoting. At the close of voting, "My Star" performed by Brainstorm received the most votes and was selected as the Latvian entry. In addition to the performances of the competing entries, Feliks Kigelis, Linga, Liga Robezniece and Quentin Elias performed as special guests.

R/O	Artist	Song	Jury	Televote		Total	Place
R/O	Artist	Song	Jury	Votes	Points	Total	Place
1	Marija Naumova	"For You My Friends"	106	95	8	114	2
2	Yana Kay	"Waterfall"	80	6	1	81	6
3	Jānis Stībelis	"I Will Return"	58	31	4	62	8
4	Dace Pūce, Aigars Grāvers and Arnis Heidermanis	"Tāda zeme"	62	37	5	67	7
5	Arnis Mednis	"Everyday in Circle"	75	53	7	82	5
6	Madara Celma	"Close to You"	47	18	2	49	10
7	Brainstorm	"My Star"	135	227	12	147	1
8	Linda Leen	"Let's Go Insane"	102	55	6	108	4
9	Agnese	"Knowing Love and Loss"	48	15	3	51	9
10	Yana Kay	"Set My Heart on Fire"	99	202	10	109	3

Detailed Jury Votes
R/O	Song	Musicians				International				Media			Cultural			Total
R/O	Song	Juror 1	Juror 2	Juror 3	Juror 4	Juror 1	Juror 2	Juror 3	Juror 4	Juror 1	Juror 2	Juror 3	Juror 1	Juror 2	Juror 3	Total
1	"For You My Friends"	10	6	3	7	3	10	10	6	8	6	12	10	10	5	106
2	"Waterfall"	7	7	2	3	7	8	5	10	6	4	8	7	4	2	80
3	"I Will Return"	6	5	10	2	5	2	4	3	4	5	4	4	3	1	58
4	"Tāda zeme"	5	3	6	4	2	3	1	4	3	10	3	6	5	7	62
5	"Everyday in Circle"	4	4	1	6	1	4	3	7	5	8	5	5	12	10	75
6	"Close to You"	3	2	4	1	6	5	2	2	2	3	6	2	1	8	47
7	"My Star"	12	8	12	12	4	12	8	8	10	7	10	12	8	12	135
8	"Let's Go Insane"	8	12	5	8	8	7	7	5	12	12	7	3	2	6	102
9	"Knowing Love and Loss"	2	1	8	5	10	1	6	1	1	2	1	1	6	3	48
10	"Set My Heart on Fire"	1	10	7	10	12	6	12	12	7	1	2	8	7	4	99

Members of the Jury
Jury	Members
Musicians	Ainars Mielavs – musician; Uldis Marhilēvičs – musician; Boriss Rezņiks – producer; Gatis Gaujenieks – sound recording director
International members	Munro Forbes (United Kingdom); Kato Martins Hansen (Norway); Milan Marche (Yugoslavia); Quentin Elias (France)
Media representatives	Ēriks Niedra – Easy FM; Uģis Polis – Super FM; Ivo Baumanis – Biznes & Baltiya
Cultural workers	Vija Virtmane – Director of the Cultural Policy Department of the Latvian Ministry of Culture; Ineta Ķirse – choreographer; Rolands Tjarve – General Director of LTV

== At Eurovision ==
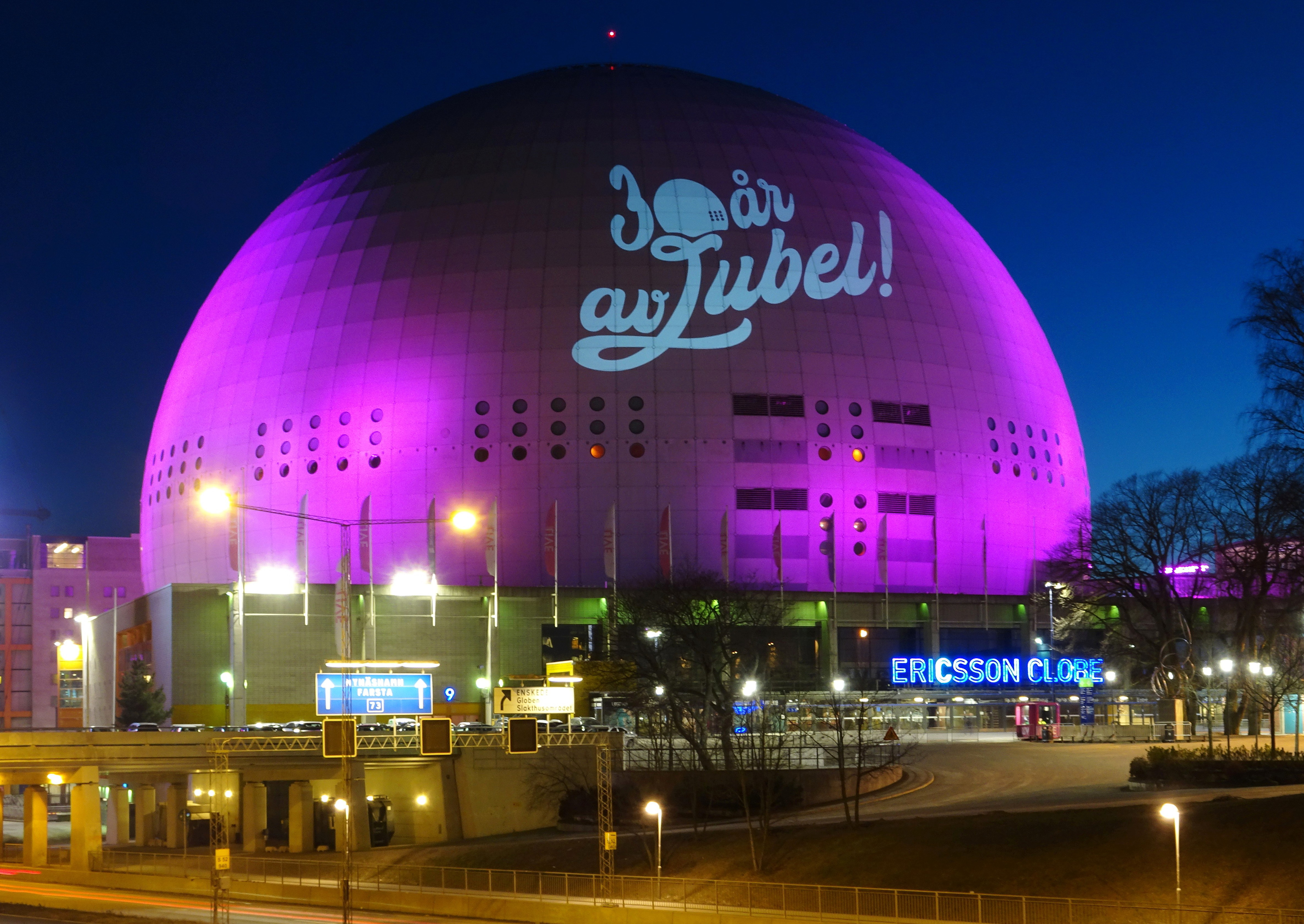
The Eurovision Song Contest 2000 took place at the Globe Arena in Stockholm, Sweden, on 13 May 2000.

The Eurovision Song Contest 2000 took place at the Globe Arena in Stockholm, Sweden, on 13 May 2000. According to the Eurovision rules, the 24-country participant list for the contest was composed of: the previous year's winning country and host nation Sweden, "Big Four" countries, the thirteen countries, which had obtained the highest average points total over the preceding five contests, and any eligible countries which did not compete in the 1999 contest. Latvia was one of the eligible countries which did not compete in the 1999 contest, and thus were permitted to participate. The running order for the contest was decided by a draw held on 21 November 1999; Latvia was assigned to perform 21st at the 2000 contest, following Finland and preceding Turkey. Eurovision Song Contest 2000 was televised in Latvia on LTV with the commentary by Kārlis Streips. The contest was watched by a total of 380 thousand viewers in Latvia with the market share of 42%.

The Latvian performance featured Brainstorm members performing with instruments on stage in a band set-up. The stage colours were predominantly blue and green and the LED screens displayed blue and green leaves. After the voting concluded, Latvia scored 136 points, including 4 sets of highest score of 12 points, from Belgium, Estonia, Finland, and Norway; and placed 3rd.

=== Voting ===
The same voting system in use since 1975 was again implemented for 2000 contest, with each country providing 1–8, 10 and 12 points to the ten highest-ranking songs as determined by a selected jury or the viewing public through televoting, with countries not allowed to vote for themselves. Latvia had intended to use televoting, however, due to a technical failure of the telephone system caused by an unexpectedly large number of votes being cast, the votes of jury panel were instead used to determine nation's points. LTV appointed Lauris Reiniks as its spokesperson to announce the Latvian votes during the final. Below is a breakdown of points awarded to Latvia and awarded by Latvia in the grand final of the contest. The nation awarded its 12 points to Denmark in the contest.

After the contest, the Latvian jury votes in the final faced scrutiny in Russian media. Latvian jury didn't award Russia any points; this led to some suggesting that the Latvian jury votes might have been politically influenced. Prime Minister of Latvia Andris Berzins later denied accusations of politicisation of the Latvian jury, saying that "this case cannot be politicised".

Points awarded to Latvia
Score	Country
12 points	Belgium; Estonia; Finland; Norway
10 points	Iceland; Sweden
8 points	Austria; Denmark; Ireland
7 points	Germany; Spain; Switzerland; United Kingdom
6 points	
5 points	
4 points	Israel; Netherlands
3 points	France; Macedonia
2 points	
1 point	Cyprus; Russia

Points awarded by Latvia
Score	Country
12 points	Denmark
10 points	Estonia
8 points	Germany
7 points	Iceland
6 points	Norway
5 points	Austria
4 points	Malta
3 points	United Kingdom
2 points	Switzerland
1 point	Ireland
