= Croatia in the Eurovision Song Contest 2000 =

- Eurovision Song Contest 2000
- Participating broadcaster: Croatian Radiotelevision (HRT)
- Country: Croatia
- Selection process: Dora 2000
- Selection date: 19 February 2000

Competing entry
- Song: "Kad zaspu anđeli"
- Artist: Goran Karan
- Songwriters: Nenad Ninčević; Zdenko Runjić

Placement
- Final result: 9th, 70 points

Participation chronology

Croatia was represented at the Eurovision Song Contest 2000 with the song "Kad zaspu anđeli", composed by Zdenko Runjić, with lyrics by Nenad Ninčević, and performed by Goran Karan. The Croatian participating broadcaster, Croatian Radiotelevision (HRT), organised the national final Dora 2000 to select its entry for the contest. Twenty-six entries competed in the national final on 19 February 2000 and "Ostani" performed by Goran Karan was selected as the winner following the combination of votes from 20 regional juries and a public televote. The song was later retitled as "Kad zaspu anđeli".

Croatia competed in the Eurovision Song Contest which took place on 13 May 2000. Performing during the show in position 17, Croatia placed ninth out of the 24 participating countries, scoring 70 points.

== Background ==
Prior to the 2000 Contest, Croatian Radiotelevision (HRT) had participated in the Eurovision Song Contest representing Croatia seven times since its first entry in 1993. Its best result in the contest was fourth, which it achieved on two occasions: in 1996 with the song "Sveta ljubav" performed by Maja Blagdan and in 1999 with the song "Marija Magdalena" performed by Doris Dragović.

As part of its duties as participating broadcaster, HRT organises the selection of its entry in the Eurovision Song Contest and broadcasts the event in the country. Between 1993 and 1999, the broadcaster organised the national final Dora in order to select its entry for the contest, a method that continued for its 2000 participation.

== Before Eurovision ==
=== Dora 2000 ===
Dora 2000 was the eighth edition of the national selection Dora organised by HRT to select its entry for the Eurovision Song Contest 2000. The competition consisted of twenty entries competing in one final on 19 February 2000 at the Hotel Kvarner in Opatija, hosted by Vlatka Pokos and Marko Rašica. The show was broadcast on HTV1 and via radio on HR 2 as well as online via the broadcaster's website hrt.hr.

==== Competing entries ====
320 entries were received by HRT which previously opened a submission period for artists and composers to submit their entries to the broadcaster. A nine-member expert committee consisting of Ksenija Urličić, Ljudevit Grgurić, Mario Bogliuni, Hrvoje Hegedušić, Ante Batinović, Željko Mesar, Ljubo Karamatić, Duško Knežević and Jasna Ceković reviewed the received submissions and selected twenty-six artists and songs for the competition. Among the artists were Putokazi which represented Croatia in 1993 as Put with different group members, and Cronika which represented Croatia in 1995 as Magazin with a different lead singer.

==== Final ====
The final took place on 19 February 2000. The winner, "Ostani" performed by Goran Karan, was determined by a combination of votes from 20 regional juries and a public televote with the same weight as one jury. In addition to the performances of the competing entries, Davor Radolfi and Ritmo Loco as well as Doris Dragović, who represented Yugoslavia in 1986 and Croatia in 1999, performed as the interval acts during the show.

Final – 19 February 2000
R/O	Artist	Song	Songwriter(s)	Points	Place
1	Zorana Šiljeg	"Mogla bih te voljeti"	Zorana Šiljeg	14	13
2	Boris Novković	"Oprostit' ćemo sve"	Denis Dumančić, Boris Novković	33	11
3	Andrea Bošnjak	"Vjerujem ti sve"	Andrea Bošnjak	0	23
4	Izabela and Stijene	"Sama među zvijezdama"	Marin Krečimir Limić	8	18
5	Dea	"I Wanna to Fly"	Dijana Alebić, Zoran Marković, Ivo Lesić	4	20
6	Alen Vitasović	"Ja ne gren"	Robert Pilepić	63	9
7	Tajna veza	"Samo ti i ja"	Joško Markov, Slobodan Mišević, Jasminko Šetka	0	23
8	Giuliano	"Srna i vuk"	Nenad Ninčević, Tomislav Mrduljaš	160	3
9	Josip Katalenić	"Put u raj"	Rajko Dujmić, Nenad Ninčević	44	10
10	Renata Sabljak	"Za tebe živjeti"	Sanja Mudrinić, Željen Klašterka	13	15
11	Tina and Nikša	"Nikome nije dobro kao nama"	Stevo Cvikić, Fedor Boić	30	12
12	Minea	"Što bi mi"	Tonči Huljić, Vjekoslava Huljić	12	16
13	Two much	"Oblake sada pokreni"	Dijana Malenica, Tomislav Mrduljaš	8	18
14	Severina	"Daj mi, daj"	Severina Vučković	64	8
15	Dogan Family	"Kad se voli"	Nenad Ninčević, Goran Mačužić	11	17
16	Cronika	"Hrvatska rapsodija"	Tonči Huljić, Vjekoslava Huljić	101	5
17	Teens	"Hajde reci što"	Andrej Babić, Mario Šimunović	116	4
18	Vanna	"Kao rijeka"	Bruno Kovačić, Ivana Plechinger	164	2
19	Vesna Pisarović	"Ja čekam noć"	Milana Vlaović	90	6
20	Goran Karan	"Ostani"	Nenad Ninčević, Zdenko Runjić	172	1
21	Anita Horvatić	"Dobro, bolje, najbolje"	Antia Horvatić, Marko Tomasović	0	23
22	Alen Nižetić	"Hrabro srce"	Nenad Ninčević	4	20
23	Jozefina and Trio Rio	"Love Me Tonight"	Branko Fučak	3	22
24	Putokazi	"Helleya, planet 'Nova zemlja'"	Elvis Stanić	90	6
25	Joy	"Baby"	Marko Tomasović, Boris Šuput	14	13
26	Vesna Ivić	"Idi"	Dijana Malenica, Tomislav Mrduljaš	0	23

Detailed Voting Results
R/O	Song	Bjelovar	Čakovec	Dubrovnik	Gospić	Karlovac	Koprivnica	Krapina	Osijek	Pazin	Požega	Rijeka	Sisak	Slavonski Brod	Split	Šibenik	Varaždin	Virovitica	Vukovar	Zadar	Zagreb	Televote	Total
1	"Mogla bih te voljeti"	1		7					5		1												14
2	"Oprostit ćemo sve na mom jastuku"	3	4			3							12		5		4				1	1	33
3	"Vjerujem ti sve"																						0
4	"Sama među zvijezdama"			1			1	2				1			3								8
5	"I Wanna to Fly"																					4	4
6	"Ja ne gren"				3		4	3	1	10	8	4		12	10	3					5		63
7	"Samo ti i ja"																						0
8	"Srna i vuk"	10	6		10	7	12	6	7	6	5	8	6	6	12	12	6	6	12	3	10	10	160
9	"Put u raj"		12	2			7				2	2	3	4			12						44
10	"Za tebe živjeti"		2			1				3		3									4		13
11	"Nikom nije dobro ko nama"				2	2			6							7	1	3	1	2	6		30
12	"Što bi mi"		3	3	1																	5	12
13	"Oblake sada pokreni"															8							8
14	"Daj mi, daj"				6	5	5	1	10	1	4			5	4	1		4	5	5		8	64
15	"Kad se voli"	4													6			1					11
16	"Hrvatska rapsodija"	2	5	5	7		2	8		12	6		10	7	2		5	2	8	6	8	6	101
17	"Hajde reci što"	7	7	8	4	4		5	8	5		6	5	1	1	10	2	12	3	4	12	12	116
18	"Kao rijeka"	8	8	10	8	10	10	10	4	8	7	12	7	10	7	4	8	8	10	8	7		164
19	"Ja čekam noć"	6		4	5	6	3	4	2	4	12	5	4	2		6	3	7	7	7		3	90
20	"Ostani"	12	10	12	12	12	8	12	12	2	10	7	8	8		5	10	10	2	10	3	7	172
21	"Dobro, bolje, najbolje"																						0
22	"Hrabro srce"												2			2							4
23	"Love Me Tonight"													3									3
24	"Helleya, planet 'Nova zemlja'"	5	1			8	6	7	3	7	3	10			8		7	5	6	12	2		90
25	"Baby"			6									1						4	1		2	14
26	"Idi"																						0

== At Eurovision ==
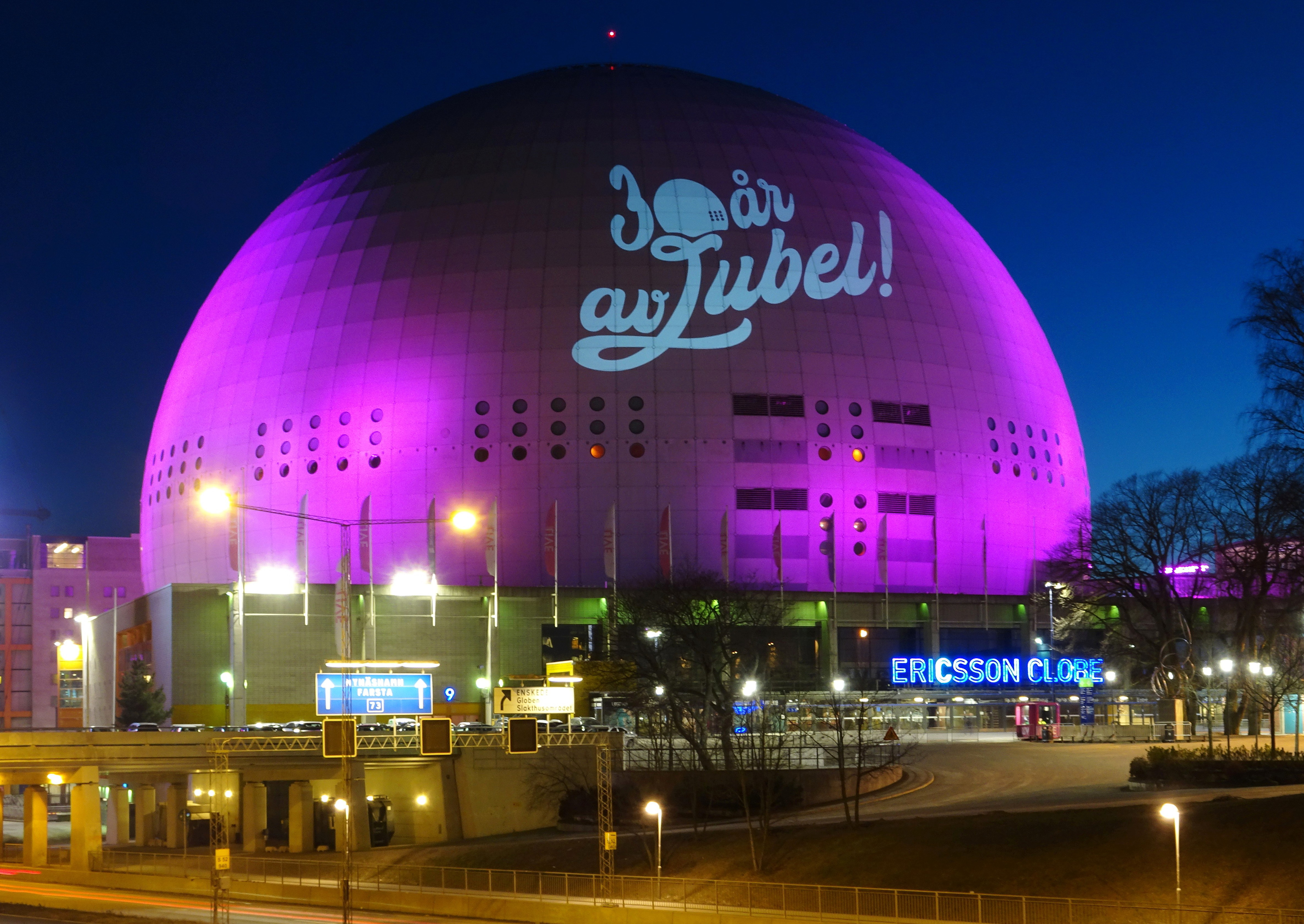
The Eurovision Song Contest 2000 took place at the Globe Arena in Stockholm, Sweden, on 13 May 2000.

The Eurovision Song Contest 2000 took place at Globe Arena in Stockholm, Sweden, on 13 May 2000. According to Eurovision rules, the participants list included the previous year's winning country, the "Big Four" countries (France, Germany, Spain and the United Kingdom), the countries with the highest average scores between the 1995 and 1999 contests, and any countries which had not competed in the 1999 contest. On 21 November 1999, an allocation draw was held which determined the running order and Croatia was set to perform in position 17, following the entry from Switzerland and before the entry from Sweden. Croatia finished in ninth place with 70 points.

The contest was broadcast in Croatia on HTV1.

=== Voting ===
Below is a breakdown of points awarded to Croatia and awarded by Croatia in the contest. The nation awarded its 12 points to Russia in the contest.

HRT appointed Marko Rašica as its spokesperson to announce the results of the Croatian televote during the broadcast.

Points awarded to Croatia
Score	Country
12 points	
10 points	Macedonia; Russia
8 points	France; Romania; Turkey
7 points	
6 points	Austria; Finland; Germany; Switzerland
5 points	
4 points	
3 points	
2 points	Spain
1 point	

Points awarded by Croatia
Score	Country
12 points	Russia
10 points	Macedonia
8 points	Malta
7 points	Romania
6 points	Estonia
5 points	Ireland
4 points	United Kingdom
3 points	Cyprus
2 points	Netherlands
1 point	Germany
