= Russia in the Eurovision Song Contest 2000 =

- Eurovision Song Contest 2000
- Country: Russia
- Selection process: Internal selection
- Announcement date: 11 March 2000

Competing entry
- Song: "Solo"
- Artist: Alsou
- Songwriters: Andrew Lane; Brandon Barnes

Placement
- Final result: 2nd, 155 points

Participation chronology

Russia was represented at the Eurovision Song Contest 2000 with the song "Solo", written by Andrew Lane and Brandon Barnes, and performed by Alsou. Public Russian Television (ORT) returned to the Eurovision Song Contest after a two-year absence following their relegation in 1998. ORT first announced that the Russian entry for the 2000 contest would be chosen through a televised national final, however, they later opted to choose the nation's representative internally by jury.

Prior to the contest, the entry was promoted by a music video and live performances in Riga, Tallinn and Saint Petersburg. Russia performed ninth out of the 24 countries competing in the contest and finished in second place, receiving 155 points and full 12-point marks from four countries. This marked the nation's highest placement in the contest at that time.

== Background ==
Prior to the 2000 contest, Russia had participated in the Eurovision Song Contest three times since its first entry in 1994. Russia missed the 1996 contest when its selected song "Ya eto ya" by Andrey Kosinsky failed to qualify from the qualifying round, was relegated from the 1998 contest due to a poor average score from the preceding contests, and was unable to partake in the 1999 contest after ORT didn't air the previous contest on television, which was a requirement for participation in 1999. By 2000, the country's best placing was ninth, which it achieved in 1994 with the song "Vechny strannik" performed by Youddiph.

The Russian national broadcaster ORT broadcasts the event within Russia and organises the selection process for the nation's entry. ORT confirmed their intentions to participate in the Eurovision Song Contest 2000 on 18 December 1999. Along with their participation confirmation, it was announced that a national final would be held to select the Russian entry; this aspect was later discarded.

== Before Eurovision ==
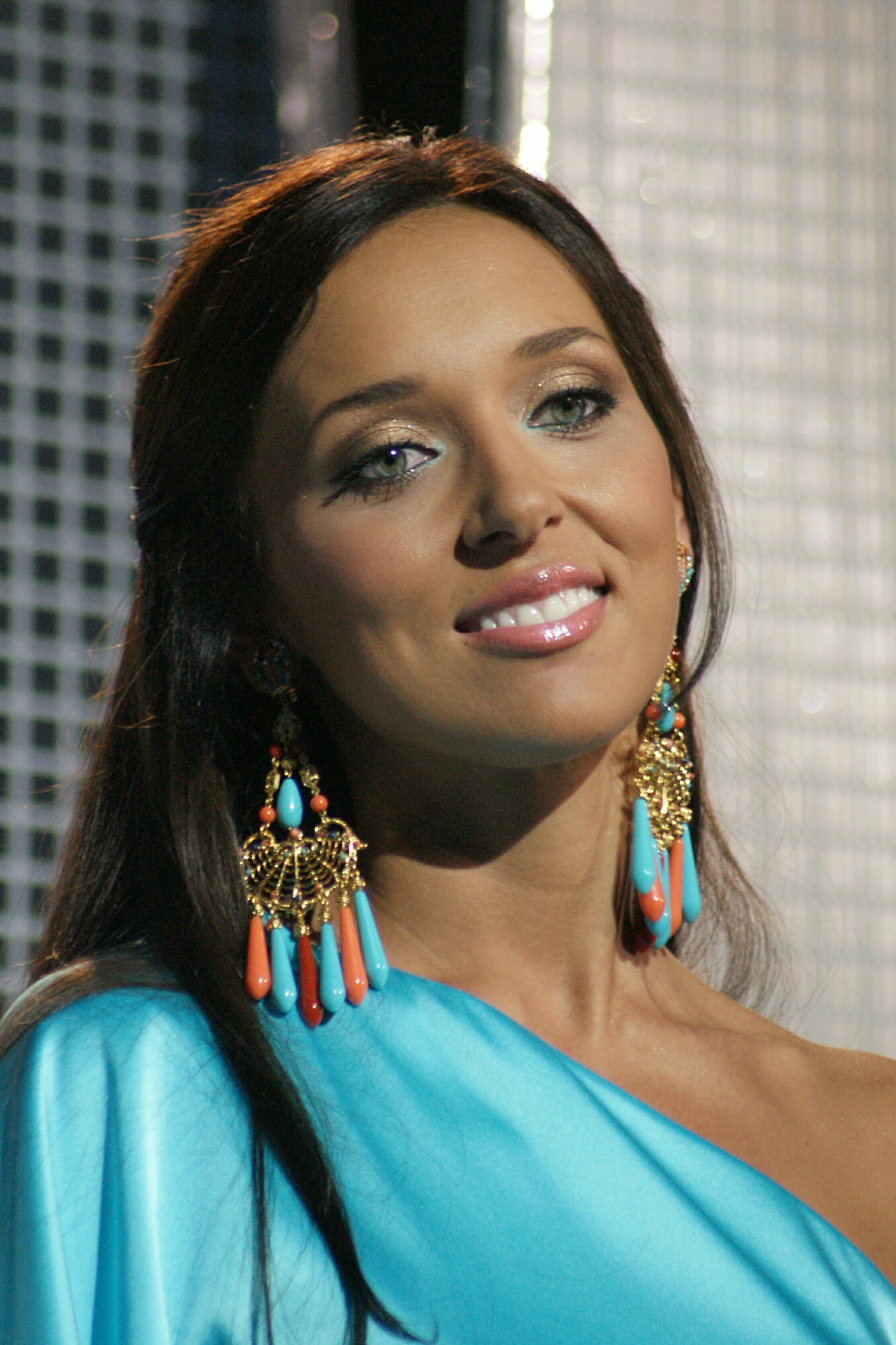
Alsou (pictured in 2009) was selected to represent Russia in the Eurovision Song Contest 2000

=== Internal selection ===
On 1 January 2000, ORT opened a submission period for interested artists and composers to submit their entries through 15 February 2000. The broadcaster received over 2000 applications at the conclusion of the deadline. (Note: Latvian newspaper Chas reported that music editorial office of ORT was "literally inundated with countless number" of different phonogram media, such as cassettes, CDs and CD-Rs. The range of quality and geography of the material sent was varied. Recordings made both at home and on professional studios, came from "unimaginable distances" of Russia, but a large share of the material was sent from Moscow, Saint Petersburg and their suburbs, as well as Bashkortostan and Tatarstan.) Among the submissions received by ORT included the song "Desyat mysley" by Chay Vdvoyom, as well as the entries from "Fonograph-Jazz-Band", Alla Sidorova, "Yula Frolova", and Andrey Misin. (Note: Olga Dzusova stated that she had received an invitation from ORT to participate in the selection, but she refused.) Plans for the national final were later abandoned by the broadcaster due to financial problems.

On 11 March 2000, ORT announced that they had internally selected Alsou to represent Russia in the Eurovision Song Contest 2000 with the song "Solo". Alsou's selection as the Russian representative was decided upon by a jury panel selected by ORT. Written by Andrew Lane and Brandon Barnes, the song became Russia's first entry to be performed in English at the contest. David Junk, managing director of Alsou's label Universal Music Russia, stated: "This is a great opportunity for us to introduce Alsou to Europe. She has already reached No. 1 in Russia with several songs, and now she has a chance to captivate European audiences." Following Alsou's selection, ORT announced that "Solo" would undergo remastering for the Eurovision Song Contest.

=== Promotion ===
Oliver Lepold and authors Karen Fricker and Milija Gluhovic opined that for the 2000 contest, Russia began to take the contest seriously and as part of that, the entry experienced increased financial and artistic investment over prior years. To promote the song as the Russian Eurovision entry, a music video for "Solo", directed by Debbie Bourn, was filmed in London. Alsou promoted "Solo" through live performances at Vernisazh Hall in Riga, Latvia on 8 April 2000, Decolte Club in Tallinn, Estonia on 9 April, and Oktyabrsky Concert Hall in Saint Petersburg, Russia on 10 and 11 April. On 4 May 2000, an online conference with Alsou was set up through official website of ORT. Besides Alsou, the conference was attended by Alsou's producer Valery Belotserkovsky, ORT music broadcasting producer Oleg Volnov and ORT CEO Konstantin Ernst. The singer also appeared in print media, having been interviewed by the Estonian newspaper Molodezh Estonii.

== At Eurovision ==
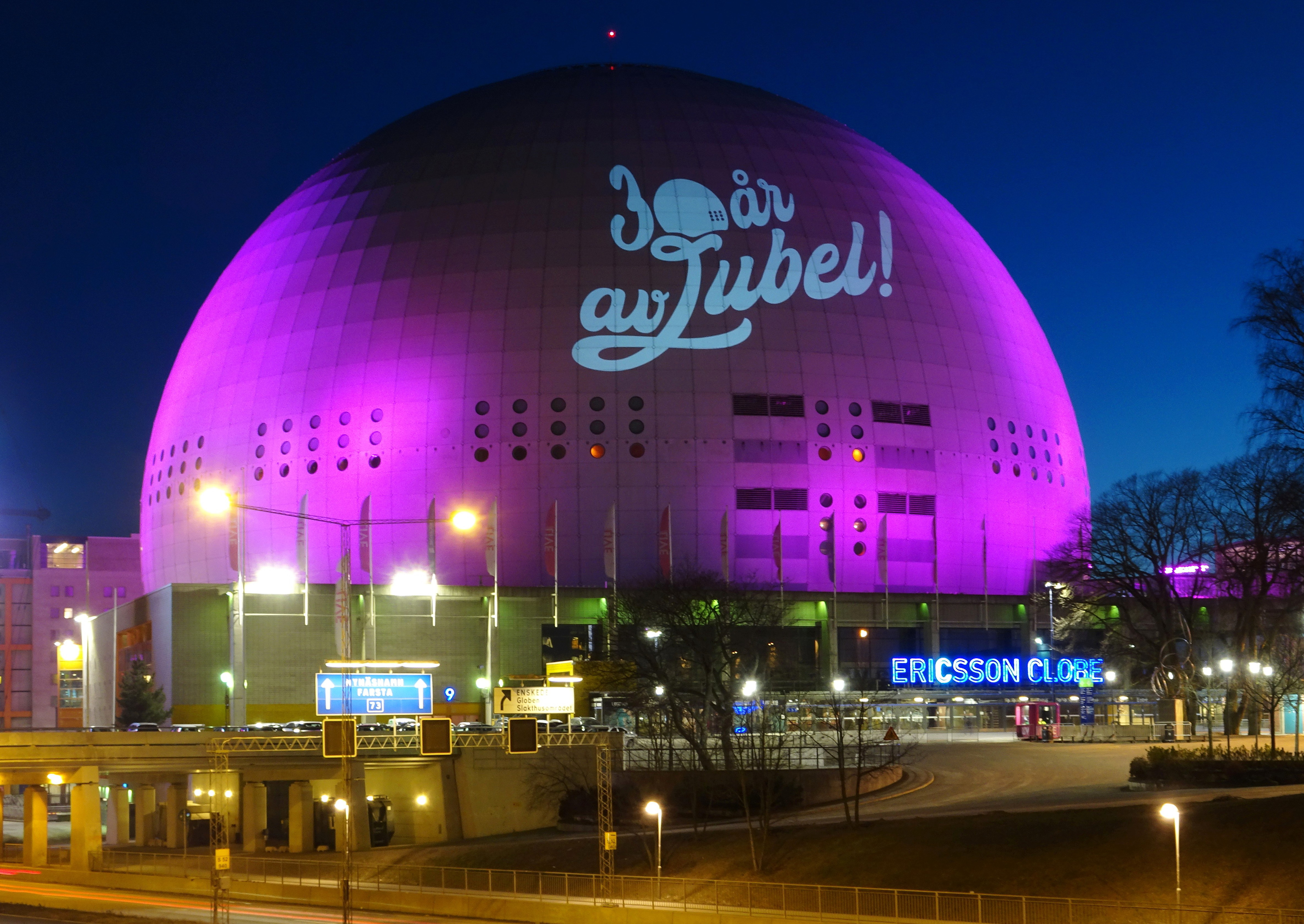
The Eurovision Song Contest 2000 took place at the Globe Arena in Stockholm, Sweden, on 13 May 2000.

The Eurovision Song Contest 2000 took place at the Globe Arena in Stockholm, Sweden, on 13 May 2000. Twenty-four nations participated, including the previous year's winning country and host nation Sweden, the "Big Four" countries, the 13 countries which had obtained the highest average points total over the preceding five contests, and any eligible countries which had not competed in the 1999 contest. As Russia did not compete in the 1999 contest, it was thus permitted to participate in 2000. The running order for the contest was decided by a draw held on 21 November 1999; Russia was assigned to perform 9th at the 2000 contest, following Norway and preceding Belgium. The contest was televised in Russia on ORT live on 13 May, with a delayed broadcast on 9 June.

Prior to the contest, Russia was considered by bookmakers to be the twelfth most likely country to win the competition. The Russian performance was choreographed by Sandra Dukes, and featured Alsou dressed in a pink glittery outfit designed by Maria Grachvogel, (Note: Alsou told L'Officiel Russia that she initially planned to wear a brown jumpsuit for her performance, but opted for a pink outfit.) performing a choreographed routine with two male dancers. The stage featured LED screen projections of blue smoke. During the performance, Alsou and the dancers were also accompanied by three backing vocalists. After the voting concluded, Russia scored 155 points, including four sets of the highest score of 12 points, from Croatia, Cyprus, Malta and Romania, and placed second. At the time, this result was Russia's best placing in its competitive history, and was the nation's first finish in the top three. Following the contest, the Russian delegation petitioned for contest winner Denmark's disqualification due to the use of a vocoder during their performance, however, the EBU did not pursue action and the results remained.

=== Voting ===
The same voting system in use since 1975 was again implemented for 2000 contest, with each country providing 1–8, 10 and 12 points to the ten highest-ranking songs as determined by a jury panel or the public through televoting, with countries not allowed to vote for themselves. Russia opted to assemble a jury panel to determine which countries would receive their points. The Russian spokesperson, who announced the points awarded by the Russian jury during the final, was Zhanna Agalakova.

Points awarded to Russia
Score	Country
12 points	Croatia; Cyprus; Malta; Romania
10 points	Estonia; Ireland; Israel
8 points	Iceland; Norway; United Kingdom
7 points	Austria; Belgium; Macedonia
6 points	Denmark
5 points	Finland; France; Spain; Sweden
4 points	Germany
3 points	
2 points	Switzerland
1 point	

Points awarded by Russia
Score	Country
12 points	Denmark
10 points	Croatia
8 points	Malta
7 points	Macedonia
6 points	Romania
5 points	Switzerland
4 points	Germany
3 points	France
2 points	Spain
1 point	Latvia

== After Eurovision ==
"Alsou's second-placing was seen by many as a triumph for her homeland, after recent Eurovision contests had brought humiliation for top flight Russian singers at the annual event – broadcast around the world to an audience estimated at 100 million viewers. Even though Alsou calls England home for now, her success caused a major splash in the national newspapers here. Several papers said the Eurovision result was sweet balm for national pride, wounded by the national hockey team's disastrously low 11th place at the world championships, which finished last Sunday in St. Petersburg."

— Alexander Bratersky from The Moscow Times on result's reception in Russia.

=== Reception ===
Russia's success at the contest was greeted with positive reactions in the Russian press; Vechernyaya Moskva proclaimed the result "a matter of national pride", while Kommersant opined that Alsou "has regained the national prestige that was ruined by Russian hockey" and labelled the result "near-triumph". Alsou herself stated that she did not expect such a result and was "immensely happy that [she] was able to support the musical glory" of Russia. On 26 May, a press conference dedicated to Alsou's participation in Eurovision was held in Moscow. At the conference, a film about Alsou's preparation for the contest and behind-the-scenes reports were shown. Following the contest, "Solo" was released as a single. In August 2000, it became the biggest-selling single in Russia, with 64,000 copies sold, and received a diamond certification from Universal Music. (Note: This record has been broken by Enrique Iglesias and Alsou song "You're My #1".)

=== Impact and legacy ===
Fricker and Gluhovic credited Russia's success in 2000 for starting the nation's "more focused and concerted pursuit of Eurovision gold", which included "consciously modeling their singers and musical material on Europop." Yana Nevskaya from Amurskaya Pravda expressed that after 2000, Eurovision has become an important and iconic contest for Russian viewers. Aleksey Kryzhevsky of Expert opined that country's placement "strengthened the foreign reputation of Russian pop". Journalists attributed Alsou's commercial success and rise in popularity to Russia's second-place finish. In a 2022 Billboard article, Junk said:

I wanted our artist Alsou to represent Russia at Eurovision because I was hoping it would help promote her new album in Europe. Access to 300 million television viewers across 24 countries – what a great opportunity. It was the first TV performance for this young 16-year-old girl. After a few poor placings, she brought prestige back to the country on an international stage.

Various Eurovision participants, such as 2011 Eurovision winners for Azerbaijan Ell & Nikki and 2018 Russian representative Yulia Samoylova, cited the performance as an influence for their own participations in the contest. Retrospectively, Alsou's performance was listed as one of the best Russian Eurovision performances by publications such as Cosmopolitan, STB, TV Centre and the Russian edition of Glamour magazine. MTS included the performance on their list of most iconic Eurovision performances, a 2016 Wiwibloggs poll resulted in "Solo" being chosen as the third-best Russian Top 5 Eurovision song, and in 2021, music critic Artem Makarsky, in an article for The Village, placed it at number 9 of his ranking of Russia's Eurovision performances.
