= Netherlands in the Eurovision Song Contest 2000 =

- Eurovision Song Contest 2000
- Participating broadcaster: Nederlandse Omroep Stichting (NOS)
- Country: Netherlands
- Selection process: Nationaal Songfestival 2000
- Selection date: 27 February 2000

Competing entry
- Song: "No Goodbyes"
- Artist: Linda Wagenmakers
- Songwriters: John O'Hare; Ellert Driessen

Placement
- Final result: 13th, 40 points

Participation chronology

The Netherlands was represented at the Eurovision Song Contest 2000 with the song "No Goodbyes", composed by Ellert Driessen, with lyrics by John O'Hare, and performed by Linda Wagenmakers. The Dutch participating broadcaster, Nederlandse Omroep Stichting (NOS), selected its entry for the contest through Nationaal Songfestival 2000. Eight entries competed in the national final on 27 February 2000 where "No Goodbyes" performed by Linda Wagenmakers was selected as the winner following the combination of votes from twelve regional juries and a public vote.

The Netherlands competed in the Eurovision Song Contest which took place on 13 May 2000. Performing during the show in position 2, the Netherlands placed thirteenth out of the 24 participating countries, scoring 40 points. The Dutch broadcast of the show was cut off one hour in due to the Enschede fireworks disaster earlier that day.

== Background ==
Prior to the 2000 contest, Nederlandse Televisie Stichting (NTS) until 1969, and Nederlandse Omroep Stichting (NOS) since 1970, had participated in the Eurovision Song Contest representing the Netherlands forty-one times since NTS début in the inaugural contest in 1956. They had won the contest four times: in 1957 with the song "Net als toen" performed by Corry Brokken; in 1959 with the song "'n Beetje" performed by Teddy Scholten; in 1969 as one of four countries to tie for first place with "De troubadour" performed by Lenny Kuhr; and finally in 1975 with "Ding-a-dong" performed by the group Teach-In. The least successful result at the time was last place, which they have achieved on four occasions, most recently in the 1968 contest. They has also received nul points on two occasions; in 1962 and 1963.

As part of its duties as participating broadcaster, NOS organises the selection of its entry in the Eurovision Song Contest and broadcasts the event in the country. The Dutch broadcasters had used various methods to select the Dutch entry in the past, such as the Nationaal Songfestival, a live televised national final to choose the performer, song or both to compete at Eurovision. However, internal selections have also been held on occasion. Since 1998, NOS has organised Nationaal Songfestival in order to select both the artist and song for the contest, a method that was continued for its 2000 entry.

== Before Eurovision ==
=== Nationaal Songfestival 2000 ===
Nationaal Songfestival 2000 was the national final developed by NOS that selected its entry for the Eurovision Song Contest 2000. Eight entries competed in the competition that consisted of a final on 27 February 2000 which took place at the Rotterdam Ahoy in Rotterdam, hosted by Paul de Leeuw and was broadcast on TV2. The first part of the national final was watched by 2.2 million viewers in the Netherlands with a market share of 38%, while the second part was watched by 2.6 million viewers with a market share of 45%, making it the most watched Nationaal Songfestival since 1988.

==== Competing entries ====
A submission period was opened by the Dutch broadcaster in July 1999 where artists and composers were able to submit their entries until 15 November 1999. In addition to the public submission, NOS directly invited certain composers to submit entries. 305 submissions were received by the broadcaster at the closing of the deadline, and the eight selected competing entries were announced on 18 January 2000. The selection of the entries for the competition occurred through the decision by a selection commission consisting of Willem van Beusekom, Saskia Bruning, Manuela Kemp, Humphrey Campbell, Ron Stoeltie and Jan Jaap de Kloet.

Artist	Song	Songwriter(s)
Alderliefste	"Evenwicht"	Eric van Tijn, Jochem Fluitsma
Arno Kolenbrander	"One Step Behind"	Peter de Wijn, Velibor Weller
Dewi	"Hit It Off"	Piet Souer, Dick Plat
Gina de Wit	"Hjir is it begjin"	Gina de Wit
Linda Wagenmakers	"No Goodbyes"	Ellert Driessen, John O'Hare
Sandy Kandau	"One Step Closer"	Ad van Olm
Splash	"Close Harmony"	Dick Bakker, Jonathan Ellis
Sonny	"Wawakilele"	Sonny Hoogwerf, Roland Gaedtgens, Huig Ouwehand

==== Final ====
The final took place on 27 February 2000 where eight entries competed. The winner, "No Goodbyes" performed by Linda Wagenmakers, was selected by the 50/50 combination of a public televote and the votes of twelve regional juries. The viewers and the juries each had a total of 384 points to award. Each jury group distributed their points as follows: 1, 2, 3, 4, 5, 7 and 10 points. Points from televoting were distributed pro rata. For example, if a song gained 10% of the vote, then that entry would be awarded 10% of 384 points rounded to the nearest integer: 38 points. The rounding of televoting points resulted in a slight discrepancy, with only 381 televoting points being awarded in total. In addition to the performances of the competing entries, the show featured guest performances by Charlotte Nilsson, who won Eurovision for Sweden in 1999.

Final – 27 February 2000
R/O	Artist	Song	Jury	Televote	Total	Place
1	Sandy Kandau	"One Step Closer"	47	12	59	6
2	Gina de Wit	"Hjir is it begjin"	38	38	76	5
3	Sonny	"Wawakilele"	46	39	85	4
4	Splash	"Close Harmony"	80	38	118	2
5	Linda Wagenmakers	"No Goodbyes"	106	146	252	1
6	Arno Kolenbrander	"One Step Behind"	35	80	115	3
7	Alderliefste	"Evenwicht"	27	15	42	7
8	Dewi	"Hit It Off"	5	13	18	8

Detailed Regional Jury Votes
Song	Limburg	Flevoland	North Holland	South Holland	Zeeland	North Brabant	Gelderland	Drenthe	Utrecht	Friesland	Groningen	Overijssel	Total
"One Step Closer"	4	3	5	3	1	5	4	5	7	2	3	5	47
"Hjir is it begjin"	1	1	3	2	7	3	2	1	2	10	2	4	38
"Wawakilele"	5	2	7	5	2	7	1	3	5	4	4	1	46
"Close Harmony"	7	7	4	10	10	4	10	7	4	5	5	7	80
"No Goodbyes"	10	10	10	7	5	10	7	10	10	7	10	10	106
"One Step Behind"	3	5	1	4	4		5	2	1		7	3	35
"Evenwicht"	2	4	2	1	3	2	3	4		3	1	2	27
"Hit It Off"						1			3	1			5

== At Eurovision ==
According to Eurovision rules, the 24-country participant list for the contest was composed of: the previous year's winning country and host nation Sweden, "Big Four" countries, the thirteen countries, which had obtained the highest average points total over the preceding five contests, and any eligible countries which did not compete in the 1999 contest. A special allocation draw was held which determined the running order and the Netherlands was set to perform in position 2, following the entry from Israel and before the entry from the United Kingdom. The Netherlands finished in thirteenth place with 40 points.

The show was broadcast in the Netherlands on TV2 with commentary by Willem van Beusekom as well as via radio on Radio 2 with commentary by Hijlco Span. However, one hour into the transmission of the contest, NOS took the decision to take the programme off the air in order to bring viewers live news updates from Enschede, where some hours earlier a huge explosion in a fireworks factory had devastated a section of the city and resulted in fatalities and serious injuries. A spokesman for NOS later stated that besides having a duty to keep their viewers informed of the current situation in Enschede, they felt it would have been inappropriate to continue with the broadcast of a light entertainment programme at such a time. A recap of the contest was eventually broadcast on 12 June 2000. The contest was watched by a total of 3 million viewers in the Netherlands.

=== Voting ===
Below is a breakdown of points awarded to the Netherlands and awarded by the Netherlands in the contest. The nation awarded its 12 points to the Turkey in the contest.

NOS appointed Marlayne, who represented the Netherlands in 1999, as its spokesperson to announce the Dutch voting results during the show. The suspension of transmission meant that the votes of the Dutch back-up jury were used, as no televoting had taken place. This fact was acknowledged by Marlayne during the presentation of the points.

Points awarded to the Netherlands
Score	Country
12 points	
10 points	
8 points	Belgium; Israel
7 points	
6 points	
5 points	Cyprus; Malta
4 points	Spain
3 points	Turkey
2 points	Croatia; France
1 point	Germany; Iceland; Ireland

Points awarded by the Netherlands
Score	Country
12 points	Turkey
10 points	Denmark
8 points	Germany
7 points	Estonia
6 points	Switzerland
5 points	Finland
4 points	Latvia
3 points	Ireland
2 points	France
1 point	Malta
