= Germany in the Eurovision Song Contest 2000 =

- Eurovision Song Contest 2000
- Participating broadcaster: ARD (Note: Arbeitsgemeinschaft der öffentlich-rechtlichen Rundfunkanstalten der Bundesrepublik Deutschland) – Norddeutscher Rundfunk (NDR)
- Country: Germany
- Selection process: Countdown Grand Prix Eurovision 2000
- Selection date: 18 February 2000

Competing entry
- Song: "Wadde hadde dudde da?"
- Artist: Stefan Raab
- Songwriters: Stefan Raab

Placement
- Final result: 5th, 96 points

Participation chronology

Germany was represented at the Eurovision Song Contest 2000 with the song "Wadde hadde dudde da?" written and performed by Stefan Raab. The German participating broadcaster on behalf of ARD, Norddeutscher Rundfunk (NDR), organised the national final Countdown Grand Prix Eurovision 2000 in order to select their entry for the contest. The national final took place on 18 February 2000 and featured eleven competing acts with the winner being selected through public televoting. "Wadde hadde dudde da?" performed by Stefan Raab was selected as the German entry for Stockholm after gaining 882,569 of the votes.

As a member of the "Big Four", Germany automatically qualified to compete in the final of the Eurovision Song Contest. Performing in position 15, Germany placed fifth out of the 24 participating countries with 96 points.

== Background ==
Prior to the 2000 Contest, ARD had participated in the Eurovision Song Contest representing Germany forty-three times since its debut in 1956. It has won the contest on one occasion: in 1982 with the song "Ein bißchen Frieden" performed by Nicole. Germany, to this point, has been noted for having appeared in the contest more than any other country; they have competed in every contest since the first edition in 1956 except for 1996 when it was eliminated in a pre-contest elimination round. In 1999, the German entry "Reise nach Jerusalem – Kudüs'e Seyahat" performed by Sürpriz placed third out of twenty-three competing songs scoring 140 points.

As part of its duties as participating broadcaster, ARD organises the selection of its entry in the Eurovision Song Contest and broadcasts the event in the country. Since 1996, ARD had delegated the participation in the contest to its member Norddeutscher Rundfunk (NDR). NDR had set up national finals with several artists to choose both the song and performer to compete at Eurovision for Germany. The broadcaster organised a multi-artist national final in cooperation to select its entry for the 2000 contest.

== Before Eurovision ==
=== Countdown Grand Prix Eurovision 2000 ===
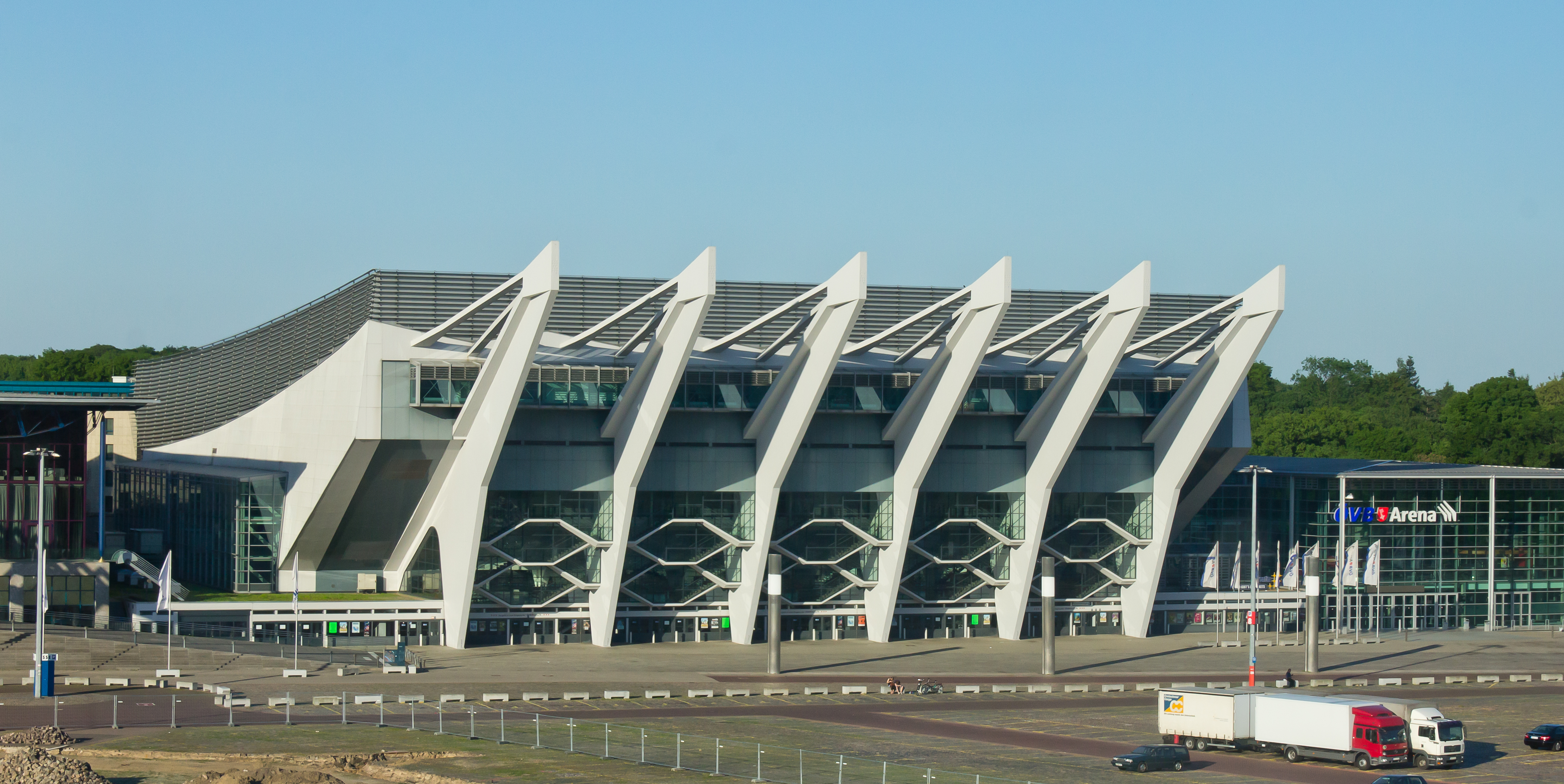
The Stadthalle in Bremen was the host venue of Countdown Grand Prix Eurovision 2000

Countdown Grand Prix Eurovision 2000 was the competition organised by NDR to select its entry in the Eurovision Song Contest 2000. The competition took place on 18 February 2000 at the Stadthalle in Bremen, hosted by Axel Bulthaupt and broadcast on Das Erste. Eleven acts competed during the show with the winner being selected through a public televote. The national final was watched by 7.87 million viewers in Germany with a market share of 24.2%.

==== Competing entries ====
11 acts were selected by a panel consisting of representatives of the German Phono Academy from proposals received from record companies and announced on 6 January 2000. Among the competing artists was Corinna May who was due to represent Germany in 1999 before being disqualified when it was discovered that her song had already been released by another singer.

Artist	Song	Songwriter(s)
Claudia Cane and Mother Bone	"Free"	Andrew Cane, Claudia Cane
Corinna May	"I Believe in God"	Ralph Siegel, Bernd Meinunger
David Kisitu	"Du mußt kein Model sein"	David Kisitu
E-Rotic	"Queen of Light"	David Brandes, Tom Fairchild
Fancy	"We Can Move a Mountain"	Charlie Glass, Hamid Varzi, Manfred Alois Segieth
Goldrausch	"Alles wird gut"	Goldrausch, Frank Ramond
Kind of Blue	"Bitter Blue"	Bernd Klimpel
Knorkator	"Ick wer zun Schwein"	Alf Ator
Lotto King Karl and Die Barmbek Dream Boys fischering ROH	"Fliegen"	Carsten Pape, Karl König
Marcel	"Adios"	Marcus Wolter
Stefan Raab	"Wadde hadde dudde da?"	Stefan Raab

==== Final ====
The televised final took place on 18 February 2000. The winner, "Wadde hadde dudde da?" performed by Stefan Raab, was selected solely through public televoting. In addition to the performances of the competing entries, the interval acts featured cover versions of songs by ABBA: the Australian group Björn Again performed "Waterloo" and "Dancing Queen", Mexican singer Filippa Giordano performed "The Winner Takes it All" and all the competing artists together performed "Thank You for the Music". 1.536 million votes were cast in the final.

Final – 18 February 2000
R/O	Artist	Song	Televote	Place
1	E-Rotic	"Queen of Light"	Unknown	6
2	Lotto King Karl and Die Barmbek Dream Boys fischering ROH	"Fliegen"	Unknown	7
3	Marcel	"Adios"	Unknown	11
4	Claudia Cane and Mother Bone	"Free"	Unknown	10
5	David Kisitu	"Du mußt kein Model sein"	Unknown	8
6	Corinna May	"I Believe in God"	216,027	2
7	Knorkator	"Ick wer zun Schwein"	108,911	4
8	Kind of Blue	"Bitter Blue"	117,044	3
9	Stefan Raab	"Wadde hadde dudde da?"	882,569	1
10	Goldrausch	"Alles wird gut"	Unknown	9
11	Fancy	"We Can Move a Mountain"	Unknown	5

== At Eurovision ==
According to Eurovision rules, the 24-country participant list for the contest was composed of: the previous year's winning country and host nation Sweden, "Big Four" countries, the thirteen countries, which had obtained the highest average points total over the preceding five contests, and any eligible countries which did not compete in the 1999 contest. As a member of the "Big Four", Germany automatically qualified to compete in the contest. During the allocation draw on 21 November 1999, Germany was drawn to perform in position 15, following the entry from Denmark and before the entry from Switzerland. Germany finished in fifth place with 96 points.

In Germany, the show was broadcast on Das Erste, with commentary by Peter Urban. The show was watched by 10.03 million viewers in Germany.

=== Voting ===
Below is a breakdown of points awarded to Germany and awarded by Germany in the contest. The nation awarded its 12 points to Denmark in the contest.

NDR appointed Axel Bulthaupt as its spokesperson to announce the top 12-point score awarded by the German televote.

Points awarded to Germany
Score	Country
12 points	Austria; Spain; Switzerland
10 points	France
8 points	Latvia; Netherlands
7 points	
6 points	Belgium; Iceland
5 points	Ireland; United Kingdom
4 points	Russia
3 points	Norway
2 points	Denmark; Finland
1 point	Croatia

Points awarded by Germany
Score	Country
12 points	Denmark
10 points	Turkey
8 points	Sweden
7 points	Latvia
6 points	Croatia
5 points	Estonia
4 points	Russia
3 points	Malta
2 points	Austria
1 point	Netherlands
