= Switzerland in the Eurovision Song Contest 2000 =

- Eurovision Song Contest 2000
- Participating broadcaster: Swiss Broadcasting Corporation (SRG SSR)
- Country: Switzerland
- Selection process: Eurosong 2000
- Selection date: 29 January 2000

Competing entry
- Song: "La vita cos'è?"
- Artist: Jane Bogaert
- Songwriters: Bernie Staub; Thomas Marin

Placement
- Final result: 20th, 14 points

Participation chronology

Switzerland was represented at the Eurovision Song Contest 2000 with the song "La vita cos'è?", written by Bernie Staub and Thomas Marin, and performed by Jane Bogaert. The Swiss participating broadcaster, the Swiss Broadcasting Corporation (SRG SSR), returned to the contest after a one-year absence following its relegation from 1999 as one of the six entrants with the least average points over the preceding five contests, and selected its entry through the national final Eurosong 2000. Six entries performed during the national final on 29 January 2000 where a combination of jury voting and public voting selected "La vita cos'è?" performed by Jane Bogaert as the winner.

Switzerland competed in the Eurovision Song Contest which took place on 13 May 2000. Performing during the show in position 16, Switzerland placed twentieth out of the 24 participating countries, scoring 14 points.

== Background ==
Prior to the 2000 Contest, the Swiss Broadcasting Corporation (SRG SSR) had participated in the Eurovision Song Contest representing Switzerland forty-two times since its first entry in 1956. It won that first edition of the contest with the song "Refrain" performed by Lys Assia. Its second victory was achieved in 1988 with the song "Ne partez pas sans moi" performed by Canadian singer Céline Dion. In 1998, it placed last failing to earn any points with the song "Lass ihn" performed by Gunvor.

As part of its duties as participating broadcaster, SRG SSR organises the selection of its entry in the Eurovision Song Contest and broadcasts the event in the country. The broadcaster has selected its entry for the contest through both national finals and internal selections in the past. Between 1994 and 1997, the Swiss entry was internally selected for the competition. In 1998, the broadcaster opted to organize a national final in order to select its entry, a selection procedure that continued for its 2000 entry.

== Before Eurovision ==
=== Eurosong 2000 ===
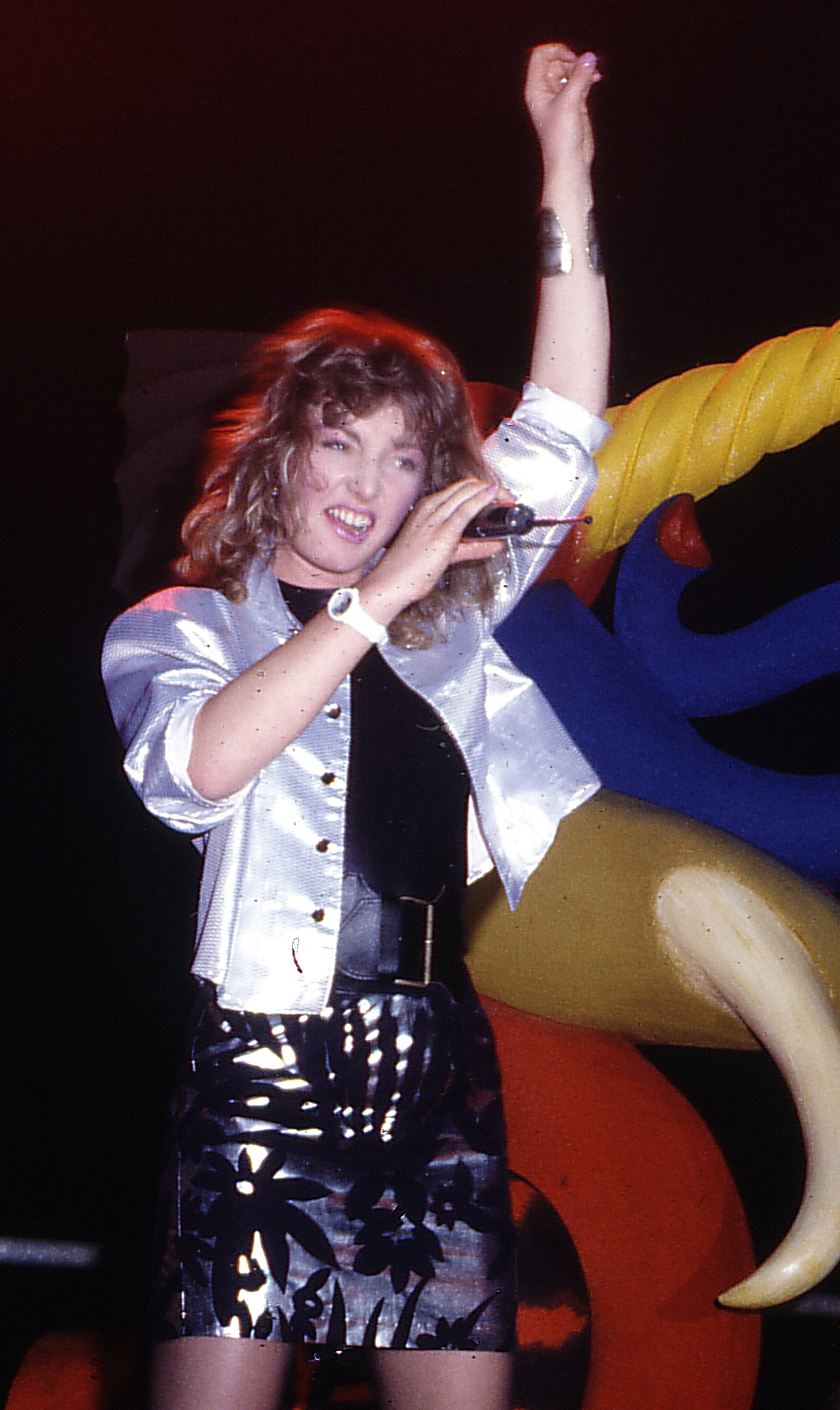
Jane Bogaert (pictured in 1987) was selected to represent Switzerland in 2000 with the song "La vita cos'è?"

The Swiss Broadcasting Corporation (SRG SSR) held a national final to select its entry for the Eurovision Song Contest 2000. Over 100 entries were submitted to the three divisions of SRG SSR — Swiss-German and Romansh broadcaster Schweizer Fernsehen der deutschen und rätoromanischen Schweiz (SF DRS), Swiss-French broadcaster Télévision suisse romande (TSR), and Swiss-Italian broadcaster Televisione Svizzera di lingua italiana (TSI) — following a submission period for interested artists and composers. Eligible songs were required to have been composed by songwriters from Switzerland.

The selection process took place in three stages before the finalists and ultimately the winner were selected. The first stage of the competition included SF DRS, TSR and TSI each evaluating the submissions they received. A total of 30 candidates were selected for the second stage, which took place in November 1999 and involved a jury panel consisting of music and media professionals selecting six artists and songs to proceed to the third stage, the televised national final, where the winning artist and song was selected to represent Switzerland in Stockholm.

TSI staged Eurosong 2000 on 29 January 2000 at 20:40 CET from the Discoteca Prince of the Lugano Casino. It was hosted by Matteo Pelli and televised on SF 2 with commentary in German by Sandra Studer, TSI 1, and TSR 1 with commentary in French by Jean-Marc Richard.

Participating entries
Artist	Song	Songwriter(s)		Language
Artist	Song	Composer	Lyricist	Language
Autseid	"Glückstränä"	Bernie Staub	Brigitte Schöb	German
Charlotte Mahoney	"Generation"	Benoît Kaufmann		French
Elisabeth White	"Thank You for the Flowers"	Leo Leoni	Elisabeth White; Leo Leoni	English
Jane Bogaert	"La vita cos'è?"	Thomas Marin	Bernie Staub; Brigitte Schöb	Italian
Lauranne	"Vous"	Bernard Jacquir		French
Nubya and Al Walser	"Just 4 You"	Al Walser		English

==== Final ====
The six candidate songs in contention to represent Switzerland were performed during the national final and the combination of two televoting regions (2/3) and the votes of an expert jury (1/3) selected "La vita cos'è?" performed by Jane Bogaert as the winner. Among the members of the jury were Jacques Huwiler (journalist TSR) and Carol Rich (who represented Switzerland in 1987). The televotes of Italian-speaking Switzerland (TSI) were not included in the final result due to a collapse of the voting lines in the region, while the jury votes as well as the televotes of German-speaking Switzerland (DRS) and French-speaking Switzerland (TSR) were wrongly presented during the show due to technical problems; the results were revised shortly after.

Final – 29 January 2000
R/O	Artist	Song	Jury	Televote		Total	Place
R/O	Artist	Song	Jury	DRS	TSR	Total	Place
1	Jane Bogaert	"La vita cos'è?"	8	4	3	15	1
2	Nubya and Al Walser	"Just 4 You"	6	6	2	14	2
3	Autseid	"Glückstränä"	2	8	1	11	3
4	Charlotte Mahoney	"Generation"	3	2	6	11	3
5	Elisabeth White	"Thank You for the Flowers"	4	3	4	11	3
6	Lauranne	"Vous"	1	1	8	10	6

== At Eurovision ==
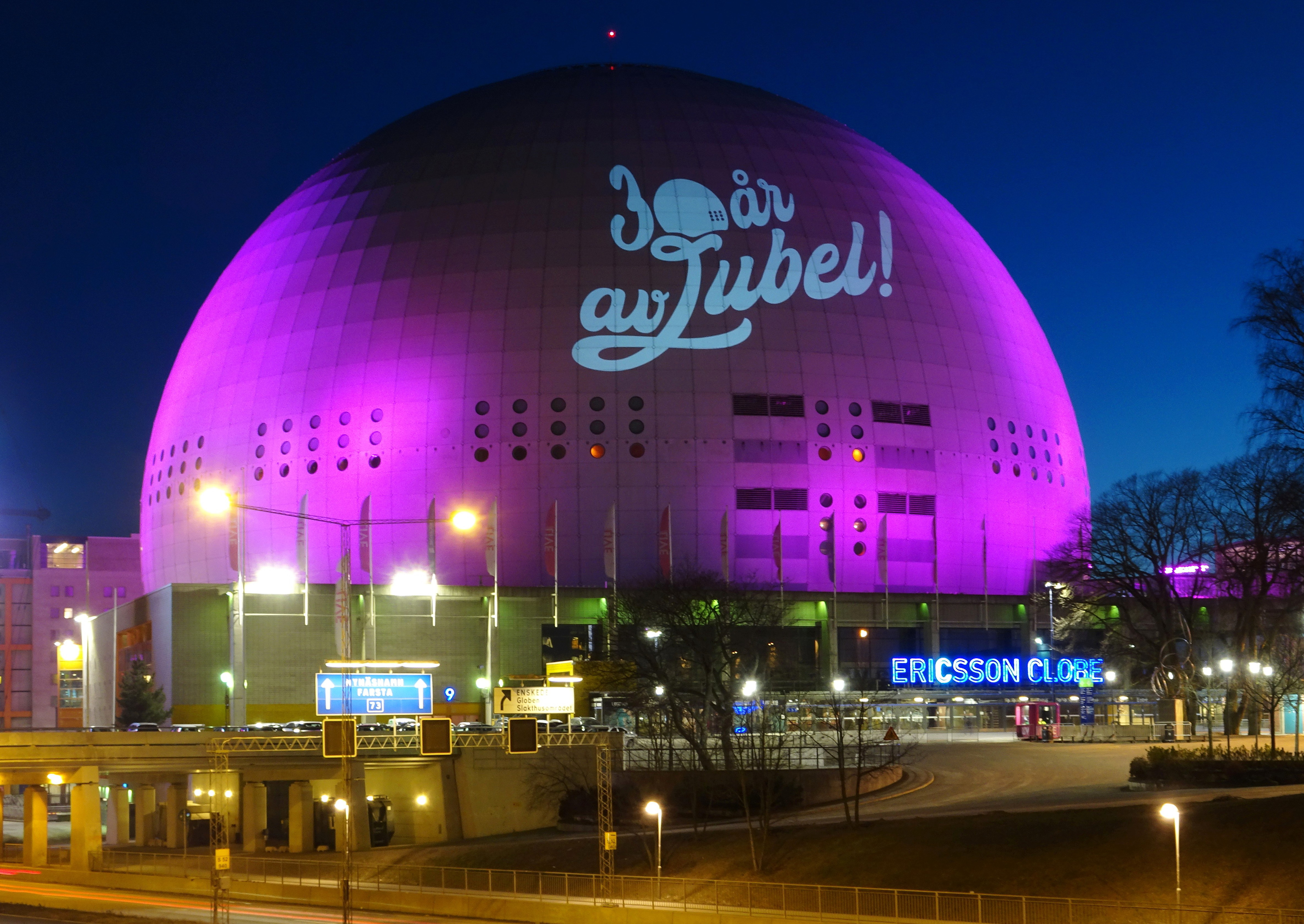
The Eurovision Song Contest 2000 took place at the Globe Arena in Stockholm, Sweden, on 13 May 2000.

According to Eurovision rules, the 24-country participant list for the contest was composed of: the previous year's winning country and host nation Sweden, "Big Four" countries, the thirteen countries, which had obtained the highest average points total over the preceding five contests, and any eligible countries which did not compete in the 1999 contest. On 21 November 1999, an allocation draw was held which determined the running order and Switzerland was set to perform in position 16, following the entry from Germany and before the entry from Croatia. Among the backing vocalists that joined Jane Bogaert on stage for her performance was Al Bano who previously represented Italy in 1976 and in 1985, as part of a duet with Romina Power on both occasions. Switzerland finished in twentieth place with 14 points.

In Switzerland, the contest was aired on the three broadcasters that form SRG SSR. Sandra Studer (who represented Switzerland in 1991) provided German commentary on SF 2, Jean-Marc Richard provided French commentary on TSR 1, while Jonathan Tedesco provided Italian commentary on TSI 1.

=== Voting ===
Below is a breakdown of points awarded to Switzerland and awarded by Switzerland in the contest. The nation awarded its 12 points to Germany in the contest.

SRG SSR appointed Astrid Von Stockar as its spokesperson to announce the results of the Swiss televote during the show.

Points awarded to Switzerland
Score	Country
12 points	
10 points	
8 points	
7 points	
6 points	Netherlands
5 points	Russia
4 points	
3 points	
2 points	Latvia
1 point	Austria

Points awarded by Switzerland
Score	Country
12 points	Germany
10 points	Denmark
8 points	Ireland
7 points	Latvia
6 points	Croatia
5 points	Turkey
4 points	Austria
3 points	Sweden
2 points	Russia
1 point	Spain
