= Estonia in the Eurovision Song Contest 2000 =

- Eurovision Song Contest 2000
- Participating broadcaster: Eesti Televisioon (ETV)
- Country: Estonia
- Selection process: Eurolaul 2000
- Selection date: 5 February 2000

Competing entry
- Song: "Once in a Lifetime"
- Artist: Ines
- Songwriters: Alar Kotkas; Ilmar Laisaar; Pearu Paulus; Jana Hallas

Placement
- Final result: 4th, 98 points

Participation chronology

Estonia was represented at the Eurovision Song Contest 2000 with the song "Once in a Lifetime", composed by Pearu Paulus, Ilmar Laisaar, and Alar Kotkas, with lyrics by Jana Hallas, and performed by Ines. The Estonian participating broadcaster, Eesti Televisioon (ETV), organised the national final Eurolaul 2000 in order to select its entry for the contest. Ten songs competed in the national final and "Once in a Lifetime" performed by Ines was selected as the winner by a jury panel.

Estonia competed in the Eurovision Song Contest which took place on 13 May 2000. Performing during the show in position 4, Estonia placed fourth out of the 24 participating countries, scoring 98 points.

== Background ==
Prior to the 2000 contest, Eesti Televisioon (ETV) had participated in the Eurovision Song Contest representing Estonia five times since its first entry in 1994. Its best result in the contest was fifth, which was achieved in 1996 with the song "Kaelakee hääl" performed by Maarja-Liis Ilus and Ivo Linna. In 1999, "Diamond of Night" performed by Evelin Samuel and Camille placed sixth.

As part of its duties as participating broadcaster, ETV organises the selection of its entry in the Eurovision Song Contest and broadcasts the event in the country. Since its debut, the broadcaster has organised national finals that feature a competition among multiple artists and songs in order to select its entry for the contest. ETV has organised the Eurolaul 2000 competition since 1996 in order to select its entry, with the broadcaster organising Eurolaul 2000 in order to select its 2000 entry.

== Before Eurovision ==
=== Eurolaul 2000 ===
Eurolaul 2000 was the seventh edition of the national selection Eurolaul organised by ETV to select its entry for the Eurovision Song Contest 2000. The competition consisted of a ten-song final on 5 February 2000 at the ETV studios in Tallinn, hosted by Marko Reikop and broadcast on ETV.

==== Competing entries ====
A 10-member jury panel selected ten finalists from 41 submissions received by ETV, and the selected songs were announced on 17 December 1999. Among the competing artists was previous Eurovision Song Contest entrant Evelin Samuel, who represented Estonia in 1999 together with Camille. Hedvig Hanson, Kate, Lauri Liiv (member of White Satin) and Siiri Sisask have all competed in previous editions of Eurolaul. The selection jury consisted of Maarja-Liis Ilus (singer), Andres Jõesaar (TV3 vice president), Priit Hõbemägi (culture critic), Antti Kammiste (musician), Tõnu Kõrvits (composer), Elektra (Kanal 2 presenter), Urmas Lattikas (composer), Ivo Linna (singer), Allan Roosileht (Raadio 2 music editor) and Raivo Sersant (music manager).

Artist	Song	Songwriter(s)
Evelin Samuel	"Over the Water Blue"	Evelin Samuel, Priit Pajusaar, Glen Pilvre
Hedvig Hanson and Mac McFall	"When We're Flying High"	Hedvig Hanson
Ines	"Kuulatan su ootamist"	Lauri Saatpalu
Ines	"Once in a Lifetime"	Jana Hallas, Pearu Paulus, Ilmar Laisaar, Alar Kotkas
Kate	"Verevend"	Villu Kangur, Aivar Joonas
Maian Kärmas	"Mõistus ja tunded"	Maian Kärmas
Maian Kärmas	"One Sweet Moment"	Maian Kärmas
Sarah and Lea	"Sunshine"	Peter Ross
Siiri Sisask	"Goodnight"	Siiri Sisask, Tomi Rahula
White Satin	"Church of Love"	Sulev Lõhmus

==== Final ====
The final took place on 5 February 2000. Ten songs competed during the show and a jury selected "Once in a Lifetime" performed by Ines as the winner. A non-competitive public televote registered 9,866 votes and also selected Ines as the winner. The jury panel that voted in the final consisted of Jernej Verne (music editor and presenter of the Slovenian radio station Val 202), Noel Kelehan (Irish conductor), Corinne Hermès (French singer), Manfred Witt (music, show and entertainment producer of the German broadcaster NDR), Anders Berglund (Swedish composer and conductor), André Vermeulen (journalist for the Belgian broadcaster VRT), Jorge de Carmo (Portuguese composer and producer), Michael Ball (British singer), Björgvin Halldórsson (Icelandic singer) and Moshe Datz (Israeli composer and singer).

Final – 5 February 2000
R/O	Artist	Song	Jury Votes										Total	Place
R/O	Artist	Song	J. Verne	N. Kelehan	C. Hermès	M. Witt	A. Berglund	A. Vermeulen	J. do Carmo	M. Ball	B. Halldórsson	M. Datz	Total	Place
1	Maian Kärmas	"Mõistus ja tunded"	4	1	12	4	10	10	10	4	6	7	68	4
2	White Satin	"Church of Love"	6	5	8	1	7	1	2	2	5	5	42	9
3	Ines	"Kuulatan su ootamist"	8	2	5	3	2	5	8	5	4	1	43	8
4	Sarah and Lea	"Sunshine"	5	6	4	7	1	2	4	1	3	3	36	10
5	Maian Kärmas	"One Sweet Moment"	3	7	10	6	3	7	7	3	7	4	57	5
6	Hedvig Hanson and Mac McFall	"When We're Flying High"	10	10	7	8	8	3	5	6	8	12	77	2
7	Siiri Sisask	"Goodnight"	2	12	3	5	4	4	3	8	2	2	45	6
8	Kate	"Verevend"	1	3	2	2	5	12	6	7	1	6	45	6
9	Ines	"Once in a Lifetime"	12	4	6	10	12	8	12	12	12	10	98	1
10	Evelin Samuel	"Over the Water Blue"	7	8	1	12	6	6	1	10	10	8	69	3

== At Eurovision ==
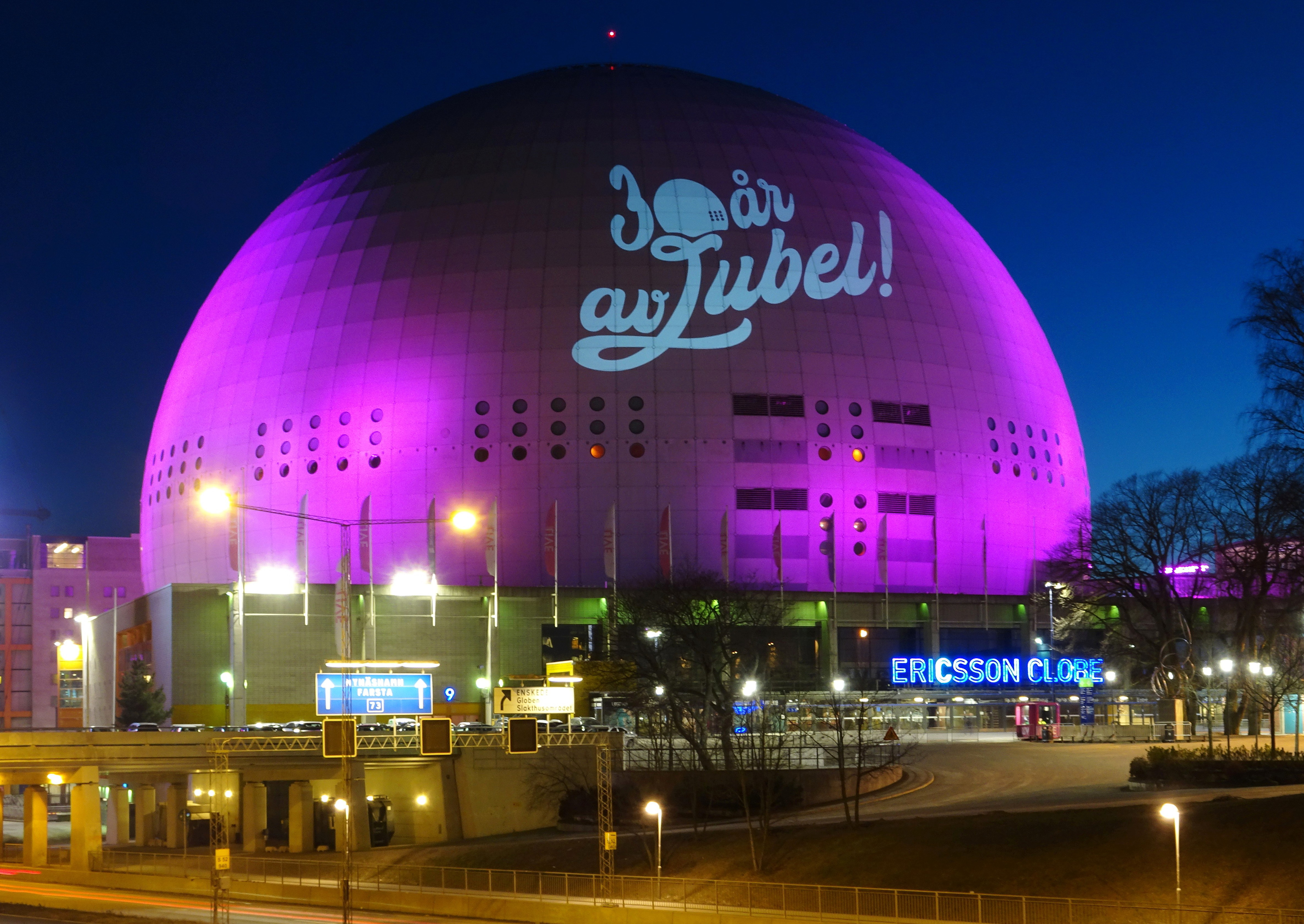
The Eurovision Song Contest 2000 took place at the Globe Arena in Stockholm, Sweden, on 13 May 2000.

The Eurovision Song Contest 2000 took place at Globe Arena in Stockholm, Sweden, on 13 May 2000. According to Eurovision rules, the participants list included the previous year's winning country, the "Big Four" countries (France, Germany, Spain, and the United Kingdom), the countries with the highest average scores between the 1995 and 1999 contests, and any countries which had not competed in the 1999 contest. On 21 November 1999, an allocation draw was held which determined the running order and Estonia was set to perform in position 4, following the entry from the United Kingdom and before the entry from France.

Ines was joined on stage by Maiken, Kaire Vilgats, Jelena Juzvik, the co-composer of "Once in a Lifetime" Pearu Paulus, and Tanel Padar, and Estonia finished in fourth place with 98 points, their highest finish up to that time. Padar would go on to represent Estonia in 2001 together with Dave Benton and 2XL, winning the contest.

The contest, which was broadcast in Estonia on ETV and via radio on Raadio 2 (both with commentary by Marko Reikop), was watched by a total of 545,000 viewers in Estonia with the market share of 46.6%. ETV appointed Evelin Samuel (who represented Estonia in 1999) as its spokesperson to announce the results of the Estonian televote during the show.

=== Voting ===
Below is a breakdown of points awarded to Estonia and awarded by Estonia to other countries in the contest. The nation awarded its 12 points to Latvia in the contest.

Points awarded to Estonia
Score	Country
12 points	
10 points	Latvia
8 points	Finland
7 points	Ireland; Malta; Netherlands
6 points	Croatia; Cyprus; Israel; Romania; Sweden
5 points	Germany; Iceland
4 points	Denmark; Norway; United Kingdom
3 points	Austria
2 points	Belgium; Turkey
1 point	

Points awarded by Estonia
Score	Country
12 points	Latvia
10 points	Russia
8 points	Denmark
7 points	Finland
6 points	Iceland
5 points	Sweden
4 points	Ireland
3 points	Norway
2 points	United Kingdom
1 point	Malta
