= United Kingdom in the Eurovision Song Contest 2000 =

- Eurovision Song Contest 2000
- Participating broadcaster: British Broadcasting Corporation (BBC)
- Country: United Kingdom
- Selection process: A Song for Europe 2000
- Selection date: 20 February 2000

Competing entry
- Song: "Don't Play That Song Again"
- Artist: Nicki French
- Songwriters: John Springate; Gerry Shephard

Placement
- Final result: 16th, 28 points

Participation chronology

The United Kingdom was represented at the Eurovision Song Contest 2000 with the song "Don't Play That Song Again", written by John Springate and Gerry Shepherd, and performed by Nicki French. The British participating broadcaster, the British Broadcasting Corporation (BBC), organised a public selection process to determine its entry for the contest, A Song for Europe 2000. Eight acts competed in the national final which consisted of a semi-final and a final, during which the winner was selected entirely through a public televote.

As a member of the "Big Four", the United Kingdom automatically qualified to compete in the final of the Eurovision Song Contest. Performing in position 3, the United Kingdom placed sixteenth out of the 24 participating countries with 28 points.

== Background ==
Prior to the 2000 contest, the British Broadcasting Corporation (BBC) had participated in the Eurovision Song Contest representing the United Kingdom forty-two times. Thus far, it has won the contest five times: in 1967 with the song "Puppet on a String" performed by Sandie Shaw, in 1969 with the song "Boom Bang-a-Bang" performed by Lulu, in 1976 with "Save Your Kisses for Me" performed by Brotherhood of Man, in 1981 with the song "Making Your Mind Up" performed by Bucks Fizz and in 1997 with the song "Love Shine a Light" performed by Katrina and the Waves. To this point, the nation is noted for having finished as the runner-up in a record fifteen contests. Up to and including 1998, it had only twice finished outside the top 10, in 1978 and in 1987. For the 1999 contest, it finished in twelfth place out of twenty-three competing entries with the song "Say It Again" performed by Precious, which was its worst result since 1987.

As part of its duties as participating broadcaster, the BBC organises the selection of its entry in the Eurovision Song Contest and broadcasts the event in the country. The broadcaster has traditionally organised a national final featuring a competition among several artists and songs to choose its entry for Eurovision. For its 2000 entry, the BBC announced that a national final involving a public vote would be held to select its entry, reverting to the historic A Song for Europe title but retaining the format from the previous selection show The Great British Song Contest (1996–99).

== Before Eurovision ==
=== A Song for Europe 2000 ===
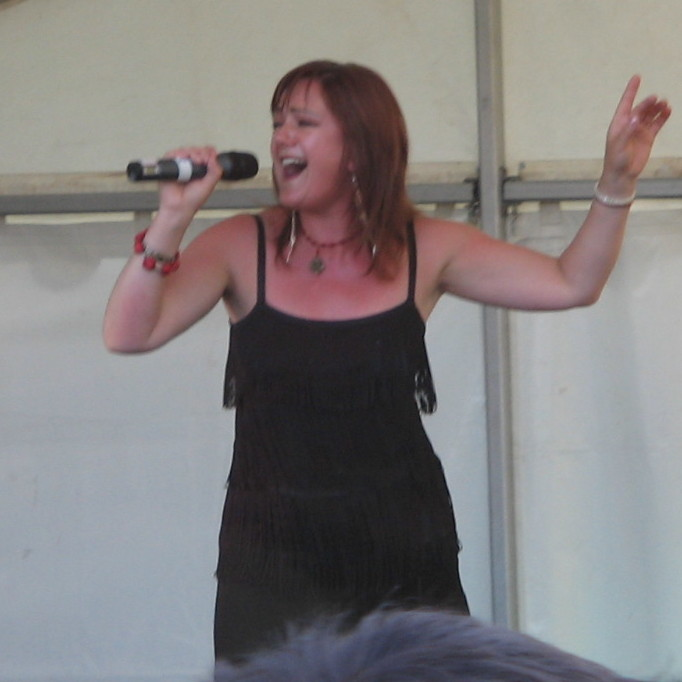
Nicki French represented the United Kingdom in 2000 after winning A Song for Europe

A Song for Europe 2000 was the national final developed by the BBC in order to select its entry for the Eurovision Song Contest 2000. Eight acts competed in the competition which consisted of a radio semi-final on 14 January 2000 and a televised final on 20 February 2000. The semi-final was broadcast on BBC Radio 2, while the final was broadcast on BBC One.

==== Competing entries ====
On 12 August 1999, BBC together with the British Academy of Songwriters, Composers and Authors (BASCA) announced an open submission for interested songwriters to submit their songs until October 1999. The 1,000 received submissions were reviewed and a 25-song shortlist was compiled (the song "Stand Up" written by Richard Silver was automatically included in the shortlist after winning the London International Song Contest which was also ran by BASCA) and presented to a professional panel headed by music producer Jonathan King that ultimately selected eight semi-finalists to compete in the national final. The eight artists were announced on 15 December 1999, while the competing songs were premiered during The Ken Bruce Show and Wake Up to Wogan on BBC Radio 2 between 10 and 13 January 2000. Before the national final, the artist Pas De Deux was renamed as India.

==== Semi-final ====
Eight acts competed in the radio semi-final which was hosted by Terry Wogan and Ken Bruce on 14 January 2000. A public televote, which registered 32,105 votes, selected the top four songs that proceeded to the final.

Contestants and results of the semi-final – 14 January 2000
R/O	Artist	Song	Songwriter(s)	Televote	Place
1	Helene Hørlyck	"Aria"	John Tonks; Helene Hørlyck	1,826	7
2	Catherine Porter	"Crazy"	Tony Moore; Catherine Porter	9,140	1
3	Nicki French	"Don't Play That Song Again"	John Springate; Gerry Shepherd	5,550	2
4	Sexy Sadie	"I Won't Let You Do This to Me"	Mike Connaris; Teri Bradley; Paul Brown	4,403	3
5	Six Chix	"Only the Women Know"	Kimberley Rew	4,115	4
6	Jayne Tretton	"Stand Up"	Richard Silver	2,182	6
7	Catherine Porter	"The Answer"	Tony Moore; Catherine Porter	1,635	8
8	India	"Wherever You Go"	Simon May; Ben Robbins	3,254	5

==== Final ====
Four acts competed in the televised final on 20 February 2000 which was held at the BBC Elstree Centre in Borehamwood, Hertfordshire and hosted by Katy Hill. A public televote selected the winner, "Don't Play That Song Again" performed by Nicki French. The televote in the final registered 129,526 votes.

Contestants and results of the final – 20 February 2000
R/O	Artist	Song	Televote	Place
1	Sexy Sadie	"I Won't Let You Do This to Me"	10,494	4
2	Catherine Porter	"Crazy"	29,348	3
3	Six Chix	"Only the Women Know"	42,329	2
4	Nicki French	"Don't Play That Song Again"	47,355	1

== At Eurovision ==
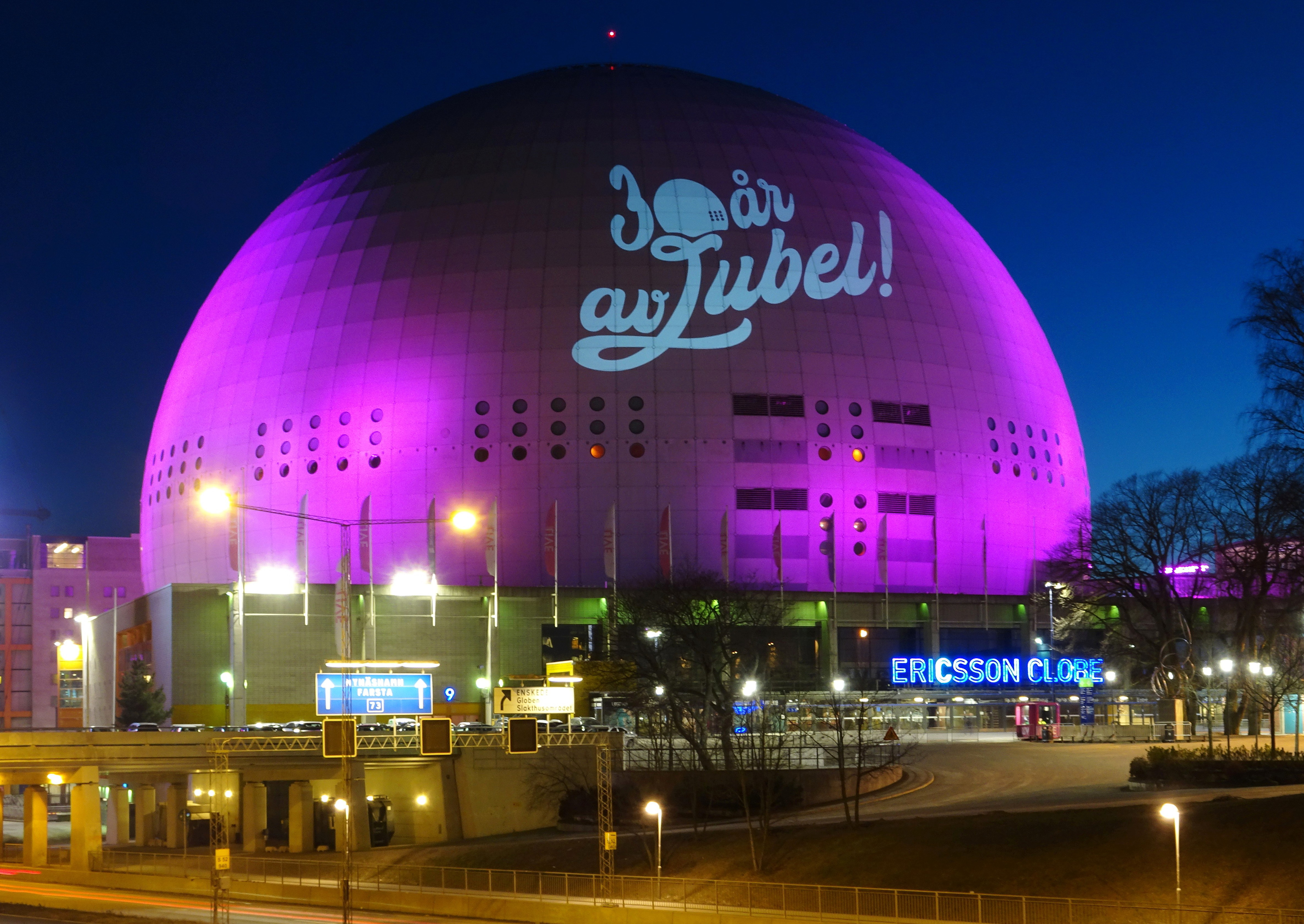
The Eurovision Song Contest 2000 took place at the Globe Arena in Stockholm, Sweden.

The Eurovision Song Contest 2000 took place at Globe Arena in Stockholm, Sweden, on 13 May 2000. According to Eurovision rules, the participants list included the previous year's winning country, the "Big Four" countries (France, Germany, Spain and the United Kingdom), the countries with the highest average scores between the 1995 and 1999 contests, and any countries which had not competed in the 1999 contest. As a member of the "Big Four", the United Kingdom automatically qualified to compete in the contest. On 21 November 1999, an allocation draw was held which determined the running order and the United Kingdom was set to perform in position 3, following the entry from the Netherlands and before the entry from Estonia. The United Kingdom finished in sixteenth place with 28 points. It was the worst performing entry of the UK up to that point, and would remain so until 2003.

In the United Kingdom, the contest was televised on BBC One and BBC Prime with commentary by Terry Wogan as well as broadcast on BBC Radio 2 with commentary by Ken Bruce.

=== Voting ===
Below is a breakdown of points awarded to the United Kingdom and awarded by the United Kingdom in the contest. Around 535,000 valid votes were registered in the UK in total during the five-minute voting window, which determined the nation's points. The United Kingdom awarded its 12 points to Denmark in the contest.

The BBC appointed Colin Berry as its spokesperson to announce the results of the British televote during the broadcast.

Points awarded to the United Kingdom
Score	Country
12 points	
10 points	
8 points	
7 points	
6 points	Malta; Turkey
5 points	
4 points	Croatia
3 points	Cyprus; Latvia; Romania
2 points	Estonia
1 point	Israel

Points awarded by the United Kingdom
Score	Country
12 points	Denmark
10 points	Ireland
8 points	Russia
7 points	Latvia
6 points	Sweden
5 points	Germany
4 points	Estonia
3 points	Norway
2 points	Malta
1 point	Austria
