= Malta in the Eurovision Song Contest 2000 =

- Eurovision Song Contest 2000
- Participating broadcaster: Public Broadcasting Services (PBS)
- Country: Malta
- Selection process: Malta Song for Europe 2000
- Selection date: 15 January 2000

Competing entry
- Song: "Desire"
- Artist: Claudette Pace
- Songwriters: Philip Vella; Gerard James Borg

Placement
- Final result: 8th, 73 points

Participation chronology

Malta was represented at the Eurovision Song Contest 2000 with the song "Desire", composed by Philip Vella, with lyrics by Gerard James Borg, and performed by Claudette Pace. The Maltese participating broadcaster, Public Broadcasting Services (PBS), selected its entry for the contest through the national final Malta Song for Europe 2000. The competition consisted of a final, held on 14 and 15 February 2000, where "Desire" performed by Claudette Pace eventually emerged as the winning entry after scoring the most points from a seven-member jury.

Malta competed in the Eurovision Song Contest which took place on 13 May 2000. Performing during the show in position 7, Malta placed eight out of the 24 participating countries, scoring 48 points.

== Background ==
Prior to the 2000 contest, the Maltese Broadcasting Authority (MBA) until 1975, and the Public Broadcasting Services (PBS) since 1991, had participated in the Eurovision Song Contest representing Malta 12 times since MBA's first entry in 1971. After competing in 1975, Malta was absent from the contest beginning in 1976. After returning in 1991, it had competed annually. By 2001, its best placing was third and this was achieved on two occasions: in 1992 with the song "Little Child" performed by Mary Spiteri and in 1998 with the song "The One That I Love" performed by Chiara.

As part of its duties as participating broadcaster, PBS organises the selection of its entry in the Eurovision Song Contest and broadcasts the event in the country. The broadcaster had selected its entry consistently through a national final procedure, a method that was continued for its 2000 participation.

== Before Eurovision ==
=== Malta Song for Europe 2000 ===
Malta Song for Europe 2000 was the national final format developed by PBS to select its entry for the Eurovision Song Contest 2000. 224 entries were received by the broadcaster for the competition after artists and composers were able to submit their entries, and sixteen songs were selected to compete and announced on 11 December 1999 at a press conference held at the Corinthia St. George's Hotel in St. Julian's. One of the selected songs, "(You Will Always Be) Deep Inside My Heart" written by Paul Zammit Cutajar, was withdrawn and replaced with "The Only One" performed by former Maltese Eurovision entrant Paul Giordimaina who represented Malta in 1991.

The final took place on 14 and 15 January 2000 at the Mediterranean Conference Centre in the nation's capital city of Valletta, hosted by Stephanie Farrugia, Miriam Dalli and Charles Saliba and broadcast on Television Malta (TVM) as well as on Super One Radio and its website super1.com. Sixteen entries competed and the votes from a seven-member jury panel, among its members which included eight-time Eurovision conductor for the United Kingdom Ronnie Hazlehurst as well as Serhat, who represented San Marino in 2016 and in 2019, determined the winner. A non-competitive public televote was also held which Claudette Pace won, with Fabrizio Faniello in second place and Alwyn Borg Myatt third. The interval act of the show on 14 January, alternatively entitled Marru L-Ewropa, featured guest performances by former Maltese Eurovision entrants, while the interval act of the show on 2 February featured performances by Eurovision winner Johnny Logan (1980 and 1987). After the votes from the jury panel were combined, "Desire" performed by Claudette Pace was the winner.

Final – 14–15 January 2000
R/O	Artist	Song	Songwriter(s)	Points	Place
1	Konrad Pule'	"Going Strong"	J.P. Cassaletto, Konrad Pule'	51	11
2	Alwyn Borg Myatt	"Let's Try Love Once More"	Philip Vella	67	7
3	Olivia Lewis	"I Wanna Love You"	Doris Chetcuti, Eugenio Schembri	59	9
4	Paula	"One Day"	Paul Zammit Cutajar, Ronnie Busuttil	39	14
5	Marvic Lewis	"I Have Given All To You"	Doris Chetcuti, Eugenio Schembri	57	10
6	Gianni	"My Friends"	Paul Zammit Cutajar, Gianni Zammit	40	13
7	Tarcisio Barbara	"Home-Grown Tenderness"	Alfred C. Sant, Philip Vella	45	12
8	Claudette Pace	"Desire"	Philip Vella, Gerard James Borg	122	1
9	Rita Pace	"Come Into My Life"	Rita Pace	16	16
10	Ira Losco	"Shine"	Philip Vella, Gerard James Borg	70	6
11	Rita Pace	"We Can Touch the Wind"	Rita Pace	33	15
12	Olivia Lewis	"Only for You"	Doris Chetcuti, Eugenio Schembri	74	5
13	Priscilla	"Our Love"	Cynthia Sammut, Alfred Zammit	93	3
14	Fabrizio Faniello	"Change of Heart"	Georgina Abela, Paul Abela	104	2
15	Ira Losco	"Falling in Love"	Ray Agius	67	7
16	Paul Giordimaina	"The Only One"	Paul Giordimaina, Fleur Balzan	82	4

Detailed Jury Votes
R/O	Song	Juror							Total
R/O	Song	1	2	3	4	5	6	7	Total
1	"Going Strong"	12	4	4	9	9	6	7	51
2	"Let's Try Love Once More"	18	9	8	3	10	5	14	67
3	"I Wanna Love You"	7	8	12	14	11	4	3	59
4	"One Day"	6	7	2	8	8	2	6	39
5	"I Have Given All to You"	14	6	11	6	7	3	10	57
6	"My Friends"	4	3	5	7	3	14	4	40
7	"Home-Grown Tenderness"	8	2	9	5	1	12	8	45
8	"Desire"	20	20	20	4	20	20	18	122
9	"Come Into My Life"	2	1	1	1	5	1	5	16
10	"Shine"	11	16	10	12	2	18	1	70
11	"We Can Touch the Wind"	1	5	3	10	4	8	2	33
12	"Only for You"	16	11	6	11	14	7	9	74
13	"Our Love"	5	10	14	18	16	10	20	93
14	"Change of Heart"	9	18	18	20	12	16	11	104
15	"Falling in Love"	3	12	7	16	6	11	12	67
16	"The Only One"	10	14	16	2	18	9	16	82

== At Eurovision ==
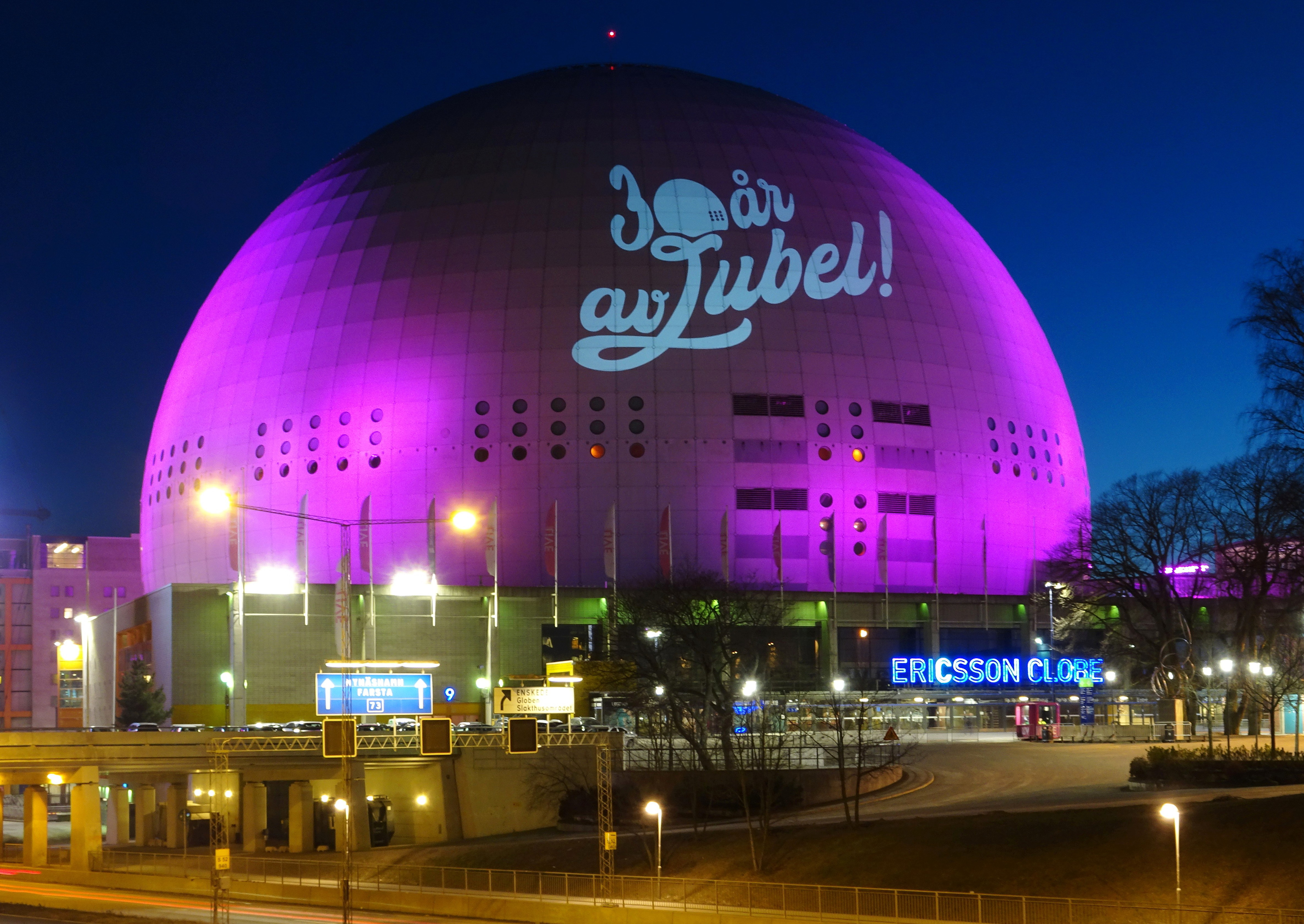
The Eurovision Song Contest 2000 took place at the Globe Arena in Stockholm, Sweden, on 13 May 2000.

The Eurovision Song Contest 2000 took place at Globe Arena in Stockholm, Sweden, on 13 May 2000. According to Eurovision rules, the participants list included the previous year's winning country, the "Big Four" countries (France, Germany, Spain and the United Kingdom), the countries with the highest average scores between the 1995 and 1999 contests, and any countries which had not competed in the 1999 contest. On 21 November 1999, an allocation draw was held which determined the running order and Malta was set to perform in position 7, following the entry from Romania and before the entry from Norway. Malta finished in eighth place with 73 points.

The show was broadcast in Malta on TVM.

=== Voting ===
Below is a breakdown of points awarded to Malta and awarded by Malta in the contest. The nation awarded its 12 points to Russia in the contest.

PBS appointed Valerie Vella as its spokesperson to announce the results of the Maltese televote during the final.

Points awarded to Malta
Score	Country
12 points	
10 points	
8 points	Croatia; Cyprus; Macedonia; Russia
7 points	Romania
6 points	
5 points	Turkey
4 points	Latvia
3 points	Denmark; Germany; Ireland; Israel; Sweden
2 points	Austria; Norway; United Kingdom
1 point	Belgium; Estonia; Netherlands; Spain

Points awarded by Malta
Score	Country
12 points	Russia
10 points	Ireland
8 points	Denmark
7 points	Estonia
6 points	United Kingdom
5 points	Netherlands
4 points	Sweden
3 points	Norway
2 points	Austria
1 point	Cyprus
