= Spain in the Eurovision Song Contest 2000 =

- Eurovision Song Contest 2000
- Participating broadcaster: Televisión Española (TVE)
- Country: Spain
- Selection process: Eurocanción 2000
- Selection date: 8 February 2000

Competing entry
- Song: "Colgado de un sueño"
- Artist: Serafín Zubiri
- Songwriter: José María Purón

Placement
- Final result: 18th, 18 points

Participation chronology

Spain was represented at the Eurovision Song Contest 2000 with the song "Colgado de un sueño" written by José María Purón and performed by Serafín Zubiri. The Spanish participating broadcaster, Televisión Española (TVE), organised the national final Eurocanción 2000 in order to select its entry for the contest. Fifteen artists and songs competed in the televised show where 17 regional juries and a public televote selected "Colgado de un sueño" performed by Serafín Zubiri as the winner. Zubiri had already represented Spain in 1992.

As a member of the "Big Four", Spain automatically qualified to compete in the Eurovision Song Contest. Performing in position 13, it placed eighteenth out of the 24 participating countries with 18 points.

== Background ==
Prior to the 2000 contest, Televisión Española (TVE) had participated in the Eurovision Song Contest representing Spain thirty-nine times since its first entry in 1961. It has won the contest on two occasions: in 1968 with the song "La, la, la" performed by Massiel and in 1969 with the song "Vivo cantando" performed by Salomé, the latter having won in a four-way tie with France, the Netherlands, and the United Kingdom. It has also finished second four times, with "En un mundo nuevo" by Karina in 1971, "Eres tú" by Mocedades in 1973, "Su canción" by Betty Missiego in 1979, and "Vuelve conmigo" by Anabel Conde in 1995. In 1999, it placed twenty-third and last with the song "No quiero escuchar" performed by Lydia.

As part of its duties as participating broadcaster, TVE organises the selection of its entry in the Eurovision Song Contest and broadcasts the event in the country. TVE selected in 1999 both the artist and song that would compete at the Eurovision Song Contest via an internal selection. For its 2000 entry, the broadcaster announced in October 1999 that for the first time in 24 years it would organise a national final featuring a competition among several artists and songs.

== Before Eurovision ==
=== Eurocanción 2000 ===
Eurocanción 2000 was the national final organised by TVE that took place on 8 February 2000 at the Estudios Buñuel in Madrid, hosted by Carlos Lozano and Paloma Lago. The show was broadcast on La Primera and TVE Internacional. Fifteen artists and songs competed with the winner being decided upon through a combination of public televoting and regional juries.

==== Competing entries ====
A submission period was open from October 1999 until January 2000. At the conclusion of the submission period, more than 200 entries were received. A six-member committee, which included the director of Eurocanción Antonio Guerrero and music director of TVE Miguel María Delgado, evaluated the entries received and selected fifteen entries for the national final. The fifteen competing acts were announced during a press conference on 6 February 2000. Among the competing artists were former Eurovision Song Contest entrants Serafín Zubiri, who represented Spain in 1992, and Anabel Conde, who represented Spain in 1995.

Artist	Song	Songwriter(s)
20 Años de Cuna	"El reloj"	Fernando Calleja; Raquel Justicia
Aguadulce	"Buscaré"	J. M. Alvarez; J. César Odro; Fernando Portillo
Alazán	"Alcanzarás la luna"	José Antonio Granados
Alto Rango	"Sin fronteras"	Faustino Gómez; Rosa Berna
Anabel Conde and David Domínguez	"Ni colores ni fronteras"	David Domínguez
Ángel Caramé	"Suave"	Alberto Manuel Guzmán; Rafael Pastor; Pedro Morales
Dulce	"Dónde estabas"	Dulce Hernández
Manuel Bravo	"Muy mujer"	Manuel Bravo
Myriam Fultz	"Gotas de algodón"	Oscar Gómez
Olga Domínguez	"Si te vas"	Luis Villa
Raúl	"Sueño su boca"	José Ogara; Josep Llobell
Serafín Zubiri	"Colgado de un sueño"	José María Purón
Sito Abalos	"Bailando en la oscuridad"	S. Templa
Sur S.A.	"Mala racha"	José Taboada; Javier García; Javier Laguna; Antonio Mellado
Yago	"No quiero"	Manolo Morvizón; Luis Baras; L. Roldán; Voss

==== Final ====
The televised final took place on 8 February 2000. In addition to the performances of the competing entries, guest performers included Presuntos Implicados, Los Panchos and Jean-Michel Jarre. The winner, "Colgado de un sueño", written by José María Purón, and performed by Serafín Zubiri, was selected through the combination of the votes of 17 regional juries (70%) and a public televote (30%).

Final – 8 February 2000
R/O	Artist	Song	Jury	Televote	Total	Place
1	Raúl	"Sueño su boca"	112	40	152	2
2	Anabel Conde and David Domínguez	"Ni colores ni fronteras"	83	0	83	4
3	Alto Rango	"Sin fronteras"	75	0	75	6
4	Ángel Caramé	"Suave"	45	0	45	11
5	Alazán	"Alcanzarás la luna"	76	0	76	5
6	Yago	"No quiero"	103	30	133	3
7	Olga Domínguez	"Si te vas"	49	0	49	10
8	Aguadulce	"Buscaré"	20	0	20	14
9	Serafín Zubiri	"Colgado de un sueño"	155	50	205	1
10	20 Años de Cuna	"El reloj"	23	0	23	12
11	Manuel Bravo	"Muy mujer"	3	0	3	15
12	Sur S.A.	"Mala racha"	22	0	22	13
13	Myriam Fultz	"Gotas de algodón"	58	0	58	8
14	Sito Abalos	"Bailando en la oscuridad"	52	0	52	9
15	Dulce	"Dónde estabas"	59	0	59	7

Detailed Regional Jury Votes
R/O	Song	Andalusia	Aragon	Asturias	Balearic Islands	Canary Islands	Cantabria	Castilla–La Mancha	Castile and León	Catalonia	Extremadura	Galicia	Madrid	Murcia	Navarre	Basque Country	La Rioja	Valencia	Total
1	"Sueño su boca"	3	7	3	8	6	8	5	8	9	6		10	9	5	10	7	8	112
2	"Ni colores ni fronteras"	7	2	6	9			7	6	6	8	1	7		6	7	4	7	83
3	"Sin fronteras"	8	6	9	1		7		4	2	9	7	1	8	2	5		6	75
4	"Suave"			7	3	5		3	5			8	2	3		4		5	45
5	"Alcanzarás la luna"	9	8	1	6	8	5	4	1	8		6		6	4	2	8		76
6	"No quiero"	4	9	5		10	9		9	10	2	10	4	4	8		10	9	103
7	"Si te vas"	5					6	6	7	5			6	7	7				49
8	"Buscaré"	2	4		5	1	3			3					1		1		20
9	"Colgado de un sueño"	10	10	10	10	9	10	10	10	7	10	4	8	10	10	8	9	10	155
10	"El reloj"	1	1			3		1	2				9			3		3	23
11	"Muy mujer"										1							2	3
12	"Mala racha"			8							4	3		2			5		22
13	"Gotas de algodón"				7	4	1	8		1	7	2	3	1	9	9	6		58
14	"Bailando en la oscuridad"		5	4	4	2	4	9		4	5	5				6	3	1	52
15	"Dónde estabas"	6	3	2	2	7	2	2	3		3	9	5	5	3	1	2	4	59

== At Eurovision ==
According to Eurovision rules, the 24-country participant list for the contest was composed of: the previous year's winning country and host nation Sweden, "Big Four" countries, the thirteen countries, which had obtained the highest average points total over the preceding five contests, and any eligible countries which did not compete in the 1999 contest. As a member of the "Big Four", Spain automatically qualified to compete in the contest. On 21 November 1999, an allocation draw was held which determined the running order and Spain was set to perform in position 12, following the entry from Iceland and before the entry from Denmark. Spain finished in eighteenth place with 18 points.

TVE broadcast the show on La Primera with commentary by José Luis Uribarri. The broadcast of the contest was watched by 4.056 million viewers in Spain with a market share of 34.8%.

=== Voting ===
Below is a breakdown of points awarded to Spain and awarded by Spain in the contest. The nation awarded its 12 points to Germany in the contest.

TVE appointed Hugo de Campos to announce the results of the Spanish televote during the final.

Points awarded to Spain
Score	Country
12 points	
10 points	Cyprus
8 points	
7 points	
6 points	
5 points	Romania
4 points	
3 points	
2 points	Russia
1 point	Switzerland

Points awarded by Spain
Score	Country
12 points	Germany
10 points	Denmark
8 points	Austria
7 points	Latvia
6 points	Sweden
5 points	Russia
4 points	Netherlands
3 points	Ireland
2 points	Croatia
1 point	Malta
