= Ireland in the Eurovision Song Contest 2000 =

- Eurovision Song Contest 2000
- Participating broadcaster: Radio Telefís Éireann (RTÉ)
- Country: Ireland
- Selection process: Eurosong 2000
- Selection date: 20 February 2000

Competing entry
- Song: "Millennium of Love"
- Artist: Eamonn Toal
- Songwriters: Gerry Simpson; Raymond J. Smyth

Placement
- Final result: 6th, 92 points

Participation chronology

Ireland was represented at the Eurovision Song Contest 2000 with the song "Millennium of Love", composed by Gerry Simpson, with lyrics by Raymond J. Smyth, and performed by Eamonn Toal. The Irish participating broadcaster, Radio Telefís Éireann (RTÉ), selected its entry through a national final.

== Before Eurovision ==
=== Eurosong 2000 ===
Eurosong 2000 was the national final format developed by Radio Telefís Éireann (RTÉ) in order to select its entry for the Eurovision Song Contest 2000. The competition was held at the RTÉ Television Centre in Dublin on 20 February 2000, hosted by Mary Kennedy who previously presented the Eurovision Song Contest 1995. Eight artists and songs were selected to compete and regional televoting determined the winner. After the combination of votes, "Millennium of Love" performed by Eamonn Toal was selected as the winner.

Final – 20 February 2000
R/O	Artist	Song	Songwriter(s)	Points	Place
1	Eamonn Toal	"Millennium of Love"	Gerry Simpson, Raymond J. Smyth	76	1
2	Karl Power	"Why Did You Have to Go?"	Andy Jack	30	8
3	Liz Fletcher	"All in a Lifetime"	Liz Fletcher	48	4
4	Shimma	"When You Are Near"	Orla Keegan	55	3
5	Lisa Stanley	"Shine"	Lisa Stanley	34	6
6	Gavin McCormack	"Journey to the Centre of Your Heart"	Barry Grace, Gavin McCormack	31	7
7	Audrey Lynch	"Feel Good Emotion"	Audrey Lynch	47	5
8	John Hurley	"Crossroads"	John Ryan, John Hurley	64	2

Detailed Regional Televoting Results
R/O	Song	Dialling codes							Total
R/O	Song	05	02	06	09	07	04	01	Total
R/O	Song	Waterford	Cork	Limerick	Galway	Sligo	Dundalk	Dublin	Total
1	"Millennium of Love"	12	10	10	10	10	12	12	76
2	"Why Did You Have to Go?"	4	5	5	4	3	3	6	30
3	"All in a Lifetime"	6	6	6	12	6	7	5	48
4	"When You Are Near"	8	7	8	7	7	10	8	55
5	"Shine"	3	3	3	5	12	5	3	34
6	"Journey to the Centre of Your Heart"	5	4	4	3	4	4	7	31
7	"Feel Good Emotion"	7	12	7	6	5	6	4	47
8	"Crossroads"	10	8	12	8	8	8	10	64

== At Eurovision ==
Toal performed 23rd in the running order on the evening of the contest, following Turkey and preceding Austria. At the close of voting, "Millennium of Love" received 92 points, finishing 6th out of 24 countries. The Irish televoting awarded its 12 points to the contest winners Denmark.

=== Voting ===
Points awarded to Ireland
Score	Country
12 points	
10 points	Malta; United Kingdom
8 points	Switzerland
7 points	Cyprus; Turkey
6 points	Norway
5 points	Croatia; Denmark
4 points	Austria; Belgium; Estonia; France; Sweden
3 points	Netherlands; Spain
2 points	Iceland; Israel; Romania
1 point	Finland; Latvia

Points awarded by Ireland
Score	Country
12 points	Denmark
10 points	Russia
8 points	Latvia
7 points	Estonia
6 points	Sweden
5 points	Germany
4 points	Norway
3 points	Malta
2 points	Austria
1 point	Netherlands
