= France in the Eurovision Song Contest 2000 =

- Eurovision Song Contest 2000
- Participating broadcaster: France Télévision
- Country: France
- Selection process: Eurovision 2000: la sélection
- Selection date: 15 February 2000

Competing entry
- Song: "On aura le ciel"
- Artist: Sofia Mestari
- Songwriters: Benoît Heinrich; Pierre Legay

Placement
- Final result: 23rd, 5 points

Participation chronology

France was represented at the Eurovision Song Contest 2000 with the song "On aura le ciel", composed by Benoît Heinrich, with lyrics by Pierre Legay, and performed by Sofia Mestari. The French participating broadcaster, France Télévision, organised the national final Eurovision 2000: la sélection in order to select its entry for the contest. Fourteen songs competed in the national final on 15 February 2000 where "On aura le ciel" performed by Sofia Mestari was selected as the winner following the combination of votes from a jury panel and a public vote.

As a member of the "Big Four", France automatically qualified to compete in the Eurovision Song Contest. Performing during the show in position 5, France placed twenty-third out of the 24 participating countries with 5 points.

== Background ==
Prior to the 2000 contest, France Télévision and its predecessor national broadcasters, had participated in the Eurovision Song Contest representing France forty-two times since RTF's debut in 1956. They first won the contest in 1958 with "Dors, mon amour" performed by André Claveau. In the 1960s, they won three times, with "Tom Pillibi" performed by Jacqueline Boyer in 1960, "Un premier amour" performed by Isabelle Aubret in 1962, and "Un jour, un enfant" performed by Frida Boccara, who won in 1969 in a four-way tie with the Netherlands, Spain, and the United Kingdom. Their fifth – and so far latest – victory came in 1977 with "L'oiseau et l'enfant" performed by Marie Myriam. They have also finished second four times, with "La Belle Amour" by Paule Desjardins in 1957, "Un, deux, trois" by Catherine Ferry in 1976, "White and Black Blues" by Joëlle Ursull in 1990, and "C'est le dernier qui a parlé qui a raison" by Amina in 1991, who lost out to Sweden's "Fångad av en stormvind" by Carola in a tie-break. In 1999, they finished in nineteenth place with the song "Je veux donner ma voix" performed by Nayah.

As part of its duties as participating broadcaster, France Télévision organised the selection of its entry in the Eurovision Song Contest and broadcast the event in the country. For 2000, the broadcaster opted to delegate the selection of its entry to France 3. The French broadcasters had used both national finals and internal selection to choose their entries in the past. From 1988 to 1998, the broadcaster opted to internally select its entry. The 1999 entry was selected via a national final that featured twelve competing acts. In 2000, they opted to organise a national final under a similar format.

== Before Eurovision ==
=== Eurovision 2000: la sélection ===
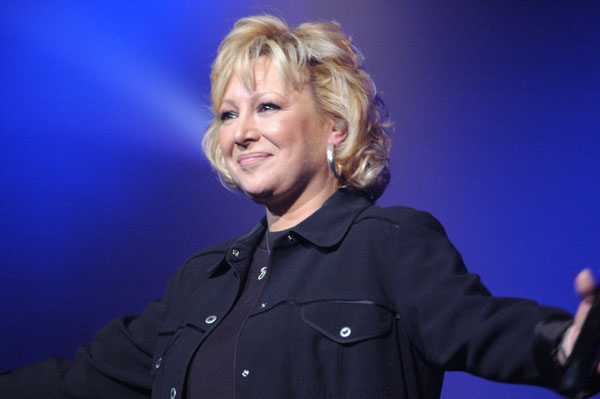
The jury panel of the national final included Marie Myriam who won the 1977 contest for France

France 3 organised the national final Eurovision 2000: la sélection to its entry for the Eurovision Song Contest 2000. The broadcaster received 450 submissions from record companies for the competition and a two-member selection committee consisting of Nathalie André (producer) and Catherine Régnier (M6 music programmer) shortlisted several entries from the received submissions as well as from entries submitted for the French 1999 national final. Auditions took place at the Headquarters of France 3 in Paris where André, Régnier and French Eurovision Head of Delegation Fabrice Ferment selected 20 entries for the next stage, which took place on 6 January 2000 and involved an alternate committee consisting of representatives of France 3 that finalised the 14 entries to compete in the national final.

Fourteen entries competed in the national final which consisted of a live final that took place on 15 February 2000 at the L'Olympia in Paris, hosted by Julien Lepers and Karen Cheryl and broadcast on France 3. In addition to the performances of the competing entries, Patrick Fiori who represented France in 1993 performed the song "Terra Umana" as the interval act of the show. The winner was determined by the combination of public voting via telephone and Minitel (50%) and a ten-member jury panel (50%). The public vote was won by Jessica Ferley with 27,000 votes out of the 43,000 registered, but she only managed to finish second as she was ranked fourth by the jury vote, which Mestari (ranked second by the televote) won. The national final was watched by 5 million viewers in France with a market share of 23.6%.

The jury panel consisted of:

- Patrick Fiori (jury president) – singer, represented France in 1993
- Patricia Coquatrix – artistic director of L'Olympia
- Lynda Lacoste – music presenter
- Loïs Andréa – singer-songwriter
- Jean Réveillon – director of France 3
- Marie Myriam – singer, won Eurovision for France in 1977
- Thierry Beccaro – actor and television presenter
- Gérard Presgurvic – composer
- Fabrice Aboulker – composer
- Didier Varrod – music programmer

Eurovision 2000: la sélection – 15 February 2000
R/O	Artist	Song	Songwriter(s)	Place
1	Jenny Zana	"Tendresses"	Jean-Michel Soupraya	—
2	Stéphane Godsend	"Nous deux"	Stéphane Godsend, M. Arraya, E. Reverdi	—
3	Ebony	"L'amour en noir et blanc"	Thierry Gronfier, Chantal Péraldi	—
4	Christophe Sarti	"C'est une très belle histoire d'amour"	Jean-Max Rivière	—
5	ZH	"Tu en fais trop"	Serge Pellerin	—
6	Sofia Mestari	"On aura le ciel"	Benoît Heinrich, Pierre Legay	1
7	Orijin	"Autour de toi"	Renaud Bidjeck, Thierry Bidjeck	3
8	Gildas Thomas	"Pense à moi"	Gildas Thomas	—
9	Hologramme	"Avec des gants"	Pascal Mounet, Félix Nicklabon, Peter von Poehl	—
10	Aïden Aleksander	"Maintenant"	Aïden Aleksander, Lionel Florence	—
11	Jessica Ferley	"Espoir"	Frédéric Bêchecloux	2
12	Guillaume Eyango	"Libérez"	Guillaume Eyango, Benjamin Farley	—
13	Mademoiselle	"SOS"	Thierry Gronfier, Chantal Péraldi	—
14	Soundkaïl	"Jeunes solidaires"	David Selise, Sacha Stouri	—

== At Eurovision ==
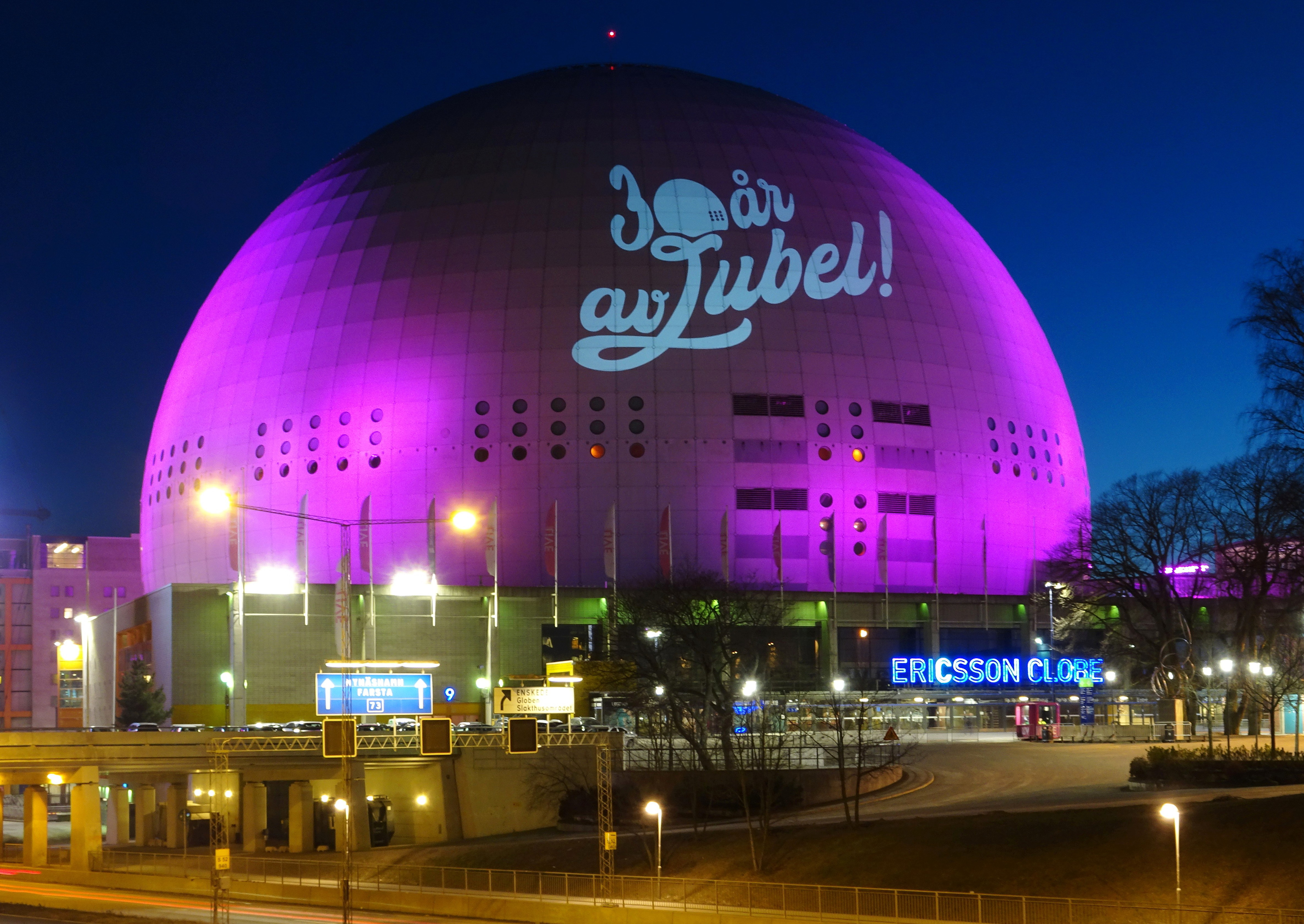
The Eurovision Song Contest 2000 took place at the Globe Arena in Stockholm, Sweden, on 13 May 2000.

According to Eurovision rules, the 24-country participant list for the contest was composed of: the previous year's winning country and host nation Sweden, "Big Four" countries, the thirteen countries, which had obtained the highest average points total over the preceding five contests, and any eligible countries which did not compete in the 1999 contest. As a member of the "Big Four", France automatically qualified to compete in the contest. On 21 November 1999, an allocation draw was held which determined the running order and France was set to perform in position 5, following the entry from Estonia and before the entry from Romania. France finished in twenty-third place with 5 points.

In France, the contest was broadcast on France 3 as well as on delay via TV5 with commentary by Julien Lepers.

=== Voting ===
Below is a breakdown of points awarded to France and awarded by France in the contest. The country awarded its 12 points to Turkey in the contest.

France Télévision appointed Marie Myriam, who won the contest for France in 1977, as its spokesperson to announce the French votes during the show.

Points awarded to France
Score	Country
12 points	
10 points	
8 points	
7 points	
6 points	
5 points	
4 points	
3 points	Russia
2 points	Netherlands
1 point	

Points awarded by France
Score	Country
12 points	Turkey
10 points	Germany
8 points	Croatia
7 points	Denmark
6 points	Israel
5 points	Russia
4 points	Ireland
3 points	Latvia
2 points	Netherlands
1 point	Sweden
