= Maria Grachvogel =

British fashion designer (born 1969)

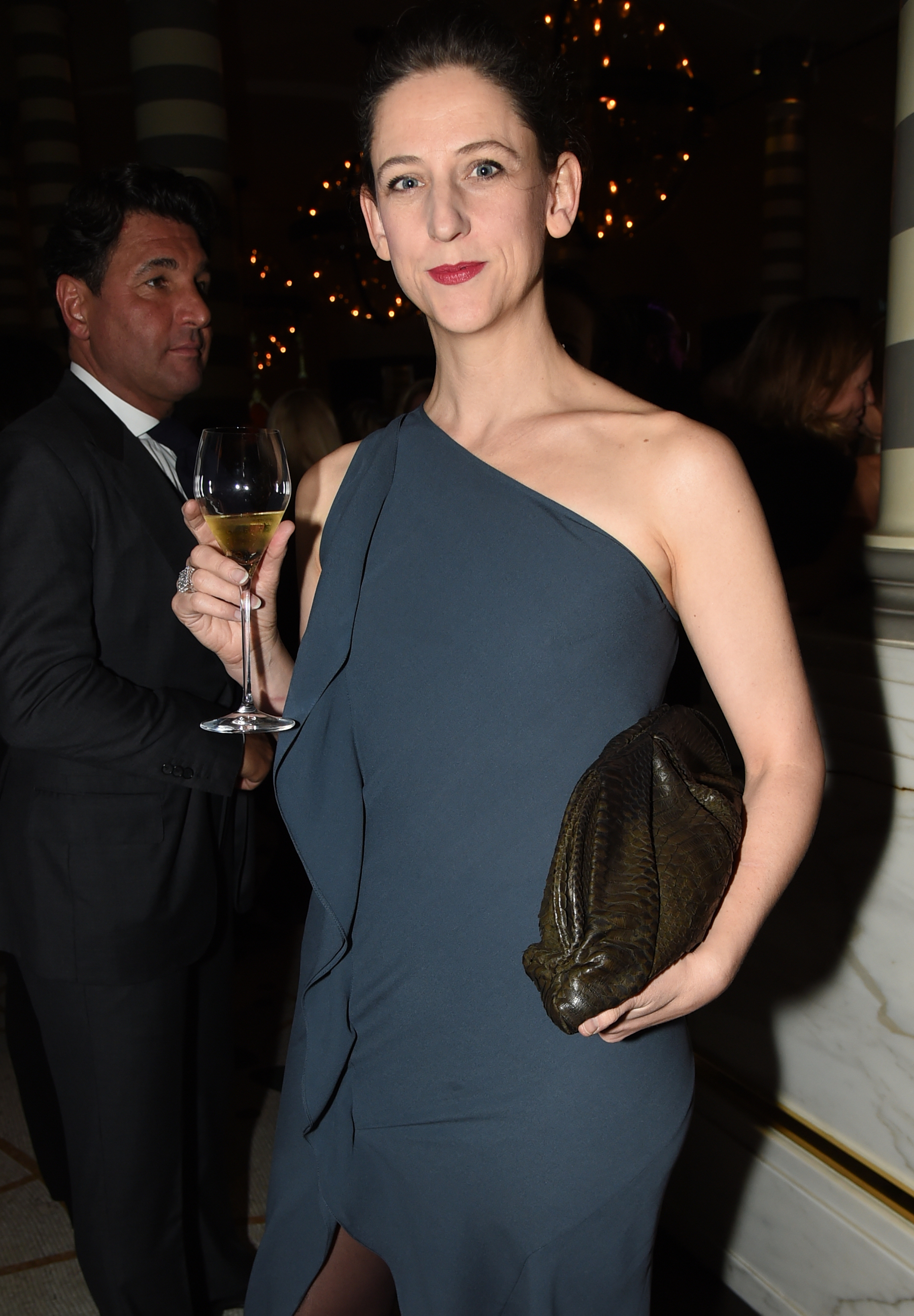
- Maria Grachvogel in November 2014
- Born: 11 July 1969 (age 56); London
- Occupation: Fashion designer
- Spouse: Mike Simcock
- Children: Son, (Ansel Grachvogel-Simcock) born 2010
- Website: www.mariagrachvogel.com

Maria Grachvogel (born 11 July 1969) is a British fashion designer. Grachvogel designs under her own label, has a store in London and regularly stages shows at London Fashion Week. Her clients have included Emma Thompson, Scarlett Johansson, Angelina Jolie, and Victoria Beckham, who has modelled for her at London Fashion Week.

== Early life and career ==
Maria Grachvogel was born in London to a Polish father and Irish mother. She was a keen designer as a teenager, creating her first collection at the age of 14. On leaving school she initially pursued a career in the City to raise capital to start her own business, passing a London Stock Exchange examination at the age of 17.

== Design career ==
Grachvogel's first fashion business was a partnership with a friend and fellow designer. After the partnership ended, she briefly returned to working in the City, but resumed designing within six months. She founded her own company in January 1991, aged 21, with a collection of nine dresses. She exhibited at London Fashion Week for the first time in 1994, and staged her first catwalk show there in 1995.

Grachvogel attracted international attention when Victoria Beckham appeared as a model in her February 2000 catwalk show at London Fashion Week. Beckham appeared first in green satin hot pants, followed by a flamenco-styled crimson gown, and reappeared at the end of the show in a long off-the-shoulder red dress.

Later that year Grachvogel again attracted publicity when she designed a dress hand-sewn with 2,000 diamonds worth approximately £250,000, (Now worth upwards of £5,000,000) for her September show. The dress was a long black silk evening gown slashed to the thigh, with the diamonds in rows on the bodice. The diamonds were set in 18-carat gold and totalled 190 carats in weight. The dress was modelled by Jodie Kidd, and formed the finale to the show.

Grachvogel launched her store in 2001, based in Sloane Street, London. Her designs include "Magic Pants", trousers without pockets or side seams designed to give the wearer a smooth silhouette. In 2011 the store moved to Culford Gardens, London.

== Personal life ==
Grachvogel married Mike Simcock, an investment banker, on her 40th birthday in July 2009. She gave birth to a son in March 2010.
