= Biznes & Baltiya =

Latvian newspaper

- Founder: Vladimir Gurov
- Publisher: B&B Practicum
- Editor-in-chief: Andrey Shvedov (last)
- Founded: 27 November 1991
- Ceased publication: September 2014
- Language: Russian
- Headquarters: Riga
- ISSN: 1407-3021

Biznes & Baltiya (Russian: Бизнес & Балтия) was a business newspaper published in Latvia.
