= Sweden in the Eurovision Song Contest 2000 =

- Eurovision Song Contest 2000
- Participating broadcaster: Sveriges Television (SVT)
- Country: Sweden
- Selection process: Melodifestivalen 2000
- Selection date: 10 March 2000

Competing entry
- Song: "When Spirits Are Calling My Name"
- Artist: Roger Pontare
- Songwriters: Peter Dahl; Linda Jansson; Thomas Holmstrand

Placement
- Final result: 7th, 88 points

Participation chronology

Sweden was represented at the Eurovision Song Contest 2000 with the song "When Spirits Are Calling My Name", written by Peter Dahl, Linda Jansson, and Thomas Holmstrand, and performed by Roger Pontare. The Swedish participating broadcaster, Sveriges Television (SVT), selected its entry through Melodifestivalen 2000. In addition, SVT was also the host broadcaster and staged the event at the Globe Arena in Stockholm, after winning the previous edition with the song "Take Me to Your Heaven" by Charlotte Nilsson.

== Before Eurovision ==
=== Melodifestivalen 2000 ===
The Melodifestivalen 2000 logo

Melodifestivalen 2000 was the selection for the 40th song to represent Sweden at the Eurovision Song Contest. It was the 39th time that this system of picking a song had been used; 1,394 songs were submitted to Sveriges Television (SVT) for the competition and 10 progressed to the final. The final was held in the Gothenburg Opera House in Gothenburg on 10 March 2000, and was broadcast on SVT2 and Sveriges Radio's P4 network. Roger Pontare (1994 winner with Marie Bergman) won the MF again with the rock-inspired ballad "När vindarna viskar mitt namn", donning a folk-inspired costume and featuring Sámi dancers during his performance.

The 2000 Melodifestivalen was presented by no less than 10 past participants and winners, who performed a medley of selected Melodifestivalen entries from the past four decades as an interval act. These were Carola Häggkvist, Lotta Engberg, Lena Philipsson, Loa Falkman, Tommy Körberg, Elisabeth Andreassen, Arja Saijonmaa, Lasse Berghagen, Lasse Holm and Björn Skifs. Two of the presenters, Lena Philipsson and Carola Häggkvist, went on to win the Melodifestivalen in 2004 and 2006, respectively (Carola had also won in 1983 and 1991 before). The show was watched by 4,175,000 people, with a total of 525,567 votes cast.

==== Competing entries ====
Artist	Song	Songwriter(s)
Avengers	"När filmen är slut"	Suss von Ahn, Henrik Wikström
Balsam Boys feat. Svenne and Lotta	"Bara du och jag"	Gustaf Eurén, Stefan Deak, Karl Eurén
Barbados	"Se mig"	Thomas Thörnholm, Dan Attlerud
Friends	"När jag tänker på i morgon"	Lasse Holm, Ingela 'Pling' Forsman
Guide	"Vi lever här, vi lever nu"	Mattias Reimer, Lars Edvall
Hanna Hedlund	"Anropar försvunnen"	Bobby Ljunggren, Robert Uhlmann, Anna-Lena Högdahl
Javiera	"Varje timma, var minut"	Johnny Thunqvist, Ulf Georgsson
Midnight Band	"Tillsammans"	Mikael Wendt, Christer Lundh
Roger Pontare	"När vindarna viskar mitt namn"	Thomas Holmstrand, Linda Jansson, Peter Dahl
Tom Nordahl	"Alla änglar sjunger"	Stephan Berg

==== Final ====
R/O	Artist	Song	Jury	Televote		Total	Place
R/O	Artist	Song	Jury	Votes	Points	Total	Place
1	Guide	"Vi lever här, vi lever nu"	53	34,239	44	97	5
2	Balsam Boys feat. Svenne and Lotta	"Bara du och jag"	43	26,229	11	54	7
3	Barbados	"Se mig"	58	43,289	88	146	2
4	Avengers	"När filmen är slut"	0	2,934	0	0	10
5	Tom Nordahl	"Alla änglar sjunger"	32	24,455	0	32	9
6	Roger Pontare	"När vindarna viskar mitt namn"	95	173,641	132	227	1
7	Javiera	"Varje timma, var minut"	73	35,691	66	139	4
8	Midnight Band	"Tillsammans"	58	25,727	0	58	6
9	Hanna Hedlund	"Anropar försvunnen"	25	31,921	22	47	8
10	Friends	"När jag tänker på i morgon"	36	127,441	110	146	2

Detailed Regional Jury Voting
R/O	Song	Luleå	Umeå	Sundsvall	Falun	Stockholm	Karlstad	Örebro	Norrköping	Växjö	Malmö	Gothenburg	Total
1	"Vi lever här, vi lever nu"		8	10	2	12	10	2	4		4	1	53
2	"Bara du och jag"	2		6	10	8	4	6	1			6	43
3	"Se mig"	10	1	4	6	10	8		12	2	1	4	58
4	"När filmen är slut"												0
5	"Alla änglar sjunger"	6	2	1	1	4		12		4	2		32
6	"När vindarna viskar mitt namn"	4	12	12	12	2	1	10	10	12	12	8	95
7	"Varje timma, var minut"	8	4	8		6	12	1	6	8	8	12	73
8	"Tillsammans"	12	10	2	8			8	8	10			58
9	"Anropar försvunnen"		6				2	4		1	10	2	25
10	"När jag tänker på i morgon"	1			4	1	6		2	6	6	10	36

== At Eurovision ==
Roger performed his song in 18th in the running order, following Croatia and preceding Macedonia, and received much cheers from the home public. The song had been translated into English and was now called "When Spirits Are Calling My Name", and the stage performance featured Native American and Sami themes. At the end of the voting, Sweden received 88 points (including 12 points from Turkey), finishing in 7th place which was enough to qualify them for the next contest as well.

=== Voting ===
Points awarded to Sweden
Score	Country
12 points	Turkey
10 points	Denmark
8 points	Germany
7 points	Finland
6 points	Ireland; Macedonia; Spain; United Kingdom
5 points	Belgium; Estonia; Norway
4 points	Iceland; Malta
3 points	Switzerland
2 points	
1 point	France

Points awarded by Sweden
Score	Country
12 points	Denmark
10 points	Latvia
8 points	Iceland
7 points	Norway
6 points	Estonia
5 points	Russia
4 points	Ireland
3 points	Malta
2 points	Finland
1 point	Turkey
