= Hilmarsson =

Hilmarsson is an Icelandic surname, and means 'son of Hilmar'. In Icelandic names, the name is not strictly a surname as it is not a family name, but a patronymic. The female variant is Hilmarsdóttir. Notable people with this name include:

- Arnar Rósenkranz Hilmarsson, drummer in Of Monsters and Men
- Atli Hilmarsson (born 1959), Icelandic handball player and Olypmpian
- Daníel Hilmarsson (born 1964), Icelandic alpine skier
- Haukur Hilmarsson (1986–2018), Icelandic activist
- Hilmar Örn Hilmarsson (born 1958), musician, art director and allsherjargoði of Ásatrúarfélagið
- Jörundur Garðar Hilmarsson (1946–1992), Icelandic linguist, grammarian and expert in Tocharian and Indo-European languages
- Siggi Hilmarsson, founder of Siggi's Dairy
- Stefán Hilmarsson (singer) (born 1966), Icelandic singer and translator
- Tómas Þórður Hilmarsson (born 1995), Icelandic basketball player

== See also ==
- Hilmar (disambiguation)
