= Gothic Bible =

Bible translation

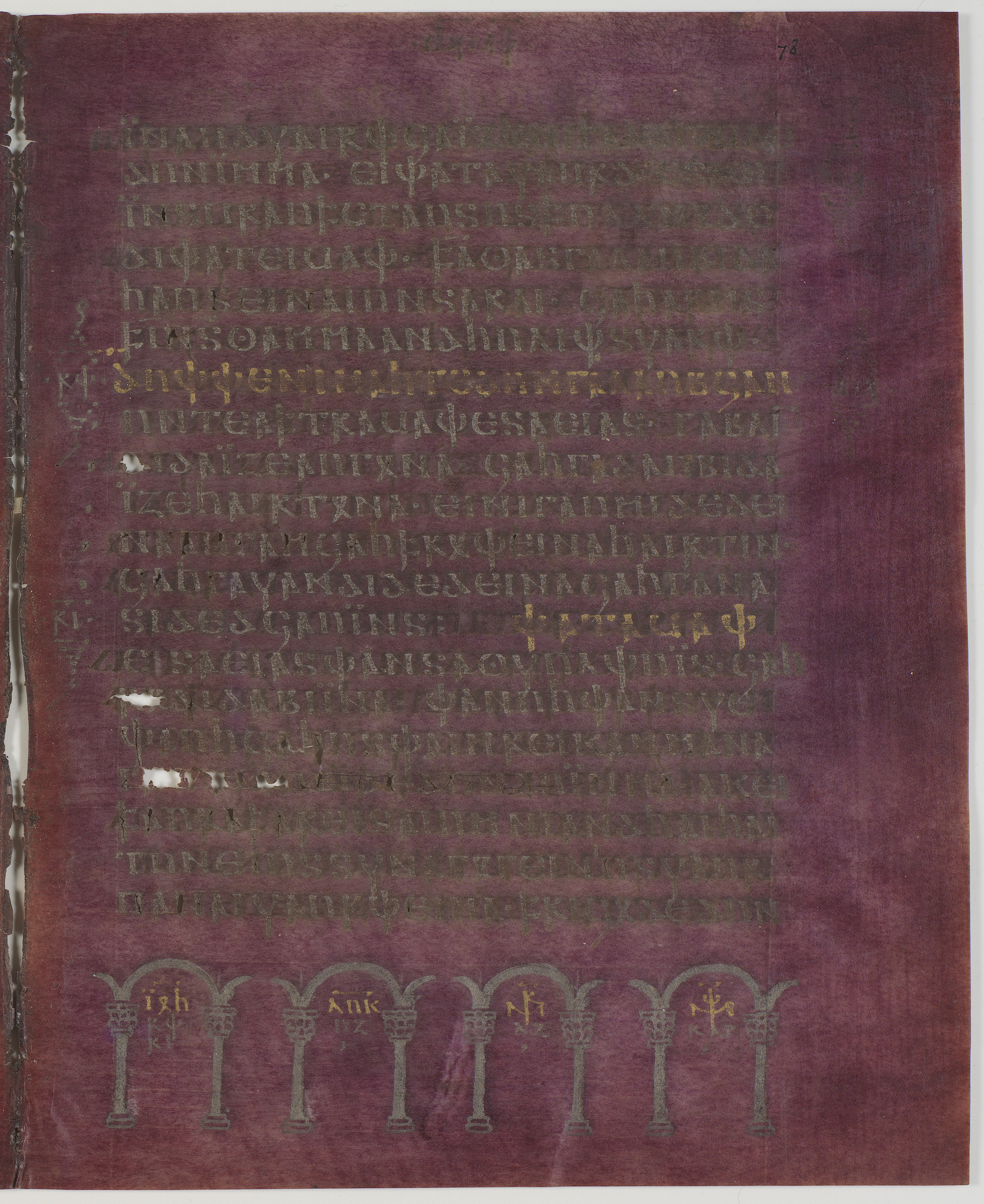
Page from the Codex Argenteus showing part of the Gothic Bible.

The Gothic Bible or Wulfila Bible is the Christian Bible in the Gothic language, which was spoken by the Eastern Germanic (Gothic) tribes in the Early Middle Ages.

The translation was allegedly made by the Arian bishop and missionary Wulfila in the fourth century. In the late 2010s, scholarly opinion, based on analyzing the linguistic properties of the Gothic text, holds that the translation of the Bible into Gothic was not or not solely performed by Wulfila, or any one person, but rather by a team of scholars.

== Codices ==
Surviving fragments of the Wulfila Bible consist of codices and one lead tablet from the 5th to 8th century containing a large part of the New Testament and some parts of the Old Testament, largely written in Italy. These are:

- Codex Argenteus, the longest and most celebrated of the manuscripts, which is kept in Uppsala,
- Codex Ambrosianus A through Codex Ambrosianus E, containing the epistles, Skeireins (in a fragment of Codex Ambrosianus E known as the Codex Vaticanus Latinus 5750), and Nehemiah 5–7,
- Codex Carolinus, a Gothic-Latin diglot palimpsest containing Romans 11–14,
- Codex Gissensis, apparently also a Gothic-Latin diglot, containing fragments of the Gospel of Luke,
- Gothica Bononiensia (also known as the Codex Boniensis), a recently discovered (2009) palimpsest fragment with what appears to be a sermon, containing direct Bible quotes and allusions, both from previously attested parts of the Gothic Bible (the text is clearly taken from Wulfilas' translation) and previously unattested ones (e.g. Psalms, Genesis).
- Fragmenta Pannonica (also known as the Hács-Béndekpuszta fragments or the Tabella Hungarica), which consist of 1 mm thick lead plates with fragmented remnants of verses from the Gospels.

== Historical context ==
During the third century, the Goths lived on the northeast border of the Roman Empire, in what is now Ukraine, Bulgaria and Romania. During the fourth century, the Goths were converted to Christianity, largely through the efforts of Bishop Wulfila, who is believed to have invented the Gothic alphabet. The translation of the Bible into the Gothic language is thought to have been performed in Nicopolis ad Istrum in today's northern Bulgaria. Traditionally ascribed to Wulfila, in reality it is believed the translation was performed by a group of scholars. Portions of this translation survive, affording the main surviving text written in the Gothic language.

During the fifth century, the Goths conquered parts of the Western Roman Empire, including Italy, southern France, and Spain. Gothic Christianity reigned in these areas for two centuries, before the re-establishment of the Catholic Church, and, in Spain, until the mass Gothic conversion to Catholicism in 589, after the Third Council of Toledo.

== Modern importance ==
The Wulfila Bible, although fragmentary, is the only extensive document in an ancient East Germanic language and one of the earliest documents in any Germanic language. Since the other East Germanic texts are of very limited extent, except maybe Skeireins, it is of great significance for the study of these languages.

== The Lord's Prayer ==
The following is the text of The Lord's Prayer in the Wulfila Bible, with transliteration into the Latin alphabet:

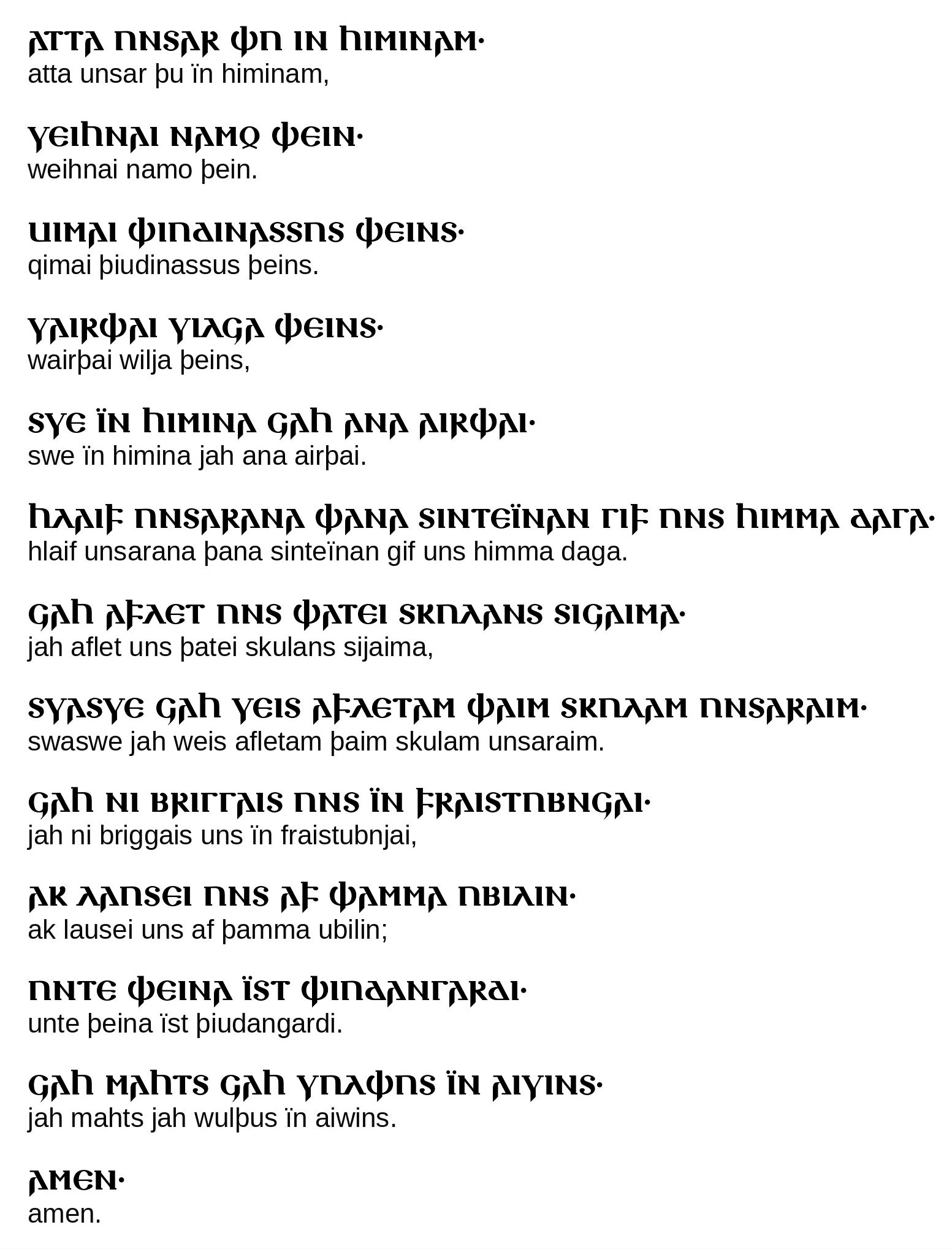
An image of the text for devices without Gothic Unicode support

𐌰𐍄𐍄𐌰 𐌿𐌽𐍃𐌰𐍂 𐌸𐌿 𐌹̈𐌽 𐌷𐌹𐌼𐌹𐌽𐌰𐌼·
atta unsar þu ïn himinam,
𐍅𐌴𐌹𐌷𐌽𐌰𐌹 𐌽𐌰𐌼𐍉 𐌸𐌴𐌹𐌽·
weihnai namo þein.
𐌵𐌹𐌼𐌰𐌹 𐌸𐌹𐌿𐌳𐌹𐌽𐌰𐍃𐍃𐌿𐍃 𐌸𐌴𐌹𐌽𐍃·
qimai þiudinassus þeins.
𐍅𐌰𐌹𐍂𐌸𐌰𐌹 𐍅𐌹𐌻𐌾𐌰 𐌸𐌴𐌹𐌽𐍃·
wairþai wilja þeins.
𐍃𐍅𐌴 𐌹̈𐌽 𐌷𐌹𐌼𐌹𐌽𐌰 𐌾𐌰𐌷 𐌰𐌽𐌰 𐌰𐌹𐍂𐌸𐌰𐌹·
swe ïn himina jah ana airþai.
𐌷𐌻𐌰𐌹𐍆 𐌿𐌽𐍃𐌰𐍂𐌰𐌽𐌰 𐌸𐌰𐌽𐌰 𐍃𐌹𐌽𐍄𐌴𐌹̈𐌽𐌰𐌽 𐌲𐌹𐍆 𐌿𐌽𐍃 𐌷𐌹𐌼𐌼𐌰 𐌳𐌰𐌲𐌰·
hlaif unsarana þana sinteïnan gif uns himma daga.
𐌾𐌰𐌷 𐌰𐍆𐌻𐌴𐍄 𐌿𐌽𐍃 𐌸𐌰𐍄𐌴𐌹 𐍃𐌺𐌿𐌻𐌰𐌽𐍃 𐍃𐌹𐌾𐌰𐌹𐌼𐌰·
jah aflet uns þatei skulans sijaima,
𐍃𐍅𐌰𐍃𐍅𐌴 𐌾𐌰𐌷 𐍅𐌴𐌹𐍃 𐌰𐍆𐌻𐌴𐍄𐌰𐌼 𐌸𐌰𐌹𐌼 𐍃𐌺𐌿𐌻𐌰𐌼 𐌿𐌽𐍃𐌰𐍂𐌰𐌹𐌼·
swaswe jah weis afletam þaim skulam unsaraim.
𐌾𐌰𐌷 𐌽𐌹 𐌱𐍂𐌹𐌲𐌲𐌰𐌹𐍃 𐌿𐌽𐍃 𐌹̈𐌽 𐍆𐍂𐌰𐌹𐍃𐍄𐌿𐌱𐌽𐌾𐌰𐌹·
jah ni briggais uns ïn fraistubnjai,
𐌰𐌺 𐌻𐌰𐌿𐍃𐌴𐌹 𐌿𐌽𐍃 𐌰𐍆 𐌸𐌰𐌼𐌼𐌰 𐌿𐌱𐌹𐌻𐌹𐌽·
ak lausei uns af þamma ubilin;
𐌿𐌽𐍄𐌴 𐌸𐌴𐌹𐌽𐌰 𐌹̈𐍃𐍄 𐌸𐌹𐌿𐌳𐌰𐌽𐌲𐌰𐍂𐌳𐌹·
unte þeina ïst þiudangardi.
𐌾𐌰𐌷 𐌼𐌰𐌷𐍄𐍃 𐌾𐌰𐌷 𐍅𐌿𐌻𐌸𐌿𐍃 𐌹̈𐌽 𐌰𐌹𐍅𐌹𐌽𐍃·
jah mahts jah wulþus ïn aiwins.
𐌰𐌼𐌴𐌽·
amen.

== Bibliography ==
- Carla Falluomini (2015). The Gothic Version of the Gospels and Pauline Epistles: Cultural Background, Transmission and Character. Berlin: de Gruyter. ISBN 978-3-11-033469-2.
- H. C. von Gabelentz, J. Loebe, Ulfilas: Veteris et Novi Testamenti Versionis Gothicae fragmenta quae supersunt, Leipzig, Libraria Schnuphasiana, 1843.
- Frederick Lauritzen (January 2019). "Nonnos and Wulfila". Parekbolai. 9, 2019: 19–30.
- Frederick Lauritzen. "The gothic Psalter between Crimea and Bologna". Revue des Études Tardo-Antiques. 9, 2019: 109–120.
- Wilhelm Streitberg (ed.), Die Gotische Bibel (1908), Heidelberg: Universitätsverlag C. Winter, 2000, (7th edition) ISBN 3-8253-0745-X
- Carla Falluomini. "Textkritische Anmerkungen zur gotischen Bibel" (PDF). AnnalSS. 5, 2005 (2009): 311–320. Archived from the original (PDF) on February 2, 2014.
