= Tocharian and Indo-European Studies =

Scholarly journal

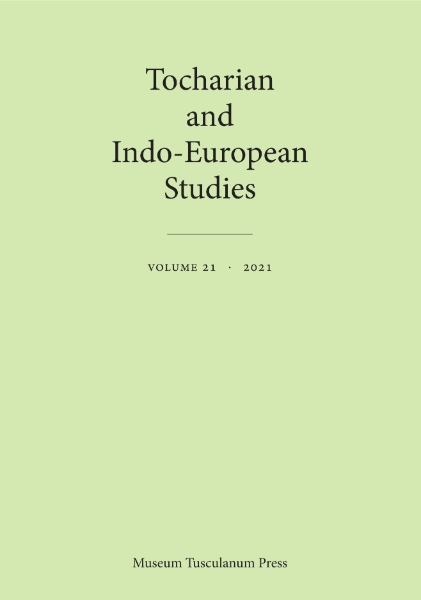
- Language: English

Publication details
- History: Since 1987
- Publisher: Museum Tusculanum Press (Denmark)
- Frequency: Yearly
- Open access: No
- ISO 4: Find out here

Indexing
- ISSN: 1012-9286

Links
- Journal homepage

Tocharian and Indo-European Studies (TIES) is a scholarly journal on Tocharian in the Indo-European context, established in 1987 by Icelandic linguist Jörundur Hilmarsson. The journal initially appeared in Reykjavík, Iceland, until Hilmarsson's death in 1992, when Danish Indo-Europeanist Jens Elmegård Rasmussen took over as executive editor and publication moved to the Copenhagen-based publisher C.A. Reitzel Publishers Ltd. Since vol. 11 (2009), TIES has been published by Museum Tusculanum Press. When Rasmussen died in 2013, his wife Birgit Anette Olsen became the new executive editor.

== Editors-in-chief ==
=== Current editor ===
- Birgit Anette Olsen (Copenhagen, executive editor, 2013–present)

=== Selected former editors ===
- Jörundur Hilmarsson (Reykjavík, founder and editor-in-chief, 1987–1992)
- Jens Elmegård Rasmussen (Copenhagen, executive editor, 1992–2013)
- Werner Winter (Preetz, died 2010)
- Guðrún Þórhallsdóttir (1992–1993 and supervisor of the supplementary series 1992–1997)
