= 2001 Viennese state election =

- 25 March 2001

All 100 seats in the Gemeinderat and Landtag of Vienna 51 seats needed for a majority All 15 seats in the state government
- Turnout: 730,162 (66.6%) ▼1.9%
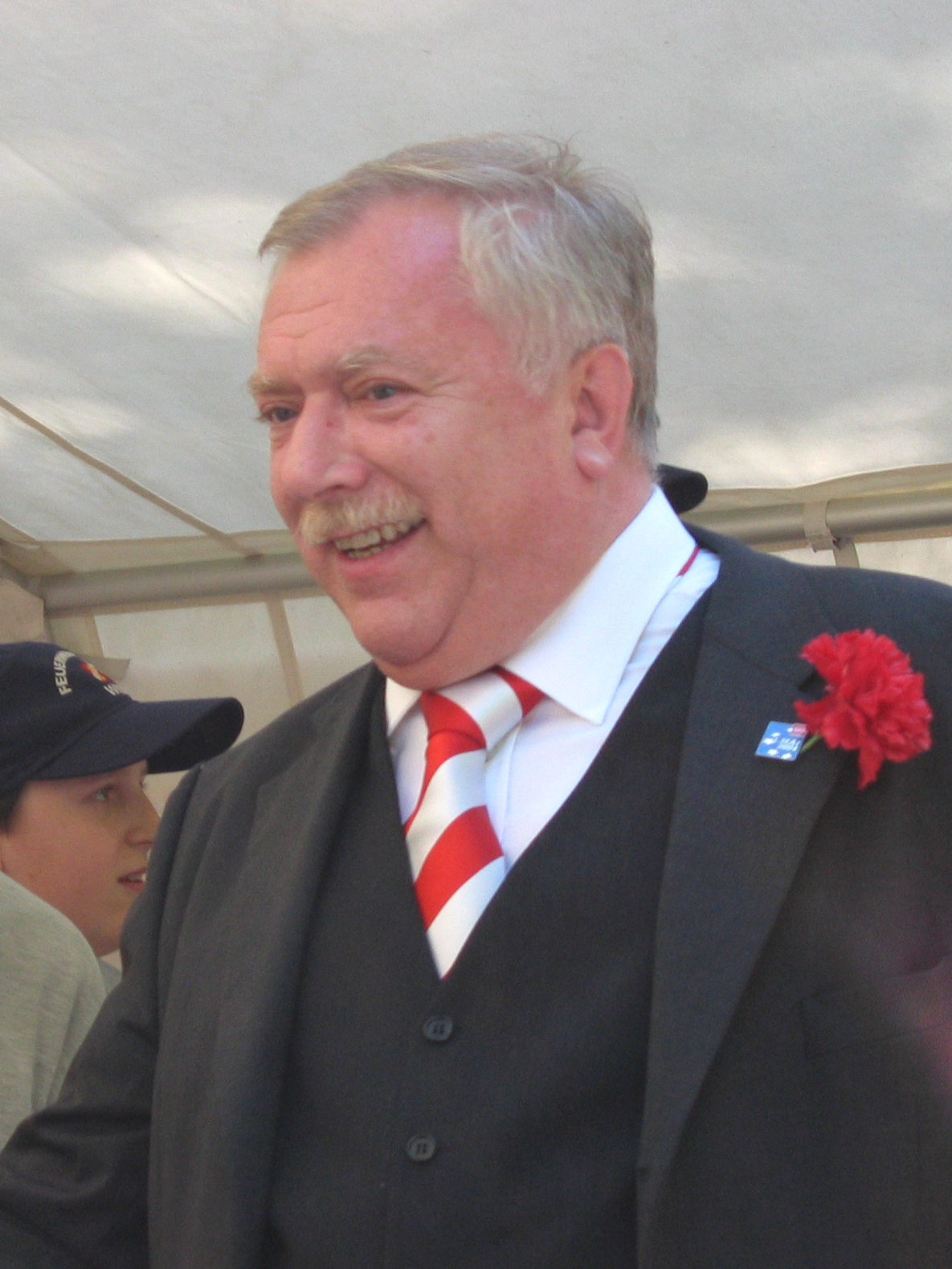

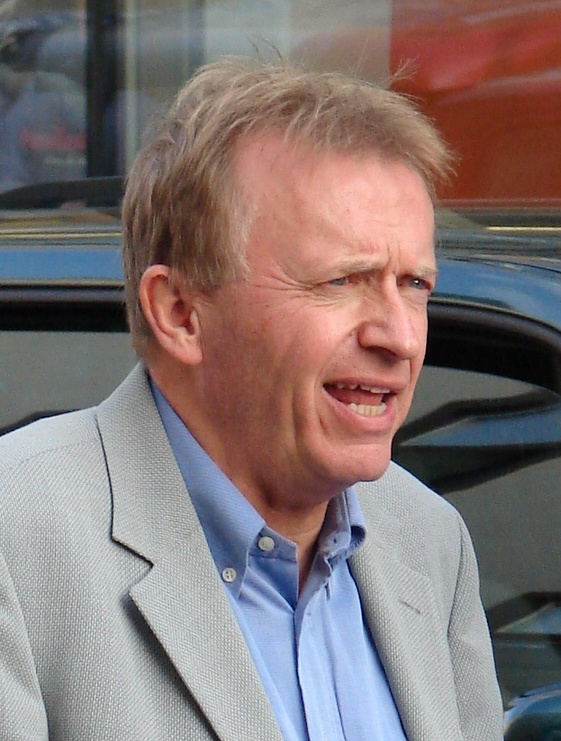

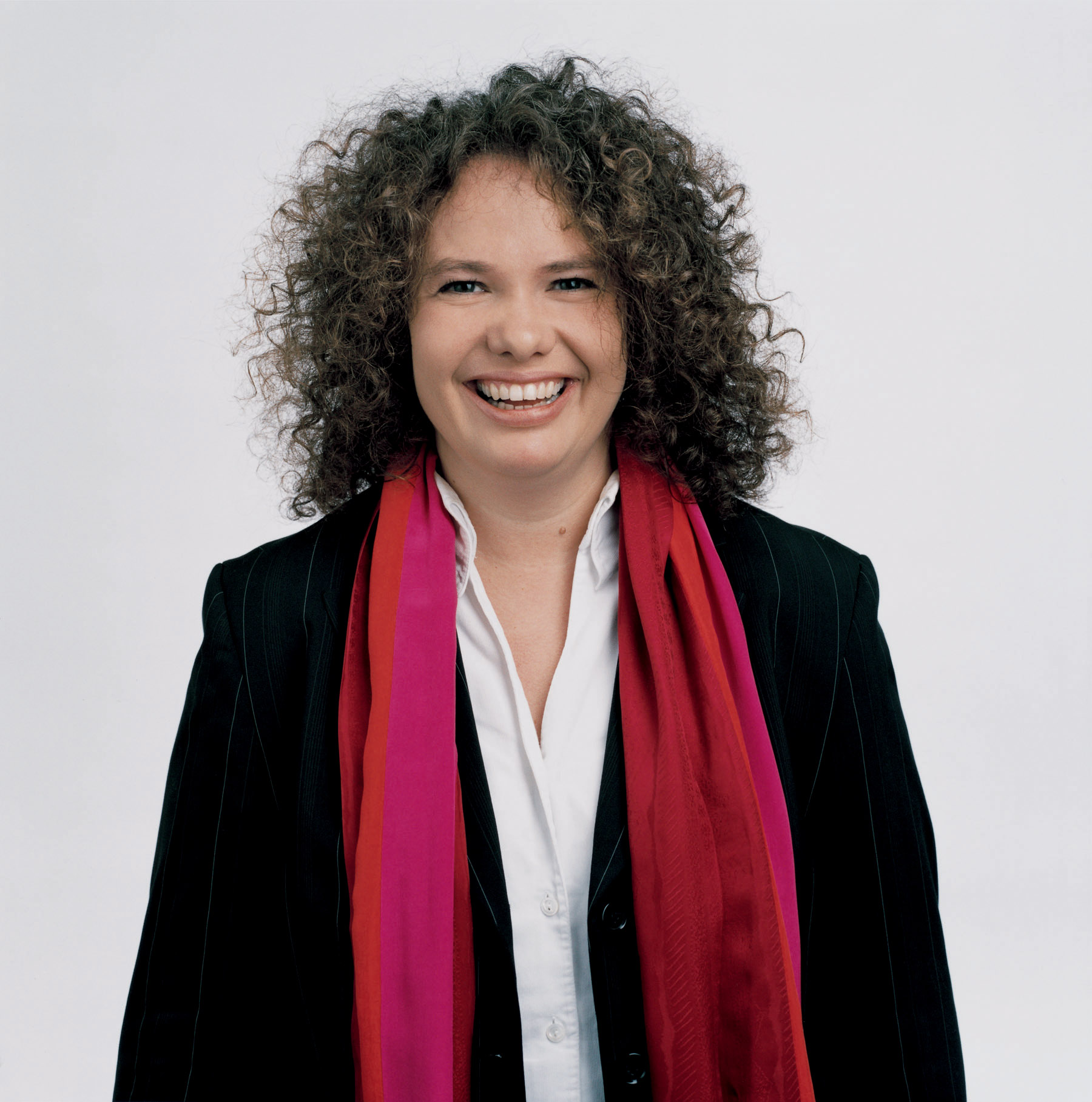
	First party	Second party	Third party
			ÖVP
Leader	Michael Häupl	Hilmar Kabas	Bernhard Görg
Party	SPÖ	FPÖ	ÖVP
Last election	43 seats, 39.2%	29 seats, 27.9%	15 seats, 15.3%
Seats won	52	21	16
Seat change	▲9	▼8	▲1
Popular vote	336,832	144,747	117,683
Percentage	46.9%	20.2%	16.4%
Swing	▲7.8%	▼7.8%	▲1.1%
	Fourth party	Fifth party
Leader	Monika Vana	Alexandra Bolena
Party	Greens	LiF
Last election	7 seats, 7.9%	6 seats, 8.0%
Seats won	11	0
Seat change	▲4	▼6
Popular vote	89,395	24,669
Percentage	12.4%	3.4%
Swing	▲4.5%	▼4.5%
Mayor and Governor before election
Michael Häupl
SPÖ
Elected Mayor and Governor
Michael Häupl
SPÖ

The 2001 Viennese state election was held on 25 March 2001 to elect the members of the Gemeinderat and Landtag of Vienna.

The election was won by the Social Democratic Party of Austria (SPÖ), who reclaimed the absolute majority in the Gemeinderat and Landtag which they had lost in 1996. This came to the detriment of the Freedom Party of Austria (FPÖ), which suffered substantial losses; the Liberal Forum (LIF) also lost all its seats after only one term in the Landtag. The Greens made modest gains, and the Austrian People's Party (ÖVP) saw a slight improvement.

With its majority in both the Landtag and city government recovered, the SPÖ terminated its coalition with the ÖVP and returned to governing alone.

== Background ==
The Viennese constitution mandates that cabinet positions in the city government (city councillors, German: Stadtsräten) be allocated between parties proportionally in accordance with the share of votes won by each; this is known as Proporz. The number of city councillors is voted upon by the Landtag after each election, and may legally vary between nine and fifteen. City councillors are divided into two groups – "senior" councillors, who hold a cabinet portfolio, and "non-executive" councillors who do not. Non-executive councillors may vote in cabinet meetings, but do not otherwise hold any government responsibility. In practice, parties seek to form a coalition which holds a majority in both the Landtag and city government. City councillors bound to the coalition become senior councillors, while the opposition are relegated to non-executive status.

In the 1996 state election, the SPÖ lost its absolute majority for the first time in history, falling to 39.2%, by far its worst ever result. The ÖVP and Greens also suffered losses, with the FPÖ made significant gains, and its centrist splinter Liberal Forum debuted at 8%. The SPÖ also fell short of a majority in the city government, winning seven of fourteen councillors. The FPÖ won four, the ÖVP two, and the Greens one. The SPÖ subsequently formed a coalition with the ÖVP.

== Electoral system ==
The 100 seats of the Gemeinderat and Landtag of Vienna are elected via open list proportional representation in a two-step process. The seats are distributed between eighteen multi-member constituencies. For parties to receive any representation in the Landtag, they must either win at least one seat in a constituency directly, or clear a 5 percent state-wide electoral threshold. Seats are distributed in constituencies according to the Hare quota, with any remaining seats allocated using the D'Hondt method at the state level, to ensure overall proportionality between a party's vote share and its share of seats.

== Contesting parties ==
The table below lists parties represented in the previous Landtag.

Name		Ideology	Leader	1996 result		
Name		Ideology	Leader	Votes (%)	Seats	Councillors
SPÖ	Social Democratic Party of Austria; Sozialdemokratische Partei Österreichs	Social democracy	Michael Häupl	39.2%	43 / 100	7 / 14
FPÖ	Freedom Party of Austria; Freiheitliche Partei Österreichs	Right-wing populism Euroscepticism	Hilmar Kabas	27.9%	29 / 100	4 / 14
ÖVP	Austrian People's Party; Österreichische Volkspartei	Christian democracy	Bernhard Görg	15.3%	15 / 100	2 / 14
GRÜNE	The Greens – The Green Alternative; Die Grünen – Die Grüne Alternative	Green politics	Monika Vana	7.9%	7 / 100	1 / 14
LIF	Liberal Forum; Liberales Forum	Liberalism	Alexandra Bolena	8.0%	6 / 100	

In addition to the parties already represented in the Landtag, three parties collected enough signatures to be placed on the ballot.

- Communist Party of Austria (KPÖ)
- Socialist Left Party (SLP) – on the ballot only in Centre
- Bill Clinton – Handy Börse Fanclub (BCH)

== Results ==
Party	Votes	%	+/−	Seats	+/−	Coun.	+/−
Social Democratic Party of Austria (SPÖ)	336,832	46.91	+7.76	52	+9	9	+2
Freedom Party of Austria (FPÖ)	144,747	20.16	–7.78	21	–8	3	–1
Austrian People's Party (ÖVP)	117,683	16.39	+1.13	16	+1	2	±0
The Greens – The Green Alternative (GRÜNE)	89,395	12.45	+4.51	11	+4	1	±0
Liberal Forum (LIF)	24,669	3.43	–4.52	0	–6	0	±0
Communist Party of Austria (KPÖ)	4,566	0.64	+0.07	0	±0	0	±0
Socialist Left Party (SLP)	100	0.01	New	0	New	0	New
Bill Clinton – Handy Börse Fanclub (BCH)	67	0.01	New	0	New	0	New
Invalid/blank votes	12,103	–	–	–	–	–	–
Total	730,162	100	–	100	0	15	+1
Registered voters/turnout	1,096,732	66.58	–1.88	–	–	–	–
Source: Viennese Government

Popular vote
SPÖ	46.91%
FPÖ	20.16%
ÖVP	16.39%
GRÜNE	12.45%
LIF	3.43%
Other	0.66%

Gemeinderat and Landtag seats
SPÖ	52.00%
FPÖ	21.00%
ÖVP	16.00%
GRÜNE	11.00%

=== Results by constituency ===
Constituency	SPÖ		FPÖ		ÖVP		Grüne		LIF		Others	Total seats	Turnout
Constituency	%	S	%	S	%	S	%	S	%	S	%	Total seats	Turnout
Centre	35.5	3	18.5	1	21.1	1	19.5	1	4.4		0.9	6	65.6
Inner West	32.0	2	16.5	1	21.7	1	23.9	1	5.2		0.7	5	66.5
Leopoldstadt	47.3	3	20.3	1	13.9		14.5	1	3.2		0.8	5	65.8
Landstraße	41.4	2	19.3	1	18.5	1	16.2		3.9		0.7	4	65.8
Favoriten	59.9	6	22.8	2	10.8	1	7.5		2.4		0.7	9	65.1
Simmering	59.2	2	21.7	1	9.8		6.3		2.4		0.6	3	65.7
Meidling	49.8	2	21.4	1	14.2		11.0		3.1		0.6	3	64.9
Hietzing	35.3	1	18.3		29.1	1	12.4		4.5		0.5	2	71.0
Penzing	44.8	2	20.1	1	18.4	1	12.7		3.6		0.5	4	67.4
Rudolfsheim-Fünfhaus	48.3	2	21.5	1	12.9		13.6		3.0		0.7	3	62.5
Ottakring	50.0	2	20.9	1	13.4		12.1		2.9		0.7	3	66.4
Hernals	40.7	1	21.2		19.6		14.0		3.9		0.6	1	66.9
Währing	31.1	1	17.7		28.4	1	17.6		4.5		0.7	2	68.4
Döbling	37.0	2	18.6	1	27.6	1	12.1		4.2		0.4	4	70.5
Brigittenau	53.2	2	22.6	1	10.4		9.9		3.0		0.8	3	64.4
Floridsdorf	55.6	5	20.5	2	12.0	1	8.6		2.8		0.6	8	66.6
Donaustadt	55.3	4	20.2	1	11.8	1	9.0		3.1		0.7	6	66.7
Liesing	49.2	3	19.5	1	17.0	1	10.6		3.3		0.6	5	70.5
Remaining seats		7		4		5		8		–		24	
Total	46.9	52	20.2	21	16.4	16	12.4	11	3.4	0	0.6	100	66.6
Source: Viennese Government
