= Codex Ambrosianus =

Codex Ambrosianus may refer to:

- Codices Ambrosiani, five manuscripts containing rare text in the Gothic language
- Codex Ambrosianus 435, containing Aristotle's On the Soul
- Codex Ambrosianus 837, containing Aristotle's On the Soul
