= Codex Gissensis =

Fragment of a Gothic-Latin manuscript

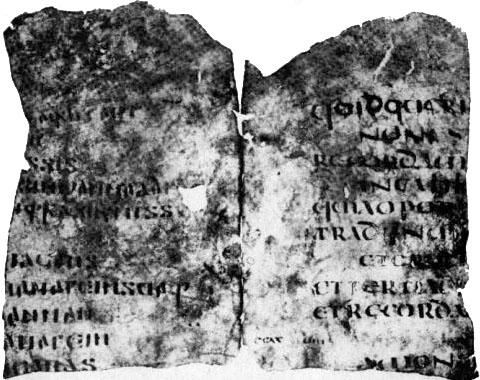
Photo of the lost leaf

The Codex Gissensis (Universitätsbibliothek Giessen, Handschrift 651/20) was a fragmentary parchment manuscript, a Gothic–Latin diglot containing texts of the Bible in Gothic on the left and Latin on the right.

The manuscript was made in the 6th century AD. Only a double-folio single leaf was known. It was discovered in Antinoë in Egypt and in 1907 brought to the German town Giessen, from which it gets is common name. During World War II, the manuscript was placed in the vault of the Dresdner Bank branch in Giessen to protect it from air raids. In 1945, the river Lahn flooded the vault and the manuscript was destroyed. The manuscript can be studied today only from photographs taken in 1910.

The Gothic column contain the text from Luke 23:11–14 and 24:13–17, while the Latin contains some from Luke 23:3–6, 24:5–9. The Gothic Bible is the 4th-century translation of Ulfilas, while the Latin is the Vetus Latina with some readings from the Vulgate.

== Editions ==
- Glaue, P.; Helm, K. (1910). "Das gotisch-lateinische Bibelfragment der Großherzoglichen Universitätsbibliothek Gießen" [The Gothic-Latin Bible fragment from the Grand Ducal University Library in Giessen]. Zeitschrift für die Neutestamentliche Wissenschaft 11, 1, pp. 1–38.
- Kuhlmann, Peter Alois (1994). Die Giessener literarischen Papyri und die Caracalla-Erlasse. Edition, Übersetzung und Kommentar [The Giessen Literary Papyri and the Caracalla Edicts. Edition, translation and commentary]. Gießen: Universitätsbibliothek.
