= Hilmar =

Hilmar is a Germanic and Nordic given name, meaning famous/notorious fighter/noble/protector.

Hilmar may refer to:

== Places ==
- Hilmar, California
  - Hilmar Cheese Company, cheese and whey products manufacturer headquartered in Hilmar, California
- Hilmar-Irwin, census-designated place (CDP) in Merced County, California, United States

== People ==
=== Given name ===
- Hilmar Baunsgaard (1920–1989), Danish politician
- Hilmar Björnsson (born 1969), Icelandic football (soccer) player
- Hilmar Duerbeck (1948–2012), German astronomer
- Hilmar Örn Hilmarsson (born 1958), musician and art director
- Hilmar Hoffmann (1925–2018), German cultural worker and functionary
- Hilmar Kabas (born 1942), Austrian politician
- Hilmar Meincke Krohg (1776–1851), Norwegian politician
- Hilmar Kopper (1935–2021), German banker and former Chairman of the Board of Deutsche Bank
- Hilmar Moore (1920–2012), American rancher and the mayor of Richmond, Texas
- Hilmar Myhra (1915–2013), Norwegian ski jumper
- Hilmar Reksten (1897–1980), Norwegian shipping magnate
- Hilmar Martinus Strøm (1817–?), Norwegian politician
- Hilmar Thate (1931–2016), German actor
- Hilmar Wäckerle (1899–1941), German soldier in the German Imperial Army and the Waffen-SS
- Hilmar Weilandt (born 1966), German football player
- Hilmar Wictorin (1894–1964), Swedish water polo player and Olympian
- Hilmar Zahn (1919–2008), highly decorated paratrooper and captain in the Nazi German army

=== Middle name ===
- Geir Hilmar Haarde (born 1951), Icelandic politician and former Prime Minister
- Jobst-Hilmar von Bose (1897–1949), decorated military in the German Empire and in Nazi Germany
- Paul Hilmar Jensen (1930–2004), Norwegian philatelist

=== Family name ===
- Ernst Hilmar (1938–2016), Austrian librarian, editor, and musicologist
- Gustav Hilmar (1891–1967), Czechoslovak film actor
