= Skeireins =

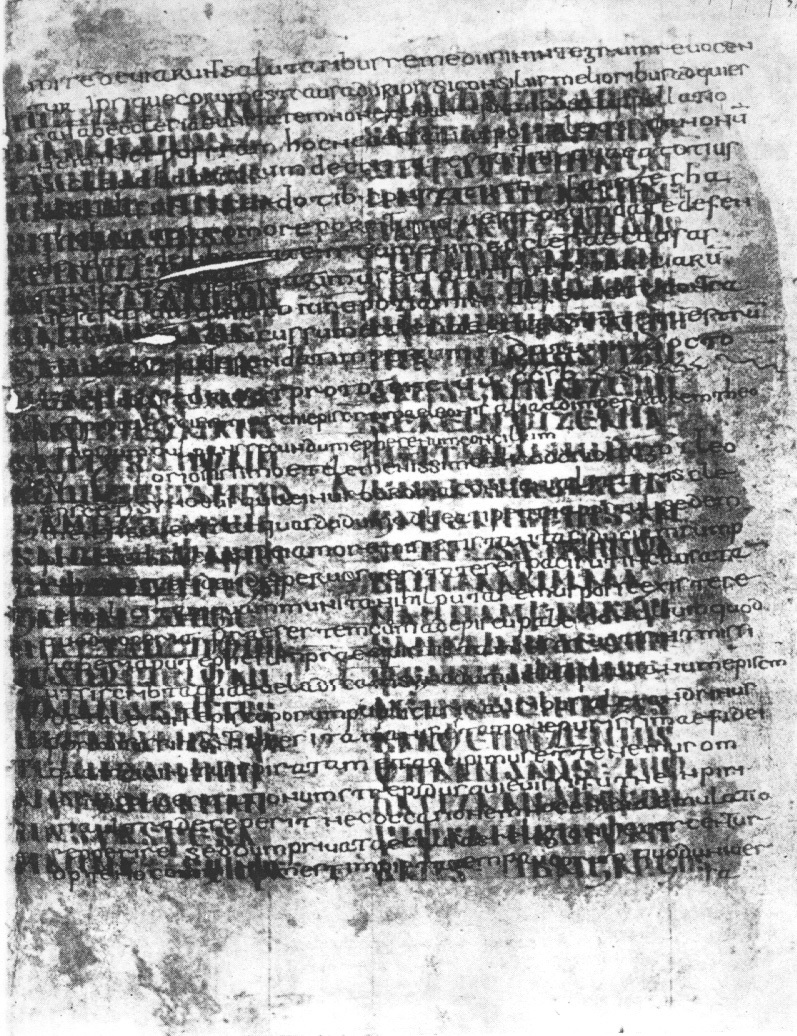
Codex Vaticanus latinus, 5750, part of "Skeireins", a commentary to the Gospel of John in Gothic.

The Skeireins (Gothic: 𐍃𐌺𐌴𐌹𐍂𐌴𐌹𐌽𐍃; pronounced [ˈskiːriːns]) is the second-longest known surviving text in the Gothic language, after the version of the Bible by Wulfilas. It consists of eight fragments of a commentary on the Gospel of John which is commonly held to have originally extended over seventy-eight parchment leaves. It owes its title to the 19th-century German scholar Hans Ferdinand Massmann, who was the first to issue a comprehensive and correct edition of it: "Skeireins" means "explanation" in Gothic.

The manuscript containing the Skeireins is a palimpsest. Part of it is in Codex Ambrosianus E, and the other part is housed at the Vatican Library (Vat. lat. 5750) in Rome.

There are conflicting views on whether the Skeireins was written directly in Gothic by a native speaker or whether it was a translation from a Greek original. Schäferdiek (1981) observes striking similarities between the Gothic of the Skeireins and the Greek of Theodore of Heraclea's commentary on the Gospel of John.

== See also ==
- Codex Carolinus
