= Jörundur Garðar Hilmarsson =

Icelandic linguist (1946–1992)

Jörundur Hilmarsson
- Born: 15 March 1946; Reykjavík, Iceland
- Died: 13 August 1992 (aged 46); Reykjavík, Iceland
- Known for: Contributions to Baltistics and Tocharian linguistics

Academic background
- Education: Leiden University
- Thesis: Studies in Tocharian Phonology, Morphology and Etymology with Special Emphasis on the o-Vocalism (1986)
- Doctoral advisor: Werner Winter

Academic work
- Notable works: Tocharian and Indo-European Studies (founder, editor-in-chief)
- Notable ideas: Hilmarsson's rule

Jörundur Garðar Hilmarsson (15 March 1946 – 13 August 1992) was an Icelandic linguist, scholar, and grammarian specializing in comparative grammar of Indo-European languages. In 1987, he established the international scholarly journal Tocharian and Indo-European Studies (TIES) and continued to head its editorial staff from Reykjavík until his death from cancer in 1992 at the age of 46. He placed great importance on the study of the Tocharian languages, authoring a detailed etymological dictionary for the language.

Jörundur finished his doctorate at Leiden University in 1986 with a thesis entitled Studies in Tocharian Phonology, Morphology and Etymology with Special Emphasis on the o-Vocalism. Upon his death, Tocharian and Indo-European Studies moved from Reykjavík to Copenhagen, with the Danish professor of Indo-European languages Jens Elmegård Rasmussen as the new executive editor. Upon Jörundur's death, the journal published most of his work in 1996 under the title: Materials for a Tocharian Historical and Etymological Dictionary.
