= Roots of Europe =

Research center

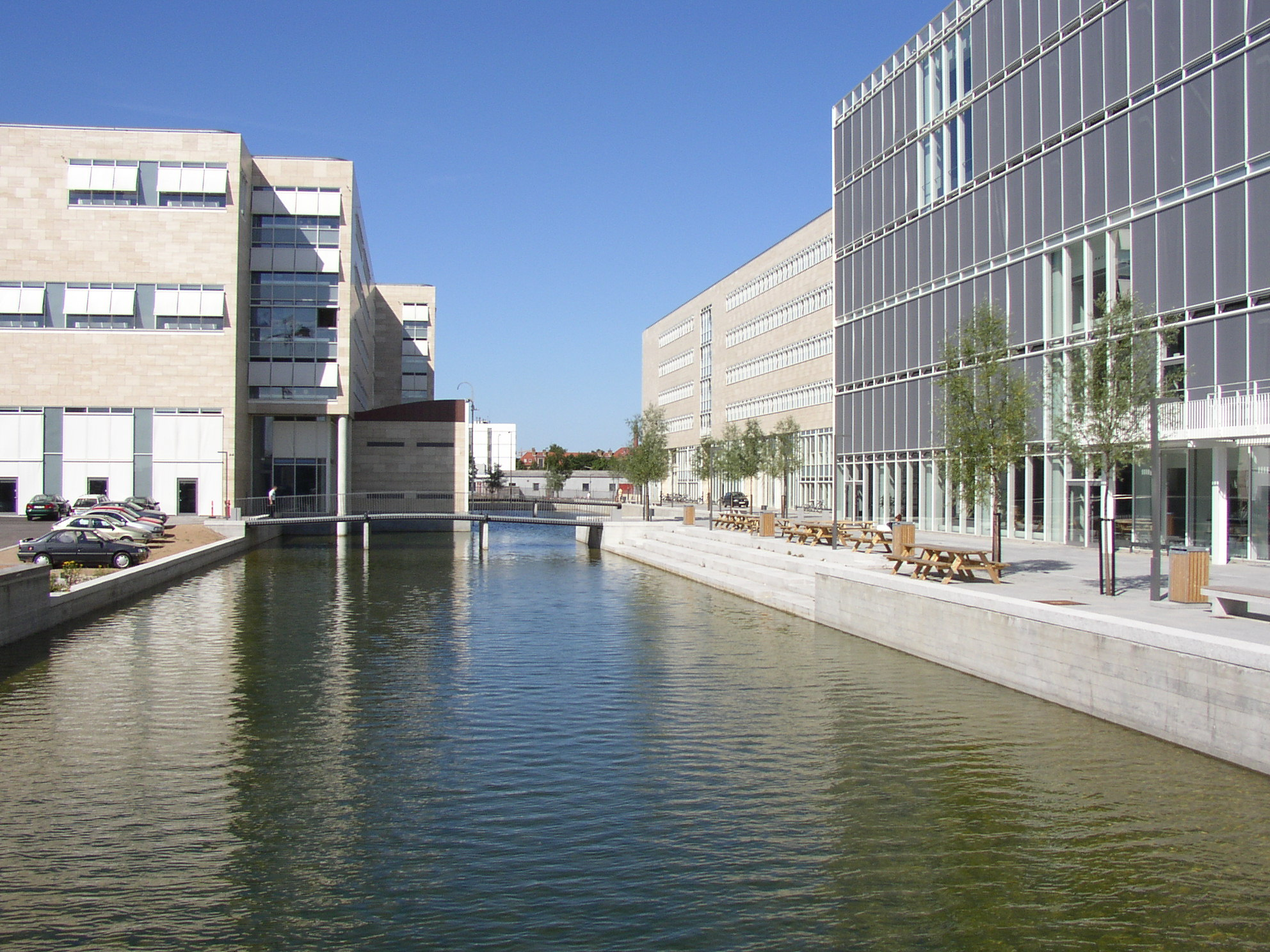
The building which houses the Roots of Europe centre at the Faculty of Humanities.

Roots of Europe (full name: Roots of Europe – Language, Culture, and Migrations) is an interdisciplinary research centre at the University of Copenhagen, focusing on prehistoric Europe. It is headed by Birgit Anette Olsen (2008-2013 by Jens Elmegård Rasmussen) and involves more than 40 linguists, archaeologists, geneticists and other scholars from universities in Europe and the USA. The centre was initiated in 2008 and is financed through the University of Copenhagen Programmes of Excellence. It has close ties to the local programme in Indo-European studies. It is physically based at the Department of Nordic Studies and Linguistics and hosts the departmental collection of Indo-European linguistics handbooks.

== Structure and activities ==
The common research projects are organized from Copenhagen. While the basic working group there mainly concentrates on the linguistic aspects, the external project members deal both with linguistics, religion and mythology, archaeology and genetics. An international advisory board covers all of the basic fields. From 2013 onwards, the centre also functions as an umbrella for several new research projects, which do not form part of the original programme but are founded by the VELUX foundation and the Danish Research Council for the Humanities. Research results emerging from the projects are published mainly in the book series Copenhagen Studies in Indo-European.

== Heads of centre ==
- Jens Elmegård Rasmussen (2008-2013)
- Birgit Anette Olsen (2013-)
