= Copenhagen Studies in Indo-European =

Academic book series on Indo-European studies

Copenhagen Studies in Indo-European (ISSN 1399-5308) is an academic book series on Indo-European studies and related subjects. The series was founded in 1999 and is published by Museum Tusculanum Press. Its chief editor was Jens Elmegård Rasmussen from its initiation until his death in 2013. The current chief editor is Birgit Anette Olsen.

== Volumes ==
- #9. Kin, Clan and Community in Prehistoric Europe, edited by Birgit Anette Olsen and Benedicte Whitehead Nielsen (2021). ISBN 978-8763546188
- #8. Usque ad Radices. Indo-European Studies in Honour of Birgit Anette Olsen, edited by Bjarne Simmelkjær Sandgaard Hansen, Adam Hyllested, Anders Richardt Jørgensen, Guus Kroonen, Jenny Helena Larsson, Benedicte Nielsen Whitehead, Thomas Olander and Tobias Mosbæk Søborg (2017). ISBN 978-87-635-4576-1
- #7. Language and Prehistory of the Indo-European Peoples. A Cross-Disciplinary Perspective, edited by Adam Hyllested, Benedicte Nielsen Whitehead, Thomas Olander and Birgit Anette Olsen (2017). ISBN 978-87-635-4421-4
- #6. The Linguistic Roots of Europe, edited by Robert Mailhammer, Theo Vennemann and Birgit Anette Olsen (2015). ISBN 978-87-635-4209-8
- #5. Indo-European accent and ablaut, edited by Thomas Olander, Paul Widmer and Götz Keydana (2013). ISBN 978-87-635-3964-7
- #4. The Sound of Indo-European, edited by Benedicte Nielsen Whitehead, Thomas Olander, Birgit Anette Olsen and Jens Elmegård Rasmussen (2012). ISBN 978-87-635-3838-1
- #3. Internal Reconstruction in Indo-European, edited by Thomas Olander and Jens Elmegård Rasmussen (2009). ISBN 978-87-635-0785-1
- #2. Indo-European Word Formation, edited by Birgit Anette Olsen and James Clackson (2004). ISBN 978-87-7289-821-6
- #1. Selected Papers on Indo-European Linguistics, by Jens Elmegård Rasmussen (1999). Vol. 1-2. ISBN 978-87-7289-529-1
