= Jens Elmegård Rasmussen =

Danish linguist (1944–2013)

- Elmegård Rasmussen, c. 2004
- Born: 15 March 1944
- Died: 15 May 2013 (aged 69)
- Occupation: Linguist
- Spouse: Birgit Anette Olsen

Jens Elmegård Rasmussen (15 March 1944 – 15 May 2013) was a Danish linguist who served as associate professor of Indo-European Studies and head of the Roots of Europe research center at the University of Copenhagen from its initiation in 2008 until his death. He was an expert on Proto-Indo-European and Indo-European languages in general, especially morphophonemics, but he also published articles on the history of Eskimo–Aleut languages and linguistic diachrony. He supported the Indo-Uralic and Eurasiatic hypotheses.

Elmegård Rasmussen was the leading editor of the international scholarly journal Tocharian and Indo-European Studies (TIES) and chief editor of the book series Copenhagen Studies in Indo-European. He was married to the Danish Indo-Europeanist Birgit Anette Olsen.

== Selected publications ==
- 1979, Anaptyxis, gemination and syncope in Eskimo: A diachronic study. Copenhagen: Copenhagen Linguistic Circle.
- 1989, Studien zur Morphophonemik der Indogermanischen Grundsprache. Innsbruck: Innsbrucker Beiträge zur Sprachwissenschaft.
- 1999, Selected Papers on Indo-European Linguistics. Copenhagen: Museum Tusculanum Press.
