= Hilmarsdóttir =

Hilmarsdóttir is an Icelandic patronymic. In Icelandic names, this is not a family name. Notable people with the name include:

- Hera Hilmarsdóttir (born 1988), Icelandic actress
- Nanna Bryndís Hilmarsdóttir (born 1989), Icelandic musician
