= Fernand Mossé =

French philologist

- Born: Fernand, Lionel Mossé; 25 May 1892; Marseille
- Died: 10 July 1956 (aged 64)
- Occupation: Philologist

Fernand Mossé (25 May 1892 – 10 July 1956) was a 20th-century French philologist and historian, specialized in Germanic languages and German literature.

== Biography ==
An agrégé of English, Fernand Mossé was a lecturer at the Bangor University in Wales. He later taught in lycées ('secondary education') in Nice and Nancy. In 1926, he was appointed Director of Studies at the École pratique des hautes études. In 1938, he defended his doctoral dissertation, Histoire de la forme périphrastique être + participe présent en germanique, devoted to periphrastic forms of English. In 1949 he was appointed to the chair of languages and literatures of Germanic origin at the Collège de France.

== Selected bibliography ==
- 1914: La Laxdoela Saga : légende historique islandaise, Paris, Alcan (translation)
- 1933: La Saga de Grettir, Paris, Aubier Montaigne (translation)
- 1938: Histoire de la forme périphrastique être + participe présent en germanique, Paris, Klincksieck
- 1942: Manuel de la langue gotique, Paris, Aubier Montaigne
- 1942: Manuel de l'allemand du Moyen Âge, des origines au XIVe siècle (with Alfred Jolivet), Paris, Aubier Montaigne
- 1946: Manuel de l'anglais du Moyen Âge, des origines au XIVe siècle, 4 vol., Paris, Aubier Montaigne
- 1947: Esquisse d'une histoire de la langue anglaise
- 1959: Histoire de la littérature allemande (ed), Aubier
