= Hilmar Kabas =

Austrian politician (born 1942)

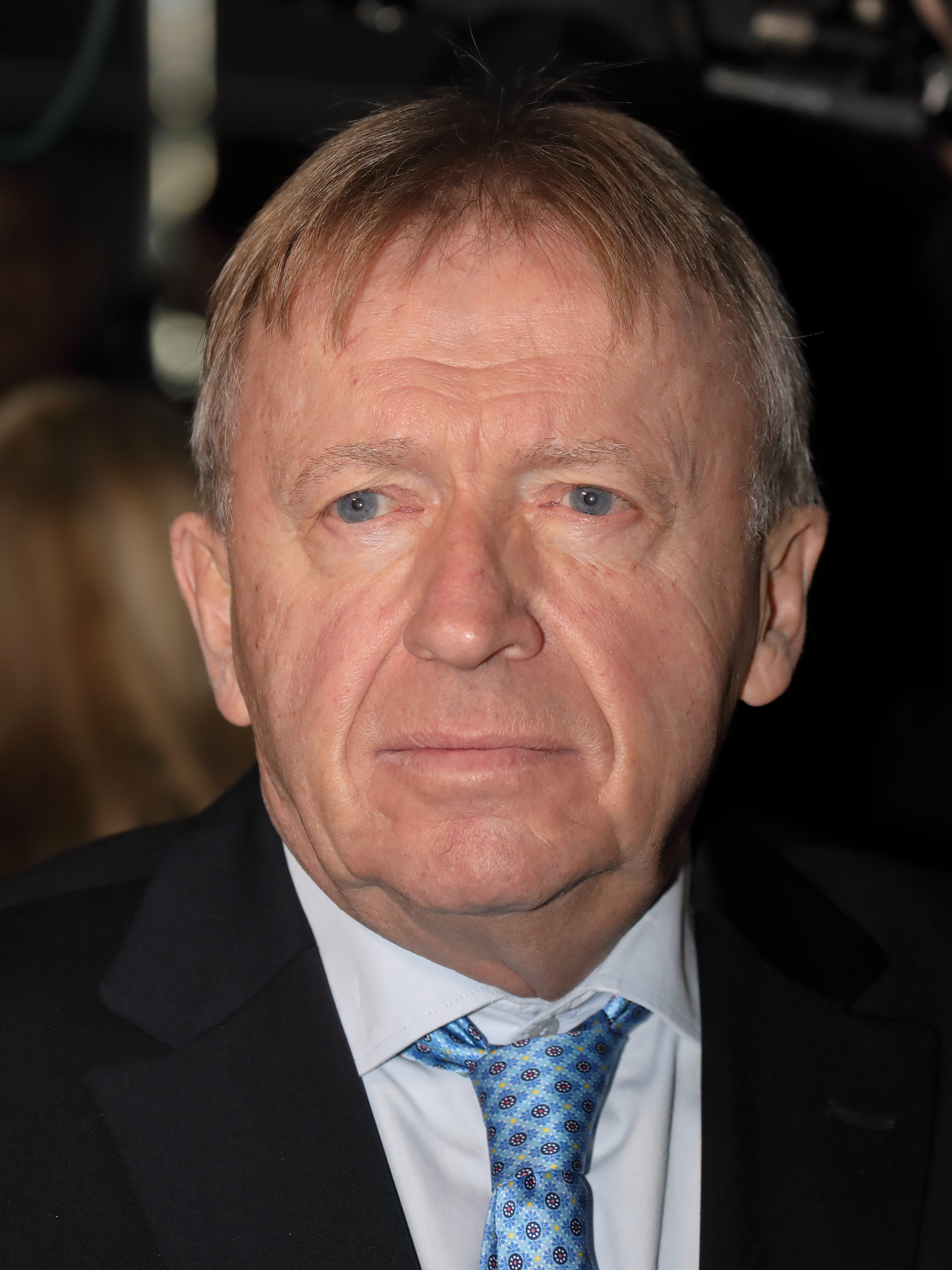
Hilmar Kabas

Hilmar Kabas (born 6 January 1942 in Vienna) is an Austrian politician of the Freedom Party of Austria (FPÖ).

Kabas studied law at the University of Vienna. He was mainly active as a local politician in Vienna and held the position of the state party leader between 1998 and 2004.

Preceded by Ursula Haubner	FPÖ Party Chairman (interim); 5–23 April 2005	Succeeded by Heinz-Christian Strache
