= Birgit Anette Olsen =

Danish linguist (born 1952)

- Born: 2 April 1952 (age 73)
- Occupations: linguist, Indo-Europeanist
- Spouse: Jens Elmegård Rasmussen (died 2013)

Birgit Anette Rasmussen (née Olsen; born 2 April 1952 in Denmark) is a Danish linguist, professor at the University of Copenhagen and leader of the Roots of Europe research center. She is an expert on Proto-Indo-European and Indo-European languages in general, especially derivational morphology and the history of Armenian. She has also published important articles on linguistic reconstruction and the history of Latin, Greek, Anatolian and Germanic languages. She was married to Jens Elmegård Rasmussen, and her official surname is Rasmussen, but as a linguist she uses her maiden name Olsen to avoid confusion in references.

== Selected publications ==
- 1988, The Proto-Indo-European Instrument Noun Suffix *-tlom and its Variants. Copenhagen: Royal Danish Academy of Sciences and Letters.
- 1992, "Latin -idus and the Indo-European Stative". In: Copenhagen Working Papers in Linguistics 2, pp. 1-12.
- 1999, The Noun in Biblical Armenian. Berlin/New York: Mouton de Gruyter.
- 2004, "The Complex of Nasal Stems in Indo-European". In J. Clackson & B.A. Olsen (eds.): Indo-European Word Formation – Proceedings of the Conference held at the University of Copenhagen, October 20th-22nd 2000, 215-248. Copenhagen: Museum Tusculanum.
- 2006, "Some formal peculiarities of Germanic n-stem Abstracts". In Karlene Jones-Bley (ed.): Proceedings of the Seventeenth Annual UCLA Indo-European Conference, Oct. 27-28, 2005. Washington, D.C.: Journal of Indo-European Studies monograph series 52, pp. 123-142.
- 2010, Derivation and composition: Two studies in Indo-European word formation. Innsbruck: Innsbrucker Beiträge zur Sprachwissenschaft.
- 2012, "Oldhøjtysk (ge)swio 'søsters mand' og germanske svogerskabsbetegnelser". In Erik W. Hansen, Alexandra Holsting & Hans Frede Nielsen (eds.): Ældre germansk sproghistorie. Odense: University of Southern Denmark, Mindre Skrifter Blaa Serie 29.
- 2014, "On the Role of Stative Markers in Indo-European Noun Formation". In N. Oettinger & T. Steer (eds.): Das Nomen im Indogermanischen: Morphologie, Substantiv versus Adjektiv, Kollektivum. Akten der Arbeitstagung der Indogermanischen Gesellschaft vom 14. bis 16. September in Erlangen, 261-272. Wiesbaden: Reichert.
