= Codices Ambrosiani =

Five biblical manuscripts

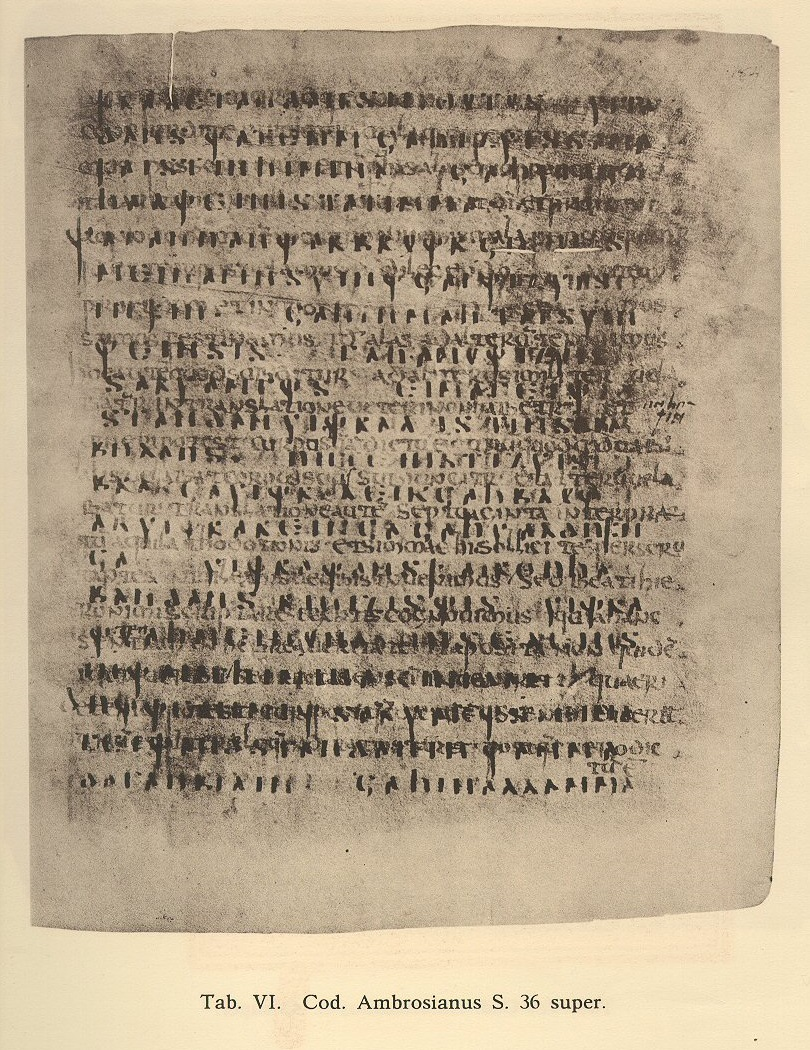
leaf of the Codex Ambrosianus B. Codex Ambrosianus S. 45 super

The Codices Ambrosiani A–E are five biblical manuscripts dating to the 6th–11th centuries CE. They reside in the Biblioteca Ambrosiana in Milan, as well as in Turin and Vatican City. They are written by different authors and use different alphabets. The codices A to D contain scattered passages from the Old Testament (Nehemiah) and the New Testament (including parts of the Gospels and the Epistles), whereas the codex E contains the commentaries known as Skeireins. The contents of the codices are rare survivals in the Gothic language.

== Contents ==
- Codex Ambrosianus A contains parts of the Epistles and the Gothic Calendar. It consists of 204 pages, of which 190 are legible, 2 are illegible and 12 are blank.
- Codex Ambrosianus B contains parts of the Epistles, including a complete text of 2 Corinthians, and consists of 156 pages, of which two are blank. B.21 is written in Syriac language and script. It is the basis of the Leiden Peshitta critical edition of the Peshitta Old Testament (Leiden siglum 7a1). Nominally dated to the 7th century, the consensus is that it is not older than the 6th century. It contains Apocrypha, 4 Ezra, 2 Baruch, 3 and 4 Maccabees, and a part of Josephus on the Maccabees.
- Codex Ambrosianus C consists of two leaves and contains fragments of chapters 25 to 27 of the Gospel of Matthew.
- Codex Ambrosianus D consists of fragments of the Book of Nehemiah.

== See also ==
- List of New Testament Latin manuscripts
- Codex Carolinus
