= Iceland in the Eurovision Song Contest 2001 =

- Eurovision Song Contest 2001
- Participating broadcaster: Ríkisútvarpið (RÚV)
- Country: Iceland
- Selection process: Söngvakeppni Sjónvarpsins 2001
- Selection date: 17 February 2001

Competing entry
- Song: "Angel"
- Artist: Two Tricky
- Songwriters: Einar Bárðarson; Magnús Þór Sigmundsson

Placement
- Final result: 22nd, 3 points

Participation chronology

Iceland was represented at the Eurovision Song Contest 2001 with the song "Angel", written by Einar Bárðarson and Magnús Þór Sigmundsson, and performed by the duo Two Tricky. The Icelandic participating broadcaster, Ríkisútvarpið (RÚV), selected its entry through Söngvakeppni Sjónvarpsins 2001. Eight songs competed in the selection which was held on 17 February 2001. "Birta" performed by Kristján Gíslason and Gunnar Ólason emerged as the winner exclusively through public televoting. The song was later translated from Icelandic to English for Eurovision and was titled "Angel", while the duo was renamed as Two Tricky.

Iceland competed in the Eurovision Song Contest which took place on 12 May 2001. Performing as the opening entry for the show in position 2, Iceland placed twenty-second (joint last) out of the 23 participating countries, scoring 3 points.

== Background ==
Prior to the 2001 Contest, Ríkisútvarpið (RÚV) had participated in the Eurovision Song Contest representing Iceland fourteen times since its first entry in 1986. Its best placing in the contest to this point was second, achieved in 1999 with the song "All Out of Luck" performed by Selma. In 2000, "Tell Me!" performed by August and Telma placed twelfth.

As part of its duties as participating broadcaster, RÚV organises the selection of its entry in the Eurovision Song Contest and broadcasts the event in the country. Between 1995 and 1999, the broadcaster opted to internally select its entry for the contest. In 2000, it used a national final to select its entry, a method that continued for its 2001 participation.

== Before Eurovision ==
=== Söngvakeppni Sjónvarpsins 2001 ===
Söngvakeppni Sjónvarpsins 2001 was the national final format developed by RÚV in order to select its entry for the Eurovision Song Contest 2001. On 26 October 2000, RÚV opened the submission period for interested songwriters to submit their entries until the deadline on 2 December 2000 and a selection committee was formed in order to select the top eight entries. The eight competing artists and songs were revealed by the broadcaster during the television programme Milli himins og jarðar, hosted by Steinunn Ólína Þorsteinsdóttir, between 20 January and 10 February 2001.

The national final took place on 17 February 2001 during Milli himins og jarðar where the winner, "Birta" performed Kristján Gíslason and Gunnar Ólason, was determined solely by televoting. Despite the initial announcement that the song would remain in Icelandic at the Eurovision Song Contest due to a new rule specifying that the winning entry was required to be performed in Icelandic at the contest, "Birta" was ultimately performed in English as "Angel" following protests from the Association of Composers (FTT) as well as from Kristján and Gunnar themselves.

Final – 17 February 2001
R/O	Artist	Song	Songwriter(s)	Televote	Place
1	Eyjólfur Kristjánsson and Birgitta Haukdal	"Aftur heim"	Eyjólfur Kristjánsson	831	7
2	Ruth Reginalds	"Enginn eins og þú"	Ingi Gunnar Jóhansson	2,402	2
3	Gúðrun Árný Karlsdóttir	"Komdu til mín"	Grétar Sigurbersson	1,127	6
4	Rúna G. Stefánsdóttir	"Í villtan dans"	Einar Oddsson	1,636	4
5	Ingunn Gylfadóttir	"Allt sem ég á"	Tómas Hermannsson, Ingunn Gylfadóttir	421	8
6	Páll Rósinkranz	"Min æskuást"	Grétar Sigurbergsson	1,270	5
7	Kristján Gíslason and Gunnar Ólason	"Birta"	Einar Bárðarson, Magnús Þór Sigmundsson	5,710	1
8	Margrét Kristín Sigurðardóttir	"Röddin þín"	Margrét Kristín Sigurðardóttir	2,156	3

== At Eurovision ==
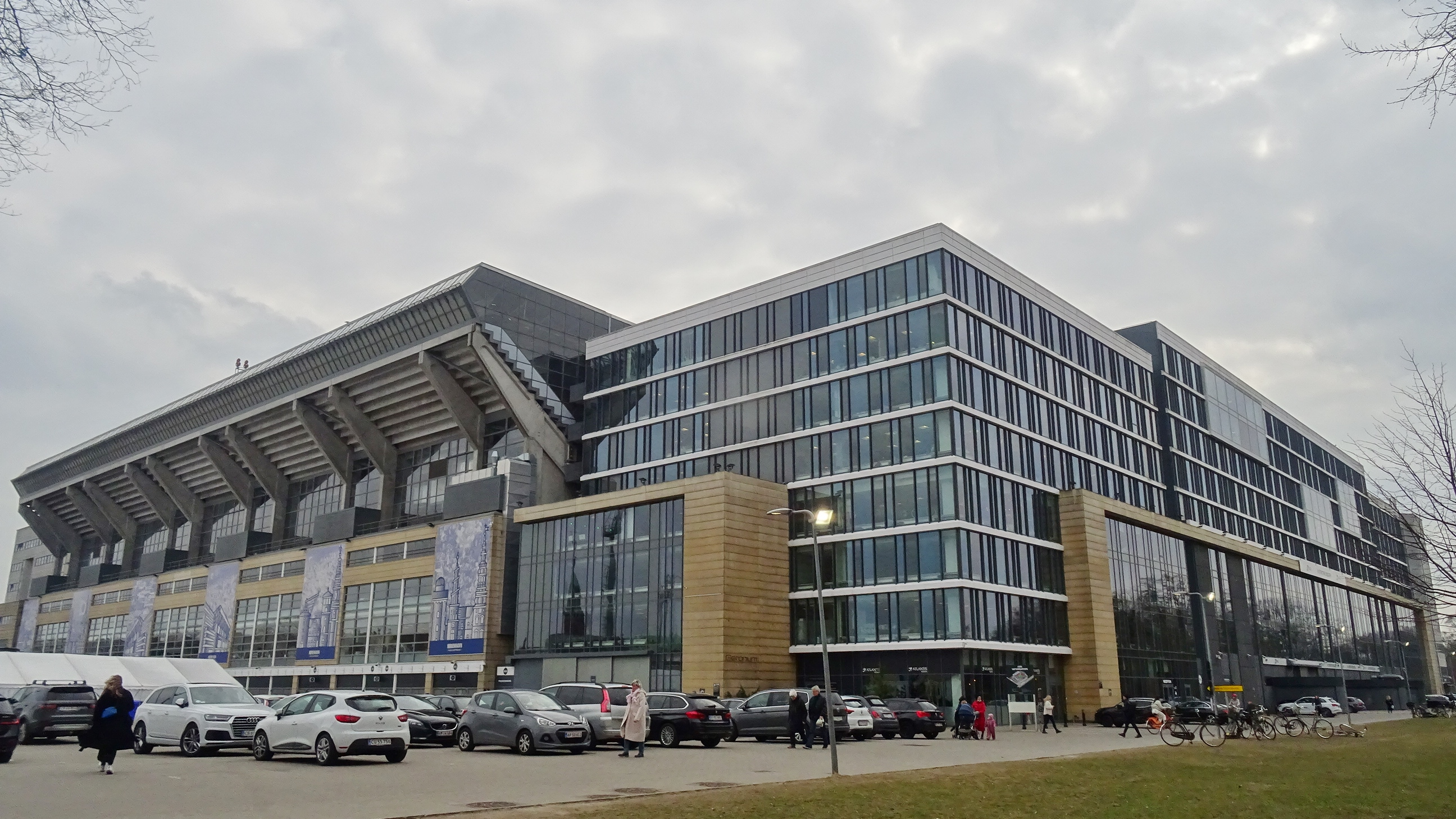
The Eurovision Song Contest 2001 took place at Parken Stadium in Copenhagen, Denmark.

The Eurovision Song Contest 2001 took place at Parken Stadium in Copenhagen, Denmark, on 12 May 2001. The relegation rules introduced for the 1997 contest were again utilised ahead of the 2001 contest, based on each country's average points total in previous contests. The 23 participants were made up of the host country, the "Big Four" (France, Germany, Spain and the United Kingdom), and the 12 countries with the highest average scores between the 1996 and 2000 contests competed in the final. On 9 November 2001, an allocation draw was held which determined the running order and Iceland was set to perform in position 2, following the entry from the Netherlands and before the entry from Bosnia and Herzegovina. Iceland finished in twenty-second (joint last) place with 3 points.

The contest was broadcast on Sjónvarpið, with commentary by Gísli Marteinn Baldursson.

=== Voting ===
Below is a breakdown of points awarded to Iceland and awarded by Iceland in the contest. The nation awarded its 12 points to Denmark in the contest.

RÚV appointed Eva María Jónsdóttir as its spokesperson to announce the results of the Icelandic televote during the show.

Points awarded to Iceland
Score	Country
12 points	
10 points	
8 points	
7 points	
6 points	
5 points	
4 points	
3 points	
2 points	Denmark
1 point	Norway

Points awarded by Iceland
Score	Country
12 points	Denmark
10 points	Estonia
8 points	Greece
7 points	Sweden
6 points	Slovenia
5 points	Russia
4 points	France
3 points	Malta
2 points	Spain
1 point	Lithuania
