= Tell Me! (August and Telma song) =

2000 song by August & Telma

Single by August & Telma
- B-side: "Segðu mér" (by Öggi); "Simple Man" (by Öggi)
- Released: 2000
- Length: 2:57
- Label: Skífan
- Composer: Örlygur Smári
- Lyricist: Sigurður Örn Jónsson

Eurovision Song Contest 2000 entry
- Country: Iceland
- Artists: Telma Ágústsdóttir, Einar Ágúst Víðisson
- As: August & Telma
- Language: English
- Composer: Örlygur Smári
- Lyricist: Sigurður Örn Jónsson

Finals performance
- Final result: 12th
- Final points: 45

Entry chronology
- ◄ "All Out of Luck" (1999)
- "Angel" (2001) ►

"Tell Me!" was the Icelandic entry in the Eurovision Song Contest 2000, performed in English by August & Telma. The song is an up-tempo duet, with the singers confessing their love for one another and planning to leave where they are in order to "be together all the time". "Tell Me!" was performed twelfth in the Eurovision Song Contest, following Cyprus' Voice with "Nomiza" and preceding Spain's Serafín Zubiri with "Colgado de un sueño". At the close of voting, it had received 45 points, placing 12th in a field of 24. The song was succeeded as Icelandic representative at the 2001 contest by Two Tricky with "Angel".

In Iceland, record label Skífan released "Tell Me!" as a CD single in 2000 backed with the B-sides "Segðu mér" and "Simple Man" by Örlygur Smári (credited as Öggi), who co-wrote "Tell Me!". The song received copious airplay in Iceland, topping the country's singles chart for two weeks in May 2000. It ended the year as Iceland's fifth-most-successful single.

== Icelandic version ==
The Icelandic version, titled "Hvert sem er" (translated as "Anywhere"), won Söngvakeppnin 2000 with 4318 teveloting votes, over three times more than the runner-up song "Söknuður" performed by Páll Rósinkranz. The Icelandic version was recorded but not released.

== Charts ==
=== Weekly charts ===
Chart (2000)	Peak position
Iceland (Íslenski Listinn Topp 40)	1

=== Year-end charts ===
Chart (2000)	Position
Iceland (Íslenski Listinn Topp 40)	5
