= Denmark in the Eurovision Song Contest 2000 =

- Eurovision Song Contest 2000
- Participating broadcaster: Danmarks Radio (DR)
- Country: Denmark
- Selection process: Dansk Melodi Grand Prix 2000
- Selection date: 19 February 2000

Competing entry
- Song: "Fly on the Wings of Love"
- Artist: Olsen Brothers
- Songwriter: Jørgen Olsen

Placement
- Final result: 1st, 195 points

Participation chronology

Denmark was represented at the Eurovision Song Contest 2000 with the song "Fly on the Wings of Love", written by Jørgen Olsen, and performed by the Olsen Brothers. The Danish participating broadcaster, DR, organised the national final Dansk Melodi Grand Prix 2000 in order to select its entry for the contest. Ten songs competed in a televised show where "Smuk som et stjerneskud" performed by the Olsen Brothers was the winner as decided upon through two rounds of jury voting and public voting. The song was later translated from Danish to English for Eurovision and was titled "Fly on the Wings of Love". The entry eventually won the contest.

Denmark competed in the Eurovision Song Contest which took place on 13 May 2000. Performing during the show in position 14, Denmark placed first out of the 24 participating countries, winning the contest with 195 points. This was Denmark's second win in the Eurovision Song Contest; their first victory was in 1963.

== Background ==
Prior to the 2000 contest, DR had participated in the Eurovision Song Contest representing Denmark twenty-nine times since its first entry in 1957. It had won the contest, to this point, on one occasion: in 1963 with the song "Dansevise" performed by Grethe and Jørgen Ingmann.

As part of its duties as participating broadcaster, DR organises the selection of its entry in the Eurovision Song Contest and broadcasts the event in the country. The broadcaster organised the Dansk Melodi Grand Prix 2000 national final in order to select its entry for the 2000 contest; the broadcaster has selected all but one of their Eurovision entries through Dansk Melodi Grand Prix.

== Before Eurovision ==
=== Dansk Melodi Grand Prix 2000 ===
Dansk Melodi Grand Prix 2000 was the 31st edition of Dansk Melodi Grand Prix, the music competition organised by DR to select its entry for the Eurovision Song Contest. The event was held on 19 February 2000 at the Cirkusbygningen in Copenhagen, hosted by Natasja Crone Back and Michael Carøe and televised on DR1. The program was produced by Jørn Fabricius, with the set being designed by Birger Christensen. The national final was watched by 1.356 million viewers in Denmark, making it the most popular show of the week in the country.

==== Format ====
Ten songs competed in one show where the winner was determined over two rounds of voting. In the first round, the top five songs based on the combination of votes from a public televote and a seven-member jury panel qualified to the superfinal. In the superfinal, the winner was determined again by the votes of the jury and public.

The seven-member jury panel was composed of:

- Charlotte Nilsson – Swedish singer and television host, who won Eurovision for Sweden in 1999
- Michael Teschl – singer and composer, represented Denmark in 1999
- Bjørn Tidmand – singer, represented Denmark in 1964
- Marie Carmen Koppel – singer
- Richard Herrey – Swedish singer, radio host and television producer, who won Eurovision for Sweden in 1984 as part of Herreys
- Christian Ingebrigtsen – Norwegian singer-songwriter
- Lecia Jønsson – singer

==== Competing entries ====
DR received 100 entries from composers invited for the competition. A selection committee selected ten songs from the entries submitted to the broadcaster, while the artists of the selected entries were chosen by DR in consultation with their composers. The competing songs were announced on 13 December 1999 with their artists being announced on 14 January 2000. Among the artists were Gry Johansen who represented Denmark in 1983, and Fenders which represented Denmark in 1987 as part of Bandjo.

Participating entries
Artist	Song	Composer	Lyricist
Aida Lohmann	"Mayday Mayday"	Ivar Lind Greiner	Iben Plesner
Charlotte Vigel	"Hva' så med mig?"	Rasmus Schwenger	
Fenders	"Lov mig du bli'r her"	Jørn Hansen	Kristian Løhde
Gry Johansen	"Sig du vil ha' mig"	Per Meilstrup	Gry Johansen
Johnny Jørgensen	"Den drømmende by"	Morten Kærså	Hans Henrik Koltze
Lotte Lisby	"Julian"	Jan Lysdahl; Jan Klausen	
Ole Skovhøj	"Stjernen der viser vej"	Jan Parber	Jes Kerstein
Jørgen and Niels Olsen	"Smuk som et stjerneskud"	Jørgen Olsen	
Sanne Gottlieb	"Uden dig"	Lise Cabble; Mette Mathiesen	Lise Cabble
Trine Gadeberg	"Lykkefugl"	Helge Engelbrecht	

==== Final ====
The final took place on 19 February 2000. In the first round of voting the top five advanced to the superfinal based on the votes of a public televote (4/5) and a seven-member jury (1/5). In the superfinal, the winner, "Smuk som et stjerneskud" performed by Jørgen and Niels Olsen, was selected by the public and jury vote. The jury voting results along with the voting results of each of Denmark's four regions in the superfinal were converted to points which were each distributed as follows: 4, 6, 8, 10 and 12 points.

The trophy awarded to the winners was presented at the end of the broadcast by the reigning Eurovision winner Charlotte Nilsson.

Final – 19 February 2000
R/O	Artist	Song	Result
1	Jørgen and Niels Olsen	"Smuk som et stjerneskud"	Advanced
2	Trine Gadeberg	"Lykkefugl"	Advanced
3	Charlotte Vigel	"Hva' så med mig?"	—N/a
4	Johnny Jørgensen	"Den drømmende by"	—N/a
5	Lotte Lisby	"Julian"	—N/a
6	Fenders	"Lov mig du bli'r her"	—N/a
7	Aida Lohmann	"Mayday Mayday"	Advanced
8	Gry Johansen	"Sig du vil ha' mig"	—N/a
9	Ole Skovhøj	"Stjernen der viser vej"	Advanced
10	Sanne Gottlieb	"Uden dig"	Advanced

Superfinal – 19 February 2000
R/O	Artist	Song	Jury	Public	Total	Place
1	Jørgen and Niels Olsen	"Smuk som et stjerneskud"	10	48	58	1
2	Trine Gadeberg	"Lykkefugl"	6	16	22	5
3	Aida Lohmann	"Mayday Mayday"	4	34	38	4
4	Ole Skovhøj	"Stjernen der viser vej"	12	30	42	2
5	Sanne Gottlieb	"Uden dig"	8	32	40	3

Detailed Regional Televoting Results
Song	Jutland	Funen	Zealand and Islands	Capital Region	Total
"Smuk som et stjerneskud"	12	12	12	12	48
"Lykkefugl"	4	4	4	4	16
"Mayday, Mayday"	10	6	10	8	34
"Stjernen der viser vej"	8	10	6	6	30
"Uden dig"	6	8	8	10	32

== At Eurovision ==
According to Eurovision rules, all nations with the exceptions of the bottom six countries in the 1999 contest competed in the final on 13 May 2000. An allocation draw was held which determined the running order and Denmark was set to perform in position 14, following the entry from Spain and before the entry from Germany. At the contest, the Olsen Brothers performed the English version of "Smuk som et stjerneskud", titled "Fly on the Wings of Love". Denmark won the contest placing first with a score of 195 points. This was Denmark's second victory in the Eurovision Song Contest; their first victory was in 1963.

The show was broadcast on DR1 with commentary by Keld Heick. The contest was watched by a total of 1.4 million viewers in Denmark.

=== Voting ===
Below is a breakdown of points awarded to Denmark and awarded by Denmark in the contest. The nation awarded its 12 points to Iceland in the contest.

DR appointed Michael Teschl, who represented Denmark in 1999, as its spokesperson to announce the Danish votes during the show.

Points awarded to Denmark
Score	Country
12 points	Germany; Iceland; Ireland; Israel; Latvia; Russia; Sweden; United Kingdom
10 points	Austria; Belgium; Finland; Netherlands; Norway; Spain; Switzerland
8 points	Estonia; Malta
7 points	France
6 points	
5 points	
4 points	Cyprus
3 points	
2 points	
1 point	Romania; Turkey

Points awarded by Denmark
Score	Country
12 points	Iceland
10 points	Sweden
8 points	Latvia
7 points	Norway
6 points	Russia
5 points	Ireland
4 points	Estonia
3 points	Malta
2 points	Germany
1 point	Turkey

== Congratulations: 50 Years of the Eurovision Song Contest ==
In 2005, "Fly on the Wings of Love" was one of fourteen songs chosen by Eurovision fans and an EBU reference group to participate in the Congratulations anniversary competition. Although it was the only Danish entry featured, Denmark were central to the special, as it was hosted at Forum Copenhagen by the Danish national broadcaster. Numerous Danish acts appeared both during the show and in the clip montages (which all received notably louder applause from the Danish crowd than the other acts). The special was broadcast live on DR with Nicolai Molbech providing Danish-language commentary.

"Fly on the Wings of Love" appeared eighth in the running order, following "Waterloo" by ABBA and preceding "Poupée de cire, poupée de son" by France Gall. Like the majority of entries that night, the performance was mostly by a group of dancers alongside footage of the Olsen Brothers' Eurovision performance, with the duo themselves appearing to lip-sync along with the final verse (they would later re-appear to perform a Eurovision-themed version of their song "Walk Right Back" alongside Linda Martin, Eimear Quinn, Charlie McGettigan, and Jakob Sveistrup, who were appearing as backing singers; the Brothers performed the original version during the opening of the 2001 contest). At the end of the first round, "Fly on the Wings of Love" was not one of the five entries announced as proceeding to the second round. It was later revealed that the song finished sixth with 111 points, thereby making it the closest non-qualifier to reaching the second round. In both the first and second round, in spite of having the opportunity to vote for their own entry, Denmark awarded twelve points to neighboring Sweden and ABBA's "Waterloo," which wound up winning. They awarded their own entry ten points, although fellow Nordic nation Iceland gave it their twelve points.

=== Voting ===
Points awarded to "Fly on the Wings of Love" (Round 1)
Score	Country
12 points	Iceland
10 points	Denmark; Latvia; Lithuania
8 points	Norway; Sweden
7 points	Ireland; Malta
6 points	Croatia; Germany
5 points	Austria
4 points	Slovenia
3 points	Andorra; Poland; Russia; Switzerland
2 points	Macedonia; Monaco
1 point	Belgium; Romania
