= Orkun Yazgan =

Turkish TV presenter and musician

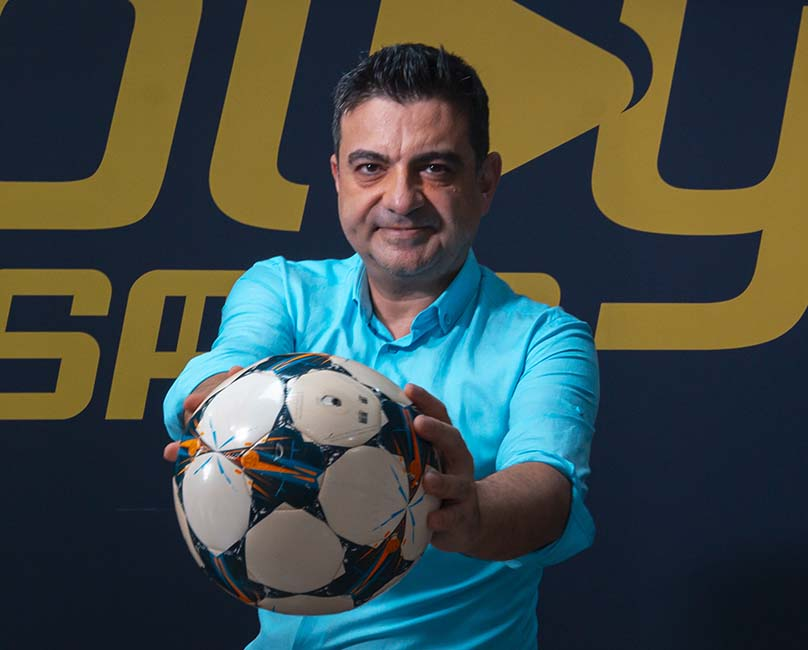
- 2020,
- Born: 1970 (age 55–56); Ankara, Turkey
- Occupations: TV presenter, musician

Orkun Yazgan (born 1970) is a Turkish TV presenter and musician.

== Biography ==
Yazgan completed his education at the Galatasaray High School and graduated from Middle East Technical University, Faculty of Economics and Administrative Sciences. He started his career as a presenter in NTV's news section, and later transferred to ATV. He later presented the morning program Yeni Gün on CNN Türk together with Ece Üner. In 2009, he started working as the media coordinator for Fenerbahçe and presented the program Samandıra Saati on Radio Fenerbahçe.

Yazgan, who is also a musician, represented Turkey at the Eurovision Song Contest 2000, which took place in Stockholm, Sweden, and performed the song "Yorgunum Anla" as member of the Group SOS (Sühan Ayhan-Orkun Yazgan-Selim Öncel) together with Pınar Ayhan.

Yazgan is married to İrem Selamoğlu and the couple have two daughters named Melodi and Mimoza.
