= Turkey in the Eurovision Song Contest 2000 =

- Eurovision Song Contest 2000
- Participating broadcaster: Turkish Radio and Television Corporation (TRT)
- Country: Turkey
- Selection process: 23. Eurovision Şarkı Yarışması Türkiye Finali
- Selection date: 18 February 2000

Competing entry
- Song: "Yorgunum Anla"
- Artist: Pınar and the S.O.S.
- Songwriters: Sühan Ayhan; Pınar Ayhan; Orkun Yazgan

Placement
- Final result: 10th, 59 points

Participation chronology

Turkey was represented at the Eurovision Song Contest 2000 with the song "Yorgunum Anla", composed by Sühan Ayhan, with lyrics by Pınar Ayhan and Orkun Yazgan, and performed by Pınar and Grup S.O.S. The Turkish participating broadcaster, the Turkish Radio and Television Corporation (TRT), selected its entry through a national final. Although the song was originally in Turkish, it was sung partially in English in Eurovision.

== Before Eurovision ==
=== 23. Eurovision Şarkı Yarışması Türkiye Finali ===
The Turkish Radio and Television Corporation (TRT) held the national final on 18 February 2000 at the Ari television studios in Ankara, hosted by Yasemin Pamukçu and Ömer Önder. Ten songs competed and the winner was determined by an expert jury.

Final – 18 February 2000
R/O	Artist	Song	Lyricist	Composer	Place
1	Sibel Mirkelam	"Duy Beni"	Selim Korkmaz	Selim Korkmaz	—
2	Pınar Ayhan & Grup S.O.S.	"Yorgunum Anla"	Pınar Ayhan, Orkun Yazgan	Sühan Ayhan	1
3	Işın Karaca	"Bir Kırık Sevda"	Günay Çoban	Aslıgül Ayas	2
4	Semra Sarpkaya	"Aşkımız Bir Masal"	Müge Baysal	Tolga Gürdil	—
5	Feryal Başel	"Son Defa"	İhsan Köseoğlu	İhsan Köseoğlu	—
6	Semih Bayraktar	"Bu Aşk Yasak Bana"	Semih Bayraktar	Semih Bayraktar	—
7	Ayça Dönmez	"Bak Rüzgarlara"	Bahadır Şahin	Can Atilla	—
8	Feryal Başel	"Sana"	Ebru Ekşi Köseoğlu	İhsan Köseoğlu	—
9	Semih Bayraktar & Grup Avrasya	"Aşık Oldum"	Devrim Aydın	Umut Erdoğan	—
10	Zeliha Sunal	"Yarım Kalan Senfoni"	Müge Baysal	Tolga Gürdil	—

== At Eurovision ==
On the evening of the contest Pınar Ayhan and Grup S.O.S. performed 22nd in the running order following Latvia and preceding Ireland. At the close of the voting "Yorgunum Anla" had received 59 points, placing Turkey 10th out of 24 competing countries. The Turkish jury awarded its 12 points to Sweden.

=== Voting ===
Points awarded to Turkey
Score	Country
12 points	France; Netherlands
10 points	Germany
8 points	
7 points	
6 points	
5 points	Austria; Macedonia; Switzerland
4 points	Finland
3 points	Belgium
2 points	
1 point	Denmark; Norway; Sweden

Points awarded by Turkey
Score	Country
12 points	Sweden
10 points	Norway
8 points	Croatia
7 points	Ireland
6 points	United Kingdom
5 points	Malta
4 points	Austria
3 points	Netherlands
2 points	Estonia
1 point	Denmark
