= Ece Üner =

Turkish TV presenter and news anchor (born 1981)

- Born: Özge Ece Üner; 21 July 1981 (age 44); Istanbul, Turkey
- Occupation(s): TV presenter, news anchor
- Spouse: Deniz Bayramoğlu (m. 2013)
- Children: 1

Özge Ece Üner (born 21 July 1981) is a Turkish TV presenter and news anchor. She works as the main news bulletin presenter on Halk TV.

== Life and career ==
Üner was born on 21 July 1981 in Istanbul. She is the daughter of Dinç Üner, who was the general manager of CNN Türk for a period. Her mother is Ayşe Meral Üner, a Macedonian immigrant. After finishing her studies at Koç School, she enrolled in Koç University School of Sociology and History and graduated in 2003. She studied French at Paris-Sorbonne University and took courses on the European Union in Brussels. She eventually got a degree in television presenting and finished first in her class.

Üner started her career in the Sociology Department of Koç University in 1999 as an intern. During the 2003 Iraq War she worked as a reporter for NTV News Center. From 2002 to 2006, she was involved in reporting on diplomatic and economic news for NTV. She interviewed and reported on a number of politicians and statesmen, including Iran and Israel parliament speakers, Iran interior minister, Czech Republic's president, US Department of Defense adviser Richard Perle, Bill Clinton's adviser Richard Holbrooke, US Ambassadors to Turkey, as well as British, Russian, French and German ministers of state. Besides politics, she made news from the Formula 1 races in Bahrain. She was awarded a plaque for her contribution as a journalist to the Formula 1 Grand Prix held in Istanbul in August 2005. In early 2006, she left NTV and began working as a reporter for Star TV for a short period. In May 2006, she joined CNN Türk's sports department and presented sports news on weekends. In March 2007, together with Orkun Yazgan she began presenting the program Yeni Gün on CNN Türk. In August 2009, she started working for Habertürk TV. In 2010, she presented the discussion program Olduğu Gibi and the next year she was left in charge of the news program Akşam Raporu. From 2012 to 2017, she presented the discussion program Enine Boyuna on Habertürk TV. On 6 January 2014, she became the main news bulletin presenter on Show TV, a position she held until 5 June 2015 when she was replaced by Jülide Ateş. After Ateş's resignation from her position, Üner returned to her previous position on Show TV on 8 January 2018.

== Employers ==
Year	Channel
2002-2006	NTV
2006	Star TV
2006-2009	CNN Türk
2009-2018	Habertürk TV
2014-2015, 2018-2021	Show TV
2021	Kanal D
2023-2024	TV100
2024	Sözcü TV
2024-present	Halk TV

== Awards ==
Year	Award	Category	Result
2020	46th Golden Butterfly Awards	Best Female News Presenter	Won
