= Macedonia in the Eurovision Song Contest 2000 =

- Eurovision Song Contest 2000
- Participating broadcaster: Macedonian Radio Television (MRT)
- Country: Macedonia
- Selection process: Skopje Fest 2000
- Selection date: 19 February 2000

Competing entry
- Song: "100% te ljubam"
- Artist: XXL
- Songwriters: Dragan Karanfilovski; Orče Zafirovski; Vlado Janevski

Placement
- Final result: 15th, 29 points

Participation chronology

Macedonia (Note: Officially under the provisional appellation "former Yugoslav Republic of Macedonia", abbreviated "FYR Macedonia".) was represented at the Eurovision Song Contest 2000 with the song "100% te ljubam" (100% те љубам), written by Dragan Karanfilovski, Orče Zafirovski, and Vlado Janevski, and performed by the group XXL. The Macedonian participating broadcaster, Macedonian Radio Television (MRT), organised the national final Skopje Fest 2000 to select its entry for the contest. Twenty-two entries competed in the national final on 19 February 2000 and "100% te ljubam" performed by XXL was selected as the winner following the combination of votes from a 21-member jury panel, an audience vote and a public televote.

Macedonia competed in the Eurovision Song Contest which took place on 13 May 2000. Performing during the show in position 19, Macedonia placed fifteenth out of the 24 participating countries, scoring 29 points.

== Background ==
Prior to the 2000 contest, Macedonian Radio Television (MRT) had participated in the Eurovision Song Contest once in 1998, having placed nineteenth with the song "Ne zori, zoro" performed by Vlado Janevski. As part of its duties as participating broadcaster, MRT organises the selection of its entry in the Eurovision Song Contest and broadcasts the event in the country. For the 2000 contest, the broadcaster opted to select its entry by using the national final Skopje Fest.

== Before Eurovision ==
=== Skopje Fest 2000 ===
MRT used the 2000 edition of the Skopje Fest song contest to select its entry for the Eurovision Song Contest 2000. A submission period was opened for interested composers to submit their songs and MRT received 168 submissions at the closing of the deadline. Twenty-two competing songs were selected in early November 1999 by a nine-member committee and their performers were selected by the contest's artistic director Petar Georgievski and executive producer Nikola Dimuševski.

Skopje Fest 2000 took place on 19 February 2000 at the Universal Hall in Skopje, hosted by Katerina Krstevska and Dragan B. Kostić and broadcast on MTV 1. The twenty-two entries competed and a combination of public televoting, votes from the audience in the venue and a 21-member jury panel selected the winner. Each member of the jury awarded 100 points to their favourite song, while each member of the audience awarded one point to their favourite song, and the televoting results were converted to points with 200 points awarded to the favourite, 180 points awarded to the second favourite and so on. After all the points were combined, "100% te ljubam" performed by XXL was announced as the winner, receiving 1,300 points from the jury, 288 points from the audience, and 180 points from the televote with about 30,000 votes. Toše Proeski won the televote with about 38,000 votes.

Final – 19 February 2000
R/O	Artist	Song	Songwriter(s)	Points	Place
1	Ivana Andonovska	"Nov den" (Нов ден)	Ivana Andonovska	12	17
2	Mama	"Doždot pagja" (Дождот паѓа)	Trajče Organdžiev, Tanja Trčkova	31	14
3	Verica Pandilovska	"Znaeš deka znam" (Знаеш дека знам)	Toše Pop-Simonov	119	7
4	Klik Klak	"Samo ljubi me" (Само љуби ме)	Vesna Malinova, Jovica Karallievski	9	18
5	Erzana	"Iluzija" (Илузија)	Klementina Krstanovska, Erzana Beriša	111	8
6	Risto Samardžiev	"Kade što denot boite gi sokriva" (Каде што денот боите ги сокрива)	Risto Samardžiev, Hari Kotlarovski	248	4
7	Lidija Kočovska	"Samo tvoja sum" (Само твоjа сум)	Igor Cvetkovski	2	20
8	Marjan Stojanoski	"Dali ti si ova nebo" (Дали ти си ова небо)	Petar Georgiev-Kalica	54	12
9	Jasmina Mukaetova	"Dali si osamen" (Дали си осамен)	Ano Josifov, Ristanka Pečova	0	22
10	XXL	"100% te ljubam" (100% те љубам)	Orče Zafirovski, Dragan Karanfilovski, Vlado Janevski	1,768	1
11	P.S.	"Kaži što kјe napraviš" (Кажи што ќе направиш)	Aneta Kačurkova, Dimitar Dimitrov	20	16
12	Džina Papas Džoksi	"Zaboravi" (Заборави)	Ana Genčovska, Džina Papas Džoksi	2	20
13	Maja Vukičević	"Nemoj da si naiven" (Немоj да си наивен)	Toše Pop-Simonov	5	19
14	Area	"Ti bi sakal" (Ти би сакал)	Ružica Milošeska-Brčioska, Ivica Brčioski	93	9
15	Andrijana Janevska	"Tvoeto pismo moja biblija" (Твоето писмо моjа библиjа)	Vlado Janevski, Grigor Koprov	163	6
16	Tanja Angelova	"Slušni me" (Слушни ме)	Ivo Nastevski	27	15
17	Karolina Gočeva	"Za nas" (За нас)	Aleksandar Ristovski, Darko Dimitrov	916	2
18	Magija	"Dali se ušte si moja" (Дали се уште си моjа)	Jovan Jovanov	195	5
19	Elena Petreska	"Svetlina" (Светлина)	Orče Bozzinovski, Elena Petreska	71	11
20	Toše Proeski	"Solzi pravat zlaten prsten" (Солзи прават златен прстен)	Ognen Nedelkovski, Grigor Koprov	395	3
21	Dani	"A nekogaš" (А некогаш)	Vesna Dodeva, Ljupčo Mirkovski	81	10
22	Pece Ognenov	"Sakav da sum edinstven" (Сакав да сум единствен)	Hari Kotlarovski	40	13

== At Eurovision ==
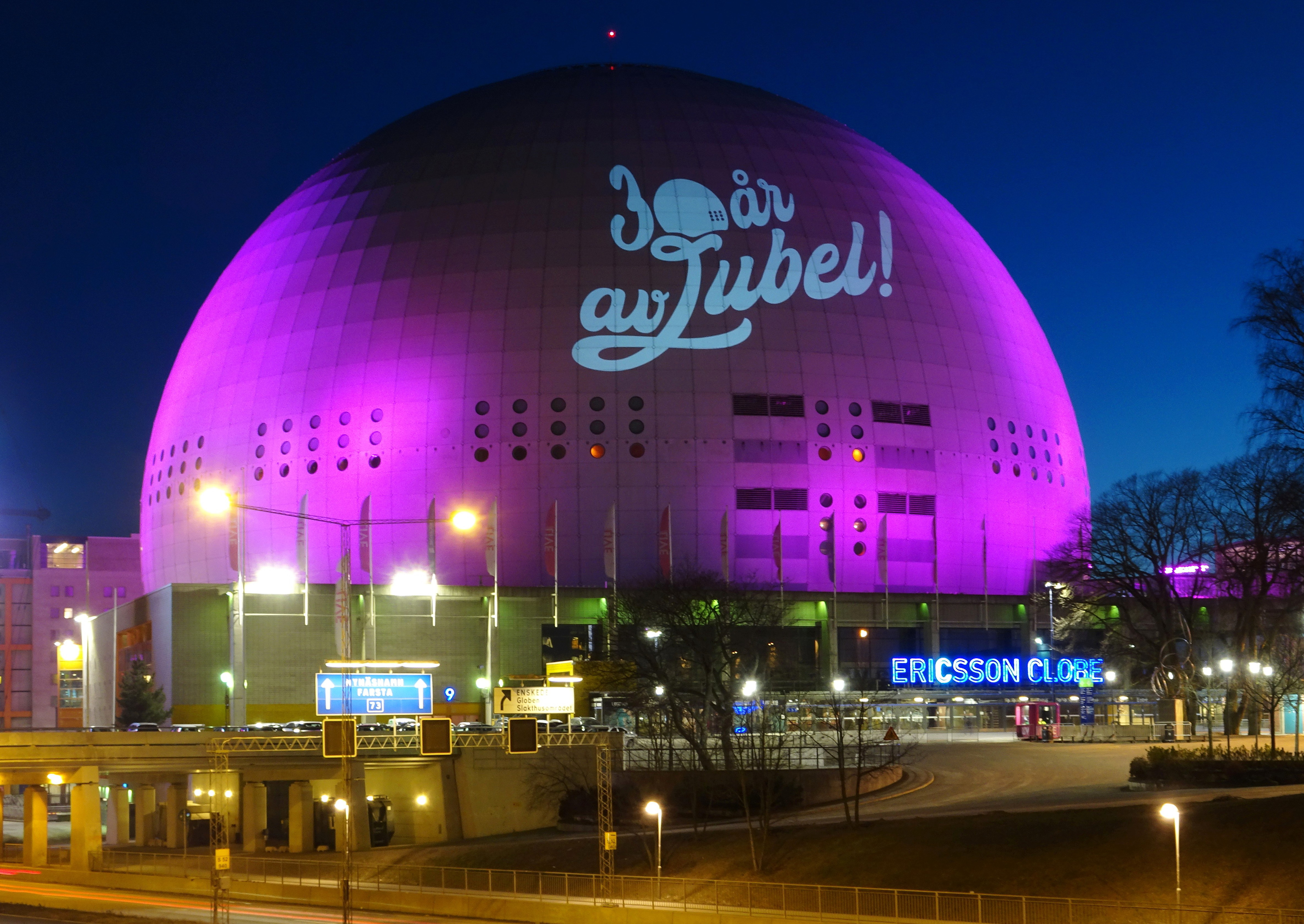
The Eurovision Song Contest 2000 took place at the Globe Arena in Stockholm, Sweden, on 13 May 2000.

The Eurovision Song Contest 2000 took place at Globe Arena in Stockholm, Sweden, on 13 May 2000. According to Eurovision rules, the participants list included the previous year's winning country, the "Big Four" countries (France, Germany, Spain, and the United Kingdom), the countries with the highest average scores between the 1995 and 1999 contests, and any countries which had not competed in the previous contest. Macedonia did not compete in the 1999 contest and thus were permitted to participate. On 21 November 1999, an allocation draw was held which determined the running order and Macedonia was set to perform in position 19, following the entry from the Sweden and before the entry from Finland. Macedonia finished in fifteenth place with 29 points.

=== Voting ===
Below is a breakdown of points awarded to Macedonia and awarded by Macedonia in the contest. The nation awarded its 12 points to Romania in the contest.

MRT, which broadcast the contest in Macedonia, appointed Sandra Todorovska as its spokesperson to announce the results of the Macedonian jury during the show.

Points awarded to Macedonia
Score	Country
12 points	
10 points	Croatia; Romania
8 points	
7 points	Russia
6 points	
5 points	
4 points	
3 points	
2 points	Cyprus
1 point	

Points awarded by Macedonia
Score	Country
12 points	Romania
10 points	Croatia
8 points	Malta
7 points	Russia
6 points	Sweden
5 points	Turkey
4 points	Cyprus
3 points	Latvia
2 points	Belgium
1 point	Israel
