= Belgium in the Eurovision Song Contest 2000 =

- Eurovision Song Contest 2000
- Participating broadcaster: Radio-télévision belge de la Communauté française (RTBF)
- Country: Belgium
- Selection process: Finale Nationale Concours Eurovision de la Chanson 2000
- Selection date: 18 February 2000

Competing entry
- Song: "Envie de vivre"
- Artist: Nathalie Sorce
- Songwriter: Silvio Pezzuto

Placement
- Final result: 24th, 2 points

Participation chronology

Belgium was represented at the Eurovision Song Contest 2000 with the song "Envie de vivre" written by Silvio Pezzuto, and performed by Nathalie Sorce. The Belgian participating broadcaster, Walloon Radio-télévision belge de la Communauté française (RTBF), selected its entry for the contest through the national final Finale Nationale Concours Eurovision de la Chanson 2000. In the national final on 18 February 2000 which featured ten competing entries, "Envie de vivre" performed by Nathalie Sorce was selected as the winner solely by public televoting.

Belgium competed in the Eurovision Song Contest which took place on 13 May 2000. Performing during the show in position 10, Belgium placed twenty-fourth (last) out of the 24 participating countries, scoring two points.

== Background ==
Prior to the 2000 contest, Belgium had participated in the Eurovision Song Contest forty-two times since its debut as one of seven countries to take part in 1956. Since then, they have won the contest on one occasion in 1986 with the song "J'aime la vie", performed by Sandra Kim. In 1999, "Like the Wind" performed by Vanessa Chinitor placed twelfth.

The Belgian participation in the contest alternates between two broadcasters: Flemish Vlaamse Radio- en Televisieomroeporganisatie (VRT) and Walloon Radio-télévision belge de la Communauté française (RTBF) at the time, with both broadcasters sharing the broadcasting rights. Both broadcasters –and their predecessors– had selected the Belgian entry using national finals and internal selections in the past. RTBF had the turn to participate in 2000. In 1999 and 1998, both VRT and RTBF organised a national final to select the Belgian entry. On 28 June 1999, RTBF confirmed its participation in the 2000 contest and held a national final to select its entry.

== Before Eurovision ==
=== Finale Nationale Concours Eurovision de la Chanson 2000 ===
Finale Nationale Concours Eurovision de la Chanson 2000 was the national final organised by RTBF to select its entry in the Eurovision Song Contest 2000. 145 entries were received for the competition following a submission period which was opened on 25 September 1999, from which ten acts were selected by RTBF and announced on 6 January 2000. The national final was broadcast live on RTBF La Une at 20:45 CET on 18 February 2000 in the RTBF Studio 6 in Brussels, and was hosted by Jean-Pierre Hautier. The winner, "Envie de vivre" performed by Nathalie Sorce, was selected solely by public televoting with the results being revealed by Belgium's six regions: four provinces in Wallonia with votes from Namur and Luxembourg being combined, a "Rest of Belgium" region made up of votes from Flanders, and Brussels.

After the final, there was initially some degree of uncertainty about the disproportionately high number of votes to Sabrina Klinkenberg from the province of Liège, but RTBF subsequently confirmed that it was correct, citing the fact that Klinkenberg was a native of that province as the most probable explanation, and pointing out that Sorce had also received an exceptionally high number of votes from her home province of Hainaut.

Final – 18 February 2000
R/O	Artist	Song	Songwriter(s)	Votes	Place
1	Maria Canel	"Et si..."	Maria Canel Ferreiro, Patrice de Matos de Morais	2,518	10
2	Géraldine Cozier	"Ma voie"	Geraldine Cozier, Cécile Delamarre, Pascal Noel, Philippe Libois	8,371	5
3	Gerlando	"Rêve"	Fernando de Meersman, Hughes Maréchal	4,002	9
4	Sabrina Klinkenberg	"Tout ce que je suis"	Alexis Vanderheyden, Jacques Broun	11,085	3
5	La Teuf	"Soldat de l'amour"	Alec Mansion	6,216	6
6	Mezzo Mezzo	"Belgicanos"	Silvio Pezzuto, Michel Ianiri, Juan Gonzalez	10,750	4
7	Christel Pagnoul	"Pour la vie"	Francis Goya, Ralph Benatar, Christel Pagnoul, Valérie Weyer	6,066	7
8	Frédéric Reynaerts	"Le nomade m'a dit"	Frédéric Reynaerts	17,774	2
9	Nathalie Sorce	"Envie de vivre"	Silvio Pezzuto	21,362	1
10	Triana	"Donne"	Roberto D'Angelo, Filippo di Maira	5,270	8

Detailed Regional Televoting Results
R/O	Song	Walloon Brabant	Hainaut	Namur and Luxembourg	Liège	Rest of Belgium	Brussels	Total
1	"Et si..."	163	63	142	68	48	2,035	2,518
2	"Ma voie"	368	2,042	2,782	1,072	228	1,879	8,371
3	"Rêve"	103	1,313	263	360	563	1,427	4,002
4	"Tout ce que je suis"	292	809	393	7,906	114	1,571	11,085
5	"Soldat de l'amour"	290	727	731	1,489	146	2,833	6,216
6	"Belgicanos"	424	3,962	848	1,109	497	3,910	10,750
7	"Pour la vie"	340	681	221	742	456	3,626	6,066
8	"Le nomade m'a dit"	956	2,497	1,988	3,137	2,225	6,971	17,774
9	"Envie de vivre"	910	8,305	2,243	3,360	950	5,594	21,362
10	"Donne"	91	629	211	3,361	47	931	5,270

== At Eurovision ==
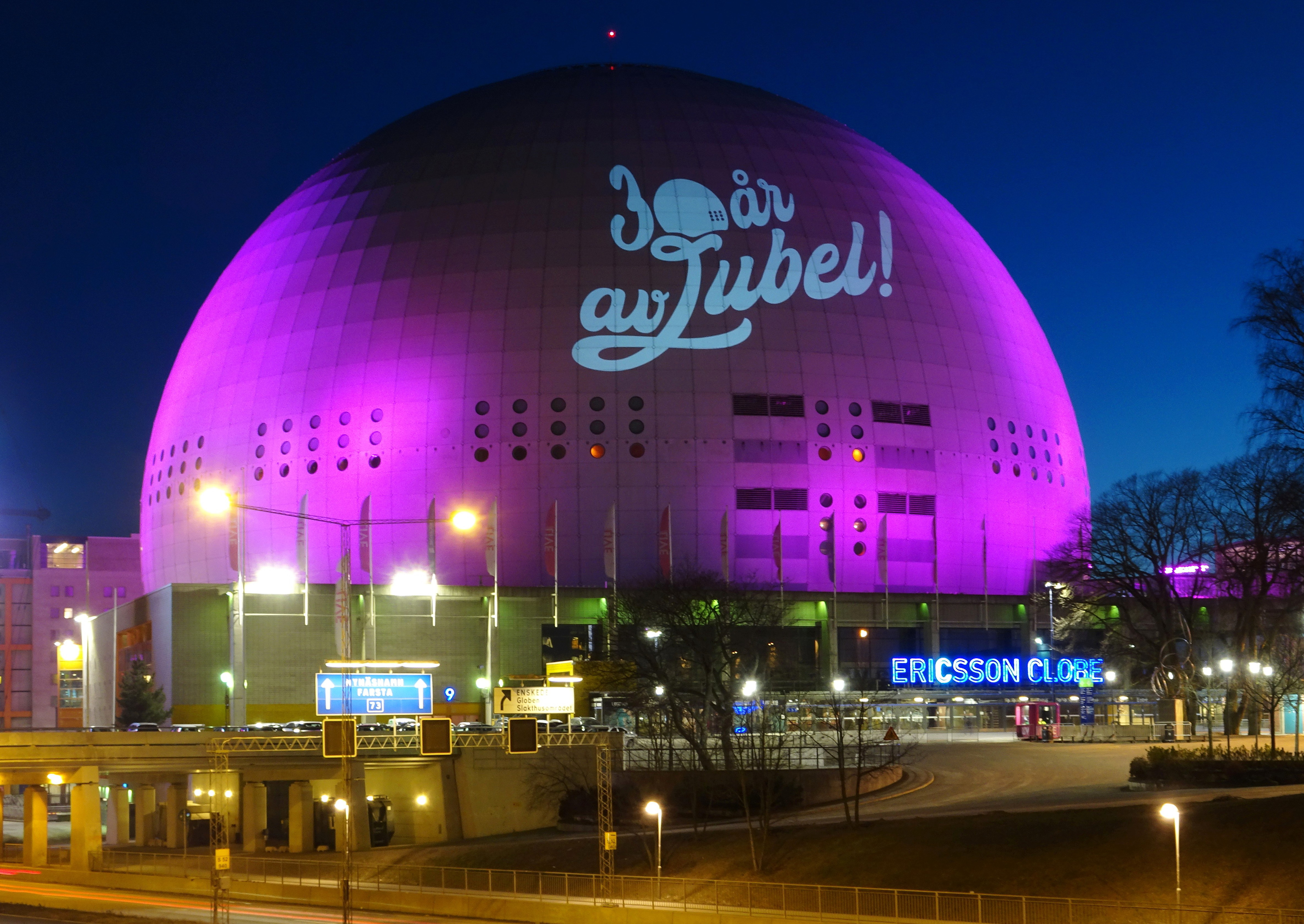
The Eurovision Song Contest 2000 took place at the Globe Arena in Stockholm, Sweden, on 13 May 2000.

The Eurovision Song Contest 2000 took place at the Globe Arena in Stockholm, Sweden, on 13 May 2000. According to the Eurovision rules, the 24-country participant list for the contest was composed of: the winning country from the previous year's contest; the "Big Four" countries which provided the highest financial backing for the contest (France, Germany, Spain and the United Kingdom); the 18 countries, other than the previous year's winner, which had obtained the highest average number of points over the last five contests; and any countries which had not participated in the previous year's content. Belgium was one of the 18 countries with the highest average scores, and thus were permitted to participate. On 21 November 1999, an allocation draw was held which determined the running order and Belgium was set to perform in position 10, following the entry from Russia and before the entry from Cyprus. "Envie de vivre" received 2 points, placing Belgium last of the 24 entrants, the eighth time that Belgium had finished at the foot of the Eurovision scoreboard.

The contest was broadcast in Belgium by both the Flemish and Walloon broadcasters. VRT broadcast the show on TV1 with commentary in Dutch by André Vermeulen and Anja Daems. RTBF televised the show on La Une with commentary in French by Jean-Pierre Hautier.

=== Voting ===
Below is a breakdown of points awarded to and by Belgium in the contest. The nation awarded its 12 points to Latvia in the contest.

RTBF appointed Thomas Van Hamme as its spokesperson to announce the results of the Belgian televote during the broadcast.

Points awarded to Belgium
Score	Country
12 points	
10 points	
8 points	
7 points	
6 points	
5 points	
4 points	
3 points	
2 points	Macedonia
1 point	

Points awarded by Belgium
Score	Country
12 points	Latvia
10 points	Denmark
8 points	Netherlands
7 points	Russia
6 points	Germany
5 points	Sweden
4 points	Ireland
3 points	Turkey
2 points	Estonia
1 point	Malta
