= Norway in the Eurovision Song Contest 2000 =

- Eurovision Song Contest 2000
- Participating broadcaster: Norsk rikskringkasting (NRK)
- Country: Norway
- Selection process: Melodi Grand Prix 2000
- Selection date: 4 March 2000

Competing entry
- Song: "My Heart Goes Boom"
- Artist: Charmed
- Songwriters: Tore Madsen; Morten Henriksen

Placement
- Final result: 11th, 57 points

Participation chronology

Norway was represented at the Eurovision Song Contest 2000 with the song "My Heart Goes Boom", composed by Morten Henriksen, with lyrics by Tore Madsen, and performed by the group Charmed. The Norwegian participating broadcaster, Norsk rikskringkasting (NRK), organised the national final Melodi Grand Prix 2000 in order to select its entry for the contest. Ten entries competed in a show that took place on 4 March 2000 and the winner was determined over two rounds of voting from a five-member jury panel and a regional televote. The top four entries in the first round of voting advanced to the competition's second round—the superfinal. In the second round of voting, "My Heart Goes Boom" performed by Charmed was selected as the winner.

Norway competed in the Eurovision Song Contest which took place on 13 May 2000. Performing during the show in position 8, Norway placed eleventh out of the 24 participating countries, scoring 57 points.

== Background ==
Prior to the 2000 contest, Norsk rikskringkasting (NRK) had participated in the Eurovision Song Contest representing Norway 39 times since its first entry in 1960. It had won the contest on two occasions: in 1985 with the song "La det swinge" performed by Bobbysocks!, and in 1995 with the song "Nocturne" performed by Secret Garden. It also had the two distinctions of having finished last in the Eurovision final more than any other country and for having the most nul points (zero points) in the contest, the latter being a record the nation shared together with Austria. It had finished last seven times and had failed to score a point during four contests.

As part of its duties as participating broadcaster, NRK organises the selection of its entry in the Eurovision Song Contest and broadcasts the event in the country. The broadcaster has traditionally organised the national final Melodi Grand Prix to select its entry for the contest in all but one of its participation. The broadcaster organized Melodi Grand Prix 2000 in order to select its 2000 entry.

== Before Eurovision ==
=== Melodi Grand Prix 2000 ===
Melodi Grand Prix 2000 was the 39th edition of the national final Melodi Grand Prix, that was organised by NRK to select its entry for the Eurovision Song Contest 2000. The broadcaster held the national final on 4 March 2000 at its Studio 1 in Oslo, hosted by Hans Christian Andersen and Stine Buer and was televised on NRK1. The national final was watched by 1.346 million viewers in Norway with a market share of 75%.

==== Competing entries ====
Composers were directly invited by NRK to compete in the national final. Ten songs were selected for the competition and the competing acts and songs were revealed on 23 February 2000. Among the competing artists was former Norwegian Eurovision Song Contest entrant Jan Werner Danielsen who represented Norway in 1994 alongside Elisabeth Andreassen.

Artist	Song	Songwriter(s)
Arnold B Family	"When I Am Looking"	Thomas Børud, Arnold Børud
Astri	"I Never Stopped Lovin' You"	Jimmy James Ekgren, Sigurd Røsnes
Charmed	"My Heart Goes Boom"	Morten Henriksen, Tore Madsen
Jan Werner Danielsen	"One More Time"	Are Sigvardsen
Jorun Erdal	"Another You"	Per Øystein Sørensen, Kari Iveland
Kine	"Wings of Love"	Kenneth Eriksen, Willy Ludvigsen
Marius Hoff	"She's My Baby"	Christian Ingebrigtsen
Miriam Mercedes	"Trying to Forget U"	Anders Moberg
Sha-Boom	"Let's Go All the Way"	Dag Finn Strøm, Sigurd Røsnes, Ole Evenrud
Wentzel	"If"	Hilde Heltberg, Kari Iveland

==== Final ====
Ten songs competed during the final on 4 March 2000. The winner was selected by a combination of votes from regional televoting (5/7) and an expert jury (2/7) over two rounds. In the first round, the results of the public televote were divided into Norway's five regions and each region distributed points as follows: 1–8, 10 and 12 points. The jury then distributed points that had a weighting equal to the votes of two televoting regions and the top four entries were selected to proceed to the second round, the superfinal. In the superfinal, each televoting region distributed points as follows: 8, 10 and 12 points. The jury then distributed points that again had a weighting equal to the votes of two televoting regions, leading to the victory of "My Heart Goes Boom" performed by Charmed. The jury panel consisted of Gunilla Holm Platou (TV2 presenter), Kyrre Fritzner (composer and music producer), Marte Krogh (violinist), Torstein Bieler (songwriter and music producer) and Hege Tepstad (NRK Underholdning presenter).

Final – 4 March 2000
R/O	Artist	Song	Jury	Televoting Regions					Public	Total	Place
R/O	Artist	Song	Jury	Tromsø	Trondheim	Bergen	Oslo	Kristiansand	Public	Total	Place
1	Charmed	"My Heart Goes Boom"	16	12	12	12	10	10	56	72	1
2	Sha-Boom	"Let's Go All the Way"	2	1	1	1	1	1	5	7	10
3	Jorun Erdal	"Another You"	6	8	8	10	8	8	42	48	4
4	Marius Hoff	"She's My Baby"	14	4	4	3	3	3	17	31	6
5	Arnold B Family	"When I Am Looking"	8	3	3	4	5	6	21	29	7
6	Wentzel	"If"	24	7	7	7	7	7	35	59	3
7	Astri	"I Never Stopped Lovin' You"	4	6	5	6	4	4	25	29	7
8	Miriam Mercedes	"Trying to Forget U"	10	2	2	2	2	2	10	20	9
9	Kine	"Wings of Love"	20	5	6	5	6	5	27	47	5
10	Jan Werner Danielsen	"One More Time"	12	10	10	8	12	12	48	64	2

Superfinal – 4 March 2000
R/O	Artist	Song	Jury	Televoting Regions					Public	Total	Place
R/O	Artist	Song	Jury	Tromsø	Trondheim	Bergen	Oslo	Kristiansand	Public	Total	Place
1	Charmed	"My Heart Goes Boom"	24	12	12	12	12	12	60	84	1
2	Jorun Erdal	"Another You"	0						0	0	4
3	Wentzel	"If"	20	8	8	8	8	8	40	60	3
4	Jan Werner Danielsen	"One More Time"	16	10	10	10	10	10	50	66	2

== At Eurovision ==
According to Eurovision rules, the 24-country participant list for the contest was composed of: the previous year's winning country and host nation Sweden, "Big Four" countries, the thirteen countries, which had obtained the highest average points total over the preceding five contests, and any eligible countries which did not compete in the 1999 contest. On 21 November 1999, an allocation draw was held which determined the running order and Norway was set to perform in position 8, following the entry from Malta and before the entry from Russia. Norway finished in eleventh place with 57 points.

In Norway, the show was broadcast on NRK1 with commentary by Jostein Pedersen as well as broadcast via radio on NRK P1 with commentary by Stein Dag Jensen.

=== Voting ===
Below is a breakdown of points awarded to Norway and awarded by Norway in the contest. The nation awarded its 12 points to Latvia in the contest.

NRK appointed Marit Åslein as its spokesperson to announce the Norwegian votes during the show.

Points awarded to Norway
Score	Country
12 points	
10 points	Turkey
8 points	
7 points	Denmark; Iceland; Israel; Sweden
6 points	Latvia
5 points	
4 points	Ireland
3 points	Estonia; Malta; United Kingdom
2 points	
1 point	

Points awarded by Norway
Score	Country
12 points	Latvia
10 points	Denmark
8 points	Russia
7 points	Iceland
6 points	Ireland
5 points	Sweden
4 points	Estonia
3 points	Germany
2 points	Malta
1 point	Turkey
