= Eurovision Song Contest 2000 =

International song competition

Date and venue
- Final: 13 May 2000
- Venue: Stockholm Globe Arena; Stockholm, Sweden

Organisation
- Organiser: European Broadcasting Union (EBU)
- Scrutineer: Christine Marchal-Ortiz

Production
- Host broadcaster: Sveriges Television (SVT)
- Director: Marius Bratten
- Executive producer: Svante Stockselius
- Presenters: Kattis Ahlström; Anders Lundin

Participants
- Number of entries: 24
- Debuting countries: Latvia
- Returning countries: Finland; Macedonia; Romania; Russia; Switzerland
- Non-returning countries: Bosnia and Herzegovina; Lithuania; Poland; Portugal; Slovenia
- Participation map: Competing countries Relegated countries unable to participate due to poor results in previous contests Countries that participated in the past but not in 2000

Vote
- Voting system: Each country awarded 12, 10, 8–1 point(s) to their 10 favourite songs
- Winning song: Denmark; "Fly on the Wings of Love"

The Eurovision Song Contest 2000 was the 45th edition of the Eurovision Song Contest, held on 13 May 2000 at the Stockholm Globe Arena in Stockholm, Sweden, and presented by Kattis Ahlström and Anders Lundin. It was organised by the European Broadcasting Union (EBU) and host broadcaster Sveriges Television (SVT), who staged the event after winning the 1999 contest for Sweden with the song "Take Me to Your Heaven" by Charlotte Nilsson. With an audience of 13,000 people present, the 2000 contest was the largest seen in its history until that point.

Broadcasters from twenty-four countries participated in the contest. Bosnia and Herzegovina, Lithuania, Poland, Portugal and Slovenia, which had participated in the 1999 contest, were relegated after achieving the lowest average points totals over the preceding five contests. These countries were replaced by Latvia in its first contest appearance, Finland, Macedonia, Romania and Switzerland which were relegated from the previous year's event, and Russia which returned after a two-year absence.

The winner was Denmark with the song "Fly on the Wings of Love", written by Jørgen Olsen and performed by the Olsen Brothers. Although Denmark was not a pre-contest favourite to win the title, "Fly on the Wings of Love" received the third-highest points total yet seen in the contest, gaining 195 points, and the song went on to become a success in singles charts across Europe. Russia, Latvia, Estonia, and Germany rounded out the top five, with Russia and Estonia achieving their best ever results, and Latvia achieving one of the highest placings for a début entry in the contest's history. The 2000 contest was the first to be broadcast over the internet, with a webcast of the live show available in Europe, the United States, Canada and Australia through Microsoft's MSN portals.

== Location ==
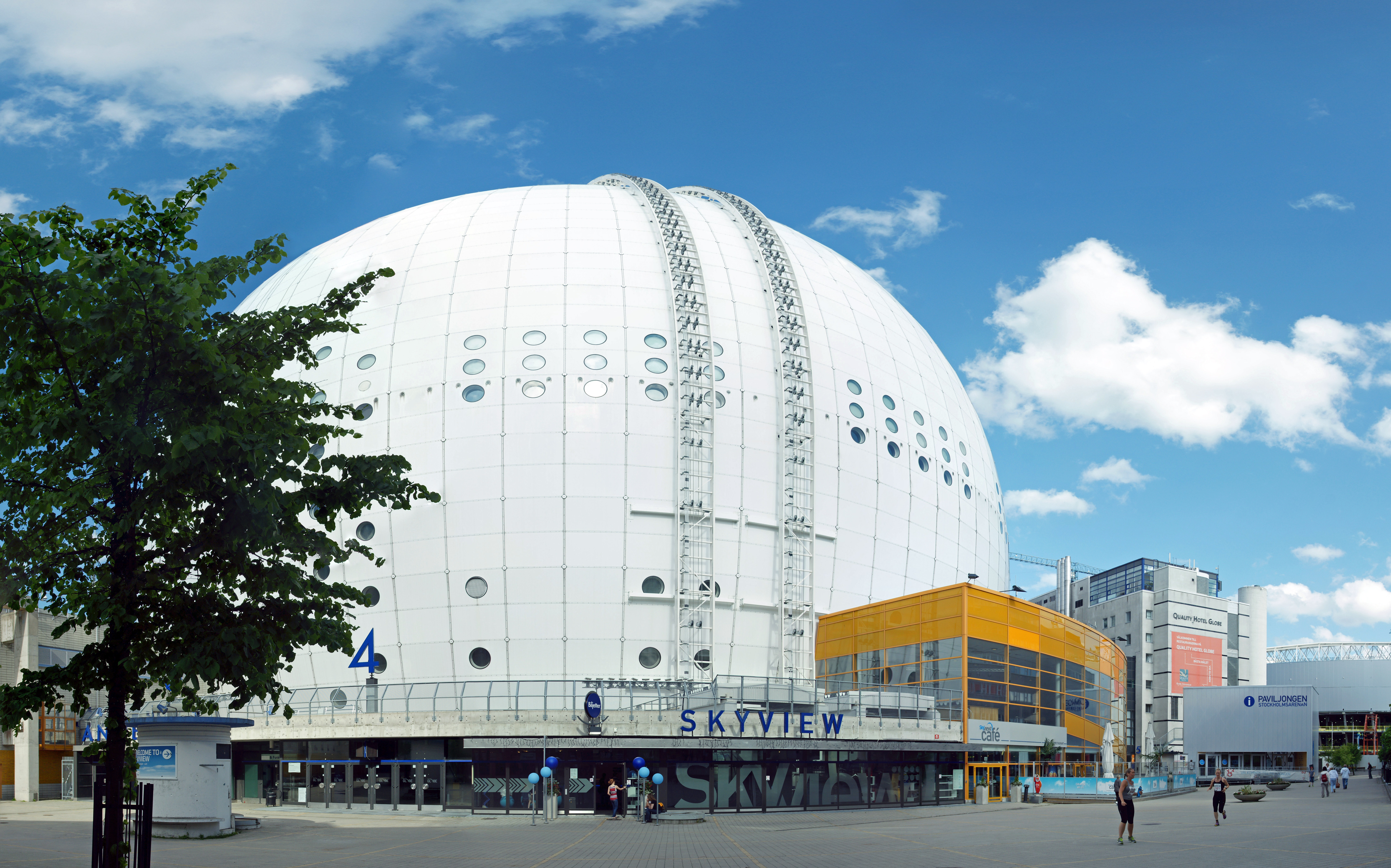
Stockholm Globe Arena, host venue of the 2000 contest.

Locations of the candidate cities: the chosen host city is marked in blue, the shortlisted city is marked in green, while the eliminated city is marked in red.

The 2000 contest took place in Stockholm, Sweden, following the country's victory at the 1999 edition with the song "Take Me to Your Heaven", performed by Charlotte Nilsson. It was the fourth time that Sweden had staged the contest, following the 1975, 1985 and 1992 contests held in Stockholm, Gothenburg, and Malmö, respectively. The selected venue was the Stockholm Globe Arena, also known as Globen in Swedish, an indoor arena first opened in 1989 and the world's largest hemispherical building. With capacity for over 16,000 people, which was reduced slightly to 13,000 for the contest, the Globe Arena was the largest venue the Eurovision Song Contest had ever seen at that point.

Host broadcaster Sveriges Television (SVT) approached venues in three cities – namely Gothenburg, Malmö and Stockholm – to establish a suitable host city and venue for the contest. The venues chosen following this initial round of discussions were the Scandinavium in Gothenburg, which had previously hosted the 1985 contest; Malmömässan in Malmö; and Globen in Stockholm. Malmö was subsequently eliminated as a potential host city, due to high costs required to complete a suitable arena within the Malmömässan area and which would still have a relatively small audience capacity compared to the other venues on offer. Of the remaining options, Stockholm and Globen were ultimately chosen by SVT managing director Sam Nilsson to host the event. Stockholm's bid won out over Gothenburg due to the lower costs of producing the event in the capital as well as with Stockholm having not hosted the event since 1975.

== Participants ==
Eurovision Song Contest 2000 – Participation summaries by country
- Austria; Belgium; Croatia; Cyprus; Denmark; Estonia; Finland; France; Germany; Iceland; Ireland; Israel; Latvia; Macedonia; Malta; Netherlands; Norway; Romania; Russia; Spain; Sweden; Switzerland; Turkey; United Kingdom

Per the rules of the contest twenty-four countries were allowed to participate in the 2000 contest, one more than the twenty-three countries that participated in the 1999 event. Latvia entered the contest for the first time, and Finland, Macedonia, Romania, Russia, and Switzerland returned after being absent from the previous year's event. 1999 participants Bosnia and Herzegovina, Lithuania, Poland, Portugal and Slovenia did not participate in this year's contest.

Several of the performing artists had previously competed as lead artists in past editions. Serafín Zubiri competed in the contest for a second time, having previously participated for Spain in 1992. Roger Pontare competed as a solo artist in this year's edition, following his appearance for Sweden in 1994 where he competed alongside Marie Bergman. The two members of the Cypriot duo Voice, Alexandros Panayi and Christina Argyri, had also both participated in Eurovision before, with Panayi having previously represented Cyprus in 1995, while Argyri had been a backing performer at the same contest. A number of former participating artists also returned to perform as backing vocalists for some of the competing entries: Eyjólfur Kristjánsson, having previously represented Iceland in 1991 alongside Stefán Hilmarsson, returned to support the Icelandic duo August and Telma as a backing singer; Albano Carrisi, who twice represented Italy in 1976 and 1985 with Romina Power as Al Bano and Romina Power, supported Switzerland's Jane Bogaert on stage; and Gabriel Forss, a member of the group Blond that represented Sweden in 1997, was a backing singer for Malta's Claudette Pace in this year's event. Additionally, Eamonn Toal competed for Ireland in this year's contest, having previously served as backing vocalist for Ireland in 1995.

Eurovision Song Contest 2000 participants
Country	Broadcaster	Artist	Song	Language	Songwriter(s)
Austria	ORF	The Rounder Girls	"All to You"	English	Dave Moskin
Belgium	RTBF	Nathalie Sorce	"Envie de vivre"	French	Silvio Pezzuto
Croatia	HRT	Goran Karan	"Kad zaspu anđeli"	Croatian	Nenad Ninčević; Zdenko Runjić
Cyprus	CyBC	Voice	"Nomiza" (Νόμιζα)	Greek, Italian	Silvia M. Klemm; Alexandros Panayi
Denmark	DR	Olsen Brothers	"Fly on the Wings of Love"	English	Jørgen Olsen
Estonia	ETV	Ines	"Once in a Lifetime"	English	Jana Hallas; Ilmar Laisaar; Alar Kotkas; Pearu Paulus
Finland	YLE	Nina Åström	"A Little Bit"	English	Luca Genta; Gerrit aan 't Goor
France	France Télévision	Sofia Mestari	"On aura le ciel"	French	Benoît Heinrich; Pierre Legay
Germany	NDR (Note: On behalf of the German public broadcasting consortium ARD)	Stefan Raab	"Wadde hadde dudde da?"	German, English	Stefan Raab
Iceland	RÚV	August and Telma	"Tell Me!"	English	Örlygur Smári; Sigurður Örn Jónsson
Ireland	RTÉ	Eamonn Toal	"Millennium of Love"	English	Gerry Simpson; Raymond J. Smyth
Israel	IBA	PingPong	"Sameach" (שמח)	Hebrew	Roy Arad; Guy Asif; Ronen Ben Tal
Latvia	LTV	Brainstorm	"My Star"	English	Renārs Kaupers
Macedonia	MRT	XXL	"100% te ljubam" (100% те љубам)	Macedonian, English	Vlado Janevski; Dragan Karanfilovski; Orče Zafirovski
Malta	PBS	Claudette Pace	"Desire"	English	Gerard James Borg; Philip Vella
Netherlands	NOS	Linda	"No Goodbyes"	English	Ellert Driessen; John O'Hare
Norway	NRK	Charmed	"My Heart Goes Boom"	English	Morten Henriksen; Tore Madsen
Romania	TVR	Taxi	"The Moon" (Note: On-screen captions used the Romanian title "Luna")	English	Dan Teodorescu
Russia	ORT	Alsou	"Solo"	English	Brandon Barnes; Andrew Lane
Spain	TVE	Serafín Zubiri	"Colgado de un sueño"	Spanish	José María Purón
Sweden	SVT	Roger Pontare	"When Spirits Are Calling My Name"	English	Peter Dahl; Thomas Holmstrand; Linda Jansson
Switzerland	SRG SSR	Jane Bogaert	"La vita cos'è?"	Italian	Thomas Marin; Bernie Staub
Turkey	TRT	Pınar and the SOS	"Yorgunum Anla"	Turkish, English	Pınar Ayhan; Sühan Ayhan; Orkun Yazgan
United Kingdom	BBC	Nicki French	"Don't Play That Song Again"	English	Gerry Shephard; John Springate

=== Qualification ===
Due to the high number of countries wishing to enter the contest, a relegation system was introduced in 1993 in order to reduce the number of countries which could compete in each year's contest. Any relegated countries would be able to return the following year, thus allowing all countries the opportunity to compete in at least one in every two editions. The relegation rules introduced for the 1997 contest were again utilised ahead of the 2000 contest, based on each country's average points total in previous contests. However the rules were modified for 2000 to ensure that the four participating countries which provide the largest financial contribution towards the organisation of the contest would be given an automatic place in the contest every year. This group – comprising France, Germany, Spain and the United Kingdom – was subsequently dubbed the "Big Four" group of countries. Alongside the previous year's winning country and the Big Four, the remaining places in the 2000 contest were given to any eligible countries which had not competed in the 1999 contest, and the countries which had competed in 1999 that had obtained the highest average points total over the preceding five contests. In cases where the average was identical between two or more countries, the total number of points scored in the most recent contest determined the final order.

Bosnia and Herzegovina, Lithuania, Poland, Portugal and Slovenia were therefore excluded from participating in the 2000 contest, to make way for the return of Finland, Macedonia, Romania, Russia and Switzerland, and debuting country Latvia. Broadcasters in Greece, Hungary, and Slovakia, participating countries from the 1998 contest which had not competed in 1999, and were therefore eligible to participate in 2000, decided not to enter, reportedly due to financial reasons.

The calculations used to determine the countries relegated for the 2000 contest are outlined in the table below.

Table key

Qualifier
‡ Automatic qualifier
† New/returning countries which did not compete in 1999

Calculation of average points to determine qualification for the 2000 contest (Note: Determined by totalling all points awarded in the past five contests and dividing by the number of times that country had participated.)
Rank	Country	Average	Yearly Point Totals				
Rank	Country	Average	1995	1996	1997	1998	1999
1	United Kingdom ‡	116.80	76	77	227	166	38
2	Israel	115.33	81	DNQ		172	93
3	Sweden ‡	90.40	100	100	36	53	163
4	Ireland	89.00	44	162	157	64	18
5	Croatia	84.60	91	98	24	131	79 (Note: Croatia's score from the 1999 contest was reduced by 33% for the purposes of determining average scores due to the use of synthesised pre-recorded vocals in that year's Croatian entry.)
6	Malta	81.40	76	68	66	165	32
7	Netherlands	76.00	R	78	5	150	71
8	Estonia	75.50	R	94	82	36	90
9	Norway	75.20	148	114	0	79	35
10	Denmark	62.67	92	DNQ	25	R	71
11	Germany ‡	62.25	1	DNQ	22	86	140
12	Iceland	61.50	31	51	18	R	146
13	Cyprus	57.60	79	72	98	37	2
14	Austria	53.00	67	68	12	R	65
15	Spain ‡	50.80	119	17	96	21	1
16	Turkey	49.00	21	57	121	25	21
17	Belgium	47.50	8	22	R	122	38
18	Slovenia	45.40	84	16	60	17	50
19	France ‡	44.80	94	18	95	3	14
20	Bosnia and Herzegovina	33.75	14	13	22	R	86
21	Portugal	29.00	5	92	0	36	12
22	Poland	27.20	15	31	54	19	17
23	Russia †	25.00	17	DNQ	33	R	
24	Macedonia †	16.00		DNQ	R	16	R
25	Finland †	15.50	R	9	R	22	R
26	Lithuania	13.00	R		R		13
27	Switzerland †	9.00	R	22	5	0	R
28	Romania †	6.00	R	DNQ	R	6	R
–	Latvia †	– (Note: Debut appearance)					

== Production ==
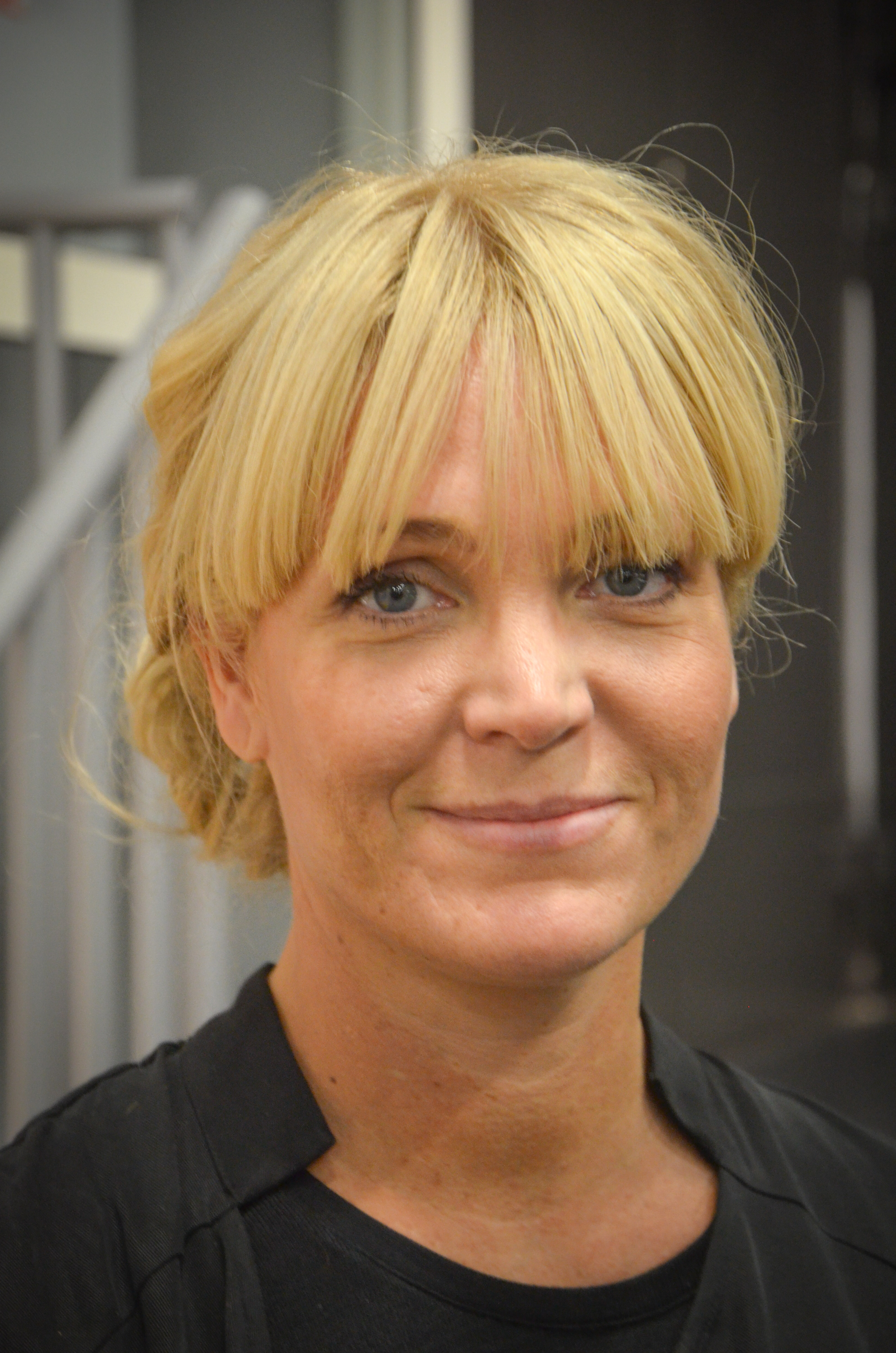
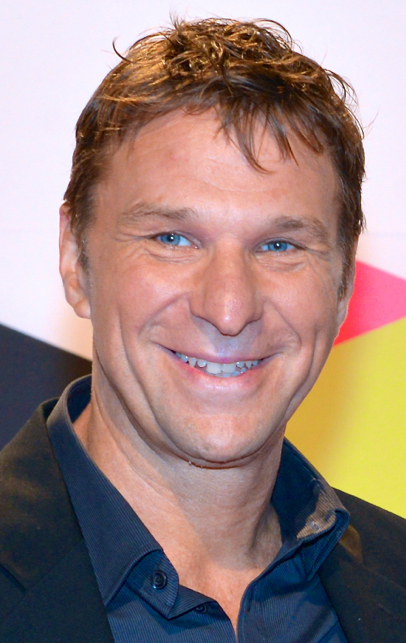
Kattis Ahlström (left) and Anders Lundin, the presenters of the contest

The Eurovision Song Contest 2000 was produced SVT; Svante Stockselius served as executive producer, Peter Lundin served as producer, Marius Bratten served as director, and Mikael Varhelyi and Kristofer Röhr served as designers. On behalf of the contest organisers, the European Broadcasting Union (EBU), the event was overseen by Christine Marchal-Ortiz as scrutineer. The contest was presented by the journalist Kattis Ahlström and the television presenter Anders Lundin.

The graphic design, including the contest's logo, scoreboard, on-screen overlays and postcards, was developed by Stockholm Design Lab. The chosen logo, presented publicly in early 2000, was a pair of open lips, and described as "a sensual, yet stylistically pure, mouth representing song, dialogue and speech" by its designers; ahead of the 2004 contest this logo was also considered by contest organisers when developing the contest's new generic logo for that edition. The logo also featured prominently as part of the set design; the outline of the mouth featured on a display next to the stage and was filled with a distorted form of each country's national flag as its entry was performed. The 2000 contest was the first to incorporate LED display technology within the set design, with five LED pillars featuring on stage during each performance and displaying images designed to complement each song's theme or presentation and producing a unique backdrop to each performance.

A compilation album featuring all 24 competing entries was released within Europe ahead of the contest, through the German record labels Ariola and BMG. This was the first time an official album had been commissioned by the organisers and followed a previous attempt at an album for the 1999 contest which failed to contain all entries in that year's contest due to copyright issues.

== Format ==
=== Entries ===
Each participating broadcaster was represented by one song, which was required to be no longer than three minutes in duration. A maximum of six performers were allowed on stage during each country's performance and all performers were required to be at least 16 years old in the year the contest was held. Selected entries were not permitted to be released commercially before 1 January 2000, and were then only allowed to be released in the country they represented until after the contest was held (except as part of a compilation album of all participating songs). The final submission date for all selected entries to be received by the contest organisers was set for 10 March. This submission was required to include a sound recording of the entry and backing track for use during the contest, a video presentation of the song on stage being performed by the artists, and the text of the song lyrics in its original language and translations in French and English for distribution to the participating broadcasters, their commentators and juries. Selected performers were required to be available from 7 May, with a staggered timetable for rehearsals in the contest venue to be developed by the organisers.

Following the confirmation of the 24 competing countries, the draw to determine the running order was held in Stockholm on 21 November 1999.

=== Voting procedure ===
The results of the 2000 contest were determined using the scoring system introduced in 1975: each country awarded twelve points to its favourite entry, followed by ten points to its second favourite, and then awarded points in decreasing value from eight to one for the remaining songs which featured in the country's top ten, with countries unable to vote for their own entry. Each participating broadcaster was required to use televoting to determine their points, with viewers able to register their vote by telephone for a total of five minutes following the performance of the last competing entry. Viewers could vote by calling one of twenty-three different telephone numbers to represent the twenty-four competing entries except that which represented their own country. Once phone lines were opened a video recap containing short clips of each competing entry with the accompanying phone number for voting was shown in order to aid viewers during the voting window, with each household able to vote a maximum of three times. Systems were also put in place to prevent lobby groups from one country voting for their entry by travelling to other countries.

Participating broadcasters which were unable to hold a televote in its country due to technological limitations could be granted an exception and their points would then be determined by a jury. Those conducting a televote were also required to assemble a jury, the votes of which could be used in case of a technical failure which prevented the televoting results from being rendered unusable. Each jury was composed of eight individuals, which was required to be split evenly between members of the public and music professionals, comprised additionally of an equal number of men and women, and below and above 30 years of age. Each jury member voted in secret and awarded between one and ten votes to each participating song, excluding that from their own country and with no abstentions permitted. The votes of each member were collected immediately following the country's performance and then tallied by the non-voting jury chairperson to determine the points to be awarded. In any cases where two or more songs received the same number of votes, a show of hands by all jury members was used to determine the final placing; if a tie still remained, the youngest jury member would have the deciding vote. All juries were based in their own countries and followed the contest through television, seeing the performances just as the public watching at home would. Juries watched not only the contest itself on 13 May 2000 but also the final dress rehearsal, which was held on the same day and produced under the exact same conditions as the actual contest. In order to maintain the integrity of the vote, reception of the contest to the juries was severed during the announcement of the results until after the points for their country had been announced; the points to be awarded from the last five countries in the voting order were also required to be sent ahead of time via fax to the contest organisers.

=== Postcards ===
Each entry was preceded by a video postcard which served as an introduction to that country, as well as providing an opportunity to showcase the running artistic theme of the event and to create a transition between entries to allow stage crew to make changes on stage. The postcards for the 2000 contest focussed on different aspects of life in Sweden; central to each country's postcard was a specific concept, e.g. an object or person, from that country which can be found in everyday Swedish life. The exception to this was the postcard for the Swedish entry, which showed a group of workers at Expo 2000 in Hannover, Germany. Listed below by order of performance are the locations featured in each postcard as well as the concept for the respective country represented:

1. Israel – Stockholm Public Library; a book by the Israeli author Amos Oz
2. Netherlands – Microbiology Centre, Karolinska Institute; Dutch scientists
3. United Kingdom – Råsunda Stadium; the British football manager Stuart Baxter
4. Estonia – Apartment in Stockholm; Estonian choral singing
5. France – Nightclub in Stockholm; French club music
6. Romania – Masquerade at the Royal Swedish Opera; a man dressed as Dracula
7. Malta – Stockholm harbour; the Maltese cross upon the sail of a boat
8. Norway – Stockholm City Centre; a man fills a boat with Norwegian petrol
9. Russia – Royal Dramatic Theatre; a performance of Anton Chekhov's Three Sisters
10. Belgium – Neighbourhood in Stockholm; a burglar is stopped by two chiens de Saint-Hubert
11. Cyprus – Underground station in Stockholm; two long-distance ice skaters eat Cypriot oranges
12. Iceland – Forest outside Stockholm; two campers are disturbed by two Icelandic horses
13. Spain – Moderna Museet; designed by the Spanish architect Rafael Moneo
14. Denmark – Apartment building in Stockholm; various apartments all have the same Danish lamp
15. Germany – Street in Stockholm; a street vendor holds a knackwurst as a police chase passes by
16. Switzerland – Eriksdalsbadet; a swimming race is timed using Swiss technology
17. Croatia – Stockholm from the air; a group of skydivers use parachutes, credited to the Croatian inventor Faust Vrančić
18. Sweden – Expo 2000, Hannover, Germany; construction workers watch the Eurovision Song Contest 2000
19. Macedonia – Cinema in Stockholm; showing of the Macedonian film Before the Rain
20. Finland – Stockholm Archipelago; a ferry from Finland
21. Latvia – Restaurant in Stockholm; pickled mushrooms, a Latvian speciality
22. Turkey – Internet office in Stockholm; Mahir Çağrı, a Turkish internet celebrity
23. Ireland – Dance studio in Stockholm; a group perform Irish dance
24. Austria – Stockholm Arlanda Airport; a man returns from an Austrian ski holiday with a noticeable sun tan

== Contest overview ==
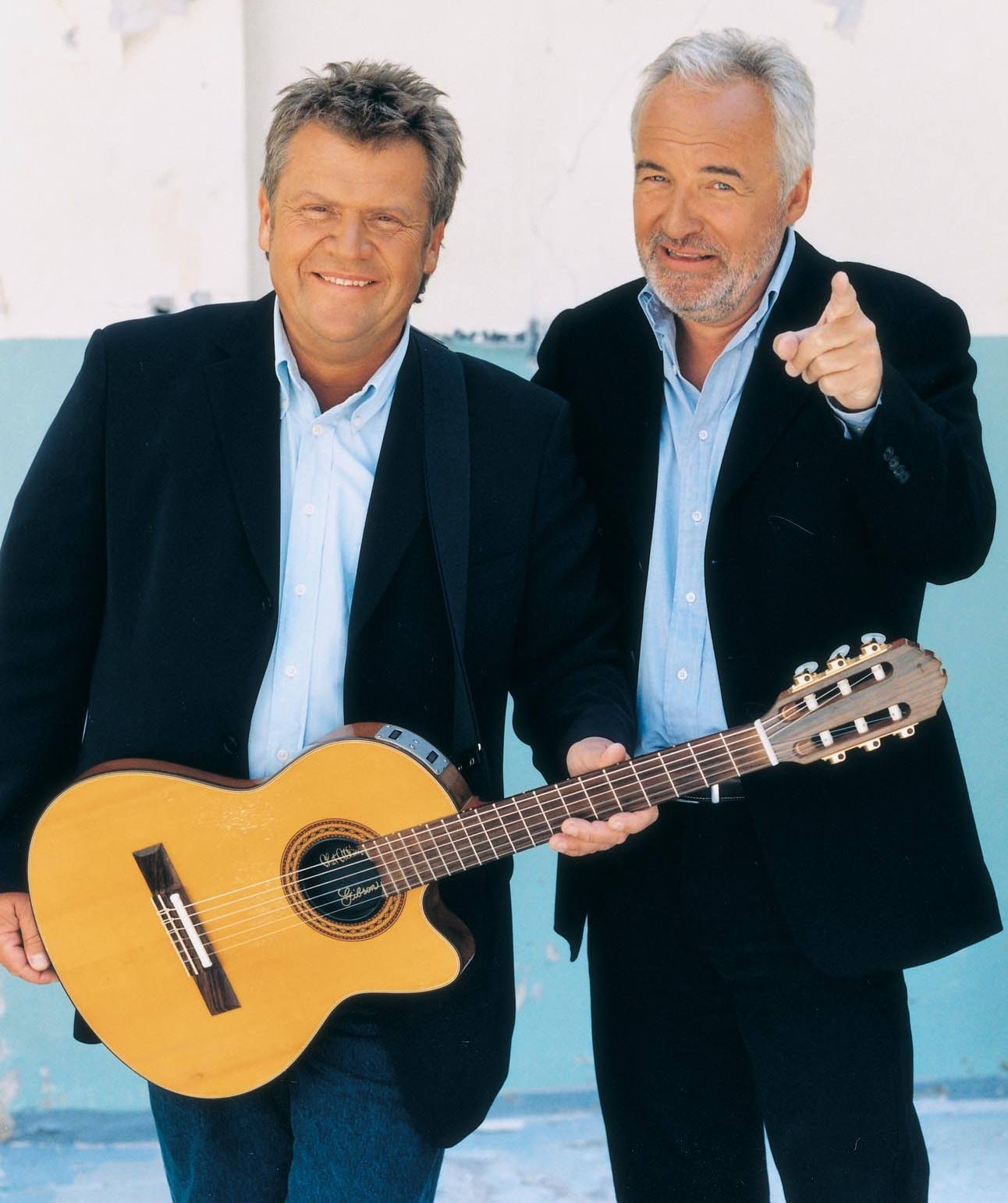
The Olsen Brothers (pictured in 2008) were the second Danish act to win the contest, thirty-seven years after the country's previous win.

The contest was held on 13 May 2000 at 21:00 CEST and lasted 3 hours and 2 minutes. The table below outlines the participating countries, the order in which they performed, the competing artists and songs, and the results of the voting.

The show began with a video montage, comprising various scenes of contemporary Sweden overlaid with the shadow of a human mouth, representing the contest logo, reciting the names of the 24 participating countries in English in the order in which they would perform. The montage finished with a night-time aerial shot of the Globe Arena, followed by live transmission from inside the arena, where violinist Caroline Lundgren, dressed in traditional Swedish folk costume, exclaimed "Welcome Europe!" This was followed by a welcome from the presenters of the contest, Kattis Ahlström and Anders Lundin, in various languages of the participating countries. The interval act, "Once Upon a Time Europe Was Covered with Ice", mixed pre-recorded elements from various musicians and people from across Europe with live performances within the Globe Arena, and was composed and edited by Johan Söderberg and produced by John Nordling. The performance within the Globe Arena featured Lundgren on violin, the Strängnäs Drum Corps, street musicians and performers from Stockholm, and the Bounce Streetdance Company.

The winner was Denmark represented by the song "Fly on the Wings of Love", written by Jørgen Olsen and performed by the Olsen Brothers. This marked Denmark's second contest win, thirty-seven years after its first victory in 1963. Russia and Estonia achieved their best-ever results, finishing second and fourth respectively, while Latvia achieved one of the strongest ever début performances in the contest's history with a third-place finish. Denmark's win was considered by some to be a surprise, as the song was not among the pre-contest favourites of fans or bookmakers, both of which had highly tipped Estonia for the win; however the Danish song ultimately received the third-highest points total yet seen at Eurovision and would go on to success across European charts in the weeks following the contest. Following the contest, the Russian delegation petitioned for Denmark to be disqualified due to the use of a vocoder during a brief moment of the performance to add an electronic sound to the vocals; the petition was ultimately rejected by the EBU.

The Israeli entry, "Sameach" by the group PingPong, caused some controversy in the lead-up to the contest. The music video for the song, released the month before the contest, featured same-sex kissing amongst the band members, singing into cucumbers, and other suggestive scenes with phallic imagery, which caused consternation with Israeli religious leaders and right-wing groups. The performance of the song, about an Israeli woman having a love affair with a man from Damascus, also saw the group waving both Israeli and Syrian flags in a call for peace between the two nations. However the participating Israeli broadcaster IBA raised objections during rehearsals, and subsequently disavowed its entry from the contest after the group refused to remove the Syrian flags from their performance; although the broadcaster did not prevent the group from performing in the contest, it was reported that the broadcaster had pulled funding for the group entirely.

Results of the Eurovision Song Contest 2000
R/O	Country	Artist	Song	Points	Place
1	Israel	PingPong	"Sameach"	7	22
2	Netherlands	Linda	"No Goodbyes"	40	13
3	United Kingdom	Nicki French	"Don't Play That Song Again"	28	16
4	Estonia	Ines	"Once in a Lifetime"	98	4
5	France	Sofia Mestari	"On aura le ciel"	5	23
6	Romania	Taxi	"The Moon"	25	17
7	Malta	Claudette Pace	"Desire"	73	8
8	Norway	Charmed	"My Heart Goes Boom"	57	11
9	Russia	Alsou	"Solo"	155	2
10	Belgium	Nathalie Sorce	"Envie de vivre"	2	24
11	Cyprus	Voice	"Nomiza"	8	21
12	Iceland	August and Telma	"Tell Me!"	45	12
13	Spain	Serafín Zubiri	"Colgado de un sueño"	18	18
14	Denmark	Olsen Brothers	"Fly on the Wings of Love"	195	1
15	Germany	Stefan Raab	"Wadde hadde dudde da?"	96	5
16	Switzerland	Jane Bogaert	"La vita cos'è?"	14	20
17	Croatia	Goran Karan	"Kad zaspu anđeli"	70	9
18	Sweden	Roger Pontare	"When Spirits Are Calling My Name"	88	7
19	Macedonia	XXL	"100% te ljubam"	29	15
20	Finland	Nina Åström	"A Little Bit"	18	18
21	Latvia	Brainstorm	"My Star"	136	3
22	Turkey	Pınar and the SOS	"Yorgunum Anla"	59	10
23	Ireland	Eamonn Toal	"Millennium of Love"	92	6
24	Austria	The Rounder Girls	"All to You"	34	14

=== Spokespersons ===
Each participating broadcaster appointed a spokesperson who was responsible for announcing, in English or French, the votes for its respective country. As had been the case since the 1994 contest, the spokespersons were connected via satellite and appeared in vision during the broadcast; spokespersons at the 2000 contest are listed below.

1. Israel – Yoav Ginai
2. Netherlands – Marlayne
3. United Kingdom – Colin Berry
4. Estonia – Evelin Samuel
5. France – Marie Myriam
6. Romania – Andreea Marin
7. Malta – Valerie Vella
8. Norway – Marit Åslein
9. Russia – Zhanna Agalakova
10. Belgium – Thomas Van Hamme
11. Cyprus – Loukas Hamatsos
12. Iceland – Ragnheiður Elín Clausen
13. Spain – Hugo de Campos
14. Denmark – Michael Teschl
15. Germany – Axel Bulthaupt
16. Switzerland – Astrid von Stockar
17. Croatia – Marko Rašica
18. Sweden – Malin Ekander
19. Macedonia – Sandra Todorovska
20. Finland – Pia Mäkinen
21. Latvia – Lauris Reiniks
22. Turkey – Osman Erkan
23. Ireland – Derek Mooney
24. Austria – Dodo Roscic

== Detailed voting results ==
All countries were expected to use televoting to determine the points awarded by all countries, unless technological limitations in a country prevented a televote being held to a high standard, or where exceptional circumstances prevented a televote from being held. Jury voting was used in Russia due to an underdeveloped telephone system in the country, as well as in Macedonia, Romania and Turkey. The Netherlands and Latvia had originally planned to use televoting to determine their points, however the votes of their back-up juries were used instead. In the Netherlands, due to the Enschede fireworks disaster the broadcast of the contest was suspended partway through and thus a televote could not be held, while in Latvia televoting lines were overloaded resulting in viewers unable to vote and leaving organisers unable to accurately determine a valid result.

The announcement of the results from each country was conducted in the order in which they performed, with the spokespersons announcing their country's points in English or French in ascending order. The detailed breakdown of the points awarded by each country is listed in the tables below.

Detailed voting results of the Eurovision Song Contest 2000
Voting procedure used: 100% televoting 100% jury vote		Total score	Israel	Netherlands	United Kingdom	Estonia	France	Romania	Malta	Norway	Russia	Belgium	Cyprus	Iceland	Spain	Denmark	Germany	Switzerland	Croatia	Sweden	Macedonia	Finland	Latvia	Turkey	Ireland	Austria
Contestants	Israel	7					6														1					
Contestants	Netherlands	40	8				2		5			8	5	1	4		1		2					3	1	
Contestants	United Kingdom	28	1			2		3	6				3						4				3	6		
Contestants	Estonia	98	6	7	4			6	7	4		2	6	5		4	5		6	6		8	10	2	7	3
Contestants	France	5		2							3															
Contestants	Romania	25									6								7		**12**					
Contestants	Malta	73	3	1	2	1		7		2	8	1	8		1	3	3		8	3	8		4	5	3	2
Contestants	Norway	57	7		3	3			3					7		7				7			6	10	4	
Contestants	Russia	155	10		8	10	5	**12**	**12**	8		7	**12**	8	5	6	4	2	**12**	5	7	5			10	7
Contestants	Belgium	2																			2					
Contestants	Cyprus	8							1										3		4					
Contestants	Iceland	45	5			6				7						**12**				8			7			
Contestants	Spain	18						5			2		10					1								
Contestants	Denmark	**195**	**12**	10	**12**	8	7	1	8	10	**12**	10	4	**12**	10		**12**	10		**12**		10	**12**	1	**12**	10
Contestants	Germany	96		8	5		10			3	4	6		6	**12**	2		**12**	1			2	8		5	**12**
Contestants	Switzerland	14		6							5												2			1
Contestants	Croatia	70					8	8			10				2		6	6			10	6		8		6
Contestants	Sweden	88			6	5	1		4	5		5		4	6	10	8	3			6	7		**12**	6	
Contestants	Macedonia	29						10			7		2						10							
Contestants	Finland	18		5		7		4												2						
Contestants	Latvia	136	4	4	7	**12**	3			**12**	1	**12**	1	10	7	8	7	7		10	3	**12**			8	8
Contestants	Turkey	59		**12**			**12**			1		3				1	10	5		1	5	4				5
Contestants	Ireland	92	2	3	10	4	4	2	10	6		4	7	2	3	5		8	5	4		1	1	7		4
Contestants	Austria	34			1				2					3	8		2	4				3	5	4	2	

=== 12 points ===
The below table summarises how the maximum 12 points were awarded from one country to another. The winning country is shown in bold. Denmark received the maximum score of 12 points from eight countries, with Latvia and Russia receiving four sets of 12 points each, Germany receiving three sets, Turkey receiving two, and Iceland, Romania and Sweden each receiving one maximum score.

Distribution of 12 points awarded at the Eurovision Song Contest 2000
N.	Contestant	Nation(s) giving 12 points
8	**Denmark**	Germany, Iceland, Ireland, Israel, Latvia, Russia, Sweden, United Kingdom
4	Latvia	Belgium, Estonia, Finland, Norway
4	Russia	Croatia, Cyprus, Malta, Romania
3	Germany	Austria, Spain, Switzerland
2	Turkey	France, Netherlands
1	Iceland	Denmark
1	Romania	Macedonia
1	Sweden	Turkey

== Broadcasts ==
Each participating broadcaster was required to relay live and in full the contest via television. Non-participating EBU member broadcasters were also able to relay the contest as "passive participants"; any passive countries wishing to participate in the following year's event were also required to provide a live broadcast of the contest or a deferred broadcast within 24 hours. Broadcasters were able to send commentators to provide coverage of the contest in their own native language and to relay information about the artists and songs to their viewers. These commentators were typically sent to the venue to report on the event, and were able to provide commentary from small booths constructed at the back of the venue.

In addition to the broadcasts by EBU members, the contest was also available on the internet for the first time in its history. Sponsored by Microsoft, a webcast of the contest was available on 18 European MSN sites as well as in the United States, Canada and Australia.

Known details on the broadcasts in each country, including the specific broadcasting stations and commentators, are shown in the tables below.

Broadcasters and commentators in participating countries
Country	Broadcaster	Channel(s)	Commentator(s)	Ref.
Austria	ORF	ORF 1	Andi Knoll	
Austria	ORF	FM4	Stermann & Grissemann	
Belgium	RTBF	La Une	Jean-Pierre Hautier	
Belgium	VRT	TV1	André Vermeulen and Anja Daems	
Croatia	HRT	HRT 1		
Cyprus	CyBC	RIK Dyo		
Denmark	DR	DR1	Keld Heick	
Estonia	ETV		Marko Reikop	
Estonia	ER	Raadio 2		
Finland	YLE	TV1	Jani Juntunen	
Finland	YLE	Radio Suomi	Iris Mattila and Tarja Närhi	
France	France Télévision	France 3 (Note: Additional deferred broadcast on TV5 Europe on 14 May at 01:05 (CEST))	Julien Lepers	
Germany	ARD	Das Erste	Peter Urban	
Iceland	RÚV	Sjónvarpið	Gísli Marteinn Baldursson	
Ireland	RTÉ	RTÉ One	Marty Whelan	
Ireland	RTÉ	RTÉ Radio 1	Larry Gogan	
Israel	IBA	Channel 1		
Latvia	LTV		Kārlis Streips	
Malta	PBS	TVM		
Netherlands	NOS	Nederland 2 (Note: The live broadcast on Nederland 2 was suspended partway through in order to provide emergency news coverage of the Enschede fireworks disaster. The contest was later broadcast in a summary format lasting one hour and fifty minutes on 12 June 2000 at 13:50 (CEST).)	Willem van Beusekom	
Netherlands	NCRV	Radio 2 (Note: The live broadcast on Radio 2 was suspended partway through in order to provide emergency news coverage of the Enschede fireworks disaster.)	Hijlco Span	
Netherlands	~~TROS~~	~~Radio 3~~ (Note: The planned broadcast on Radio 3 was cancelled due to the Enschede fireworks disaster.)	~~André van Duin and Ferry de Groot~~ (Note: As the characters Dik Voormekaar and Mr. De Groot.)	
Norway	NRK	NRK1	Jostein Pedersen	
Norway	NRK	NRK P1	Stein Dag Jensen	
Romania	TVR	TVR 1	Andreea Marin	
Romania	ROR	Radio România Actualități	Ștefan Naftanailă	
Russia	ORT		Tatyana Godunova and Aleksey Zhuravlev	
Spain	TVE	La Primera (Note: Additional live broadcast on TVE Internacional)	José Luis Uribarri	
Sweden	SVT	SVT2 (Note: Additional live broadcast on SVT Europa)	Pernilla Månsson Colt and Christer Lundh	
Sweden	SR	SR P4	Carolina Norén	
Switzerland	SRG SSR	SF 2	Sandra Studer	
Switzerland	SRG SSR	TSR 1	Jean-Marc Richard	
Switzerland	SRG SSR	TSI 1	Jonathan Tedesco	
Turkey	TRT	TRT 1 (Note: Additional live broadcast on TRT Int)	Ömer Önder	
United Kingdom	BBC	BBC One (Note: Additional live broadcast on BBC Prime)	Terry Wogan	
United Kingdom	BBC	BBC Radio 2	Ken Bruce	

Broadcasters and commentators in non-participating countries
Country	Broadcaster	Channel(s)	Commentator(s)	Ref.
Australia	SBS	SBS TV (Note: Deferred broadcast on 14 May at 20:30 (AEST))		
Canada	TV5	TV5 Québec Canada (Note: Deferred broadcast at 00:15 (EDT))		
Falkland Islands	BFBS	BFBS Television		
Faroe Islands	SvF		Keld Heick	
Greece	ERT		Dafni Bokota	
Japan	NHK	NHK BS2 (Note: Delayed broadcast on 14 July 2000 at 19:35 (JST))		
Lithuania	LRT	LRT	Darius Užkuraitis	
Poland	TVP	TVP1	Artur Orzech	
Portugal	RTP	RTP1 (Note: Deferred broadcast at 23:00 (WEST); additional live broadcast on RTP Internacional)	Eládio Clímaco	
Slovenia	RTVSLO	SLO 1		
Yugoslavia	RTS	RTS 3K (Note: Deferred broadcast in a shortened format on 19 May 2000 at 12:30 (CEST))		

== Other awards ==
The Barbara Dex Award, created in 1997 by fansite House of Eurovision, was awarded to the performer deemed to have been the "worst dressed" among the participants. The winner in 2000 was Belgium's representative Nathalie Sorce, as determined by visitors to the House of Eurovision website.

== Notes and references ==
=== Bibliography ===
- Murtomäki, Asko (2007). Finland 12 points! Suomen Euroviisut (in Finnish). Helsinki, Finland: Teos. ISBN 951-851-106-3.
- O'Connor, John Kennedy (2010). The Eurovision Song Contest: The Official History (2nd ed.). London, United Kingdom: Carlton Books. ISBN 978-1-84732-521-1.
- Roxburgh, Gordon (2026). Songs for Europe: The United Kingdom at the Eurovision Song Contest. Vol. Five: The 2000s. Prestatyn, United Kingdom: Telos Publishing. ISBN 978-1-84583-247-6.
- Thorsson, Leif; Verhage, Martin (2006). Melodifestivalen genom tiderna : de svenska uttagningarna och internationella finalerna [Melodifestivalen through the ages: the Swedish selections and international finals] (in Swedish). Stockholm, Sweden: Premium Publishing. pp. 266–267. ISBN 91-89136-29-2.
