= Alexandros Panayi =

Cypriot singer

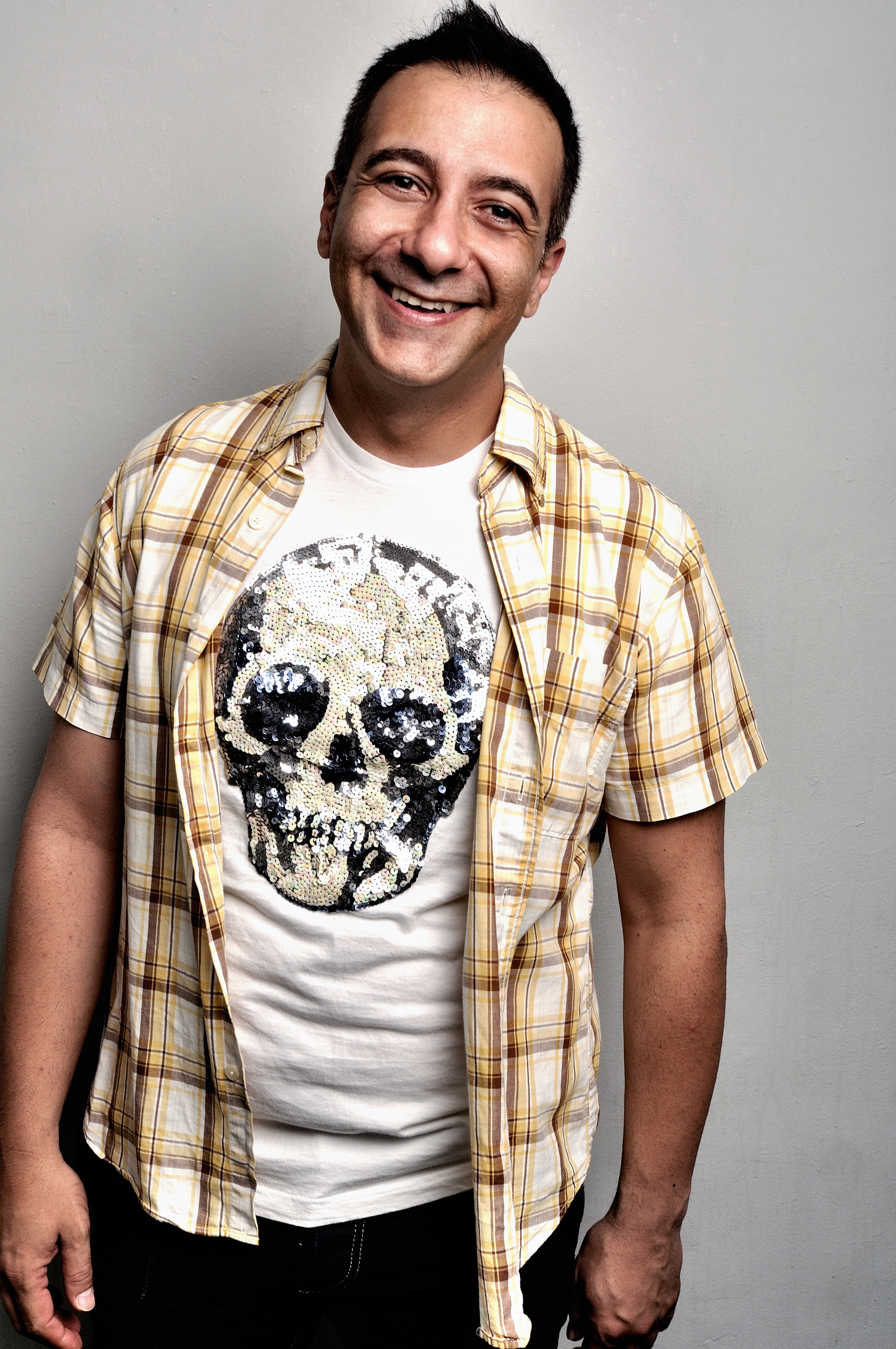
- Alex Panayi in 2011

Background information
- Born: Alexandros Panayi; 24 June 1970 (age 55)
- Origin: Nicosia, Cyprus
- Occupation: Singer

Alexandros Panayi (Greek: Αλέξανδρος Παναγή, also known as Alex Panayi, born 24 June 1970), is a Greek-Cypriot singer, composer, lyricist, producer, vocal coach, and vocal arranger. He is best known for having represented Cyprus at the Eurovision Song Contest in 1995 and 2000.

== Early life and education ==
Panayi grew up in a family of musicians and artists, and took his first musical steps under the guidance of his father Panayiotis Panayi (founder of the first symphony orchestra in Cyprus), and his mother Klairy Panayi (acclaimed Cypriot pianist). By the age of 18 he had already established himself as one of the leading singers and songwriters of his country, moving on to study music at the Berklee College of Music in Boston, Massachusetts, sponsored by the Fulbright Scholarship (BMus, Honors). During his five-year stay in the United States he had the opportunity to perform with artists such as Gary Burton, Peter Erskine, The Manhattan Transfer, The New York Voices and Billy Joel. He also toured the US as a member of The Vocal Summit – an a capella free improvisation vocal group – gaining the "Outstanding Musicianship Award" from the International Association of Jazz Educators (IAJE).

== Eurovision Song Contest ==
Panayi's involvement with the Eurovision Song Contest includes:

- backing vocals for the 1989 Cypriot entry "Apopse As Vrethoume";
- Performing the song "Pistevo" in the 1990 Cypriot National Final. (3rd place);
- backing vocals for Elena Patroklou in the 1991 Cypriot entry "SOS";
- Performing the song "Gia Sena Tragoudo" in the 1993 Cypriot National Final (3rd place);
- soloist and composer for the 1995 Cypriot entry "Sti Fotia";
- performing the duet, "Fterougisma" with Marlen Angelidou in the 1998 Cypriot National Final (2nd place);
- performer of the 2000 Cypriot entry "Nomiza" as a member of the vocal duo Voice (alongside Christina Argyri);
- vocal director and backing vocalist for Helena Paparizou's song "My Number One" which won the 2005 contest.
- stage director for 2006 Maltese entry "I do" performed by Fabrizio Faniello;
- vocal coach for the 2006 Greek entry "Everything" performed by Anna Vissi;
- Performing the song "There Is Love" in the 2009 Cypriot National Final;
- Vocal director and backing vocalist for Sakis Rouvas in the 2009 Greek entry "This Is Our Night"
- producer of the song "Hamogela" by the group "Trimitonio" in the 2011 Greek National Final;
- vocal director and backing vocalist for 2012 Belarusian entry "We Are The Heroes";
- vocal director for the Azerbaijani entry "Hold Me" and Belarusian entry "Solayoh" in 2013;
- vocal director for the Russian entry "Shine" and Belarusian entry "Cheesecake" in 2014;
- composer, English lyricist, producer for the entry of Cyprus "I pio omorfi mera" at the Junior Eurovision Song Contest 2014;
- vocal director for 2015 Belarusian entry "Time";
- vocal director for 2016 Russian representative Sergey Lazarev;
- vocal director for 2017 Greek representative Demy and 2017 Azerbaijani representative Dihaj;
- vocal director for 2018 Belarusian representative Alekseev, 2018 Azerbaijan representative Aisel and 2018 Moldovan representatives Doredos;
- vocal director for 2019 Russian representative Sergey Lazarev;
- vocal director and life coach for Tural Turan X (Azerbaijan 2023)

== Musical work ==
Panayi currently lives in Nicosia, Cyprus where he directs his company, Silver Spotlight Productions, and also coaches and performs with Greece's leading artists including Peggy Zina Kostas Martakis and Anna Vissi. He is also a vocal producer and vocal coach in other European countries working with performers such as Helena Paparizou, Philipp Kirkorov, Kamaliya and with producers such as Bruce Lowe, Philipp Kirkorov, Dimitris Kontopoulos and Uwe Fahrenkrog. He has performed on occasion at the "Herodion" Theatre of the Acropolis and has been Regional Music Supervisor for Disney, Buena Vista. Panayi has been the official Greek voice of many Disney characters such as Tigger (only his singing voice) and has starred in more than 40 movies such as The Lion King II: Simba's Pride, Tarzan, Mulan, Brother Bear, and many TV shows – he has the role of Johnny in the Greek production of Disney's Johnny and the Sprites, Captain Monogram, Dad, Irving, Buford, Norm, Roger in Disney's Phineas and Ferb. In 1998 he performed the singing voice of Jethro in the first classic animated movie of DreamWorks, The Prince of Egypt. He has also performed in Musical Theatre productions in Athens such as Grease in the role of Kennickie, and the Nikos Karvelas musical Mala in the roles of Moses & Abraham. Panayi was producer and manager of the group Triimitonio releasing the album Triimitonio and the single "Hamogela" He is also the lead vocalist and co-producer of the album Native Hue (arranged by Matheson Bayley), featuring him reinterpreting several classic Eurovision songs through different genres. Panayi was a teacher of vocal arts at the "Fame Studio" free study music school in Athens, and assists various TV and live music shows as artistic director. He has participated in many TV shows in Greece and Cyprus as a vocal coach, judge, co-host and panellist – X-Factor, Get on Stage, DanSing for You, The Music Box ‘’Melodifestivalen’’ (STV)‘’Destination Eurovision’’ ‘’Your Face Sounds Familiar’’ ‘’Fame Story’’. He has written the script to, directed and written music and lyrics for the hit musicals Feggaromberdemata (Moon Tangles), Esmeralda, and Mia Mera Tou Dekemvri (A Day in December), all staged in Cyprus. He was commissioned by UNESCO to write a new musical to celebrate the presidency of Cyprus to the EU. The musical Di-mentia premiered in Paris on 15 October 2012. The musical Gourouniasmata for young viewers and their families premiered on 22 December 2012, played sold-out performances throughout Cyprus and preparations are under way to transfer the production to Athens, Greece and the former Soviet states, adapted in Russian. The sequel Gourouniasmata 2; Adventure in the Forest premiered in Nicosia 20 December 2013. In June 2012 he co-founded (with close collaborator and friend Katerina Christofidou) in Cyprus, an international production company, Silver Spotlight Productions (A.Panayi & K.Christofidou Productions LTD) offering services ranging from composition, staging, direction, choreography, organisation, artist management, big band and symphonic orchestration and recording, to full music (cd and live) and theatre composition and production. Silver Spotlight is the production company for the original hit musicals Di-Mentia, Gourouniasmata, Gourouniasmata 2 ‘’ Gourouniasmata 3’’ ‘’Amanda’’ ‘’My Snowman’’ ‘’Trash’’ ‘’The Child And The Tree’’ ‘’My Symphonic Snowman’’ and many projects including jingles, corporate events and special projects.

== Social contribution ==
Panayi is also known in Cyprus for his active role in fundraising for charity. He is a permanent volunteer for the Cyprus Anti-Cancer Society with many of his productions' proceeds going to their fund, and has acted in the official 2012 and 2013 TV spots. His experience with his mother's condition has also made him a vehement spokesman for Alzheimer's awareness. His musical Di-Mentia was based on this experience. He is a fervent advocate for the LGBTQI+ community with a passion for inspiring and encouraging people to embrace their true self and values.

== Discography ==
- "Rendez – Vous" EP 1990 (performer)
- "Nostalgia" – LP 1991 (performer)
- "Ars Musica" CD 1992 (performer)
- "Sti Fotia" CD Single 1995 Sony BMG (composer, author. performer)
- "Nomiza" CD Single 2000 V2 (composer, author, performer)
- "Eurovision 2000 compilation" Double CD 2000 EBU (composer, author, performer)
- "Mala – i mousiki tou anemou" Double CD Soundtrack 2002 Sony BMG (performer, vocal director)
- "Native Hue" CD 2004 (performer, producer, composer, author)
- "Feggaromberdemata" CD Single 2008 (composer, performer, producer)
- "Triimitonio" CD 2010 WARNER (producer, composer)
- "Hamogela" WARNER digital Single 2011 (producer)
- "A Day in December" Soundtrack CD 2011 (composer, author, performer, producer)
- "Di-Mentia" Soundtrack CD 2012 SILVER SPOTLIGHT (composer, performer, producer)
- "Gourouniasmata" Soundtrack CD 2012 SILVER SPOTLIGHT (composer, producer)
- "Gourouniasmata 2: Adventure in the Forest" Soundtrack CD 2013 SILVER SPOTLIGHT (composer, producer)
- "I Pio Omorfi Mera" CD single Cypriot entry, Junior Eurovision Song Contest 2014 SILVER SPOTLIGHT Single (composer, lyricist, producer)
- "Gourouniasmata 3: Animal Academy" Soundtrack CD 2014 SILVER SPOTLIGHT (composer, producer)
- "Gourouniasmata: The Concert" Compilation CD 2015 SILVER SPOTLIGHT (composer, producer)
- "O Hionanthropos Mou" – My Snowman Soundtrack CD 2016 SILVER SPOTLIGHT (composer, producer, performer)
- "T.R.A.S.H Apodrasi Apo Ti Skoupidopoli" – Escape from Garbageville Soundtrack CD 2018 SILVER SPOTLIGHT (composer, producer)
- "To Paidi Kai To Dentro" - Soundtrack CD 2019 SILVER SPOTLIGHT (composer, producer, performer)

== Languages ==
Panayi speaks fluently Greek, English, and French. He also has a basic knowledge of Italian and Spanish.

Preceded by Evridiki with Ime Anthropos Ki Ego	Cyprus in the Eurovision Song Contest; 1995	Succeeded by Constantinos Christoforou with Mono Yia Mas
Preceded by Marlain Angelidou with Tha 'Ne Erotas	Cyprus in the Eurovision Song Contest; 2000 (as Voice)	Succeeded by ONE with Gimme
