= Olsen Brothers =

Danish rock/pop music duo

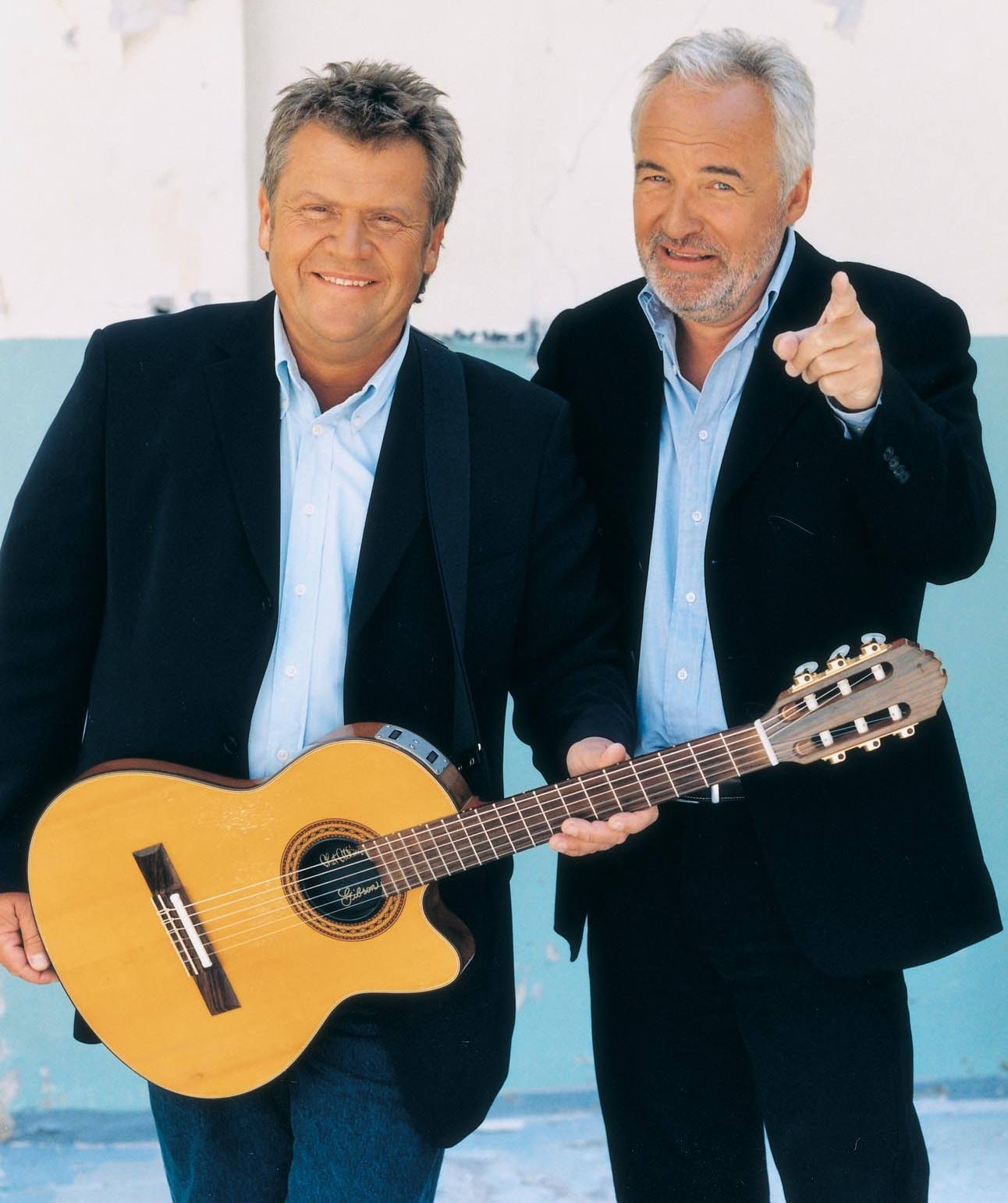
- Noller (left) and Jørgen Olsen (right)

Background information
- Origin: Odense, Denmark
- Years active: 1972–2019
- Past members: Jørgen Olsen; Niels "Noller" Olsen
- Website: http://www.olsen-brothers.dk/

Olsen Brothers (Danish: Brødrene Olsen) were a Danish rock/pop music duo, formed by brothers Jørgen (born 15 March 1950) and Niels "Noller" Olsen (born 13 April 1954), both from Odense, who won the Eurovision Song Contest 2000. They formed their first band, The Kids, in 1965. The Kids warmed up for The Kinks in the K.B. Hallen in 1965 and released their first single in 1967.

== Career ==
Both Jørgen and Niels Olsen participated in the musical Hair at the Cirkusbygningen in Copenhagen in March 1971, and went on tour afterwards throughout Denmark, Norway and Sweden.

The Olsen Brothers' first album was released in 1972; in total they have released 13 albums. Some of the biggest hit singles include "Angelina" (1972), "For What We Are" (1973), "Julie" (1977), "San Francisco" (1978), "Dans Dans Dans" (1979), "Marie, Marie" (1982), "Neon Madonna" (1985), "Wings Of Love" (2000), "We Believe In Love" (2001), "Look Up Look Down" (performed with Cliff Richard) (2009) and "Brothers To Brothers" (2013).

The Olsen Brothers have sold approximately 3.2 million albums, 1.5 million singles and 2.7 million compilations. They have a two-voice harmony, and among their “fans" are Cliff Richard and Björn Ulvaeus, who both call the Olsen Brothers the "European Everly Brothers".

=== Dansk Melodi Grand Prix and Eurovision participation ===
The Olsen Brothers, and, on occasion, Jørgen Olsen on his own, took part in a number of annual competitions known as Dansk Melodi Grand Prix, the winner of which would represent Denmark in the Eurovision Song Contest.

Participations in Dansk Melodi Grand Prix
Year	Song	Position	Points	Notes
1978	"San Francisco"	2nd	37	As Olson Brothers
1979	"Dans dans dans"	8th	32	As Olsen Brothers
1980	"Laila"	5th	61	As Olsen Brothers
1986	"Fællessang i parken"	6-10th	-	As Olsen Brothers
1989	"Fugle"	3rd	28	Jørgen Olsen (solo)
1990	"Berlin"	3rd	25.676	Jørgen Olsen (solo)
2000	"Smuk som et stjerneskud" "Fly on the Wings of Love" (in English)	1st	58	As Olsen Brothers; Represented Denmark in Eurovision 2000
2005	"Little Yellow Radio"	2nd	52	As Olsen Brothers
2007	"Vi elsker bare danske piger"	7th	-	Jørgen Olsen (solo)

==== DMGP 2000 and Eurovision Song Contest 2000 ====
They won the annual Dansk Melodi Grand Prix song competition in 2000 in Copenhagen, and went on to represent Denmark in the Eurovision Song Contest 2000 in Stockholm. where they won with the song "Fly on the Wings of Love" (translated from the Danish "Smuk som et Stjerneskud" (literally translated as "Beautiful as a Shooting Star"). At one stage, they sold 100,000 copies in one day in Denmark; they became the second Danish act to win the competition. On the day of their victory, Jørgen Olsen was 50 years and 61 days of age, making him the oldest artist to win the contest. However, he only held the record for one year, as Dave Benton triumphed in 2001 at the age of 50 years and 101 days. The combined ages of The Olsen Brothers make them the oldest aged act ever to win the contest.

They opened the Eurovision Song Contest 2001 in Copenhagen with a short reprise of their winning song from the previous year, followed by a full performance of their new release, "Walk Right Back".

==== Later years ====
In 2005 for the first time since their victory, they re-entered the Danish Melodi Grand Prix, the national pre-selection for the Eurovision contest, with the song "Little Yellow Radio". It was widely reported that they hoped to repeat their triumph; however, this time they had to settle for second place, finishing behind Jakob Sveistrup.

Their song "Fly on the Wings of Love" was nominated as one of the 14 finalists for Congratulations: 50 Years of the Eurovision Song Contest, held in Copenhagen, Denmark on 22 October 2005. They performed the song at the event, finishing 6th overall from 14 songs. The winner was "Waterloo" by ABBA.

In 2019, the brothers called a hiatus to their musical career after Niels was diagnosed with brain cancer. However, Niels was declared cancer-free by the end of 2020, in a development that was described as "against the odds". He has not ruled out returning to music in the future.

Jørgen performed "Fly on the Wings of Love" at the Eurovision Song Contest 2025 in Basel as an interval act to commemorate the twenty-fifth anniversary of the triumph in Stockholm.

== Discography ==
=== Albums ===
- Olsen (1972)
- For What We Are (1973)
- For the Children of the World (1973)
- Back on the Tracks (1976)
- You're the One (1977)
- San Francisco (1978)
- Dans - Dans - Dans (1979)
- Rockstalgi (1987)
- Det Stille Ocean (1990)
- Greatest and Latest (1994)
- Angelina (1999)
- Wings of Love (2000)
- The Story of Brødrene Olsen (2000)
- Rockstalgi (2001)
- Neon Madonna (2001)
- Walk Right Back (2001)
- Songs (2002)
- Weil Nur Die Liebe Zählt (2003)
- More Songs (2003)
- Our New Songs (2005)
- Celebration (2005)
- Respect (2008)
- Wings of Eurovision (2010)
- Brothers to Brothers (2013)

=== Charting singles ===
List of singles, with selected chart positions
Title	Year	Chart positions									Album
Title	Year	DEN	AUT	BEL VL	GER	NLD	NOR	SWE	SWI	UK	Album
"Fly on the Wings of Love"	2000	1	11	16	7	45	5	1	17	160	Wings of Love
"Walk Right Back"	2001	—	—	—	—	—	—	29	—	—	Walk Right Back

== See also ==
- Dansk Melodi Grand Prix
- Dansk Melodi Grand Prix winners

Awards and achievements
Preceded by (Sweden) Charlotte Nilsson with "Take Me to Your Heaven"	Winner of the Eurovision Song Contest; 2000	Succeeded by (Estonia) Tanel Padar, Dave Benton and 2XL with "Everybody"
Preceded by Michael Teschl and Trine Jepsen with "This Time I Mean It"	Denmark in the Eurovision Song Contest; 2000	Succeeded by Rollo & King with "Never Ever Let You Go"
