= Cyprus in the Eurovision Song Contest 2000 =

- Eurovision Song Contest 2000
- Participating broadcaster: Cyprus Broadcasting Corporation (CyBC)
- Country: Cyprus
- Selection process: Diagonismós Tragoudioú Giourovízion 2000
- Selection date: 16 February 2000

Competing entry
- Song: "Nomiza"
- Artist: Voice
- Songwriters: Alexandros Panayi; Silvia M. Klemm

Placement
- Final result: 21st, 8 points

Participation chronology

Cyprus was represented at the Eurovision Song Contest 2000 with the song "Nomiza", written by Alexandros Panayi and Silvia M. Klemms, and performed by the duo Voice, consisting of Christina Argyri and Alexandros Panayi. The Cypriot participating broadcaster, the Cyprus Broadcasting Corporation (CyBC), selected its entry through a national final.

Eleven songs competed in the national final, held on 16 February 2000, where a panel selected the winning song. Voice performed 11th at Eurovision and at the close of the voting process, finished in 21st place, receiving eight points.

== Background ==
Prior to the 2000 contest, the Cyprus Broadcasting Corporation (CyBC) had participated in the Eurovision Song Contest representing Cyprus 18 times since its first entry in 1981. It then participated yearly, only missing the 1988 contest when its selected song "Thimame" by Yiannis Dimitrou was disqualified for being previously released. To this point, its best placing was fifth, which it achieved twice: in 1982 with the song "Mono i agapi" performed by Anna Vissi and in 1997 with "Mana mou" performed by Hara and Andreas Constantinou. Its least successful result was in 1986 when it placed last with the song "Tora zo" by Elpida, receiving only four points in total.

== Before Eurovision ==
=== Diagonismós Tragoudioú Giourovízion 2000 ===
==== Competing entries ====
The Cyprus Broadcasting Corporation (CyBC) opened a submission period for Cypriot artists and composers to submit songs until 7 January 2000. By the end of the submission period, 58 entries had been submitted. On 23 January 2000, in radio room one of the CyBC studios, a 12-member jury listened to the received submissions and were tasked with choosing ten songs to compete in the national final. However, eleven songs were ultimately chosen.

==== Final ====
The final was broadcast live at 21:00 EET on RIK 2 on 16 February 2000 in a show titled Diagonismós Tragoudioú Giourovízion 2000 (Greek: Διαγωνισμός Τραγουδιού Γιουροβίζιον 2000). The contest was held at the Nea Leoforos Nightclub in Limassol, and was hosted by Loukas Hamatsos. The winner was chosen by 21-member jury panel, which included Eurovision 1999 winner Charlotte Nilsson, and Lina Kawar who was a backing singer for Cyprus in 1997 and in 1999. Nilsson was also featured as a guest singer.

At the close of voting, "Nomiza" performed by Christina Argyri and Alexandros Panayi received the most votes and was selected as the Cypriot entry.

Final – 16 February 2000
R/O	Artist	Song	Songwriter(s)	Points	Place
1	Marina Solonos	"Eimai akoma edo" (Είμαι ακόμα εδώ)	Marina Solonos	148	3
2	Annie	"Na m'agapas" (Να μ’αγαπάς)	Kyriakos Petousis	131	5
3	Maria Amman	"Fones" (Φωνές)	Thalia Kounouni	87	10
4	Marilia Perikleous and Demetris Mouhtaroudis	"Trikymia" (Τρικυμία)	Demetris Mouhtaroudis, Kyriakos Pastidis	93	9
5	Chrysanthos Chrysanthou	"An" (Αν)	Chrysanthos Chrysantho	78	11
6	Alexandros Panayi and Christina Argyri	"Nomiza" (Νόμιζα)	Alexandros Panayi	225	1
7	Lefki Stylianou	"Antio, loipon" (Αντίο, λοιπόν)	Lefki Stylianou	94	8
8	Antonia Orthanou	"Sti gi eirini" (Στη γη ειρήνη)	Dimitris Konstantinou, Niki Spyropoulou	100	7
9	Marian Georgiou and Kostas Kountos	"Paradeisos" (Παράδεισος)	Marian Georgiou	145	4
10	Giorgos Gavriel	"Volt" (Βολτ)	Giorgos Gavriel	122	6
11	Haroula Pirta	"Ki akoma s'agapo" (Κι ακόμα σ’αγαπώ)	Giorgos Adamou, Giorgos Serdaris	184	2

Detailed Jury Votes
R/O	Song	Jury																					Total
R/O	Song	1	2	3	4	5	6	7	8	9	10	11	12	13	14	15	16	17	18	19	20	21	Total
1	"Eimai akoma edo"	12	9	10	7	12	4	1	7	8	9	3	9	6	2	5	9	10	3	4	10	8	148
2	"Na m'agapas"	4	8	5	8	8	3	12	8	5	7	5	10	7	1	6	10	2	8	8	3	3	131
3	"Fones"	1	4	3	2	2	5	3	1	6	3	8	5	5	4	7	2	9	5	1	5	6	87
4	"Trikymia"	3	1	2	3	6	1	2	3	9	2	2	4	8	7	10	3	3	1	6	8	9	93
5	"An"	5	3	1	1	3	7	6	2	3	5	7	1	4	5	3	1	7	2	3	2	7	78
6	"Nomiza"	10	12	12	12	10	10	10	10	7	12	12	12	10	12	12	12	4	10	12	12	12	225
7	"Antio, loipon"	6	5	6	6	4	6	4	6	4	1	4	3	1	9	1	4	1	6	7	6	4	94
8	"Sti gi eirini"	2	6	4	5	9	2	5	9	12	4	6	2	2	3	8	5	5	7	2	1	1	100
9	"Paradeisos"	7	7	9	4	7	9	8	4	2	10	10	6	12	10	2	8	6	9	9	4	2	145
10	"Volt"	8	2	7	9	1	8	7	5	1	6	1	8	9	6	4	7	12	4	5	7	5	122
11	"Ki akoma s'agapo"	9	10	8	10	5	12	9	12	10	8	9	7	3	8	9	6	8	12	10	9	10	184

== At Eurovision ==
The Eurovision Song Contest 2000 took place at the Globe Arena in Stockholm, Sweden, on 13 May 2000. According to the Eurovision rules, the 24-country participant list for the contest was composed of: the winning country from the previous year's contest; the 18 countries, other than the previous year's winner, which had obtained the highest average number of points over the last five contests; and any countries which had not participated in the previous year's content. Cyprus was one of the 18 countries with the highest average scores, and thus were permitted to participate. The running order for the contest was decided by a draw; Cyprus was assigned position 11, following Belgium and preceding Iceland. The performance included backing vocals by George Gabriel, Lina Kawar, Christina Lazarou, and Michael Moschou. At the end of the voting, Cyprus received only 8 points, placing 21st in the field of 24 countries. Due to poor results, Cyprus was not permitted to take part in the 2001 contest the next year; however, they were re-admitted for the following year.

=== Voting ===
The same voting system in use since 1975 was again implemented for this event, with each country providing 1–8, 10 and 12 points to the ten highest-ranking songs as determined by a selected jury or the viewing public through televoting, with countries not allowed to vote for themselves. This was the third contest to feature widespread public voting, and Cyprus opted to implement this method to determine which countries would receive their points, with an 8-member back-up jury assembled in case technical failures rendered the telephone votes invalid. The Cypriot televoting awarded its 12 points to Russia.

Points awarded to Cyprus
Score	Country
12 points	
10 points	
8 points	
7 points	
6 points	
5 points	
4 points	Macedonia
3 points	Croatia
2 points	
1 point	Malta

Points awarded by Cyprus
Score	Country
12 points	Russia
10 points	Spain
8 points	Malta
7 points	Ireland
6 points	Estonia
5 points	Netherlands
4 points	Denmark
3 points	United Kingdom
2 points	Macedonia
1 point	Latvia
