= Iceland in the Eurovision Song Contest 2000 =

- Eurovision Song Contest 2000
- Participating broadcaster: Ríkisútvarpið (RÚV)
- Country: Iceland
- Selection process: Söngvakeppni Sjónvarpsins 2000
- Selection date: 26 February 2000

Competing entry
- Song: "Tell Me!"
- Artist: August and Telma
- Songwriters: Örlygur Smári; Sigurður Örn Jónsson

Placement
- Final result: 12th, 45 points

Participation chronology

Iceland was represented at the Eurovision Song Contest 2000 with the song "Tell Me!", composed by Örlygur Smári, with lyrics by Sigurður Örn Jónsson, and performed by August and Telma, which are the artistic names of singers Einar Ágúst Víðisson and Telma Ágústsdóttir. The Icelandic participating broadcaster, Ríkisútvarpið (RÚV), selected its entry through Söngvakeppni Sjónvarpsins 2000. Five songs competed in the selection which was held on 26 February 2000. "Hvert sem er" performed by Einar Ágúst Víðisson and Telma Ágústsdóttir emerged as the winner exclusively through public televoting. The song was later translated from Icelandic to English for Eurovision and was titled "Tell Me!".

Iceland competed in the Eurovision Song Contest which took place on 13 May 2000. Performing as the opening entry for the show in position 2, Iceland placed twelfth out of the 24 participating countries, scoring 45 points.

== Background ==
Prior to the 2000 Contest, Ríkisútvarpið (RÚV) had participated in the Eurovision Song Contest representing Iceland thirteen times since its first entry in 1986. Its best placing in the contest to this point was second, achieved in 1999 with the song "All Out of Luck" performed by Selma.

As part of its duties as participating broadcaster, RÚV organises the selection of its entry in the Eurovision Song Contest and broadcasts the event in the country. Between 1995 and 1999, the broadcaster opted to internally select its entry for the contest. For 2000, RÚV announced along with their participation confirmation that a national final would be used for the first time since 1994 to select its entry.

== Before Eurovision ==
=== Söngvakeppni Sjónvarpsins 2000 ===
Söngvakeppni Sjónvarpsins 2000 was the national final format developed by RÚV in order to select its entry for the Eurovision Song Contest 2000. On 19 December 1999, RÚV opened the submission period for interested songwriters to submit their entries until the deadline on 8 January 2000 and at the close of the submission deadline, 120 entries were received. A four-member selection committee consisting of Magnús Eiríksson, Eva Ásrún Albertsdóttir, Stefán Hilmarsson and Reynir Sigurðsson selected the top five entries, which were revealed by the broadcaster on 15 January 2000 and presented during the television programme Stutt í spunann, hosted by Hjálmar Hjálmarsson and Hera Björk Þórhallsdóttir, between 22 January and 19 February 2000.

The national final took place on 26 February 2000 during Stutt í spunann where the winner, "Hvert sem er" performed by Einar Ágúst Víðisson and Telma Ágústsdóttir, was determined solely by televoting.

7,476 votes were cast.

Final – 26 February 2000
R/O	Artist	Song	Songwriter(s)	Televote	Place
1	Halla Vilhjálmsdóttir	"Sta sta stam"	Sverrir Stromskjer	1,216	3
2	Örlygur Smári	"Segðu mér"	Sigurður Örn Jónsson, Örlygur Smári	411	4
3	Gúðrun Gunnarsdóttir	"Barnagæla"	Valgeir Skagfjörd	183	5
4	Einar Ágúst Víðisson and Telma Ágústsdóttir	"Hvert sem er"	Sigurður Örn Jónsson, Örlygur Smári	4,318	1
5	Páll Rósinkranz	"Söknuður"	Valgeir Skagfjörd	1,358	2

== At Eurovision ==
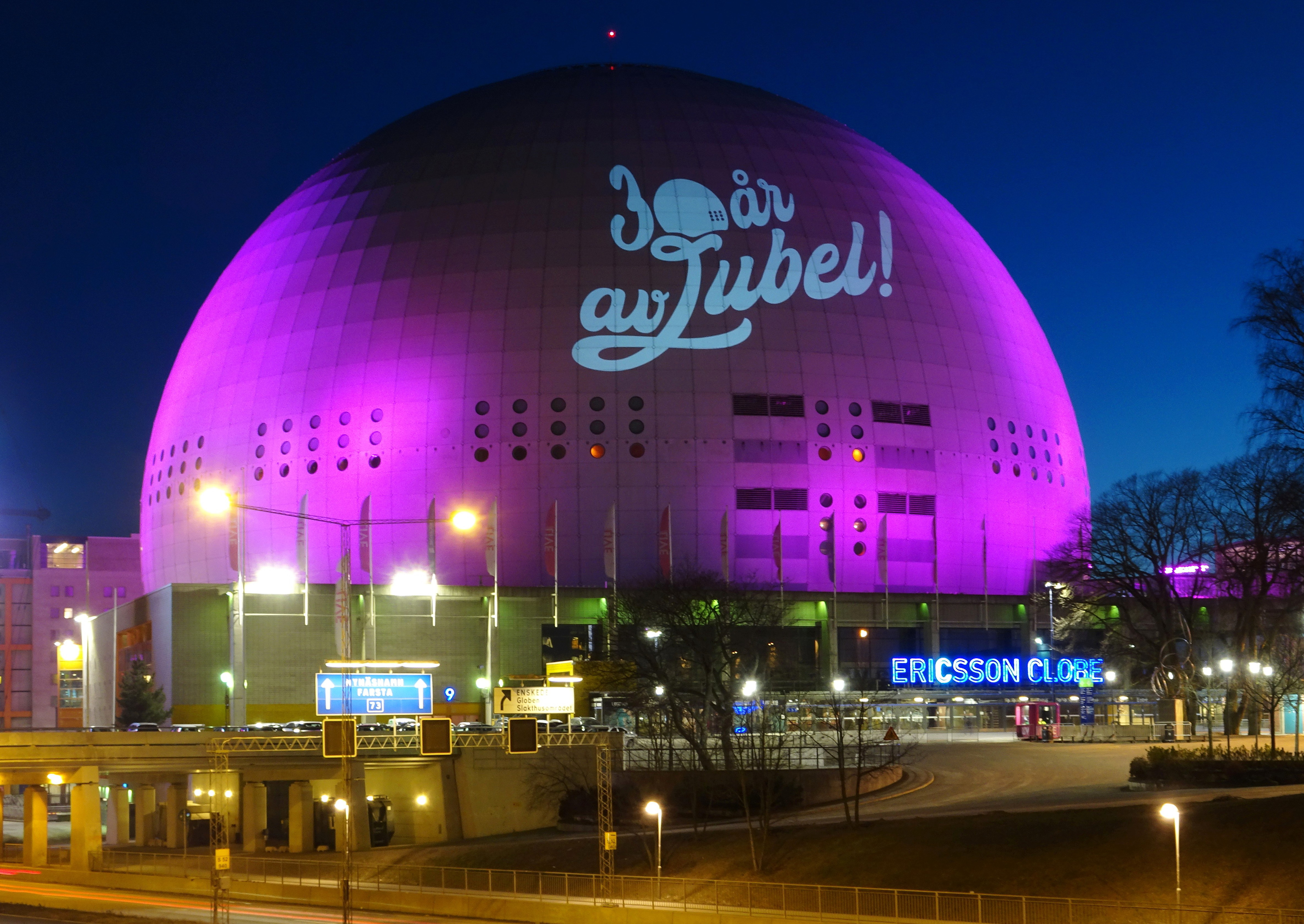
The Eurovision Song Contest 2000 took place at the Globe Arena in Stockholm, Sweden, on 13 May 2000.

According to Eurovision rules, the 24-country participant list for the contest was composed of: the previous year's winning country and host nation Sweden, "Big Four" countries, the thirteen countries, which had obtained the highest average points total over the preceding five contests, and any eligible countries which did not compete in the 1999 contest. On 21 November 1999, an allocation draw was held which determined the running order and Iceland was set to perform in position 12, following the entry from Cyprus and before the entry from Spain.

On 14 March 2000, it was revealed by the magazine Séð og heyrt that the song would be performed in English at the Eurovision Song Contest, titled "Tell Me!". Iceland finished in twelfth place with 45 points.

The show was broadcast in Iceland on RÚV with commentary by Gísli Marteinn Baldursson.

=== Voting ===
Below is a breakdown of points awarded to Iceland and awarded by Iceland in the contest. The nation awarded its 12 points to Denmark in the contest.

RÚV appointed Ragnheiður Elín Clausen as its spokesperson to announced the results of the Icelandic televote during the show.

Points awarded to Iceland
Score	Country
12 points	Denmark
10 points	
8 points	Sweden
7 points	Latvia; Norway
6 points	Estonia
5 points	Israel
4 points	
3 points	
2 points	
1 point	

Points awarded by Iceland
Score	Country
12 points	Denmark
10 points	Latvia
8 points	Russia
7 points	Norway
6 points	Germany
5 points	Estonia
4 points	Sweden
3 points	Austria
2 points	Ireland
1 point	Netherlands
