= Stefán Hilmarsson (singer) =

Icelandic singer and translator (born 1966)

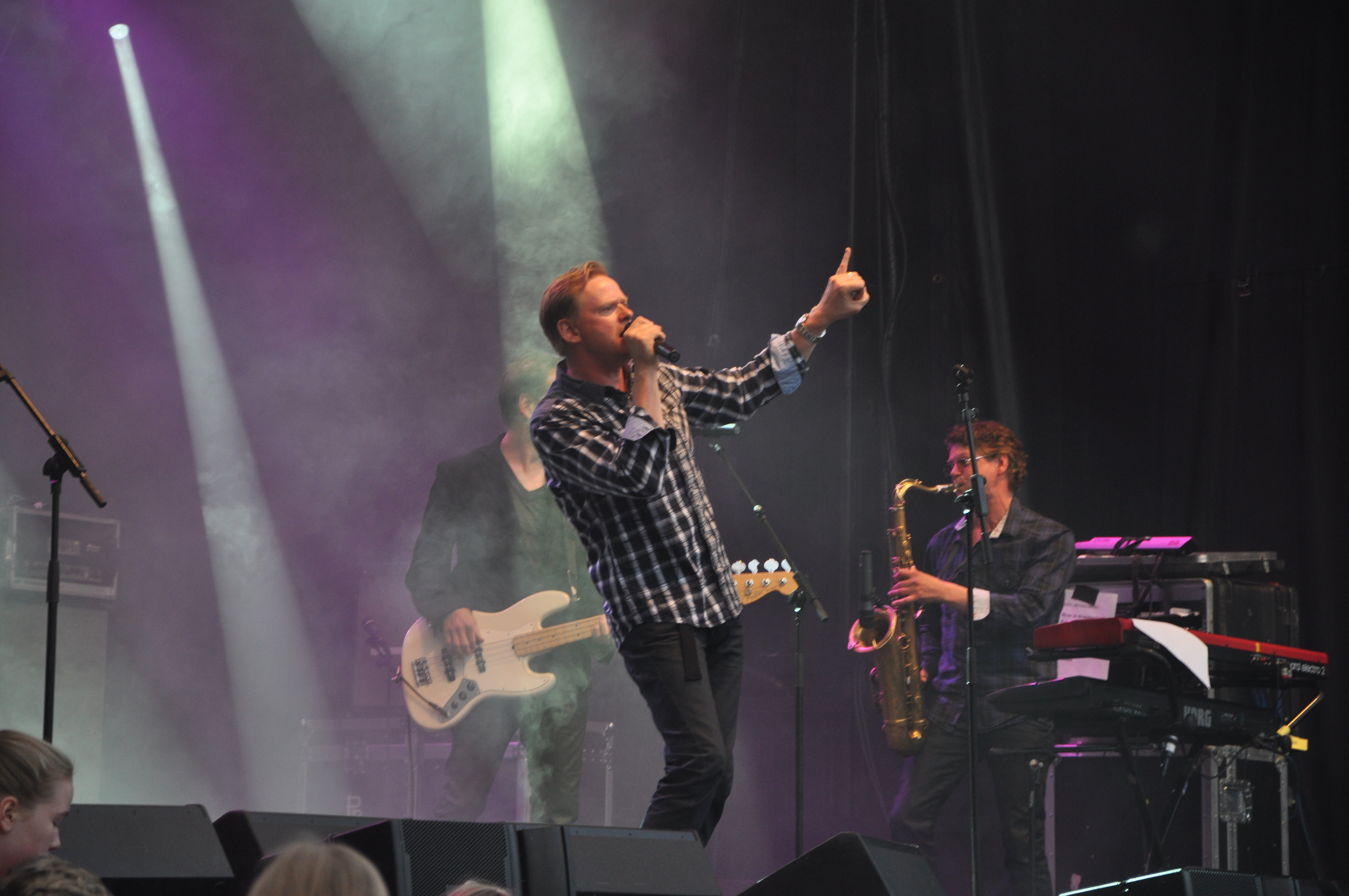
- Born: 26 June 1966 (age 60); Reykjavík, Iceland
- Website: stefanhilmarsson.is

Stefán Hilmarsson (born 26 June 1966) is an Icelandic singer and translator.

== Career ==
Stefán was born on 26 June 1966 in Reykjavík. He started his musical career in 1986 when he sang in the band Sniglabandið.

Stefán has represented Iceland in the Eurovision song contest twice, in 1988 with the song Þú og þeir and the band Beathoven. He also represtend Iceland in 1992 with the song Nina which he performed with Eyjólfur Kristjánsson.

Stefán released his first solo album Líf in 1993, he has since then released a total of nine solo albums.

Stefán has also translated a couple of animated movies and TV-series into Icelandic such as Goof Troop, The Little Mermaid and The Tigger Movie. Stefán also sang the soundtrack in the Icelandic versions of Tarzan and Brother Bear.

== Solo albums ==
- 1993: Líf
- 1996: Eins og er
- 1997: Popplín
- 2008: Ein handa þér
- 2009: Húm
- 2014: Í desember
- 2016: Úrvalslög
- 2025: Lítil jól
- 2026: Ár og Dagar
