= Finland in the Eurovision Song Contest =

- Eurovision Song Contest
- Participating broadcaster: Yleisradio (Yle)

Participation summary
- Appearances: 59 (51 finals)
- First appearance: 1961
- Highest placement: 1st: 2006
- Host: 2007
- Participation history: 1961; 1962; 1963; 1964; 1965; 1966; 1967; 1968; 1969; 1970; 1971; 1972; 1973; 1974; 1975; 1976; 1977; 1978; 1979; 1980; 1981; 1982; 1983; 1984; 1985; 1986; 1987; 1988; 1989; 1990; 1991; 1992; 1993; 1994; 1995; 1996; 1997; 1998; 1999; 2000; 2001; 2002; 2003; 2004; 2005; 2006; 2007; 2008; 2009; 2010; 2011; 2012; 2013; 2014; 2015; 2016; 2017; 2018; 2019; ~~2020~~; 2021; 2022; 2023; 2024; 2025; 2026

Related articles
- Uuden Musiikin Kilpailu

External links
- Yle Eurovision page
- Finland's page at Eurovision.com
- For the most recent participation see Finland in the Eurovision Song Contest 2026

Finland has been represented at the Eurovision Song Contest 59 times since its debut in 1961. The Finnish participating broadcaster in the contest is Yleisradio (Yle), which has often selected its entrant with a national final, since 2012 known as Uuden Musiikin Kilpailu. The country won the contest for the first – and to date only – time in 2006 with "Hard Rock Hallelujah" performed by Lordi. Its best result before then was achieved with "Tom Tom Tom" by Marion Rung in 1973, which placed sixth.

Finland has finished last in the contest eleven times, receiving nul points in 1963, 1965, and 1982. Since the introduction of the semi-finals in 2004, Finland has failed to reach the final eight times. In 2014, the country had its best result in eight years with "Something Better" by Softengine finishing 11th, a result that would be surpassed with "Dark Side" by Blind Channel, which came sixth in 2021, and later with "Cha Cha Cha" by Käärijä, which won the public vote and came second overall in 2023, the latter of which is Finland's second best result to date.

== Participation ==
Yleisradio (Yle) is a full member of the European Broadcasting Union (EBU), thus eligible to participate in the Eurovision Song Contest. It has participated in the contest representing Finland since its sixth edition in 1961.

== History ==
Before its 2006 victory, Finland was considered by many to be the under-achiever of the contest. Prior to 2006, it had placed last a total of eight times, three times with nul points. Finland's entry in 1982, "Nuku pommiin" by Kojo, was one of only fifteen songs to score no points since the modern scoring system was implemented in 1975. Due to poor results, Finland was relegated from taking part in 1995, 1997, 1999, 2001 and 2003.

In 2006, Finland won the contest with "Hard Rock Hallelujah" by the band Lordi, an entry that stood out from the Europop that had dominated the competition. The song scored the highest number of points in the history of the contest, with 292, a record that was later broken by Norway's Alexander Rybak in 2009.

In 2015, Finland finished last in the first semi-final with the shortest-ever Eurovision song, the one minute and 27 seconds "Aina mun pitää" performed by Pertti Kurikan Nimipäivät. Finland reached the final for the first time in four years in 2018, with Saara Aalto placing 25th. Finland experienced another non-qualification in 2019 with Darude and Sebastian Rejman finishing last in the semi-final.

In the 2020s, Finland has qualified to the final every year, including three top 10 finishes: a sixth place for Blind Channel in 2021, a second place for Käärijä in 2023, which is Finland's second best result to date, and another sixth place for Linda Lampenius and Pete Parkkonen in 2026.

All of Finland's entries were in English between 1973 and 1976, and since 2000 (with the exceptions of 2008, 2010, 2012, 2015, 2023, 2025, and 2026); both of these periods allowed submissions in any language. Finland's entries in 1990 and 2012 were in Swedish, which is an official language in the country alongside Finnish. All of Finland's other songs have been in Finnish.

== Participation overview ==
Table key
| 1 | First place |
| 2 | Second place |
| 3 | Third place |
| ◁ | Last place |
| ◇ | Entry selected but did not compete |
| † | Upcoming event |

| Year | Artist | Song | Language | Final | Points | Semi | Points |
|---|---|---|---|---|---|---|---|
| 1961 | Laila Kinnunen | "Valoa ikkunassa" | Finnish | 10 | 6 | No semi-finals | |
| 1962 | Marion Rung | "Tipi-tii" | Finnish | 7 | 4 | No semi-finals | |
| 1963 | Laila Halme | "Muistojeni laulu" | Finnish | 13 ◁ | 0 | No semi-finals | |
| 1964 | Lasse Mårtenson | "Laiskotellen" | Finnish | 7 | 9 | No semi-finals | |
| 1965 | Viktor Klimenko | "Aurinko laskee länteen" | Finnish | 15 ◁ | 0 | No semi-finals | |
| 1966 | Ann-Christine | "Playboy" | Finnish | 10 | 7 | No semi-finals | |
| 1967 | Fredi | "Varjoon – suojaan" | Finnish | 12 | 3 | No semi-finals | |
| 1968 | Kristina Hautala | "Kun kello käy" | Finnish | 16 ◁ | 1 | No semi-finals | |
| 1969 | Jarkko and Laura | "Kuin silloin ennen" | Finnish | 12 | 6 | No semi-finals | |
| 1971 | Markku Aro and Koivisto Sisters | "Tie uuteen päivään" | Finnish | 8 | 84 | No semi-finals | |
| 1972 | Päivi Paunu and Kim Floor | "Muistathan" | Finnish | 12 | 78 | No semi-finals | |
| 1973 | Marion Rung | "Tom Tom Tom" | English | 6 | 93 | No semi-finals | |
| 1974 | Carita | "Keep Me Warm" | English | 13 | 4 | No semi-finals | |
| 1975 | Pihasoittajat | "Old Man Fiddle" | English | 7 | 74 | No semi-finals | |
| 1976 | Fredi and the Friends | "Pump-Pump" | English | 11 | 44 | No semi-finals | |
| 1977 | Monica Aspelund | "Lapponia" | Finnish | 10 | 50 | No semi-finals | |
| 1978 | Seija Simola | "Anna rakkaudelle tilaisuus" | Finnish | 18 | 2 | No semi-finals | |
| 1979 | Katri Helena | "Katson sineen taivaan" | Finnish | 14 | 38 | No semi-finals | |
| 1980 | Vesa-Matti Loiri | "Huilumies" | Finnish | 19 ◁ | 6 | No semi-finals | |
| 1981 | Riki Sorsa | "Reggae O.K." | Finnish | 16 | 27 | No semi-finals | |
| 1982 | Kojo | "Nuku pommiin" | Finnish | 18 ◁ | 0 | No semi-finals | |
| 1983 | Ami Aspelund | "Fantasiaa" | Finnish | 11 | 41 | No semi-finals | |
| 1984 | Kirka | "Hengaillaan" | Finnish | 9 | 46 | No semi-finals | |
| 1985 | Sonja Lumme | "Eläköön elämä" | Finnish | 9 | 58 | No semi-finals | |
| 1986 | Kari | "Never the End" | Finnish | 15 | 22 | No semi-finals | |
| 1987 | Vicky Rosti | "Sata salamaa" | Finnish | 15 | 32 | No semi-finals | |
| 1988 | Boulevard | "Nauravat silmät muistetaan" | Finnish | 20 | 3 | No semi-finals | |
| 1989 | Anneli Saaristo | "La dolce vita" | Finnish | 7 | 76 | No semi-finals | |
| 1990 | Beat | "Fri?" | Swedish | 21 ◁ | 8 | No semi-finals | |
| 1991 | Kaija | "Hullu yö" | Finnish | 20 | 6 | No semi-finals | |
| 1992 | Pave | "Yamma Yamma" | Finnish | 23 ◁ | 4 | No semi-finals | |
| 1993 | Katri Helena | "Tule luo" | Finnish | 17 | 20 | Kvalifikacija za Millstreet | |
| 1994 | CatCat | "Bye Bye Baby" | Finnish, English | 22 | 11 | No semi-finals | |
| 1996 | Jasmine | "Niin kaunis on taivas" | Finnish | 23 ◁ | 9 | 22 | 26 |
| 1998 | Edea | "Aava" | Finnish | 15 | 22 | No semi-finals | |
| 2000 | Nina Åström | "A Little Bit" | English | 18 | 18 | No semi-finals | |
| 2002 | Laura | "Addicted to You" | English | 20 | 24 | No semi-finals | |
| 2004 | Jari Sillanpää | "Takes 2 to Tango" | English | Failed to qualify | | 14 | 51 |
| 2005 | Geir Rönning | "Why?" | English | Failed to qualify | | 18 | 50 |
| 2006 | Lordi | "Hard Rock Hallelujah" | English | 1 | 292 | 1 | 292 |
| 2007 | Hanna Pakarinen | "Leave Me Alone" | English | 17 | 53 | Host country | |
| 2008 | Teräsbetoni | "Missä miehet ratsastaa" | Finnish | 22 | 35 | 8 | 79 |
| 2009 | Waldo's People | "Lose Control" | English | 25 ◁ | 22 | 12 (Note: In 2009, Finland qualified through the back-up jury selection.) | 42 |
| 2010 | Kuunkuiskaajat | "Työlki ellää" | Finnish | Failed to qualify | | 11 | 49 |
| 2011 | Paradise Oskar | "Da Da Dam" | English | 21 | 57 | 3 | 103 |
| 2012 | Pernilla | "När jag blundar" | Swedish | Failed to qualify | | 12 | 41 |
| 2013 | Krista Siegfrids | "Marry Me" | English | 24 | 13 | 9 | 64 |
| 2014 | Softengine | "Something Better" | English | 11 | 72 | 3 | 97 |
| 2015 | Pertti Kurikan Nimipäivät | "Aina mun pitää" | Finnish | Failed to qualify | | 16 ◁ | 13 |
| 2016 | Sandhja | "Sing It Away" | English | Failed to qualify | | 15 | 51 |
| 2017 | Norma John | "Blackbird" | English | Failed to qualify | | 12 | 92 |
| 2018 | Saara Aalto | "Monsters" | English | 25 | 46 | 10 | 108 |
| 2019 | Darude feat. Sebastian Rejman | "Look Away" | English | Failed to qualify | | 17 ◁ | 23 |
| 2020 | Aksel ◇ | "Looking Back" ◇ | English ◇ | Contest cancelled (Note: The 2020 contest was cancelled due to the COVID-19 pandemic.) | | | |
| 2021 | Blind Channel | "Dark Side" | English | 6 | 301 | 5 | 234 |
| 2022 | The Rasmus | "Jezebel" | English | 21 | 38 | 7 | 162 |
| 2023 | Käärijä | "Cha Cha Cha" | Finnish | 2 | 526 | 1 | 177 |
| 2024 | Windows95man (Note: Features uncredited vocals by Henri Piispanen) | "No Rules!" | English | 19 | 38 | 7 | 59 |
| 2025 | Erika Vikman | "Ich komme" | Finnish | 11 | 196 | 3 | 115 |
| 2026 | Linda Lampenius and Pete Parkkonen | "Liekinheitin" | Finnish | 6 | 279 | 3 | 227 |
| 2027 | Confirmed intention to participate † | | | | | | |

== Hostings ==
| Year | Location | Venue | Presenters | Image |
|---|---|---|---|---|
| 2007 | Helsinki | Hartwall Arena | Jaana Pelkonen and Mikko Leppilampi | |

== Awards ==
=== Marcel Bezençon Awards ===
| Year | Category | Song | Performer | Final | Points | Host city | Ref. |
|---|---|---|---|---|---|---|---|
| 2002 | Fan Award | "Addicted to You" | Laura | 20 | 24 | (Estonia) Tallinn | |
| 2006 | Press Award | "Hard Rock Hallelujah" | Lordi | 1 | 292 | (Greece) Athens | |
| 2011 | Press Award | "Da Da Dam" | Paradise Oskar | 21 | 57 | (Germany) Düsseldorf | |

=== Winner by OGAE members ===
| Year | Song | Performer | Final result | Points | Host city | Ref. |
|---|---|---|---|---|---|---|
| 2026 | "Liekinheitin" | Linda Lampenius and Pete Parkkonen | 6 | 279 | (Austria) Vienna | |

=== You're a Vision Award ===
| Year | Performer | Host city | Ref. |
|---|---|---|---|
| 2023 | Käärijä | (United Kingdom) Liverpool | |

== Related involvement ==
=== Conductors ===
| Year | Conductor (Note: All conductors are of Finnish nationality unless otherwise noted.) | Notes | Ref. |
|---|---|---|---|
| 1961 | George de Godzinsky | | |
| 1962 | George de Godzinsky | | |
| 1963 | George de Godzinsky | | |
| 1964 | George de Godzinsky | | |
| 1965 | George de Godzinsky | | |
| 1966 | Ossi Runne | (Note: Conducted by George de Godzinsky at the national final.) | |
| 1967 | Ossi Runne | | |
| 1968 | Ossi Runne | | |
| 1969 | Ossi Runne | | |
| 1971 | Ossi Runne | | |
| 1972 | Ossi Runne | | |
| 1973 | Ossi Runne | | |
| 1974 | Ossi Runne | | |
| 1975 | Ossi Runne | | |
| 1976 | Ossi Runne | | |
| 1977 | Ossi Runne | | |
| 1978 | Ossi Runne | (Note: Conducted by Risto Hiltunen at the national final.) | |
| 1979 | Ossi Runne | | |
| 1980 | Ossi Runne | | |
| 1981 | Henrik Otto Donner | (Note: Only year between 1966 and 1989 where Finland participated and Ossi Runne was not their conductor; he instead provided television commentary. Runne still conducted at the national final.) | |
| 1982 | Ossi Runne | | |
| 1983 | Ossi Runne | | |
| 1984 | Ossi Runne | | |
| 1985 | Ossi Runne | | |
| 1986 | Ossi Runne | | |
| 1987 | Ossi Runne | | |
| 1988 | Ossi Runne | | |
| 1989 | Ossi Runne | | |
| 1990 | Olli Ahvenlahti | (Note: Conducted by Ossi Runne at the national final.) | |
| 1991 | Olli Ahvenlahti | | |
| 1992 | Olli Ahvenlahti | | |
| 1993 | Olli Ahvenlahti | | |
| 1994 | Olli Ahvenlahti | | |
| 1996 | Olli Ahvenlahti | | |
| 1998 | Olli Ahvenlahti | | |

=== Commentators and spokespersons ===
Over the years, Yle has had several experienced radio and television presenters as commentators. The Eurovision Song Contest has been broadcast in Finland from 1960 to 2001 and from 2021 onwards by Yle TV1 and from 2002 to 2019 by Yle TV2.

| Year | Channel | Finnish commentator | Swedish commentator | Spokesperson | Ref. |
|---|---|---|---|---|---|
| 1960 | Suomen Televisio | Aarno Walli | No broadcast | Did not participate | |
| 1961 | Suomen Televisio | Aarno Walli | No broadcast | Poppe Berg | |
| 1962 | Suomen Televisio | Aarno Walli | Jan Sederholm | Poppe Berg | |
| 1963 | Suomen Televisio | Aarno Walli | Jan Sederholm | Poppe Berg | |
| 1964 | Suomen Televisio | Aarno Walli | Unknown | Poppe Berg | |
| 1965 | TV-ohjelma 1 | Aarno Walli | Jerker Sundholm | Poppe Berg | |
| 1966 | TV-ohjelma 1 | Aarno Walli | Unknown | Poppe Berg | |
| 1967 | TV-ohjelma 1 | Aarno Walli | Unknown | Poppe Berg | |
| 1968 | TV-ohjelma 1 | Aarno Walli | Unknown | Poppe Berg | |
| 1969 | TV-ohjelma 1 | Aarno Walli | Unknown | Poppe Berg | |
| 1970 | No broadcast | | | Did not participate | |
| 1971 | TV-ohjelma 1 | Unknown | Matti Paalosmaa | No spokesperson | |
| 1972 | TV-ohjelma 1 | Unknown | Åke Grandell | No spokesperson | |
| 1973 | TV1 | Unknown | | No spokesperson | |
| 1974 | TV1 | Matti Paalosmaa | Åke Grandell | Aarre Elo | |
| 1975 | TV1 | Heikki Seppälä | No broadcast | Kaarina Pönniö | |
| 1976 | TV1 | Heikki Seppälä | No broadcast | Erkki Vihtonen | |
| 1977 | TV1 | Unknown | No broadcast | Kaarina Pönniö | |
| 1978 | TV1 | Unknown | No broadcast | Kaarina Pönniö | |
| 1979 | TV1 | Matti Paalosmaa | No broadcast | Kaarina Pönniö | |
| 1980 | TV1 | Heikki Harma | No broadcast | Kaarina Pönniö | |
| 1981 | TV1 | Ossi Runne | No broadcast | Annemi Genetz | |
| 1982 | TV1 | Erkki Toivanen | No broadcast | Solveig Herlin | |
| 1983 | TV1 | Erkki Pohjanheimo | No broadcast | Solveig Herlin | |
| 1984 | TV1 | Heikki Seppälä | No broadcast | Solveig Herlin | |
| 1985 | TV1 | Kari Lumikero | No broadcast | Annemi Genetz | |
| 1986 | TV1 | Kari Lumikero | No broadcast | Solveig Herlin | |
| 1987 | TV1 | Erkki Toivanen | No broadcast | Solveig Herlin | |
| 1988 | TV1 | Erkki Pohjanheimo | No broadcast | Solveig Herlin | |
| 1989 | TV1 | Heikki Harma | No broadcast | Solveig Herlin | |
| 1990 | TV1 | Erkki Pohjanheimo, Ossi Runne | No broadcast | Solveig Herlin | |
| 1991 | TV1 | Erkki Pohjanheimo | Johan Finne, Paul Olin, Wille Wilenius | Heidi Kokki | |
| 1992 | TV1 | Erkki Pohjanheimo, Kati Bergman | Johan Finne, Paul Olin, Wille Wilenius | Solveig Herlin | |
| 1993 | TV1 | Erkki Pohjanheimo, Kirsi-Maria Niemi | Johan Finne, Paul Olin, Wille Wilenius | Solveig Herlin | |
| 1994 | TV1 | Erkki Pohjanheimo, Kirsi-Maria Niemi | Unknown | Solveig Herlin | |
| 1995 | TV1 | Erkki Pohjanheimo, Olli Ahvenlahti | No broadcast | Did not participate | |
| 1996 | TV1 | Erkki Pohjanheimo, Sanna Kojo, Minna Pentti | No broadcast | Solveig Herlin | |
| 1997 | TV1 | Aki Sirkesalo, Olli Ahvenlahti | No broadcast | Did not participate | |
| 1998 | TV1 | Maria Guzenina, Sami Aaltonen | Unknown | Marjo Wilska | |
| 1999 | TV1 | Jani Juntunen | Unknown | Did not participate | |
| 2000 | TV1 | Jani Juntunen | No broadcast | Pia Mäkinen | |
| 2001 | Yle TV1 | Jani Juntunen, Asko Murtomäki | Unknown | Did not participate | |
| 2002 | Yle TV2 | Maria Guzenina, Asko Murtomäki | Thomas Lundin | Marion Rung | |
| 2003 | Yle TV2 | Maria Guzenina, Asko Murtomäki | Thomas Lundin | Did not participate | |
| 2004 | Yle TV2 | Markus Kajo, Asko Murtomäki | Thomas Lundin | Anna Stenlund | |
| 2005 | Yle TV2 | Jaana Pelkonen, Asko Murtomäki, Heikki Paasonen | Thomas Lundin | Jari Sillanpää | |
| 2006 | Yle TV2 | Jaana Pelkonen, Asko Murtomäki, Heikki Paasonen | Thomas Lundin | Nina Tapio | |
| 2007 | Yle TV2 | Ellen Jokikunnas, Asko Murtomäki, Heikki Paasonen | Thomas Lundin | Laura Voutilainen | |
| 2008 | Yle TV2 | Jaana Pelkonen, Asko Murtomäki, Mikko Peltola | Thomas Lundin | Mikko Leppilampi | |
| 2009 | Yle TV2 | Jaana Pelkonen, Asko Murtomäki, Mikko Peltola | Tobias Larsson | Jari Sillanpää | |
| 2010 | Yle TV2 | Jaana Pelkonen, Asko Murtomäki | Tobias Larsson | Johanna Pirttilahti | |
| 2011 | Yle TV2 | Tarja Närhi, Asko Murtomäki | Eva Frantz, Johan Lindroos | Susan Aho | |
| 2012 | Yle TV2 | Tarja Närhi, Tobias Larsson | Eva Frantz, Johan Lindroos | Mr. Lordi | |
| 2013 | Yle TV2 | Aino Töllinen, Juuso Mäkilähde | Eva Frantz, Johan Lindroos | Kristiina Wheeler | |
| 2014 | Yle TV2 | Sanna Pirkkalainen, Jorma Hietamäki | Eva Frantz, Johan Lindroos | Redrama | |
| 2015 | Yle TV2 | Aino Töllinen, Cristal Snow | Eva Frantz, Johan Lindroos | Krista Siegfrids | |
| 2016 | Yle TV2 | Mikko Silvennoinen | Eva Frantz, Johan Lindroos | Jussi-Pekka Rantanen | |
| 2017 | Yle TV2 | Mikko Silvennoinen | Eva Frantz, Johan Lindroos | Jenni Vartiainen | |
| 2018 | Yle TV2 | Mikko Silvennoinen | Eva Frantz, Johan Lindroos | Anna Abreu | |
| 2019 | Yle TV2 | Mikko Silvennoinen, Krista Siegfrids | Eva Frantz, Johan Lindroos | Christoffer Strandberg | |
| 2021 | Yle TV1 | Mikko Silvennoinen | Eva Frantz, Johan Lindroos | Katri Norrlin | |
| 2022 | Yle TV1 | Mikko Silvennoinen | Eva Frantz, Johan Lindroos | Aksel Kankaanranta | |
| 2023 | Yle TV1 | Mikko Silvennoinen | Eva Frantz, Johan Lindroos | Bess | |
| 2024 | Yle TV1 | Mikko Silvennoinen | Eva Frantz, Johan Lindroos | Toni Laaksonen (Note: Käärijä was initially appointed as the Finnish spokesperson, though he withdrew before the final and was replaced by Laaksonen.) | |
| 2025 | Yle TV1, TV Finland | Mikko Silvennoinen | Eva Frantz, Johan Lindroos | Jasmin Beloued | |
| 2026 | Yle TV1 | Mikko Silvennoinen | Eva Frantz, Johan Lindroos | Jaana Pelkonen | |

== Photo gallery ==
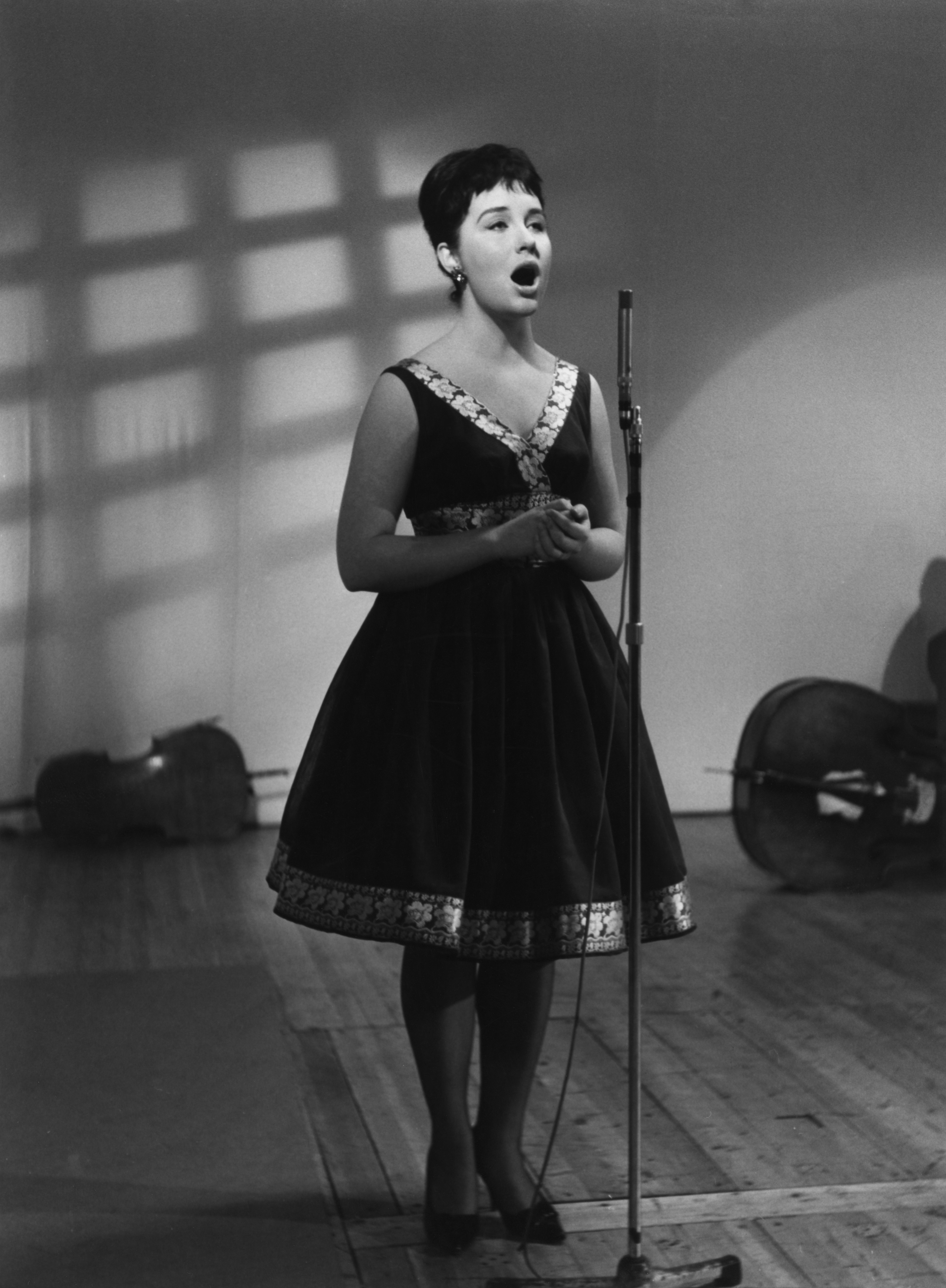
Laila Kinnunen in Cannes (1961)

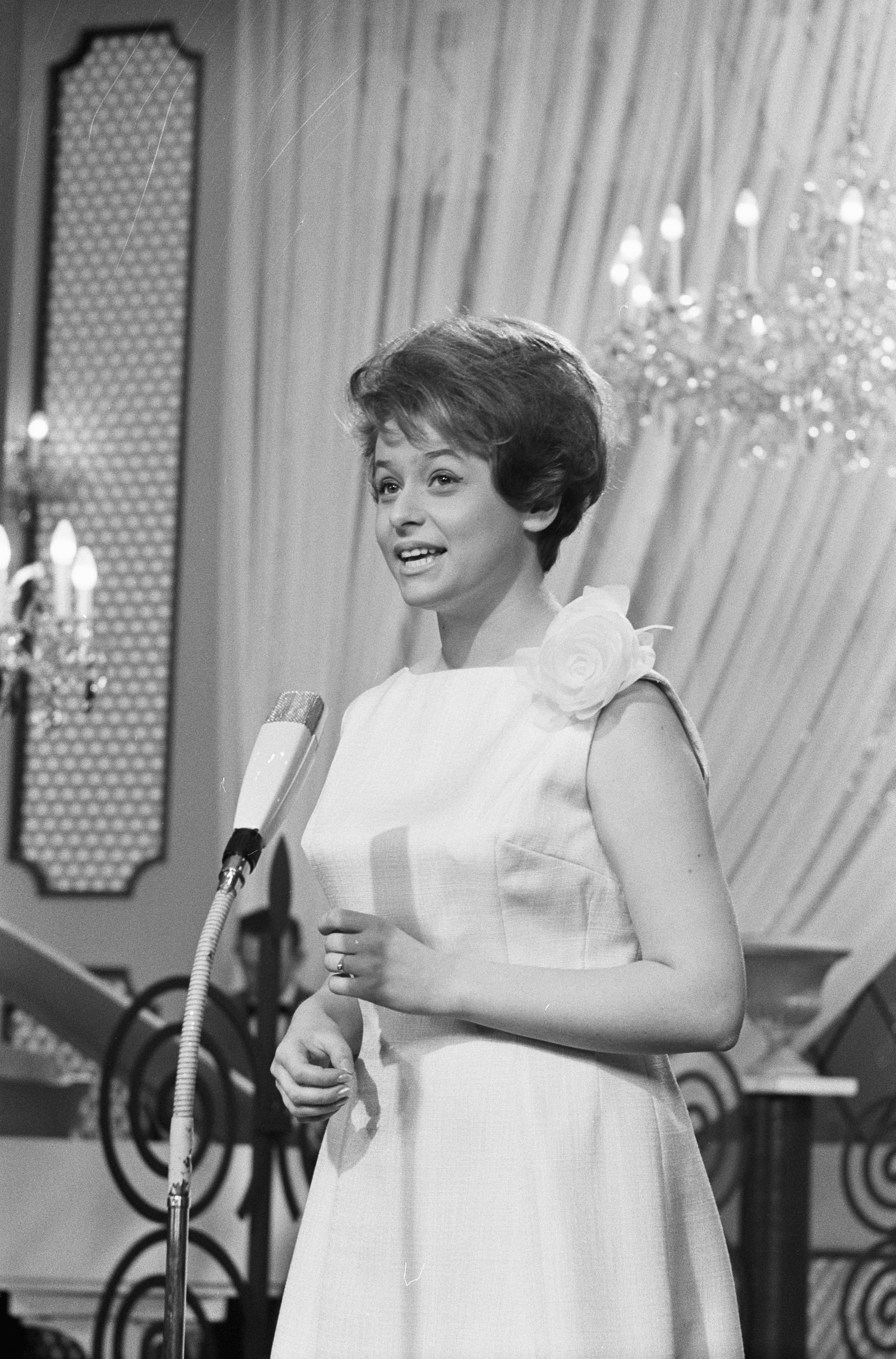
Marion Rung in Luxemburg (1962)

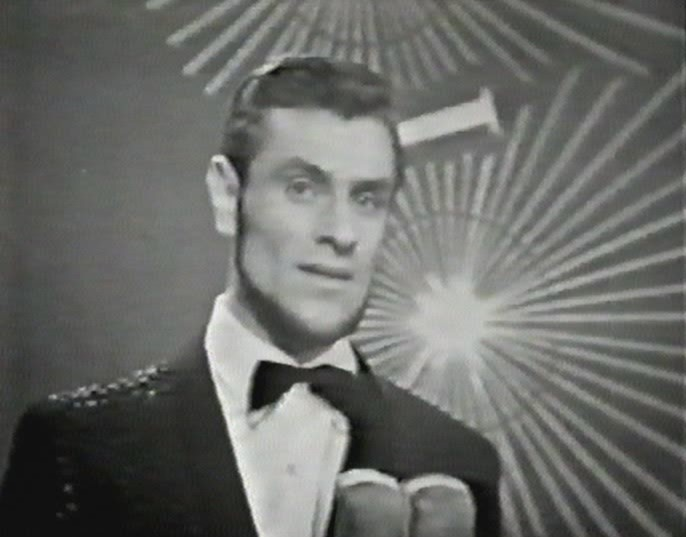
Viktor Klimenko in Naples (1965)

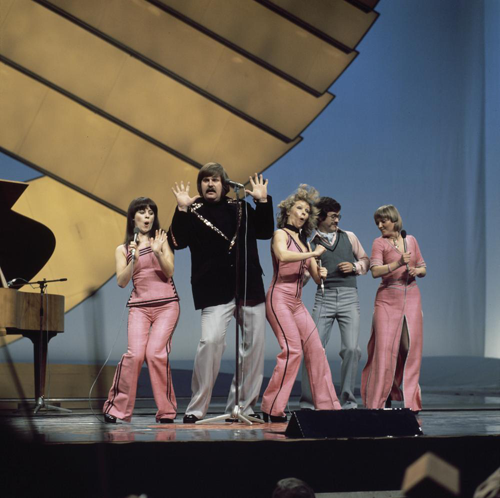
Fredi in The Hague (1976)

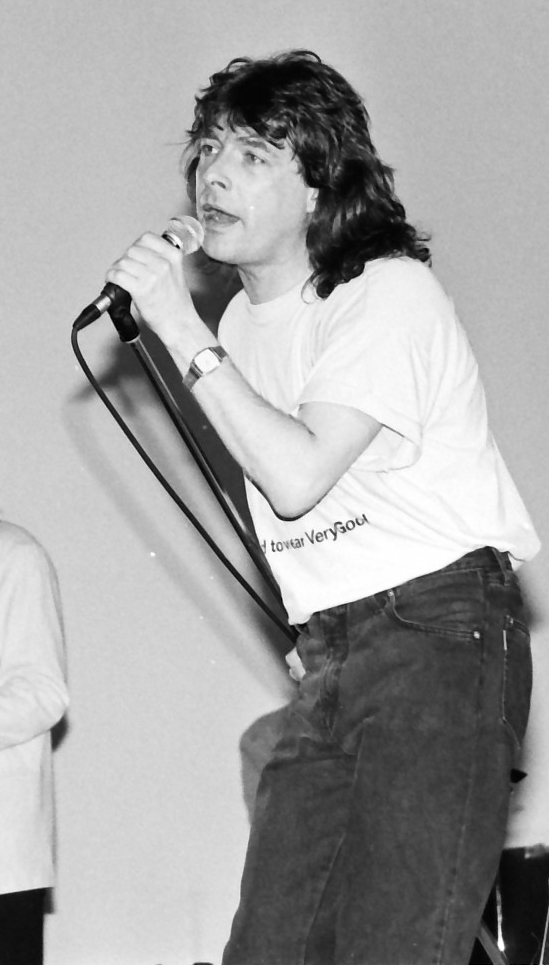
Kirka (pictured in 1989)

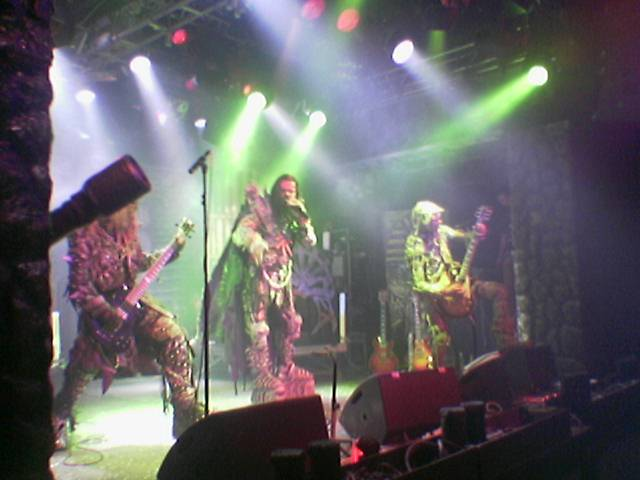
Lordi (pictured in 2005)

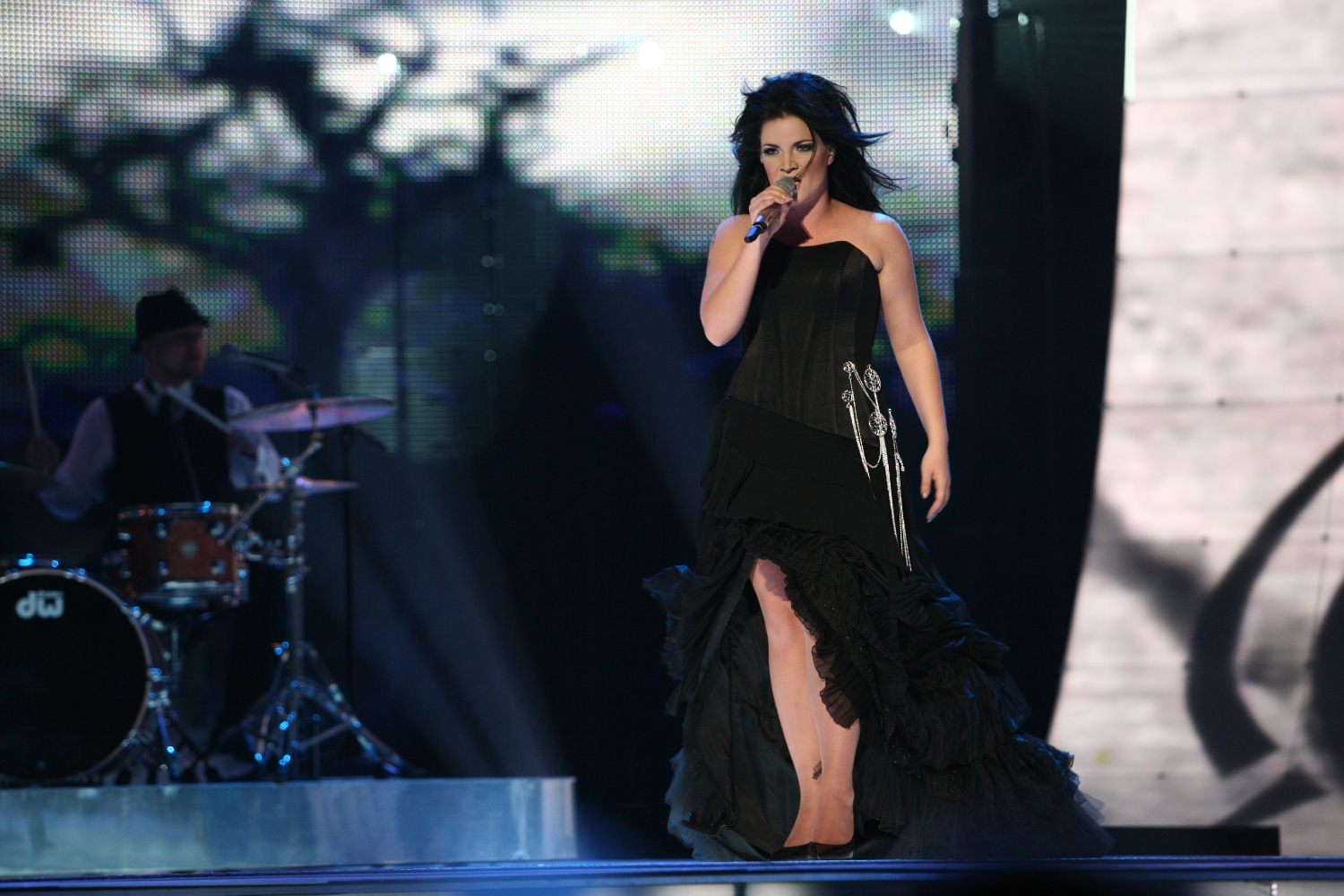
Hanna Pakarinen in Helsinki (2007)

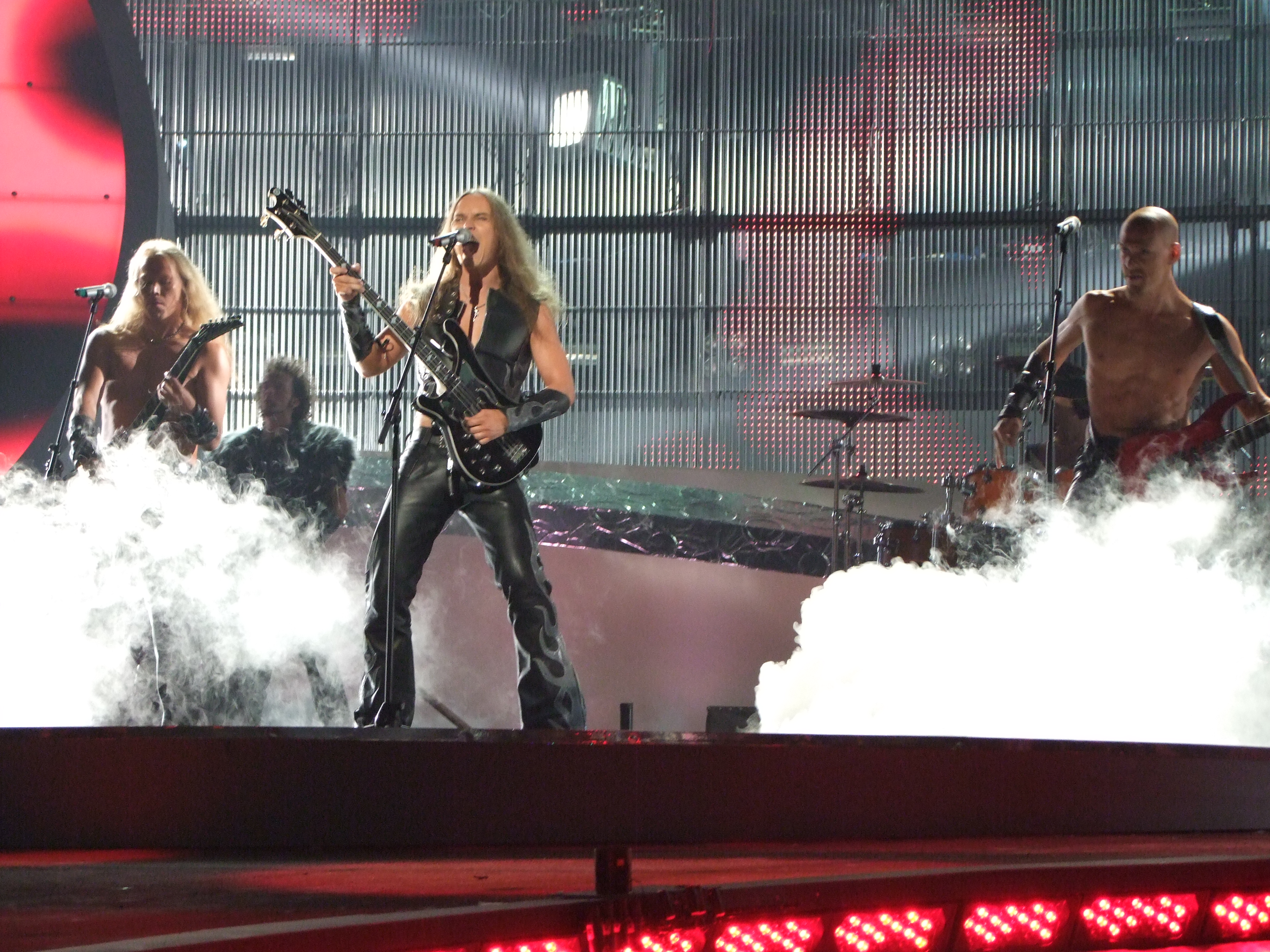
Teräsbetoni in Belgrade (2008)

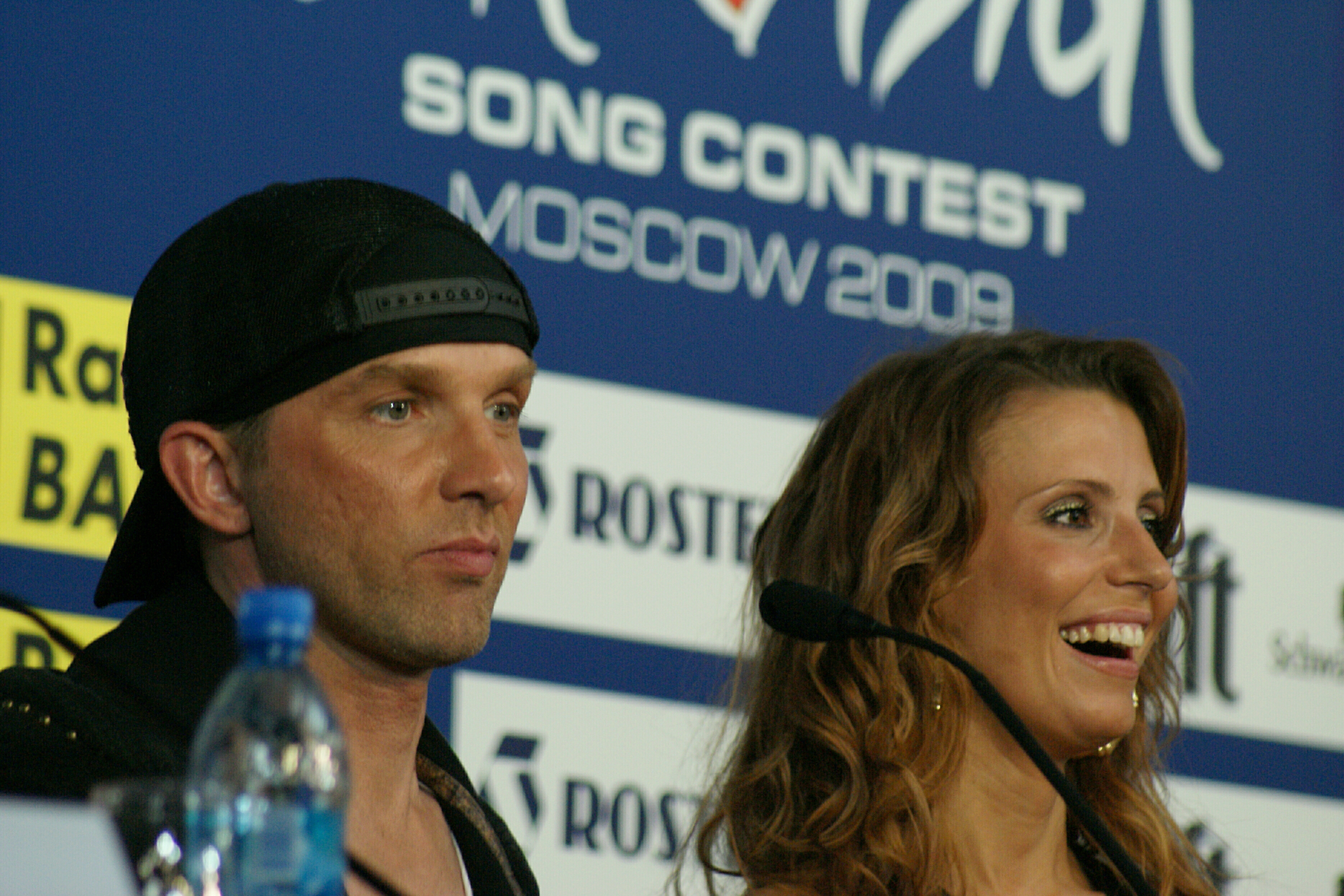
Waldo's People in Moscow (2009)

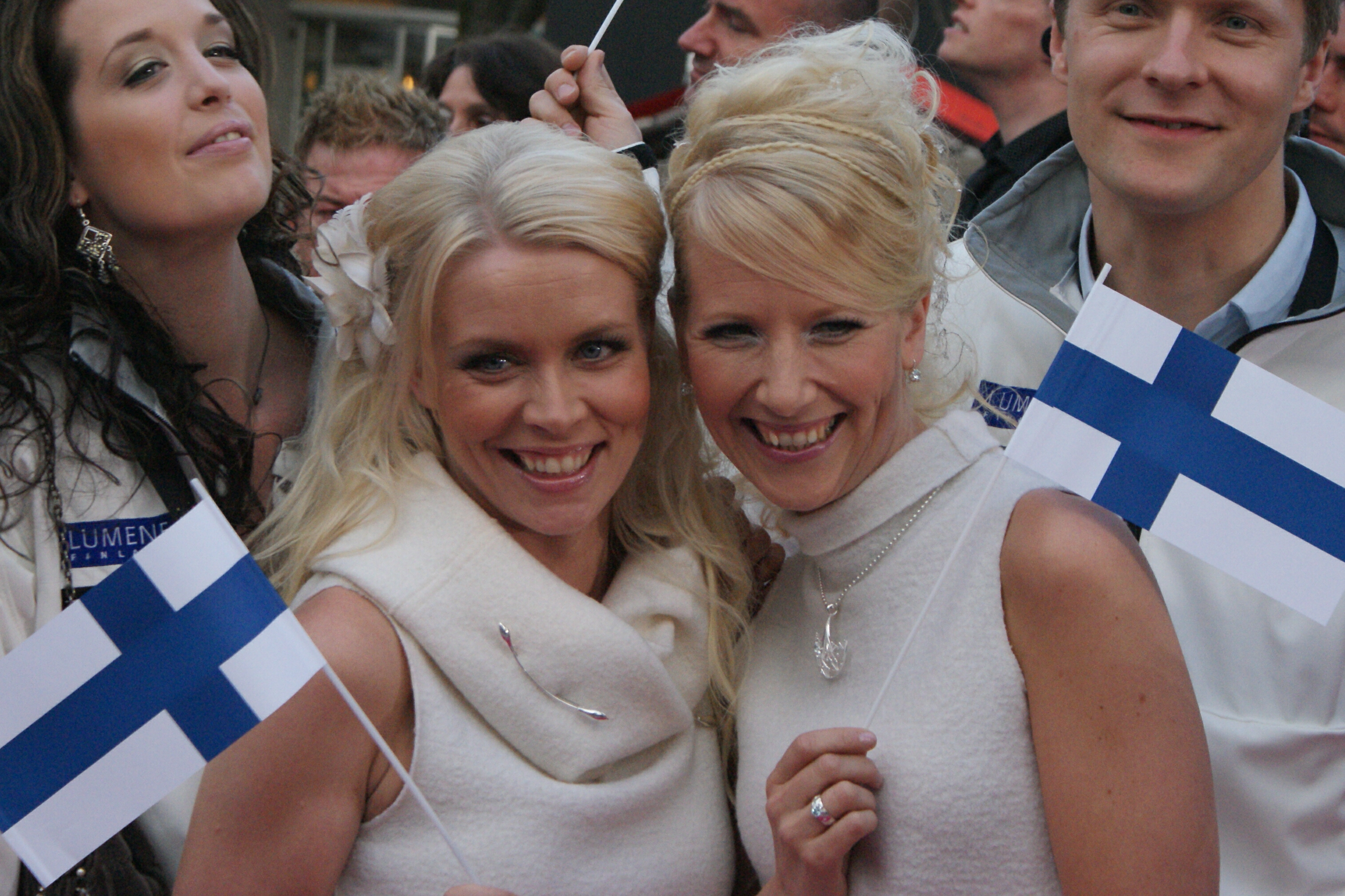
Kuunkuiskaajat in Oslo (2010)

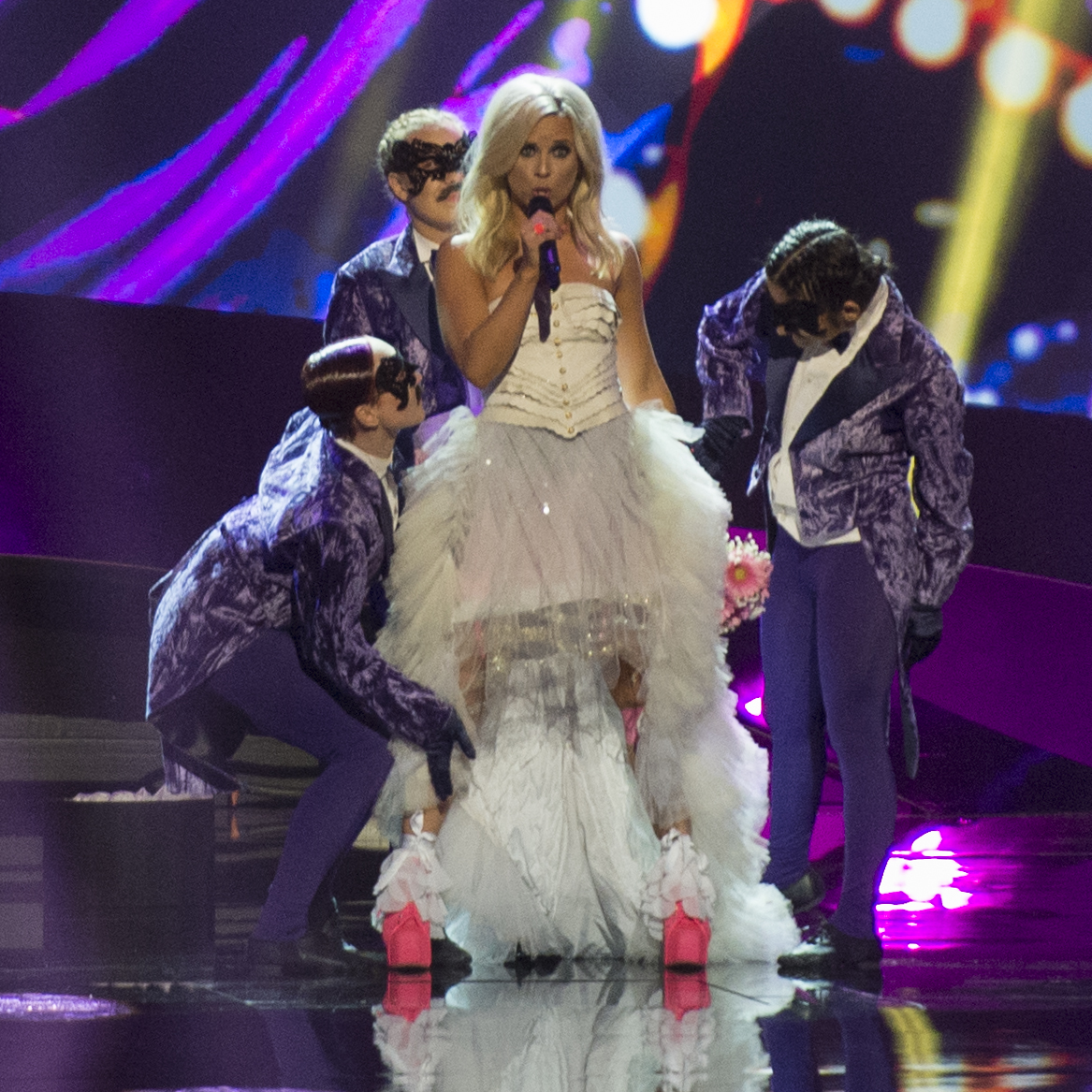
Krista Siegfrids in Malmö (2013)

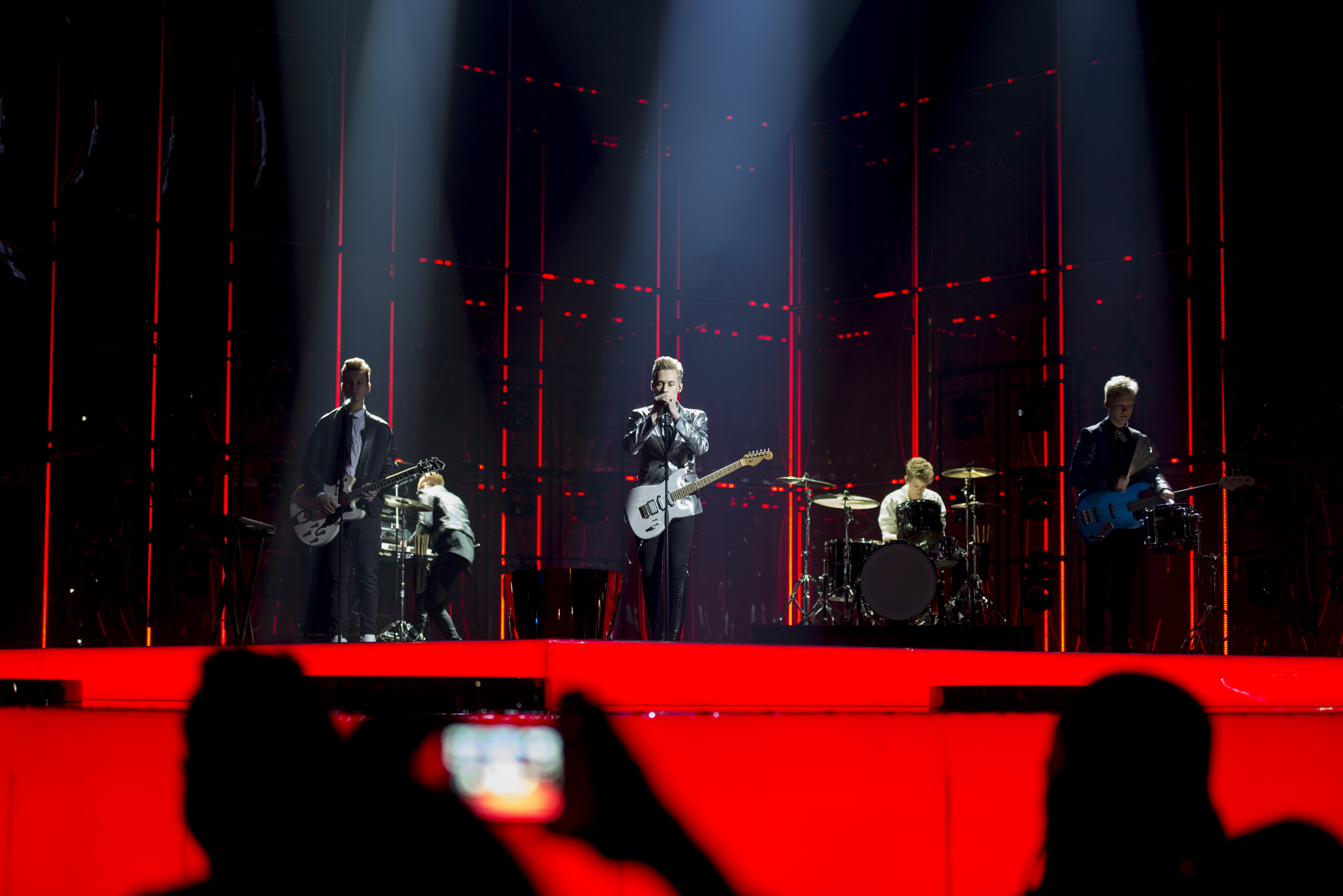
Softengine in Copenhagen (2014)

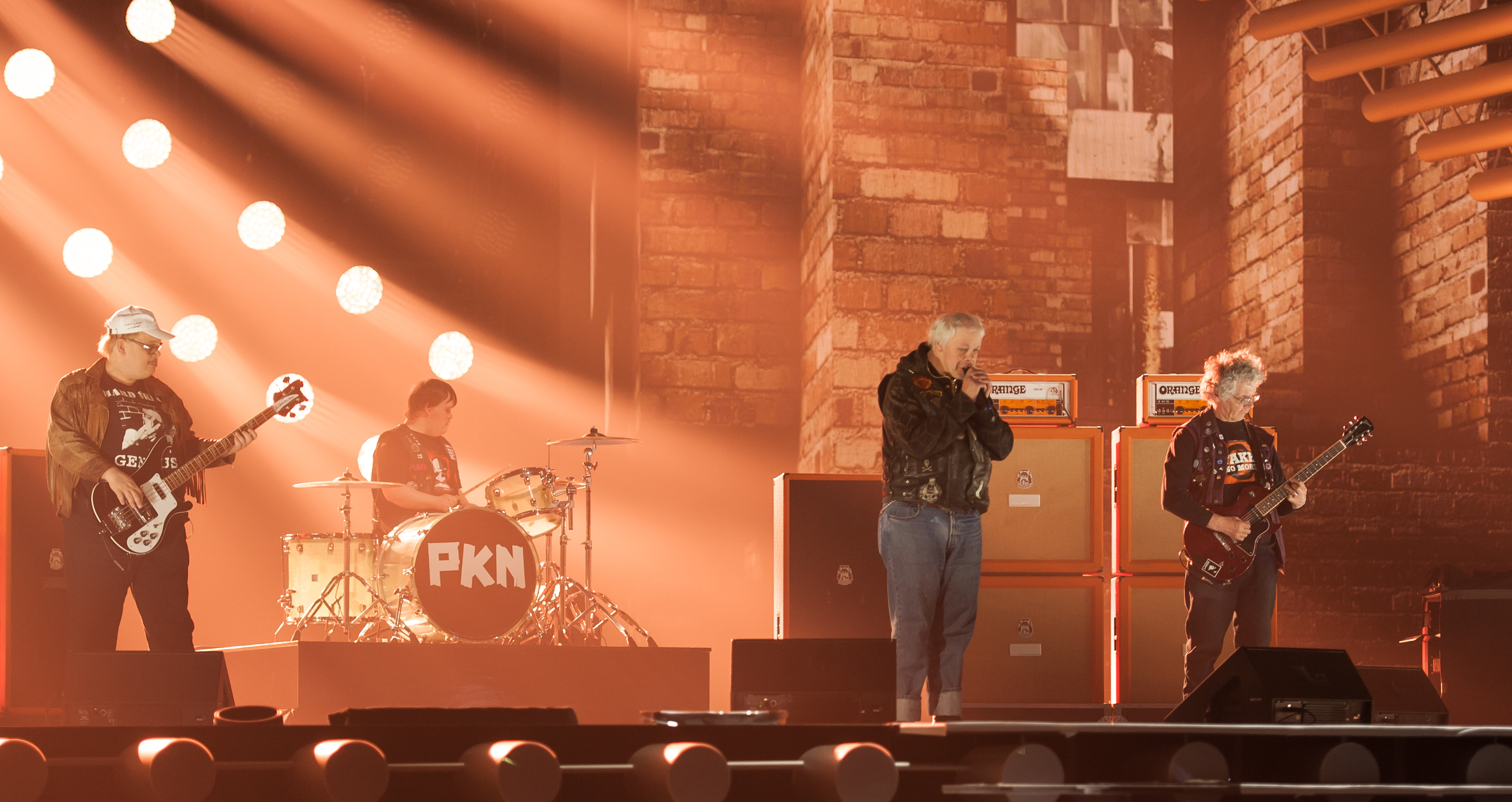
Pertti Kurikan Nimipäivät in Vienna (2015)

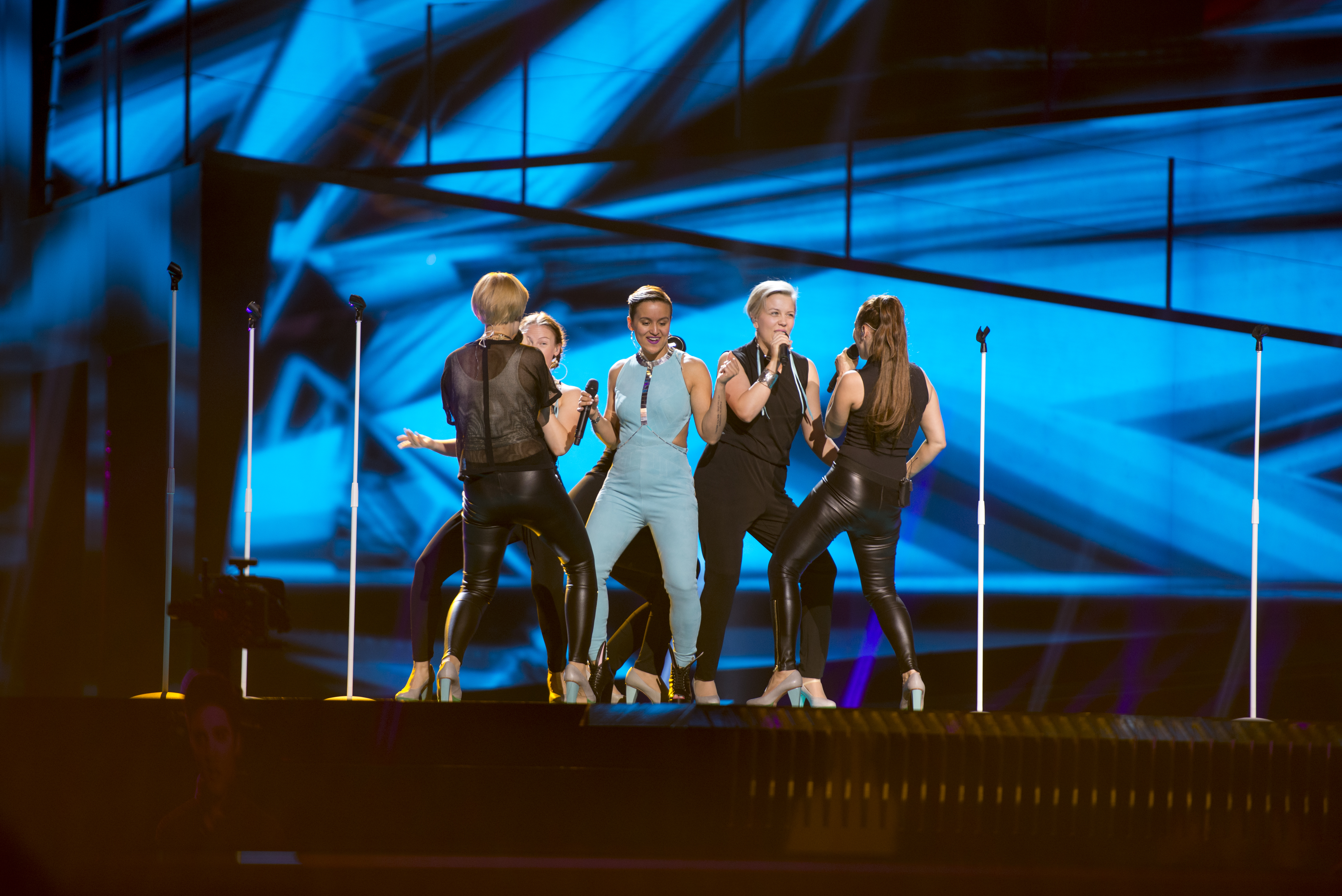
Sandhja in Stockholm (2016)

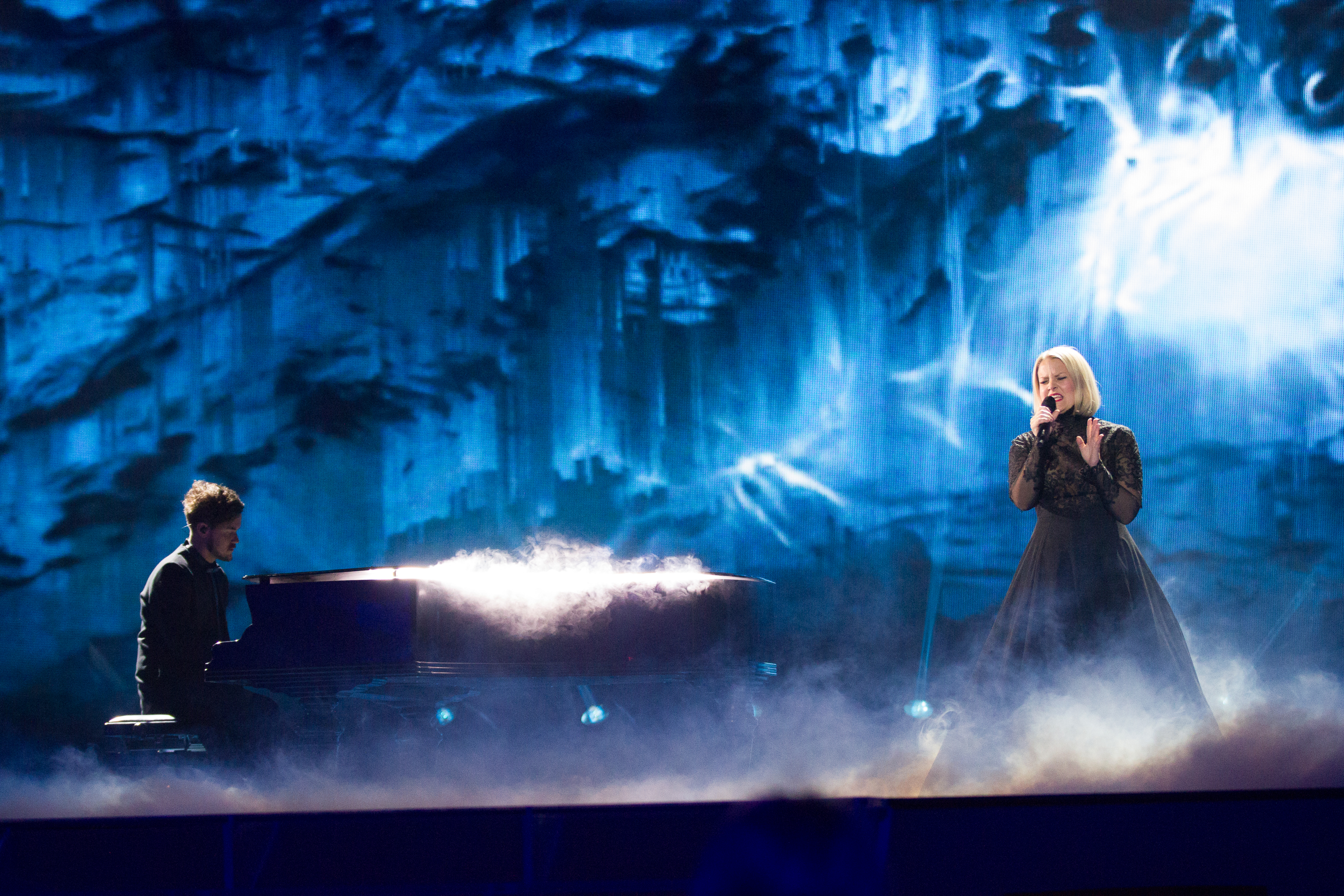
Norma John in Kyiv (2017)

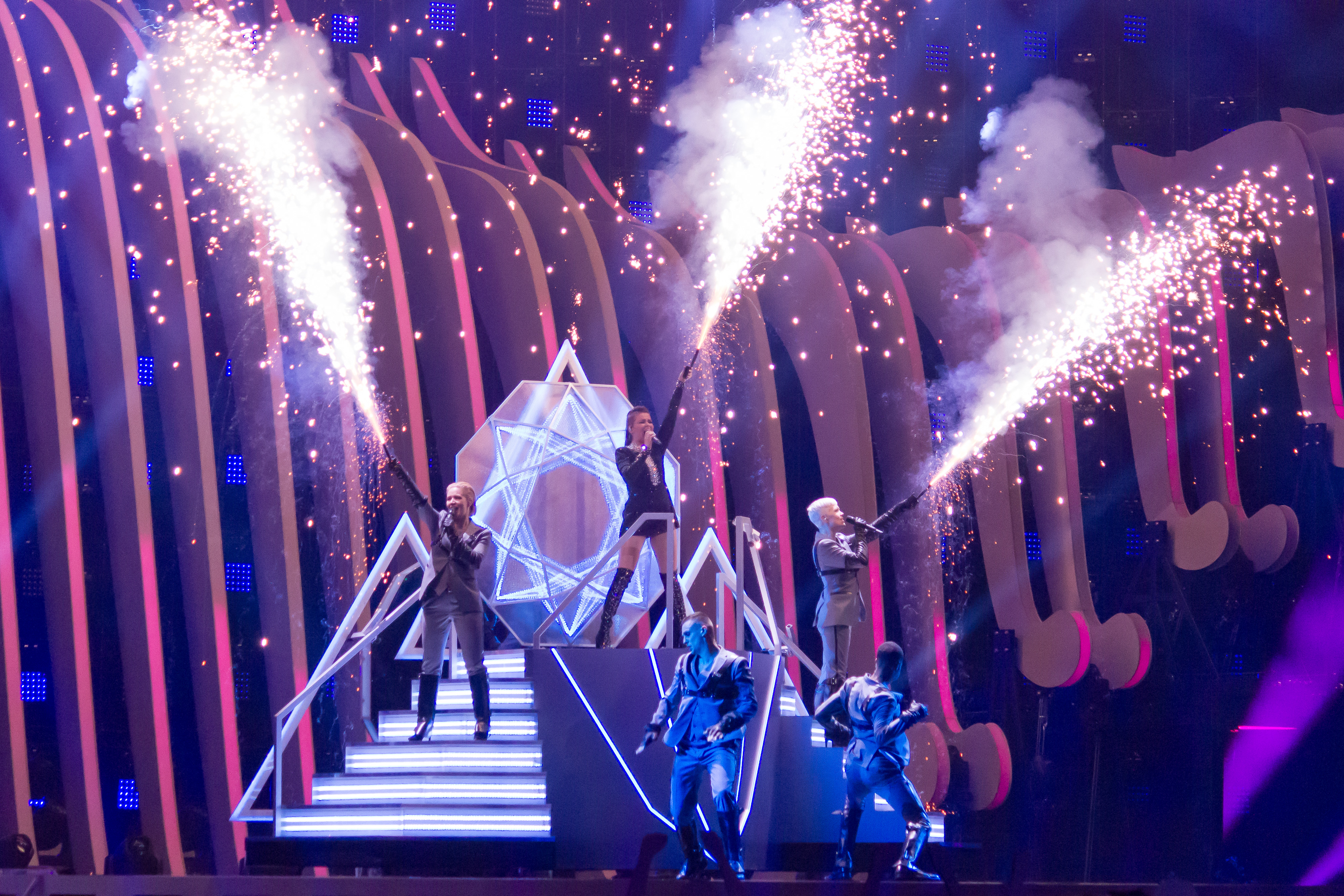
Saara Aalto in Lisbon (2018)

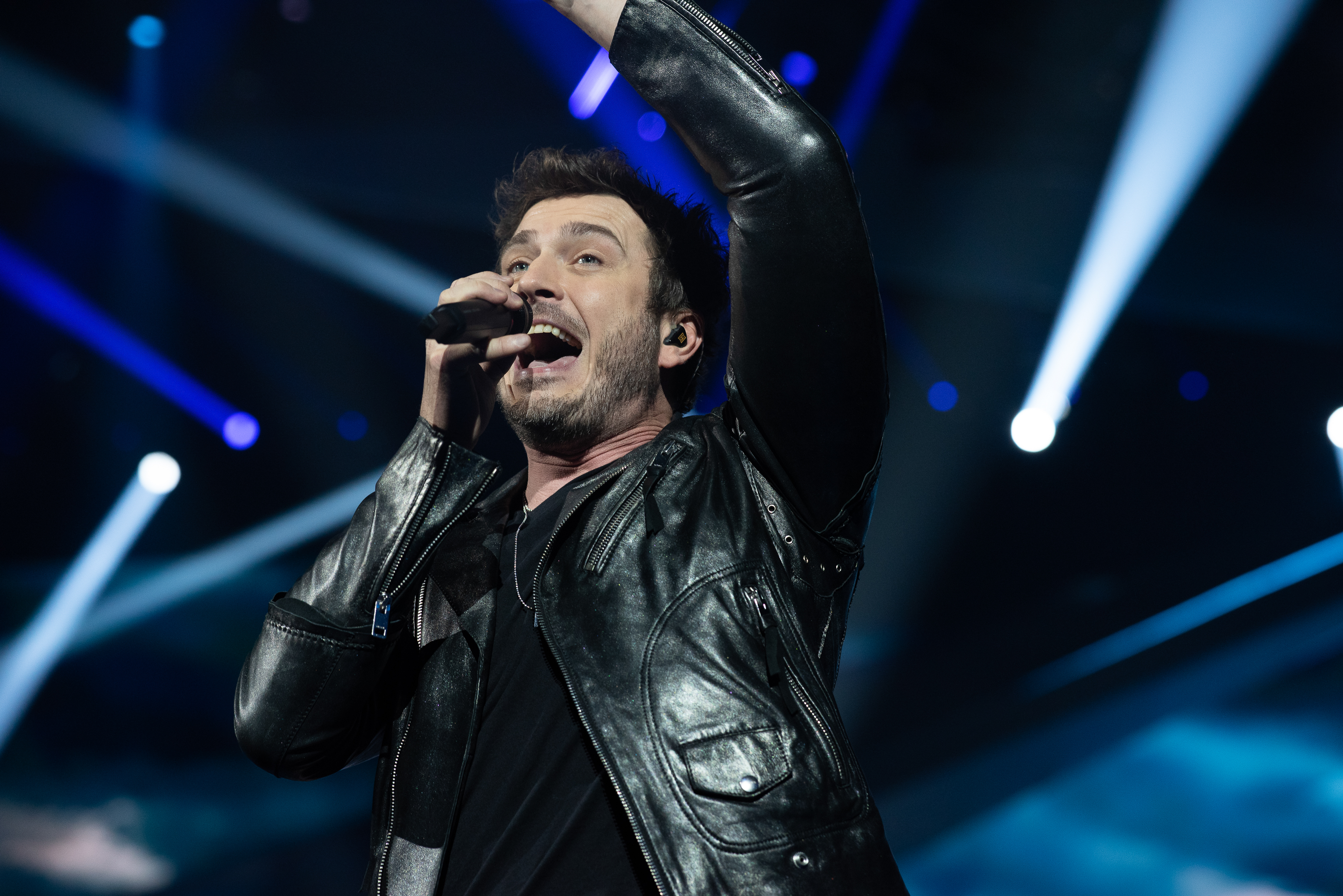
Darude (not pictured) and Sebastian Rejman in Tel Aviv (2019)

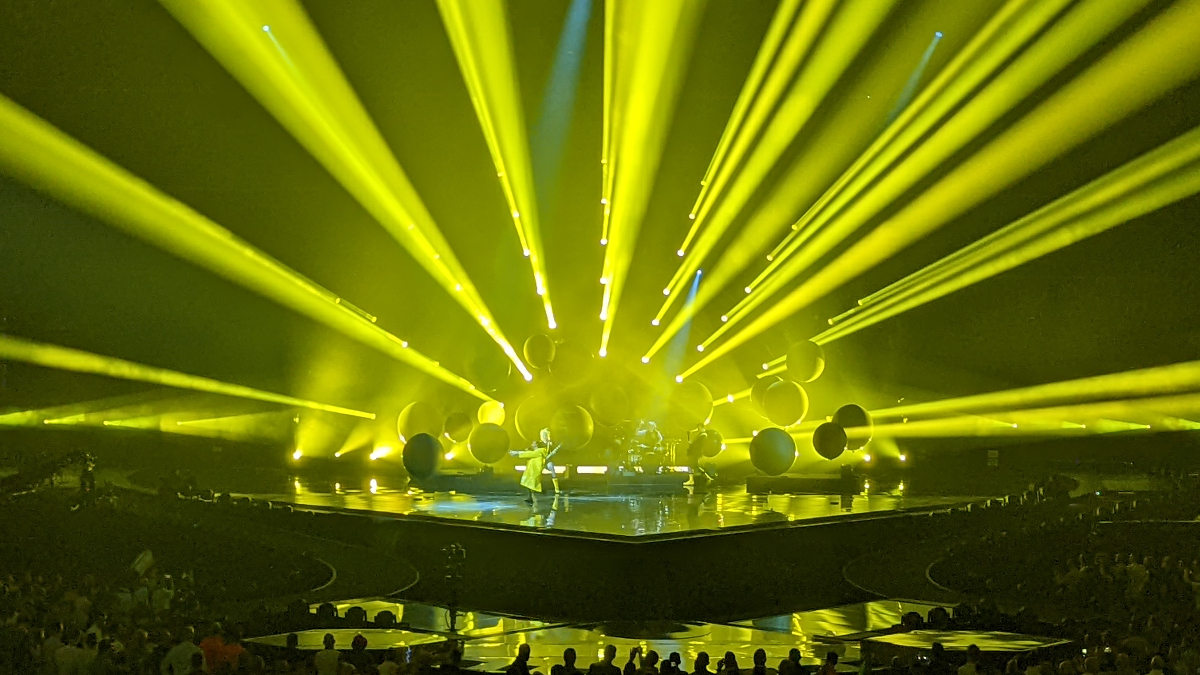
The Rasmus in Turin (2022)

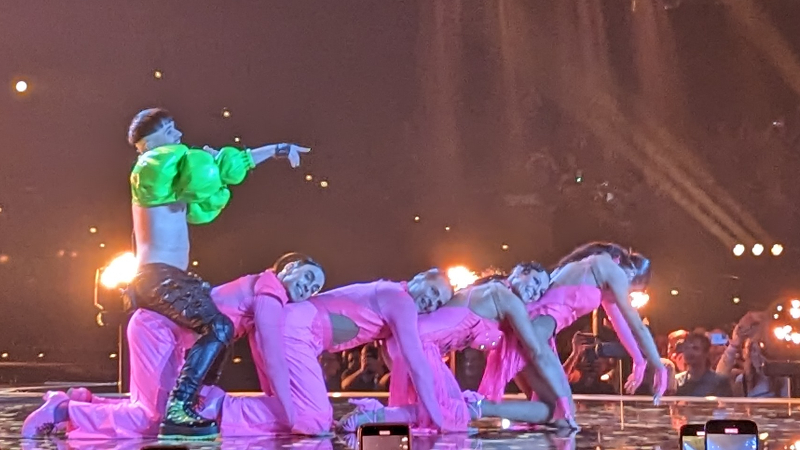
Käärijä in Liverpool (2023)

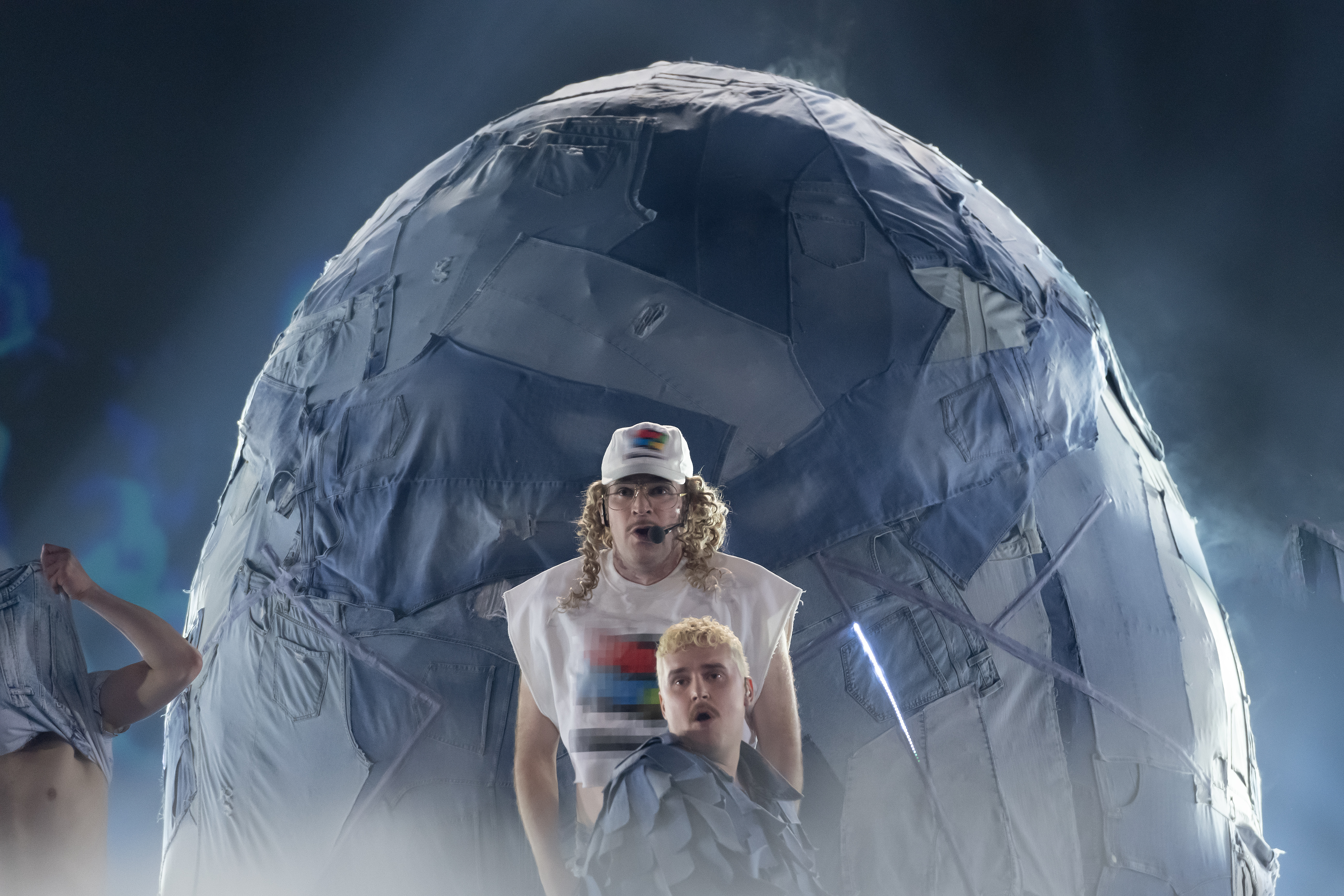
Windows95man in Malmö (2024)

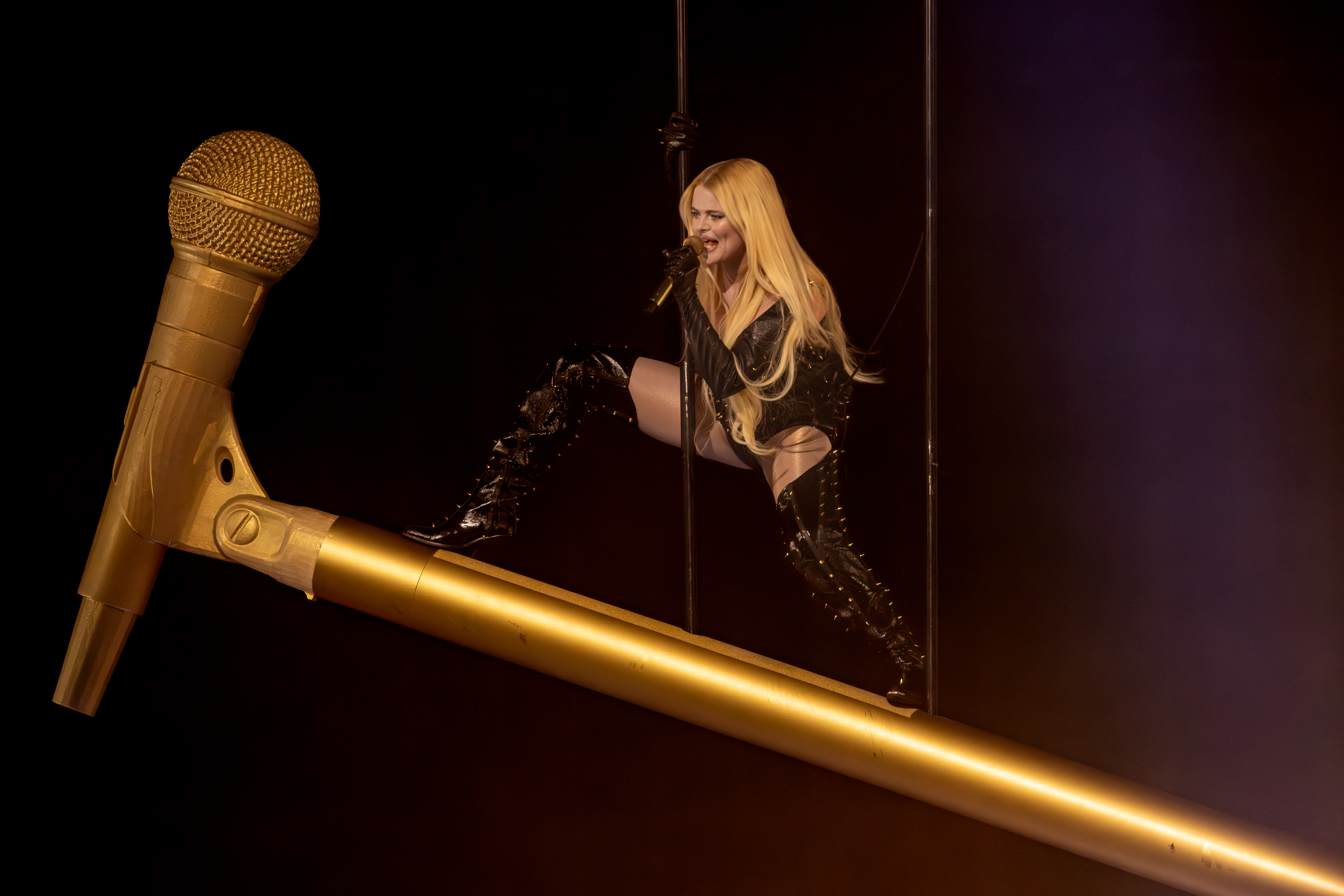
Erika Vikman in Basel (2025)

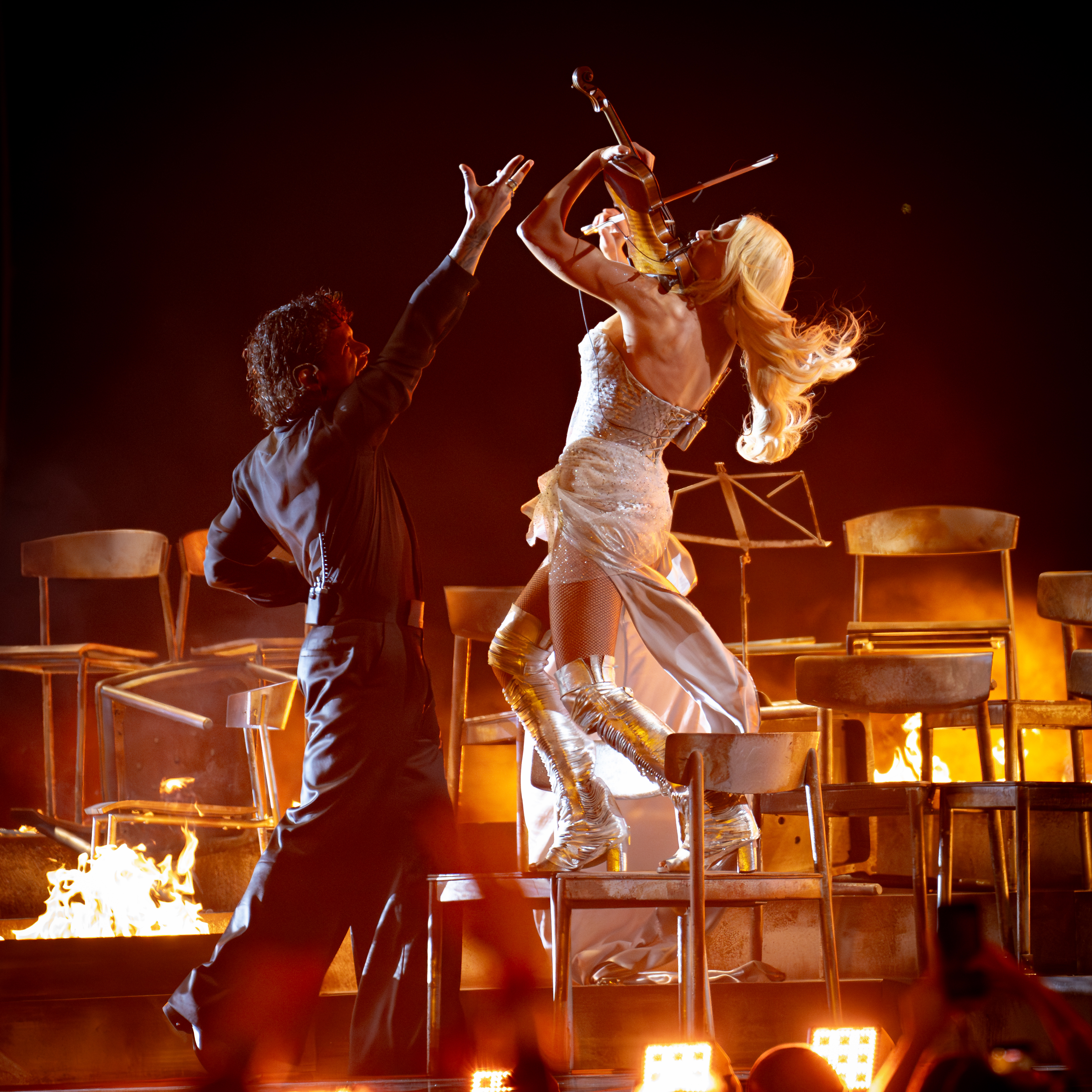
Linda Lampenius and Pete Parkkonen in Vienna (2026)
