= Finland in the Eurovision Song Contest 1964 =

- Eurovision Song Contest 1964
- Participating broadcaster: Yleisradio (Yle)
- Country: Finland
- Selection process: National final
- Selection date: 15 February 1964

Competing entry
- Song: "Laiskotellen"
- Artist: Lasse Mårtenson
- Songwriters: Lasse Mårtenson; Sauvo Puhtila

Placement
- Final result: 7th, 9 points

Participation chronology

Finland was represented at the Eurovision Song Contest 1964 with the song "Laiskotellen", composed by Lasse Mårtenson, with lyrics by Sauvo Puhtila, and performed by Mårtenson himself. The Finnish participating broadcaster, Yleisradio (Yle), selected its entry through a national final.

== Before Eurovision ==
For the first time, Yleisradio (Yle) invited ten composers for the competition. Each composer was asked to make two songs, from which Yle selected one of them. The Finnish national selection composed of a semi-final and a final.

=== Semi-final ===
The ten songs were played on radio and television test cards in late January and six finalists were chosen by postcard voting. Each voter got to name their two favourite songs. The winner of the postcard voting was "Rakkauden rikkaus" performed by Taisto Tammi.

Qualifier

Semi-final – 19–23 January 1964
R/O	Artist	Song	Songwriter(s)	Votes	Place
1	Erkki Liikanen	"Pianonsoittaja"	Erik Lindström, Börje Sundgren	3,482	9
2	Iris Rautio	"Tulen jälkeen"	Eino Hurme, Reino Helismaa	4,521	7
3	Kai Lind	"Satelliitti kahdelle"	Kaarlo Kaartinen, Sauvo Puhtila	8,281	3
4	Irmeli Mäkelä	"Kerran viel'"	Börje Sundgren	4,911	6
5	Lasse Mårtenson	"Laiskotellen"	Lasse Mårtenson, Sauvo Puhtila	5,993	4
6	Heikki Aarva	"Toisen kerran"	Erkki Rahkola, Hillevi	5,547	5
7	Vieno Kekkonen	"Tango keittiössä"	Arvo Koskimaa, Sauvo Puhtila	3,510	8
8	Stig Fransman	"Unen ihme"	Jorma Panula (Note: Lyricist unknown)	1,921	10
9	Pirkko Mannola	"Bzzz bzzz bzzz"	Kari Tuomisaari	8,755	2
10	Taisto Tammi	"Rakkauden rikkaus"	Toivo Kärki, Reino Helismaa	13,480	1

=== Final ===
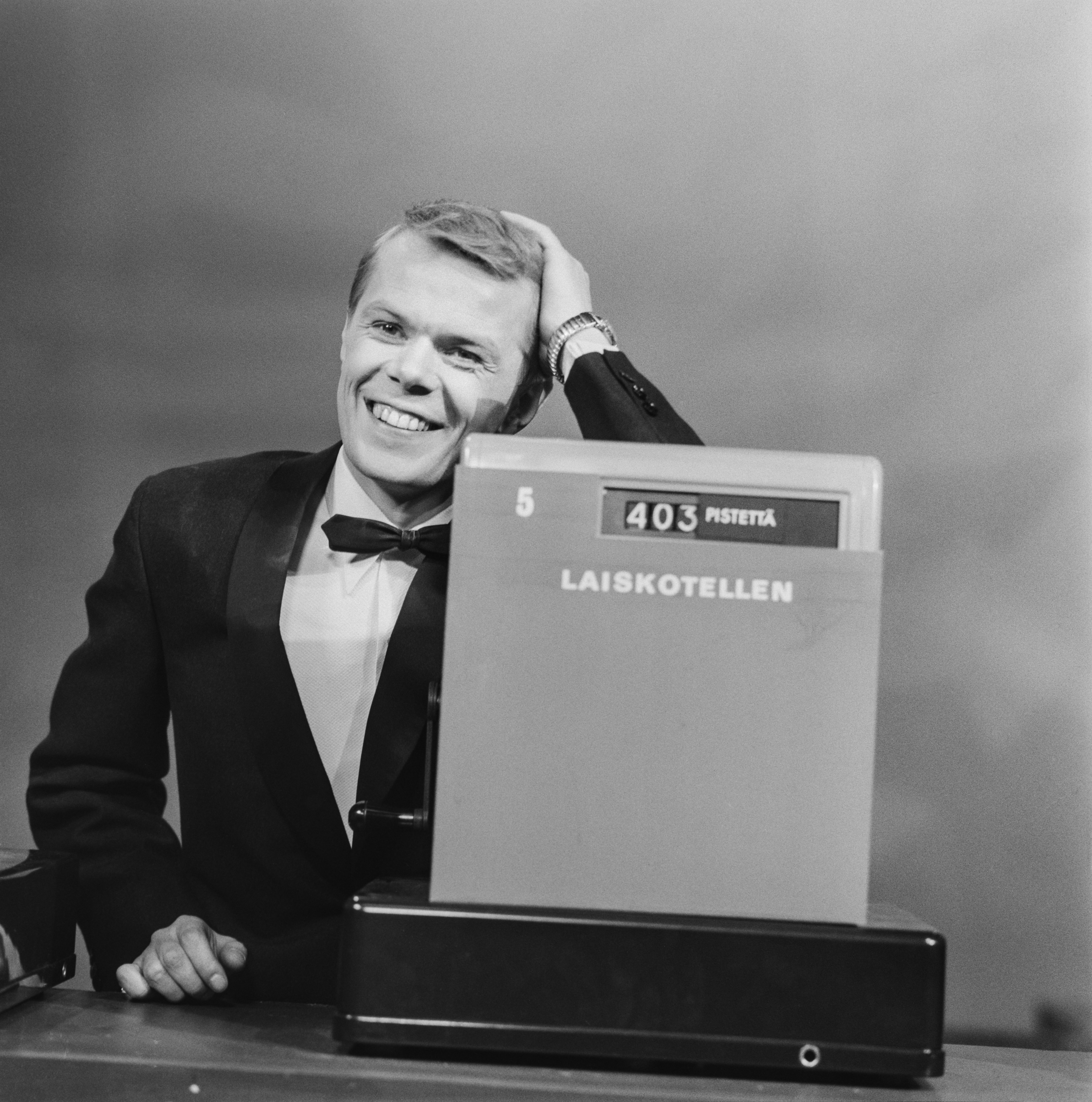
Lasse Mårtenson

The final was held on 15 February 1964 at the Yle studios in Helsinki, hosted by Börje Aura, Tuula Ignatius, Teija Sopanen and Aarno Walli. The winner was chosen by ten regional juries consisting of ten members and a Nordic jury. Should both juries have the same favourite, it would be declared the winner.

Winner

Final – 15 February 1964
R/O	Artist	Song	Points (Note: Regional jury points)	Place
1	Kai Lind	"Satelliitti kahdelle"	235	2
2	Irmeli Mäkelä	"Kerran viel'"	120	3
3	Lasse Mårtenson	"Laiskotellen"	403	1
4	Heikki Aarva	"Toisen kerran"	13	6
5	Pirkko Mannola	"Bzzz bzzz bzzz"	108	4
6	Taisto Tammi	"Rakkauden rikkaus"	21	5

Detailed Regional Jury Votes
R/O	Song	Helsinki	Turku	Tampere	Oulu	Kuopio	Lahti	Pori	Joensuu	Jyväskylä	Vaasa	Total
1	"Satelliitti kahdelle"	16	14	30	18	28	21	32	23	21	32	235
2	"Kerran viel'"	16	30	12	8	8	6		17	16	7	120
3	"Laiskotellen"	41	42	30	35	44	36	44	48	39	44	403
4	"Toisen kerran"		3	2			7	1				13
5	"Bzzz bzzz bzzz"	14		13	24	6	19	12	1	13	6	108
6	"Rakkauden rikkaus"	3	1	3	5	4	1	1	1	1	1	21

== At Eurovision ==
On the night of the final Mårtenson performed 5th in the running order, following Denmark and preceding Austria. Only an audio recording of Mårtenson's performance is known to exist. Voting was by each national jury awarding 5-3-1 to their top three songs, and at the close "Laiskotellen" had received 9 points (3 each from Denmark, Norway and the United Kingdom), placing Finland 7th of the 16 entries. The Finnish jury awarded its 5 points to contest winners Italy.

=== Voting ===
Points awarded to Finland
Score	Country
5 points	
3 points	Denmark; Norway; United Kingdom
1 point	

Points awarded by Finland
Score	Country
5 points	Italy
3 points	United Kingdom
1 point	Norway
