= Finland in the Eurovision Song Contest 2000 =

- Eurovision Song Contest 2000
- Participating broadcaster: Yleisradio (Yle)
- Country: Finland
- Selection process: Euroviisut 2000
- Selection date: 12 February 2000

Competing entry
- Song: "A Little Bit"
- Artist: Nina Åström
- Songwriters: Luca Genta; Gerrit aan 't Goor

Placement
- Final result: 18th, 18 points

Participation chronology

Finland was represented at the Eurovision Song Contest 2000 with the song "A Little Bit", composed by Luca Genta, with lyrics by Gerrit aan't Goor, and performed by Nina Åström. The Finnish participating broadcaster, Yleisradio (Yle), organised the national final Euroviisut 2000. The broadcaster returned to the contest after a one-year absence following its relegation from 1999 as one of the six entrants with the least average points over the preceding five contests. 12 entries were selected to compete in the national final, which consisted of a semi-final and a final, taking place in January and February 2000. The top six from the semi-final, as selected solely by a public vote, advanced to the final. Six entries competed in the final on 12 January where the 50/50 combination of votes from a ten-member expert jury and votes from the public selected "A Little Bit" performed by Nina Åström as the winner.

Finland competed in the Eurovision Song Contest which took place on 13 May 2000. Performing during the show in position 20, Finland placed eighteenth out of the 24 participating countries, scoring 18 points.

== Background ==
Prior to the 2000 contest, Yleisradio (Yle) had participated in the Eurovision Song Contest representing Finland thirty-five times since its first entry in 1961. Its best result in the contest achieved in 1973 where the song "Tom Tom Tom" performed by Marion Rung placed sixth.

As part of its duties as participating broadcaster, Yle organises the selection of its entry in the Eurovision Song Contest and broadcasts the event in the country. The broadcaster has been selected its entries through national final competitions that have varied in format over the years. Since 1961, a selection show that was often titled Euroviisukarsinta highlighted that the purpose of the program was to select a song for Eurovision. The broadcaster selected its entry for the 2000 contest again through the Euroviisut selection show.

== Before Eurovision ==
=== Euroviisut 2000 ===
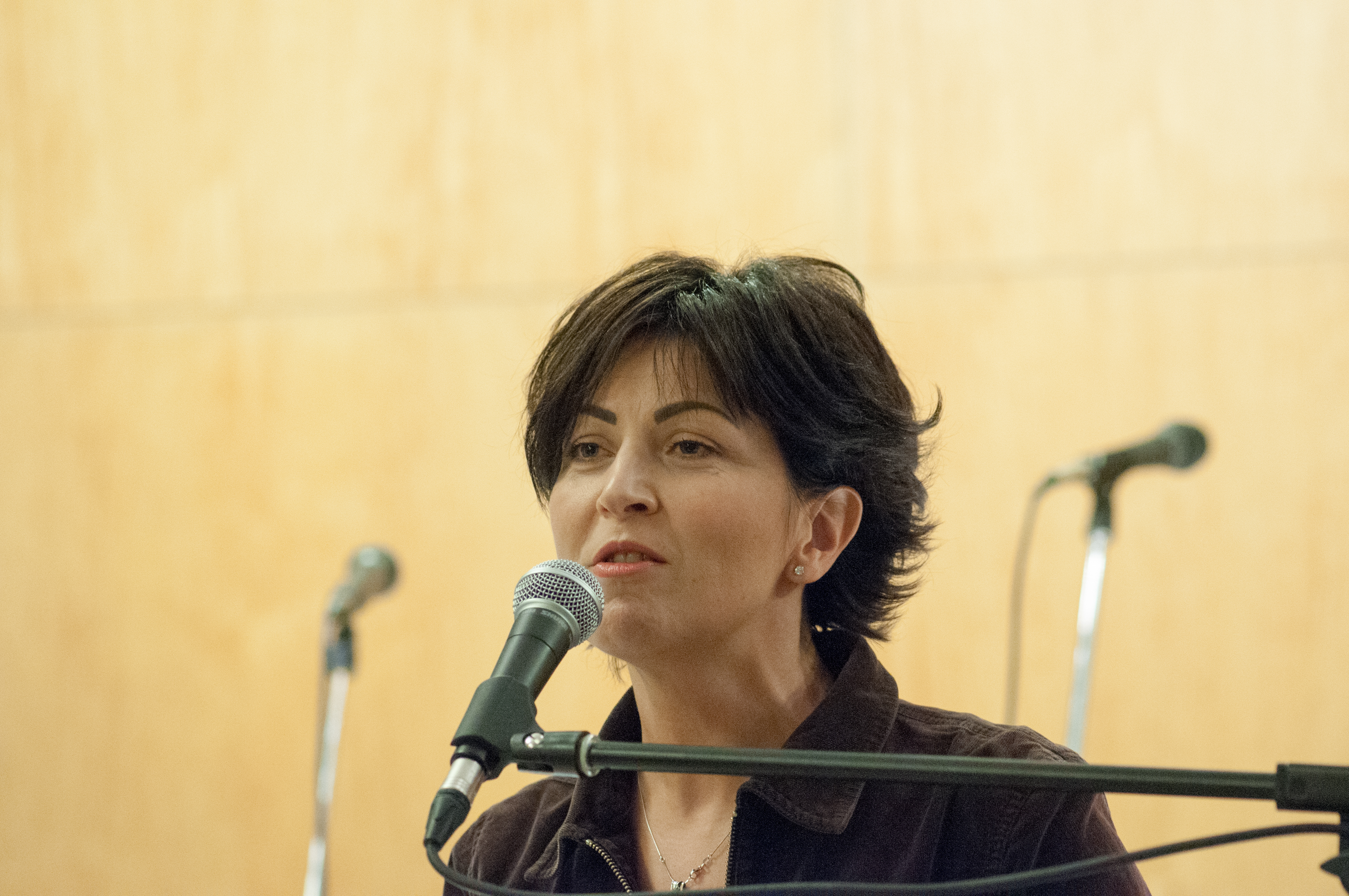
Nina Åström was selected to represent Finland in the Eurovision Song Contest 2000 following her victory at Euroviisut 2000

Euroviisut 2000 was the national final organised by Yle to select its entry for the Eurovision Song Contest 2000. Twelve entries were selected for the competition by a panel of experts appointed by Yle from 211 submissions received during a submission period and from composers directly invited by the broadcaster. The competition consisted of two stages that commenced with a radio semi-final in January 2000 where twelve songs competed and the top six entries, determined exclusively by a public vote, qualified to the final which was broadcast on Yle TV1 on 12 February 2000 during which the results were determined by public voting and jury voting. Public voting included the options of telephone and postcard voting. Prior to the final, the public was able to vote a week in advance. The winner of the competition also received a monetary prize of 10,000 Finnish markka.

==== Semi-final ====
The twelve competing entries in the semi-final were presented on Yle Radio Suomi between 2 and 9 January 2000. The top six from the twelve entries qualified to the final based on the results from the public vote held between 2 and 11 January 2000 and announced on 15 January 2000 during the Yle TV1 programme Hotelli Sointu. 8,062 votes were cast in the semi-final.

Semi-final – 2–15 January 2000
R/O	Artist	Song	Songwriter(s)	Televote	Place
1	Heidi Kyrö	"Taivas aukeaa"	Ville Pusa	486	8
2	In Tha Mix	"From the Heart"	Charles Salter, Hannu Korkeamäki	485	9
3	Sanna Kurki-Suonio	"Laulaja"	Asser Korhonen, Sanna Kurki-Suonio	197	12
4	Sisterhood	"Ordinary Life"	Jukka Hillberg, Jouni Hillberg, Markku Nikkilä	970	3
5	Micke Grahn	"You Can't Have Everything (But You Got Me)"	Aki Sirkesalo	522	7
6	Nightwish	"Sleepwalker"	Tuomas Holopainen	1,217	1
7	Anna Eriksson	"Oot voimani mun"	Petri Laaksonen, Turkka Mali	700	5
8	Arcadio	"Rauhan saan"	Edu Kettunen, Rick Kelly, Anthony Little	473	10
9	The Reseptors	"Flower Child"	Mirka Lindström, Liksa Liikala, Tina Harris	977	2
10	Nylon Beat	"Viha ja rakkaus"	Risto Asikainen, Sipi Castrén	915	4
11	Nina Åström	"A Little Bit"	Luca Genta, Gerrit aan't Goor	672	6
12	Ultra Bra	"Kaikki on hetken tässä"	Anni Sinnemäki, Kerkko Koskinen	448	11

==== Final ====
The final took place on 12 February 2000 at the Lord Hotel in Helsinki, hosted by Finnish presenters Jani Juntunen and Silvia Modig. The six entries that qualified from the preceding semi-final competed and "A Little Bit" performed by Nina Åström was selected as the winner by a 50/50 combination of public votes and a ten-member jury consisting of Jukka Virtanen, Aija Puurtinen, Erkki Pohjanheimo, Marco Bjurström, Katja Ståhl, Matti Puurtinen, Kati Bergman, Pekka Hiltunen, Marika Krook and Sami Aaltonen. The viewers and the juries each had a total of 210 points to award. Each juror distributed their points as follows: 1, 2, 3, 4, 5 and 6 points, while the viewer vote distributed their points as follows: 10, 20, 30, 40, 50 and 60 points. 40,275 votes were cast in the final.

In addition to the performances of the competing entries, the interval act featured Anneli Saaristo performing her 1989 entry "La dolce vita".

Final – 12 February 2000
R/O	Artist	Song	Jury	Televote		Total	Place
R/O	Artist	Song	Jury	Votes	Points	Total	Place
1	Anna Eriksson	"Oot voimani mun"	47	6,288	40	87	2
2	The Reseptors	"Flower Child"	15	679	10	25	6
3	Sisterhood	"Ordinary Life"	40	5,423	30	70	4
4	Nightwish	"Sleepwalker"	18	15,453	60	78	3
5	Nylon Beat	"Viha ja rakkaus"	49	4,666	20	69	5
6	Nina Åström	"A Little Bit"	41	7,766	50	91	1

Detailed Jury Votes
R/O	Song	Jukka Virtanen	Aija Puurtinen	Erkki Pohjanheimo	Marco Bjurström	Katja Ståhl	Matti Puurtinen	Kati Bergman	Pekka Hiltunen	Marika Krook	Sami Aaltonen	Total
1	"Oot voimani mun"	5	4	6	6	5	5	4	4	5	3	47
2	"Flower Child"	1	3	2	1	1	1	2	1	2	1	15
3	"Ordinary Life"	3	2	5	4	3	3	3	5	6	6	40
4	"Sleepwalker"	2	1	1	2	2	2	1	2	1	4	18
5	"Viha ja rakkaus"	6	6	3	5	6	4	5	6	3	5	49
6	"A Little Bit"	4	5	4	3	4	6	6	3	4	2	41

==== Ratings ====
Viewing figures by show
Show	Air date	Viewers	Ref.
Final	12 February 2000	870,000	

== At Eurovision ==
According to Eurovision rules, the 24-country participant list for the contest was composed of: the previous year's winning country and host nation Sweden, "Big Four" countries, the thirteen countries, which had obtained the highest average points total over the preceding five contests, and any eligible countries which did not compete in the 1999 contest. A special allocation draw was held which determined the running order and Finland was set to perform in position 20, following the entry from Macedonia and before the entry from Latvia. Nina Åström was accompanied by Danielle Ewert van Es and Kaarle Mannila as backing vocalists, Ralph van Manen as a backing vocalist and a guitarist, Raakel Lignell as a violinist, and Luca Genta as a keyboardist. Finland finished in eighteenth place with 18 points.

The show was televised in Finland on YLE TV1 with commentary by Jani Juntunen. The show was also broadcast via radio with commentary by Iris Mattila and Tarja Närhi on Yle Radio Suomi.

=== Voting ===
Below is a breakdown of points awarded to Finland and awarded by Finland in the contest. The nation awarded its 12 points to Latvia in the contest.

Yle appointed Pia Mäkinen as its spokesperson to announce the Finnish votes during the final.

Points awarded to Finland
Score	Country
12 points	
10 points	
8 points	
7 points	Estonia
6 points	
5 points	Netherlands
4 points	Romania
3 points	
2 points	Sweden
1 point	

Points awarded by Finland
Score	Country
12 points	Latvia
10 points	Denmark
8 points	Estonia
7 points	Sweden
6 points	Croatia
5 points	Russia
4 points	Turkey
3 points	Austria
2 points	Germany
1 point	Ireland
