= Pohjanheimo =

Surname list

Pohjanheimo is a surname. Notable people with the surname include:

- Erkki Pohjanheimo (born 1942), Finnish television producer and director
- Hjalmar V. Pohjanheimo (1867–1936), Finnish film director
- Mervi Pohjanheimo (born 1945), Finnish producer and director
