= Finland in the Eurovision Song Contest 1994 =

- Eurovision Song Contest 1994
- Participating broadcaster: Yleisradio (Yle)
- Country: Finland
- Selection process: Euroviisut 1994
- Selection date: 5 March 1994

Competing entry
- Song: "Bye Bye Baby"
- Artist: CatCat
- Songwriters: Kari Salli; Markku Lentonen

Placement
- Final result: 22nd, 11 points

Participation chronology

Finland was represented at the Eurovision Song Contest 1994 with the song "Bye Bye Baby", written by Kari Salli and Markku Lentonen, and performed by the duo CatCat. The Finnish participating broadcaster, Yleisradio (Yle), organised the national final Euroviisut 1994 in order to select its entry for the contest. Ten entries were selected to compete in the national final on 5 March 1994 where votes from the public selected "Bye Bye Baby" performed by CatCat as the winner with 25,834 votes.

Finland competed in the Eurovision Song Contest which took place on 30 April 1994. Performing during the show in position 2, Finland placed twenty-second out of the 25 participating countries, scoring 11 points.

== Background ==
Prior to the 1994 contest, Yleisradio (Yle) had participated in the Eurovision Song Contest representing Finland thirty-two times since its first entry in 1961. Its best result in the contest achieved in 1973 where the song "Tom Tom Tom" performed by Marion Rung placed sixth.

As part of its duties as participating broadcaster, Yle organises the selection of its entry in the Eurovision Song Contest and broadcasts the event in the country. The broadcaster has been selected its entries through national final competitions that have varied in format over the years. Since 1961, a selection show that was often titled Euroviisukarsinta highlighted that the purpose of the program was to select a song for Eurovision. The broadcaster selected its entry for the 1994 contest again through the Euroviisut selection show.

== Before Eurovision ==
=== Euroviisut 1994 ===
Euroviisut 1994 was the national final that selected the Finnish entry for the Eurovision Song Contest 1994. The competition consisted of a final on 5 March 1994, held at the Tampere Hall in Tampere and hosted by Jukka Laaksonen, Juha Laitila and Joonas Myllyveräjä. Ten entries selected for the competition from 470 submissions received during a submission period as well as from composers and music publishers directly invited by Yle competed and "Bye Bye Baby" performed by CatCat was selected as the winner based on the results from a public vote, which were revealed by Finland's five telephone regions along with the votes of the venue audience. 119,322 votes were cast during the show, which was broadcast on Yle TV1 and watched by 1.17 million viewers in Finland. During the voting, it was discovered that the votes were incorrectly announced but were shortly amended following the competition.

In addition to the performances of the competing entries, the interval acts featured Plavka performing "Contagious", Jam and Spoon featuring Plavka performing "Right in the Night", and Kaija Koo performing "Kylmä ilman sua" and "Tule lähemmäs Beibi".

Final – 5 March 1994
R/O	Artist	Song	Songwriter(s)	Televote	Place
1	Tarja Lunnas	"Kuka tykkää suukoista"	Jari Holm, Seppo Matintalo, Veikko Juntunen	13,857	4
2	Dario	"Ateljee"	Darius Witkowski, Timo Puheloinen	6,567	9
3	Sari Sakki	"Jäisit mun luo"	Esa Rimpiläinen	6,809	8
4	Indiana	"Hän lähtee tänään"	Liisa Akimof	7,738	6
5	Rio	"Rakkauden tiellä"	Markku Tommila, Hannu Perälä, Timo Niemi	13,633	5
6	Janita	"Enkeli"	Tomi Ervi	14,646	3
7	CatCat	"Bye Bye Baby"	Kari Salli, Markku Lentonen	25,834	1
8	Susanne Sonntag	"En dans på livets vågor"	Kari Kuusamo, Susanne Sonntag	17,348	2
9	Tauski	"Seitsemänteen taivaaseen"	Tauski Peltonen	6,009	10
10	Marina Sigfrids	"Lyft mig upp"	Clas Holm	7,445	7

Detailed Voting Results
R/O	Song	Audience	Televoting Regions					Total
R/O	Song	Audience	Northern Finland	Eastern Finland	Central Finland	Southwestern Finland	Southern Finland	Total
1	"Kuka tykkää suukoista"	63	3,281	1,497	1,930	1,675	5,411	13,857
2	"Ateljee"	23	501	1,686	481	304	3,572	6,567
3	"Jäisit mun luo"	80	398	1,730	526	275	3,800	6,809
4	"Hän lähtee tänään"	213	522	260	1,023	538	5,182	7,738
5	"Rakkauden tiellä"	112	2,180	1,452	2,019	2,537	5,333	13,633
6	"Enkeli"	45	2,621	2,010	2,223	1,328	6,419	14,646
7	"Bye Bye Baby"	140	7,885	3,697	4,026	3,343	6,743	25,834
8	"En dans på livets vågor"	76	3,054	2,368	2,649	2,374	6,917	17,438
9	"Seitsemänteen taivaaseen"	12	583	486	670	588	3,670	6,009
10	"Lyft mig upp"	29	1,213	508	575	541	4,579	7,445

== At Eurovision ==
According to Eurovision rules, all nations with the exceptions of the bottom six countries in the 1993 contest competed in the final on 30 April 1994. Following the allocation draw which determined the running order, Finland was set to perform in position 2, following the entry from Sweden and before the entry from Ireland. CatCat was accompanied by James Black and Charles Salter as dancers. The Finnish conductor at the contest was Olli Ahvenlahti, and Finland finished in twenty-second place with 11 points.

The contest was broadcast on Yle TV1 (with commentary by Erkki Pohjanheimo and Kirsi-Maria Niemi) and on Swedish-language radio station Riksradion. Yle appointed Solveig Herlin as its spokesperson to announce the Finnish votes during the final.

=== Voting ===
Below is a breakdown of points awarded to Finland and awarded by Finland in the contest. The nation awarded its 12 points to Hungary.

Points awarded to Finland
Score	Country
12 points	
10 points	Greece
8 points	
7 points	
6 points	
5 points	
4 points	
3 points	
2 points	
1 point	Bosnia and Herzegovina

Points awarded by Finland
Score	Country
12 points	Hungary
10 points	Cyprus
8 points	Poland
7 points	Ireland
6 points	Malta
5 points	Portugal
4 points	Greece
3 points	Germany
2 points	Bosnia and Herzegovina
1 point	Iceland
