= Pauliina May =

Finnish-Dutch vocalist (born 1967)

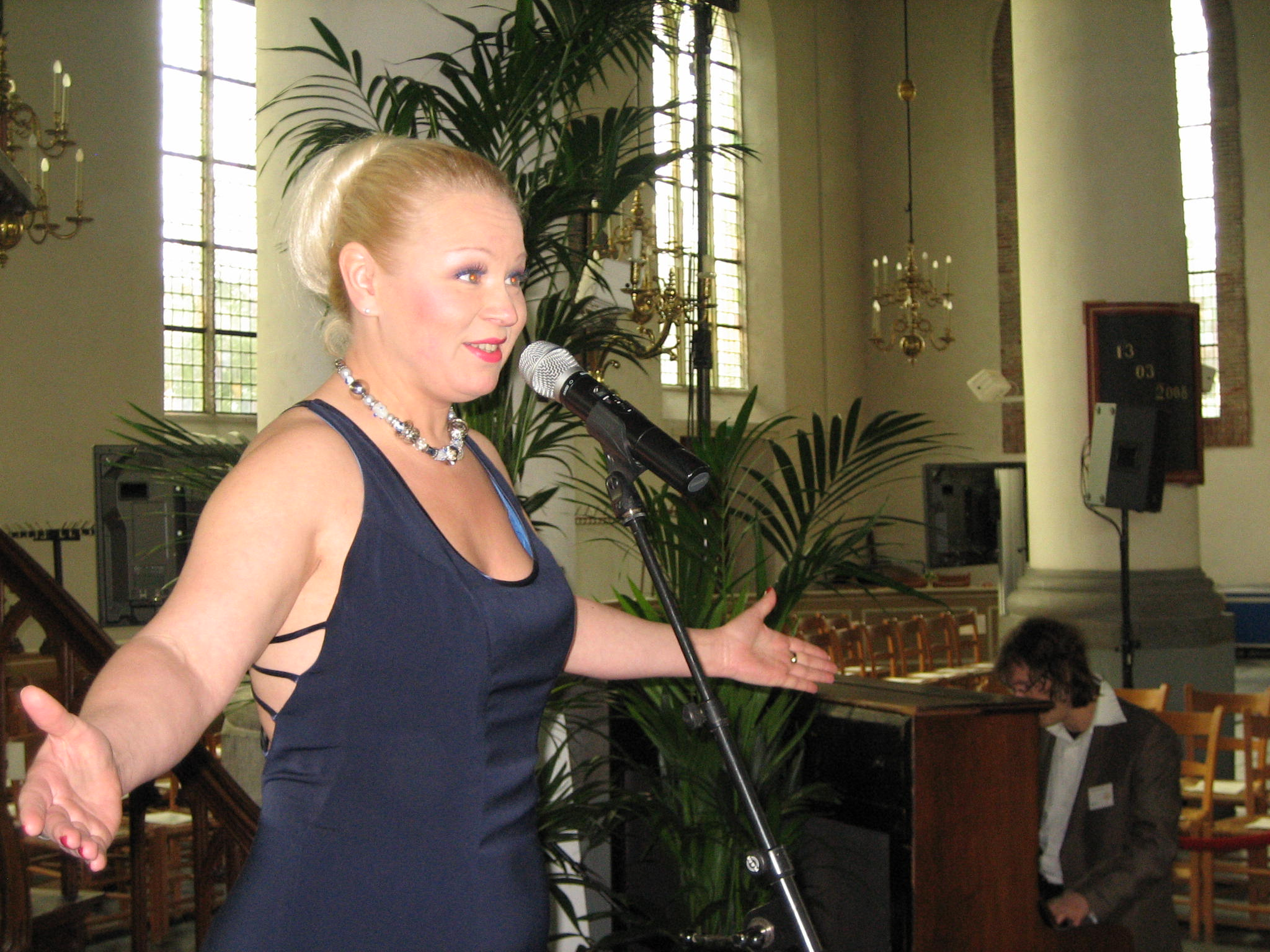
- Born: Katri Pauliina Pohjanheimo; 26 February 1967 (age 59); Helsinki, Finland
- Education: Rotterdam Conservatorium
- Occupations: Singer, Vocal teacher, Afro-Cuban and Caribbean vocals teacher
- Employer(s): Pauliina May Vocal Studio, Kinderdijk and Codarts, Rotterdam

Pauliina May (born Pauliina Pohjanheimo) (born 1967) is a Finnish–Dutch vocalist and a voice teacher. She is currently resident in Kinderdijk, The Netherlands.

== Career ==
Pauliina May studied vocals and vocal pedagogy at the Pop & Jazz Conservatory, Helsinki, Finland during the years 1991–1996. She continued her music studies specializing in Afro-Cuban and Brazilian music and Argentinean Tango at the World Music Department of the Rotterdam Conservatorium, Rotterdam, the Netherlands (1996–2000). She graduated from the Rotterdam Conservatorium as a vocal pedagogue on 11 December 2000 with a diploma 9/10. After moving to The Netherlands Pauliina uses "Pauliina May" as her artist name.

Since autumn 2017 Pauliina May has been teaching Afro-Cuban and Caribbean vocals at Codarts (former Rotterdam Conservatorium). Next to music studies Pauliina May has been dancing flamenco at the flamenco schools of Anneli Uronen in Finland 1985–1988 and Escuela de Mariquilla in Granada, Spain 1988–1989. May made a study trip to the Conservatory of Santiago de Cuba 1998. She has been studying Spanish and Spanish literature, culture and music at the Nueva Universidad de Granada 1988–1989. As a singer Pauliina May specialized herself in Afro-Cuban music already in Finland and many specialists opinioned her to be one of the best interpreter of the Afro-Cuban genre in Finland. She made also concerts in jazz genre in Finland. Beside her mother tongue Finnish, May speaks Spanish, English and Dutch. She studied as well Portuguese and French.

== Competitions and rewards ==
In 1993 Pauliina May won the second prize of the Finnish jazz competition Lady Summertime. In 2001 she took part of the Erasmus Jazz Price –competition held for all instrumentalists in Rotterdam, The Netherlands, where she was rewarded with the second prize with trombonist Louk Boudesteijn winning the first.

== Orchestras ==
In Finland Pauliina May has performed with various orchestras: UMO Jazz Orchestra, Jazztiikerit, Pauliina's Bounce, Pauliina May Jazz Quintet, El Septeto, Septeto Son, Fiestecita, Grupo Aché, Sami y Su Conjunto, Son Sabroson. In The Netherlands with Lucas van Merwijk & The Cubop City Big Band, Azucaraba, Pauliina y La Banda IrÉ, Son Caribe, Rumbatá, Saoco Masters of Salsa.

Pauliina May has been invited as a guest vocalists with Big Bands, like Turku Big Band (2000), UMO Jazz Orchestra (2002), in The Netherlands and Romanian Radio Big Band in Bucharest (2006–2007), Oulunkylä Pop&Jazz Big Band (Helsinki, Finland) and Rotterdam Conservatory Big Band (The Netherlands).

== Performances ==
- 1991–1996 Helsinki Winter Carnaval, Hotel Hesperia, Finland.
- 1993 Tour in Sweden and Norway with El Septeto
- 1996 Imatra Big Band Festival, Finland: Pauliina Pohjanheimo lead vocalist with Settlement Big Band
- 1998 Caribbean Islands tour (St. Maarten, Curaçao, Bonaire and Aruba): Pauliina May with Azucaraba
- 1999 Leading vocalist of the Tango Orquesta Otra (Rotterdams Conservatorium) in Berlin
- 1999 North Sea Jazz Festival, The Netherlands: Pauliina y La Banda IrÉ
- 2000 Imatra Big Band Festival, Finland: Pauliina y La Banda IrE
- 2001 Tallinn, Estonia: Pauliina May lead vocalist with Estonian Dream Big Band
- 2002 JUMO Jazz Club, Helsinki, Finland: Pauliina May lead vocalist with UMO Jazz Orchestra, Conductor Jere Laukkanen
- 2002 Dubrovnik New Year Celebration, Croatia: Pauliina May lead vocalist with Saoco-masters of Salsa
- 2004 and 2005 Kajaanin Runoviikko (Poem Week of Kajaani), Kajaani, Finland: Aina band.
- 2006 EBU (Euroopan Broadcasting Union) Salsa Concert in Bucharest, Romania: Pauliina May lead vocalist with Radio Romania Big Band, Conductor Jere Laukkanen. Broadcast live on radio stations around Europe.
- 2007 EBU Concert Bucuresti – oras al muzicii: Concert de Jazz, Bucharest, Romania. Pauliina May lead vocalist with Radio Romania Big Band. Compositions of Jukka Linkola. Broadcast live via satellite to 21 countries in Europe. (YLE Radio1, 8 May 2007).
- 2007 Opening of the exhibition of Akseli Gallen-Kallela at Groningen Museum, Groningen, The Netherlands: Aina band.
- 2008 Geuzen Medals Ceremony at the Church of Vlaardingen, The Netherlands 13 March 2008: Duo Pauliina May with Pianist, Composer Izak Boom. Geuzen Medal was awarded to former Finnish president Martti Ahtisaari for his work and dedication as expert mediator in many international conflicts and civil wars. Her Majesty the Queen Beatrix was present at the Award Ceremony.
- 10.3. 2017 Afro-Cuban Night –concert at Hamburger Börs, Turku. Lead Vocalist with Turku Jazz Orchestra, Conductor Jere Laukkanen

== TV-performances ==
- Concert: Siihen ei ole sanoja (There Are No Words for It) YLE (Finnish Broadcasting Company) TV1, music series Sinun tähtesi – Your Star: Pauliina Pohjanheimo, 1996. Music of Composer Toni Edelmann into the poems of Poet Veijo Baltzar.
- 1997 May appeared in the TV series by YLE TV1 of the Afro-Cuban music in Finland: Hei, Mambo!
- In The Netherlands Pauliina May has been appearing in TV: t' Pakhuis/NPS (2001), together with percussionist Martin Verdonk and at the Klokhuis/VPRO, together with Son Caribe -orchestra.
- 2008 live broadcast of the Geuzen Medal Award (Geuzenpenning) from The Church Vlaardingen. Three compositions of Izak Boom into the poems of Eino Leino. Kijk tv / Look TV, The Netherlands.
- 1998 in Curaçao TV she performed together with Azucaraba-salsa group.

== Discography ==
- El Septeto: Somos El Septeto, Helsinki, Mipu Music (MIPUCD202)
- Siihen ei ole sanoja (PAUCD 001). Pauliina Pohjanheimo – vocals, Tessa Virta – piano, Olli Peuhu – bass. Compositions Toni Edelmann, poems Veijo Baltzar. 1994. (Finland). Producers Olli Peuhu, Pauliina and Erkki Pohjanheimo)
- Azucaraba: Caminos por andar, Via Records 9920462, The Netherlands 1998. Azucaraba featuring Pauliina May.
- Son Sabroson y C.H.A.: Entre salsa y son. Alba Records / FG-Naxos, 2004.
- Aina Leino (BMCD 496). Aina featuring Pauliina May. Compositions Izak Boom into poems of Eino Leino. Publisher Munich Records, The Netherlands, 2005.
- Salsa Mundial – Gerardo Rosales (WBL044). A Finnish tango Rakastan, rakastan, rakastan salsa version Rakastan (comp & lyrics by Veikko Niittynen, arrangement by Mika Toivanen – Thomas Böttcher) Publisher Callejero Music Productions, The Netherlands/Venezuela, 2008

== Family ==
Pauliina's mother is Arja Pohjanheimo and her father Erkki Pohjanheimo. Her sister is a Finnish Actress Petriikka Pohjanheimo.
