= Teija Sopanen =

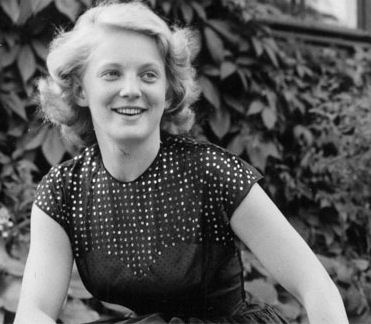
- Teija Sopanen in 1953.
- Born: 26 January 1933; Helsinki
- Died: 4 October 2011 (aged 78); Helsinki
- Occupations: Actress, journalist, announcer
- Years active: 1953–2004
- Spouses: Matti Oravisto (m. 1954; div. 1964); Pertti Purhonen (m. 1970; div. 1974); Lauri Väärä (m. 1979; d. 2011)
- Children: 2

Teija Sopanen (born Teija Anneli Väärä, formerly Purhonen 1970–1974, formerly Oravisto, née Sopanen; 26 January 1933 – 4 October 2011 ) was a Finnish television announcer, journalist, beauty queen and film actress.

== Early life ==
During the Continuation War in 1943, ten-year-old Teija was sent to Sweden as a war child. She completed her high school diploma in 1952. The Sopanens were living in Tampere at the time, where they had moved via Lappeenranta and Varkaus. From Tampere, Teija Sopanen went to the University of Helsinki to study languages. A couple of years later, her parents moved from Tampere to Kruununhaka, Helsinki.

== Career ==
=== Miss and movie star ===
Teija Sopanen was chosen as Miss Finland in 1953, and received a trip to the United States to represent Finland at the Miss Universe pageant in Long Beach, California.

After the beauty contest, Sopanen acted in films. Her first appearance was a supporting role in the film Rakastin sinua, Hilde (1954), followed by smaller roles in the filmsTyttö tuli taloon and Tyttö lähtee kasarmiin. In 1958, Sopanen played the central role of Ilona Ahlgren in Valentin Vaala's color film Niskavuoren naiset. In the same year, she played the role of Hilka in Vaala's film Nuori mylläri. The following year, she was Tauno Palo's opposite in the film Kovaa peliä Pohjolassa.

Sopanen's later screen roles were mostly cameo appearances as reporters or television announcers.
