= Nina Åström =

Finnish singer

Nina Susann Åström (née Lindkvist, born 1962), is a Finland Swede Christian singer-songwriter, pianist and evangelist.

== Early life ==
Nina Åström (née Lindkvist) was born on the Swedish-speaking west coast of Finland. She has two siblings. She graduated high school in Kokkola in 1981, and completed her MA in English philology at the University of Turku in 1986.

Åström became a committed Christian when she was 17 after some years of struggling with the questions of salvation, and surrender to Jesus.

== Career ==
Åström began writing songs in her early twenties. She began to perform regularly towards the end of the 1980s. Her first album, Person 2 Person, was released in 1992.

In 1992 she was invited to perform at the Christian Artists Seminar in the Netherlands. Through this event she was invited to perform on a Dutch TV program. The producer of the program, Gerrit aan't Goor, then offered to become her manager. Aan't Goor became Åström's main lyric writer until 2003. During this Åström collaborated with several artists including Luca Genta, Ralph van Manen, Buddy Miller, Julie Miller and Phil Keaggy.

Nina represented Finland in the Eurovision Song Contest in the year 2000 with the song "A Little Bit" (written by aan't Goor/Genta)

In 2001 she was asked to join Ilkka Puhakka and Reijo "Klinu" Loikkanen for evangelistic tours in Russian prisons. Since then she has been touring regularly in some 400 prisons and drug rehab centers, particularly within the former Soviet Union countries. Åström has performed in over 20 countries.

In her home province of Kokkola, she has acted as a UNICEF goodwill ambassador.

In 2007 Åström started songwriting again. She also produced her own album, Landscape of My Soul. In 2010, she released The Way We Are. She released a Finnish language album in spring 2012, under the name Avoin taivas; the album sold gold in Finland in June 2013. In 2019 Nina released an English compilation album, including new recordings of her "trademark" song Freedom within prison walls and the album title song Give me Jesus.

In 2016 a biography "Nina Åström Toisin silmin" was published, written by Leevi Launonen.

Åström teaches seminars and carries out coaching/mentoring both in Finland and abroad on what it means to be a Christian artist and communicator.

== Personal life ==
Åström is married to Benni Åström, and the couple has twin daughters. She belongs to a Lutheran congregation.

Åström has taught the English and Swedish languages for short periods of time.

Åström's pop/folk style of music is influenced by artists including James Taylor, The Carpenters, Stevie Wonder and Jennifer Warnes.

C.S. Lewis, Tim Keller and Watchman Nee, among others, have had significant impact on Åström through their literature and sermons. The basic foundation for her life and thinking is her relationship with Jesus Christ.

== Discography ==
- Person 2 Person (1992)
- A Matter of Time (1993)
- Moods (1995)
- A Friend (1999)
- A Little Bit of Love (2000)
- Vierelle jäät (Finnish version of "A Friend") (2000)
- Merry Christmas Jesus (2001)
- Real Life (2003)
- Landscape of My Soul (2007)
- The Way We Are (2010)
- Avoin taivas (2012) Gold album in Finland (2013)
- Minun aarteeni (2014)
- Joulun kuningas (2014)
- Takaisin kotiin (2016)
- Rauhaa ja rohkeutta (2018)
- Frid och frimodighet (2019) (Swedish version of Rauhaa ja rohkeutta)
- Give me Jesus (2019)

== Other ==
- Nina Åström Toisin silmin; biography by Leevi Launonen (2016)
- Nina Åström lukee Luukkaan tekstejä; audio book (2016)

== See also ==
- List of Finnish singers
