= Taisto Tammi =

Finnish singer

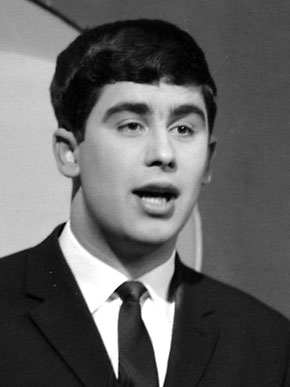
- Taisto Tammi in 1960

Taisto Lundberg, known by his stage name Taisto Tammi, (December 10, 1945, Kuusankoski - February 5, 1979, Tampere) was a Finnish schlager singer. He was the first Finnish Romani singer to record and became especially known as an interpreter of tangos by Toivo Kärki.

His greatest popularity was in the early 1960s, when his most famous songs were Tango merellä, Tangotyttö and Rakkauden rikkaus. With the latter song, he participated in the Finnish national selection for the Eurovision Song Contest in 1964. Tango merellä recorded in the spring of 1963 was huge success and it became classic. In 1964, Tammi was chosen as Finland's best male singer.

== Discography ==
- Taisto Tammen tangoja (Finnlevy 1969)
- Taisto Tammi laulaa kotimaisia tangoja (Finnlevy 1975)
- Muistojeni ruusut (Finnlevy 1976)
- Näitä lauloi Olavi Virta (Extra Sound 1978)
- Unohtumattomat (Finnlevy 1979)
- 20 suosikkia – tango merellä (Fazer Records 1996)
- 20 suosikkia – muistojeni ruusut (Warner Music Finland 2001)
- Nostalgia (Warner Music Finland 2006)
- 30 suosikkia – Tähtisarja (Warner Music Finland 2009)
- Tangolaulaja (Valitut Palat 2017)
