= Jani Juntunen =

Radio host

Jani Juntunen is a Finnish Radio host. He is known for his radio broadcasts on Radiomafia and Radio Rock. He hosted the Yle TV1 programme NOW and the list and was the Finnish commentator at the Eurovision Song Contest between 1999 and 2001.
