= Mervi Pohjanheimo =

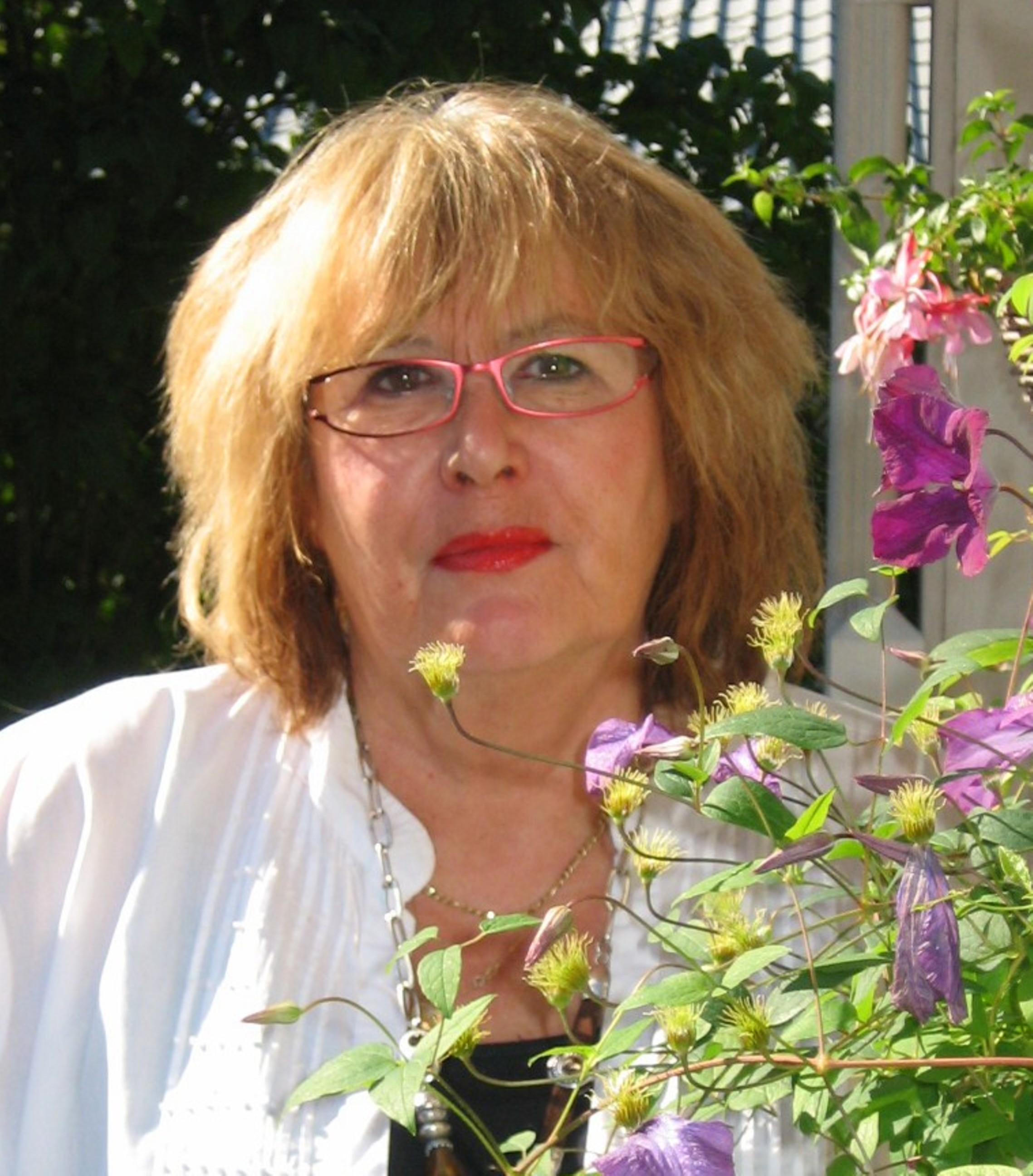
Mervi Pohjanheimo

Mervi Pohjanheimo (born 20 June 1945) is a Finnish television director and producer. She has directed and produced television entertainment shows for a Finnish television network called Oy Mainos-TV-Reklam Ab, later MTV3, since the late 1970s. Pohjanheimo was born in Mäntyharju.

== Filmography ==
Director

- Tupla tai kuitti (1972-1973)
- Piikkis (1987)
- Ilettääkö (1988)
- Levyraati (1988)
- Enkelten keittiö (1989)
- Seppo Hovin seurassa (1990)
- Hecumania (1996)
- Tangomarkkinat (1999)
- Koivula ja tähdet (2000)
- MTV3 Live: Joulun tähti (2002)
- Aarresaaren sankarit (2003)

Producer

- Hecumania (1996)
- MTV3 Live: Joulun tähti (2002)
