= Erkki Pohjanheimo =

Finnish television producer and director (born 1942)

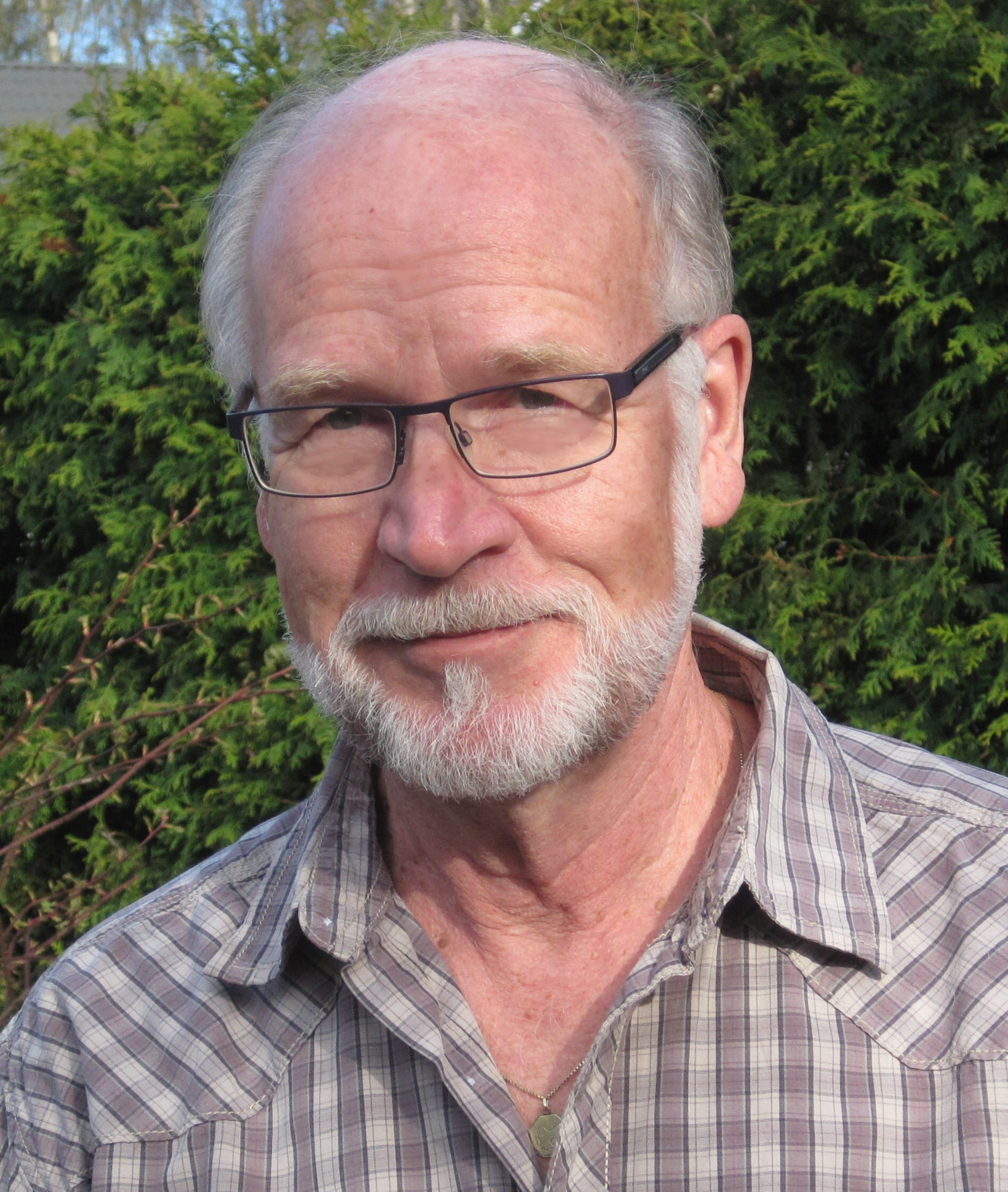
- Pohjanheimo in 2012
- Born: 28 January 1942 (age 84); Multia, Finland
- Education: University of Helsinki
- Occupations: Television producer, television director, singer, television presenter
- Employer: YLE
- Spouse: Mervi Pohjanheimo

Erkki Pohjanheimo (born 28 January 1942) is a Finnish television producer and director.

== Television career ==
Pohjanheimo joined Yleisradio in 1961 as a television cameraman and worked as a cameraman for five years. In 1966 Pohjanheimo was appointed director of entertainment at TV1 and later became a journalist, screenwriter and editor manager of entertainment. During the 1970s Pohjanheimo produced and directed various music programmes and collaborated with other musicians including The Spencer Davis Group, Cilla Black, Lena Horne, Sarah Vaughan, Benny Goodman and Lionel Hampton. In 1982 he produced and directed a TV concert of Canto General in two parts with Mikis Theodorakis. In 1991 Pohjanheimo did a concert with Montserrat Caballé ja José Carreras for YLE TV1 in Turku. In 1994 Erkki Pohjanheimo's documentary of Kings Singers was shot for television in Tallinn, Estonia and in Helsinki as well as in Lahti and in Hollola, Finland. Pohjanheimo produced and directed also a concert of Natalie Cole in Turku in 1992.

Erkki Pohjanheimo also produced and directed pop and rock music series for YLE TV1 as Valmiina ...Pyörii! 1967 and Pop Story 1971-1972.

For Yleisradio, Pohjanheimo produced and directed two folk operas based on Suomen Kansan vanhat runot (Old Poems of the Finnish People), Karannut hevonen (Runaway Horse, 1978) and Pietarin miilu (Charcoal of St Petersburg, 1979). The Composer of Karannut hevonen was Heikki Valpola and the libretto was by Sulevi Peltola. The authors of Pietarin miilu were Toni Edelmann and Ilpo Tiihonen.

1987-1995 Erkki Pohjanheimo produced and directed for television an international song contest Midnight Sun Song Festival (Keskiyön auringon laulufestivaali) from Lahti, Finland. The festival was organized by Lahden Sävel ry.

1995 Indonesian television TVRI invited Pohjanheimo to be the Production Designer, Sub-Producer and Visual Designer of the big three-day international song competition Indonesia International Song Festival 1995. Pohjanheimo took with him a Lighting Designer, three Sound Designers, a Stedicam Operator from the Finnish Broadcasting Corporation YLE. His wife Producer-Director Mervi Pohjanheimo worked as a Producer's Assistant. The competition was held at the Jakarta Convention Center from 4 to 8 August 1995.

Over the years Pohjanheimo has been associated with the European Broadcasting Union and the Eurovision Network he also provided the Finnish television commentary for the Eurovision Song Contest on ten occasions between 1973 and 1996 he also hosted the Finnish heat for the 1981 Contest.

Since 1997 Erkki Pohjanheimo has set up his own television company Sunny Notes Oy. Pohjanheimo closed his company when he retired in 2013.

== Musical career ==
Erkki Pohjanheimo has worked also as a singer and sung some records between 1962 and 1967. His most popular songs include:

- Kutsukaa tri Casey (Callin' Doctor Casey), 1963
- Limbo Rock, 1963
- Jos lähdet (Non ha piu luce il mondo), 1964
- Lapin taikarummut (Magic Drums Of Lapland), 1965
- Niin paljon kuuluu rakkauteen (Love Is A Many Splendored Thing), 1965
- Yö katseessasi (Charade), 1964
- Kaunein aamuisin (Mary In The Morning), 1967
- Kun taas tavattiin (The Day I Met Marie), 1967

He sang in the dance band of Jorma Weneskoski and later he had his own dance orchestra.

== Book Publications ==
Erkki Pohjanheimo has published a book of memoirs about his working life as a singer and television journalist-producer: NAUHA PYÖRII JA KAMERA KÄY – Matkani levytysstudiosta TV-ohjaamoon (The tape is rolling and the camera Is running - My journey from the Recording Studio to the TV Master Control Room) in Finnish. Publisher: Aurinko Kustannus, Finland, 2022, 343 + 16 pages, ISBN 978-952-230-805-4.

Erkki Pohjanheimo’s second book was published in 2026. RAKKAANI ON LENTÄJÄ SODASSA – Raili Valkolan ja kapteeni Erkki Pohjanheimon liikuttava tarina 700 kirjeessä. (My Beloved Is a Pilot at War – The moving story of Raili Valkola and Captain Erkki Pohjanheimo told through 700 letters); a memoir in Finnish. Publisher: Ketterät Kirjat Oy, 2026, ISBN 978-952-7518-86-1 (hardcover), ISBN 978-952-7518-87-8 (e-book)

== Family ==
Erkki Pohjanheimo has two daughters, Singer and Vocal Pedagogue Pauliina Pohjanheimo (artist name Pauliina May) and Actress-Singer Petriikka Pohjanheimo.
