= The Voice (Eimear Quinn song) =

1996 song by Eimear Quinn

Single by Eimear Quinn
- Released: 1996
- Studio: Windmill Lane Studios
- Genre: Celtic music
- Length: 3:05
- Label: Ainm Records; CNR Music; Polydor
- Songwriter: Brendan Graham

Eurovision Song Contest 1996 entry
- Country: Ireland
- Artist: Eimear Quinn
- Language: English
- Composer: Brendan Graham
- Lyricist: Brendan Graham
- Conductor: Noel Kelehan

Finals performance
- Final result: 1st
- Final points: 162

Entry chronology
- ◄ "Dreamin'" (1995)
- "Mysterious Woman" (1997) ►

Official performance video
- "The Voice" on YouTube

"The Voice" is a song recorded by Irish singer and composer Eimear Quinn with music composed and lyrics written by Brendan Graham. It represented Ireland in the Eurovision Song Contest 1996 held in Oslo, resulting an unprecedented fourth win in five consecutive years for a country in the contest, being Ireland's seventh overall win, and its last win to date. The single, released by Ainm Records, CNR Music and Polydor, peaked at number three in Ireland and number nine in Belgium, and was a top-30 hit in the Netherlands and a top-40 hit in the UK and Sweden. It features subliminal voices by Graham and Tracey Cullen.

== Background ==
=== Conception ===
"The Voice" was composed, and lyrics written, by Brendan Graham, who had also written and composed "Rock 'n' Roll Kids", the Irish winner of the 1994 contest.

Lyrically, "The Voice" is a very Celtic-inspired song, with the singer portraying herself as "the voice" which watches over the world, describing "her" effects on the elements, such as the wind, the seasons, in a similar way to Mother Nature. It is of a folk style and is sung at a very high pitch accompanied by traditional Irish percussion, woodwind and string instruments.

=== National selection ===
Graham had originally submitted "The Voice" via a recording made by the neo-traditional Celtic band Dervish to Raidió Teilifís Éireann (RTÉ) for consideration to enter in the national final RTÉ was organising to select its song and performer for the 41st edition of the Eurovision Song Contest. However, after the song had been advanced to the final, Graham attended a performance by the Anúna chorale at Christ Church Cathedral in Dublin, where he was struck by the voice of Anúna member Eimear Quinn. Graham was, indeed, so struck by her voice that he recruited Quinn to perform "The Voice" on the national final held at the Point Theatre in Dublin on 6 March 1996. Of the eight songs in the national final, "The Voice" was the clear winner, with the participating ten regional juries awarding the song 105 points, 21 more points than the runner-up, becoming the Irish entrant –and Quinn, the performer– for Eurovision.

=== Eurovision ===
The Eurovision Song Contest 1996 featured a pre-qualifying round in which audio tapes of each nation's entrant were sent to juries in all of the other twenty-nine nations competing: from these tapes, each jury deemed ten songs worthy of competing in the contest and the resultant tally allowed only twenty-two of the prospective entrants to advance to the Eurovision final to compete with the Norwegian entrant already pre-selected: "I evighet" by Elisabeth Andreassen had already qualified for the final after Norway won the previous contest with "Nocturne" by Secret Garden. "The Voice" was the second highest qualifying entry, its 198-point tally beaten only by Sweden's "Den vilda" by One More Time whose point tally was 227. The specific placings in the pre-qualifying round were confidential and only leaked some time after the final: however "The Voice" was viewed as a strong contender going into the final for Eurovision 1996 with a Top 5 placing predicted.

On 18 May 1996, the Eurovision Song Contest final was held at the Oslo Spektrum in Oslo hosted by Norsk rikskringkasting (NRK) and broadcast live throughout the continent. Quinn performed "The Voice" seventeenth on the evening, following Belgium's "Liefde is een kaartspel" by Lisa del Bo and preceding Finland's "Niin kaunis on taivas" by Jasmine. Noel Kelehan conducted the event's live orchestra in the performance of the Irish entry.

At the close of voting, "The Voice" placed first in a field of twenty-three with 162 points, easily besting both "I evighet" and "Den vilda" whose tallies of 114 and 100 points earned Eurovision 1996 final placings of respectively second- and third-place. "The Voice" was awarded the maximum douze points by seven countries: Turkey, Switzerland, Estonia, Slovenia, Netherlands, Poland and Bosnia and Herzegovina. The victory, which was Ireland's fourth in five years, was their seventh – and to date last – contest victory, setting a record for the most contests won by a single country that would only be tied by Sweden in 2023 with the song "Tattoo". "The Voice" was succeeded as Irish representative at the 1997 contest by "Mysterious Woman" by Marc Roberts and as Eurovision winner in 1997 by "Love Shine a Light" by Katrina and the Waves representing the United Kingdom.

== Critical reception ==
On 4 May 1996, fourteen days before the Eurovision Song Contest, Mark Roland from Melody Maker reviewed the single, writing, "They've gone for the authentic Irish folky sound with fiddles, whistles and bodhrans, she has a voice of spun glass and I'm sure she'll win".

== Commercial performance ==
"The Voice" reached number three in Ireland but failed to become a major international hit with its only other evident top ten showing being in Belgium, where it reached number nine on the Dutch region charts. "The Voice" also charted in the Netherlands at number 21, on Belgium's French region charts at number 30, in Sweden at number 31 and in the UK at number 40.

=== Weekly charts ===
Chart (1996)	Peak position
Belgium (Ultratop 50 Flanders)	9
Belgium (Ultratop 50 Wallonia)	30
Europe (Eurochart Hot 100)	54
Ireland (IRMA)	3
Netherlands (Dutch Top 40)	22
Netherlands (Single Top 100)	21
Scottish Singles Sales (Official Charts)	47
Sweden (Sverigetopplistan)	31
UK Singles (Official Charts)	40

=== Year-end charts ===
Chart (1996)	Position
Belgium (Ultratop 50 Flanders)	94

== Legacy ==
Beginning in 2006 and 2007 with A New Journey, "The Voice" became a staple of the repertoire of Celtic Woman. Lisa Kelly, one of its members at the time, originated its version and then Susan McFadden took this melody.

Preceded by "Nocturne" by Secret Garden	Eurovision Song Contest winners 1996	Succeeded by "Love Shine a Light" by Katrina and the Waves
