= Ireland in the Eurovision Song Contest 1996 =

- Eurovision Song Contest 1996
- Participating broadcaster: Radio Telefís Éireann (RTÉ)
- Country: Ireland
- Selection process: Eurosong '96
- Selection date: 3 March 1996

Competing entry
- Song: "The Voice"
- Artist: Eimear Quinn
- Songwriter: Brendan Graham

Placement
- Final result: 1st, 162 points

Participation chronology

Ireland was represented at the Eurovision Song Contest 1996 with the song "The Voice", written by Brendan Graham, and performed by Eimear Quinn. The Irish participating broadcaster, Radio Telefís Éireann (RTÉ), selected its entry through a national final, which eventually won the contest.

== Before Eurovision ==
=== Eurosong '96 ===
==== Réalta '96 ====
Réalta was a radio song contest started in 1995 by RTÉ Raidió na Gaeltachta exclusively for Irish songs. The first edition of the contest was not related to Eurosong, but from 1996 until 1999, the recent winner of Réalta would qualify to Eurosong. The 2nd edition of Réalta took place on 22 December 1995 and the results were decided by a panel of 3 judges. The running order and results of Réalta '96 are unknown.

Réalta '96
Artist	Song
Art Ó Dufaigh	"Leathshúil ar do chroí"
Cathal Ó Catháin	"Camán, camán"
Colm Mac Séalaigh	"Cé h-é?"
Damien Mac Gabhann	"Róisín"
Declan Masterson	"Goirm í"
Gearóid Ó Murchú	"Siúlach scéalach"
Helen Uí Dhunaird	"Amárach"
Mary Gallagher	"Go fóill beag, slán"
Seán Monaghan	"An ronnach"
Seosamh Ó Flatharta & Mómó Uí Churraoin	"Lámh an bhádóra"

==== Final ====
RTÉ held Eurosong '96 on 3 March 1996 at the Point Theatre in Dublin, hosted by Pat Kenny. Eight entries competed in the final and the winner, "The Voice" performed by Eimear Quinn, was determined by the votes of ten regional juries.

Eurosong '96 – 3 March 1996
R/O	Artist	Song	Songwriter(s)	Points	Place
1	Rob Burke Band	"Gotta Know Right Now"	Rob Burke, Tony Burke	76	3
2	Dav McNamara	"Missing You"	Raymond Smyth	84	2
3	William Byrne and Lorraine Nolan	"Once Again"	Peter Becket	61	5
4	Eimear Quinn	"The Voice"	Brendan Graham	105	1
5	Marion Fossett	"This Time"	Marion Fossett	40	8
6	Yvonne Holmes	"Find My Way"	Richard Speedie	73	4
7	Seán Monaghan	"Amhrán an ronnach"	Seán Monaghan	61	5
8	Maura Donaghy	"Worlds Apart"	Stephen Nimmon	50	7

Detailed Regional Jury Votes
R/O	Song	Athlone	Cork	Donegal	Dublin	Dundalk	Galway	Kenmare	Limerick	Waterford	Westport	Total
1	"Gotta Know Right Now"	5	8	8	8	10	8	8	8	3	10	76
2	"Missing You"	10	12	12	7	5	3	12	5	12	6	84
3	"Once Again"	6	7	4	6	7	6	10	7	5	3	61
4	"The Voice"	12	10	10	12	8	12	7	12	10	12	105
5	"This Time"	3	4	3	4	3	4	5	6	4	4	40
6	"Find My Way"	7	5	6	10	12	10	6	4	8	5	73
7	"Amhrán an Ronnach"	4	6	7	5	4	7	4	10	6	8	61
8	"Worlds Apart"	8	3	5	3	6	5	3	3	7	7	50

== At Eurovision ==
As part of the European Broadcasting Union's (EBU) scheme to limit the growing number of countries wishing to participate, audio recordings of the entries were sent to juries in each participating country some weeks before the contest. The juries listened to the songs, and awarded points to their ten favorites. Of the 29 countries wishing to participate (host country Norway was exempt from the process), only the 22 highest-scorers were allowed to perform in the Eurovision Song Contest 1996. In this qualifying round, "The Voice" came in 2nd place with 187 points, and confirmed an Irish presence in Oslo that year.

Quinn performed 17th in the running order on the night of the contest. "The Voice" went on to win with 162 points, giving Ireland its seventh overall victory, and its fourth in five years.

=== Voting ===
==== Qualifying round ====
Points awarded to Ireland (qualifying round)
Score	Country
12 points	Austria; Bosnia and Herzegovina; Iceland; United Kingdom
10 points	Estonia; Finland; Greece; Israel; Poland; Slovakia; Slovenia; Sweden; Turkey
8 points	Belgium; Cyprus; France
7 points	Russia; Switzerland
6 points	Macedonia; Netherlands
5 points	
4 points	
3 points	Denmark; Portugal
2 points	Hungary; Spain
1 point	

Points awarded by Ireland (qualifying round)
Score	Country
12 points	Sweden
10 points	Slovenia
8 points	United Kingdom
7 points	Switzerland
6 points	Malta
5 points	France
4 points	Belgium
3 points	Netherlands
2 points	Denmark
1 point	Romania

==== Final ====
Points awarded to Ireland (final)
Score	Country
12 points	Bosnia and Herzegovina; Estonia; Netherlands; Poland; Slovenia; Switzerland; Turkey
10 points	Finland; Greece; Norway
8 points	Portugal
7 points	Austria; Slovakia; Sweden
6 points	Cyprus; France
5 points	
4 points	Malta
3 points	Belgium
2 points	
1 point	

Points awarded by Ireland (final)
Score	Country
12 points	Sweden
10 points	Iceland
8 points	Austria
7 points	Norway
6 points	Croatia
5 points	Netherlands
4 points	Switzerland
3 points	United Kingdom
2 points	Estonia
1 point	Cyprus
