= Macedonia in the Eurovision Song Contest 1996 =

- Eurovision Song Contest 1996
- Participating broadcaster: Macedonian Radio Television (MRT)
- Country: Macedonia
- Selection process: Skopje Fest 1996
- Selection date: 3 March 1996

Competing entry
- Song: "Samo ti"
- Artist: Kaliopi
- Songwriter: Kaliopi

Placement
- Final result: Failed to qualify (26th)

Participation chronology

Macedonia (Note: Officially under the provisional appellation "former Yugoslav Republic of Macedonia", abbreviated "FYR Macedonia".) was represented at the qualifying round for the Eurovision Song Contest 1996, with the song "Samo ti", written and performed by Kaliopi. The Macedonian participating broadcaster, Macedonian Radio Television (MRT), selected its entry through Skopje Fest 1996. The entry, which would have been the first-ever entry from independent Macedonia in the Eurovision Song Contest, failed to make it through the pre-selection round.

== Before Eurovision ==
=== Skopje Fest 1996 ===
Macedonian Radio Television (MRT) held the national final on 3 March 1996 at the Makedonska Narodna Theatre in Skopje, hosted by Biljana Debarlieva and Borce Nikolovski. The winner was chosen by a combination of votes from an expert jury, radio stations across Macedonia, and the audience in the hall.

Final – 3 March 1996
R/O	Artist	Song	Points	Place
1	Marjan Nečak	"Marija" (Марија)	10	14
2	Erol Redžepagić	"Koga kje prestanat solzite" (Кога ќе престанат солзите)	0	18
3	Margica Antevska	"Te nema da go slušame Šopen" (Те нема да го слушаме Шопен)	6	15
4	Jon Ilija Apelgrin	"Spomeni" (Спомени)	17	12
5	Leonarda and Trio Eka	"Kambanite vo nokjta zvonat" (Камбаните во ноќта ѕвонат)	45	7
6	Kiril Kotevski	"Dali nokjva si sonuvala" (Дали ноќва си сонувала)	3	16
7	Katerina Micanova and Goce	"Zarobeni od džezot" (Заробени од џезот)	0	18
8	Miki Jovanovski-Džafer	"Kolku vredi ljubovta" (Колку вреди љубовта)	11	13
9	Karolina Gočeva	"Ma ajde kazi mi" (Ма ајде кажи ми)	29	9
10	Sašo Kaimovski	"Zaboravi" (Заборави)	87	6
11	Silvi Band	"Srekjna karta" (Среќна карта)	2	17
12	Dejan Kuzmanovski and Petar Reinov	"Gospod prostuva" (Господ простува)	0	18
13	Duo Marotov	"Tugja žena" (Туѓа жена)	24	11
14	Intervali	"Pak e prolet" (Пак е пролет)	143	4
15	Cvetanka Gligorova	"Vo tvojot pogled" (Во твојот поглед)	127	5
16	Tanja Carovska	"Kade li leta" (Каде ли лета)	28	10
17	Tijana Todevska	"Ti prostuvam" (Ти простувам)	223	3
18	Kaliopi	"Samo ti" (Само ти)	411	1
19	Avantura	"Ti se budiš utrovo" (Ти се будиш утрово)	34	8
20	Maja Odžaklievska	"Prosti mi" (Прости ми)	329	2

== At Eurovision ==
In 1996, for the only time in Eurovision history, an audio-only qualifying round (from which hosts Norway were exempt) was held on 20 March as 29 countries wished to participate in the final but the European Broadcasting Union had set a limit of 22 (plus Norway). The countries occupying the bottom seven places after the pre-qualifier would be unable to take part in the main contest. Kaliopi was not among those to qualify, placing joint 26th with 14 points and eliminating Macedonia from the contest.

Macedonia would eventually debut two years later, in 1998.

=== Voting ===
Points awarded to Macedonia (qualifying round)
Score	Country
12 points	
10 points	
8 points	
7 points	
6 points	
5 points	Slovenia
4 points	Hungary
3 points	
2 points	Croatia; Iceland
1 point	Netherlands

Points awarded by Macedonia (qualifying round)
Score	Country
12 points	Sweden
10 points	France
8 points	Switzerland
7 points	Netherlands
6 points	Ireland
5 points	Cyprus
4 points	Israel
3 points	Croatia
2 points	Denmark
1 point	Estonia
