= Denmark in the Eurovision Song Contest 1996 =

- Eurovision Song Contest 1996
- Participating broadcaster: Danmarks Radio (DR)
- Country: Denmark
- Selection process: Dansk Melodi Grand Prix 1996
- Selection date: 9 March 1996

Competing entry
- Song: "Kun med dig"
- Artist: Dorthe Andersen and Martin Loft
- Songwriters: Jascha Richter; Keld Heick

Placement
- Final result: Failed to qualify (25th)

Participation chronology

Denmark was represented at the qualifying round for the Eurovision Song Contest 1996 with the song "Kun med dig", written by Jascha Richter and Keld Heick, and performed by Dorthe Andersen and Martin Loft. The Danish participating broadcaster, Danmarks Radio (DR), organised the Dansk Melodi Grand Prix 1996 in order to select its entry for the contest. The entry failed to make it through the pre-selection round, meaning Denmark was not represented at the Eurovision Song Contest.

== Before Eurovision ==
=== Dansk Melodi Grand Prix 1996 ===
Danmarks Radio (DR) held the Dansk Melodi Grand Prix 1996 on 9 March at TV-Byen in Gladsaxe, hosted by Hans Otto Bisgård. Five songs competed in the contest and the winner was selected solely by a public televote. The results of the public televote were revealed by Denmark's regions and "Kun med dig" was an overwhelming winner, receiving more votes than the other four songs combined.

Final – 9 March 1996
R/O	Artist	Song	Songwriter(s)	Televote	Place
1	Peter Belli	"Det gør ondt når jeg griner"	Michael Hardinger	2,463	3
2	Master Fatman and Jannie Høeg	"I nat"	Anders Blickfeldt, Peter Viskinde	1,089	5
3	Channe Nussbaum	"Kys mig nu"	Lars Muhl	1,224	4
4	Dorthe Andersen and Martin Loft	"Kun med dig"	Jascha Richter, Keld Heick	9,422	1
5	Mark Linn	"Røde kinder"	Thomas Blachman	2,465	2

Detailed Regional Televoting Results
R/O	Song	Jutland					Funen	Islands	North Zealand	Capital Region	Total
R/O	Song	North	West	East	Central	South	Funen	Islands	North Zealand	Capital Region	Total
1	"Det gør ondt når jeg griner"	53	313	799	483	148	234	217	74	142	2,463
2	"I nat"	271	73	228	179	51	92	57	53	85	1,089
3	"Kys mig nu"	122	134	379	252	50	110	65	29	83	1,224
4	"Kun med dig"	1,282	1,417	2,407	1,366	828	967	478	339	338	9,422
5	"Røde kinder"	274	310	824	383	86	220	42	103	223	2,465

== At Eurovision ==
In 1996, for the only time in Eurovision history, an audio-only qualifying round (from which hosts Norway were exempt) was held on 20 March as 29 countries wished to participate in the final but the European Broadcasting Union had set a limit of 22 (plus Norway). The countries occupying the bottom seven places after the pre-qualifier would be unable to take part in the main contest. After the voting, "Kun med dig" had received 22 points, placing 25th and eliminating Denmark from the contest.

The contest was broadcast on DR TV (with commentary by Jørgen de Mylius) and on radio station DR P3 (with commentary by Katrine Nyland Sørensen, Martin Loft and Marianne Dinesen).

=== Voting ===
Points awarded to Denmark (qualifying round)
Score	Country
12 points	
10 points	
8 points	
7 points	
6 points	
5 points	Sweden
4 points	Bosnia and Herzegovina; Romania
3 points	Cyprus
2 points	Ireland; Macedonia
1 point	Hungary; Norway

Points awarded by Denmark (qualifying round)
Score	Country
12 points	Sweden
10 points	Netherlands
8 points	Estonia
7 points	United Kingdom
6 points	France
5 points	Germany
4 points	Slovenia
3 points	Ireland
2 points	Austria
1 point	Hungary
