= Eurovision Song Contest 1996 =

International song competition

Date and venue
- Final: 18 May 1996
- Venue: Oslo Spektrum; Oslo, Norway

Organisation
- Organiser: European Broadcasting Union (EBU)
- Scrutineer: Christine Marchal-Ortiz

Production
- Host broadcaster: Norsk rikskringkasting (NRK)
- Director: Pål Veiglum
- Executive producer: Odd Arvid Strømstad
- Musical director: Frode Thingnæs
- Presenters: Ingvild Bryn; Morten Harket

Participants
- Number of entries: 30
- Number of finalists: 23
- Returning countries: Estonia; Finland; Netherlands; Slovakia; Switzerland
- Non-returning countries: Denmark; Germany; Hungary; Israel; Russia
- Participation map: Finalist countries Countries eliminated in the qualifying round Countries that participated in the past but not in 1996

Vote
- Voting system: Each country awarded 12, 10, 8–1 points to their ten favourite songs
- Winning song: Ireland; "The Voice"

The Eurovision Song Contest 1996 was the 41st edition of the Eurovision Song Contest, held on 18 May 1996 at the Oslo Spektrum in Oslo, Norway, and presented by Ingvild Bryn and Morten Harket. It was organised by the European Broadcasting Union (EBU) and host broadcaster Norsk rikskringkasting (NRK), who staged the event after winning the 1995 contest for Norway with the song "Nocturne" by Secret Garden.

Broadcasters from thirty countries submitted entries to the contest, with a non-public, audio-only qualifying round held two months before the final to reduce the number of participants from 30 to 23. The entries from Denmark, Germany, Hungary, Israel, Macedonia, Romania, and Russia were subsequently eliminated, which resulted in Germany being absent from the contest for the first and to date only time.

The winner was Ireland with the song "The Voice", written by Brendan Graham and performed by Eimear Quinn. This gave the nation a record-extending seventh contest win, its fourth win in five years, with Graham also recording his second win as a songwriter in three years after having written the winning song in 1994. Norway, Sweden, Croatia, and Estonia rounded out the top five, with Croatia, Estonia, and Portugal, which placed sixth, achieving their best results to date. This was the final contest where the results were determined solely by jury voting, with a trial use of televoting in the following year's event leading to widespread adoption from 1998 onwards.

== Location ==
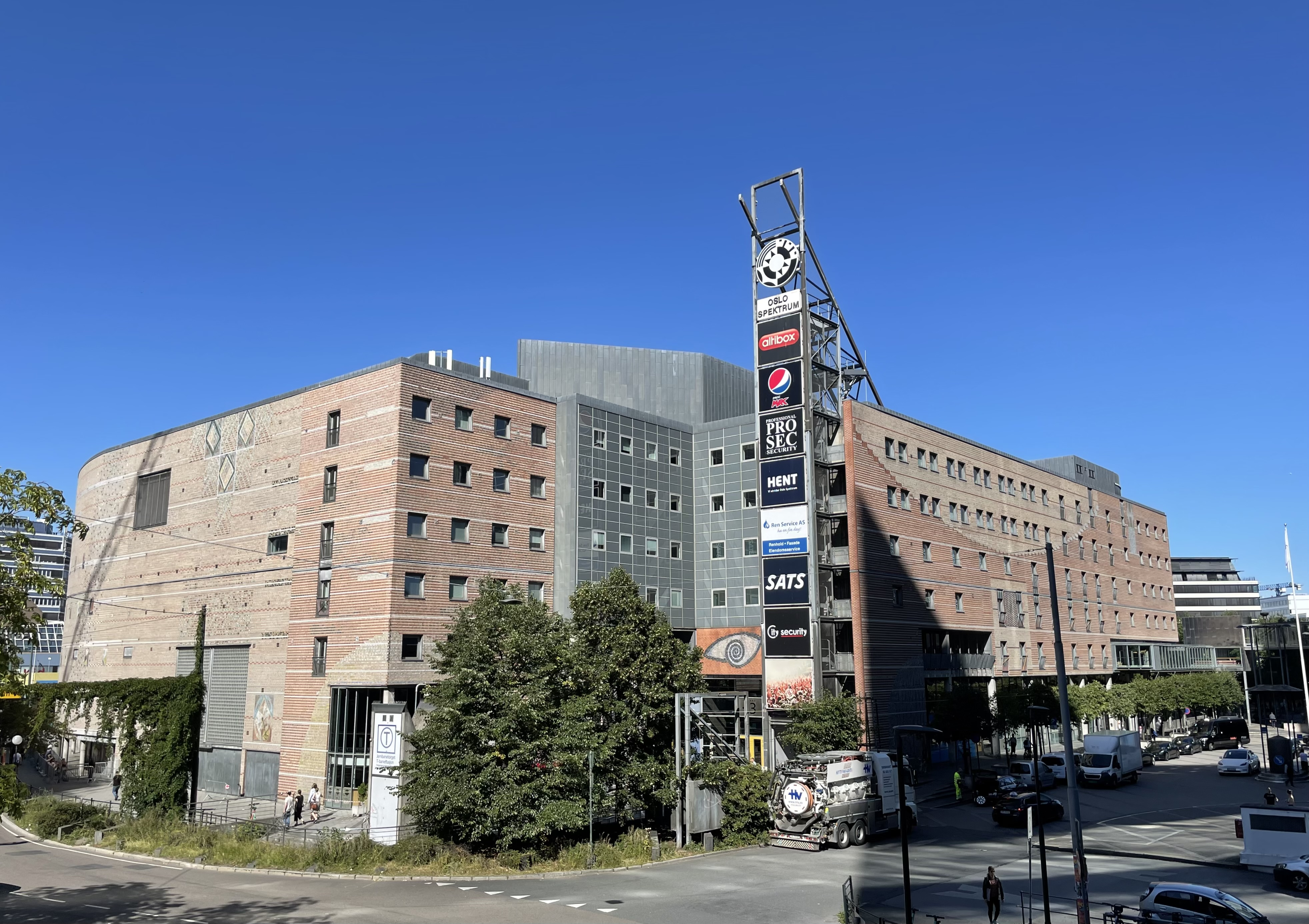
Oslo Spektrum, Oslo – host venue of the 1996 contest

The 1996 contest took place in Oslo, Norway, following the country's victory at the 1995 contest with the song "Nocturne", performed by Secret Garden. It was the second time that Norway had hosted the contest, following the 1986 contest staged in Bergen. Lillehammer, Bergen, and Trondheim also bid to host. The chosen venue was the Oslo Spektrum, an indoor arena opened in 1990 and located in the Sentrum district of the city, which has hosted music concerts, ice hockey matches, and the annual Nobel Peace Prize Concert. Around 6,000 spectators were present in the venue during the contest.

== Participants ==
Eurovision Song Contest 1996 – Participation summaries by country
- Austria; Belgium; Bosnia and Herzegovina; Croatia; Cyprus; Denmark; Estonia; Finland; France; Germany; Greece; Hungary; Iceland; Ireland; Israel; Macedonia; Malta; Netherlands; Norway; Poland; Portugal; Romania; Russia; Slovakia; Slovenia; Spain; Sweden; Switzerland; Turkey; United Kingdom
- Countries in italics failed to progress from the qualifying round

A total of thirty countries submitted entries for the 1996 contest, however per the rules of the event only twenty-three countries would be allowed to participate. Norway, by virtue of being the host country, was guaranteed a place, with all remaining countries competing in the qualifying round in order to gain a spot in the event. Initially broadcasters from thirty-three countries expressed an interest in participating, however planned entries from Bulgaria, Moldova, and Ukraine failed to materialise; these nations eventually made their contest debuts in the 2000s.

Three representatives who had performed as lead artists in previous contests featured among the performers at this event. Marianna Efstratiou had represented Greece in 1989, while Elisabeth Andreassen made her fourth appearance, having competed for Sweden in 1982 as a member of the band Chips, as well as representing Norway twice, winning the contest in 1985 as a member of Bobbysocks! and performing with Jan Werner Danielsen in 1994. Additionally, Georgina Abela, who had represented Malta in 1991 with Paul Giordimaina, returned as a backing singer for the Maltese entrant Miriam Christine.

Eurovision Song Contest 1996 participants
Country	Broadcaster	Artist	Song	Language	Songwriter(s)	Conductor
Austria	ORF	George Nussbaumer	"Weil's dr guat got"	German (Note: Specifically Vorarlbergisch, a High Alemannic dialect)	Mischa Krausz; George Nussbaumer	Mischa Krausz
Belgium	BRTN	Lisa del Bo	"Liefde is een kaartspel"	Dutch	Siirak Brogden; Daniël Ditmar; John Terra	Bob Porter
Bosnia and Herzegovina	RTVBiH	Amila Glamočak	"Za našu ljubav"	Bosnian	Sinan Alimanović; Adnan Bajramović; Aida Frljak	Sinan Alimanović
Croatia	HRT	Maja Blagdan	"Sveta ljubav"	Croatian	Zrinko Tutić	Alan Bjelinski
Cyprus	CyBC	Constantinos	"Mono gia mas" (Μόνο για μας)	Greek	Andreas Giorgallis; Rodoula Papalambrianou	Stavros Lantsias
Estonia	ETV	Maarja-Liis Ilus and Ivo Linna	"Kaelakee hääl"	Estonian	Priit Pajusaar; Kaari Sillamaa	Tarmo Leinatamm
Finland	YLE	Jasmine	"Niin kaunis on taivas"	Finnish	Timo Niemi	Olli Ahvenlahti
France	France Télévision	Dan Ar Braz and l'Héritage des Celtes	"Diwanit bugale"	Breton	Dan Ar Braz	Fiachra Trench
Greece	ERT	Marianna Efstratiou	"Emis forame to himona anixiatika" (Εμείς φοράμε το χειμώνα ανοιξιάτικα)	Greek	Kostas Bigalis; Iro Trigoni	Michalis Rozakis
Iceland	RÚV	Anna Mjöll	"Sjúbídú"	Icelandic	Anna Mjöll Ólafsdóttir; Ólafur Gaukur Þórhallsson	Ólafur Gaukur Þórhallsson
Ireland	RTÉ	Eimear Quinn	"The Voice"	English	Brendan Graham	Noel Kelehan
Malta	PBS	Miriam Christine	"In a Woman's Heart"	English	Paul Abela; Alfred Sant	Paul Abela
Netherlands	NOS	Maxine and Franklin Brown	"De eerste keer"	Dutch	Peter van Asten; Piet Souer	Dick Bakker
Norway	NRK	Elisabeth Andreassen	"I evighet"	Norwegian	Torhild Nigar	Frode Thingnæs
Poland	TVP	Kasia Kowalska	"Chcę znać swój grzech"	Polish	Robert Amirian; Kasia Kowalska	Wiesław Pieregorólka
Portugal	RTP	Lúcia Moniz	"O meu coração não tem cor"	Portuguese	José Fanha; Pedro Osório	Pedro Osório
Slovakia	STV	Marcel Palonder	"Kým nás máš"	Slovak	Juraj Burian; Jozef Urban	Juraj Burian
Slovenia	RTVSLO	Regina	"Dan najlepših sanj"	Slovene	Aleksander Kogoj	Jože Privšek
Spain	TVE	Antonio Carbonell	"Ay, qué deseo"	Spanish	Antonio Carmona; José Miguel Carmona; Juan Carmona	Eduardo Leiva
Sweden	SVT	One More Time	"Den vilda"	Swedish	Nanne Grönvall; Peter Grönvall	Anders Berglund
Switzerland	SRG SSR	Kathy Leander	"Mon cœur l'aime"	French	Régis Mounir	Rui dos Reis
Turkey	TRT	Şebnem Paker	"Beşinci Mevsim"	Turkish	Levent Çoker; Selma Çuhacı	Levent Çoker
United Kingdom	BBC	Gina G	"Ooh Aah... Just a Little Bit"	English	Steve Rodway; Simon Tauber	Ernie Dunstall

Entires which failed to progress from the qualifying round
Country	Broadcaster	Artist	Song	Language	Songwriter(s)
Denmark	DR	Dorthe Andersen and Martin Loft	"Kun med dig"	Danish	Keld Heick; Jascha Richter
Germany	NDR (Note: On behalf of the German public broadcasting consortium ARD)	Leon	"Planet of Blue"	German	Hanne Haller; Anna Rubach
Hungary	MTV	Gjon Delhusa	"Fortuna"	Hungarian	Gjon Delhusa
Israel	IBA	Galit Bell	"Shalom Olam" (שלום עולם)	Hebrew	Eyal Madan; Doron Vitenberg
Macedonia	MRT	Kaliopi	"Samo ti" (Само ти)	Macedonian	Kaliopi
Romania	TVR	Monica Anghel and Sincron	"Rugă pentru pacea lumii"	Romanian	Cornel Fugaru; Mirela Voiculescu
Russia	RTR	Andrey Kosinskiy	"Ya eto ya" (Я это я)	Russian	Nikolai Denisov; Andrey Kosinskiy

== Production ==
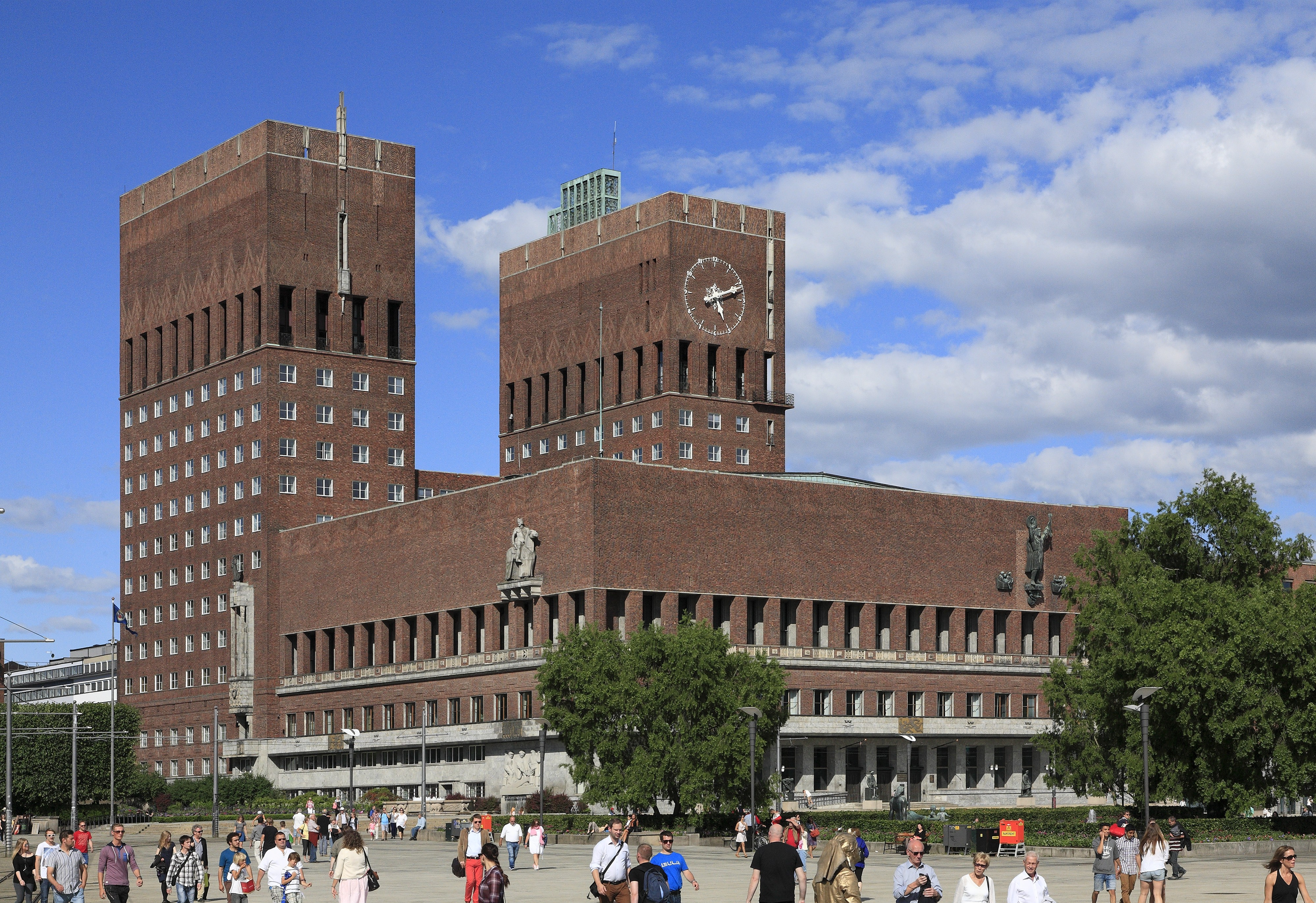
Oslo City Hall, location of the welcome reception

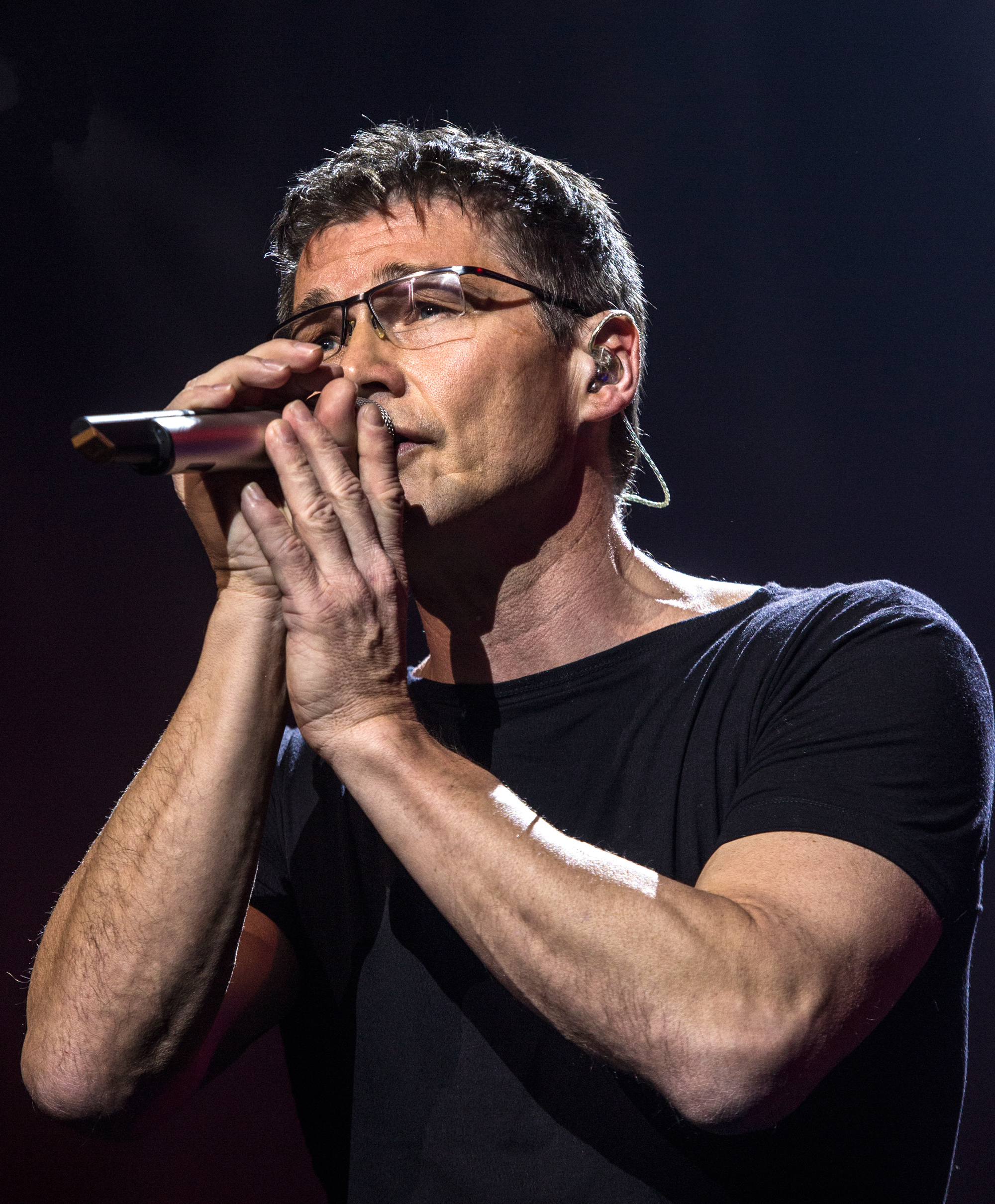
In addition to serving as co-presenter of the 1996 contest, Morten Harket (pictured in 2013) also performed as the show's opening act.

The Eurovision Song Contest 1996 was produced by the Norwegian public broadcaster Norsk rikskringkasting (NRK). Odd Arvid Strømstad served as executive producer, Pål Veiglum served as director, Bjarte Ulfstein served as designer, and Frode Thingnæs served as musical director, leading the Norwegian Radio Orchestra. A separate musical director could be nominated by each participating delegation to lead the orchestra during its country's performance, with the host musical director also available to conduct for those countries which did not nominate their own conductor. On behalf of the European Broadcasting Union (EBU), the event was overseen by Christine Marchal-Ortiz as scrutineer.

The show was presented by the Norwegian journalist and television presenter Ingvild Bryn and the Norwegian singer Morten Harket, lead vocalist of the Norwegian band a-ha. The contest underwent a re-brand for this edition, as NRK set out to improve the image of the competition and broaden its audience appeal. The event was referred to by the hosts and through on-screen captions as Eurosong '96, the only occasion in which this contraction was officially used to refer to the event.

Rehearsals in the contest venue for the competing acts began on 13 May 1996. Each country had two technical rehearsals in the week approaching the contest, with countries rehearsing in the order in which they would perform. The first rehearsals took place on 13 and 14 May, with each country allowed 40 minutes total on stage, followed by 20 minutes to review recordings with producers and to consult on suggested changes, and then a 20-minute press conference. Each country's second rehearsals took place on 15 and 16 May, with 30 minutes total on stage followed by another 20 minute press conference. A full technical rehearsal with all artists took place on the afternoon of 17 May, followed by two dress rehearsals with an audience on the evening of 17 May and the following afternoon. The competing delegations were invited to a welcome reception during the week in the build-up to the event, hosted by the Mayor of Oslo at Oslo City Hall on the evening of 13 May, as well as to events during the rehearsal week including a sailing trip on the Oslofjord and a trip to the Norsk Folkemuseum in Bygdøy where a special Eurovision-themed exhibition had been installed.

NRK introduced visual effects to the contest for the first time. Computer-generated imagery (CGI) was featured as overlays during the broadcast of the competing entries, and the voting segment was conducted via chroma key technology built by Silicon Graphics; during this segment host Ingvild Bryn was situated in the "blue room", a special area to the side of the stage with a blue-coloured background, which allowed the contest scoreboard to be rendered virtually using CGI. The chroma key virtual display also included live footage of the artists in the green room backstage, as well as the video feeds of each country's spokespersons as they delivered their country's points.

== Format ==
Each participating broadcaster submitted one song, which was required to be no longer than three minutes in duration and performed in the language, or one of the languages, of the country which it represented. A maximum of six performers were allowed on stage during each country's performance, and all participants were required to have reached the age of 16 in the year of the contest. Each entry could utilise all or part of the live orchestra and could use instrumental-only backing tracks, however any backing tracks used could only include the sound of instruments featured on stage being mimed by the performers.

For the 1996 contest a trial qualification process replaced the relegation system used from 1993 to 1995, whereby the lowest-ranked countries in each final were eliminated from the following year's contest. Under the new procedure, an audio preselection was organised for all participating countries, apart from the host country Norway, which received an automatic right to compete in the final, to be joined by an additional 22 countries. National juries in all competing countries, including Norway, listened to the submitted entries on audio tape, with juries required to listen to all songs three times before voting. Each of the eight members on each country's jury awarded their favourite song twelve points, their second-favourite ten points, their third-favourite eight points, with subsequent points being awarded consecutively down to each juror's tenth-favourite song being awarded one point, with the points awarded by all jurors being totalled to determine each country's top ten songs which were awarded points in the same manner. Although never officially confirmed, it has been rumoured that this system was introduced in an attempt to appease Germany, one of Eurovision's biggest markets and financial contributors, which would have otherwise been relegated under the previous system.

The EBU required all entries to be submitted by 20 March 1996. Jury voting was held on 20 and 21 March, with the qualifying countries publicly revealed on 22 March as part of the running order draw for the final conducted by Christian Borch. The full results of how individual juries had voted was not intended to be revealed publicly, but the full breakdown has since become available.

=== Voting procedure ===
The results of the 1996 contest were determined using the scoring system introduced in 1975: each country awarded twelve points to its favourite entry, followed by ten points to its second favourite, and then awarded points in decreasing value from eight to one for the remaining songs which featured in the country's top ten, with countries unable to vote for their own entry. The points awarded by each country were determined by an assembled jury of sixteen individuals, which was required to be split evenly between members of the public and music professionals, between men and women, and by age. Each jury member voted in secret and awarded between one and ten votes to each participating song, excluding that from their own country and with no abstentions permitted. The votes of each member were collected following the country's performance and then tallied by the non-voting jury chairperson to determine the points to be awarded. In any cases where two or more songs in the top ten received the same number of votes, a show of hands by all jury members was used to determine the final placing. Individuals who had sat on a jury for the qualifying round were barred from sitting on a jury for the final. This was the last occasion that juries alone decided the result of the contest, as five nations introduced public televoting as a trial in 1997, and almost all other countries followed suit the next year.

=== Postcards ===
The "postcards" were 70-second video introductions shown on television whilst the stage is being prepared for the next contestant to perform their entry; the postcards for each country at the 1996 contest was made up of three segments. In the first segment the participating country was highlighted geographically on a map of Europe, followed by video footage of that country's competing artist or artists in their home country during their day-to-day lives, which also featured each artist packing a branded backpack with important items which they would take with them to Oslo. The second segment featured footage of nature scenes in Norway as well as Norwegian people in everyday life, often accompanied by music from Norwegian electronic group Subgud. The final segment consisted of a pre-recorded good luck message from a governmental representative from each respective country in the language of that country. The seniority of these figures varied between the different countries; among the contributors were then-President of Turkey Süleyman Demirel, who survived an assassination attempt on the day of the contest, and then-Prime Minister of Portugal António Guterres, who would later become the Secretary-General of the United Nations in 2017. The individuals who provided messages for each country are shown below, alongside the position which they held at the time of the contest and the language in which they provided their message.

- Turkey – Süleyman Demirel, President of Turkey (Turkish)
- United Kingdom – Virginia Bottomley, Secretary of State for National Heritage (English)
- Spain – Alberto Escudero Claramunt, Spanish Ambassador to Norway (Spanish)
- Portugal – António Guterres, Prime Minister of Portugal (Portuguese)
- Cyprus – Glafcos Clerides, President of Cyprus (Greek)
- Malta – Edoardo Fenech Adami, Prime Minister of Malta (Maltese)
- Croatia – Zlatko Mateša, Prime Minister of Croatia (Croatian)
- Austria – Elisabeth Gehrer, Federal Minister for Education and Cultural Affairs (German)
- Switzerland – Michel Coquoz, Swiss chargé d'affaires in Norway (French)
- Greece – Caterína Dimaki, Greek chargé d'affaires in Norway (Greek)
- Estonia – Tiit Vähi, Prime Minister of Estonia (Estonian)
- Norway – Gro Harlem Brundtland, Prime Minister of Norway (Norwegian)
- France – Philippe Douste-Blazy, Minister of Culture (French)
- Slovenia – Milan Kučan, President of Slovenia (Slovene)
- Netherlands – Aad Nuis, State Secretary of Education, Culture and Science (Dutch)
- Belgium – Luc Van den Brande, Minister-President of Flanders (Dutch)
- Ireland – John Bruton, Taoiseach (English)
- Finland – Riitta Uosukainen, Speaker of the Parliament of Finland (Finnish)
- Iceland – Davíð Oddsson, Prime Minister of Iceland (Icelandic)
- Poland – Aleksander Kwaśniewski, President of Poland (Polish)
- Bosnia and Herzegovina – Alija Izetbegović, President of the Presidency of Bosnia and Herzegovina (Bosnian)
- Slovakia – Vladimír Mečiar, Prime Minister of Slovakia (Slovak)
- Sweden – Göran Persson, Prime Minister of Sweden (Swedish)

== Contest overview ==
=== Qualifying round ===
The qualifying round took place on 20 and 21 March 1996, and the results were announced on 22 March. The table below outlines the participating countries, the order in which the juries listened to the entries, the competing artists and songs, and the results of the voting. Countries were ordered alphabetically by ISO two-letter country code.

The entries from Denmark, Germany, Hungary, Israel, Macedonia, Romania, and Russia were eliminated following the qualifying round. This marked the first time that Germany was absent from the contest and remains the only occasion to date where the nation has not participated in the contest final. Additionally Macedonia's first attempt to compete in the contest is not considered a debut entry by the EBU, with the nation eventually going on to make its official televised debut in 1998.

Hungary and Finland tied on the same score for the final qualification place, however Finland qualified for the contest due to them having received the highest individual score (8 points) compared to Hungary (7 points).

Results of the qualifying round of the Eurovision Song Contest 1996
R/O	Country	Artist	Song	Points	Place
1	Austria	George Nussbaumer	"Weil's dr guat got"	80	6
2	Bosnia and Herzegovina	Amila Glamočak	"Za našu ljubav"	29	21
3	Belgium	Lisa del Bo	"Liefde is een kaartspel"	45	12
4	Switzerland	Kathy Leander	"Mon cœur l'aime"	67	8
5	Cyprus	Constantinos	"Mono gia mas"	42	15
6	Germany	Leon	"Planet of Blue"	24	24
7	Denmark	Dorthe Andersen and Martin Loft	"Kun med dig"	22	25
8	Estonia	Maarja-Liis Ilus and Ivo Linna	"Kaelakee hääl"	106	5
9	Spain	Antonio Carbonell	"Ay, qué deseo"	43	14
10	Finland	Jasmine	"Niin kaunis on taivas"	26	22
11	France	Dan Ar Braz and l'Héritage des Celtes	"Diwanit bugale"	55	11
12	United Kingdom	Gina G	"Ooh Aah... Just a Little Bit"	153	3
13	Greece	Marianna Efstratiou	"Emis forame to himona anixiatika"	45	12
14	Croatia	Maja Blagdan	"Sveta ljubav"	30	19
15	Hungary	Gjon Delhusa	"Fortuna"	26	22
16	Ireland	Eimear Quinn	"The Voice"	198	2
17	Israel	Galit Bell	"Shalom Olam"	12	28
18	Iceland	Anna Mjöll	"Sjúbídú"	59	10
19	Macedonia	Kaliopi	"Samo ti"	14	26
20	Malta	Miriam Christine	"In a Woman's Heart"	138	4
21	Netherlands	Maxine and Franklin Brown	"De eerste keer"	63	9
22	Poland	Kasia Kowalska	"Chcę znać swój grzech"	42	15
23	Portugal	Lúcia Moniz	"O meu coração não tem cor"	32	18
24	Romania	Monica Anghel and Sincron	"Rugă pentru pacea lumii"	11	29
25	Russia	Andrey Kosinskiy	"Ya eto ya"	14	26
26	Sweden	One More Time	"Den vilda"	227	1
27	Slovenia	Regina	"Dan najlepših sanj"	30	19
28	Slovakia	Marcel Palonder	"Kým nás máš"	38	17
29	Turkey	Şebnem Paker	"Beşinci Mevsim"	69	7

=== Final ===
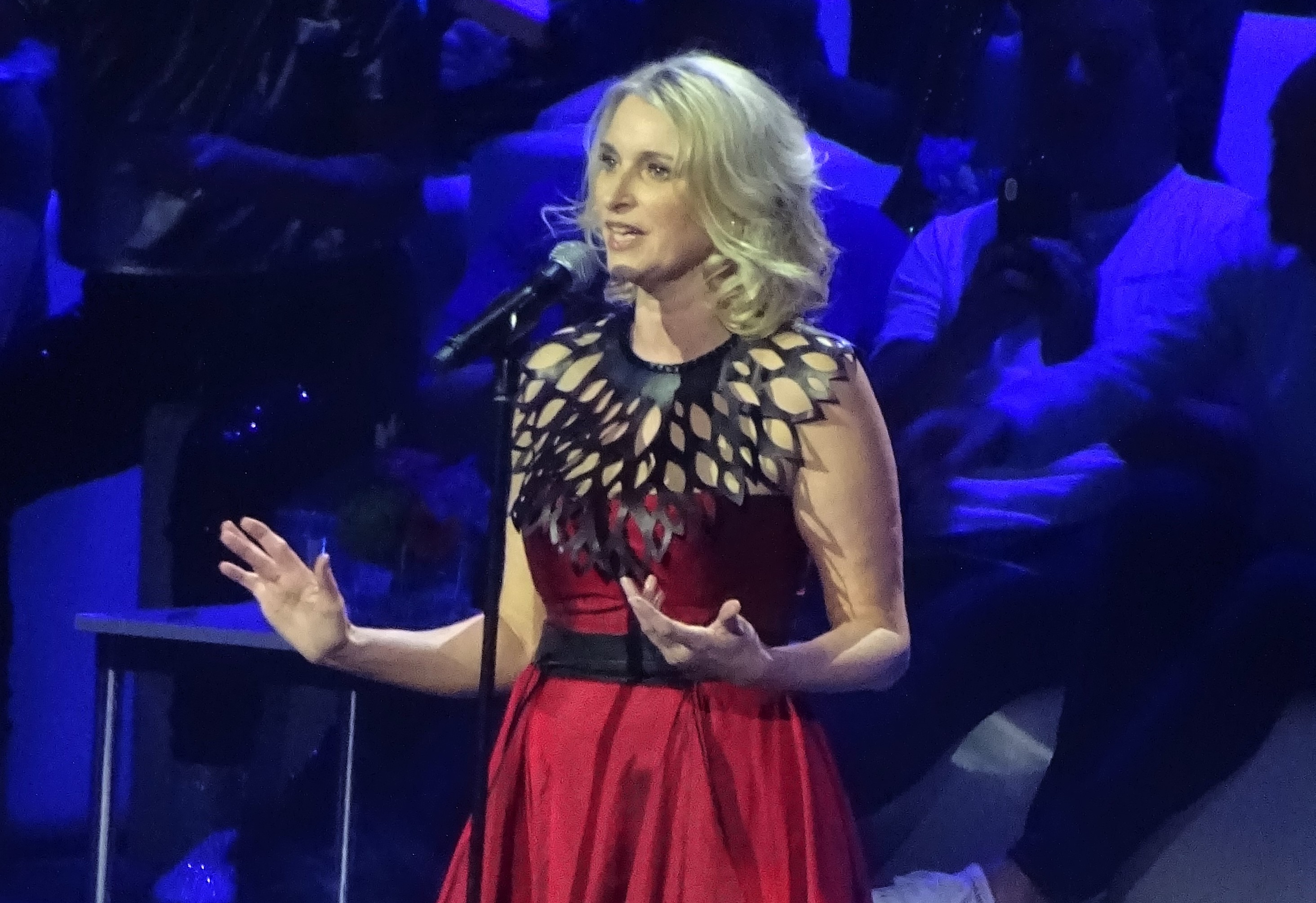
Eimear Quinn, the winning artist of the Eurovision Song Contest 1996

The contest took place on 18 May 1996 at 21:00 (CEST) and lasted 3 hours and 7 minutes. In addition to his role as host, Harket also performed the song "Heaven's Not for Saints" as the show's opening act, and also a smash hit in Norway at the time. The interval act, entitled "Vardebrenning" or "Beacon Burning", was created by Petter Skavlan. The act featured a film montage created by Nils Gaup which combined stev, jazz, and Norwegian folk music as part of a musical tour of Norway, followed by a dance number performed live in the Oslo Spektrum by the Oslo Danse Ensemble, composed by Egil Monn-Iversen and choreographed by Runar Borge. The film section featured performances by Torbjørg Aamlid Paus, Bukkene Bruse, Bendik Hofseth, Håvard Gimse, Helge Kjekshus, the Brazz Brothers, Mari Boine and Terje Rypdal.

The winner was Ireland, represented by the song "The Voice", written by Brendan Graham and performed by Eimear Quinn. This was Ireland's seventh contest win, extending its record achieved in 1994, as well as its fourth contest win in five years following victories in the 1992, 1993 and 1994 contests. Graham recorded his second contest win in three years as a songwriter, having written the winning song of the 1994 contest "Rock 'n' Roll Kids", and thus became one of five individuals to have won the contest more than once as an artist or songwriter up to that point in time, alongside Willy van Hemert, Yves Dessca, Johnny Logan and Rolf Løvland. Croatia, Estonia and Portugal achieved their highest placings to date by finishing fourth, fifth and sixth respectively, while Finland finished in last place for the eighth time.

During the announcement of the Spanish votes, the Spanish spokesperson Belén Fernández de Henestrosa referred to the Netherlands as "Holland", which was misheard by Ingvild Bryn as "Poland" and which resulted in the Spanish six points being incorrectly attributed to the latter country. The results of the contest were amended after the event to correct this error, and the tables in this article present the corrected results as published by the EBU.

Results of the Eurovision Song Contest 1996
R/O	Country	Artist	Song	Points	Place
1	Turkey	Şebnem Paker	"Beşinci Mevsim"	57	12
2	United Kingdom	Gina G	"Ooh Aah... Just a Little Bit"	77	8
3	Spain	Antonio Carbonell	"Ay, qué deseo"	17	20
4	Portugal	Lúcia Moniz	"O meu coração não tem cor"	92	6
5	Cyprus	Constantinos	"Mono gia mas"	72	9
6	Malta	Miriam Christine	"In a Woman's Heart"	68	10
7	Croatia	Maja Blagdan	"Sveta ljubav"	98	4
8	Austria	George Nussbaumer	"Weil's dr guat got"	68	10
9	Switzerland	Kathy Leander	"Mon cœur l'aime"	22	16
10	Greece	Marianna Efstratiou	"Emis forame to himona anixiatika"	36	14
11	Estonia	Maarja-Liis Ilus and Ivo Linna	"Kaelakee hääl"	94	5
12	Norway	Elisabeth Andreassen	"I evighet"	114	2
13	France	Dan Ar Braz and l'Héritage des Celtes	"Diwanit bugale"	18	19
14	Slovenia	Regina	"Dan najlepših sanj"	16	21
15	Netherlands	Maxine and Franklin Brown	"De eerste keer"	78	7
16	Belgium	Lisa del Bo	"Liefde is een kaartspel"	22	16
17	Ireland	Eimear Quinn	"The Voice"	162	1
18	Finland	Jasmine	"Niin kaunis on taivas"	9	23
19	Iceland	Anna Mjöll	"Sjúbídú"	51	13
20	Poland	Kasia Kowalska	"Chcę znać swój grzech"	31	15
21	Bosnia and Herzegovina	Amila Glamočak	"Za našu ljubav"	13	22
22	Slovakia	Marcel Palonder	"Kým nás máš"	19	18
23	Sweden	One More Time	"Den vilda"	100	3

==== Spokespersons ====
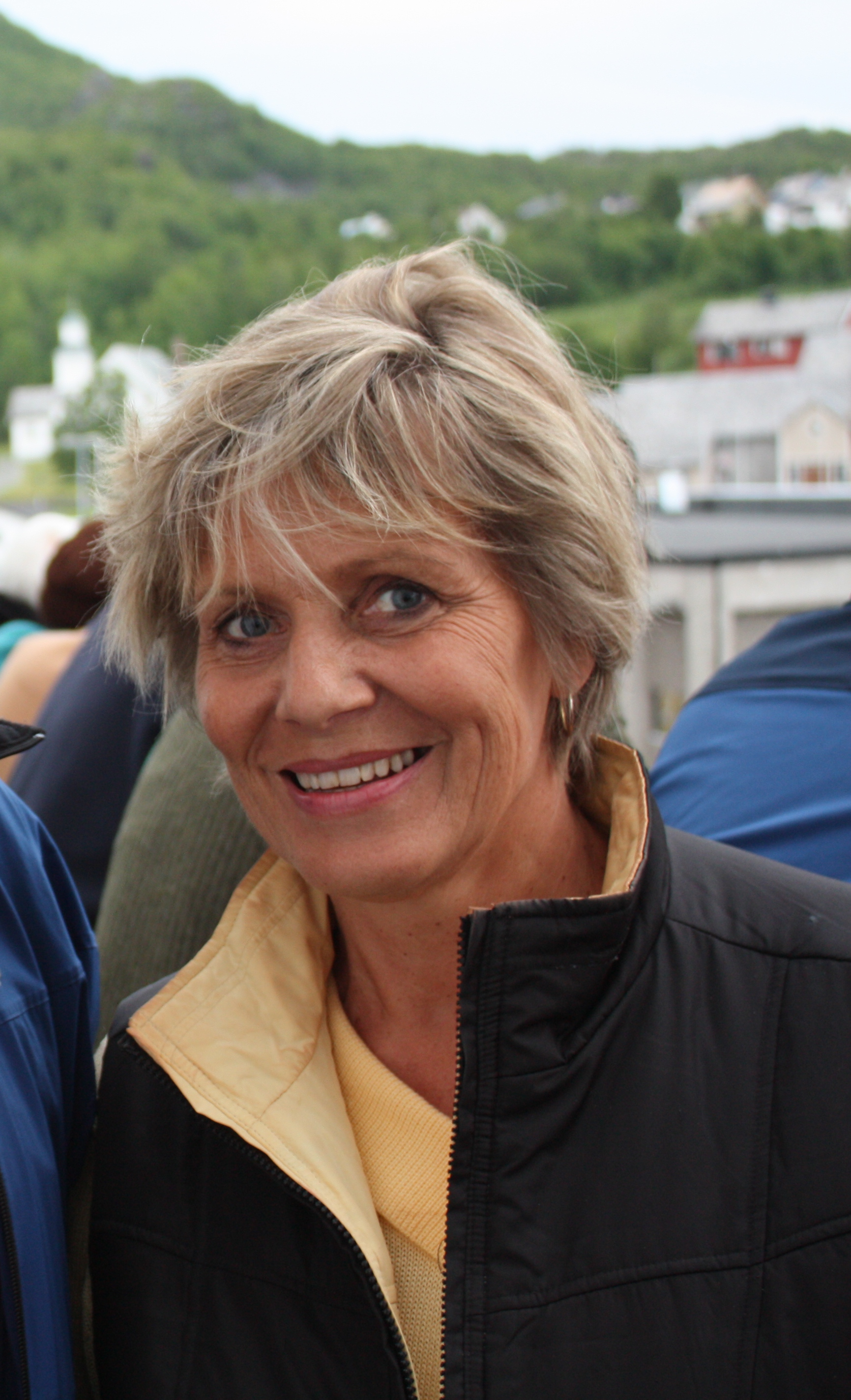
Ragnhild Sælthun Fjørtoft, the Norwegian spokesperson

Each participating broadcaster appointed a spokesperson who was responsible for announcing, in English or French, the votes for its respective country. As had been the case since the 1994 contest, the spokespersons were connected via satellite and appeared in vision during the broadcast, with the exception of the Norwegian spokesperson, Ragnhild Sælthun Fjørtoft, who appeared in person in the Oslo Spektrum. Spokespersons at the 1996 contest are listed below.

1. Turkey – Ömer Önder
2. United Kingdom – Colin Berry
3. Spain – Belén Fernández de Henestrosa
4. Portugal – Cristina Rocha
5. Cyprus – Marios Skordis
6. Malta – Ruth Amaira
7. Croatia – Daniela Trbović
8. Austria – Martina Rupp
9. Switzerland – Yves Ménestrier
10. Greece – Niki Venega
11. Estonia – Annika Talvik
12. Norway – Ragnhild Sælthun Fjørtoft
13. France – Laurent Broomhead
14. Slovenia – Mario Galunič
15. Netherlands – Marcha
16. Belgium – An Ploegaerts
17. Ireland – Eileen Dunne
18. Finland – Solveig Herlin
19. Iceland – Svanhildur Konráðsdóttir
20. Poland – Jan Chojnacki
21. Bosnia and Herzegovina – Segmedina Srna
22. Slovakia – Alena Heribanová
23. Sweden – Ulla Rundqvist

== Detailed voting results ==
Jury voting was used to determine the points awarded by all countries. The announcement of the results from each country was conducted in the order in which they performed, with the spokespersons announcing their country's points in English or French in ascending order. The detailed breakdown of the points awarded by each country is listed in the tables below.

=== Qualifying round ===
Detailed voting results in the qualifying round
		Total score	Austria	Bosnia and Herzegovina	Belgium	Switzerland	Cyprus	Germany	Denmark	Estonia	Spain	Finland	France	United Kingdom	Greece	Croatia	Hungary	Ireland	Israel	Iceland	Macedonia	Malta	Netherlands	Norway	Poland	Portugal	Romania	Russia	Sweden	Slovenia	Slovakia	Turkey
Contestants	Austria	**80**		6	1		6	1	2		5	2	**12**		6		3			10		**12**		5	2					7		
Contestants	Bosnia and Herzegovina	**29**				2		3			3	1				6						2								**12**		
Contestants	Belgium	**45**									8	4		7				4	6					2	4	6	2					2
Contestants	Switzerland	**67**	3	3	3			7		5								7			8		5	6	3	7			4			6
Contestants	Cyprus	**42**									4			2	**12**		5				5	4						4			6	
Contestants	Germany	24							5				5	10					3										1			
Contestants	Denmark	22		4			3										1	2			2			1			4		5			
Contestants	Estonia	**106**	5		5	4		8	8			8	1				6			5	1		10	10	5	5	3	**12**	7	3		
Contestants	Spain	**43**	2				4								4	8						8					1			4	8	4
Contestants	Finland	**26**				6									8				5	7												
Contestants	France	**55**							6	8		3						5		6	10				6	4					4	3
Contestants	United Kingdom	**153**	10		7		10	5	7	2		7	10			1	7	8	**12**			3	7	8	1	10	8		**12**	1	5	**12**
Contestants	Greece	**45**					**12**				7					7			2			5						5			7	
Contestants	Croatia	**30**	1	7				2			1										3	1						1	8	6		
Contestants	Hungary	26		1			2		1	6					2	3							3				7				1	
Contestants	Ireland	**198**	**12**	**12**	8	7	8		3	10	2	10	8	**12**	10		2		10	**12**	6		6		10	3		7	10	10	10	10
Contestants	Israel	12											3								4											5
Contestants	Iceland	**59**		5						7		5	6						7					**12**			6	8			3	
Contestants	Macedonia	14														2	4			2			1							5		
Contestants	Malta	**138**	6		10	8	7	6		1	**12**		4		7	10	8	6						4	7	2	**12**	3	6		**12**	7
Contestants	Netherlands	**63**			4	3			10				2				**12**	3		3	7					**12**	5		2			
Contestants	Poland	**42**	7					10		3				1	1								8					10			2	
Contestants	Portugal	**32**	4		6									6	5				1				4	3						2		1
Contestants	Romania	11						4										1				6										
Contestants	Russia	14				5				4				5																		
Contestants	Sweden	**227**	8	10	**12**	**12**	1	**12**	**12**	**12**		**12**	7	8			10	**12**	8	8	**12**		**12**	7	**12**	8	10	6		8		8
Contestants	Slovenia	**30**			2	1			4					3		5		10		1			2					2				
Contestants	Slovakia	**38**		2			5				6				3	**12**						10										
Contestants	Turkey	**69**		8		10					10	6		4		4			4	4		7			8	1			3			

==== 12 points ====
The below table summarises how the maximum 12 points were awarded from one country to another in the qualifying round.

Distribution of 12 points awarded at the qualifying round
N.	Contestant	Nation(s) giving 12 points
10	Sweden	Belgium, Denmark, Estonia, Finland, Germany, Ireland, Macedonia, Netherlands, Poland, Switzerland
4	Ireland	Austria, Bosnia and Herzegovina, Iceland, United Kingdom
3	Malta	Romania, Slovakia, Spain
3	United Kingdom	Israel, Sweden, Turkey
2	Austria	France, Malta
2	Netherlands	Hungary, Portugal
1	Bosnia and Herzegovina	Slovenia
1	Cyprus	Greece
1	Estonia	Russia
1	Greece	Cyprus
1	Iceland	Norway
1	Slovakia	Croatia

=== Final ===
Detailed voting results in the final
		Total score	Turkey	United Kingdom	Spain	Portugal	Cyprus	Malta	Croatia	Austria	Switzerland	Greece	Estonia	Norway	France	Slovenia	Netherlands	Belgium	Ireland	Finland	Iceland	Poland	Bosnia and Herzegovina	Slovakia	Sweden
Contestants	Turkey	57		6	8			10	1		6				4		7	5		5			5		
Contestants	United Kingdom	77	3			**12**	1	6	7	3	4		2		8			**12**	3		4			6	6
Contestants	Spain	17					2	5	4			6													
Contestants	Portugal	92	5	2			**12**		10	1	10	5		**12**	5		6	6		3	10		1		4
Contestants	Cyprus	72		**12**	7	3		2	8	2	5	**12**			2				1	6				10	2
Contestants	Malta	68	10		10				**12**			8		1		4						6		**12**	5
Contestants	Croatia	98	8	4	5	10	8	7			1	1	6	7		3	5	4	6		5	2	10	5	1
Contestants	Austria	68	4			5		**12**				2	7		**12**	1			8			8	6	3	
Contestants	Switzerland	22		3												2	4	2	4	4	3				
Contestants	Greece	36		7			10	1			2			3			1					1		8	3
Contestants	Estonia	94		10	4		7			5				8	1	8	3		2	**12**	**12**	10			**12**
Contestants	Norway	114	2	8		2	3		5	8	7		5		7	10	10	8	7	7	8	4	3		10
Contestants	France	18		1		1							3	4				7		2					
Contestants	Slovenia	16			1				6												1		8		
Contestants	Netherlands	78	1		6	7	5			**12**	3		4		10	5		1	5		2	7	2		8
Contestants	Belgium	22		5	**12**				2				1				2								
Contestants	Ireland	**162**	**12**			8	6	4		7	**12**	10	**12**	10	6	**12**	**12**	3		10		**12**	**12**	7	7
Contestants	Finland	9												2							7				
Contestants	Iceland	51			3	6				6		3	8	5		6			10			3		1	
Contestants	Poland	31	7				4			4		7											7	2	
Contestants	Bosnia and Herzegovina	13	6					3	3											1					
Contestants	Slovakia	19			2			8				4										5			
Contestants	Sweden	100				4				10	8		10	6	3	7	8	10	**12**	8	6		4	4	

==== 12 points ====
The below table summarises how the maximum 12 points were awarded from one country to another in the final. The winning country is shown in bold.

Distribution of 12 points awarded at the final
N.	Contestant	Nation(s) giving 12 points
7	**Ireland**	Bosnia and Herzegovina, Estonia, Netherlands, Poland, Slovenia, Switzerland, Turkey
3	Estonia	Finland, Iceland, Sweden
2	Austria	France, Malta
2	Cyprus	Greece, United Kingdom
2	Malta	Croatia, Slovakia
2	Portugal	Cyprus, Norway
2	United Kingdom	Belgium, Portugal
1	Belgium	Spain
1	Netherlands	Austria
1	Sweden	Ireland

== Broadcasts ==
Each participating broadcaster was required to relay the contest via its networks. Non-participating EBU member broadcasters were also able to relay the contest as "passive participants". Broadcasters were able to send commentators to provide coverage of the contest in their own native language and to relay information about the artists and songs to their television viewers. These commentators were typically sent to the venue to report on the event, and were able to provide commentary from small booths constructed at the back of the venue. Known details on the broadcasts in each country, including the specific broadcasting stations and commentators are shown in the tables below.

Broadcasters and commentators in participating countries
Country	Broadcaster	Channel(s)	Commentator(s)	Ref.
Austria	ORF	ORF 1	Ernst Grissemann	
Austria	ORF	FM4	Stermann & Grissemann	
Belgium	BRTN	TV1	Michel Follet and Johan Verstreken	
Belgium	BRTN	Radio 2	Guy De Pré and Bart Pieters	
Belgium	RTBF	RTBF1	Jean-Pierre Hautier and Sandra Kim	
Croatia	HRT	HRT1	Aleksandar Kostadinov	
Cyprus	CyBC	RIK 1	Evi Papamichail	
Estonia	ETV			
Finland	YLE	TV1	Erkki Pohjanheimo, Sanna Kojo and Minna Pentti	
Finland	YLE	Radio Suomi	Iris Mattila and Pasi Hiihtola	
France	France Télévision	France 2	Olivier Minne	
Iceland	RÚV	Sjónvarpið, Rás 2	Jakob Frímann Magnússon	
Ireland	RTÉ	RTÉ One	Pat Kenny	
Ireland	RTÉ	RTÉ Radio 1	Larry Gogan	
Malta	PBS	TVM	Charles Saliba	
Netherlands	NOS	TV2	Willem van Beusekom	
Netherlands	NCRV	Radio 2	Hijlco Span	
Norway	NRK	NRK Fjernsynet	Jostein Pedersen	
Norway	NRK	NRK P1	Stein Dag Jensen and Anita Skorgan	
Poland	TVP	TVP1	Dorota Osman	
Poland	PR	Polskie Radio Bis	Artur Orzech and Dariusz Michalski	
Portugal	RTP	RTP1 (Note: Additional live broadcast on RTP Internacional)		
Slovakia	STV	STV2		
Slovenia	RTVSLO	SLO 1	Miša Molk	
Slovenia	RTVSLO	Val 202		
Spain	TVE	La Primera	José Luis Uribarri	
Sweden	SVT	SVT2	Björn Kjellman	
Sweden	SR	SR P3	Claes-Johan Larsson and Lisa Syrén	
Switzerland	SRG SSR	Schweiz 4	Sandra Studer	
Switzerland	SRG SSR	TSR	Pierre Grandjean	
Switzerland	Radio Z			
Turkey	TRT	TRT 1		
United Kingdom	BBC	BBC1 (Note: Additional live broadcast on BBC Prime)	Terry Wogan	
United Kingdom	BBC	BBC Radio 2	Ken Bruce	

Broadcasters and commentators in non-participating countries
Country	Broadcaster	Channel(s)	Commentator(s)	Ref.
Australia	SBS	SBS TV (Note: Deferred broadcast the following day at 20:00 (AEST))		
Denmark	DR	DR TV	Jørgen de Mylius	
Denmark	DR	DR P3	Katrine Nyland Sørensen, Martin Loft and Marianne Dinesen	
Faroe Islands	SvF			
Germany	MDR	MDR Fernsehen (Note: The contest was broadcast live on select Third Program channels of Germany's ARD, with a deferred broadcast on Das Erste at 00:35 (CEST).)	Ulf Ansorge	
Germany	NDR/RB	N3	Ulf Ansorge	
Germany	SFB	B1	Ulf Ansorge	
Germany	WDR	WDR Fernsehen	Ulf Ansorge	
Greenland	KNR	KNR (Note: Deferred broadcast at 21:45 (WGST))	Jørgen de Mylius	
Hungary	MTV	MTV 2	István Vágó	
Israel	IBA	Channel 1		
Jordan	JRTV	JTV2		
Lithuania	LRT	LTV		
Romania	TVR	TVR 1	Doina Caramzulescu and Costin Grigore	
Yugoslavia	RTS	RTS 2		

== Notes and references ==
=== Bibliography ===
- Hatlestad, Silje Marie (June 2011). Good evening Europe, this is Norway: ei innhaldsanalyse av dei tre internasjonale Eurovision Song Contestfinalane arrangert i Noreg [Good evening Europe, this is Norway: a content analysis of the three international Eurovision Song Contest finals held in Norway] (PDF) (Masters thesis) (in Norwegian Nynorsk). Bergen, Norway: University of Bergen. Archived from the original (PDF) on 8 October 2022.
- Murtomäki, Asko (2007). Finland 12 points! Suomen Euroviisut (in Finnish). Helsinki, Finland: Teos. ISBN 978-951-851-106-2.
- O'Connor, John Kennedy (2010). The Eurovision Song Contest: The Official History (2nd ed.). London: Carlton Books. ISBN 978-1-84732-521-1.
- Roxburgh, Gordon (2020). Songs for Europe: The United Kingdom at the Eurovision Song Contest. Vol. Four: The 1990s. Prestatyn, United Kingdom: Telos Publishing. ISBN 978-1-84583-163-9.
- Thorsson, Leif; Verhage, Martin (2006). Melodifestivalen genom tiderna: de svenska uttagningarna och internationella finalerna [Melodifestivalen through the ages: the Swedish selections and international finals] (in Swedish). Stockholm, Sweden: Premium Publishing. ISBN 91-89136-29-2.
- Vuletic, Dean (2018). Postwar Europe and the Eurovision Song Contest. London, United Kingdom: Bloomsbury Academic. ISBN 978-1-4742-7626-9.
