= Odd Arvid Strømstad =

Norwegian television director and producer

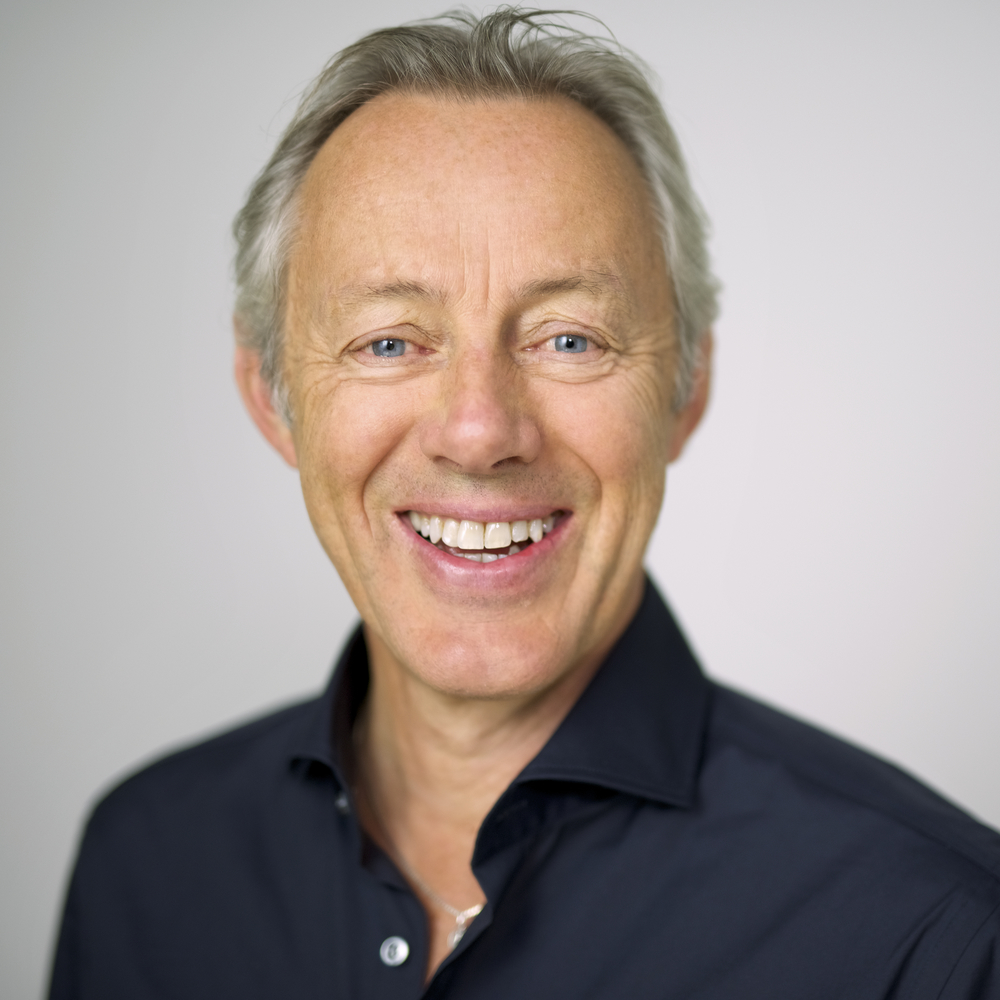
- Born: 27 July 1952

Odd Arvid Strømstad (born 27 July 1952) is a Norwegian television director and producer, and managing director of Dinamo Story.

Based in Oslo Norway, Stromstad has developed and produced TV series and specials for more than 20 years. He has been awarded three Amanda awards and two Gullruten awards. His productions include Nobel Peace Prize Concert (1994–), an annual event with international distribution; "Closest Thing To Crazy" (2006), a concert with Katie Melua at the bottom of the North Sea titled "Deepest Concert Ever"; "Football for Africa" (2006) charity concert at the National Football Stadium in Senegal; Spellemannprisen (2002–2007); and the 1996 Eurovision Song Contest.
