= Croatia in the Eurovision Song Contest 1996 =

- Eurovision Song Contest 1996
- Participating broadcaster: Croatian Radiotelevision (HRT)
- Country: Croatia
- Selection process: Dora 1996
- Selection date: 3 March 1996

Competing entry
- Song: "Sveta ljubav"
- Artist: Maja Blagdan
- Songwriter: Zrinko Tutić

Placement
- Final result: 4th, 98 points

Participation chronology

Croatia was represented at the Eurovision Song Contest 1996 with the song "Sveta ljubav", written by Zrinko Tutić, and performed by Maja Blagdan. The Croatian participating broadcaster, Croatian Radiotelevision (HRT), selected its entry through Dora 1996.

== Before Eurovision ==
=== Dora 1996 ===
Croatian Radiotelevision (HRT) organised Dora 1996 to select its entry in the Eurovision Song Contest 1996. The national selection, held on 3 March 1996 in Opatija, consisted of a televised final with 20 songs selected from a public call for submissions from songwriters and composers. The winner was chosen by 20 regional juries.

Final – 3 March 1996
R/O	Artist	Song	Points	Place
1	Alen Vitasović	"Marija"	18	13
2	Erwin	"Uvijek ti"	16	14
3	Novi fosili	"Spray"	76	6
4	Leo	"Postojiš samo ti"	11	15
5	Srebrna krila	"Divno je znati da netko te voli"	52	9
6	Juci	"Moja posljednja molitva"	4	19
7	Marinella and Tutti Frutti	"Sjeti se"	137	3
8	Massimo	"Kao more"	33	12
9	Branimir Mihaljević	"Zbog ljubavi"	39	11
10	Giuliano	"Sjaj u očima otkriva te"	104	5
11	Ivana Banfić and Rene Cooler	"Dani ludila"	1	20
12	Renata Kos	"O mama, mama"	10	17
13	Maja Blagdan	"Sveta ljubav"	214	1
14	Divas	"Sexy Cool"	50	10
15	Jelena	"Aha"	156	2
16	Naim Ayra	"Dvije ruže"	10	17
17	Ivan Mikulić	"Budi ona prava"	55	8
18	Zrinka	"Tako sam ranjiva"	106	4
19	Petar Grašo	"Otkada nije mi tu"	57	7
20	Sandra Sagena	"Ne želim biti dama"	11	15

Detailed Regional Jury Votes
R/O	Song	Bjelovar	Dubrovnik	Gospić	Knin	Krapina	Metković	Okučani	Osijek	Pazin	Petrinja	Pula	Rijeka	Slavonski Brod	Split	Šibenik	Varaždin	Vinkovci	Zadar	Zagreb	Županja	Total
1	"Marija"									7		4	3		1	3						18
2	"Uvijek ti"					8			4			1	1				2					16
3	"Spray"	5	1	4	1	5	1	3	6		1	10	5	7	5	6	6			4	6	76
4	"Postojiš"		2				3										4				2	11
5	"Divno je znati da netko te voli"		3	7				4		3	6	5		4	7		8			2	3	52
6	"Moja posljednja molitva"					4																4
7	"Sjeti se"	6	12	5	7	1	8	10	5	10	7	12	6	5	6	7	3	10	3	7	7	137
8	"Kao more"		4		2						2				3				12	6	4	33
9	"Zbog ljubavi"			3		7			2	1				2				8	8		8	39
10	"Sjaj u očima otkriva te"	7	8	10	6	2	7	7	1		4	6		6	10	12	1	4	5	3	5	104
11	"Dani ludila"																			1		1
12	"O mama, mama"							1		2						1		6				10
13	"Sveta ljubav"	12	10	12	10	10	12	8	10	12	12	8	12	12	12	10	10	12	6	12	12	214
14	"Sexy Cool"		5		4		4		3		5		4			8		5	2	10		50
15	"Aha"	10	7	6	12	12	5	12	7	8	10	3	10	8	4	5	12	7	10	8		156
16	"Dvije ruže"	2											8									10
17	"Budi ona prava"	3		1	3		10	2	8	5			2	3		4	5	2	7			55
18	"Tako sam ranjiva"	4	6	8	8	6	6	5		4	8		7	10	8	2	7	1	1	5	10	106
19	"Otkada nije mi tu"	8		2		3		6	12	6	3	7		1	2			3	4			57
20	"Ne želim biti dama"	1			5		2					2									1	11

== At Eurovision ==
In 1996, for the only time in Eurovision history, an audio-only qualifying round of the 29 songs entered (excluding hosts Norway who were exempt) was held in March in order for the seven lowest-scoring songs to be eliminated before the final. "Sveta ljubav" received 30 points, placing 19th and thus qualifying for the final.

On the night of the contest Maja Blagdan performed 7th, following Malta and preceding the Austria. The song received 98 points at the close of the voting, placing 4th of 23 countries competing. This was Croatia's joint-best placing at the contest, shared with the Croatian entry in 1999, "Marija Magdalena" by Doris Dragović, until 2024 when Baby Lasagna finished in 2nd place with Rim Tim Tagi Dim.

=== Voting ===
==== Qualifying round ====
Points awarded to Croatia (qualifying round)
Score	Country
12 points	
10 points	
8 points	Sweden
7 points	Bosnia and Herzegovina
6 points	Slovenia
5 points	
4 points	
3 points	Macedonia
2 points	Germany
1 point	Austria; Malta; Russia; Spain

Points awarded by Croatia (qualifying round)
Score	Country
12 points	Slovakia
10 points	Malta
8 points	Spain
7 points	Greece
6 points	Bosnia and Herzegovina
5 points	Slovenia
4 points	Turkey
3 points	Hungary
2 points	Macedonia
1 point	United Kingdom

==== Final ====
Points awarded to Croatia (final)
Score	Country
12 points	
10 points	Bosnia and Herzegovina; Portugal
8 points	Cyprus; Turkey
7 points	Malta; Norway
6 points	Estonia; Ireland
5 points	Iceland; Netherlands; Slovakia; Spain
4 points	Belgium; United Kingdom
3 points	Slovenia
2 points	Poland
1 point	Greece; Sweden; Switzerland

Points awarded by Croatia (final)
Score	Country
12 points	Malta
10 points	Portugal
8 points	Cyprus
7 points	United Kingdom
6 points	Slovenia
5 points	Norway
4 points	Spain
3 points	Bosnia and Herzegovina
2 points	Belgium
1 point	Turkey
