= Portugal in the Eurovision Song Contest 1996 =

- Eurovision Song Contest 1996
- Participating broadcaster: Radiotelevisão Portuguesa (RTP)
- Country: Portugal
- Selection process: Festival RTP da Canção 1996
- Selection date: 7 March 1996

Competing entry
- Song: "O meu coração não tem cor"
- Artist: Lúcia Moniz
- Songwriters: Pedro Osório; José Fanha

Placement
- Final result: 6th, 92 points

Participation chronology

Portugal was represented at the Eurovision Song Contest 1996 with the song "O meu coração não tem cor" composed by Pedro Osório, with lyrics by José Fanha, and performed by Lúcia Moniz. The Portuguese participating broadcaster, Radiotelevisão Portuguesa (RTP), organised the national final Festival RTP da Canção 1996 in order to select its entry for the contest. The competition took place on 7 March 1996 where "O meu coração não tem cor" performed by Lúcia Moniz emerged as the winner following the votes from ten regional juries.

The song competed in the Eurovision Song Contest which took place on 18 May 1996. Performing during the show in position 4, it placed sixth out of the 23 participating songs from different countries, scoring 92 points.

== Background ==
Prior to the 1996 contest, Radiotelevisão Portuguesa (RTP) had participated in the Eurovision Song Contest representing Portugal thirty-one times since its first entry in 1964. Its highest placing in the contest was seventh, which they achieved on two occasions: in 1972 with the song "A festa da vida" performed by Carlos Mendes and in 1980 with the song "Um grande, grande amor" performed by José Cid. Its least successful result has been last place, which they have achieved on two occasions, most recently in 1974 with the song "E depois do adeus" performed by Paulo de Carvalho. The Portuguese entry has also received nul points once, in 1964 with the song "Oração" performed by António Calvário.

RTP has traditionally selected its entry for the Eurovision Song Contest via the music competition Festival da Canção, with an exception in 1988 when it selected its entry internally. The broadcaster organized Festival RTP da Canção 1996 in order to select the 1996 Portuguese entry.

== Before Eurovision ==
=== Festival RTP da Canção 1996 ===
Festival RTP da Canção 1996 was the 33rd edition of Festival da Canção that selected the Portuguese entry for the Eurovision Song Contest 1996. Ten entries, created by composers invited by RTP for the competition, competed in the final which took place at the Teatro Politeama in Lisbon on 7 March 1996, hosted by Carlos Cruz and Isabel Angelino and broadcast on RTP1 and RTP Internacional at 20:30 (WET). The winner, "O meu coração não tem cor" performed by Lúcia Moniz, was selected based on the votes of ten regional juries. In addition to the performances of the competing entries, among the artists which performed as the interval act included Portuguese Eurovision 1993 entrant Anabela.

Final – 7 March 1996
R/O	Artist	Song	Songwriter(s)	Conductor	Points	Place
1	Vânia Maroti	"Start Stop"	Pedro Abrantes, Fernando Abrantes, Maria João Abrantes	Carlos Alberto Moniz	33	10
2	Tó Leal	"Eu mesmo"	Paco Bandeira, Francisco Rodrigues	José Marinho	42	8
3	Patrícia Antunes	"Canto em português"	João Mota Oliveira, Rosa Lobato de Faria	Carlos Alberto Moniz	91	2
4	Barbara Reis	"A minha ilha"	Luís Filipe, Johnny Galvão	Johnny Galvão	43	7
5	Elaisa	"Ai, a noite"	Dina, Rosa Lobato de Faria	Carlos Alberto Moniz	49	6
6	Somseis	"A canção da paz"	Thilo Krasmann, Rosa Lobato de Faria	Thilo Krasmann	76	3
7	Cristina Castro Pereira	"Ganhámos o céu"	José Cid	Mike Sergeant	63	4
8	Lúcia Moniz	"O meu coração não tem cor"	Pedro Osório, José Fanha	Pedro Osório	95	1
9	Pedro Miguéis	"Prazer em conhecer"	Jan van Dijck, Francisco Rodrigues	Ramón Galarza	54	5
10	João Portugal	"Top Model"	Nuno Nazareth Fernandes	Thilo Krasmann	34	9

Detailed Regional Jury Votes
R/O	Song	Coimbra	Évora	Faro	Funchal	Lisbon	Ponta Delgada	Porto	Viana do Castelo	Vila Real	Viseu	Total
1	"Start Stop"	1	3	1	1	2	2	3	10	5	5	33
2	"Eu mesmo"	3	10	6	2	6	4	4	2	2	3	42
3	"Canto em português"	5	12	10	7	7	8	10	12	10	10	91
4	"A minha ilha"	12	1	4	10	1	3	2	5	1	4	43
5	"Ai, a noite"	6	4	5	4	5	6	8	6	4	1	49
6	"A canção da paz"	8	5	8	12	10	10	7	8	6	2	76
7	"Ganhámos o céu"	4	6	7	6	8	7	5	1	7	12	63
8	"O meu coração não tem cor"	10	8	12	3	12	12	12	7	12	7	95
9	"Prazer em conhecer"	7	7	3	8	4	5	6	3	3	8	54
10	"Top Model"	2	2	2	5	3	1	1	4	8	6	34

== At Eurovision ==
In 1996, all nations with the exceptions of the host country were required to qualify from an audio qualifying round, held on 20 and 21 March 1996, in order to compete for the Eurovision Song Contest; the top twenty-two countries from the qualifying round progress to the contest. During the allocation draw which determined the running order of the final on 22 March 1996, Portugal was announced as having finished in the top 22 and subsequently qualifying for the contest. It was later revealed that Portugal placed eighteenth in the qualifying round, receiving a total of 32 points. Following the draw, Portugal was set to perform in position 4, following the entry from Spain and before the entry from Cyprus. The Portuguese conductor at the contest was the co-composer of "O meu coração não tem cor" Pedro Osório, and Portugal finished in sixth place with 92 points. This was Portugal's best placing at the contest in its history until Salvador Sobral's victory 21 years later.

In Portugal, the show was broadcast on RTP1 and RTP Internacional. The Portuguese spokesperson, who announced the scores awarded by the Portuguese jury, was Cristina Rocha.

=== Voting ===
Below is a breakdown of points awarded to Portugal and awarded by Portugal in the qualifying round and the contest. The nation awarded its 12 points to the Netherlands in the qualifying round and to the United Kingdom in the contest.

==== Qualifying round ====
Points awarded to Portugal (qualifying round)
Score	Country
12 points	
10 points	
8 points	
7 points	
6 points	Belgium; United Kingdom
5 points	Greece
4 points	Austria; Netherlands
3 points	Norway
2 points	Slovenia
1 point	Israel; Turkey

Points awarded by Portugal (qualifying round)
Score	Country
12 points	Netherlands
10 points	United Kingdom
8 points	Sweden
7 points	Switzerland
6 points	Belgium
5 points	Estonia
4 points	France
3 points	Ireland
2 points	Malta
1 point	Turkey

==== Final ====
Points awarded to Portugal (final)
Score	Country
12 points	Cyprus; Norway
10 points	Croatia; Iceland; Switzerland
8 points	
7 points	
6 points	Belgium; Netherlands
5 points	France; Greece; Turkey
4 points	Sweden
3 points	Finland
2 points	United Kingdom
1 point	Austria; Bosnia and Herzegovina

Points awarded by Portugal (final)
Score	Country
12 points	United Kingdom
10 points	Croatia
8 points	Ireland
7 points	Netherlands
6 points	Iceland
5 points	Austria
4 points	Sweden
3 points	Cyprus
2 points	Norway
1 point	France
