= Cyprus in the Eurovision Song Contest 1996 =

- Eurovision Song Contest 1996
- Participating broadcaster: Cyprus Broadcasting Corporation (CyBC)
- Country: Cyprus
- Selection process: Epilogí Kypriakís Symmetochís Sti Giourovízion
- Selection date: 5 March 1996

Competing entry
- Song: "Mono gia mas"
- Artist: Constantinos
- Songwriters: Andreas Giorgallis; Rodoula Papalambrianou

Placement
- Final result: 9th, 72 points

Participation chronology

Cyprus was represented at the Eurovision Song Contest 1996 with the song "Mono gia mas" (Μόνο για μας), composed by Andreas Giorgallis, with lyrics by Rodoula Papalambrianou, and performed by Constantinos. The Cypriot participating broadcaster, the Cyprus Broadcasting Corporation (CyBC), selected its entry through a national final.

== Before Eurovision ==
=== Epilogí Kypriakís Symmetochís Sti Giourovízion ===
==== Competing entries ====
The Cyprus Broadcasting Corporation (CyBC) opened a submission period for Cypriot artists and composers to submit songs until 12 January 1996. The deadline was later postponed to 21 January 1996. By the end of the submission period, 43 entries had been submitted. On 4 February 1996, in radio room one of the CyBC studios, an 8-member jury listened to the received submissions and chose eight songs to compete in the national final.

==== Final ====
The final was broadcast live at 21:10 (EET) on RIK 1 on 5 March 1996 in a show titled Epilogí Kypriakís Symmetochís Sti Giourovízion (Greek: Επιλογή Κυπριακής Συμμετοχής Στη Γιουροβίζιον). The contest was held at the Monte Caputo Nightclub in Limassol, and was hosted by Marina Maleni. The winner was decided by a 20-member jury who each gave out 10 points to their favourite song, 8 to their second favourite, and 6 through to 1 points for their third to eighth placing songs.

Final - 5 March 1996
R/O	Artist	Song	Songwriter(s)	Points	Place
1	Katerina Chartosia	"Kai se roto" (Και σε ρωτώ)	Katerina Logothetis-Chartosia	78	5
2	Michalis Hatzigiannis	"Trello paidi" (Τρελλό παιδί)	Andros Papapavlou, Leonidas Malenis	139	2
3	Sofi Christofidou	"Antecho" (Αντέχω)	Koralia Schiza, Ilias Antoniadis	109	4
4	Anastasios	"Epi gis eirini" (Επί γης ειρήνη)	Charis Anastasios	72	6
5	Katerina Chartosia	"Erota mou" (Ερωτά μου)	Theos Kallias, Giorgos Karavokyris	111	3
6	Kyros Lontos	"Chilies seirines" (Χίλιες σειρήνες)	Kyros Lontos	54	8
7	Constantinos	"Mono gia mas" (Μόνο για μας)	Andreas Giorgallis, Rodoula Papalambrianou	162	1
8	Giorgos Kalopedis	"Kravgi" (Κραυγή)	Loukas Christou, Antis Oskis	55	7

Detailed Jury Votes
R/O	Song	Jury																				Total
R/O	Song	1	2	3	4	5	6	7	8	9	10	11	12	13	14	15	16	17	18	19	20	Total
1	"Kai se roto"	10	5	2	4	3	8	6	6	1	1	6	3	3	1	5	2	3	1	4	4	78
2	"Trello paidi"	4	6	4	5	8	10	10	8	6	3	10	8	8	10	4	5	5	5	10	10	139
3	"Antecho"	8	4	8	8	4	5	5	5	5	8	5	6	4	2	3	8	4	6	3	8	109
4	"Epi gis eirini"	2	3	3	1	6	3	2	3	2	2	1	10	5	4	8	6	6	2	2	1	72
5	"Erota mou"	5	8	6	6	5	4	3	4	8	10	3	1	6	5	6	4	8	8	5	6	111
6	"Chilies seirines"	1	1	1	2	1	2	4	2	3	6	4	4	2	8	2	1	2	4	1	3	54
7	"Mono gia mas"	6	10	5	10	10	6	8	10	10	5	8	5	10	6	10	10	10	10	8	5	162
8	"Kravgi"	3	2	10	3	2	1	1	1	4	4	2	2	1	3	1	3	1	3	6	2	55

== At Eurovision ==
In 1996, for the only time in Eurovision history, an audio-only pre-qualifying round of the 29 songs entered (excluding hosts Norway who were exempt) was held in March in order for the seven lowest-scoring songs to be eliminated before the final. Cyprus received 42 points, placing joint 15th and thus qualifying for the final in Oslo.

On the night of the final, Constantinos Christoforou (performing mononymously as Constantinos) performed fifth in the running order, following Portugal and preceding Malta. At the closing of the voting, "Mono gia mas" had received 72 points, placing Cyprus 9th out of 23 competing countries. The Cypriot jury awarded its 12 points to Portugal.

=== Voting ===
==== Qualifying round ====
Points awarded to Cyprus (qualifying round)
Score	Country
12 points	Greece
10 points	
8 points	
7 points	
6 points	Slovakia
5 points	Hungary; Macedonia
4 points	Malta; Russia; Spain
3 points	
2 points	United Kingdom
1 point	

Points awarded by Cyprus (qualifying round)
Score	Country
12 points	Greece
10 points	United Kingdom
8 points	Ireland
7 points	Malta
6 points	Austria
5 points	Slovakia
4 points	Spain
3 points	Denmark
2 points	Hungary
1 point	Sweden

==== Final ====
Points awarded to Cyprus (final)
Score	Country
12 points	Greece; United Kingdom
10 points	Slovakia
8 points	Croatia
7 points	Spain
6 points	Finland
5 points	Switzerland
4 points	
3 points	Portugal
2 points	Austria; France; Malta; Sweden
1 point	Ireland

Points awarded by Cyprus (final)
Score	Country
12 points	Portugal
10 points	Greece
8 points	Croatia
7 points	Estonia
6 points	Ireland
5 points	Netherlands
4 points	Poland
3 points	Norway
2 points	Spain
1 point	United Kingdom
