= United Kingdom in the Eurovision Song Contest 1996 =

- Eurovision Song Contest 1996
- Participating broadcaster: British Broadcasting Corporation (BBC)
- Country: United Kingdom
- Selection process: The Great British Song Contest 1996
- Selection date: 8 March 1996

Competing entry
- Song: "Ooh Aah... Just a Little Bit"
- Artist: Gina G
- Songwriters: Simon Tauber; Steve Rodway

Placement
- Final result: 8th, 77 points

Participation chronology

The United Kingdom was represented at the Eurovision Song Contest 1996 with the song "Ooh Aah... Just a Little Bit", composed by Steve Rodway, with lyrics by Simon Tauber, and performed by Gina G. The British participating broadcaster, the British Broadcasting Corporation (BBC), selected its entry through a national final.

== Before Eurovision ==
=== The Great British Song Contest 1996 ===
The British Broadcasting Corporation (BBC) developed The Great British Song Contest 1996 in order to select its entry for the Eurovision Song Contest 1996. Eight acts competed in the competition which consisted of a semi-final on 1 March 1996 and a televised final on 8 March 1996. Both semi-final and final were broadcast on BBC1.

==== Semi-final ====
The qualifying round for the contest (the first since 1960's selection), a special edition of Top of the Pops, was broadcast on BBC1 on 1 March 1996 and hosted by Nicky Campbell. It was announced that the four songs with the highest number of telephone votes would qualify for the final. A recap of the songs were also featured during the following morning's edition of Live & Kicking with voting lines reopened for a short time. The top four songs were announced later that evening during The National Lottery Live and went forward to the final on 8 March.

Semi-final – 1 March 1996
R/O	Artist	Song	Songwriter(s)	Result
1	Layla	"Find Love"	Marcus Vere, Simon Wilkinson	Qualified
2	Code Red	"I Gave You Everything"	Deni Lew, Nicky Graham, Wayne Hector	Qualified
3	Esseness	"I Never Knew"	Stuart Elliot, Rick Driscoll, Mike Connaris	—N/a
4	Dan Anderson	"Sometimes It Rains"	Louisa Scott, Ronnie James Scott	—N/a
5	Lois	"I Just Want To Make Love 2 U"	Ben Keen, Paul Thompson, Mike Connaris	—N/a
6	Twin Hazey	"Louise"	Keith Summers, David Whitehouse, Michael Flaherty	—N/a
7	Zeitia Massiah	"A Little Love"	Pam Sheyne, Eliot Kennedy	Qualified
8	Gina G	"Ooh Aah... Just a Little Bit"	Steve Rodway, Simon Tauber	Qualified

==== Final ====
The BBC held the final on 8 March 1996 at BBC Television Centre in London. Hosted by Terry Wogan, it was broadcast on BBC1 at 20:00. For the first time since 1985, there was no simultaneous broadcast with BBC Radio 2. The winning entry was announced at the end of the show following a further public phone vote. The guest performers were Irish boy band Boyzone who performed their version of Cat Stevens' "Father and Son", and actress Nicola Hughes who performed "The Acid Queen" from the rock musical The Who's Tommy.

Final – 8 March 1996
R/O	Artist	Song	Televote	Place
1	Zeitia Massiah	"A Little Love"	41,105	3
2	Code Red	"I Gave You Everything"	41,791	2
3	Gina G	"Ooh Aah... Just a Little Bit"	113,576	1
4	Layla	"Find Love"	2,578	4

== At Eurovision ==
With the exception of host nation Norway, who were exempted, all 29 countries wishing to participate in the 1996 contest had to go through an audio-only pre-qualifying round held on 20 March. The lowest-placed seven songs would be eliminated and would not appear in Oslo. Gina G was placed 3rd with 153 points, thus qualifying for the final.

On the night of the final Gina G performed 2nd in the running order, following Turkey and preceding Spain. At the end of the voting it had received 77 points, placing 8th out of 23 contestants. The United Kingdom jury awarded its 12 points to Cyprus.

Despite this result, 'Just a Little Bit' is one of the most successful of the UK's entries at Eurovision, not only topping the UK singles chart but also finding success in America, where the song was nominated for the Grammy Award for Best Dance Recording in 1998.

=== Voting ===
==== Qualifying round ====
Points awarded to the United Kingdom (qualifying round)
Score	Country
12 points	Israel; Sweden; Turkey
10 points	Austria; Cyprus; France; Portugal
8 points	Ireland; Norway; Romania
7 points	Belgium; Denmark; Finland; Hungary; Netherlands
6 points	
5 points	Germany; Slovakia
4 points	
3 points	Malta
2 points	Estonia
1 point	Croatia; Poland; Slovenia

Points awarded by the United Kingdom (qualifying round)
Score	Country
12 points	Ireland
10 points	Germany
8 points	Sweden
7 points	Belgium
6 points	Portugal
5 points	Russia
4 points	Turkey
3 points	Slovenia
2 points	Cyprus
1 point	Poland

==== Final ====
Points awarded to the United Kingdom (final)
Score	Country
12 points	Belgium; Portugal
10 points	
8 points	France
7 points	Croatia
6 points	Malta; Slovakia; Sweden
5 points	
4 points	Iceland; Switzerland
3 points	Austria; Ireland; Turkey
2 points	Estonia
1 point	Cyprus

Points awarded by the United Kingdom (final)
Score	Country
12 points	Cyprus
10 points	Estonia
8 points	Norway
7 points	Greece
6 points	Turkey
5 points	Belgium
4 points	Croatia
3 points	Switzerland
2 points	Portugal
1 point	France
