= Slovenia in the Eurovision Song Contest 1996 =

- Eurovision Song Contest 1996
- Participating broadcaster: Radiotelevizija Slovenija (RTVSLO)
- Country: Slovenia
- Selection process: Slovenska Popevka za Evrovizijo '96
- Selection date: 10 February 1996

Competing entry
- Song: "Dan najlepših sanj"
- Artist: Regina
- Songwriter: Aleksander Kogoj

Placement
- Final result: 21st, 16 points

Participation chronology

Slovenia was represented at the Eurovision Song Contest 1996 with the song "Dan najlepših sanj", written by Aleksander Kogoj, and performed by Regina. The Slovene participating broadcaster, Radiotelevizija Slovenija (RTVSLO), held a national final in order to select its entry for the contest.

== Before Eurovision ==
=== Slovenska Popevka za Evrovizijo '96 ===
Radiotelevizija Slovenija (RTVSLO) held a national final to select its entry for the Eurovision Song Contest 1996. The competing entries were selected from sixty submissions by a five-member jury. Among the rejected entries was "Ti nisi sam" by Faraoni.

The national final was held on 10 February 1996 at 20:05 CET, and was named "Slovenska Popevka za Evrovizijo '96" in TV guides and the show's title card. The contest was hosted by Tajda Lekše. Darja Švajger performed her 1995 entry "Prisluhni mi" as an interval act. The results of the national final were decided by juries in twelve regional radio stations.

The national final is known to have been broadcast live on television on TV SLO 1, and on radio on Radio Val 202, and then repeated on 12 February 1996 at 12:40 CET on TV SLO 2.

Following the national final, complaints were raised by some of the participants as Tajda Lekše said during the broadcast that the radio juries did not know how the other radio juries had voted, yet after Radio Slovenija had announced their votes, their spokesperson Jolanda Fele prematurely congratulated Regina on her win. Jolanda Fele and Mojca Mavec, a representative of RTVSLO's entertainment department, released a statement that the juries were allowed to form their votes and then monitor the broadcast, and that no voting irregularities occurred.

Final – 10 February 1996
R/O	Artist	Song	Songwriter(s)		Points	Place
R/O	Artist	Song	Composer(s)	Lyricist	Points	Place
1	Vili Resnik	"Nekdo, ki zmore vse"	Primož Peterca		56	5
2	Irena Vrčkovnik	"Naj mesec ugasne"	Matjaž Vlašič	Urša Vlašič	104	2
3	Panda	"Sama proti vsem"	Andrej Pompe	Suzana Jeklic	65	4
4	Roberto	"Nisi, nisva"	Elvis Dobrilovič, Roberto	Miša Čermak	3	11
5	Alenka Vidrih and Miha Vardjan	"Moja sreča, to si ti"	Miha Vardjan		25	8
6	Don Juan	"Ena, dva, tri"	Miran Fakin	Vili Bertok	36	7
7	Irena Vidic	"To je bil le dotik"	Blaž Jurjevčič	Milan Dekleva	9	10
8	Marta Zore	"Pojdi z njo"	Marta Zore	Miša Čermak	74	3
9	Pop Design	"Volk samotar"	Matjaž Vlašič	Tone Košmrlj	48	6
10	Regina	"Dan najlepših sanj"	Aleksander Kogoj		118	1
11	Ansambel Janeza Novaka	"Kako ti je ime?"	Tomaž Snoj	Tadej Vasle	22	9

Detailed Radio Votes
R/O	Song	Radio Ognjišče	Radio Šmarje pri Jelšah	Radio Ptuj	Koroški Radio	Radio Kranj	Studio D	Radio Trbovlje	Radio Celje	Radio Murski val	Radio Koper	Radio Maribor	Radio Slovenija	Total
1	"Nekdo, ki zmore vse"	6	10	10	2	3	6	8	2	1	3	3	2	56
2	"Naj mesec ugasne"	10	8	6	10	4	12	12	10	8	6	10	8	104
3	"Sama proti vsem"	2	3	1	4	10	1	4	8	6	12	2	12	65
4	"Nisi, nisva"		1								2			3
5	"Moja sreča, to si ti"	3	2		3		4	1	1	3	4		4	25
6	"Ena, dva, tri"	1		12		8		6	6	2		1		36
7	"To je bil le dotik"				6								3	9
8	"Pojdi z njo"	4	12	3	8	1	8	2	4	10	10	6	6	74
9	"Volk samotar"	8	6	8	1	6	2	3		4	1	8	1	48
10	"Dan najlepših sanj"	12	4	4	12	12	10	10	12	12	8	12	10	118
11	"Kako ti je ime?"			2		2	3		3			4		22

== At Eurovision ==
=== Voting ===
==== Qualifying round ====
Points awarded to Slovenia (qualifying round)
Score	Country
12 points	
10 points	Ireland
8 points	
7 points	
6 points	
5 points	Croatia
4 points	Denmark
3 points	United Kingdom
2 points	Belgium; Netherlands; Russia
1 point	Iceland; Switzerland

Points awarded by Slovenia (qualifying round)
Score	Country
12 points	Bosnia and Herzegovina
10 points	Ireland
8 points	Sweden
7 points	Austria
6 points	Croatia
5 points	Macedonia
4 points	Spain
3 points	Estonia
2 points	Portugal
1 point	United Kingdom

==== Final ====
Points awarded to Slovenia (final)
Score	Country
12 points	
10 points	
8 points	Bosnia and Herzegovina
7 points	
6 points	Croatia
5 points	
4 points	
3 points	
2 points	
1 point	Iceland; Spain

Points awarded by Slovenia (final)
Score	Country
12 points	Ireland
10 points	Norway
8 points	Estonia
7 points	Sweden
6 points	Iceland
5 points	Netherlands
4 points	Malta
3 points	Croatia
2 points	Switzerland
1 point	Austria
