= Sweden in the Eurovision Song Contest 1996 =

- Eurovision Song Contest 1996
- Participating broadcaster: Sveriges Television (SVT)
- Country: Sweden
- Selection process: Melodifestivalen 1996
- Selection date: 24 February 1996

Competing entry
- Song: "Den vilda"
- Artist: One More Time
- Songwriters: Peter Grönvall; Nanne Grönvall

Placement
- Final result: 3rd, 100 points

Participation chronology

Sweden was represented at the Eurovision Song Contest 1996 with the song "Den vilda", composed by Peter Grönvall, with lyrics by Nanne Grönvall, and performed by the band One More Time. The Swedish participating broadcaster, Sveriges Television (SVT), selected its entry through Melodifestivalen 1996.

At the contest, held in Oslo, Norway, One More Time performed last of 23, following Slovakia. At the close of the voting it had received 100 points, placing 3rd behind winner Ireland and runner-up Norway.

== Before Eurovision ==
=== Melodifestivalen 1996 ===
Melodifestivalen 1996 was the selection for the 36th song to represent Sweden at the Eurovision Song Contest. It was the 35th time that this system of picking a song had been used. 1,323 songs were submitted to Sveriges Television (SVT) for the competition. The final was held in the Victoriahallen in Stockholm on 24 February 1996, presented by Pontus Gårdinger and Siw Malmkvist and was broadcast on SVT1 and Sveriges Radio's P3 and P4 networks. The show was watched by 3,775,000 people. 10 songs competed in total; after these 10 songs were whittled down to 5, 11 regional juries gave points to decide the winner. The winner was "Den vilda", performed by One More Time. The song was written by group members Peter and Nanne Grönvall.

First Round – 24 February 1996
R/O	Artist	Song	Songwriter(s)	Result
1	Peter Lundblad Lasse Kronér, Nick Borgen, Janne Bark and Lennart Grahn	"Gör någon glad"	Svante Persson, Pontus Platin	—N/a
2	Andreas Lundstedt	"Driver dagg faller regn"	Alexander Bard, Ola Håkansson, Tim Norell	Advanced
3	Lotta Engberg	"Juliette & Jonathan"	Monica Forsberg, Torgny Söderberg	Advanced
4	One More Time	"Den vilda"	Nanne Grönvall, Peter Grönvall	Advanced
5	Ellinor Franzén	"Finns här för dig"	Stefan Bagge, Martin Klaman	—N/a
6	Inger Nordström	"Gråt inte"	Rose-Marie Stråhle	—N/a
7	Henrik Åberg	"Du är alltid en del utav mej"	Lasse Berghagen, Lasse Holm	—N/a
8	Frank Ådahl	"Tårar från himlen"	Mikael Littvold, Peter Bertilsson	Advanced
9	Lotten Andersson and Magnus Sjögren	"Va' e' du?"	Jörgen Nohall, Carl Hammar	—N/a
10	Mårten Eriksson	"Förlorad igen"	Mårten Eriksson	Advanced

Second Round – 24 February 1996
R/O	Artist	Song	Points	Place
1	Andreas Lundstedt	"Driver dagg faller regn"	48	2
2	Lotta Engberg	"Juliette & Jonathan"	45	3
3	One More Time	"Den vilda"	71	1
4	Frank Ådahl	"Tårar från himlen"	26	5
5	Mårten Eriksson	"Förlorad igen"	41	4

Detailed Regional Jury Voting
R/O	Song	Luleå	Umeå	Sundsvall	Falun	Örebro	Karlstad	Gothenburg	Malmö	Växjö	Norrköping	Stockholm	Total
1	"Driver dagg faller regn"	6	4	4	6	4	2	4	2	6	2	8	48
2	"Juliette och Jonathan"	8	6	2	4	1	4	2	8	2	4	4	45
3	"Den vilda"	2	8	8	8	8	8	6	1	8	8	6	71
4	"Tårar från himlen"	4	1	1	1	6	1	1	4	4	1	2	26
5	"Förlorad igen"	1	2	6	2	2	6	8	6	1	6	1	41

== At Eurovision ==
In 1996, for the only time in Eurovision history, an audio-only qualifying round of the 29 songs entered (excluding hosts Norway who were exempt) was held in March in order for the seven lowest-scoring songs to be eliminated before the final. Sweden received 227 points, winning the qualifying round and thus qualifying for the final.

On the night of the final, One More Time performed last of 23, following Slovakia. At the close of the voting it had received 100 points, placing 3rd behind winner Ireland and runner-up Norway.

=== Voting ===
==== Qualifying round ====
Points awarded to Sweden (qualifying round)
Score	Country
12 points	Belgium; Denmark; Estonia; Finland; Germany; Ireland; Macedonia; Netherlands; Poland; Switzerland
10 points	Bosnia and Herzegovina; Hungary; Romania
8 points	Austria; Iceland; Israel; Portugal; Slovenia; Turkey; United Kingdom
7 points	France; Norway
6 points	Russia
5 points	
4 points	
3 points	
2 points	
1 point	Cyprus

Points awarded by Sweden (qualifying round)
Score	Country
12 points	United Kingdom
10 points	Ireland
8 points	Croatia
7 points	Estonia
6 points	Malta
5 points	Denmark
4 points	Switzerland
3 points	Turkey
2 points	Netherlands
1 point	Germany

==== Final ====
Points awarded to Sweden (final)
Score	Country
12 points	Ireland
10 points	Austria; Belgium; Estonia
8 points	Finland; Netherlands; Switzerland
7 points	Slovenia
6 points	Iceland; Norway
5 points	
4 points	Bosnia and Herzegovina; Portugal; Slovakia
3 points	France
2 points	
1 point	

Points awarded by Sweden (final)
Score	Country
12 points	Estonia
10 points	Norway
8 points	Netherlands
7 points	Ireland
6 points	United Kingdom
5 points	Malta
4 points	Portugal
3 points	Greece
2 points	Cyprus
1 point	Croatia
