= Estonia in the Eurovision Song Contest 1996 =

- Eurovision Song Contest 1996
- Participating broadcaster: Eesti Televisioon (ETV)
- Country: Estonia
- Selection process: Eurolaul '96
- Selection date: 27 January 1996

Competing entry
- Song: "Kaelakee hääl"
- Artist: Maarja-Liis Ilus and Ivo Linna
- Songwriters: Priit Pajusaar; Kaari Sillamaa

Placement
- Final result: 5th, 94 points

Participation chronology

Estonia was represented at the Eurovision Song Contest 1996 with the song "Kaelakee hääl", composed by Priit Pajusaar, with lyrics by Kaari Sillamaa, and performed by Maarja-Liis Ilus and Ivo Linna. The Estonian participating broadcaster, Eesti Televisioon (ETV), organised the national final Eurolaul '96 in order to select its entry for the contest. Thirteen songs competed in the national final and "Kaelakee hääl" performed by Maarja-Liis Ilus and Ivo Linna was selected as the winner by a jury panel.

Estonia was announced among the top 22 entries of the qualifying round on 20 and 21 March 1996 and therefore qualified to compete in the final which took place on 18 May 1996. It was later revealed that Estonia placed fifth out of the 29 participating countries in the qualifying round with 106 points. Performing during the competition in position 11, Estonia placed fifth out of the 23 participating countries, scoring 94 points.

== Background ==
Prior to the 1996 Contest, Eesti Televisioon (ETV) had participated in the Eurovision Song Contest representing Estonia only once, in 1994 where it placed twenty-fourth with the song "Nagu merelaine" performed by Silvi Vrait. ETV had previously attempted to participate in 1993 but failed to qualify from the qualification round.

As part of its duties as participating broadcaster, ETV organises the selection of its entry in the Eurovision Song Contest and broadcasts the event in the country. Since its debut, the broadcaster has organised national finals that feature a competition among multiple artists and songs in order to select its entry for the contest. The broadcaster announced the organisation of Eurolaul '96 in order to select its 1996 entry.

== Before Eurovision ==
=== Eurolaul '96 ===
Eurolaul '96 was the third edition of the national selection Eurolaul organised by ETV to select its entry for the Eurovision Song Contest 1996. The competition consisted of a thirteen-song final on 27 January 1996 at the Dekoltee nightclub in Tallinn, hosted by Marko Reikop and Karmel Eikner and broadcast on ETV.

==== Competing entries ====
On 9 October 1995, ETV opened a submission period for artists and composers to submit their entries up until 15 November 1995. 18 submissions were received by the deadline and a seven-member jury panel selected thirteen finalists from the submissions. Evelin Samuel and Pearu Paulus have both competed in previous editions of Eurolaul.

Artist	Song	Songwriter(s)
Evelin Samuel and Toomas Rull	"Kaheksa näoga kuu"	Tiit Kikas
Evelin Samuel, Karl Madis, Maarja-Liis Ilus and Pearu Paulus	"Kummalisel teel"	Kaari Sillamaa, Heini Vaikmaa
Hedvig Hanson and Pearu Paulus	"Meeletu algus"	Kaari Sillamaa, Pearu Paulus, Ilmar Laisaar, Alar Kotkas
Ivo Linna and Kadi-Signe Selde	"Lihtne viis"	Leelo Tungal, Gunnar Kriik
Kadri Hunt	"Me rõõm ei kao"	Kadri Hunt
Kirile Loo	"Maatütre tants"	Rein Rannap
Maarja-Liis Ilus and Ivo Linna	"Kaelakee hääl"	Kaari Sillamaa, Priit Pajusaar
Reet Kromel and Arne Lauri	"Laule ja palveid täis päev"	Arne Lauri, Margus Alviste
Sirje Medell	"Elust enesest"	Marika Viires, Kalmet Rauna
Tõnis Mägi	"Ballaad"	Villu Kangur, Tõnis Mägi
Tõnis Mägi	"Eestimaa euromehe laul"	Alo Mattiisen
Üllar Meriste	"Iialgi veel"	Maris Arukask
Urmas Podnek	"Vaba kui tuul"	Leelo Tungal, Peeter Thomson

==== Final ====
The final took place on 27 January 1996. Thirteen songs competed during the show and a jury selected "Kaelakee hääl" performed Maarja-Liis Ilus and Ivo Linna as the winner. Maarja-Liis Ilus and Ivo Linna tied first with Kadri Hunt on 62 points, however, after a review of the scoring Ilus and Linna were declared the winners since they had received one top vote of 10 points, whereas Hunt hadn't received any. The jury panel that voted in the final consisted of Jos Moons (Belgian musician and music teacher), Julian Vignoles (Irish music editor), Kato Hansen (OGAE Norway president), Dušan Popovič (Radio Slovenia music director), Antero Päiväläinen (Finnish producer), Kenris MacLeod (BBC music editor), Bent-Erik Rasmussen (Danish radio producer), Kemal Tursan (UNESCO and International Federation of Festival Organisations member from Turkey) and Lora Kvint (Russian composer).

All thirteen competing songs were performed in playback, with some participants not even being present at the venue and instead appeared on a video wall screen. Kirile Loo didn't appear at all due to illness so there were simply many shots of the stage during her song.

Final – 27 January 1996
R/O	Artist	Song	Jury Votes									Total	Place
R/O	Artist	Song	J. Moons	J. Vignoles	K. Hansen	D. Popovič	A. Päiväläinen	K. MacLeod	B. Rasmussen	K. Tursan	L. Kvint	Total	Place
1	Evelin Samuel and Toomas Rull	"Kaheksa näoga kuu"	7	6	7	5	3	9	6	5	6	54	5
2	Kadri Hunt	"Me rõõm ei kao"	9	8	3	9	9	4	8	4	8	62	2
3	Üllar Meriste	"Iialgi veel"	3	5	4	4	3	2	3	7	6	37	13
4	Hedvig Hanson and Pearu Paulus	"Meeletu algus"	6	4	2	10	8	5	2	6	7	50	7
5	Urmas Podnek	"Vaba kui tuul"	5	4	3	3	6	5	2	6	7	41	10
6	Evelin Samuel, Karl Madis, Maarja-Liis Ilus and Pearu Paulus	"Kummalisel teel"	6	6	5	2	5	7	5	6	9	51	6
7	Ivo Linna and Kadi-Signe Selde	"Lihtne viis"	5	4	8	1	3	6	1	6	6	40	12
8	Reet Kromel and Arne Lauri	"Laule ja palveid täis päev"	4	5	6	2	3	7	5	9	9	50	7
9	Tõnis Mägi	"Ballaad"	6	5	10	5	4	6	7	5	9	57	3
10	Kirile Loo	"Maatütre tants"	8	7	4	1	2	10	6	8	10	56	4
11	Sirje Medell	"Elust enesest"	7	4	6	6	7	1	4	6	7	48	9
12	Maarja-Liis Ilus and Ivo Linna	"Kaelakee hääl"	8	5	7	8	10	3	5	7	9	62	1
13	Tõnis Mägi	"Eestimaa euromehe laul"	2	4	6	4	2	2	5	6	10	41	10

== At Eurovision ==
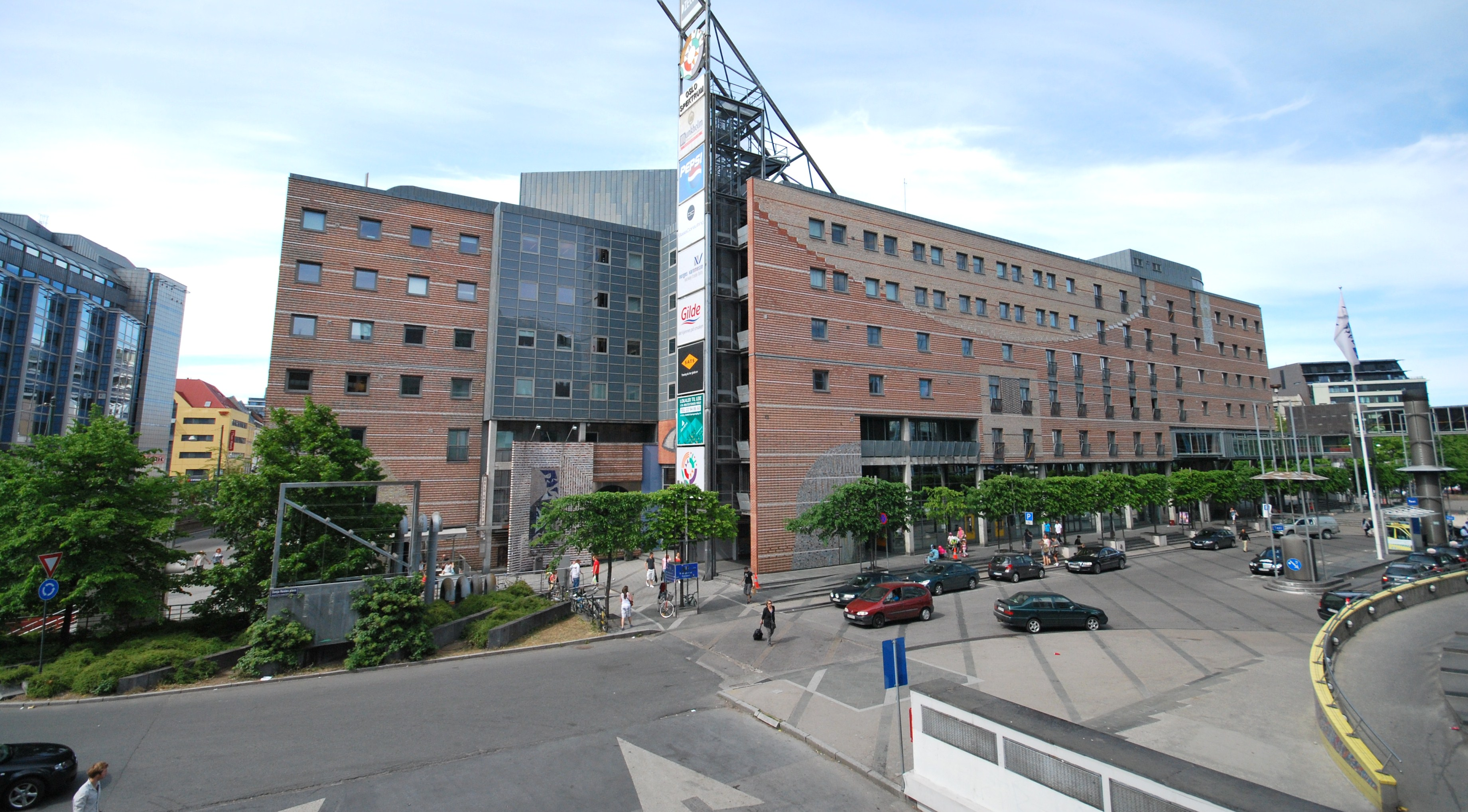
The Eurovision Song Contest 1996 took place at the Oslo Spektrum in Oslo, Norway, on 18 May 1996.

The Eurovision Song Contest 1996 took place at the Oslo Spektrum in Oslo, Norway, on 18 May 1996. According to the Eurovision rules, all nations with the exceptions of the host country were required to qualify from an audio qualifying round, held on 20 and 21 March 1996, in order to compete for the Eurovision Song Contest; the top twenty-two countries from the qualifying round progress to the contest. During the allocation draw which determined the running order of the final on 22 March 1996, Estonia was announced as having finished in the top 22 and subsequently qualifying for the contest. It was later revealed that Estonia placed fifth in the qualifying round, receiving a total of 106 points. Following the draw, Estonia was set to perform in position 11, following the entry from Greece and before the entry from Norway. The Estonian conductor at the contest was Tarmo Leinatamm, and Estonia finished in fifth place with 94 points.

ETV appointed Annika Talvik as its spokesperson to announce the votes awarded by the Estonian jury during the show. ETV's broadcast of the contest was watched by over 350,000 viewers in Estonia with a market share of over 60%.

=== Voting ===
Below is a breakdown of points awarded to Estonia and awarded by Estonia in the contest. The nation awarded its 12 points to Sweden in the qualifying round and to Ireland in the final.

==== Qualifying round ====
Points awarded to Estonia (qualifying round)
Score	Country
12 points	Russia
10 points	Netherlands; Norway
8 points	Denmark; Finland; Germany
7 points	Sweden
6 points	Hungary
5 points	Austria; Belgium; Iceland; Poland; Portugal
4 points	Switzerland
3 points	Romania; Slovenia
2 points	
1 point	France; Macedonia

Points awarded by Estonia (qualifying round)
Score	Country
12 points	Sweden
10 points	Ireland
8 points	France
7 points	Iceland
6 points	Hungary
5 points	Switzerland
4 points	Russia
3 points	Poland
2 points	United Kingdom
1 point	Malta

==== Final ====
Points awarded to Estonia (final)
Score	Country
12 points	Finland; Iceland; Sweden
10 points	Poland; United Kingdom
8 points	Norway; Slovenia
7 points	Cyprus
6 points	
5 points	Austria
4 points	Spain
3 points	Netherlands
2 points	Ireland
1 point	France

Points awarded by Estonia (final)
Score	Country
12 points	Ireland
10 points	Sweden
8 points	Iceland
7 points	Austria
6 points	Croatia
5 points	Norway
4 points	Netherlands
3 points	France
2 points	United Kingdom
1 point	Belgium
