= Netherlands in the Eurovision Song Contest 1996 =

- Eurovision Song Contest 1996
- Participating broadcaster: Nederlandse Omroep Stichting (NOS)
- Country: Netherlands
- Selection process: Nationaal Songfestival 1996
- Selection date: 3 March 1996

Competing entry
- Song: "De eerste keer"
- Artist: Maxine and Franklin Brown
- Songwriters: Piet Souer; Peter van Asten

Placement
- Final result: 7th, 78 points

Participation chronology

The Netherlands was represented at the Eurovision Song Contest 1996 with the song "De eerste keer", written by Piet Souer and Peter van Asten, and performed by Maxine and Franklin Brown. The Dutch participating broadcaster, Nederlandse Omroep Stichting (NOS), selected its entry for the contest through Nationaal Songfestival 1996. NOS returned to the contest after a one-year absence following their relegation in 1995 as one of the bottom six entrants in 1994.

Five acts competed in the national final which consisted of six shows: five semi-finals and a final. Five entries qualified from to compete in the final on 3 March 1996 where "De eerste keer" performed by Maxine and Franklin Brown was selected as the winner following the votes from 13 regional juries.

The Netherlands was announced among the top 22 entries of the qualifying round on 20 and 21 March 1996 and therefore qualified to compete in the final which took place on 18 May 1996. It was later revealed that the Netherlands placed ninth out of the 29 participating countries in the qualifying round with 63 points. Performing during the competition in position 15, the Netherlands placed seventh out of the 23 participating countries, scoring 78 points.

== Background ==
Prior to the 1996 contest, Nederlandse Televisie Stichting (NTS) until 1969, and Nederlandse Omroep Stichting (NOS) since 1970, had participated in the Eurovision Song Contest representing the Netherlands thirty-eight times since NTS début in the inaugural contest in 1956. They have won the contest four times: in 1957 with the song "Net als toen" performed by Corry Brokken; in 1959 with the song "'n Beetje" performed by Teddy Scholten; in 1969 as one of four countries to tie for first place with "De troubadour" performed by Lenny Kuhr; and finally in 1975 with "Ding-a-dong" performed by the group Teach-In. The Dutch least successful result has been last place, which they have achieved on four occasions, most recently in the 1968 contest. They has also received nul points on two occasions; in 1962 and 1963.

As part of its duties as participating broadcaster, NOS organises the selection of its entry in the Eurovision Song Contest and broadcasts the event in the country. The Dutch broadcasters had used various methods to select the Dutch entry in the past, such as the Nationaal Songfestival, a live televised national final to choose the performer, song or both to compete at Eurovision. However, internal selections have also been held on occasion. In 1994, NOS has internally selected its artist for the contest, while Nationaal Songfestival was organised in order to select the song. For 1996, Nationaal Songfestival was continued to select both the artist and song.

== Before Eurovision ==
=== Nationaal Songfestival 1996 ===
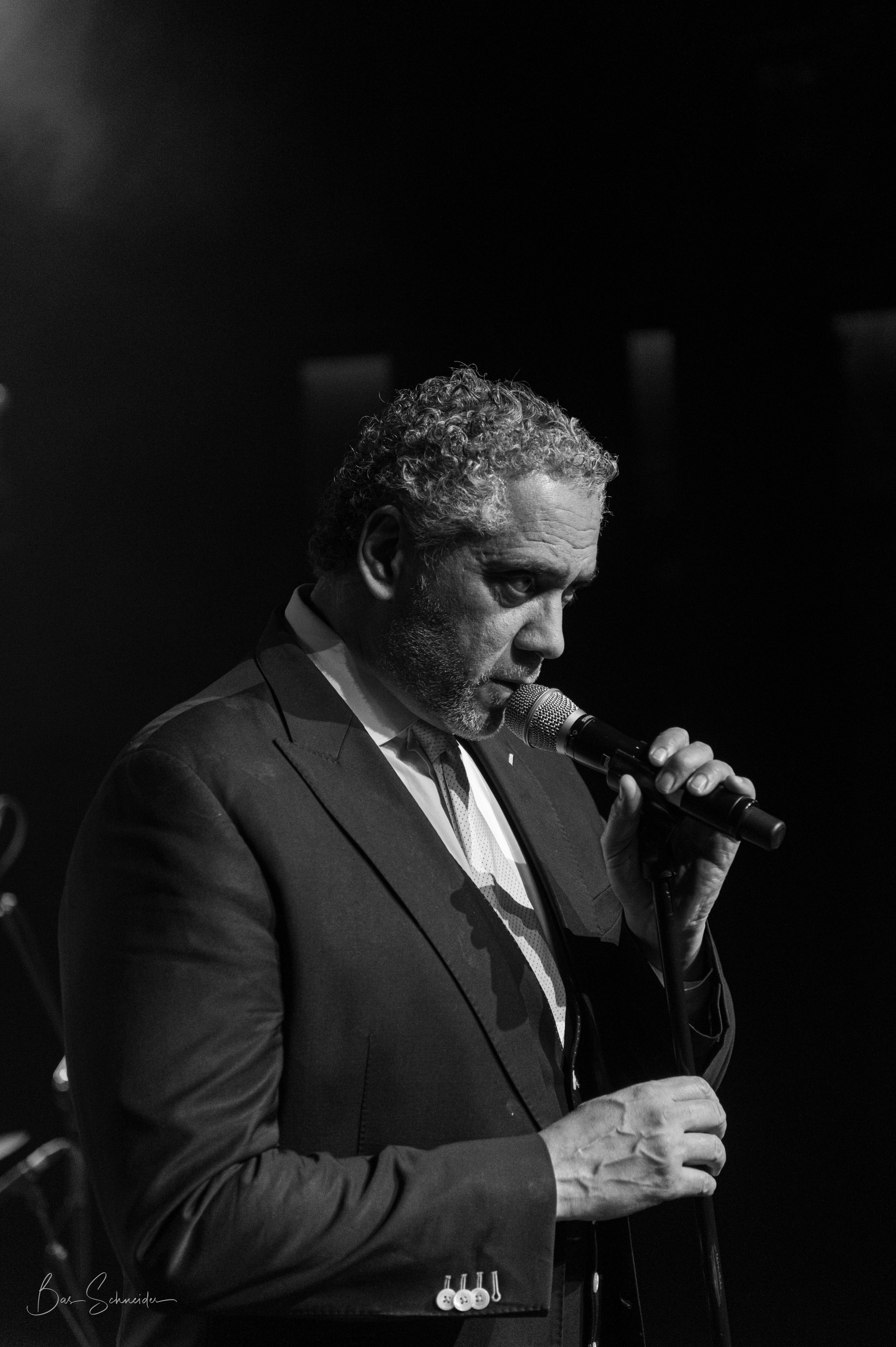
Franklin Brown (pictured in 2022) represented the Netherlands alongside Maxine after winning Nationaal Songfestival 1996

Nationaal Songfestival 1996 was the national final developed by NOS that selected its entry for the Eurovision Song Contest 1996. Five artists nominated by the Conamus music organisation competed in the competition consisting of six shows that commenced with the first of five semi-finals on 26 February 1996 and concluded with a final on 3 March 1996. All shows in the competition were broadcast on Nederland 2.

The semi-finals each featured one of the artists performing three candidate Eurovision songs, provided by Conamus from 300 songs received following a submission period for composers, from which public televoting exclusively selected one song for each act to complete the five-song lineup in the final. The five selected competing artists and their candidate songs were announced on 26 January 1996.

Competing entries
| Artist | Song | Songwriter(s) |
|---|---|---|
| Clau-dya's | "Als je hart klopt" | Ad van Olm |
| Clau-dya's | "Met of zonder jou" | Pim Koopman, Jeroen Englebert |
| Clau-dya's | "Mozart" | Henk Temming, Han Kooreneef, Michiel Eilbracht |
| Gina de Wit | "De kracht van je hart" | Gina de Wit |
| Gina de Wit | "De wereld is van jou" | Pim Koopman, Jeroen Englebert |
| Gina de Wit | "Jij hoort bij mij" | Gina de Wit |
| Lucretia van der Vloot | "Hoe hoger je klimt" | Franky Douglas, Arnout van Krimpen |
| Lucretia van der Vloot | "Neem de tijd voor mij" | Edwin de Groot, Rudi Nijhuis |
| Lucretia van der Vloot | "Neem me mee" | Michel Pos, Annemiek Woudt |
| Maxine and Franklin Brown | "Dat woordje wij" | Tom Bakker, Pieter Goemans |
| Maxine and Franklin Brown | "De eerste keer" | Piet Souer, Peter van Asten |
| Maxine and Franklin Brown | "Wie weet wat morgen brengt" | John Ewbank |
| Roland Verstappen | "Dan dansen wij" | Henk Post, Jelle Kooistra |
| Roland Verstappen | "Een woord van jou" | Peter Groot Kormelink, Herman Grimme |
| Roland Verstappen | "Ik wil alleen walsen met jou" | Roland Verstappen |

==== Semi-finals ====
The five semi-finals took place daily between 26 February and 1 March 1996 during the television programme De Week van het Songfestival. In each semi-final one act performed three candidate Eurovision songs and the winning song qualified to the final.

Semi-final 1 – 26 February 1996 – Roland Verstappen
| R/O | Song | Televote | Place |
|---|---|---|---|
| 1 | "Dan dansen wij" | 13% | 3 |
| 2 | "Een woord van jou" | 14% | 2 |
| 3 | "Ik wil alleen walsen met jou" | 73% | 1 |

Semi-final 2 – 27 February 1996 – Gina de Wit
| R/O | Song | Televote | Place |
|---|---|---|---|
| 1 | "De kracht van je hart" | 17% | 3 |
| 2 | "De wereld is van jou" | 57% | 1 |
| 3 | "Jij hoort bij mij" | 26% | 2 |

Semi-final 3 – 28 February 1996 – Maxine and Franklin Brown
| R/O | Song | Televote | Place |
|---|---|---|---|
| 1 | "Wie weet wat morgen brengt" | 21% | 3 |
| 2 | "De eerste keer" | 54% | 1 |
| 3 | "Dat woordje wij" | 25% | 2 |

Semi-final 4 – 29 February 1996 – Lucretia van der Vloot
| R/O | Song | Televote | Place |
|---|---|---|---|
| 1 | "Neem me mee" | 16% | 3 |
| 2 | "Hoe hoger je klimt" | 39% | 2 |
| 3 | "Neem de tijd voor mij" | 45% | 1 |

Semi-final 5 – 1 March 1996 – Clau-dya's
| R/O | Song | Televote | Place |
|---|---|---|---|
| 1 | "Met of zonder jou" | 27% | 3 |
| 2 | "Als je hart klopt" | 40% | 1 |
| 3 | "Mozart" | 33% | 2 |

==== Final ====
NOS held the final on 3 March 1996 at the Cinevideo Studio in Almere, hosted by Ivo Niehe. The five entries that qualified from the preceding five semi-finals competed, accompanied by the Metropole Orchestra conducted by Dick Bakker, and the winner, "De eerste keer" performed by Maxine and Franklin Brown, was selected by the votes of 13 regional juries of ten members each. In addition to the performances of the competing entries, the show featured guest performances by opera singers Mariska Mulder and Rein Kolpa.

Final – 3 March 1996
| R/O | Artist | Song | Points | Place |
|---|---|---|---|---|
| 1 | Gina de Wit | "De wereld is van jou" | 40 | 2 |
| 2 | Maxine and Franklin Brown | "De eerste keer" | 51 | 1 |
| 3 | Roland Verstappen | "Ik wil alleen walsen met jou" | 9 | 5 |
| 4 | Clau-dya's | "Als je hart klopt" | 12 | 4 |
| 5 | Lucretia van der Vloot | "Neem de tijd voor mij" | 31 | 3 |

Detailed Regional Jury Votes
| R/O | Song | North Brabant | Drenthe | Flevoland | Friesland | Gelderland | Limburg | Groningen | North Holland | Overijssel | South Holland | Utrecht | The Hague | Zeeland | Total |
|---|---|---|---|---|---|---|---|---|---|---|---|---|---|---|---|
| 1 | "De wereld is van jou" | 5 | 3 | 3 | 3 | 3 | 2 | 3 | 5 | 3 | 2 | 1 | 2 | 5 | 40 |
| 2 | "De eerste keer" | 1 | 5 | 5 | 5 | 5 | 3 | 2 | 3 | 5 | 5 | 5 | 5 | 2 | 51 |
| 3 | "Ik wil alleen walsen met jou" | 2 | 2 | | | | | 1 | 1 | | | 2 | 1 | | 9 |
| 4 | "Als je hart klopt" | 3 | 1 | 1 | 1 | 2 | 1 | | | 1 | 1 | | | 1 | 12 |
| 5 | "Neem de tijd voor mij" | | | 2 | 2 | 1 | 5 | 5 | 2 | 2 | 3 | 3 | 3 | 3 | 31 |

== At Eurovision ==
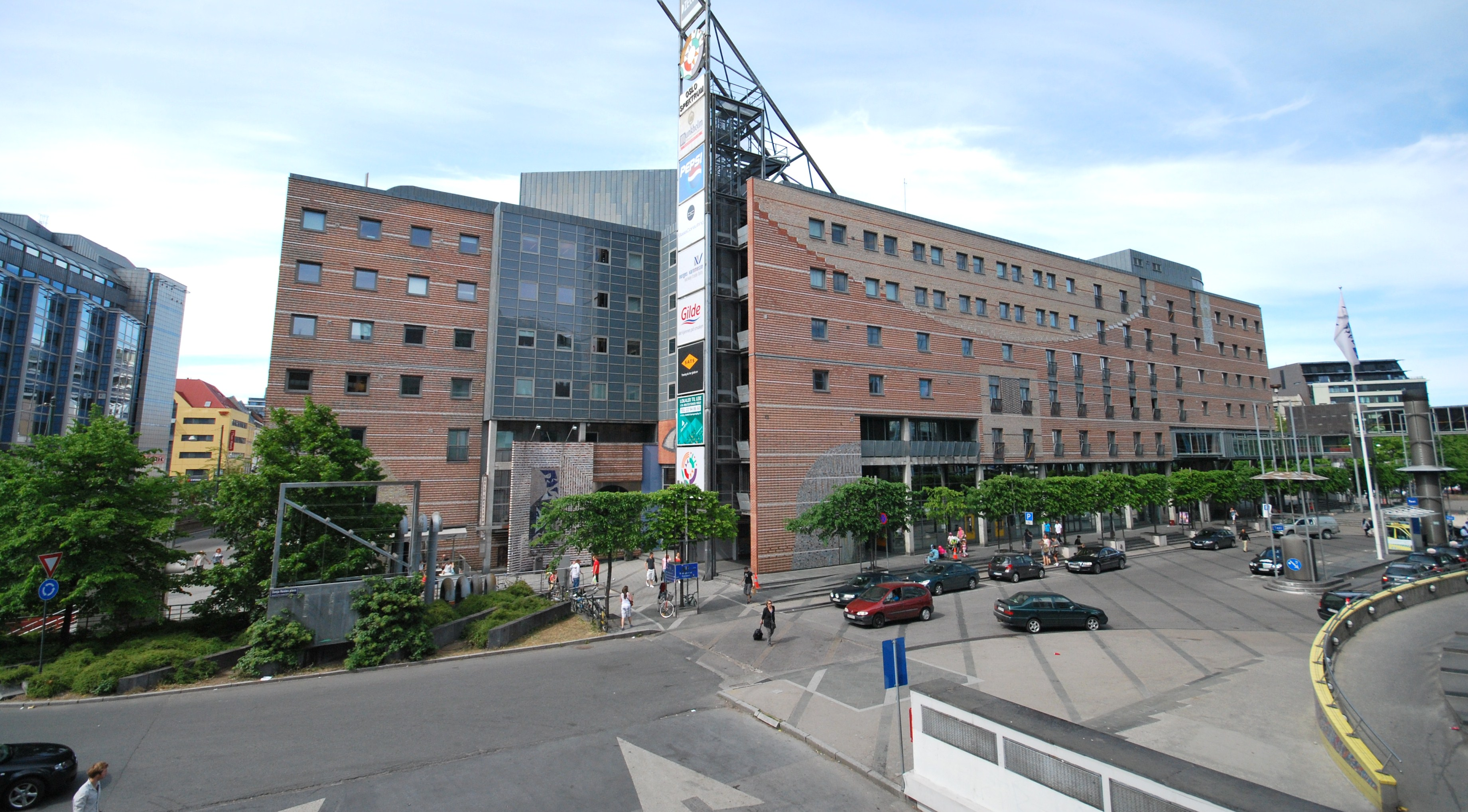
The Eurovision Song Contest 1996 took place at the Oslo Spektrum in Oslo, Norway, on 18 May 1996.

The Eurovision Song Contest 1996 took place at the Oslo Spektrum in Oslo, Norway, on 18 May 1996. According to the Eurovision rules, all nations with the exceptions of the host country were required to qualify from an audio qualifying round, held on 20 and 21 March 1996, in order to compete for the Eurovision Song Contest; the top twenty-two countries from the qualifying round progress to the contest. During the allocation draw which determined the running order of the final on 22 March 1996, the Netherlands was announced as having finished in the top 22 and subsequently qualifying for the contest. It was later revealed that the Netherlands placed ninth in the qualifying round, receiving a total of 63 points. Following the draw, the Netherlands was set to perform in position 15, following the entry from Slovenia and before the entry from Belgium. The Dutch conductor at the contest was Dick Bakker, and the Netherlands finished in seventh place with 78 points.

The contest was broadcast in the Netherlands on Nederland 2 with commentary by Willem van Beusekom as well as via radio on Radio 2. NOS appointed Marcha, who represented the Netherlands in 1987, as its spokesperson to announce the votes of the Dutch jury. The Dutch jury consisted of 8 professional jurors and 8 representatives of the public, with Sandra de Jong as the non-voting chairperson.

=== Voting ===
Below is a breakdown of points awarded to the Netherlands and awarded by the Netherlands in the contest. The nation awarded its 12 points to Sweden in the qualifying round and to Ireland in the final.

==== Qualifying round ====
Points awarded to the Netherlands (qualifying round)
| Score | Country |
|---|---|
| 12 points | Hungary; Portugal |
| 10 points | Denmark |
| 8 points | |
| 7 points | Macedonia |
| 6 points | |
| 5 points | Romania |
| 4 points | Belgium |
| 3 points | Iceland; Ireland; Switzerland |
| 2 points | France; Sweden |
| 1 point | |

Points awarded by the Netherlands (qualifying round)
| Score | Country |
|---|---|
| 12 points | Sweden |
| 10 points | Estonia |
| 8 points | Poland |
| 7 points | United Kingdom |
| 6 points | Ireland |
| 5 points | Switzerland |
| 4 points | Portugal |
| 3 points | Hungary |
| 2 points | Slovenia |
| 1 point | Macedonia |

==== Final ====
Points awarded to the Netherlands (final)
| Score | Country |
|---|---|
| 12 points | Austria |
| 10 points | France |
| 8 points | Sweden |
| 7 points | Poland; Portugal |
| 6 points | Spain |
| 5 points | Cyprus; Ireland; Slovenia |
| 4 points | Estonia |
| 3 points | Switzerland |
| 2 points | Bosnia and Herzegovina; Iceland |
| 1 point | Belgium; Turkey |

Points awarded by the Netherlands (final)
| Score | Country |
|---|---|
| 12 points | Ireland |
| 10 points | Norway |
| 8 points | Sweden |
| 7 points | Turkey |
| 6 points | Portugal |
| 5 points | Croatia |
| 4 points | Switzerland |
| 3 points | Estonia |
| 2 points | Belgium |
| 1 point | Greece |
