= Norway in the Eurovision Song Contest 1996 =

- Eurovision Song Contest 1996
- Participating broadcaster: Norsk rikskringkasting (NRK)
- Country: Norway
- Selection process: Melodi Grand Prix 1996
- Selection date: 30 March 1996

Competing entry
- Song: "I evighet"
- Artist: Elisabeth Andreassen
- Songwriter: Torhild Nigar

Placement
- Final result: 2nd, 114 points

Participation chronology

Norway was represented at the Eurovision Song Contest 1996 with the song "I evighet", written by Torhild Nigar, and performed by Elisabeth Andreassen. The Norwegian participating broadcaster, Norsk rikskringkasting (NRK), selected its entry through the Melodi Grand Prix 1996. In addition, NRK was also the host broadcaster and staged the event at the Oslo Spektrum in Oslo, after winning the previous edition with the song "Nocturne" by Secret Garden. This was the last of four Eurovision appearances as a main performer by Andreassen, a record shared with Lys Assia, Fud Leclerc, Valentina Monetta, and Peter, Sue and Marc.

== Before Eurovision ==
=== Melodi Grand Prix 1996 ===
Norsk rikskringkasting (NRK) held the Melodi Grand Prix 1996 at its studios in Oslo, hosted by Tande-P. Eight songs took part with the winner being chosen by voting from regional juries. Other participants included three-time Norwegian representative and MGP regular Jahn Teigen (as one of the duo To Tenorer) and Geir Rønning, who would later represent Finland in the 2005 contest.

Final – 30 March 1996
R/O	Artist	Song	Songwriter(s)	Points	Place
1	Scandinavia	"Når hjertet står i brann"	Tom Sennerud, Bjørn Terje Bråthen	12	8
2	Arnold B. Family	"Din smittende glede"	Thomas Børud, Arnold Børud	29	6
3	Elisabeth Andreassen	"I evighet"	Torhild Nigar	88	1
4	Stephen Ackles	"Jennina"	Geir Rønning	32	5
5	Mia Gundersen	"Tenn lys"	Inge Enoksen, Leiv Grøtte	28	7
6	Helga Hatløy Hagen and Marie Hatløy Osdal	"Frieri"	Helga Hatløy Hagen, Marie Hatløy Osdal	56	2
7	Geir Rønning	"Uten de'"	Geir Rønning	56	2
8	To Tenorer	"Ariel"	Sverre Wiik, Øystein Wiik	39	4

Detailed Regional Jury Votes
R/O	Song	Rogaland	Østfold	Finnmark	Sør-Trøndelag	Troms	Oppland	Østlandet	Hordaland	Sørlandet	Telemark	Total
1	"Når hjertet står i brann"	1			1		2	6		2		12
2	"Den smittende glede"	3	1	1	6	4		3	1	6	4	29
3	"I evighet"	4	10	6	10	10	10	10	10	8	10	88
4	"Jennina"		4	2	2	2	6	2	4	4	6	32
5	"Tenn lys"	8	3	3		1	1		6	3	3	28
6	"Frieri"	6	8	4	3	8	8	8	2	1	8	56
7	"Uten de'"	10	2	10	4	6	3	1	8	10	2	56
8	"Ariel"	2	6	8	8	3	4	4	3		1	39

== At Eurovision ==
The European Broadcasting Union granted Norway, as the host nation, exemption from an audio-only qualifying round which took place on 20 March with all 29 other participants competing to avoid the bottom seven placings which would mean early elimination from the 1996 contest and non-representation in Oslo.

On the night of the final Andreassen performed 12th in the running order, following Estonia and preceding France. At the close of voting "I evighet" had received 114 points, placing Norway second of the 23 entries. The highest marks received were three 10s from the Netherlands, Slovenia and Sweden – during the 1975-2015 period at the contest, "I evighet" was the best placed song without any 12 points. The Norwegian jury awarded its 12 points to Portugal.

Andreassen is one of five artists – along with Lys Assia, Gigliola Cinquetti, Linda Martin and Dima Bilan – to have finished both first and second at Eurovision.

=== Voting ===
==== Qualifying round ====
As the host nation, Norway automatically qualified for the final.

Points awarded by Norway (qualifying round)
Score	Country
12 points	Iceland
10 points	Estonia
8 points	United Kingdom
7 points	Sweden
6 points	Switzerland
5 points	Austria
4 points	Malta
3 points	Portugal
2 points	Belgium
1 point	Denmark

==== Final ====
Points awarded to Norway (final)
Score	Country
12 points	
10 points	Netherlands; Slovenia; Sweden
8 points	Austria; Belgium; Iceland; United Kingdom
7 points	Finland; France; Ireland; Switzerland
6 points	
5 points	Croatia; Estonia
4 points	Poland
3 points	Bosnia and Herzegovina; Cyprus
2 points	Portugal; Turkey
1 point	

Points awarded by Norway (final)
Score	Country
12 points	Portugal
10 points	Ireland
8 points	Estonia
7 points	Croatia
6 points	Sweden
5 points	Iceland
4 points	France
3 points	Greece
2 points	Finland
1 point	Malta
