= Mayianne Dinesen =

Danish radio personality

Mayianne Malin Holm Dinesen (born Marianne Dinesen on 29 April 1966 in Nykøbing Mors) is a Danish radio personality, having begun her career hosting the show Straight on DR P3 in 1992. She is perhaps better known for having dated American singer Prince.
