= Belgium in the Eurovision Song Contest 1996 =

- Eurovision Song Contest 1996
- Participating broadcaster: Belgische Radio- en Televisieomroep Nederlandstalige Uitzendingen (BRTN)
- Country: Belgium
- Selection process: De gouden zeemeermin
- Selection date: 9 March 1996

Competing entry
- Song: "Liefde is een kaartspel"
- Artist: Lisa del Bo
- Songwriters: John Terra; Siirak Brogden; Daniël Ditmar

Placement
- Final result: 16th, 22 points

Participation chronology

Belgium was represented at the Eurovision Song Contest 1996 with the song "Liefde is een kaartspel", composed by John Terra and Siirak Brogden, with lyrics by Daniël Ditmar, and performed by Lisa del Bo. The Belgian participating broadcaster, Flemish Belgische Radio- en Televisieomroep Nederlandstalige Uitzendingen (BRTN), selected its entry through a national final.

== Before Eurovision ==
=== De gouden zeemeermin ===
De gouden zeemeermin (English: The golden mermaid) was the national final format developed by Belgische Radio- en Televisieomroep Nederlandstalige Uitzendingen (BRTN) in order to select the Belgian entry for the Eurovision Song Contest 1996. 40 songs in total took part in the national final, which consisted of four semi-finals between 3 and 24 February 1996 and a final on 9 March 1996. All five shows took place at the Knokke Casino Studios in Knokke and were hosted by Michel Follet and Alexandra Potvin.

==== Competing entries ====
Artists wishing to compete in De gouden zeemeermin had to submit a photograph, biography, and at least two recorded songs to BRTN. Out of 117 applications, 40 were chosen to compete and they had until 8 January 1996 to submit a song. Prior to 8 January 1996, two candidates withdrew their participation: Katja Vandl and Ann Swartenbroeckx. They were replaced by Kaye and Chrissy.

Artist	Song	Songwriter(s)
Angie C	"Ritme van een lach"	Bauwens, Anne Clicteur
Aperitivo	"Jij"	Unknown
Axel Lane	"Laat me"	Unknown
Beau Geste	"Overmoed"	Dirk De Groef
Chadia	"Hou van mij"	Unknown
Chalina	"Toon wat"	Unknown
Chelsy	"Kijk me aan"	Sander Van der Heide
Chris	"De toekomst"	Ernst Vranckx, M. Geyskens
Chrissy	"Ik wil so graag bij jou zijn"	Chrissy Degraef, J. Lake, U. Vaneylen
Cold Pizza	"Vertrouwen"	Bart Tsiobbel
Corina	"Wereld van muziek"	Peter Keereman
Dave & Steve	"Geen illusie"	Fred Beekmans
Davy Gilles	"Elke nacht"	Jean-Pierre Daghelet, Dennis Peirs
Doran	"Jij alleen"	Piet Triest, Vira Bontemps, Christel Devos
En Zo	"Mooi"	Koen De Beir, Adriaan Larson, Filip D'haeze
Fair Play	"Laat haar niet alleen"	Carl Coenen, Marc Roefs, Ivo Roefs
Frank Valentino	"Hey Mister Lennon"	Sidro, Dennis Peirs
Garry Hagger	"Dat ik van je hou"	Fred Beekmans
Gunther Levi	"Vandaag"	Gunther Levi
Hans van den Stock	"Blijf steeds bij mij"	Unknown
Kaye	"Het nieuwe begint"	Unknown
Lisa del Bo	"Liefde is een kaartspel"	John Terra, Daniël Ditmar
Marijn De Valck	"Hou me in je hart"	Marc Malyster, Marijn De Valck
Mario Caselli	"Mademoiselle"	Chrystoff Wybouw, Patrick Hamilton
Marleen	"De kleine dingen"	Alides Hiding
Mieke	"Op dit moment"	Edwin Schimscheimer
Nadia	"Morgen komt de lente"	Lou Roman, Paul Vermeulen, Dieter Troubleyn
Onah	"Neem de biezen"	Verhelst
P.C. Brown	"Dans met mij"	Jan Pieter Liedmann
Patrick Alessi	"Een andere wereld"	Patrick Alessi
Peter Van Laet	"Er is iets"	Marc Van Hie, Walter Mannaerts, Peter Van Laet
Phil Kevin	"Als ik er niet meer ben"	Unknown
Pino	"Onbereikbaar maar dichtbij"	Bongiovanni, Alexandre
Rindu Rindu	"Golven van verlangen"	Fernande
Rudy Meyns	"Ik hou van jou"	Raymond Felix, Jacques Verburgt
Sabien Tiels	"Nooit meer alleen"	Sabien Tiels
Scharnier	"Oorlog"	Unknown
Splinter	"Ik laat je nooit meer gaan"	Guido Sergooris, Hedwig Desmesmaeker
Tempo	"M'n liefste"	Yves Segers
William Reven	"Zo voel ik vandaag"	Constant Verfaillie, Rodrigo Salgado, William Reven, Dennis Peirs

==== Semi-finals ====
Ten songs competed in each semi-final with the top three from each qualifying for the final. The results for the semi-finals were determined exclusively by a seven-member professional jury, who each awarded 12, 10, or 8–1 points to each song (i.e. they could award 12 points to more than one song if they chose). The professional jury consisted of: Guy De Pré, Leen Demaré, Marc Brillouet, Sabine De Vos, Marc De Schuyter, Nora Nys, and Ro Burms. Former Belgian Eurovision representative Jacques Raymond acted as a non-voting chairman of the jury.

Semi-final 1 – 3 February 1996
R/O	Artist	Song	Points	Place
1	Dave & Steve	"Geen illusie"	57	6
2	Chris	"De toekomst"	60	4 (Note: As there was a tie between third and fourth placed songs in the first semi-final, the tie for third place was broken by each judge naming their preferred song, with 5 choosing Garry Hagger against 2 choosing Chris.)
3	Garry Hagger	"Dat ik van je hou"	60	3
4	Chalina	"Toon wat"	37	9
5	Scharnier	"Oorlog"	44	8
6	Patrick Alessi	"Een andere wereld"	71	1
7	Marleen	"De kleine dingen"	50	7
8	Frank Valentino	"Hey Mister Lennon"	58	5
9	Mario Caselli	"Mademoiselle"	67	2
10	Rindu Rindu	"Golven van verlangen"	30	10

Semi-final 1 – Detailed Jury Votes
R/O	Song	Guy De Pré	Leen Demaré	Marc Brillouet	Sabine De Vos	Marc De Schuyter	Nora Nys	Ro Burms	Total
1	"Geen illusie"	10	5	12	8	8	7	7	57
2	"De toekomst"	8	12	7	10	8	8	7	60
3	"Dat ik van je hou"	8	5	10	12	10	5	10	60
4	"Toon wat"	6	4	8	4	6	4	5	37
5	"Oorlog"	5	10	7	4	7	5	6	44
6	"Een andere wereld"	10	12	10	10	12	10	7	71
7	"De kleine dingen"	6	7	8	6	8	7	8	50
8	"Hey Mister Lennon"	8	7	8	8	10	7	8	58
9	"Mademoiselle"	10	12	12	7	12	8	6	67
10	"Golven van verlangen"	5	3	4	4	6	3	5	30

Semi-final 2 – 10 February 1996
R/O	Artist	Song	Points	Place
1	Beau Geste	"Overmoed"	50	7
2	Axel Lane	"Laat me"	45	10
3	Chelsy	"Kijk me aan"	66	2
4	Gunther Levi	"Vandaag"	63	4
5	Angie C	"Ritme van een lach"	47	9
6	William Reven	"Zo voel ik vandaag"	64	3
7	Davy Gilles	"Elke nacht"	48	8
8	Mieke	"Op dit moment"	63	4
9	Fair Play	"Laat haar niet alleen"	51	6
10	Sabien Tiels	"Nooit meer alleen"	70	1

Semi-final 2 – Detailed Jury Votes
R/O	Song	Guy De Pré	Leen Demaré	Marc Brillouet	Sabine De Vos	Marc De Schuyter	Nora Nys	Ro Burms	Total
1	"Overmoed"	6	7	10	7	7	6	7	50
2	"Laat me"	5	5	7	7	7	6	8	45
3	"Kijk me aan"	6	12	8	12	10	10	8	66
4	"Vandaag"	10	10	8	6	10	7	12	63
5	"Ritme van een lach"	8	5	7	5	7	5	10	47
6	"Zo voel ik vandaag"	10	8	8	10	8	10	10	64
7	"Elke nacht"	8	5	7	6	8	7	7	48
8	"Op dit moment"	8	10	10	8	7	10	10	63
9	"Laat haar niet alleen"	7	7	8	7	8	7	7	51
10	"Nooit meer alleen"	10	10	12	8	10	10	10	70

Semi-final 3 – 17 February 1996
R/O	Artist	Song	Points	Place
1	En Zo	"Mooi"	74	1
2	Hans van den Stock	"Blijf steeds bij mij"	42	7
3	Chadia	"Hou van mij"	40	8
4	Phil Kevin	"Als ik er niet meer ben"	33	10
5	Kaye	"Het nieuwe begint"	34	9
6	Rudy Meyns	"Ik hou van jou"	49	6
7	Corina	"Wereld van muziek"	53	5
8	Marijn De Valck	"Hou me in je hart"	57	4
9	Splinter	"Ik laat je nooit meer gaan"	67	3
10	Lisa del Bo	"Liefde is een kaartspel"	72	2

Semi-final 3 – Detailed Jury Votes
R/O	Song	Guy De Pré	Leen Demaré	Marc Brillouet	Sabine De Vos	Marc De Schuyter	Nora Nys	Ro Burms	Total
1	"Mooi"	10	12	12	12	12	6	10	74
2	"Blijf steeds bij mij"	6	6	6	6	7	5	6	42
3	"Hou van mij"	4	3	6	6	8	6	6	40
4	"Als ik er niet meer ben"	6	5	6	2	6	4	5	33
5	"Het nieuwe begint"	5	4	6	2	7	4	6	34
6	"Ik hou van jou"	6	5	8	8	8	7	7	49
7	"Wereld van muziek"	10	8	7	5	10	6	7	53
8	"Hou me in je hart"	8	7	8	6	10	8	10	57
9	"Ik laat je nooit meer gaan"	12	12	10	10	10	6	7	67
10	"Liefde is een kaartspel"	12	10	10	10	10	8	12	72

Semi-final 4 – 24 February 1996
R/O	Artist	Song	Points	Place
1	Cold Pizza	"Vertrouwen"	55	4
2	Peter Van Laet	"Er is iets"	62	3
3	Onah	"Neem de biezen"	43	7
4	P.C. Brown	"Dans met mij"	40	9
5	Nadia	"Morgen komt de lente"	66	1
6	Tempo	"M'n liefste"	54	5
7	Pino	"Onbereikbaar maar dichtbij"	43	7
8	Aperitivo	"Jij"	28	10
9	Doran	"Jij alleen"	64	2
10	Chrissy	"Ik wil so graag bij jou zijn"	47	6

Semi-final 4 – Detailed Jury Votes
R/O	Song	Guy De Pré	Leen Demaré	Marc Brillouet	Sabine De Vos	Marc De Schuyter	Nora Nys	Ro Burms	Total
1	"Vertrouwen"	10	8	8	7	8	7	7	55
2	"Er is iets"	7	12	8	8	12	7	8	62
3	"Neem de biezen"	6	6	6	5	8	6	6	43
4	"Dans met mij"	6	3	8	5	6	4	8	40
5	"Morgen komt de lente"	8	8	8	10	10	10	12	66
6	"M'n liefste"	10	6	10	7	7	7	7	54
7	"Onbereikbaar maar dichtbij"	7	4	8	3	8	5	8	43
8	"Jij"	3	3	5	4	5	3	5	28
9	"Jij alleen"	10	7	12	7	8	10	10	64
10	"Ik wil so graag bij jou zijn"	7	6	8	6	8	6	6	47

==== Final ====
The final took place on 9 March 1996 and the twelve entries that advanced from the preceding four semi-finals competed. The winner was selected by a combination of votes from five regional juries in Belgium (25%), a press jury (25%) and a professional jury (50%). The professional jury consisted of the same seven members as in the semi-finals. "Liefde is een kaartspel" performed by Lisa del Bo was selected as the winner, having been ranked first by all but the press jury.

Final – 9 March 1996
R/O	Artist	Song	Points	Place
1	Lisa del Bo	"Liefde is een kaartspel"	215	1
2	Patrick Alessi	"Een andere wereld"	73	11
3	Chelsy	"Kijk me aan"	128	8
4	William Reven	"Zo voel ik vandaag"	119	9
5	Nadia	"Morgen komt de lente"	135	7
6	Peter Van Laet	"Er is iets"	143	4
7	Sabine Tiels	"Nooit meer alleen"	139	6
8	Doran	"Jij alleen"	37	12
9	Garry Hagger	"Dat ik van je hou"	141	5
10	Splinter	"Ik laat je nooit meer gaan"	189	2
11	En Zo	"Mooi"	151	3
12	Mario Caselli	"Mademoiselle"	90	10

Detailed Jury Votes
R/O	Song	Regional Juries					Press Jury	Expert Jury	Total
R/O	Song	Antwerp	Limburg	East Flanders	Flemish Brabant	West Flanders	Press Jury	Expert Jury	Total
1	"Liefde is een kaartspel"	12	12	12	12	12	35	120	215
2	"Een andere wereld"	2	2	5	3	1	40	20	73
3	"Kijk me aan"	8	5	6	8	6	5	90	128
4	"Zo voel ik vandaag"	1	1	3	2	2	50	60	119
5	"Morgen komt de lente"	5	6	7	7	5	25	80	135
6	"Er is iets"	10	9	9	11	9	55	40	143
7	"Nooit meer alleen"	4	11	1	5	3	15	100	139
8	"Jij alleen"	3	4	2	1	7	10	10	37
9	"Dat ik van je hou"	6	8	4	4	4	45	70	141
10	"Ik laat je nooit meer gaan"	11	10	8	10	10	30	110	189
11	"Mooi"	9	7	11	6	8	60	50	151
12	"Mademoiselle"	7	3	10	9	11	20	30	90

== At Eurovision ==
In 1996, for the only time in Eurovision history, an audio-only qualifying round of the 29 songs entered (excluding hosts Norway who were exempt) was held in March in order for the seven lowest-scoring songs to be eliminated before the final. "Liefde is een kaartspel" placed 12th, thus qualifying for the final. As of 2025, this is the last time that Belgium had sung its entry in Dutch.

On the night of the final del Bo performed 16th in the running order, following the Netherlands and preceding the eventual winner Ireland. At the close of the voting "Liefde is een kaartspel" placed 16th of the 23 entries, having received 22 points. The result was not good enough to prevent Belgium from being relegated from the 1997 contest on the cumulative countback rule. The Belgian jury awarded its 12 points to the United Kingdom.

"Liefde is een kaartspel" later became embroiled in controversy when it was alleged that it had been plagiarised by the Swedish 2001 entry "Listen To Your Heartbeat". This was initially denied by the writers of the Swedish song, but Belgian songwriters' association SABAM threatened legal action, and a cash settlement was agreed to forestall this.

=== Voting ===
==== Qualifying round ====
Points awarded to Belgium (qualifying round)
Score	Country
12 points	
10 points	
8 points	Spain
7 points	United Kingdom
6 points	Israel; Portugal
5 points	
4 points	Finland; Ireland; Poland
3 points	
2 points	Norway; Romania; Turkey
1 point	

Points awarded by Belgium (qualifying round)
Score	Country
12 points	Sweden
10 points	Malta
8 points	Ireland
7 points	United Kingdom
6 points	Portugal
5 points	Estonia
4 points	Netherlands
3 points	Switzerland
2 points	Slovenia
1 point	Austria

==== Final ====
Points awarded to Belgium (final)
Score	Country
12 points	Spain
10 points	
8 points	
7 points	
6 points	
5 points	United Kingdom
4 points	
3 points	
2 points	Croatia; Netherlands
1 point	Estonia

Points awarded by Belgium (final)
Score	Country
12 points	United Kingdom
10 points	Sweden
8 points	Norway
7 points	France
6 points	Portugal
5 points	Turkey
4 points	Croatia
3 points	Ireland
2 points	Switzerland
1 point	Netherlands
