= Tüzmen =

Tüzmen is a Turkish surname. Notable people with the surname include:

- Kürşad Tüzmen (born 1958), Turkish Minister of State
- Tarkan Tüzmen (born 1968), Turkish singer and actor
