= Liefde is een kaartspel =

1996 song by Lisa del Bo

Single by Lisa del Bo
- Language: Dutch
- Released: 1984
- Composers: John Terra; Siirak Brogden
- Lyricist: Daniël Ditmar

Eurovision Song Contest 1996 entry
- Country: Belgium
- Artist: Lisa del Bo
- Language: Dutch
- Composers: John Terra; Siirak Brogden
- Lyricist: Daniël Ditmar
- Conductor: Bob Porter

Finals performance
- Final result: 16th
- Final points: 22

Entry chronology
- ◄ "La voix est libre" (1995)
- "Dis oui" (1998) ►

"Liefde is een kaartspel" (Dutch pronunciation: [ˈlivdə ʔɪs əŋ ˈkaːrtspɛl]; "Love is a Card Game") is a song performed by Lisa del Bo. It represented Belgium in the Eurovision Song Contest 1996.

The song was performed seventeenth on the night, following the Netherlands' Maxine & Franklin Brown with "De eerste keer" and preceding Ireland's Eimear Quinn with "The Voice". At the close of voting, it had received 22 points, placing 16th in a field of 23.

The song features Del Bo likening love to a card game. She describes a relationship which appears not to have been based on honesty, which explains the metaphor. The song was recorded in Dutch, French (as "Comme au jeu de cartes"), English ("Love is Like a Card Game") and German ("Liebe ist ein Kartenspiel").

Due to the contest's rapid expansion, entry in the 1997 contest was limited to those countries with the best average scores over the past five years – a group of which Belgium again was not a member, the first time being at the 1994 contest. As a "passive country" (one which broadcast but did not enter the contest), Belgium was, however, able to enter the 1998 edition. Thus, "Liefde is een kaartspel" was succeeded as Belgian representative at the 1998 contest by Mélanie Cohl singing "Dis oui".

The song became part of a controversy after it was claimed that the 2001 Swedish Eurovision entry "Listen to Your Heartbeat" was plagiarised from it. At first this was denied by the Swedish songwriters, one of whom was Thomas G:son, but after the Belgian songwriters and the author's organisation SABAM pressed for legal action, a cash settlement was agreed.

== Charts ==
Chart (1996)	Peak position
Belgium (Ultratop 50 Flanders)	2
