= Israel in the Eurovision Song Contest 1996 =

- Eurovision Song Contest 1996
- Participating broadcaster: Israel Broadcasting Authority (IBA)
- Country: Israel
- Selection process: Kdam Eurovision 1996
- Selection date: 29 February 1996

Competing entry
- Song: "Shalom Olam"
- Artist: Galit Bell
- Songwriters: Eyal Madan; Doran Vitenberg

Placement
- Final result: Failed to qualify (28th)

Participation chronology

Israel was represented at the qualifying round for the Eurovision Song Contest 1996 with the song "Shalom Olam", written by Eyal Madan and Doran Vitenberg, and performed by Galit Bell. The Israeli participating broadcaster, the Israel Broadcasting Authority (IBA), selected its entry through Kdam Eurovision 1996. The entry failed to make it through the pre-selection round.

== Before Eurovision ==
=== Kdam Eurovision 1996 ===
The Israel Broadcasting Authority (IBA) held the national final on 29 February 1996 at the Neve Ilan TV Studios in Jerusalem, hosted by Ron Leventhal and Tal Man. Twelve entries competed and the winner, "Shalom Olam" performed by Galit Bell, was selected by the votes of seven regional juries.

Final – 29 February 1996
R/O	Artist	Song	Composer(s)	Points	Place
1	Galit Bell	"Shalom Olam"	Eyal Madan, Doran Vitenberg	70	1
2	Orit Sharabi	"Al Chomotaich"	Shlomo Perry	8	12
3	Alon Jan and Izhar Cohen	"Alpa'im"	Ehud Manor, Izhar Cohen	16	10
4	Navi Shalom	"Im Ta'aminu"	Nissan Fridman, Amos Barzel	38	5
5	Ilana Avital	"Laisse-moi t'aime"	Yoav Ginay, Ilana Avital	30	7
6	Doron Mazar	"At Ahavati"	Dudu Barak, Doron Mazar, Gavri Mazor	56	2
7	Off Simches	"Oi Oi Oi"	Yishai Lapidot	37	6
8	Doron Oren	"Me'abed Tzura"	Ron Rosenfeld	11	11
9	Samir Shukri and Ayelet Tasa	"Tnu Yad"	Nurit Bat-Shahar Tzafrir, Yoni Roeh	47	3
10	Yuji Gabai	"Ta'rimu Ta Rating"	Nurit Bat-Shahar Tzafrir, Yuji Gabai	27	8
11	Keti El-Hai	"Imma Imma Em"	Dudu Barak, Yoni Roeh	19	9
12	Tamir Tzaidi	"Eize Min Olam"	Sigal Lavi, Noa Gino	47	3

Detailed Regional Jury Votes
R/O	Song	Ma'alot-Tarshiha	Nazareth	Glil Yam	Be'er Sheva	Haifa	Jerusalem	Tel Aviv	Total
1	"Shalom Olam"	12	8	6	10	10	12	12	70
2	"Al Chomotaich"	4			2		2		8
3	"Alpa'im"	3	2	5	5	1			16
4	"Im Ta'aminu"		7	12	6	5	3	5	38
5	"Laisse-moi t'aime"	5	3	4	3	7	1	7	30
6	"At Ahavati"	10	6	7	8	12	5	8	56
7	"Oi Oi Oi"	6		10	4	6	8	3	37
8	"Me'abed Tzura"		1	3		2	4	1	11
9	"Tnu Yad"	8	5	2	12	8	6	6	47
10	"Ta'rimu Ta Rating"	1	10	1		3	10	2	27
11	"Imma Imma Em"	2	12		1			4	19
12	"Eize Min Olam"	7	4	8	7	4	7	10	47

== At Eurovision ==
In 1996, for the only time in Eurovision history, an audio-only pre-qualifying round (from which hosts Norway were exempt) was held on 20 March as 29 countries wished to participate in the final but the European Broadcasting Union had set a limit of 22 (plus Norway). The countries occupying the bottom seven places after the pre-qualifier would be unable to take part in the main contest. After the voting, "Shalom Olam" had received 12 points, placing 28th and eliminating Israel from the contest.

The contest was broadcast on Channel 1.

=== Voting ===
Points awarded to Israel (qualifying round)
Score	Country
12 points	
10 points	
8 points	
7 points	
6 points	
5 points	Turkey
4 points	Macedonia
3 points	France
2 points	
1 point	

Points awarded by Israel (qualifying round)
Score	Country
12 points	United Kingdom
10 points	Ireland
8 points	Sweden
7 points	Iceland
6 points	Belgium
5 points	Finland
4 points	Turkey
3 points	Germany
2 points	Greece
1 point	Portugal
