= Levent Çoker =

Turkish musician (born 1958)

Bahri Levent Çoker (born 21 November 1958) is a Turkish musician, arranger, conductor, and composer who represented Turkey in the Eurovision Song Contest as a composer, arranger and conductor in 1996 and 1997. His song "Dinle" won 3rd place in Eurovision Song Contest 1997 and was the country's best result since Turkey began participating in the contest, and remained so until 2003, when soprano pop star Sertab Erener attained the top spot.

== Biography ==
Born in the northwestern Anatolian city of İzmit, the administrative center of Kocaeli Province, Levent Çoker completed his primary education in İskenderun in the south of Turkey. In 1971, he enrolled at the Ankara State Conservatory to study musical performance with an emphasis on playing the trombone.

He was a member of Istanbul State Symphony Orchestra from 1979 to 2009 and has composed for opera and ballet as well as for symphony orchestras and bands, along with winning several national music contests.

== Works ==
- Hayal Yolcuları [The Dream Passengers] (ballet)
- Senfonik Süit [Symphonic Suite]
- Fanfare for Brass and Percussion
- Keman, Çello ve Piyano için Trio [Trio for Violin, Cello and Piano]
- Beşinci Mevsim / 1996 Eurovision Song Contest entry of Turkey, performed by Şebnem Paker, finished 12th
- Dinle / 1997 Eurovision Song Contest entry of Turkey, performed by Şebnem Paker, finished 3rd
