= Bettina Soriat =

Austrian singer

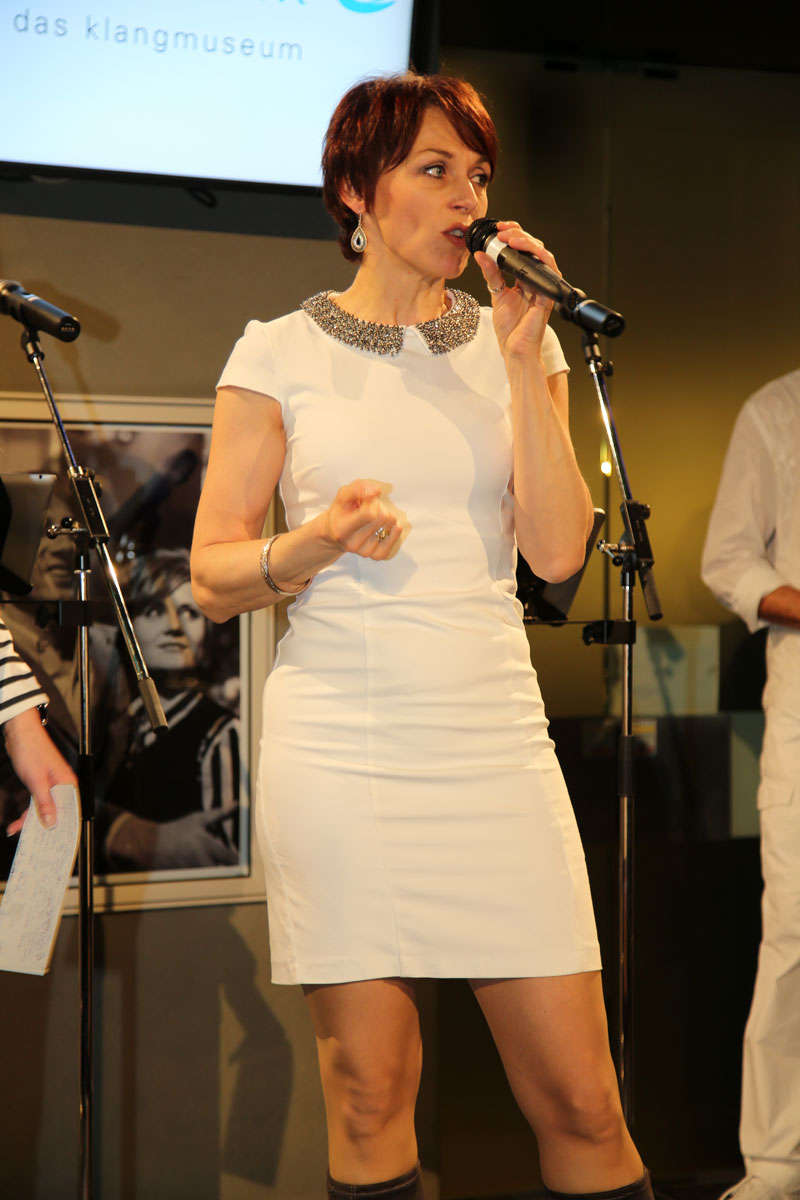

Background information
- Born: March 16, 1967 (age 59)
- Occupation: Singer
- Formerly of: Three Girl Madhouse

Bettina Soriat (born 16 March 1967 in Linz) is an Austrian singer.

Bettina Soriat is a singer, dancer, actress, comedian, and choreographer. Her first success came with the girlgroup "Three Girl Madhouse" and their single-hit "Always gonna be around you" was released in 1990.

== Appearances ==
Bettina has appeared in musicals in Vienna, including:

- "Robin Hood" (1991)
- "Rocky Horror Picture Show" (1993)
- "Sweet Charity" (1994)
- "Grease" (1995)
- "Blondel" (1996)

As a long-time member of the Kim-Duddy-TV-Ballet, Bettina also appeared in shows like:

- "Willkommen im Club" (1991) (Welcome in the Club)
- "Nix is fix" (1993/94)
- "Die Peter Alexander Show" (1995).

In 1997 she was Austria's Song Contest-representative with the song "One Step". The song wasn't a great success, placing 21st in a field of 25. Despite having an English title, the song is primarily in German.

In the previous year she sang back-up vocals for Austria's George Nussbaumer at the same contest. She was married to Michael Niavarani and is a member of the Simpl Revue since 1999. They currently have one child together.

| Preceded by George Nussbaumer | Austria in the Eurovision Song Contest; 1997 | Succeeded by Bobbie Singer |
