= Turkey in the Eurovision Song Contest 1996 =

- Eurovision Song Contest 1996
- Participating broadcaster: Turkish Radio and Television Corporation (TRT)
- Country: Turkey
- Selection process: 19. Eurovision Şarkı Yarışması Türkiye Finali
- Selection date: 17 February 1996

Competing entry
- Song: "Beşinci Mevsim"
- Artist: Şebnem Paker
- Songwriters: Levent Çoker; Selma Çuhacı

Placement
- Final result: 12th, 57 points

Participation chronology

Turkey was represented at the Eurovision Song Contest 1996 with the song "Beşinci Mevsim", composed by Levent Çoker, with lyrics by Selma Çuhacı, and performed by Şebnem Paker. The Turkish participating broadcaster, the Turkish Radio and Television Corporation (TRT), selected its entry through a national final.

== Before Eurovision ==
=== 19. Eurovision Şarkı Yarışması Türkiye Finali ===
The Turkish Radio and Television Corporation (TRT) developed 19. Eurovision Şarkı Yarışması Türkiye Finali in order to select its entry for the Eurovision Song Contest 1996.

==== Competing entries ====
TRT opened the submission period for interested artists and composers to submit their entries. 96 songs were ultimately submitted, from which, 10 were selected by jury panel for the national final.

==== Final ====
TRT held the national final on 17 February 1996 at its television studios in Ankara, hosted by Bülent Özveren. Ten songs competed and the winner was determined by an expert jury.

R/O	Artist	Song	Lyricist	Composer	Place
1	Semih Bayraktar	"Yoruldu Düşlerim"	Çağatay Özkan	Semih Bayraktar	—
2	Suavi	"Dön Gel Artık Bana"	Suavi Saygan	Suavi Saygan	—
3	Suat Yıldırım & Zeynep Poyraz	"Sevgiyle"	Suat Yıldırım	Zeynep Poyraz	—
4	Coşkun Demir	"Hep Bir Yarın Var"	Selma Çuhacı	Mine Mucur	—
5	Şebnem Paker	"Beşinci Mevsim"	Selma Çuhacı	Levent Çoker	1
6	Sedat Yüce	"Vazgeç"	Savaş Savaşan	Savaş Savaşan	3
7	Pınar Karakoç & Tüzmen	"Var mısın Söyle"	Canan Tunç	Erdinç Tunç	2
8	Nursel Mucu	"Masal"	Nursel Mucu	Serkan Sönmez	—
9	Şebnem Özsaran	"Poyraz"	Aysel Gürel	Müfit Bayraşa	—
10	Tüzmen	"Bilirsin ya"	Semih Güneri	Semih Güneri	—

== At Eurovision ==
On the night of the contest Şebnem Paker performed 1st in the running order preceding United Kingdom. At the close of the voting the song had received 57 points placing Turkey 12th. The Turkish jury awarded its 12 points to Ireland. The members of the Turkish jury included Nursal Tekin, Taner Dedeoğlu, Erol Evgin, Melih Kibar, Sonat Bağcan, Nejat Çarkacı, Pınar Karakoç, İlter Yeşilay, Meral Geray, Pınar Türkoğlu, Müveddet Nil Özbay, Fatma Asuman Yıldırım, Murat Karahan, Merter Beton, Murat Özcan, and Arsel Aktaç.

=== Voting ===
==== Qualifying round ====
Points awarded to Turkey (qualifying round)
Score	Country
12 points	
10 points	Spain; Switzerland
8 points	Bosnia and Herzegovina; Poland
7 points	Malta
6 points	Finland
5 points	
4 points	Croatia; Iceland; Israel; United Kingdom
3 points	Sweden
2 points	
1 point	Portugal

Points awarded by Turkey (qualifying round)
Score	Country
12 points	United Kingdom
10 points	Ireland
8 points	Sweden
7 points	Malta
6 points	Switzerland
5 points	Israel
4 points	Spain
3 points	France
2 points	Belgium
1 point	Portugal

==== Final ====
Points awarded to Turkey (final)
Score	Country
12 points	
10 points	Malta
8 points	Spain
7 points	Netherlands
6 points	Switzerland; United Kingdom
5 points	Belgium; Bosnia and Herzegovina; Finland
4 points	France
3 points	
2 points	
1 point	Croatia

Points awarded by Turkey (final)
Score	Country
12 points	Ireland
10 points	Malta
8 points	Croatia
7 points	Poland
6 points	Bosnia and Herzegovina
5 points	Portugal
4 points	Austria
3 points	United Kingdom
2 points	Norway
1 point	Netherlands
