= Turkey in the Eurovision Song Contest =

- Eurovision Song Contest
- Participating broadcaster: Turkish Radio and Television Corporation (TRT)

Participation summary
- Appearances: 34 (33 finals)
- First appearance: 1975
- Last appearance: 2012
- Highest placement: 1st: 2003
- Host: 2004
- Participation history: 1975; 1976; 1977; 1978; ~~1979~~; 1980; 1981; 1982; 1983; 1984; 1985; 1986; 1987; 1988; 1989; 1990; 1991; 1992; 1993; 1994; 1995; 1996; 1997; 1998; 1999; 2000; 2001; 2002; 2003; 2004; 2005; 2006; 2007; 2008; 2009; 2010; 2011; 2012; 2013 – 2026
- Turkey's page at Eurovision.com
- For the most recent participation see Turkey in the Eurovision Song Contest 2012

Turkey has been represented at the Eurovision Song Contest 34 times since its debut in 1975. The Turkish participating broadcaster in the contest is the Turkish Radio and Television Corporation (TRT). Turkey won the contest once in 2003, and hosted the 2004 contest in Istanbul. Since the introduction of the semi-finals in 2004, Turkey has only failed to qualify for the final once, in 2011.

Turkey finished last on its debut at the contest in 1975, and went on to finish last with nul points in 1983 and 1987. They reached the top ten for the first time in 1986. "Dinle" performed by Şebnem Paker achieved the country's first top five result in 1997, finishing third. The country went on to achieve five more top five placements after the introduction of the free language rule and televoting, with "Everyway That I Can" by Sertab Erener giving Turkey its first victory in 2003. Turkey's other top five results are "For Real" by Athena (2004), "Shake It Up Şekerim" by Kenan Doğulu (2007), "Düm Tek Tek" by Hadise (2009), who all finished fourth, and "We Could Be the Same" by Manga (2010), who finished second.

TRT announced in December 2012 that it would not participate in the 2013 contest, citing dissatisfaction with the rules of the competition. 2013 was the first time since 1979 that there was no television broadcast of the Eurovision Song Contest on TRT. The country has not returned to the contest since.

== Participation ==
Türkiye Radyoları, the national radio broadcasting service of Turkey, was one of the founding members of the European Broadcasting Union (EBU) in 1950 along with other twenty-two broadcasting organisations; after beginning regular television broadcasts in December 1971, it would renew its EBU membership on 26 August 1972 fold as Türkiye Radyo ve Televizyon Kurumu (TRT). Its membership in the EBU is possible since Turkey is within the European Broadcasting Area and is a member of the Council of Europe.

As a full member of the EBU, TRT is eligible to participate in the Eurovision Song Contest. It had participated in the contest representing Turkey since its 20th edition in 1975 until the 57th edition in 2012. TRT televised the contest between 1973 and 2012, even during the years in which it did not enter the competition.

== History ==
=== 1970s ===
Turkey made its debut at the 1975 contest in Stockholm. Greece did not take part in the contest for "unknown reasons" according to the EBU, but it was later revealed that the withdrawal was in protest of Turkey's debut and their invasion of Cyprus in 1974. TRT organized a national final to select the first ever Turkish entrant to the Eurovision Song Contest. The final took place on 9 February 1975 in the studios of TRT and was hosted by Bülend Özveren. 106 songs were submitted for the national final. The winning song, "Seninle Bir Dakika" ("A minute with you") by Semiha Yankı, was picked by averaging the ranks from the professional jury and people's jury. At the close of voting during the contest, the song received only three points from Monaco and placed last.

In 1976, Greece's entry to the contest aroused controversy due to its subject matter being the Turkish invasion of Cyprus. Turkey withdrew from the contest to protest the political background of Greece's entry, called "Panagia mou, panagia mou." Turkey televised the final on 3 April 1976 but censored the Greek entrant's performance. They played a Turkish patriotic song titled "Memleketim" ("My Homeland", the Turkish cover of the Yiddish folk song "Rabbi Elimelekh"), which was one of the symbols of the Turkish invasion of Cyprus in Turkey.

Turkey did not take part in the contest again until 1978, placing 18th with the song "Sevince" performed by Nazar and Nilüfer.

The 1979 contest was held in Jerusalem. The Turkish entry selected was "Seviyorum" ("I'm in love") by Maria Rita Epik. However, Turkey withdrew from the contest due to pressure from neighboring Arab countries to do so, which arose from the ongoing controversy regarding the status of Jerusalem.

=== 1980s ===
Turkey participated in the Eurovision Song Contest consistently throughout the 1980s. In 1980, Turkish superstar Ajda Pekkan and the song "Petrol" was selected by TRT through a national final. Pekkan placed 15th with 23 points, including the first ever score 12 points received by Turkey, coming from Morocco.

Turkey had their best result (until 1997) in the 1986 contest in Bergen, Norway, when Klips ve Onlar placed ninth with a total of 53 points. The country scored nul points twice in the eighties, first in 1983 (shared with Spain) and later in 1987. Several famous Turkish artists performed for the contest during the 1980s, including Ajda Pekkan, Neco, Candan Erçetin and MFÖ.

=== 1990s ===
The contest's popularity in Turkey suffered after Kayahan, one of the most famous singers in the country, placed 17th out of 22 participating countries with 21 points. After Kayahan's poor result, Turkey's Eurovision entrants were mostly unknown or amateur singers until 2003.

Şebnem Paker represented the country in two consecutive years. The first time being in 1996 where she qualified for the final and placed 12th, and the second in 1997 where she placed third, behind the UK and Ireland, with the song "Dinle" ("Listen"), sung in Turkish. This was the first time ever Turkey managed to make it in the top three and also it became the most successful result for the country until its victory in 2003. Şebnem Paker returned to the Turkish national final in 1998, but placed fourth and did not qualify for the contest as the Turkish participant for a third consecutive year. Tüzmen represented the country and placed 14th. Turkey participated throughout all of the 1990s except for the 1994 contest, from which they were relegated due to their 21st-place finish in 1993.

After the free language rule was re-introduced in 1999, the first Turkish entry to be partially sung in English was at the 2000 contest. The same year, Turkey reached the top 10 for a third since 1986, finishing tenth.

=== 2000s and 2010s ===
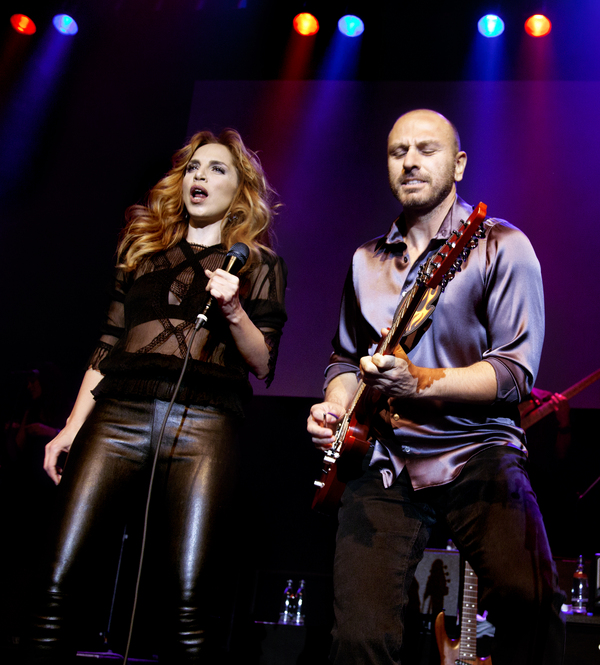
Sertab Erener (left) and Demir Demirkan (right), winning songwriters of the 2003 contest.

In the late 1990s to early 2000s, the contest became one of the most popular events in Turkey as a result of the participation of other Central and Eastern European countries, and Sertab Erener's win in 2003 with the song "Everyway That I Can". Following the introduction of televoting in 1998, (initially trialed in 1997 and first implemented in Turkey in 2003), Turkey went on to achieve eight top 10 results in the contest.

"Everyway That I Can" was the first Turkish entry in the contest to be sung completely in English. TRT selected the entry through an internal selection mainly organised by OGAE Turkey.

The 2004 contest was held in the Abdi Ipekci Arena, with the first-ever semi-final held on 12 May, followed by the final on 15 May. After Erener's victory (with the exception of the 2004 and 2005 contests), Turkish entries to the contest were chosen internally. Turkey qualified for the final every year since the introduction of the semi-finals in 2004 except for the 2011 contest in Düsseldorf and reached the top ten every year except in 2005 and 2006 and of course 2011. From 2000, Turkey had seven songs sung in English and four sung in both English and Turkish, with just three (2005, 2006, and 2008) songs sung entirely in Turkish.

Along with Greece, Turkey brought the contest a new outlook with flashy stage performances and dresses alongside their oriental/Mediterranean-flavoured pop music acts (Sertab Erener, Sibel Tüzün, Kenan Doğulu and Hadise). In 2004, 2008, 2010, and 2011, the country was represented by bands, most of them with rock-influenced songs with Ottoman, Eastern European and Balkan instruments. Athena ranked fourth in 2004, when the contest was held in Istanbul; Mor ve Ötesi ranked seventh with a song completely in Turkish in 2008 and the nu metal band Manga, named the Best European Act in the MTV Europe Music Awards 2009, ranked second in 2010. Yüksek Sadakat in 2011 placed 13th in the first semi-final of the contest and failed to qualify, marking the first and only time that Turkey failed to qualify for the final. The most recent Turkish participation in 2012 saw Can Bonomo with the song "Love Me Back" placing seventh with 112 points.

=== 2013–present: Absence ===
TRT announced that it would not participate in the 2013 contest on 14 December 2012, citing dissatisfaction with the rules of the competition. TRT specifically cited changes to the voting system, in which a jury was introduced and the televote's influence was decreased to 50%. Turkey has not participated in or broadcast the contest since. In August 2018, İbrahim Eren, the Director-General of TRT, stated that TRT does not plan to return to the contest and break the boycott for various reasons, citing Conchita Wurst's participation and eventual victory in 2014. The EBU and Eren entered talks on a potential Turkish return ahead of 2022 contest; despite this, the country was not on the final list of participants.

== Participation overview ==
Table key
1	First place
2	Second place
3	Third place
◁	Last place
◇	Entry selected but did not compete

Year	Artist	Song	Language	Final	Points	Semi	Points
1975	Semiha Yankı	"Seninle Bir Dakika"	Turkish	19 ◁	3	No semi-finals	
1978	Nilüfer and Nazar	"Sevince"	Turkish	18	2	No semi-finals	
1979	Maria Rita Epik and 21. Peron ◇	"Seviyorum" ◇	Turkish ◇	Withdrawn		No semi-finals	
1980	Ajda Pekkan	"Pet'r Oil"	Turkish	15	23	No semi-finals	
1981	Modern Folk Trio and Ayşegül	"Dönme Dolap"	Turkish	18	9	No semi-finals	
1982	Neco	"Hani?"	Turkish	15	20	No semi-finals	
1983	Çetin Alp and the Short Waves	"Opera"	Turkish	19 ◁	0	No semi-finals	
1984	Beş Yıl Önce, On Yıl Sonra	"Halay"	Turkish	12	37	No semi-finals	
1985	MFÖ	"Didai didai dai"	Turkish	14	36	No semi-finals	
1986	Klips ve Onlar	"Halley"	Turkish	9	53	No semi-finals	
1987	Seyyal Taner and Grup Lokomotif	"Şarkım Sevgi Üstüne"	Turkish	22 ◁	0	No semi-finals	
1988	MFÖ	"Sufi (Hey Ya Hey)"	Turkish	15	37	No semi-finals	
1989	Pan	"Bana Bana"	Turkish	21	5	No semi-finals	
1990	Kayahan	"Gözlerinin Hapsindeyim"	Turkish	17	21	No semi-finals	
1991	Can Uğurluer, Reyhan Karaca and İzel Çeliköz	"İki Dakika"	Turkish	12	44	No semi-finals	
1992	Aylin Vatankoş	"Yaz Bitti"	Turkish	19	17	No semi-finals	
1993	Burak Aydos, Öztürk Baybora and Serter	"Esmer Yarim"	Turkish	21	10	Kvalifikacija za Millstreet	
1995	Arzu Ece	"Sev!"	Turkish	16	21	No semi-finals	
1996	Şebnem Paker	"Beşinci Mevsim"	Turkish	12	57	7	69
1997	Şebnem Paker and Grup Etnik	"Dinle"	Turkish	3	121	No semi-finals	
1998	Tüzmen	"Unutamazsın"	Turkish	14	25	No semi-finals	
1999	Tuba Önal and Grup Mistik	"Dön Artık"	Turkish	16	21	No semi-finals	
2000	Pınar and the S.O.S.	"Yorgunum Anla"	Turkish, English	10	59	No semi-finals	
2001	Sedat Yüce	"Sevgiliye Son"	Turkish, English	11	41	No semi-finals	
2002	Buket Bengisu and Group Safir	"Leylaklar Soldu Kalbinde"	Turkish, English	16	29	No semi-finals	
2003	Sertab Erener	"Everyway That I Can"	English	1	167	No semi-finals	
2004	Athena	"For Real"	English	4	195	Host country	
2005	Gülseren and Shaman	"Rimi Rimi Ley"	Turkish	13	92	Top 12 in 2004 final (Note: According to the then-Eurovision rules, the top ten non-Big Four countries from the previous year along with the Big Four automatically qualified for the Grand Final without having to compete in semi-finals. For example, if Germany and France placed inside the top ten, the 11th and 12th spots were advanced to next year's Grand Final along with all countries ranked in the top ten.)	
2006	Sibel Tüzün	"Süper Star"	Turkish (Note: The song was performed entirely in Turkish in the semi-final, and with an English chorus in the final.)	11	91	8	91
2007	Kenan Doğulu	"Shake It Up Şekerim"	English	4	163	3	197
2008	Mor ve Ötesi	"Deli"	Turkish	7	138	7	85
2009	Hadise	"Düm Tek Tek"	English	4	177	2	172
2010	Manga	"We Could Be the Same"	English	2	170	1	118
2011	Yüksek Sadakat	"Live It Up"	English	Failed to qualify		13	47
2012	Can Bonomo	"Love Me Back"	English	7	112	5	80

=== Congratulations: 50 Years of the Eurovision Song Contest ===
Artist	Song	Language	At Congratulations				At Eurovision		
Artist	Song	Language	Final	Points	Semi	Points	Year	Place	Points
Sertab Erener	"Everyway That I Can"	English	Failed to qualify		9	104	2003	1	167

== Hostings ==
Year	Location	Venue	Presenters
2004	Istanbul	Abdi İpekçi Arena	Korhan Abay and Meltem Cumbul

== Awards ==
=== Marcel Bezençon Awards ===
Year	Category	Song	Performer	Final	Points	Host city
2003	Press Award	"Everyway That I Can"	Sertab Erener	1	167	(Latvia) Riga

== Conductors ==
Year	Conductor (Note: All conductors are of Turkish nationality unless otherwise noted.)	Notes	Ref.
1975	Timur Selçuk		
1978	Onno Tunç		
1979	Tuğrul Karataş ◇	(Note: Karataş was announced as the Turkish conductor prior to their withdrawal.)	
1980	Atilla Özdemiroğlu		
1981	Onno Tunç		
1982	Garo Mafyan		
1983	Buğra Uğur		
1984	Selçuk Başar		
1985	Garo Mafyan		
1986	Melih Kibar		
1987	Garo Mafyan		
1988	Turhan Yükseler		
1989	Timur Selçuk		
1990	Ümit Eroğlu		
1991	Turhan Yükseler		
1992	Aydın Özarı		
1993	No conductor		
1995	Melih Kibar		
1996	Levent Çoker		
1997	Levent Çoker		
1998	Ümit Eroğlu		

== Commentators and spokespersons ==
Prior to 2012 every contest Turkey had taken part in had always been commentated on by Turkish television presenter Bülend Özveren, with the exception of 1982–1986, 1990–1991, 1999–2002, and 2007. In addition Özveren also co-commentated the contest in 2004, 2011, and 2012. Out of the 38 years Turkey have broadcast the event Özveren has commentated on 29 of them making him nine years short of being the contest's longest commentator.

Year	Channel	Commentator	Spokesperson	Ref.
1973	TRT Televizyon	Unknown	Did not participate	
1974	TRT Televizyon	Unknown	Did not participate	
1975	TRT Televizyon	Unknown	Unknown	
1976	TRT Televizyon	Unknown	Did not participate	
1977	TRT Televizyon	Bülend Özveren	Did not participate	
1978	TRT Televizyon	Unknown	Meral Savcı	
1979	No broadcast		Did not participate	
1980	TRT Televizyon	Bülend Özveren	Unknown	
1981	TRT Televizyon	Unknown	Unknown	
1982	TRT Televizyon	Ümit Tunçağ	Unknown	
1983	TRT Televizyon	Unknown	Unknown	
1984	TRT Televizyon	Başak Doğru	Başak Doğru	
1985	TRT Televizyon	Başak Doğru	Unknown	
1986	TRT Televizyon	Gülgün Baysal	Unknown	
1987	TV1	Unknown	Unknown	
1988	TV1	Unknown	Unknown	
1989	TV1	Bülend Özveren	Unknown	
1990	TV1	Başak Doğru	Unknown	
1991	TV1	Unknown	Canan Kumbasar	
1992	TV1	Unknown	Korhan Abay	
1993	TRT 1	Bülend Özveren	Ömer Önder	
1994	TRT 1	Unknown	Did not participate	
1995	TRT 1	Unknown	Ömer Önder	
1996	TRT 1	Unknown	Ömer Önder	
1997	TRT 1, TRT Int	Unknown	Ömer Önder	
1998	TRT 1, TRT Int	Bülend Özveren	Osman Erkan	
1999	TRT 1, TRT Int	Gülşah Banda	Osman Erkan	
2000	TRT 1, TRT Int	Ömer Önder	Osman Erkan	
2001	TRT 1, TRT Int	Unknown	Meltem Ersan Yazgan	
2002	TRT 1	Ömer Önder	Meltem Ersan Yazgan	
2003	TRT 1, TRT Int	Bülend Özveren	Meltem Ersan Yazgan	
2004	TRT 1, TRT Int	Unknown	Meltem Ersan Yazgan	
2005	TRT 1	Unknown	Meltem Ersan Yazgan	
2006	TRT 1	Bülend Özveren	Meltem Ersan Yazgan	
2007	TRT 1	Unknown	Meltem Ersan Yazgan	
2007	TRT 1	Hakan Urgancı	Meltem Ersan Yazgan	
2008	TRT 1, TRT Int	Unknown	Meltem Ersan Yazgan	
2008	TRT Türk (Final)	Bülend Özveren	Meltem Ersan Yazgan	
2009	TRT 1	Unknown	Meltem Ersan Yazgan	
2010	TRT 1	Bülend Özveren	Meltem Ersan Yazgan	
2011	TRT 1	Bülend Özveren and Erhan Konuk	Ömer Önder	
2012	TRT 1, TRT HD, TRT Türk, TRT Müzik, TRT Avaz	Bülend Özveren and Erhan Konuk	Ömer Önder	
2013–2026	No broadcast		Did not participate	

== Photo gallery ==
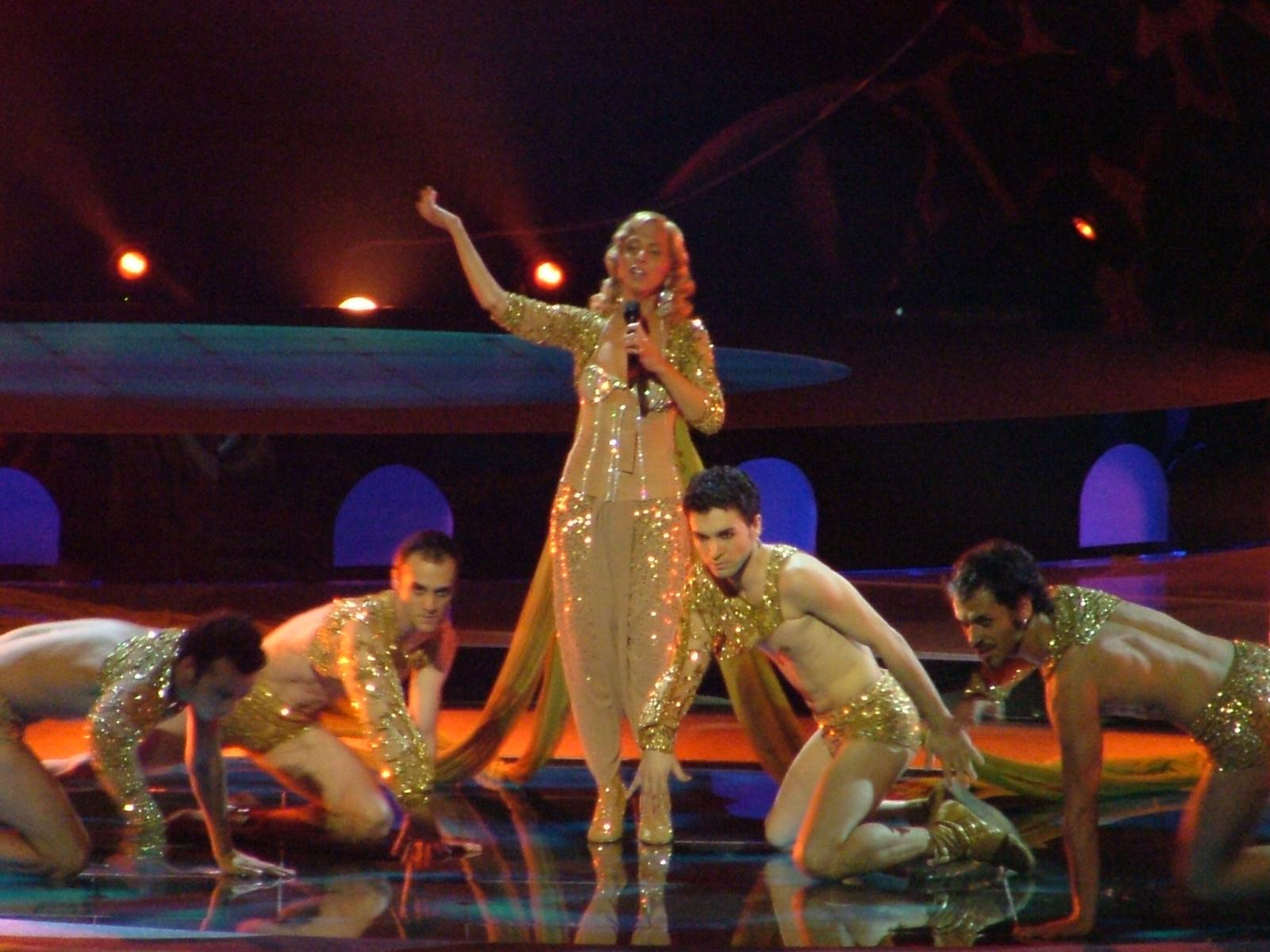
Sertab Erener in the opening of the 2004 contest.

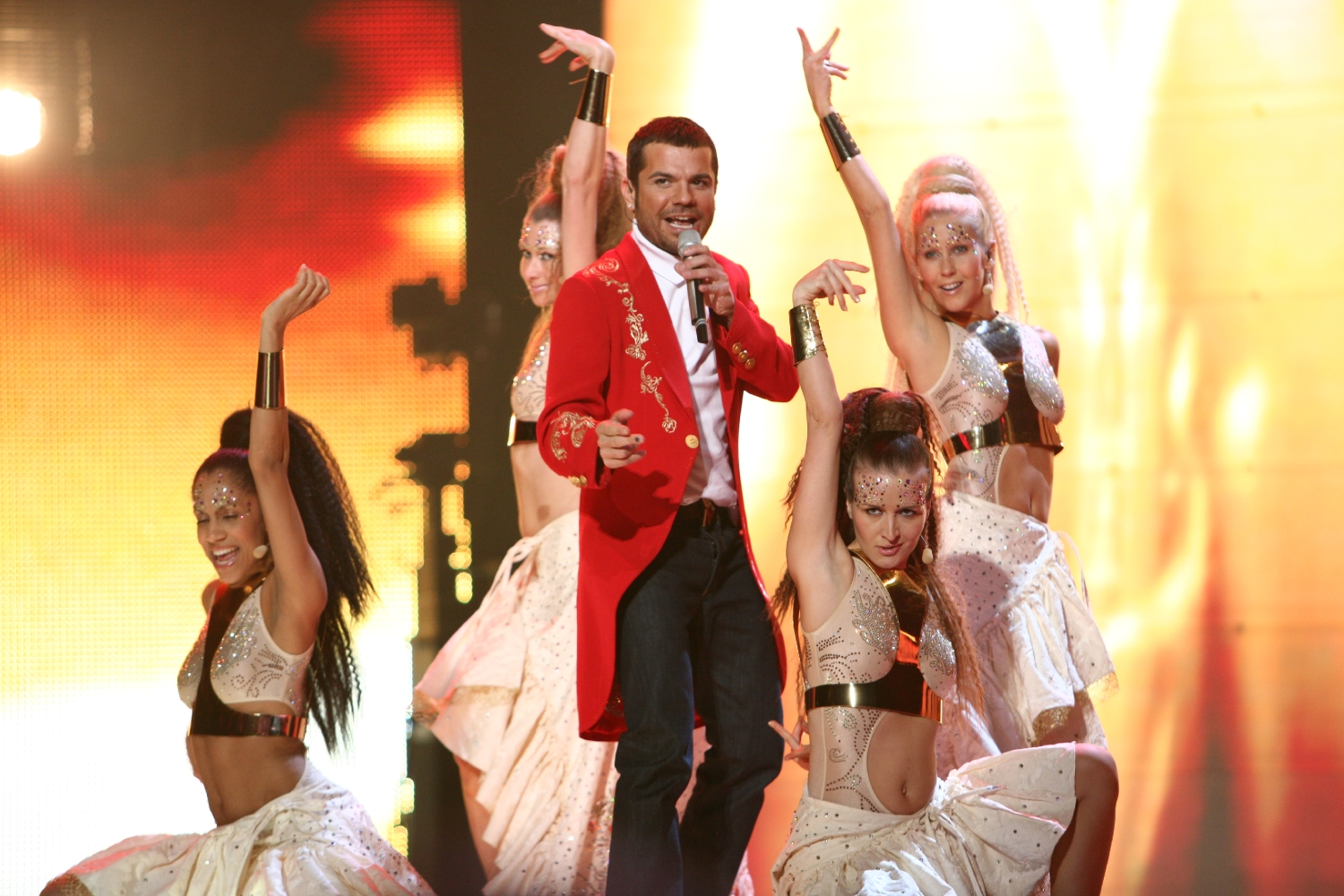
Kenan Doğulu in Helsinki (2007)

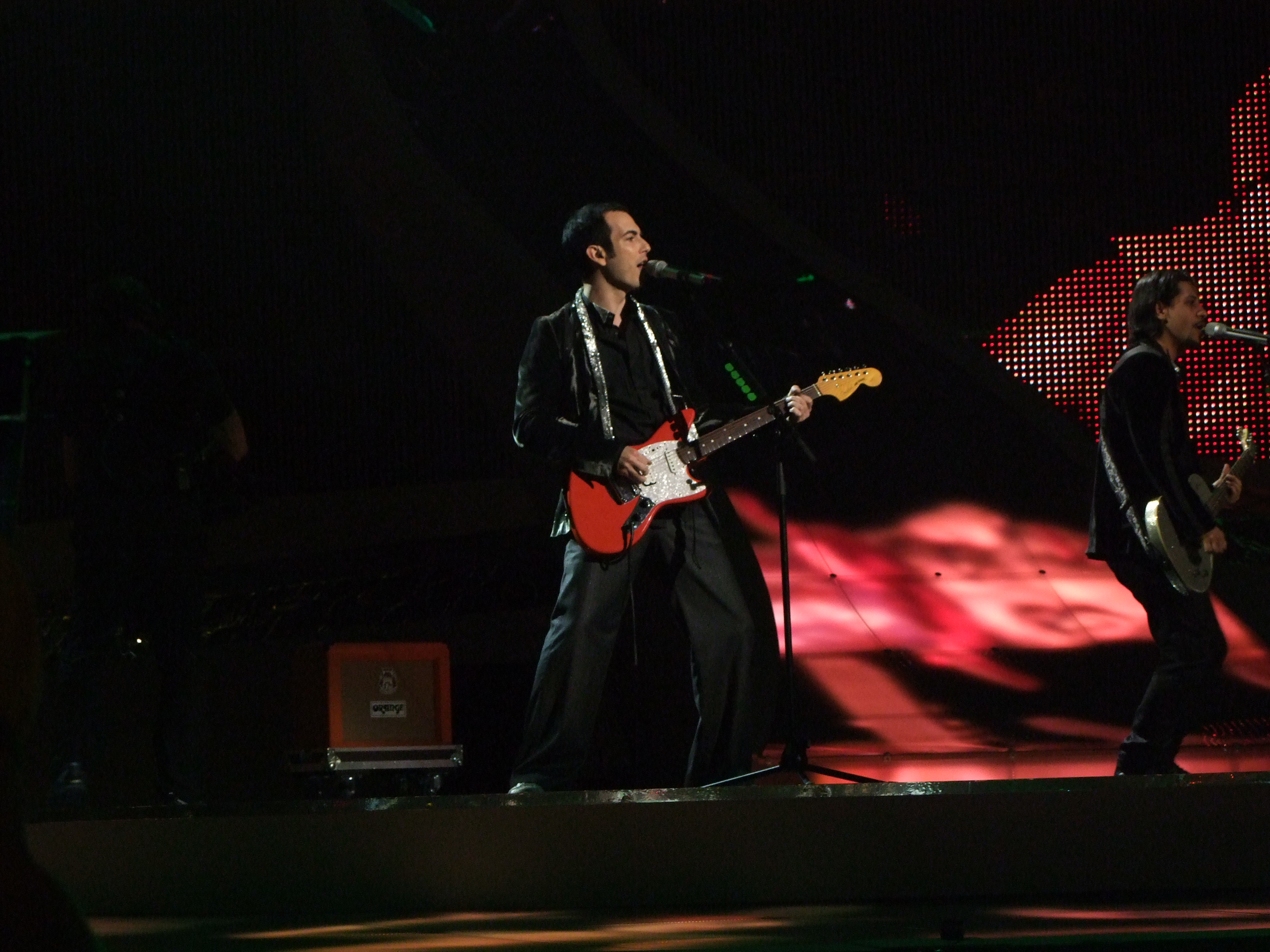
Mor ve Ötesi in Belgrade (2008)

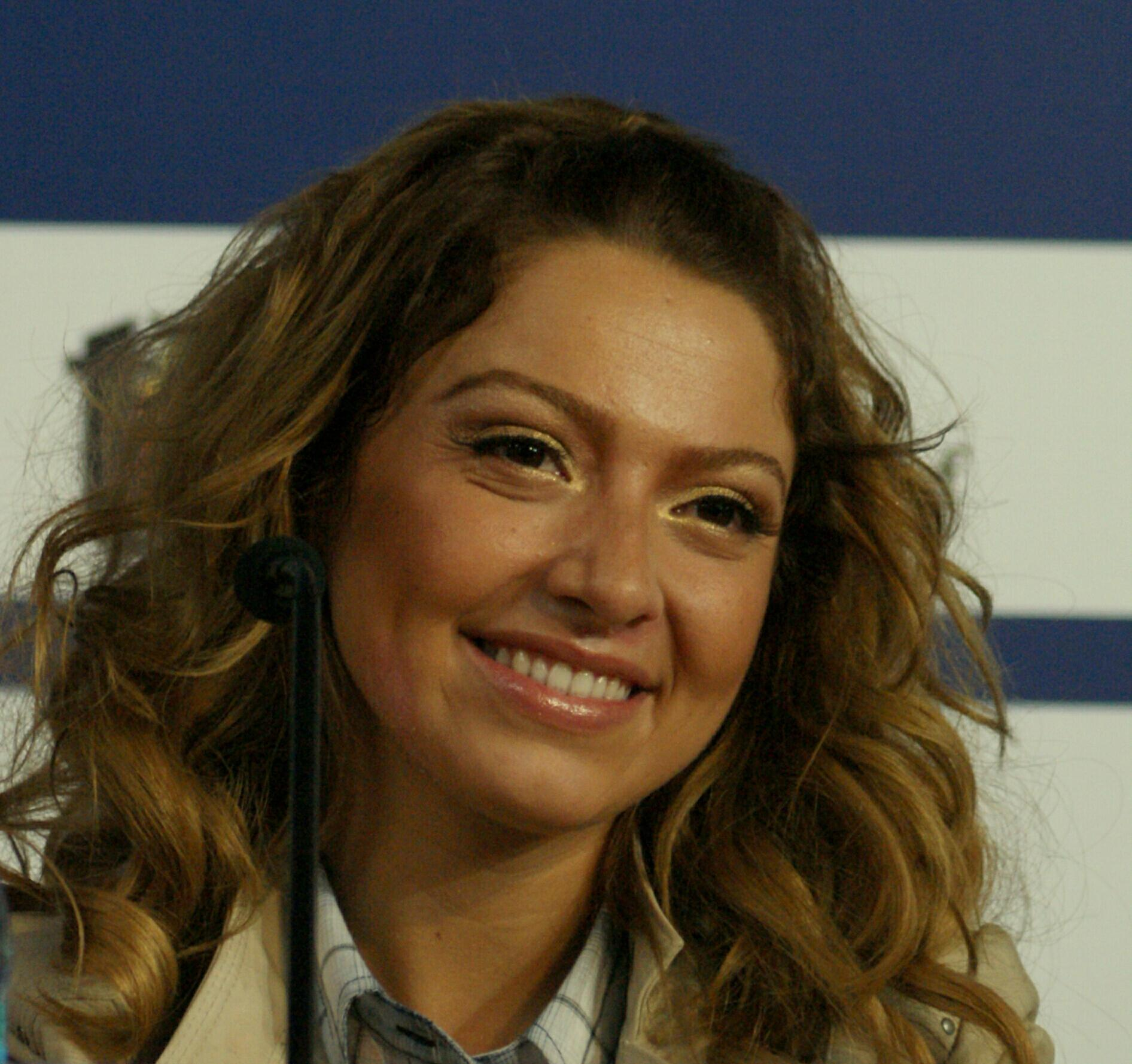
Hadise in Moscow (2009)

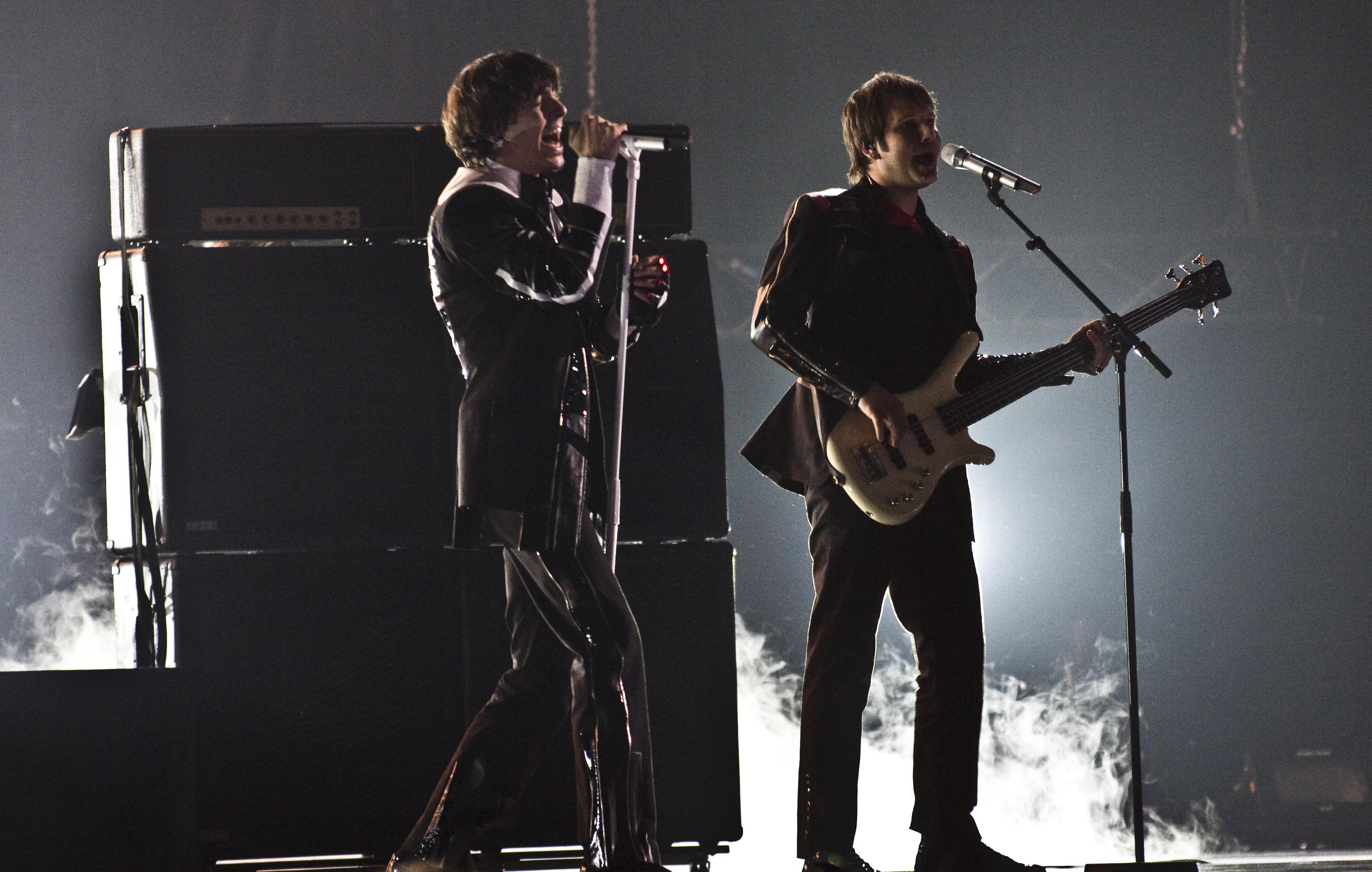
Manga in Oslo (2010)

== See also ==
- Music of Turkey
- Turkey in the ABU TV Song Festival
