= Şebnem Paker =

Turkish guitarist, singer and educator

- Born: 20 July 1977 (age 49); Istanbul, Turkey
- Genres: Pop, blues, folk
- Occupations: Music teacher, guitarist, singer
- Years active: 1996–present

Şebnem Paker (born 20 July 1977) is a Turkish guitarist, singer and music teacher. She represented Turkey at Eurovision Song Contest 1997, finishing third.

== Biography ==
Paker attended the Department of Classical Guitar at Istanbul University State Conservatory between 1992 and 1996. Later, she studied singing at Marmara University Music Department.

Paker represented Turkey in the Eurovision Song Contest 1996 and Eurovision Song Contest 1997. Her 1997 entry, "Dinle", composed by Levent Çoker and written by Mehtap Alnıtemiz, won third place. This was Turkey's best result in the contest until its first-place win in 2003. Now it remains as the third best results of all Turkish Eurovision history, only failing to maNga and Sertab Erener. Paker released her only album, also called Dinle, in August 1997.

In 1998, she once again competed in the national finals, organized by TRT, with the song "Çal". With its moving melody and embellished with ethnic Turkish instruments, it was an attempt to attract the attention of European audiences. Her goal was to achieve a more successful result at the Eurovision Song Contest each year, however the song was not chosen to represent Turkey at the contest that year.

Paker graduated from Marmara University Music Education Singing Department in 2000. She has been working as a music teacher since 2004, after working for 4 years in private educational institutions affiliated to the Ministry of National Education. She taught music at Avni Akyol Fine Arts High School in Istanbul until 2018; since then, she has been employed at the Aydın Doğan Fine Arts High School. She also coauthored a textbook to be used in art high schools in Turkey.

Paker has been married to Soner Odabaş since 22 September 2012. Together they have two children. On 26 August 2023 Şebnem made headlines after it was announced that she was hired as the music teacher for a school in Milas, Muğla.

Awards and achievements
Preceded by Arzu Ece with "Sev"	Turkey in the Eurovision Song Contest; 1996, 1997	Succeeded by Tüzmen with "Unutamazsın"
