= Antonio Carbonell =

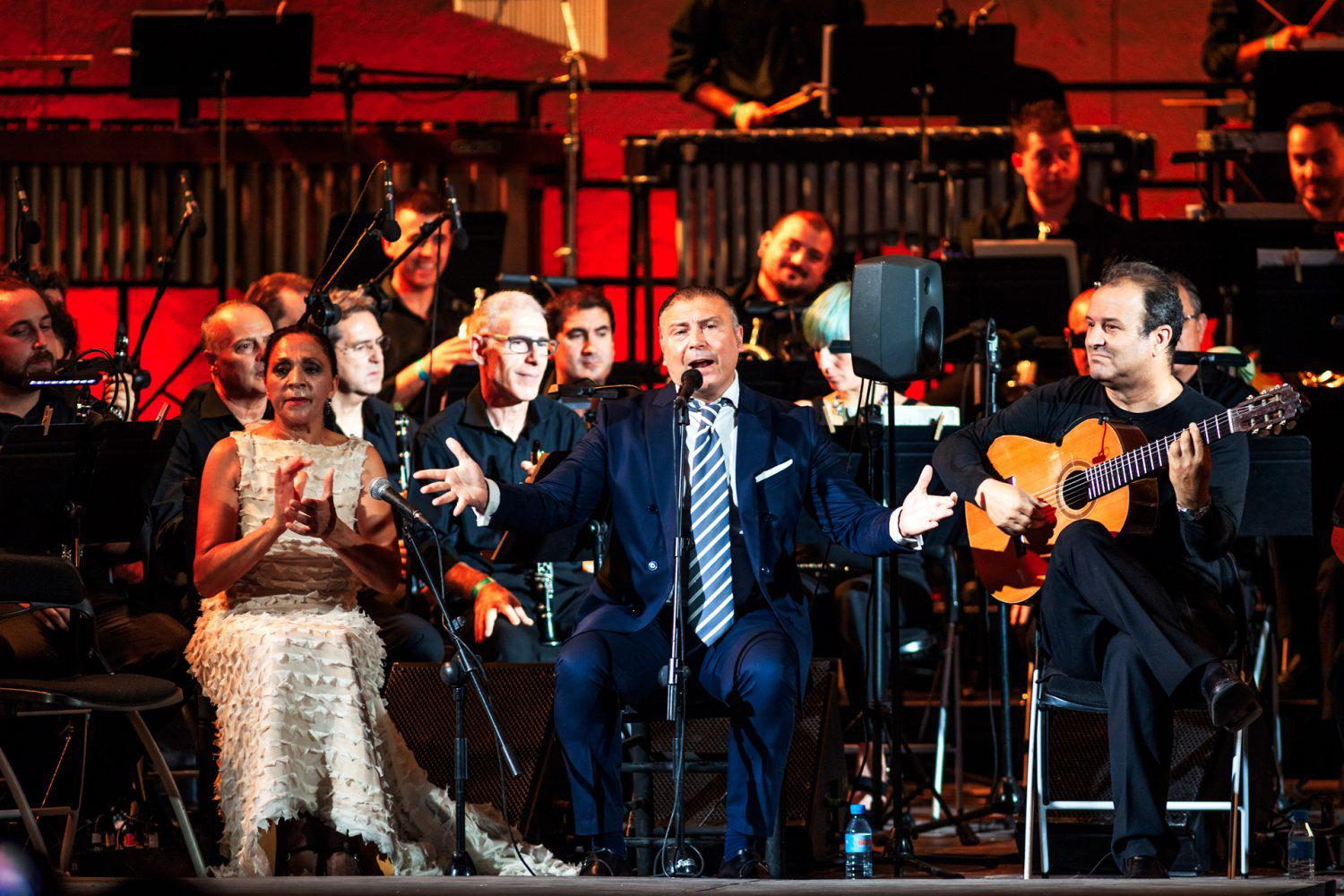
- Antonio Carbonell performance in Madrid in 2018

Background information
- Born: Antonio Carbonell Muñoz; 21 August 1969 (age 57); Madrid, Spain
- Occupation: Singer

Antonio Carbonell Muñoz (born 21 August 1969 in Madrid) is a Spanish singer-songwriter of Romani heritage, known for his participation in the 1996 Eurovision Song Contest.

He belongs to a family involved in flamenco music: he's the son of singer of cante Montoyita, and he is cousin to the members of the popular flamenco-pop band Ketama. He has collaborated with important flamenco artists such as Enrique Morente and Manolo Sanlúcar.

His first album, Ilusiones, had a modest reception. Later, when he was internally chosen by Televisión Española as the Spanish representative for the 41st Eurovision Song Contest, he published his second album, ¡Ay, Qué Deseo!. With the homonym song, he received a rather poor result at the contest (20th out of 23 countries).

Apart from his two solo albums, he has contributed to a number of flamenco compilation albums: Cante Gitano, Directo Desde Casa Patas, Esencias Flamencas and Lo Mejor Que Tengo.

Awards and achievements
Preceded by Anabel Conde with "Vuelve conmigo"	Spain in the Eurovision Song Contest; 1996	Succeeded by Marcos Llunas with "Sin rencor"
