= Bülend Özveren =

Turkish television presenter (1943–2022)

- Born: 19 August 1941; Istanbul, Turkey
- Died: 18 October 2022 (aged 79); Istanbul, Turkey
- Education: Law
- Alma mater: Istanbul University
- Occupations: Television presenter, sports commentator

Bülend Özveren (19 August 1941 – 18 October 2022) was a Turkish television presenter and sports commentator.

== Biography ==
Özveren completed his secondary education at Lycée Saint-Benoît d'Istanbul (Istanbul) and higher education at Galatasaray High School. He graduated from Istanbul University, faculty of Law.

Özveren started working at TRT on 31 July 1965, first as a television presenter before becoming the sports commentator in 1972.

From 1973 to 2012, he intermittently served as the Turkish commentator for the Eurovision Song Contest. Özveren spoke English, Japanese, Spanish and French, as well as his native Turkish.

Özveren died on 18 October 2022 in Istanbul at the age of 79, due to heart failure.

Media offices
Preceded by First	Eurovision Song Contest Turkish Commentator; 1973–1981	Succeeded by Ümit Tunçağ
Preceded by Başak Doğru	Eurovision Song Contest Turkish Commentator; 1986–1989	Succeeded by Başak Doğru
Preceded by Başak Doğru	Eurovision Song Contest Turkish Commentator; 1992–1997	Succeeded by Ömer Önder
Preceded by Ömer Önder	Eurovision Song Contest Turkish Commentator; 2002–2012	Succeeded by Last
