= Spain in the Eurovision Song Contest 1996 =

- Eurovision Song Contest 1996
- Participating broadcaster: Televisión Española (TVE)
- Country: Spain
- Selection process: Internal selection
- Announcement date: 18 April 1996

Competing entry
- Song: "¡Ay, qué deseo!"
- Artist: Antonio Carbonell
- Songwriters: Antonio Carmona; José Miguel Carmona; Juan Carmona

Placement
- Final result: 20th, 17 points

Participation chronology

Spain was represented at the Eurovision Song Contest 1996 with the song "¡Ay, qué deseo!", written by Antonio Carmona, José Miguel Carmona, and Juan Carmona, and performed by Antonio Carbonell. The Spanish participating broadcaster, Televisión Española (TVE), internally selected its entry for the contest. The song, performed in position 3, placed twentieth out of twenty-three competing entries with 17 points.

== Before Eurovision ==
Televisión Española (TVE) internally selected "¡Ay, qué deseo!" performed by Antonio Carbonell as its entry for the Eurovision Song Contest 1996. The song was written by Antonio Carmona, José Miguel Carmona, and Juan Carmona, the members of the new flamenco band Ketama. The song was presented on 18 April 1996.

== At Eurovision ==
All entries with the exception of that from the host country, Norway, were required to qualify from an audio qualifying round, held on 20 and 21 March 1996, in order to compete in the Eurovision Song Contest 1996; the top twenty-two entries from the qualifying round progressed to the final. "¡Ay, qué deseo!" placed 14th with 43 points thus qualifying for the final.

On 18 May 1996, the Eurovision Song Contest final was held at the Oslo Spektrum in Oslo hosted by Norsk rikskringkasting (NRK) and broadcast live throughout the continent. Carbonell performed "¡Ay, qué deseo!" third in the running order, following the United Kingdom and preceding Portugal. He was accompanied on stage by Las Chamorro –Irene and Consuelo Delgado– as backing singers, and by Javier Catalá, Julio Jiménez, and Jesús Fernández as backing musicians. In his video presentation postcard he received a good luck message from Alberto Escudero Claramunt, the Spanish Ambassador to Norway. Eduardo Leiva conducted the event's orchestra performance of the Spanish entry. At the close of the voting "¡Ay, qué deseo!" received 17 points, placing 20th of 23 entries.

TVE broadcast the contest in Spain on La Primera with commentary by José Luis Uribarri. Before the event, TVE aired a talk show hosted by Concha Galán introducing the Spanish jury, which continued after the contest commenting on the results.

=== Voting ===
==== Qualifying round ====
Points awarded to Spain (Qualifying round)
Score	Country
12 points	
10 points	
8 points	Croatia; Malta; Slovakia
7 points	
6 points	
5 points	
4 points	Cyprus; Greece; Slovenia; Turkey
3 points	
2 points	Austria
1 point	Romania

Points awarded by Spain (Qualifying round)
Score	Country
12 points	Malta
10 points	Turkey
8 points	Belgium
7 points	Greece
6 points	Slovakia
5 points	Austria
4 points	Cyprus
3 points	Bosnia and Herzegovina
2 points	Ireland
1 point	Croatia

==== Final ====
TVE assembled a jury panel with sixteen members. The following members comprised the Spanish jury:

- Montserrat Marial – businesswoman
- Manuel Redondo – makeup artist and gemologist
- Juan Diego – teacher and psychologist
- Mabel Alfonso – singer-songwriter
- Elvira Quintillá – actress
- Antonio Pinilla – student
- Álvaro de Luna – actor
- Adriana Vega – actress
- Mónica Pont – actress
- Pedro Bermúdez 'Azuquita' – singer
- Mikel Herzog – singer
- Asunción Embuena – actress and television presenter
- María Mayor – model
- José Sancho – actor
- Chema Purón – songwriter
- Anabel Conde – singer, represented Spain in 1995

The jury was chaired by José Visuña, Head of Musical Policy at TVE, with Belén Fernández de Henestrosa as spokesperson. These did not have the right to vote, but the president decided in the event of a tie. The jury awarded its maximum of 12 points to Belgium.

Points awarded to Spain (Final)
Score	Country
12 points	
10 points	
8 points	
7 points	
6 points	Greece
5 points	Malta
4 points	Croatia
3 points	
2 points	Cyprus
1 point	

Points awarded by Spain (Final)
Score	Country
12 points	Belgium
10 points	Malta
8 points	Turkey
7 points	Cyprus
6 points	Netherlands
5 points	Croatia
4 points	Estonia
3 points	Iceland
2 points	Slovakia
1 point	Slovenia
