= Russia in the Eurovision Song Contest 1997 =

- Eurovision Song Contest 1997
- Country: Russia
- Selection process: Internal selection
- Announcement date: Artist: 23 March 1997; Song: 2 April 1997

Competing entry
- Song: "Primadonna"
- Artist: Alla Pugacheva
- Songwriter: Alla Pugacheva

Placement
- Final result: 15th, 33 points

Participation chronology

Russia was represented at the Eurovision Song Contest 1997 with the song "Primadonna", written and performed by Alla Pugacheva. The Russian entry was selected internally by the Russian broadcaster Obshchestvennoye Rossiyskoye Televideniye (ORT). At the contest, Russia placed 15th and scored 33 points.

== Background ==
Prior to the 1997 contest, Russia had participated in the Eurovision Song Contest 2 times since its first entry in 1994. Russia then participated yearly, only missing the 1996 contest when its selected song "Ya eto ya" by Andrey Kosinsky failed to qualify for the contest, due to the fact that entry scored an insufficient number of points in a special qualifying round. To this point, the country's best placing was ninth, which it achieved in 1994 with the song "Vechny strannik" performed by Youddiph. Russia's least successful result was in 1995 when it placed 17th with the song "Kolybelnaya dlya vulkana" by Philipp Kirkorov, receiving 17 points in total.

The Russian participation in the contest alternates between two broadcasters: RTR and ORT. The Russian broadcaster for the 1997 contest, who broadcasts the event in Russia and organises the selection process for its entry, was ORT. ORT confirmed its intentions to participate in the Eurovision Song Contest 1997 on 20 January 1997. Along with their participation confirmation, the broadcaster also announced that the Russian entry for the 1997 contest would be selected internally and that ORT would collaborate with broadcaster RTR in order to organise a selection process for the Russian entry.

== Before Eurovision ==
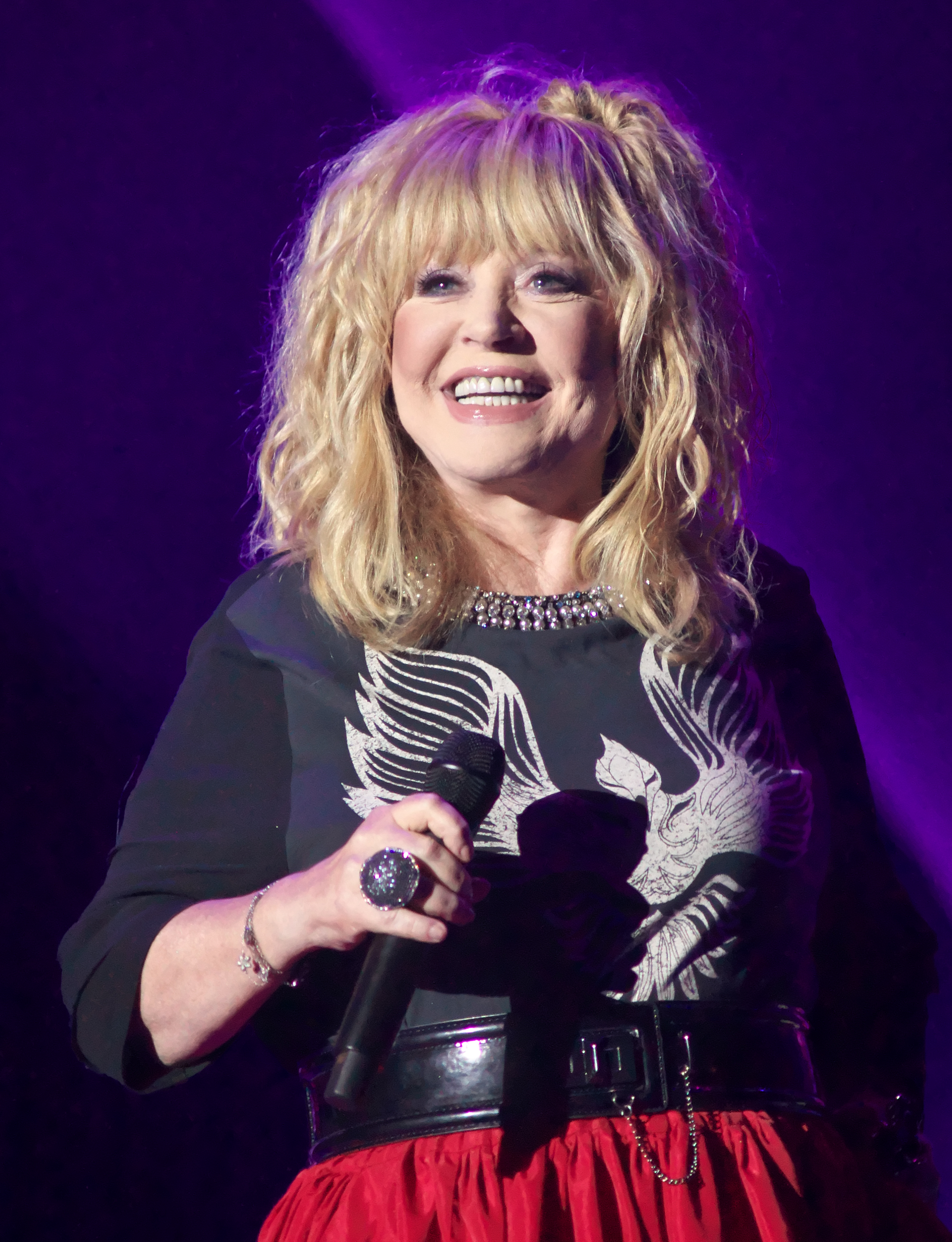
Alla Pugacheva (pictured in 2016) was selected to represent Russia in the Eurovision Song Contest 1997

=== Internal selection ===
On 20 January 1997, ORT opened the submission period for interested artists and composers to submit their songs until 14 February 1997. At the conclusion of the deadline, the broadcaster received 53 submissions, including entries from Nogu Svelo!, Zhanna Dobrovolskaya and Andrey Kosinsky. A jury panel selected the Russian entry from the received submissions. The jury consisted of Yury Saulsky, Maksim Dunaevsky, Alexander Kutikov, Yuri Aksyuta and Sergey Arhipov.

On 23 March 1997, ORT announced that they had internally selected Alla Pugacheva to represent Russia in the Eurovision Song Contest 1997. The selected song, entitled "Primadonna", was presented to the public on 2 April 1997 through the release of the official music video, directed by Fyodor Bondarchuk. The head of the jury, Konstantin Ernst, later revealed that second place went to the song "Angel" performed by the duo Chay Vdvoyom.

=== Promotion ===
In order to promote the Russian entry, Pugacheva's promotional activities for the entry saw her performing during ORT's TV show "Syurpriz dlya Ally" on 15 April, and in Fellini club in Moscow also on 15 April, in the lead up to the contest. In addition to the promotional performances, a CD single and music video for "Primadonna" were released.

== At Eurovision ==
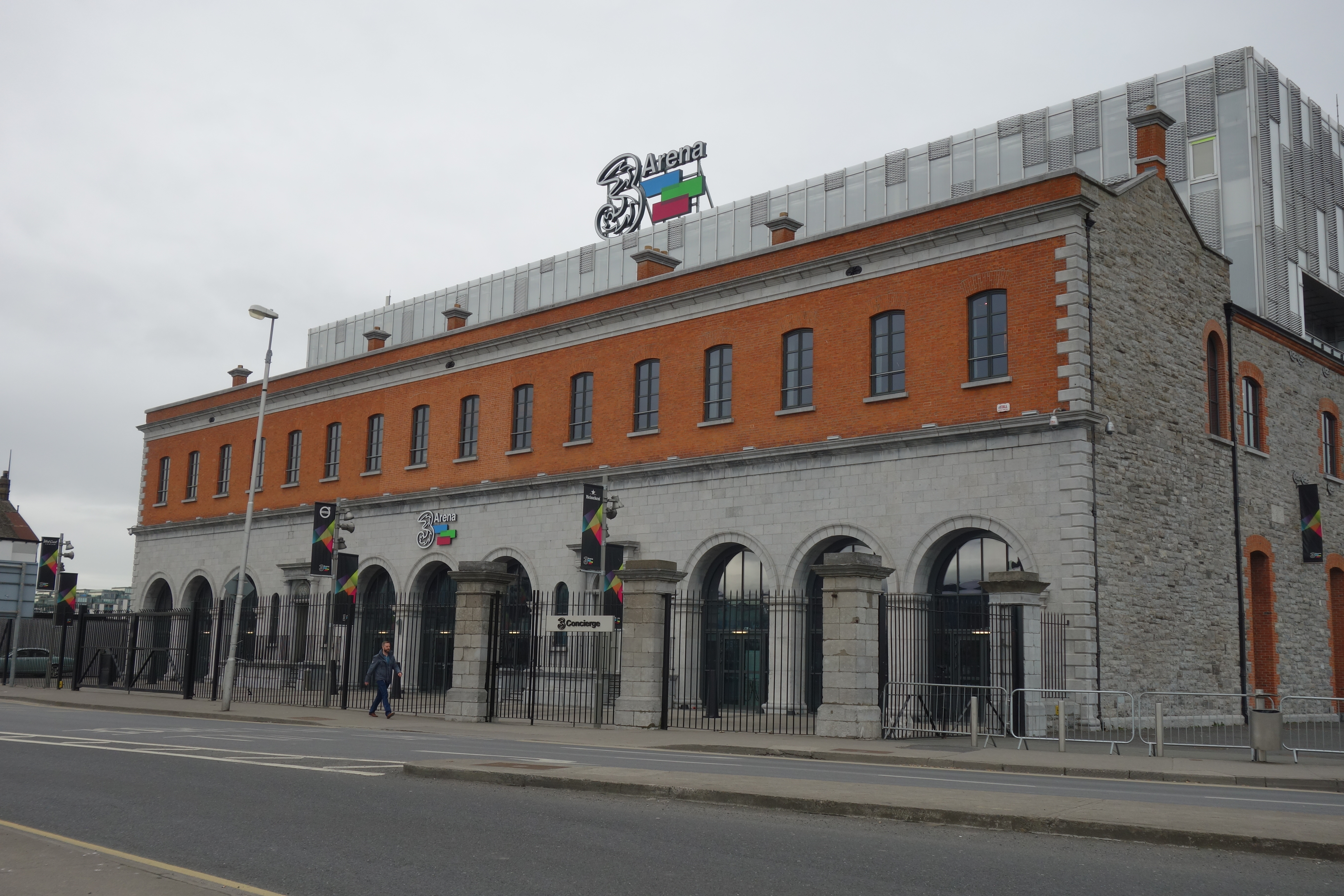
Eurovision Song Contest 1997 took place at the Point Theatre in Dublin, Ireland, on 3 May 1997.

The Eurovision Song Contest 1997 took place at the Point Theatre in Dublin, Ireland, on 3 May 1997. According to the Eurovision rules, the 25-country participant list for the contest was composed of: the previous year's winning country and host nation Ireland, and the twenty-four countries which had the highest average points total over the preceding four contests. As Russia was one of the 24 countries with the highest average scores, it was thus permitted to participate. The running order for the contest was decided by a draw held on 28 November 1996; Russia was assigned to perform 20th at the 1997 contest, following Hungary and preceding Denmark. After the voting concluded, Russia scored 33 points, including one set of highest score of 12 points, from Slovenia. and placed 15th.

The contest was televised in Russia on ORT and featured commentary by Sergey Antipov and 1995 Russian Eurovision representative Philipp Kirkorov. The Russian conductor at the contest was a Swedish musician and bass guitarist Rutger Gunnarsson.

=== Voting ===
The same voting system in use since 1975 was again implemented for 1997 contest, with each country providing 1–8, 10 and 12 points to the ten highest-ranking songs as determined by a jury, with countries not allowed to vote for themselves. A 16-member jury panel determined which countries would receive Russia's points. The Russian spokesperson, who announced the points awarded by the Russian jury during the final, was Arina Sharapova.

Points awarded to Russia
Score	Country
12 points	Slovenia
10 points	
8 points	Netherlands
7 points	Estonia
6 points	
5 points	Austria
4 points	
3 points	
2 points	
1 point	Norway

Points awarded by Russia
Score	Country
12 points	United Kingdom
10 points	Slovenia
8 points	Spain
7 points	Italy
6 points	France
5 points	Ireland
4 points	Turkey
3 points	Austria
2 points	Greece
1 point	Cyprus
