= Anabel Conde =

Spanish singer

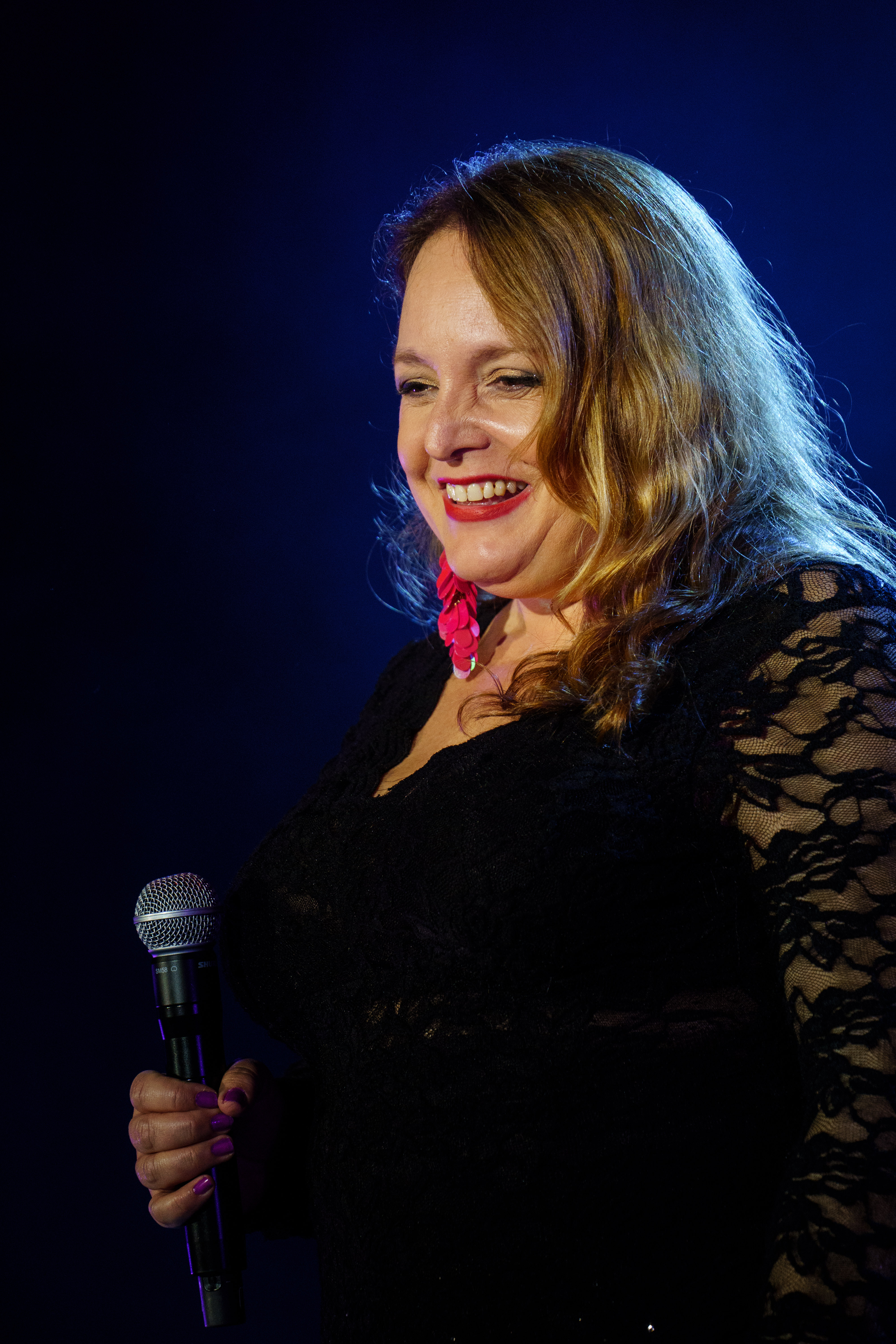

Background information
- Born: Ana Isabel Conde Sánchez; 16 June 1975 (age 51); Fuengirola (Málaga), Spain
- Occupation: Singer
- Website: anabelconde.es

Ana Isabel Conde Sánchez (born 16 June 1975 in Fuengirola, Málaga), better known as Anabel Conde, is a Spanish singer.

She was chosen by Televisión Española to represent Spain in Eurovision Song Contest 1995, on 13 May in Dublin (Ireland). Anabel performed the song "Vuelve conmigo", written by Chema Purón, finishing in second place after the Norwegian entry. She achieved the best position of Spain in Eurovision since 1979. Anabel Conde received 119 points.

After her big success in Eurovision 1995, Anabel withdrew from the profession because of troubles with Jercar, her record label. However, the town of Fuengirola named a square in her honour.

In 2000 she participated in the Spanish national final for the Eurovision Song Contest 2000 in a duet with David Domínguez, performing the song "Ni colores ni fronteras". They finished in fourth place in the national final. In 2005, she returned to Eurovision as a backing singer for the Andorran entrant Marian van de Wal. The next year, she tried to enter for Poland in a duet with her sister Cristina, but failed.

In 2010, she submitted a song to Tu país te necesita, the Spanish selection process for the Eurovision Song Contest 2010. The song was called "Sin miedos". She finished in eighth place in the national final.

Preceded by Alejandro Abad with "Ella no es ella"	Spain in the Eurovision Song Contest; 1995	Succeeded by Antonio Carbonell with "¡Ay, qué deseo!"
