= Tarkan Tüzmen =

Turkish singer and actor

- Born: 7 March 1968 (age 58); Ankara, Turkey
- Occupations: Singer, actor
- Instrument: Vocals

Tarkan Tüzmen (born 7 March 1968), known professionally as Tüzmen, is a Turkish singer and actor, known for being a representative for Turkey in the Eurovision Song Contest 1998, and being the brother of former minister for Turkey Kürşad Tüzmen.

== Professional career ==
Tüzmen attempted to represent his home country of Turkey three times: Once in 1996 with the songs "Bilirsin ya", which did not receive a rank, and Var mısın söyle, a duo with Pınar Ayhan, then Pınar Karakoç, and came in second. The second time was in 1997 in a duo with Elçin Engin, called Şarkı, and did not receive a rank again. The third and final time was in 1998 with the song "Unutamazsın", and won the national final. He went to the contest in Birmingham and came in 14th place with 25 points.

He started his acting career since 2005 by portraying Alper in the TV show, Valley of the Wolves: Ambush.

== Discography ==
- t1 (1996)
- t2 (2003)

Awards and achievements
Preceded by Şebnem Paker & Grup Etnik with "Dinle"	Turkey in the Eurovision Song Contest; 1998	Succeeded by Tuba Önal & Group Mistik with "Dön Artık"
