= Eurovision Song Contest 1997 =

International song competition

Date and venue
- Final: 3 May 1997
- Venue: Point Theatre; Dublin, Ireland

Organisation
- Organiser: European Broadcasting Union (EBU)
- Scrutineer: Marie-Claire Vionnet

Production
- Host broadcaster: Radio Telefís Éireann (RTÉ)
- Director: Ian McGarry
- Executive producer: Noel Curran
- Musical director: Frank McNamara
- Presenters: Carrie Crowley; Ronan Keating

Participants
- Number of entries: 25
- Returning countries: Denmark; Germany; Hungary; Italy; Russia
- Non-returning countries: Belgium; Finland; Slovakia
- Participation map: Competing countries Relegated countries unable to participate due to poor results in previous contests Countries that participated in the past but not in 1997

Vote
- Voting system: Each country awarded 12, 10, 8–1 points to their ten favourite songs
- Winning song: United Kingdom; "Love Shine a Light"

The Eurovision Song Contest 1997 was the 42nd edition of the Eurovision Song Contest, held on 3 May 1997 at the Point Theatre in Dublin, Ireland, and presented by Carrie Crowley and Ronan Keating. It was organised by the European Broadcasting Union (EBU) and host broadcaster Radio Telefís Éireann (RTÉ), who staged the event after winning the 1996 contest for Ireland with the song "The Voice" by Eimear Quinn. The 1997 contest was the seventh – and to date last – edition to be staged in Ireland, as well as the fourth to be produced by RTÉ in five years. The Point Theatre served as the host venue for the third time, following the 1994 and 1995 contests, becoming the only venue to have been the site of three Eurovision Song Contests.

Broadcasters from twenty-five countries participated in the contest, with a new relegation system introduced to determine which could participate, based on each country's average points total in previous contests. Italy made its first appearance since 1993, and Denmark, Germany, Hungary, and Russia returned after last competing in 1995, having been prevented from competing the previous year after failing to progress from that event's qualifying round. Belgium, Finland, and Slovakia, participants in the previous year's contest, were unable to return after being excluded by the new relegation rules.

The winner was the United Kingdom with the song "Love Shine a Light", written by Kimberley Rew and performed by Katrina and the Waves. Ireland, Turkey, Italy, and Cyprus rounded out the top five, with Ireland earning its fifth placing in the top two within six years, Turkey achieving their best result to date, and Cyprus equalling its best result from 1982. Five of the competing countries used televoting to determine their points, allowing the general viewing public a say in the results for the first time; following this successful trial all countries were encouraged to use this system starting from the following year's event. Entries were also permitted for the first time to feature no live music accompaniment, with each performance being able to use only a backing track rather than utilising any part of the orchestra or any live instrumentation from the performers themselves.

The 1997 event would prove to be a watershed for the contest, with many aspects of this event leaving a lasting impact on future editions of Eurovision. These included: the first openly LGBT artist, Iceland's Paul Oscar, selected to compete in the event; changes to contest rules led to the abandonment of live musical accompaniment in future events; a successful trial of televoting in five countries led to widespread adoption for all countries in 1998.

== Location ==
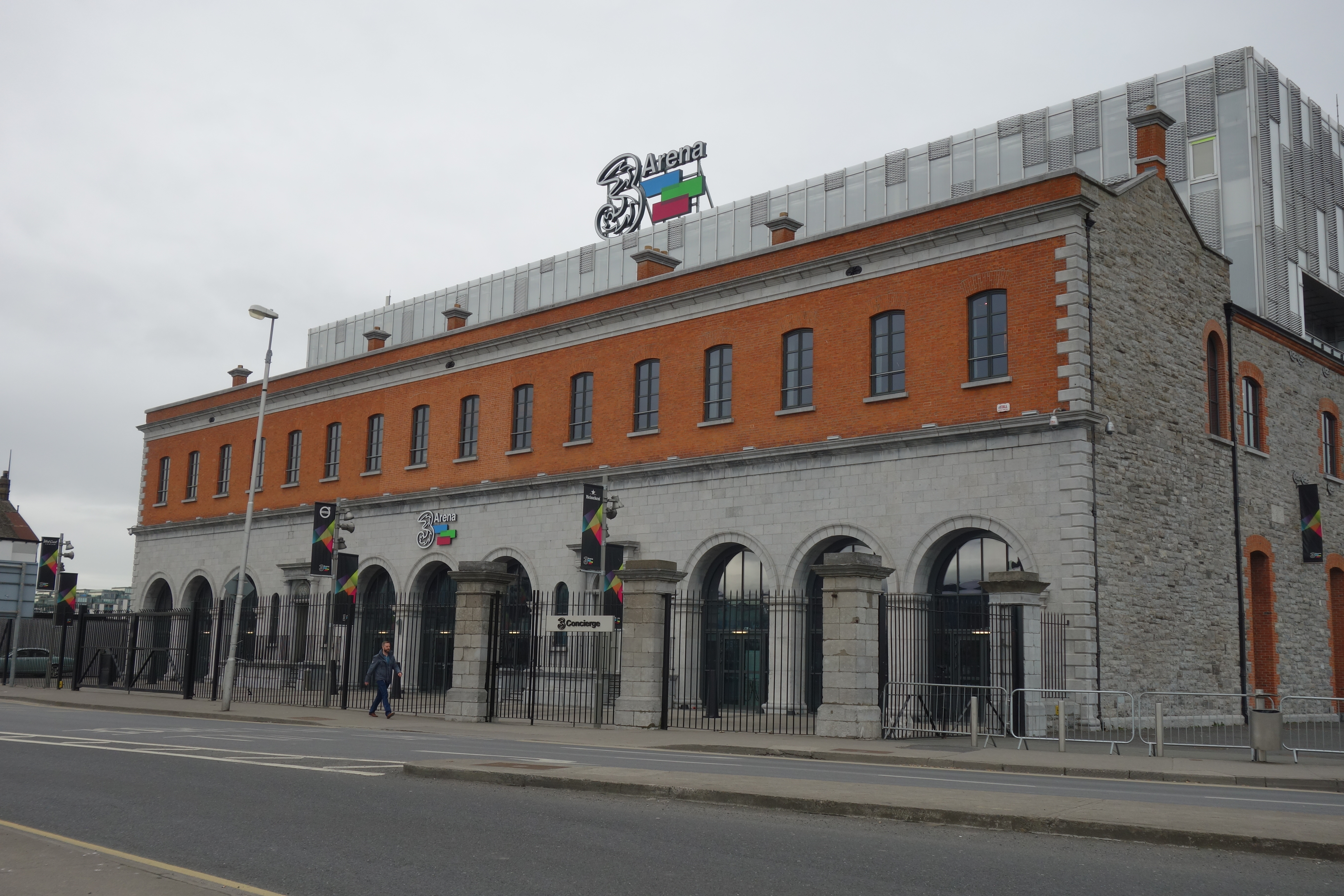
Point Theatre, Dublin – host venue of the 1997 contest (pictured following redevelopment)

The 1997 contest took place in Dublin, Ireland, following the country's victory at the 1996 edition with the song "The Voice", performed by Eimear Quinn. It was the seventh time that Ireland had hosted the contest, having previously staged the event in 1971, 1981, 1988, 1993, 1994, and 1995, with all previous events held in Dublin except the 1993 contest which was held in Millstreet. This was the fourth edition of the contest that Ireland had hosted within five years, and with this edition Ireland equalled the record for the nation which had staged the most contests, originally set by the United Kingdom in 1982.

Given the financial impact to staging the contest for a fourth time in five years, there was early speculation following its win in the 1996 contest that Radio Telefís Éireann (RTÉ) might stage the event as a co-production with BBC Northern Ireland. Another possibility that was brought up was hosting the contest in the Sydney Opera House in Australia in collaboration with SBS. Ultimately, the Irish broadcaster decided to organise the event on its own once again. The selected venue was the Point Theatre, a concert and events venue located amongst the Dublin Docklands which had originally been built as a train depot to serve the nearby port. Opened as a music venue in 1988, it was closed for redevelopment and expansion in 2008 and is now known as the 3Arena. The venue had previously hosted the 1994 and 1995 contests, and with this staging it became the only venue to have hosted three Eurovision Song Contests.

== Participants ==
Eurovision Song Contest 1997 – Participation summaries by country
- Austria; Bosnia and Herzegovina; Croatia; Cyprus; Denmark; Estonia; France; Germany; Greece; Hungary; Iceland; Ireland; Italy; Malta; Netherlands; Norway; Poland; Portugal; Russia; Slovenia; Spain; Sweden; Switzerland; Turkey; United Kingdom

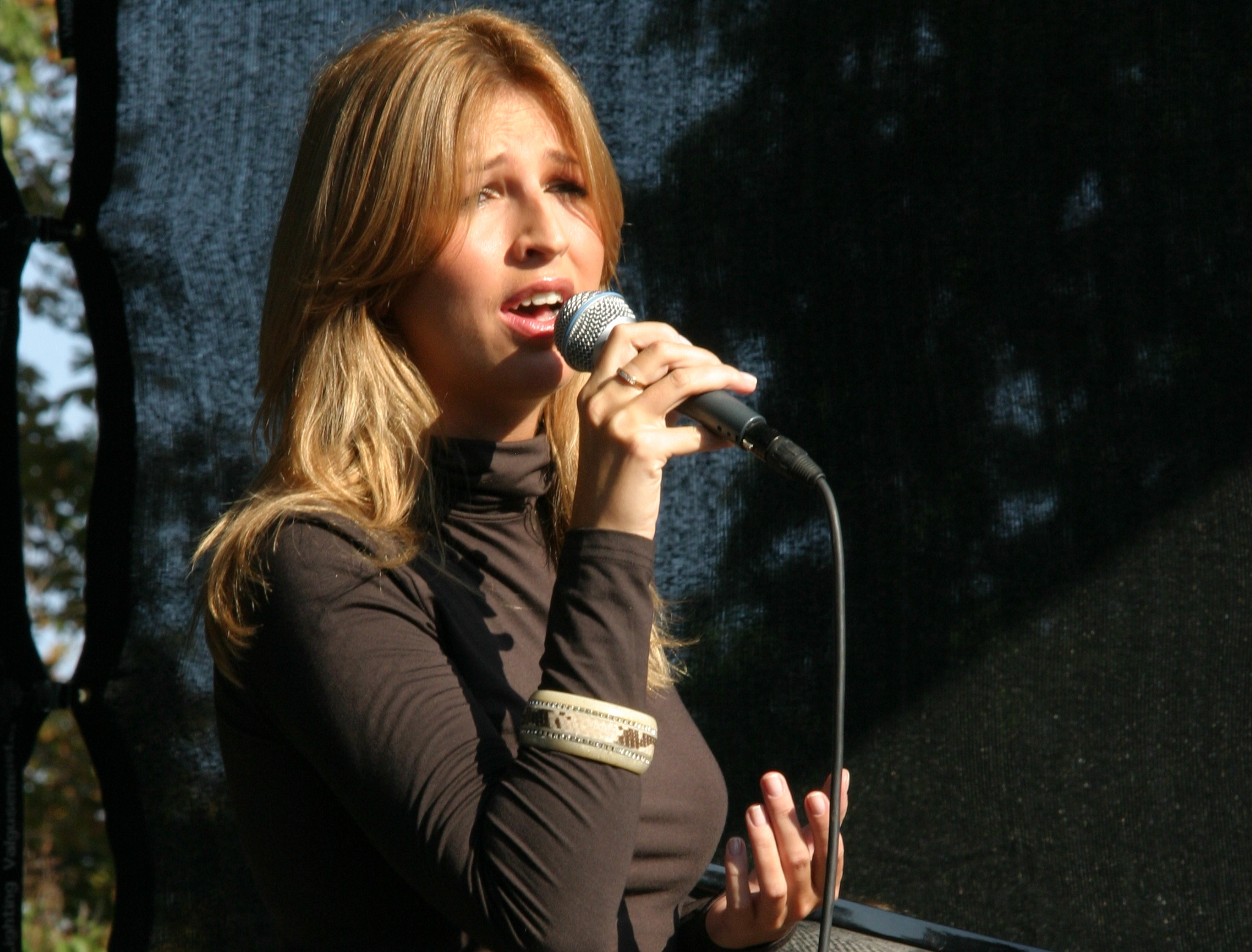
Maarja-Liis Ilus (pictured in 2006) represented Estonia in the contest for a second consecutive year.

Per the rules of the contest twenty-five countries were allowed to participate in the event. Denmark, Germany, Hungary, and Russia made a return to the contest after failing to progress from the qualifying round in the previous year's contest, and Italy returned after last competing in 1993. Conversely Belgium, Finland, and Slovakia, participants in the 1996 contest, were relegated and prevented from participating in this year's event.

Three representatives who had previously performed as lead artists in the contest competed again at this year's event. Two artists represented their country for a second consecutive year, with Şebnem Paker having represented Turkey in 1996, and Maarja-Liis Ilus, after having represented Estonia in 1996 with Ivo Linna, competing as a solo artist. Alma Čardžić also made a second appearance in the contest, having previously represented Bosnia and Herzegovina in 1994. Additionally, Tor Endresen and Bettina Soriat, representing Norway and Austria, respectively, in this year's event, had performed in previous contests as backing vocalist. Endresen had supported Norway in 1988, and Soriat had supported Austria in 1996.

Eurovision Song Contest 1997 participants
Country	Broadcaster	Artist	Song	Language	Songwriter(s)	Conductor
Austria	ORF	Bettina Soriat	"One Step"	German	Marc Berry; Ina Siber	No conductor
Bosnia and Herzegovina	RTVBiH	Alma Čardžić	"Goodbye"	Bosnian	Sinan Alimanović; Milić Vukašinović	Sinan Alimanović
Croatia	HRT	E.N.I.	"Probudi me"	Croatian	Alida Šarar; Davor Tolja	No conductor
Cyprus	CyBC	Hara and Andreas Konstantinou	"Mana mou" (Μάνα μου)	Greek	Constantina Konstantinou	Stavros Lantsias
Denmark	DR	Kølig Kaj (Note: Credited on screen as Thomas Lægaard)	"Stemmen i mit liv"	Danish	Thomas Lægaard; Lars Pedersen	Jan Glæsel
Estonia	ETV	Maarja	"Keelatud maa"	Estonian	Harmo Kallaste; Kaari Sillamaa	Tarmo Leinatamm
France	France Télévision	Fanny	"Sentiments songes"	French	Jean-Paul Dréau	Régis Dupré
Germany	NDR (Note: On behalf of the German public broadcasting consortium ARD)	Bianca Shomburg	"Zeit"	German	Bernd Meinunger; Ralph Siegel	No conductor
Greece	ERT	Marianna Zorba	"Horepse" (Χόρεψε)	Greek	Manolis Manouselis	Anacreon Papageorgiou
Hungary	MTV	V.I.P.	"Miért kell, hogy elmenj?"	Hungarian	Krisztina Bokor Fekete; Sándor Józsa; Attila Környei; Viktor Rakonczai	Péter Wolf
Iceland	RÚV	Paul Oscar	"Minn hinsti dans"	Icelandic	Páll Óskar Hjálmtýsson; Trausti Haraldsson	Szymon Kuran
Ireland	RTÉ	Marc Roberts	"Mysterious Woman"	English	John Farry	No conductor
Italy	RAI	Jalisse	"Fiumi di parole"	Italian	Carmen di Domenico; Alessandra Drusian; Fabio Ricci	Lucio Fabbri
Malta	PBS	Debbie Scerri	"Let Me Fly"	English	Ray Agius	Ray Agius
Netherlands	NOS	Mrs. Einstein	"Niemand heeft nog tijd"	Dutch	Ed Hooijmans	Dick Bakker
Norway	NRK	Tor Endresen	"San Francisco"	Norwegian	Tor Endresen; Arne Myksvoll	Geir Langslet
Poland	TVP	Anna Maria Jopek	"Ale jestem"	Polish	Magda Czapińska; Tomasz Lewandowski	Krzesimir Dębski
Portugal	RTP	Célia Lawson	"Antes do adeus"	Portuguese	Rosa Lobato de Faria; Thilo Krasmann	Thilo Krasmann
Russia	ORT	Alla Pugacheva	"Primadonna" (Примадонна)	Russian	Alla Pugacheva	Rutger Gunnarsson
Slovenia	RTVSLO	Tanja Ribič	"Zbudi se"	Slovene	Saša Lošić; Zoran Predin	Mojmir Sepe
Spain	TVE	Marcos Llunas	"Sin rencor"	Spanish	Marcos Llunas	Toni Xuclà
Sweden	SVT	Blond	"Bara hon älskar mig"	Swedish	Stephan Berg	Curt-Eric Holmquist
Switzerland	SRG SSR	Barbara Berta	"Dentro di me"	Italian	Barbara Berta	Pietro Damiani
Turkey	TRT	Şebnem Paker and Grup Ethnic	"Dinle"	Turkish	Mehtap Alnıtemiz; Levent Çoker	Levent Çoker
United Kingdom	BBC	Katrina and the Waves	"Love Shine a Light"	English	Kimberley Rew	Don Airey

=== Qualification ===
Due to the high number of countries wishing to enter the contest a relegation system was introduced in 1993 in order to reduce the number of countries which could compete in each year's contest. Any relegated countries would be able to return the following year, thus allowing all countries the opportunity to compete in at least one in every two editions. The audio-only qualifying round used in 1996 had been poorly received among the competing countries, and so a new relegation system was introduced by the European Broadcasting Union (EBU) for 1997 and future contests. The twenty-five participants in the 1997 contest were made up of the previous year's winning country and host nation Ireland, and the twenty-four countries which had the highest average points total over the preceding four contests. In cases where the average was identical between two or more countries the total number of points scored in the most recent contest determined the final order. Any countries which were not able to compete in the 1997 contest would then be eligible to compete in the 1998 event.

Belgium, Bosnia and Herzegovina, Finland, Lithuania, Luxembourg, Romania and Slovakia were therefore excluded from participating in the 1997 contest; however following Israel's withdrawal due to the date of the final clashing with its Holocaust Remembrance Day, Bosnia and Herzegovina was subsequently provided a reprieve and allowed to participate. Macedonia was also excluded due to its failure to progress through the qualifying round in 1996. The calculations used to determine the countries relegated for the 1997 contest are outlined in the table below.

Table key

Qualifier
‡ Automatic qualifier

Calculation of average points to determine qualification for the 1997 contest (Note: Determined by totalling all points awarded in the past four contests and dividing by the number of times that country had participated)
Rank	Country	Average	Yearly Point Totals			
Rank	Country	Average	1993	1994	1995	1996
1	Ireland ‡	154.75	187	226	44	162
2	Norway	114.50	120	76	148	114
3	United Kingdom	95.00	164	63	76	77
4	Sweden	84.25	89	48	100	100
5	Malta	77.50	69	97	76	68
6	France	76.75	121	74	94	18
7	Poland	70.67		166	15	31
8	Hungary	62.50	DNQ	122	3	DNQ
9	Croatia	61.75	31	27	91	98
10	Switzerland	61.67	148	15	R	22
11	Netherlands	58.00	92	4	R	78
12	Portugal	57.50	60	73	5	92
13	Cyprus	54.75	17	51	79	72
14	Greece	53.00	64	44	68	36
15	Spain	52.75	58	17	119	17
16	Denmark	50.50	9	R	92	DNQ
17	Germany	49.00	18	128	1	DNQ
18	Estonia	48.00	DNQ	2	R	94
19	Austria	46.50	32	19	67	68
20	Italy	45.00	45			
21	Russia	43.50		70	17	DNQ
22	Iceland	43.25	42	49	31	51
23	Israel (Note: As Israel decided not to participate, the eliminated country with the next highest average points total, Bosnia and Herzegovina, was awarded its place.)	42.50	4	R	81	DNQ
24	Slovenia	36.33	9	R	84	16
25	Turkey	29.33	10	R	21	57
26	Bosnia and Herzegovina	23.25	27	39	14	13
27	Slovakia	17.00	DNQ	15	R	19
28	Romania	14.00	DNQ	14	R	DNQ
29	Finland	13.33	20	11	R	9
30 (Note: Despite having the same average score, Belgium ranked higher than Luxembourg by virtue of receiving more points in the most recent contest.)	Belgium	11.00	3	R	8	22
31	Luxembourg	11.00	11	R		
32	Lithuania	0.00		0	R	
–	Macedonia	– (Note: Despite not participating in the 1996 contest, in what would have been its début entry, Macedonia's entry into and failure to progress from the qualifying round was used for the purposes of determining relegated countries.)				DNQ

== Production ==
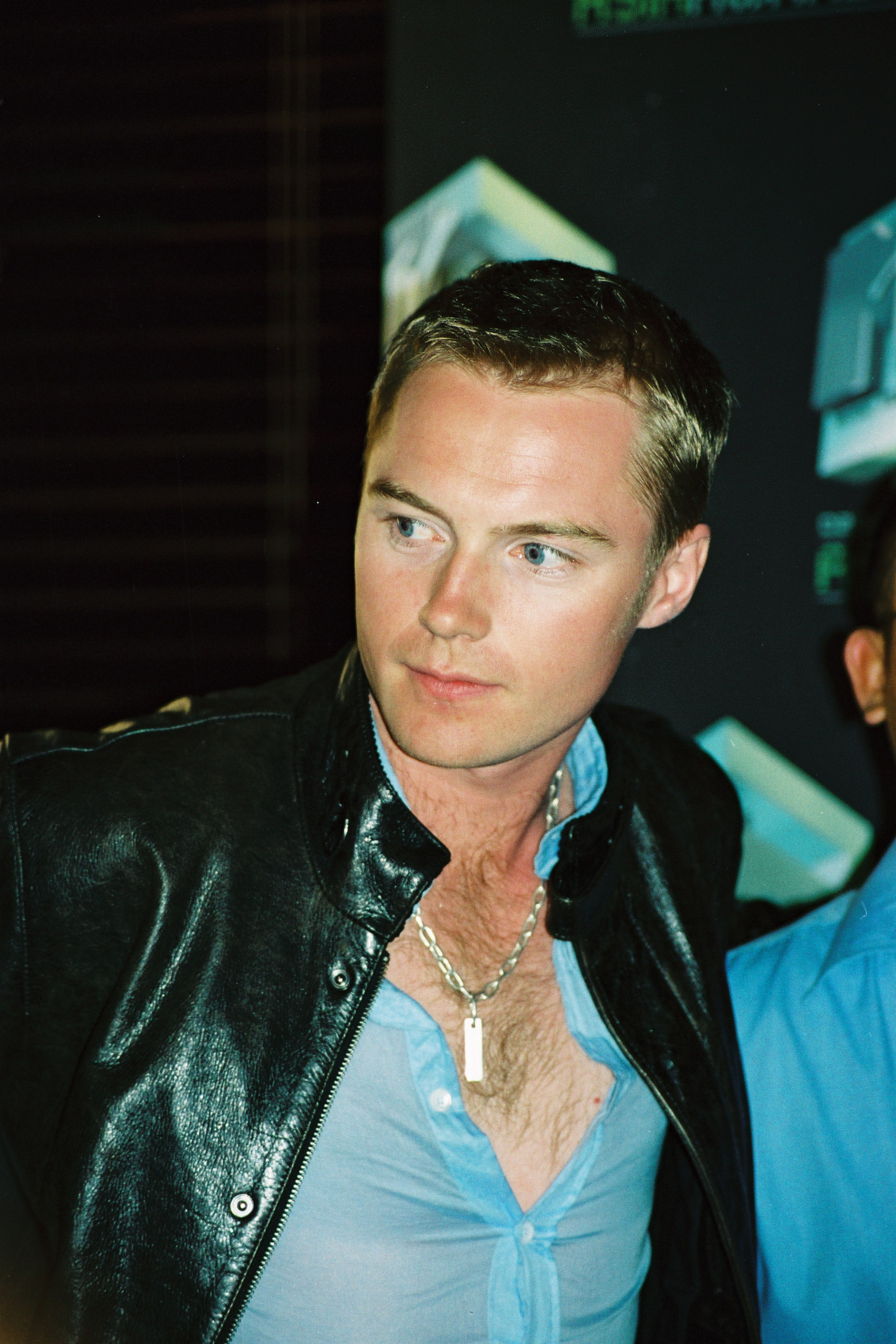
Ronan Keating (pictured in 2002) served as co-presenter of the 1997 contest and performed during the interval act as lead singer of Boyzone.

The Eurovision Song Contest 1997 was produced by the Irish public broadcaster Radio Telefís Éireann (RTÉ). Noel Curran served as executive producer, Ian McGarry served as director, Paula Farrell and John Casey served as designers, and Frank McNamara served as musical director, leading the RTÉ Concert Orchestra. On behalf of the contest organisers, the European Broadcasting Union (EBU), the event was overseen by Marie-Claire Vionnet as scrutineer.

Rehearsals in the contest venue for the competing acts began on 28 April 1997. Each country had two technical rehearsals in the week approaching the contest, with countries rehearsing in the order in which they would perform. The first rehearsals took place on 28 and 29 April, with each country allowed 40 minutes total on stage followed by a 20-minute press conference, followed by the second rehearsals on 30 April and 1 May lasting 30 minutes. Times were also arranged during the week for the artists to be recorded in the RTÉ studios, with footage used during the postcards between each song. Three dress rehearsals were held on 2 and 3 May, with an audience in attendance during the evening dress rehearsal on 2 May. The final dress rehearsal on 3 May was also recorded for use as a production stand-by in case of problems during the live contest. A tight security presence was felt during the rehearsal week; emergency drills were held by Gardaí, including evacuations of the Point Theatre, as a precaution against potential disruption from loyalist paramilitaries as part of the wider sectarian conflict in Northern Ireland.

The Irish television and radio presenter Carrie Crowley and the Irish singer Ronan Keating were the presenters of the 1997 contest. The trophy awarded to the winners was designed by Maura Whelan and Luc Racine, and was presented by the previous year's winning artist Eimear Quinn.

== Format ==
=== Entries ===
Each participating broadcaster submitted one song, which was required to be no longer than three minutes in duration and performed in the language, or one of the languages, of the country which it represented. Short quotations from another language, no more than a single phrase repeated a maximum of three times, were permitted. A maximum of six performers were allowed on stage during each country's performance, and all participants were required to have reached the age of 16 in the year of the contest. Each entry could utilise all or part of the live orchestra and could use instrumental-only backing tracks. This was the first time that a competing song could be accompanied entirely with a backing track following a change to the contest rules, with the previous rules stating that any backing tracks used could only include the sound of instruments featured on stage being mimed by the performers. For those countries which opted to utilise the orchestra a separate musical director could be nominated to lead the orchestra during their performance, with the host musical director, Frank McNamara, also available to conduct for those countries which did not nominate their own conductor. The entries from Austria, Croatia, Germany and Ireland were performed entirely without live orchestration.

Selected entries were not permitted to be released commercially until after 3 February 1997 and after having been selected for the contest. Each country's participating broadcaster was required to have selected its entry by 10 March, and all entries had to be submitted to the contest organisers by 19 March, including the score of the song for use by the orchestra, a sound recording of the entry and backing track for use during the contest, and the text of the song lyrics in its original language and translations in French and English for distribution to the participating broadcasters, their commentators and juries.

Following the confirmation of the twenty-five competing countries, the draw to determine the running order was held on 28 November 1996.

=== Voting procedure ===
The results of the 1997 contest were determined through the same scoring system as had first been introduced in 1975: each country awarded twelve points to its favourite entry, followed by ten points to its second favourite, and then awarded points in decreasing value from eight to one for the remaining songs which featured in the country's top ten, with countries unable to vote for their own entry. The points awarded by the majority of countries were determined by an assembled jury of sixteen individuals, which was required to be split evenly between members of the public and music professionals, comprised additionally of an equal number of men and women, and below and above 30 years of age. Each jury member voted in secret and awarded between one and ten votes to each participating song, excluding that from their own country and with no abstentions permitted. The votes of each member were collected following the country's performance and then tallied by the non-voting jury chairperson to determine the points to be awarded. In any cases where two or more songs in the top ten received the same number of votes, a show of hands by all jury members was used to determine the final placing; if a tie still remained, the youngest jury member would have the deciding vote.

For the first time however, as part of a trial held by the contest organisers, televoting was used to determine the points from five of the participating countries. In these countries viewers had a total of five minutes to register their vote by calling one of twenty-four different telephone numbers to represent the twenty-five competing entries except that which represented their own country. Once the voting phone lines were opened following the performance of the last competing entry, a video recap containing short clips of each competing entry with the accompanying phone number for voting was shown in order to aid viewers during the voting window. In those countries which opted to use televoting to determine their points a jury was still required which would function as a back-up in case technical failure prevented the televote results from being used. The composition of the back-up juries in these countries was identical to the juries in the other countries with regards to profession, gender and age.

== Contest overview ==
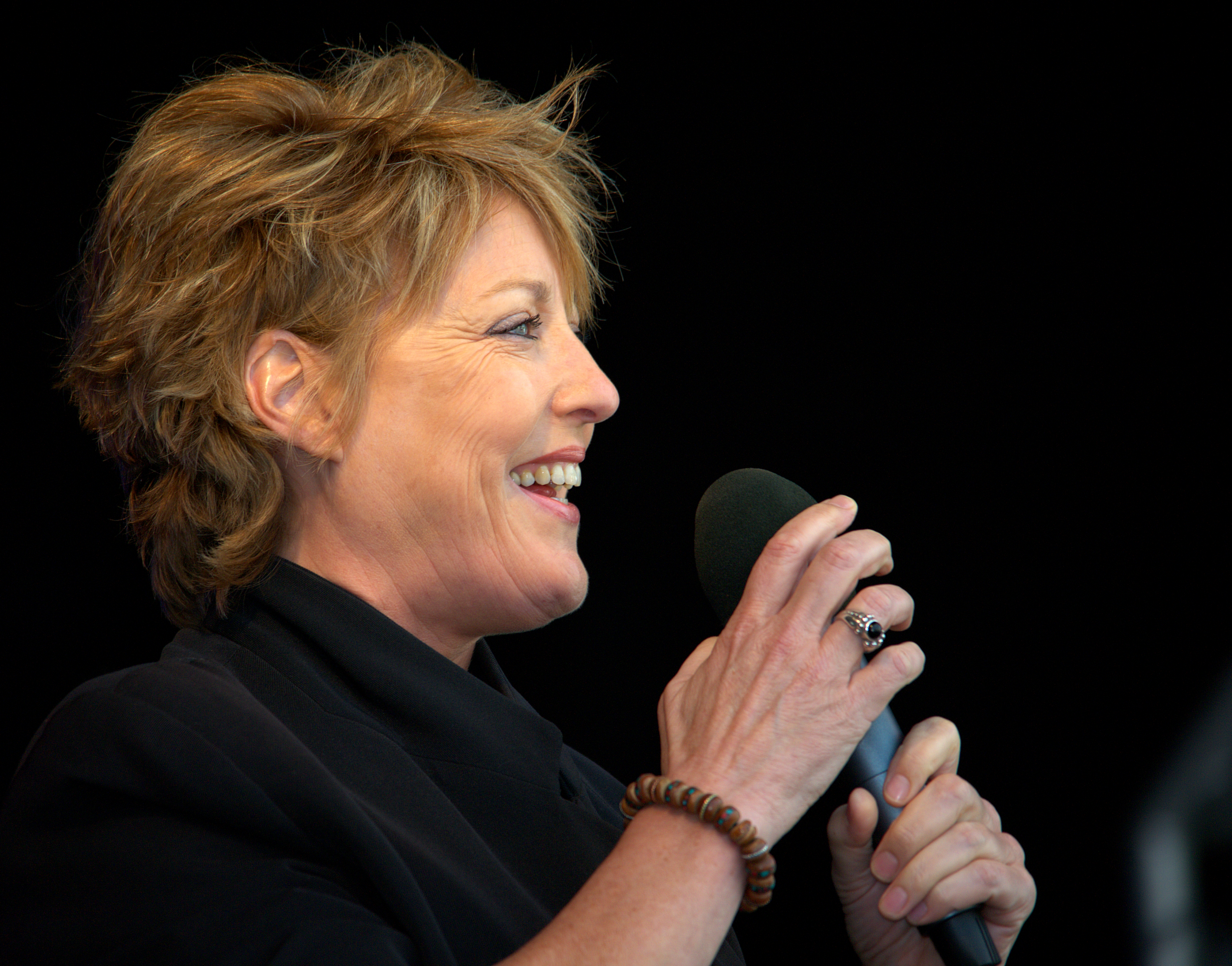
Katrina Leskanich (pictured in 2014), lead singer of the 1997 winning performers Katrina and the Waves

The contest took place on 3 May 1997 at 20:00 (IST) and lasted 3 hours and 11 minutes.

The show was opened by good luck messages from past Eurovision winners and hosts to the contestants in the contest, and short interviews with previous contestants also featured preceding some of the postcards between the entries. Irish boy band Boyzone, with co-presenter Keating as a member, featured as part of the show's interval act, performing the song "Let the Message Run Free", a smash hit in Ireland at the time.

The winner was the United Kingdom represented by the song "Love Shine a Light", composed by Kimberley Rew and performed by Katrina and the Waves. This was the United Kingdom's fifth contest win – its first in sixteen years – following victories in 1967, 1969, 1976 and 1981. As of 2026, this is the last winning UK Eurovision entry. Ireland's second-place finish was its fifth placing in the top two within six years, while Turkey and Cyprus achieved their highest placings yet by finishing third and fifth respectively. Norway meanwhile finished in last place for the eighth time and received its fourth nul points. Following this contest Italy's RAI declined to participate in future events and an Italian entry would not participate in the Eurovision Song Contest for 14 years, until its return at the 2011 event.

Results of the Eurovision Song Contest 1997
R/O	Country	Artist	Song	Points	Place
1	Cyprus	Hara and Andreas Konstantinou	"Mana mou"	98	5
2	Turkey	Şebnem Paker and Grup Ethnic	"Dinle"	121	3
3	Norway	Tor Endresen	"San Francisco"	0	24
4	Austria	Bettina Soriat	"One Step"	12	21
5	Ireland	Marc Roberts	"Mysterious Woman"	157	2
6	Slovenia	Tanja Ribič	"Zbudi se"	60	10
7	Switzerland	Barbara Berta	"Dentro di me"	5	22
8	Netherlands	Mrs. Einstein	"Niemand heeft nog tijd"	5	22
9	Italy	Jalisse	"Fiumi di parole"	114	4
10	Spain	Marcos Llunas	"Sin rencor"	96	6
11	Germany	Bianca Shomburg	"Zeit"	22	18
12	Poland	Anna Maria Jopek	"Ale jestem"	54	11
13	Estonia	Maarja	"Keelatud maa"	82	8
14	Bosnia and Herzegovina	Alma Čardžić	"Goodbye"	22	18
15	Portugal	Célia Lawson	"Antes do adeus"	0	24
16	Sweden	Blond	"Bara hon älskar mig"	36	14
17	Greece	Marianna Zorba	"Horepse"	39	12
18	Malta	Debbie Scerri	"Let Me Fly"	66	9
19	Hungary	V.I.P.	"Miért kell, hogy elmenj?"	39	12
20	Russia	Alla Pugacheva	"Primadonna"	33	15
21	Denmark	Kølig Kaj	"Stemmen i mit liv"	25	16
22	France	Fanny	"Sentiments songes"	95	7
23	Croatia	E.N.I.	"Probudi me"	24	17
24	United Kingdom	Katrina and the Waves	"Love Shine a Light"	227	1
25	Iceland	Paul Oscar	"Minn hinsti dans"	18	20

=== Spokespersons ===
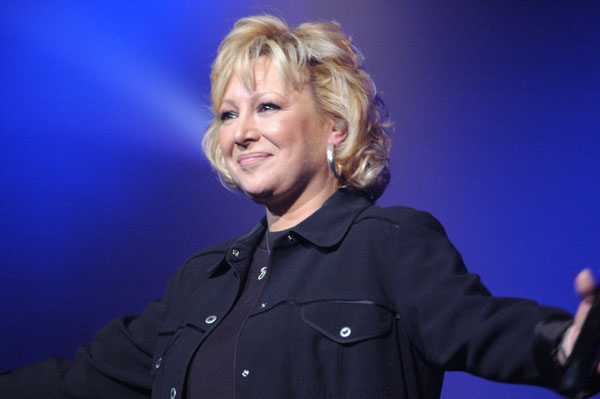
Marie Myriam (pictured in 2007), winner of the 1977 contest, was one of the French spokespersons at this event.

Each participating broadcaster appointed a spokesperson who was responsible for announcing, in English or French, the votes for its respective country. As had been the case since the 1994 contest, the spokespersons were connected via satellite and appeared in vision during the broadcast. Spokespersons at the 1997 contest are listed below.

1. Cyprus – Marios Skordis
2. Turkey – Ömer Önder
3. Norway – Ragnhild Sælthun Fjørtoft
4. Austria – Adriana Zartl
5. Ireland – Eileen Dunne
6. Slovenia – Mojca Mavec
7. Switzerland – Sandy Altermatt
8. Netherlands – Corry Brokken
9. Italy – Peppi Franzelin
10. Spain – Belén Fernández de Henestrosa
11. Germany – Christina Mänz
12. Poland – Jan Chojnacki
13. Estonia – Helene Tedre
14. Bosnia and Herzegovina – Segmedina Srna
15. Portugal – Cristina Rocha
16. Sweden – Gösta Hanson
17. Greece – Niki Venega
18. Malta – Anna Bonanno
19. Hungary – Györgyi Albert
20. Russia – Arina Sharapova
21. Denmark – Bent Henius
22. France – Frédéric Ferrer and Marie Myriam
23. Croatia – Davor Meštrović
24. United Kingdom – Colin Berry
25. Iceland – Svanhildur Konráðsdóttir

== Detailed voting results ==
Jury voting was used to determine the points awarded by most countries, with televoting used in Austria, Germany, Switzerland, Sweden and the United Kingdom. The announcement of the results from each country was conducted in the order in which they performed, with the spokespersons announcing their country's points in English or French in ascending order. The detailed breakdown of the points awarded by each country is listed in the tables below.

Detailed voting results of the Eurovision Song Contest 1997
Voting procedure used: 100% jury vote 100% televoting		Total score	Cyprus	Turkey	Norway	Austria	Ireland	Slovenia	Switzerland	Netherlands	Italy	Spain	Germany	Poland	Estonia	Bosnia and Herzegovina	Portugal	Sweden	Greece	Malta	Hungary	Russia	Denmark	France	Croatia	United Kingdom	Iceland
Contestants	Cyprus	98			2		3	4	4	10	4	10	5		1		3		**12**	7		1	7	4	4	5	**12**
Contestants	Turkey	121				7	2		6	2	7	**12**	**12**		6	**12**	5	6	7	10	6	4		6		4	7
Contestants	Norway	0																									
Contestants	Austria	12								3				1							5	3					
Contestants	Ireland	157	8	6	3	10		1	7	4	10	6	8	7	8	8	10	10			8	5	10	10	6	**12**	
Contestants	Slovenia	60	2	10										2	4	7	4		3	5		10		7	3		3
Contestants	Switzerland	5									2	3															
Contestants	Netherlands	5		1																4							
Contestants	Italy	114	6	5		1	1	10	10	7		8	4	8		6	**12**	3	5		3	7	4		10	3	1
Contestants	Spain	96	10	4			6	5	8	6	3		2	4			8		6	**12**	10	8	2	2			
Contestants	Germany	22				3			5		5									3	1				5		
Contestants	Poland	54			4	8		7		1	1	2	6		3	4	2		1		7		5	3			
Contestants	Estonia	82	1			6	8	3			**12**	4	7	6		1	1	1			4		8	8		10	2
Contestants	Bosnia and Herzegovina	22		8		4			2				3					4							1		
Contestants	Portugal	0																									
Contestants	Sweden	36			8		5	6															6			7	4
Contestants	Greece	39	**12**		5							7								6		2			7		
Contestants	Malta	66	5	**12**	10		7				6	1				5			8				3	1	8		
Contestants	Hungary	39		3			4							5	5					2				5	2	8	5
Contestants	Russia	33			1	5		**12**		8					7												
Contestants	Denmark	25			7				1									7	2							2	6
Contestants	France	95	3	2	**12**		10	2	3	5				**12**	**12**	3	6	2	4		2	6	1				10
Contestants	Croatia	24	4										1	3		2		5		8						1	
Contestants	United Kingdom	**227**	7	7	6	**12**	**12**	8	**12**	**12**	8	5	10	10	10	10	7	**12**	10	1	**12**	**12**	**12**	**12**	**12**		8
Contestants	Iceland	18				2									2			8								6	

=== 12 points ===
The below table summarises how the maximum 12 points were awarded from one country to another. The winning country is shown in bold. The United Kingdom received the maximum score of 12 points from ten countries, with France and Turkey receiving three sets of 12 points each, Cyprus receiving two sets of 12 points, and Estonia, Greece, Ireland, Italy, Malta, Russia and Spain each receiving one maximum score.

Distribution of 12 points awarded at the Eurovision Song Contest 1997
N.	Contestant	Nation(s) giving 12 points
10	**United Kingdom**	Austria, Croatia, Denmark, France, Hungary, Ireland, Netherlands, Russia, Sweden, Switzerland
3	France	Estonia, Norway, Poland
3	Turkey	Bosnia and Herzegovina, Germany, Spain
2	Cyprus	Greece, Iceland
1	Estonia	Italy
1	Greece	Cyprus
1	Ireland	United Kingdom
1	Italy	Portugal
1	Malta	Turkey
1	Russia	Slovenia
1	Spain	Malta

== Broadcasts ==
Each participating broadcaster was required to relay the contest live and in full via television. Non-participating EBU member broadcasters were also able to relay the contest as "passive participants"; any passive countries wishing to participate in the following year's event were also required to provide a live broadcast of the contest or a deferred broadcast within 24 hours. Broadcasters were able to send commentators to provide coverage of the contest in their own native language and to relay information about the artists and songs to their television viewers. These commentators were typically sent to the venue to report on the event, and were able to provide commentary from small booths constructed at the back of the venue. An estimated audience of 300 million viewers was reported.

Known details on the broadcasts in each country, including the specific broadcasting stations and commentators, are shown in the tables below:

Broadcasters and commentators in participating countries
Country	Broadcaster	Channel(s)	Commentator(s)	Ref.
Austria	ORF	ORF 1	Ernst Grissemann	
Austria	ORF	FM4	Stermann & Grissemann	
Croatia	HRT	HRT1	Aleksandar Kostadinov	
Cyprus	CyBC	RIK 1	Evi Papamichail	
Denmark	DR	DR1	Hans Otto Bisgaard	
Denmark	DR	DR P3	Katrine Nyland Sørensen and Morten H. Pankoke	
Estonia	ETV			
Estonia	ER	Vikerraadio		
France	France Télévision	France 2	Olivier Minne	
Germany	ARD	Das Erste	Peter Urban	
Greece	ERT	ET1	Dafni Bokota	
Hungary	MTV	MTV 1	István Vágó	
Iceland	RÚV	Sjónvarpið, Rás 2	Jakob Frímann Magnússon	
Ireland	RTÉ	RTÉ One	Pat Kenny	
Ireland	RTÉ	RTÉ Radio 1	Larry Gogan	
Italy	RAI	RAI Uno (Note: Deferred broadcast at 23:30 (CEST))	Ettore Andenna	
Netherlands	NOS	TV2	Willem van Beusekom	
Netherlands	NCRV	Radio 2		
Norway	NRK	NRK1	Jostein Pedersen	
Norway	NRK	NRK P1	Kristian Lindeman	
Poland	TVP	TVP1	Jan Wilkans	
Poland	PR	Polskie Radio Bis	Artur Orzech and Dariusz Michalski	
Portugal	RTP	RTP1 (Note: Additional deferred broadcast on RTP Internacional at 22:30 (CEST))		
Russia	ORT	ORT (Note: Also broadcast deferred via the Orbita satellite broadcasting system in the Russian Far East)	Philipp Kirkorov and Sergey Antipov	
Slovenia	RTVSLO	SLO 1		
Slovenia	RTVSLO	TV Koper-Capodistria		
Slovenia	RTVSLO	Val 202	Andrej Karoli	
Spain	TVE	La Primera (Note: Deferred broadcast at 21:30 (CEST); additional deferred broadcast on TVE Internacional at 22:45 (CEST))	José Luis Uribarri	
Sweden	SVT	SVT2	Janne Jingryd	
Sweden	SR	SR P3	Claes-Johan Larsson and Susan Seidemar	
Switzerland	SRG SSR	Schweiz 4	Sandra Studer	
Switzerland	SRG SSR	TSR	Pierre Grandjean	
Switzerland	SRG SSR	TSI		
Turkey	TRT	TRT 1 (Note: Additional live broadcast on TRT Int)		
United Kingdom	BBC	BBC1 (Note: Additional live broadcast on BBC Prime)	Terry Wogan	
United Kingdom	BBC	BBC Radio 2	Ken Bruce	

Broadcasters and commentators in non-participating countries
Country	Broadcaster	Channel(s)	Commentator(s)	Ref.
Australia	SBS	SBS TV (Note: Deferred broadcast the following day at 19:00 (ACST))		
Belgium	BRTN	TV1	André Vermeulen	
Belgium	RTBF	RTBF La 1	Jean-Pierre Hautier	
Falkland Islands	BFBS	BFBS Television (Note: Delayed broadcast on 17 May 1997 at 21:00 (FKT))	Terry Wogan	
Faroe Islands	SvF (Note: Deferred broadcast the following day at 13:00 (WEST))		Hans Otto Bisgaard	
Finland	YLE	TV1	Aki Sirkesalo and Olli Ahvenlahti	
Finland	YLE	Radio Suomi	Iris Mattila and Sanna Kojo	
Greenland	KNR	KNR (Note: Deferred broadcast at 22:55 (WGST))		
Israel	IBA	Channel 1		
Jordan	JRTV	JTV2		
Romania	TVR	TVR 1	Doina Caramzulescu and Costin Grigore	
Slovakia	STV	STV2 (Note: Deferred broadcast the following day at 21:35 (CEST))		
Yugoslavia	RTS	RTS 2		

== Other awards ==
=== Barbara Dex Award ===
The Barbara Dex Award was first organised for artists in this year's contest. The award, created by the fansite House of Eurovision, was awarded to the performer deemed to have been the "worst dressed" among the participants. The winner in 1997 was Malta's representative, Debbie Scerri (as determined by the founders of the House of Eurovision site, Edwin van Thillo and Rob Paardekam).

== Legacy ==
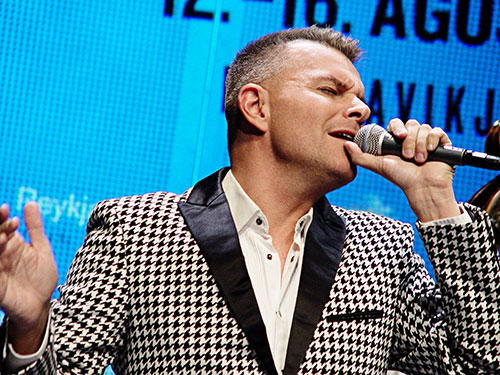
Iceland's Paul Oscar was the first openly LGBT artist to compete at Eurovision

The Eurovision Song Contest has long held a fandom within the LGBT community, however it was not until the 1997 event that an openly LGBT artist was selected to compete in the event. Iceland's Paul Oscar was the first openly gay man to compete as a lead artist in Eurovision. Paul Oscar's participation, as well as changing attitudes to homosexuality in Europe in the following years, marked the beginning of wider visibility of LGBT artists and themes; the following year's event provided the first trans participant in Israel's Dana International, 2002 saw Slovenia's Sestre become the first competing artists to perform in drag, (Note: Although a member of the Norwegian drag act the Great Garlic Girls performed as backing vocalist for Norway's Ketil Stokkan at the 1986 contest in drag, they were not credited for their performance.) and the 2000 contest contained the first display of same-sex affection on stage through a kiss between the two male members of the Israeli band PingPong. Since the 1997 contest many openly LGBT artists have competed in the contest, including several winners, among them Dana International, Austria's Conchita Wurst in 2014, and the Netherlands' Duncan Laurence in 2019. Paul Oscar's contest performance, which featured four female backing dancers dressed in black latex clothing and sexually suggestive choreography, pushed the boundaries for sexual expression on the Eurovision stage for the first time.

The changes in the rules regarding the use of orchestra for this contest would eventually lead to the complete abandonment of live musical accompaniment in the Eurovision Song Contest. Ahead of the 1999 event the rules were modified again to make the procurement of an orchestra an optional component to staging the event, with that year's event becoming the first to have all competing entries performed to pre-recorded backing tracks. The rules of the contest have since been modified further, and no live musical accompaniment is now allowed for any competing entries. The abolishment of the orchestra proved controversial among some circles, with three-time, former Eurovision winner Johnny Logan referring to the modified event as "karaoke" in 2000.

The introduction of televoting to the contest followed several years of successive Irish wins, with the national juries typically voting for more traditional, middle-of-the-road songs than those that represented the wider tastes of the general public, as was the case in 1996 when Eimear Quinn's "The Voice" was victorious over more modern entries such as Gina G's "Ooh Aah... Just a Little Bit", which represented the United Kingdom at that year's event and would go on to receive a nomination for Best Dance Recording at the 1998 Grammy Awards. The successful trial of televoting in five countries led to widespread adoption for all countries in 1998, and public voting continues to play a part in determining the result of the contest to the present day. The widespread use of televoting in the following years would however lead to accusations of greater political bias and "bloc voting", with the perception that neighbouring countries swap points and large diasporas are able to vote en masse for their native countries, skewing the results in their favour. Controversy over the perceived unfairness of the voting system reached a head in 2007, when the public vote largely rewarded the entries from Eastern European countries over those from Western Europe. The EBU would ultimately make changes to mitigate the impact of neighbourly voting by splitting countries by geographical location and voting history in the semi-finals from 2008 and re-introducing juries to account for 50% of each country's points in 2009.

== Notes and references ==
=== Bibliography ===
- O'Connor, John Kennedy (2010). The Eurovision Song Contest: The Official History (2nd ed.). London, United Kingdom: Carlton Books. ISBN 978-1-84732-521-1.
- Roxburgh, Gordon (2020). Songs for Europe: The United Kingdom at the Eurovision Song Contest. Vol. Four: The 1990s. Prestatyn, United Kingdom: Telos Publishing. ISBN 978-1-84583-163-9.
- Thorsson, Leif; Verhage, Martin (2006). Melodifestivalen genom tiderna : de svenska uttagningarna och internationella finalerna [Melodifestivalen through the ages: the Swedish selections and international finals] (in Swedish). Stockholm, Sweden: Premium Publishing. pp. 260–261. ISBN 91-89136-29-2.
- West, Chris (2020). Eurovision! : A History of Modern Europe Through the World's Greatest Song Contest. London, United Kingdom: Melville House UK. pp. 191–195. ISBN 978-1-911545-55-2.
