= Portugal in the Eurovision Song Contest 1997 =

- Eurovision Song Contest 1997
- Participating broadcaster: Radiotelevisão Portuguesa (RTP)
- Country: Portugal
- Selection process: Festival RTP da Canção 1997
- Selection date: 7 March 1997

Competing entry
- Song: "Antes do adeus"
- Artist: Célia Lawson
- Songwriters: Thilo Krasmann; Rosa Lobato de Faria

Placement
- Final result: 24th, 0 points

Participation chronology

Portugal was represented at the Eurovision Song Contest 1997 with the song "Antes do adeus" composed by Thilo Krasmann, with lyrics by Rosa Lobato de Faria, and performed by Célia Lawson. The Portuguese participating broadcaster, Radiotelevisão Portuguesa (RTP), organised the national final Festival RTP da Canção 1997 in order to select its entry for the contest. After five semi-finals and a final which took place between January and March 1997, "Antes do adeus" performed by Célia Lawson emerged as the winner after achieving the highest score following the combination of votes from 20 regional juries and a public televote.

The song competed in the Eurovision Song Contest which took place on 3 May 1997. Performing during the show in position 15, it placed twenty-fourth (last) out of the 24 participating songs from different countries and failed to score any points, making it the second time that the Portuguese entry had placed last in the history of the competition and receiving nul points.

== Background ==
Prior to the 1997 contest, Radiotelevisão Portuguesa (RTP) had participated in the Eurovision Song Contest representing Portugal thirty-two times since its first entry in 1964. Its highest placing in the contest was sixth, achieved in 1996 with the song "O meu coração não tem cor" performed by Lúcia Moniz. Its least successful result has been last place, which they have achieved on two occasions, most recently in 1974 with the song "E depois do adeus" performed by Paulo de Carvalho. The Portuguese entry has also received nul points once, in 1964 with the song "Oração" performed by António Calvário.

RTP has traditionally selected its entry for the Eurovision Song Contest via the music competition Festival da Canção, with an exception in 1988 when it selected its entry internally. The broadcaster organized Festival RTP da Canção 1997 in order to select the 1997 Portuguese entry.

== Before Eurovision ==
=== Festival RTP da Canção 1997 ===
The logo of Festival RTP da Canção 1997

Festival RTP da Canção 1997 was the 34th edition of Festival da Canção that selected the Portuguese entry for the Eurovision Song Contest 1997. Eighteen entries competed in the competition that consisted of five semi-finals held between 25 January and 22 February 1997 leading to an eight-song final on 7 March 1997. All six shows of the competition were broadcast on RTP1 and RTP Internacional.

==== Format ====
The format of the competition consisted of six shows: five semi-finals held on 25 January 1997, 1 February 1997, 8 February 1997, 15 February 1997 and 22 February 1997, and the final on 7 March 1997. Each semi-final featured three competing entries from which the winning song as determined exclusively by public televoting advanced from each show and joined by an additional three automatic qualifying entries to complete the eight song lineup in the final. Results during the final were determined by the votes from 20 regional juries and public televoting. Each jury assigned points from 1-6, 8 and 10, while the televote awarded an additional set of points from 1-6, 8 and 10.

==== Competing entries ====
Eighteen composers were selected by RTP through two methods. Fifteen of the composers were selected by a jury panel consisting of journalists Jaime Fernandes and Nuno Infante do Carmo, singer Simone de Oliveira and RTP representative Fernanda Ferreira from 224 submissions received through an open call for songs, while the three remaining composers were invited by RTP for the competition with their songs automatically qualifying to the final: João Mota Oliveira, José Cid and Thilo Krasmann. José Cid represented Portugal in the Eurovision Song Contest 1980.

Competing entries
Artist	Song	Songwriter(s)	Selection
Água Mole	"Pedra dura"	Paulo Alexandre Pereira Matias, Rui Eduardo Rodrigues Rocha	Open call winner
Carla Pires	"Gaivotas de um mar revolto"	José Manuel Coelho	Open call winner
Carlos Alberto Vidal	"Menino de rua"	Carlos Alberto Vidal, José Marinho	Open call winner
Carlos Coincas	"Canto de esperar"	Jan van Dijck, Fernando Paulo Gonçalves	Open call winner
Célia Lawson	"Antes do adeus"	Thilo Krasmann, Rosa Lobato de Faria	Invited by RTP
Cristina Almeida	"Senhora da saia verde"	Carlos Canelhas, Maria Amália Ortiz da Fonseca	Open call winner
Ema and Isabel Viana	"Corrente da terra mãe"	José Manuel Afonso, Isabel Viana	Open call winner
Filipa Lourenço	"Quadro sonhador"	Rui Filipe, Filipa Lourenço	Open call winner
Oriundi	"Nosso canto chão"	Jan van Dijck, Nuno Gomes dos Santos	Open call winner
Os Meninos da Sacristia	"Canção urgente"	José Cid	Invited by RTP
Paula Cardoso and Carlos Ançã	"Sonhos de verão"	Justin Albert Tahina, Eduardo Godolfim	Open call winner
Paulo Caetano	"Sons de festa"	António Alves dos Santos, Daniel Marques Ferreira	Open call winner
Paulo João Sousa	"Não vou chorar"	Paulo Martins de Sousa	Open call winner
Raquel Alão	"Quando eu te beijo"	João Oliveira, José Miguel Oliveira	Open call winner
Sónia Mendes	"Da primeira vez"	João Mota Oliveira, Nuno Gomes dos Santos	Invited by RTP
Susana Pinto	"Rosa dos ventos"	Simon Wadsworth, Fernando Soares, Ramiro Paulo Martins	Open call winner
Telmo Miranda	"Madrigal de Lianor"	José Manuel Coelho	Open call winner
Vanda	"África"	Pedro Miguel Luz Mascarenhas	Open call winner

==== Semi-finals ====
The five semi-finals took place during the television programme Há Horas Felizes between 25 January and 22 February 1997, hosted by Isabel Angelino. In each semi-final three entries competed and one advanced to the final based on the results from a public televote.

Semi-final 1 – 25 January 1997
R/O	Artist	Song	Result
1	Carlos Coincas	"Canto de esperar"	—N/a
2	Oriundi	"Nosso canto chão"	Qualified
3	Paulo João Sousa	"Não vou chorar"	—N/a

Semi-final 2 – 1 February 1997
R/O	Artist	Song	Result
1	Carla Pires	"Gaivotas de um mar revolto"	—N/a
2	Vanda	"África"	—N/a
3	Raquel Alão	"Quando eu te beijo"	Qualified

Semi-final 3 – 8 February 1997
R/O	Artist	Song	Result
1	Cristina Almeida	"Senhora da saia verde"	Qualified
2	Paulo Caetano	"Sons de festa"	—N/a
3	Água Mole	"Pedra dura"	—N/a

Semi-final 4 – 15 February 1997
R/O	Artist	Song	Result
1	Paula Cardoso and Carlos Ançã	"Sonhos de verão"	—N/a
2	Telmo Miranda	"Madrigal de Lianor"	Qualified
3	Carlos Alberto Vidal	"Menino de rua"	—N/a

Semi-final 5 – 22 February 1997
R/O	Artist	Song	Result
1	Susana Pinto	"Rosa dos ventos"	—N/a
2	Filipa Lourenço	"Quadro sonhador"	Qualified
3	Ema and Isabel Viana	"Corrente da terra mãe"	—N/a

==== Final ====
The final took place at the Coliseu dos Recreios in Lisbon on 7 March 1997, hosted by António Sala and Cristina Caras Lindas. The five entries that qualified from the five preceding semi-finals alongside the three pre-qualifying entries competed and the winner, "Antes do adeus" performed by Célia Lawson, was selected based on the combination of votes of 20 regional juries and a public televote which acted as a 21st jury. In addition to the performances of the competing entries, among the artists which performed as the interval act included Portuguese Eurovision 1965 and 1969 entrant Simone de Oliveira and Portuguese Eurovision 1971 entrant Tonicha.

Final – 7 March 1997
R/O	Artist	Song	Conductor	Points	Place
1	Oriundi	"Nosso canto chão"	Ramon Galarza	65	8
2	Raquel Alão	"Quando eu te beijo"	Pedro Duarte	115	3
3	Cristina Almeida	"Senhora da saia verde"	José Marinho	104	5
4	Telmo Miranda	"Madrigal de Lianor"	José Marinho	111	4
5	Os Meninos da Sacristia	"Canção urgente"	Mike Sergeant	102	6
6	Sónia Mendes	"Da primeira vez"	Pedro Duarte	116	2
7	Célia Lawson	"Antes do adeus"	Thilo Krasmann	127	1
8	Susana Pinto	"Rosa dos ventos"	Simon Wadsworth	79	7

Detailed Voting Results
R/O	Song	Aveiro	Beja	Braga	Bragança	Castelo Branco	Coimbra	Évora	Faro	Madeira	Guarda	Leiria	Lisbon	Azores	Portalegre	Porto	Santarém	Setúbal	Viana do Castelo	Vila Real	Viseu	Televote	Total
1	"Nosso canto chão"	1	1	5	1	2	1	6	5	3	6	8	6	2	6	1	2	1	2	1	4	1	65
2	"Quando eu te beijo"	8	4	4	3	1	4	10	6	10	8	3	1	6	8	6	4	5	10	5	6	3	115
3	"Senhora da saia verde"	4	2	3	8	6	5	4	8	2	1	10	10	4	2	2	5	2	5	6	10	5	104
4	"Madrigal de Lianor"	5	3	8	10	10	10	3	2	4	4	5	3	8	1	5	8	4	3	10	3	2	111
5	"Canção urgente"	6	10	1	2	4	2	2	1	1	10	6	2	5	10	4	6	8	1	3	8	10	102
6	"Da primeira vez"	10	8	2	4	5	8	5	3	6	3	4	8	1	3	8	10	10	6	4	2	6	116
7	"Antes do adeus"	3	6	6	5	8	6	8	10	5	5	2	4	10	5	10	3	6	4	8	5	8	127
8	"Rosa dos ventos"	2	5	10	6	3	3	1	4	8	2	1	5	3	4	3	1	3	8	2	1	4	79

== At Eurovision ==
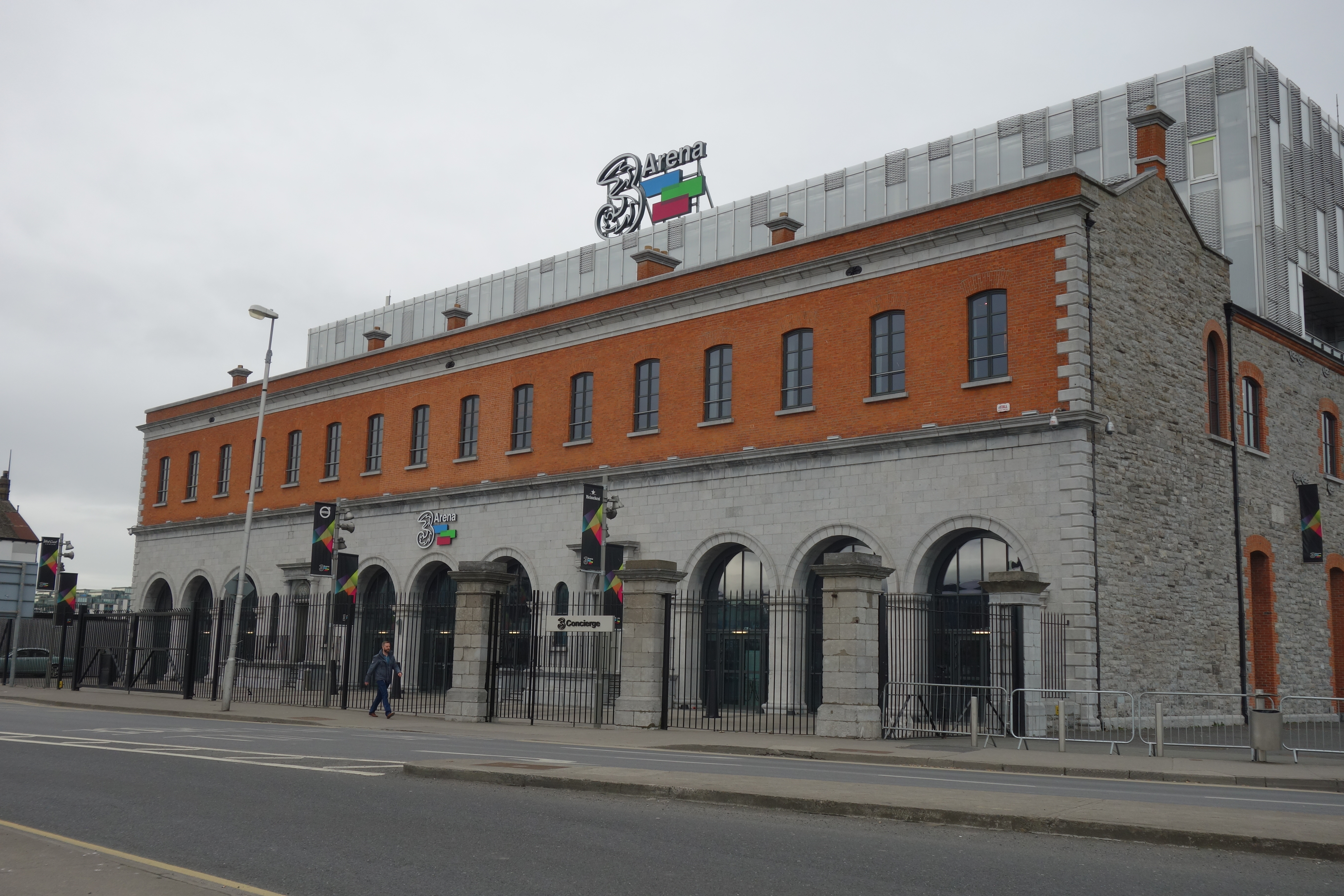
The Eurovision Song Contest 1997 took place at the Point Theatre in Dublin, Ireland, on 3 May 1997.

According to Eurovision rules, the twenty-four countries which had obtained the highest average number of points over the last four contests competed in the final on 3 May 1997. On 28 November 1996, an allocation draw was held which determined the running order and Portugal was set to perform in position 15, following the entry from Bosnia and Herzegovina and before the entry from Sweden. The Portuguese conductor at the contest was the co-composer of "Antes do adeus" Thilo Krasmann, and Portugal finished in twenty-fourth (last) place failing to score any points. This was the third time Portugal finished in last place and the second time the nation received nul points, the previous occasion being in 1964.

In Portugal, the show was broadcast on RTP1 and RTP Internacional with commentary by Carlos Ribeiro. The Portuguese spokesperson, who announced the votes of the Portuguese jury, was Cristina Rocha.

=== Voting ===
Portugal did not receive any points at the 1997 Eurovision Song Contest. The nation awarded its 12 points to Italy in the contest with the full breakdown of points awarded by Portugal displayed below.

Points awarded by Portugal
Score	Country
12 points	Italy
10 points	Ireland
8 points	Spain
7 points	United Kingdom
6 points	France
5 points	Turkey
4 points	Slovenia
3 points	Cyprus
2 points	Poland
1 point	Estonia
