= Switzerland in the Eurovision Song Contest 1997 =

- Eurovision Song Contest 1997
- Participating broadcaster: Swiss Broadcasting Corporation (SRG SSR)
- Country: Switzerland
- Selection process: Internal selection
- Announcement date: 20 February 1997

Competing entry
- Song: "Dentro di me"
- Artist: Barbara Berta
- Songwriters: Barbara Berta

Placement
- Final result: 22nd, 5 points

Participation chronology

Switzerland was represented at the Eurovision Song Contest 1997 with the song "Dentro di me", written and performed by Barbara Berta. The Swiss participating broadcaster, the Swiss Broadcasting Corporation (SRG SSR), selected its entry through an internal selection.

== Before Eurovision ==
=== Internal selection ===
The Swiss Broadcasting Corporation (SRG SSR) held an internal selection to select its entry for the Eurovision Song Contest 1997. Since 1994, the broadcaster selected its entries for Eurovision internally due to the low publicity and high expenses on their national finals.

The internal selection took place on 19 February in Zurich, where nine songs were presented after presumably being shortlisted, with three songs in French and German, two in Italian, and one in Romansh. It is unknown how many total songs were submitted.

On the following day, it was first reported that the selected song was "Dentro di me," written and performed by Barbara Berta. Both songs in Italian are known and their results are listed in the chart below.

Internal selection (known songs) — 19 February 1997
Artist(s)	Song	Songwriter		Language	Place
Artist(s)	Song	Composer	Lyricist	Language	Place
Barbara Berta	"Dentro di me"	Barbara Berta		Italian	1
Ramona Cerutti	"Brivido"	Daniela Zerbinati		Italian	3

== At Eurovision ==
At the Eurovision Song Contest 1997, held at the Point Theatre in Dublin, the Swiss entry was the seventh entry of the night following Slovenia and preceding the Netherlands. The Swiss conductor at the contest was Pietro Damiani. At the close of voting, Switzerland had only received 5 points in total; finishing in twenty-second place out of twenty-five countries.

=== Voting ===
This year, a new "televoting" system was introduced, in which five countries had their viewers vote their favorite songs from their country rather than those countries using jurors. The countries that utilized the new televote system were Austria, Germany, Sweden, the United Kingdom, and Switzerland. The remaining participating broadcasters still assembled a jury panel with at least eleven members. All countries awarded 1-8, 10, and 12 points to their top ten songs.

Points awarded to Switzerland
Score	Country
12 points	
10 points	
8 points	
7 points	
6 points	
5 points	
4 points	
3 points	Spain
2 points	Italy
1 point	

Points awarded by Switzerland
Score	Country
12 points	United Kingdom
10 points	Italy
8 points	Spain
7 points	Ireland
6 points	Turkey
5 points	Germany
4 points	Cyprus
3 points	France
2 points	Bosnia and Herzegovina
1 point	Denmark
