= Hungary in the Eurovision Song Contest 1997 =

- Eurovision Song Contest 1997
- Participating broadcaster: Magyar Televízió (MTV)
- Country: Hungary
- Selection process: National final
- Selection date: 28 February 1997

Competing entry
- Song: "Miért kell, hogy elmenj?"
- Artist: V.I.P.
- Songwriters: Viktor Rakonczai; Krisztina Bokor Fekete

Placement
- Final result: 12th, 39 points

Participation chronology

Hungary was represented at the Eurovision Song Contest 1997 with the song "Miért kell, hogy elmenj?", composed by Viktor Rakonczai, with lyrics by Krisztina Bokor Fekete, and performed by the band V.I.P. The Hungarian participating broadcaster, Magyar Televízió (MTV), selected its entry through a national final.

== Before Eurovision ==
=== National final ===
Magyar Televízió (MTV) held the national final on 28 February 1997 at its television studios in Budapest, hosted by István Vágó. 19 songs took part with the winner being chosen by voting from five regional juries, who each awarded 10-7-5-3-1 to their top five songs.

Final – 28 February 1997
R/O	Artist	Song	Points	Place
1	Rockfort	"Jolly"	14	3
2	Marianna Rozsi	"Nem bújhatsz el"	0	14
3	Adrienne Almási	"Eltévedt üzenet"	0	14
4	Szerda Délután	"Valami eltűnt"	0	14
5	Melinda and Lui	"Talán"	0	14
6	Orsi	"Választok egy csillagot"	10	6
7	V.I.P.	"Miért kell, hogy elmenj?"	27	1
8	Orsolya Ferencz	"Ne bántsd a feketerigót"	0	14
9	CET	"Egy pillanat volt"	12	5
10	Péter Popper	"Szavak nélkül"	5	9
11	Veronika Nádasi	"Tavasz a télben"	21	2
12	Csilla Auth	"Nem lehet az utolsó az első szerelem"	3	11
13	Dina	"Ugye szólsz"	5	9
14	Cotton Club Singers	"Úgy szeress, mint én"	8	7
15	Gábor Majsai	"Mitől olvad a szíved fel?"	3	11
16	Harvest	"A hatordik sorban"	0	14
17	Yellow Rebel	"Csak te legyél"	1	13
18	Tamas Takáts	"Újra itt volnál"	8	7
19	Renáta Krassy	"Dal neked"	13	4

Detailed Regional Jury Votes
R/O	Song	Debrecen	Szeged	Pécs	Szombathely	Budapest	Total
1	"Jolly"	10			1	3	14
2	"Nem bújhatsz el"						0
3	"Eltévedt üzenet"						0
4	"Valami eltűnt"						0
5	"Talán"						0
6	"Választok egy csillagot"					10	10
7	"Miért kell, hogy elmenj?"	3		10	7	7	27
8	"Ne bántsd a feketerigót"						0
9	"Egy pillanat volt"		7			5	12
10	"Szavak nélkül"	5					5
11	"Tavasz a télben"	1	10		10		21
12	"Nem lehet az utolsó az első szerelem"		3				3
13	"Ugye szólsz"			5			5
14	"Úgy szeress, mint én"		5		3		8
15	"Mitől olvad a szíved fel?"			3			3
16	"A hatordik sorban"						0
17	"Csak te legyél"			1			1
18	"Újra itt volnál"		1	7			8
19	"Dal neked"	7			5	1	13

== At Eurovision ==
On the night of the final V.I.P. performed 19th in the running order, following Malta and preceding Russia. At the close of voting "Miért kell, hogy elmenj?" had picked up 39 points, placing Hungary joint 12th (with Greece) of the 25 entries. The Hungarian jury awarded its 12 points to contest winners the United Kingdom.

=== Voting ===
Points awarded to Hungary
Score	Country
12 points	
10 points	
8 points	United Kingdom
7 points	
6 points	
5 points	Estonia; France; Iceland; Poland
4 points	Ireland
3 points	Turkey
2 points	Croatia; Malta
1 point	

Points awarded by Hungary
Score	Country
12 points	United Kingdom
10 points	Spain
8 points	Ireland
7 points	Poland
6 points	Turkey
5 points	Austria
4 points	Estonia
3 points	Italy
2 points	France
1 point	Germany
