= Slovenia in the Eurovision Song Contest 1997 =

- Eurovision Song Contest 1997
- Participating broadcaster: Radiotelevizija Slovenija (RTVSLO)
- Country: Slovenia
- Selection process: Evrovizijska Melodija 1997
- Selection date: 22 February 1997

Competing entry
- Song: "Zbudi se"
- Artist: Tanja Ribič
- Songwriters: Saša Lošić; Zoran Predin

Placement
- Final result: 10th, 60 points

Participation chronology

Slovenia was represented at the Eurovision Song Contest 1997 with the song "Zbudi se", composed by Saša Lošić, with lyrics by Zoran Predin, and performed by Tanja Ribič. The Slovene participating broadcaster, Radiotelevizija Slovenija (RTVSLO), held the national final Evrovizijska Melodija 1997 in order to select its entry for the contest. 13 entries competed in the national final where "Zbudi se" performed by Tanja Ribič was selected as the winner entirely by a public televote.

Slovenia participated in the Eurovision Song Contest held on 3 May 1997. Performing in the 6th position, Slovenia finished tenth out of the 25 competing countries, earning a total of 60 points.

== Background ==
Prior to the 1997 contest, Radiotelevizija Slovenija (RTVSLO) had participated in the Eurovision Song Contest representing Slovenia three times since its first entry in 1993. Its highest placing in the contest, to this point, has been seventh place, achieved in 1995 with the song "Prisluhni mi" performed by Darja Švajger. In 1996, "Dan najlepših sanj" performed by Regina placed twenty-first.

As part of its duties as participating broadcaster, RTVSLO organises the selection of its entry in the Eurovision Song Contest and broadcasts the event in the country. The broadcaster has traditionally selected its entry through a national final entitled Evrovizijska Melodija (EMA), which has been produced with variable formats. For 1997, the broadcaster opted to organise Evrovizijska Melodija 1997 (EMA 1997) to select its entry.

== Before Eurovision ==
=== Evrovizijska Melodija 1997 ===
Evrovizijska Melodija 1997 (EMA 1997) was the third edition of the Slovenian national final format Evrovizijska Melodija. RTVSLO held the competition on 22 February 1997 at its television Studio 1 in Ljubljana, hosted by Mojca Mavec and broadcast on SLO 1.

==== Competing entries ====
An expert committee consisting of music editors for Radio Slovenija as well as representatives of ZKP RTV Slovenija and the Union of the Slovenian Musicians nominated 19 composers. Each member of the expert committee assigned a score of 1 (lowest score) to 7 (highest score) to their seven preferred composers with the top eight that received the highest overall scores when the votes were combined being directly invited by the broadcaster to submit up to two entries (one upbeat song and/or one ballad) by 20 December 1996. The invited composers were: Matjaž Vlašič, Aleš Klinar, Saša Lošić, Danilo Kocjančič, Veno Dolenc, Primož Peterca, Sašo Fajon and Slavko Avsenik Jr. A total of thirteen songs were created and selected for the competition and among the competing artists was Darja Švajger who represented Slovenia in 1995.

==== Final ====
Evrovizijska Melodija 1997 took place on 22 February 1997. In addition to the performances of the competing entries, Norina Radovan performed as a guest. A public televote selected "Zbudi se" performed by Tanja Ribič as the winner.

Final – 22 February 1997
R/O	Artist	Song	Songwriter(s)	Votes	Place
1	Natalija Verboten	"Nekdo"	Matjaž Vlašič, Urša Vlašič	265	12
2	Dominik Kozarič	"Zaradi nje"	Aleš Klinar, Dominik Kozarič	650	9
3	Tanja Ribič	"Zbudi se"	Saša Lošić, Zoran Predin	4,493	1
4	Tinkara Kovač	"Veter z juga"	Danilo Kocjančič, Drago Mislej	574	10
5	Irena Vrčkovnik	"Kadar boš ob njej zaspal"	Matjaž Vlašič, Urša Vlašič	1,010	7
6	Melita and Klarisa	"Daljave"	Veno Dolenc, Kajetan Kovič	512	11
7	Grom	"Le en poljub"	Slavko Avsenik Jr., Mirjam Beranek	895	8
8	Napoleon	"Prosim ostani"	Aleš Klinar, Anja Rupel	1,794	5
9	Katrina	"Korak v dežju"	Primož Peterca, Rok Golob, Katarina Habe	213	13
10	Rok 'n' Band	"Jagode in čokolada"	Saša Lošić, Janez Zmazek	2,226	3
11	Darja Švajger	"Vsakdanji čudež"	Primož Peterca	4,076	2
12	Vili Resnik	"Ti in jaz"	Sašo Fajon, Vili Resnik	1,521	6
13	M4M	"Objemi me nežno"	Slavko Avsenik Jr., Mirjam Beranek	2,047	4

== At Eurovision ==
According to Eurovision rules, the twenty-four countries which had obtained the highest average number of points over the last four contests competed in the final on 3 May 1997. On 28 November 1996, an allocation draw was held which determined the running order and Slovenia was set to perform in position 6, following the entry from Ireland and before the entry from Switzerland. The Slovenian conductor at the contest was Mojmir Sepe, and Slovenia finished in tenth place with 60 points.

The show was televised in Slovenia on RTV SLO1. RTVSLO appointed Mojca Mavec as its spokesperson to announce the Slovenian votes during the show.

=== Voting ===
Below is a breakdown of points awarded to Slovenia and awarded by Slovenia in the contest. The nation awarded its 12 points to Russia in the contest.

Points awarded to Slovenia
Score	Country
12 points	
10 points	Russia; Turkey
8 points	
7 points	Bosnia and Herzegovina; France
6 points	
5 points	Malta
4 points	Estonia; Portugal
3 points	Croatia; Greece; Iceland
2 points	Cyprus; Poland
1 point	

Points awarded by Slovenia
Score	Country
12 points	Russia
10 points	Italy
8 points	United Kingdom
7 points	Poland
6 points	Sweden
5 points	Spain
4 points	Cyprus
3 points	Estonia
2 points	France
1 point	Ireland
