= Croatia in the Eurovision Song Contest 1997 =

- Eurovision Song Contest 1997
- Participating broadcaster: Croatian Radiotelevision (HRT)
- Country: Croatia
- Selection process: Dora 1997
- Selection date: 9 March 1997

Competing entry
- Song: "Probudi me"
- Artist: E.N.I.
- Songwriters: Davor Tolja; Alida Šarar

Placement
- Final result: 17th, 24 points

Participation chronology

Croatia was represented at the Eurovision Song Contest 1997 with the song "Probudi me", composed by Davor Tolja, with lyrics by Alida Šarar, and performed by the band E.N.I. The Croatian participating broadcaster, Croatian Radiotelevision (HRT), selected its entry for the contest through Dora 1997.

== Background ==
Croatia first appeared in the Eurovision Song Contest as an independent country in 1993, having previously entered as a part of Yugoslavia from 1961 to 1991. The sub-national broadcaster from SR Croatia was the most successful at the national finals, with 11 of the 27 entries that won the Yugoslavian selection for Eurovision being Croatian. It gave Yugoslavia three of the country's Top 5 placings in the contest, with "Rock Me" performed by Riva winning the 1989 contest, as well as fourth-place finishes for both "Džuli" by Daniel in 1983 and "Ja sam za ples" by Novi fosili in 1987.

Croatia's former sub-national broadcaster RTV Zagreb became the country's national broadcaster after independence, renamed Croatian Radiotelevision (Croatian: Hrvatska radiotelevizija; HRT). 1997 marked HRT's fifth participation at the contest representing Croatia as an independent country. Previous results for Croatia were mixed, with its first two entries gaining 15th and 16th position. However its entries from 1995 and 1996 both placed within the top 10, with "Nostalgija" by Magazin and Lidija placing 6th in 1995 and "Sveta ljubav" by Maja Blagdan placing 4th in 1996.

== Before Eurovision ==
=== Dora 1997 ===
HRT held a national final to select its entry for the Eurovision Song Contest 1997. The broadcaster held Dora 1997 on 9 March at the Crystal Ballroom of Hotel Kvarner in Opatija, hosted by Ljudevit Grgurić Grga. 20 entries competed, and the winner was decided by 20 regional juries.

Final – 9 March 1997
R/O	Artist	Song	Songwriter(s)	Points	Place
1	Tajana	"Povedi me"	Ivan Mikulić, Fayo	0	19
2	Ksenija Sobotinčić	"Nemamo to pravo"	Andrej Babić	6	17
3	Oliver Dragojević	"Lučija"	Zdenko Runjić, Ivana Runjić, Vedrana Runjić	62	8
4	Bay Bis	"Boje ljubavi"	Zrinko Tutić	0	19
5	Branka B.	"Našoj ljubavi"	Zlatan Stipišić Gibonni, Zlatan Stipišić Gibonni, Nenad Ninčević	4	18
6	Magazin	"Opium"	Tonći Huljić, Vjekoslava Huljić	64	7
7	Ivana Plechinger	"Zora"	Ivana Plechinger, Bruno Kovačić	52	9
8	E.N.I.	"Probudi me"	Davor Tolja, Alida Šarar	170	1
9	Donna Ares	"Zadnja noć"	Guido Mineo, Ivana Mavrin, Robert Pilepić	48	12
10	Petar Grašo	"Idi"	Petar Grašo	161	2
11	Lidija Bajuk	"Zora djevojka"	Lidija Bajuk	79	5
12	Lana Cenčić	"Ti si super, ti si mrak"	Lana Cenčić, Fayo	7	16
13	Brešković Brothers	"Voljet ću te vječno"	Tonći Brešković, Nikola Brešković, Marko Brešković	52	9
14	Novi fosili	"Vrijeme"	Rajko Dujmi, Fayo	52	9
15	Minea	"Magla"	Fedor Boic, Vjekoslava Huljić	27	14
16	Maja Blagdan	"Za nas"	Nenad Ninčević	134	3
17	Leo	"Moje nebo"	Đorđe Novković, Štefanija Soldan, Eduard Matešić	66	6
18	Dražen Žanko	"Zamantan"	Dražen Žanko	23	15
19	Ivan Mikulić	"Proljeće"	Miro Buljan, Fayo	36	13
20	Alen Nižetić	"Ti"	Nenad Ninčević	117	4

Detailed Regional Jury Votes
R/O	Song	Bjelovar	Čakovec	Dubrovnik	Gospić	Karlovac	Koprivnica	Krapina	Osijek	Pazin	Požega	Rijeka	Sisak	Slavonski Brod	Split	Šibenik	Varaždin	Virovitica	Vukovar	Zadar	Zagreb	Total
1	"Povedi me"																					0
2	"Nemamo to pravo"										2							3			1	6
3	"Lučija"				1	6	1	6	7		4	8	2	5	3	5		2		12		62
4	"Boje ljubavi"																					0
5	"Našoj ljubavi"							4														4
6	"Opium"		5		6	3			6		12	5		4	4	7	8		1		3	64
7	"Zora"	8		2	3		3				8	3			7			6			12	52
8	"Probudi me"	12	12	4	10	8	8		10	7	10	12	7	8	10	8	12	12	2	10	8	170
9	"Zadnja noć"	7			2			1	3				1	7		3	5	4	5	6	4	48
10	"Idi"	6	8	12	12	10	7	12	12	3		10	12	1	5	10	10	7	10	7	7	161
11	"Zora djevojka"	5	7			2	5			2	3	6	10	12	12			10			5	79
12	"Ti si super, ti si mrak"									1			6									7
13	"Voljet ću te vječno"		6	10		5		2		12		1	5	3		1	7					52
14	"Vrijeme"	4	1	1	5	7	2	5	1		7	2			1	4	1		8	3		52
15	"Magla"						4			8							3		6	4	2	27
16	"Za nas"	10	10	8	7	1	12	7	5	5	1	7		10	8	6	6	8	12	5	6	134
17	"Moje nebo"	3		3		4	6	8	4	10			3	2			4	5	4		10	66
18	"Zamantan"		4	6				3		4						2	2			2		23
19	"Proljeće"	2	3	5	8				2		6		4		2				3	1		36
20	"Ti"	1	2	7	4	12	10	10	8	6	5	4	8	6	6	12		1	7	8		117

== At Eurovision ==
E.N.I. performed 23rd on the night of the contest, following France and preceding the United Kingdom. The group received 24 points, placing 17th of the 25 competing countries.

=== Voting ===
Points awarded to Croatia
Score	Country
12 points	
10 points	
8 points	Malta
7 points	
6 points	
5 points	Sweden
4 points	Cyprus
3 points	Poland
2 points	Bosnia and Herzegovina
1 point	Germany; United Kingdom

Points awarded by Croatia
Score	Country
12 points	United Kingdom
10 points	Italy
8 points	Malta
7 points	Greece
6 points	Ireland
5 points	Germany
4 points	Cyprus
3 points	Slovenia
2 points	Hungary
1 point	Bosnia and Herzegovina
