= Ireland in the Eurovision Song Contest 1997 =

- Eurovision Song Contest 1997
- Participating broadcaster: Radio Telefís Éireann (RTÉ)
- Country: Ireland
- Selection process: Eurosong '97
- Selection date: 9 March 1997

Competing entry
- Song: "Mysterious Woman"
- Artist: Marc Roberts
- Songwriter: John Farry

Placement
- Final result: 2nd, 157 points

Participation chronology

Ireland was represented at the Eurovision Song Contest 1997 with the song "Mysterious Woman", written by John Farry, and performed by Marc Roberts. The Irish participating broadcaster, Radio Telefís Éireann (RTÉ), selected its entry through a national final. In addition, RTÉ was also the host broadcaster for the fourth time in five years and staged the event at the Point Theatre in Dublin, for the third time in four years, after winning the previous edition with the song "The Voice" by Eimear Quinn.

== Before Eurovision ==
=== Eurosong '97 ===
==== Réalta '97 ====
Réalta was a radio song contest started in 1995 by RTÉ Raidió na Gaeltachta exclusively for Irish songs. The first edition of the contest was not related to Eurosong, but from 1996 until 1999, the recent winner of Réalta would qualify to Eurosong. The 3rd edition of Réalta took place on 22 November 1996. The running order and some of the results of Réalta '97 are unknown.

Artist	Song	Songwriter(s)	Place
Aidan Coleman	"Slán go fóill"	Aidan Coleman, Pádraig Mac Fhearghusa	—
Ann Marie Nic Dhonnchadha	"An t-earrach"	Pádraig Ó Conghaile, Ann Marie Nic Dhonnchadha	—
Art Ó Dufaigh	"Gairm na seirce"	Art Ó Dufaigh	—
Barry Ronan	"Cailín álainn"	P.J. Flaherty, Eugene Killeen	—
Evelyn Curry	"Carnán cloch"	Cathal Ó Catháin, Evelyn Curry	—
Helen Uí Dhunáird	"Uaigneas"	Seán Ó Coistealbha, Helen Uí Dhunáird, Jane Simmons, Steven Simmons	1
Mícheál Ó hAllmhúráin	"Tógaigí sos"	Siobhán Ní Mhurchú, Mícheál Ó hAllmhúráin	—
Nioclás Breathnach	"Saol búca"	Nioclás Breathnach	—
Seán Monaghan	"Cáwockatú"	Seán Monaghan, Danny Monaghan, Maoilre de Búrca	2
Tadhg Mac Dhonnagáin	"Seo an talamh"	Tadhg Mac Dhonnagáin	—

==== Final ====
RTÉ held Eurosong '97 on 9 March 1997 at the Institute of Technology in Waterford, hosted by Pat Kenny. Eight entries competed in the final and the winner, "Mysterious Woman" performed by Marc Roberts, was determined by the votes of ten regional juries.

Final – 9 March 1997
R/O	Artist	Song	Songwriter(s)	Points	Place
1	Tommy Quinn	"Good Life"	Teresa Keogh	59	5
2	Miranda	"I Am Here"	Jim Walsh	48	7
3	Darren Holden	"Suddenly"	Darren Holden	91	2
4	Michelle Costelloe	"Never Far Away"	Michelle Costelloe	45	8
5	Helen Uí Dhúnaird	"Uaigneas"	Seán Ó Coisdealbha, Helen Uí Dhunáird, Jane Simmons, Steven Simmons	54	6
6	Gary O'Shaughnessy	"Love and Understanding"	Michael Heffernan, Kevin Smith	87	3
7	Maggie Toal	"My Love"	Tony Adams-Rosa	67	4
8	Marc Roberts	"Mysterious Woman"	John Farry	99	1

Detailed Regional Jury Votes
R/O	Song	Athlone	Ballybunion	Cork	Dublin	Dundalk	Galway	Killybegs	Limerick	Sligo	Waterford	Total
1	"Good Life"	6	4	7	6	6	8	6	8	5	3	59
2	"I Am Here"	5	3	5	8	3	3	3	5	3	10	48
3	"Suddenly"	10	8	10	12	7	6	10	4	12	12	91
4	"Never Far Away"	3	5	3	4	5	4	4	6	4	7	45
5	"Uaigneas"	4	7	4	3	4	10	5	3	6	8	54
6	"Love and Understanding"	8	10	8	10	8	12	7	10	10	4	87
7	"My Love"	7	6	6	5	10	5	8	7	8	5	67
8	"Mysterious Woman"	12	12	12	7	12	7	12	12	7	6	99

== At Eurovision ==
Roberts performed 5th in the running order on the night of the contest. "Mysterious Woman" went on to be placed 2nd with 157 points. To date, this was the last time that the Irish entry placed in the top five.

=== Voting ===
Points awarded to Ireland
Score	Country
12 points	United Kingdom
10 points	Austria; Denmark; France; Italy; Portugal; Sweden
8 points	Bosnia and Herzegovina; Cyprus; Estonia; Germany; Hungary
7 points	Poland; Switzerland
6 points	Croatia; Spain; Turkey
5 points	Russia
4 points	Netherlands
3 points	Norway
2 points	
1 point	Slovenia

Points awarded by Ireland
Score	Country
12 points	United Kingdom
10 points	France
8 points	Estonia
7 points	Malta
6 points	Spain
5 points	Sweden
4 points	Hungary
3 points	Cyprus
2 points	Turkey
1 point	Italy
