= Iceland in the Eurovision Song Contest 1997 =

- Eurovision Song Contest 1997
- Participating broadcaster: Ríkisútvarpið (RÚV)
- Country: Iceland
- Selection process: Internal selection
- Announcement date: Artist: 27 February 1997; Song: 11 March 1997

Competing entry
- Song: "Minn hinsti dans"
- Artist: Paul Oscar
- Songwriters: Páll Óskar Hjálmtýsson; Trausti Haraldsson

Placement
- Final result: 20th, 18 points

Participation chronology

Iceland was represented at the Eurovision Song Contest 1997 with the song "Minn hinsti dans", written by Trausti Haraldsson and Páll Óskar Hjálmtýsson, and performed by Hjálmtýsson himself under his artistic name Paul Oscar. The Icelandic participating broadcaster, Ríkisútvarpið (RÚV), internally selected its entry for the contest in February 1997. The song was presented to the public on 11 March 1997.

Iceland competed in the Eurovision Song Contest which took place on 29 May 1997. Iceland was the closing performance of the show in position 25 and the nation placed twentieth out of the 25 participating countries, scoring 18 points.

== Background ==
Prior to the 1997 contest, Ríkisútvarpið (RÚV) had participated in the Eurovision Song Contest representing Iceland eleven times since its first entry in 1986. Its best placing in the contest to this point was fourth, achieved in 1990 with the song "Eitt lag enn" performed by Stjórnin. In 1996, it placed thirteenth with the song "Sjúbídú" performed by Anna Mjöll.

As part of its duties as participating broadcaster, RÚV organises the selection of its entry in the Eurovision Song Contest and broadcasts the event in the country. Since 1995, it had internally selected its entry for the contest, a method that continued for its 1997 participation.

== Before Eurovision ==
=== Internal selection ===
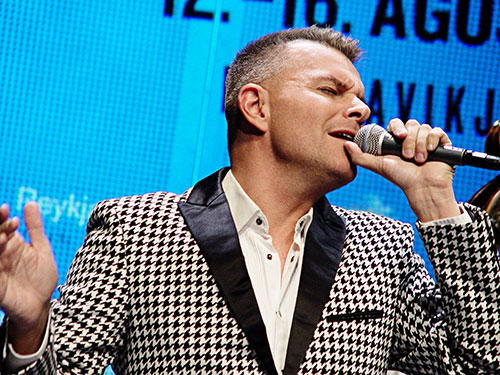
Paul Oscar was internally selected to represent Iceland in the Eurovision Song Contest 1997

RÚV internally selected its entry for the Eurovision Song Contest 1997. On 27 February 1997, the broadcaster announced Páll Óskar Hjálmtýsson (under the stage name Paul Oscar) as its representative. It was also announced that the song he would perform, which was described as "extraordinarily unusual for Eurovision", was composed by Trausti Haraldsson and Paul Oscar who also wrote the lyrics himself. In regards to his selection as the Icelandic entrant, Paul Oscar stated: "I intend to grab the most attention from viewers and entertain myself royally... It's no problem to put on a show for 500 million people. I feel better as the millions increase." The song, "Minn hinsti dans", was presented to the public on 11 March 1997 on Rás 2, while its music video was presented on 21 March 1997 during the television programme Dagsljós.

== At Eurovision ==
According to Eurovision rules, the twenty-four countries which had obtained the highest average number of points over the last four contests competed in the final on 3 May 1997. On 28 November 1996, an allocation draw was held which determined the running order and Iceland was set to perform last in position 25, following the entry from the United Kingdom.

The Icelandic performance featured Paul Oscar surrounded by four female dancers (Guðrún Kaldal, Helena Jónsdóttir, Hlíf Þorgeirsdóttir and Ingibjörg Agnes Jónsdóttir) performing an erotic routine in latex outfits. The Icelandic conductor was Szymon Kuran, and Iceland finished in twentieth place with 18 points, 16 of them which came from three of the five participating countries that used televoting for the first time to determine their points – Austria, Sweden, and the United Kingdom.

The contest was broadcast in Iceland on RÚV with commentary by Jakob Frímann Magnússon. RÚV appointed Svanhildur Konráðsdóttir as its spokesperson to announce the Icelandic votes.

=== Voting ===
Below is a breakdown of points awarded to Iceland and awarded by Iceland in the contest. The nation awarded its 12 points to Cyprus in the contest.

Points awarded to Iceland
Score	Country
12 points	
10 points	
8 points	Sweden
7 points	
6 points	United Kingdom
5 points	
4 points	
3 points	
2 points	Austria; Estonia
1 point	

Points awarded by Iceland
Score	Country
12 points	Cyprus
10 points	France
8 points	United Kingdom
7 points	Turkey
6 points	Denmark
5 points	Hungary
4 points	Sweden
3 points	Slovenia
2 points	Estonia
1 point	Italy
