= Bosnia and Herzegovina in the Eurovision Song Contest 1997 =

- Eurovision Song Contest 1997
- Participating broadcaster: Radiotelevision of Bosnia-Herzegovina (RTVBiH)
- Country: Bosnia and Herzegovina
- Selection process: Artist: Internal selection Song: BH Eurosong 1997
- Selection date: 22 February 1997

Competing entry
- Song: "Goodbye"
- Artist: Alma Čardžić
- Songwriters: Milić Vukašinović; Sinan Alimanović

Placement
- Final result: 18th, 22 points

Participation chronology

Bosnia and Herzegovina was represented at the Eurovision Song Contest 1997 with the song "Goodbye", written by Milić Vukašinović and Sinan Alimanović, and performed by Alma Čardžić. The Bosnian-Herzegovinian participating broadcaster, Radiotelevision of Bosnia-Herzegovina (RTVBiH), selected its entry for the contest through a national final, after having previously selected the performer internally. They finished in an 18th place out of 25 countries with 22 points, sharing this placement with Germany, as the tie-breaking rule at the time only affected the first place.

== Before Eurovision ==
According to the then Eurovision rules, all nations with the exceptions of the eight countries which had obtained the lowest average number of points over the last four contests competed in the Eurovision Song Contest 1997. Bosnia and Herzegovina was originally relegated for being one of the eight lowest scoring countries, but after Israel withdrew from the contest, as the contest was held on its Holocaust Remembrance Day, their place awarded to Bosnia and Herzegovina, who ultimately competed.

=== BH Eurosong 1997 ===
Radiotelevision of Bosnia-Herzegovina (RTVBiH) held the national final on 22 February 1997 at its television Studios in Sarajevo. Alma Čardžić sang all the songs and the winner was chosen by an expert jury.

Final – 22 February 1997
R/O	Song	Songwriter(s)
1	"Godine"	Igor Karača, Safet-Sajo Selimović
2	"Zbog tebe"	Jasmina Kapić
3	"Još uvijek te volim"	Faruk Hasanbegović, Safet Plakalo
4	"Interpol"	Suad Jukić, Esad Purić
5	"SOS"	Suad Jukić, Milić Vukašinović
6	"U tvojim očima"	Eldin Huseinbegović, Omar Krasnić
7	"Goodbye"	Milić Vukašinović, Sinan Alimanović
8	"Ostani"	Milić Vukašinović
9	"Oprosti mi"	Milić Vukašinović
10	"Baybe-be"	Jaka Osmanagić

== At Eurovision ==
Alma Čardžić performed 14th on the night of the contest, following Estonia and preceding Portugal. At the close of voting it had received 22 points, placing joint 18th (with Germany) out of 25 entries. Due to a low average score over the past 5 contests, Bosnia and Herzegovina was forced to sit out the 1998 contest. The country returned to Eurovision in 1999.

=== Voting ===
Points awarded to Bosnia and Herzegovina
Score	Country
12 points	
10 points	
8 points	Turkey
7 points	
6 points	
5 points	
4 points	Austria; Sweden
3 points	Germany
2 points	Switzerland
1 point	Croatia

Points awarded by Bosnia and Herzegovina
Score	Country
12 points	Turkey
10 points	United Kingdom
8 points	Ireland
7 points	Slovenia
6 points	Italy
5 points	Malta
4 points	Poland
3 points	France
2 points	Croatia
1 point	Estonia
