= Norway in the Eurovision Song Contest 1997 =

- Eurovision Song Contest 1997
- Participating broadcaster: Norsk rikskringkasting (NRK)
- Country: Norway
- Selection process: Melodi Grand Prix 1997
- Selection date: 8 February 1997

Competing entry
- Song: "San Francisco"
- Artist: Tor Endresen
- Songwriters: Tor Endresen; Arne Myksvoll

Placement
- Final result: 24th, 0 points

Participation chronology

Norway was represented at the Eurovision Song Contest 1997 with the song "San Francisco", written by Tor Endresen and Arne Myksvoll, and performed by Endresen himself. The Norwegian participating broadcaster, Norsk rikskringkasting (NRK), organised the national final Melodi Grand Prix 1997 in order to select its entry for the contest. Eight entries competed in a show that took place on 8 February 1997 and the winner, "San Francisco" performed by Tor Endresen, was determined by the votes from a six-member jury panel and a public televote. Endresen won Melodi Grand Prix on his eighth attempt.

Norway competed in the Eurovision Song Contest which took place on 3 May 1997. Performing during the show in position 3, Norway placed twenty-fourth (joint last) out of the 25 participating countries and failed to score any points.

== Background ==
Prior to the 1997 contest, Norsk rikskringkasting (NRK) had participated in the Eurovision Song Contest representing Norway 36 times since its first entry in 1960. It had won the contest on two occasions: in 1985 with the song "La det swinge" performed by Bobbysocks!, and in 1995 with the song "Nocturne" performed by Secret Garden. It also had the two distinctions of having finished last in the Eurovision final more than any other country and for having the most nul points (zero points) in the contest, the latter being a record the nation shared together with Austria. It had finished last seven times and had failed to score a point during four contests.

As part of its duties as participating broadcaster, NRK organises the selection of its entry in the Eurovision Song Contest and broadcasts the event in the country. The broadcaster has traditionally organised the national final Melodi Grand Prix to select its entry for the contest in all but one of its participation. NRK organized of Melodi Grand Prix 1997 in order to select its 1997 entry.

== Before Eurovision ==
=== Melodi Grand Prix 1997 ===
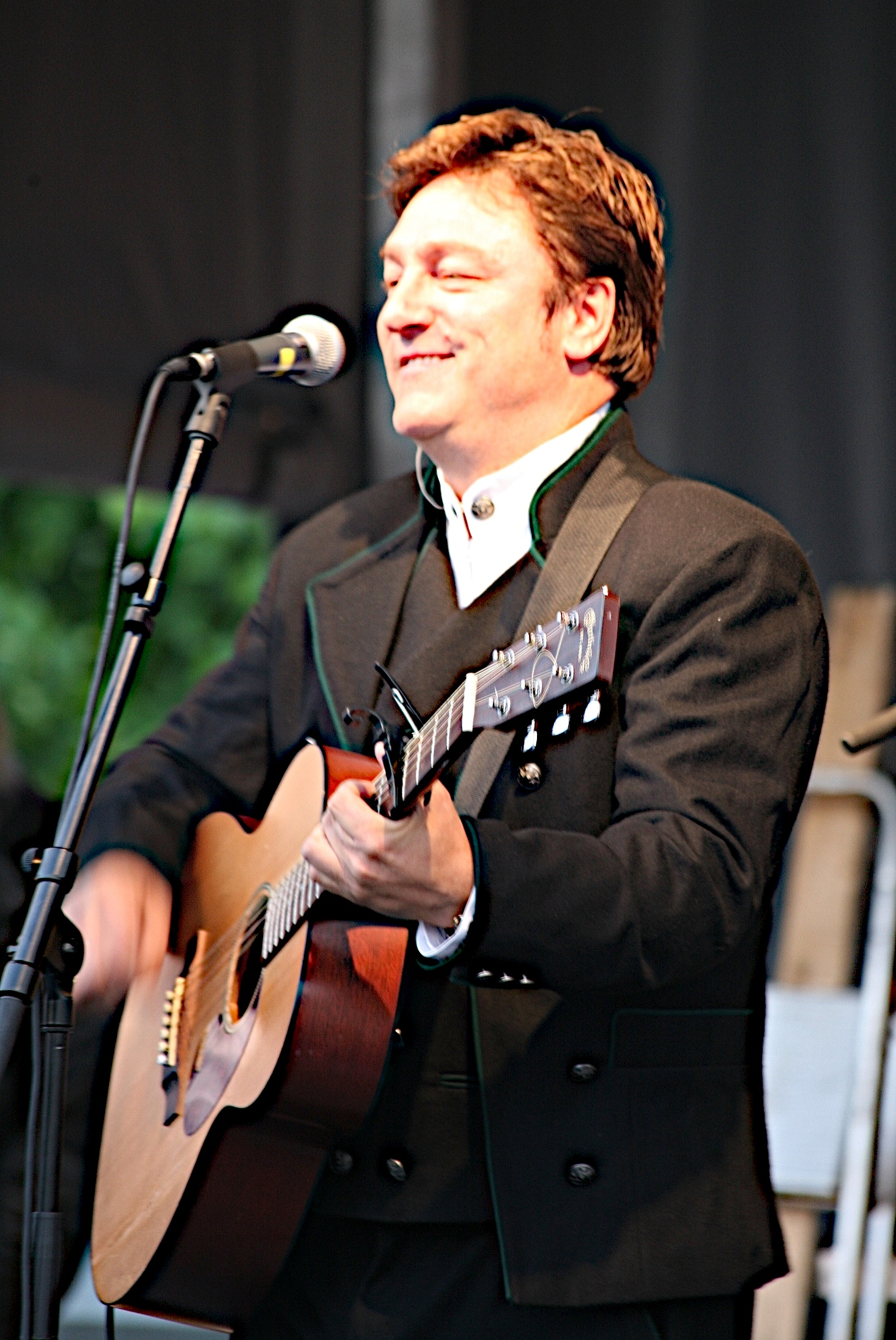
Tor Endresen won Melodi Grand Prix on his eighth attempt in the competition

Melodi Grand Prix 1997 was the 36th edition of the national final Melodi Grand Prix and was organised by NRK to select its entry for the Eurovision Song Contest 1997. Eight songs, selected for the competition by a three-member jury panel from 350 received submissions, competed during the final which was televised on NRK1 on 8 February 1997 and hosted by Tande-P. A live orchestra conducted by Geir Langslet accompanied each performance in varying capacities and the combination of votes from public televoting (60%) and an expert jury (40%) led to the victory of "San Francisco" performed by Tor Endresen. The jury consisted of H.C. Andersen (NRK P3 radio host), Elisabeth Andreassen (singer), Kari Gjærum (singer), Ole Evenrud (producer), Leif Erik Forberg (TV3 presenter) and Frode Viken (composer). The national final was watched by 1.308 million viewers in Norway.

70,000 votes were registered by the televote during the show, however Telenor later revealed that at least 400,000 additional votes were unable to be registered due to technical issues, which led to strong dissatisfaction from viewers that failed to cast their votes during the 15-minute window. There was also criticism of Tor Endresen's victory as several of the jury members were friends of Endresen; Elisabeth Andreassen told the press that "Endresen deserved to win" regardless of what song he participated with.

Final – 8 February 1997
R/O	Artist	Song	Songwriter(s)	Percentage	Place
1	Marianne E. Olsen	"Min egen superstar"	Marianne Elstad Olsen, Henning Hoel Eriksen, Fredrik Friis	11.3%	5
2	Angela Kim Lewis	"So ro lille tull"	Torstein Bieler, Chris Påhlman, Nora Skaug	14.3%	3
3	Guro Håvik	"Consensus"	Gunnar Lorentzen	10.6%	6
4	Penthouse Playboys	"Om du elsket meg"	Kjetil Rolness, Jørn Mortensen	12.6%	4
5	Geir Rønning	"Venter på deg"	Are Selheim	7.0%	7
6	Beate Olsen	"Rolig"	Beate Olsen	2.9%	8
7	Tor Endresen	"San Francisco"	Tor Endresen, Arne Myksvoll	23.9%	1
8	Manjari	"Lys"	Rune Lindstrøm	18.0%	2

== At Eurovision ==
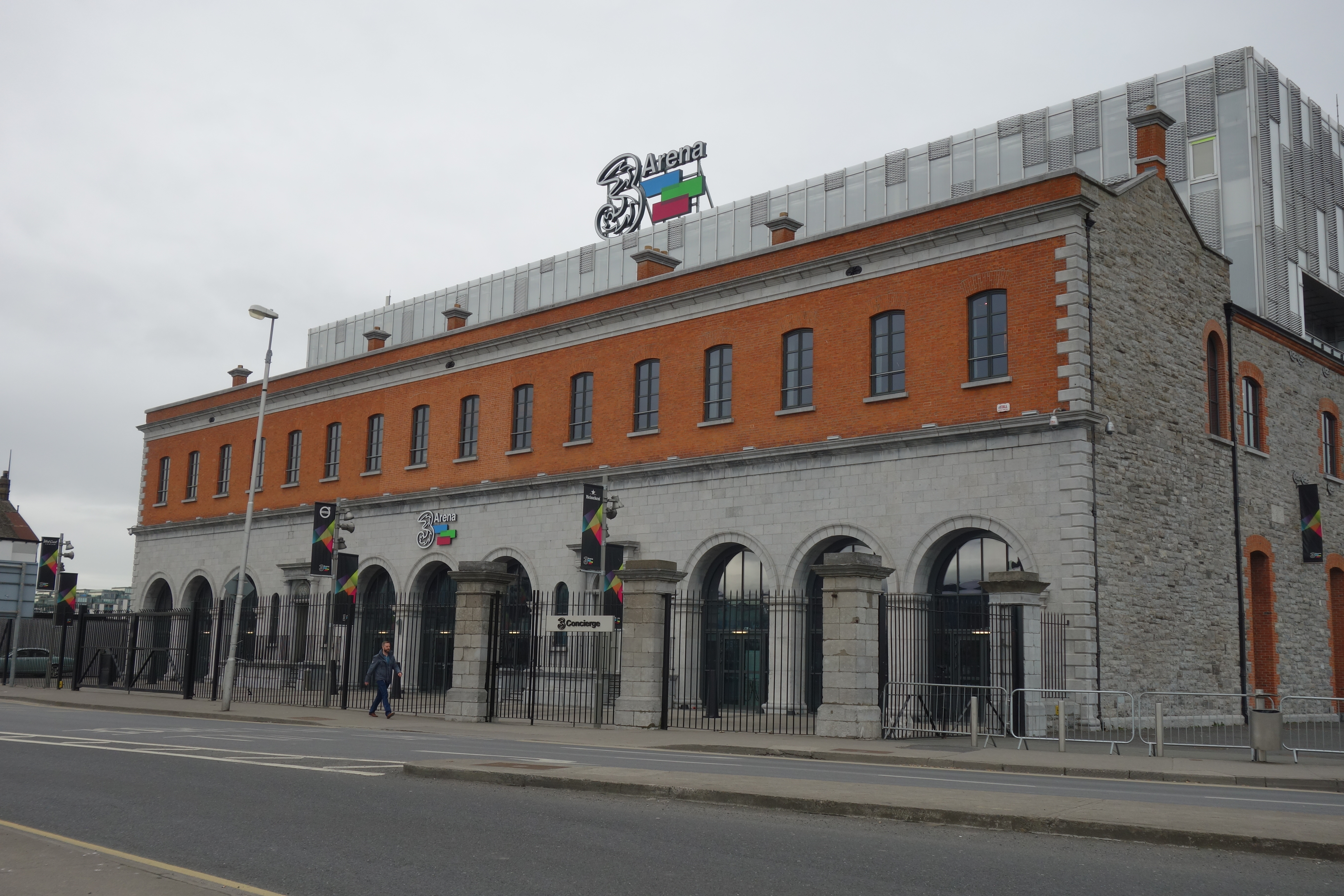
The Eurovision Song Contest 1997 took place at the Point Theatre in Dublin, Ireland, on 3 May 1997.

According to Eurovision rules, the twenty-four countries which had obtained the highest average number of points over the last four contests competed in the final on 3 May 1997. On 28 November 1996, an allocation draw was held which determined the running order and Norway was set to perform in position 3, following the entry from Turkey and before the entry from Austria. The Norwegian conductor at the contest was Geir Langslet, and Norway finished in twenty-fourth (joint-last) place failing to score any points.

In Norway, the contest was broadcast on NRK1 with commentary by Jostein Pedersen as well as broadcast via radio on NRK P1 with commentary by Kristian Lindeman. NRK appointed Ragnhild Sælthun Fjørtoft as its spokesperson to announce the Norwegian votes during the show.

=== Voting ===
Norway did not receive any points at the 1997 Eurovision Song Contest. The nation awarded its 12 points to France in the contest, with the full breakdown of points awarded by Norway displayed below.

Points awarded by Norway
Score	Country
12 points	France
10 points	Malta
8 points	Sweden
7 points	Denmark
6 points	United Kingdom
5 points	Greece
4 points	Poland
3 points	Ireland
2 points	Cyprus
1 point	Russia
