= Cyprus in the Eurovision Song Contest 1997 =

- Eurovision Song Contest 1997
- Participating broadcaster: Cyprus Broadcasting Corporation (CyBC)
- Country: Cyprus
- Selection process: National final
- Selection date: 18 February 1997

Competing entry
- Song: "Mana mou"
- Artist: Hara and Andreas Konstantinou
- Songwriter: Constantina Konstantinou

Placement
- Final result: 5th, 98 points

Participation chronology

Cyprus was represented at the Eurovision Song Contest 1997 with the song "Mana mou", written by Constantina Konstantinou, and performed by Hara and Andreas Konstantinou. The Cypriot participating broadcaster, the Cyprus Broadcasting Corporation (CyBC), selected its entry through a national final.

== Before Eurovision ==
=== Diagonismós Tragoudioú Giourovízion 1997 ===
==== Competing entries ====
The Cyprus Broadcasting Corporation (CyBC) opened a submission period for Cypriot artists and composers to submit songs until 10 January 1997. By the end of the submission period, 50 entries had been submitted. On 26 January 1997, in radio room one of the CyBC studios, a 9-member jury listened to the received submissions and chose eight songs to compete in the national final.

==== Final ====
The final was broadcast live at 21:15 (EET) on RIK 1 on 18 February 1997 in a show titled Diagonismós Tragoudioú Giourovízion 1997 (Greek: Διαγωνισμός Τραγουδιού Γιουροβίζιον 1997). The contest was held at the Monte Caputo Nightclub in Limassol, and was hosted by Marina Maleni. The running order was decided by a random draw which was done in the presence of the songwriters of the competing entries on 29 January 1997. The winner was decided by a 21-member jury who each gave out 10 points to their favourite song, 8 to their second favourite, and 6 through to 1 points for their third to eighth placing songs.

Final – 18 February 1997
R/O	Artist	Song	Songwriter(s)	Points	Place
1	Giorgos Polychroniadis	"Apopse den me noiazei" (Απόψε δεν με νοιάζει)	Spyros Kyriakidis, A. Gemenitzis	91	5
2	Dalida Mitzi	"Ta trena" (Τα τρένα)	Andreas Karanikolas	71	6
3	Charalambos Brountzos	"Mia zografia" (Μια ζωγραφιά) (Note: Titled "Kypros" in news articles following the selection of the competing entries, but later changed to "Mia zografia" closer to the final)	Adonis Aletras	106	4
4	Stelios Constantas	"I grammi tis ntropis" (Η γραμμή της ντροπής)	Aristos Moschovakis, Rodoula Papalamprianou	145	2
5	Spiros Spirakos	"Esi" (Εσύ)	Theos Kallias, Michalis Hatzimichael	70	7
6	Hara and Andreas Konstantinou	"Mana mou" (Μάνα μου)	Constantina Konstantinou	170	1
7	Giorgos Stamataris	"Xechnas" (Ξεχνάς)	Andreas Gerolemou	112	3
8	Christina Lazarou	"Pote" (Ποτέ)	Nevi Astraiou	54	8

Detailed Jury Votes
R/O	Song	Jury																					Total
R/O	Song	1	2	3	4	5	6	7	8	9	10	11	12	13	14	15	16	17	18	19	20	21	Total
1	"Apopse den me noiazei"	5	4	2	6	3	10	10	3	2	3	4	2	6	6	2	3	2	6	3	8	1	91
2	"Ta trena"	3	3	3	2	10	3	2	6	1	1	1	3	4	5	10	2	1	4	1	3	3	71
3	"Mia zografia"	4	1	8	8	5	4	5	4	5	4	8	6	3	3	4	6	5	5	8	4	6	106
4	"I grammi tis ntropis"	8	10	5	5	6	5	6	5	3	10	3	8	8	10	6	8	3	8	10	10	8	145
5	"Esi"	1	6	1	1	4	2	1	2	6	8	6	1	5	2	3	1	6	3	4	2	5	70
6	"Mana mou"	10	8	10	10	1	8	8	10	10	6	10	10	10	8	5	10	10	10	6	6	4	170
7	"Xechnas"	6	5	4	4	8	6	3	8	8	5	5	5	2	4	8	5	4	2	5	5	10	112
8	"Pote"	2	2	6	3	2	1	4	1	4	2	2	4	1	1	1	4	8	1	2	1	2	54

== At Eurovision ==
Hara and Andreas opened the contest performing first, preceding Turkey. At the end of voting, they received 98 points, placing 5th of 25 competing countries, which was at the time joint-best Cypriot placing at the contest, sharing with 1982 Cypriot entry "Mono i agapi" by Anna Vissi, and would remain so until 2018. The Cypriot jury awarded its 12 points to Greece.

=== Voting ===
Points awarded to Cyprus
Score	Country
12 points	Greece; Iceland
10 points	Netherlands; Spain
8 points	
7 points	Denmark; Malta
6 points	
5 points	Germany; United Kingdom
4 points	Croatia; France; Italy; Slovenia; Switzerland
3 points	Ireland; Portugal
2 points	Norway
1 point	Estonia; Russia

Points awarded by Cyprus
Score	Country
12 points	Greece
10 points	Spain
8 points	Ireland
7 points	United Kingdom
6 points	Italy
5 points	Malta
4 points	Croatia
3 points	France
2 points	Slovenia
1 point	Estonia
