= United Kingdom in the Eurovision Song Contest 1997 =

- Eurovision Song Contest 1997
- Participating broadcaster: British Broadcasting Corporation (BBC)
- Country: United Kingdom
- Selection process: The Great British Song Contest 1997
- Selection date: 9 March 1997

Competing entry
- Song: "Love Shine a Light"
- Artist: Katrina and the Waves
- Songwriter: Kimberley Rew

Placement
- Final result: 1st, 227 points

Participation chronology

The United Kingdom was represented at the Eurovision Song Contest 1997 with the song "Love Shine a Light", written by Kimberley Rew, and performed by Katrina and the Waves. The British participating broadcaster, the British Broadcasting Corporation (BBC), selected its entry through a national final. The entry went on to win Eurovision with 227 points. This is the last win for the United Kingdom as of 2025.

== Before Eurovision ==
=== The Great British Song Contest 1997 ===
The British Broadcasting Corporation (BBC) developed The Great British Song Contest 1997 in order to select its entry for the Eurovision Song Contest 1997. Eight acts competed in the competition which consisted of a radio semi-final on 7 February 1997 and a televised final on 9 March 1997.

==== Semi-final ====
On 7 February, a semifinal was held on BBC Radio 2 at 09:30am, presented by Ken Bruce. This featured eight songs. Radio 2 listeners voted at 10:00am and voting closed at 11:15am and the top 4 went forward to the televised final. In addition to the four listed above, the following were included, although the 4 acts not shaded in orange were eliminated:

Contestants and results of the Great British Song Contest 1997 semi-final
R/O	Artist	Song	Songwriter(s)	Result
1	Paul Varney	"Can't You See I'm Crying"	Rowan Heath, Steve Long	—N/a
2	Sam Blue	"For the Life You Don't Yet Know"	Nick Spindler, Peter Thompson	Qualified
3	Dave Black	"Heart of Stone"	Nicola Philo	—N/a
4	B-Yond	"Lighten Up"	Mike Bryan, Dave Christie, Lee Lyndsey	—N/a
5	Katrina and the Waves	"Love Shine a Light"	Kimberley Rew	Qualified
6	Laura Pallas	"Room for Change"	Cliff Cresswell, Laura Pallas	—N/a
7	Do Re Mi and Kerry	"Yodel in the Canyon of Love"	Kenny MacDonald, Gordon MacDonald	Qualified
8	Joanne May	"You Stayed Away Too Long"	Don Black, Richard Kerr	Qualified

==== Final ====
The Great British Song Contest final was held on Mother's Day, Sunday 9 March 1997 and televised on BBC 1 at 15:30pm. Gina G was special guest at the show. The final was hosted by Dale Winton. There was no simultaneous broadcast with Radio 2. The results were announced on The National Lottery Live on 15 March.

Contestants and results of the Great British Song Contest 1997 final
R/O	Artist	Song	Televote	Place
1	Sam Blue	"For The Life You Don't Yet Know"	15,657	4
2	Joanne May	"You Stayed Away Too Long"	51,584	3
3	Do Re Mi and Kerry	"Yodel in the Canyon of Love"	58,696	2
4	Katrina and the Waves	"Love Shine a Light"	69,830	1

Each of the 4 finalists were featured each week on The National Lottery Live:

Song	Date
"Love Shine a Light"	16 February 1997
"Yodel in the Canyon of Love"	23 February 1997
"You Stayed Away Too Long"	1 March 1997
"For The Life You Don't Yet Know"	8 March 1997

== At Eurovision ==
Katrina and the Waves performed 24th in the running order on the night of the contest. "Love Shine a Light" went on to win the contest with 227 points. The UK was awarded 12 points (the highest possible) a total of 10 times.

=== Voting ===
Points awarded to the United Kingdom
Score	Country
12 points	Austria; Croatia; Denmark; France; Hungary; Ireland; Netherlands; Russia; Sweden; Switzerland
10 points	Bosnia and Herzegovina; Estonia; Germany; Greece; Poland
8 points	Iceland; Italy; Slovenia
7 points	Cyprus; Portugal; Turkey
6 points	Norway
5 points	Spain
4 points	
3 points	
2 points	
1 point	Malta

Points awarded by the United Kingdom
Score	Country
12 points	Ireland
10 points	Estonia
8 points	Hungary
7 points	Sweden
6 points	Iceland
5 points	Cyprus
4 points	Turkey
3 points	Italy
2 points	Denmark
1 point	Croatia
