= Kerry McGregor =

Scottish actress and singer (1974–2012)

Background information
- Born: Kerry McGregor; 30 October 1974; Pumpherston, West Lothian, Scotland
- Died: 4 January 2012 (aged 37) Pumpherston, West Lothian, Scotland
- Instrument: Vocals
- Years active: 1996–2012

Kerry McGregor (30 October 1974 – 4 January 2012) was a Scottish singer-songwriter and actress from West Lothian. McGregor appeared on the third UK series of The X Factor, where she was mentored by Sharon Osbourne been the fourth contestant eliminated. . McGregor died on 4 January 2012 of complications from bladder cancer, a disease she had for years.

== Career ==
After studying music and drama at Jewel and Esk Valley College, Edinburgh, she co-formed, in 1993, the dance band Nexus. She then joined QFX, whose single Freedom 2 reached Number 21 in the UK charts.

She was talent spotted by Kenny MacDonald, manager of The Proclaimers, and in 1997 chosen to participate in The Great British Song Contest, the UK selection for the Eurovision Song Contest, with the song "Yodel in the Canyon of Love". The song came second, behind Katrina and the Waves' "Love Shine a Light", which went on to win the competition that year. "Yodel in the Canyon of Love" was subsequently released as a single by Polygram, credited as 'Do-Re-Mi with Kerry'.

McGregor had appeared in a number of stage and television shows including the Channel 4 comedy The Book Group playing Kenny's love-interest Carol Ann, and the BBC1 Children's drama series Grange Hill.

In 2006, McGregor was a contestant in the third UK series of TV talent show The X Factor. McGregor was mentored on the show by Sharon Osbourne. She was eliminated in the third week of the live shows on 28 October 2006, in a double elimination along with Dionne Mitchell.

McGregor appeared at sell-out summer shows in Blackpool in 2007 and performed for the National Lottery Live, before taking a break to concentrate on her song-writing. In 2008, she recorded and toured with singer-songwriter Jay Brown appearing on his album, "Take What You Need" and worked with producer and musician Calais Brown. McGregor also performed at the 2010 Edinburgh International Festival, singing in concert with classical Tenor, Martin Aelred. In 2011, McGregor was appointed Ambassador to UK charity, Action on Bladder Cancer (ABC).

== Personal life ==
McGregor was born in 1974 in Pumpherston, West Lothian, Scotland. Her grandfather was Bobby McKerracher, known as "the Scottish Bing Crosby". After her father died in a car crash when she was aged five, she was raised by her mother Margaret, who was also a singer.

Joining West Calder High School, McGregor showed promise as a gymnast until aged 13, when she fell out of a tree and broke her back. Thereafter she was a wheelchair user, but in six weeks she learned to walk again using crutches, earning a Child of Achievement Award.

McGregor lived in West Lothian near Edinburgh, with her property developer partner Dean and their son Joshua. In 2007, McGregor helped to launch the WheelieChix-Chic clothing brand at London Fashion Week.

== Death ==
After two years of complaining of stomach pains, in September 2010 McGregor was diagnosed with bladder cancer. On 4 January 2012 it was announced by McGregor's management on her Facebook page that she had died earlier that day from the disease. Four hundred people attended her funeral.

In October 2012, a recording of her cover version of "Smile" was released to mark what would have been her 38th birthday, with all proceeds going to charity.

== Discography ==
=== Singles ===
Year	Title	UK Chart Position	Album
1996	"Baby In Your Arms" (as part of the band Nexus)	—	—
1997	"Yodel in the Canyon of Love" (as Do-Re-Mi with Kerry)	—	Eurovision 1997
1997	"Freedom" (as part of the band QFX)	No. 21	Freedom
2012	"Smile"	—	—

== See also ==
- United Kingdom in the Eurovision Song Contest 1997
