= Germany in the Eurovision Song Contest 1997 =

- Eurovision Song Contest 1997
- Participating broadcaster: ARD (Note: Arbeitsgemeinschaft der öffentlich-rechtlichen Rundfunkanstalten der Bundesrepublik Deutschland) – Norddeutscher Rundfunk (NDR)
- Country: Germany
- Selection process: Der Countdown läuft
- Selection date: 27 February 1997

Competing entry
- Song: "Zeit"
- Artist: Bianca Shomburg
- Songwriters: Ralph Siegel; Bernd Meinunger

Placement
- Final result: 18th, 22 points

Participation chronology

Germany was represented at the Eurovision Song Contest 1997 with the song "Zeit", composed by Ralph Siegel, with lyrics by Bernd Meinunger, and performed by Bianca Shomburg. The German participating broadcaster on behalf of ARD, Norddeutscher Rundfunk (NDR), organised the national final Der Countdown läuft in order to select their entry for the contest. The national final took place on 27 February 1997 and featured nine competing acts with the winner being selected through public televoting. "Zeit" performed by Bianca Shomburg won after gaining 40.2% of the votes.

Germany competed in the Eurovision Song Contest which took place on 3 May 1997. Performing during the show in position 11, Germany placed eighteenth out of the 25 participating countries, scoring 22 points.

== Background ==
Prior to the 1997 contest, ARD had participated in the Eurovision Song Contest representing Germany forty times since its debut in 1956. It has won the contest on one occasion: in 1982 with the song "Ein bißchen Frieden" performed by Nicole. Germany, to this point, has been noted for having appeared in the contest more than any other country; they have competed in every contest since the first edition in 1956 except for 1996 when it was eliminated in a pre-contest elimination round.

As part of its duties as participating broadcaster, ARD organises the selection of its entry in the Eurovision Song Contest and broadcasts the event in the country. Since 1996, ARD had delegated the participation in the contest to its member Norddeutscher Rundfunk (NDR). In 1996, NDR had set up national finals with several artists to choose both the song and performer to compete at Eurovision for Germany. The broadcaster organised another multi-artist national final to select its entry for the 1998 contest.

== Before Eurovision ==
=== Der Countdown läuft ===
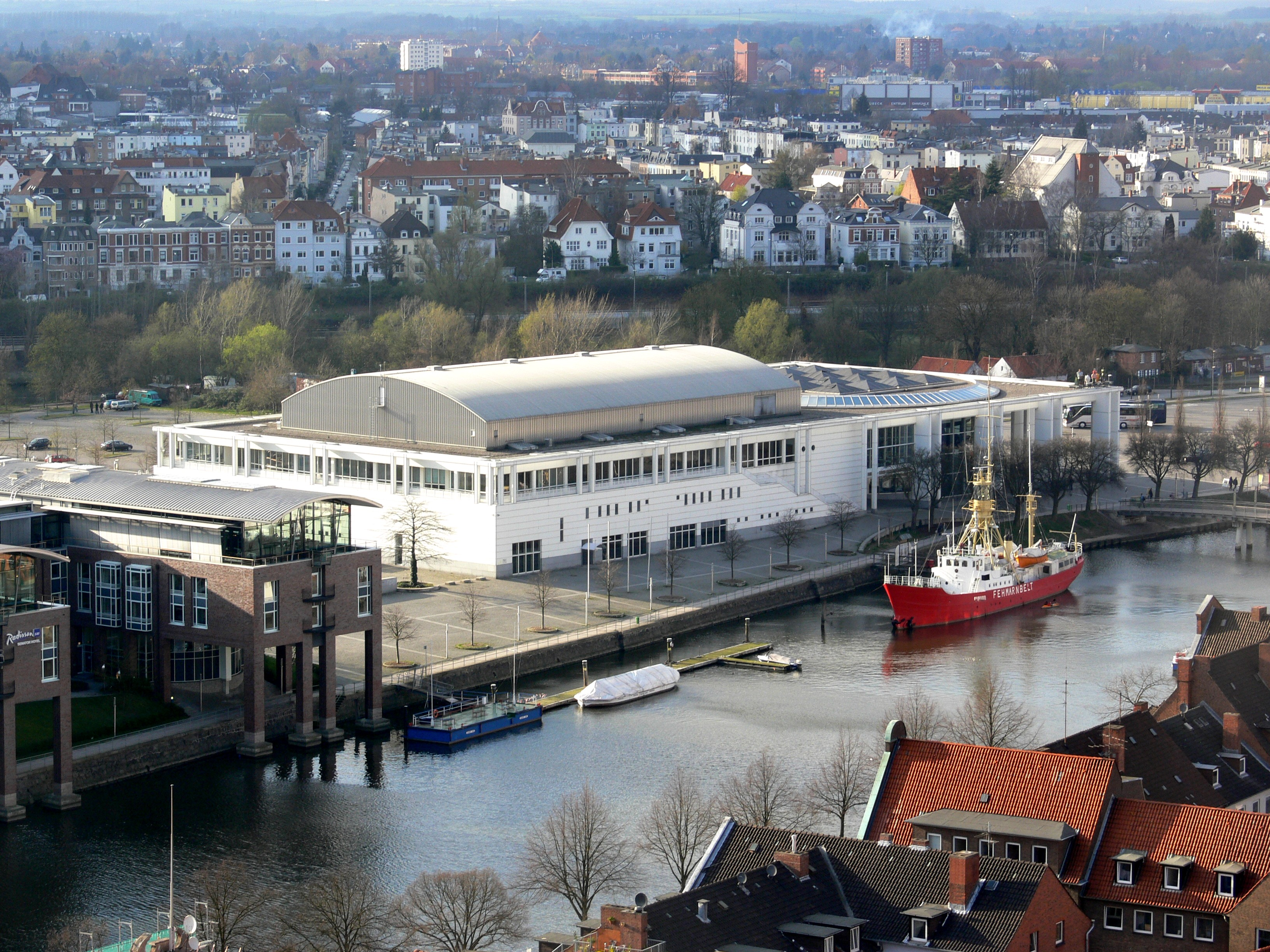
The Music and Congress Hall in Lübeck was the host venue of Der Countdown läuft

Der Countdown läuft (English: The Countdown is on) was the competition organised by NDR to select the German entry for the Eurovision Song Contest 1997. The televised final took place on 27 February 1997 at the Music and Congress Hall in Lübeck, hosted by Jens Riewa and broadcast on Das Erste. Nine entries, proposed by the five record companies with the highest sales in Germany and the songwriters of the top four entries in the 1996 national final, participated and the winner, "Zeit" performed by Bianca Shomburg, was selected solely through public televoting. Among the other competing artists was Leon who had been eliminated in the audio-only pre-qualifying round of the 1996 contest.

Final – 27 February 1997
R/O	Artist	Song	Songwriter(s)	Televote	Place
1	Verliebte Jungs	"Ich bin solo"	Christoph Siemons, Bob Arnz, Reiner Hörnig	1.8%	9
2	Michaela	"Es lebe die Liebe"	Wayne Morris, Sabine Morris	9.3%	5
3	Jeana	"Kein "bitte verzeih' mir""	Peter Hoff, Mike Bordt	5.8%	6
4	All About Angels	"Engel"	Ralph Siegel, Bernd Meinunger	4.3%	7
5	Michelle	"Im Auge des Orkans"	Jean Frankfurter, Irma Holder	11.8%	3
6	Leon	"Schein (meine kleine Taschemlampe)"	Hanne Haller, Bernd Meinunger	13.0%	2
7	Bianca Shomburg	"Zeit"	Ralph Siegel, Bernd Meinunger	40.2%	1
8	Viveca	"Komm zurück"	Martin de Vries, Roland Götz, P. Cassier	2.5%	8
9	Anke Lautenbach	"Zwischen Himmel und Erde"	Thomas Natschinski, Inge Branoner	11.4%	4

== At Eurovision ==
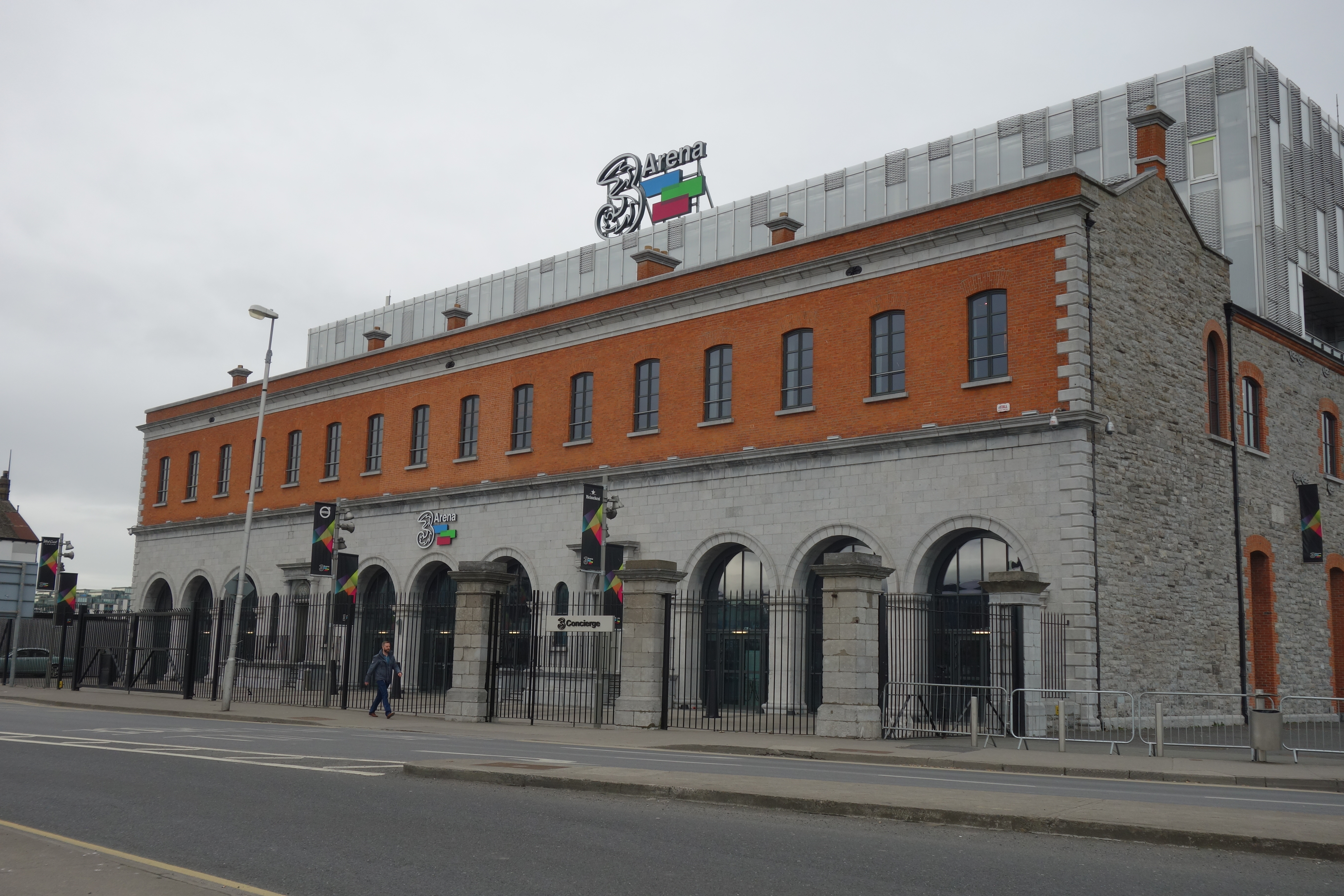
The Eurovision Song Contest 1997 took place at the Point Theatre in Dublin, Ireland, on 3 May 1997.

The Eurovision Song Contest 1997 took place at the Point Theatre in Dublin, Ireland, on 3 May 1997. According to the Eurovision rules, the 25-country participant list for the contest was composed of: the previous year's winning country and host nation, the twenty-four countries which had obtained the highest average points total over the preceding four contests. Germany was one of the twenty-four countries with the highest average points and thus was permitted to participate. On 28 November 1996, an allocation draw was held which determined the running order and Iceland was set to perform last in position 25, following the entry from Spain and before the entry from Poland. Germany finished in eighteenth place with 22 points.

The contest was broadcast on Das Erste, with commentary by Peter Urban. The show was watched by 4.79 million viewers in Germany. Germany was one of five countries chosen to trial televoting in the 1997 contest, and ARD named Christina Mänz as its spokesperson to announce the points awarded by the German public.

=== Voting ===
Below is a breakdown of points awarded to Germany and awarded by Germany in the contest. The nation awarded its 12 points to Turkey in the contest.

Points awarded to Germany
Score	Country
12 points	
10 points	
8 points	
7 points	
6 points	
5 points	Croatia; Italy; Switzerland
4 points	
3 points	Austria; Malta
2 points	
1 point	Hungary

Points awarded by Germany
Score	Country
12 points	Turkey
10 points	United Kingdom
8 points	Ireland
7 points	Estonia
6 points	Poland
5 points	Cyprus
4 points	Italy
3 points	Bosnia and Herzegovina
2 points	Spain
1 point	Croatia
