= Estonia in the Eurovision Song Contest 1997 =

- Eurovision Song Contest 1997
- Participating broadcaster: Eesti Televisioon (ETV)
- Country: Estonia
- Selection process: Eurolaul '97
- Selection date: 15 January 1997

Competing entry
- Song: "Keelatud maa"
- Artist: Maarja-Liis Ilus
- Songwriters: Harmo Kallaste; Kaari Sillamaa

Placement
- Final result: 8th, 82 points

Participation chronology

Estonia was represented at the Eurovision Song Contest 1997 with the song "Keelatud maa", composed by Harmo Kallaste, with lyrics by Kaari Sillamaa, and performed by Maarja. The Estonian participating broadcaster, Eesti Televisioon (ETV), organised the national final Eurolaul '97 in order to select its entry for the contest. Eight songs competed in the national final and "Keelatud maa" performed by Maarja was selected as the winner by a jury panel. Maarja had already represented Estonia in 1996 alongside Ivo Linna.

Estonia competed in the Eurovision Song Contest which took place on 3 May 1997. Performing during the show in position 13, Estonia placed eighth out of the 25 participating countries, scoring 82 points.

== Background ==
Prior to the 1997 contest, Eesti Televisioon (ETV) had participated in the Eurovision Song Contest representing Estonia two times since its first entry in 1994. Its best result in the contest was fifth, which was achieved in in 1996 with the song "Kaelakee hääl" performed by Maarja-Liis Ilus and Ivo Linna.

As part of its duties as participating broadcaster, ETV organises the selection of its entry in the Eurovision Song Contest and broadcasts the event in the country. Since their debut, the broadcaster has organised national finals that feature a competition among multiple artists and songs in order to select its entry for the contest. ETV has organised the Eurolaul competition since 1996 in order to select its entry, and on 5 November 1996, the broadcaster announced the organisation of Eurolaul '97 in order to select its 1997 entry.

== Before Eurovision ==
=== Eurolaul '97 ===
Eurolaul '97 was the fourth edition of the national selection Eurolaul organised by ETV to select its entry for the Eurovision Song Contest 1997. The competition consisted of an eight-song final on 15 February 1997 at the Linnahall in Tallinn, hosted by Marko Reikop and Anu Välba and broadcast on ETV.

==== Competing entries ====
On 5 November 1996, ETV opened a submission period for artists and composers to submit their entries up until 3 January 1997. 37 submissions were received by the deadline. A 12-member jury panel selected eight finalists from the submissions received by the deadline and the selected songs were announced on 7 January 1997. Among the competing artists was Maarja-Liis Ilus, who represented Estonia in 1996 alongside Ivo Linna. Pearu Paulus has competed in previous editions of Eurolaul.

| Artist | Song | Songwriter(s) |
|---|---|---|
| Code One | "Tantsupalavik" | Kaari Sillamaa, Mikk Targo |
| Hanna Pruuli | "Üksik hing" | Hanna Pruuli |
| Hanna-Liina Võsa and Pearu Paulus | "Liiga noor, et armuda" | Leelo Tungal, Ivar Must |
| Kate | "Perpetuum mobile" | Leelo Tungal, Aivar Joonas |
| Maarja-Liis Ilus | "Keelatud maa" | Kaari Sillamaa, Harmo Kallaste |
| Maarja-Liis Ilus, Hanna-Liina Võsa and Anne Värvimann | "Aeg" | Kaari Sillamaa, Priit Pajusaar |
| Pearu Paulus | "Meeletu soov" | Anneli Tõevere, Toomas Vanem |
| Tanya | "Homme" | Heldur Karmo, Heini Vaikmaa |

==== Final ====
The final took place on 15 February 1997. Eight songs competed during the show and a jury selected "Keelatud maa" performed by Maarja-Liis Ilus as the winner. A non-competitive public televote was also held and selected "Aeg" performed by Maarja-Liis Ilus, Hanna-Liina Võsa and Anne Värvimann as the winner. The jury panel that voted in the final consisted of Joan Maria Clavaguera (Radio Catalonia director), Maria G (MTV UK presenter), Enrico Nuti (Sony Music Italy producer), Hans Christian Anderssen (Radio P3 Norway music editor), Pia Kalischer (Radio P3 Sweden music manager), Hans Cuny (Peermusic Germany artistic director), Dušan Popovič (Radio Slovenia music director) and Gabriella Faludi (Hungarian Radio producer). Russian composer Vladimir Matetsky was also supposed to vote as a ninth juror but did not receive the tape with the songs on time to judge them.

Final – 15 February 1997
| R/O | Artist | Song | Jury Votes | | | | | | | | Total | Place |
| R/O | Artist | Song | J. M. Clavaguera | Maria G | E. Nuti | H. C. Anderssen | P. Kalischer | H. Cuny | D. Popovič | G. Faludi | Total | Place |
|---|---|---|---|---|---|---|---|---|---|---|---|---|
| 1 | Maarja-Liis Ilus | "Keelatud maa" | 10 | 10 | 10 | 10 | 8 | 8 | 8 | 8 | 72 | 1 |
| 2 | Hanna-Liina Võsa and Pearu Paulus | "Liiga noor, et armuda" | 8 | 4 | 1 | 3 | 6 | 3 | 10 | 3 | 38 | 3 |
| 3 | Tanya | "Homme" | 5 | 1 | 6 | 2 | 1 | 5 | 3 | 6 | 29 | 8 |
| 4 | Code One | "Tantsupalavik" | 6 | 3 | 8 | 6 | 3 | 4 | 6 | 2 | 38 | 3 |
| 5 | Hanna Pruuli | "Üksik hing" | 2 | 5 | 3 | 8 | 10 | 1 | 1 | 10 | 40 | 2 |
| 6 | Pearu Paulus | "Meeletu soov" | 1 | 2 | 5 | 4 | 4 | 6 | 5 | 5 | 32 | 5 |
| 7 | Maarja-Liis Ilus, Hanna-Liina Võsa and Anne Värvimann | "Aeg" | 4 | 6 | 4 | 5 | 5 | 2 | 4 | 1 | 31 | 7 |
| 8 | Kate | "Perpetuum mobile" | 3 | 8 | 2 | 1 | 2 | 10 | 2 | 4 | 32 | 5 |

== At Eurovision ==
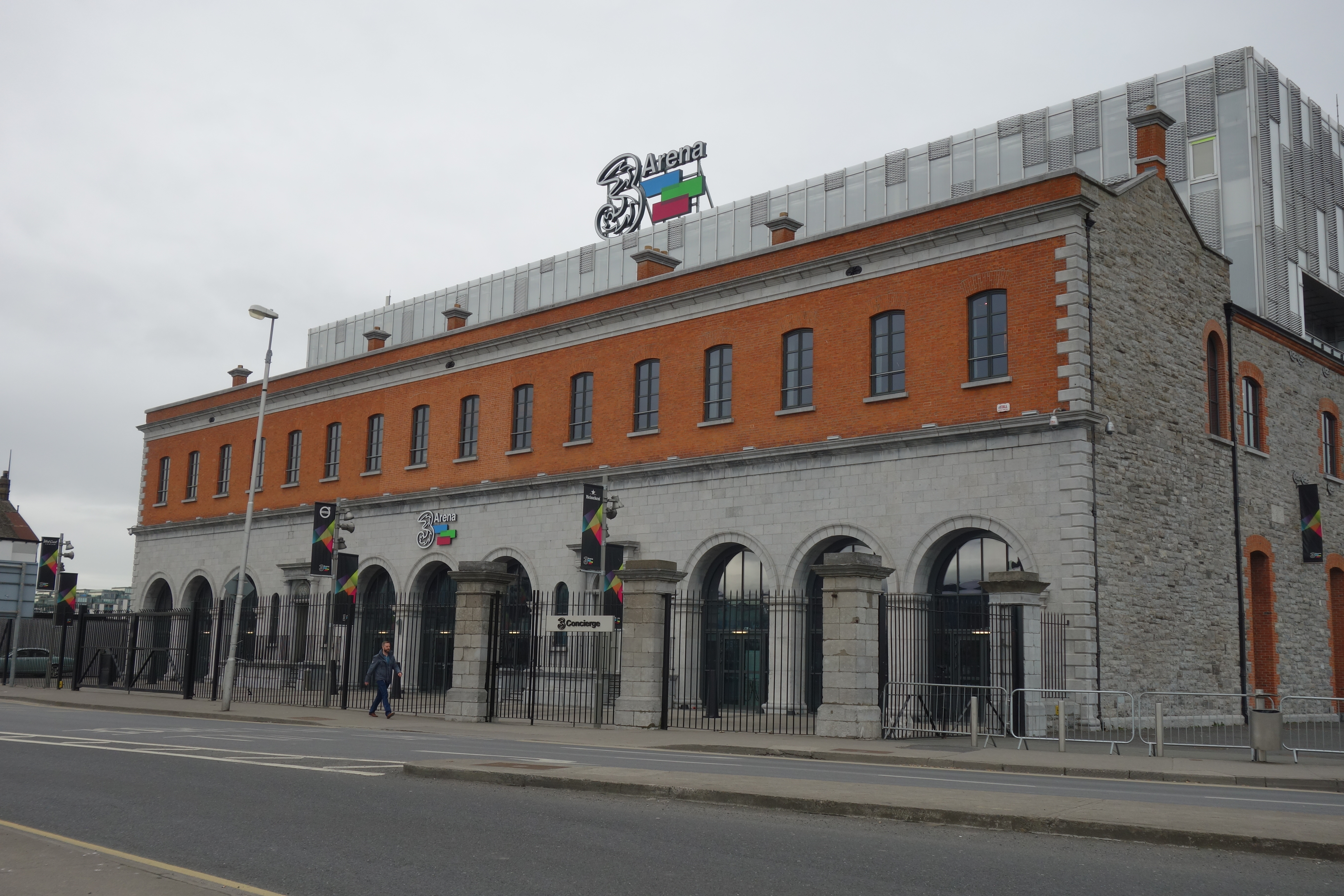
The Eurovision Song Contest 1997 took place at the Point Theatre in Dublin, Ireland, on 3 May 1997.

According to Eurovision rules, the twenty-four countries which had obtained the highest average number of points over the last four contests competed in the final on 3 May 1997. On 28 November 1996, an allocation draw was held which determined the running order and Estonia was set to perform in position 13, following the entry from Poland and before the entry from Bosnia and Herzegovina. The Estonian performance, conducted by Tarmo Leinatamm, featured Maarja on stage with backing vocalists Evelin Samuel and Airi Allvee; Samuel would go on to represent Estonia in 1999. Estonia finished in eighth place with 82 points.

The contest was broadcast in Estonia on ETV and via radio on Vikerraadio. ETV appointed Helene Tedre as its spokesperson to announce the votes awarded by the Estonian jury during the show.

=== Voting ===
Below is a breakdown of points awarded to Estonia and awarded by Estonia in the contest. The nation awarded its 12 points to France in the contest.

Points awarded to Estonia
| Score | Country |
|---|---|
| 12 points | Italy |
| 10 points | United Kingdom |
| 8 points | Denmark; France; Ireland |
| 7 points | Germany |
| 6 points | Austria; Poland |
| 5 points | |
| 4 points | Hungary; Spain |
| 3 points | Slovenia |
| 2 points | Iceland |
| 1 point | Bosnia and Herzegovina; Cyprus; Portugal; Sweden |

Points awarded by Estonia
| Score | Country |
|---|---|
| 12 points | France |
| 10 points | United Kingdom |
| 8 points | Ireland |
| 7 points | Russia |
| 6 points | Turkey |
| 5 points | Hungary |
| 4 points | Slovenia |
| 3 points | Poland |
| 2 points | Iceland |
| 1 point | Cyprus |
