= Denmark in the Eurovision Song Contest 1997 =

- Eurovision Song Contest 1997
- Participating broadcaster: Danmarks Radio (DR)
- Country: Denmark
- Selection process: Dansk Melodi Grand Prix 1997
- Selection date: 1 March 1997

Competing entry
- Song: "Stemmen i mit liv"
- Artist: Kølig Kaj
- Songwriters: Lars Pedersen; Thomas Lægaard

Placement
- Final result: 16th, 25 points

Participation chronology

Denmark was represented at the Eurovision Song Contest 1997 with the song "Stemmen i mit liv", composed by Lars Pedersen, with lyrics by Thomas Lægaard, and performed by Lægaard under the stage name Kølig Kaj. The Danish participating broadcaster, DR, organised the Dansk Melodi Grand Prix 1997 in order to select its entry for the contest.

== Before Eurovision ==
=== Dansk Melodi Grand Prix 1997 ===
Danmarks Radio (DR) held its national final titled Dansk Melodi Grand Prix 1997 at Studio 3 in its television studios in Copenhagen on 1 March 1997 at 20:00 CEST (19:00 UTC). It was broadcast on DR1. The program was produced by Jørn Fabricius, with the set being designed by Birger Christensen, and was hosted by Hans Otto Bisgaard. Ten songs, which were accompanied by a orchestra led by Jan Glæsel, competed in the contest and the winner was selected solely by a public televote, which led to the victory of "Stemmen i mit liv", performed by Thomas Lægård.

The show was watched by 1.1 million viewers in Denmark, making it the most popular show of the evening and third most popular show of the week. The national final was also broadcast in Greenland's KNR-TV on a delayed broadcast in 4 May.

Final – 1 March 1997
R/O	Artist	Song	Composer	Lyricist	Televote	Place
1	Lars Nielsen	"Du er den eneste"	Peter Michael Jensen		535	8
2	Gry Harrit	"Mon du tænker en smule på mig"	Erik Nielsen; Søren Kollerup	Per Drud Nielsen	185	10
3	Gorm Bull Sarning	"Si' mig li' Mari"	Ebbe Ravn	Ebbe Ravn; Gorm Bull Sarning	1,642	3
4	Maria Abel	"Hyldest til livet"	Michael Ronson	Maria Abel	1,275	5
5	Stay Tuned	"Hvor går man hen med kærlighed"	Jacob Launbjerg		452	9
6	Dennis Ademsen Jensen	"Livet er en ubåd"	Michael Neergård	Knud Andersen	642	7
7	Thomas Lægård	"Stemmen i mit liv"	Lars Pedersen	Thomas Lægård	5,695	1
8	Jette Torp	"Utopia"	Ivar Lind Greiner	Iben Plesner	5,331	2
9	Hans Olsen	"Et skyggespil"	Hans Olsen	Hans Olsen; Cathrine Borg	916	6
10	Lei Moe	"Vejen til paradis"	Tom Østrup	Kirsten Østrup	1,432	4

== At Eurovision ==
On the night of the final Kølig Kaj performed 21st in the running order, following Russia and preceding France. At the close of voting "Stemmen i mit liv " had received 25 points, placing Denmark 16th of the 25 entries. The Danish jury awarded its 12 points to contest winners the United Kingdom.

The contest was broadcast on DR1 (with commentary by Hans Otto Bisgaard) and on radio station DR P3 (with commentary by Katrine Nyland Sørensen and Morten H. Pankoke). The contest was watched by a total of 1 million viewers in Denmark.

=== Voting ===
Points awarded to Denmark
Score	Country
12 points	
10 points	
8 points	
7 points	Norway; Sweden
6 points	Iceland
5 points	
4 points	
3 points	
2 points	Greece; United Kingdom
1 point	Switzerland

Points awarded by Denmark
Score	Country
12 points	United Kingdom
10 points	Ireland
8 points	Estonia
7 points	Cyprus
6 points	Sweden
5 points	Poland
4 points	Italy
3 points	Malta
2 points	Spain
1 point	France
