= Greece in the Eurovision Song Contest 1997 =

- Eurovision Song Contest 1997
- Participating broadcaster: Hellenic Broadcasting Corporation (ERT)
- Country: Greece
- Selection process: Internal selection

Competing entry
- Song: "Horepse"
- Artist: Marianna Zorba
- Songwriter: Manolis Manousselis

Placement
- Final result: 12th, 39 points

Participation chronology

Greece was represented at the Eurovision Song Contest 1997 with the song "Horepse" (Χόρεψε), written by Manolis Manousselis, and performed by Marianna Zorba. The Greek participating broadcaster, the Hellenic Broadcasting Corporation (ERT), internally selected its entry for the contest.

== Before Eurovision ==
On 2 December 1996, the Hellenic Broadcasting Corporation (ERT) announced a submission period for interested artists and composers to submit their entries, in order to select its entry for the Eurovision Song Contest 1997. An eight-member artistic committee consisting of Dafne Bokota, Dafne Tzaferi, Yiorgos Papadakis, Lefteris Konkalidis, Aleksis Kostalas, Akis Evenis, and Sasa Maneta reviewed 203 received submissions and selected the Greek entry. In February 1997, ERT announced that they had internally selected the song "An den agapisis de th’ agapithis", written by Dimosthenis Strigli as its entry for Eurovision. After selecting the song, ERT began searching for an artist who would perform the selected song, but Dimosthenis stated that he himself would perform the selected song, however ERT still decided to search another artist who will perform the song and ultimately contacted other performers, such as Despina Vandi, Dionyssis Schinas, Fiona and Maria Polykandrioti, before ultimately deciding to replace the selected song. Ultimately, ERT selected "Horepse" performed by Marianna Zorba as its entry for the contest.

== At Eurovision ==
Marianna Zorba performed 17th on the night of the contest, following Sweden and preceding Malta. At the close of voting, she had received 39 points, placing joint 12th in a field of 25.

The Greek jury awarded its 12 points to Cyprus. The members of the Greek jury included Fotini Dourou, Andreas Hatziapostolou, Litsa Sakellariou, Petri Salpea, Giorgos Vrouvas, Thomas Bakalakos, Evangelos Alexandropoulos, Grigoris Lambrianidis, Loukas Anapliotis, Natalia Giakoumi, Pelagia Gialitaki, Maria Grigoriou, Katerina Kalohereti, Hrisostomos Kontakiotis, Nikolaos Lenos, and Maria Sipsa.

=== Voting ===
Points awarded to Greece
Score	Country
12 points	Cyprus
10 points	
8 points	
7 points	Croatia; Spain
6 points	Malta
5 points	Norway
4 points	
3 points	
2 points	Russia
1 point	

Points awarded by Greece
Score	Country
12 points	Cyprus
10 points	United Kingdom
8 points	Malta
7 points	Turkey
6 points	Spain
5 points	Italy
4 points	France
3 points	Slovenia
2 points	Denmark
1 point	Poland
