= Maja Blagdan =

Croatian pop singer

- Born: 16 May 1968 (age 58); Split, SR Croatia, SFR Yugoslavia
- Occupation: Singer
- Years active: 1986–present
- Formerly of: Stijene

Maja Blagdan (born 16 May 1968) is a Croatian pop singer. She began her singing career in a rock band, Stijene, in 1986. Later she had a solo career. Her first solo album was released in 1993.

She represented Croatia at the Eurovision Song Contest 1996 held in Oslo. Her song "Sveta ljubav" (Holy Love) finished 4th with 98 points.

== Sources ==
- https://web.archive.org/web/20140929174051/http://www.hrt.hr/dora_arhiva/dora2003/biografije/blagdan.html (in Croatian)

Achievements
Preceded by Magazin & Lidija with Nostalgija	Croatia in the Eurovision Song Contest; 1996	Succeeded by ENI with Probudi me
