= Jalisse =

Italian pop band

- Genres: Pop
- Years active: 1994–present
- Labels: Columbia, Tregatti
- Members: Alessandra Drusian; Fabio Ricci

Jalisse (Italian pronunciation: [ʒaˈlis]) is an Italian musical duo consisting of spouses Alessandra Drusian (born 18 May 1969) and Fabio Ricci (born 5 September 1965).

They won the "Big" category of the Sanremo Music Festival 1997 with the song "Fiumi di parole" and took part in the Eurovision Song Contest 1997, where they ranked 4th.

== Career ==
=== Beginnings ===
The two met for the first time in 1990 in the studio of a record company. Drusian in that period competed with numerous victories in musical competitions in Veneto and Friuli-Venezia Giulia; Ricci was the singer and keyboardist of a group called Vox Populi, with whom he had released a maxi-single entitled "I'm So Bad" and presented himself as a songwriter to the record companies.

From 1990 to 1993 Drusian, after being launched by Pippo Baudo in the TV program Grand Premio, made a series of appearances on television broadcasts. In 1992 she found herself with Ricci: the two decided to work together and two years later they formed Jalisse, taking their name from a character in the television series The Cosby Show. The poet Younis Tawfik later revealed jalisse (جليس jalīs) in Arabic means "diner who knows how to entertain in the tale of fables and music: sit and listen".

In 1995 the duo participated in Sanremo Giovani (the Sanremo Music Festival competition for emerging artists) with the song "Vivo" ("Alive"), finishing third in the second evening and acquiring the right to participate in the Sanremo Festival proper the following year, where they ranked sixth in the "New proposals" section with the song "Liberami" ("Set Me Free").

=== 1997 Sanremo Festival and Eurovision Song Contest ===
In 1997 they participated again at the Festival, once again by right, thanks to the rule, introduced two years before and present for the last time, which allowed the non-winning finalists of the "New Proposals" section of the previous edition to compete for 4 places among the "Champions". The song, "Fiumi di parole", passed the selection and ranked first in the event, getting the Jalisse two prizes: the Golden Lion as winners of the Festival and the Silver Lion as authors (Alessandra Drusian and Carmen Di Domenico for the lyrics, Fabio Ricci the music). This victory turned out to be among the most debated in the history of the Festival, for the controversial aftermath that followed. The song bore resemblance with "Listen to Your Heart" by Roxette, but no actions were taken in this regard because plagiarism was non-existent.

During the 1997 Sanremo week, the duo's debut album, Il cerchio magico del mondo ("The Magic Circle of the World"), was released. The result in terms of sales (50,000 copies) was below expectations, but due to the fact that the two had reached the Sanremo victory as unknown artists and with an unreleased album.

Two months later they took part in the Eurovision Song Contest 1997 in Dublin with the same song, reaching the fourth place; there were speculations of boycott from the national broadcaster RAI, which revamped in 2009 when Gigi Vesigna, in his book Vox Populi, stated that the defeat of Jalisse at the event had been driven by RAI: if the duo had won, the Italian public TV would have had to organize the 1998 edition, an operation deemed commercially disadvantageous given the scarce interest of the Italian audience for this event. Italy withdrew from the musical competition until 2011.

The following year, Jalisse submitted to the Sanremo Festival commission the song "Le cime del Tibet" ("The Tops of Tibet"), written and composed by Maurizio Fabrizio and Guido Morra, but it was discarded. Soon the duo was labeled as a "meteor" in Italy and belittled by the mass media which, among other things, played on the alleged plagiarism of "Fiumi di parole". In fact, thanks to the good placement at the Eurovision Song Contest, they began a series of concerts and tours abroad, including the United States of America (Boston), Canada, Russia (Moscow) and Chile (Viña del Mar International Song Festival). In the meantime, the duo's record was included in the programming of United Airlines and chosen by Fred Bronson for Billboard as one of the most interesting albums of 1997.

=== Decline and independent projects ===
In 2001–2002 Drusian debuted as an actress in the musical comedy Emozioni ("Emotions") directed by Sergio Japino. In the meantime, Ricci decided to leave the vocal parts of the songs to his wife and devoted himself to their small independent label, the Tregatti Produzioni Musicali.

In the spring of 2005, the album Siedi e ascolta ("Sit and Listen") was released in Germany, Switzerland and Austria, containing two unreleased tracks and some tracks from the previous album totally revisited, including a Spanish version of "Fiumi di parole" titled "Ríos de palabras". The record was promoted in Northern Europe and some extracts from it were included in compilations in Bulgaria, the Czech Republic, Slovakia and Poland. In Sweden, they reached third place at the Baltic Song Contest in Karlshamn. The German magazine Für Sie distributed 600,000 copies with the compilation attached.

After the 2007 announcement of San Marino's first participation in the Eurovision Song Contest the following year, Jalisse immediately said they were ready to return by representing the country, and subsequently presented a song for internal selection to San Marino RTV, which failed to be selected. The pair also took part in the selections for the Sanremo Music Festival 2007, but their song "Linguaggio universale" ("Universal Language"), inspired by an essay by the Nobel Prize winner Rita Levi-Montalcini, was rejected. In September 2007, they released the album Linguaggio universale attached to the book Istruzione, chiave dello sviluppo by the Rita Levi-Montalcini Foundation, published by Baldini & Castoldi.

In November 2009, the duo collaborated with the Greek site Oikotimes.com, analyzing the entries of the Junior Eurovision Song Contest of that year. They played the role of themselves in Fausto Brizzi's film Many Kisses Later, performing their signature song "Fiumi di parole". In 2012 they released the single "Tra rose e cielo" ("Between the Roses and the Sky"), written together with the Italian-Iraqi poet Younis Tawfik, who had escaped from the regime of Saddam Hussein. Two other singles were released later: "E se torna la voce" ("And If Voice Returns") in March 2013 and "Dove sei" ("Where You Are") in June 2013. On 26 March 2014, Drusian presented herself to The Voice of Italy but failed to be blind-chosen by any of the coaches.

In December 2016, The Best of Jalisse was released, with all of the duo's singles, and promoted it throughout 2017.

In 2018, they were among the competitors of the TV program Ora o mai più, broadcast on Rai 1 and presented by Amadeus, where they won the third episode (out of its four) and came second overall. In the autumn of 2018, Alessandra Drusian took part in the eighth edition of Tale e quale show and the seventh edition, its tournament edition, ranking second in both.

On 3 May 2019, the single "Cavallo bianco" ("White Horse") was released, a cover of the 1976 Matia Bazar song, with the collaboration of Carlo Marrale. Their new album, Voglio emozionarmi ancora, was released on 17 March 2020.

In February 2024, they were selected to compete in the final of Una voce per San Marino 2024, the Sammarinese national selection for the Eurovision Song Contest 2024.

== Discography ==
=== Studio albums ===
- Il cerchio magico del mondo (1997)
- I'll Fly (2000)
- Siedi e ascolta (2006)
- Linguaggio universale (2009)
- Voglio emozionarmi ancora (2020)

=== Compilations ===
- The Best of (2016)

=== Singles ===
- "Vivo" (1995)
- "Liberami" (1996)
- "Fiumi di parole" (1997)
- "6 desiderio" (2004)
- "Non voglio lavorare" (2009)
- "Tra rose e cielo" (2012)
- "E se torna la voce" (2013)
- "Dove sei" (2013)
- "L'alchimista, per sempre tuo cavaliere" (2014)
- "Faro de estrellas" (2015)
- "Ora" (2018)
- "Cavallo bianco" (2019)
- "Non aver paura di chiamarlo amore" (2020)
- "Voglio emozionarmi ancora" (2020)
- "Speranza in un fiore" (2021)

== Television ==
Title	Year	Notes
Eurovision Song CZ	2018	International jury member

Preceded by Enrico Ruggeri with "Sole d'Europa"	Italy in the Eurovision Song Contest; 1997 "Fiumi di parole"	Succeeded by Raphael Gualazzi with "Follia d'amore"
