= Marianna Zorba =

Greek singer and a music teacher (born 1967)

Marianna Zorba (Greek: Μαριάννα Ζορμπά; born 1 December 1967 in Athens) is a Greek singer and a music teacher. In 1997 she represented Greece in the 42nd Eurovision Song Contest. She was engaged to Manolis Manouselis, a composer, the week before the grand finale in Dublin. A few weeks after the contest they married. Marianna and the song, "Horepse" scored 39 points and reached 12th place. Marianna and Manolis decided to move to Crete in 2002. He works as an architect and she as a music teacher. Together they formed the duo Notios Anemos (Southern Wind) and they perform in music festivals, concerts and theatrical plays in Crete. They published a record together in 2005.

== Discography ==
- 1995 – Diavatirio Psixis (Soul Passport)-LP by Warner Music
- 1996 – Akou loipon (So, Listen to That)-LP by Warner Music
- 1997 – Horepse (Dance)-CD single, promo only
- 2005 – San Minoiko Karavi (Like a Minoan Boat)-LP by Seistron

Preceded by Mariana Efstratiou with Emis forame to himona anixiatika	Greece in the Eurovision Song Contest; 1997	Succeeded by Thalassa with Mia krifi evaisthisia
