= Alma Čardžić =

- Born: March 10, 1968 (age 58)
- Origin: Maglaj, SR Bosnia and Herzegovina, Yugoslavia
- Genres: Pop
- Occupation: Singer

Alma Čardžić (Serbian Cyrillic: Алма Чарџић; born 10 March 1968) is a Bosnian singer. She's best known internationally for her participation in the Eurovision Song Contests in 1994 and 1997.

== Biography ==
Born in Maglaj she demonstrated a flair for music even as a child. When she was 15 years old, she was judged the best amateur at the Studentsko ljeto (Student Summer) festival. In 1992, she competed in Jugovizija 1992, with the song Ljubav će pobijediti where she achieved 10th place, and in 1993, she competed in the Bosanskohercegovačko takmičenje za pjesmu Evrovizije (Bosnia and Herzegovina Competition Song Contest) where she was placed second with the song Svi na ulice (Everybody on the street). In 1994, Alma was selected to work with Dejan Lazarević as the Bosnian entry in the "Eurovision Song Contest in Dublin". In 1996, she released her first solo album called Plavo oko (blue eyes). In 1997 she entered the "Eurovision" song competition for Bosnia and Herzegovina with Milić Vukašinović with their song "Goodbye". In 1998 Alma released her second solo album titled Duša (Soul). In 2001, she released her third album entitled Malo po malo (Little by little). At the second Bosnian Music Awards held on 22 January 2004, Alma won two prestigious awards : "Singer of the Decade" and "Single of the Year" (for Dva dana / two days).

== Eurovision Song Contest ==
Čardžić appeared in four Eurovision pre-selections, once for Yugoslavia and three times for Bosnia and Herzegovina. Her two unsuccessful attempts in 1992 and 1993 came in open competition against other singers and groups, but in 1994 (with Dejan Lazarević) and 1997 she performed all the competing songs:

Yugoslavia

- 1992: "Ljubav ce pobijediti" – 10th

Bosnia and Herzegovina

- 1993: "Svi na ulice" – (rumoured to have finished 2nd, although no official result has ever been released)
- 1994: "Ostani kraj mene" – 1st (with Dejan Lazarević)
- 1997: "Goodbye " – 1st

In 1994, the ballad "Ostani kraj mene" ("Stay With Me") went forward to represent Bosnia and Herzegovina in the Eurovision Song Contest 1994, held on 30 April in Dublin. The performance is remembered primarily for the tumultuous and sustained cheering and applause given by the audience when the pair walked on stage, in acknowledgement of the prevailing situation in Bosnia, which had the unintended effect of causing Dejan to stumble on the opening lines of the song as he was unable to hear the music properly. In a field of 25, "Ostani kraj mene" finished in 15th place with 39 points.

Čardžić returned to Dublin to represent Bosnia and Herzegovina in the Eurovision Song Contest 1997 on 3 May, where the uptempo "Goodbye" (sung in Bosnian despite its English title) could only manage to place 18th of 25 entries, scoring 22 points.

== Later career ==
Čardžić has released four CDs and remains a popular singer in her homeland.

== Albums Discography ==
- 1996: Plavo oko
- 1998: Duša
- 2001: Malo po malo
- 2004: Moje pjesme (Compilation)

Awards and achievements
Preceded by Fazla with "Sva bol svijeta"	Bosnia and Herzegovina in the Eurovision Song Contest; 1994 (with Dejan Lazarević)	Succeeded by Davorin Popović with "Dvadeset prvi vijek"
Preceded by Amila Glamočak with "Za našu ljubav"	Bosnia and Herzegovina in the Eurovision Song Contest; 1997	Succeeded by Dino & Beatrice with "Putnici"
