= Marc Roberts (singer) =

Irish singer (born 1968)

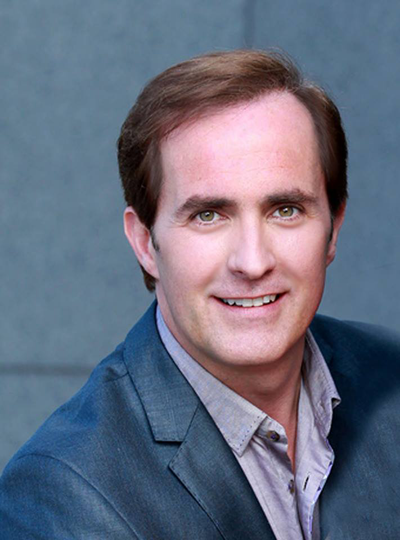

Background information
- Born: Seán Hegarty; 25 June 1968 (age 58); Crossmolina, County Mayo, Ireland
- Genre: Easy listening
- Occupations: Singer-songwriter, radio broadcaster, TV presenter
- Website: marcroberts.ie

Seán Hegarty (born 25 June 1968), better known by his stage name Marc Roberts, is an Irish singer, best known for representing Ireland in the Eurovision Song Contest in 1997. His song, "Mysterious Woman", finished in second place and reached number two on the Irish Singles Chart. He is originally from Crossmolina, County Mayo, and now based in Galway, where he presents a local radio show as well as continuing his singing career. He has to date released six studio albums.

== Career ==
Marc Roberts rose to prominence when he represented Ireland in the 1997 Eurovision Song Contest with the song "Mysterious Woman". The song finished in second place behind Katrina and the Waves' "Love Shine a Light". The single made No.2 in the Irish Singles Chart, remaining on the chart for seven weeks. Following this, he released his debut, self-titled album and second single, "Babe".

In the early 2000s, Roberts returned with his second and third albums, Meet Me Half Way (2003) and Once in My life (2005), on which Roberts wrote a number of the songs. Around this time, Roberts joined local radio station Galway Bay FM as a guest presenter. Performing a three-hour afternoon show, 12pm to 3pm each Saturday, & Sunday 12pm to 1:30pm, called The Feel Good Factor, he continues in this role as of 2018.

In 2006, Roberts emerged as a songwriter by co-writing a number of songs on singer Daniel O'Donnell's album, Until the Next Time. This included the single "Crush on You", which reached No.21 in the UK Singles Chart. The album itself reached No.10 in the UK Albums Chart.

In 2008, Roberts attempted to represent Ireland again in the Eurovision Song Contest with his own composition, "Chances". The selection process was made by public vote during a live television broadcast from University of Limerick on Saturday 23 February on RTÉ television. He lost out to "Irelande Douze Pointe" by Dustin the Turkey.

Three more albums followed over the next few years: The Promise (2010), Now and Then (2013) and A Tribute to the Music of John Denver (2015). The last of these saw Roberts embarking on a series of live shows, performing hits of John Denver for the past few years, including a show at Denver's hometown, Colorado.

On 5 July 2024, Marc released his 7th studio album Lilac Road.

== Early life ==
Roberts attended Gortnor Abbey.

== Discography ==
=== Albums ===
List of albums, with selected details
Title	Details
Marc Roberts	Released: 1998; Label: The Grapevine Label (GRACD235); Format: CD, CS
Meet Me Half Way	Released: 2003; Label: CID Records (CIDCD001); Format: CD
Once In Your Life	Released: 2005; Label: CID Records (CIDR0524); Format: CD
The Promise	Released: 2009; Label: CID Records (CIDCD004); Format: CD
Now & Then	Released: 2013; Label: CID Records (CIDCD005); Format: CD, digital
A Tribute to the Music of John Denver	Released: 2015; Label: CID Records (CIDCD006); Format: CD, digital
Lilac Road	Released: July 2024; Label: CID Records; Format: CD, digital

=== Charted singles ===
Year	Title	Chart positions	Album
Year	Title	IRE	Album
1997	"Mysterious Woman"	2	Marc Roberts

Awards and achievements
Preceded by Eimear Quinn with "The Voice"	Ireland in the Eurovision Song Contest; 1997	Succeeded by Dawn Martin with "Is Always Over Now?"
