= Spain in the Eurovision Song Contest 1997 =

- Eurovision Song Contest 1997
- Participating broadcaster: Televisión Española (TVE)
- Country: Spain
- Selection process: Internal selection
- Announcement date: Artist: 5 April 1997; Song: 11 April 1997

Competing entry
- Song: "Sin rencor"
- Artist: Marcos Llunas
- Songwriter: Marcos Llunas

Placement
- Final result: 6th, 96 points

Participation chronology

Spain was represented at the Eurovision Song Contest 1997 with the song "Sin rencor", written and performed by Marcos Llunas. The Spanish participating broadcaster, Televisión Española (TVE), internally selected its entry for the contest. The song, performed in position 10, placed sixth out of twenty-five competing entries with 96 points.

== Before Eurovision ==
Televisión Española (TVE) internally selected "Sin rencor", written and performed by Marcos Llunas, as its entry for the Eurovision Song Contest 1997. Llunas had won the OTI Festival 1995 for Spain with the song "Eres mi debilidad", making him the only OTI Festival winner to ever participate in Eurovision. The broadcaster announced the name of the song, and the songwriter/performer on 5 April 1997. The song was presented in the TVE show Gracias por todo on 11 April.

== At Eurovision ==
On 3 May 1997, the Eurovision Song Contest was held at the Point Theatre in Dublin hosted by Radio Telefís Éireann (RTÉ), and broadcast live throughout the continent. Llunas performed "Sin rencor" tenth in the evening, following Italy and preceding Germany. He was accompanied on stage by Mosa García and Eva Gris as backing singers, and by Jordi Bonell, Jordi Portaz, and David Simó as backing musicians. Toni Xuclà conducted the event's orchestra performance of the Spanish entry. At the close of the voting "Sin rencor" received 96 points, coming 6th.

TVE broadcast the contest in Spain on La Primera, and abroad on TVE Internacional, with commentary by José Luis Uribarri. Before the event, TVE aired a talk show hosted by José Manuel Parada introducing the Spanish jury, which continued after the contest commenting on the results.

=== Voting ===
TVE assembled a jury panel with sixteen members. The following members comprised the Spanish jury:

- Mary Carrillo – actress
- Miryam Fultz – singer
- Javier López de Guereña – composer
- Fernando Arias – riding instructor
- Eva Santamaría – singer, represented Spain in 1993
- Beatriz Rojo – student
- Pepe Rubio – designer
- Antonio Carbonell – singer, represented Spain in 1996
- Ana Ojeda – physician
- Yolanda Flores – journalist
- Josele – comedian
- Manuel del Rosario – student
- Pilar Darder – housewife
- María Esteve – actress
- Manolo H.H. – journalist
- Fernando González – pilot

The jury was chaired by Enric Frigola, with Javier González as secretary, and Belén Fernández de Henestrosa as spokesperson. José Manuel de la Cruz Lagunero was the notary public. These did not have the right to vote, but the president decided in the event of a tie. The jury awarded its maximum of 12 points to Turkey.

Points awarded to Spain
Score	Country
12 points	Malta
10 points	Cyprus; Hungary
8 points	Portugal; Russia; Switzerland
7 points	
6 points	Greece; Ireland; Netherlands
5 points	Slovenia
4 points	Poland; Turkey
3 points	Italy
2 points	Denmark; France; Germany
1 point	

Points awarded by Spain
Score	Country
12 points	Turkey
10 points	Cyprus
8 points	Italy
7 points	Greece
6 points	Ireland
5 points	United Kingdom
4 points	Estonia
3 points	Switzerland
2 points	Poland
1 point	Malta
