= Turkey in the Eurovision Song Contest 1997 =

- Eurovision Song Contest 1997
- Participating broadcaster: Turkish Radio and Television Corporation (TRT)
- Country: Turkey
- Selection process: 20. Eurovision Şarkı Yarışması Türkiye Finali
- Selection date: 1 March 1997

Competing entry
- Song: "Dinle"
- Artist: Şebnem Paker and Grup Ethnic
- Songwriters: Levent Çoker; Mehtap Alnıtemiz

Placement
- Final result: 3rd, 121 points

Participation chronology

Turkey was represented at the Eurovision Song Contest 1997 with the song "Dinle", composed by Levent Çoker, with lyrics by Mehtap Alnıtemiz, and performed by Şebnem Paker. The Turkish participating broadcaster, the Turkish Radio and Television Corporation (TRT), selected its entry through a national final. Both Şebnem Paker and Levent Çoker had represented Turkey in 1996.

== Before Eurovision ==
=== 20. Eurovision Şarkı Yarışması Türkiye Finali ===
The Turkish Radio and Television Corporation (TRT) held the national final on 1 March 1997 at its television studios in Ankara, hosted by Bülend Özveren and Meltem Ersan. Ten songs competed, and the winner was determined by an expert jury. Songs #1, 3, 4, 5 and 8 were performed by the use of backing tracks; however, they were still backed by the orchestra with their respective conductors. Songs #6, 9 and 10 were played live, while songs #2 and 7 used full playback. Ümit Eroğlu was the chief conductor in this preselection. His orchestra consisted of 49 musicians.

Final – 1 March 1997
R/O	Artist	Song	Lyricist	Composer	Conductor	Points	Place
1	Burcu Güneş	"Gece"	Günay Çoban	Müfit Bayraşa	Ümit Eroğlu	0	4
2	Serdar Aydemir	"Aşkıma İnan"	Hakan Süersan	Hakan Süersan	n/a	0	4
3	Şebnem Özsaran	"Dördüncü Boyut"	Semih Güneri	Semih Güneri	Semih Güneri	1	3
4	Şebnem Paker & Grup Ethnic	"Dinle"	Mehtap Alnıtemiz	Levent Çoker	Levent Çoker	10	1
5	Sevan Deniz	"Hiç Gitme"	Sevan Deniz	Sevan Deniz	Güneş Apaydın	0	4
6	Tüzmen & Elçin Engin	"Şarkı"	Hale Turan	Şansal Engin	Ümit Eroğlu	0	4
7	Tuba Önal	"Sevda Bu Dostun"	Selma Çuhacı	Müfit Bayraşa	n/a	0	4
8	Erdal Çelik	"Seninle"	Erdal Çelik	Erdal Çelik	Mete Aydın Çelik	0	4
9	Pınar Ayhan & Grup S.O.S.	"Sen Nerede Ben Orada"	Selma Çuhacı	Erdinç Tunç	Ümit Eroğlu	3	2
10	Ece Sandallı	"Sevda"	Çetin Akcan	Ece Sandallı	Serdar Kalafatoğlu	0	4

== At Eurovision ==
On the night of the contest Şebnem performed 2nd in the running order, following Cyprus and preceding Norway. At the close of the voting, Dinle had received 121 points placing Turkey 3rd. This was the best result Turkey had ever reached at the contest up to that time, and will remain so until their victory in 2003. 18 participants voted for Dinle. The Turkish jury awarded its 12 points to Malta.

=== Voting ===
Points awarded to Turkey
Score	Country
12 points	Bosnia and Herzegovina; Germany; Spain
10 points	Malta
8 points	
7 points	Austria; Greece; Iceland; Italy
6 points	Estonia; France; Hungary; Sweden; Switzerland
5 points	Portugal
4 points	Russia; United Kingdom
3 points	
2 points	Ireland; Netherlands
1 point	

Points awarded by Turkey
Score	Country
12 points	Malta
10 points	Slovenia
8 points	Bosnia and Herzegovina
7 points	United Kingdom
6 points	Ireland
5 points	Italy
4 points	Spain
3 points	Hungary
2 points	France
1 point	Netherlands
