= E.N.I. (band) =

Croatian girl group

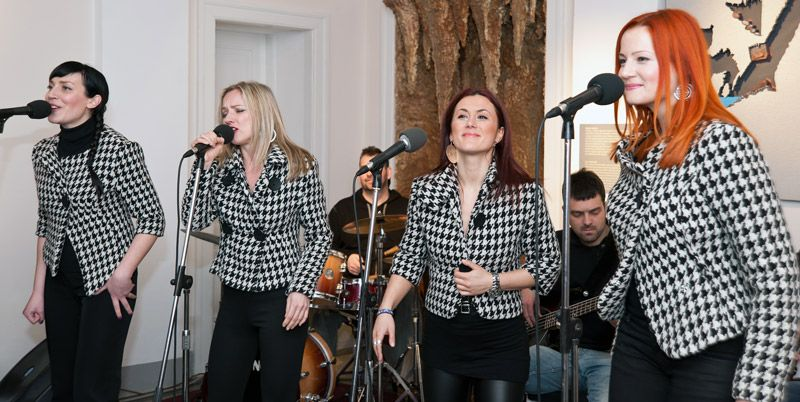
- E.N.I. in 2011; From left to right: Iva, Elena, Nikolina, and Ivona.

Background information
- Origin: Rijeka, Croatia
- Genres: Pop
- Years active: 1997—present
- Labels: Orfej, Dallas Records
- Members: Elena Tomeček Zdjelar; Iva Močibob; Ivona Maričić; Nikolina Tomljanović
- Website: www.eni.hr

E.N.I. or ENI is a Croatian pop band and girl group from Rijeka consisting of members Ivona Maričić, Iva Močibob, Elena Tomeček Zdjelar and Nikolina Tomljanović. The group debuted in early 1997 with their single "Probudi me" which was later chosen at Dora 1997 to represent Croatia at the Eurovision Song Contest 1997 in Dublin, Ireland. Their debut album Probudi me was released shortly after, in late 1998.

== History ==
=== 1996–2002: Debut, Eurovision Song Contest, Probudi me & Saten ===
All four founding members of E.N.I. were members of the Rijeka-based supergroup Putokazi. In late 1996 the group's first release was a special album where alongside them another new Rijeka-based singer was presented, Putokazi predstavljaju: E.N.I. i Vivien Galetta. A year later, in 1997, the group's first official single "Probudi me" was released. At the 1997 edition of Dora, the country's selection show to choose its Eurovision Song Contest 1997 representative, the song won the contest with 170 points; 9 points ahead of runner-up Petar Grašo. Performing in Dublin at the Eurovision Songs Contest 1997, E.N.I. came 17th with a total of 24 points. Later the same year, their debut studio album Probudi me was released. Probudi me spawned two additional singles, "Mi možemo sve" and "Ljubav je tu". E.N.I.'s second studio album Saten was released in 1998 through Orfej and spawned three singles, "Ljubav je tu", "Kap po kap" and "You're The One". In 2000, while on a break from recording solo material, the band was featured in several songs such as "Košulja plava" with Šajeta or "Profesor Jakov" with Let 3. In the campaign for 2000 parliamentary elections they, together with many other rock musicians, supported Social Democratic Party of Croatia and other opposition parties. In 2002, another collaboration titled "Treba mi vremena" was released, this time with Rijeka-based rock band En Face.

=== 2003–2007: Da Capo & Oči su ti ocean ===
In 2003, the group signed a recording deal with Dallas Records and released their third studio album Da Capo on 9 June 2003. The album included 10 cover songs of popular Yugoslav songs released in the 60's, 70's and 80's. Da Capo's lead single "Ti si moja ruža" is a translated Croatian version of Videosex's "Ti si moja roža". The album's second single "Rijetko te viđam sa djevojkama" is a cover version of Idoli's "Retko te viđam sa devojkama". The album cycle came to an end with the release od "Samo jednom se ljubi" which is originally performed by Ivo Robić. On 14 June 2004, the group appeared at the 2004 Zagreb Pride parade and festival where they performed a set of songs. In 2007, E.N.I. fourth studio album Oči su ti ocean was released through Dallas Records. The album included two of the commercially most successful songs; the lead single "Oči su ti ocean" and "Traži se dečko". Oči su ti ocean spawned two addition singles, "Mona Lisa" and "Ja znam". At the 2007 edition of the Porin Awards the group won the award for Best Group Vocal Performance for the song "Oči su ti ocean", while additionally being nominated in the category Best Pop Album for Oči su ti ocean.

== Members ==
- Ivona Maričić – vocalist
- Iva Močibob – vocalist
- Elena Tomeček Zdjelar – vocalist
- Nikolina Tomljanović – vocalist

== Discography ==
=== Studio albums ===
Title	Details
Probudi me	Released: 1997; Label: HRT Orfej; Formats: CD, digital download, streaming
Saten	Released: 1998; Label: HRT Orfej; Formats: Cassette, CD, digital download, streaming
Da Capo	Released: 2003; Label: Dallas Records; Formats: Cassette, CD, digital download, streaming
Oči su ti ocean	Released: 2007; Label: Dallas Records; Formats: CD, digital download, streaming
Crna kutija	Released: 2011; Label: Dallas Records; Formats: CD, digital download, streaming
Ouija	Released: 2012; Label: Dallas Records; Formats: CD, digital download, streaming

=== Compilation albums ===
Title	Details
Best of E.N.I.	Released: 2008; Label: Dallas Records; Formats: CD, digital download, streaming

=== Singles ===
Title	Year	Peak chart positions	Album
Title	Year	CRO	Album
"Probudi me"	1997	(Note: HR Top 40 was launched on 24 January 2013.)	Probudi me
"Mi možemo sve"	1997	(Note: HR Top 40 was launched on 24 January 2013.)	Probudi me
"Ljubav je tu"	1997	(Note: HR Top 40 was launched on 24 January 2013.)	Saten
"Kap po kap"	1998	(Note: HR Top 40 was launched on 24 January 2013.)	Saten
"You're The One"	1998	(Note: HR Top 40 was launched on 24 January 2013.)	Saten
"Zauvijek"	1999	(Note: HR Top 40 was launched on 24 January 2013.)	Split '99
"Košulja plava" (with Šajeta)	2000	(Note: HR Top 40 was launched on 24 January 2013.)	Istradamus Vulgaris
"Profesor Jakov" (with Let 3)	2000	(Note: HR Top 40 was launched on 24 January 2013.)	Jedina
"Treba mi vremena" (with En Face)	2002	(Note: HR Top 40 was launched on 24 January 2013.)	Best of En Face
"Ti si moja ruža"	2003	(Note: HR Top 40 was launched on 24 January 2013.)	Da Capo
"Mara Pogibejčić" (with Let 3)	2003	(Note: HR Top 40 was launched on 24 January 2013.)	Da Capo
"Rijetko te viđam sa djevojkama"	2003	(Note: HR Top 40 was launched on 24 January 2013.)	Da Capo
"Samo jednom se ljubi"	2003	(Note: HR Top 40 was launched on 24 January 2013.)	Da Capo
"Oči su ti ocean"	2006	(Note: HR Top 40 was launched on 24 January 2013.)	Oči su ti ocean
"Traži se dečko"	2007	1	Oči su ti ocean
"Ja znam"	2007	3	Oči su ti ocean
"Mona Lisa"	2007		Oči su ti ocean
"Polaroid"	2008		Best of E.N.I.
"Crna kutija"	2009		Crna kutija
"Jezero od mlijeka"	2009		Crna kutija
"Lijepa kao Sahara" (with Massimo Savić)	2010		Crna kutija
"Put po mom"	2011		Crna kutija
"Ostavljam ti usne"	2011		Crna kutija
"Još jedno more" (with Vava)	2012		Ouija
"Tokyo Boy" (with Vava)	2012		Ouija
"Otključana vrata" (with Vava)	2013	22	Ouija
"Ljudi"	2014	10	Non-album singles
"Prekrasan dan"	2014	4	Non-album singles
"San"	2014	15	Non-album singles
"Glas sirene"	2016	12	Non-album singles
"To je moj dan"	2017	15	Non-album singles
"Van kontrole"	2018	36	Non-album singles
"Don't Worry, Be Happy" (with Swingers)	2020	31	Non-album singles
"—" denotes a single that did not chart or was not released in that territory.

== Notes ==
Preceded by Maja Blagdan with "Sveta ljubav"	Croatia in the Eurovision Song Contest; 1997	Succeeded by Danijela with "Neka mi ne svane"
