= John Farry =

Northern Irish singer/songwriter

John Farry (born 1958, Enniskillen) is an Irish singer/songwriter from Garrison, County Fermanagh, Northern Ireland. He played in Irish Country bands Toledo, Amarillo, Tennessee Sunshine as a vocalist and guitarist before launching solo and songwriting careers.

He is best known for writing the Irish entry for the 1997 Eurovision Song Contest - a song entitled "Mysterious Woman" which achieved second place. He is one of Irelands most prolific songwriters.

He continues to write songs and to perform throughout Ireland as a singer-songwriter He has also had a very successful career in music management, managing Country and Irish star Nathan Carter from January 2010 until January 2024.
