= Sweden in the Eurovision Song Contest 1997 =

- Eurovision Song Contest 1997
- Participating broadcaster: Sveriges Television (SVT)
- Country: Sweden
- Selection process: Melodifestivalen 1997
- Selection date: 8 March 1997

Competing entry
- Song: "Bara hon älskar mig"
- Artist: Blond
- Songwriter: Stephan Berg

Placement
- Final result: 14th, 36 points

Participation chronology

Sweden was represented at the Eurovision Song Contest 1997 with the song "Bara hon älskar mig", written by Stephan Berg, and performed by Blond. The Swedish participating broadcaster, Sveriges Television (SVT), selected its entry through Melodifestivalen 1997.

== Before Eurovision ==
=== Melodifestivalen 1997 ===
Melodifestivalen 1997 was the selection for the 37th song to represent Sweden at the Eurovision Song Contest. It was the 36th time that this system of picking a song had been used. 1,229 songs were submitted to Sveriges Television (SVT) for the competition. The final was held in the SVT Studios in Gothenburg on 8 March 1997, presented by Jan Jingryd and was broadcast on SVT2 and Sveriges Radio's P3 network. The show was watched by 2,965,000 people. The winner, "Bara hon älskar mig" performed by Blond, was chosen by 11 regional juries. It was written and composed by Stephan Berg.

Final – 8 March 1997
R/O	Artist	Song	Songwriter(s)	Points	Place
1	Monia Sjöström	"Nu idag"	Lasse Sahlin, Peter Karlsson	11	11
2	Photogenique	"Nattens änglar"	Jonas Berggren	0	12
3	Robert Randqvist	"Hand i hand"	Martin Klaman, Björn Johansson, Maurizio Sorrone	55	5
4	N-Mix	"Där en ängel hälsat på"	Pernilla Emme Alexandersson, Per Andréasson	68	2
5	Jim Jidhed	"Charlie"	John Ekedahl, Jim Jidhed	12	10
6	Nick Borgen	"World Wide Web"	Nick Borgen	26	9
7	Andreas Lundstedt	"Jag saknar dig, jag saknar dig"	Alexander Bard, Ola Håkansson, Tim Norell	32	7
8	Garmarna	"En gång ska han gråta"	Py Bäckman, Mats Wester	28	8
9	B.I.G.	"Jag skall aldrig lämna dig"	Peo Thyrén, Richard Evenlind, Stefan Almqvist	40	6
10	Wille Crafoord	"Missarna"	Wille Crafoord	65	3
11	Cajsalisa Ejemyr	"Du gör mig hel igen"	Robin Carlsson, Ulf Lindström, Johan Ekhé	56	4
12	Blond	"Bara hon älskar mig"	Stephan Berg	80	1

Detailed Regional Jury Voting
R/O	Song	Luleå	Umeå	Sundsvall	Falun	Örebro	Karlstad	Gothenburg	Malmö	Växjö	Norrköping	Stockholm	Total
1	"Nu idag"				6	1			4				11
2	"Nattens änglar"												0
3	"Hand i hand"		4	10	2	2	12	2	12	4	6	1	55
4	"Där en ängel hälsat på"	8	12	1			10	1	8	12	4	12	68
5	"Charlie"				1			10	1				12
6	"World Wide Web"	1	1			6	1	6		1	2	8	26
7	"Jag saknar dig, jag saknar dig"	4			4	4	2			2	10	6	32
8	"En gång ska han gråta"		6	8							12	2	28
9	"Jag ska aldrig lämna dig"	2	2	4	8		4	8	2	10			40
10	"Missarna"	12	10	6	10	12			6	8	1		65
11	"Du gör mig hel igen"	10		2	12	8	8	4			8	4	56
12	"Bara hon älskar mig"	6	8	12		10	6	12	10	6		10	80

== At Eurovision ==
Blond performed 16th on the night of the contest and received 36 points, placing 14th.

=== Voting ===
Points awarded to Sweden
Score	Country
12 points	
10 points	
8 points	Norway
7 points	United Kingdom
6 points	Denmark; Slovenia
5 points	Ireland
4 points	Iceland
3 points	
2 points	
1 point	

Points awarded by Sweden
Score	Country
12 points	United Kingdom
10 points	Ireland
8 points	Iceland
7 points	Denmark
6 points	Turkey
5 points	Croatia
4 points	Bosnia and Herzegovina
3 points	Italy
2 points	France
1 point	Estonia
