= QFX (band) =

- Origin: Hawick, Scotland
- Genres: Electronica
- Years active: 1992–present

QFX are an electronic dance music group formed in 1992. Their music style is generally a mix of bouncy techno and happy hardcore.

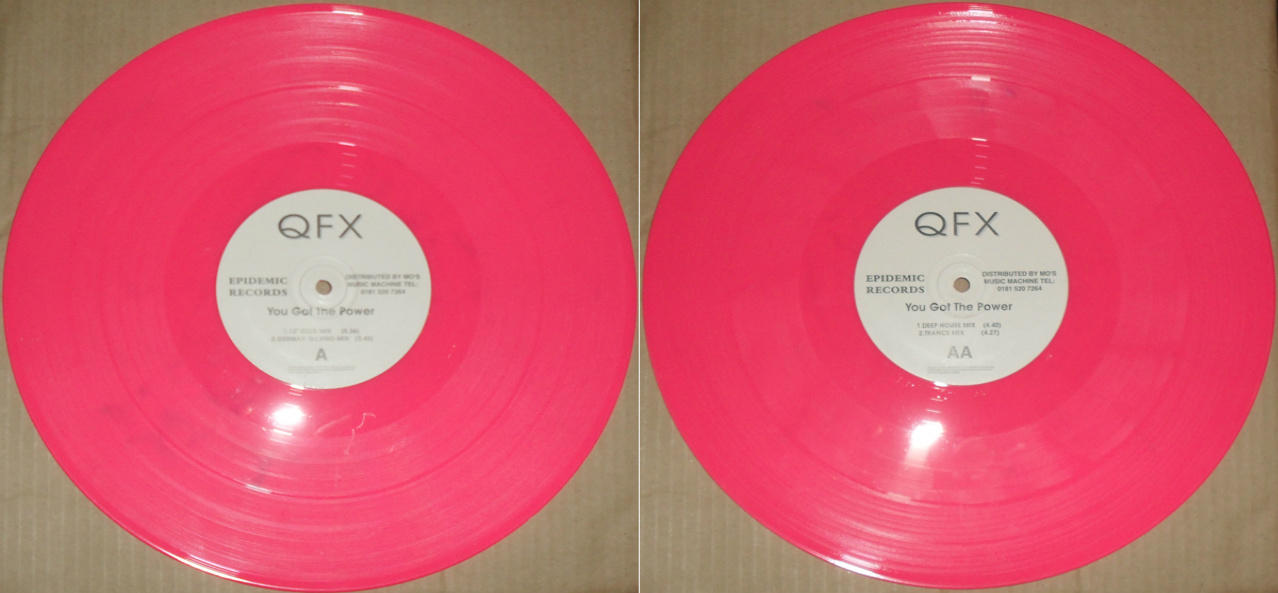
QFX's "You Got the Power" (1996) on pink vinyl.

== Career ==
The band members included are Kirk Turnbull (songwriter & producer), Heather Allan Finnie (vocals), Debbie Hudspeth Duncan (Stage Performer), Paul Giff (MC), David Goonery (Dancer), Jacob Callaghan (DJ / Producer). The band are joined on stage by Amy Davies, Lauren Black, Jackie nicoal. Previous members include, Neil Trotter MC, Steven Lawes MC, Debbie Hudspeth (vocals), Stevie Scott (dancer from 2000 to 2002), David Walker (dancer/remixer and DJ), Barry Brown (dancer), and Brian Nelly (dancer), Natalie Estelle James (vocals), and Neil Trotter (MC) In December 1994, they released their first album, entitled Freedom. It reached number 5 in the UK Indie Chart. Freedom stayed on that Top 20 list for fourteen weeks. In January 1996, QFX covered the Moby track, "Everytime You Touch Me", which propelled QFX into the UK Singles Chart at number 22 and Scottish Singles Chart at number 2. This led to an appearance on BBC Television's Top of the Pops. In July 1996, the band released "You Got The Power", which reached #33 in the same UK chart. QFX also remixed songs for other musicians, including Gala with "Freed from Desire", which reached No. 2 in the UK in 1997.

QFX released Seven albums, and had 8 UK Top 40 hit singles, including a Scottish Singles Chart #1 single with "Freedom 2" in January 1997. They were featured on over 20 compilation albums worldwide.

In early 2010, they released QFX The Anthems 1995 -2010, which included all their hits, plus their remixes and featured special guest remixes, producers, and vocalists.

In 2015, QFX are still doing a Live PA, with original members Kirk Turnbull, Heather Allan Finnie, David Goonery, with their new MC Paul Giff (joined 2018). The band are currently touring the UK, celebrating their 30th year since they formed, including headlining many music and dance festivals.

QFX launched Dance Anthems in March 2013 and have spent the last few years touring the UK with their brand new stage show. The concept of the show incorporates QFX covers of the best dance tracks in the club scene from the 1990s and early 2000s, as well as updated mixes of QFX tracks and originals. An album entitled "Dance Anthems" was released later in that year.

== Discography ==
=== Albums ===
Title	Album information	Peak chart positions
Title	Album information	UK
Freedom (Freedom: The Album)	Released: 15 April 1995; Label: Epidemic	96
Alien Child	Released: 8 March 1997; Label: Epidemic	62
Voyage	Released: 2 February 1998; Label: Epidemic	–
High on Life	Released: 14 June 1999; Label: Epidemic	–
Freedom 2002	Released: 2002; Label: Epidemic	–
The Anthems 1995-2010	Released: 22 March 2010; Label: Epidemic; Compilation album	–
Dance Anthems	Released: 29 May 2014; Label: Epidemic; Compilation remix album	–

=== Singles/EPs ===
Year	Title	Peak chart positions	
Year	Title	UK	SCO
1992	Phoebus E.P (EP)	–	–
1993	Virtual Reality (EP)	–	–
1994	Energy (EP)	91	50
1995	Freedom (EP)	41	5
1996	"Everytime You Touch Me"	22	2
1996	"You Got the Power"	33	7
1997	"Freedom 2"	21	1
1999	"Say You'll Be Mine"	34	10
2002	"Freedom" (remix)	36	14
