= Fiumi di parole =

1997 song by Jalisse

Single by Jalisse

from the album Il Cerchio Magico Del Mondo
- Language: Italian
- B-side: "Giorno di festa"
- Released: 18 February 1997
- Genre: Pop rock; operatic pop
- Label: Columbia
- Composer: Fabio Ricci
- Lyricists: Carmen Di Domenico; Alessandra Drusian

Eurovision Song Contest 1997 entry
- Country: Italy
- Artists: Alessandra Drusian; Fabio Ricci
- As: Jalisse
- Language: Italian
- Composer: Fabio Ricci
- Lyricists: Carmen Di Domenico; Alessandra Drusian
- Conductor: Lucio Fabbri

Finals performance
- Final result: 4th
- Final points: 114

Entry chronology
- ◄ "Sole d'Europa" (1993)
- "Madness of Love" (2011) ►

Official performance video
- "Fiumi di parole" on YouTube

"Fiumi di parole" (literally "Rivers of words") is a song recorded by Italian duo Jalisse – Alessandra Drusian and Fabio Ricci –, with music composed by Ricci and Italian lyrics written by Drusian and Carmen Di Domenico. The song won the Sanremo Music Festival 1997 and represented Italy in the Eurovision Song Contest 1997 held in Dublin.

== Background ==
=== Conception ===
"Fiumi di parole" was composed by Fabio Ricci with Italian lyrics by Carmen Di Domenico and Alessandra Drusian. It is a dramatic ballad, in which the lead singer tells her lover that "rivers of words" have come between them. She claims not to understand what he is saying anymore, and believes that she is losing his respect. Despite this, she tells him "I'll give you my heart, if you want / if you can, speak to it now", implying that there is still some hope for the relationship.

In addition to the Italian original version, Jalisse recorded a Spanish-language version entitled "Ríos de palabras".

=== Sanremo ===
On 18–22 February 1997, "Fiumi di parole" performed by Jalisse competed in the 47th edition of the Sanremo Music Festival, winning the "Big Artists" section competition.

=== Eurovision ===
On 3 May 1997, the Eurovision Song Contest was held at the Point Theatre in Dublin hosted by Radio Telefís Éireann (RTÉ), and broadcast live throughout the continent. Jalisse performed "Fiumi di parole" ninth on the evening, following the Netherlands' "Niemand heeft nog tijd" by Mrs. Einstein and preceding Spain's "Sin rencor" by Marcos Llunas. Lucio Fabbri conducted the event's orchestra in the Italian entry performance.

At the close of voting, the song had received 114 points, placing fourth in a field of twenty-five. Following this contest, RAI withdrew for fourteen years, and did not return until the 2011 contest. Thus, the song was succeeded as Italian representative by "Madness of Love" by Raphael Gualazzi.

== Track listing ==
CD Single (1997)
No.	Title	Length
1.	"Fiumi di parole"	3:48
2.	"Giorno di festa"	4:18

CD Single (2005 re-issue)
No.	Title	Length
1.	"Fiumi di parole" (2005 version)	3:56
2.	"Fiumi di parole" (Original version)	3:55
3.	"6 Desiderio"	3:46
4.	"6 Desidance"	3:26
