= Kowalski & Schmidt =

German-Polish television magazine

- Also known as: Kowalski & Co (1993-1995); Kowalski trifft Schmidt (1995-2011)
- Presented by: Martin Adam; Adriana Rozwadowska
- Original languages: German; Polish

Production
- Producer: Rundfunk Berlin-Brandenburg
- Running time: 30 min

Original release
- Release: 3 January 1993

Kowalski & Schmidt is a German-Polish television magazine with topics from everyday life, culture, politics, science and the social sector, is jointly presented by Adriana Rozwadowska and Martin Adam alternately in Germany and Poland.

First broadcast was on January 3, 1993, on ORB Fernsehen of Ostdeutscher Rundfunk Brandenburg (ORB) under the title Kowalski & Co, between March 1995 and the end of 2011 as Kowalski trifft Schmidt. It moved in 2001 from the ORB to the Mitteldeutscher Rundfunk (MDR), where it ran at MDR Fernsehen until the end of 2011. From 2004, the programme was also broadcast by rbb Fernsehen and renamed to today's title in 2012.

Since September 2017, the journal has been produced in cooperation with the Polish daily newspaper Gazeta Wyborcza where the current female host Adriana Rozwadowska is a business editor. It is broadcast in both countries in the respective third programme (TVP3 Wrocław/rbb Fernsehen) in a Polish and a German version. Current broadcasting slot on the German rbb Fernsehen: every 14 days on Saturdays from 5.25 pm to 5.55 pm.

== Former hosts ==
- Daniel Finger
- Ola Rosiak
- Max Ruppert
- Anna Posnanska
- Fabian Maier
- Daniel Jander
- Maura Ladosz
- Johanna Rubinroth
