= Sorbischer Rundfunk =

Joint broadcasts of the MDR and RBB in Sorbian languages

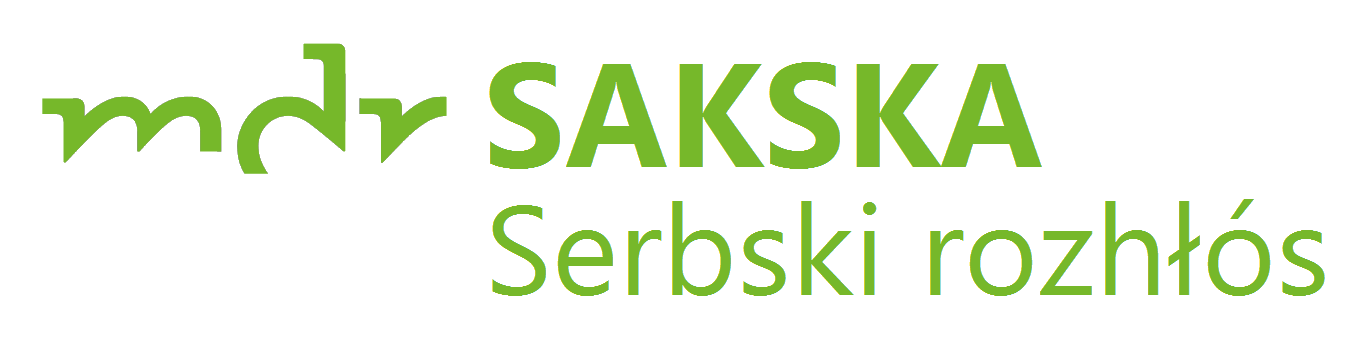
Current logo of the MDR program since 1. Mai 2017

Logo of the RBB program

The Sorbischer Rundfunk (Lower Sorbian: Serbski rozgłos [ˈsɛrpskʲi ˈrɔzɡwɔs], Upper Sorbian: Serbski rozhłós [ˈsɛʁpskʲi ˈʁɔzhwɔs]) is the Sorbian language program of Mitteldeutscher Rundfunk (MDR) and Rundfunk Berlin-Brandenburg (RBB), both of which are regional public broadcaster in Germany. It is the only broadcast in a national minority language in Germany.

== History ==
=== Origins–1955 ===
During the years 1946/47 the Czechoslovak Radio in Prague produced various Sorbian shows that were initiated by the Sorbian National Council. The Czechoslovak Radio already had some recordings of Sorbian music and poetry in its archives.

The first radio program in Sorbian language to be produced in Germany appeared on October 14, 1948, following the demands of then Domowina leader Pawoł Nedo. The program had a duration of 15 minutes and was available on a two-weekly basis on Sender Dresden (sometimes Sender Leipzig). Since 1953, irregular program in Lower Sorbian followed in Sender Potsdam. The time slots and channels kept switching for some time.

Again on the demand of the Domowina, on March 22, 1953, the public broadcasting committee of the East Germany (GDR) founded a Sorbian Studio, located in Görlitz. Although this is outside the contemporary Sorbian settlement area, it was well-equipped. The program was 70 minutes a week during the first years. The studio director, Klaus Hammo from Krauschwitz, was the only Sorbian journalist in the GDR's public broadcast. His staff had no formal training. An archive of music or other input was nonexistent and had to be created along the way.

The program of Görlitzer Studios was initially exclusively in Upper Sorbian. From 1955 on, there was sporadic input in Lower Sorbian. Since April 1, 1956, the Sorbian time slot got extended to 90 minutes a week, thereof 20 minutes were in Lower Sorbian.

=== Radio GRD and its Sorbian editorial office ===
Effective December 31, 1956, the Sorbian Studio at the public broadcasting committee was dissolved. Its members were sent to the Sorbian editorial offices of Radio GDR 1 and Sender Cottbus. Program from the Sorbian Studio Bautzen in Upper Sorbian and the one of Sender Cottbus in Lower Sorbian were broadcast via Sender Hoyerswerda/Zeißig. This came at a time of conflict between the Sorbian minority and the GDR government.

It was not until fall 1988 that religious shows became available. They were initiated by the studio director of Bautzen, Helmut Richter (Sorbian: Helmut Rychtaŕ), who got transferred there from Cottbus.

=== Since 1990 ===
Logo of the MDR program until 30. April 2017

In the aftermath of the Peaceful Revolution, the GDR's broadcasting system was revised. The newly created regional broadcaster took over the Sorbian program beginning in 1990.

On January 1, 1992, the new public broadcasters came into operation. From then on the Upper Sorbian editorial office belongs to the MDR and the Lower Sorbian one to ORB which became a part of RBB. The existence of content in Sorbian is protected by state law in both Brandenburg and Saxony.

On April 19, 1992, the ORB broadcast the Lower Sorbian edition Łužyca for the first time. The Upper Sorbian edition of MDR Wuhladko followed in 2001. Since 1996, the Sandmännchen is available in Sorbian too.

From January 6, 2020, the Sorbische Rundfunk of MDR broadcasts 27.5 hours a week (unlike the 21.5 hours it produced before), while Bramborske serbske radijo broadcasts 11,5 hours of program a week.

== Radio ==
The program of RBB is called Bramborske Serbske Radijo (English Sorbian Radio of Brandenburg) and broadcast from Cottbus in Lower Sorbian language. (It can be accessed online at www.rbb-online.de/radio/sorbisches_programm/sorbisches_programm.html for a whole day after emission.)

The Upper Sorbian program of MDR Serbski Rozhłós (English Sorbian broadcast) is produced in Bautzen (accessible on the internet via livestream only at www.mdr.de/serbski-program/rundfunk).

=== Broadcasting schedule ===
The Sorbian program is not broadcast the whole day through, but only some hours of the day. The rest of the time, some other programs in German will be available on those channels. The time slots are:

- Monday to Friday from 5 to 9 am – MDR breakfast edition
- Monday to Friday from 12 am to 1 pm – RBB program
  - Monday: Łužyca cora a źinsa (English Lusatia then and today)
  - Tuesday: Muzika – rad słyšana (English Music – a delight to hear)
  - Wednesday: Magacin k połudnju (English The current midday edition)
  - Thursday: Łužyske impresije (English Lusatian impressions)
  - Friday: Muzika a porucenja (English Music and service)
- Monday to Friday from 7 to 8 pm – RBB program
  - First Thursday of the month: ca. 12:10 pm, thirty minutes youth edition Bubak
- Monday from 8 to 10 pm – Youth edition Radio Satkula by MDR
- Saturday from 6 to 10 am – MDR morning edition
- Sunday and on public holidays from 11 am to 2:30 pm – MDR family program
- Sunday and public holidays from 12:30 to 2 pm – RBB family program

=== Radio reception ===
Channel	Site	ERP	Programme outside of Sorbian broadcasting schedule
93.4 MHz	Cottbus/Calau	30.2 kW	Inforadio
100.4 MHz	Hoyerswerda/Zeißig	30 kW	MDR Saxony (with its regional program from Bautzen)
DAB+ Kanal 9A	Hoyerswerda; Leipzig/Messegrund; Oschatz/Collmberg; Görlitz/Fichtenhöhe; Löbau/Schafberg; Dresden-Wachwitz; Neustadt (Sachsen)/Unger; Freiberg Ost; Zittau; Chemnitz-Reichenhain; Chemnitz/Geyer; Schöneck (Vogtland)	8.5 kW; 10 kW; 9.3 kW; 2 kW; 7 kW; 10 kW; 10 kW; 1 kW; 2 kW; 10 kW; 10 kW; 10 kW	MDR Saxony (Channel packagae)

== TV program ==
MDR and RBB are both broadcasting TV program in Sorbian via SES Astra satellites. Therefore, the it is accessible almost everywhere in Europe.

The first Saturday of the month, MDR is broadcasting from 11:45 am to 12:15 pm the show Wuhladko in the Saxonian program (in Thuringia and Saxony-Anhalt, a different show will be broadcast at that time). It will be repeated the following Tuesday at 5:50 am and on RBB on the second Saturday of the month from 1:30 to 2:00 pm. The RBB broadcasts its Sorbian TV show Łužyca every third Saturday of the month from 2 to 2:30 pm. It is repeated the following Tuesday during the night and in MDR (Saxonian program) the forth Saturday of the month at 12:20 pm.

== Criticism ==
A common point of criticism is that because of the importance of Sorbian language and culture in the media in the language's survival, the amount of broadcasting needs to be enlarged considerably. Apart from the breakfast edition, the Sorbian programm is broadcast when typically there is not much take-up.

Furthermore, the program offered is far from complete. The type information provided is largely local or cultural news. In order to be up to date on national or international matters, media in another language has to be consumed. Additionally, when accessing the Sorbischer Rundfunk online, German knowledge is essential, as the interface of the streaming platform is German only. This means that Sorbian speakers still have to use German even when consuming their broadcasters and have to consume other media in German.

There are complaints that the program in Upper Sorbian is of greater variety and higher quality than the Lower Sorbian one. The respective programs are both said to be short on entertainment. While there are radio shows geared to a younger audience, they are said to be lackluster and not match the needs of teenagers. The quality and design of the program is assessed by German speaking journalists making up the vast majority of the MDR/RBB employees. Therefore, it is hardly possible for the Sorbian Rundfunk to develop a uniquely Sorbian style/programs. In addition, as they MDR/RBB are providing the Sorbischer Rundfunk with certain timeslots dedicated to given programs or topics, it is hard for the Sorbian journalists to cater to the audience or introduce innovations into their shows. The children's program aired by Sorbischer Rundfunk is synchronized version of the Sandmännchen. This is taken as an example for the lack of program rooted in Sorbian culture, as it is not based on Sorbian mythology or tradition.
