= Germany in the Eurovision Song Contest 1996 =

- Eurovision Song Contest 1996
- Participating broadcaster: ARD (Note: Arbeitsgemeinschaft der öffentlich-rechtlichen Rundfunkanstalten der Bundesrepublik Deutschland) – Norddeutscher Rundfunk (NDR)
- Country: Germany
- Selection process: Ein bisschen Glück
- Selection date: 1 March 1996

Competing entry
- Song: "Planet of Blue"
- Artist: Leon
- Songwriters: Anna Rubach; Hanne Haller

Placement
- Final result: Failed to qualify (24th)

Participation chronology

Germany was represented at the qualifying round for the Eurovision Song Contest 1996 with the song "Planet of Blue", written by Hanne Haller and Anna Rubach, and performed by Leon. The German participating broadcaster on behalf of ARD, Norddeutscher Rundfunk (NDR), organised the national final Ein bisschen Glück in order to select their entry for the contest. The entry failed to make it through the pre-selection round, meaning Germany was not represented at the Eurovision Song Contest for the first and only time.

The national final took place on 1 March 1996 and featured ten competing acts with the winner being selected through public televoting. "Planet of Blue" performed by Leon was selected as the German entry for Oslo after gaining 37.9% of the votes.

On 23 March 1996, Germany was not announced among the top 22 entries of the qualifying round of the Eurovision Song Contest on 20 and 21 March 1996 and therefore did not qualify to compete in the contest which took place on 18 May 1996, making it the nation's first and only absence from the contest to date. It was later revealed that Germany placed twenty-fourth out of the 29 participating countries in the qualifying round with 24 points.

== Background ==
Prior to the 1996 Contest, ARD had participated in the Eurovision Song Contest representing Germany forty times since its debut in 1956. It has won the contest on one occasion: in 1982 with the song "Ein bißchen Frieden" performed by Nicole. Germany, to this point, has been noted for having competed in the contest more than any other country; they have competed in every contest since the first edition in 1956. In 1995, the German entry "Verliebt in Dich" performed by Stone and Stone placed twenty-third (last) out of twenty-three competing songs scoring only one point.

As part of its duties as participating broadcaster, ARD organises the selection of its entry in the Eurovision Song Contest and broadcasts the event in the country. In 1996, ARD delegated the participation in the contest to its member Norddeutscher Rundfunk (NDR), replacing another regional broadcaster Mitteldeutscher Rundfunk (MDR) which had been participating between 1992 and 1995. NDR organised a multi-artist national final to select their entry for the 1996 contest.

== Before Eurovision ==
=== Ein bisschen Glück ===
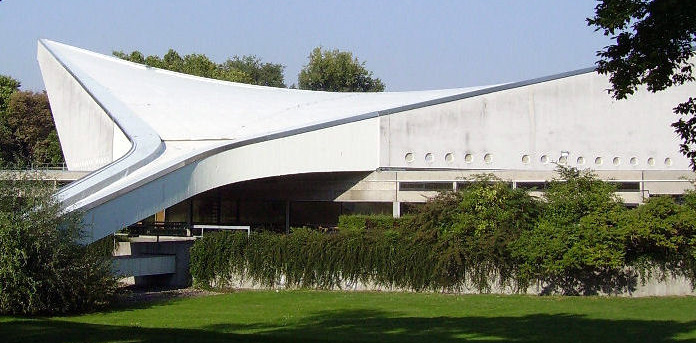
The Friedrich-Ebert-Halle in Hamburg was the host venue of Ein bisschen Glück

Ein bisschen Glück (English: A bit of Luck) was the competition that selected Germany's entry for the Eurovision Song Contest 1996. The televised final took place on 1 March 1996 at the Friedrich-Ebert-Halle in Hamburg, hosted by Jens Riewa and broadcast on Das Erste. Ten entries, selected by a panel consisting of representatives of the German Music Competitions Association and GEMA from 737 proposals received by NDR, participated and the winner, "Planet of Blue" performed by Leon, was selected solely through public televoting.

Final – 1 March 1996
R/O	Artist	Song	Songwriter(s)	Televote	Place
1	Ibo	"Der liebe Gott ist ganz begeistert"	Walter Gerke, Mick Hannes	—	5
2	Anett Kölpin	"Für dich, mein Kind"	Thomas Natschinski, Ingeburg Branoner	—	4
3	Enzo	"Wo bist du?"	Michael Reinecke	—	10
4	Rendezvouz	"Ohne dich"	Werner Petersburg	—	7
5	Nina Falk	"Immer nur du"	Klaus-Peter Schweizer	—	8
6	Leon	"Planet of Blue"	Hanne Haller, Anna Rubach	37.9%	1
7	Angela Wiedl and Dalila Cernatescu	"Echos"	Ralph Siegel, Bernd Meinunger	11.9%	3
8	André Stade	"Jeanny, wach auf!"	Jean Frankfurter, Irma Holder	16.4%	2
9	Euro-Cats	"Surfen-Multimedia"	Erich Offierowski	—	6
10	Jacques van Eijck	"Ja, das kann nur Liebe sein"	Jacques van Eijck, John Möring	—	9

== At Eurovision ==
In 1996, all nations with the exceptions of the host country were required to qualify from an audio qualifying round, held on 20 and 21 March 1996, in order to compete for the Eurovision Song Contest; the top twenty-two countries from the qualifying round progress to the contest. During the allocation draw which determined the running order of the final on 22 March 1996, Germany was not announced among the top 22 entries in the qualifying round and therefore failed to qualify to compete in the contest. It was later revealed that Germany placed twenty-fourth in the qualifying round, receiving a total of 24 points. This was the first, and so far only time Germany did not participate in the contest, having competed since the first edition in 1956, which caused some discontent between ARD and the European Broadcasting Union (EBU) because Germany was one of the biggest financial contributors to the contest due to its population size. This qualification failure, among other things, led to the formation of the "Big Five" (formerly Big Four) status in 1997.

The contest was broadcast live on MDR Fernsehen, N3, B1 and on WDR Fernsehen, and on a 3 hour and 35 minute delay on Das Erste, all with commentary by Ulf Ansorge. The show watched by 370,000 viewers, the lowest TV rating ever recorded in Germany for a Eurovision final.

=== Voting ===
Below is a breakdown of points awarded to Germany and awarded by Germany in the qualifying round of the contest. The nation awarded its 12 points to Sweden in the qualifying round.

Points awarded to Germany (qualifying round)
Score	Country
12 points	
10 points	United Kingdom
8 points	
7 points	
6 points	
5 points	Denmark; France
4 points	
3 points	Israel
2 points	
1 point	Sweden

Points awarded by Germany (qualifying round)
Score	Country
12 points	Sweden
10 points	Poland
8 points	Estonia
7 points	Switzerland
6 points	Malta
5 points	United Kingdom
4 points	Romania
3 points	Bosnia and Herzegovina
2 points	Croatia
1 point	Austria
