= 1992 in German television =

This is a list of German television related events from 1992.

== Events ==
- 30 March - Wind are selected to represent Germany at the 1992 Eurovision Song Contest with their song "Träume sind für alle da". They are selected to be the thirty-seventh German Eurovision entry during Ein Lied für Malmö held at the Stadthalle Magdeburg in Magdeburg.

== Debuts ==
=== Domestic ===
- 5 January - Unser Lehrer Doktor Specht (1992–1999) (ZDF)
- 7 January - Regina auf den Stufen (1992) (ZDF)
- 11 May - Gute Zeiten, schlechte Zeiten (1992–present) (RTL)
- 1 October - Marienhof (1992–2011) (ARD)
- 28 October - Freunde fürs Leben (1992–2001) (ZDF)
- 26 December - By Way of the Stars (1992) (ZDF)

=== International ===
- 22 February - (United Kingdom) Gophers! (1990) (RTL)
- 10 March - (Japan) Samurai Pizza Cats (1991) (RTLplus)
- 3 April - (United States) / (South Korea) Widget (1990–1991) (ProSieben)
- 4 April - (United States) TaleSpin (1990–1991) (Das Erste)
- 11 April - (United States) Captain Planet and the Planeteers (1991–1996) (RTLplus)
- 4 July - (United States) Beverly Hills 90210 (1990–2000) (RTL)
- 21 November - (Japan) Bob in a Bottle (1991) (RTLplus)
- (United States) / (United Kingdom) / (Wales) Fantastic Max (1988–1990) (Tele 5)
- (United States) Darkwing Duck (1991–1992) (Das Erste)
- (United Kingdom) The Dreamstone (1990–1995) (SWR Fernsehen)
- Unknown - (United States) Murphy Brown (1988-1998) (Unknown)

=== Armed Forces Network ===
- (United States) Darkwing Duck (1991–1992)
- (United States) Wish Kid (1991)
- (United States) Lamb Chop's Play-Along (1992–1995)

=== BFBS ===
- 14 January - (United Kingdom) The Chestnut Soldier (1991)
- 16 January - (Australia) Johnson and Friends (1990–1997)
- 31 January - (United Kingdom) Goodbye Cruel World (1992)
- 4 February - (United Kingdom) Truckers (1992)
- 6 February - (United Kingdom) Brum (1991-1994, 2001–2002)
- 11 February - (United Kingdom) Archer's Goon (1992)
- 21 February - (United Kingdom) The Cloning of Joanna May (1992)
- 22 February - (United Kingdom) Hangar 17 (1992–1994)
- 24 February - (Wales) Joshua Jones (1992)
- 25 February - (Australia) / (United Kingdom) Heroes II: The Return (1991)
- 30 April - (United Kingdom) Just So Stories (1992)
- 5 May - (United Kingdom) Spider! (1991)
- 6 July - (United Kingdom) Wail of the Banshee (1992)
- 8 July - (United Kingdom) The Torch (1992)
- 9 July - (United States) Gravedale High (1990)
- 19 August - (United Kingdom) Me, You and Him (1992)
- 20 August - (Australia) / (United Kingdom) Frankie's House (1992)
- 3 September - (United Kingdom) Wilderness Edge (1992)
- 29 September - (Australia) The Worst Day of My Life (1991)
- 13 October - (United Kingdom) Noddy's Toyland Adventures (1992–1999)
- 14 October - (United Kingdom) Follow Your Nose (1992)
- 16 November - (United Kingdom) / (Wales) Funnybones (1992)
- 16 November - (United Kingdom) Puppydog Tales (1992)

== Television shows ==
=== 1950s ===
- Tagesschau (1952–present)

=== 1960s ===
- heute (1963-present)

=== 1970s ===
- heute-journal (1978-present)
- Tagesthemen (1978-present)

=== 1980s ===
- Wetten, dass..? (1981-2014)
- Lindenstraße (1985–present)

== Networks and services ==
=== Launches ===
Network	Type	Launch date	Notes	Source
MDR Fernsehen	Cable and satellite	1 January		
RBB Berlin	Cable television	1 January		
RBB Brandenburg	Cable television	1 January		
Der Kabelkanal	Cable television	29 February		
Arte	Cable television	30 May		
n-tv	Cable television	30 November		

=== Conversions and rebrandings ===
Old network name	New network name	Type	Conversion Date	Notes	Source
RTLplus	RTL Television	Cable television	2 January		

=== Closures ===
Network	Type	End date	Notes	Sources
Tele 5	Cable television	31 December		
