= Jana Thiel =

German sports presenter and journalist

- Born: 17 October 1971; Peitz im Spreewald, Spreewald, Bezirk Cottbus, East Germany
- Died: 11 July 2016 (aged 44); Heidelberg, Baden-Württemberg, Germany
- Occupations: Journalist; Sports presenter
- Years active: 1989–2016
- Partner: Michael Stolle

Jana Thiel (17 October 1971 – 11 July 2016) was a German sports presenter and journalist for ZDF. She worked at the radio station Antenne Brandenburg before moving on to the sports department of Ostdeutscher Rundfunk Brandenburg. Thiel joined Deutsche Welle's television station DW-TV in 1999 and worked there until 2002. She began working at ZDF in 2000 as a sports reporter for the television programme ZDF-Morgenmagazin and then the broadcaster's primary sports department as an editor and presenter of the main evening sports bulletin on heute four years later. Thiel covered the Winter Olympic Games, the Summer Olympic Games, the Paralympic Games, Alpine skiing, the 2006 FIFA World Cup in Germany and the FEI World Equestrian Games.

== Biography ==
On 17 October 1971, Thiel was born in Peitz im Spreewald in the Spreewald. She was raised in Brandenburg. Thiel's career in journalist began in 1989 when she worked at the radio station Antenne Brandenburg, which was part of the Ostdeutscher Rundfunk Brandenburg (ORB) in Potsdam, as an editor, presenter and reporter. In 1994, she made the switch to television, working in the sports department of the ORB, to gain further experience. From 1997 to 1999, Thiel was a student of journalism at the Free University of Berlin whilst continuing her media career and broadening her knowledge.

She worked for the sports news department as a sports moderator for the news bulletin broadcast by the Deutsche Welle television station DW-TV from 1999 to 2002. Thiel began working part-time for the broadcaster ZDF and was a sports reporter for the television programme ZDF-Morgenmagazin in Berlin starting from 2000. She was nominated for a Deutscher Fernsehpreis award in the Best Sports Broadcast category for her coverage of the 2002 Tour de France and the 2002 Winter Olympics in Salt Lake City. In mid-2003, she was moved to present the afternoon and evening heute sport bulletins, temporarily replacing the former professional swimmer and broadcaster Kristin Otto, who was on maternity leave. Thiel was switched to ZDF's primary sports department in Mainz in October 2004, working as an editor and presenter of the main evening sports bulletin on heute.

She presented coverage as well as reported on coverage of each of the Winter Olympic Games, the Summer Olympic Games from the 2000 edition, and the Paralympic Games of 2004, 2008 and 2012. From 2005, Thiel presented broadcasts of ZDF-Sport-extra in which she covered Alpine winter sport competitions, which became one of her specialities. She presented coverage of the FIS Alpine Ski World Cup, the 2006 FIFA World Cup which was held in Germany, the FEI World Equestrian Games, and golf. The final year of Thiel's life (2016) saw her present coverage of the Alpine World Cup for the ZDF-Sport-extra programme as well as the sports bulletin on heute that May. She was working on writing a book prior to her death.

== Personal life and death ==
Thiel was in a long-term relationship with pole vaulter Michael Stolle. She was diagnosed with breast cancer in 2009 and underwent successful treatment, keeping her free of tumour cells until symptoms re-emerged in 2014. Thiel continued to work throughout her treatment but the cancer had metastasised to her lungs. On the morning of 11 July 2016, she died of her illness in the intensive care unit at Heidelberg University Clinic. Thiel was given a funeral four days later and she is buried at the south cemetery of Cottbus.

== Legacy ==
Joachim Huber of Der Tagesspiegel wrote of Thiel: "Anyone who saw and heard Jana Thiel during her moderation and interviews experienced a television journalist who concentrated on the finesse of a sport and the performance characteristics of an athlete. Hooray style was alien to her as well as a strenuous distance. She was involved, she wanted to convey to the audience what it could see – and what it couldn't see – without frills and undulating images. The information came first, she did not get involved in any vanity."
