= Anthony Lazaro =

Italian singer-songwriter

- Origin: Genoa, Italy
- Genre: Jazz pop
- Occupations: Singer-songwriter; musician
- Website: anthonylazaro.com

Anthony Lazaro is an Italian singer-songwriter who grew up in Genoa, Italy, and is based in Berlin.

His musical style blends genres such as jazz-pop, soul, bossa nova and folk.

== Career ==
=== Early career ===
On 24 July 2020, Lazaro released his first EP, Basement Love. The EP had premiered the previous day in American Songwriter, which described it as "delicately shaped" and defined its title track "almost watercolor-esque".

In November 2020, Clash covered the release of "Set Fire to the Night", the debut album by Lazaro's electronic side project Lazer Owl.

In March 2021, American Songwriter published an interview with Lazaro tied to the release of his single "Blank Spaces", describing him as an artist who "finds freedom in genre-less boundaries".

=== Later career ===
On 28 February 2026, Lazaro released the compilation Anthony Lazaro for Quiet Corner – Italian Graffiti, curated by Yuki Yamamoto. The 21-track compilation has been described as modern and sophisticated jazz-pop by CDJournal and includes collaborations with Jason LaPierre, Sarah Kang and Marle Thomson.

=== Sync placements ===
In 2023, Lazaro had two of his songs, "Gravity" and "Time Traveling" featuring Sarah Kang, included in the music archive of The Lunar Codex. The Lunar Codex is a cultural archive project that has sent the creative works of over 30,000 artists to the lunar surface as part of NASA's Commercial Lunar Payload Services programme.

The same year Turkish Airlines chose his song "Strangers in Disguise" for its official advertising campaign.

In 2025, two of his songs appeared in the soundtrack of the fifth season of the Netflix series Emily in Paris: "Mille Incendi" in episode 2 and "Le Luci Della Città" in episode 9.

His song "Mille Incendi" also appeared in the 2026 Hallmark Channel film Missing the Boat.

His songs have also been used in advertising campaigns for brands including Intimissimi, Samsung, Starbucks and Uniqlo. His music also appeared in the South Korean series Now, We Are Breaking Up, the US series Atlanta Medical, and the Netflix reality show Hype House.

== Tours ==
Lazaro began touring in 2024, with concerts in cities including Berlin, Amsterdam, Paris, Beijing, Shanghai, Tokyo and Seoul.

On 25 September 2024, Lazaro performed live at Mame Romantic in Tokyo, his only Japanese date during his Asian tour.

Between December 2024 and January 2025, Lazaro made his debut tour of India, with live performances in Pune, Mumbai, Jaipur, Gurugram, Kolkata, Hyderabad, Chennai, Bengaluru, Goa and New Delhi.

On 29 June 2026, the NDR regional news programme Hamburg Journal broadcast a report on Lazaro's self-managed career, covering his concert at the Knust club in Hamburg.

== Musical style ==
Lazaro's music draws primarily from jazz-pop, with influences from R&B, soul, bossa nova and folk.

He has an "appealing, resonant voice" and his vocal style has been compared to that of Michael Franks and John Pizzarelli.

Jason Scott from American Songwriter called him an artist who resists genre categorisation.

== Discography ==
=== Studio albums ===
- Rock Paper Scissors (2019)
- Strangers in Disguise (2020)
- The Guest List (2020)
- Time Traveling (2021)
- Strictly Two (2022)
- Sitting at the Edge of the World (2022)
- Sabbia (2022)
- Swinging on the Moon (2023)
- Maps and Clouds (2024)
- Little Earthquakes (2025)

=== Extended plays ===
- Basement Love (2020)
- A Minute to Midnight (2020)

=== Compilations ===
- Anthony Lazaro for Quiet Corner – Italian Graffiti (2026)

=== Singles ===
- Morning Bus (2024)
