= DFF Länderkette =

- Logo of the second channel from 1976 until the early 1980s.
- Country: East Germany; Germany (1990–1991)
- Broadcast area: East Germany
- Network: Deutscher Fernsehfunk (DFF)
- Headquarters: East Berlin (1969–1990); Berlin (1990–1991)

Programming
- Language: German

Ownership
- Owner: Deutscher Fernsehfunk
- Sister channels: DFF1

History
- Launched: 3 October 1969; 57 years ago
- Closed: 31 December 1991; 34 years ago
- Replaced by: N3 (Mecklenburg-Vorpommern); B1 (Berlin); ORB Fernsehen (Brandenburg); MDR Fernsehen (Saxony-Anhalt, Saxony, Thuringia)
- Former names: DFF2 (1969–1972); DDR2 (1972–1990)

DFF Länderkette (States' Network) was a television channel owned by Deutscher Fernsehfunk. Originally, it was founded in 1969 as DFF's second channel, and the first one to broadcast in colour. On 15 December 1990, it became DFF's single channel after DFF1 was used to carry ARD, until DFF's dissolution on 31 December 1991.

== History ==
DFF2 opened on 3 October 1969 with Walter Ulbrecht saying "The Second Programme is open". The date coincided with the twentieth anniversary of the founding of the DDR.

What initially set DFF2 apart from the newly-renamed DFF1 was the fact that it broadcast in colour, in the French SECAM system employed by the Warsaw Pact countries, in opposition to West Germany, which developed its own system, PAL. This made it the first of the USSR's satellite states to have a full colour service. It was also ahead of other "second channels" in the region, as it offered a full-week schedule, while others did only for three or four nights a week at most. The channel's initial goal was more cultural, compared to the open-formatted first channel.

An upsurge in viewers came after a 1982 programming decision to acquire TV series and feature films produced in capitalist countries such as France, Italy and the United States with most of the new viewer base came from border areas in West Germany. Elf 99 started airing on this channel on 1 September 1989.

On 15 December 1990, DFF was reformed following reunification and converted to PAL. Both channels coexisted that day until 20:00 when the former DFF1 subsequently handed over to ARD. DFF2's UHF network was kept and was used for the new Länderkette. The new channel opened at 07:00 of that day with a fifteen-minute introductory programme; this was repeated on DFF1 at 18:45 in preparation for the channel's closure an hour later. Aktuelle Kamera was replaced by a new news service, Aktuell, inserted as part of a 90-minute news block known as Das Abendjournal ZDF began broadcasting on 2 December, using a third network. This was a transitional measure until DFF's dissolution at the end of 1991, in line with Article 36 of the Unification Treaty which forsaw such dissolution. The name Ost 3 (East 3) was initially mooted, but was rejected by DFF staff due to its apparent similarities with "a third ARD channel on equal footing". With the end of Article 36 on 31 December 1991, Länderkette was shut down and its frequencies were used by MDR Fernsehen, ORB Fernsehen and an expansion of NDR Fernsehen to cover Mecklenburg-Vorpommern.
