= Radio B Zwei =

- Germany
- Broadcast area: Berlin; Brandenburg

Programming
- Language: German

Ownership
- Operator: Sender Freies Berlin (SFB)

History
- First air date: 22 February 1993
- Last air date: 26 August 1997

Radio B Zwei was a German, public radio station owned and operated by the Sender Freies Berlin (SFB). It was the second radio program of the SFB.

On February 22, 1993, the SFB launched Radio B Zwei, a first radio program in cooperation with the ORB. The new program was an information and service wave for Berlin and Brandenburg and was aimed at 25 to 50-year-old listeners. The previous SFB 2 program was merged into this program.

The further expansion of radio cooperation between ORB and SFB led to the discontinuation of Radio B Zwei on August 26, 1997. Radio Eins, a daytime accompanying program for listeners 25 years and older, went on the air as the successor station.

On the Berlin frequency 92.4 MHz, the Radio Kultur program was broadcast since October 3, 1997, which was replaced by kulturradio in 2003.
