= RBB Brandenburg =

- Country: (Germany)
- Broadcast area: Brandenburg
- Network: ARD
- Headquarters: Potsdam-Babelsberg

Programming
- Language: German

Ownership
- Owner: Ostdeutscher Rundfunk Brandenburg (1992–2003); Rundfunk Berlin-Brandenburg (2003–2004)
- Sister channels: RBB Berlin

History
- Launched: 1 January 1992; 34 years ago
- Replaced: DFF Länderkette
- Closed: 29 February 2004; 22 years ago
- Replaced by: rbb Fernsehen
- Former names: ORB-Fernsehen (1992–2003)

Availability

Streaming media
- RBB Brandenburg Livestream: Watch Live

RBB Brandenburg (until May 2003 ORB-Fernsehen) was the third television channel for Brandenburg, (Germany) from January 1992 to March 2004. Until May 2003, it was organized by Ostdeutscher Rundfunk Brandenburg (ORB), then by its successor, Rundfunk Berlin-Brandenburg (RBB). On 1 March 2004, the two regional television channels of RBB – RBB Brandenburg and RBB Berlin – were integrated into the new rbb Fernsehen.

== History ==
The programme was launched on 1 January 1992 under the name Fernsehen Brandenburg. In the initial build-up phase, the then ARD cultural television programme Eins Plus was taken over from 3 p.m. to 5.15 p.m. and after 9 pm, and for cost reasons there were initially only a few programmes of its own in the schedule. For example, the fact that the news programme was broadcast at 8:45 p.m. and the Brandenburg Journal at 7 p.m. was unusual for viewers in Brandenburg. Especially after the fall of communism, many East Germans had oriented themselves to the beginning time of the main news programme of Deutscher Fernsehfunk (DFF) at 7:30 pm. In general, the cooperation with Eins Plus did not lead to any high viewer acceptance.

This was soon followed by a programme reform on 1 May 1992. The main news programme Brandenburg aktuell received its slot at 7:30 pm, which is still valid today in the rbb Fernsehen programme. Later, further programmes with a regional character were added to the programme, such as the popular live programme with local audience participation. The ORB Aquarium was broadcast in the night programme from 1992 to 2004.

Beginning in July 1993, the station cooperated for several years with N3, the third television channel of Norddeutscher Rundfunk (NDR) and Radio Bremen (RB) for daytime programming.

One of the formats that has received a lot of attention and that still exists today at the RBB is Kowalski trifft Schmidt, a German-Polish programme that was created by Germans and Poles for mutual understanding. The programme, hosted by Ola Rosiak and Max Ruppert, was awarded the German-Polish journalism award in 2001 (hosted at the time by Anna Posnanska and Fabian Maier).

From 1 January 1998, the channel was broadcast in analogue form via the Astra 1B satellite and could thus be received throughout Europe. From May 2003 (merger of SFB and ORB to RBB) until the end of March 2004, the channel was broadcast under the name RBB Brandenburg.
