= RBB Berlin =

German television channel based in Berlin

- Country: Germany
- Broadcast area: Berlin
- Network: ARD
- Headquarters: Berlin

Programming
- Language: German

Ownership
- Owner: Sender Freies Berlin (1992–2003); Rundfunk Berlin-Brandenburg (2003–2004)
- Sister channels: RBB Brandenburg

History
- Launched: 1 October 1992; 34 years ago
- Replaced: DFF Länderkette
- Closed: 29 February 2004; 22 years ago
- Replaced by: rbb Fernsehen
- Former names: B1 (1992-2001); SFB1 (2001-2003)

Availability

Streaming media
- RBB Berlin Livestream: Watch Live

RBB Berlin (formerly B1 and SFB1) was the third television channel for Berlin, Germany from October 1992 until March 2004. Until May 2003 it was owned by Sender Freies Berlin (SFB), then by its successor, Rundfunk Berlin-Brandenburg (RBB), under the provisional name RBB Berlin. On 1 March 2004, the two previous regional television channels RBB Berlin and RBB Brandenburg were replaced by the new rbb Fernsehen.

== History ==
In 1965 Norddeutscher Rundfunk (NDR), Radio Bremen (RB) and Sender Freies Berlin (SFB) founded a joint third television programme, the Nordkette (later: Nord 3, N3 and today: NDR Fernsehen). NDR was in charge of the Nordkette. The SFB remained involved in the Nordkette until 1992.

Logo of SFB1 until April 2003.

After the German reunification, which also reunited both parts of Berlin, the SFB decided to launch its own regional television channel with a vision to create private regional programmes for Berlin in the near future. This program was called B1 (which stood for Berlin 1) and replaced the Berlin version of N3.

On 21 April 2001, the programme was renamed SFB1 at the same time as being broadcast on an analogue Astra satellite channel (daily from 6 p.m. to 2 a.m.). One reason for the renaming was that many inhabitants of Berlin had not associated the abbreviation B1 with the SFB.

From May 2003 onwards (merger of SFB and ORB to rbb), the programme was broadcast as rbb Berlin. At the end of March 2004, it was broadcast on the new rbb Fernsehen channel together with rbb Brandenburg. Since then, only the evening shows on Berlin's regional programme (Berliner Abendschau) and Brandenburg's regional programme (Brandenburg aktuell) have been broadcast separately every day for 30 minutes from 7.30 p.m. onwards.
