= Wuhladko =

- Presented by: Bogna Koreng (Bogna Korjeńkowa); Katharina Pöpel (Katka Pöpelec); Jakob Schäfer (Jakub Wowčer)
- Original languages: Upper Sorbian; German

Production
- Producer: Mitteldeutscher Rundfunk
- Production location: Bautzen

Original release
- Release: 13 September 2001

Wuhladko (Upper Sorbian for "prospect") is the name of a half-hour television programme in Upper Sorbian language. It has been broadcast every month since 2001 by Mitteldeutscher Rundfunk (MDR), and is presented by Bogna Koreng. The programme mainly deals with Sorbian topics from Upper Lusatia, but also deals with politics from Saxony and Germany, which affect the Sorbs throughout Lusatia.

The Sorbian people's contributions to culture, everyday life, politics, and traditions are the focus. The contributions are subtitled in German.

The Upper Sorbian television programme Wuhladko is the counterpart to the Lower Sorbian programme Łužyca, which in turn has been broadcast every 4 weeks since 1992 by the Rundfunk Berlin-Brandenburg (RBB; before its foundation by ORB). Christian Matthée present the Lower Sorbian TV magazine, alternating with Anja Pohontsch.
