= Adriana Rozwadowska =

Polish journalist and trade unionist

- Occupations: Journalist, trade unionist
- Employer: Gazeta Wyborcza
- Organization: Solidarity
- Title: President of the Solidarity trade union at Agora
- Predecessor: Wojciech Orliński

Adriana Rozwadowska is a Polish journalist, specializing in the issues of the job market, labour law and social policy. She has worked as a presenter at the German Rundfunk Berlin-Brandenburg television, and since 2015 has worked at the Gazeta Wyborcza daily newspaper. Since 2021 she is also the president of the Solidarity trade union at Agora, the newspaper's publisher.
