= Sachsenspiegel (TV program) =

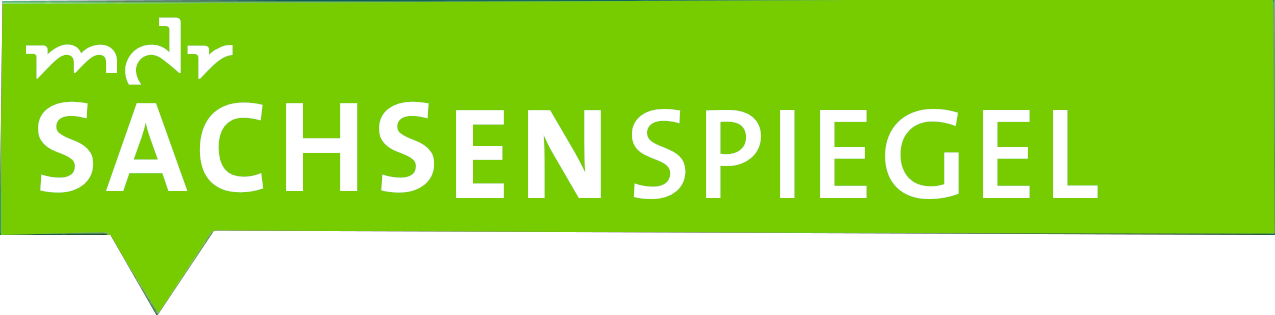
- Genre: regional news
- Country of origin: Germany
- Original language: German

Production
- Running time: 30 minutes

Original release
- Network: MDR Fernsehen
- Release: January 1992

Sachsenspiegel (German: [ˈzaksn̩ˌʃpiːɡl̩]; literally "Saxon Mirror") is a news programme on MDR Fernsehen, the regional television station of the German Mitteldeutscher Rundfunk.

The programme is shown from 7:00 to 7:30 p.m. and has been transmitted in the German state of Saxony since January 1992. For the first few years, the programme was only shown from Monday to Saturday but since 1997 it has also been on Sunday.

Sachsenspiegel features daily regional news on the topics of politics, the economy, sport, science and culture. Major national or international news is also reported at the beginning of the programme. The thirty-minute programme usually has three or four major items as well as additional minor items and an overview of the news. There is a separate sports section, which precedes the weather report. The predecessor of Sachsenspiegel was Bei uns in Sachsen, which, from 1988 to 1991, used to air at 6:45 to 7:00 p.m. on the former East German station Deutscher Fernsehfunk.

The programme is produced in the Saxon capital of Dresden. Since 21 July 2008, the programme has been made completely in a "virtual studio". The installation of the necessary tracking and rendering technology and the creation of the virtual studio world took almost one year to complete. The programme is repeated during the night.

MDR Sachsenspiegel can be received via the following systems: DVB-T, on the Internet via Zattoo, analog by cable and digital by cable and DVB-S. When Mitteldeutscher Rundfunk is received analog by satellite, the MDR news programme Länderzeit, transmitted from 7:00 to 7:30 p.m. includes a number of items from the regional programmes Sachsenspiegel, Sachsen-Anhalt heute and Thüringen Journal. Sachsenspiegel is transmitted via DVB-S on the regional channel MDR Sachsen. It is also streamed live on the MDR Web site.

== Presenters ==
Over the last 15 years, the studios and the presenters have changed. Beate Werner, who presented Sachsenspiegel for many years, as well as presenting its predecessor, is the most famous presenter of the show.

The current presenters are:

- Uta Georgi - Presenter
- Anja Koebel - Presenter
- Andreas F. Rook - Presenter
- Ramon Mirfendereski - Presenter
- Anna Funck - Presenter / reporter
- Almut Rudel - Sports presenter
- Sven Böttger - Sports presenter
- Susanne Langhans - Weather presenter
- Stephanie Meißner - Weather presenter
- Maira Rothe - Weather presenter
- Duy Tran - Weather presenter
