= Peitz =

Peitz Picnjo
- Town
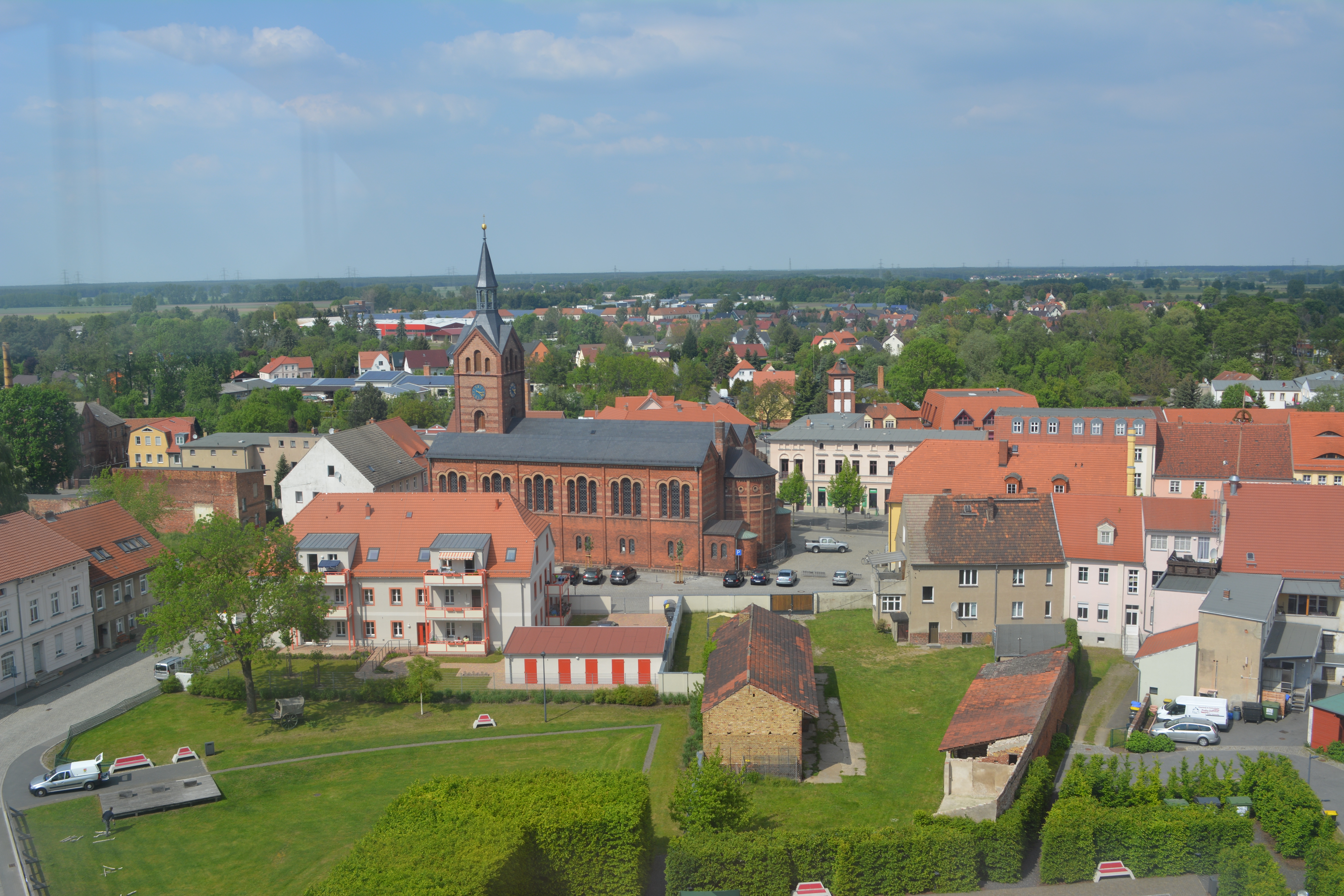

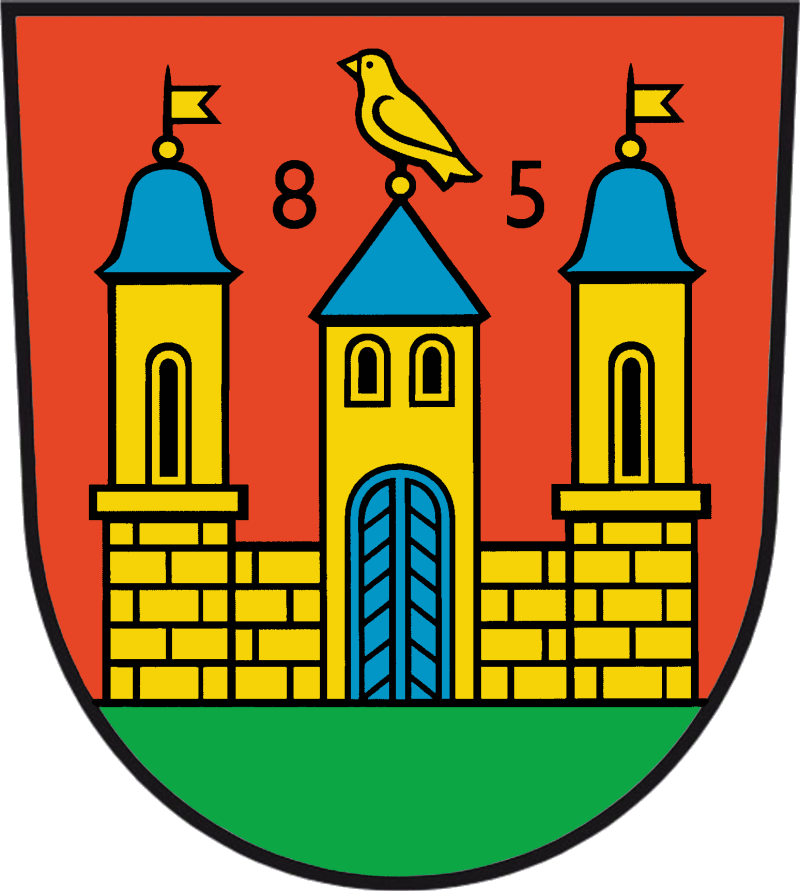
- Coat of arms

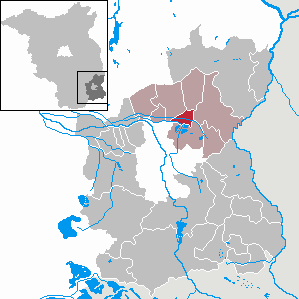
- Location of Peitz within Spree-Neiße district
- Interactive map of Peitz
- Location within Germany Location within Brandenburg
- Coordinates: 51°52′00″N 14°25′00″E
- Country: Germany
- State: Brandenburg
- District: Spree-Neiße
- Municipal assoc.: Peitz

Government
  - Mayor (2024–29): Jörg Krakow (Ind.)

Area
  - Total: 13.49 km^{2} (5.21 sq mi)
- Elevation: 61 m (200 ft)

Population (2025-12-31)
  - Total: 4,327
  - Density: 320.8/km^{2} (830.8/sq mi)
- Time zone: UTC+01:00 (CET)
  - Summer (DST): UTC+02:00 (CEST)
- Postal codes: 03185
- Dialling codes: 035601
- Vehicle registration: SPN
- Website: www.peitz.de

Peitz (German: [paɪts]; Lower Sorbian: Picnjo) is a town in the district of Spree-Neiße, in Lower Lusatia, Brandenburg, in eastern Germany.

== Overview ==
It is situated 13 kilometres (8 mi) northeast of Cottbus. Surrounded by freshwater lakes, it is well known for its fishing industry. The town was at one time on the border between the states of Brandenburg and Saxony, and was formerly protected by strong artillery fortifications built in brick, dating from the 16th century. Only small parts of these remain.

== History ==
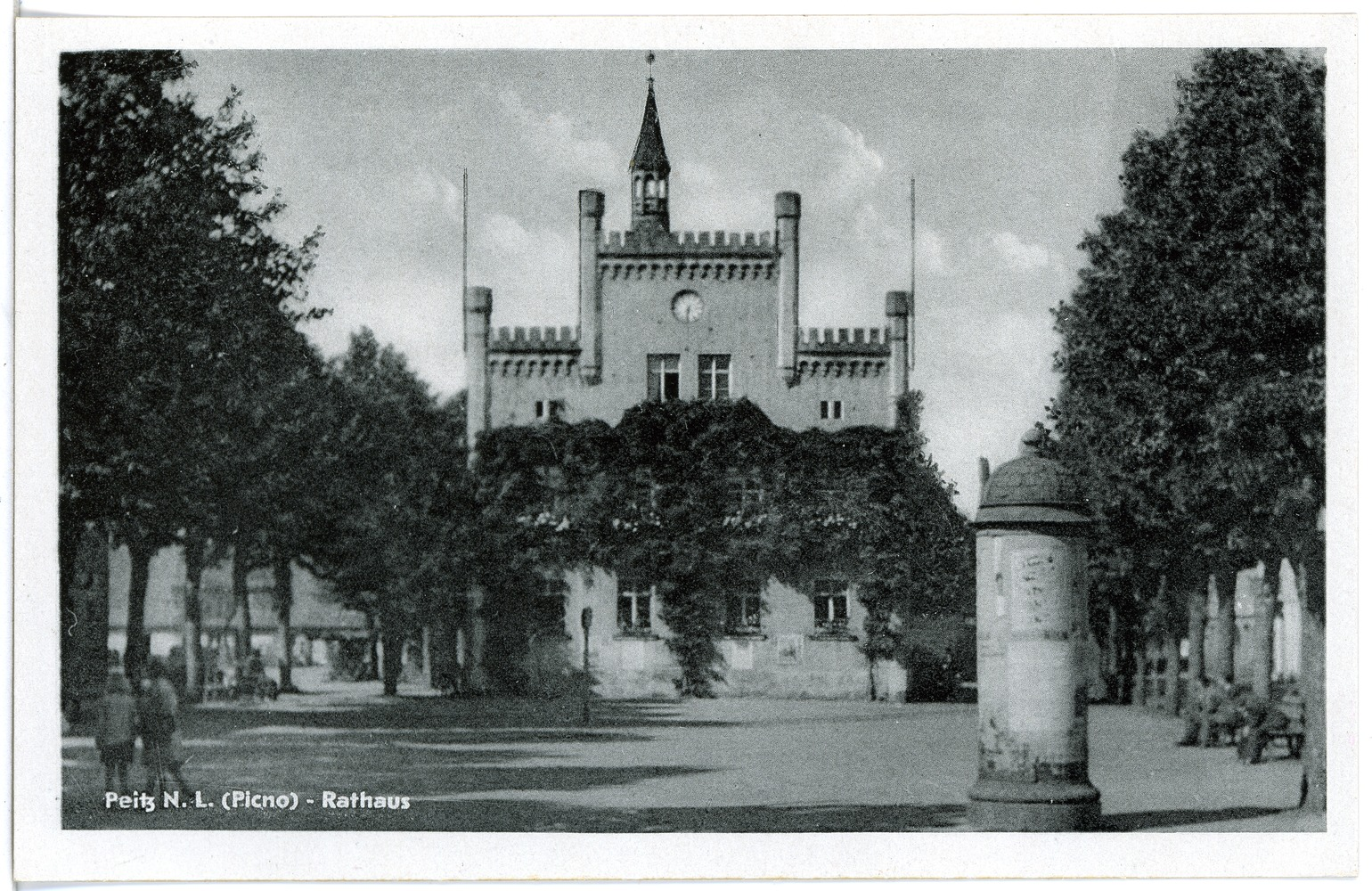
Town hall in the 1950s

From 1661 to 1678, Peitz was the place of imprisonment of Hieronymus Roth, leader of the opposition of the city of Königsberg against Frederick William, Elector of Brandenburg, and opponent of the secession of the city from the Kingdom of Poland.

From 1815 to 1947, Peitz was part of the Prussian Province of Brandenburg.

After World War II, Peitz was incorporated into the State of Brandenburg from 1947 to 1952 and the Bezirk Cottbus of East Germany from 1952 to 1990. Since 1990, Peitz has been part of Brandenburg.

== Demography ==
Development of population since 1875 within the current Boundaries (Blue Line: Population; Dotted Line: Comparison to Population development in Brandenburg state; Grey Background: Time of Nazi Germany; Red Background: Time of communist East Germany)

=== Noted People ===
Lilly Kann (British film character actress) - (Born Peitz, 1893). Though the BFI website claims she was born in Berlin.

Peitz: Population development
within the current boundaries (2013)

Year	Pop.	±% p.a.
1875	3,431	—
1890	4,098	+1.19%
1910	4,570	+0.55%
1925	3,414	−1.93%
1933	3,515	+0.37%
1939	3,846	+1.51%
1946	5,449	+5.10%
1950	5,077	−1.75%
1964	4,473	−0.90%
1971	4,395	−0.25%
1981	6,384	+3.80%
1985	6,073	−1.24%
1989	5,676	−1.68%
1990	5,582	−1.66%
1991	6,103	+9.33%
1992	4,853	−20.48%
1993	6,189	+27.53%
1994	6,137	−0.84%
1995	6,377	+3.91%
1996	6,468	+1.43%

Year	Pop.	±% p.a.
1997	6,568	+1.55%
1998	5,689	−13.38%
1999	5,549	−2.46%
2000	5,478	−1.28%
2001	5,266	−3.87%
2002	5,375	+2.07%
2003	5,277	−1.82%
2004	5,414	+2.60%
2005	5,033	−7.04%
2006	4,971	−1.23%
2007	4,866	−2.11%
2008	4,792	−1.52%
2009	4,684	−2.25%
2010	4,597	−1.86%
2011	4,500	−2.11%
2012	4,420	−1.78%
2013	4,449	+0.66%
2014	4,369	−1.80%
2015	4,445	+1.74%
2016	4,400	−1.01%

== People ==
- 1893: Lily Kann, actress
- 1969: Jörg Schwanke, footballer
- 1971: Jana Thiel, journalist
