= DFF1 =

- Logo of the first channel from 1976 until the early 1980s.
- Country: East Germany
- Broadcast area: Nationwide
- Network: Deutscher Fernsehfunk (DFF)
- Headquarters: East Berlin (1969–1990); Berlin (1990)

Programming
- Language: German

Ownership
- Owner: Deutscher Fernsehfunk
- Sister channels: DFF Länderkette

History
- Launched: 21 December 1952; 73 years ago
- Closed: 15 December 1990; 35 years ago
- Replaced by: ARD
- Former names: Fernsehzentrum Berlin (1952–1956); Deutscher Fernsehfunk (1956–1969); DFF1 (1969–1972); DDR1 (1972–1990)

DFF1 was the flagship channel of Deutscher Fernsehfunk, East Germany's national television network. It began experimental broadcasts in 1952; these became regular in 1956. The channel closed on the evening of 15 December 1990, after which its transmitter network was handed over to ARD.

== History ==
The channel started experimental broadcasts on 21 December 1952 as Fernsehzentrum Berlin. It broadcast only two hours a day, although the service was mostly experimental in nature. During its early months, 75% of its programming consisted of static images. Regular service began on 3 January 1956. The full service sought to cover all of West Germany, however the transmitter network was not strong enough to carry the task. With the launch of DFF2 on 3 October 1969, the channel was renamed DFF1.

In 1973, colour transmissions began, four years after DFF2/DDR2, using the SECAM standard.

On 15 December 1990, DFF1 had its last day on air, in accordance with Article 36. The channel's transmitter network was replaced with ARD's, which would broadcast "in higher quality". ARD simply accepted DFF's request to share programming on the same network, in exchange, DFF started airing ARD programming. In the early months, ARD aired "East German imports" such as Ein Kessel Buntes and Plauener Spitze, while the combined ARD-ZDF Morgenmagazin would add gymnastics, inherited from the former DFF morning programme. The final day on air consisted largely of entertainment output, such as Der scharfe Kanal, a Der schwarze Kanal special highlighting 1990, as well as a 18:45 repeat of the DFF Länderkette launch programme, which had already been seen at 07:00 on the former DFF2. After the regional news programmes, at 19:58, DFF1 was switched off. Under the principle that "two heads are better than one", viewers were introduced to a male ARD (Dénes Törzs) and a female DFF (Annette Richter-Judt) presenters, introducing the special evening; after Tagesschau, the special concert Musikanten sind da (Here Come the Musicians) was broadcast from the Berlin TV Tower.
