= ARD 1 Plus =

Ownership
- Owner: ARD

History
- Launched: 29 March 1986; 39 years ago
- Closed: 30 November 1993; 31 years ago (7 years, 246 days)

ARD 1 Plus was a German cultural television channel, which was broadcast as an offshoot of Das Erste from 29 March 1986 to 30 November 1993. The program scheme was similar to Arte, except for bilingualism.

1 Plus also served as the test channel for European HDTV development HD-MAC, which made good progress until the live broadcast of the 1992 Summer Olympics in Barcelona, but was then unable to receive European funding under pressure from the United Kingdom government.

For cost reasons and the broadcaster's impending inclusion as a cooperative member for the existing cultural channel 3sat at that time, ARD decided to close 1 Plus on November 30, 1993.

The responsibility for the management of 1 Plus was ARD-internally at the then Südwestfunk in Baden-Baden.

1 Plus was broadcast terrestrially via cable and satellite, as well in Saarland (Saarbrücken) and in Bremen via antenna. 1 Plus was received via satellite via Astra 1B, DFS Kopernikus and in D2-MAC via TV-SAT 2 until the channel closed. The broadcast of 1 Plus over the frequently used Astra satellites ended at the end of August 1993, since Das Erste took over the transponder itself. In addition, large parts of the programming of 1 Plus from early to mid-1992 were broadcast in Berlin and Brandenburg on the frequencies of the Ostdeutscher Rundfunk Brandenburg (ORB). It was replaced by EinsPlus in 1997.
