= Bogna Koreng =

German journalist and television presenter (born 1965)

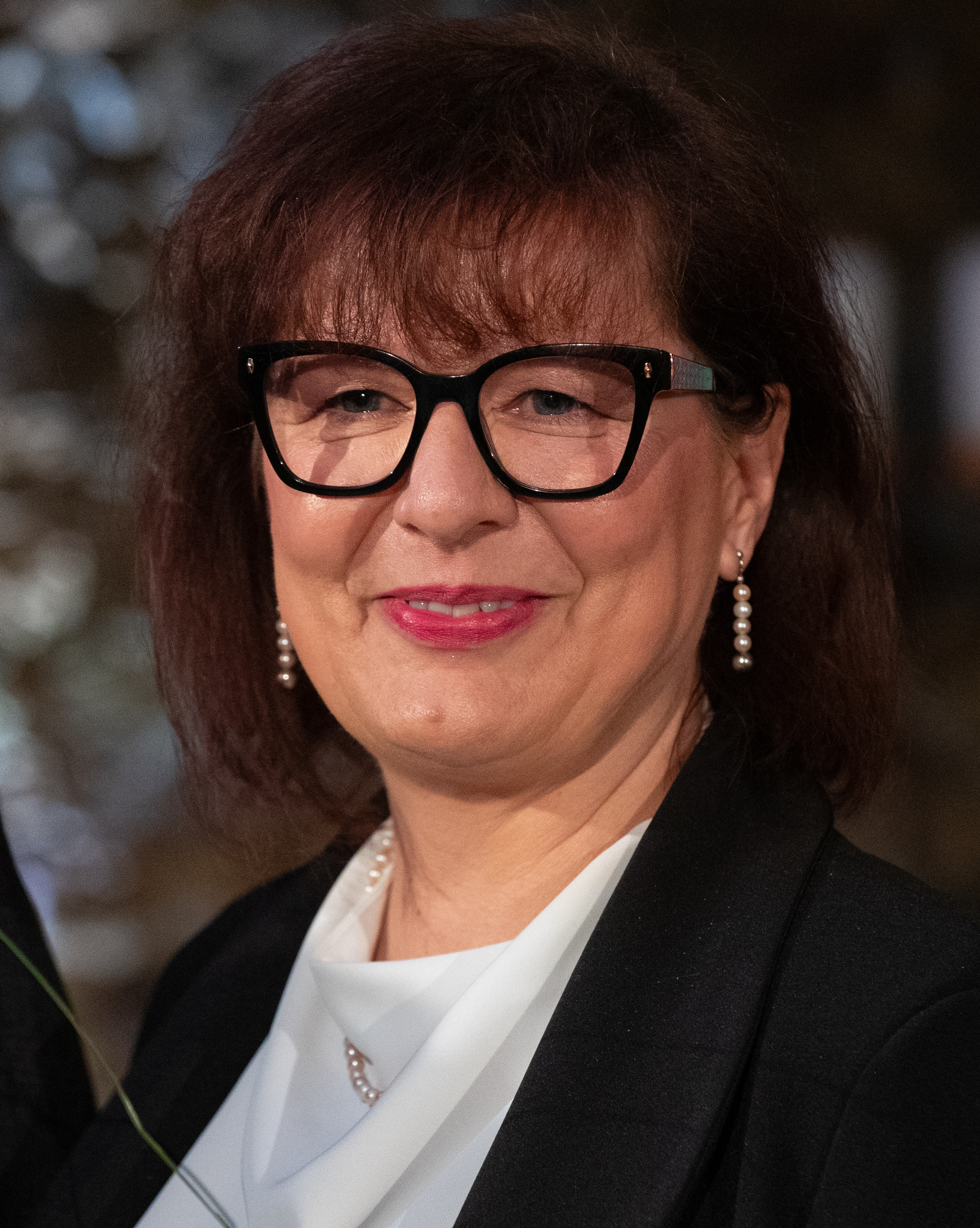
- Koreng in 2025
- Born: 1965 (age 60–61); Bautzen, Germany
- Occupation: Journalist
- Years active: 1992–
- Notable work: Wuhladko

Bogna Koreng (Upper Sorbian: Bogna Korjeńkowa; 1965 in Bautzen, East Germany) is a Sorbian journalist and TV presenter.

== Biography ==
Bogna Koreng grew up in a bilingual environment in Radibor. Her parents spoke Upper Sorbian to her, but her linguistic environment was German. Koreng studied German studies after her Abitur in Leipzig and worked as a teacher and choirmaster at the Sorbisches Gymnasium (the only Upper Sorbian-language highschool) in Bautzen for two years afterwards. After the Wende in 1992, she started working as a freelance journalist at Sorbischer Rundfunk, a Sorbian-language radio program. Since 2001, she is the presenter of the Upper Sorbian TV show Wuhladko. Furthermore, she is head of the Mitteldeutscher Rundfunk's studio in Bautzen since 2003.

Her show was awarded the third prize in the International Television and Radio Festival of National Minorities, in which more than 60 European ethnic groups participate.

Bogna Koreng lives with her family in Panschwitz-Kuckau. During the electoral period of 2015–2019, she was a member of the board of the Foundation for the Sorbian People (Stiftung für das sorbische Volk).
