= Patricia Schlesinger =

German television journalist (born 1961)

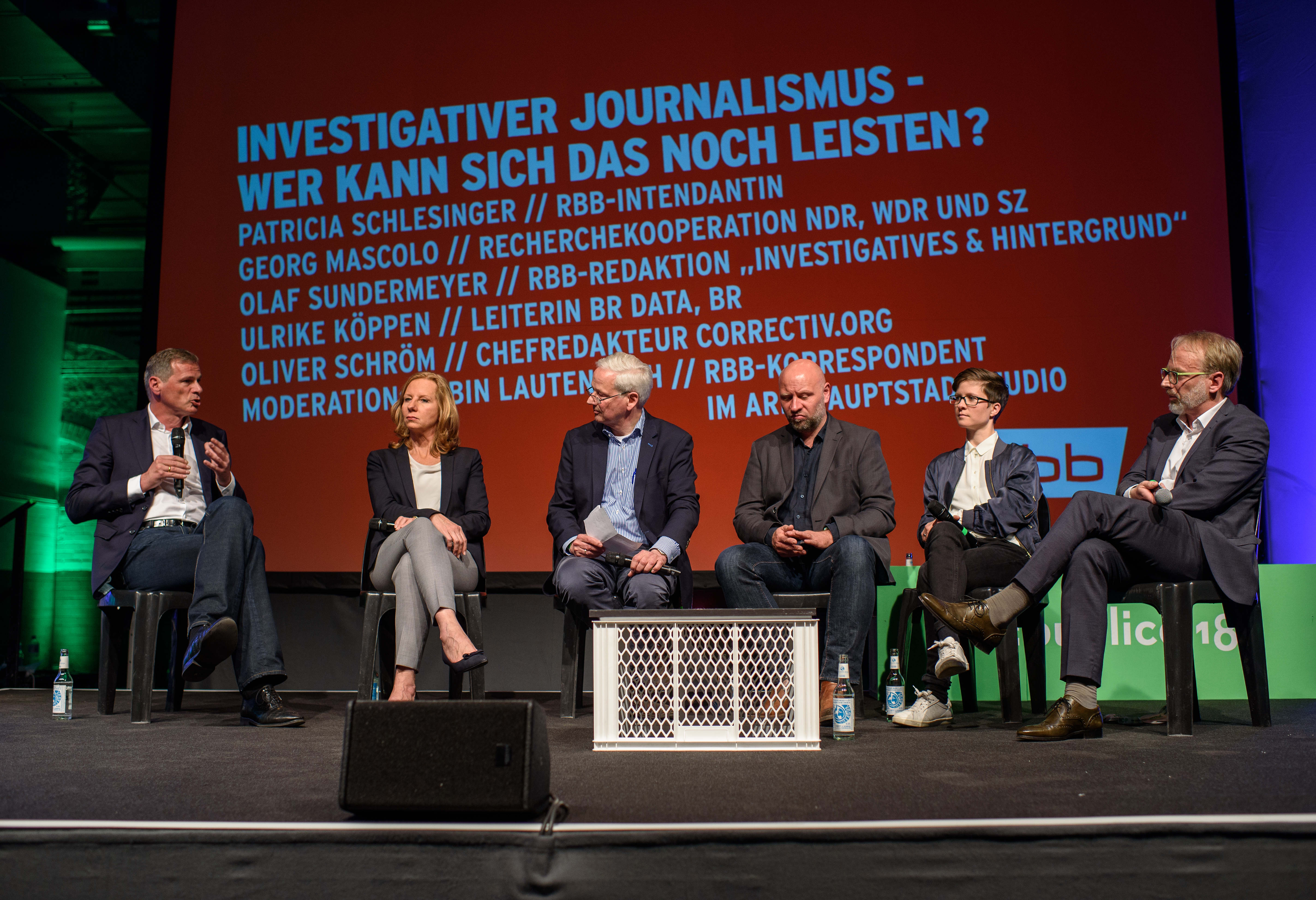
- Born: 14 July 1961 (age 64); Hanover, West Germany
- Occupations: journalist; television presenter

Patricia Schlesinger (born 14 July 1961 in Hanover, Germany) is a German journalist, television presenter, former director of national broadcaster Rundfunk Berlin-Brandenburg (RBB), and former chair of public broadcast network ARD.

In April 2016 the highest RBB council, led by Friederike von Kirchbach, designated Schlesinger to follow Dagmar Reim as RBB director (RBB-Intendantin).

In 2020 the RBB increased Schlesingers basic salary by 16 % to Euro 303,000 , bonus payments in 2021 reached an additional Euro 20,000 according to press research.

In August 2022, Schlesinger resigned both from the directorship and the chair after allegations of misconduct and reckless spending had become public. She and the former head of the RBB's board of directors, real estate entrepreneur Wolf-Dieter Wolf, were sued by the RBB for damages.
