= Brandenburg aktuell =

- Also known as: rbb24 Brandenburg aktuell
- Presented by: Gerald Meyer; Tatjana Jury; Mark Langebeck; Elvira Siebert; Dirk Platt; Peter Wachsmann; Manina Ferreira-Erlenbach; Christina Derlien; Ingo Bötig
- Country of origin: Germany
- Original language: German

Production
- Producer: Rundfunk Berlin-Brandenburg
- Production location: Potsdam-Babelsberg

Original release
- Network: RBB Fernsehen
- Release: 2 May 1992

Former logo (2018-2022)

rbb24 Brandenburg aktuell (until 27 March 2022 Brandenburg aktuell) is the television magazine of Rundfunk Berlin-Brandenburg (rbb) for the state of Brandenburg. The programme is broadcast daily on rbb Fernsehen at 7:30 p.m., while the viewers in Berlin receive the Abendschau. The magazine informs about political and cultural life in Brandenburg and provides background information on special events. Also the sport in Brandenburg as well as homeland stories from Brandenburg are topics of the show. In the early years, national and international reports were shown in Brandenburg aktuell, but these were abolished in 2000 when ORB Fernsehen began simulcasting the main 8:00pm edition of Tagesschau from Das Erste.

The first programme was broadcast on 2 May 1992, at that time still from the barrack 38 of the film area in Babelsberg. In 1996, ORB erected new buildings for television and radio operations there. Since the merger of ORB and SFB to the rbb, a joint television programme has been produced for the states of Berlin and Brandenburg; both federal states only receive their own regional news between 7.30 pm and 8 pm.

== Landschleicher ==
Since 28 March 1993, the weekly "Landschleicher" draw has been an integral part of the programme - every weekend a Brandenburg town with a population of less than 2,000 is drawn lots and portrayed.

== Location ==
Brandenburg aktuell is currently produced in Studio 2 of the rbb television center in Potsdam-Babelsberg.

== Audience ==
Brandenburg aktuell achieved a market share of 23.3% in Brandenburg in 2017 and a viewing audience of 230,000 per broadcast.

== Presenters ==
- Gerald Meyer (1992–present)
- Tatjana Jury (1992–present)
- Marc Langebeck (2012–present)
- Franziska Maushake (2019–present)
- Alina Stiegler (2021–present)
- Andreas Rausch (2022–present)
- Elvira Siebert (2005-2011)
- Dirk Platt (2008-2018)
- Peter Wachsmann (1992-2020)
- Manina Ferreira-Erlenbach (2001-2014)
- Frank Thomas (1999-2006)
- Christina Paulisch (2004–present)
- Ingo Bötig (2008–present)
- Franziska Hoppen (2021–present)
