= Antenne Brandenburg =

German radio station

- Berlin and Brandenburg; Germany
- Frequencies: 8 FM frequencies (see below); 7D and 10B (DAB+)
- RDS: Antenne_/vom_rbb_

Programming
- Language: German
- Format: Oldie-based AC

Ownership
- Operator: Rundfunk Berlin-Brandenburg (rbb)
- Sister stations: rbb 88.8; Radioeins; Fritz; Radio 3 rbb24 Inforadio

History
- First air date: 6 May 1990

Links
- Webcast: Listen Live
- Website: antennebrandenburg.de

Antenne Brandenburg is a German, public radio station owned and operated by the Rundfunk Berlin-Brandenburg (rbb) for the state of Brandenburg. It plays an adult contemporary format with a focus on 70s and 80s music and regional news. It launched on 5 May 1990 and was formerly produced by Ostdeutscher Rundfunk Brandenburg (ORB) until May 2003.

As of 2023, the station has about 500,000 daily listeners.

== Frequencies ==
Antenne Brandenburg is available via FM broadcasting and DAB+ in Berlin and Brandenburg, vie DVB-C across Germany, via satellite ASTRA 1H (DVB-S) across Europe and via livestreaming worldwide.

Frequency [MHz]	Region
99.7	Berlin and Havelland (broadcast from Fernsehturm)
106.6	Prignitz
99.4	Prenzlau
91.1	Uckermark
87.6	Märkisch-Oderland
106.2	Teltow-Fläming
98.6	Spreewald and Lausitz
100.9	Spree-Neiße
