= NDR Fernsehen =

Free-to-air regional television channel for northern Germany

- Country: Germany
- Broadcast area: Bremen, Hamburg, Lower Saxony, Mecklenburg-Vorpommern & Schleswig-Holstein, also distributed nationally
- Headquarters: Hamburg, Germany

Programming
- Picture format: 576i (16:9 SDTV); 720p (1080p (DVB-T2 only))

Ownership
- Owner: Norddeutscher Rundfunk (NDR); Radio Bremen (RB)

History
- Launched: 4 January 1965; 61 years ago
- Former names: Norddeutsches Fernsehen; Nord 3 (1965–1988); N3 (1989–2001)

Links
- Website: ndrfernsehen.de

Availability

Terrestrial
- Digital terrestrial television: Channel 3 (Bremen, Hamburg, Lower Saxony, Mecklenburg-Vorpommern & Schleswig-Holstein)

Streaming media
- NDR.de: Watch live
- Ziggo GO (Netherlands): ZiggoGO.tv (Europe only)

NDR Fernsehen is a German free-to-air regional television channel targeting northern Germany, specifically the states of Schleswig-Holstein, Lower Saxony, Mecklenburg-Vorpommern, Hamburg and Bremen.

It is broadcast by both Norddeutscher Rundfunk (NDR) and Radio Bremen, although the former provides most of the output as they are bigger than the latter. It is one of seven regional "third programmes" offered by the ARD members.

== History ==
It started broadcasting on 4 January 1965 as the common channel of NDR, Radio Bremen and Sender Freies Berlin (SFB). It eventually adopted the name "Nord 3", later "N3". In 1992, the stations broadcast area changed as Mecklenburg-Vorpommern was added to NDR after the German reunification and SFB left the N3 cooperation in October to start its own channel, B1 (now rbb Fernsehen). The name "NDR Fernsehen" was adopted in 2001.

The channel is available in five different feeds for the broadcast of local programmes in the early evening. Four of the areas are branded "NDR Fernsehen", while in the Bremen area, only NDR NDS is available.

- NDR Fernsehen Hamburg (NDR FS HH) with Hamburg Journal.
- NDR Fernsehen Mecklenburg-Vorpommern (NDR FS MV) with Nordmagazin.
- NDR Fernsehen Niedersachsen (NDR FS NDS) with Hallo Niedersachsen.
- NDR Fernsehen Schleswig-Holstein (NDR FS SH) with Schleswig-Holstein Magazin.

The NDR-branded areas generally broadcast a shorter news bulletin at 18:00 and a half-hour bulletin at 19:30. As with most of the other third channels, NDR Fernsehen simulcasts the main 20:00 edition of Tagesschau.

The channel was initially only available terrestrially in its designated area, but since it became available on satellite and cable television it is available nationally. Many Danish and Dutch cable networks also relay the signal.

== Logos and identities ==
1965 to 1988

1989 to 2 December 2001

3 December 2001 to 2006

2006 to 2017

HD logo since 30 April 2012
