= Sender Freies Berlin =

Public radio and television service by ARD

- Type: Terrestrial radio and television
- Country: Germany
- Broadcast area: Berlin
- Launch date: 1 June 1953
- Dissolved: 1 May 2003
- Replaced by: Rundfunk Berlin-Brandenburg (RBB)

Sender Freies Berlin (German: [ˈzɛndɐ ˈfʁaɪəs bɛʁˈliːn]; abbreviated SFB [ˌɛsʔɛfˈbeː]; English: "Radio Free Berlin") was the ARD public radio and television service for Berlin from 1 June 1954 until 30 April 2003. On 1 January 1992, SFB became the public broadcaster for the whole of reunited Berlin. However, SFB had long had a significant audience in East Berlin for some time before German reunification. On 1 May 2003 it merged with Ostdeutscher Rundfunk Brandenburg to form Rundfunk Berlin-Brandenburg.

== History ==
=== Pre-war ===
In 1922, the Deutsche Stunde, Gesellschaft für drahtlose Belehrung und Unterhaltung mbH (German Society for Wireless Instruction and Entertainment Limited) was formed to promote the new science of radio broadcasting and reception. This institution began broadcasting on 29 October 1923 from Berlin.

In 1933, German broadcasting was brought under Nazi state control and the station became Reichssender Berlin, part of the national Großdeutscher Rundfunk, controlled by Joseph Goebbels. The station was closed by the Allies at the end of the Battle of Berlin that brought the End of World War II in Europe.

=== Post-war ===
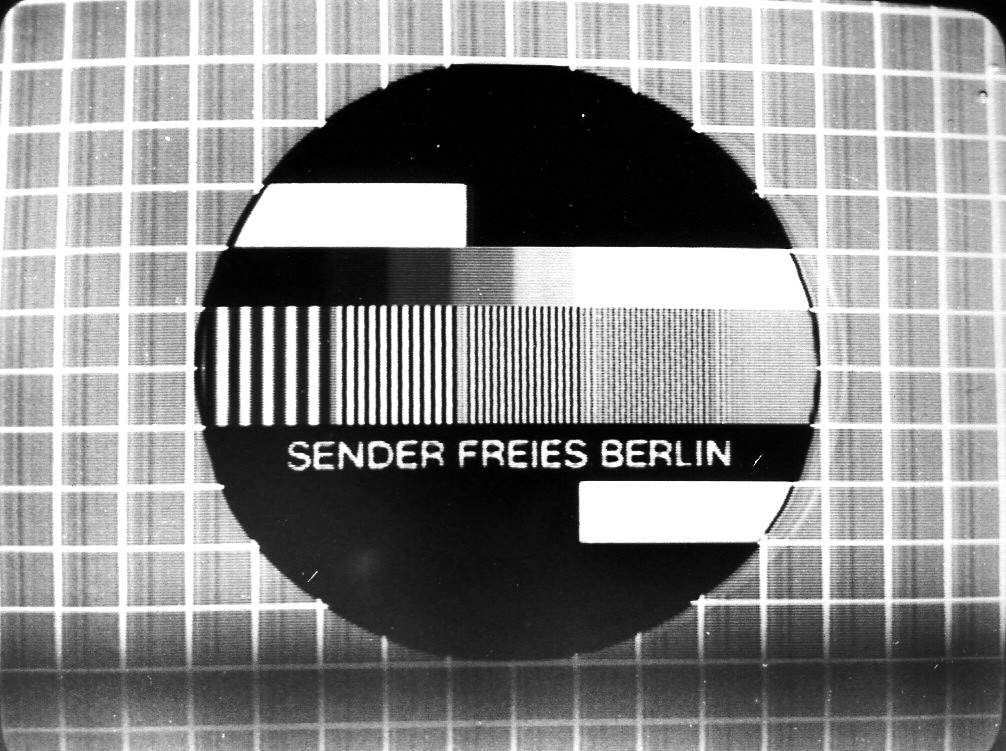
Early electronically generated monochrome test card of SFB, photographed in 1975. This test card was also used by SDR and SWF in southwest Germany, and Sjónvarpið in Iceland.

In the post-war four-power occupation of Germany, the British Control Commission appointed Hugh Greene to restart German broadcasting in the British Zone. The first station on-air was Radio Hamburg. This was followed by the setting up of Nordwestdeutscher Rundfunk (NWDR) as the broadcasting corporation for the entire British Zone and for Berlin. Similarly, the United States created Rundfunk im amerikanischen Sektor (RIAS) for their zone in Berlin.

In 1948, NWDR was transferred to German control (RIAS remained American-controlled).

In 1950, NWDR began two second radio services in its area on FM, NDR2 in the north and WDR2 in the west. In 1952, NWDR pioneered the launching of 625-line television broadcasting in (West) Germany.

=== East German uprising ===
In June and July 1953, a strike by construction workers in the German Democratic Republic (GDR) led to an uprising of the people of the communist state which was violently put down by Soviet forces and the Volkspolizei.

The government of the GDR accused RIAS of fanning the flames of the uprising and reporting inaccurately. This led to calls for West Berlin to have its own independent broadcaster as in the other Länder.

A law was passed to establish this new broadcaster, which came into force on 12 November 1953, separating West Berlin from NWDR. The new Sender Freies Berlin began broadcasting two services, SFB1 and SFB2 on 1 June 1954, and joined the ARD in September 1954.

SFB began broadcasting the ARD's television service in 1958.

SFB's radio and television signals as well as covering West Berlin were receivable in many parts of East Germany; similarly, East German radio and television were receivable throughout West Berlin. As with television in Austria, SFB's broadcasts had a larger audience outside its intended target. East and West thus aggressively competed to influence viewers. SFB received an unusually large 8% quota of the ARD broadcast schedule, and a financial subsidy from other network members.

=== Third Programmes ===
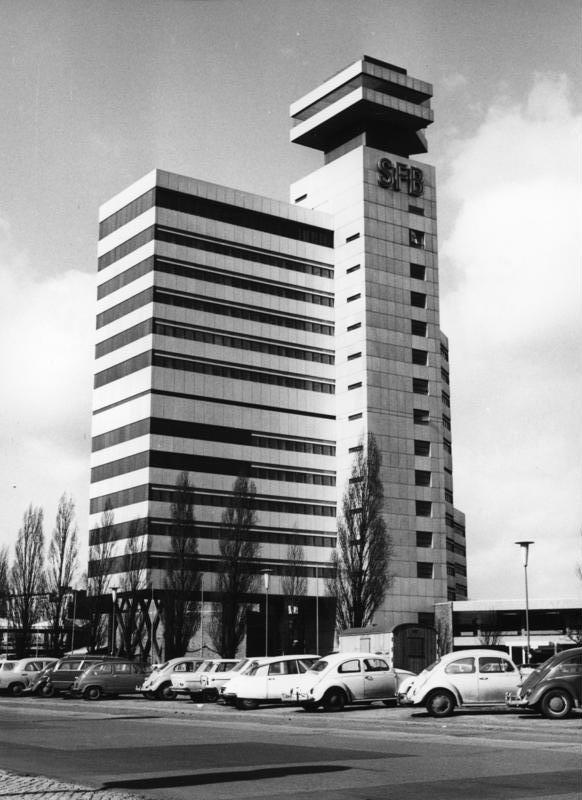
Sender Freies Berlin TV Centre (now RBB-Zentrale Berlin)

On 1 October 1962 SFB and Norddeutscher Rundfunk (NDR) began broadcasting the high-culture and classical music Drittes Programm (Third Programme), modeled on the British BBC Third Programme. This was joined by a service for immigrant workers on 1 June 1973, and became a separate service known as SFB3 on 1 April 1979.

On 4 January 1965, a third public television service was started, joining ARD (Das Erste) and ZDF. SFB and Radio Bremen both relayed the service provided by NDR – Nord 3 (later N3). The best known programme on Nord 3 was "KONTRASTE", a political magazine that concentrated on developments in the Eastern bloc.

N3's teletext service, Nordtext (later NDR-Text), carried information for West Berlin.

=== 1989–2003 ===
With the fall of the Berlin Wall in 1989, and the subsequent German reunification in 1990, Berlin was left with duplicate broadcasting outlets from the two administrations – SFB from the west and Berliner Rundfunk (radio) and Fernsehen der DDR (DDR, later DFF) (television) from the east.

On 1 January 1992, with the dissolution of Deutscher Fernsehfunk, SFB became the public broadcasting company for the whole of reunited Berlin. However, SFB had long had a significant audience in East Berlin for some time before reunification. The radio station SFB1 became Berlin 88,8 (later 88acht and now radioBerlin 88,8). In October 1992, N3's frequency was replaced by SFB's full-fledged service for the capital, B1 (Berlin Eins), later SFB1.

The GDR's national television service was closed and replaced by four ARD regions: an expanded NDR in the north; the continuing SFB in Berlin; and the new Mitteldeutscher Rundfunk (MDR) in the south and Ostdeutscher Rundfunk Brandenburg (ORB – East German Broadcasting – Brandenburg) in the east.

On 22 February 1993, the SFB began a joint venture with the new ORB to create Radio BZWEI, a news and information service for the east of the country aimed at 25 to 50-year-old listeners. On 1 March 1993, the two broadcasters launched Fritz, a radio station for young people.

On 18 September 1994, SFB launched RADIOmultikulti (SFB4), a service for foreign nationals and immigrants to Germany. This was joined by InfoRADIO, a SFB/ORB joint venture news station, on 28 August 1995.

In 1995 the Ostdeutscher Rundfunk Brandenburg in coalition with the Sender Freies Berlin started their Internet radio streaming service Info-Radio on Demand.

On 3 October 1997, SFB and ORB launched RADIOkultur, a cultural station taking up much of the programming of SFB3, with an emphasis on classic, world, jazz and new music and politics.

=== Merger ===
Having co-operated on many of services, SFB and ORB merged on 1 May 2003 to form Rundfunk Berlin-Brandenburg (RBB).

== SFB stations ==
=== Television ===
==== Joint operations ====
- Das Erste – ARD joint channel
- Phoenix – ARD and ZDF joint events channel
- KiKa – ARD and ZDF joint children's channel
- Arte – French-German culture channel
- 3sat – ARD, ZDF, ORF, and SRG joint highbrow channel

==== Own network ====
- SFB1 (formerly B1) – "third" television channel for Berlin

=== Radio ===
The stations before German reunification were different: SFB 1 (generalist), SFB 2 (musical, competing with the eastern DT64), SFB 3 (classical music, collaboration with WDR) and Radio 4U (youth).

- SFB 1 (from 1 June 1954 until 1 January 1992, then as 88acht)
- SFB 2 (from 1 June 1954 until 22 February 1993, then in co-operation with ORB as Radio B Zwei)
- SFB 3 (from 1 April 1979 to 2 October 1997), then merged into Radio Kultur (ORB) and Radio 3 (1997–2000, ORB and NDR)
- SFB 4 (until 29 April 1990) then as Radio 4U until 31 December 1992 and since 1 March 1993 as Fritz (ORB)
- Berlin 88,8 (later 88acht and now rbb 88,8) – local radio for Berlin
- Radio Multikulti (formerly SFB4 MultiKulti) – station for foreign workers and immigrants

==== Co-operation with ORB ====
- Fritz – youth radio
- Inforadio – information station
- Radio Kultur – culture station
- Radioeins – entertainment station

== Directors-General ==
- 1954–1957: Alfred Braun
- 1957–1960: Walter Geerdes
- 1961–1968: Walter Steigner
- 1968–1978: Franz Albert Barsig
- 1978–1983: Wolfgang Haus
- 1983–1986: Lothar Loewe
- 1986–1989: Günter Herrmann
- 1989–1997: Dr Günther von Lojewski
- 1998–2003: Horst Schättle
