= Ostdeutscher Rundfunk Brandenburg =

- Country: Germany
- Headquarters: Potsdam

Programming
- Language: German

History
- Founded: 12 October 1991
- Closed: 30 April 2003
- Replaced by: Rundfunk Berlin-Brandenburg

Links
- Website: http://www.orb.de

Ostdeutscher Rundfunk Brandenburg (ORB; East German Broadcasting Brandenburg), based in Potsdam, was the public broadcaster for the German federal state of Brandenburg from 12 October 1991 until 30 April 2003. It was a member organization of the consortium of public-law broadcasting organizations in Germany, ARD.

ORB merged with the Berlin public broadcaster Sender Freies Berlin (SFB) on 1 May 2003 to form Rundfunk Berlin-Brandenburg (RBB). Signals began as members of Deutscher Fernsehfunk.

== History ==
Following German reunification, ARD expanded its membership to include public broadcasters in the territory of the former German Democratic Republic (GDR). Four public-broadcasting organizations replaced those of the former GDR: the already existing Hamburg-based Norddeutscher Rundfunk in the north; the already existing West Berlin-based SFB, now covering all of the city; the new Mitteldeutscher Rundfunk for the states of Thuringia, Saxony, and Saxony-Anhalt; and the new Ostdeutscher Rundfunk Brandenburg.

Created on 12 October 1991, ORB joined ARD on 27 November and formally took over from the former Rundfunk der DDR on 1 January 1992.

ORB had originally planned to call itself Ostdeutscher Rundfunk (ODR - East German Broadcasting) on the pattern of the already existing Norddeutscher Rundfunk (NDR - North German Broadcasting), Süddeutscher Rundfunk (SDR - South German Broadcasting), and Westdeutscher Rundfunk (WDR - West German Broadcasting). However, faced with the criticism that the designation ODR could be taken as implying that the new organization covered the whole of the former "East Germany", a more specific name was chosen in the autumn of 1991.

ORB television was broadcast from the former studios of the official GDR film company, Deutsche Film AG, whilst the radio services originated in the Funkhaus Nalepastraße, the former headquarters of the GDR's broadcasting service.

In 1995 the Ostdeutscher Rundfunk Brandenburg in coalition with the Sender Freies Berlin started their Internet radio streaming service Info-Radio on Demand.

== Services ==
=== Radio ===
On commencing broadcasting on 1 January 1992, ORB had three radio stations.

- Antenne Brandenburg – begun by the former GDR in May 1990. This became the ORB's pop music and information station.
- Radio Brandenburg – a culture and news station.
- Rockradio B – a youth station, broadcasting on the former frequencies of the GDR's youth station DT64.

On 22 February 1992, ORB and SFB began a joint radio station, Radio B Zwei aimed at 25 to 50-year-old listeners. On 1 March 1993, a further ORB/SFB joint station, Fritz, replaced Rockradio B and was followed by the news-based station Inforadio, which began on 28 August 1995. On 3 October 1997, SFB and ORB launched rbbKultur, a cultural station taking up much of the programming of SFB 3, with an emphasis on classic, world, jazz and new music and politics.

=== Television ===
ORB started broadcasting its own "third" television station on the same day the ARD Das Erste launched in ORB's area (1 January 1992). The third network mostly carried ARD programming for cost reasons. ORB broadcast news programmes at 19:00 and 20:45. However, the main evening news in the GDR had long been at 19:30, and this was the preferred time for most viewers. On 1 May 1992, the schedules were radically altered to account for the habits of the viewers, with the main local news being moved to 19:30 - a position it keeps on RBB's successor service. Additionally, more locally derived programming was added to the schedule.

ORB's television networks were:

==== Joint operations ====
- Das Erste – ARD joint channel
- Phoenix – ARD and ZDF joint events channel
- KI.KA – ARD and ZDF joint children's channel
- Arte – French-German culture channel
- 3sat – ARD, ZDF, ORF, and SRG joint highbrow channel

==== Own network ====
- ORB-Fernsehen – the "third network" for Brandenburg.

== Studios ==
The main studios of ORB were in Potsdam-Babelsberg (near to the Babelsberg Studios). Other studios were located in Cottbus, Frankfurt (Oder) and Perleberg.

== Productions ==
ORB contributed to the series Polizeiruf 110 - a crime drama strand originally produced from 1971 by GDR television and taken up by Das Erste after reunification. ORB also created the popular magazine programme Polylux, which has been continued by RBB and is now shown on Das Erste.
