= RBB Fernsehen =

German television channel by Rundfunk Berlin-Brandenburg

- Country: Germany
- Broadcast area: Berlin and Brandenburg
- Network: ARD
- Headquarters: Berlin, Germany; Potsdam-Babelsberg, Germany

Programming
- Language: German
- Picture format: 720p HDTV (downscaled to 16:9 576i for the SDTV feed)

Ownership
- Owner: Rundfunk Berlin-Brandenburg

History
- Launched: 29 February 2004; 22 years ago
- Replaced: ORB-Fernsehen; SFB1
- Former names: rbb Brandenburg rbb Berlin

Links
- Website: www.rbbfernsehen.de

Availability

Streaming media
- RBB Livestream: Watch Live

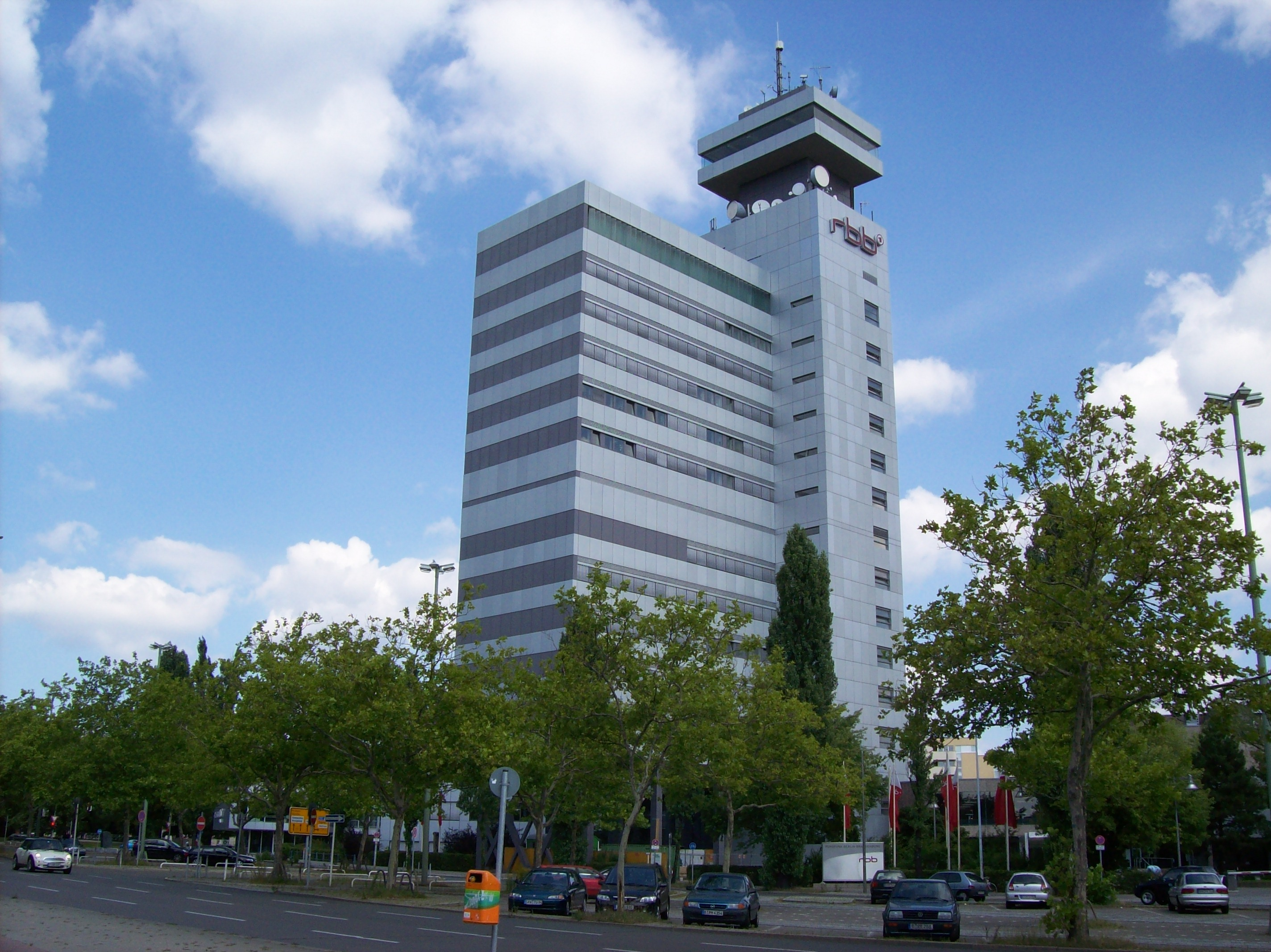
rbb headquarters in Berlin

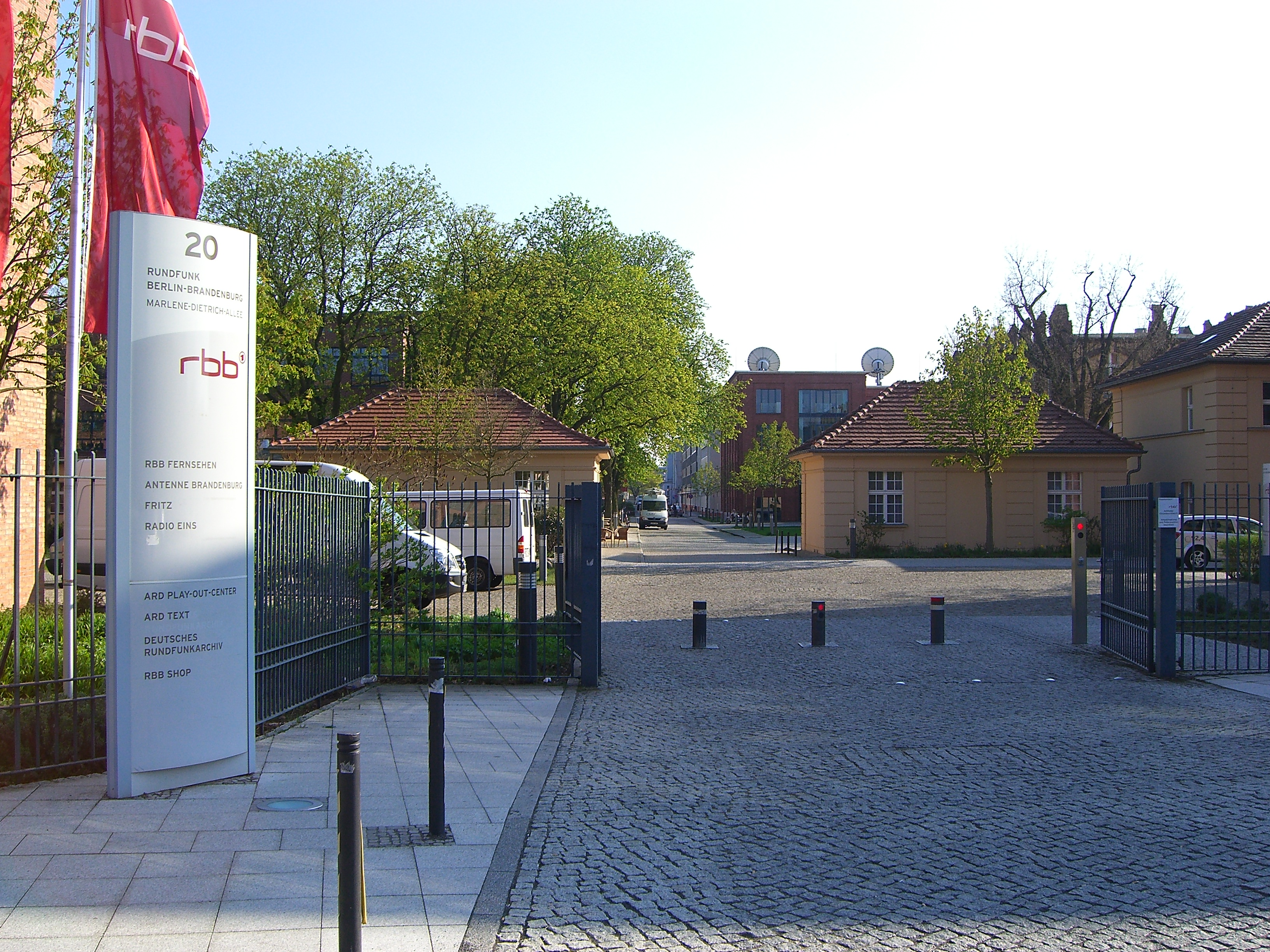
rbb headquarters in Potsdam

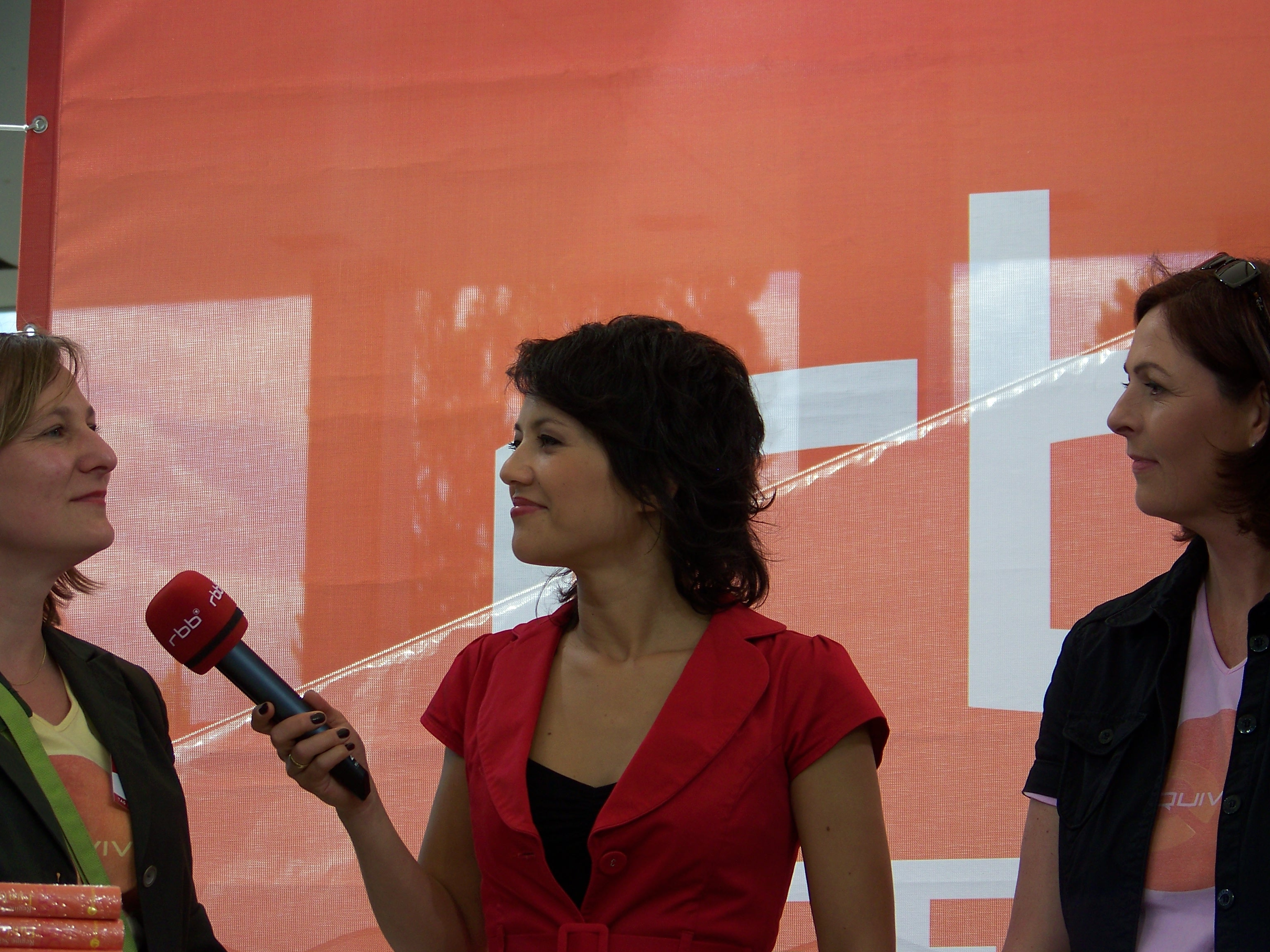
rbb presenter Madeleine Wehle

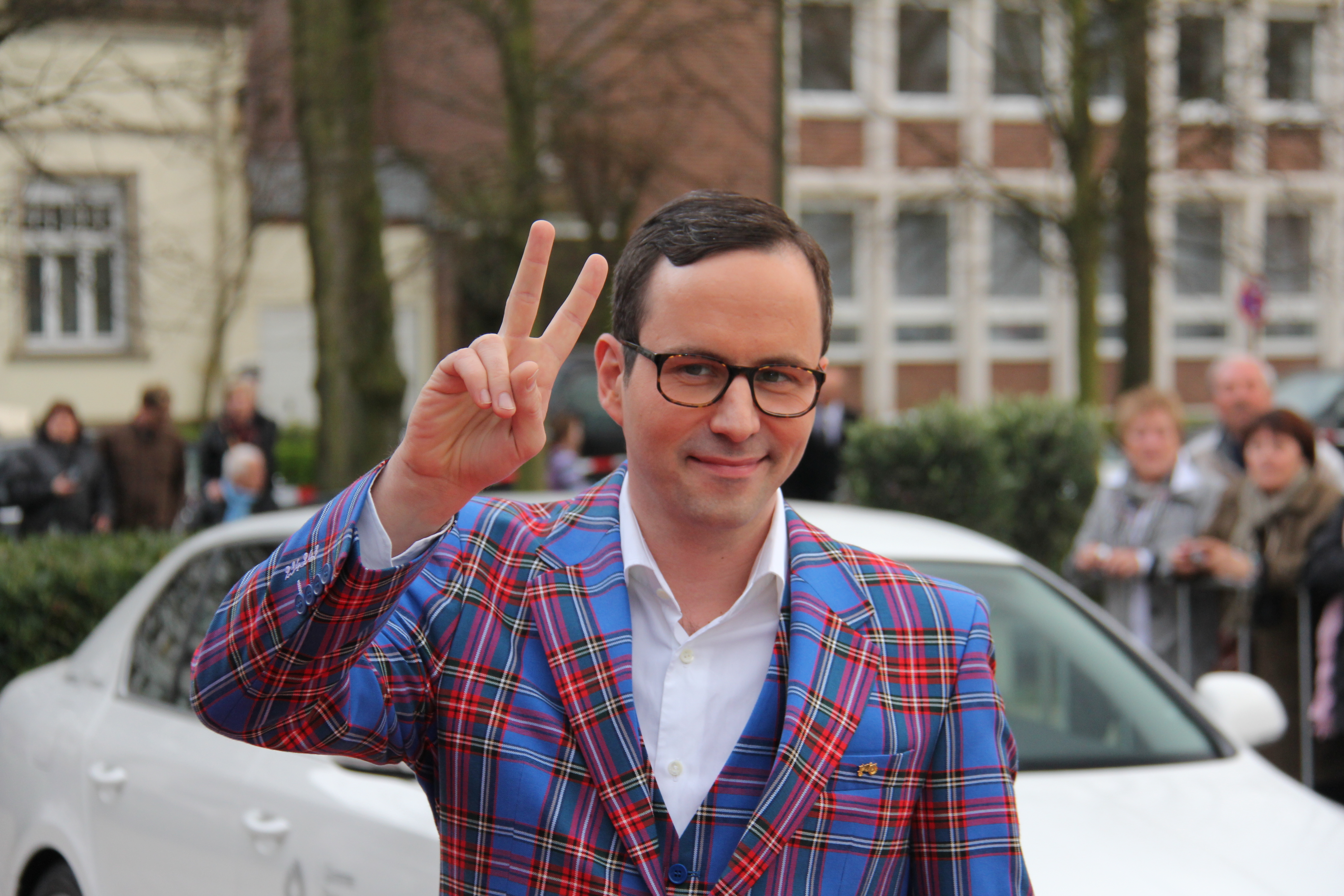
Kurt Krömer

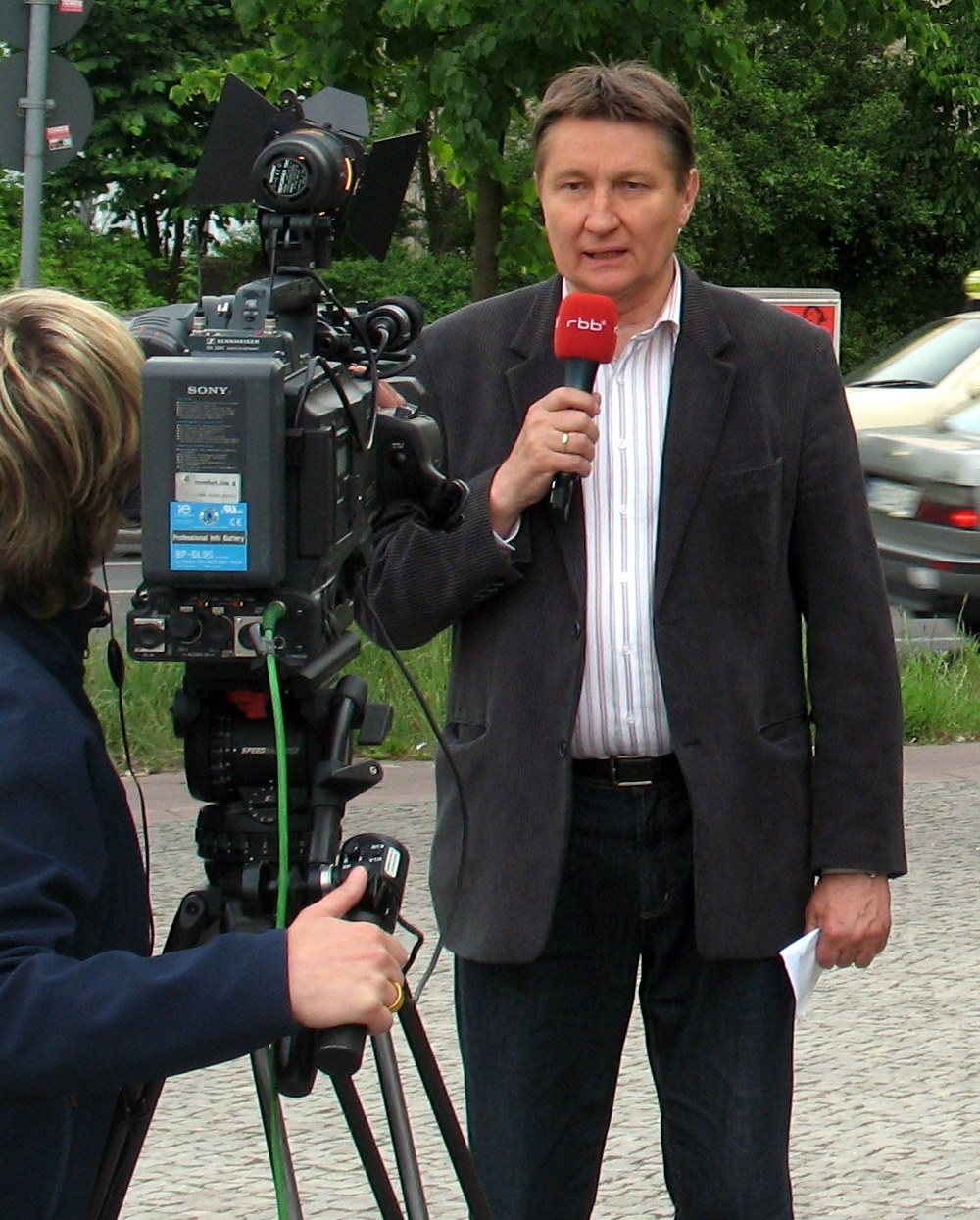
rbb presenter Ulli Zelle

RBB Fernsehen (stylized in lowercase) is a German free-to-air television channel owned and operated by Rundfunk Berlin-Brandenburg (RBB) and serving Berlin and Brandenburg. It is one of the seven regional "third programmes" that are offered within the federal ARD network.

== History ==
On 1 May 2003, ORB-Fernsehen was renamed RBB Brandenburg and SFB1 became RBB Berlin. However, until 28 February 2004, two different programs continued to be broadcast. On 10 November 2003, the joint broadcasts rbb um 6 and zibb – zuhause in Berlin und Brandenburg started. On 29 February 2004 the merger of both stations to rbb Fernsehen took place. In the summer of 2004, the program Im Palais went on the air and from 23 September 2004, Kurt Krömer started his own show. On 23 January 2007, polar bear Knut made his first appearance in a contribution to the Berliner Abendschau, which later triggered a Knut cult. From then on the rbb produced several documentaries about the polar bear for rbb Fernsehen and Das Erste. On 5 September 2009 rbb Fernsehen and Arte broadcast the 24-hour documentary about Berlin in real time 24h Berlin. This was shot exactly one year before by 80 shooting teams in HD quality. Until November 2009, Michael Kessler drove through Berlin with the in October 2006 started Berliner Nacht-Taxe.

At the end of 2009, the rbb announced the cessation of the cinema magazine Filmvorführer and the environmental and science program Ozon which was already aired at Deutscher Fernsehfunk since November 1989. Ozon should be divided into the two formats "Ozon – Die Reportage" and "Ozon – Der Film", which should deal in 30 minutes only with a theme of science and environmental protection. The programs projectionist was set at the end of 2009. After protests against the cessation of Ozon the program has been continued since May 2010 as a monothematic report unter the OZON unterwegs label. Since 10 May 2010, Brandenburg aktuell is broadcast with a new design and a newly designed studio. As of 23 August 2010, a new series with Michael Kessler (Kesslers Expedition) was started.

Since 13 August 2012, rbb Fernsehen broadcast with a new design and the new slogan Das volle Programm ("The full program"). In addition to an expanded regional offer, documentation and entertainment were also broadcast.

On 28 August 2017, design and slogan were changed again. Bloß nicht langweilen ("Do not get bored") replaced Das volle Programm.

== Distribution ==
=== Regional variations ===
There is a separate program window broadcast every day for 30 minutes starting at 7.30 pm where Brandenburg aktuell is broadcast on the Brandenburg transmitters and Berliner Abendschau on the Berlin one's.

=== HDTV ===
rbb Fernsehen started broadcasting in HD quality (720p) via Astra 19.2°E on 5 December 2013.

== Logo history ==
RBB Fernsehen's first, original and previous logo used from 1 March 2004 to 27 August 2017

RBB Fernsehen's old HD logo used from 5 December 2013 to 27 August 2017

RBB Fernsehen's second and current logo since 28 August 2017

RBB Fernsehen's current HD logo since 28 August 2017

== Programming ==
=== Children ===
- Sandmännchen (2004–present)
- Die Sendung mit dem Elefanten (2020–present)

=== Entertainment ===
- Das große Kleinkunstfestival, hosted by Dieter Nuhr (2004–present)
- Die Abendshow (2017–present)

=== Information ===
- Berliner Abendschau (1958–present)
- Brandenburg aktuell (1992–present)
- Łužyca (broadcast in Lower Sorbian language)
- Quivive (2004-2010)
- rbb 24 (2018–present)
- rbb Praxis (2011–present)
- rbb um 6 (2004–present)
- Täter - Opfer - Polizei (2004–present)

=== Sport ===
- Sportplatz (2004–2017)

=== Talk ===
- Dickes B. (2007–2012)
- Thadeusz und die Beobachter, hosted by Jörg Thadeusz (2013–present)
