= MDR Fernsehen =

- Country: Germany
- Broadcast area: Saxony, Saxony-Anhalt and Thuringia
- Network: ARD
- Headquarters: Leipzig, Germany

Programming
- Languages: German, Upper Sorbian
- Picture format: 576i (16:9 SDTV); 720p (HDTV)

Ownership
- Owner: Mitteldeutscher Rundfunk (MDR)

History
- Launched: 1 January 1992; 34 years ago
- Replaced: DFF Länderkette

Links
- Website: www.mdr.de/tv

Availability

Streaming media
- MDR Livestream: Watch Live

MDR Fernsehen is a regional public service television channel owned and operated by Mitteldeutscher Rundfunk (MDR) and serving Saxony, Saxony-Anhalt and Thuringia. It is one of the seven regional "third programmes" that are offered within the federal ARD network.

== Programming ==
The regional news magazines Sachsenspiegel, Sachsen-Anhalt heute and Thüringen Journal are broadcast respectively in Saxony, Saxony-Anhalt and Thuringia at 7 p.m. daily.

Other popular shows include Echt (Really), a science program including new research findings and experiments, and the history series MDR Zeitreise (MDR Time Travel).

== Logos ==
Former logo

Logo, 2003 - 31 December 2016

HD version logo, 2013 - 31 December 2016

On-Air Logo (2013–2016)

HD version On-Air Logo (2013–2016)

Logo since 1 January 2017

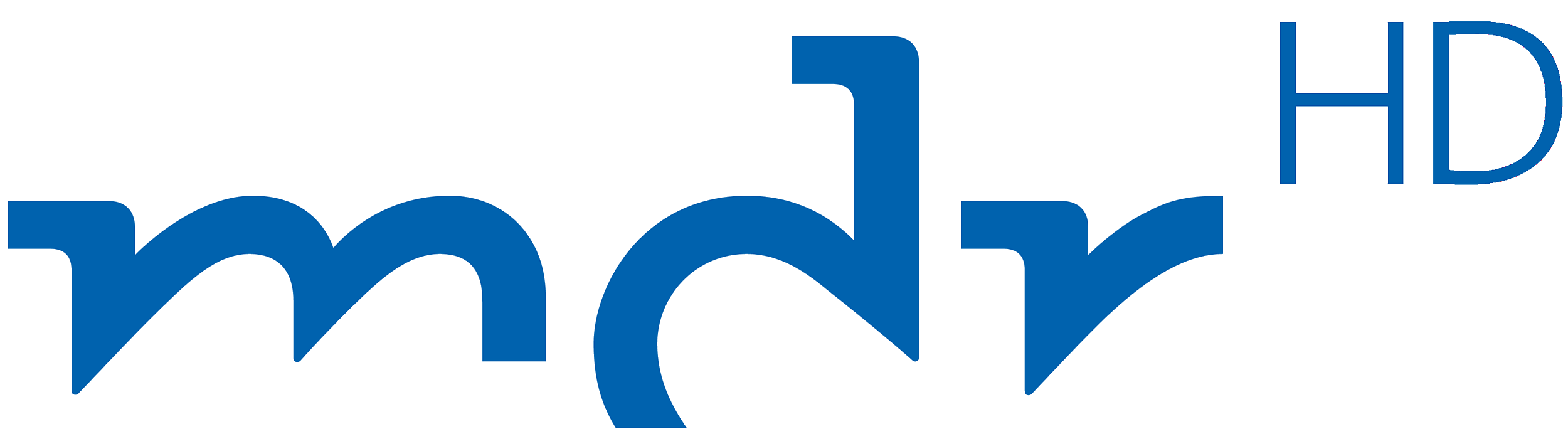
HD version logo since 1 January 2017

Logo in Thuringia since 1 January 2017
