= Rundfunk Berlin-Brandenburg =

German national broadcaster based in Berlin and Potsdam

- Type: Institution under public law
- Country: Germany
- Founded: 1 May 2003; 23 years ago
- Headquarters: Berlin and Potsdam
- Broadcast area: Berlin and Brandenburg
- Key people: Ulrike Demmer
- Affiliation: ARD
- Official website: rbb-online.de
- Replaced: SFB and ORB

Rundfunk Berlin-Brandenburg (pronounced [ˈʁʊntfʊŋk bɛʁˌliːn ˈbʁandn̩bʊʁk]; "Berlin-Brandenburg Broadcasting"), commonly shortened to RBB (pronounced [ˌɛʁbeːˈbeː]; stylized as rbb), is an institution under public law (national broadcaster) for the German states of Berlin and Brandenburg, based in Berlin and Potsdam. RBB was established on 1 May 2003 through the merger of Sender Freies Berlin (SFB) and Ostdeutscher Rundfunk Brandenburg (ORB), based in Potsdam, and is a member of the Association of PSBs in the Federal Republic of Germany (ARD).

Aside from its two main studios in Berlin and Potsdam, RBB also has regional studios in Cottbus and Frankfurt (Oder), and regional offices in Perleberg and Prenzlau. RBB also operates ARD's studio in Warsaw; the responsibility changes every five years between RBB and WDR (Westdeutscher Rundfunk). RBB also plays out ARD's digital channels from a center in Potsdam. RBB and WDR are jointly responsible for ARD's television studio in Berlin.

== History ==
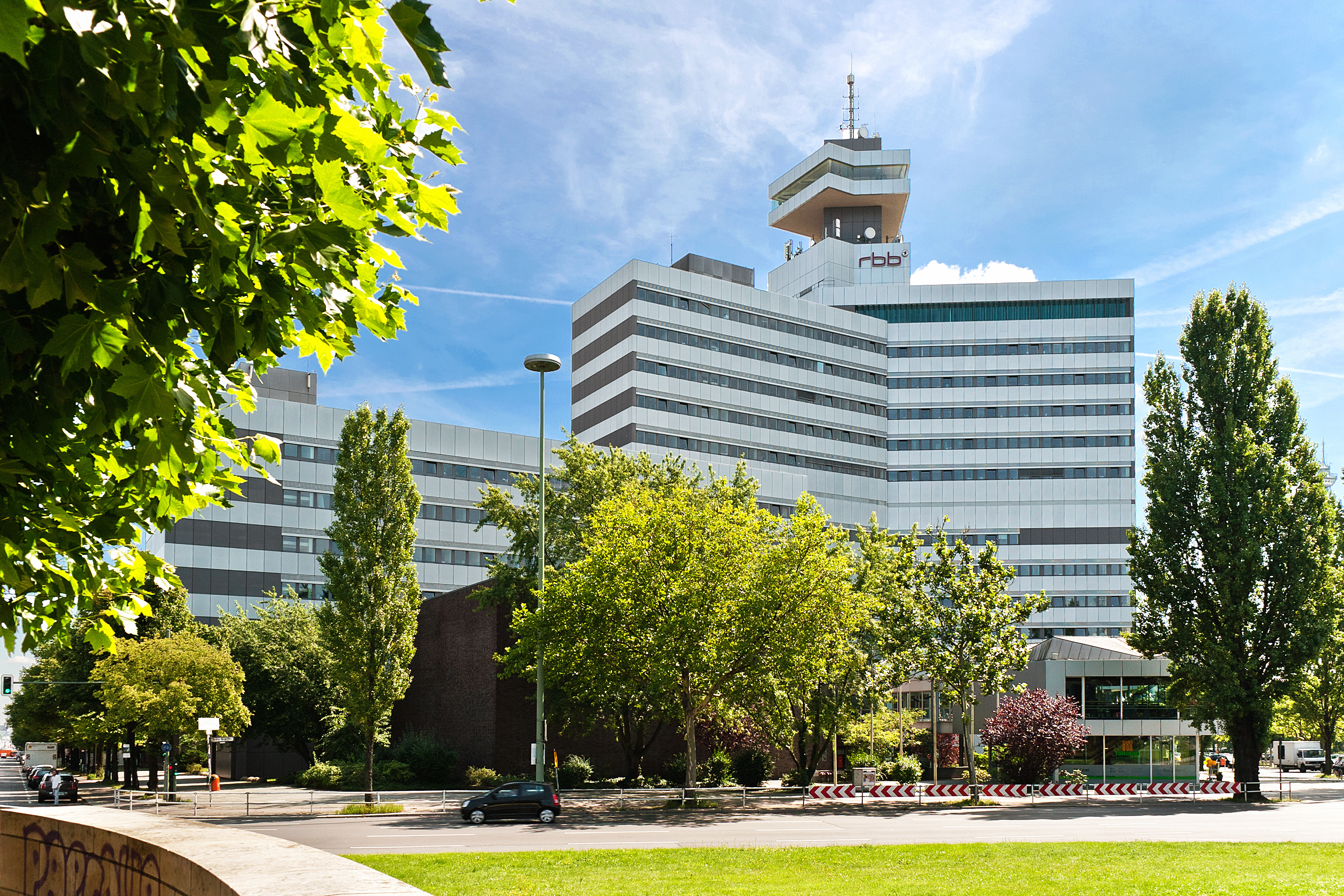
RBB complex at Theodor-Heuss-Platz, Berlin

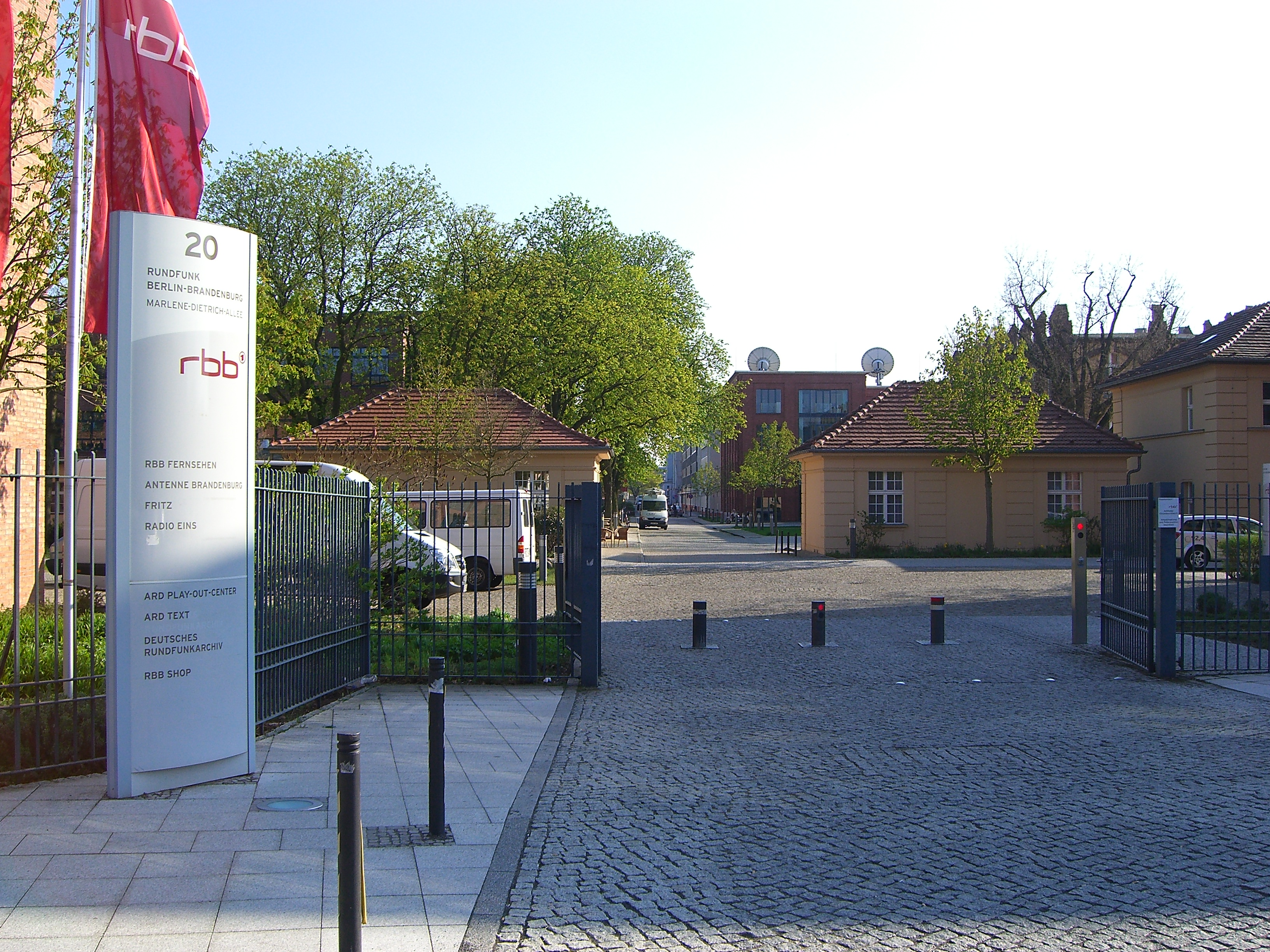
The studio in Potsdam

RBB was founded on 25 June 2002 on the basis of a state treaty between the states of Berlin and Brandenburg. As a result, RBB is required to treat both states equally "with respect to the regional content needs".

In 2022 there were complains about nepotism of rbb-director Patricia Schlesinger. The public prosecutor started an investigation and Schlesinger stepped back from the office as ARD-director and rbb-director.

== Organization and finances ==
=== RBB Directors-general ===
The first director-general of the RBB was Dagmar Reim, from 1 May 2003 to 30 June 2016, at an annual salary of €220,000. Her successor Patricia Schlesinger has been in office since 1 July 2016 and the annual salary has risen to €257,000.

=== Finances ===
Every household in Germany is legally required to pay monthly €18.36 licence fee -the "Rundfunkbeitrag" (broadcast contribution) to finance the public broadcast system. The fee is collected by Beitragsservice von ARD, ZDF und Deutschlandradio. RBB's revenues from the licence fee amounted to

- €376.535 million in 2013
- €430.722 million in 2014
- €413.004 million in 2015
- €401.915 million in 2016

=== Number of employees ===
In 2016 RBB had an average number of 1,938 permanent employees.

== Channels ==
=== Television ===
- RBB Fernsehen – Berlin and Brandenburg's regional public-broadcasting TV channel (successor to SFB 1 and ORB TV channels). Between 19.30 and 20.00, the channel transmits separate regional news programmes for Berlin ("Abendschau") and Brandenburg ("Brandenburg Aktuell")
- Das Erste – Germany's main television network, of which RBB – as a member of ARD – contributes 7% of programming hours
- Phoenix – ARD and ZDF's joint news, events and current-affairs channel
- KiKA – ARD and ZDF's joint children's channel
- arte – European cultural channel
- 3sat – cultural channel from ARD, ZDF, ORF (Austrian Broadcasting), and SRG (Swiss Broadcasting)

=== Radio ===
- rbb 88.8 – radio station for Berlin from Berlin
- Antenne Brandenburg – public station for Brandenburg from Potsdam with regional information from the studios in Potsdam, Cottbus, Frankfurt (Oder), Perleberg and Prenzlau
- Radioeins – radio station for people aged 25 and above
- Fritz – station aimed at 14- to 24-year-olds
- radio3 – cultural channel from Berlin
- rbb24 Inforadio – news channel from Berlin
- Sorbischer Rundfunk – a joint channel with MDR in the Sorbian language
- COSMO – station from WDR for Germans and foreigners, produced in cooperation with Radio Bremen and RBB, (replaced RBB's own station, Radio Multikulti, on 31 December 2008)

== Notable productions ==
RBB produces episodes of the crime series Tatort and Polizeiruf 110 for ARD. It also produces Kontraste, a political show and the satirical show Nuhr im Ersten (formerly Satiregipfel and Scheibenwischer) for ARD. From 2003 to 2005, RBB broadcast the Kurt Krömer Show, which attracted attention nationwide. RBB has produced the show's successor, Bei Krömers, for ARD since 2005.

The regional news show Abendschau has a high profile in the capital region. Since 1958, initially with a slot in ARD including nationwide transmission of the Berlin visit of John F. Kennedy, and later distributed under SFB-frequency, Abendschau reports on politics, economy, sports in Berlin and as well as news from the various districts and boroughs of the city.

RBB produces Ohrenbär, aimed at an audience of four and eight-year-olds.

== Soundcheck Award ==
Radioeins and the Berlin-based national newspaper Tagesspiegel have awarded the Soundcheck Award for "Best Album of the Year" since 2009.
