= Never Ever Let You Go =

2001 single by Rollo & King

Single by Rollo & King
- Language: English
- Released: 1 January 2001
- Length: 2:59
- Label: Mega Records
- Composer(s): Stefan Nielsen; Søren Poppe; Thomas Brekling

Rollo & King singles chronology
"Der står et billede af dig på mit bord" (2001)	"Never Ever Let You Go" (2001)	"Kvinder & mænd som os" (2001)

Alternative cover
- Original cover

Music video
- "Never Ever Let You Go" on YouTube

Eurovision Song Contest 2001 entry
- Country: Denmark
- Language: English

Finals performance
- Final result: 2nd
- Final points: 177

Entry chronology
- ◄ "Fly On The Wings Of Love" (2000)
- "Tell Me Who You Are" (2002) ►

Official performance video
- "Never Ever Let You Go" (Grand Final) on YouTube

"Never Ever Let You Go", originally released as "Der står et billede af dig på mit bord" (Danish: [te̝ ˈstɒˀ e̝t ˈpe̝ləðə æ ˈtɑj pʰɔ mit ˈpoˀɐ̯, - æ tɑ -]; transl. "There is a picture of you on my table"), is a 2001 song by Danish musical duo Rollo & King. The song represented Denmark in the Eurovision Song Contest 2001 after winning Dansk Melodi Grand Prix 2001, Denmark's national final for the contest.

== Background ==
The song is from the perspective of a man who has lost his lover. He pleads with her to return and promises that he will "never ever let you go".

== Production ==
Originally, the band had planned to enter the Dansk Melodi Grand Prix 2001 with a song called "Den eneste ene" (pronounced [tən ˈe̝ːnəstə ˈe̝ːnə]; "The only one"). However, the song was rejected by Mega Records, with the director saying "it's shit". In a week, the band found an unfinished idea called "Der står et billede af dig på mit bord", which the director approved.

== Eurovision Song Contest ==
=== Dansk Melodi Grand Prix 2001 ===
Dansk Melodi Grand Prix 2001 was the selection process used to select the Danish entry for the Eurovision Song Contest 2001. On 4 January 2001, the 10 songs that were scheduled to compete in the contest were revealed.

In polls and rehearsals before the show, "Never Ever Let You Go" was regarded as a favorite to win the contest, with the song, according to Danish newspaper Berlingske, earned the biggest applause from the audience.

The final took place at the Herning Conference Centre in Herning, on 17 February 2001. The winner was selected by the votes of 4 televoting regions (4/5) and an expert jury (1/5) in two rounds. In the first round, the top five entries were selected to proceed to the second round. The song was performed in Danish for the contest. In the second round, the song would win by a wide margin, scoring a near perfect score of 58 points.

=== At Eurovision ===
The song was performed twenty-third (last) on the night, following Greece's Antique with "Die for You". At the close of voting, it had received 177 points (12 points from Croatia, Estonia, Germany, Iceland, Ireland and Norway), placing 2nd in a field of 23.

It was succeeded as Danish representative at the 2002 contest by Malene with "Tell Me Who You Are".

== Critical reception ==
Some members of the Folketing, Denmark's parliament, praised the song. Frank Jensen, who at the time was the Justice Minister of Denmark, said that he expected the song to do well in the contest, saying "they are doing well with the bookmakers, but maybe they will be beaten at the finish line by our hereditary enemies in any competition - namely the Swedes. But let's see now. I think they will do well. And should "We not win this time, so it does not matter so much... As long as we are well placed... and that Denmark makes a great international event."

== Charts ==
Chart (2002)	Peak position
Denmark Singles Chart	3
Dutch Singles Chart	99
Swedish Singles Chart	43
