= Mednis =

Mednis (feminine: Medne): is a Latvian-language surname meaning "capercaillie" or "wood grouse". People with that name include:

- Arnis Mednis (born 1961), Latvian singer
- Edmar Mednis (1937-2002), Latvian-American chess grandmaster and writer
