= United Kingdom in the Eurovision Song Contest 2001 =

- Eurovision Song Contest 2001
- Participating broadcaster: British Broadcasting Corporation (BBC)
- Country: United Kingdom
- Selection process: A Song for Europe 2001
- Selection date: 11 March 2001

Competing entry
- Song: "No Dream Impossible"
- Artist: Lindsay Dracass
- Songwriters: Russ Ballard; Chris Winter

Placement
- Final result: 15th, 28 points

Participation chronology

The United Kingdom was represented at the Eurovision Song Contest 2001 with the song "No Dream Impossible", written by Russ Ballard and Chris Winter, and performed by Lindsay Dracass. The British participating broadcaster, the British Broadcasting Corporation (BBC), organised a public selection process to determine its entry for the contest, A Song for Europe 2001. Eight acts competed in the national final which consisted of a semi-final and a final, during which the winner was selected entirely through a public televote.

In the final of the Eurovision Song Contest, the United Kingdom performed in position 16 and placed 15th out of the 23 participating countries with 28 points.

== Background ==
Prior to the 2001 contest, British Broadcasting Corporation (BBC) had participated in the Eurovision Song Contest representing the United Kingdom forty-three times. Thus far, it has won the contest five times: in 1967 with the song "Puppet on a String" performed by Sandie Shaw, in 1969 with the song "Boom Bang-a-Bang" performed by Lulu, in 1976 with "Save Your Kisses for Me" performed by Brotherhood of Man, in 1981 with the song "Making Your Mind Up" performed by Bucks Fizz, and in 1997 with the song "Love Shine a Light" performed by Katrina and the Waves. To this point, the nation is noted for having finished as the runner-up in a record fifteen contests. Up to and including 1998, it had only twice finished outside the top 10, in 1978 and in 1987. Since 1999, the year in which the rule was abandoned that songs must be performed in one of the official languages of the country participating, the UK has had less success, having yet to finish within the top ten. In 2000, "Don't Play That Song Again" performed by Nicki French finished in sixteenth place out of twenty-four competing entries.

As part of its duties as participating broadcaster, the BBC organises the selection of its entry in the Eurovision Song Contest and broadcasts the event in the country. The broadcaster has traditionally organised a national final featuring a competition among several artists and songs to choose its entry for Eurovision. For 2001, the broadcaster announced that a national final involving a public vote would be held to select its entry.

== Before Eurovision ==
=== A Song for Europe 2001 ===
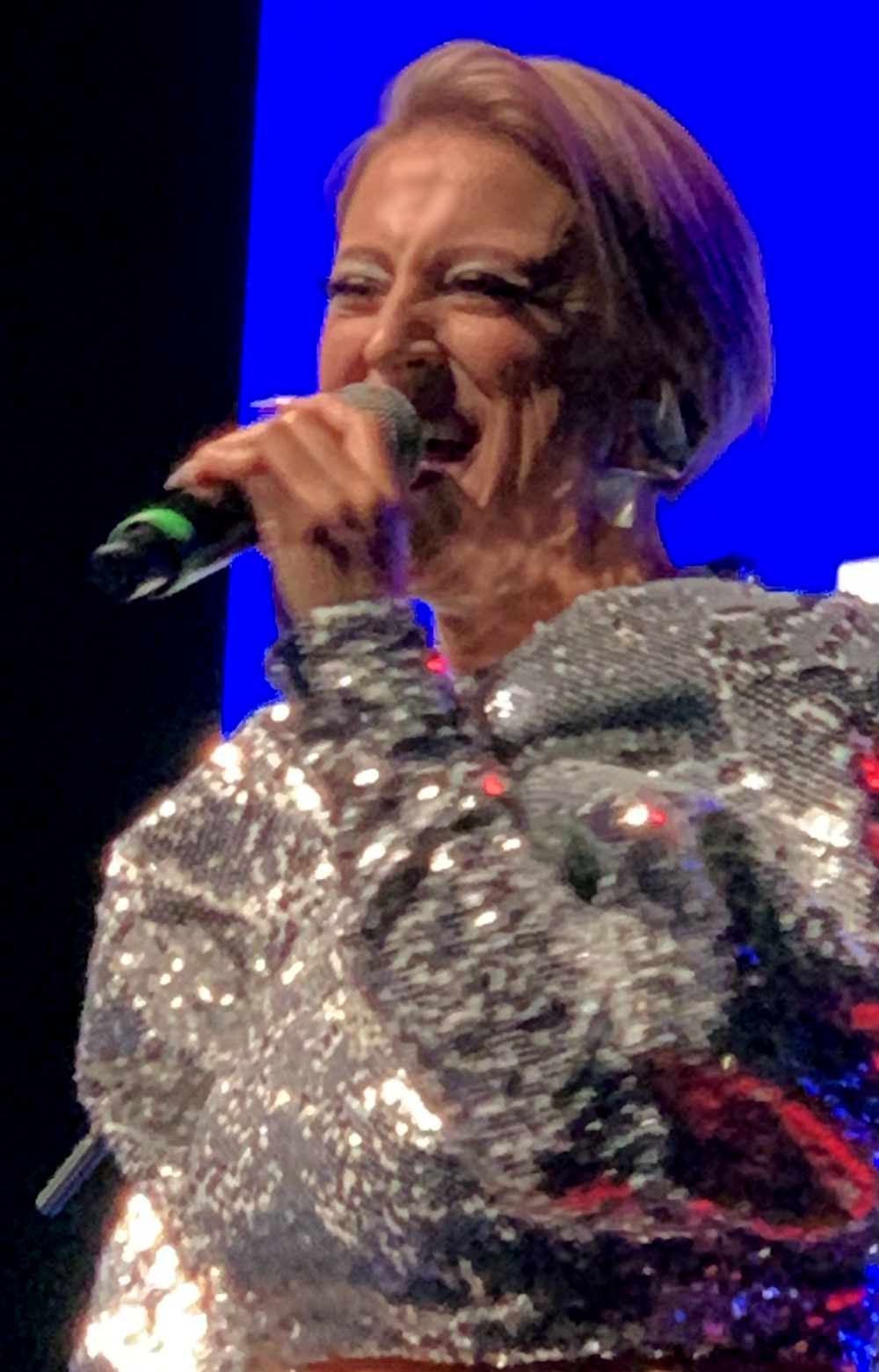
Lindsay Dracass (pictured in 2023) represented the United Kingdom after winning A Song for Europe 2001

A Song for Europe 2001 was the national final developed by the BBC in order to select its entry for the Eurovision Song Contest 2001. Eight acts competed in the competition which consisted of a radio semi-final on 26 January 2001 and a televised final on 11 March 2001. The semi-final was broadcast on BBC Radio 2, while the final was broadcast on BBC One.

==== Competing entries ====
In late 2000, BBC together with the British Academy of Songwriters, Composers and Authors (BASCA) and the Music Publishers Association (MPA) announced an open submission for interested songwriters to submit their songs. All composers and lyricists were required to be British citizens or residents in the United Kingdom for three years prior to the Eurovision Song Contest 2001. A fee was also imposed on songs being submitted to the national final: £47 for BASCA members, £70.5 for non-BASCA members and £11.75 for songwriters under the age of 17 by 1 May 2001. The submission period lasted until 20 October 2000. More than 600 received submissions were reviewed and a 28-song shortlist was compiled and presented to a professional panel consisting of representatives of the BBC, BASCA and MPA that ultimately selected eight semi-finalists to compete in the national final. The eight competing songs were premiered during The Ken Bruce Show and Wake Up to Wogan on BBC Radio 2 between 22 and 25 January 2001.

==== Semi-final ====
Eight acts competed in the radio semi-final which was hosted by Terry Wogan and Ken Bruce during the BBC Radio 2 programme Wake Up to Wogan on 26 January 2001. A public televote selected the top four songs that proceeded to the final.

Semi-final – 26 January 2001
R/O	Artist	Song	Songwriter(s)	Result
1	Lucy Randell	"Just Another Rainbow"	Pete Kirtley; Tim Hawes	Qualified
2	Charlotte Henry	"King of Love"	Max Milligan; Charlotte Henry	—N/a
3	Nanne	"Men"	Kimberley Rew	Qualified
4	Lindsay D	"No Dream Impossible"	Russ Ballard; Chris Winter	Qualified
5	Tony Moore	"That's My Love"	Tony Moore	Qualified
6	Luke Galliana	"To Die For"	Stephen Lipson; Wayne Hector; Deni Lew; Nicky Graham	—N/a
7	Moneypenny	"Twisted"	Dawn Joseph; Sara Eker; Lucy Abbott; Russ Ballard; Chris Ballard; Andy Murray	—N/a
8	Obsession	"Why Should I Love You"	Jodie Wilson; Richard Darbyshire; Frank Musker	—N/a

==== Final ====
Four acts competed in the televised final on 11 March 2001 which was held at the BBC Elstree Centre in Borehamwood, Hertfordshire and hosted by Katy Hill. A public televote selected the winner, "No Dream Impossible" performed by Lindsay D. The televote in the final registered 102,352 votes.

Final – 11 March 2001
R/O	Artist	Song	Televote	Place
1	Lucy Randell	"Just Another Rainbow"	19,337	3
2	Nanne	"Men"	5,556	4
3	Lindsay D	"No Dream Impossible"	45,564	1
4	Tony Moore	"That's My Love"	31,895	2

== At Eurovision ==
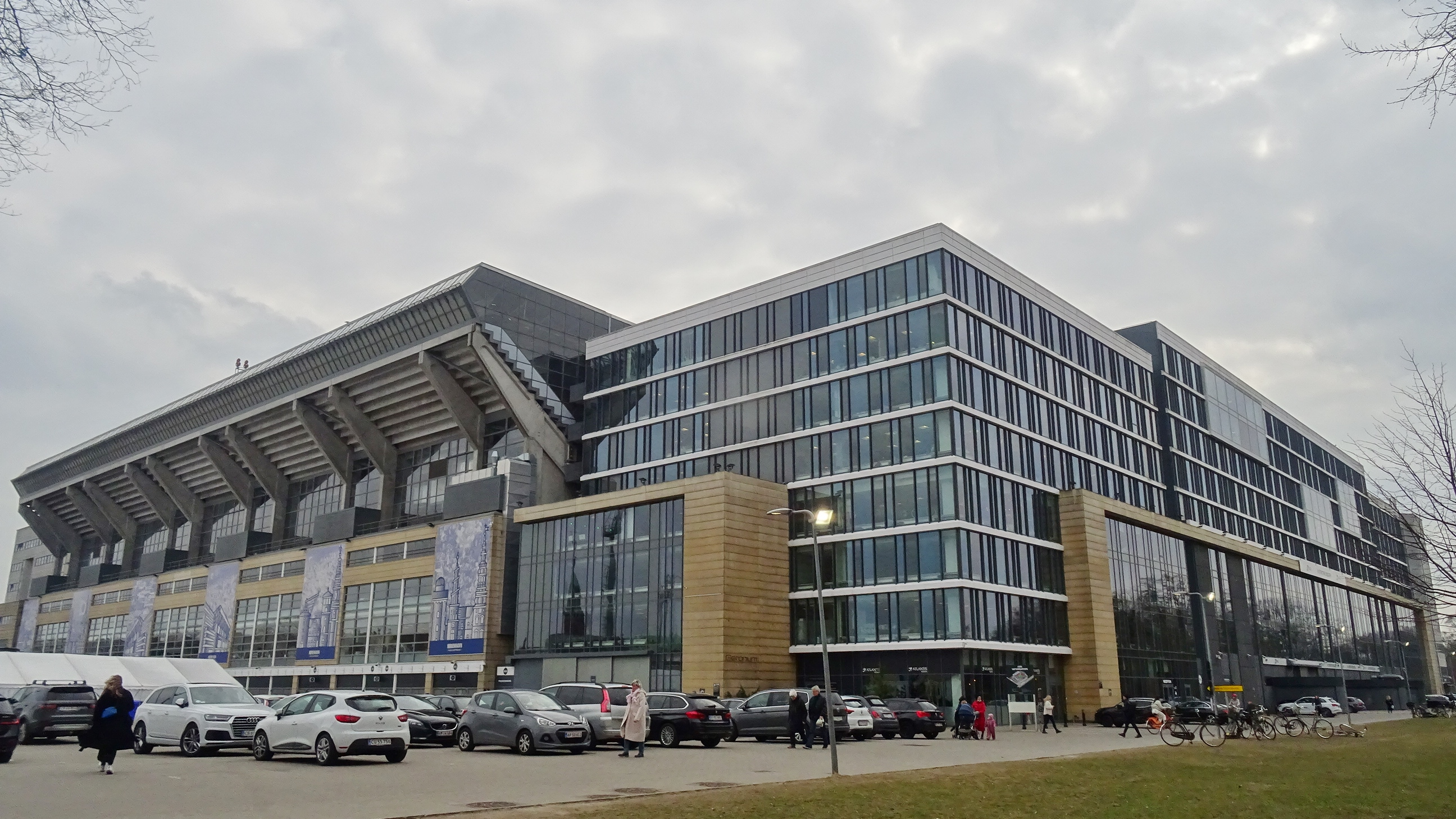
The Eurovision Song Contest 2001 took place at Parken Stadium in Copenhagen, Denmark.

The Eurovision Song Contest 2001 took place at Parken Stadium in Copenhagen, Denmark, on 12 May 2001. The relegation rules introduced for the 1997 contest were again utilised ahead of the 2001 contest, based on each country's average points total in previous contests. The 23 participants were made up of the host country, the "Big Four" countries (France, Germany, Spain and the United Kingdom), and the 12 countries with the highest average scores between the 1996 and 2000 contests competed in the final. As a member of the "Big Four", the United Kingdom automatically qualified to compete in the contest. On 21 November 2000, an allocation draw was held which determined the running order and the United Kingdom was set to perform in position 16, following the entry from Turkey and before the entry from Slovenia. The United Kingdom finished in eighteenth place scoring 28 points.

The contest was broadcast on BBC One (with commentary by Terry Wogan) and on radio station BBC Radio 2 (with commentary by Ken Bruce).

=== Voting ===
Below is a breakdown of points awarded to the United Kingdom and awarded by the United Kingdom in the contest. The nation awarded its 12 points to Estonia in the contest.

The BBC appointed Colin Berry as its spokesperson to announce the results of the British televote during the show.

Points awarded to the United Kingdom
Score	Country
12 points	
10 points	
8 points	
7 points	
6 points	
5 points	
4 points	Ireland
3 points	Croatia; Latvia; Lithuania; Malta; Russia
2 points	Germany; Netherlands; Poland; Portugal
1 point	Spain

Points awarded by the United Kingdom
Score	Country
12 points	Estonia
10 points	Denmark
8 points	Sweden
7 points	Greece
6 points	France
5 points	Ireland
4 points	Lithuania
3 points	Spain
2 points	Germany
1 point	Malta
