= Slovenia in the Eurovision Song Contest 2001 =

- Eurovision Song Contest 2001
- Participating broadcaster: Radiotelevizija Slovenija (RTVSLO)
- Country: Slovenia
- Selection process: Evrovizijska Melodija 2001
- Selection date: 24 February 2001

Competing entry
- Song: "Energy"
- Artist: Nuša Derenda
- Songwriters: Matjaž Vlašič; Lucienne Lončina

Placement
- Final result: 7th, 70 points

Participation chronology

Slovenia was represented at the Eurovision Song Contest 2001 with the song "Energy", composed by Matjaž Vlašič, with lyrics by Lucienne Lončina, and performed by Nuša Derenda. The Slovene participating broadcaster, Radiotelevizija Slovenija (RTVSLO), held the national final Evrovizijska Melodija 2001 in order to select its entry for the contest. The broadcaster returned to the contest after a one-year absence following its relegation in 2000 as one of the six entrants with the lowest average scores over the previous five contests.

22 entries competed in the national final which consisted of two shows: a semi-final and a final. Entries were selected to advance from the semi-final based on a public televote and a jury panel. Ten entries qualified to compete in the final where "Ne, ni res" performed by Nuša Derenda was selected as the winner following the combination of votes from two thematical juries and a public televote. The song was later translated from Slovene to English for Eurovision and was titled "Energy".

Slovenia competed in the Eurovision Song Contest which took place on 12 May 2001. Performing during the show in position 17, Slovenia placed seventh out of the 23 participating countries, scoring 70 points.

== Background ==
Prior to the 2001 contest, Radiotelevizija Slovenija (RTVSLO) had participated in the Eurovision Song Contest representing Slovenia six times since its first entry in 1993. Its highest placing in the contest, to this point, has been seventh place, achieved in in 1995 with the song "Prisluhni mi" performed by Darja Švajger. Its only other top ten result was achieved in 1997 when "Zbudi" performed by Tanja Ribič placed tenth. In 1999, "For a Thousand Years" performed by Švajger placed eleventh.

As part of its duties as participating broadcaster, RTVSLO organises the selection of its entry in the Eurovision Song Contest and broadcasts the event in the country. The broadcaster has traditionally selected its entry through a national final entitled Evrovizijska Melodija (EMA), which has been produced with variable formats. For 2001, RTVSLO opted to organise Evrovizijska Melodija 2001 (EMA 2001) to select its entry.

== Before Eurovision ==
=== Evrovizijska Melodija 2001 ===
Evrovizijska Melodija 2001 (EMA 2001) was the sixth edition of the national final format Evrovizijska Melodija (EMA). The competition was used by RTVSLO to select its entry for the Eurovision Song Contest 2001, and consisted of two shows on 23 and 24 February 2001. Both shows of the competition took place at the RTVSLO Studio 1 in Ljubljana and were broadcast on TV SLO1.

==== Format ====
The format of the competition consisted of two televised shows: a semi-final held on 23 February 2001 and a final held on 24 February 2001. Twenty-two songs competed in the semi-final where a public televote first selected the top six entries to proceed to the final. An expert jury then selected an additional six finalists out of the thirteen remaining songs. Ten songs competed in the final where the winner was selected following the combination of points from two thematical juries and a public televote. The jury groups and the televote each assigned points as follows: 1–8, 10 and 12, with the song that received the highest overall score when the votes were combined being determined the winner.

==== Competing entries ====
An expert committee consisting of Mojca Menart (music editor for Radio Slovenija), Mojmir Sepe (conductor and composer), Jaka Pucihar (composer) and Aleš Strajnar (musician and composer) selected twenty-two artists and songs for the competition from 98 received submissions. The competing artists were announced on 18 December 2000. Among the competing artists was former Eurovision contestants 1X Orchestra which represented Slovenia in 1993 as 1X Band, and Regina who represented Slovenia in 1996.

Artist	Song	Songwriter(s)
1X Orchestra	"Ta ni zame"	Tomaž Kosec, Cole Moretti
Alenka Godec	"Če verjameš ali ne"	Anja Rupel, Alenka Godec, Aleš Klinar
Andraž Hribar	"Življenje je"	Dušan Bižal, Andraž Hribar
By the Way	"Svet okoli mene"	Aleksandra Konstantin, Simon Baraga
Damjana Golavšek	"Stoletje sanj in miru"	Svezdana Majhen, Karel Novak
Deja Mušič and Katice	"Angel luči"	Nenad Kokovič
GIS	"Sreča je"	Jamez Hostnik
Ivo Špacapan	"Za devetimi gorami"	Ivo Špacapan
Jan Plestenjak	"Vse je OK"	Jan Plestenjak
Karmen Stavec	"Ostani tu"	Martin Štibernik, Karmen Stavec
Kingston	"Lunapark"	Dare Kaurič, Zvone Tomac
Lutke	"Pokliči me"	Dadi Dacič
Nude	"Ni čist greh"	Boštjan Dermol, Gaber Marolt
Number One	"Tell Me Why"	Franko Reja, Branko Kumar, Roland Makovec
Nuša Derenda	"Ne, ni res"	Urša Vlašić, Matjaž Vlašić
Panda	"Tok, tok"	Andrej Pompe
PAX	"Ko so lipe cvetele"	Vlado Poredoš
Polona	"Samo laži"	Drago Mislej Mef, Danolo Kocjančič
Regina	"Zaljubljena v maj"	Marko Slokar, Aleksander Kogoj
Simona Weiss	"Vse življenje"	Simona Weiss, Goran Šarac, Andrej Baša
So Real	"Nedeljsko jutro"	Peter Azaman, Mario Barišič
Tinkara Kovač	"Sonce v očeh"	Zvezdan Martič, Tinkara Kovač, Sergej Pobegajlo

==== Semi-final ====
The semi-final of EMA 2001 took place on 23 February 2001 and was hosted by Mojca Mavec. The twenty-two competing entries first faced a public televote where the top six proceeded to the final; an additional six qualifiers were then selected out of the remaining sixteen entries by an expert jury.

Public vote qualifier Jury qualifier

Semi-final – 23 February 2001
R/O	Artist	Song	Televote	Place	Result
1	Panda	"Tok, tok"	1,051	15	—N/a
2	PAX	"Ko so lipe cvetele"	3,849	4	Qualified
3	Tinkara Kovač	"Sonce v očeh"	3,580	5	Qualified
4	Nuša Derenda	"Ne, ni res"	6,416	1	Qualified
5	Jan Plestenjak	"Vse je OK"	2,026	10	—N/a
6	Simona Weiss	"Vse življenje"	2,819	7	—N/a
7	GIS	"Sreča je"	1,000	17	—N/a
8	Damjana Golavšek	"Stoletje sanj in miru"	1,897	11	—N/a
9	By the Way	"Svet okoli mene"	1,022	16	Qualified
10	Deja Mušič and Katice	"Angel luči"	1,534	13	—N/a
11	Polona	"Samo laži"	999	18	Qualified
12	Lutke	"Pokliči me"	446	21	—N/a
13	Ivo Špacapan	"Za devetimi gorami"	615	20	Qualified
14	Regina	"Zaljubljena v maj"	1,654	12	Qualified
15	Nude	"Ni čist greh"	2,288	9	Qualified
16	Kingston	"Lunapark"	4,441	3	Qualified
17	So Real	"Nedeljsko jutro"	444	22	—N/a
18	Number One	"Tell Me Why"	1,161	14	—N/a
19	Alenka Godec	"Če verjameš ali ne"	2,465	8	Qualified
20	Andraž Hribar	"Življenje je"	2,857	6	Qualified
21	1X Orchestra	"Ta ni zame"	766	19	—N/a
22	Karmen Stavec	"Ostani tu"	5,096	2	Qualified

==== Final ====
The final of EMA 2001 took place on 24 February 2001 and was hosted by Mojca Mavec, Miša Molk and Marcel Štefančič. In addition to the performances of the competing entries, Jette Ostan Vejrup, Trine Jepsen and Michael Teschl (who represented Denmark in 1999) and Stefan Raab (who represented Germany in 2000) performed as guests. The combination of points from two thematical juries (2/3) and a public televote (1/3) selected "Ne, ni res" performed Nuša Derenda as the winner. The juries consisted of experts and representatives of the entertainment programme of RTVSLO.

Final – 24 February 2001
R/O	Artist	Song	Jury		Televote		Total	Place
R/O	Artist	Song	Expert	RTVSLO	Votes	Points	Total	Place
1	PAX	"Ko so lipe cvetele"	1	1	5,788	7	9	7
2	Tinkara Kovač	"Sonce v očeh"	6	7	4,617	5	18	5
3	Nuša Derenda	"Ne, ni res"	12	12	8,769	10	34	1
4	By the Way	"Svet okoli mene"	2	2	1,512	1	5	12
5	Polona	"Samo laži"	7	6	1,073	0	13	6
6	Ivo Špacapan	"Za devetimi gorami"	4	5	787	0	9	7
7	Regina	"Zaljubljena v maj"	0	4	1,786	2	6	10
8	Nude	"Ni čist greh"	3	0	2,399	3	6	10
9	Kingston	"Lunapark"	0	0	5,955	8	8	9
10	Alenka Godec	"Če verjameš ali ne"	8	8	3,302	4	20	3
11	Andraž Hribar	"Življenje je"	10	10	4,856	6	26	2
12	Karmen Stavec	"Ostani tu"	5	3	10,088	12	20	3

Jury members
Jury	Members
Experts	Mojca Menart; Mojmir Sepe; Jaka Pucihar; Aleš Strajnar
RTVSLO	Mira Bučar; Dajana Makovec; Anton Natek; Andrej Hofer

== At Eurovision ==
The Eurovision Song Contest 2001 took place at Parken Stadium in Copenhagen, Denmark, on 12 May 2001. The relegation rules introduced for the 1997 contest were again utilised ahead of the 2001 contest, based on each country's average points total in previous contests. The 23 participants were made up of the host country, the "Big Four" (France, Germany, Spain, and the United Kingdom), and the 12 countries with the highest average scores between the 1996 and 2000 contests competed in the final. On 21 November 2000, an allocation draw was held which determined the running order and Slovenia was set to perform in position 17, following the entry from the United Kingdom and before the entry from Poland. At the contest, Nuša Derenda performed the English version of "Ne, ni res", titled "Energy".

Slovenia finished in seventh place with 70 points. This remains, alongside its 1995 entry, the country's best result in the contest. Slovenia has not made it to the top 10 of the contest since.

The contest was broadcast on SLO 1.

=== Voting ===
Below is a breakdown of points awarded to Slovenia and awarded by Slovenia in the contest. The nation awarded its 12 points to Estonia in the contest.

RTVSLO appointed Mojca Mavec as its spokesperson to announce the Slovenian votes during the show.

Points awarded to Slovenia
Score	Country
12 points	
10 points	Bosnia and Herzegovina
8 points	Croatia
7 points	Sweden
6 points	Iceland; Norway; Poland
5 points	Estonia
4 points	Germany; Lithuania; Netherlands; Russia
3 points	
2 points	Ireland; Spain
1 point	France; Israel

Points awarded by Slovenia
Score	Country
12 points	Estonia
10 points	Denmark
8 points	Greece
7 points	Bosnia and Herzegovina
6 points	France
5 points	Croatia
4 points	Netherlands
3 points	Poland
2 points	Lithuania
1 point	Spain
