= Russia in the Eurovision Song Contest 2001 =

- Eurovision Song Contest 2001
- Country: Russia
- Selection process: Internal selection
- Announcement date: Artist: 4 April 2001; Song: 13 April 2001

Competing entry
- Song: "Lady Alpine Blue"
- Artist: Mumiy Troll
- Songwriter: Ilya Lagutenko

Placement
- Final result: 12th, 37 points

Participation chronology

Russia was represented at the Eurovision Song Contest 2001 with the song "Lady Alpine Blue", written by Ilya Lagutenko and performed by Mumiy Troll. The Russian entry was selected internally by the Russian broadcaster Russian Public Television (ORT). At the contest, Russia placed 12th and scored 37 points.

== Background ==
Prior to the 2001 contest, Russia had participated in the Eurovision Song Contest 4 times since its first entry in 1994. Russia missed the 1996 contest when its selected song "Ya eto ya" by Andrey Kosinsky failed to qualify for the contest, due to the fact that entry scored an insufficient number of points in a special qualifying round, 1998 contest due to a poor average score from the preceding contests, which ultimately led to relegation and 1999 contest due to the fact that Russian broadcaster ORT didn't air 1998 contest on television, which was a requirement for participation in 1999. To this point, the country's best placing was second, which it achieved in 2000 with the song "Solo" performed by Alsou. Russia's least successful result was in 1995 when it placed 17th with the song "Kolybelnaya dlya vulkana" by Philipp Kirkorov, receiving 17 points in total.

The Russian national broadcaster, Russian Public Television (ORT), broadcasts the event within Russia and organises the selection process for the nation's entry. Russia has used various methods to select the Russian entry in the past, such as internal selections and televised national finals to choose the performer and song to compete at Eurovision. Since 1997, the broadcaster has opted to internally select both the artist and song that would represent Russia, a procedure that continued for the selection of the 2001 entry.

== Before Eurovision ==
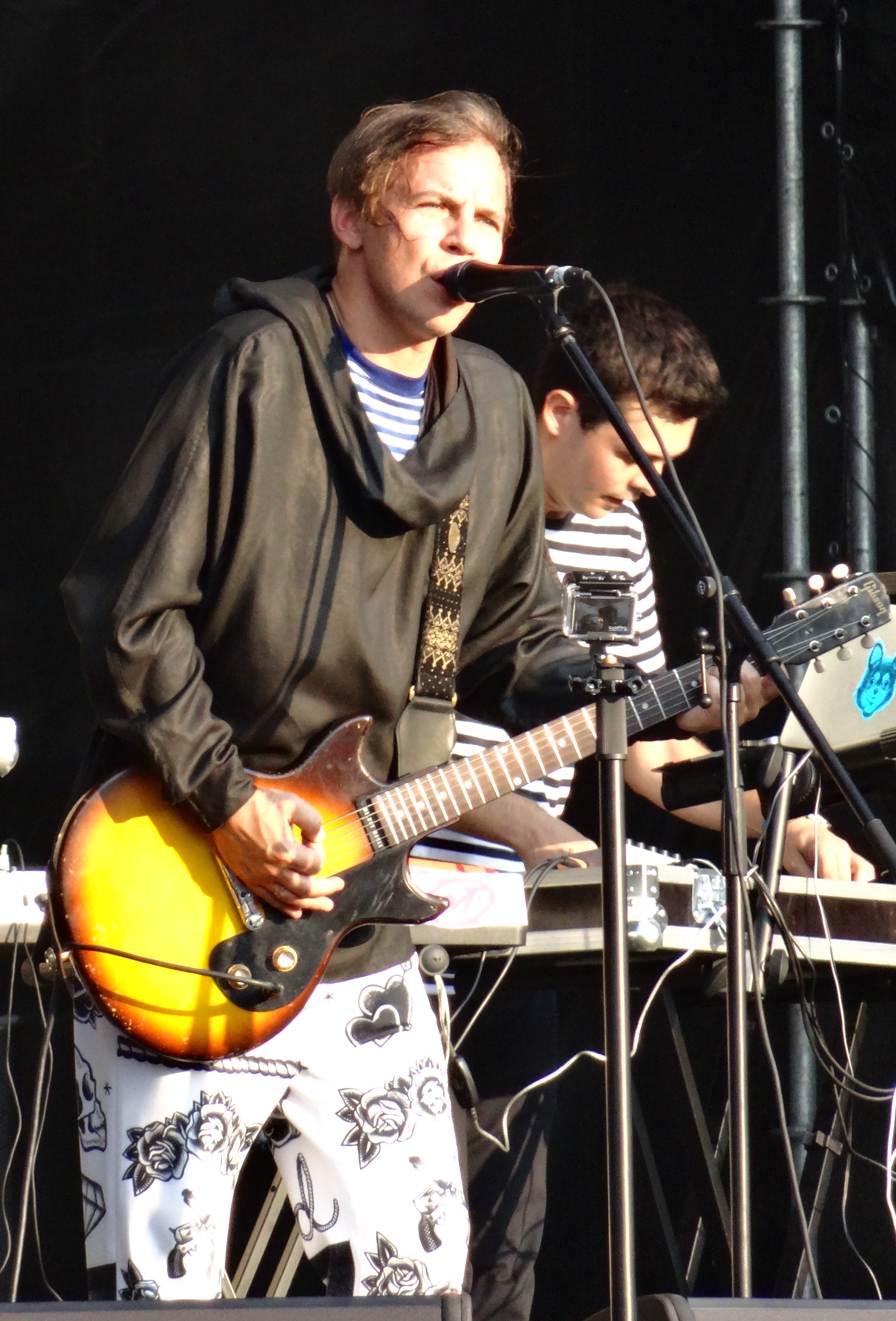
"Lady Alpine Blue" was written and composed by Mumiy Troll's lead singer Ilya Lagutenko

=== Internal selection ===
Prior to the contest, ORT opened a submission period for interested artists and composers to submit their entries until 15 February 2001. At the conclusion of the deadline, the broadcaster received over 2000 submissions, including entries from Vitas, Plazma and Gosti iz budushego.

On 30 March 2001, Russian newspaper Vremya Novostei claimed that the band Mumiy Troll had been selected as the Russian entrant at the 2001 contest with the song "Lady Alpine Blue", which was later confirmed by ORT on 4 April. Mumiy Troll's selection as the Russian representative was decided upon by a jury panel from 5 shortlisted acts. "Lady Alpine Blue" was composed by band's lead singer Ilya Lagutenko and was presented to the public on 13 April 2001 through the release of the official music video, directed by Andrey Kuznetsov.

=== Promotion ===
In order to promote "Lady Alpine Blue" as the Russian Eurovision entry, a music video for the song, as well as maxi-single, featuring an additional mixes of the song, was released.

== At Eurovision ==
Russia performed 6th at the 2001 Contest, following Israel and preceding Sweden. After the voting concluded, Russia scored 37 points and placed 12th.

The contest was broadcast on ORT and on delay on the Orbita satellite broadcasting system in the Russian Far East, both with commentary by Alexander Anatolyevich and Konstantin Mikhailov. The voting spokesperson for Russia was Larisa Verbitskaya.

The following members comprised the Russian jury:

- Igor Matvienko - jury chairperson
- Maria Shukshina
- Nikolay Tsitskaridze
- Margarita Mitrofanova
- DJ Groof
- Yulia Barsukova
- Yana Churikova
- Valdis Pelšs

=== Voting ===
Points awarded to Russia
Score	Country
12 points	
10 points	Lithuania
8 points	Latvia
7 points	
6 points	
5 points	Greece; Iceland
4 points	Estonia
3 points	Israel
2 points	Malta
1 point	

Points awarded by Russia
Score	Country
12 points	France
10 points	Lithuania
8 points	Germany
7 points	Malta
6 points	Estonia
5 points	Greece
4 points	Slovenia
3 points	United Kingdom
2 points	Sweden
1 point	Netherlands
