= Spain in the Eurovision Song Contest 2001 =

- Eurovision Song Contest 2001
- Participating broadcaster: Televisión Española (TVE)
- Country: Spain
- Selection process: Eurocanción 2001
- Selection date: 23 February 2001

Competing entry
- Song: "Dile que la quiero"
- Artist: David Civera
- Songwriter: Alejandro Abad

Placement
- Final result: 6th, 76 points

Participation chronology

Spain was represented at the Eurovision Song Contest 2001 with the song "Dile que la quiero" written by Alejandro Abad and performed by David Civera. The Spanish participating broadcaster, Televisión Española (TVE), organised the national final Eurocanción 2001 in order to select its entry for the contest. Twenty artists and songs competed in the televised show where an in-studio jury and a public televote selected "Dile que la quiero" performed by David Civera as the winner. Songwriter Alejandro Abad represented Spain in 1994.

As a member of the "Big Four", Spain automatically qualified to compete in the Eurovision Song Contest. Performing in position 13, it placed sixth out of the 23 participating countries with 76 points.

== Background ==
Prior to the 2001 contest, Televisión Española (TVE) had participated in the Eurovision Song Contest representing Spain forty times since its first entry in 1961. It has won the contest on two occasions: in 1968 with the song "La, la, la" performed by Massiel and in 1969 with the song "Vivo cantando" performed by Salomé, the latter having won in a four-way tie with France, the Netherlands, and the United Kingdom. It has also finished second four times, with "En un mundo nuevo" by Karina in 1971, "Eres tú" by Mocedades in 1973, "Su canción" by Betty Missiego in 1979, and "Vuelve conmigo" by Anabel Conde in 1995. In 2000, "Colgado de un sueño" performed by Serafín Zubiri placed eighteenth.

As part of its duties as participating broadcaster, TVE organises the selection of its entry in the Eurovision Song Contest and broadcasts the event in the country. TVE organised in 2000 the national final Eurocanción which featured a competition among several artists and songs, a procedure which was continued for its 2001 entry.

== Before Eurovision ==
=== Eurocanción 2001 ===
Eurocanción 2001 was the national final organised by TVE that took place on 23 February 2001 at the Estudios Buñuel in Madrid, hosted by Jennifer Rope and Sandra Morey. The show was broadcast live on La Primera and TVE Internacional. Twenty artists and songs competed with the winner being decided upon through the combination of the votes of an in-studio jury (75%) and a public televote (25%).

==== Competing entries ====
TVE directly invited over 30,000 composers to submit songs and 2,160 entries were ultimately received. A fifteen-member committee, which included the creator and director of Eurocanción José Luis Uribarri, evaluated the entries received and shortlisted thirty for an audition round where twenty entries were selected for the national final. The twenty competing acts were announced during a press conference on 22 February 2001.

Artist	Song	Songwriter(s)
David Castedo	"Un terrón de azúcar"	David Castedo
David Civera	"Dile que la quiero"	Alejandro Abad
Frank Bravo	"No sé por qué"	Jose Manuel Moles
Herbert	"Abre los brazos"	G. Carrillo
Hi Priority	"A nadie como a ti"	Pablo Pinilla; David Santisteban
Kingdom Brothers	"Nada es igual"	Adriel Hernández; David Santana; Luis Suárez; Yeron Torres
Locomía	"Música, música"	Alejandro García Price
Luna	"No pidas más amor"	Mercedes Trujillo
Mina	"Libres"	José María Díez; Angel Santiago Haro
Mister Robinson	"Un flechazo de Cupido"	Daniel Grostz; Rafael Esparza
Natalia	"Porque quiero"	Natalia Gómez Lantero
Noemí	"Sin rencor"	Susan Adkinson; Alfonso Sanz
Oxígeno	"Niña bonita"	David Villar; Daniel Cardenete
Paula	"Prisionera de tu amor"	Jose Antonio Ogara
Román	"Nada sin ti"	Douglas Bastidas; Raúl Velez
Silvana	"Dónde"	Enrique Casellas; José Carlos Seco
Sonia and Selena	"Quiero bailar"	Francisco Ten; Tony Ten
Toni and Miguel	"Baila"	Benjamín Estació
Trans X	"Amándonos"	Javier Morán; Octavio Narbón; Cristóbal Garrido; Pascual Anguirad
Virginia	"No tengas miedo de amar"	José Luciano Garrigó; Emilio Alquézar

==== Final ====
The televised final took place on 23 February 2001. In addition to the performances of the competing entries, guest performers included former Eurovision contestants Edyta Górniak who represented Poland in 1994, Dana International who won for Israel in 1998, and Charlotte Nilsson who won for Sweden in 1999. Former Spanish Eurovision representatives Conchita Bautista (1961 and 1965), Salomé (1969), Karina (1971), Micky (1977), José Vélez (1978), Betty Missiego (1979), Lucía (1982), Eva Santamaría (1993), Alejandro Abad (1994), Anabel Conde (1995), and Mikel Herzog (1998) also performed during the show and presented some of the competing entries.

The nine members of the in-studio jury that evaluated the entries were Augusto Algueró (musician), Pilar Tabares (music director of TVE), Maria Teresa Segura (Spanish Head of Delegation for the Eurovision Song Contest), Daniel Velázquez (music coordinator of the City Council of Madrid), Juan Ignacio Ocaña (director of the TVE territorial centre in Madrid), Hugo de Campos (presenter), Silvia Gambino (actress), Juan Luis Ayllón Piquero (Eurovision expert) and José Martín Alfageme (Eurovision expert).

The winning song was "Dile que la quiero", written by Alejandro Abad, and performed by David Civera. Civera was welcomed back on stage by the previous year's winner Serafín Zubiri. The show ended with a reprise of the winning entry.

Final – 23 February 2001
R/O	Artist	Song	Jury	Public	Total	Place
1	Locomía	"Música, música"	4	0	4	17
2	Noemí	"Sin rencor"	57	6	63	4
3	David Castedo	"Un terrón de azúcar"	26	9	35	10
4	Paula	"Prisionera de tu amor"	6	0	6	15
5	Sonia and Selena	"Quiero bailar"	29	12	41	9
6	Hi Priority	"A nadie como a ti"	60	24	84	2
7	David Civera	"Dile que la quiero"	72	36	108	1
8	Trans X	"Amándonos"	11	0	11	12
9	Mina	"Libres"	60	18	78	3
10	Toni and Miguel	"Baila"	4	0	4	17
11	Kingdom Brothers	"Nada es igual"	8	0	8	13
12	Herbert	"Abre los brazos"	30	30	60	5
13	Virginia	"No tengas miedo de amar"	50	0	50	7
14	Frank Bravo	"No sé por qué"	8	0	8	13
15	Natalia	"Porque quiero"	30	3	33	11
16	Román	"Nada sin ti"	6	0	6	15
17	Mister Robinson	"Un flechazo de Cupido"	28	15	43	8
18	Luna	"No pidas más amor"	31	21	52	6
19	Oxígeno	"Niña bonita"	2	0	2	19
20	Silvana	"Dónde"	0	0	0	20

Detailed Jury Votes
R/O	Song	Augusto Algueró	Pilar Tabares	Maria Teresa Segura	Daniel Velázquez	Juan Ignacio Ocaña	Hugo de Campos	Silvia Gambino	Juan Luis Ayllón Piquero	José Martín Alfageme	Total
1	"Música, música"			2						2	4
2	"Sin rencor"	10	3	5	8	10	7	10	4		57
3	"Un terrón de azúcar"	8	2	7		4			1	4	26
4	"Prisionera de tu amor"			6							6
5	"Quiero bailar"		8		7		6	6	2		29
6	"A nadie como a ti"	12		12		8	3	12	6	7	60
7	"Dile que la quiero"	5	10	10	12	6	2	7	8	12	72
8	"Amándonos"			8		2				1	11
9	"Libres"	4	6	4	5	12	4	5	10	10	60
10	"Baila"	3						1			4
11	"Nada es igual"			3		1		4			8
12	"Abre los brazos"		5		10	3	12				30
13	"No tengas miedo de amar"	1	12		6		8	3	12	8	50
14	"No sé por qué"	6	1		1						8
15	"Porque quiero"		4		4	7	10	2	3		30
16	"Nada sin ti"									6	6
17	"Un flechazo de Cupido"		7	1	2	5	1		7	5	28
18	"No pidas más amor"	7			3		5	8	5	3	31
19	"Niña bonita"	2									2
20	"Dónde"										0

== At Eurovision ==
The Eurovision Song Contest 2001 took place at Parken Stadium in Copenhagen, Denmark, on 12 May 2001. The relegation rules introduced for the 1997 contest were again utilised ahead of the 2001 contest, based on each country's average points total in previous contests. The 23 participants were made up of the host country, the "Big Four" (France, Germany, Spain and the United Kingdom), and the 12 countries with the highest average scores between the 1996 and 2000 contests competed in the final. As a member of the "Big Four", Spain automatically qualified to compete in the contest. On 21 November 2000, an allocation draw was held which determined the running order and Spain was set to perform in position 13, following the entry from Ireland and before the entry from France. Spain finished in sixth place with 76 points.

The contest was broadcast on La Primera, with commentary by José Luis Uribarri. The broadcast of the contest was watched by 5.63 million viewers in Spain with a market share of 45%.

=== Voting ===
Below is a breakdown of points awarded to Spain and awarded by Spain in the contest. The nation awarded its 12 points to Greece in the contest.

TVE appointed Jennifer Rope to announce the results of the Spanish televote during the final.

Points awarded to Spain
Score	Country
12 points	Israel
10 points	
8 points	Greece
7 points	Netherlands; Portugal
6 points	Turkey
5 points	Bosnia and Herzegovina; France; Sweden
4 points	Latvia; Norway
3 points	Estonia; Ireland; United Kingdom
2 points	Iceland
1 point	Poland; Slovenia

Points awarded by Spain
Score	Country
12 points	Greece
10 points	Germany
8 points	Estonia
7 points	Denmark
6 points	Portugal
5 points	Sweden
4 points	Malta
3 points	France
2 points	Slovenia
1 point	United Kingdom
