= Lithuania in the Eurovision Song Contest 2001 =

- Eurovision Song Contest 2001
- Participating broadcaster: Lithuanian National Radio and Television (LRT)
- Country: Lithuania
- Selection process: "Eurovizijos" dainų konkurso nacionalinė atranka
- Selection date: 9 March 2001

Competing entry
- Song: "You Got Style"
- Artist: Skamp
- Songwriters: Viktoras Diawara; Vilius Alesius; Erica Jennings

Placement
- Final result: 13th, 35 points

Participation chronology

Lithuania was represented at the Eurovision Song Contest 2001 with the song "You Got Style", written by Viktoras Diawara, Vilius Alesius, and Erica Jennings, and performed by the group Skamp. The Lithuanian participating broadcaster, Lithuanian National Radio and Television (LRT), selected its entry through the national final entitled "Eurovizijos" dainų konkurso nacionalinė atranka. The broadcaster returned to the contest after a one-year absence, following its relegation in 2000 as one of the six entrants with the lowest average scores over the previous five contests. The national final involved 15 competing entries and "You Got Style" performed by Skamp was selected as the winner following the combination of votes from a jury panel, votes from the venue audience, and a public vote.

Lithuania competed in the Eurovision Song Contest which took place on 12 May 2001. Performing during the show in position eight, Lithuania placed thirteenth out of the 24 participating countries, scoring 35 points.

== Background ==
Prior to the 2001 contest, Lithuanian National Radio and Television (LRT) had participated in the Eurovision Song Contest representing Lithuania twice since its first entry in 1994. Its best placing in the contest was twentieth, achieved in 1999 with the song "Strazdas" performed by Aistė.

As part of its duties as participating broadcaster, LRT organises the selection of its entry in the Eurovision Song Contest and broadcasts the event in the country. The broadcaster selected its debut entry in 1994 through an internal selection, while it internally selected its 1999 entry. For 2001, LRT organized "Eurovizijos" dainų konkurso nacionalinė atranka as the national final to select its entry for Eurovision.

== Before Eurovision ==
=== "Eurovizijos" dainų konkurso nacionalinė atranka ===
"Eurovizijos" dainų konkurso nacionalinė atranka (Eurovision Song Contest national selection) was the national final format developed by LRT in order to select its entry for the Eurovision Song Contest 2001. The competition took place on 9 March 2001 at the Palace of Sports and Culture in Vilnius, hosted by Neringa Svetikaitė and Darius Užkuraitis, and was broadcast on LTV and LTV2.

==== Competing entries ====
LRT opened a submission period for artists and songwriters to submit their entries with the deadline on 12 November 2000. On 8 January 2001, LRT announced the 15 entries selected for the competition from 36 submissions received. The eight-member jury panel that selected the competing entries consisted of Gytis Daugėla (President of the Music Culture Support Fund), Faustas Latėnas (composer), Janina Miščiukaitė (singer), Justas Mamontovas (recording company "Partija" director), Simona Jansonaitė (Respublika journalist), Vytautas Juozapaitis (opera singer), Daiva Rinkevičiūtė (Lietuvos rytas journalist), and Zita Kelmickaitė (Head of LRT's music editorial board).

==== Final ====
The competition took place on 9 March 2001 and featured the 15 competing entries. "You Got Style" performed by Skamp was selected as the winner following the combination of votes from a jury panel (50%), the audience in the venue (25%), and public televoting (25%). More than 5,100 televotes were received during the show. The members of the jury consisted of Vaclovas Augustinas (composer and conductor), Zita Kelmickaitė (Head of LRT's music editorial board), Vytautas Kernagis (singer-songwriter), Viktoras Malinauskas (singer), Ramunė Piekautaitė (fashion designer), Daiva Rinkevičiūtė (TV antena journalist), Gintaras Sodeika (Chairman of the Lithuanian Composers' Union), Daiva Tamošiūnaitė (Radiocentras presenter), Gintaras Varnas (director), and Edita Vilčiauskienė (Lietuvos Radijas music editor). In addition to the performances of the competing entries, Arnis Mednis opened the show with his 2001 Latvian Eurovision entry "Too Much".

Final – 9 March 2001
R/O	Artist	Song	Songwriter(s)	Percentage	Place
1	Merlin	"Kažkada"	Merlin, Rodionas Kolominas, Rimvydas Stankevičius	—	—
2	Delfinai	"Viskas bus gerai"	Stanislavas Stavickis	—	—
3	Neda and Audrius	"Stars"	Andrius Borisevičius	—	—
4	La Vita	"Parodyk ką gali"	M. Karčemarskas, Andrius Katkus, Domas Bajorūnas, Mantas Jankavičius	—	—
5	Rosita Čivilytė	"Švyturys"	Rosita Čivilytė	—	—
6	Naktinės Personos	"Ša-la-la"	Aras Veberis, Alanas Chošnau	—	—
7	Cloudmaker	"No Reason Why (Kodėl, kodėl)"	Andrius Mamontovas	15%	2
8	Avenue	"Le vent"	E. Harocourt, Izidai Stankevičiūtė, Rima Vaickelionytė	—	—
9	Ričardas Vitkus	"Dreamers"	Ričardas Vitkus	—	—
10	Indrė	"Fly With Me"	Indrė Launikonytė	—	—
11	Smile	"It's All About Us"	Agnė Ginetė	—	—
12	B'Avarija	"Duok man"	Deivydas Zvonkus, Juozas Liesis	6%	3
13	Rūta Lukoševičiūtė	"Endless Day"	Ruta Lukoševičiūtė, Dalius Pletnovias	—	—
14	Rebelheart	"The Way to You"	Regimantas Turūta, Rebelheart	—	—
15	Skamp	"You Got Style"	Viktoras Diawara, Vilius Alesius, Erica Jennings	61.5%	1

== At Eurovision ==
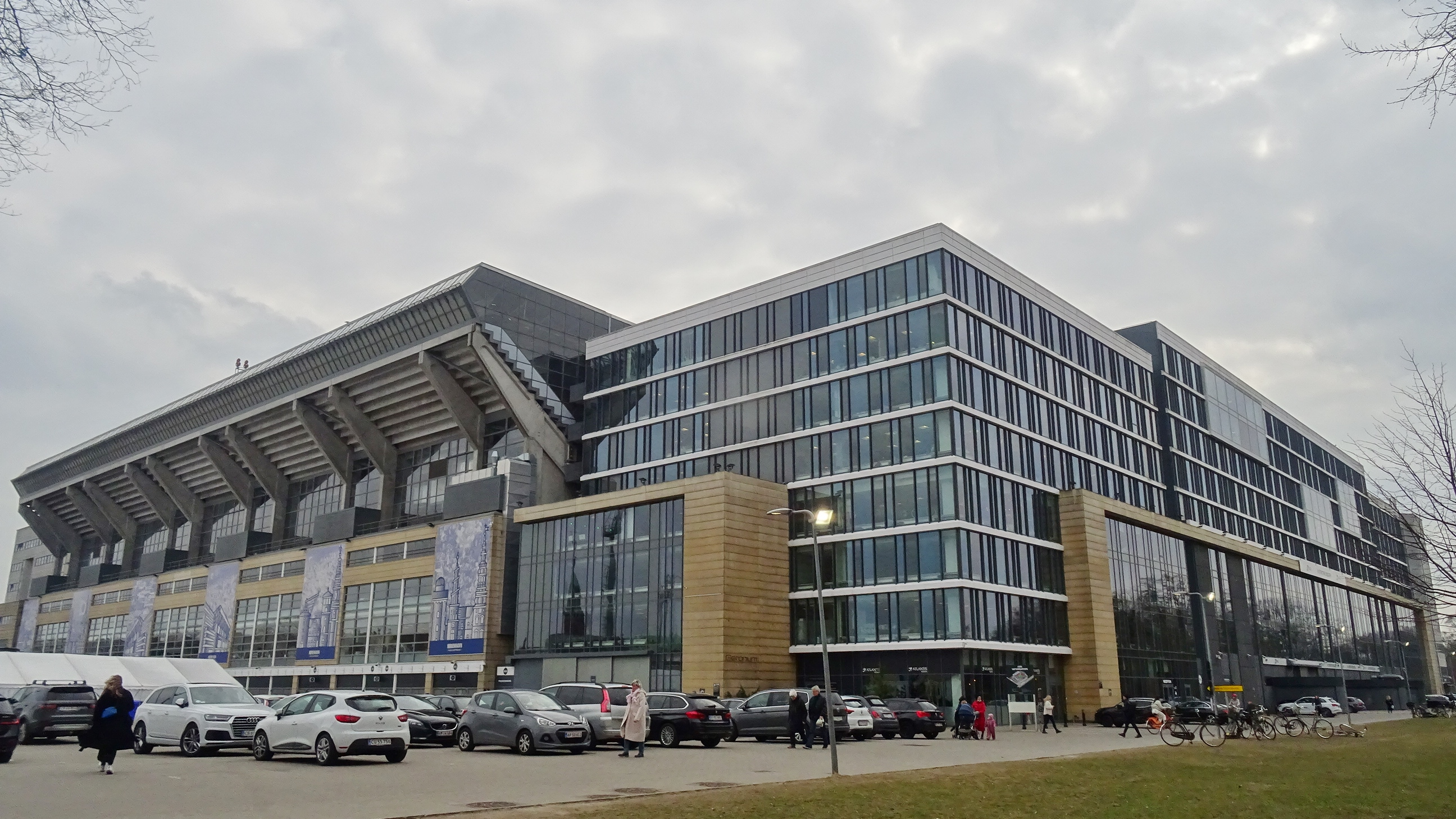
The Eurovision Song Contest 2001 took place at Parken Stadium in Copenhagen, Denmark.

The Eurovision Song Contest 2001 took place at Parken Stadium in Copenhagen, Denmark, on 12 May 2001. The relegation rules introduced for the 1997 contest were again utilised ahead of the 2001 contest, based on each country's average points total in previous contests. The 23 participants were made up of the host country, the "Big Four" (France, Germany, Spain, and the United Kingdom), and the 12 countries with the highest average scores between the 1996 and 2000 contests competed in the final. On 21 November 2000, an allocation draw was held which determined the running order, and Lithuania was set to perform in position eight, following the entry from Sweden and before the entry from Latvia. Lithuania finished in 13th place with 35 points.

The contest was broadcast on LRT, with commentary by Darius Užkuraitis.

=== Voting ===
Voting during the show involved each country awarding points from 1-8, 10 and 12 as determined by either 100% televoting or a combination of 50% televoting and 50% national jury. In cases where televoting was not possible, only the votes of the eight-member national juries were tabulated. Lithuania received 35 points, with its highest award of 10 points coming from Russia. The nation awarded its top 12 points to contest winners Estonia. LRT appointed Loreta Tarozaitė as its spokesperson to announce the Lithuanian voting results during the show. Below is a breakdown of points awarded to Lithuania and awarded by Lithuania in the contest.

Points awarded to Lithuania
Score	Country
12 points	
10 points	Russia
8 points	
7 points	
6 points	
5 points	Latvia; Netherlands
4 points	Israel; United Kingdom
3 points	
2 points	Bosnia and Herzegovina; Slovenia
1 point	Iceland; Ireland; Sweden

Points awarded by Lithuania
Score	Country
12 points	Estonia
10 points	Russia
8 points	Latvia
7 points	France
6 points	Denmark
5 points	Greece
4 points	Slovenia
3 points	United Kingdom
2 points	Sweden
1 point	Malta
