= Croatia in the Eurovision Song Contest 2001 =

- Eurovision Song Contest 2001
- Participating broadcaster: Croatian Radiotelevision (HRT)
- Country: Croatia
- Selection process: Dora 2001
- Selection date: 4 March 2001

Competing entry
- Song: "Strings of My Heart"
- Artist: Vanna
- Songwriters: Tonči Huljić; Vjekoslava Huljić; Ante Pecotić

Placement
- Final result: 10th, 42 points

Participation chronology

Croatia was represented at the Eurovision Song Contest 2001 with the song "Strings of My Heart", written by Tonči Huljić, Vjekoslava Huljić, and Ante Pecotić, and performed by Vanna. The Croatian participating broadcaster, Croatian Radiotelevision (HRT), organised the national final Dora 2001 to select its entry for the contest. Twenty entries competed in the national final on 4 March 2001 and "Strune ljubavi" performed by Vanna was selected as the winner following the combination of votes from five regional juries, a six-member expert jury, a regional televote and an online vote. The song was later translated from Croatian to English for Eurovision and was titled "Strings of My Heart".

Croatia competed in the Eurovision Song Contest which took place on 12 May 2001. Performing during the show in position 10, Croatia placed tenth out of the 23 participating countries, scoring 42 points.

== Background ==
Prior to the 2001 Contest, Croatian Radiotelevision (HRT) had participated in the Eurovision Song Contest representing Croatia eight times since its first entry in 1993. Its best result in the contest was fourth, which it achieved on two occasions: in 1996 with the song "Sveta ljubav" performed by Maja Blagdan and in 1999 with the song "Marija Magdalena" performed by Doris Dragović. In 2000, Croatia placed ninth with "Kad zaspu anđeli" performed by Goran Karan.

As part of its duties as participating broadcaster, HRT organises the selection of its entry in the Eurovision Song Contest and broadcasts the event in the country. Between 1993 and 2000, the broadcaster organised the national final Dora in order to select its entry for the contest, a method that continued for its 2001 participation.

== Before Eurovision ==
=== Dora 2001 ===
Dora 2001 was the ninth edition of the national selection Dora organised by HRT to select its entry for the Eurovision Song Contest 2001. The competition consisted of twenty entries competing in one final on 4 March 2001 at the Studio 11 of HRT in Zagreb, hosted by Duško Ćurlić and Bojana Gregorić. The show was broadcast on HTV1 and via radio on HR 2 as well as online via the broadcaster's website hrt.hr.

==== Competing entries ====
On 16 November 2000, HRT opened a submission period where artists and composers were able to submit their entries to the broadcaster with the deadline on 17 December 2000. Artists were required to be signed to record companies or have had at least one commercial release in order to participate in the competition. An additional seven composers were also invited by HRT to submit songs following consultation with the Croatian Composers' Society (HDS) and Croatian Musicians Union (HDS): Tonči Huljić, Rajko Dujmić, Miro Buljan, Zrinko Tutić, Nenad Ninčević, Zdenko Runjić and Đorđe Novković. 170 entries were received by the broadcaster during the submission period. A nine-member expert committee consisting of Pero Gotovac, Nikica Kalogjera, Stjepan Mihaljinec, Matija Dedić, Siniša Doronjga, Husein Hasanefendić, Stjepan Fučkar, Aleksandar Kostadinov and Velimir Đuretić reviewed the received submissions and selected twenty artists and songs for the competition. HRT announced the competing entries on 15 January 2001 and among the artists were Tereza Kesovija who represented Monaco in 1966 and Yugoslavia in 1972, Novi fosili who represented Yugoslavia in 1987, Vladimir Kočiš Zec of Novi fosili, Putokazi which represented Croatia in 1993 as Put, and Tony Cetinski who represented Croatia in 1994.

Prior to the competition, "Ne bih te mogla voljeti više", written by Enes Tvrtković and to have been performed by Ivana Banfić, was withdrawn due to disagreements with the language of the song to be performed and replaced with "Za tebe stvorena" performed by Vesna Pisarović. On 2 February 2001, Emilija Kokić who won Eurovision for Yugoslavia in 1989 as a member of Riva replaced Minea as the co-performer of the song "Ljepota". The running order of the final was determined during a draw on 30 January 2001.

Artist	Song	Songwriter(s)
Branimir Mihaljević	"Milenij ljubavi"	Mario Mihaljević, Branimir Mihaljević, Fayo
Branka Delić	"Moja je ljubav umorna"	Branka Delić, Silvestar Dragoje
Bruno Krajcar	"Balun"	Bruno Krajcar
Dado Topić	"Što znači zbogom"	Ante Pecotić
Emilija Kokić and Juci	"Ljepota"	Željko Pavičić
Josip Katalenić	"Povedi me"	Inge Privora, Jasminka Toth, Marko Tomasović
Ksenija	"Igra"	Ksenija Sobotinčić, Fortunato Antić
Maja Šuput	"Hello"	Marko Tomasović
Mirjana Pospiš	"Pjesmo moja"	Mirjana Pospiš
Novi fosili	"Takva ljubav"	Stevo Cvikić, Rajko Dujmić
Perle	"Pokraj bistra izvora"	Asja Kamle, Ingrid Flesch
Petar Grašo	"Ni mrvu sriće"	Nenad Ninčević, Zdenko Runjić
Plava Trava Zaborava	"Svane li dan"	Nenad Ninčević, Damir Farkaš
Putokazi	"Vilino kolo"	Elvis Stanić
Tereza Kesovija	"Zlatni ključ sudbine"	Željko Pavičić, Ivo Lesić
Tony Cetinski	"Iz dana u dan"	Ante Pecotić
Vanna	"Strune ljubavi"	Tonči Huljić, Vjekoslava Huljić, Ante Pecotić
Vesna Pisarović	"Za tebe stvorena"	Milana Vlaović
Vladimir Kočiš Zec	"Nije kao prije"	Leonardo Baksa-Čeći, Vladimir Kočiš Zec
Zdenka Kovačiček	"Ja živim svoj san"	Marko Tomasović, Inge Privora

==== Final ====
The final took place on 4 March 2001. Twelve of the twenty competing songs were performed with HRT's Revijski Orchestra with its own conductors and the winner, "Strune ljubavi" performed by Vanna, was determined by a combination of votes from four regional juries, an expert jury, a public televote divided into four telephone regions in Croatia and a public online vote. A total of 246,836 votes were registered by the public: 242,491 votes through televoting and 3,895 votes through online voting. The writers of the winning song also received a monetary award of 100,000 kuna. In addition to the performances of the competing entries, the Zagreb Dance Ensemble, Bojana Gregorić and Goran Karan, who represented Croatia in 2000, performed as the interval acts during the show.

Final – 4 March 2001
R/O	Artist	Song	Conductor	Points	Place
1	Petar Grašo	"Ni mrvu sriće"	Stipica Kalogjera	72	3
2	Branimir Mihaljević	"Milenij ljubavi"	Silvije Glojnarić	44	6
3	Tereza Kesovija	"Zlatni ključ sudbine"	Stipica Kalogjera	3	17
4	Vesna Pisarović	"Za tebe stvorena"	Nikica Kalogjera	69	4
5	Mirjana Pospiš	"Pjesmo moja"	Stjepan Mihaljinec	39	7
6	Bruno Krajcar	"Balun"	Alan Bjelinski	2	18
7	Perle	"Pokraj bistra izvora"	Silvije Glojnarić	12	15
8	Putokazi	"Vilino kolo"	Silvije Glojnarić	37	8
9	Novi fosili	"Takva ljubav"	Nikica Kalogjera	17	12
10	Vanna	"Strune ljubavi"	Stipica Kalogjera	100	1
11	Josip Katalenić	"Povedi me"	Alan Bjelinski	16	14
12	Vladimir Kočiš Zec	"Nije kao prije"	Zrinko Tutić	2	18
13	Zdenka Kovačiček	"Ja živim svoj san"	n/a	17	12
14	Maja Šuput	"Hello"	n/a	27	9
15	Dado Topić	"Što znači zbogom"	n/a	18	11
16	Branka Delić	"Moja je ljubav umorna"	n/a	2	18
17	Plava Trava Zaborava	"Svane li dan"	n/a	23	10
18	Ksenija	"Igra"	n/a	5	16
19	Tony Cetinski	"Iz dana u dan"	n/a	60	5
20	Emilija Kokić and Juci	"Ljepota"	n/a	73	2

Detailed Voting Results
Song	Jury						Public Vote					Total
Song	A	B	C	D	E	F	G	H	I	J	K	Total
"Ni mrvu sriće"	7	10	2	6	7	6	7	12	7	6	2	72
"Milenij ljubavi"	3	3			1		10	7	10	7	3	44
"Zlatni ključ sudbine"						2		1				3
"Za tebe stvorena"		8	10	5	5	1	12	6	8	8	6	69
"Pjesmo moja"	2		3	3	10		4	4	3	5	5	39
"Balun"									2			2
"Pokraj bistra izvora"					2	4	1	5				12
"Vilino kolo"	8			12		12			1		4	37
"Takva ljubav"			6		4	7						17
"Strune ljubavi"	10	12	8	10	12	10	6	8	6	10	8	100
"Povedi me"							2			2	12	16
"Nije kao prije"	1	1										2
"Ja živim svoj san"	12			2		3						17
"Hello"							5	3	5	4	10	27
"Što znači zbogom"	5	6	1	1		5						18
"Moja je ljubav umorna"		2										2
"Svane li dan"		5	4	7	6					1		23
"Igra"			5									5
"Iz dana u dan"	4	7	12	8	8	8	3	2	4	3	1	60
"Ljepota"	6	4	7	4	3		8	10	12	12	7	73
Dora 2001 voting groups
A: Varaždin; B: Split; C: Rijeka; D: Zagreb; E: Osijek; F: Expert jury; G: Slavonia; H: Dalmatia; I: Istria and Primorje; J: Northwest and Central Croatia; K: Online vote

Members of the Jury
Jury	Members
Varaždin	Branko Oreški; Branka Funda; Srećko Krištofić; Vesna Sertić Grobenski; Stjepan Fortuna; Katica Gregurević
Split	Anita Elač; Davor Perić; Jasminka Grubač; Davor Jašek; Dragan Mijoč; Asja Skaramuca
Rijeka	Teodora Festini; Antonija Pocrnić; Ivan Prpić; Slobodan Vujović; Marica Ursić; Darko Bokan
Zagreb	Gordana Brus; Danijel Sentić; Tatjana Čosić; Božidar Škrljac; Mirko Novoselnik; Izabela Žilić
Osijek	Željko Vukadinović; Ana Matoš; Dominik Botica; Diana Biondić; Veljko Valentin Škorvaga; Katica Jakobović
Experts	Gabi Novak; Melisa Skender; Tomislav Krkač; Siniša Škarica; Željko Mesar; Hrvoje Hegedušić

== At Eurovision ==
The Eurovision Song Contest 2001 took place at Parken Stadium in Copenhagen, Denmark, on 12 May 2001. The relegation rules introduced for the 1997 contest were again utilised ahead of the 2001 contest, based on each country's average points total in previous contests. The 23 participants were made up of the host country, the "Big Four" (France, Germany, Spain and the United Kingdom), and the 12 countries with the highest average scores between the 1996 and 2000 contests competed in the final. On 21 November 2000, a special allocation draw was held which determined the running order and Croatia was set to perform in position 10, following the entry from Latvia and before the entry from Portugal. At the contest, Croatia finished in tenth place with 42 points.

The contest was broadcast on HRT 1.

=== Voting ===
Below is a breakdown of points awarded to Croatia and awarded by Croatia in the contest. The nation awarded its 12 points to Denmark in the contest.

HRT appointed Daniela Trbović as its spokesperson to announce the Croatian votes during the show.

Points awarded to Croatia
Score	Country
12 points	
10 points	Malta; Turkey
8 points	
7 points	Bosnia and Herzegovina; Greece
6 points	
5 points	Slovenia
4 points	
3 points	Germany
2 points	
1 point	

Points awarded by Croatia
Score	Country
12 points	Denmark
10 points	Bosnia and Herzegovina
8 points	Slovenia
7 points	Turkey
6 points	France
5 points	Greece
4 points	Sweden
3 points	United Kingdom
2 points	Estonia
1 point	Germany
