= Netherlands in the Eurovision Song Contest 2001 =

- Eurovision Song Contest 2001
- Participating broadcaster: Nederlandse Omroep Stichting (NOS)
- Country: Netherlands
- Selection process: Nationaal Songfestival 2001
- Selection date: 3 March 2001

Competing entry
- Song: "Out on My Own"
- Artist: Michelle
- Songwriters: André Remkes; Dirk-Jan Vermeij

Placement
- Final result: 18th, 16 points

Participation chronology

The Netherlands was represented at the Eurovision Song Contest 2001 with the song "Out on My Own", written by Dirk-Jan Vermeij and André Remkes, and performed by Michelle. The Dutch participating broadcaster, Nederlandse Omroep Stichting (NOS), selected its entry for the contest through Nationaal Songfestival 2001. Six entries competed in the national final on 3 March 2001 where "Out on My Own" performed by Michelle was selected as the winner following the combination of votes from three jury panels and a public vote.

The Netherlands competed in the Eurovision Song Contest which took place on 12 May 2001. Performing as the opening entry for the show in position 1, the Netherlands placed eighteenth out of the 23 participating countries, scoring 16 points.

== Background ==
Prior to the 2001 contest, Nederlandse Televisie Stichting (NTS) until 1969, and Nederlandse Omroep Stichting (NOS) since 1970, had participated in the Eurovision Song Contest representing the Netherlands forty-two times since NTS début in the inaugural contest in 1956. They have won the contest four times: in 1957 with the song "Net als toen" performed by Corry Brokken; in 1959 with the song "'n Beetje" performed by Teddy Scholten; in 1969 as one of four countries to tie for first place with "De troubadour" performed by Lenny Kuhr; and finally in 1975 with "Ding-a-dong" performed by the group Teach-In. The Dutch least successful result has been last place, which they have achieved on four occasions, most recently in the 1968 contest. They has also received nul points on two occasions; in 1962 and 1963.

As part of its duties as participating broadcaster, NOS organises the selection of its entry in the Eurovision Song Contest and broadcasts the event in the country. The Dutch broadcasters had used various methods to select the Dutch entry in the past, such as the Nationaal Songfestival, a live televised national final to choose the performer, song or both to compete at Eurovision. However, internal selections have also been held on occasion. Since 1998, NOS has organised Nationaal Songfestival in order to select both the artist and song for the contest, a method that was continued for its 2001 entry.

== Before Eurovision ==
=== Nationaal Songfestival 2001 ===
Nationaal Songfestival 2000 was the national final developed by NOS that selected its entry for the Eurovision Song Contest 2001. Eight entries competed in the competition that consisted of a final on 3 March 2001 which took place at the Rotterdam Ahoy in Rotterdam, hosted by Paul de Leeuw and was broadcast on Nederland 2. The first part of the national final was watched by 1.8 million viewers in the Netherlands with a market share of 25%, while the second part was watched by 2.1 million viewers with a market share of 34%.

==== Competing entries ====
A submission period was opened by the Dutch broadcaster on 20 July 2000 where artists and composers were able to submit their entries until 2 October 2000. In addition to the public submission, NOS directly invited certain composers and production agencies, such as record companies and production teams, to submit entries, while an amateur songwriting workshop was organised by Conamus under the instruction of professional songwriters Alan Michael, Edwin Schimscheimer and Jan Rot which resulted in the submission of four songs. 304 submissions were received by the broadcaster at the closing of the deadline, and the eight selected competing entries were announced on 27 December 2000. The selection of the entries for the competition occurred through the decision by a selection commission consisting of Willem van Beusekom, Menno Timmerman, Daan van Rijsbergen and Ad Kraamer. One of the entries, "Danielle" performed by Montezuma's Revenge, came from the Conamus workshop.

Artist	Song	Songwriter(s)
Bart Brandjes	"Count Me Out"	Erwin Radjinder
Céline and René	"Simply in Love"	Wim Rijken, Haro Slok, Henkjan Smits
Ebonique	"So Much Love"	Tjeerd van Zanen, Alan Michael
Friday Night Fever	"Love Will Rule the World"	Peter de Wijn
Michelle	"Out on My Own"	Dirk-Jan Vermeij, André Remkes
Montezuma's Revenge	"Danielle"	Bouwe de Jong, Arthur Cune
Paul de Graaf	"Laat je zien"	Paul de Graaf, Paul Fiselier
Sven	"Fool for You"	John Geuzinge

==== Final ====
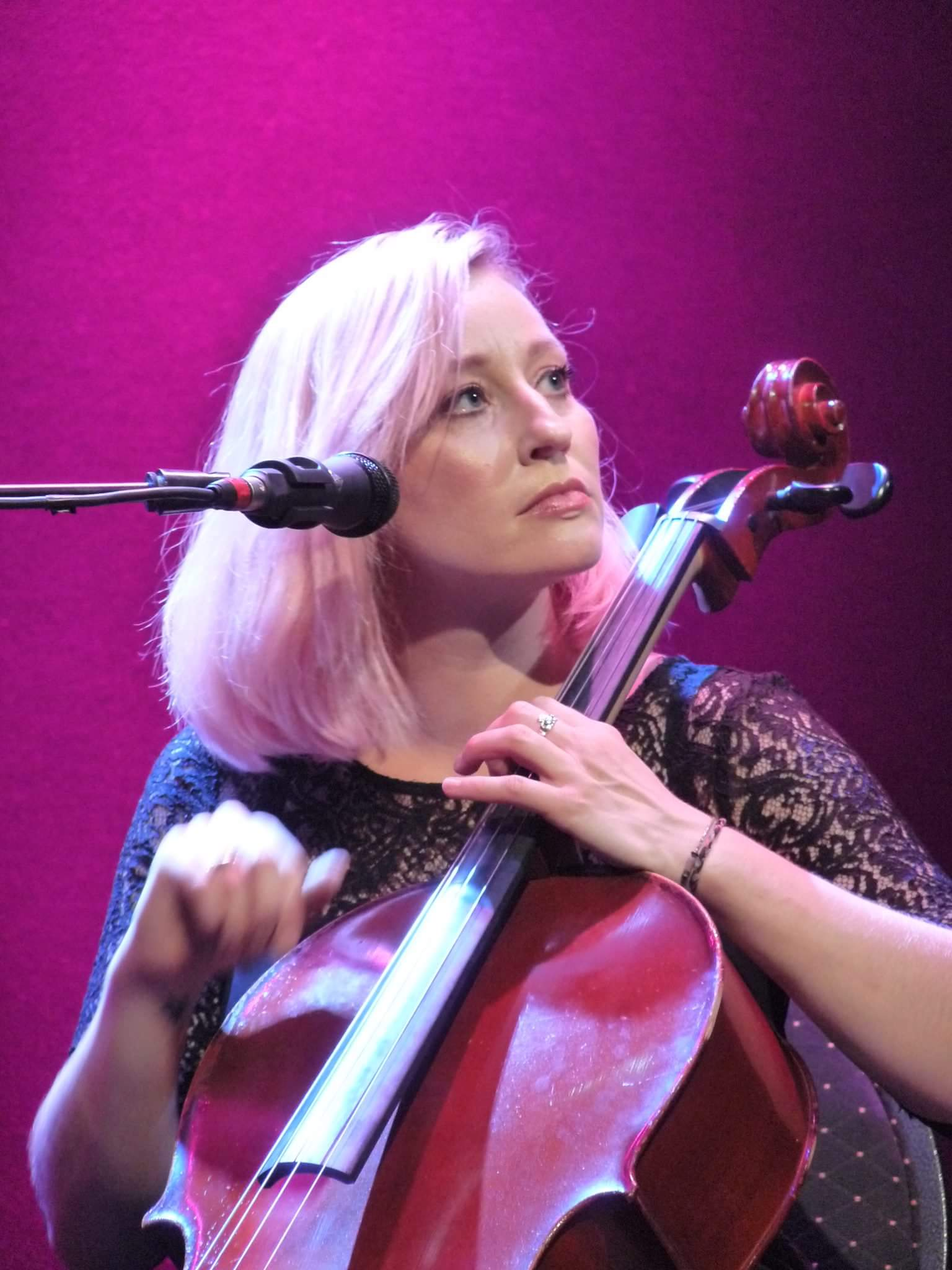
Michelle went on to represent Netherlands in the 2001 contest.

The final took place on 3 March 2001 where eight entries competed. The winner, "Out on My Own" performed by Michelle, was selected by the 50/50 combination of a public televote and the votes of three juries: an artists jury, a composers jury and a music industry professionals jury. The viewers and the juries each had a total of 120 points to award. Each jury group distributed their points as follows: 1, 2, 3, 5, 7, 10 and 12 points. The viewer vote was based on the percentage of votes each song achieved through the following voting methods: telephone and SMS voting. For example, if a song gained 10% of the vote, then that entry would be awarded 10% of 120 points rounded to the nearest integer: 12 points. More than 112,000 votes were cast by the public during the show, more than 27,000 of which were via SMS.

In addition to the performances of the competing entries, the show featured guest performances by Dutch Divas, Brotherhood of Man (who won Eurovision for the United Kingdom in 1976), Herreys (who won Eurovision for Sweden in 1984) and past Dutch Eurovision entrants Lenny Kuhr (1969), Getty Kaspers (1975), Justine Pelmelay (1989), Maxine and Franklin Brown (1996), Marlayne (1999), and Linda Wagenmakers (2000).

Final – 3 March 2001
R/O	Artist	Song	Jury	Televote	Total	Place
1	Friday Night Fever	"Love Will Rule the World"	8	2	10	5
2	Céline and René	"Simply in Love"	6	3	9	6
3	Bart Brandjes	"Count Me Out"	19	15	34	4
4	Paul de Graaf	"Laat je zien"	3	5	8	7
5	Ebonique	"So Much Love"	29	25	54	2
6	Montezuma's Revenge	"Danielle"	18	18	36	3
7	Michelle	"Out on My Own"	34	50	84	1
8	Sven	"Fool for You"	3	2	5	8

Detailed Jury Votes
R/O	Song	Artists	Composers	Industry	Total
1	"Love Will Rule the World"	5	3		8
2	"Simply in Love"	1	2	3	6
3	"Count Me Out"	7	7	5	19
4	"Laat je zien"	2		1	3
5	"So Much Love"	10	12	7	29
6	"Danielle"	3	5	10	18
7	"Out on My Own"	12	10	12	34
8	"Fool for You"		1	2	3

== At Eurovision ==
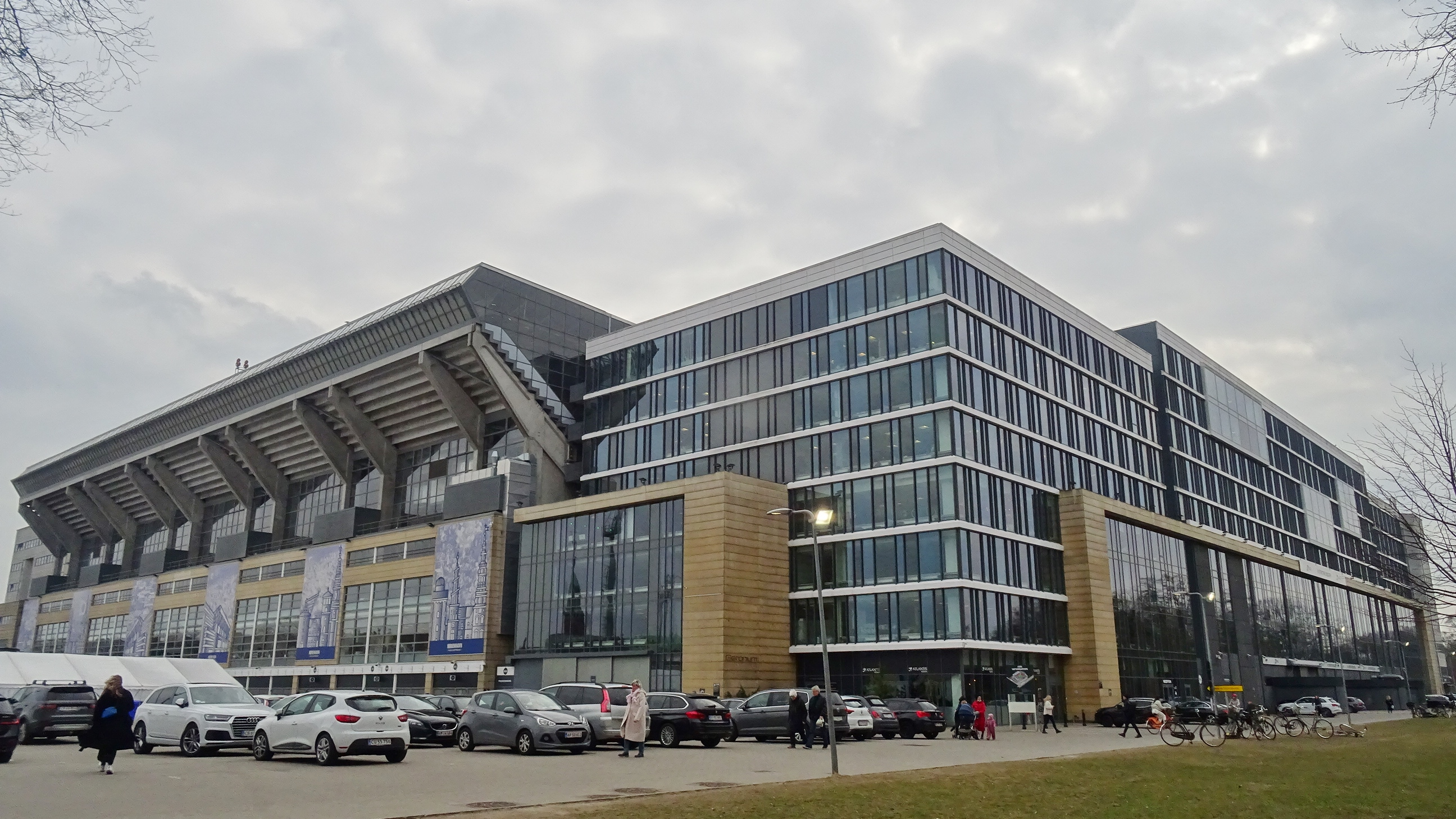
The Eurovision Song Contest 2001 took place at Parken Stadium in Copenhagen, Denmark.

The Eurovision Song Contest 2001 took place at Parken Stadium in Copenhagen, Denmark, on 12 May 2001. The relegation rules introduced for the 1997 contest were again utilised ahead of the 2001 contest, based on each country's average points total in previous contests. The 23 participants were made up of the host country, the "Big Four" (France, Germany, Spain and the United Kingdom), and the 12 countries with the highest average scores between the 1996 and 2000 contests competed in the final. On 21 November 2000, a special allocation draw was held which determined the running order and the Netherlands was set to open the show and perform in position 1, before the entry from Iceland. The Netherlands finished in eighteenth place with 16 points.

The contest was broadcast on Nederland 2 (with commentary by Willem van Beusekom) and on radio stations Radio 2 (with commentary by Michiel van Erp) and Radio 3 (with commentary by Paul de Leeuw and Cornald Maas). NOS appointed Marlayne, who represented the Netherlands in 1999, as its spokesperson to announce the Dutch votes during the show.

=== Voting ===
Below is a breakdown of points awarded to the Netherlands and awarded by the Netherlands in the contest. The nation awarded its 12 points to the Estonia in the contest.

Points awarded to the Netherlands
Score	Country
12 points	
10 points	
8 points	
7 points	
6 points	Portugal
5 points	Israel
4 points	Slovenia
3 points	
2 points	
1 point	Russia

Points awarded by the Netherlands
Score	Country
12 points	Estonia
10 points	Denmark
8 points	France
7 points	Spain
6 points	Greece
5 points	Lithuania
4 points	Slovenia
3 points	Turkey
2 points	United Kingdom
1 point	Germany
