= Denmark in the Eurovision Song Contest 2001 =

- Eurovision Song Contest 2001
- Participating broadcaster: Danmarks Radio (DR)
- Country: Denmark
- Selection process: Dansk Melodi Grand Prix 2001
- Selection date: 17 February 2001

Competing entry
- Song: "Never Ever Let You Go"
- Artist: Rollo & King
- Songwriters: Søren Poppe; Stefan Nielsen; Thomas Brekling

Placement
- Final result: 2nd, 177 points

Participation chronology

Denmark was represented at the Eurovision Song Contest 2001 with the song "Never Ever Let You Go", written by Søren Poppe, Stefan Nielsen, and Thomas Brekling, and performed by the duo Rollo & King. The Danish participating broadcaster, DR (DR), organised the national final Dansk Melodi Grand Prix 2001 in order to select its entry for the contest. In addition, DR was also the host broadcaster and staged the event at the Parken Stadium in Copenhagen, after winning the previous edition with the song "Fly on the Wings of Love" by the Olsen Brothers.

Ten songs competed in the televised national final where "Der står et billede af dig på mit bord" performed by Rollo & King was the winner as decided upon through two rounds of jury voting and public voting. The song was later translated from Danish to English for Eurovision and was titled "Never Ever Let You Go". The Eurovision Song Contest took place on 12 May 2001. Performing as the closing entry during the show in position 23, Denmark placed second out of the 23 participating countries, scoring 177 points.

== Background ==
Prior to the 2001 contest, DR (DR) had participated in the Eurovision Song Contest representing Denmark thirty times since its first entry in 1957. It had won the contest, to this point, on two occasions: in 1963 with the song "Dansevise" performed by Grethe and Jørgen Ingmann, and in 2000 with the song "Fly on the Wings of Love" performed by Olsen Brothers.

As part of its duties as participating broadcaster, DR organises the selection of its entry in the Eurovision Song Contest and broadcasts the event in the country. The broadcaster organised the Dansk Melodi Grand Prix 2001 national final in order to select its entry for the 2001 contest; having selected all but one of its Eurovision entries through the Dansk Melodi Grand Prix.

== Before Eurovision ==
=== Dansk Melodi Grand Prix 2001 ===
Dansk Melodi Grand Prix 2001 was the 32nd edition of Dansk Melodi Grand Prix, the music competition that selects the Danish entries for the Eurovision Song Contest. DR held the event on 17 February 2001 at the MCH Messecenter Herning in Herning, hosted by Keld Heick and televised on DR1. The national final was watched by 1.998 million viewers in Denmark with a market share of 86%, making it the most popular show of the week in the country.

==== Format ====
Ten songs competed in one show where the winner was determined over two rounds of voting. In the first round, the top five songs based on the combination of votes from a public televote and a seven-member jury panel qualified to the superfinal. In the superfinal, the winner was determined again by the votes of the jury and public.

The seven-member jury panel was composed of:

- Michael Carøe – actor
- Birthe Wilke – singer, represented Denmark in the Eurovision Song Contest 1957 and 1959
- Jesper Bæhrenz – music journalist, radio and television host
- Ann-Mette Elten – singer
- Jesper Winge Leisner – composer
- Anne Dorte Michelsen – singer and composer
- Katrine Ring – DJ, music journalist and music expert

==== Competing entries ====
DR opened a submission period between 29 September 2000 and 3 November 2000 for composers to submit their entries. All composers and lyricists were required to be Danish citizens or have Danish residency, while all songs were required to be performed in Danish. The broadcaster received 332 entries during the submission period. A seven-member selection committee selected ten songs from the entries submitted to the broadcaster, while the artists of the selected entries were chosen by DR in consultation with their composers. The competing songs were announced on 13 December 2001 with their artists being announced on 4 January 2001. Among the artists was Helge Engelbrecht who represented Denmark in the 1987 contest as part of Bandjo. On 26 January 2001, it was announced that Kenny Lübcke who represented Denmark in the 1992 contest would replace Jesper Daus as the lead singer of the Parber Kerstein Band after Daus withdrew for health reasons.

Artist	Song	Songwriter(s)
Anita Lerche and Simon Munk	"Mit hjerte det banker"	Simon Munk, Per Lange
Anne Murillo	"Hvis du tænker lidt på mig"	Jan Lysdahl, Anne Murillo
Basix	"I Australien"	Niels Nørgaard, Morten Kjær
Helge Engelbrecht	"Som om det var i går"	Helge Engelbrecht
Johnny Hansen	"Lidt efter lidt"	Johnny Hansen, Nanna Kalinka Bjerke
Katrine Daugaard	"Sha la li sha la lej"	Ivar Lind Greiner
Parber Kerstein Band	"Drømmer om dig"	Jan Parber, Jes Kerstein
Rollo & King	"Der står et billede af dig på mit bord"	Søren Poppe, Stefan Nielsen
Sanne Gottlieb	"Tog jeg fejl"	Lise Cabble, Mette Mathiesen
Sanne Graulund and Ole Kibsgaard	"Et øje på dig"	Ole Kibsgaard, Sanne Graulund

==== Final ====
The final took place on 17 February 2001. Keld Heick was the overall host while each song was presented by previous winners of the danish pre-selection. In the first round of voting the top five advanced to the superfinal based on the votes of a public televote (4/5) and a seven-member jury (1/5). In the superfinal, the winner, "Der står et billede af dig på mit bord" performed by Rollo & King, was selected by the public and jury vote. The voting results of each of Denmark's four regions as well as the jury voting results in the superfinal were converted to points which were each distributed as follows: 4, 6, 8, 10 and 12 points.

In addition to the performances of the competing entries, Irish Eurovision Song Contest 1980 and 1987 winner Johnny Logan, and Fabrizio Faniello, the Maltese representative in the 2001 contest, performed as the interval acts.

Final – 17 February 2001
R/O	Artist	Song	Presenter	Result
1	Parber Kerstein Band	"Drømmer om dig"	Olsen Brothers (2000)	—N/a
2	Anita Lerche and Simon Munk	"Mit hjerte det banker"	Anders Frandsen (1991)	—N/a
3	Katrine Daugaard	"Sha la li sha la lej"	Kølig Kaj (1997)	Advanced
4	Sanne Gottlieb	"Tog jeg fejl"	Christian Have (1978, as member of Mabel)	—N/a
5	Sanne Graulund and Ole Kibsgaard	"Et øje på dig"	Gry Johansen (1983)	—N/a
6	Johnny Hansen	"Lidt efter lidt"	Birthe Kjær (1989)	—N/a
7	Basix	"I Australien"	Lotte Nilsson (1992, together with Kenny Lübcke)	Advanced
8	Anne Murillo	"Hvis du tænker lidt på mig"	Bjørn Tidmand (1964)	Advanced
9	Helge Engelbrecht	"Som om det var i går"	Anne-Cathrine Herdorf (1987)	Advanced
10	Rollo & King	"Der står et billede af dig på mit bord"	Michael Teschl & Trine Jepsen (1999)	Advanced

Superfinal – 17 February 2001
R/O	Artist	Song	Jury	Public	Total	Place
1	Katrine Daugaard	"Sha la li sha la lej"	4	24	28	5
2	Basix	"I Australien"	12	30	42	2
3	Anne Murillo	"Hvis du tænker lidt på mig"	6	32	38	3
4	Helge Engelbrecht	"Som om det var i går"	8	26	34	4
5	Rollo & King	"Der står et billede af dig på mit bord"	10	46	58	1

Detailed Regional Televoting Results
Song	Zealand and Islands	Jutland	Funen	Capital Region	Total
"Sha la li sha la lej"	10	4	4	6	24
"I Australien"	4	8	10	8	30
"Hvis du tænker lidt på mig"	8	6	8	10	32
"Som om det var i går"	6	10	6	4	26
"Der står et billede af dig på mit bord"	12	12	12	12	46

== At Eurovision ==
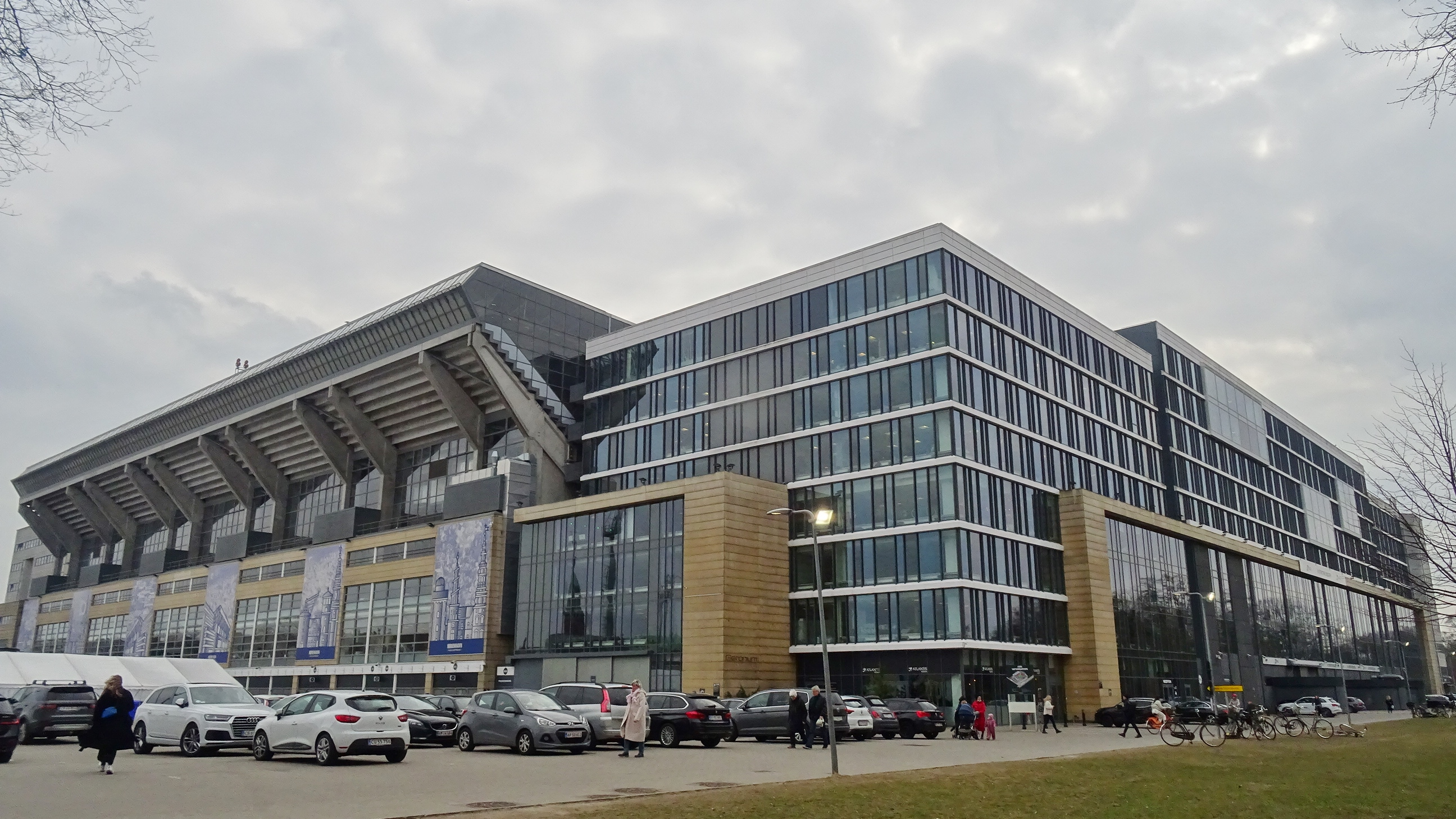
The Eurovision Song Contest 2001 took place at Parken Stadium in Copenhagen, Denmark.

The Eurovision Song Contest 2001 took place at Parken Stadium in Copenhagen, Denmark, on 12 May 2001. The relegation rules introduced for the 1997 contest were again utilised ahead of the 2001 contest, based on each country's average points total in previous contests. The 23 participants were made up of the host country, the "Big Four" (France, Germany, Spain and the United Kingdom), and the 12 countries with the highest average scores between the 1996 and 2000 contests competed in the final. On 21 November 2000, an allocation draw was held which determined the running order and the Netherlands was close the show and perform in position 23, following the entry from Greece. At the contest, Rollo & King performed the English version of "Der står et billede af dig på mit bord", titled "Never Ever Let You Go". Denmark finished in second place with 177 points.

The show was broadcast on DR1 (with commentary by Hans Otto Bisgaard and Hilda Heick) and on radio station DR P3. The contest was watched by a total of 2.6 million viewers in Denmark with the market share of 95%.

=== Voting ===
Below is a breakdown of points awarded to Denmark and awarded by Denmark in the contest. The nation awarded its 12 points to Malta in the contest.

DR appointed Gry Johansen, who represented Denmark in the 1983 contest, as its spokesperson to announce the Danish jury's votes.

Points awarded to Denmark
Score	Country
12 points	Croatia; Estonia; Germany; Iceland; Ireland; Norway
10 points	Latvia; Netherlands; Slovenia; Sweden; United Kingdom
8 points	Portugal
7 points	Israel; Poland; Spain
6 points	Greece; Lithuania; Malta
5 points	
4 points	France; Turkey
3 points	
2 points	
1 point	

Points awarded by Denmark
Score	Country
12 points	Malta
10 points	Sweden
8 points	Estonia
7 points	Bosnia and Herzegovina
6 points	France
5 points	Greece
4 points	Germany
3 points	Turkey
2 points	Iceland
1 point	Poland
