= Turkey in the Eurovision Song Contest 2001 =

- Eurovision Song Contest 2001
- Participating broadcaster: Turkish Radio and Television Corporation (TRT)
- Country: Turkey
- Selection process: 24. Eurovision Şarkı Yarışması Türkiye Finali
- Selection date: 23 February 2001

Competing entry
- Song: "Sevgiliye Son"
- Artist: Sedat Yüce
- Songwriters: Semih Güneri; Nurdan Güneri; Figen Çakmak

Placement
- Final result: 11th, 41 points

Participation chronology

Turkey was represented at the Eurovision Song Contest 2001 with the song "Sevgiliye Son", composed by Semih Güneri, with lyrics by Figen Çakmak and Nurdan Güneri, and performed by Sedat Yüce. The Turkish participating broadcaster, the Turkish Radio and Television Corporation (TRT), selected its entry through a national final.

== Before Eurovision ==
=== 24. Eurovision Şarkı Yarışması Türkiye Finali ===
The Turkish Radio and Television Corporation (TRT) held the national final on 23 February 2001 at its television studios in Ankara, hosted by Ömer Önder and Meltem Ersan. Ten songs competed and the winner was determined by an expert jury.

Final – 23 February 2001
R/O	Artist	Song	Songwriter(s)	Place
1	Özgür Yedievli	"Yalnızım"	Özgür Yedievli	—
2	Feryal Başel	"Oysa Şimdi"	İhsan Köseoğlu	3
3	Nurdoğan Yurtseven	"Delicesine"	Nurdoğan Yurtseven	—
4	Grup GMG	"Sen Her Şeyimsin"	Canan Çitoğlu, Erdinç Tunç	—
5	Ceynur Biçer	"Kayıp Bir Melek"	Tolga Gürdil	2
6	Semih Bayraktar	"Çok Geç"	Semih Bayraktar	—
7	Sedat Yüce	"Sevgiliye Son"	Figen Çakmak, Nurdan Güneri, Semih Güneri	1
8	Işın Karaca	"Kaderimsin"	Canan Çitoğlu, Erdinç Tunç	—
9	Semih Bayraktar	"Uyan kalbim"	Semih Bayraktar	—
10	Ceynur Biçer	"Hep Aşk Olsun"	Tolga Gürdil	—

== At Eurovision ==
On the evening of the contest Sedat Yüce performed 15th in the running order following France and preceding United Kingdom. At the close of the voting "Sevgiliye Son" had received 41 points placing Turkey 11th.

=== Voting ===
Below is a breakdown of points awarded to and by Turkey in the contest. The nation awarded its 12 points to Estonia in the contest. TRT appointed Meltem Ersan Yazgan as its spokesperson to announce the results of the Turkish jury.

Points awarded to Turkey
Score	Country
12 points	
10 points	Greece
8 points	
7 points	Croatia; France; Germany
6 points	
5 points	
4 points	Malta
3 points	Denmark; Netherlands
2 points	
1 point	

Points awarded by Turkey
Score	Country
12 points	Estonia
10 points	Croatia
8 points	Sweden
7 points	Israel
6 points	Spain
5 points	Greece
4 points	Denmark
3 points	Germany
2 points	Malta
1 point	France
