= Alenka Godec =

Slovenian jazz and pop singer (born 1964)

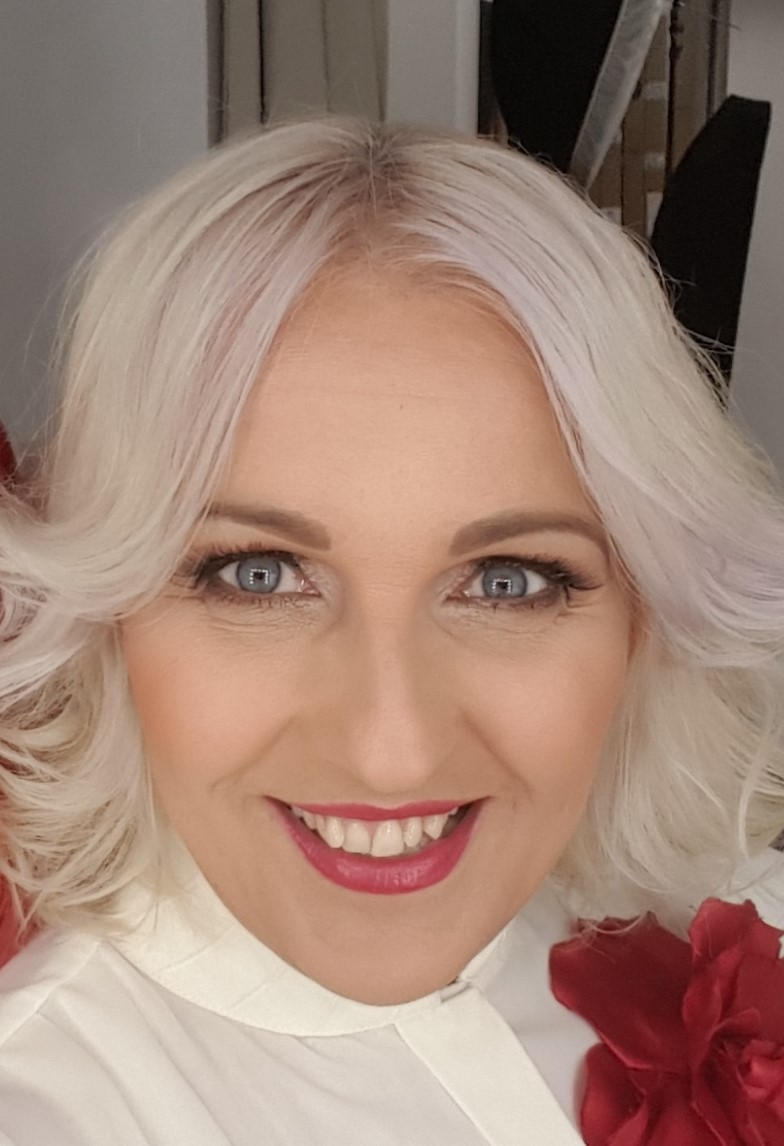

Background information
- Born: Alenka Godec; 5 November 1964 (age 61); Ljubljana, SR Slovenia
- Genres: Jazz, Pop.
- Occupations: Singer, Songwriter

Alenka Godec (born 5 November 1964, in Ljubljana) is a Slovenian jazz and pop singer.

== Albums Trova ==
Year	Albums
1992	Tvoja
1995	Prebujena
1997	Čas zaceli rane
2000	Vse ob pravem času
2002	V meni je moč
2005	Mesto sanj
2008	So najlepše pesmi že napisane
2009	So najlepše pesmi že napisane (special edition)
2014	S kotički ust navzgor

== Festivals ==
=== Pop workshop ===
- 1988: Tvoja - member of the group Cafe (1. audience award, award of the expert commission, award for the most promising group)
- 1989: Drugačna (Tomaž Kozlevčar - Shan von Greier - Tomaž Kozlevčar) - a member of the group Cafe (award for best lyrics)
- 1990: Zahvala - a member of the group Capuccino (2. award of the expert commission)
- 1992: Sanje (Sašo Fajon - Primož Peterca) (award for the best performance nagrada za najboljši nastop or interpretation, 2. award of the expert commission )

=== Vesela jesen - Happy autumn ===
- 1992: Na vrh Triglava čolnič plava (Oto Pestner – Dare Hering – Tomaž Kozlevčar) - with the group New Swimg Quartet (award for the arrangement, award for nagrada za aranžma, award for the performance, 2. award for the lyrics; 3. audience award )

=== EMA ===
- 1993: Tisti si ti (Matjaž Murko - Miša Čermak - Milan Ferlež, Jože Hauko) - 3. place (81 points)
- 2001: Če verjameš ali ne (Aleš Klinar - Alenka Godec, Anja Rupel - Aleš Klinar, Aleš Čadež) - 3. place(20 points)
- 2003: Poglej me v oči (Aleš Klinar - Alenka Godec, Anja Rupel - Aleš Klinar, Aleš Čadež) - 3. place (12.261 votes)
- 2006: Hočem stran (Aleš Klinar - Alenka Godec, Anja Rupel - Aleš Klinar, Franci Zabukovec) - 11. place (7 points)

=== Melodije morja in sonca - Melodies of the sea and sun ===
- 1992: Novo sonce (Primož Peterca - Primož Peterca)
- 1993: Zdaj se vračam (M. Murko – Miša Čermak – Primož Grašič)
- 1997: Čas zaceli rane (Janez Bončina − Janez Bončina − Primož Grašič) - The prize of the international professional jury of authorship, 3. audience award
- 1998: Če se bojiš neba (Marino Legovič - Drago Mislej - Marino Legovič) (z Davorjem Petrašem) - Award of the jury for the arrangement
- 2002: Raje mi priznaj (Aleš Klinar - Alenka Godec, Anja Rupel - Aleš Klinar, Aleš Čadež) - Award of the professional jury for the best performance, 2nd prize of the audience
- 2004: V dobrem in slabem (Aleš Klinar - Alenka Godec, Anja Rupel - Aleš Klinar) - Award of the professional jury for the best song as a whole, award of the professional jury for the best performance, award of the professional jury for the best overall image, 5th place
- 2013: Vse je ljubezen (Aleš Klinar - Alenka Godec, Anja Rupel - Aleš Klinar, Miha Gorše) - Award of the professional jury for the best music, 2nd place(28 points)

=== Slovenska popevka ===
- 1998: Bodi luč (Oto Pestner - Božidar Hering - Tomaž Kozlevčar) - Award of the professional jury for the best performance
- 2001: Sreča (Blaž Jurjevčič - Alenka Godec - Lojze Krajnčan)
- 2004: Rada bi znova poletela (Aleš Klinar - Alenka Godec, Anja Rupel - Rok Golob) - 3rd audience award (2.294 telephone votes)
- 2007: Boljša kot prej (Miran Juvan - Anastazija Juvan - Patrik Greblo) - Award of the professional jury for the best performer, 11th place (360 telephone votes)

=== Hit festival ===
- 2001: V meni je moč (Aleš Klinar - Alenka Godec, Anja Rupel) - 1st place, 1st prize for the best track, 1st prize for the best text, award for best performance
- 2002: Ni me strah (Aleš Klinar - Alenka Godec, Anja Rupel)- 1st place, 3rd prize of the jury for the lyrics

In 2007, she was a member of the election commission at "Emma 07", who chose songs for a musical festival.
