= Estonia in the Eurovision Song Contest 2001 =

- Eurovision Song Contest 2001
- Participating broadcaster: Eesti Televisioon (ETV)
- Country: Estonia
- Selection process: Eurolaul 2001
- Selection date: 3 February 2001

Competing entry
- Song: "Everybody"
- Artist: Tanel Padar, Dave Benton, and 2XL
- Songwriters: Ivar Must; Maian Kärmas

Placement
- Final result: 1st, 198 points

Participation chronology

Estonia was represented at the Eurovision Song Contest 2001 with the song "Everybody", composed by Ivar Must, with lyrics by Maian Kärmas, and performed by Tanel Padar, Dave Benton, and the group 2XL. The Estonian participating broadcaster, Eesti Televisioon (ETV), organised the national final Eurolaul 2001 in order to select its entry for the contest. Eight songs competed in the national final and "Everybody" performed by Tanel Padar, Dave Benton, and 2XL was selected as the winner by a jury panel.

Estonia competed in the Eurovision Song Contest which took place on 12 May 2001. Performing during the show in position 20, Estonia placed first out of the 23 participating countries, winning the contest with 198 points. This was Estonia's first win in the Eurovision Song Contest.

== Background ==
Prior to the 2001 contest, Eesti Televisioon (ETV) had participated in the Eurovision Song Contest representing Estonia six times since its first entry in 1994. Its best result in the contest was fourth, which was achieved in 2000 with the song "Once in a Lifetime" performed by Ines.

As part of its duties as participating broadcaster, ETV organises the selection of its entry in the Eurovision Song Contest and broadcasts the event in the country. Since its debut, the broadcaster has organised national finals that feature a competition among multiple artists and songs in order to select its entry for the contest. ETV has organised the Eurolaul competition since 1996 in order to select its entry, and on 10 November 2000, it announced the organisation of Eurolaul 2001 in order to select its 2001 entry.

== Before Eurovision ==
=== Eurolaul 2001 ===
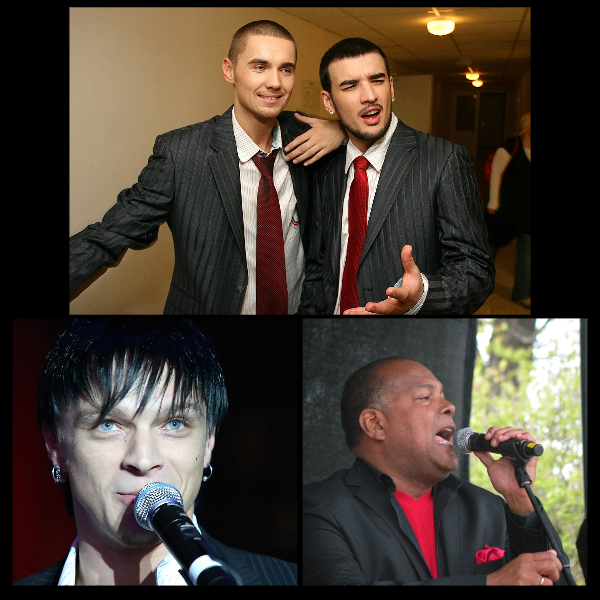
Tanel Padar (bottom left), Dave Benton (bottom right) and 2XL (top) were selected to represent Estonia in the Eurovision Song Contest 2001 following their victory at Eurolaul 2001

Eurolaul 2001 was the eighth edition of the national selection Eurolaul organised by ETV to select its entry for the Eurovision Song Contest 2001. The competition consisted of an eight-song final on 3 February 2001 held at the ETV studios in Tallinn, hosted by Marko Reikop and Ilo-Mai Küttim "Elektra" and broadcast on ETV.

==== Competing entries ====
On 10 November 2000, ETV opened the submission period for artists and composers to submit their entries up until 12 December 2000. A record 80 submissions were received by the deadline—breaking the previous record of 53, set during the 1993 edition. A 10-member jury panel selected eight finalists from the submissions and the selected songs were announced on 13 December 2000. Maian Kärmas and Maiken (member of Soul Control) have both competed in previous editions of Eurolaul. The selection jury consisted of Priit Hõbemägi (culture critic), Jaan Karp (musician), Tõnu Kõrvits (composer), Ivo Linna (singer), Maido Maadik (Eesti Raadio sound engineer), Olavi Pihlamägi (journalist), Allan Roosileht (Raadio 2 music editor), Evelin Samuel (singer), Aarne Saluveer (choir conductor) and Anu Tali (conductor).

Artist	Song	Songwriter(s)
Hillar Vimberg	"Cat Story"	Hillar Vimberg
Iris	"Sounds of the Sea"	Imre Sooäär, Kersti Kuusk
Kadi Toom	"A Little Chance"	Maian Kärmas, Priit Pajusaar, Glen Pilvre
Liisi Koikson	"Someday"	Kelli Uustani, Jüri Salumäe
Maian Kärmas	"The Right Way"	Maian Kärmas
Soul Control	"Life Is a Beautiful Word"	Sven Lõhmus
Tanel Padar, Dave Benton and 2XL	"Everybody"	Ivar Must, Maian Kärmas
Yvetta Raid	"Smile"	Kristina-Maria Laur, Risto Laur

==== Final ====
The final took place on 3 February 2001. Eight songs competed during the show and a jury selected "Everybody" performed by Tanel Padar, Dave Benton and 2XL as the winner. A non-competitive public televote registered 19,261 votes and selected Tanel Padar, Dave Benton and 2XL as the winner. The jury panel that voted in the final consisted of Anders Berglund (Swedish composer and conductor), Manfred Witt (music, show and entertainment producer of the German broadcaster NDR), Moshe Datz (Israeli composer and singer), Linda Martin (Irish singer), Marlain Angelidou (Cypriot singer), Michael Leggo (British director and producer), Jørgen Olsen (Danish singer-songwriter) and Björgvin Halldórsson (Icelandic singer).

Final – 3 February 2001
R/O	Artist	Song	Jury Votes								Total	Place
R/O	Artist	Song	A. Berglund	M. Witt	M. Datz	L. Martin	M. Angelidou	M. Leggo	J. Olsen	B. Halldórsson	Total	Place
1	Soul Control	"Life Is a Beautiful Word"	10	5	8	10	5	6	10	6	60	5
2	Iris	"Sounds of the Sea"	5	6	6	7	10	12	6	10	62	4
3	Maian Kärmas	"The Right Way"	7	7	7	5	8	4	8	5	51	6
4	Hillar Vimberg	"Cat Story"	4	3	5	3	3	3	5	3	29	8
5	Kadi Toom	"A Little Chance"	6	8	10	8	6	7	12	7	64	3
6	Yvetta Raid	"Smile"	3	4	3	4	4	5	4	4	31	7
7	Tanel Padar, Dave Benton and 2XL	"Everybody"	12	12	12	6	12	8	3	12	77	1
8	Liisi Koikson	"Someday"	8	10	4	12	7	10	7	8	66	2

== At Eurovision ==
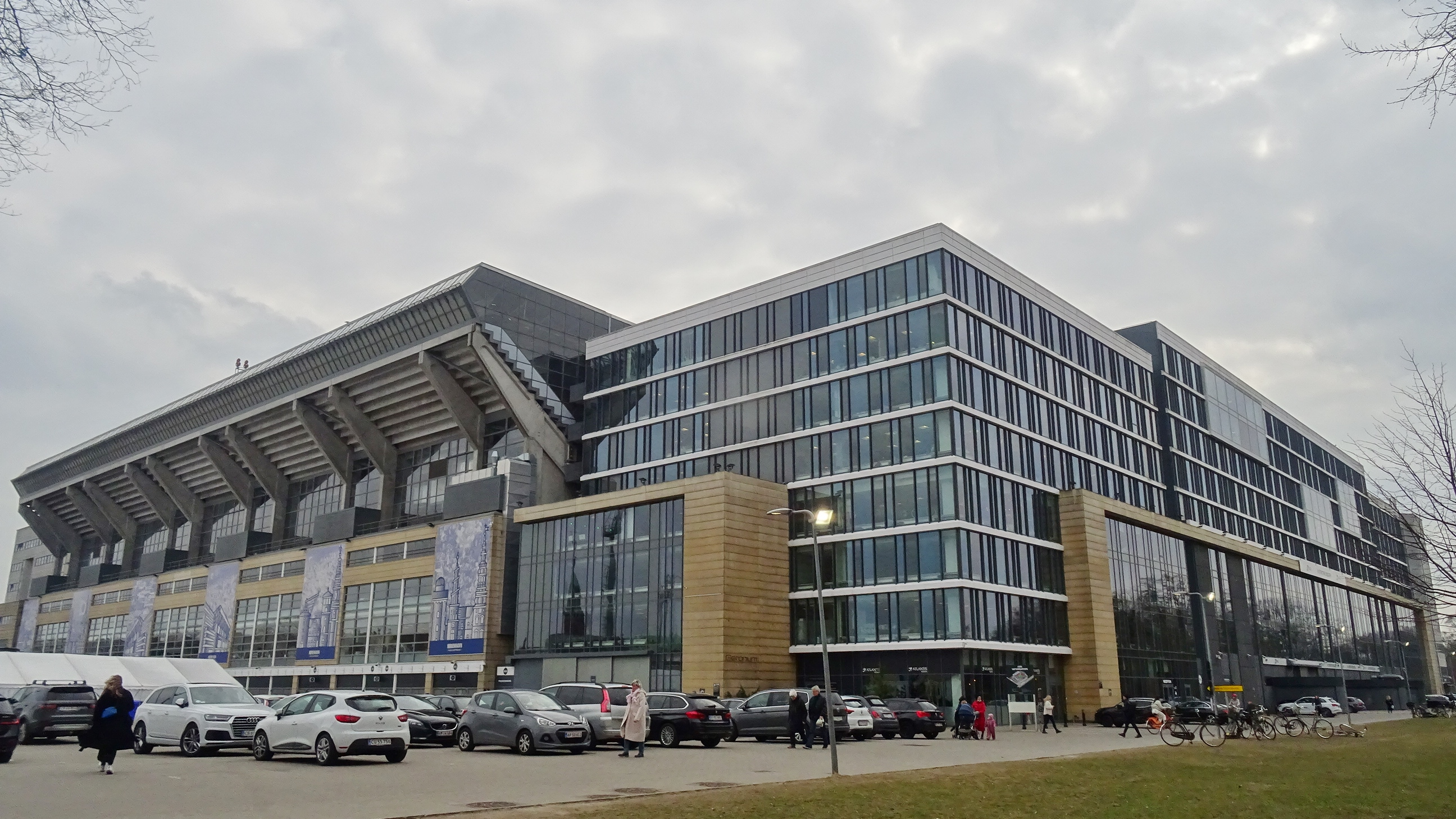
The Eurovision Song Contest 2001 took place at Parken Stadium in Copenhagen, Denmark.

The Eurovision Song Contest 2001 took place at Parken Stadium in Copenhagen, Denmark, on 12 May 2001. The relegation rules introduced for the 1997 contest were again utilised ahead of the 2001 contest, based on each country's average points total in previous contests. The 23 participants were made up of the host country, the "Big Four" (France, Germany, Spain, and the United Kingdom), the 12 countries with the highest average scores between the 1996 and 2000 contests, and the 6 countries previously relegated in 2000. On 21 November 2000, an allocation draw was held which determined the running order and Iceland was set to perform in position 20, following the entry from Germany and before the entry from Malta. Estonia won the contest placing first with a score of 198 points, which marked the nation's first victory in the Eurovision Song Contest.

The contest was broadcast on ETV, with commentary by Marko Reikop. ETV appointed Ilo-Mai Küttim "Elektra" as its spokesperson to announce the results of the Estonian televote during the show.

=== Voting ===
Below is a breakdown of points awarded to Estonian and awarded by Estonian in the contest. The nation awarded its 12 points to Denmark in the contest.

Points awarded to Estonia
Score	Country
12 points	Greece; Latvia; Lithuania; Malta; Netherlands; Poland; Slovenia; Turkey; United Kingdom
10 points	Germany; Iceland; Ireland; Norway
8 points	Denmark; France; Spain; Sweden
7 points	
6 points	Israel; Russia
5 points	
4 points	Bosnia and Herzegovina
3 points	
2 points	Croatia
1 point	

Points awarded by Estonia
Score	Country
12 points	Denmark
10 points	France
8 points	Latvia
7 points	Sweden
6 points	Greece
5 points	Slovenia
4 points	Russia
3 points	Spain
2 points	Malta
1 point	Germany
