= Plava Trava Zaborava =

- Origin: Croatia
- Genres: Country
- Years active: 1982 - present
- Labels: Jugoton, ZKP RTLJ
- Members: Eduard Jimmy Matešic; Davor Rodik; Dragutin Smokrovic - Smokva; Rista Ibrić
- Past members: Branko Bogunović; Vladimir Georgev; Rajka Sutlovic; Hrvoje Galekovic; Zlatan Živkovic Goran Vukorepa "Vuk"

Plava Trava Zaborava (English: Blue Grass of Oblivion) is a country and western band formed in Zagreb, Croatia in 1982. The band members are from Croatia and one member is from Serbia. So far, they have sold more than 500,000 album copies.

The group was formed at the advisory of Dražen Vrdoljak, a music critic and journalist from Split. The band was the first to explore in country and western music in Yugoslavia at the time. They first held concerts in Europe, mainly in country and western festivals. The world encyclopedia of country and western music issued by Virgin in 1998, the same year the Dutch Country and Western Federation was added to the third best performers live in the world.

In addition to original songs, the band performed covers of domestic hits and original works. The songs were written by Eduard Jimmy Matešić, and they have successfully cooperated with many local and international artists, authors and musicians.

== Discography ==
- Live! (1984)
- Country (1985)
- Hat trick (1987)
- Dance all night - live (1988)
- Plava trava zaborava (1990)
- Muddy river blues (1996)
- I to sam ja (1997)
- 16 nam je godina tek (1998)
- Ultimate collection (2009)
