= Greece in the Eurovision Song Contest 2001 =

- Eurovision Song Contest 2001
- Participating broadcaster: Hellenic Broadcasting Corporation (ERT)
- Country: Greece
- Selection process: Ellinikós Telikós 2001
- Selection date: 6 March 2001

Competing entry
- Song: "Die for You"
- Artist: Antique
- Songwriters: Nikos Terzis; Antonis Pappas

Placement
- Final result: 3rd, 147 points

Participation chronology

Greece was represented at the Eurovision Song Contest 2001 with the song "Die for You", composed by Nikos Terzis, with lyrics by Antonis Pappas, and performed by Antique. The Greek participating broadcaster, the Hellenic Broadcasting Corporation (ERT), organised a public selection process entitled Ellinikós Telikós 2001 to determine its entry for the contest. Held on 6 March 2001 in Athens, the event saw nine songs compete to be the Greek entry; the results were determined by a combination of jury and televoting. The song "Die for You" performed by Antique received the most votes and was selected to represent the nation. Greece performed 22nd out of the 23 countries competing in the contest and placed third with 147 points, marking their highest placement in the annual event to this point.

== Background ==
The Hellenic Broadcasting Corporation (ERT) is a full member of the European Broadcasting Union (EBU), thus eligible to participate in the Eurovision Song Contest representing Greece. Prior to the 2001 contest, Greece had participated 21 times since its debut entry in 1974. By 2001, its best result was fifth place which was achieved twice: in 1977 with the song "Mathima solfege" performed by the band Paschalis, Marianna, Robert and Bessy and in 1992 with "Olou tou kosmou i Elpida" performed by Cleopatra. Greece's least successful result was in 1998 when it placed 20th with the song "Mia krifi evaisthisia" by Thalassa, receiving only twelve points in total, all from Cyprus. Following this result, Greece was relegated from participation in 1999 contest, and ERT decided not to take part in 2000 contest, citing financial problems.

== Before Eurovision ==
=== Ellinikós Telikós 2001 ===
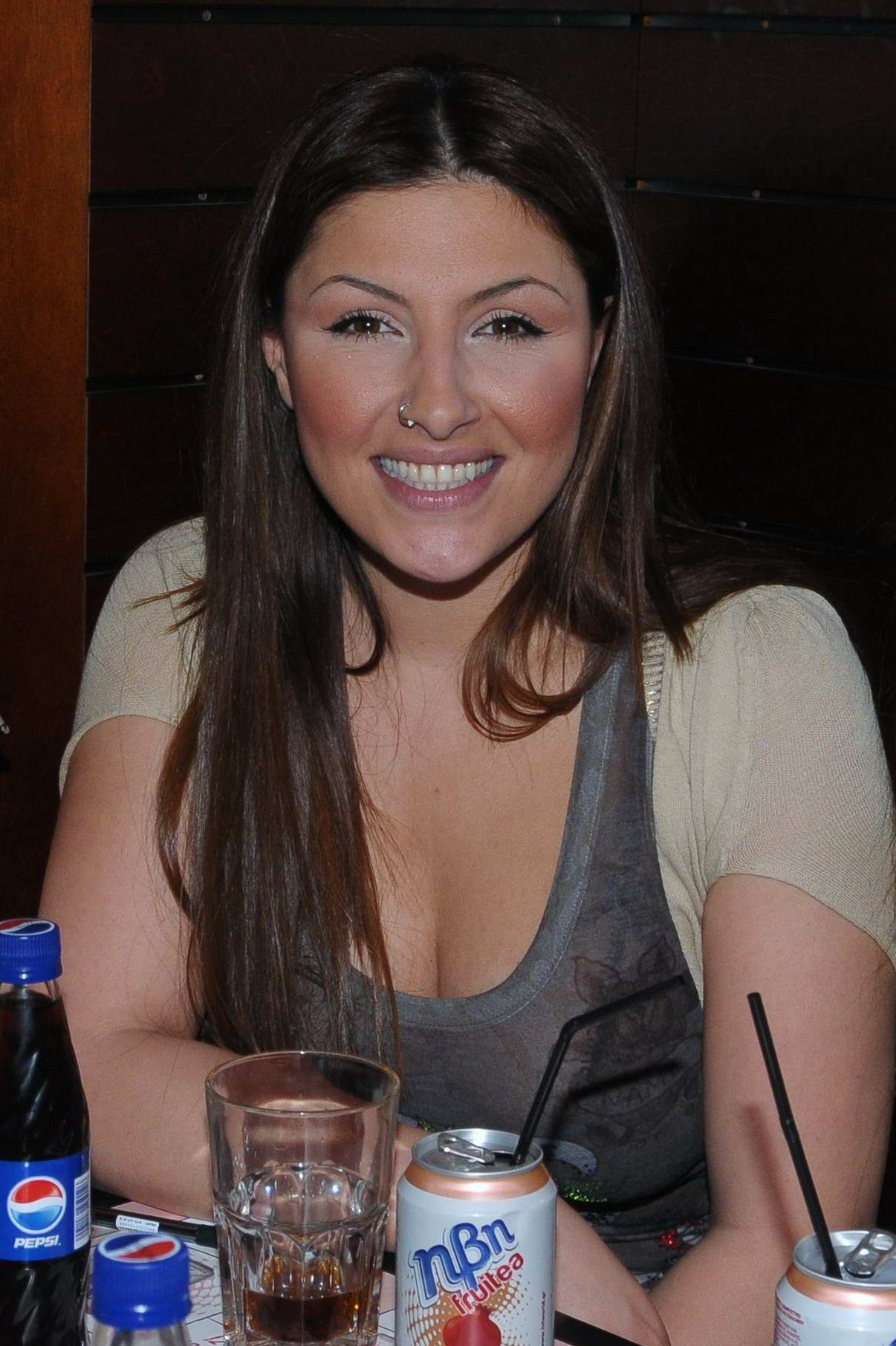
Helena Paparizou (pictured in 2010) alongside Nikos Panagiotidis formed Antique, the band selected to represent Greece.

The Greek final Ellinikós Telikós 2001 took place on 6 March 2001 at the REX Music Hall in Athens, Greece, hosted by Dafni Bokota and televised on ET1. Greek citizens submitted 135 songs for consideration by ERT's 29 December 2000 deadline, from which ten were selected to participate. Nama, with the song "Tha gyrno" (Θα γυρνώ), was announced as one of the ten competing entries, but did not take part in the event. The remaining nine songs competed over two rounds of voting. After the first round, consisting of all nine candidate entries, jury voting selected four to proceed to the second round. The winner of the event was then selected by a 50/50 combination of jury voting and public televoting through OTE. The jury consisted of Lakis Papadopoulos, Sinia Kousoula, Alexis Kostalas, Evi Droutsa, Nikos Mouratidis, Lefteris Koggalidis, and George Katsaros. During the voting phase, video clips of previous Greek Eurovision entries were shown, including "Krasi, thalassa ke t'agori mou" by Marinella (1974), "Mathima solfege" by Paschalis, Marianna, Robert and Bessy (1977), "Charlie Chaplin" by Tania Tsanaklidou (1978), "Sokratie" by Elpida (1979), "Autostop" by Anna Vissi and the Epikouri (1980), "Stop" by Bang (1987), "I anixi" by Sophia Vossou (1991), "Olou tou kosmou i Elpida" by Cleopatra (1992), and "Ellada, hora tou fotos" by Katy Garbi (1993).

When the combined results were being presented, it was revealed that "Die for You" by Antique and "One More Time" by Kay Connors had received the same score. As there was a tie for first place, the results of the public vote took precedence and led to the victory of Antique. The results of the national final were contested, with media noting public and fellow contestants' accusations that Antique may have bribed the jury, a claim they called false. Most of the audience as well as the other performers left before Antique's encore performance of their winning song. In response, Antique-member Helena Paparizou remarked that bribing the jury would be difficult given that they are a Sweden-based group with few Greek contacts. Her bandmate Nikos Panagiotidis added that they received nearly half the viewer votes, casting doubt on the impact that fixing the jury would have. ERT president George Katsaros then reiterated that Antique were the winners because "they take more votes from any other and the voters want them".

First Round – 6 March 2001
R/O	Artist	Song	Songwriter(s)	Result
1	Antique	"Die for You"	Nikos Terzis, Antonis Pappas	Advanced
2	Lenou	"S'efharisto" (Σ'ευχάριστο)	Lenou Petsila, Aris Davarakis	Advanced
3	Sissy Bitzou	"To koritsaki tou bampa" (Το κοριτσάκι του μπαμπά)	Giannis Stinkas	—N/a
4	Maria-Louiza Vassilopoulou	"Agapise me" (Αγάπησε με)	Maria-Louiza Vassilopoulou, Christos Soumkas	Advanced
5	Maria Karagouni and Thanasis Dimopoulos	"Me ta matia tis psychis" (Με τα ματια της ψυχής)	Ioannis Panagiotopoulos	—N/a
6	Lorna	"Zoi, s'agapao" (Ζωή, σ'αγαπάω)	Giorgos Despotidis, Dimitris Brouchos	—N/a
7	Tzina Fotinopoulou	"Killed Angels"	Giannis Tsiliminkras, Eleni Barmpakou, Rita Vazou	—N/a
8	Kay Connors	"One More Time"	Replete Bros	Advanced
9	Dimitris Laskaridis	"Santorini"	Dimitris Laskaridis	—N/a

Second Round – 6 March 2001
R/O	Artist	Song	Jury	Televote		Total	Place
R/O	Artist	Song	Jury	Percentage	Points	Total	Place
1	Antique	"Die for You"	3	45%	4	7	1
2	Lenou	"S'efharisto"	2	12%	1	3	4
3	Maria-Louiza Vassilopoulou	"Agapise me"	1	13%	2	3	3
4	Kay Connors	"One More Time"	4	30%	3	7	2

== At Eurovision ==
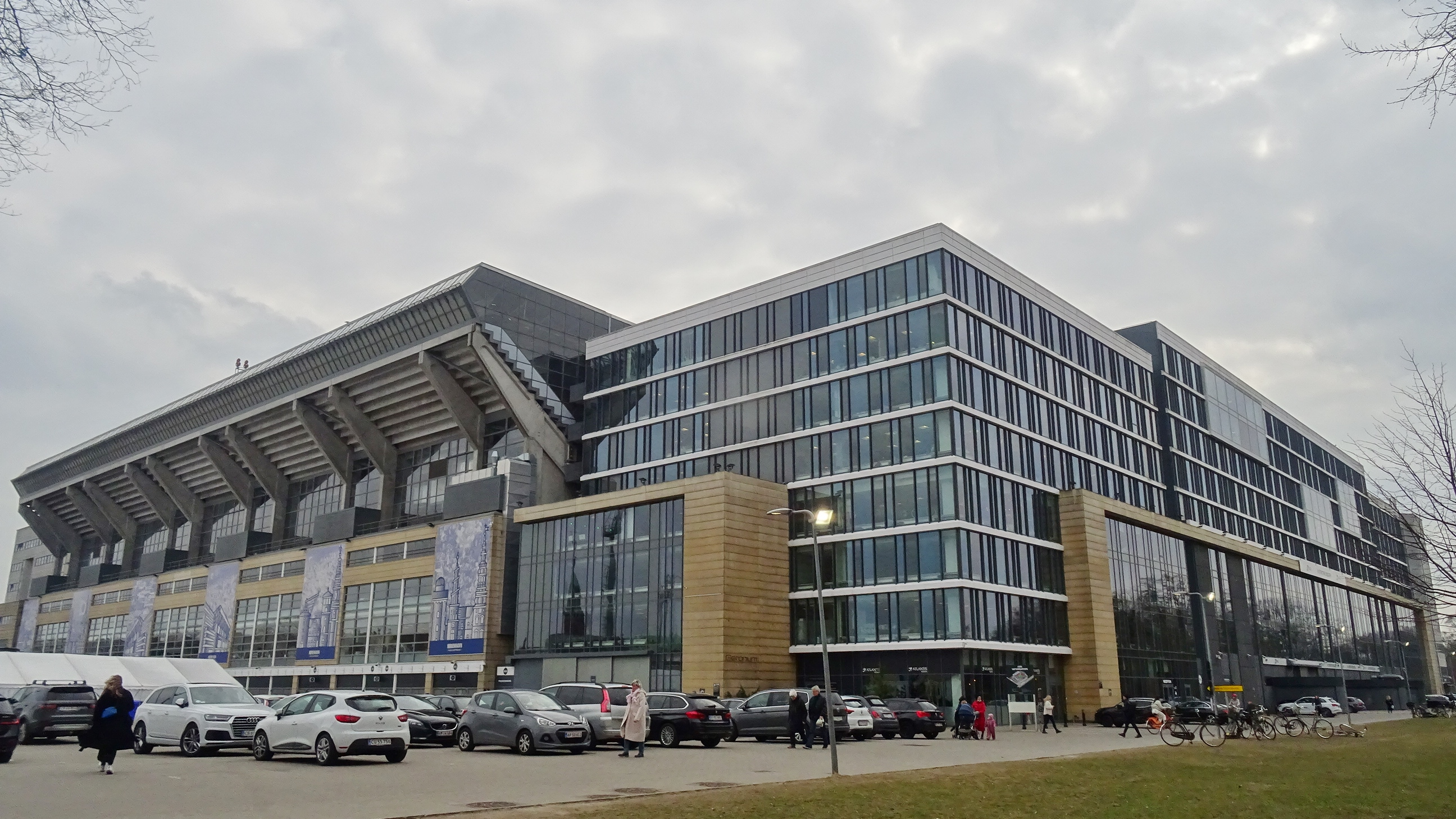
The Eurovision Song Contest 2001 took place at Parken Stadium in Copenhagen, Denmark.

The Eurovision Song Contest 2001 took place at Parken Stadium in Copenhagen, Denmark, on 12 May 2001. The relegation rules introduced for the 1997 contest were again utilised ahead of the 2001 contest, based on each country's average points total in previous contests. The 23 participants were made up of the previous year's winning country, the "Big Four" countries, consisting of France, Germany, Spain and the United Kingdom, the twelve countries which had obtained the highest average points total over the preceding five contests, and any eligible countries which did not compete in the 2000 contest. As Greece was absent from the 2000 contest, it was permitted to participate this year. Bokota provided commentary for the broadcast within Greece, a task she had performed for ERT since the 1999 contest.

Antique took part in rehearsals for their performance during the week of 7–12 May 2001, which concluded with the final dress rehearsal on 12 May where the professional juries of each country watched and voted on the competing entries. "Die for You" was performed 22nd in the field of 23 competing nations on the evening of 12 May, following Malta and preceding Denmark. Marina Kereklidou served as costume designer for Antique; Paparizou appeared in a white tight-fitting leather outfit with matching rhinestone belt. The contest performance was a relatively static affair, with both singers as well as the backing vocalists standing in front of microphones to sing. While the contest had by this point embraced pre-recorded music, Panagiotidis performed with a traditional Greek instrument throughout. At the close of voting, it had received 147 points, placing third, behind winners Estonia and host country Denmark. The third-place finish was the best result Greece had achieved to this point, and remained so until the 2005 contest, when Paparizou performed as a solo artist, and won the contest.

=== Voting ===
Voting during the show involved each country awarding points from 1–8, 10 and 12 as determined by either 100% televoting or a combination of 50% televoting and 50% national jury. In cases where televoting was not possible, only the votes of the eight-member national juries were tabulated. Greece received 147 points, which included the top 12 points from Spain and Sweden, with nearly 28% of Swedish voters casting their vote for the nation. The nation awarded its 12 points to contest winners Estonia. Alexis Kostalas was the Greek spokesperson announcing the country's voting results during the show, a task he had performed since the 1998 contest. The tables below visualise a complete breakdown of the points awarded to and awarded by Greece in the Eurovision Song Contest 2001.

Points awarded to Greece
Score	Country
12 points	Spain; Sweden
10 points	Israel
8 points	Bosnia and Herzegovina; Germany; Iceland; Norway; Poland; Slovenia
7 points	Malta; United Kingdom
6 points	Estonia; Netherlands
5 points	Croatia; Denmark; Ireland; Lithuania; Russia; Turkey
4 points	Portugal
3 points	France
2 points	Latvia
1 point	

Points awarded by Greece
Score	Country
12 points	Estonia
10 points	Turkey
8 points	Spain
7 points	Croatia
6 points	Denmark
5 points	Russia
4 points	France
3 points	Malta
2 points	Israel
1 point	Germany
