= Latvia in the Eurovision Song Contest 2001 =

- Eurovision Song Contest 2001
- Participating broadcaster: Latvijas Televīzija (LTV)
- Country: Latvia
- Selection process: Eirodziesma 2001
- Selection date: 24 February 2001

Competing entry
- Song: "Too Much"
- Artist: Arnis Mednis
- Songwriters: Arnis Mednis; Gustavs Terzens

Placement
- Final result: 18th, 16 points

Participation chronology

Latvia was represented at the Eurovision Song Contest 2001 with the song "Too Much", written by Arnis Mednis and Gustavs Terzens, and performed by Arnis Mednis himself. The Latvian participating broadcaster, Latvijas Televīzija (LTV), organised the national final Eirodziesma 2001 in order to select its entry for the contest. Ten songs were selected to compete in the national final on 24 February 2001 where a public televote and four thematical jury groups selected "Too Much" performed by Arnis Mednis as the winner.

Latvia competed in the Eurovision Song Contest which took place on 12 May 2001. Performing during the show in position 9, Latvia placed eighteenth out of the 23 participating countries, scoring 16 points.

== Background ==
Prior to the 2001 contest, Latvijas Televīzija (LTV) had participated in the Eurovision Song Contest representing Latvia once, with the song "My Star" performed by Brainstorm which placed 3rd. As part of its duties as participating broadcaster, LTV organises the selection of its entry in the Eurovision Song Contest and broadcasts the event in the country. The broadcaster has selected its entry in 2000 through the national selection show Eirodziesma, a selection procedure that was continued in order to select its entry for the 2001 contest.

== Before Eurovision ==
=== Eirodziesma 2001 ===
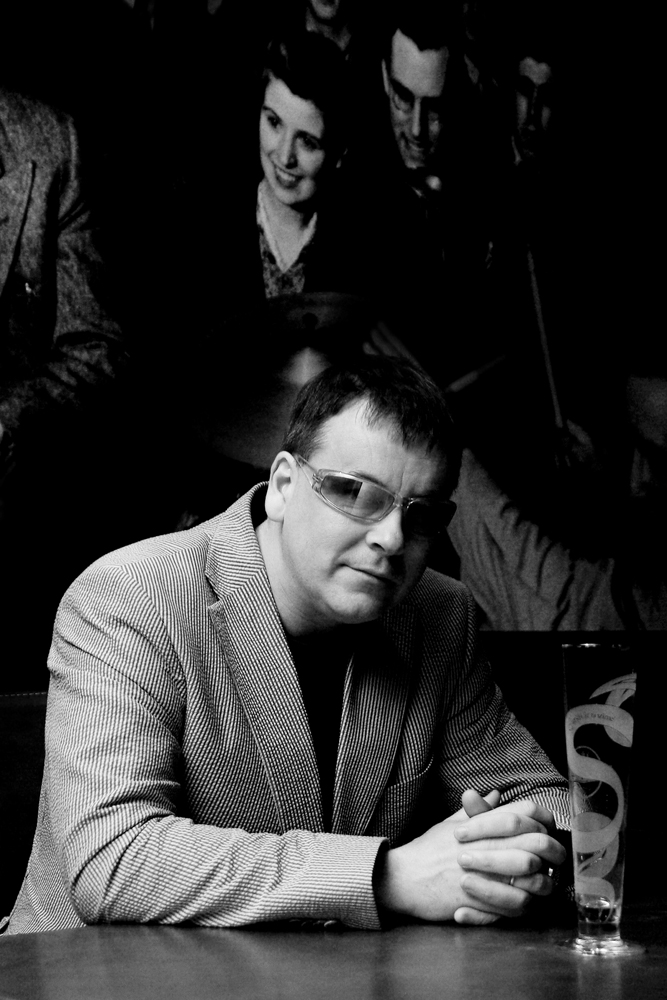
Arnis Mednis (pictured in 2008) went on to represent Latvia in the 2001 contest.

Eirodziesma 2001 was the second edition of Eirodziesma, the music competition organised by LTV to selects its entry for the Eurovision Song Contest. 45 entries were submitted for the competition following the submission deadline on 11 December 2000 and a jury panel appointed by LTV selected ten entries. The ten competing artists and songs were announced during an introductory show that was broadcast on 27 January 2001.

LTV held the national final at its television studios in Zaķusala, Riga on 24 February 2001, hosted by Horens Stalbe and Dita Torstere and broadcast on LTV1 as well as online via the broadcaster's Eurovision Song Contest website eirovizija.tv.lv. The song with the highest number of votes based on the combination of votes from four thematical jury groups (4/5) and the Latvian public (1/5), "Too Much" performed by Arnis Mednis, was declared the winner.

R/O	Artist	Song	Songwriter(s)	Jury	Televote		Total	Place
R/O	Artist	Song	Songwriter(s)	Jury	Votes	Points	Total	Place
1	Linda Leen and Lauris Reiniks	"I Wish I Knew"	Lauris Reiniks	32	12,463	8	40	2
2	Tumsa	"It's Not the End"	Mārtiņš Freimanis	32	8,520	4	36	4
3	Madara Celma and Kristaps Krievkalns	"Staying Alive"	Kristaps Krievkalns, Madara Celma	9	1,897	1	10	9
4	Yana Kay	"Falling Into You"	Yana Kay	18	12,390	7	25	7
5	Labvēlīgais tips	"Koka klucis Konstantīns"	Labvēlīgais tips, Andris Freidenfelds	27	10,899	6	33	6
6	Marija Naumova	"Hey, Boy, Follow Me"	Marija Naumova	26	35,305	12	38	3
7	Credo	"Cita tautasdziesma"	Armands Alksnis	7	5,569	3	10	9
8	Gunārs Kalniņš	"Diamonds and Pearls"	Gunārs Kalniņš, Guntars Račs	18	3,755	2	20	8
9	Shake and Bake	"Spirit of Love"	Shake and Bake, Jānis Stībelis	31	9,005	5	36	4
10	Arnis Mednis	"Too Much"	Arnis Mednis, Gustavs Terzens	32	16,994	10	42	1

Detailed Jury Votes
R/O	Song	Musicians	Industry	Cultural	International	Total
1	"I Wish I Knew"	8	7	10	7	32
2	"It's Not the End"	5	12	5	10	32
3	"Staying Alive"	1	2	4	2	9
4	"Falling Into You"	2	5	6	5	18
5	"Koka klucis Konstantīns"	6	6	7	8	27
6	"Hey, Boy, Follow Me"	3	8	3	12	26
7	"Cita tautasdziesma"	4	1	1	1	7
8	"Diamonds and Pearls"	7	3	2	6	18
9	"Spirit of Love"	12	4	12	3	31
10	"Too Much"	10	10	8	4	32

Members of the Jury
Jury	Members
Musicians	Jānis Lūsēns – composer; Raimonds Macats – musician; Aigars Krēsla – musician
Music industry personnel	Jānis Šipkēvics – program director of Radio SWH; Ojārs Grasmanis – head of Pasadena Group Promotion; Helvijs Stengrēvics – businessman and musician
Cultural workers	Rolands Tjarve – General Director of LTV; Dzintris Kolāts – General Director of Latvijas Radio; Vija Virtmane – Director of the Cultural Policy Department of the Latvian Ministry of Culture
International members	Lars Salls (Denmark) – commercial attaché at the Embassy of Denmark in Latvia; Edward van de Vendel (Netherlands) – poet and lyricist; Mi Saraskoski (Finland) – producer and music manager

=== Promotion ===
To promote "Too Much" as the Latvian Eurovision entry, Arnis Mednis performed during the Lithuanian Eurovision national final on 9 March 2001.

== At Eurovision ==
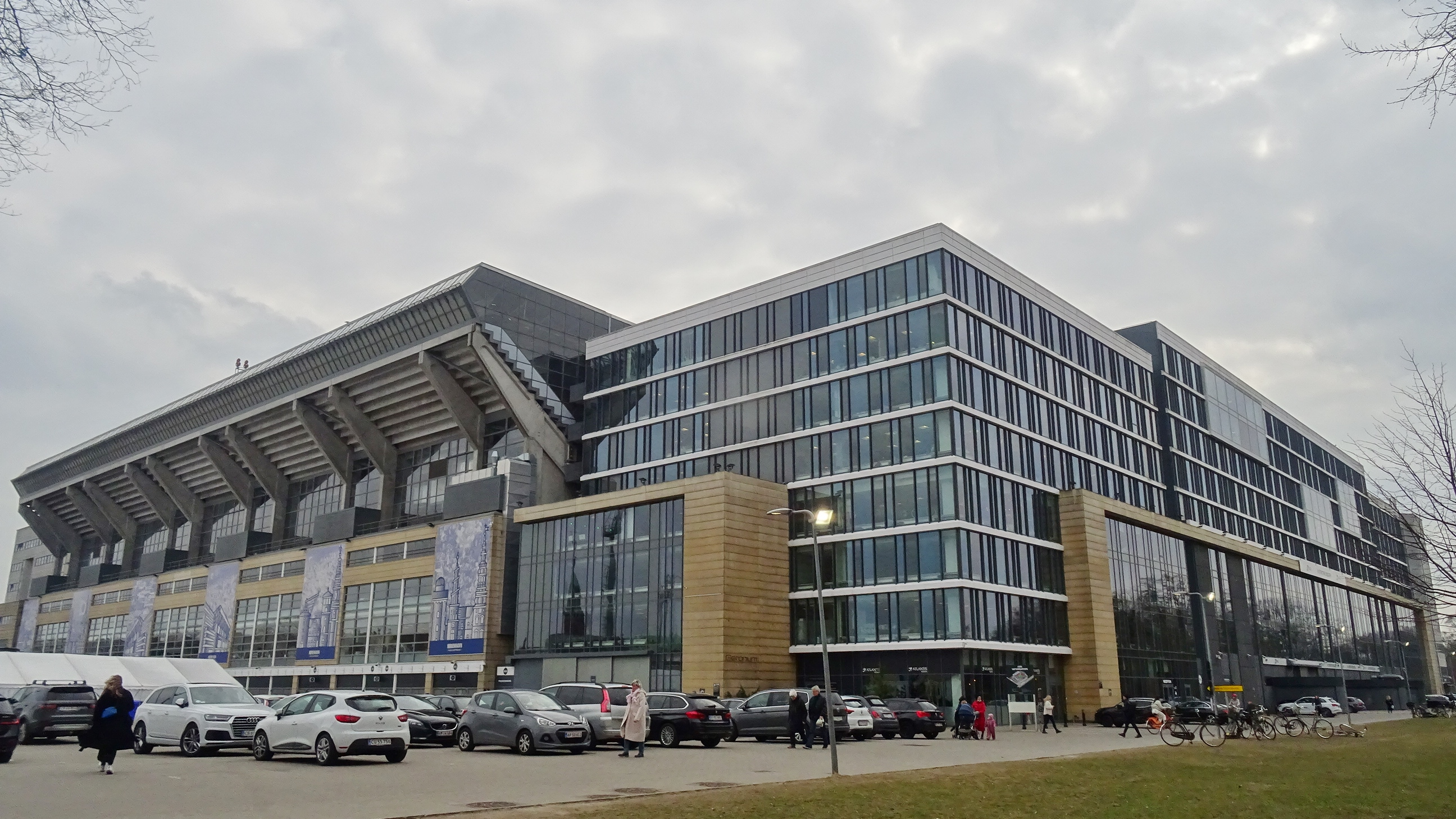
The Eurovision Song Contest 2001 took place at Parken Stadium in Copenhagen, Denmark.

The Eurovision Song Contest 2001 took place at Parken Stadium in Copenhagen, Denmark, on 12 May 2001. The relegation rules introduced for the 1997 contest were again utilised ahead of the 2001 contest, based on each country's average points total in previous contests. The 23 participants were made up of the host country, the "Big Four" countries (France, Germany, Spain and the United Kingdom), and the 12 countries with the highest average scores between the 1996 and 2000 contests competed in the final. On 21 November 2000, an allocation draw was held which determined the running order and Latvia was set to perform in position 9, following the entry from Lithuania and before the entry from Croatia. Latvia finished in eighteenth place scoring 16 points.

The contest was broadcast in Latvia on LTV, with commentary by Kārlis Streips.

=== Voting ===
Below is a breakdown of points awarded to Latvia and awarded by Latvia in the contest. The nation awarded its 12 points to Estonia in the contest.

LTV appointed Renārs Kaupers as its spokesperson to announce the results of the Latvian televote during the final.

Points awarded to Latvia
Score	Country
12 points	
10 points	
8 points	Estonia; Lithuania
7 points	
6 points	
5 points	
4 points	
3 points	
2 points	
1 point	

Points awarded by Latvia
Score	Country
12 points	Estonia
10 points	Denmark
8 points	Russia
7 points	France
6 points	Sweden
5 points	Lithuania
4 points	Spain
3 points	United Kingdom
2 points	Greece
1 point	Germany
