= Sweden in the Eurovision Song Contest 2002 =

- Eurovision Song Contest 2002
- Participating broadcaster: Sveriges Television (SVT)
- Country: Sweden
- Selection process: Melodifestivalen 2002
- Selection date: 1 March 2002

Competing entry
- Song: "Never Let It Go"
- Artist: Afro-dite
- Songwriter: Marcos Ubeda

Placement
- Final result: 8th, 72 points

Participation chronology

Sweden was represented at the Eurovision Song Contest 2002 with the song "Never Let It Go", written by Marcos Ubeda, and performed by Afro-dite. The Swedish participating broadcaster Sveriges Television (SVT) selected its entry through Melodifestivalen 2002.

== Before Eurovision ==
=== Melodifestivalen 2002 ===
Sveriges Television (SVT) pre-selection for Eurovision Song Contest 2002, Melodifestivalen 2002 was held on 1 March 2002. For the first time in the history of the competition, four heats were held around the country in various arenas around Sweden. A "second chance" round was also held. In total, 32 songs competed this year, compared to 10 the previous years. For the first time, songs could be sung in a language other than Swedish. Hosted by Kristin Kaspersen and Claes Åkeson, the final was won by Afro-dite after the disco group won both the televoting and jury voting. The song they performed was written by Marcos Ubeda and called "Never Let It Go".

==== Heats and Winner's Choice round ====
- The first heat took place on 19 January 2002. "Kom och ta mig" performed by Brandsta City Släckers and "Adrenaline" performed by Méndez qualified directly to the final, while "Världen utanför" performed by Barbados and "Last to Know" performed by Excellence advanced to the Winner's Choice round. "Blue as Her Angel Eyes" performed by Tom Nordahl, "Du har rört vid min själ" performed by Camilla Lindén, "Hollyowood-Do" performed by Zoë and "En värld som alltid brinner" performed by Richard Sköld were eliminated from the contest.
- The second heat took place on 26 January 2002. "Never Let It Go" performed by Afro-dite and "No hay nada más" performed by Javiera qualified directly to the final, while "What Difference Does It Make?" performed by the Poets and "Sail Away" performed by Annika Ljungberg advanced to the Winner's Choice round. "Ingenting ingenting" performed by Jennifer Newberry, "Du och jag (i hela världen)" performed by Martin, "Sluta!" performed by Ann-Louise and Molle and "Ge mig mitt hjärta tillbaka" performed by Jakob Stadell and Voice Boys were eliminated from the contest.
- The third heat took place on 2 February 2002. "Hon kommer med solsken" performed by Östen med Resten and "Big Time Party" performed by Hanna & Lina qualified directly to the final, while "Tidig är tiden" performed by Rolf Carlsson and "Det innersta rummet" performed by Date advanced to the Winner's Choice round. "Back Again" performed by Towe Jaarnek, "You're the Best Thing" performed by Linda Grip, "Ingenting är större än vi" performed by Arvingarna and "Hon är en annan nu" performed by Sylvia Vrethammar were eliminated from the contest.
- The fourth heat took place on 8 February 2002. "Vem é dé du vill ha" performed by Kikki, Bettan & Lotta and "The One That You Need" performed by Friends qualified directly to the final, while "Sista andetaget" performed by Jan Johansen and "Son of a Liar" performed by Kina Jaarnek advanced to the Winner's Choice round. "Ge mig himlen för en dag" performed by Solo, "I Want You" performed by Niklas Andersson, "It Takes 2" performed by the Honeydrops and "Vackrare nu" performed by Fredrik Wännman were eliminated from the contest.
- The Winner's Choice round (Vinnarnas val) took place on 22 February 2002. "Världen utanför" performed by Barbados and "Sista andetaget" performed by Jan Johansen qualified to the final.

==== Final ====
The final took place on 1 March 2002 at the Globe Arena in Stockholm.

R/O	Artist	Song	Jury	Public	Total	Place
1	Afro-dite	"Never Let It Go"	116	132	248	1
2	Brandsta City Släckers	"Kom och ta mig"	0	88	88	5
3	Javiera	"No hay nada más"	71	0	71	6
4	Barbados	"Världen utanför"	46	44	90	4
5	Hanna & Lina	"Big Time Party"	43	0	43	9
6	Östen med Resten	"Hon kommer med solsken"	11	22	33	10
7	Friends	"The One That You Need"	46	0	46	8
8	Kikki, Bettan & Lotta	"Vem é dé du vill ha"	34	66	100	3
9	Jan Johansen	"Sista andetaget"	54	11	65	7
10	Méndez	"Adrenaline"	52	110	162	2

== At Eurovision ==
At the contest Afro-dite were drawn to sing in 12th position, just before the interval. They eventually finished in 8th position (out of 24) with 72 points, receiving a maximum 12 points from Bosnia-Herzegovina.

The representative for the host country, Estonia, Sahlene, was Swedish. She finished 3rd, and got 12 points from Sweden.

=== Voting ===
Points awarded to Sweden
Score	Country
12 points	Bosnia and Herzegovina
10 points	Denmark; Lithuania
8 points	Estonia
7 points	Finland; Slovenia
6 points	
5 points	
4 points	Austria; Latvia; Turkey
3 points	Israel
2 points	
1 point	Belgium; Greece; United Kingdom

Points awarded by Sweden
Score	Country
12 points	Estonia
10 points	Finland
8 points	France
7 points	Spain
6 points	Bosnia and Herzegovina
5 points	Latvia
4 points	Malta
3 points	Belgium
2 points	United Kingdom
1 point	Cyprus
