= Re:collection 93-08 =

Compilation album by Magnus Carlsson
- Released: November 2008
- Genre: dansband pop, disco, pop, schlager
- Length: 2 hours, 16 minutes
- Label: Warner Music Sweden

Magnus Carlsson chronology
Live Forever – The Album (2007)	Re:collection 93-08 (2008)	Christmas (2009)

Re:collection 93-08 is a compilation album by Swedish artist Magnus Carlsson released in November 2008. It consists of recording by him Barbados, Alcazar and his year as a solo artist.

== Track listing ==
=== CD1 ===
1. Live Forever – Magnus Carlsson
2. Kom hem – Barbados
3. Not a Sinner, Nor a Saint – Alcazar
4. Hold Me – Barbados
5. Nu kommer flickorna – Barbados
6. Världen utanför – Barbados
7. Physical – Alcazar
8. Lev livet! – Magnus Carlsson
9. Grand Hotel – Barbados
10. Belinda – Barbados
11. Waves of Love – Magnus Carlsson
12. Love Life – Alcazar
13. Aldrig i livet – Barbados
14. Alcastar – Alcazar
15. Din hemlighet – Barbados
16. Happy People (Swedish language-version) – Barbados
17. Wonderland – Alcazar
18. I mörkret här med dig – Barbados
19. Då Talar kärleken sitt språk – Magnus Carlsson
20. Always On My Mind – Barbados

=== CD2 ===
1. Start The Fire – Alcazar
2. Rosalita – Barbados
3. Stilla ro och nära – Åsa Jinder med Magnus Carlsson
4. The Lion Sleeps Tonight (Wimoweh) – Barbados
5. Allt som jag ser – Barbados
6. Gå din egen väg (On The Radio) – Magnus Carlsson, duet with Mela Tesfazion
7. This Is The World We Live In – Alcazar
8. Mariann från Tylösand – Barbados
9. I Was Born This Way – Magnus Carlsson
10. Se mig – Barbados
11. Someday – Alcazar
12. Någonting har hänt – Barbados
13. Singing to Heaven – Alcazar
14. YMCA (Radio Version) – Magnus Carlsson
15. Walking In My Shoes – Magnus Carlsson
16. Heden – Magnus Carlsson
17. Alla dina kyssar – Barbados
18. Another Rainbow – Magnus Carlsson
19. Blå horisont – Barbados
20. Alltid leva (Live Forever – Swedish language-version) – Magnus Carlsson

== Charts ==
Chart (2008/09)	Peak position
Swedish Albums (Sverigetopplistan)	7

== Release history ==
Region	Release Date	Format	Label	Catalogue
Sweden	November 2008	Compact Disc	Warner Music	5051865-170624
