= Live Forever =

Live Forever or Liveforever may refer to:

== Plants ==
- Dudleya, a genus of succulent plants
- Hylotelephium, a genus of succulent perennial plants
- Sempervivum, a genus of succulent plants

== Music ==
=== Albums ===
- Live Forever (The Screaming Jets album), 2002
- Live Forever (Bob Marley album), 2011
- Live Forever (Matthew West album), 2015
- Live Forever (Bartees Strange album), 2020
- Live Forever (Hurray for the Riff Raff album), 2026
- Live Forever – The Album, a 2007 album by Magnus Carlsson
- Live Forever (mixtape), by Lil Peep, 2015
- Live Forever, an album by Jett Rebel

=== Songs ===
- "Live Forever" (The Band Perry song), 2015
- "Live Forever" (Liam Payne song), 2019
- "Live Forever" (Magnus Carlsson song), 2007
- "Live Forever" (Oasis song), 1994
- "Live Forever", a 2005 song by Moby from the album Hotel: Ambient
- "Live Forever", a 2019 song by Bazzi from the mixtape Soul Searching
- "Live Forever", a song by Black Sabbath from the album 13
- "Live Forever", a song by Hollywood Undead from Day of the Dead
- "Live Forever", a song by Drew Holcomb and the Neighbors
- "Live Forever", a 2010 single by Lange featuring Emma Hewitt
- "Live Forever", a 2015 song by Lil Peep
- "Live Forever", a song by Rancid from their 2023 album Tomorrow Never Comes

== Other ==
- Immortality, living for an infinite length of time
- Live Forever: The Rise and Fall of Brit Pop, a 2003 documentary film

== See also ==
- Aizoon (Greek: "live forever"), a plant species named by Max Koch
