= Gladys del Pilar =

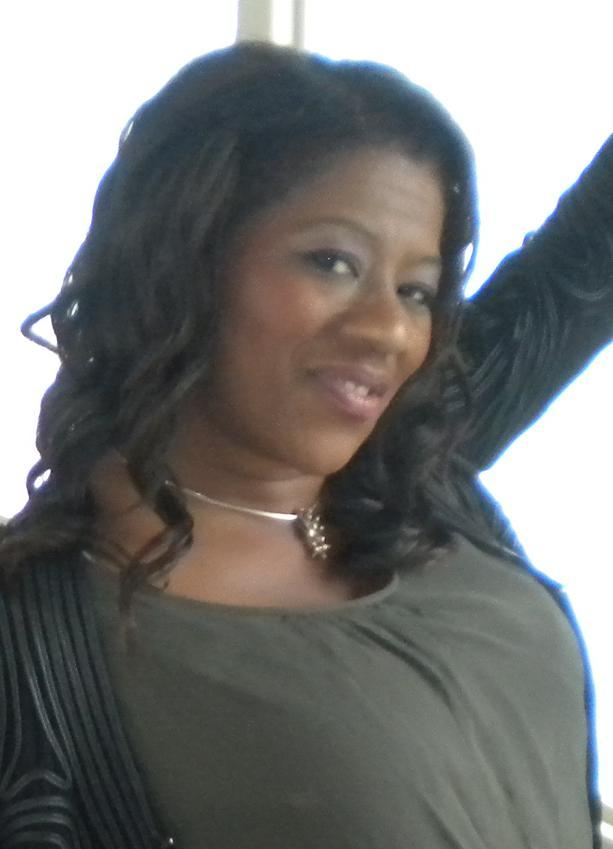
- del Pilar in 2011

Background information
- Born: Eva Gladys del Pilar Werner; 11 October 1967 (age 58); Guayaquil, Ecuador
- Origin: Örebro, Sweden
- Genres: Disco; Schlager
- Occupations: Singer, dancer
- Years active: 1989–present

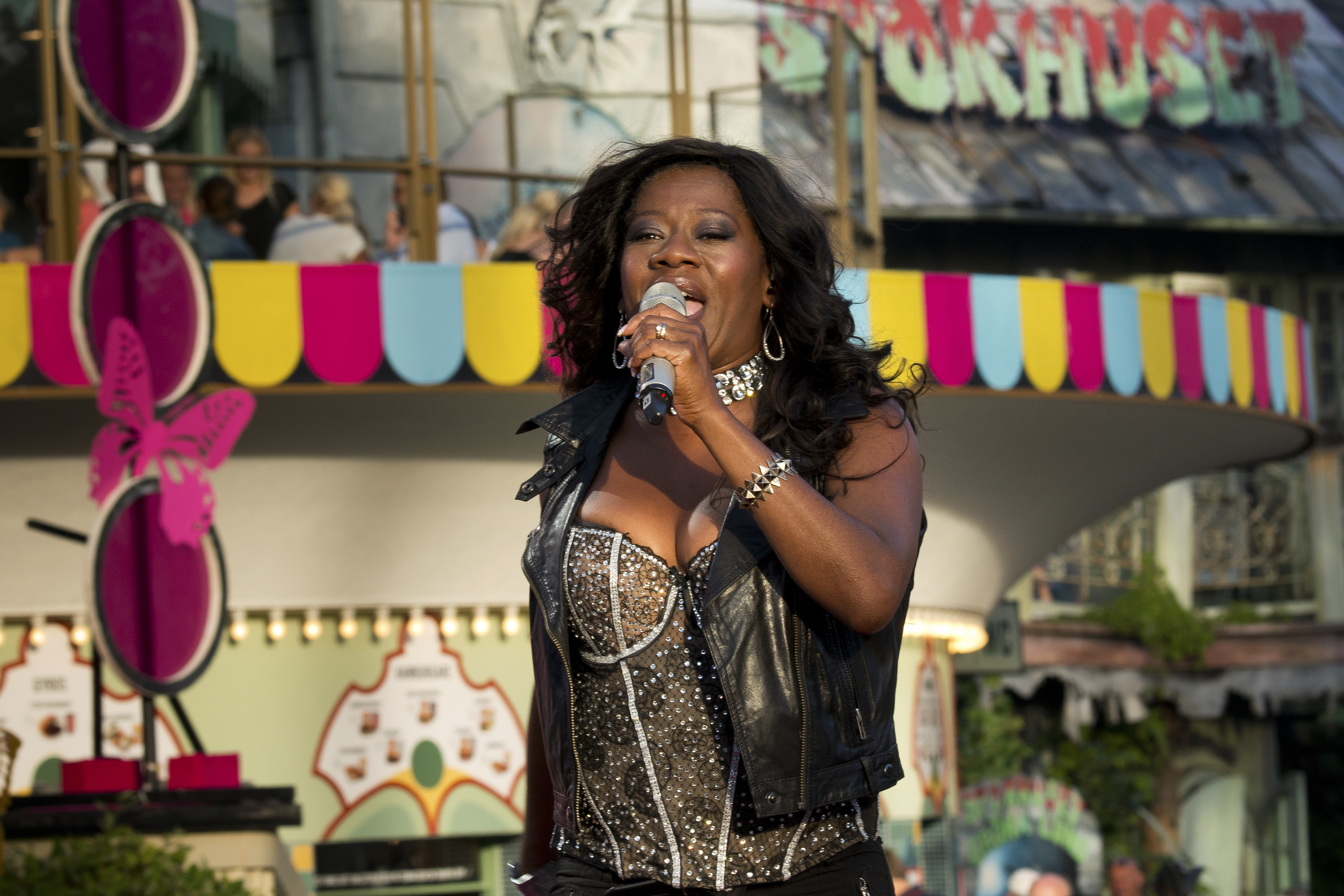
Gladys del Pilar participates in the TV program Sommarkrysset at Gröna Lund in Stockholm, summer 2014.

Eva Gladys del Pilar Werner (born 11 October 1967) is an Ecuadorian-born Swedish singer and dancer. She is best known for being a member of the pop group Afro-dite, with which she represented Sweden in the Eurovision Song Contest 2002.

== Career ==
Gladys mother noticed Gladys had an interest in music and made sure she attended a local music school.

She was asked to provide back-up vocals for Big Deal, a popular local rock band. Gladys and the sound engineer at Big Deal's recording studio formed the house music group Real Power. They soon became associated with the Nordik beat scene and signed to SweMix Records. ‘'Real Power'’ released the single "Trust" which received plenty of radio play. She provided back-up vocals for many Nordik beat/SweMix acts such as Kayo and DJ's. Gladys began working with Denniz Pop and we wrote the single "Made Up My Mind" which became a huge hit and topped the charts. Dr. Alban was the same record label, and toured in Europe together with Gladys as a guest artist.

In 1992 she was named Best Newcomer at DJ Music Awards The following year she appeared on stage with ABBA-the True Story at Berns, and Fame at the China Theater.

In 1994, Gladys was in Melodifestivalen, the Swedish pre-selection for Eurovision Song Contest and came in second with Det vackraste jag vet. The next year she performed as part of the cabaret Hot'n Tot up at Berns. It was Gladys, Blossom Tainton-Lindquist, Vivian Cardinal, and Francesca Quartey. The show was a success and they took the show o the road and toured Sweden. She and Blossom Tainton-Lindquist, would later collaborate on other projects.

Glads has performed on many recordings as part of a group, back up vocals or as a featured vocalist on house/club records. She released her first solo album, Movin 'On, on Eagle Records in 1996. Since the late 1990s Gladys visits various gospel choirs and lends his voice to Disney films. She works again with colleagues Blossom Tainton-Lindquist and Kayo Shekoni as the group Afro-dite. At first they concentrated on the business job, but gradually it became even more public concerts.

She won Melodifestivalen 2002 as a member of Afro-dite with the song Never Let It Go, and participated in the Eurovision Song Contest in Tallinn, Estonia. The single sold platinum in a few months, and full-length CD goes straight to 13th spot on the list of the 40 best-selling albums in Sweden.

After the victory in the Melodifestivalen, Afro-dite appeared again in the contest, in 2003 with the song Aqua Playa.

In the spring, Gladys left Afro-dite and began to work on her own with gospel and big bands all over Sweden. She participate in 2003 edition of the Stockholm Jazz Festival with gospel group Servants.

As a solo artist she entered the 2004 Eurovision Song Contest with Baby I Can not Stop. Afro-dite has since re-formed and does appearances and small tours in Sweden.

Gladys has a huge interest in food and owns and operates a food and music catering business. She has also been featured in various Swedish television shows such as Så ska det låta, Postkodkampen cooking show Teatersupén .

In the last few years she has appeared in on stage in Carmen and Hairspray in Stockholm.

== Personal life ==
Gladys and her twin sister Ann Consuelo were born in 1967 in Ecuador and grew up in a nunnery in northern Ecuador in difficult circumstances. They were adopted to Örebro, Sweden at age 7.
