= Eurotix =

Synthpop project from Sweden

- Origin: Gävle, Sweden
- Genres: Synth pop
- Years active: 2013-present
- Label: Computer Killed The Recordstore
- Members: Dennis Alexis Hellström; Larry Forsberg
- Website: dennisalexis.com/english/music/eurotix.html

Eurotix is a synthpop project from Gävle, Sweden, consisting of the musicians Dennis Alexis Hellström (born 1984) and Larry Forsberg (born 1965), who started the duo in 2013. Eurotix's music and sound is inspired by the 80's synthpop and dance music. It has influences from italo disco, euro disco and Hi-NRG, but also from Swedish schlager music.

Larry Forsberg is a songwriter and producer. He has written songs for acts participating in Melodifestivalen, such as After Dark, Jill Johnson, Bradsta City Släckers and Östen med Resten.

Dennis Alexis Hellström is the singer and frontman of the group. He has earlier released music under the pseudonym Bimbo Boy. He's working at a local newspaper in Gävle, while also running three blogs.

Eurotix released their first studio album, The Secret, in 2014. They have released several singles and EPs since 2013, many of them with accompanying music videos. The song "Kiss Them For Me", a single from their second album Deux, is a tribute to princess Diana, an open letter from Diana to Charles.

In December 2015, Eurotix received their first number one with the italo disco track "The Best Of Times" on the radio station Club 80's "New Generation Chart". It was still at number one when January's chart was presented. The track has been voted by the fans to be the next single/EP taken from the Deux album.

== Discography ==
=== Albums ===
- 2014: The Secret
- 2015: Deux
- 2016: Besides
- 2018: Pop
- 2019: Try Again - Remixed, Remade & Remodeled
- 2020: The Best Of Times 2013–2020

=== Singles and EPs ===
- 2013: "I Plead Insanity"
- 2014: "Life As It Slips Away"
- 2014: "Let's Die Young"
- 2014: "Are You Strong Enough?"
- 2014: "He'll Be Home For Christmas"
- 2015: "Kiss Them For Me"
- 2015: "Kiss Them For Me (Remixes)"
- 2015: "Christmas On My Own"
- 2016: "The Best Of Times"
- 2017: "Conquer The Universe"
- 2018: "Naughty Boys"
- 2018: "My Eyes"
- 2018: "Hypnotized"
- 2019: "Cold"
- 2020: "I Forget Myself"
- 2020: "We Could Have Been" (new version)
- 2021: "Love Take Me Higher"
