= Melodifestivalen 2002 =

Swedish music competition

Dates and venue
- Heat 1: 19 January 2002
- Heat 2: 26 January 2002
- Heat 3: 2 February 2002
- Heat 4: 9 February 2002
- Winners' Choice: 22 February 2002
- Final: 1 March 2002

Production
- Broadcaster: Sveriges Television (SVT)
- Director: Marius Bratten
- Presenters: Kristin Kaspersen; Claes Åkesson

Participants
- Number of entries: 32
- Number of finalists: 10

Vote
- Voting system: Heats: 100% public vote Winners' Choice: 100% jury vote Final: 50% public vote, 50% jury vote
- Winning song: "Never Let It Go" by Afro-dite

Melodifestivalen 2002 was the 42nd edition of the Swedish music competition Melodifestivalen, which was organised by Sveriges Television (SVT) and took place over a seven-week period between 19 January and 1 March 2002. The winner of the competition was Afro-dite with the song "Never Let It Go", who represented Sweden in the Eurovision Song Contest 2002, where she came eight with 72 points. All shows were hosted by Kristin Kaspersen and Claes Åkesson.

== Format ==
This was the first year that a heat format had been used for the competition; but also, the first where songs were permitted in languages other than Swedish, resulting in a significant number of English language songs, and two songs with lyrics in Spanish. "Ett vackert par", composed by Py Bäckman and Micke Wennborn was disqualified before the competition, when the dance band Grönwalls had performed it on the radio before the contest (not knowing it was supposed to enter). Nanne Grönvall and Nick Borgen was thought as possible performers. It was replaced by "Sista andetaget".

Competition Schedule
Show	Date	City	Venue
Heat 1	19 January 2002	Växjö	Tipshallen
Heat 2	26 January 2002	Norrköping	Himmelstalundshallen
Heat 3	2 February 2002	Sundsvall	Nordichallen
Heat 4	9 February 2002	Falun	Lugnet
Winners' Choice	22 February 2002	Stockholm	SVT Broadcasting House
Final	1 March 2002	Stockholm	Stockholm Globe Arena

The contest consisted of four heats of eight participants each. The songs that came in the first two placed qualified directly to the final while the ones that came third and fourth qualified to the Winners' Choice round. There, eight songs competed and they were judged by a jury of previous Melodifestivalen winners which individually ranked each song. Then the average was used to determine the final placement. The first two songs qualified for the final.

== Competing entries ==
Artist	Song	Songwriter(s)
Afro-dite	"Never Let It Go"	Marcos Ubeda
Ann-Louise & Molle	"Sluta"	Anders Nyman; Robin Rex; Tobias Karlsson
Annika Ljungberg	"Sail Away"	Johan Ramström; Patrik Magnusson
Arvingarna	"Ingenting är större än vi"	Thomas G:son
Barbados	"Världen utanför"	Calle Kindbom; Thomas G:son
Brandsta City Släckers	"Kom och ta mig"	Larry Forsberg; Lennart Wastesson; Sven-Inge Sjöberg
Camilla Lindén	"Du har rört vid min själ"	Claes-Göran Bjerdin; Tommy Eriksson
Date	"Det innersta rummet"	Johnny Thunqvist; Patrik Tibell
Excellence	"Last to Know"	Brian Hobbs; Daniel Eklund
Fredrik Wännman	"Vackrare nu"	Fredrik Wännman
Friends	"The One That You Need"	Henrik Sethsson; Pontus Assarsson
Hanna & Lina Hedlund	"Big Time Party"	Lotta Ahlin; Tommy Lydell
Jakob Stadell & Voice Boys	"Ge mig mitt hjärta tillbaka"	Lars Karlsson; Suzzie Tapper
Jan Johansen	"Sista andetaget"	Dan Attlerud; Thomas Thörnholm
Javiera Muñoz	"No hay nada más"	Javiera Muñoz; Lars "Dille" Diedricson; Marcos Ubeda
Jennifer Newberry	"Ingenting ingenting"	Joakim Björklund; Jonas Sällberg; Tony Malm
Kikki, Bettan & Lotta	"Vem é dé du vill ha"	Calle Kindbom; Thomas G:son
Kina Jaarnek	"Son of a Liar"	Marcos Ubeda
Linda Grip	"You're the Best Thing"	Linda Grip; Marcus Black
Martin	"Du och jag (i hela världen)"	Martin Svensson
Méndez	"Adrenaline"	Leopoldo Méndez; Pablo Cepeda; Patrik Henzel; Rasmus Lindwall; Robert Wåtz
Niklas Andersson	"I Want You"	Micke Wedberg; Svante Persson
Östen med Resten	"Hon kommer med solsken"	Larry Forsberg; Lennart Wastesson; Sven-Inge Sjöberg
Poets	"What Difference Does It Make?"	Thomas G:son
Richard Sköld	"En värld som alltid brinner"	Erik Appelros; Istvan Steneberg; Richard Sköld
Rolf Carlsson	"Tidig är tiden"	Markku Reigngold; Rolf Carlsson
Solo	"Ge mig himlen för en dag"	Jonas Ohlson; Niclas Eriksson; Ulf Georgsson
Sylvia Vrethammar	"Hon är en annan nu"	Dan Hylander; Tomas Enochsson
The Honeydrops	"It Takes 2"	Mats Hedström
Tom Nordahl	"Blue As Her Angel Eyes"	Micke Wennborn; Py Bäckman
Towe Jaarnek	"Back Again"	Kjell-Åke Norén; Towe Jaarnek
Zoë	"Hollywood-do"	Sofia Geiryd (Zoë); Stefan Olsson

== Contest overview ==
=== Heat 1 ===
The first heat took place on 19 January 2002 at the Tipshallen in Växjö. 2,653,000 viewers watched the heat live. A total of 403,993 votes were cast, with a total of SEK 3,425,441 collected for Radiohjälpen.

R/O	Artist	Song	Votes		Total	Place	Result
R/O	Artist	Song	Round 1	Round 2	Total	Place	Result
1	Excellence	"Last to Know"	16,928	23,081	40,009	4	Winners' Choice
2	Tom Nordahl	"Blue As Her Angel Eyes"	4,137	—N/a	4,137	7	Out
3	Barbados	"Världen utanför"	44,899	52,309	97,208	3	Winners' Choice
4	Camilla Lindén	"Du har rört vid min själ"	15,549	—N/a	15,549	5	Out
5	Brandsta City Släckers	"Kom och ta mig"	59,007	71,194	130,201	1	Final
6	Zoë	"Hollywood-do"	12,733	—N/a	12,733	6	Out
7	Richard Sköld	"En värld som alltid brinner"	3,352	—N/a	3,352	8	Out
8	Méndez	"Adrenaline"	45,731	52,632	98,363	2	Final

=== Heat 2 ===
The second heat took place on 26 January 2002 at the Himmelstalundshallen in Norrköping. 2,318,000 viewers watched the heat live. A total of 311,381 votes were cast, with a total of SEK 2,646,739 collected for Radiohjälpen.

R/O	Artist	Song	Votes		Total	Place	Result
R/O	Artist	Song	Round 1	Round 2	Total	Place	Result
1	Poets	"What Difference Does It Make?"	22,232	28,560	50,792	3	Winners' Choice
2	Jennifer Newberry	"Ingenting ingenting"	2,360	—N/a	2,360	8	Out
3	Javiera Muñoz	"No hay nada más"	25,023	31,915	56,938	2	Final
4	Martin	"Du och jag (i hela världen)"	5,787	—N/a	5,787	7	Out
5	Ann-Louise & Molle	"Sluta"	9,227	—N/a	9,227	6	Out
6	Jakob Stadell & Voice Boys	"Ge mig mitt hjärta tillbaka"	13,604	—N/a	13,604	5	Out
7	Afro-dite	"Never Let It Go"	56,029	89,487	145,516	1	Final
8	Annika Ljungberg	"Sail Away"	13,907	12,596	26,503	4	Winners' Choice

=== Heat 3 ===
The third heat took place on 2 February 2002 at the Nordichallen in Sundsvall. 2,188,000 viewers watched the heat live. A total of 219,474 votes were cast, with a total of SEK 1,865,529 collected for Radiohjälpen.

R/O	Artist	Song	Votes		Total	Place	Result
R/O	Artist	Song	Round 1	Round 2	Total	Place	Result
1	Towe Jaarnek	"Back Again"	9,053	—N/a	9,053	7	Out
2	Date	"Det innersta rummet"	14,127	17,624	31,751	3	Winners' Choice
3	Linda Grip	"You're the Best Thing"	2,679	—N/a	2,679	8	Out
4	Arvingarna	"Ingenting är större än vi"	10,186	—N/a	10,186	6	Out
5	Östen med Resten	"Hon kommer med solsken"	33,570	46,553	80,123	1	Final
6	Rolf Carlsson	"Tidig är tiden"	11,000	19,104	30,104	4	Winners' Choice
7	Sylvia Vrethammar	"Hon är en annan nu"	10,251	—N/a	10,251	5	Out
8	Hanna & Lina Hedlund	"Big Time Party"	21,821	23,093	44,914	2	Final

=== Heat 4 ===
The fourth heat took place on 9 February 2002 at the Lugnet in Falun. 2,971,000 viewers watched the heat live. A total of 332,500 votes were cast, with a total of SEK 2,826,250 collected for Radiohjälpen.

R/O	Artist	Song	Votes		Total	Place	Result
R/O	Artist	Song	Round 1	Round 2	Total	Place	Result
1	Kina Jaarnek	"Son of a Liar"	14,186	25,578	39,764	4	Winners' Choice
2	Solo	"Ge mig himlen för en dag"	9,447	—N/a	9,447	7	Out
3	Niklas Andersson	"I Want You"	8,354	—N/a	8,354	8	Out
4	Friends	"The One That You Need"	24,584	40,188	65,042	2	Final
5	The Honeydrops	"It Takes 2"	10,277	—N/a	10,227	6	Out
6	Kikki, Bettan & Lotta	"Vem é dé du vill ha"	69,514	66,048	135,562	1	Final
7	Jan Johansen	"Sista andetaget"	23,201	29,140	52,341	3	Winners' Choice
8	Fredrik Wännman	"Vackrare nu"	11,214	—N/a	11,214	5	Out

=== Winners' Choice ===
The Winners' Choice round took place on 22 February 2002 at the SVT Broadcasting House in Stockholm. 2,037,000 viewers watched the show live.

R/O	Artist	Song	Place	Result
1	Excellence	"Last to Know"	7	Out
2	Barbados	"Världen utanför"	1 / 2	Final
3	The Poets	"What Difference Does It Make?"	5	Out
4	Annika Ljungberg	"Sail Away"	3	Out
5	Date	"Det innersta rummet"	6	Out
6	Rolf Carlsson	"Tidig är tiden"	8	Out
7	Kina Jaarnek	"Son of a Liar"	4	Out
8	Jan Johansen	"Sista andetaget"	1 / 2	Final

Winners' Jury members
Juror	Winning edition
Anders Berglund	Chair of the jury without voting rights
Charlotte Nilsson	1999, 2008
Claes af Geijerstam	1973
Jill Johnson	1998
Lasse Holm	1986
Nanne Grönvall	1996
Roger Pontare	1994, 2000
Siw Malmkvist	1959, 1961
Svante Thuresson	1966
Tommy Nilsson	1989

=== Final ===
The final took place on 1 March 2002 at the Stockholm Globe Arena in Stockholm. 3,720,000 viewers watched the show live. A total of 926,318 votes were cast, with a total of SEK 7,873,703 collected for Radiohjälpen.

R/O	Artist	Song	Juries	Televote		Total	Place
R/O	Artist	Song	Juries	Votes	Points	Total	Place
1	Afro-dite	"Never Let It Go"	116	162,612	132	248	1
2	Brandsta City Släckers	"Kom och ta mig"	0	147,700	88	88	5
3	Javiera Muñoz	"No hay nada más"	71	39,978	0	71	6
4	Barbados	"Världen utanför"	46	94,770	44	90	4
5	Hanna Hedlund & Lina Hedlund	"Big Time Party"	43	19,226	0	43	9
6	Östen med Resten	"Hon kommer med solsken"	11	59,149	22	33	10
7	Friends	"The One That You Need"	46	58,634	0	46	8
8	Kikki, Bettan & Lotta	"Vem é dé du vill ha"	34	136,175	66	100	3
9	Jan Johansen	"Sista andetaget"	54	58,668	11	65	7
10	Mendez	"Adrenaline"	52	149,406	110	162	2

Detailed jury votes
R/O	Song	Luleå	Umeå	Sundsvall	Falun	Karlstad	Örebro	Norrköping	Gothenburg	Växjö	Malmö	Stockholm	Total
1	"Never Let It Go"	12	8	6	12	12	12	12	12	8	10	12	116
2	"Kom och ta mig"												0
3	"No hay nada más"	8		2	1	4	10	10	10	10	12	4	71
4	"Världen utanför"		12			8	6	8		6		6	46
5	"Big Time Party"	10	6	10	2	2		1	6	2	4		43
6	"Hon kommer med solsken"	4		4		1	1					1	11
7	"The One That You Need"	6	10	1	6		8	4	8		1	2	46
8	"Vem é dé du vill ha"		4		10				2	4	6	8	34
9	"Sista andetaget"	1	2	8	8	6	2	2	1	12	2	10	54
10	"Adrenaline"	2	1	12	4	10	4	6	4	1	8		52
Jury spokespersons
Luleå – Bobbo Nordenskiöld; Umeå – Micke Leijnegard; Sundsvall – Linda Olofsson; Falun – Mia Norin; Karlstad – Staffan Lindström; Örebro – Ernst Kirchsteiger; Norrköping – Joachim Vogel; Gothenburg – Sara Wennerblom; Växjö – Josefine Sundström; Malmö – Emma Kronqvist; Stockholm – Anders Lundin

== Ratings ==
Viewing figures by show
Show	Air date	Viewers (millions)	Ref.
Heat 1	19 January 2002	2.653	
Heat 2	26 January 2002	2.318	
Heat 3	2 February 2002	2.188	
Heat 4	9 February 2002	2.971	
Winners' Choice	22 February 2002	2.037	
Final	1 March 2002	3.720	

== See also ==
- Eurovision Song Contest 2002
- Sweden in the Eurovision Song Contest
- Sweden in the Eurovision Song Contest 2002
