= Blickar som tänder =

Studio album by Friends
- Released: October 2000; 14 May 2001
- Genre: modern dansband music, dansband pop
- Length: 49 minutes
- Label: Mariann

Friends chronology
Friends på turné (1999)	Blickar som tänder (2000)	Dance with Me (2002)

Blickar som tänder is the second studio album by Swedish band Friends, released in 2000. The album was re-released in 2001 as "Lyssna till ditt hjärta" with two bonus tracks.

The songs "När jag tänker på i morgon", "Holiday", "Vad pojkar gör om natten", "Blickar som tänder" and "Lyssna till ditt hjärta" all charted at Svensktoppen.

== Track listing ==
=== First release ===
#	Title	Writer
1.	"Blickar som tänder"	Lars Diedricson, Christer Lundh
2.	"Din första kärlek"	John Ballard
3.	"Vad pojkar gör om natten"	Henrik Sethsson, Jana Vähämäki
4.	" Minns du hur vi älskade "	Peter Grönvall, Nanne Grönvall
5.	"När jag tänker på i morgon"	Lasse Holm, Ingela Forsman
6.	"Na na na"	Mikael Erlandsson
7.	"Tommy tycker om mig"	Lasse Holm, Ingela Forsman
8.	"Även om det regnar"	Thomas G:son, Per-Anders Forsén
9.	"Holiday"	Henrik Sethsson, Jana Vähämäki
10.	"Natten börjar ljusna"	Carl-Henry Kindbom, Carl Lösnitz
11.	"Sagan slutar så" ("Last Thing on My Mind")	Mike Stock, Peter Waterman, Sarah Dallin, Keren Woodward, Lotta Ahlin
12.	"I dina ögon"	Stefan Brunzell, Tony Johansson, Kristian Hermansson
13.	"Du ger mej livet"	Pearu Paulus, Ilmar Laisaar, Alar Kotkas, Jana Hallas, Carl Lösnitz
14.	"My Oh Ma"	Marcos Ubeda
15.	"Ett steg i natten"	Carl-Henry Kindbom, Thomas Thörnholm, Carl Lösnitz

=== 2001 bonus tracks ===
#	Title	Writer
1.	"Lyssna till ditt hjärta"	Lars Diedricson, Christer Lundh
2.	"Din första kärlek"	John Ballard

== Charts ==
Chart (2000)	Peak position
Swedish Albums (Sverigetopplistan)	17
