= Min jul =

Min jul may refer to:

- Min jul (Jan Johansen album), Swedish album 2013
- Min jul (Sanna Nielsen album), Swedish album 2013
- Min Jul (Maria Arredondo album), Norwegian album

== See also ==
- Välkommen till min jul, a 2001 album by Jan Malmsjö
