= Nina Inhammar =

- Born: Nina Karin Elise Inhammar; 22 May 1977 (age 48); Lidköping, Sweden
- Years active: 1999-2006

Nina Karin Elise Inhammar Allard (born Inhammar 22 May 1977 in Lidköping (grew also up in Svalöv and Klippan)) is a former Swedish singer. She studied music at secondary school and sang in a jazz band, and she also appeared in Hässleholmsrevyn.

Inhammar and Kim Kärnfalk were famous when they appeared in the reality show Friends på turné in 1999. Their band Friends won Melodifestivalen 2001 with the song Lyssna till ditt hjärta. When Friends split in 2002, Kärnfalk and Inhammar continued alone in their duo Nina & Kim (split in 2006).

Inhammar left the music career in 2006.

== References and sources ==
- "Nina Inhammar Allard: Jag lämnade musiken för att bli hel igen! – Hemmets journal". Hemmetsjournal.se. 16 August 2011.
- Ninna Prage. "Från Friends till Ikea – nwt.se – Ditt Värmland, just nu!". nwt.se.
