= Min jul (Jan Johansen album) =

Studio album by Jan Johansen
- Released: 6 November 2013
- Recorded: 2012, inside various church buildings
- Genre: Christmas, schlager
- Length: 44 minutes
- Label: Atenzia

Jan Johansen chronology
En ny bild av mig (2010)	Min jul (2013)

Min jul is a Christmas album by Jan Johansen, released on 6 November 2013.

== Track listing ==
1. Vit jul - (Jörgen Smedshammar)
2. Driving Home for Christmas - (Chris Rea)
3. Jul, jul, strålande jul - Gustav Nordqvist, Edvard Evers
4. Var inte rädd - Lars Moberg, Ylva Eggehorn
5. I'll Be Home for Christmas - (Walter Kent, Kim Gannon, Buck Ram)
6. Christmas Song - (Mel Tormé, Bob Wells)
7. Sista andetaget - (Thomas Thörnholm, Danne Attlerud)
8. Se på mig - (Bobby Ljunggren, Håkan Almgren, Ingela Forsman)
9. Sista söndagen i advent (Jörgen Smedshammar, David Nyström)
10. Blue Christmas - (Bil Hayes, Jay W. Johnson)
11. Have Yourself a Merry Little Christmas - (Ralph Blane, Hugh Martin)
12. Ave Maria - (Charles Gounod, Ture Rangström)

== Contributors ==
1. Jan Johansen - vocals, guitar
2. Peter Ljung - piano, keyboard
3. Britt Louise Håkansson, Nils Flink, Ulrika Bernövall, Mari Gustavsson, Arne Rhodin, Lars Renklint - (conductors)
4. Sankt Nicolai vocal ensemble, Centrumkyrkan's choir, Ramsberg church choir, Diocese of Berga choirs, Askersunds traddjazz choir, Villberg choir

== Charts ==
Chart (2014)	Peak position
Swedish Albums (Sverigetopplistan)	12
