= Vuollerim =

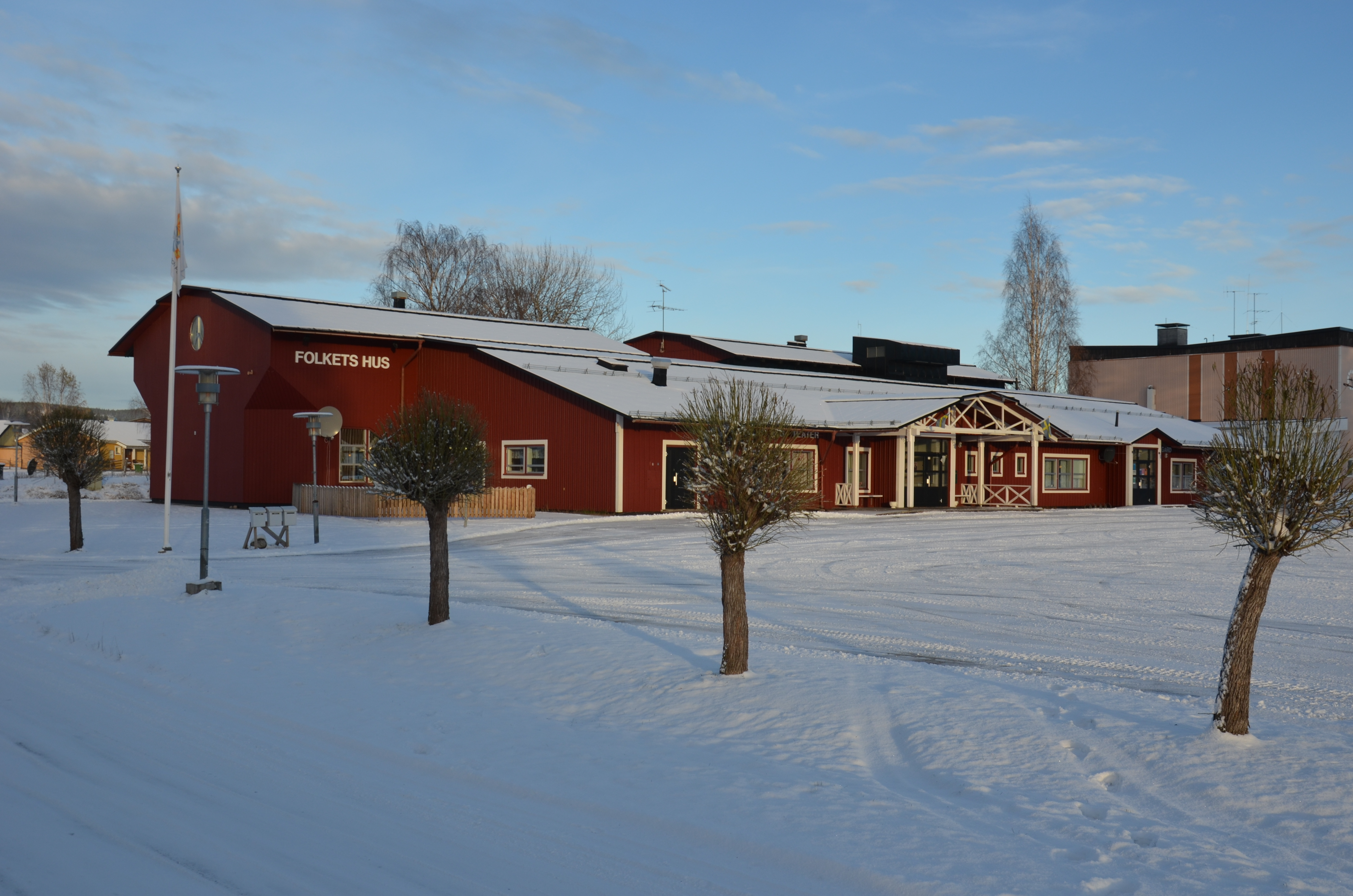

- Location within Norrbotten Location within Sweden
- Coordinates: 66°25′45″N 20°37′25″E
- Country: Sweden
- Province: Lapland
- County: Norrbotten County
- Municipality: Jokkmokk Municipality

Area
  - Total: 1.44 km^{2} (0.56 sq mi)

Population (2020)
  - Total: 623
  - Density: 432/km^{2} (1,120/sq mi)
- Time zone: UTC+1 (CET)
  - Summer (DST): UTC+2 (CEST)

Vuollerim (Swedish pronunciation: [vʉˈɔ̌lːɛrɪm]) (Lule Sami: Vuolleriebme) is a village (tätort) situated in Jokkmokk Municipality, Norrbotten County, in northern Sweden with 623 inhabitants in 2020, declining from 732 inhabitants in 2010. The name originates from Lulesamiska vuolle (lower) and riebme, which describes a place where a river runs quickly, but without rapids (often a calmer place between two sets of rapids).

Vuollerim is located at the confluence of the Lilla and Stora Lule Rivers. It is located by national road 97, which leads to Jokkmokk in the northwest and Boden in the southeast. The nearest railway station is 18 kilometers away in Murjek on the Malmbanan.

Vuollerimbopladsen, a prehistoric settlement site three kilometers northwest of the town, bears witness to the fact that the place has been inhabited since the Stone Age. The town became known for its archaeological site when it was discovered in 1983 by researchers from Umeå University. The site has been dated at 6000 years old, but is not visible above ground. However, an archaeological museum called Vuollerim 6000 has been constructed two kilometers from the site.

The first permanent settlement was built in Vuollerim in 1756, and the site has been permanently populated since then. Not until the construction of the Porsi hydroelectric power plant in 1956–61, however, would the population increased significantly.

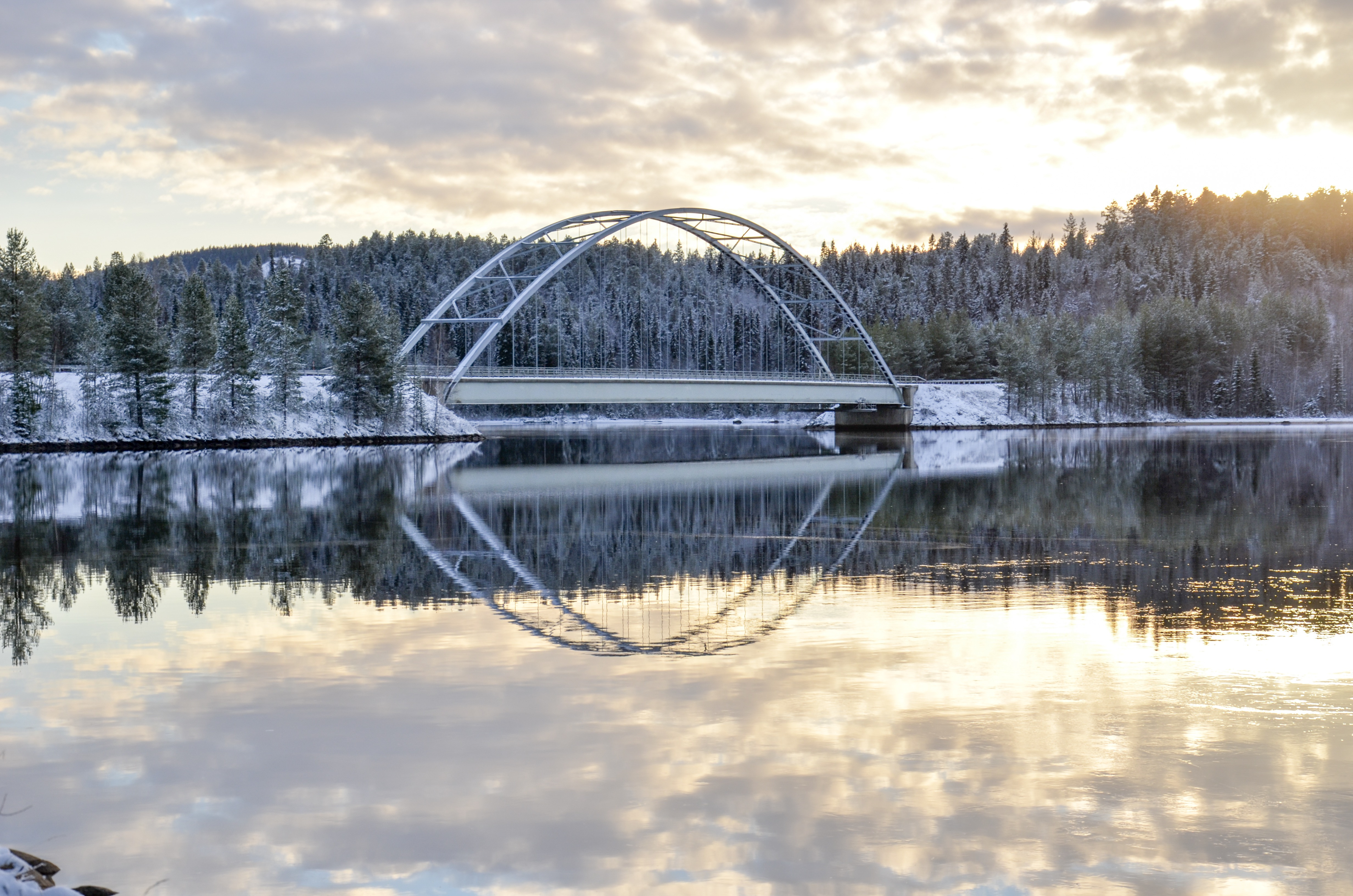
Bridge over Lule river at Vuollerim, near the village of Porsi

== Notable people ==
- Lars Albin Eriksson
- Zemya Hamilton
- Jakob Hellman
- Jokkmokks-Jokke
- Lars-Göran Nilsson
- Lilian Ryd
- Birgitta Svendén
