= Östen Eriksson =

Swedish musician

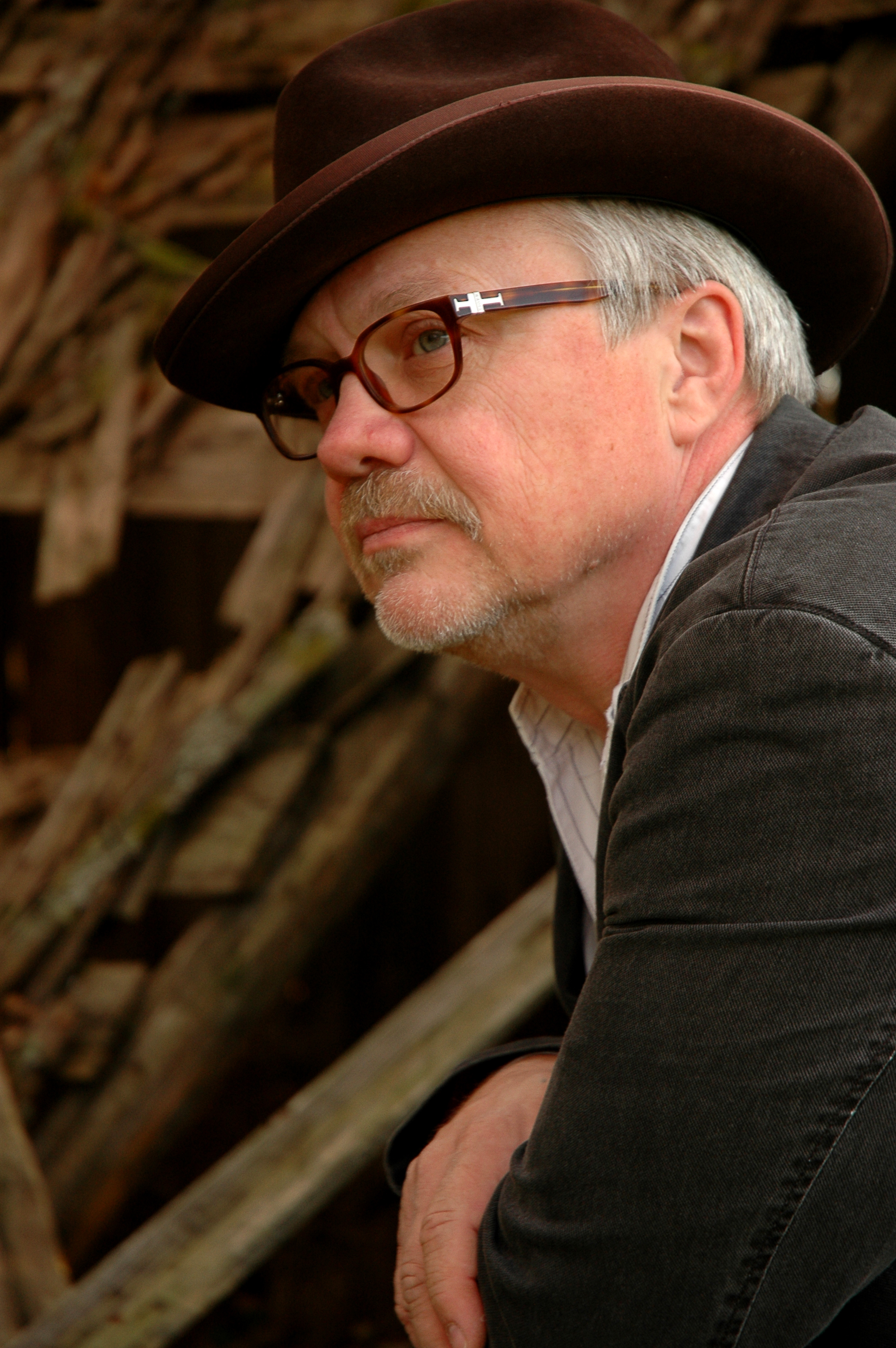
Östen Tommy Eriksson

Bror Östen Tommy Eriksson (born 1 March 1958 in Enånger, Hälsingland, Sweden) is a Swedish musician. He is member of the song group Östen med Resten and he works in the organization Hälsinge Akademi.

Eriksson started with entertainments when he was 3 years old. When he was 6 years old, he sang at Enångers bygdegård together with Jokkmokks-Jokke. He educated at Bromangymnasiet 1974–76. He released his first debut in 1976 when he played in the band Hälsingband. He worked at Iggesunds Bruk until 1980, when he wanted a new career as musician. During 5 years he was member of the group Iggesundsgänget and one of his performances was in the TV program Nygammalt together with Bosse Larsson. He told funny stories in the TV program Har du hört den förut?.
