= När jag tänker på i morgon =

2000 song by Friends

Single by Friends

from the album Blickar som tänder
- A-side: "När jag tänker på i morgon"
- B-side: "När jag tänker på i morgon" (singback version)
- Released: 13 March 2000
- Genre: dansband pop, schlager
- Label: Mariann Grammofon
- Songwriters: Ingela Forsman, Lasse Holm

"När jag tänker på i morgon" is a song written by Ingela "Pling" Forsman and Lasse Holm, and performed by Friends at Melodifestivalen 2000, where it ended up second together with the Barbados "song Se mig" .

The single, which was released the same year, peaked at 14th position at the Swedish singles chart. The song also charted at Svensktoppen for six weeks, peaking at third position, between 15 April-20 May 2000 before leaving chart.

== Charts ==
Chart (2000)	Peak position
Sweden	14
