= Never Let It Go =

2002 song by Afro-dite

Single by Afro-dite
- Released: 2002
- Songwriter: Marcos Ubeda

Eurovision Song Contest 2002 entry
- Country: Sweden
- Artists: Blossom Tainton; Gladys del Pilar; Kayo Shekoni
- As: Afro-dite
- Language: English
- Composer: Marcos Ubeda
- Lyricist: Marcos Ubeda

Finals performance
- Final result: 8th
- Final points: 72

Entry chronology
- ◄ "Listen to Your Heartbeat" (2001)
- "Give Me Your Love" (2003) ►

"Never Let It Go" is a 2002 song written by Marcos Ubeda and recorded by Swedish group Afro-dite. The song won Melodifestivalen 2002 and represented Sweden in the Eurovision Song Contest 2002, where it finished 8th out of 24 competing entries.

== Melodifestivalen and the Eurovision Song Contest ==
"Never Let It Go" participated in the second heat of the 2002 Melodifestivalen which was held on 26 January 2002 at the Himmelstalundshallen indoor arena in Norrköping. The song was performed seventh of the eight competing entries and directly qualified to the contest final as the song which received the most telephone votes. On 1 March, during the final held at the Globe Arena in Stockholm, Afro-dite were the first of the ten competing acts to perform, and "Never Let It Go" won the contest with 248 points, receiving the highest number of votes from the regional juries and the public vote.

"Never Let It Go" was performed on 25 May 2002 at the Eurovision Song Contest in Tallinn, Estonia. Sweden was drawn to perform in twelfth position of the 24 competing entries, and subsequently Afro-dite finished in eighth place, receiving 72 points in total, including the maximum 12 points from Bosnia and Herzegovina.

== Charts ==
=== Weekly charts ===
Chart (2002)	Peak position
Sweden (Sverigetopplistan)	1

=== Year-end charts ===
Chart (2002)	Position
Sweden (Sverigetopplistan)	8

== Certifications ==
In 2002, "Never Let It Go" was certified platinum in Sweden.

Preceded by "Lyssna till ditt hjärta" by Friends	Melodifestivalen winners 2002	Succeeded by "Give Me Your Love" by Fame
