= Kim Kärnfalk =

Swedish singer (born 1974)

- Born: 1 November 1974 (age 51); Uddevalla, Sweden
- Formerly of: Friends; Nina & Kim

Kim Charlott Kärnfalk Löwstedt (born 1 November 1974 in Uddevalla, Sweden) is a Swedish singer. As part of the group Friends she won Melodifestivalen 2001 and represented Sweden at the 2001 Eurovision Song Contest, where the group placed 5th. Later she paired up with her bandmate Nina Inhammar to form the duo Nina & Kim; they competed in Melodifestivalen 2004 with the song "En gång för alla", and the same year they released an album, Bortom tid och rum.

Kärnfalk came out as bisexual in 2004. In 2008, her autobiography Mamma, mormor och jag was released.

In an interview with newspaper Bohusläningen published in August 2024, Kärnfalk announced that she has Alzheimer's disease.
