= Se mig =

2000 single by Barbados

Single by Barbados
- A-side: "Se mig"
- B-side: "Show Me"
- Released: 2000
- Genre: dansband pop, schlager
- Label: Mariann Grammofon
- Songwriters: Dan Attlerud, Thomas Thörnholm

Barbados singles chronology
"Rosalita" (1999)	"Se mig" (2000)	"Happy People" (2000)

Se mig is a song written by Thomas Thörnholm and Danne Attlerud, and performed by the band Barbados at Melodifestivalen 2000, where it ended up second together with the Friends song "När jag tänker på i morgon".

The single, which was released the same year, peaked at 23rd position at the Swedish singles chart. The song also charted at Svensktoppen for three weeks between 6 May-19 August 2000, including 12 first positions before leaving chart.

== Charts ==
Chart (2000)	Peak position
Sweden (Sverigetopplistan)	23
