= Världen utanför =

Studio album by Barbados
- Released: 8 March 2002
- Genre: Modern Dansband music, Dansband pop
- Length: circa 53 minutes
- Label: Mariann Grammofon

Barbados chronology
Kom hem (2000)	Världen utanför (2002)	Rewind (2003)

Världen utanför is a studio album by Barbados, released on 8 March 2002. For the album, the band was given a Grammis Award in the "Dansband of the year" category.

== Track listing ==
1. Saturday Night at the Movies
2. Aldrig i livet
3. Sweet Little Angel (Fri)
4. Världen utanför
5. Om du vill
6. Keep On
7. Burning Love
8. Himlen var blå
9. Ung och vild
10. Den som jag vill ha
11. Stanna hos mig
12. Come Stay the Night (carnival version)
13. Har aldrig sett så mycket tårar
14. Natten kommer
15. Superstars
16. Världen utanför (J Pipe last minute disco remix)

== Chart positions ==
Chart (2002)	Peak position
Sweden	2
