= Spår i snön =

Studio album by Magnus Carlsson
- Released: 22 November 2006
- Genre: Christmas
- Length: circa 47 minutes
- Label: Warner Music Sweden

Magnus Carlsson chronology
Magnus Carlsson (2006) (2007)	Spår i snön (2006)	Live Forever – The Album (2007)

Spår i snön is the third studio album released by Swedish singer Magnus Carlsson. The album was released in November 2006 and peaked at number nine on the Swedish Albums Chart.

In 2009, the album was re-released as Spår i snön: Special Edition on the Freestar label.

== Track listing ==
=== 2006 CD ===
1. Jul igen
2. Himmel blå
3. Wrap Myself in Paper
4. Om jag stannar en stund
5. En riktig jul för oss (duet with Jessica Andersson)
6. Känn ingen oro
7. Faller ner på knä (On My Knees)
8. Julens tid är här (duet with Molly Sandén)
9. Wonderful Dreams (Holidays are Coming)
10. Välkommen hem
11. Undan vinden (duet with Barbro Svensson)
12. X-mas medley
  1. Feliz Navidad
  2. Last Christmas
  3. Santa Claus is Coming to Town
  4. Winter Wonderland
  5. Mistletoe and Wine
13. Ser du stjärnan i det blå (When You Wish upon a Star)

=== 2009 CD ===
1. Jul igen
2. Himmel blå
3. Wrap Myself in Paper
4. Om jag stannar en stund
5. En riktig jul för oss ( duet with Jessica Andersson)
6. Känn ingen oro
7. Faller ner på knä (On My Knees)
8. Julens tid är här (duet med Molly Sandén)
9. Wonderful Dreams (Holidays are Coming)
10. Välkommen hem
11. Undan vinden (duet med Barbro Svensson)
12. X-mas medley
  1. Feliz Navidad
  2. Last Christmas
  3. Santa Claus is Coming to Town
  4. Winter Wonderland
  5. Mistletoe and Wine
13. Ser du stjärnan i det blå
14. Bonus Track: O Helga Natt
15. Bonus Track: On My Knees ("Faller ner på knä", English language version)
16. Bonus Track: Undan vinden (Magnus solo version)
17. Bonus Track: Nu tändas tusen juleljus
18. Bonus Track: Ser du stjärnan i det blå ("When You Wish Upon a Star", Swedish language-version)
19. Bonus Track: Faller ner på knä (Soft version)

== Charts ==
=== Weekly charts ===
Chart (2006)	Peak position
Swedish Albums (Sverigetopplistan)	9

=== Year-end charts ===
Chart (2006)	Position
Sweden (Sverigetopplistan)	97

== Release history ==
Region	Release Date	Format	Label	Catalogue
Sweden	November 2006	Compact Disc	Mariann	5051011774850
