= Fjeld (band) =

Swedish pop group

- Origin: Sweden
- Genres: Ethnopop
- Labels: Stockholm Records
- Members: Ellinor Franzén, Pär Lönn, Åsa Brümmer

Fjeld was a pop group from Sweden.

The group reached spots between #43 and #60 on the Swedish Singles Chart in 1998 with the song "The Emigrants". Their album Coming Home charted for four weeks, peaking at #29. The song spent four weeks on Billboard's Dance Club Songs chart, debuting on 7 November 1998 and making its last entry on 8 January 1998, and peaking on #40.

The group played pop music blended with Swedish folk music. The producer Pär Lönn first tried a blend with techno music before settling on ethnical inspiration such as Enya. He recruited a singer he had previously heard in a Jönköping studio, Ellinor Franzén.

== Reception ==
Their 1998 album Coming Home received several reviews that graded the album 2 out of 5. Critics noted Fjeld's use of "Ack Värmeland Du Sköna", comparing the band to Nordman as well as Enya. Svenska Dagbladet found the refinement of Sweden's musical heritage "penurious". Fjeld played too many "sluggish eurodance rhythms" and showed a "lack of imagination beyond permission". Göteborgs-Posten gave credit to the music as being "neat and captivating", but asked if the listener would be disturbed by "exquisite cuteness and thefts from new and old". A couple of tracks were decent, wrote Expressen, but otherwise, Fjeld was marked by "an annoying poise that turns several tracks into inflated Enya-inspired blue-yellow power ballads". Länstidningen Östersund named two tracks as their favourites, whereas the rest of the album was "some sort of tame ambient pop, completely without suspense".

== Discography ==
=== Albums ===
- 1998 – Coming Home

=== Singles ===
- 1998 – "The Emigrants"
- 1998 – "Mother of Devotion"
- 1999 – "So Far Away"
