= Pop Galaxy =

Studio album by Magnus Carlsson
- Released: 29 September 2010
- Genre: Dance-pop, Europop
- Length: 1 hour, 35 minutes
- Label: Freestar

Magnus Carlsson chronology
Christmas (2009)	Pop Galaxy (2010)	Happy Holidays (2014)

Pop Galaxy is a 2010 Magnus Carlsson studio album.

== Track listing ==
CD1
The Album

1. My Galaxy (03:17)
2. The Best in Me (02:55)
3. Feel You (03:36)
4. The Kiss (04:11)
5. Keep On Dancin' (03:46)
6. A Little Respect (03:32)
7. Show Me The Way (02:57)
8. Doin' OK Doin' Alright (04:01)
9. Stronger Than Ever (03:02)
10. One Love To Give (04:15)
11. This Is Disco (Pitchline International Version) (04:22)
12. When Our Love Is Gone (03:55)
13. Take Me To Your Heart (03:17)
14. Last One To Stand (03:12)

CD2
Bonus Disc

1. Crying At The Discoteque (03:42)
2. Walking In My Shoes (03:11)
3. Money (Greedy Honey) (03:08)
4. Flash (French-language version of "One Love To Give") (04:15)
5. This Is Disco (Single Version) (03:46)
6. Feel You (Pitchline Club Remake) (06:39)
7. A Little Respect (Pitchline Remix) (06:40)
8. This Is Disco (SoundFactory Paradise Anthem) (07:04)
9. Feel You (Ruff & Jam Club Mix) (07:05)
10. Video: Feel You
11. Video: A Little Respect
12. Video: Making The Video "Feel You"

=== Digital release ===
The digital release includes the song "Slave to Love" but misses "Walking in My Shoes" and the three videos.

== Charts ==
Chart (2010)	Peak position
Swedish Albums (Sverigetopplistan)	11
