= Ingenmansland =

Single by Jan Johansen
- A-side: "Ingenmansland"
- B-side: "Ingenmansland" (instrumental version)
- Released: 2001
- Studio: Atlantis, Stockholm, Sweden
- Label: Lionheart International
- Songwriters: Ingela Forsman, Bobby Ljunggren

"Ingenmansland" is a song written by Ingela 'Pling' Forsman and Bobby Ljunggren. It was released in 2001 on Lionheart International.

Jan Johansen performed the song at Melodifestivalen 2001, attaining the fourth spot. The single was released the same year. It charted at Svensktoppen for one week, and peaked at #6 on 17 March 2001.

== Charts ==
Chart (2001)	Peak position
Sweden (Sverigetopplistan)	21
