= Friends på turné =

Studio album by Friends
- Released: 1999
- Genre: Dansband pop
- Length: 55 minutes
- Label: 4 Vision

Friends chronology
Friends på turné (1999)	Blickar som tänder (2000)

Friends på turné is the debut studio album by Swedish band Friends. It was released in 1999.

The songs "Vi behöver varann" and "Friends" charted on Svensktoppen.

== Track listing ==
#	Title	Writer
1.	"Vi behöver varann"	John Ballard
2.	"Hans blåa ögon"	Henrik Sethsson
3.	"Det finns ingen som du"	Niklas Eriksson, Jonas Ohlson, Ulf Georgsson
4.	"Ensam med dig"	Stefan Brunzell, Tony Johansson, Ulf Georgsson
5.	"Vad jag än säger dig"	Jonas Berggren
6.	"Friends"	Lars Diedricson, Ulf Georgsson
7.	"Håll om mig nu"	Carl-Henry Kindbom, Carl Lösnitz
8.	"Himlen är nära"	Lars Diedricson, Ulf Georgsson
9.	"Hennes ögon"	Lotta Ahlin
10.	"Always Have, Always Will"	Jonas Berggren, Mike Chapman
11.	"Äventyr"	Morgan Johansson, Björn Stenström
12.	"Att det i stjärnorna står skrivet"	Fredrik Möller, Jonas Warnerbring
13.	"Allt som hon gör"	Krisitian Hermansson
14.	"Hemåt i natten"	Carl-Henry Kindbom, Carl Lösnitz

== Charts ==
Chart (1999–2000)	Peak position
Swedish Albums (Sverigetopplistan)	8
