= Magnus Carlsson =

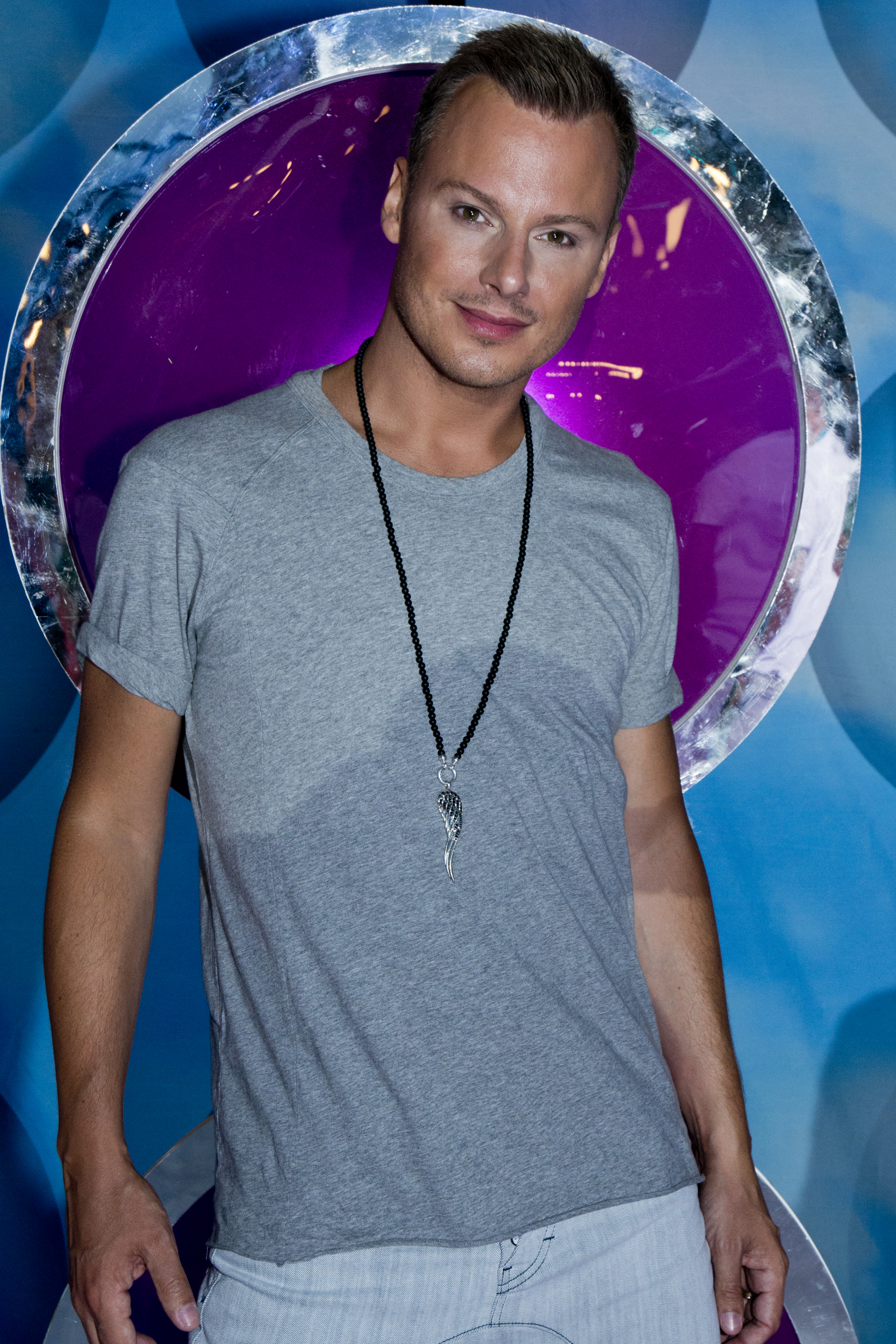

Background information
- Born: Lars Magnus Carlsson; 24 June 1974 (age 52); Fristad, Borås, Sweden
- Genres: Dansband, Pop, nu-disco, Schlager
- Occupation: Singer
- Instruments: Vocals, piano
- Years active: 1994–present
- Website: www.magnusonline.se (in Swedish)

Lars Magnus Carlsson (born 24 June 1974) is a Swedish singer and former member of the bands Alcazar and Barbados as well as a solo performer.

== Early life ==
Magnus Carlsson was born in Borås and grew up in Fristad. He attended comprehensive upper secondary school for two years with a focus on musical training, and four further years at the Faculty of Arts in University of Gothenburg, where he studied to be a music and song/voice teacher.

In 1992, Carlsson joined Swedish dansband Barbados. He left in 2002 and on 13 December 2002 he officially joined the pop-dance group Alcazar. On 24 January 2003, he performed his last concert with Barbados.

== Solo career ==
In February 2006, he was a contestant in Melodifestivalen's semi-final in Karlstad with "Lev Livet!", composed by Anders Glenmark and Niklas Strömstedt, and qualified for the final in Globen.

In 2007, Magnus performed in the third heat of Melodifestivalen 2008 in Örnsköldsvik with "Live Forever", an eighties-inspired electropop dance song. The entry came in 5th place and was knocked out of the contest but still became the 6th most frequently played song on Swedish radio in 2007. The song was released as a single on 5 March 2007 and reached the status of gold certificate.

Carlsson participated in Melodifestivalen 2015 with "Möt mig i Gamla stan" and made it to the final in Friends Arena, finishing 9th overall in 12 finalists.

== Personal life ==
Carlsson married Mats Karlsson on 29 January 2006.

== Discography ==
=== Studio albums ===
Year	Album	Peak positions	Certification
Year	Album	SWE	Certification
2001	En ny jul	17	
2006	Magnus Carlsson	3	
2006	Spår i snön	9	
2007	Live Forever – The Album	15	
2010	Pop Galaxy	11	
2014	Happy Holidays	10	
2015	Gamla stan	7	
2016	Once Upon a Christmas Night (with Jessica Andersson)	-	
2021	Atmosphere	-	

=== Compilation albums ===
Year	Album	Peak positions	Certification
Year	Album	SWE	Certification
2008	Re:collection 93-08	7	
2009	Christmas (Deluxe Edition)	14	

=== Singles ===
Year	Single	Peak positions	Album
Year	Single	SWE	Album
1995	"Madeleine"		
1995	"Nätterna Med Dig I Californien"		
1998	"Bländad Av Ett Ljus"		
2001	"Mitt vinterland"		
2002	"Finns det mirakel"		
2002	"Stilla Ro Och Nära" (Åsa Jinder with Magnus Carlsson)		
2006	"Lev livet!"	1	
2006	"Mellan vitt och svart"	2	
2006	"Wrap Myself in Paper"	2	Spår i snön
2007	"Live Forever"	3	
2007	"Another Rainbow"		
2007	"Waves of Love"	18	
2008	"Crazy Summer Nights"	4	
2008	"Walking In My Shoes"		
2008	"I Was Born This Way"	–	
2009	"YMCA"	–	
2009	"Sommar'n som aldrig säger nej" (with Wille Crafoord and Monica Dominique)	–	
2009	"This Is Disco"	3	Pop Galaxy
2010	"Feel You"	10	Pop Galaxy
2010	"A Little Respect"	12	Pop Galaxy
2010	"Mitt livs gemål" (with Charlotte Perrelli)	31	
2010	"The Best in Me"	26	Pop Galaxy
2010	"Christmas With You"	-	
2011	"The Kiss"	–	
2011	"Arrival"	–	
2011	"It's the Most Wonderful Time of the Year"	–	
2012	"People Change"	–	
2013	"Glorious"	–	
2014	"Tillsammans"	–	
2015	"Möt mig i Gamla stan"	34	Melodifestivalen 2015
2015	"Nej Nej Nej"		
2015	"Julen Med Dig "		
2016	"Ge Mig Sommar"		
2016	"Se Mig"		
2016	"En Stilla Väntan" (with Jessica Andersson)		
2017	"Sommarnatt"		
2020	"My Freedom (Officiella Stockholm Pride Anthem”		
2021	Day And Night feat Helena Paparizou		Atmosphere
