= En ny jul =

Studio album by Magnus Carlsson
- Released: 26 November 2001
- Genre: Christmas
- Label: Grammofon
- Producer: Camilla Bjering; Andreas Rickstrand; Björn Stigsson; Lars Diedricsson; Marcos Ubeda; Niklas Edberger

Magnus Carlsson chronology
En ny jul (2001)	Magnus Carlsson (2006)
Re:collection 93-08 (2008)	Christmas (2009)	Pop Galaxy (2010)

En ny jul is the debut studio album by Swedish singer Magnus Carlsson. Released in November 2001, the album, peaked at number 17 on the Swedish Albums Chart.

The album was re-released in 2009 under the title Christmas.

== Track listing ==
=== 2001 ===
1. När en stjärna faller
2. Mitt vinterland
3. It May Be Winter Outside
4. Happy X-Mas
5. Himmel i advent (No Ordinary World) (Åsa Jinder playing the nyckelharpa)
6. Finns det mirakel (duet with Elisabeth Andreassen)
7. White Christmas
8. All I Want For Christmas Is You
9. Änglarna i snön
10. Himlens alla stjärnor ser på
11. Christmas Time
12. Nu är julen här
13. Happy, Happy Year For Us All (with Alcazar & Golden Hits-ensemblen)
14. It's Just Another New Year's Eve

=== 2009 ===
1. När en stjärna faller
2. Mitt vinterland
3. It May Be Winter Outside
4. Happy X-Mas
5. Himmel i advent (No Ordinary World) (Åsa Jinder playing the nyckelharpa)
6. Finns det mirakel (duet with Elisabeth Andreassen)
7. White Christmas
8. All I Want For Christmas Is You
9. Änglarna i snön
10. Himlens alla stjärnor ser på
11. Christmas Time
12. Nu är julen här
13. Happy, Happy Year For Us All (with Alcazar & Golden Hits-ensemblen)
14. It's Just Another New Year's Eve
15. Bonus track: My Grown-Up Christmas List
16. Bonus track: Låt julen förkunna ("Happy Xmas (War Is Over)" Swedish language-version)
17. Bonus track: Jag drömmer om en jul hemma ("White Christmas" Swedish language-version)
18. Bonus track: It Is Christmas Night ("Nu är julen här" English language-version)

== Charts ==
Chart (2001)	Peak position
Swedish Albums (Sverigetopplistan)	17

== Release history ==
Region	Release Date	Format	Label	Catalogue
Sweden	26 November 2001	Compact Disc	Mariann	MLPCD 3303
Sweden	November 2009	Compact Disc	Freestar Music	FREE005-BOX
