= Ellinor Franzén =

- Born: 11 April 1978 (age 47)
- Occupation: singer

Ellinor Franzén Almlöv (born 11 April 1978) is a Swedish singer who has participated twice in Melodifestivalen first in 1996 with the song "Finns här för dig", and then in 2001 with the song "Om du stannar här". She has also been the leadsinger of the music group Fjeld. As of 2015 she works as a social secretary in Skövde.

== Discography ==
=== Singles ===
Title	Year	Peak chart positions	Album
Title	Year	SWE	Album
"Om du stannar här"	2001	37	Non-album singles
