= Gunnar Morén =

Swedish musician (born 1959)

Karl Gunnar Morén (born 21 September 1959 in Ludvika) is a Swedish musician. With his wife, he plays in Ludvika Spelmanstrio. He is concertmaster for Grängesbergs orkesterförening and plays violin in the band Östen med Resten.

== Career ==
When he was 8 years old, he started play guitar and mandolin. At 11, he played violin.
