= Henrik Olsson =

Swedish television presenter (born 1970)

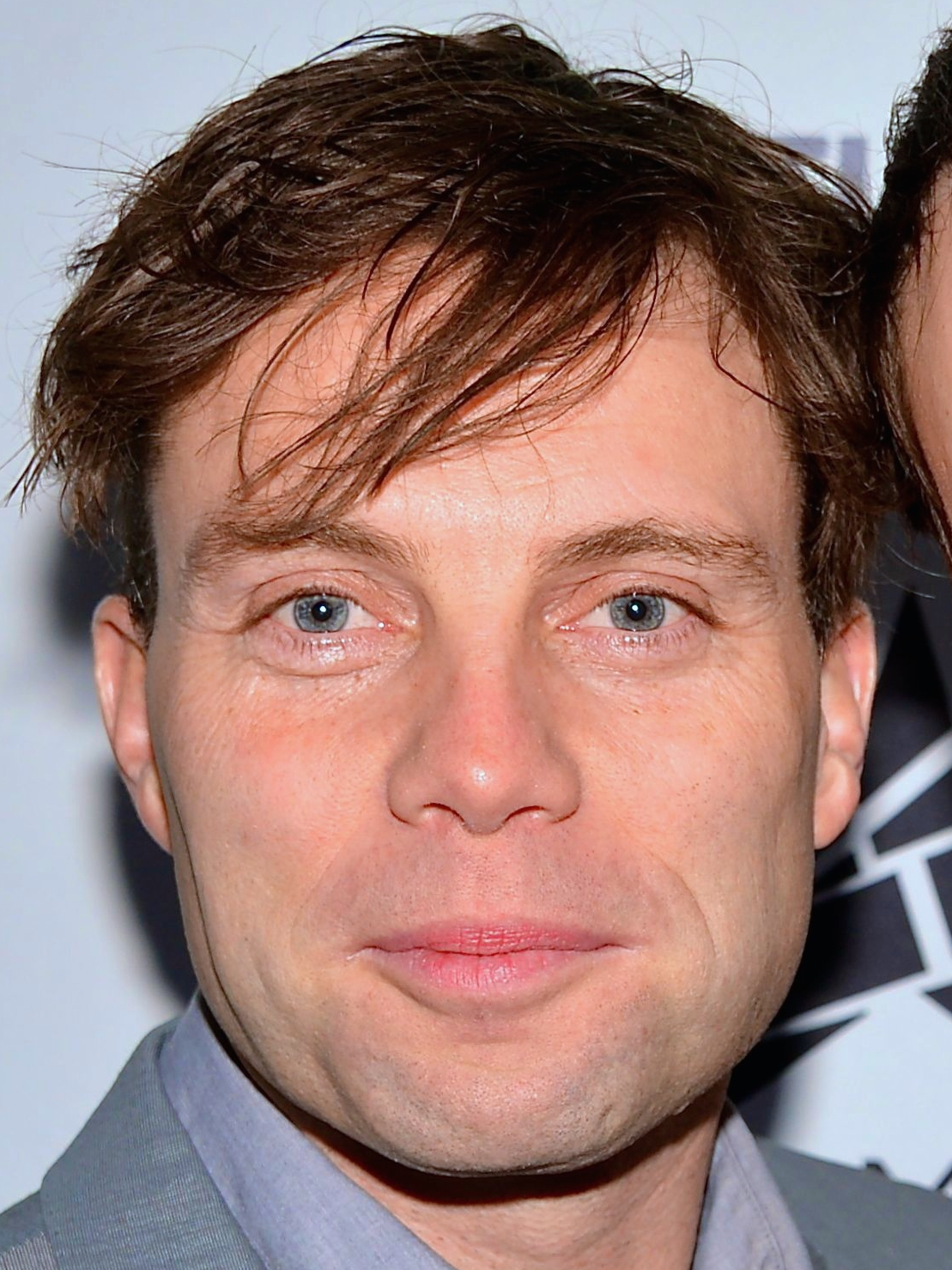
- Occupation: television presenter
- Employers: Sveriges Television; Sveriges Radio

Per Henrik Olsson (born 15 September 1970) is a Swedish television presenter who has hosted shows like SVT's Voxpop, Jupiter and Melodifestivalen 2001. He has also been a travelling reporter for the travel show Packat & klart on the same channel, and also as a reporter on the entertainment show Nöjesnytt at SVT and SVT24. There, he covered the latest news in entertainment and he also covered Melodifestivalen 2007. He has presented the radio shows Ketchup sommarlov, Nattliv, Sommartoppen and P3Mix on Sveriges Radio. Nowadays he presents at P4 Premiär, P4 Retro, and at SR P4 Stockholm.

Olsson is married to his husband Oscar Målevik and he also has a daughter with Lotta Bromé.
