= Allt som jag ser =

Single by Barbados
- A-side: "Allt som jag ser"
- Released: 2001
- Genre: dansband pop
- Label: Mariann Grammofon
- Songwriter(s): Marcos Ubeda, Ulf Georgsson, Lars Diedricson

Barbados singles chronology
"Secret" (2000)	"Allt som jag ser" (2001)	"Disco King" (2001)

"Allt som jag ser" is a song written by Marcos Ubeda, Ulf Georgsson and Lars Diedricson, and performed by Barbados at Melodifestivalen 2001, where it ended up second.

It was also released as a single the same year. At the Swedish singles chart, it peaked at 7th position. It also charted at Svensktoppen for totally six weeks between 21 April-19 May 2001, peaking at fourth position.

It was also recorded in English, as "The Power of Love".

== Charts ==
Chart (2001)	Peak /position
Sweden (Sverigetopplistan)	23
