= Happy Holidays (Magnus Carlsson album) =

Studio album by Magnus Carlsson
- Released: 12 November 2014
- Genre: Christmas
- Label: Lighthouse

Magnus Carlsson chronology
Pop Galaxy (2010)	Happy Holidays (2014)	Gamla stan (2015)

Happy Holidays is a 2014 Magnus Carlsson Christmas album.

== Track listing ==
1. Chestnuts Roasting on an Open Fire (The Christmas Song)
2. The Man With The Bag
3. Snow Song
4. This Christmas Night
5. Mary, Did You Know?
6. Christmas Auld Lang Syne
7. Let There Be Light
8. O Holy Night (Cantique de Noël)
9. Home
10. White Christmas
11. Happy Holidays Medley
12. O Helga Natt (Cantique de Noël, bonus)

== Charts ==
Chart (2014)	Peak position
Swedish Albums (Sverigetopplistan)	10
