= Dance with Me (Friends album) =

Studio album by Friends
- Released: 30 September 2002
- Genre: modern dansband music, dansband pop
- Length: 48 minutes
- Label: Mariann

Friends chronology
Blickar som tänder (2000)	Dance with Me (2002)	Best of Friends (2003)

Dance with Me is a 2002 studio album by Friends. The album released was originally postponed from May to later during the year.

The song "In the Heat of the Night" charted at Svensktoppen in February 2003.

== Track listing ==
#	Title	Writer
1.	"In the Heat of the Night"	Carl-Henry Kindbom, Carl Lösnitz
2.	"The One That You Need"	Henrik Sethsson, Pontus Assarsson
3.	"I Won't Let You Go"	Agnetha Fältskog, Eric Stewart
4.	"Love Did It"	Thoms G:son, Amy Powers
5.	"Dance With Me"	Tommy Gunnarsson, Tommy Kaså, Elisabeth Lord
6.	"I Believe In Love"	Jens Lundvik, Per-Olof Thyrén, Stefan Almqvist
7.	"Just Like a Hurricane"	Thomas Eriksson, Stefan Ohlsson
8.	"Om igen"	Henrik Sethsson, Pontus Assarsson
9.	"Är det inte så (Ain't that Just the Way)"	Bruce Belland, Glen Larson, Stu Phillips, Ingela Forsman
10.	"Färger"	Patric Jonsson, Ulf Georgsson, Niklas Jarl
11.	"Say You Will"	Henrik Sethsson, Thoms G:son
12.	"Sent plan hem" ("Next Plane Out")	Diane Warren, Kim Kärnefalk
13.	"Öppna dina ögon"	Dan Attlerud, Jörgen Ringqvist, Martin Klaman
14.	"Calling Out Your Name"	Patrik Linman, Joakim Kulju, Ola Larsson, Fredrik Hult

== Charts ==
Chart (2002)	Peak position
Swedish Albums (Sverigetopplistan)	15
