= Magnus Carlsson (album) =

Studio album by Magnus Carlsson
- Released: 26 April 2006
- Genre: Schlager
- Length: 51 minutes
- Label: Sony BMG Music Entertainment
- Producer: Anders Glenmark

Magnus Carlsson chronology
En ny jul (2001)	Magnus Carlsson (2006)	Spår i snön (2006)

Magnus Carlsson is the second studio album by Magnus Carlsson. The album was released in April 2006 and peaked at number 3 on the Swedish charts.

== Track listing ==
1. Som om inget hänt
2. Discodåre
3. Då talar kärleken sitt språk
4. Mellan vitt och svart
5. I mina händer
6. Det största av allt
7. Lev livet!
8. Som din himmel ger mitt hav
9. Mitt hjärta, ta mitt hjärta
10. Funnit min ängel
11. Det måste va med dig
12. Jag ser dig, jag ser dig, jag ser dig

== Contributors ==
- Magnus Carlsson - singer
- Ola Gustavsson - guitar
- Christer Jansson - drums, percussion
- Anders Glenmark - keyboard, bass, guitar, producer
- Stockholm Session Strings - musicians

== Charts ==
Chart (2006)	Peak position
Swedish Albums (Sverigetopplistan)	3

== Release history ==
Region	Release Date	Format	Label	Catalogue
Sweden	26 April 2006	Compact Disc	Sony BMG	8287684255
