= Staffan Lindfors =

Karl Alf Staffan Lindfors (born 26 December 1968 in Kårböle, Sweden) is a Swedish musician, songwriter and producer, best known as bassist in the band Östen med Resten (since 1994) and Sofia Karlsson's band.
