= Javiera Muñoz =

Swedish singer (1977–2018)

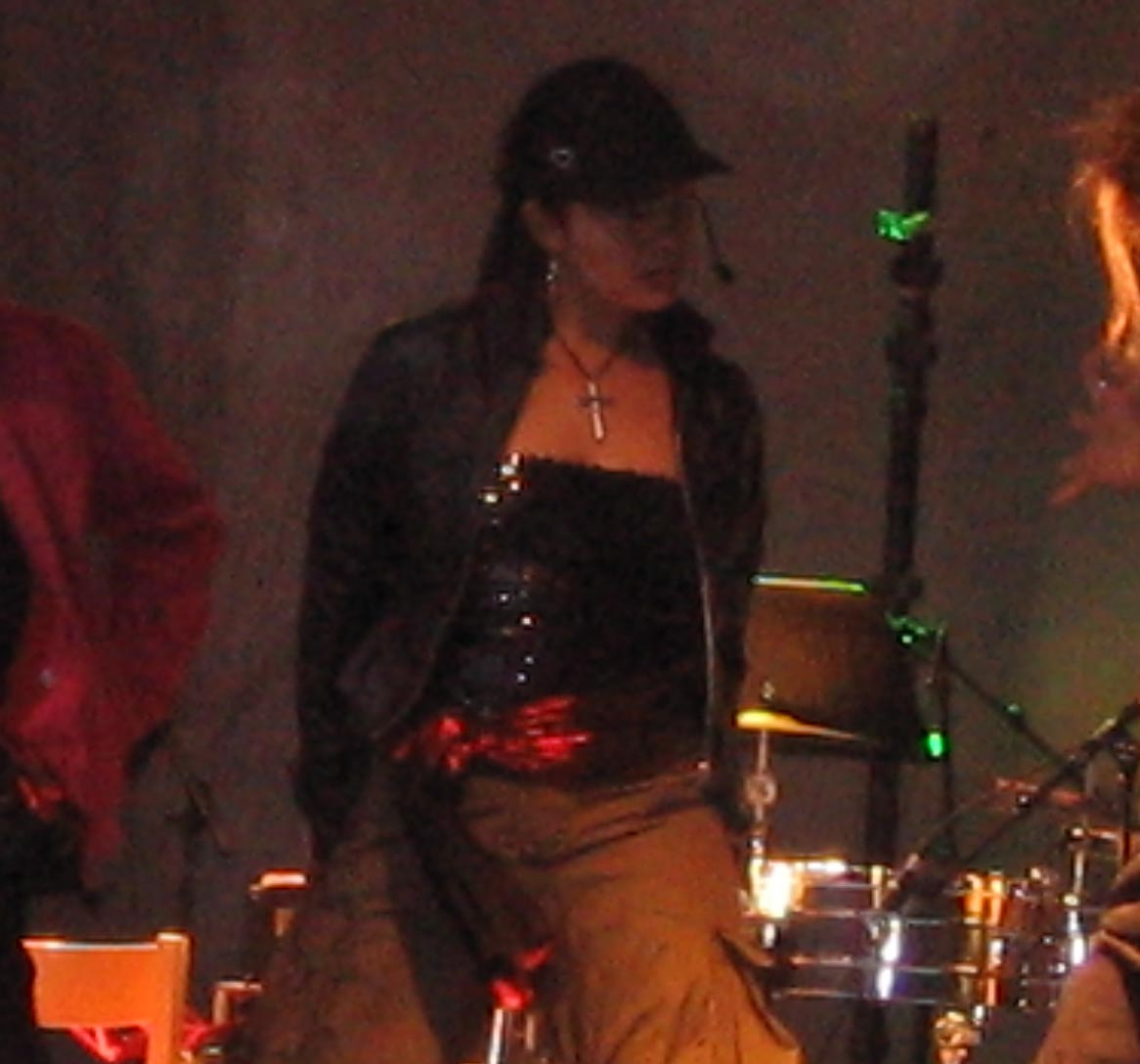
- Muñoz performing live, 2006

Background information
- Birth name: Javiera Margarita Odija Ubal Muñoz
- Born: 28 May 1977; Motala, Sweden
- Died: 16 January 2018 (aged 40); Gothenburg, Sweden
- Genres: Latin pop
- Occupation: Singer

Javiera Margarita Odija Ubal Muñoz (28 May 1977 – 16 January 2018) was a Swedish singer with Chilean-Spanish roots who participated in Melodifestivalen twice, in 2000 with "Varje timma, var minut", and in 2002 with "No hay nada más". She died after having struggled for ten years with anorexia nervosa.

== Discography ==
=== Albums ===
- Javiera (2001)
- True Love (2004)

=== Singles ===
- "Spanish Delight" (2001)
- "No hay nada más" (2002)
- "Will You Remember Me" (2002)
- "Line of Fire" (2005)
