= Hon kommer med solsken =

Single by Östen med Resten
- A-side: "Hon kommer med solsken"
- B-side: "Till mitt eget Blue Hawaii"
- Released: 2002
- Genre: Folk; Schlager
- Label: Warner
- Songwriters: Larry Forsberg; Sven-Inge Sjöberg; Lennart Wastesson

Hon kommer med solsken (She comes with sunshine) is a song written by Larry Forsberg, Lennart Wastesson and Sven-Inge Sjöberg. Swedish folk music band Östen med Resten performed this song at Melodifestivalen 2002, where it finished on 10th place. It peaked at 38th place on Sverigetopplistan and the B-side consisted of a cover version of Vikingarna's Till mitt eget Blue Hawaii. The song has also been placed on Svensktoppen, with 2nd place as the best, 6 April–3 August 2002, but failed on 10 August.
