= Live Forever – The Album =

Studio album by Magnus Carlsson
- Released: 4 July 2007
- Genre: Pop, Disco
- Length: 44 minutes
- Label: Warner Music Sweden

Magnus Carlsson chronology
Spår i snön (2006)	Live Forever – The Album (2007)	Re:collection 93-08 (2008)

Live Forever – The Album is the fourth studio album by Swedish nu-disco artist Magnus Carlsson. The album was released on 4 July 2007 and peaked at number 8 on the Swedish charts.

== Track listing ==
1. Crazy Summer Nights
2. I Won't Cry
3. Waves of Love
4. Nothing's Real
5. Another Rainbow
6. Give a Little Love
7. Never Walk Away
8. Live Forever
9. I Need Your Love
10. Don't You Worry
11. You
12. Boogie Time
13. Live Forever (acoustic studio version)

== Charts ==
Chart (2007)	Peak position
Swedish Albums (Sverigetopplistan)	8

== Release history ==
Region	Release Date	Format	Label	Catalogue
Sweden	July 2007	Compact Disc	Warner Music	5051442232929
