= Listen to Your Heartbeat =

2001 song by Friends

Single by Friends

from the album Listen to Your Heartbeat
- Language: English
- Released: 2001
- Length: 3:06
- Label: Mariann Grammofon
- Songwriter(s): Ditmar Daniel; Henrik Sethsson; John Terra; Thomas G:son

Music video
- "Listen to Your Heartbeat" on YouTube

Eurovision Song Contest 2001 entry
- Country: Sweden
- Artist(s): Friends
- Language: English
- Composer(s): Thomas G:son; Henrik Sethsson
- Lyricist(s): Thomas G:son; Henrik Sethsson

Finals performance
- Final result: 5th
- Final points: 100

Entry chronology
- ◄ "When Spirits Are Calling My Name" (2000)
- "Never Let It Go" (2002) ►

Official performance video
- "Listen to Your Heartbeat (Grand Final Performance)" on YouTube

"Listen to Your Heartbeat" (originally released as "Lyssna till ditt hjärta"; Swedish pronunciation: [ˈlʏ̂sna tɪl dɪt ˈjæ̂ːʈa]) is a 2001 song by Swedish pop band Friends. The song represented Sweden in the Eurovision Song Contest 2001 after winning Melodifestivalen 2001, the Swedish national final for the Eurovision Song Contest.

== Eurovision Song Contest ==
=== Melodifestivalen 2001 ===
Melodifestivalen 2001 was the selection for the 41st song to represent Sweden at the Eurovision Song Contest. It was the 42nd time that this system of picking a song had been used. 1,567 songs were submitted to SVT for the competition, of which 10 were chosen to compete in the show. In the contest, "Listen to Your Heartbeat" would earn first in both the jury and televote, earning a total of 237 points.

=== At Eurovision ===
In a Q&A from February 24, 2001, Friends announced that the song would be performed in English for the Eurovision Song Contest 2001.

The song was performed 7th on the night of the contest, following Russia's Mumiy Troll with "Lady Alpine Blue" and preceding Lithuania's SKAMP with "You Got Style". The song received 100 points, placing 5th in a field of 23.

== Plagiarism controversy ==
Before the contest, the songwriters were accused of plagiarism, with some claiming that the song had plagiarized "Liefde is een kaartspel", Belgium's entry for the Eurovision Song Contest 1996, with "Listen to Your Heartbeat" facing disqualification. After "Listen to Your Heartbeat" won Melodifestivalen 2001, Agneta Thigerström, project manager of Sveriges Television Malmo said that "there is nothing to worry about and nothing that can change Friends' victory. And nothing will happen now."

On February 23, 2001, Björn Kjellman, in an interview on show P4, spoke about the similarities between the two songs. On the same day, Kris Boswell, host of Radio Sweden, played the song for judges at the Melodifestivalen 2001 after-party, to which most replied "It's just a coincidence".

On March 1, 2001, Swedish newspaper Aftonbladet ran a poll asking readers if they thought the song was plagiarism. The vote came to around 70% saying that they thought the song plagiarized "Liefde is een kaartspel". On a Belgian TV special in February 2001, Lisa del Bo, the singer of "Liefde is een kaartspel", voiced her opinion, saying that "It's very similar indeed, but I don't think it was active plagiarism. It might be on purpose." The EBU Reference Group eventually ordered that the matter had to be settled in court, with the song eligible to compete if the court did not find any evidence of plagiarism.

In 2003, it was announced that after Belgian music association SABAM had determined that the song was plagiarism. Composers of "Listen to Your Heartbeat", Thomas G:son and Henrik Sethsson, both denied the allegations, but after both SABAM and the lyricists and composers of "Liefde is een kaartspel" threatened a trial, the Swedish delegation eventually came up with a monetary settlement.

== Critical reception ==
Per Bjurman, a writer for Aftonbladet, praised the song, saying that the song was "a hit of international caliber".

== In popular culture ==
A Japanese translation of the song, sung by Prière, can be heard as the opening for the anime series Di Gi Charat Nyo! from 2003.

Preceded by "När vindarna viskar mitt namn" by Roger Pontare	Melodifestivalen winners 2001	Succeeded by "Never Let It Go" by Afro-dite
