= Date (band) =

- Origin: Sweden
- Genres: Dansband music
- Years active: 1993–present

Date is a modern dansband from Sweden. The band was established in 1993.

== Melodifestivalen ==
The band has participated at Melodifestivalen.

- 2001: Om du förlåter mig, 6th in the final
- 2002: Det innersta rummet, 4th in the semifinal, Vinnarnas val
- 2005: Hörde änglarna viska ditt namn, 7th in the semifinal

== Discography ==
=== Albums ===
- Kvällens sista dans – 2000
- Allt mina ögon ser – 2001
- Sjunde himlen – 2004
- Här och nu! – 2010
- A Date with the 60's – 2012

== Svensktoppen songs ==
- "Österäng" – 1997
- "Sofie" – 1997
- "Alexandra" – 2001
- "Om du förlåter mig" – 2001
- "Allt mina ögon ser" – 2001
- "Det innersta rummet" – 2002

=== Failed to enter chart ===
- "Kvällens sista dans" – 1999
- "One night in Rio" – 2000
- "Kom o gör mig galen" – 2002
- "Hörde änglarna viska ditt namn" – 2005
- "Ta mig till månen" – 2011
