= Blossom Tainton-Lindquist =

Swedish singer, dancer, publisher, fitness coach and personal trainer

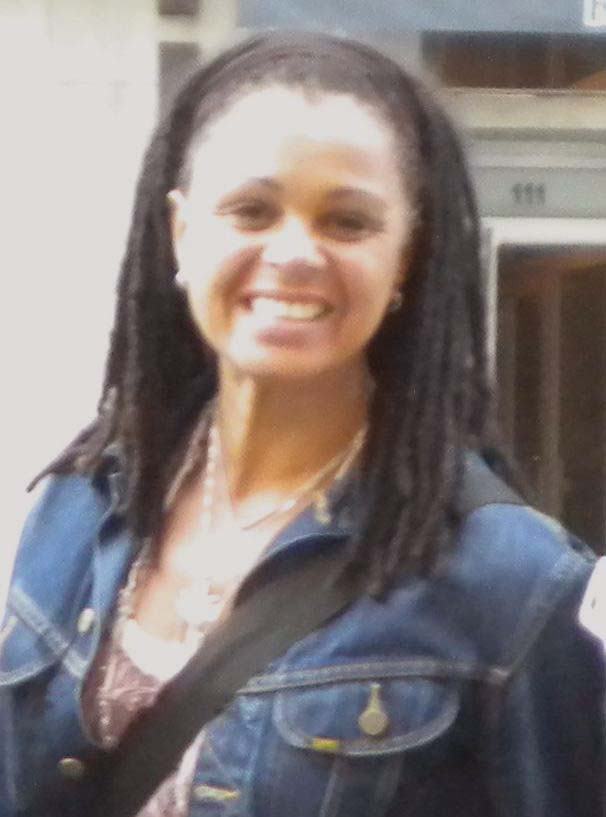
- Tainton Lindquist på Södermalm i Stockholm i maj 2011
- Born: 29 June 1962; Hedvig Eleonora and Oscar Parish

Blossom Alexandra Liliana Tainton-Lindquist (born 29 June 1962) is a Swedish singer, dancer, publisher, fitness coach and personal trainer.

She was born in Stockholm. Her father, Graham Tainton, is a choreographer. Tainton danced and sang at an early age. She attended Adolf Fredrik's Music School in Stockholm. She featured in musicals and had a very short career as a solo artist. In 2002 she represented Sweden in the Eurovision Song Contest as a member of Afro-dite with the song "Never Let It Go", and finished eighth. The group released an album, and the single "Never Let It Go" stayed in the Swedish chart for 17 weeks, peaking at No. 1.

As of 2011, Tainton worked as a personal trainer, and has released training videos, books and (2010–2011) the monthly publication Blossom Magazine. She also performs with Afro-dite, as the group still does small tours and occasional concerts.

She has previously hosted her own fitness program, Toppform on SVT as well as being featured in various entertainment television shows such as Jackpotkväll and Så ska det låta among others.

On Christmas Eve 2005, Tainton was the Christmas host on SVT.

== Personal life ==
Her father is South African-born choreographer Graham Tainton, best known for his work with ABBA. He is Black and left South Africa due to apartheid.
