= Sylvia Vrethammar =

Swedish singer (born 1945)

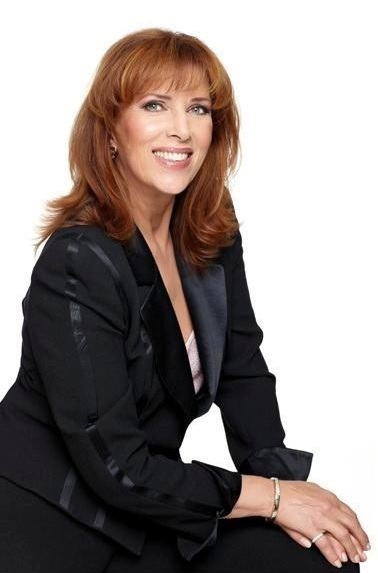
- Vrethammar in 2012

Background information
- Born: Eva Sylvia Vrethammar; 22 August 1945 (age 81); Uddevalla, Sweden
- Genres: Traditional pop, jazz, schlager
- Occupation: singer
- Years active: 1962–present
- Labels: Polydor, Sonet, Pid Records

Eva Sylvia Vrethammar (born 22 August 1945) is a Swedish traditional pop and jazz singer.

Vrethammar was born in Uddevalla, Sweden. She is the daughter of Harald Vrethammar, an education official, and Britta Vrethammar, a musical education teacher, specializing in the piano.

In 1969, she released a Swedish-language cover version of Dusty Springfield's "Son of a Preacher Man", entitled "En lärling på våran gård".

In the 1970s, she occasionally appeared as guest singer with the Bert Kaempfert orchestra, singing in English. After a series of tribute concerts in Germany in 2006 and 2008, where she returned to the bandleader's music with ex-Kaempfert trombonist Jiggs Whigham and other former orchestra members (playing as the HR Big Band), in 2012, she recorded numbers from the tours.

She is perhaps best known for the 1974 release, "Y Viva España," an English adaptation of the Dutch language "Eviva España," first recorded by the Belgian singer Samantha (Christiane Bervoets). It reached No. 4 in the UK Singles Chart in September 1974, spending over six months in the charts. The song also peaked at number No. 67 in Australia in 1975. She was known in the UK and Australia simply as Sylvia. Globally her version alone sold over one million copies, and was awarded a gold disc.

She took part in Melodifestivalen 2002, singing "Hon är en annan nu". She participated again in Melodifestivalen 2013 in the hope of representing Sweden in the Eurovision Song Contest 2013 which was held in Malmö. She sang her song "Trivialitet" in the fourth semi-final, which was also held in Malmö. She came seventh and was therefore eliminated from the contest.

== Discography ==
- Tycker Om Dej (Sonet, 1969)
- Sylvia (Sonet, 1970)
- Dansa Samba Med Mej (Sonet, 1971)
- Gamla Stan (Sonet, 1972)
- Jag Sjunger for Dej (Sonet, 1973)
- Y Viva Espana (Sonet, 1973)
- Pa Nya Bacchi (Sonet, 1974)
- Stardust & Sunshine (Sonet, 1975)
- Somebody Loves You (Sonet, 1976)
- Frei Wie Wind Und Wolken (Metronome, 1977)
- SyLeenden I Regn (Sonet, 1977)
- Als War' Nichts Geschehen (Metronome, 1978)
- Chateau (Sonet, 1979)
- Bert Kaempfert (Polydor, 1982)
- In Goodmansland (Sonet, 1983)
- Rio de Janeiro Blue (Sonet, 1985)
- OM 18 Ar Og Myndig (Fair Play Music, 1989)
- Frau Im Besten Mannesalter (Papagayo, 1989)
- Oppna Dina Ogon (Sonet, 1990)
- Ladylike (Papagayo, 1991)
- Sylvia Vrethammar with Erik Petersens Quartet (Music Partner, 1994)
- Something My Heart Might Say (Four Leaf Clover, 1995)
- Samstag Nacht (Papagayo, 2002)
- Faller for Dej (Sonet, 2002)
- Champagne (Sonet, 2006)
- Musik (Papagayo, 2013)
- Trivialitet (EMI, 2013)
- The Girl from Uddevalla (Chaos, 2017)

=== Charting singles ===
Title	Year	Peak chart positions	Album
Title	Year	SWE	Album
"Trivialitet"	2013	54	
