= Östen med Resten =

Swedish band

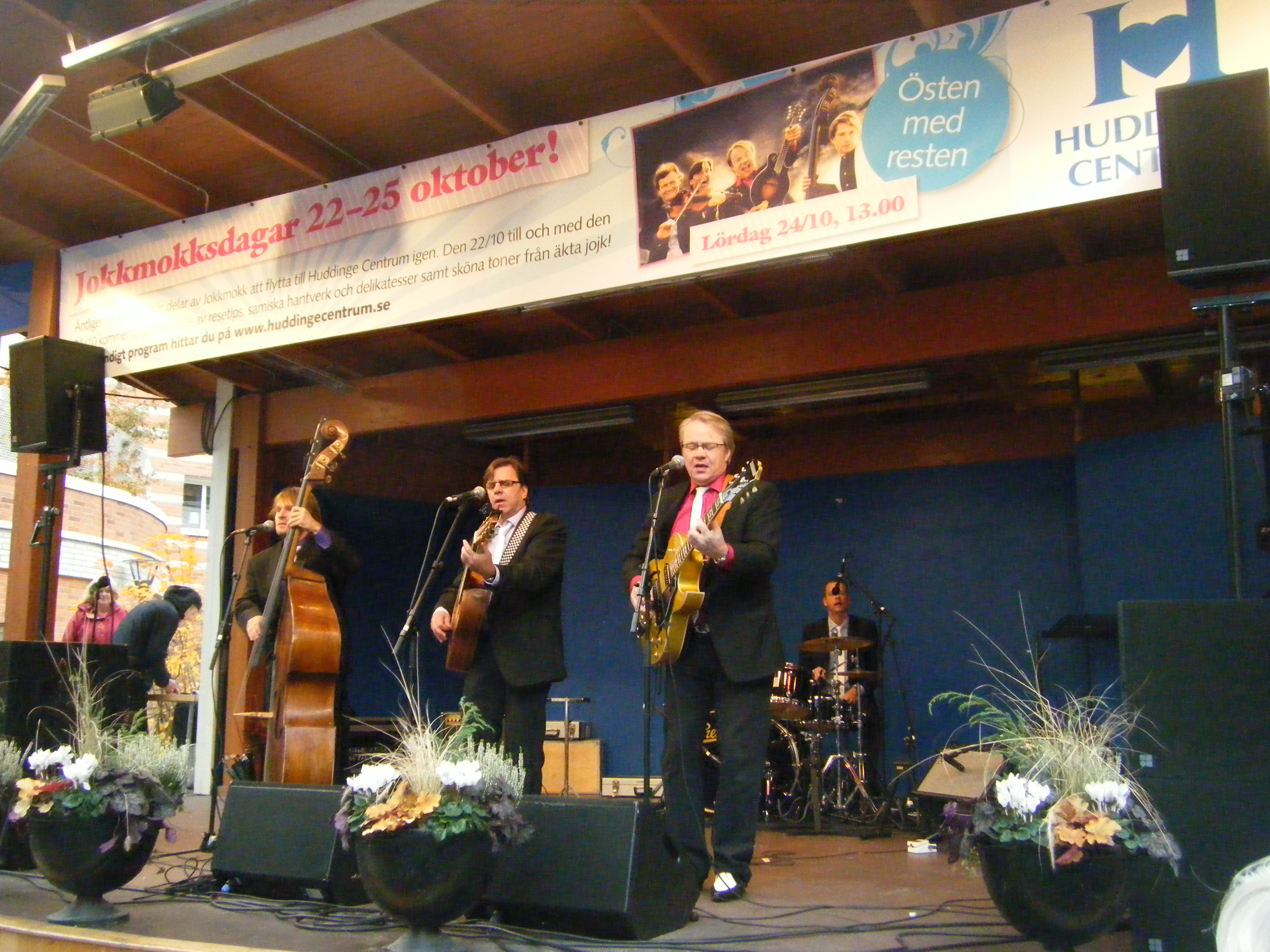
- Östen med Resten at Huddinge Centrum

Background information
- Origin: Hälsingland, Sweden
- Genres: Acoustic, Pop, Schlager, Folk
- Years active: 1985–present
- Members: Östen Eriksson; Jens Kristensen; Staffan Lindfors; Gunnar Morén
- Past members: Nisse Damberg; Peppe Lindholm; Tord Nyman; Bengan Janson

Östen med Resten (sometimes spelt Östen mä Resten) is a Swedish music group from Hälsingland. It was formed in 1985. The original members were Östen Eriksson, Jens Kristensen and Nisse Damberg. The name, which literally means "Östen with the rest", was coined by Lasse Berghagen in 1986, when the band was to perform in Järvsö together with the singer Lill-Babs. It is a pun on "Östen med Rösten" (Östen with the voice), which was the sobriquet of Östen Warnerbring.

In 1994–95, Östen med Resten hosted a television entertainment show called Östen direkt on SVT. They have participated in Melodifestivalen several times: in 2002 with the song Hon kommer med solsken, in 2003 with Maria, and in 2006 with Ge mig en kaka till kaffet.
