= Sweden in the Eurovision Song Contest 2001 =

- Eurovision Song Contest 2001
- Participating broadcaster: Sveriges Television (SVT)
- Country: Sweden
- Selection process: Melodifestivalen 2001
- Selection date: 23 February 2001

Competing entry
- Song: "Listen to Your Heartbeat"
- Artist: Friends
- Songwriters: Thomas G:son; Henrik Sethsson

Placement
- Final result: 5th, 100 points

Participation chronology

Sweden was represented at the Eurovision Song Contest 2001 with the song "Listen to Your Heartbeat", written by Thomas G:son and Henrik Sethson, and performed by the group Friends. The Swedish participating broadcaster, Sveriges Television (SVT), selected its entry through Melodifestivalen 2001.

== Before Eurovision ==
=== Melodifestivalen 2001 ===
Melodifestivalen 2001 was the selection for the 41st song to represent Sweden at the Eurovision Song Contest. It was the 42nd time that this system of picking a song had been used. Around 1,800 songs were submitted to Sveriges Television (SVT) for the competition, of which 10 were chosen to compete in the show. The final was held in the Malmö Musikteater in Malmö on 23 February 2001, presented by Josefine Sundström and Henrik Olsson, and was broadcast on SVT1. The winners were the previous year's runner-up, the group Friends with the schlager song "Lyssna till ditt hjärta". It was written by Thomas G:son and Henrik Sethson.

Competing entries
Artist	Song	Songwriter(s)
Annie Kratz-Gutå	"Vända om"	Tony Malm, Annie Kratz-Gutå, Farhad Zand
Barbados	"Allt som jag ser"	Marcos Ubeda, Ulf Georgsson, Lars "Dille" Diedricson
Date	"Om du förlåter mig"	Sofia Lagerström, Henrik Sethsson
Ellinor Franzén	"Om du stannar här"	Tony Malm, Ellinor Franzén
Friends	"Lyssna till ditt hjärta"	Thomas G:son, Henrik Sethson
Jan Johansen	"Ingenmansland"	Ingela "Pling" Forsman, Bobby Ljunggren
Popson	"Jag känner dig"	Lars Benckert, Petter Gunnarsson
Rosanna Jönis	"Om du var här hos mig"	Mattias Reimer, Lars Edvall
Sanna Nielsen	"I går, i dag"	Bert Månson
Teresia	"Kom ner på jorden"	Rune Gardell

Final – 23 February 2001
R/O	Artist	Song	Jury	Televote		Total	Place
R/O	Artist	Song	Jury	Votes	Points	Total	Place
1	Teresia	"Kom ner på jorden"	25	14,631	0	25	8
2	Jan Johansen	"Ingenmansland"	63	20,244	44	107	4
3	Date	"Om du förlåter mig"	35	17,870	22	57	6
4	Rosanna Jönis	"Om du var här hos mig"	2	17,107	11	13	10
5	Barbados	"Allt som jag ser"	82	82,799	110	192	2
6	Sanna Nielsen	"I går, i dag"	84	64,903	88	172	3
7	Annie Kratz-Gutå	"Vända om"	29	11,499	0	29	7
8	Friends	"Lyssna till ditt hjärta"	105	96,380	132	237	1
9	Popson	"Jag känner dig"	23	7,559	0	23	9
10	Ellinor Franzén	"Om du stannar här"	25	24,416	66	91	5

Detailed Regional Jury Voting
R/O	Song	Luleå	Umeå	Sundsvall	Falun	Stockholm	Karlstad	Örebro	Norrköping	Växjö	Gothenburg	Malmö	Total
1	"Kom ner på jorden"	4		1	1	2	4	1	4	6		2	25
2	"Ingemansland"	6	8	6	6	6	2	8	12	2	6	1	63
3	"Om du förlåter mig"	2		12	2	1	6	4			2	6	35
4	"Om du var här hos mig"									1	1		2
5	"Allt som jag ser"	10	4	8	10	12	8	6	2	8	4	10	82
6	"I går, i dag"	8	12	4	4	4	12	12	8		12	8	84
7	"Vända om"		2			8	1	2		12		4	29
8	"Lyssna till ditt hjärta"	12	10	10	12	10	10	10	1	10	8	12	105
9	"Jag känner dig"	1	6						6		10		23
10	"Om du stannar här"		1	2	8				10	4			25

== At Eurovision ==
For the Eurovision Song Contest 2001, the song was rewritten into English and got the new title "Listen to Your Heartbeat". It was performed in the 7th spot on the night of the contest, following Russia and preceding Lithuania. Despite not receiving any 12s, Sweden scored 100 points at the close of voting, finishing in 5th position.

The contest was broadcast on SVT1 (with commentary by Henrik Olsson) and on radio station SR P4 (with commentary by Carolina Norén and Björn Kjellman)

=== Controversy ===
After the song "Lyssna till ditt hjärta" won Melodifestivalen 2001, it was accused of plagiarism from the 1996 Belgian entry "Liefde is een kaartspel". At first this was denied by the Swedish composers, Thomas G:son and Henrik Sethsson, but after the Belgian songwriters and the author's organisation SABAM pressed for legal action, a cash settlement was agreed.

=== Voting ===
Points awarded to Sweden
Score	Country
12 points	
10 points	Denmark
8 points	Ireland; Israel; Malta; Turkey; United Kingdom
7 points	Estonia; Iceland
6 points	Latvia
5 points	Poland; Portugal; Spain
4 points	Croatia
3 points	Bosnia and Herzegovina
2 points	France; Lithuania; Norway; Russia
1 point	

Points awarded by Sweden
Score	Country
12 points	Greece
10 points	Denmark
8 points	Estonia
7 points	Slovenia
6 points	France
5 points	Spain
4 points	Bosnia and Herzegovina
3 points	Malta
2 points	Poland
1 point	Lithuania
