= Jan Johansen (singer) =

Swedish singer

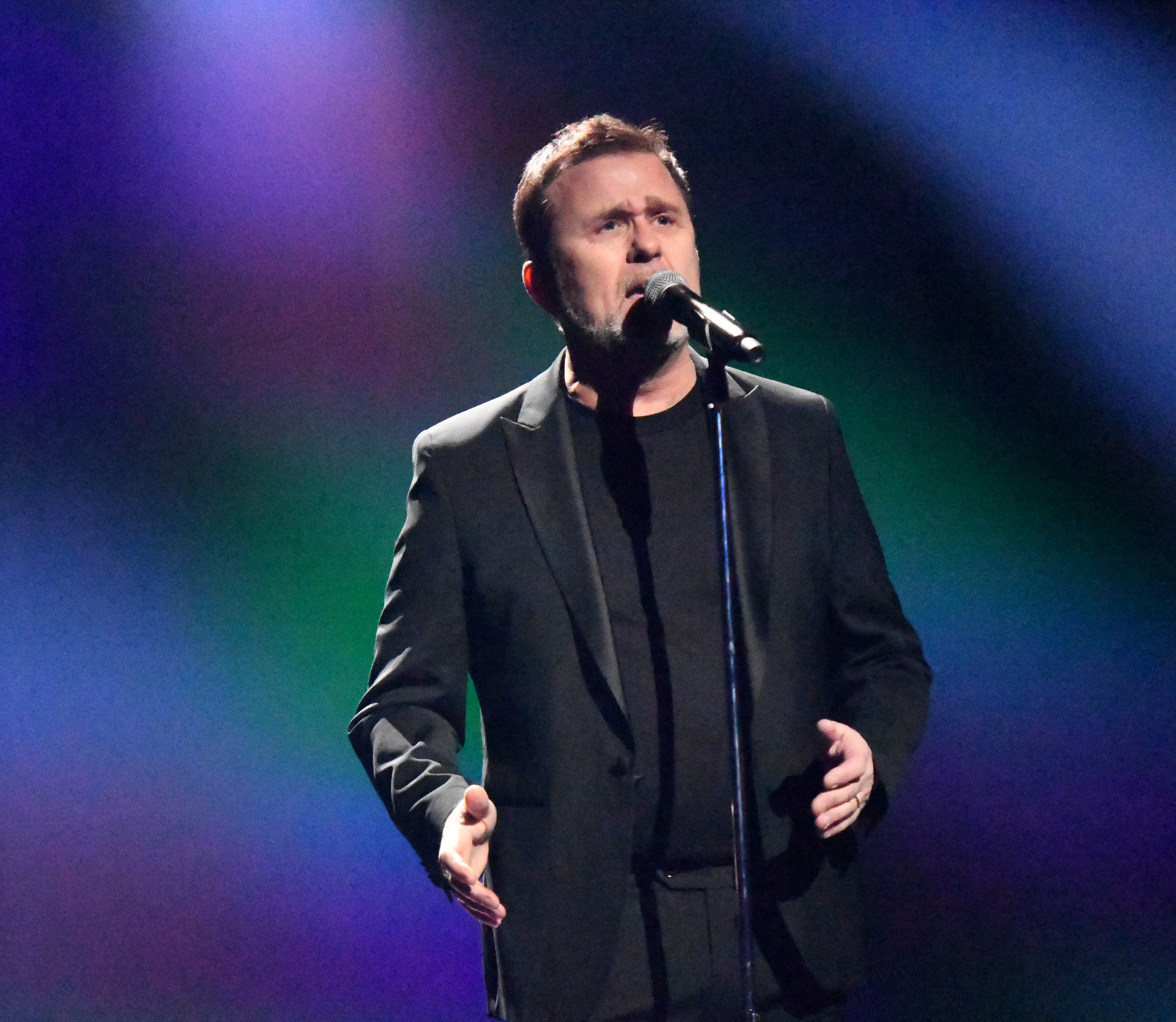
- Jan Johansen in 2020
- Born: Jan Christian Johansen; 9 January 1966 (age 59); Stockholm, Sweden
- Occupation: Singer
- Parent(s): Egil Johansen (father); Ellen Böbak (mother)

Jan Christian Johansen (born 9 January 1966) is a Swedish singer, best known for representing Sweden in the Eurovision Song Contest 1995 with the song "Se på mig".

== Life and career ==
Born in Stockholm, Sweden, Johansen is the son of Norwegian parents Egil Johansen, a jazz musician, and Ellen Böbak, a jazz singer. He began his musical career as a drummer, but later chose to become a singer.

Johansen won Melodifestivalen 1995 with the song "Se på mig", and represented Sweden in the Eurovision Song Contest 1995. During the final in Dublin, he finished in third place, scoring a total of 100 points. The song peaked at no. 1 on the Swedish Sverigetopplistan charts for a total of fifteen weeks.

On 23 February 2001, Johansen competed in the final of Melodifestivalen 2001. He placed 4th with his song "Ingenmansland". Later that year, it was announced that Johansen would be competing in Melodifestivalen 2002 with the song "Sista andetaget". After qualifying to the final through the Winners' Choice round, he finished in 7th place.

In 2003, in collaboration with Pernilla Wahlgren, Johansen competed in Melodifestivalen for a third consecutive year with the song "Let Your Spirit Fly". The song qualified from the first semi-final, later placing second in the final behind Fame.

In 2013, Johansen published his autobiography, Med nya ögon, in collaboration with Colette van Luik.

In 2014, Johansen collaborated with the Swedish producer Tord "Diztord" Bäckström to record and release the song "Some Things", which was released on Diztord's album "I Am".

Alongside Linnea Henriksson, he performed his song "Se på mig" during the interval of the first semi-final of Melodifestivalen 2020. Whilst preparing for his performance, Johansen entered negotiations with Sveriges Television (SVT) to perform the competing entry "Miraklernas tid", as the original artist, Thorsten Flinck, was disqualified from the competition. On 3 February, it was confirmed that Johansen would compete in the contest. He was eliminated in the second semi-final, finishing in last place with a total of 8 points.

In 2021, Johansen was elected into the Melodifestivalen Hall of Fame. After the coronavirus pandemic cancelled Johansen's gigs, including an anniversary concert at the Vasateatern, he started working as a substitute teacher of music at Vattmyraskolan in Järfälla.

== Discography ==
=== Studio albums ===
List of studio albums, with selected details
Title	Details	Peak positions		Certification
Title	Details	SWE	NOR	Certification
Johansen	Released: April 1995; Label: Lionheart (LHCD105)	2	34	SWE: Gold
2	Released: October 1996; Label: Lionheart (LHCD107)	23	22	
Roll Tide Roll (with The Brazz Brothers)	Released: 1997; Label: Lionheart (LHCD108)	–	–	
Hela Vägen Fram	Released: April 2002; Label: Lionheart Records (LHICD0007)	29	–	
X My Heart	Released: May 2003; Label: M&L Records (MLCD004)	44	–	
En Ny Bild av Mig	Released: September 2010; Label: Cosmos (334 25683)	–	–	
Min Jul	Released: November 2013; Label: Atenzia Records (ATZ 1340)	12	–	
Trumslagarens Pojke	Released: June 2016; Label: Tilia Records (TRCDA0009)	–	–	

=== Charted compilation albums ===
List of charted compilation albums, with selected details
Title	Details	Peak positions	
Title	Details	SWE	NOR
Fram till Nu	Released: April 2001; Label: Lionheart Records (LHICD 0004)	36	23
Minnen	Released: 2009; Label: Slagerfabrikken (2711873)	–	7

=== Charted singles ===
List of charted singles, with selected chart positions
Title	Year	Chart positions		Album
Title	Year	SWE	NOR	Album
"Se på mig"	1995	1	7	Johansen
"Mitt hjärta i din hand"	1996	51	—	2
"Kommer tid, kommer vår" (with Jill Johnson)	1996	38	13	2
"Ingenmansland"	2001	21	—	Fram till Nu
"Sista andetaget"	2002	13	—	Hela Vägen Fram
"Let Your Spirit Fly" (with Pernilla Wahlgren)	2003	10	—	X My Heart
"Röd mustang"	2005	16	—	Non-album singles
"Röd mustang" (remix)	2006	24	—	Non-album singles
"Cyanid"	2010	19	—	En Ny Bild av Mig

Awards and achievements
Preceded by Marie Bergman and Roger Pontare with "Stjärnorna"	Sweden in the Eurovision Song Contest; 1995	Succeeded by One More Time with "Den vilda"
