= Världen utanför (song) =

Single by Barbados

from the album Världen utanför
- A-side: "Världen utanför"
- Released: 2002
- Genre: dansband pop
- Label: Mariann Grammofon
- Songwriters: Calle Kindbom, Thomas G:son

Barbados singles chronology
"Disco King" (2001)	"Världen utanför" (2002)	"Ung och vild" (2002)

Världen utanför is a song written by Calle Kindbom and Thomas G:son, and performed by Barbados during Melodifestivalen 2002, participating in the first semifinal in Växjö on 19 January 2002, from where it made it further through "Vinnarnas val" and finally to the finals inside the Stockholm Globe Arena, where it ended up 4th.

The song appeared on the band's album with the same name.

The single, which was released the same year, peaked at 14th position at the Swedish singles chart, and the song became a major hit.

The song also charted at Svensktoppen for three weeks between 13-27 April 2002, peaking at 5th position before leaving chart.

== Charts ==
Chart (2002)	Peak position
Sweden (Sverigetopplistan)	14
