= Jokkmokks-Jokke =

Swedish musician (1915–1998)

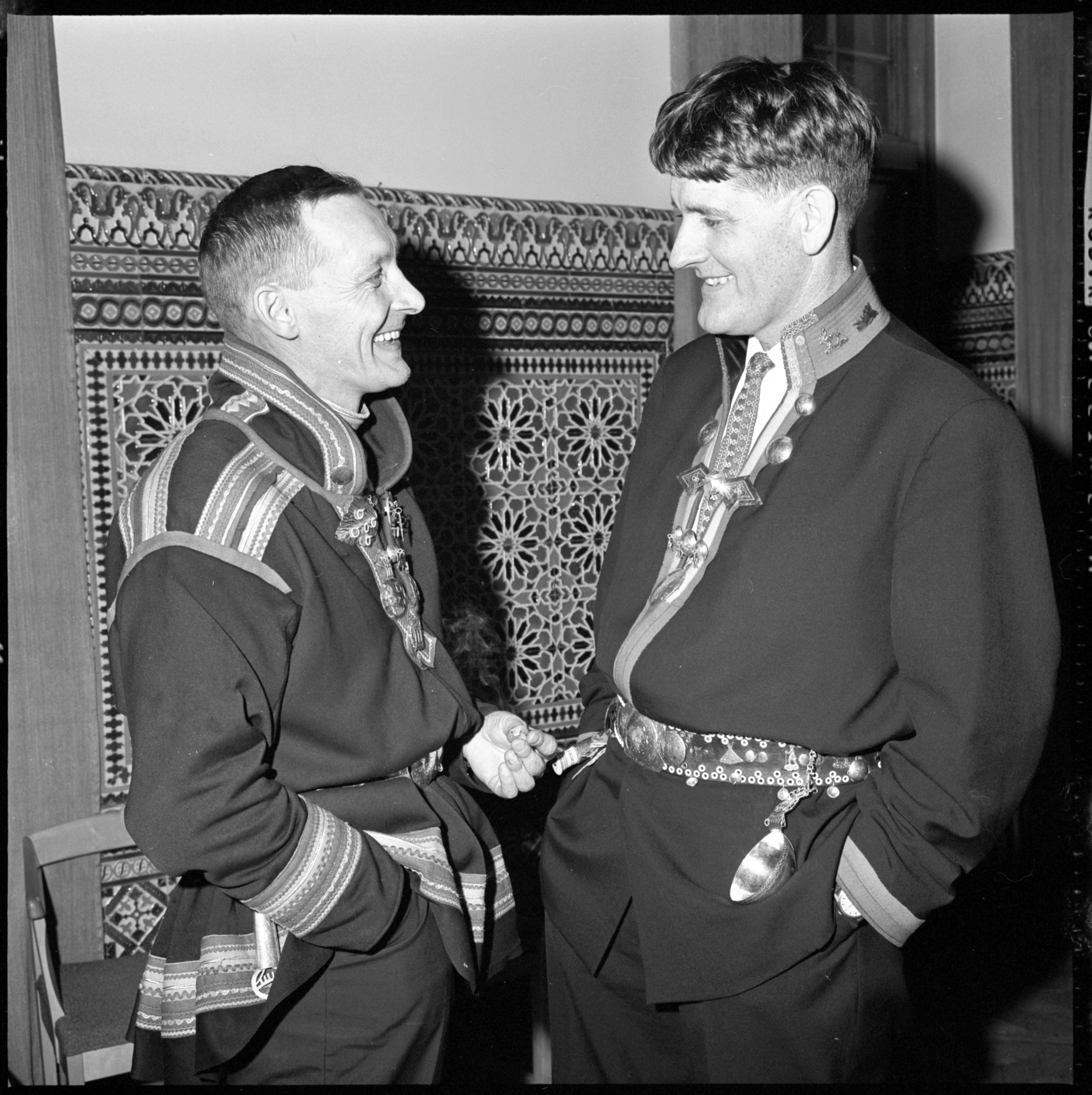

Background information
- Also known as: Bengt Djupbäck

Bengt Djupbäck (20 May 1915 – 15 June 1998), better known as Jokkmokks-Jokke, was a Swedish musician who had his greatest successes during the 1960s and 1970s.

He was born in the small village of Porsi in Jokkmokk Municipality as Bengt Simon Johansson, but changed his surname to Djupbäck in 1974. After he had been working as a railway navvy as well as a woodman, Jokkmokks-Jokke travelled to Stockholm to begin his career as a musician in 1954, and at the same time his friend gave Jokkmokks-Jokke his stage name. In Stockholm he was discovered by Topsy Lindholm, the manager of the entertainment establishment Nationalpalatset a.k.a. Nalen, where Jokkmokks-Jokke's Sami clothing was an exotic feature in the Swedish capital. In 1963, Jokkmokks-Jokke composed the song "Gulli-Gullan", which became his greatest hit ever, and which is also the song that most people remember him for. Jokkmokks-Jokke has performed "Gulli-Gullan" on stage in Japan and also in United States, during his American tour which took place in 1973. Jokkmokks-Jokke was never baptised or confirmed but he was active in church throughout his entire life. He also did a lot of charity work.
