= Live Forever (Magnus Carlsson song) =

Single by Magnus Carlsson

from the album Live Forever – The Album
- A-side: "Live Forever"
- Released: 5 March 2007
- Genre: disco, pop
- Label: M&L Records
- Songwriter(s): Thomas Thörnholm, Michael Clauss, Danne Attlerud

Magnus Carlsson singles chronology
"Wrap Myself in Paper" (2006)	"Live Forever" (2007)	"Waves of Love" (2007)

"Live Forever" is a song written by Thomas Thörnholm, Michael Clauss and Danne Attlerud, and performed by Magnus Carlsson at Melodifestivalen 2007. Participating in the semifinal in Örnsköldsvik on 17 February 2007, it ended up 5th, which meant it was knocked out.

It also appeared on his 2007 album Live Forever – The Album.

However, the song, which on 5 March 2007 was released as a single, became a major hit in Sweden following Melodifestivalen. It entered Svensktoppen on 11 March 2007 at number 5 and charted at Svensktoppen for a total of six weeks. It also charted at Trackslistan.

During Melodifestivalen 2012, the song was part of the pause event "Tredje chansen".

== Single track listing ==
1. Live Forever (Original Version)
2. Siempre estaré a tu lado (Spanish Version)
3. J'ai vivrai (French Version)
4. Live Forever (Soundfactory Radio Edit)
5. Live Forever (Soundfactory Eternal Club Mix)
6. Live Forever (Soundfactory Damnation Club Mix)

== Chart positions ==
=== Weekly charts ===
Chart (2007)	Peak position
Sweden (Sverigetopplistan)	3

=== Year-end charts ===
Chart (2007)	Position
Sweden (Sverigetopplistan)	10
