= Sista andetaget =

Single by Jan Johansen
- A-side: "Ingenmansland"
- B-side: "Ingenmansland" (instrumental version)
- Released: 2002
- Label: Lionheart
- Songwriters: Dan Attlerud, Thomas Thörnholm

Sista andetaget is a song written by Dan Attlerud and Thomas Thörnholm. Jan Johansen performed the song at Melodifestivalen 2002, where it made it from the fourth competition in Falun, through Andra chansen, to the Swedish final, where it ended up 7th.

The single was released the same year. and peaked at 13th position at the Swedish singles chart.

The song also charted at Svensktoppen, entering on 30 March 2002 spending nine weeks charting there before being knocked out.

At Dansbandskampen 2009, the song was performed by 90's Avenue.

== Charts ==
Chart (2002)	Peak position
Sweden (Sverigetopplistan)	13
