= Afro-dite =

Swedish pop group

Afro-Dite
- Origin: Sweden
- Genres: Disco
- Years active: 2002–2008, 2011-present
- Members: Kayo Shekoni; Blossom Tainton-Lindquist; Gladys del Pilar
- Past members: Jessica Folcker

Afro-dite is a Swedish pop group consisting of Blossom Tainton-Lindquist, Gladys del Pilar, and Kayo Shekoni. The name is a play on words implying that they are Black and as beautiful as the Greek goddess Aphrodite.

- Blossom had already been in show business for a long time. She is a singer and dancer who has appeared in several musicals and hosted TV shows on Swedish television.
- Gladys, who was born in Ecuador, came to Sweden when she was seven years old. She worked with Dr. Alban and Denniz Pop, but her breakthrough came when she appeared in ABBA – The True Story.
- Kayo is a singer, actress, TV show host and model. In the 1980s, she sang with the pop group Freestyle and in the 1990s, she fronted the Eurodance project Le Click.

Afro-dite came together to perform the song "Never Let It Go" for the Eurovision Song Contest 2002. The song was originally meant to be sung by Alcazar, who declined it. At Eurovision, Afro-dite finished in eighth place.

In 2007, they released a new album.

In 2012, they made another attempt to qualify for Eurovision with the song "The Boy Can Dance", but were eliminated in the first semi-final of Melodifestivalen.

In 2015, member Kayo Shekoni departed the group and was replaced by pop singer Jessica Folcker. Folcker left the group in 2022, when Shekoni returned.

== See also ==
- List of Swedes in music

Preceded by Friends with "Listen to Your Heartbeat"	Sweden in the Eurovision Song Contest; 2002	Succeeded by Fame with "Give Me Your Love"
