= Barbados (band) =

Swedish dansband

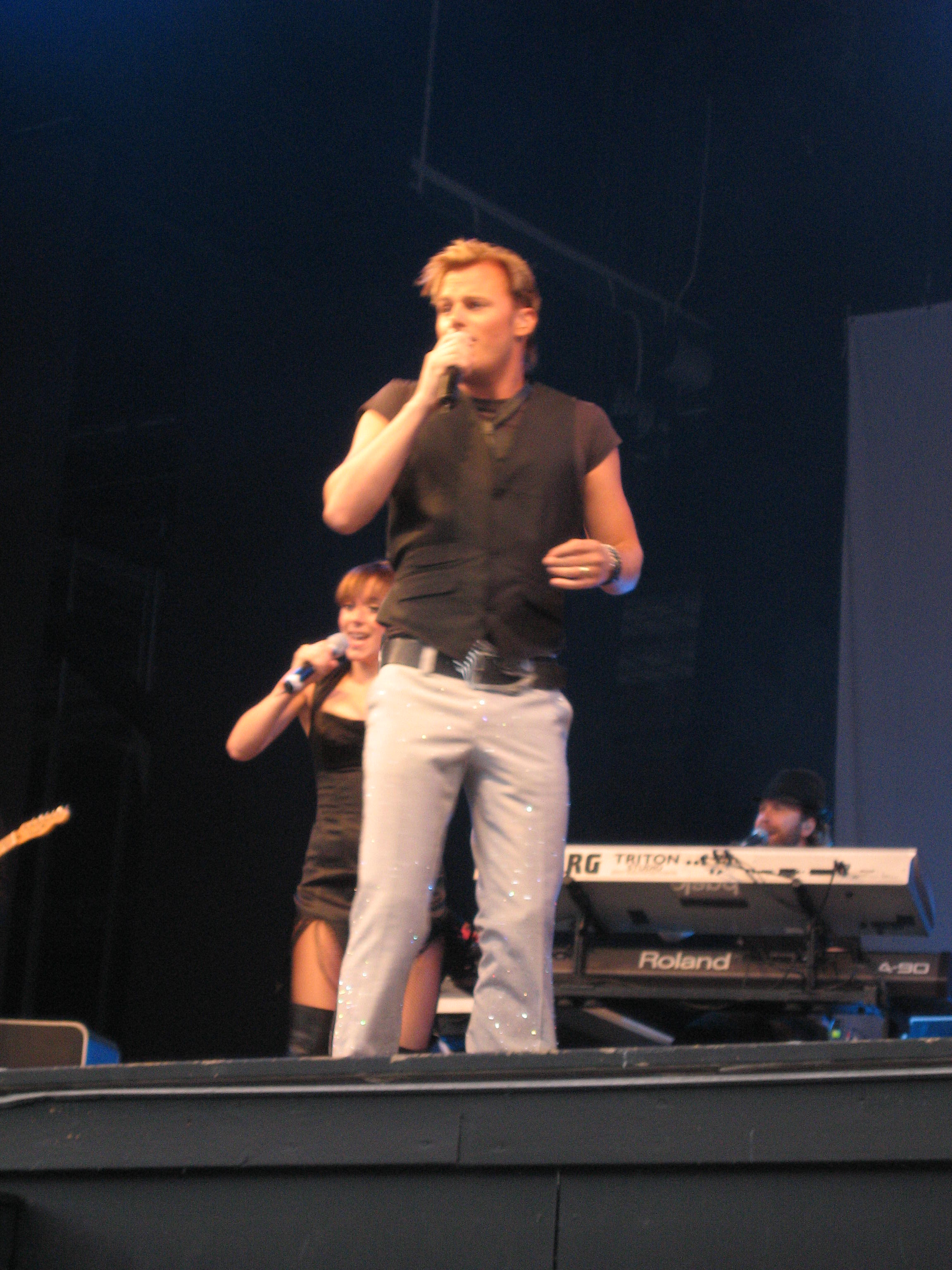

Background information
- Origin: Gothenburg, Sweden
- Genres: Dansband
- Years active: 1992–present

Barbados is a Swedish dansband, formed in 1992, who have had several Swedish chart successes. The band, with lead singer Magnus Carlsson, became widely known after their second place in Melodifestivalen 2000. The band has replaced lead singer three times. First Magnus Carlsson left the group in 2002 and later became a member of the group Alcazar. Mathias Holmgren, a former Fame Factory student was the new lead singer, but was forced to leave the band in 2004. Chris Lindh replaced him, before leaving the band in 2007. The current lead singer is Björn Lagerström.

The band won its first Grammis Award in February of the year 2000.

== Melodifestivalen ==
The band has participated in the Melodifestivalen music contest four times:

- 2000: Se mig, placed second
- 2001: Allt som jag ser, placed second
- 2002: Världen utanför, placed fourth
- 2003: Bye, Bye, placed tenth and last

Both lead singer Mathias Holmgren and Magnus Carlsson have participated in Melodifestivalen as solo singers.

== Discography ==
=== With Magnus Carlsson ===
- 1994: Barbados
- 1997: The Lion Sleeps Tonight
- 1998: Nu kommer flickorna
- 1999: Belinda
- 1999: Rosalita
- 2000: Kom hem
- 2000: When the Summer is Gone
- 2002: Världen utanför

=== With Mathias Holmgren ===
- 2003: Hela himlen

=== With Chris Lindh ===
- 2005: Stolt

=== Collections ===
- 2001: Collection 1994-2001
- 2003: Rewinder
- 2005: The Best of Barbados
- 2009: Upp til dans (Expressen)

Preceded by (Finland) Anna Eriksson	OGAE Second Chance Contest winner 2001	Succeeded by (Spain) David Bisbal
