= Friends (Swedish band) =

Swedish pop band

- Origin: Sweden
- Genres: Dansband
- Years active: 1999–2002
- Past members: Stefan Brunzell; Tony Haglund; Kristian Hermanson; Nina Inhammar; Kim Kärnfalk; Peter Strandberg

Friends was a Swedish dansband or pop group formed in 1999 and made up of Stefan Brunzell, Tony Haglund, Kristian Hermanson, Nina Inhammar, Kim Kärnfalk and Peter Strandberg. They were put together from auditions on the reality television show Friends på turne (Friends on Tour), made by Bert Karlsson for TV4. The show was a success and Friends competed on Melodifestivalen 2000, reaching second place. They won Melodifestivalen 2001 with "Lyssna till ditt hjärta" and represented Sweden at the Eurovision Song Contest 2001 with the English version of the song, "Listen to Your Heartbeat.” Following their Eurovision participation, the Swedish delegation was forced to pay royalties to the team behind "Liefde is een kaartspel", the 1996 Belgian entry, making the song the first admitted case of plagiarism in Eurovision history.

The band split in 2002, with Inhammar and Kärnfalk forming their own duo Nina & Kim. In 2004, they attempted to represent Sweden with their song “En Gång För Alla” but came 7th in the second pre-selection round. After 2006, Kärnfalk continued as a solo artist.

== Discography ==
=== Albums ===
List of albums, with selected chart positions
Title	Album details	Peak chart positions
Title	Album details	SWE
Friends på turné	Released: October 1999; Format: CD; Label: 4 Vision	8
Blickar som tänder Lyssna till ditt hjärta	Released: October 2000; Format: CD; Label: Mariann; Note: released in 2001 as Lyssna till ditt hjärta	17
Listen to Your Heartbeat	Released: May 2001; Format: CD; Label: Mariann	3
Dance with Me	Released: October 2002; Format: CD; Label: Mariann	15

=== Charting singles ===
List of singles, with selected chart positions
Title	Year	Chart positions	Album
Title	Year	SWE	Album
"Vi behöver varann"	1999	25	Friends på turné
"Vad jag än säger dig"	2000	48	Friends på turné
"När jag tänker på i morgon"	2000	14	Blickar som tänder
"Holiday"	2000	42	Blickar som tänder
"En liten röst"	2001	41	non album single
"Lyssna till ditt hjärta"/"Listen to your Heartbeat"	2001	4	Blickar som tänder (re-release)
"I'd Love You to Want Me"	2001	32	Listen to Your Heartbeat
"The One That You Need"	2002	24	Dance with Me
"Dance with Me"	2002	52	Dance with Me
"What If" (with Darin)	2009	51	Flashback

Awards and achievements
Preceded by Roger Pontare with "When Spirits Are Calling My Name"	Sweden in the Eurovision Song Contest; 2001	Succeeded by Afro-dite with "Never Let It Go"
