= Tu trouveras... 10 ans de succès (Best of) =

Compilation album by Natasha St-Pier
- Released: 27 November 2009 (France)
- Genre: Pop
- Length: 78:11
- Label: Sony BMG France

Natasha St-Pier chronology
Natasha St-Pier (2008)	Tu trouveras... 10 ans de succès (2009)	Bonne nouvelle (2012)

Singles from Tu trouveras... 10 ans de succès (Best of)
- 1. "L'instant T" Released: 27 September 2009

Tu trouveras... 10 ans de succès is the first "best of" compilation album released in France by Canadian singer Natasha St-Pier. It was released on 27 November 2009. One of the new songs, "L'instant T", was released as the first single on 27 September 2009. An English version of "L'instant T", entitled "Trade It All", is also included on the album.

The compilation album was recommended in the "French Music Blog".

== Track listing ==
1. "Tu trouveras" (4:59) (from De l'amour le mieux)
2. "L'Instant T" (4:23) (previously unreleased)
3. "Je n'ai que mon âme" (2:50) (from À chacun son histoire)
4. "Mourir demain" (3:36) (with Pascal Obispo) (from L'Instant d'après)
5. "Un ange frappe à ma porte" (4:08) (from Longueur d’ondes)
6. "Nos rendez-vous" (3:04) (from De l'amour le mieux)
7. "Tant que c'est toi" (6:24) (from L'Instant d'après)
8. "Vivre ou survivre" (version chorale) (3:09) (with the 500 Choristes) (previously unreleased)
9. "Tu m'envoles" (4:19) (from À chacun son histoire)
10. "Embrasse-moi" (single version) (3:08) (from Natasha St-Pier)
11. "Alors on se raccroche" (4:06) (from De l'amour le mieux)
12. "Ce silence" (3:51) (from Longueur d’ondes)
13. "1, 2, 3" (4:01) (from Natasha St-Pier)
14. "Tant que j'existerai" (2:58) (from Longueur d’ondes)
15. "Là-bas" (5:06) (with Florent Pagny) (from De l'amour le mieux)
16. "Haut les coeurs" (3:44) (previously unreleased)
17. "Trade It All" (4:25) (previously unreleased)
