= Natasha St-Pier =

Canadian singer (born 1981)

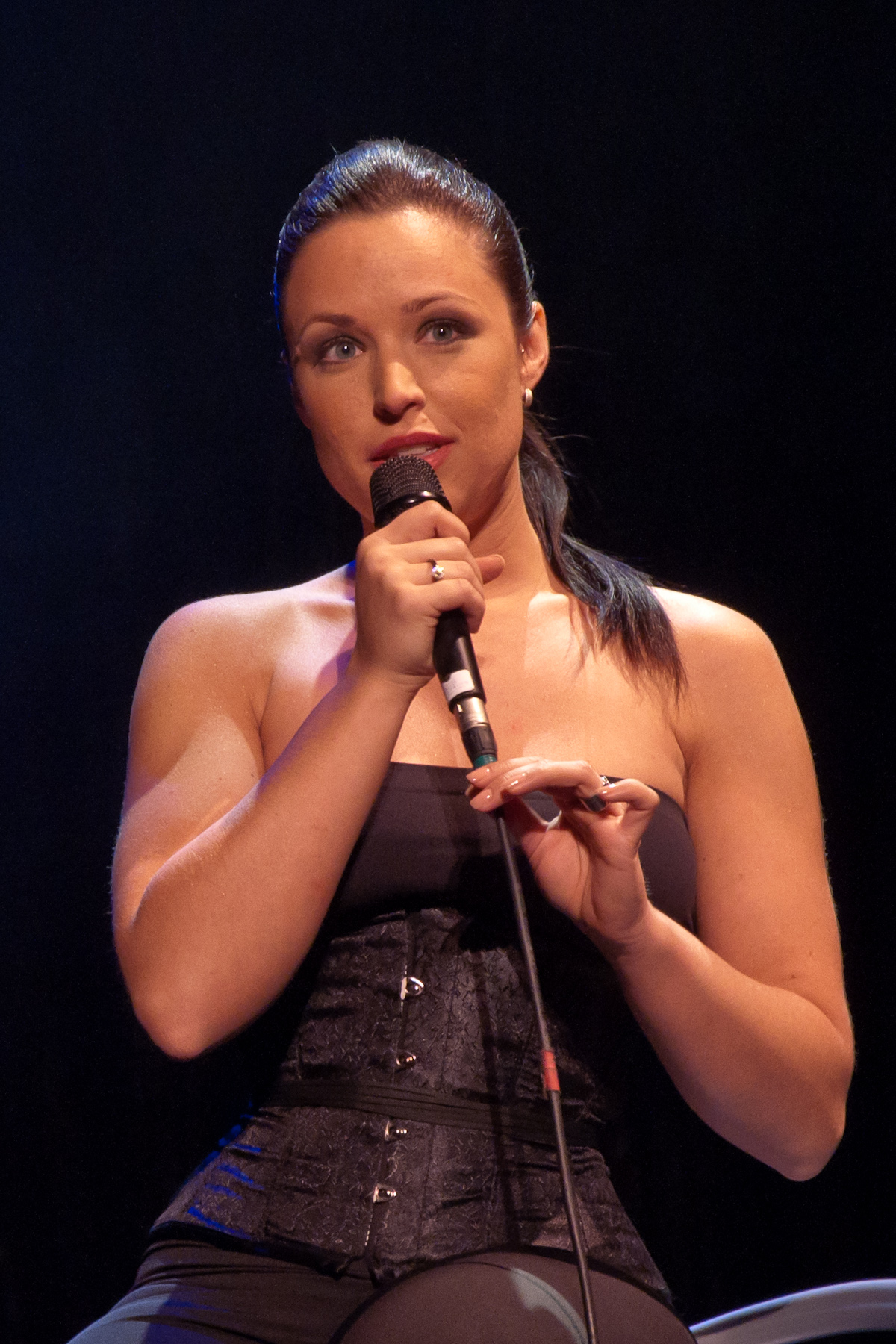
- St-Pier during her concert in Denain, on 2010 France Tour

Background information
- Born: Natasha Saint-Pierre; 10 February 1981 (age 45); Bathurst, New Brunswick, Canada
- Origin: Saint-Hilaire, New Brunswick, Canada
- Genres: French pop, Pop rock, Adult contemporary, Dance music, Contemporary Christian music, Folk music
- Occupations: Singer-songwriter, television presenter
- Years active: 1996–present
- Labels: Guy Cloutier Communications, Sony Music France
- Website: www.natashastpier.com

Natasha St-Pier (born 10 February 1981) is a Canadian singer, songwriter and television presenter. She is of Acadian heritage, and grew up in the Saint John River valley of New Brunswick, but has spent most of her career in France. St-Pier represented France in the Eurovision Song Contest 2001 with the song "Je n'ai que mon âme" (English translation: "I have only my soul"), gaining fourth place from 23 entrants.

She began her professional career at a young age in Canada, bringing out her first single at the age of 12, followed by her first album (Émergence) in 1996, at the age of 15. Her theatrical experience includes roles in the musicals Notre-Dame de Paris (in Canada and the U.K) and Don Juan (Canada, 2012).

St-Pier has had considerable commercial success in francophone countries, including France, Canada, Belgium and Switzerland. She has also become popular in a number of other countries, including Spain, Poland, Russia, Turkey and Japan. Her Eurovision song ("Je n'ai que mon âme") reached second position on the charts in France and Belgium when released as a single in 2001. In the following year, her single "Tu trouveras" ('You will find') reached position no. 3 in France and Belgium, and position no. 1 in Quebec. In 2006, her single "Un ange frappe à ma porte" ('An angel is knocking at my door') reached no. 1 in Belgium and no. 2 in France. In France, her album De l'amour le mieux (2002) was certified double platinum, while L'instant d'après (2003) and Longueur d'ondes (2006) were certified platinum and gold respectively.

In interviews, Natasha St-Pier has spoken about the importance of her Catholic faith. Following the 2013 concept album Thérèse – Vivre d'amour (for which she recorded most of the tracks), St-Pier recorded two further albums focusing on Saint Thérèse of Lisieux: Aimer c'est tout donner (2018) and Croire (2020). Her following album - Jeanne (2022) - focused on Saint Joan of Arc.

St-Pier has appeared as a guest in a number of TV series. She was coach in the second and third season of The Voice Belgique (The Voice of Belgium). In 2024, she and her dancing partner were winners in the French TV series Danse avec les stars season 13.

== Biography ==
=== Family background ===
Natasha St-Pier was born 10 February 1981 at Bathurst, New Brunswick (Canada). Together with her brother Jonathan, she grew up in Saint-Hilaire, New Brunswick, a small village in the valley of the Saint John River near Edmundston. Both of her parents are ethnically Acadian, and some of her ancestry comes from indigenous peoples of Canada. Her father, Mario Saint-Pierre, was a primary school teacher who became teacher in a prison for minors and later director of the prison. Later he worked in the Ministry of Justice and in public security. Her mother, Rose-Marie Bard was a nurse, before becoming director of a retirement home. In April 2013, Natasha St-Pier stated during a broadcast of the radio programme Faites entrer l'invité (presented by Michel Drucker) that she is a cousin four times removed of Pope Pius X.

=== Musical career ===
==== Early beginnings in Canada ====
At the age of 8 years, St-Pier took the stage for the first time, and began studying classical dance, modern jazz, piano and song. In 1992, she was spotted by Alain Morisod and invited to participate in the Sweet People Show, a program for young talents produced by a local television station in Quebec. The following year, at the age of 12, she became the youngest finalist in the singing competition Le pouvoir de la chanson. She was then invited by producers Regean and Michela Lacroix to sign her first recording contract with their Mi Re La label. In July 1995, she recorded her first single: "Le parcours du cœur", written to celebrate the fifth anniversary of the Maurice Tanguay Foundation for underprivileged children. Subsequently, she concentrated her artistic efforts on singing.

In August 1996, she released her debut studio album in Canada, entitled Émergence, which she worked on with Steve Barakatt. She promoted the album with singles: “Il ne sait pas” and "Sans le savoir". After the release of the album, she broke her contract with her agents, which she explained by divergent perceptions of further artistic development. After parting company, she interrupted her career for less than three years. Negotiations between the two sides' lawyers over the broken contract lasted more than two years. Producer Guy Cloutier then offered St-Pier a partnership, in which he invested about one million Canadian dollars in the further development of her career.

In the late 1990s, during a tour in Quebec, she was offered the opportunity to replace Julie Zenatti in the role of Fleur-de-lys for the Canadian French-language production of Notre-Dame de Paris (directed by Luc Plamondon). In the same year, she completed her baccalaureate, majoring in the sciences since she wished to become a biologist. Thanks to her performance in the Canadian production, she was cast in the London production of the musical, where she sang the same role in English, starring alongside Tina Arena. In 2000, she recorded the song “My Heart If You Will Swear”, which was included in an album of songs from the show.

==== 2000-2001: European breakthrough and the Eurovision Song Contest ====
Natasha St-Pier´s second album À chacun son histoire was initially released only in Canada (11 April 2000). The same year, she brought out three singles from the album (the title track, as well as "Et la fille danse" and "Tu m’envoles"). In the same year, she appeared as supporting act for the Québecois singer Garou at Olympia (Paris). Together with Florent Pagny, she recorded a cover version of the Jean-Jacques Goldman song "Là-bas"; the track appeared in Pagny's 2001 album 2 and later in St-Pier's own album De l'amour le mieux (2002).

St-Pier was chosen by the media network France 3 to represent France in the 2001 Eurovision Song Contest in Copenhagen, singing the power ballad "Je n'ai que mon âme". Music and lyrics for the song were written by Robert Goldman (as "Jill Kapler"), the brother of Jean-Jacques Goldman. St-Pier released the song as a single (30 April 2001) and added it to the European recording of the album À chacun son histoire (released 3 April 2001).

The single and video clip had been recorded only in French. Several days before the Eurovision Song Contest, St-Pier revealed in a media interview that she was undecided as to whether to use English or not in her performance of the song. On 12 May 2001, she performed the song under its French title, but sang the final verse in English, thus becoming the first French contestant to sing English lyrics. She received the maximum score of 12 points from three countries (Bosnia & Herzegovina, Portugal and Russia), gaining fourth place overall among the 23 participants. Her performance was the seventh time a French contestant had gained 4th place since the beginning of the competition, and was not again equalled until the second place gained by Barbara Pravi in 2021. After participating in the contest, she became the winner of several music industry awards in Canada and France, and toured internationally.

The single version of "Je n'ai que mon âme" reached no. 2 on the charts in France and Belgium, as well as fourth place in Quebec. St-Pier subsequently released an English version of the song: "All I Have Is My Soul". The album À chacun son histoire gained Gold certification in France.

==== 2002-2007: Three hit albums ====
In 2002, her collaboration with Pascal Obispo on the album De l'amour le mieux propelled Natasha St-Pier to her greatest commercial success. The album was certified as double platinum status in France, and gold in Canada, Belgium and Switzerland. Three tracks from the album were released as singles ("Tu trouveras", "Nos rendez-vous" and "Alors on se raccroche".) All three singles reached the top 100 singles, and "Tu trouveras" was certified platinum in France and Belgium and no. 1 in Quebec. The success of the album made her a sensation in Quebec, where in mid-2002 she performed her first solo concert, "Premier Rendez-vous".

On 15 February 2003 in Paris, St-Pier was given the award for Best New Artist ("Groupe ou Artiste Révélation") in the award ceremonies Victoires de la Musique, awarded by the French Ministry of Culture. Her victory, with that of Lynda Lemay as Top Female Artist of the year, received favourable remarks in the Canadian House of Commons from Mark Assad (Liberal, Gatineau) and Robert Lanctôt (Bloc Québécois, Châteauguay) two days later. In April that year, De l'amour le mieux was nominated in the Canadian Music Awards (Juno Awards of 2003) in the category "Francophone Album of the Year".

The album was released in slightly different versions in France, Canada, Japan and Spain. The Spanish version featured three tracks re-recorded in Spanish, including "Encontrarás" ("Tu trouveras"), with Miguel Bosé singing the male vocal part taken by Pascal Obispo in the French original. When released as a single on 5 October 2003, "Encontrarás" peaked at no. 2 on the Spanish charts and remained in the charts for 15 weeks. As a result, she was invited to perform at the Premios Ondas gala the following year. St-Pier was one of a few singers invited to perform with the veteran pop star Johnny Hallyday during a concert series to celebrate his 60th birthday. The two sang the duet "J'oublierai ton nom" at the Parc des Princes in Paris (10 and 11 June 2003). At the end of 2003 and the beginning of 2004, she released two double-disc compilation albums featuring her most popular songs,

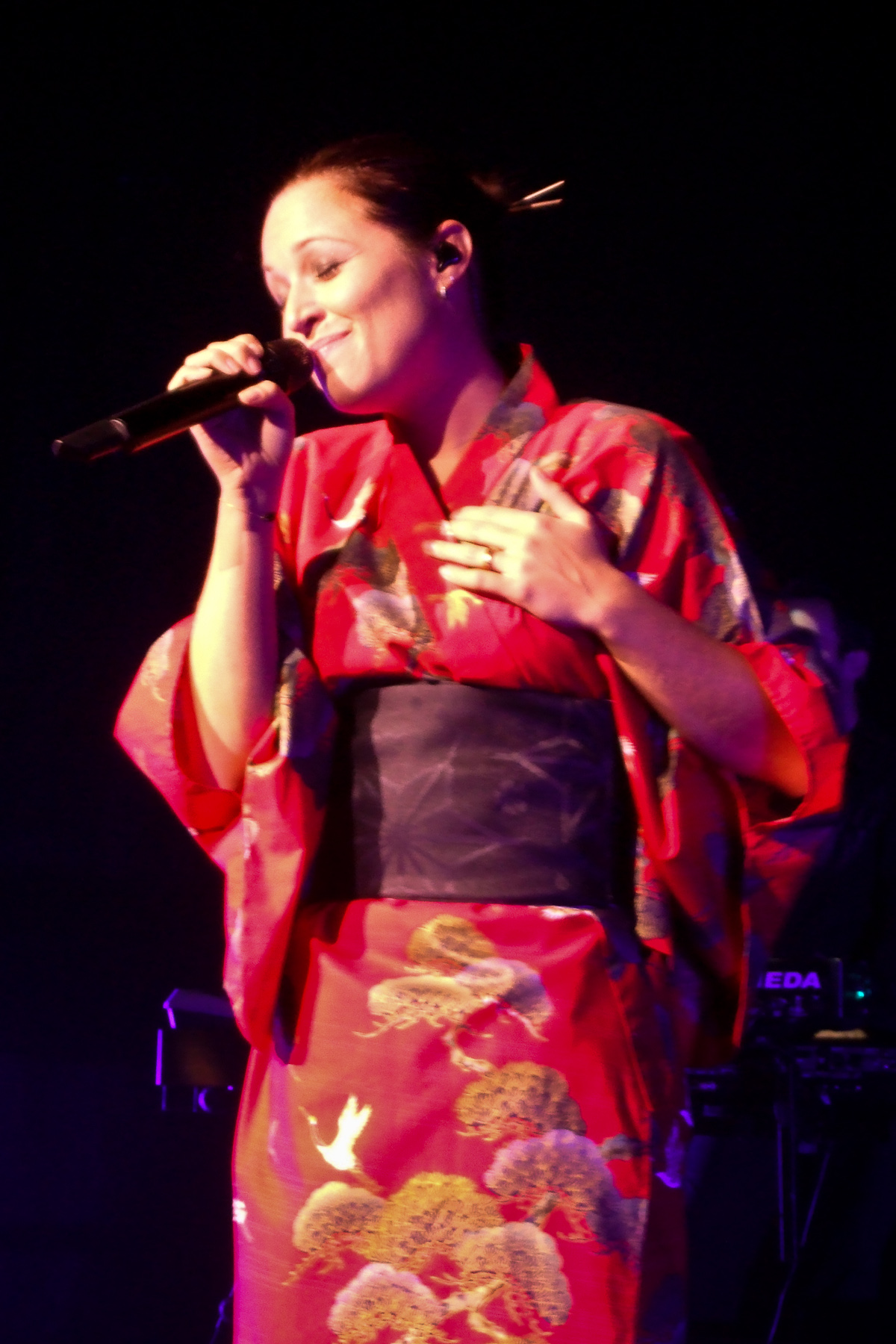
Natasha St Pier singing "Un ange frappe à ma porte" at Lyon, Longueur d'ondes tour, December 2006.

In 2004, St-Pier released the album L'Instant d'après, which reached platinum status in France. She promoted the album with the singles "Tant que c'est toi", "Quand on cherche l' amour", "Je te souhaite" and "Mourir demain" (recorded with Pascal Obispo); the latter sold 182,000 copies in France and was ranked #24 in the European charts. This was not her only collaboration with Obispo that year: the two also together recorded a cover of the Madonna song "Frozen". The duet appeared as track 15 on Obispo's 2004 album "Live Fan", the second part of the double album "Studio Fan - Live Fan". In the same year, Sony Music France released a Natasha St-Pier DVD, Un instant avec Natasha St-Pier, which included a video tour diary, a personal video dictionary, and seven music videos.

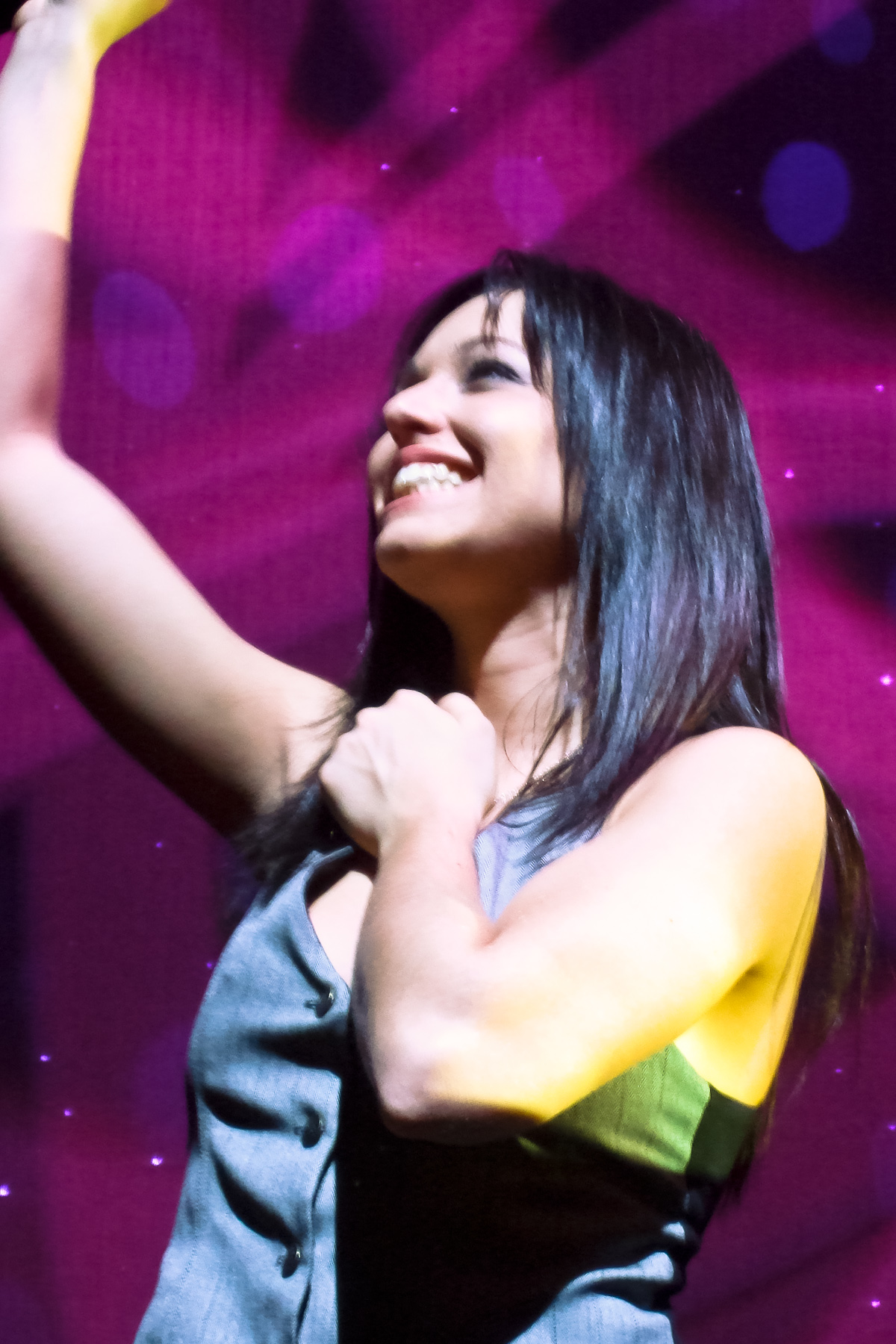
Natasha St Pier at the Olympia in 2007.

At the beginning of January 2006, St-Pier released a studio album entitled Longueur d'ondes, including the singles "Un ange frappe à ma porte", "Ce silence" and "Tant que j'existerai". The latter track was used as the theme song in French for the Canadian children's animation film "Franklin et le Trésor du lac". Longueur d'ondes debuted at the top of the list of most-sold albums in France and reached, among others, second place in the charts in Belgium. The album was certified Gold for its national sales of over 160,000 copies sold. (Note: In July 2009, SNEP (the French certifying body) changed the certification level for Platinum to 100,000 sales, which would put Longueur d'ondes at Platinum level by current standards. However, at the time the album qualified only as Gold.)

On 14 March 2006, St-Pier was a member of a jury headed by Charles Aznavour to choose the French entry for the Eurovision Song Contest 2006; other members were Lara Fabian and the Canadian singer Gage. The event, presented by Michel Drucker and Claudy Siar, was broadcast live in prime-time on France 3 under the title Eurovision 2006, et si c'était vous?. In the same year, St-Pier flew to Poland at the invitation of the weekly magazine Gala and played a mini-concert during the award ceremony for the "Róże Gali" (Polish: "Gala's Roses") statuettes. During much of 2006, St-Pier was on tour promoting Longueur d'ondes, including five days at the Olympia in Paris, one of France's largest concert venues. She extended her run at the Olympia with a further three dates in January 2007.

==== 2008-2012: Diversification ====
In November 2008, she released an album simply titled Natasha St-Pier. Earlier reports had suggested the album would be called "Embrasse-moi", from the title of the first single.

In November 2009, she released her seventh album, Tu Trouveras: 10 Ans De Succès, which is largely a "Best of" compilation of previously recorded songs, but also included the new single "L'instant T". By 2010, St-Pier had released 7 albums, topped the French album and singles charts, and made it to the top 10 of the Eurochart Hot 100. St Pier has become popular in francophone Europe, and in countries such as Poland and Russia.

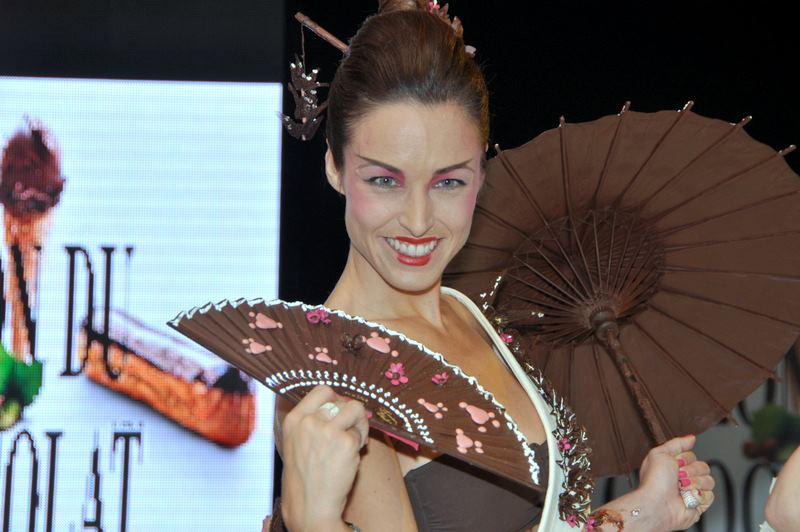
Natasha St Pier on the catwalk at the Salon du Chocolat, 2012.

During 2010 St-Pier toured Canada, Belgium and France. In that year, she was also invited to sing the song "Hero" at a French air base during a France 2 presentation by Michel Drucker to commemorate the 75th anniversary of the French air force.

In 2012, she sang the role of Elvira in the Montreal production of the musical Don Juan. Her interpretation of the role was praised by the critic Alexandre Vigneault, who described her as having "the richest voice in the cast". The same year, Natasha St-Pier opened the 20th Salon du Chocolat at Paris, wearing a dress made of chocolate in the style of a geisha (芸者).

==== 2013-2014: Thérèse – Vivre d'amour ====
In 2013, Natasha St-Pier was invited to be one of the singers on the concept album Thérèse – Vivre d'amour. Roberto Ciurleo conceived the idea of setting to music the devotional poetry of Saint Thérèse of Lisieux, and commissioned French musician Grégoire as composer. Although the album features the voices of several artists, St-Pier appears in nine of the twelve tracks. The duet "Vivre d'amour", which she recorded with Anggun, was released as a single. The album reached position two in France and four in Belgium, and was certified in France as Platinum.

In interviews, St-Pier talked about how encountering the poetry of St Thérèse had challenged her to be more aware of the spiritual dimension in daily life: "I am not a saint... (Pope) John Paul II has said that it is more difficult to do small acts in daily life than the large exceptional acts. I think that, in that, she is a model.".

In May that year, she took part in the entertainment programme Un air de star on pay TV channel M6, where she reached the semi-finals.

Also in 2013, she recorded the song "Aimer" with the male quartet Il Divo; it appeared as a track on the group's album A Musical Affair (French edition), released in November 2013. Other singers recording tracks on the album with the quartet included Hélène Ségara, Florent Pagny, Anggun, Lisa Angell, Vincent Niclo and Sonia Lacen.

On 7 December 2013, St-Pier and Anggun were invited to sing their duet "Vivre d'amour" at the 21st annual Vatican Christmas concert (Concerto di Natale XXI edizione) in Auditorium della Conciliazione, Rome. The concert was performed in the presence of Pope Francis, who told them that he greatly enjoyed the album.

On 21 September 2014, St-Pier gave two concerts accompanied by a choir of 400 at the festival "Croches en Chœur" (Quavers in concert), held at Saint-Gervais in south-western France. Both concerts were successes, prompting the festival to be continued the following year. In October that year, she also gave a concert in a theatre at Le Puy-en-Velay, presenting a mixture of her greatest hits from 2001-2006, together with songs from the album Thérèse – Vivre d'amour.

==== 2015 - 2017: Mon Acadie, "Mon pays bleu" and L'Alphabet des Animaux ====
In 2015, St-Pier recorded the song "Don't Cry for Me Argentina" from the film Evita for the album Les stars font leur cinéma (The stars make their cinema), an album of cover versions of songs which had appeared in films. On 31 March that year, she sang her 2001 Eurovision entry “Je n'ai que mon âme” in London during the Eurovision Song Contest's Greatest Hits anniversary concert. The concert was arranged by the BBC to celebrate the 60th anniversary of the Eurovision Song Contest. At the end of the concert, she joined with all the participating artists in singing the ABBA song "Waterloo".

In October 2015, she released the album Mon Acadie, a collection of covers of songs centred on her Acadian heritage. Prior to this, she had been criticised as presenting herself as Quebecois, instead of highlighting her Acadian and New Brunswick origins. Songs featured on the album included traditional Acadian folk songs ("Travailler c'est trop dur","La Bastringue"), as well as Acadian songs of the 19th and 20th centuries ("Évangéline", "Cap Enragé"). The album also included two songs credited to the Micmac ("Moweōme Aoimkoai") and Iroquois languages ("Ani Couni Chaouani" (Note: In 2017, subsequent to the album's release, a researcher from Radio Canada discovered that this song originated from Arapaho peoples of Colorado and Wyoming.)). The album featured traditional folk instruments such as the fiddle, harmonica, banjo, spoons and accordion. Several songs were recorded as duets with singers including Roch Voisine, Michel Fugain, Grégoire, Tony Carreira, Edith Kit Godin and Danny Boudreau.

In an interview after the album release, St-Pier said she had long wanted to make an album celebrating her home culture: its nature, joys and festivals. She paid tribute to Nolwenn Leroy for releasing Bretonne as a homage to her native Brittany; since the album had made it commercially viable for St-Pier's record company to consider financing an album on a small region such as Acadia.

In 2016, St-Pier recorded the song "Mon pays bleu", originally written by folk singer Roger Whittaker as "Durham Town (The Leavin')". Her cover version appeared as the title track of a tribute album to Whittaker produced by Mario Pelchat, but was also released as a single.

In 2017, she released an album aimed at young children. L'Alphabet des Animaux (The alphabet of the animals) used a playful style to help 2 - 5 year-olds to discover new words, using a wide range of musical styles.

==== 2017 - 2022: Three devotional albums ====
In June 2017, St-Pier co-hosted the second edition of the Angels Music Awards, prizes given in France for contemporary Christian music. The event was held at the venue Olympia in Paris and was sponsored by the Catholic music group Glorious. During the evening, she also sang her singles "Vivre d’Amour" and "Cap Enragé". The award ceremony was broadcast on radio stations of the network Radio chrétiennes francophone (RCF) and on television station KTO. During the evening, St-Pier whispered to the Pouzin brothers of Glorious: "J’apprécie beaucoup vos mélodies" (I really enjoy your melodies).

In January 2018, St-Pier gave a concert in the cathedral at Le Puy-en-Velay, centred on her songs based on the poetry of Saint Thérèse of Lisieux from the 2013 album Thérèse – Vivre d'amour. Although concerts at the cathedral are required to have religious content, approval was quickly given, based on St-Pier's concert in the same town in October 2014. On 9 August that year, St-Pier gave a concert ("Confidences pour un piano") at Courseulles-sur-Mer in Normandy, as part of a week-long festival of Acadian culture ("La semaine Acadienne").

Also in 2018, St-Pier released a new album (3 August) based on the poetry of Saint Thérèse, five years after Thérèse – Vivre d'amour. The new album was titled Aimer c'est tout donner, and featured music and lyrics by Thomas and Benjamin Pouzin of Glorious. Two singles were released from the album, "Aimer c'est tout donner" (To love is to give everything) and "Le cantique des cantiques" (The song of songs). The latter single alludes to the Biblical Song of Songs, and was recorded with the group Glorious, who also included the track in their 2018 album Promesse. Natasha St-Pier made a tour to promote the album in Catholic churches, commencing 28 September that year.

Cover of the 2020 Natasha St-Pier album Croire

In 2020, she released the album Croire (Believe), produced by Thomas Pouzin. She wrote three of the song texts ("Par amour" and "Peu m’importe"), which were set to music by Vincent Bidal (jazz pianist, composer and producer). In interview, she said: "This time I wanted to express what I feel without using Thérèse's words. Using my own words can help people know where I am in my spiritual journey. Especially since, for the first time, three of the album's texts are entirely my own work. I wanted to address Mary a little more, as Thérèse did, and speak directly to the public." (Note: Original quotation in Spanish: "Esta vez quería expresar lo que siento sin utilizar las palabras de Teresa. Utilizar mis propias palabras puede ayudar a la gente a saber en qué punto estoy de mi camino espiritual. Sobre todo porque, por primera vez, tres de los textos del álbum son obra mía íntegramente. Quería dirigirme un poco más a María, como hizo Teresa, y hablar directamente al público." (Translation by DeepL)) The singles released from the album were "Viens sois ma lumière" and "Sancta Maria".

In 2021, the compilation album Je n’ai que mon âme was released. It was largely a musical retrospective of her greatest successes, rearranged by Vincent Bidal, but also featured five Christmas songs sung with The Little Singers of Paris.

In perusing the writings of Thérèse of Lisieux, Natasha St-Pier discovered that the Carmelite had in turn considered Saint Joan of Arc (French: Jeanne d'Arc) her model. St-Pier determined to link the two saints in public awareness by dedicating an album to Saint Joan. Her album "Jeanne" was released in September 2022; the title track was a cover of the 2011 Laurent Voulzy single, which St-Pier also released as a single. In the promotional tour, St-Pier and her pianist presented the songs from the album in locations associated with the life of Joan of Arc.

==== 2023 - present ====
St-Pier released an album of Christmas music in November 2023, featuring covers of well-known Christmas music including Christmas carols such as "Douce Nuit (Silent Night)" and "Minuit, Chrétiens (O Holy Night)", together with popular songs such as "Feliz Navidad". She released a cover version of the gospel song "Oh Happy Day" as a single from the album.

In June 2024, St-Pier released a new "franco-espagnole" salsa version of her hit single "Tu trouveras", featuring Agustín Galiana and DJ Youcef. In the same year, she announced a new tour between November 2025 and January 2026 under the title "Mon histoire d'amour c'est vous", with concerts in France featuring her great hits and giving homage to composers and singers who have inspired her. She also continued her programme of performances in Catholic churches, based on the albums Jeanne and Thérèse.

==== Musical style ====
Beginning 2001-2004, the French media began referring to Natasha St-Pier as one of the grandes voix québécoises (big Quebecois voices) at the centre of contemporary trends in popular music. Other singers grouped in this category included Isabelle Boulay, Céline Dion, Lara Fabian, Garou, Daniel Lavoie, Lynda Lemay, Bruno Pelletier and Roch Voisine. However, the musicologist Catherine Rudent concludes that only Boulay, Dion and Fabian truly resemble St-Pier in répertoire, voice and techniques of interpretation. These singers have in common a style inherited from soul music, in which expressive vocality takes priority over the text, making full use of registers of the chest and head, vocal ornamentation and improvisation. The online music database AllMusic describes St-Pier as "A breathy-voiced chanteuse whose polished and unabashedly romantic pop songs have earned her a sizable international audience."

St-Pier has recorded duets (and trios) with Pascal Obispo, Florent Pagny, Mickaël Miro, Anggun, Élisa Tovati, Sonia Lacen, Grégory Turpin, Les Stentors, Les Petits Chanteurs à la Croix de Bois, Jean-Michel Di Falco, Roch Voisine, Tony Carreira, Michel Fugain, Grégoire, Florent Mothe, Hélène Segara, Vincent Niclo, Anne Sila and Glorious, among others. She has also appeared in the troupe of Les Enfoirés.

=== Appearances as media presenter ===
From 2011, Natasha St-Pier began making appearances as a TV presenter. On 2 March 2011, she co-hosted a primetime TV special commemorating twenty years since the death of Serge Gainsbourg. The event, broadcast simultaneously on pay TV channels AB1 and Club RTL, was called "Gainsbourg, 20 ans déjà"; her co-host was French TV presenter Jacky. Other singers performing on the evening included Julie Zenatti, Emmanuelle Seigner, Arielle Dombasle, Stanislas, Sylvie Vartan, Sanseverino and Micky Green. In 2012, she presented a tribute to Céline Dion called "We Love Céline" on NRJ 12 with Matthieu Delormeau.

Between September 2013 and June 2014, St-Pier presented the weekly television show "Les chansons d'abord" (Songs First) on France 3. On 26 January 2014, she presented on the show the three finalists to be the French entry in Eurovision Song Contest 2014. on 2 March 2014, she announced on the broadcast that Twin Twin had been chosen to represent France in the contest. During the broadcast of Eurovision 2014, she was one of the commentators for French television.

In 2013 and 2014, she was also one of the four coaches in the Belgian French-language version of the syndicated TV program The Voice (The Voice Belgique).

During the summer of 2014, she also tried radio, co-presenting the broadcast ‘’Ça ne manque pas d'airs‘’ on RTL with Jean-Michel Zecca.

On 11 May 2024, she announced the points decided by the French jury in Eurovision Song Contest 2024.

=== Personal life ===
At a private ceremony in Lit-et-Mixe on 9 March 2012, Natasha St-Pier married her boyfriend of a year and a half, Gregory Quillacq, who was a member of the aquatic and subaquatic fire brigade of Paris. St-Pier has a son named Bixente Maxime (born 13 November 2015), who underwent a successful operation to correct a congenital heart malformation. She is a dietitian, vegetarian and a Catholic. She is also a yoga teacher and an occasional scuba diver. In 2021 she announced she and her husband were in the process of divorce.

== Discography ==
=== Albums ===
Studio albums

Year	Album	Charts							Certification
Year	Album	BEL (WAL)	CAN (QC)	ESP	FRA	POL	SWI	TUR	Certification
1996	Émergence	—	—	—	—	—	—	—	
2000	À chacun son histoire	23	15	—	37	—	—	—	Gold (FRA); Gold (CAN)
2002	De l'amour le mieux	3	4	—	3	8	12	—	2 x Platinum (FRA); Gold (BEL, CAN, SWI)
2003	Encontrarás (Note: Spanish version of De l'amour le mieux.)	—	—	—	—	—	—	—	
2003	L'instant d'après	6	9	—	3	17	14	—	Platinum (FRA); Gold (BEL)
2006	Longueur d’ondes	2	13	—	1	29	11	—	Gold (FRA)
2008	Natasha St-Pier	16	71	—	16	—	63	—	
2012	Bonne nouvelle	11	35	—	11	—	80	—	
2013	Thérèse – Vivre d'amour (Note: Thérèse – Vivre d'amour is strictly speaking not an album by Natasha St-Pier, but rather a concept album featuring various artists. However, she features in nine of the twelve tracks.)	4	—	—	2	—	—	—	Platinum (FRA)
2015	Mon Acadie	18	8	—	16	—	62	—	
2017	L'alphabet des animaux	68	—	—	44	—	—	—	
2018	Aimer c'est tout donner (Note: Released in France as Thérèse de Lisieux - Aimer c'est tout donner.)	55	—	—	23	—	40	—	Gold (FRA)
2020	Croire	29	—	—	31	—	—	—	
2022	Jeanne	113	—	—	52	—	—	—	
2023	Christmas Album	20	—	—	68	—	—	—	

Rereleases / Compilations

Year	Album	Charts				Certification	Note
Year	Album	BEL (WA)	CAN (QC)	FRA	SWI	Certification	Note
2001	Je n'ai que mon âme	—	6	—	—	Gold (CAN)	Compilation – Best of
2003	À chacun son histoire / L'instant d'après	—	—	102	—	—	Double CD rerelease
2004	À chacun son histoire / De l'amour le mieux	23	—	37	—	—	Double CD rerelease
2009	Tu trouveras... 10 ans de succès	—	22	—	—	—	Compilation – Best of
2010	Natasha St-Pier / De l'amour le mieux	—	—	117	—	—	Double CD rerelease
2013	La sélection - Best Of 3CD	—	—	—	—	—	Compilation – Best of
2021	Croire + Aimer c'est tout donner - Thérèse de Lisieux	—	—	—	—	—	Double CD rerelease
2021	Je n'ai que mon âme (Note: Despite the identical name, Je n'ai que mon âme (2021) is distinct from Je n'ai que mon âme (2001). The 2001 album was released only in Quebec and the 2021 album in Europe. Although both are compilations, the track selections are quite different, since the 2021 album contains tracks recorded in the preceding two decades.)	—	—	—	—	—	Compilation – Best of

=== Singles ===
Year	Title	Chart positions							Album
Year	Title	BEL (Wa)	CAN (QC)	ESP	FRA	POL	SWI	TUR	Album
1993	"Le parcours du cœur"	—	—	—	—	—	—	—	Émergence
1996	"Il ne sait pas"	—	13	—	—	—	—	—	Émergence
1996	"Sans le savoir"	—	5	—	—	—	—	—	Émergence
1997	"Portés par la vague"	—	—	—	—	—	—	—	Émergence
2000	"À chacun son histoire"	—	4	—	—	—	—	—	À chacun son histoire
2000	"Et la fille danse"	—	7	—	—	—	—	—	À chacun son histoire
2000	"Tu m’envoles"	—	8	—	—	—	—	—	À chacun son histoire
2000	"Je t'aime encore"	—	12	—	—	—	—	—	À chacun son histoire
2001	"Je n'ai que mon âme" (Note: The single was released both in its original French version, and in an English recording ("All I have is my soul").)	2	4	—	2	—	—	—	À chacun son histoire
2002	"Qu'est-ce qui nous empêche?"	—	41	—	—	—	—	—	De l'amour le mieux
2002	"Tu trouveras" (with Pascal Obispo)	3	1	—	3	29	20	—	De l'amour le mieux
2003	"Nos rendez-vous"	15	12	—	15	5	45	—	De l'amour le mieux
2003	"Alors on se raccroche"	—	44	—	47	—	72	—	De l'amour le mieux
2003	"Toi qui manques à mon vie"	—	—	—	—	—	—	—	De l'amour le mieux
2003	"Encontrarás" (with Miguel Bosé) (Note: Spanish version of "Tu trouveras", released 2003, with Miguel Bosé singing the male part in the third verse.)	—	—	2	—	—	—	—	Encontrarás
2003	"Por probarlo todo (No se pierde nada)" (Note: Spanish version of "On peut tout essayer".)	—	—	—	—	—	—	—	Encontrarás
2003	"Tant que c'est toi"	5	37	—	11	6	31	—	L'Instant d'après
2004	"Quand on cherche l' amour"	—	5	—	—	—	—	—	L'Instant d'après
2004	"Mourir demain" (with Pascal Obispo)	4	23	—	7	—	18	—	L'Instant d'après
2004	"Je te souhaite"	—	52	—	—	—	—	—	L'Instant d'après
2005	"Ce silence" (with Frédéric Chateau)	25	52	—	28	—	—	—	Longueur d'ondes
2006	"Un ange frappe à ma porte"	1	14	—	2	—	19	—	Longueur d'ondes
2006	"Tant que j'existerai"	23	—	—	36	—	—	—	Longueur d'ondes
2007	"Laisser l'été avoir 15 ans" (with Claude Dubois)	—	4	—	—	—	—	—	—
2008	"Embrasse-moi"	28	—	—	—	—	—	12	Natasha St-Pier
2008	"1, 2, 3"	—	52	—	—	—	—	90	Natasha St-Pier
2009	"L'instant T"	—	14	—	—	—	—	73	Tu trouveras... 10 ans de succès
2011	"La route" (with Jonathan Roy)	—	6	—	—	—	—	—	Bonne nouvelle
2012	"Bonne nouvelle"	—	6	—	194	—	—	—	Bonne nouvelle
2012	"J'aime ça"	—	37	—	—	—	—	—	Bonne nouvelle
2012	"Juste comme ça" (with Mickaël Miro)	—	—	—	—	—	—	—	Bonne nouvelle
2013	"Mon tour de te bercer" (with Roch Voisine)	—	48	—	—	—	—	—	Les Duos Tandem (compilation album)
2013	"Vivre d'amour" (with Anggun)	63	—	—	86	—	—	—	Thérèse: Vivre d'amour
2015	"Cap enragé" (with Roch Voisine)	—	—	—	—	—	—	—	Mon Acadie
2015	"Tous les Acadiens"	—	—	—	—	—	—	—	Mon Acadie
2016	"Mon pays bleu"	—	—	—	—	—	—	—	Mon pays bleu (tribute album)
2018	"Le cantique des cantiques" (with Glorious)	—	—	—	—	—	—	—	Aimer c'est tout donner
2018	"Aimer c'est tout donner"	—	—	—	—	—	—	—	Aimer c'est tout donner
2020	"Viens sois ma lumière"	—	—	—	—	—	—	—	Croire
2020	"Sancta Maria"	—	—	—	—	—	—	—	Croire
2022	"Jeanne"	—	—	—	—	—	—	—	Jeanne
2023	"Oh happy day"	—	—	—	—	—	—	—	Christmas Album
2024	Tu trouveras (salsa version)	—	—	—	—	—	—	—	Non-album single

=== Featured in ===
Year	Title	Chart positions				Album
Year	Title	BEL (Wa)	FRA	SWI	QUE	Album
2007	"Pour que tu sois libre (La rose Marie Claire)" (Leslie / Anggun / Jennifer McCray / Natasha St Pier / Elisa Tovati / Julie Zenatti)	—	21	—	—	
2013	"Donne-moi le temps" (Segara / St Pier / Keim / Alizée / L'Orchestre Ostinato)	45	99	—	—	
2014	"Laissez-nous chanter" (live) (Goldman / Fiori / Clerc / Youn / Lorie / Laroque / Foly / Tal / Ségara / St-Pier / Nolwenn Leroy / Zazie)	—	196	—	—	

== See also ==
- French pop music
- List of Catholic musicians

Preceded by Sofia Mestari with "On aura le ciel"	France in the Eurovision Song Contest; 2001	Succeeded by Sandrine François with "Il faut du temps"
