= Jeanne (album) =

Studio album by Natasha St-Pier
- Released: 30 September 2022 (France)
- Genres: French pop, Contemporary Christian music
- Label: Parlophone

Natasha St-Pier chronology
Je n'ai que mon âme (2021)	Jeanne (2022)	Christmas Album (2023)

Jeanne is the thirteenth studio album recorded by Canadian singer Natasha St-Pier. The album is a concept album based around the life of the mediaeval French saint Joan of Arc (French: Jeanne d'Arc). The album was released in 2022 in France as both a CD and a vinyl LP.

== Conception and release ==
Natasha St-Pier released Jeanne following three albums focused on Saint Thérèse of Lisieux: Thérèse – Vivre d'amour (2013), Aimer c'est tout donner (2018) and Croire (2020). In perusing Saint Thérèse's writings, Natasha St-Pier discovered that the Carmelite had in turn considered Saint Joan of Arc her model. St-Pier determined to link the two saints in public awareness by dedicating an album to Saint Joan.

Her album Jeanne was released in September 2022. The title track was a cover of the 2011 Laurent Voulzy single, which St-Pier also released as a single. In the promotional tour, St-Pier and her pianist presented the songs from the album in churches and other locations associated with the life of Joan of Arc.

== Charts ==
Chart (2022)	Peak position
Belgian (Wallonia) Albums Chart	113
French Albums Chart	52
