= De l'amour le mieux =

Studio album by Natasha St-Pier
- Released: 19 March 2002 (Canada)
- Recorded: 2001; Hauts De Gammes Studio, Boulogne-Billancourt; Hit House, Montréal; Studio Méga, Suresnes; Studio Miraval, Correns
- Genre: Pop
- Length: 56:36
- Label: Sony Music France/Columbia; Guy Cloutier Communications
- Producer: Pascal Obispo; Robert Goldman ("J. Kapler"); Rick Allison

Natasha St-Pier chronology
Je n'ai que mon âme (2001)	De l'amour le mieux (2002)	L'Instant d'après (2003)

Encontrarás
- Spanish version of "De l'amour le mieux"

Singles from De l'amour le mieux
- 1. "Tu trouveras" Released: 2002; 2. "Nos rendez-vous" Released: 2002; 3. "Alors on se raccroche" Released: 2003

De l'amour le mieux is the third studio album by Natasha St-Pier, released in 2002. It achieved great success in Canada (Quebec), France, Belgium (Wallonia) and Switzerland. The album was first released in 2002 in Francophone countries in two versions, one for Canada and the other for Francophone countries in Europe. In 2003, two new versions appeared, one for Spain (including three songs translated into Spanish) and the other for Japan.

== Track listings ==
=== Canadian version ===
1. "Tu trouveras" (single)
2. "Nos rendez-vous" (single)
3. "Grandir c'est dire je t'aime"
4. "Tous les au-revoir se ressemblent"
5. "Alors on se raccroche" (single)
6. "Les chansons ne servent à rien"
7. "De l'amour le mieux"
8. "Pourquot tant de larmes"
9. "Enlève ton blouson" (Bonus Canada)
10. "Toi qui manque à ma vie"
11. "On peut tout essayer"
12. "Les diamants sont solitaires"
13. "Qu'est-ce qui nous empêche"
14. "L'amour emporte tout"
15. "Là-bas" (feat. Florent Pagny)

=== French version ===
1. "Tu trouveras" (single) (Lionel Florence, Pascal Obispo) — 4:58
2. "Nos rendez-vous" (single) (Patrice Guirao, Giacchino Maurici, Volodia) — 3:04
3. "Grandir c'est dire je t'aime" (David Gategno, Marie-Jo Zarb) — 3:32
4. "Tous les au-revoir se ressemblent" (Florence, Gategno, Maurici) — 3:43
5. "Alors on se raccroche" (single) (Florence, Maurici, Obispo) — 4:06
6. "Les chansons ne servent à rien" (Florence, Gategno) — 3:30
7. "De l'amour le mieux" (Florence, Obispo) — 4:13
8. "Pourquoi tant de larmes" (Kapler, Fred Kocourek) — 3:58
9. "Toi qui manque à ma vie" (Calogero Bros, Julie D'aimé) — 3:20
10. "On peut tout essayer" (Frédéric Doll, Volodia) — 3:52
11. "Les diamants sont solitaires" (Calogero, Florence, Obispo, Zarb) — 4:27
12. "Qu'est-ce qui nous empêche" (David Manet, Christian Vie) — 4:03
13. "L'amour emporte tout" (Didier Golemanas, Daniel Seff) — 4:13
14. "Là-bas" (feat. Florent Pagny) (Jean-Jacques Goldman) — 5:08

=== Spanish version ===
1. "Encontrarás" (feat. Miguel Bosé, Spanish version of "Tu trouveras") Single #2 Spain
2. "Cita sin amor" (Spanish version of "Nos rendez-vous")
3. "Por probarlo todo no se pierde nada" (Spanish version of "On peut tout essayer") (single)
4. "Tous les au-revoir se ressemblent"
5. "Grandir c'est dire je t'aime"
6. "Alors on se raccroche"
7. "Les chansons ne servent à rien"
8. "De l'amour le mieux"
9. "Tu trouveras"
10. "Qu'est-ce qui nous empêche"
11. "L'amour emporte tout"
12. "Là-bas"
13. "Toi qui manque à ma vie"
14. "Nos rendez-vous"

=== Japanese version ===
1. "Tu trouveras"
2. "Nos rendez-vous"
3. "Grandir c’est dire je t’aime"
4. "Tous les au-revoir se ressemblent"
5. "Alors on se raccroche"
6. "Les chansons ne servent à rien"
7. "De l’amour le mieux"
8. "Pourquoi tant de larmes"
9. "Toi qui manque à ma vie"
10. "On peut tout essayer"
11. "Les diamants sont solitaires"
12. "Qu’est-ce qui nous empêche"
13. "L'amour emporte tout"
14. "Là-bas" (feat. Florent Pagny)
15. "All I Have Is My Soul" (Bonus Japan)

== Personnel ==
- Rick Allison – Piano, Arranger, Programming, Realization
- Denis Benarrosch – Percussion
- Laurent Coppola – Drums
- Denis Courchesne – Drums
- Patrice Cramer – Mixing
- Jean Yves d'Angelo – Piano, Fender Rhodes
- Chistopher Deschamps – Drums
- Claude Engel – Guitar (Acoustic)
- Steve Forward – Mixing
- Bruce Gaitsch – Guitar, Engineer
- David Gategno – Guitar (Acoustic), Assistant Publisher
- Rob Heaney – Engineer
- Raphael Jonin – Mastering
- Julie Leblanc – Choeurs
- Basil Leroux – Guitar (Electric)
- Stephane Levy B – Engineer
- Rémy Malo – Basse
- Pascal Obispo – Guitar (Acoustic), Choeurs, Realization
- Christian St-Germain – Programming, Engineer, Pro-Tools
- Natasha St. Pier – Choeurs
- Sébastien Surel – Arranger
- Cyril Tarquiny – Guitar (Acoustic), Guitar (Electric)
- Volodia – Engineer, Mixing, Realization
- Volt – Photography

== Charts ==
=== Weekly charts ===
Chart (2002–2003)	Peak position
Belgian (Wallonia) Albums Chart	3
Canada (ADISQ Quebec)	4
French Albums Chart	3
Polish Albums Chart	8
Swiss Albums Chart	12

=== Year-end charts ===
Chart (2002)	Position
Belgian (Wallonia) Albums Chart	15
Canadian Albums Chart	117
Europe (European Top 100 Albums)	88
French Albums Chart	14
Chart (2003)	Position
Belgian (Wallonia) Albums Chart	40
Chart (2004)	Position
French Albums Chart	140

== Certifications ==
Region	Certification	Certified units/sales
Belgium (BRMA)	Gold	25,000^{*}
Canada (Music Canada)	Gold	50,000^{^}
France (SNEP)	2× Platinum	600,000^{*}
Switzerland (IFPI Switzerland)	Gold	20,000^{^}
^{*} Sales figures based on certification alone.^{^} Shipments figures based on certification alone.
