= Émergence (Natasha St-Pier album) =

Emergence

Studio album by Natasha St-Pier
- Released: 1996 (Canada)
- Genre: Pop
- Length: 47:15
- Label: Guy Cloutier Communications
- Producer: Steve Barakatt

Natasha St-Pier chronology
Emergence (1996)	À chacun son histoire (2000)

Emergence is the first studio album by Natasha St-Pier, released 22 August 1996 in Canada.

== Track listing ==
1. Sans le savoir (single)
2. Il ne sait pas (single)
3. Les Magiciens
4. Pourquoi tu m'aimes
5. J'aim cru trouver l'amour
6. Mou'tian (Sung in Cantonese, Originally sung by Hong Kong singer-actress Kelly Chen)
7. "Le Parcours du cœur"
8. Portés par la vague (single)
9. Friends (Sung in English)
10. Le Monde à refaire
11. Repose ton âme
