= Je n'ai que mon âme (2001 album) =

Compilation album by Natasha St-Pier
- Released: 26 June 2001 (Canada)
- Genre: Pop
- Length: 42:58
- Label: Distribution Select / Guy Cloutier Communications

Natasha St-Pier chronology
| À chacun son histoire (2000) | Je n'ai que mon âme (2001) | De l'amour le mieux (2002) |

Je n'ai que mon âme is a compilation album released only in Quebec by Canadian singer Natasha St-Pier. The album was released due to the success of the song "Je n'ai que mon âme". Although the song was included in the European release of the album A chacun son histoire (2001), it was recorded after the Canadian album release (2000). An English version of "Je n'ai que mon âme" was also included (it is called "All I Have Is My Soul"). The album contains one unreleased song, "I'm in Love", which is an English version of "Tu m'envoles" and has never been released in France. The album was released on 26 June 2001. No singles were released from this album.

== Track listing ==
1. Je n'ai que mon âme (2:51)
2. Sans le savoir (4:40)
3. Il ne sait pas (4:07)
4. J'ai cru trouver l'amour (3:10)
5. Repose ton âme (4:54)
6. My Heart If You Will Swear (2:25)
7. Je t'aime encore (dance version) (3:51)
8. I'm in love (4:18)
9. Le vent (4:22)
10. Près d'une autre (5:29)
11. All I Have Is My Soul (2:51)

== Certifications ==
| Country | Certification | Date | Sales certified |
|---|---|---|---|
| Canada | Gold | 26 November 2001 | 50,000 |

== Charts ==
| Chart (2001) | Peak position |
|---|---|
| Canadian (Quebec) chart: ADISQ | 6 |
