= Thérèse – Vivre d'amour =

Studio album by Various Artists
- Released: 22 April 2013
- Recorded: 2013
- Genre: Pop
- Label: Twin Music

Natasha St-Pier chronology
Bonne Nouvelle (2012)	Thérèse – Vivre d'amour (2013)	Mon Acadie (2015)

Thérèse – Vivre d'amour is a concept album of poems by Saint Thérèse of Lisieux set to music. Roberto Ciurleo conceived the idea of setting to music the devotional poetry of St Thérèse, and invited French musician Grégoire to compose the music. The album features performances by Natasha St-Pier, Anggun, Sonia Lacen, Elisa Tovati, Les Stentors, Les Petits Chanteurs à la Croix de Bois, and Michael Lonsdale. It was released on 22 April 2013 by Twin Music in France, Belgium, and Switzerland. "Vivre d'amour", a duet by Natasha St-Pier and Anggun, was released as the album's first single on 29 March 2013. In 2014, Thérèse - Vivre d'amour was nominated for a World Music Awards for World's Best Album.

== Track listing ==
No.	Title	Performer(s)	Length
1.	"Vivre d'amour Video on YouTube"	Natasha St-Pier and Anggun	3:23
2.	"Jeter des fleurs"	Natasha St-Pier	3:04
3.	"Rappelle-toi"	Natasha St-Pier, Elisa Tovati and Sonia Lacen	4:09
4.	"Petit papa"	Natasha St-Pier	2:59
5.	"La fiancée"	Natasha St-Pier and Anggun	3:14
6.	"Mes armes Video on YouTube"	Natasha St-Pier and Sonia Lacen	2:31
7.	"Pourquoi je t'aime Marie"	Natasha St-Pier	3:03
8.	"Ma seule paix"	Natasha St-Pier and Grégory Turpin	2:26
9.	"Ma joie"	Natasha St-Pier and Les Stentors	3:04
10.	"À mes petits frères du ciel"	Grégory Turpin and Les Petits Chanteurs à la Croix de Bois	2:57
11.	"Mon chant d'aujourd'hui"	Michael Lonsdale	2:36
12.	"La prière"	Monseigneur Jean-Michel di Falco Léandri	2:12

== Charts and certifications ==
=== Charts ===
Chart (2013)	Peak position
Belgian Wallonia Albums Chart	4
French Albums Chart	2
French Physical Albums Chart	1

=== Certifications ===
Country (Provider)	Certifications
France (SNEP)	Platinum
