= À chacun son histoire =

Studio album by Natasha St-Pier
- Released: 11 April 2000 (Canada); 3 April 2001 (France)
- Genre: Pop
- Length: 52:28
- Label: Sony Music France/Columbia; Guy Cloutier Communications

Natasha St-Pier chronology
| Emergence (1996) | À chacun son histoire (2000) | Je n'ai que mon âme (2001) |

À chacun son histoire (English translation: "Everyone has his/her story") is the second studio album and the first internationally released album by Natasha St-Pier. The album was released 11 April 2000 in Canada, and subsequently in 2001 in France and Belgium. The 2001 European release differs from the 2000 Canadian release especially by the addition of the song "Je n'ai que mon âme", with which St-Pier represented France in the 2001 Eurovision Song Contest.

== Track listing ==
French version

| No. | Title | Lyrics | Music | Length |
|---|---|---|---|---|
| 1. | "Je n'ai que mon âme (French version)" (single) | Robert Goldman (as "J. Kapler") | Goldman ("J. Kapler") | 2:52 |
| 2. | "À chacun son histoire" (single) | Giuseppe Andreetto, Stéphane Marchand | Piero Cassano | 4:49 |
| 3. | "Laisse-moi tout rêver" | Paolo Marino, Jean-Marie Moreau | Charly Cartisano, Cassano | 4:51 |
| 4. | "Près d'une autre" | David Manet | Cassano | 5:32 |
| 5. | "Tu m'envoles" (single) | Claudia Ferrandi, Moreau | Cassano | 4:21 |
| 6. | "Toi et moi" | Moreau | Cassano, Fabio Perversi | 4:44 |
| 7. | "Dans mes nuits" | Luc Plamondon | Cassano | 4:18 |
| 8. | "Le Vent" | Marino, Natasha St-Pier | Cartisano, Cassano | 4:23 |
| 9. | "Tu n'es plus dans ma tête" | St-Pier | Cassano | 3:50 |
| 10. | "Je t'aime encore" | Daniel Lavoie | Cassano | 3:52 |
| 11. | "Et la fille danse" | Ève Déziel | Cassano | 3:58 |
| 12. | "Si jamais..." | Manuel Tadros | Cassano, Perversi | 4:50 |

Canadian version

| No. | Title | Lyrics | Music | Length |
|---|---|---|---|---|
| 1. | "À chacun son histoire" (single (Note: Originally written in Italian as Ancora gli occhi tuoi, and translated into French by Stéphane Marchand. The Spanish singer Sergio Dalma sang the Spanish version "Cara a cara" on the album Historias normales, which appeared in October 1998.)) | Giuseppe Andreetto | Piero Cassano | 4:47 |
| 2. | "Et la fille danse" | Ève Déziel | Piero Cassano | 3:57 |
| 3. | "Près d'une autre" | David Manet | Piero Cassano | 5:29 |
| 4. | "Tu m'envoles" (single (Note: Originally written in Italian as Ti amerò, translated into French by Jean-Marie Moreau.)) | Claudia Ferrandi | Piero Cassano | 4:18 |
| 5. | "Toi et moi" | Jean-Marie Moreau | Piero Cassano, Fabio Perversi | 4:43 |
| 6. | "Dans mes nuits" | Luc Plamondon | Piero Cassano | 4:16 |
| 7. | "Le Vent (Note: Originally written in Italian as Il vento non c'è, translated into French by St-Pier. Previously recorded by Paolo Marino (1992) on his album Senza Frontiera.)" | Paolo Marino | Piero Cassano, Charly Cartisano | 4:22 |
| 8. | "Tu n'es plus dans ma tête" | Natasha St-Pier | Piero Cassano | 3:49 |
| 9. | "Je t'aime encore" | Daniel Lavoie | Piero Cassano | 3:51 |
| 10. | "Laisse-moi tout rêver (Note: Originally written in Italian as Quanto male c'è, translated into French by Jean-Marie Moreau. Previously recorded by Paolo Marino (1992) on his album Senza Frontiera.)" | Paolo Marino | Piero Cassano, Charly Cartisano | 4:47 |
| 11. | "Si jamais" | Manuel Tadros | Piero Cassano, Fabio Perversi | 4:50 |

== Charts ==
=== Weekly charts ===
| Chart (2001) | Peak position |
|---|---|
| Belgium (Wallonia) | 23 |
| Canada (ADISQ Quebec) | 15 |
| France (lescharts.com) | 37 |

=== Year-end charts ===
| Chart (2001) | Position |
|---|---|
| French Albums Chart | 150 |

== Certifications ==
| Region | Certification | Certified units/sales |
|---|---|---|
| France (SNEP) | Gold | 100,000^{*} |
^{*} Sales figures based on certification alone.
