= Bonne nouvelle =

Bonne nouvelle (French "good news") or Bonne Nouvelle may refer to:

== Geography ==
=== Paris ===
- Bonne-Nouvelle (fr:Quartier de Bonne-Nouvelle), in the 2nd arrondissement of Paris
- Notre-Dame de Bonne-Nouvelle, Paris
- Bonne Nouvelle station, a Paris Metro station

== Broadcasting and companies ==
- Radio Bonne Nouvelle WYGG Haitian radio station in New Jersey
- Radio Bonne Nouvelle, Gabon List of television networks by country
- Bonne Nouvelle, South Africa Michel Rolland

== Music ==
- Bonne nouvelle (Natasha St-Pier album)

=== Songs ===
- "Bonne nouvelle", song on the album Beaux Dégâts Francis Cabrel
- "Bonne Nouvelle" by Natasha St-Pier Bonne nouvelle (Natasha St-Pier album) composed by Simeo
- "Bonne Nouvelle" by Jean Yves d'Angelo
- "Bonne Nouvelle" by Birdy Nam Nam
- "Bonne Nouvelle" by Orchestra Baobab Benoit Tranle / Manuel Merlot / Ouafi Djakliou / William Jarry
- "Bonne Nouvelle" by Verdena
