= Aimer c'est tout donner =

Aimer C'est Tout Donner

Studio album by Natasha St-Pier
- Released: 2018 (Canada); 30 November 2018 (France)
- Studio: Studio Lyon Centre (France); Studios St Germain (France); Music Design Project Studios (France); Warner Chappell Studios, Paris
- Genre: French pop, Classical music, Contemporary Christian music
- Label: MP3 Disques; MCA Records; Universal Music France
- Producer: Glorious

Natasha St-Pier chronology
L'alphabet des animaux (2017)	Aimer C'est Tout Donner (2018)	Croire (2020)

Aimer c'est tout donner (English translation: "To love is to give everything") is the eleventh studio album recorded by Canadian singer Natasha St-Pier. It was also her second album based on the poetry of Saint Thérèse of Lisieux, after Thérèse – Vivre d'amour (2013). The album was released in 2018 in both Canada and France as a double CD set. In France, the album carried the title Thérèse de Lisieux - Aimer C'est Tout Donner.

The album achieved considerable success, charting in Belgium, France and Switzerland. In France, the album was certified Gold for its sales 2018-2021.

== Conception, production and release ==
Natasha St-Pier released the album 3 August 2018. It was conceived as a follow-up to the 2013 concept album Thérèse – Vivre d'amour, in which she had been deeply involved. Both albums were based on the poetry of Saint Thérèse of Lisieux. The new album featured music and lyrics by Thomas and Benjamin Pouzin of the Catholic music group Glorious. Two singles were released from the album, "Aimer c'est tout donner" (To love is to give everything) and "Le cantique des cantiques" (The song of songs). The latter single alludes to the Biblical Song of Songs, and was recorded with the group Glorious, who also included the track in their 2018 album Promesse. Natasha St-Pier made a tour to promote the album in Catholic churches, commencing 28 September that year.

== Chart performance ==
In France, the album entered the charts 11 August 2018 in position 23 (its highest position), and remained in the charts for a total of 41 weeks, finally exiting them 7 March 2020.

In Belgium, the album entered the charts on the same date in position 55 (its highest position and remained in the charts for 20 weeks. In Switzerland, the album entered the charts 12 August 2018 and remained in the charts for 3 weeks.

== Certifications ==
Gold certification in France.

== Charts ==
Chart (2018–2020)	Peak position
Belgian (Wallonia) Albums Chart	55
French Albums Chart	23
Swiss Albums Chart	40
