= Tu trouveras =

Single by Natasha St-Pier

from the album De l'amour le mieux
- Released: 2002
- Recorded: 2002, Canada
- Genre: Pop
- Length: 3:26
- Label: Sony Music France/Columbia; Guy Cloutier Communications
- Songwriters: Pascal Obispo, Lionel Florence
- Producers: Pascal Obispo, Volodia

Natasha St-Pier singles chronology
"Tu m'envoles" (2001)	"Tu trouveras" (2002)	"Nos rendez-vous" (2002)

Music video
- "Tu trouveras" on YouTube

"Tu trouveras" (English translation: "You Will Find") is the name of a 2002 song recorded by Canadian singer Natasha St-Pier and French singer Pascal Obispo. It was composed by Obispo and written by Lionel Florence.

It was released as the first single from Natasha St-Pier's third album, De l'amour le mieux, on which it features as first track. The song reached number one position on the charts in Quebec and became a top three hit in France and Belgium (Wallonia). It was frequently aired on radio, remaining to date St-Pier's most successful single in terms of sales.

== Song information ==
The music was written by famous composer Lionel Florence, and composed by Pascal Obispo, who also participated in the production of the song. The song is a ballad, in which the female singer expresses to her lover her weaknesses and insecurities. The two verses are each followed by a refrain, beginning with the words "Tu trouveras..." The second refrain is immediately followed by two further refrains, in which the male lover (sung by Obispo) echoes the female singer, implying that he too is fallible and insecure. Since the song is sung by both St-Pier and Obispo, the song is generally considered as a duet, even though Natasha St-Pier sings most of the lyrics. They have performed the song together in many French TV programs.

The song features on many French compilations, such as Les Plus Belles Ballades, Les Plus Beaux Duos, Non Stop Hits 4, Les Plus Belles Voix, vol. 1, Hitbox 2002 Best of, vol. 4 and Hit de diamant.

Christophe Maé covered the song included in a medley named "Mister Restos 2008" on Les Enfoirés' 2008 album Le Secret des Enfoirés.

== Chart performance ==
In France, "Tu trouveras" started at number four on 30 March 2002 and peaked at number three in its third week, behind Shakira's "Whenever, Wherever" and Jean-Pascal Lacoste's "L'Agitateur". It remained for 18 consecutive weeks in the top ten and 25 weeks in the top 50. It was awarded Platinum disc by the SNEP, and ranked sixth on the year-end chart. As of August 2014, it was the 42nd best-selling single of the 21st century in France, with 441,000 units sold. "Tu trouveras" was the most aired song of 2002 in France, with 14,957 broadcastings and 1.2 billion contacts. According to airplay charts provider Yacast, the song was the most aired on five radio stations: Alouette, Champagne MF, Hit West, Kiss FM and Scoop.

In Belgium (Wallonia), "Tu trouveras" entered the chart at number 14 on 30 March, peaked at number three for four consecutive weeks, remained for 12 weeks in the top five, 20 weeks in the top 20 and 31 weeks on the chart. It was the seventh best-selling single of the year and achieved Platinum status. In Switzerland, it peaked at number 20 in the third week, on 5 May 2002, out of a nine-week chart run in the top 100. On the pan-European Hot 100 Singles established by Music & Media magazine, it debuted at number ten and peaked at number seven in its third week.

In 2003, St-Pier recorded a version in Spanish, "Encontrarás" with the Spanish singer Miguel Bosé, which reached number two on the Spanish Singles Chart.

== Track listing ==
- CD single
1. "Tu trouveras" — 3:26
2. "Les Diamants sont solitaires" — 4:27

== Charts ==
=== Weekly charts ===
Weekly chart performance for "Tu trouveras"
Chart (2002–2003)	Peak position
Belgium (Ultratop 50 Wallonia)	3
Canada (ADISQ Quebec)	1
Europe (Eurochart Hot 100)	7
France (SNEP)	3
France (TV Music Videos Chart)	20
Poland (Airplay Chart)	29
Spain (PROMUSICAE)	2
Switzerland (Schweizer Hitparade)	20

=== Year-end charts ===
Year-end chart performance for "Tu trouveras"
Chart (2002)	Position
Belgium (Wallonia Ultratop 40)	7
Europe (Eurochart Hot 100)	41
France (Airplay Chart)	1
France (SNEP)	6
France (TV Music Videos Chart)	20

== Certifications ==
Region	Certification	Certified units/sales
Belgium (BRMA)	Platinum	50,000^{*}
France (SNEP)	Platinum	500,000^{*}
^{*} Sales figures based on certification alone.
