= Jeanne (Laurent Voulzy song) =

2011 single by Laurent Voulzy

Single by Laurent Voulzy

from the album Lys & Love
- Released: 13 September 2011
- Genre: Pop
- Label: Columbia
- Songwriters: Laurent Voulzy, Alain Souchon
- Producers: Laurent Voulzy, Benjamin Patou

Laurent Voulzy singles chronology
| "Dans le vent qui va" (2009) | "Jeanne" (2011) | "C'était déjà toi" (2012) |

Music video
- "Jeanne" on YouTube

"Jeanne" is a song by Laurent Voulzy. It was the first single released from his album Lys & Love (2011). The single was released 13 September 2011. The lyrics were written by Alain Souchon, while Laurent Voulzy composed the music. The song was dedicated to Joan of Arc (French: Jeanne d'Arc).

The song became a great success for Laurent Voulzy, which he performed during his promotional tour Lys & Love Tour in 2013.

== History of composition ==
In an interview, Laurent Voulzy stated he decided to compose the song after Joan of Arc appeared to him in a dream. He also explained his passion in childhood for history and the Middle Ages in particular.

It also appears on his love album Le Concert, recorded with his friend Alain Souchon.

== Cover versions ==
The song was covered by Natasha St-Pier, appearing as the first single from her eponymous album Jeanne (2022).

== Chart performance ==
| Chart (2011) | Peak position |
|---|---|
| Belgium (Ultratop 50 Wallonia) | 4 |
| France (SNEP) | 14 |
