= Bonne nouvelle (Natasha St-Pier album) =

Studio album by Natasha St-Pier
- Released: 11 June 2012 (France)
- Genre: Pop
- Length: 42:34
- Label: Columbia, Sony Music
- Producer: Siméo

Natasha St-Pier chronology
Tu trouveras... 10 ans de succès (Best of) (2009)	Bonne nouvelle (2012)	Thérèse – Vivre d'amour (2013)

Singles from Bonne nouvelle
- 1. "Bonne nouvelle" Released: 30 January 2012; 2. "Juste comme ça" Released: 16 July 2012

Bonne nouvelle is the seventh studio album by Canadian singer Natasha St-Pier. It was released in 2012. The limited release, only on Vente-privee website, was on 11 June 2012 and wider release of the album is on 9 July 2012, including digital and physical album. The first single, "Bonne nouvelle", was released from the album on 30 January 2012.

The album has thus far been significantly less successful than her previous works.

== Track listing ==
All songs written by Siméo except where noted.

No.	Title	Writer(s)	Length
1.	"Bonne nouvelle"		3:17
2.	"Ma meilleure idée"		3:44
3.	"Par cœur"		3:07
4.	"Même pas peur"		3:37
5.	"La Princesse"		2:55
6.	"J'aime ça"		3:23
7.	"Elle veut bien croire"		4:22
8.	"Une petite fille"		3:35
9.	"Vous les hommes"		4:40
10.	"Pour ne jamais t'oublier"	Siméo, Natasha St-Pier	3:16
11.	"Juste comme ça" (duet with Mickaël Miro)	Mickaël Miro	3:08
12.	"Dans le mercure"		3:33

Canadian bonus track

No.	Title	Length
13.	"La Route" (duet with Jonathan Roy)
