= L'Instant d'après =

L'instant d'après

Studio album by Natasha St-Pier
- Released: 4 November 2003 (Canada); 3 November 2003 (France)
- Genre: Pop
- Length: 54:32
- Label: Sony Music France/Columbia; Guy Cloutier Communications

Natasha St-Pier chronology
De l'amour le mieux (2002)	L'instant d'après (2003)	Longueur d’ondes (2006)

L'Instant d'après is the fourth studio album recorded by Canadian singer Natasha St-Pier. It was released in 2003 and met success in many countries, including France where it reached No. 3 in the country's chart. It was also received with critical acclaim.

== Track listing ==
1. "Tant que c'est toi" (single) — 6:24
2. "Quand on cherche l'amour" (single) — 3:36
3. "Mourir demain" (duet with Pascal Obispo, single) — 3:37
4. "Plus simple que ça" — 3:33
5. "J'avais quelqu'un" (single) — 3:23
6. "Je te souhaite" (single) — 3:48
7. "Chacun pour soi" — 4:02
8. "Pour le meilleur" — 3:06
9. "Croire" — 3:29
10. "J'oublie toujours quelque chose" — 3:27
11. "Qu'y a-t-il entre nous?" — 3:43
12. "Juste un besoin de chaleur" — 3:29
13. "Quand aimer ne suffit pas" — 3:24
14. "Lucie" (hidden track)

== Charts ==
=== Weekly charts ===
Chart (2003–2005)	Peak position
Belgian (Wallonia) Albums Chart	6
Canada (ADISQ Quebec)	9
French Albums Chart	3
Polish Albums Chart	17
Swiss Albums Chart	14

=== Year-end charts ===
Chart (2003)	Position
Belgian (Wallonia) Albums Chart	68
French Albums Chart	48
Chart (2004)	Position
Belgian (Wallonia) Albums Chart	30
French Albums Chart	45
Chart (2005)	Position
French Albums Chart	198

== Certifications ==
Region	Certification	Certified units/sales
Belgium (BRMA)	Gold	25,000^{*}
France (SNEP)	Platinum	300,000^{*}
^{*} Sales figures based on certification alone.
