= Natasha St-Pier (album) =

Studio album by Natasha St-Pier
- Released: 18 November 2008 (France)
- Genre: Pop
- Length: 38:56
- Label: Sony BMG France/Columbia

Natasha St-Pier chronology
Longueur d’ondes (2006)	Natasha St-Pier (2008)	Tu trouveras... 10 ans de succès (Best of) (2009)

Singles from Natasha St-Pier
- 1. "Embrasse-Moi" Released: Autumn 2008; 2. "1, 2, 3" Released: Spring 2009

Natasha St-Pier is the sixth studio album recorded by Canadian singer Natasha St-Pier. The album was released in November 2008. Two singles were released from the album: "Embrasse-Moi" and "1, 2, 3".

== Background ==
Natasha St Pier followed St Pier's 2006 album Longueur d’ondes. More personal than previous albums, it alluded to St Pier's family history, referred to her Acadian ancestry on songs such as "L’Instinct De Survie.", and contained typical, but less mournful, love songs. "Embrasse-Moi" was the first single release taken from the album.

Produced by Pascal Obispo, it was a collaboration between St Pier and Elodie Hesme. Obispo introduced a mixture of electro and acoustic styles, Olivier Reine oversaw instrumental parts, while the musical programming was directed by X-Cell.

== Track listing ==
1. "Embrasse-moi" - 3:10 (single)
2. "L'Esprit de famille" - 4:29
3. "1, 2, 3" — 4:01 (single)
4. "L'Orient Express" - 2:55
5. "John" - 3:22
6. "Pardonnez-moi" - 3:09
7. "L'Instinct de survie" - 3:16
8. "Où que j'aille" - 3:29
9. "J'irai te chercher" - 3:08
10. "Les Murmures de la fin" - 3:55
11. "On veut plus que de l'amour" - 4:09

== Singles ==
- Embrasse-Moi
- 1, 2, 3.

== Charts ==
Chart (2008–2009)	Peak position
Belgian (Wallonia) Albums Chart	16
Canadian (Quebec) chart: ADISQ	71
French Albums Chart	16
Swiss Albums Chart	63
