= Nos rendez-vous =

Single by Natasha St-Pier

from the album De l'amour le mieux
- B-side: "De l'amour le mieux"
- Released: 27 September 2002
- Recorded: 2002
- Genre: Pop
- Length: 3:04
- Label: Columbia
- Songwriters: Patrice Guirao, Volodia, Gioacchino Maurici
- Producers: Pascal Obispo, Volodia

Natasha St-Pier singles chronology
"Tu trouveras" (2002)	"Nos rendez-vous" (2002)	"Alors on se raccroche" (2003)

"Nos rendez-vous" is a song recorded by Canadian singer Natasha St-Pier. Written by Patrice Guirao, Volodia and Gioacchino Maurici, and produced by Pascal Obispo, it was the second single from St-Pier's third album De l'amour le mieux (2002), and was released on 27 September 2002. It became the singer's sixth-most successful single in terms of peak positions on the French charts, hitting some success, and was later included in St-Pier's best of Tu trouveras... 10 ans de succès (Best of), released in November 2009, on which it appears as the sixth track.

== Chart performance ==
In France, "Nos rendez-vous" debuted at number 16 on the chart edition of 5 October 2002, reached a peak of number 15 in the third week, then dropped and remained for a total of 14 weeks in the top 50 and fell out of the top 100 after 17 weeks. On 17 December 2002, it earned a Silver disc for selling over 125,000 units. In Belgium (Wallonia), it entered the Ultratop 50 on 16 November 2002 at number 28, then jumped to a peak of number 15 and remained for 13 weeks in the top 40. In Switzerland, entered at a peak of number 45 on 24 November 2002, then dropped and fell off the top 100 after 11 weeks. On the pan-European Hot 100 Singles chart compiled by the Music & Media magazine, it reached number 48 in its third week.

== Track listings ==
CD single - Promo

1. "Nos rendez-vous" — 3:04

CD single

1. "Nos rendez-vous" — 3:04
2. "De l'amour le mieux" — 4:10

== Charts ==
=== Weekly charts ===
Weekly chart performance for "Nos rendez-vous"
Chart (2002–2003)	Peak position
Belgium (Ultratop 50 Wallonia)	15
Canada (ADISQ Quebec)	12
Europe (Eurochart Hot 100)	48
France (SNEP)	15
Poland (Polish Airplay Chart)	5
Switzerland (Schweizer Hitparade)	45

=== Year-end charts ===
Year-end chart performance for "Nos rendez-vous"
Chart (2002)	Position
France (SNEP)	90

== Certifications ==
Region	Certification	Certified units/sales
France (SNEP)	Silver	125,000^{*}
^{*} Sales figures based on certification alone.
