= Ce silence =

2005 single by Natasha St-Pier

Single by Natasha St-Pier and Frédéric Chateau

from the album Longueur d’ondes
- B-side: "True Colors"
- Released: 2005 (Canada)
- Genre: Pop rap
- Length: 4:12
- Label: Sony BMG Canada; Sony Music France; Columbia
- Composer: Frédéric Chateau
- Lyricists: Frédéric Chateau; Natasha St-Pier
- Producers: Volodia; Pascal Obispo; Frédéric Chateau

Natasha St-Pier singles chronology
"J'avais quelqu'un" (2005)	"Ce silence" (2005)	"Un ange frappe à ma porte" (2006)

Music video
- "Ce silence" on YouTube

"Ce silence" (English translation: "This silence") is a pop rap duo recorded in 2005 by Canadian singer Natasha St-Pier and French singer Frédéric Chateau. It was released as a commercial single in 2005 (Canada) and 2006 (Europe).

== Writing and production ==
The music was composed by Frédéric Chateau (using the pseudonym "Asdorve"), while the lyrics were written by Chateau and Natasha St-Pier. The song was produced by Chateau, Volodia and Pascal Obispo. It was initially released as a single in Canada in 2005. After appearing on Natasha St-Pier´s fifth album Longueur d'ondes (2006), it was released in Europe as the second single from the album (19 June 2006).

== Content ==
The song is a duet, combining a solo by St-Pier in pop ballad style with a rap backing track by Frédéric Chateau. The rap lyrics of the male singer (Chateau) repeat themes of despair, self-isolation and indifference to others: J’m’enferme dans ma bulle, je n’regarde personne dans les couloirs de mon esprit ('I enclose myself in my bubble, I look at no-one in the corridors of my mind'). In response, the female singer reiterates her love for him and her determination to break into his self-isolation: Ton indifférence m’est la pire des souffrances ('Your indifference is the worst of suffering to me').

The accompanying video reinforces the themes in the lyrics. The male singer is hunched up in duplicated images within a transparent bubble. The woman initially sings looking into the bubble, but then dives into it and swims toward the man to rescue him.

== Chart performance ==
The single was released first in Canada in 2005. In France, the single started at number 30 in the charts from 24 June 2006, climbed to number 28, remaining in the top 100 for a total of 18 weeks. In Belgium (Wallonia), the single started at number 37 on 8 July 2006, and climbed to number 25, remaining 11 weeks in the charts. The single was also released in Poland in 2006, after the good reception there of the single "Un ange frappe à ma porte".

The song was included in the greatest hits album Tu trouveras... 10 ans de succès (Best of), released in November 2009, where it appeared as the twelfth track.

Chart (2006)	Peak position
Belgium (Ultratop 50 Wallonia)	25
France (SNEP)	28
