= Un ange frappe à ma porte =

2006 single by Natasha St-Pier

Single by Natasha St-Pier

from the album Longueur d'ondes
- B-side: "Vivre ou survivre"
- Released: 6 January 2006 (France)
- Genre: Pop
- Length: 3:37
- Label: Sony Music France/Columbia
- Songwriter: Frédéric Château (as "Asdorve")
- Producers: Frédéric Château: Pascal Obispo; Volodia

Natasha St-Pier singles chronology
| "Ce silence" (2005) | "Un ange frappe à ma porte" (2006) | "Tant que j'existerai" (2006) |

Music video
- "Un ange frappe a ma porte" on YouTube

"Un ange frappe à ma porte" (English translation: "An Angel Is Knocking at My Door") is a song recorded by the Canadian singer Natasha St-Pier. Released in 2006 as the lead single from her fifth studio album Longueur d'ondes, it achieved success in France, Belgium (Wallonia), Canada (Quebec) and Switzerland, reaching number one in Belgium and number two in France. The song was included in the greatest hits album Tu trouveras... 10 ans de succès (Best of), released in November 2009, where it appeared as the fifth track.

== Writing, production and release ==
Music and lyrics for the song were written by French singer Frédéric Château under the pseudonym "Asdorve". The song was produced by Château, Volodia and Pascal Obispo.

"Un ange frappe à ma porte" was released in France 6 January 2006. This made the song the first single released in Europe from Longueur d'ondes, the fifth studio album by Natasha St-Pier. However the single "Ce silence", from the same album, had been released in Canada in 2005, prior to the album release.

== Chart performance ==
In France, "Un ange frappe à ma porte" debuted at number six on the chart edition ending on 14 January 2006, then climbed to a peak of number two, and remained on the chart for 26 weeks, three of them spent in the top three. In Belgium (Wallonia), it entered the Ultratop 40 at number eight on 4 February 2006, topped the chart in its seventh week and remained in the top 40 for 22 weeks. In Switzerland, it debuted at a peak of number 19 on 22 January 2006 and remained for 20 weeks on the chart.

In Canada (Quebec), the single debuted on 4 March 2006, peaking at position 14 and remaining for 24 weeks on the chart.

== Track listings ==
- CD single
1. "Un ange frappe à ma porte" — 3:37
2. "Vivre ou survivre" — 3:25
3. "Un ange frappe à ma porte" (video)

== Charts ==
=== Weekly charts ===
Weekly chart performance for "Un ange frappe à ma porte"
| Chart (2006) | Peak position |
|---|---|
| Belgium (Ultratop 50 Wallonia) | 1 |
| Canadian Singles chart (ADISQ Quebec) | 14 |
| France (SNEP) | 2 |
| Switzerland (Schweizer Hitparade) | 19 |

=== Year-end charts ===
Year-end chart performance for "Un ange frappe à ma porte"
| Chart (2006) | Position |
|---|---|
| Belgium (Ultratop 50 Wallonia) | 9 |
| France (SNEP) | 14 |
