= Tant que c'est toi =

2003 single by Natasha St-Pier

Single by Natasha St-Pier

from the album L'instant d'après
- B-side: "Croire"
- Released: 20 October 2003 (France)
- Genre: Pop
- Length: 4:12
- Label: Sony BMG Canada; Sony Music France; Columbia
- Songwriters: Lionel Florence; Julie d'Aimé; Pascal Obispo
- Producers: Pascal Obispo; Volodia

Natasha St-Pier singles chronology
"Por probarlo todo (No se pierde nada)" (2003)	"Tant que c'est toi" (2003)	"Quand on cherche l'amour" (2004)

Music video
- "Tant que c'est toi" on YouTube

"Tant que c'est toi" (English translation: "As long as it's you") is a pop ballad, recorded in 2003 by Canadian singer Natasha St-Pier.

== Writing and production ==
The song was written by Lionel Florence, Julie d'Aimé and Pascal Obispo, and was produced by Obispo and Volodia. It appeared on Natasha St-Pier's fourth album L'instant d'après (2003), and was the first single released from the album, appearing 20 October 2003.

== Content ==
The ballad is sung by a woman to her lover, for whom she is waiting. She reproaches her absent lover that he is always late for their rendezvous, and so each time she fears he will never come: Je ne sais jamais si tu vas venir. Quand je t'attends je peux m'attendre au pire. (I never know if you will come. When I wait for you, I might expect the worst.) The pain of waiting is like travelling a long journey: Peux tu comprendre le chemin que c'est d'attendre? (Can you understand the road that it is to wait?) She imagines the reasons why he always keeps her waiting. However, she ends in confident and joyful anticipation of his arrival: Tant que c'est toi, d'aller l'un vers l'autre, peut importe le temps que ça prendra (As long as it's you, going one towards another, the time it will take matters little.)

The accompanying video reinforces the themes in the lyrics. Images of the woman and her lover alternate, each of them dressed in changing outfits to indicate that the lover's delayed arrival is a recurring event in their relationship. The woman is seen in a variety of private and public settings: in her apartment, at an outdoor café. Meanwhile the lover is seen progressing towards the woman, suddenly remembering the rendezvous, then running through a variety of settings towards his beloved. In the last scenes, he arrives at the rendezvous point, to find her apparently gone, but then turns to see her smiling warmly at him.

== Chart performance ==
In France, the single started at number 11, but then dropped; it nonetheless remained in the top 100 for a total of 21 weeks. In Belgium, the single climbed to number 5 in Wallonia, remaining 18 weeks in the charts. In Poland, the song peaked in July 2004 at number 6, and remained in the top 100 for over 32 weeks. In Switzerland, the song reached number 31.

The song was included in the greatest hits album Tu trouveras... 10 ans de succès (Best of), released in November 2009, where it appeared as the seventh track.

Chart (2003–2004)	Peak position
Belgium (Ultratop 50 Wallonia)	5
Canada (ADISQ Quebec)	37
France (SNEP)	11
Poland (Polish Airplay Chart)	6
Switzerland (Schweizer Hitparade)	31
