= Mourir demain =

Single by Natasha St-Pier and Pascal Obispo

from the album L'Instant d'après
- B-side: "Fan version"
- Released: 18 June 2004
- Recorded: 2003
- Genre: Pop
- Length: 3:37 (album version); 4:08 (fan version)
- Label: Sony Music France/Columbia; Guy Cloutier Communications
- Songwriter(s): Lionel Florence, Asdorve
- Producer(s): Pascal Obispo, Pierre Jaconelli, Volodia

Natasha St-Pier singles chronology
"Quand on cherche l'amour" (2003)	"Mourir demain" (2004)	"Un Ange frappe à ma porte" (2006)

"Mourir demain" is a 2003 song recorded by the Canadian artist Natasha St-Pier. She performed the song as a duet with the French singer Pascal Obispo. It was released on 18 June 2004, as the second single from St-Pier's fourth studio album, L'Instant d'après, on which it features as third track. This song, which has rock sonorities, achieved a great success in France and Belgium (Wallonia), reaching the top ten.

== Song information ==
The text was written by Lionel Florence. The music was composed by Frédéric Chateau (under the pseudonym "Asdorve"). It was available on Obispo's 2004 albums Fan and Studio fan in a longer version. It was also included on many French compilations such as NRJ Music Awards 2005.

The song was covered in 2007 by Yannick Noah, Patricia Kaas, Jenifer Bartoli and Jean-Baptiste Maunier. This version is available on Les Enfoirés' album La Caravane des Enfoirés, as third track.

== Chart performances ==
In France, the single charted for 20 on the singles chart, from 20 June to 31 October 2004. It peaked at number seven in the first and the third weeks and stayed in the top ten for nine weeks. It was certified Gold and was the 31st best-selling single of the year.

Charted for 19 weeks on the Ultratop 40 (the Belgian chart), the song went to number 30 on 26 June, then jumped to number nine and reached number four in the seventh and eighth weeks. It stayed for nine weeks in the top ten and dropped slowly. It was 20th on the Annual Chart.

"Mourir demain" was St-Pier's most successful single in Switzerland in terms of peak position and chart trajectory. The single started at a peak of number 18 on 4 July, then dropped rather slowly on the chart, and totaled 13 weeks in the top 13, 17 weeks in the top 50 and 25 weeks on the chart.

== Track listings ==
- CD single
1. "Mourir demain" (album version) — 3:37
2. "Mourir demain" (fan version) — 4:08
- Digital download
1. "Mourir demain" (album version) — 3:37
2. "Mourir demain" (fan version) — 4:08

== Charts and sales ==
=== Weekly charts ===
Chart (2004)	Peak position
Belgian (Wallonia) Singles Chart	4
Canadian Singles chart (ADISQ Quebec)	23
French Singles Chart	7
Swiss Singles Chart	18

=== Year-end charts ===
Chart (2004)	Position
Belgian (Wallonia) Singles Chart	20
French Airplay Chart	26
French Singles Chart	31
French TV Music Videos Chart	73
Swiss Singles Chart	72

=== Certifications ===
Region	Certification	Certified units/sales
France (SNEP)	Gold	250,000^{*}
^{*} Sales figures based on certification alone.
