= Taillefer & Filles =

Taillefer et filles is a television series is hosted by Claudette Taillefer and her daughter Marie-Josée Taillefer. It aired on Télé-Québec and was produced by Guy Cloutier. This series was made in 1994 under the name Bon appétit! and renamed to Taillefer & filles, in 1998.
