= Grégory Turpin =

French pop singer and songwriter (born 1980)

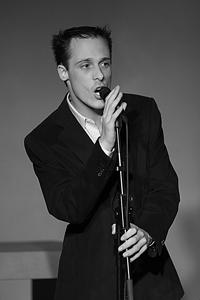
Grégory Turpin

Grégory Turpin is a French pop singer and songwriter. He was born on July 3, 1980, in Saint-Girons, Ariège in south-western France. His three albums have contributed to the rise of spiritual pop music in France.

== Early life ==
Grégory Turpin was born in Ariège to parents who were both shopkeepers. He began making music at the age of twelve, when he started taking guitar lessons. At fifteen he converted to Catholicism, which eventually led him to join the monastic order of Carmel in Montpellier. He was forced to leave the monastery after a year due to serious health problems. Turpin began to make a living performing in bars in Toulouse and soon became a great success as part of the city’s night-life.

== Career ==
In 2005, following his recovery from drug addiction, Turpin began using his artistic talent in the service of others. He has since participated in several initiatives involving young people, held in various cities throughout France. The most notable of these is the 2007 production of the musical comedy Un Lys dans les épines [A Lily Among the Thorns] performed in the city of Châlons-en-Champagne in northern France. The production brought together 70 young people from a variety of backgrounds to tell the history of the Basilique Notre-Dame de l’Epine through the medium of music. The production attracted more than 3,000 audience members.

During this period, Turpin also collaborated on two albums with French spiritual singer Soeur Laetitia and produced his first solo album, Testament, which was released in 2007. Turpin moved to Paris in 2008 to gain access to a larger artistic community and to reach a wider audience with his work. There he recorded his second solo album Attache-moi (Never Let Me Go), which had great impact among the Christian music community. In 2012 he published his autobiography, Clair Obscur [In the Shadows], in which he shares his testimony as to his conversion, his time spent in the monastic order at Carmel, as well as his drug addiction and subsequent recovery.

=== Musical career ===
Although he does not divorce his musical career from his faith, Turpin does not identify himself as a confessional singer. His first album, Testament, released in 2007, saw him marry the musical genre of pop-rock with the rich, mystical lyrics of Soeur Marie du Saint Esprit. He ventured into song-writing with his following album, Attache-moi, released in 2009, in which he addresses the psychological problems fostered by contemporary society. In 2011 he recorded a duet with Israeli singer Nourith Sibony, whom he knew from the musical comedy The Ten Commandments. The track, entitled "Yerushalayim" ("Jerusalem"), is sung in Hebrew and celebrates the shared aspects of the Jewish and Christian faiths, calling for peace in the Holy Land.

In 2012, Turpin was picked by Grégoire Boissenot to feature on the album Thérèse, vivre d’amour [Theresa, a life of love], which was composed by Boissenot and released on April 22, 2013. The album puts the finest poems of Sainte Thérèse de Lisieux to music; Turpin features on three songs, including a duet with Canadian singer and presenter Natasha St-Pier, "Ma seule paix" ["My only peace"], and a solo, "A mes petits frères" ["To my little brothers"], which features as accompaniment the all-boys choir Manécanterie des Petits Chanteurs à la Croix de bois. This album has become platinum-selling since its release.

In July 2014, Turpin was signed by Universal and will be performing at the Olympia Hall in Paris on 6 June 2015. Turpin has also performed at the marriage ceremonies of several celebrities.

=== Philanthropy ===
During his career, Turpin has performed for numerous charities, including the association Tu’toine, sponsored by French actress Nathalie Marquay and the association Action Muco. In 2009, he supported the NGO Casor de menor, founded by Father Renato Chiera, which seeks to educate and care for street children in Brazil. In February 2013 he invited Boissenot and St-Pier to perform at the gala for the charity Fonds de Dotation Soeur Marguerite, of which he is a sponsor.

== Discography ==
- 2005: Petite Thérèse (Little Theresa) Witness production
- 2007: En toute intimité (Total intimacy) AVM diffusion
- 2007: Testament (Testament)
- 2009: Attache-moi (Never let me go) Première Partie
- 2013: Thérèse, Vivre d’amour (Theresa, a life of love) TF1 Music
- 2014: Mes racines (Back to my roots) Première Partie
- 2016: Changer de vie (Change of life) Première Partie

== Bibliography ==
- Turpin, Grégory (2012). Clair Obscur, itinéraire d'un artiste en quête d'absolu [In the Shadows, the life of an artist in search of the absolute]. Éditions Premières Partie. ISBN 9782916539706.
- June 2013: Vivre d’amour (A Life of Love), principal contributor, Editions Michel Lafon.)
