= Glorious (band) =

Christian rock and worship band, from Lyon, France

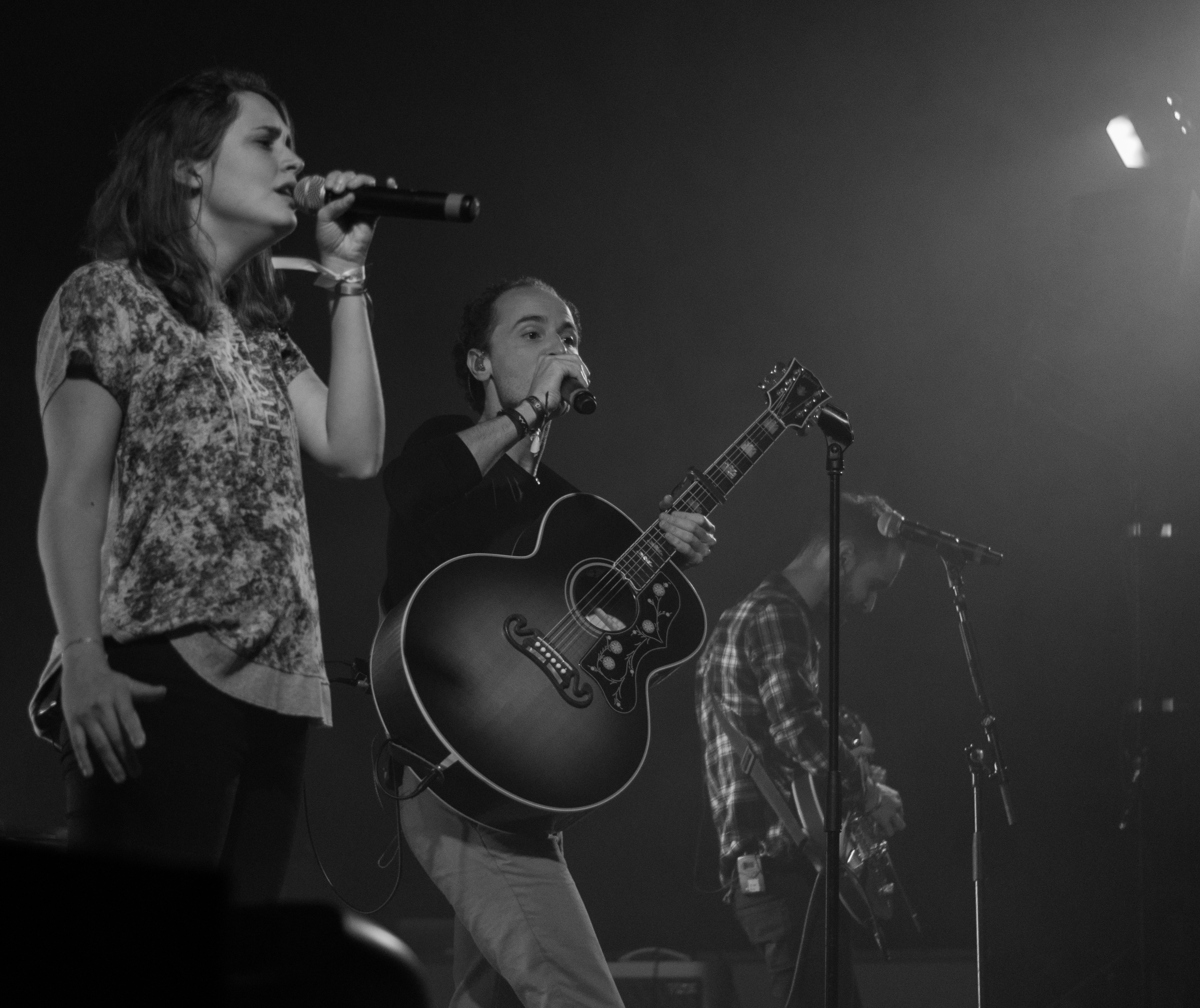
- Glorious in concert at Strasbourg in 2014.

Background information
- Origin: France
- Genres: Christian Rock, électro-pop
- Years active: 2000–present
- Labels: Joy to the World, Rejoyce Musique
- Members: Thomas Pouzin; Benjamin Pouzin; Alexandre Merlin; Pauline Betuel; Obed Rajaiah; Emmanuel Robillard; David Grail; David Allevard
- Past members: Julien Sarazin; Anaël Pin; Aurélien Pouzin; Jean Prat; Gaëtan Verrier Bert; Marie Cazenave (formerly Marie Le Fichant)
- Website: www.glorious.fr

Glorious is a French Catholic rock and worship music group, originally from Valence, Drôme, and based in Lyon, France. It was formed in 2000, following the World Youth Day, by three brothers from Valence.

Since 2000, Glorious has released eleven studio albums published by Rejoyce Musique: Glorious, Libre (Free), Des ombres et des lumières (Shadows and lights), Génération louange (Generation praise), Citoyens des cieux, (Citizens of heaven) Électro pop louange (Electro pop praise), Messe de la grâce (Mass of grace), 1 000 échos, Messe du Frat, (Mass of brotherhood) Noël (Christmas) and Promesse (Promise). They also have three live albums, recorded at the Frat gathering in front of 12,000 young people in 2011, 2013 and 2015, as well as a single Une vie pour une génération (A life for a generation), which is a song tribute to Pope John Paul II This was briefly a best selling single.

The last album, "Promesse", arrived in November 2018.

== History ==
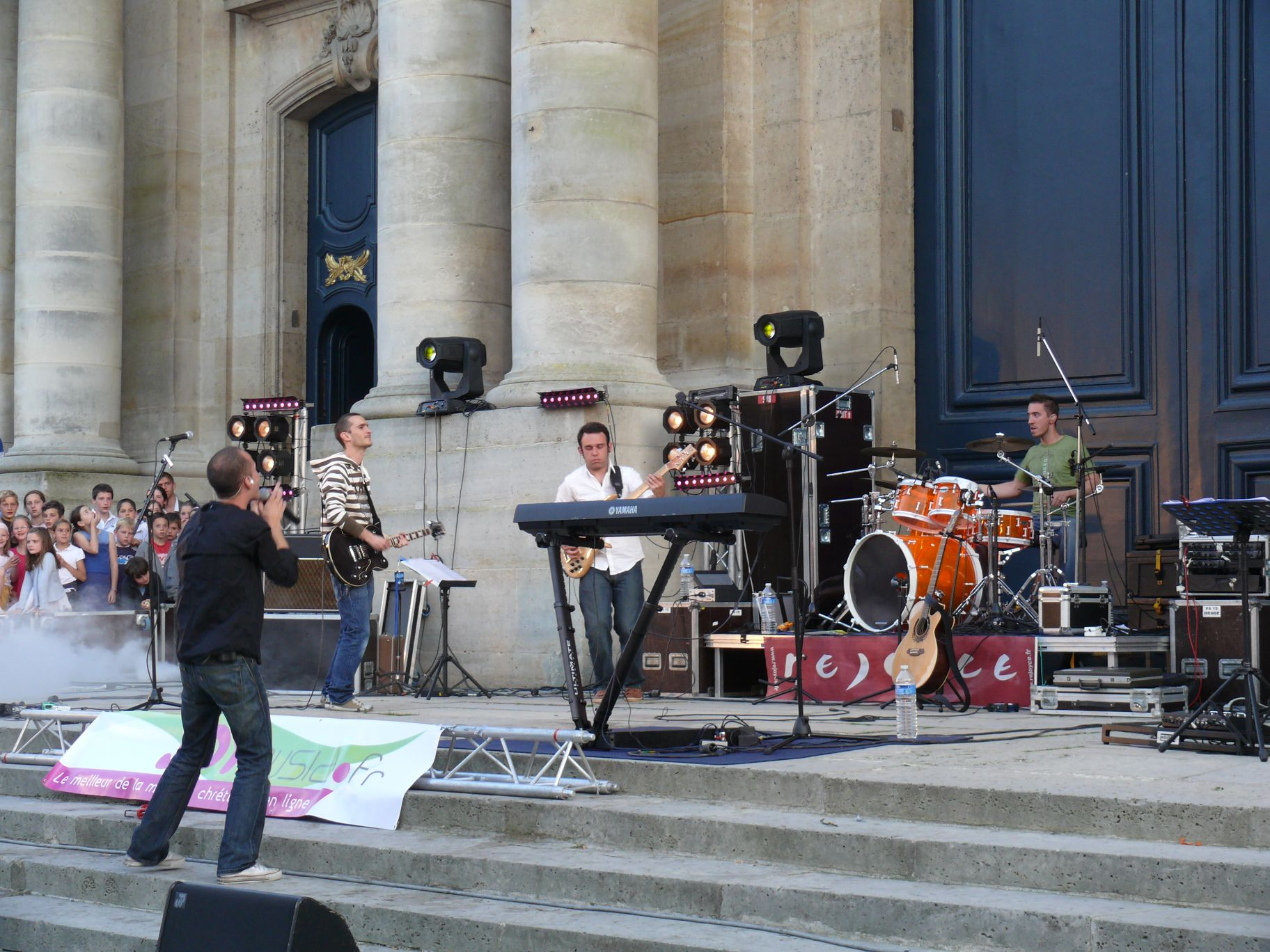
Concert of 24 June 2009 at Versailles.

The group was formed in 2000, following the World Youth Day, by three brothers from Valence: Aurélien, Benjamin and Thomas Pouzin

The group enjoyed good publicity from the release of their first album, Glorious, and they made some television appearances on French national television. They were invited on to Laurent Ruquier On a tout essayé and also Tout le monde en parle, presented by Thierry Ardisson. A report about the group also appeared on France 3 in 2013.

On 15 November 2010 Glorious released their fifth studio album, Citoyens des cieux (Citizens of Heaven) (2010, Joy to the World / Rejoyce), including 11 unreleased pieces of "pop praise" composed from biblical texts. The album was accompanied by a live DVD that delivered the first images of the group on the stage for a series of animated worship evenings in a church in the centre of Lyon (Saint-Croix church): the Lyon Centre evenings.

In April 2013, Glorious released a new studio album titled Électro pop louange (Electro pop praise), which ranked up to 70th place of the iTunes download charts. It was during this year that the group created the Worship Academy (based in their parish Lyon Centre – Sainte-Blandine in Lyon). This is a school of praise that allows a group of young people to spend a year of training in music and theology. The groups Hopen and Be Witness have already gone through this training.

On 4 July 2017, Glorious was on stage in Paris at the Angels Music Awards at Olympia, and supported, for the second time, la musique inspirée.

Glorious released the album "Noël" at the end of 2017, composed of traditional Christmas songs and some compositions.

In 2018, Glorious set to music the poem of Saint Thérèse of Lisieux for the album of Natasha St-Pier Aimer c'est tout donner (To love is to give everything). There are poems set to music as well as songs to Thérèse written and composed by the Pouzin brothers. In late 2018, Glorious released their new album "Promesse", with six clips recorded in their church and a duet with Natasha St-Pier: Le cantique des cantiques ("The Song of Songs").

=== Lyon Centre ===
Lyon Centre is a concept inspired by American evangelical churches. It takes place in the Church of St. Croix, Lyon and meets every Thursday evening. Over 300 young people come each week, with more than 40,000 visitors since its inception up to 2010.

After 2010, the Lyon Centre evenings took place once a month in the St. Croix church and since the end of 2013 at the St. Blandine church, also located in the 2nd arrondissement (district) of Lyon, and host on average 950 visitors each evening.

Currently, Glorious hosts Mass every Sunday night and run the Worship Academy, a school of praise that allows a group of young people to spend a year of training in music and theology so as to serve in evangelization, on a tour and/or by serving in a parish.

The Lyon Centre Conference, a weekend devoted to praise with church groups and preaching given by different speakers, has been held once a year since 2015. Ecumenism is very evident during these conferences, as speakers like the Christian Open Door Church, Mulhouse or Hillsong Church are invited.

Cardinal Philippe Barbarin, former archbishop of Lyon, was the initiator, along with Glorious, of this project. The Lyon Centre model is spreading all over Europe: Albi in France, Bologna in Italy, Barcelona in Spain.

== Members ==
=== Current members ===
- Thomas Pouzin – piano, guitar, vocals
- Benjamin Pouzin – guitar, vocals
- Emmanuel Robillard – bass
- David Grail – drums
- David Allevard – drums
- Obed Rajaiah – keyboard
- Pauline Bethuel – vocals

=== Former members ===
- Julien Sarazin – bass
- Anaël Pin – keyboard
- Aurélien Pouzin – guitar
- Jean Prat – drums
- Gaëtan Verrier Bert – guitar
- Marie Cazenave (formerly Marie Le Fichant) – vocals

== Discography ==
=== Studio albums ===
Glorious

- Released: 2002
- Tracks:
1. Au cœur des montagnes
2. Je bénirai
3. Le seigneur des seigneurs
4. Levons les yeux
5. Amen Alléluia
6. Père
7. Seigneur je viens
8. Esprit-Saint
9. Jour de gloire
10. Demeure en nous
11. Je loue Dieu
12. Jubilez
13. Unis par Dieu
14. Puisque ce jour vient

Libre

- Released: 2003
- Tracks:
1. Voir un autre monde
2. Je m'envole
3. Je veux vivre
4. Nos âmes
5. Tu seras toujours là
6. Libre
7. Le temps est venu
8. Près de toi
9. Laisse-toi guider
10. Sans toi
11. The Jesus freaks' song
12. Rejoins-nous

Des ombres et des lumières

- Released: 2006
- Tracks:
1. Seul
2. Donne moi
3. Partir
4. Un monde
5. Je viens de toi
6. Petite étoile
7. Intime
8. Viens
9. Ma vérité
10. Éternité
11. Frère
12. Elle

Génération louange

- Released: 2008
- Tracks:
1. Nous élevons nos mains vers toi
2. Vivre unis
3. Voici notre Dieu
4. Vous recevrez une force
5. Pour toi
6. Prince humilié
7. Bénissez le Seigneur
8. Viens Jésus
9. Si vous demeurez en Moi
10. Saint-Esprit viens
11. Je Te vois
12. Au cœur de la louange
13. Ave Maria

Citoyens des Cieux

- Released: 2010
- Tracks:
1. Nous voici Jérusalem
2. Hosanna Ho
3. Enflammés
4. Alléluia Hé
5. Ta Grâce
6. J'attendrai
7. Ma Génération
8. Bondissez
9. Tu es mon Dieu
10. Sa Miséricorde
11. Nous voulons Te louer

Electro pop louange

- Released: 2013
- Tracks:
1. Au milieu de nous
2. Nous dansons
3. Dans la joie
4. Emmanuel
5. Ta Majesté
6. Devant Toi
7. Il est bon de louer Dieu
8. Nous T'adorons
9. Tu viens pour moi
10. Exultet
11. Jésus
12. #disleaumonde

Messe de la Grâce (en collaboration avec Hopen)

- Released: 2015
- Tracks:
1. Le Dieu fidèle
2. Je reviens vers toi
3. Gloire à Dieu
4. Alléluia
5. Tu es saint
6. Notre père
7. Agneau de Dieu
8. Vienne Ta Grâce
9. Louez-Le

1,000 échos

- Tracks:
1. Une symphonie
2. Plus jamais le même
3. Bienvenue
4. Le chant du Père
5. Christ seul
6. Relever le faible
7. Ma passion
8. Tout sera grand
9. Là il y avait un jardin (Feat. Exo)
10. Que ma bouche chante Ta louange
11. Bondissez
12. Vienne Ta Grâce

Messe du frat (fraternel 2017)

- Released: 2017
- Tracks:
1. Nos mains vers le ciel
2. Prends pitié
3. Gloire à Dieu
4. Viens Esprit-Saint
5. Alléluia
6. Saint le Seigneur
7. Anamnèse
8. Agneau de Dieu
9. Le signe de croix
10. Nos mains vers le ciel (O.Rajaiah Remix)

Noël

- Released: 2017
- Tracks:
1. C'est Noël ce soir !
2. Minuit Chrétiens
3. Les Anges dans nos campagnes
4. Douce Nuit
5. Emmanuel
6. Anges Archanges
7. Peuple Fidèle
8. Il est né le Divin Enfant
9. Splendeur (musical)

Promesse

- Released: 2018
- Tracks:
1. Enfant de Dieu
2. Pour moi Tu l’as fait
3. Credo
4. Libre & Sauvé
5. Le Cantique des cantiques (Feat Natasha St Pier)
6. Quand Tu poses Ta main
7. Tu seras la louange
8. En couleurs
9. Gethsémani
10. Saint-Esprit (Voici mon cœur)
11. Jamais rien n’arrêtera notre louange

=== Singles ===
- 2005 : Une vie pour une génération, single in homage to Pope John Paul II
- 2011 : En Cristo, song for the JMJ 2011
- 2012 : Nous dansons
- 2014 : † = ♥ #DisLeAuMonde
- 2015 : Notre Père
- 2015 : Louez-Le
- 2016 : Bienvenue, premier single du nouvel album, 1000 Échos
- 2016 : Plus jamais le même
- 2016 : Relever le faible
- 2016 : Ave Maria with the young singers of Saint-Thomas d'Aquin
- 2018 : Le Cantique des Cantiques (Duo with Natasha St-Pier)

=== Live albums ===
Live Frat 2011

- Released: 2011
- Tracks:
1. Un chant nouveau (live)
2. Bondissez (live)
3. Qu'as-tu à donner ? (live)
4. Enflammés (live)
5. Ta Grâce (live)
6. Alléluia Hé (live)
7. Vous recevrez une force (live)
8. Il est vivant (live)
9. Tu es mon Dieu (live)
10. Nous élevons nos mains ver Toi (live)
11. Bonus Track – Qu'as-tu à donner ? (version studio)

Live Frat 2013

- Released: 2013
- Tracks:
1. Nous dansons (live)
2. Des cris de joie (live)
3. Ta grâce (live)
4. Comment ne pas Te louer (live)
5. Ma génération (live)
6. Nous annonçons le Roi (live)

Fraternel (2015)

- Released: 2015
- Tracks:
1. Des milliers (hymne du frat 2015)
2. Dis-le au monde (Live)
3. Nous dansons (Live)
4. Notre Père (Live)
5. Dans la joie (Live)
6. Des milliers (Remix)
