= Mickaël Miro =

French singer-songwriter

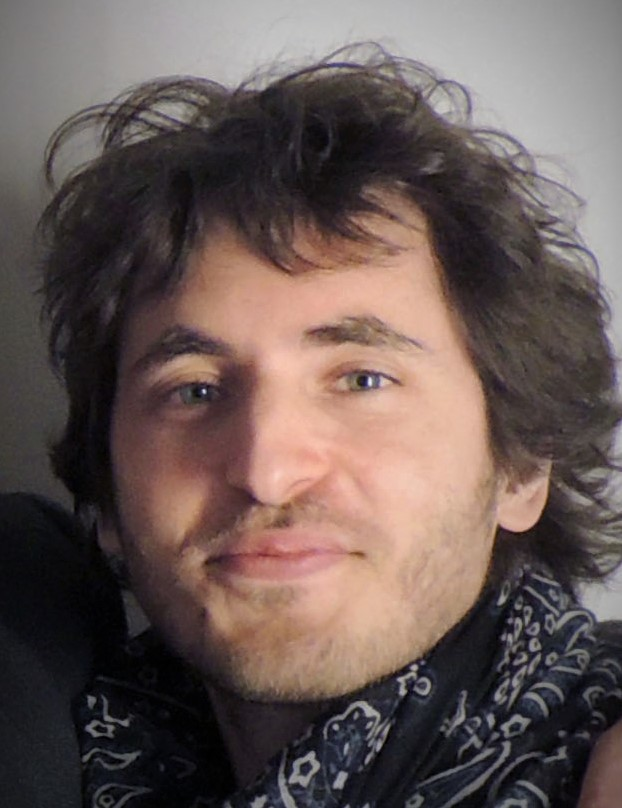

Background information
- Born: 8 November 1978; Lyon, France
- Genres: French pop
- Years active: 2010-present
- Labels: Mercury
- Website: www.mickaelmiro.com

Mickaël Miro (born 8 November 1978 as Mickaël Cohen) is a French singer-songwriter. His name is a pseudonym, which he chose as a tribute to his grandfather, who was called Miro. He is best known for his debut single "L'Horloge Tourne", followed by his debut album Juste comme ça in 2011.

== Early life and education ==
Born in Lyon, Mickaël Miro studied business law in college and started writing many songs while studying.

== Career ==
He sticks to the tradition of French songs, influenced by what he calls French "BCBG" (meaning Balavoine, Cabrel, Berger, and Goldman).

In 2007, he took part in a musical collective "Les Marguerites" for fighting against Alzheimer appearing in the single "J'y étais pas" and later was signed to Midi52/EMI. In 2008, he toured with the rock group ANESA, opening for their shows.

In October 2010, he released his debut single "L'Horloge Tourne" with great success, followed by his debut album Juste comme ça, which contains collaborations with Natasha St Pier in duo. "Ma scandaleuse" became the second single release from the album. He also appeared in a number of television variety shows including Taratata and Tous Ensemble.

== Awards ==
- On 30 December 2011, his single "L'Horloge Tourne" won the award for "The Song of the Year 2011" in year-end program broadcast on TF1, called "La Chanson de l'année", presented by Nikos Aliagas.
- On 28 January 2012, he was nominated in the category "Francophone Revelation of the Year" at the NRJ Music Awards 2012.

== Discography ==
=== Albums ===
Year	Album	Charts			Certification
Year	Album	BEL Wa	FR	SWI	Certification
2011	Juste comme ça	10	9	—	
2013	Le Temps des sourires	24	16	—	

=== Singles ===
Year	Single	Charts			Certification	Album
Year	Single	BEL Wa	FR	SWI	Certification	Album
2010	"L'Horloge tourne"	1 (Ultratop)	8	56		Juste comme ça
2011	"Ma scandaleuse"	2 (Ultratip)	97	—		Juste comme ça
2011	"Laisse-moi m'en aller"	7 (Ultratip)				Juste comme ça
2012	"La vie simplement"	25 (Ultratip)	101			Le Temps des sourires
2012	"Go Go Go"	25 (Ultratip)	101			Le Temps des sourires
2013	"J'apprendrai"	25 (Ultratip)	101			-
