= Longueur d'ondes =

Longueur d’ondes

Studio album by Natasha St-Pier
- Released: 16 January 2006 (France)
- Genre: Pop
- Length: 46:30
- Label: Sony BMG France/Columbia

Natasha St-Pier chronology
L'instant d'après (2004)	Longueur d’ondes (2006)	Natasha St-Pier (2008)

Singles from Longueur d'ondes
- 1. "Un Ange frappe à ma porte" Released: January 2006; 2. "Ce Silence" Released: June 2006; 3. "Tant que j'existerai" Released: December 2006

Longueur d'ondes (Wavelength) is the fifth studio album recorded by the Canadian singer Natasha St-Pier, and was released on 13 January 2006. It achieved a great success in France, topping the albums and digital charts: It was also successful in Belgium, Canada, Poland and Switzerland. The album's lead single, "Un ange frappe à ma porte", was the most-played French single across the world during 2006.

== Track listing ==
1. "Un ange frappe à ma porte" (single) — 4:08
2. "Longueur d’ondes" — 3:54
3. "Ce silence" (feat. Frédéric Château, single) — 3:52
4. "J’oublie" — 3:32
5. "Tiens-moi à la vie" — 3:35
6. "Je peux tout quitter" — 3:33
7. "À l’amour comme à la guerre" — 5:22
8. "Tant que j’existerai" (single) — 2:58
9. "Comme dans un train" — 3:48
10. "Je traverserai" — 3:54
11. "Je fais comme si" — 3:45
12. "De nous" — 3:50

+ "Un ange frappe à ma porte" (video)

== Certifications ==
Country	Certification	Date	Sales certified	Physical sales	Digital downloads
France	Gold	June 16, 2006	100,000	163,544 in 2006	2,873 in 2006

== Charts ==
=== Weekly charts ===
Chart (2006)	Peak position
Belgian (Wallonia) Albums Chart	2
Canadian (Quebec) chart: ADISQ	13
French Albums Chart	1
French Digital Chart	1
Polish Albums Chart	29
Swiss Albums Chart	11

=== Year-end charts ===
Chart (2006)	Position
Belgian (Wallonia) Albums Chart	12
French Albums Chart	39
French Digital Chart	26
