= Je n'ai que mon âme =

2001 single by Natasha St-Pier

Single by Natasha St-Pier

from the album À chacun son histoire
- Released: April 30, 2001 (France)
- Recorded: late 2000-early 2001, Canada
- Genre: Pop
- Length: 2:51
- Label: Trema, Columbia Records
- Songwriter: Robert Goldman (under the pseudonym "Jill Kapler")
- Producers: Christophe Battaglia; Jill Kapler

Natasha St-Pier singles chronology
"Je t'aime encore" (2000)	"Je n'ai que mon âme" (2001)	"Tu m'envoles" (2001)

Alternative cover
- Alternative cover

Eurovision Song Contest 2001 entry
- Country: France
- Artist: Natasha St-Pier
- Languages: French, English
- Composer: Robert Goldman (as Jill Kapler)
- Lyricist: Robert Goldman (as Jill Kapler)

Finals performance
- Final result: 4th
- Final points: 142

Entry chronology
- ◄ "On aura le ciel" (2000)
- "Il faut du temps" (2002) ►

Official performance video
- "Je n'ai que mon âme" on YouTube

"Je n'ai que mon âme" (French pronunciation: [ʒə nɛ k(ə) mɔ̃n‿ɑm]; English translation: "I only have my soul") is a song by Natasha St-Pier, the French entry in the Eurovision Song Contest 2001. It was sung mainly in French, with some lyrics in English (the first time a French entry contained any English lyrics). The song was released in Canada as the lead single from the compilation album carrying the same name Je n'ai que mon âme. Outside Canada, the song appeared as a track on the European version of the studio album À chacun son histoire. St-Pier also recorded an English version with the title "All I Have is My Soul".

== Eurovision ==
The song was performed fourteenth on the night, following Spain's David Civera with "Dile que la quiero" and preceding Turkey's Sedat Yüce with "Sevgiliye son". At the close of voting, it had received 142 points (12 points from Bosnia and Herzegovina, Portugal and Russia), placing 4th in a field of 23.

The song is a power ballad, with St-Pier attempting to resurrect what appears to be a doomed relationship, telling her lover that she still has feelings for him, even though neither of them have expressed them recently.

It was succeeded as French representative at the 2002 contest by Sandrine François with "Il faut du temps".

== Chart performance ==
In France, the single charted for 26 weeks in the top 100. It started at number 11 on 5 May 2001, then reached the top ten and peaked at number two in the sixth and seventh weeks. It was unable to dislodge MC Solaar's "Hasta la vista" which topped the chart then. Then the single dropped almost continuously on the chart, totalling nine weeks in the top ten and 19 weeks in the top 50. It achieved Gold status awarded by the SNEP, and was 28th on the Annual Chart.

In Wallonia, Belgium, "Je n'ai que mon âme" debuted at number 11 on 12 May 2001, jumped to number three and hit number two the two weeks later, behind Daddy DJ's eponymous single, then dropped and remained for seven weeks in the top ten and 12 weeks in the top 40. It was the 17th best-selling single of the year. On the pan-European Hot 100 Singles chart compiled by Music & Media, it reached number 12 in its seventh week in the chart.

== Track listings ==
- CD single
1. "Je n'ai que mon âme" — 2:51
2. "All I Have Is My Soul" — 2:51
3. "Près d'une autre" — 5:29

== Charts ==
=== Weekly charts ===
Weekly chart performance for "Je n'ai que mon âme"
Chart (2001)	Peak position
Belgium (Ultratop 50 Wallonia)	2
Canada (ADISQ Quebec)	4
Europe (Eurochart Hot 100)	12
France (SNEP)	2

=== Year-end charts ===
Year-end chart performance for "Je n'ai que mon âme"
Chart (2001)	Position
Belgium (Ultratop 50 Wallonia)	17
France (Airplay Chart)	94
France (SNEP)	28

== Certifications ==
Certifications for "Je n'ai que mon âme"
Region	Certification	Certified units/sales
France (SNEP)	Gold	250,000^{*}
^{*} Sales figures based on certification alone.
