= Les Stentors =

French musical supergroup

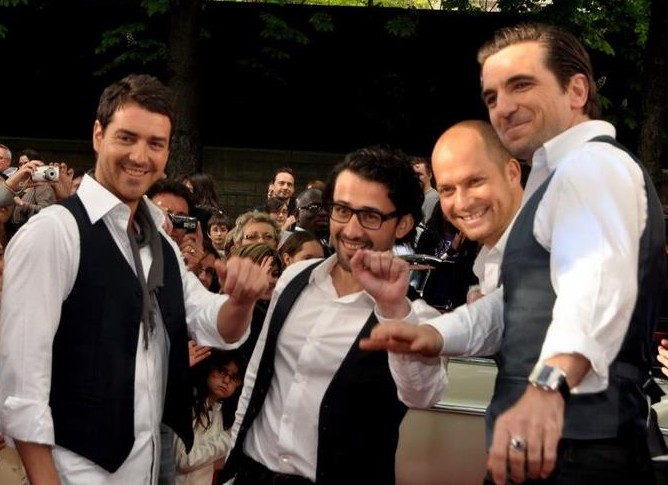
- Les Stentors in 2012

Background information
- Genres: Operatic pop, vocal
- Years active: 2010–present
- Label: Sony
- Members: Vyanney Guyonnet; Mowgli Laps; Sébastien Lemoine; Mathieu Sempere
- Website: lesstentors.com

Les Stentors are a 4-member vocal super group made up of operatic voices from all regions of France.

Their self-titled debut album, Les Stentors, was released in 2010. Their second album Voyage en France, released on 14 May 2012, was an immediate success, shooting straight to #1 on the SNEP, the Official French Albums Chart, in its first week of release.

== Members ==
- Vyanney Guyonnet - baritone
- Mowgli Laps - tenor
- Sébastien Lemoine - bass
- Mathieu Sempere - tenor

== Discography ==
=== Albums ===
Year	Album	Charts			Certification
Year	Album	FR	BEL (Wa)	SWI	Certification
2010	Les Stentors	—	—	—	
2012	Voyage en France	1	5	26	
2013	Une histoire de France	3	7	46	
2014	Rendez-vous au cinéma	2	11	83	
2017	Ma patrie	19	33	98	
2017	Les Stentors chantent Noël	84	—	—	

=== Singles ===
Year	Single	Charts	Certification	Album
Year	Single	FR	Certification	Album
2012	"Les corons"	130		
2013	"Le chant des partisans"	102		
2014	"Vois sur ton chemin"	186		
