= Robert Goldman (songwriter) =

French songwriter (born 1953)

Robert Goldman (born 1953) is a French songwriter. He was born in Paris. Goldman is the son of Jewish émigrés Alter Mojze Goldman and Ruth Ambrunn who were Jewish Resistance fighters during the Second World War. He is the younger brother of Jean-Jacques Goldman and half-brother of Pierre Goldman. He is of German-Jewish and Polish-Jewish descent.

He has written more than 50 songs for many French-speaking singers such as Céline Dion. He often signed J Kapler.

== Songs composed by Robert Goldman/J.Kapler ==
=== Vanessa Amorosi ===
- "Champagne, Champagne" (B.O Absolument fabuleux, 2001)

=== France D'Amour ===
- Ce qui me reste de toi (France d'Amour, 2002)
- Je n'irai pas ailleurs (France d'Amour, 2002)
- Le bonheur me fait peur (France d'Amour, 2002)
- Quand je me love en toi (France d'Amour, 2002)
- Que des mots (France d'Amour, 2002)
- Vous étiez (France d'Amour, 2002)

=== Lisa Angell ===
- N'oubliez pas (2015)

=== Tina Arena ===
- Aller plus haut (In deep, 1999)
- S'il faut prier (Un Autre Univers, 2005)
- Tu aurais dû me dire (Un Autre Univers, 2005)

=== Chimène Badi ===
- Le jour d'après (Dis-moi que tu m'aimes, 2004)
- J'aurais préféré (Dis-moi que tu m'aimes, 2004)
- Le chant des hommes (Le miroir, 2006)
- N'oublie pas (Le miroir, 2006)

=== Isabelle Boulay ===
- Parle-moi (Mieux qu'ici-bas, 2000)
- Quelques pleurs (Mieux qu'ici-bas, 2000)
- Quand vos cœurs m'appellent (Mieux qu'ici-bas, 2000)
- Sans toi (Au moment d'être à vous, 2002)

=== Noémie Christiaens ===
- J'étais prête (?, 2004)

=== Céline Dion ===
- I don't know (Falling into You, 1996)
- Je sais pas (D'eux, 1995)
- Je t'aime encore (anglais) (One heart, 2003)
- Je t'aime encore (français) (1 fille et 4 types, 2003)
- Valse adieu (1 fille et 4 types, 2003)
- Zora sourit (S'il suffisait d'aimer, 1998)

=== Lauren Faure ===
- Une femme qui pleure (Regards de femme, 2002)

=== Florence ===
- Si demain ne sert à rien (Poker menteur, 2003)

=== Patricia Kaas ===
- Je le garde pour toi (Sexe fort, 2003)

=== Claire Keim ===
- Je ne veux qu'elle (Marc Lavoine, 2001) en duo avec Marc Lavoine

=== Angélique Kidjo ===
- Ne cédez jamais (Black Ivory Soul, 2002)

=== Marc Lavoine ===
- Je ne veux qu'elle (Marc Lavoine, 2001) en duo avec Claire Keim, sous le pseudonyme de Moïse Albert

=== Frédéric Lerner ===
- Si tu m'entends (On partira, 2000)

=== Marilou ===
- Aimer (La fille qui chante, 2005)

=== Sofia Mestari ===
- Derrière les voiles (2001)

=== Yannick Noah ===
- Angela (Frontières, 2010)
- Couleurs d'aimer (Charango, 2006)
- Frontières (Frontières, 2010)
- J'aurais dû comprendre (Pokhara, 2003)
- Jamafrica (Yannick Noah, 2000)
- La voix des sages (Yannick Noah, 2000)
- Laissez-nous essayer (Pokhara, 2003)
- Madingwa (Yannick Noah, 2000)
- Quand ils sont là (Pokhara, 2003)
- Simon Papa Tara (Yannick Noah, 2000)
- Si tu savais (Pokhara, 2003)
- Te quiero (Charango, 2006)
- Un jour « le combat » (Charango, 2006)
- Yessaï (Pokhara, 2003)

=== Florent Pagny ===
- Une place pour moi (A/C Jean-Jacques Goldman / J. Kapler – Erick Benzi, Savoir aimer, 1997)

=== Michel Sardou ===
- Cette chanson n'en est pas une (Hors format, 2006)
- Dis-moi (Du plaisir, 2004)
- Du plaisir (Du plaisir, 2004)
- J'ai tant d'amour (Du plaisir, 2004)
- Je n'oublie pas (Du plaisir, 2004)
- Le chant des hommes (Hors format, 2006)
- Le cœur migrateur (Hors format, 2006)
- Loin (Du plaisir, 2004)
- Même si (Du plaisir, 2004)
- Nuit de satin (Hors format, 2006)

=== Natasha St-Pier ===
- All I Have Is My Soul (2001)
- Je n'ai que mon âme (A chacun son histoire, 2001)
- Pourquoi tant de larmes (De l'amour le mieux, 2002)

=== Roch Voisine ===
- Dis-lui (Roch Voisine, 2001)
- Julia (Roch Voisine, 2001)
- Kibera (Roch Voisine, 2001)
- Un océan de peine (Roch Voisine, 2001)

=== Francky Vincent ===
- Retourne-toi (under pseudonym : Yvon et Jacques Hulet)

=== Julie Zenatti ===
- Je voudrais que tu me consoles (Comme vous, 2004)
- Rendez-moi le silence (Comme vous, 2004)
