= The Little Singers of Paris =

French boys' choir

The Little Singers of Paris Les Petits Chanteurs à la Croix de Bois
- Choir
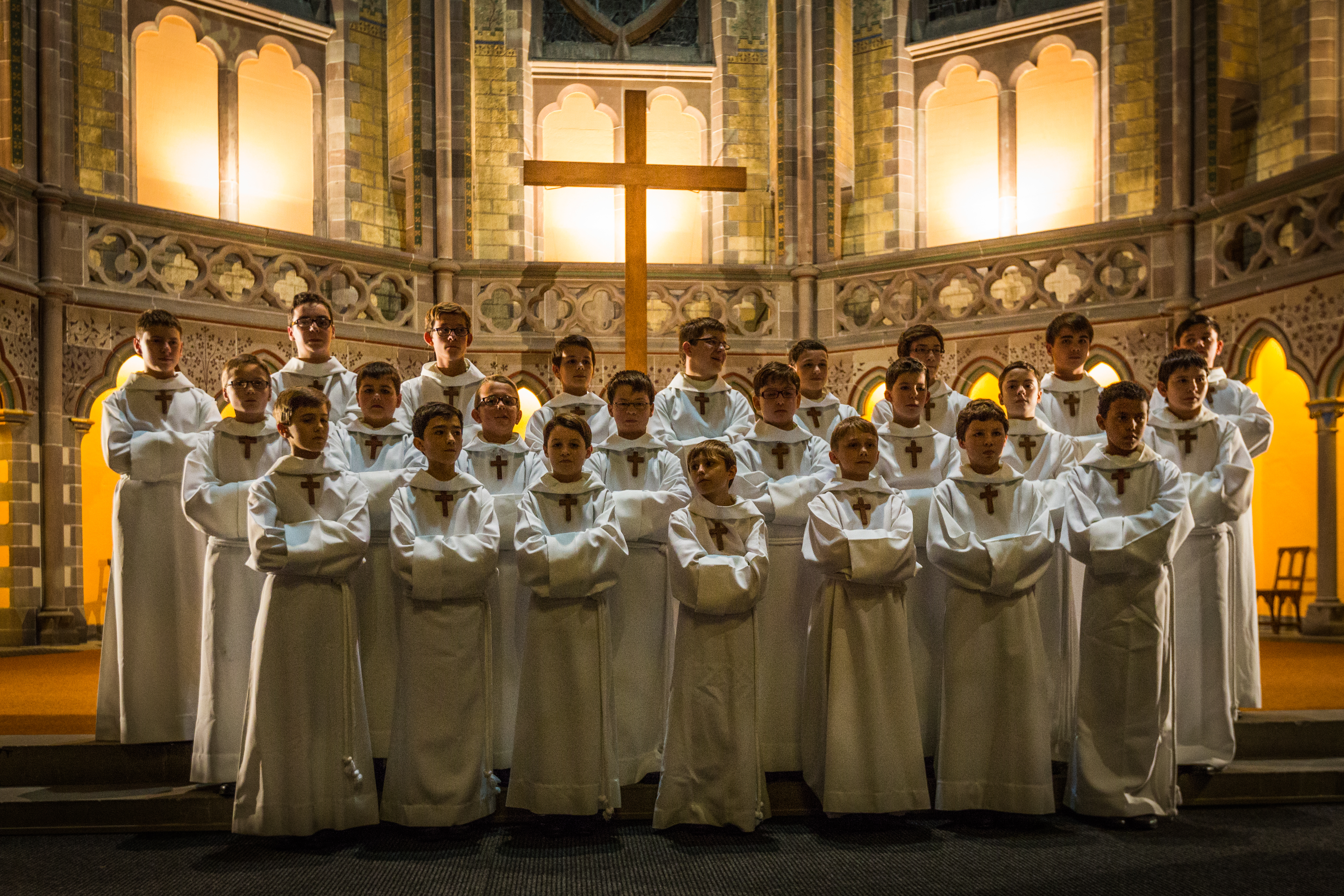
- Origin: Paris, France
- Founded: 1907 (118 years ago)
- Headquarters: Autun, France
- Website: pccb.fr

The Little Singers of Paris (French: Les Petits Chanteurs à la Croix de Bois, literally "Little Singers of the Wooden Cross") is a boys' choir with its main location in Autun, France.

It has its origins in 1907 in Paris. It moved to Lyon during the Second World War, but moved back to Paris. It has toured widely inside and outside France.

The aim of its founders was to form a choir that would travel from place to place and bring to the people the splendors of Gregorian chant and Palestrinian music. Since then, and over 17,000 concerts later, secular and traditional world music has been added to their repertoire.

Drawn from the less privileged, the boys join the choir school at 9 or 10 years of age and remain until their 15th birthday. The choirboys board during the week, and the musical and educational curriculum that they follow is adapted specifically for them. Each year they undertake approximately seven national tours of France and three international tours.

Darius Milhaud, who wrote the ‘Cantata of Peace’ for the Little Singers in 1937, called the school "a miracle of faith, tenacity, enthusiasm and talent".

The Little Singers head an international federation, the ‘Pueri Cantores’ numbering about 2,000 groups and including almost 80,000 singers throughout the world. On tour, the Little Singers number 60 to 70 voices led by Jean-Baptiste Pineault and Mr Thomas, the choirmasters.

== See also ==
- Paul Berthier
- Boys' choir
- Vienna Boys' Choir
