= Guy Cloutier =

Canadian music producer and talent manager

Guy Cloutier (born 11 February 1940 in Chicoutimi, Quebec, Canada) is a Canadian music producer and talent manager.

Cloutier adapted reality TV to the Quebec market. Entertainers Stéphanie Cloutier and Véronique Cloutier are his daughters. His daughter, Stephanie, is married to former NHL goalie Jose Theodore.

On 20 December 2004, he was sentenced to 3 1/2 years (42 months) in prison for sexually abusing singer Nathalie Simard.

== Career ==
Cloutier started in managing and music production by forming Productions Guy Cloutier in 1969 and became famous for launching the career of child singing sensation René Simard. He produced Loft Story, a made-in-Quebec reality TV show, and Taillefer & filles, a cooking show where mother and daughter Claudette and Marie-Josée Taillefer cook their favourite meals in front of a studio audience.

== Abuse ==
In 2004 Cloutier pleaded guilty to five charges, including sexual assault, indecent exposure and sex with a minor. He served 19 months of a 42-month sentence. It was later revealed that one of the victims was Nathalie Simard, who was under contract with Cloutier. He also entered a guilty plea to a charge of indecent exposure involving another minor whose name and gender were not made public. He received a 16-month sentence in that case.

== Guy Cloutier Communications ==
His company, Productions Guy Cloutier, became Novem Communications in October 2004 when control passed to his daughter Véronique. In October 2009, Véronique sold her shares to Francois Ferland.
