= Everybody (Tanel Padar and Dave Benton song) =

2001 song by Tanel Padar and Dave Benton

Single by Tanel Padar and Dave Benton
- Released: 2001
- Genre: House; disco
- Length: 3:00
- Label: Universal
- Composer: Ivar Must
- Lyricist: Maian-Anna Kärmas

Eurovision Song Contest 2001 entry
- Country: Estonia
- Artists: Tanel Padar and Dave Benton
- With: 2XL
- Language: English
- Composer: Ivar Must
- Lyricist: Maian-Anna Kärmas

Finals performance
- Final result: 1st
- Final points: 198

Entry chronology
- ◄ "Once in a Lifetime" (2000)
- "Runaway" (2002) ►

Official performance video
- "Everybody" on YouTube

"Everybody" is a song recorded by Tanel Padar and Dave Benton, along with 2XL, with music composed by Ivar Must and lyrics written by Maian-Anna Kärmas. It represented Estonia in the Eurovision Song Contest 2001 held in Copenhagen, resulting in the country's only ever win at the contest and the first victory by one of the countries that debuted in the contest in the 1990s after the fall of the Iron Curtain.

== Background ==
=== Conception ===
"Everybody" was composed by Ivar Must with lyrics by Maian-Anna Kärmas. Lyrically, the song is simply an invitation to party, with the duo singing that "every night's a Friday night".

=== Eurovision ===
On 3 February 2001, "Everybody" performed by Tanel Padar and Dave Benton, with 2XL providing the backing vocals –Lauri Pihlap, Kaido Põldma, Sergei Morgun, and Indrek Soom–, competed in Eurolaul 2001, the national final organised by Eesti Televisioon (ETV) to select its song and performer for the 46th edition of the Eurovision Song Contest. The song won the competition so it became the Estonian entry for Eurovision. Tanel had previously provided backing vocals for Estonia's 2000 entry, "Once in a Lifetime" sung by Eda-Ines Etti, his girlfriend at the time.

On 12 May 2001, the Eurovision Song Contest was held at the Parken Stadium in Copenhagen hosted by the Danish Broadcasting Corporation (DR), and broadcast live throughout the continent. Padar and Benton, along 2XL, performed "Everybody" twentieth on the evening, following Germany's "Wer Liebe lebt" by Michelle and preceding Malta's "Another Summer Night" by Fabrizio Faniello.

At the close of voting, the song had received 198 points (receiving a maximum of 12 points from Greece, Latvia, Lithuania, Malta, Netherlands, Poland, Slovenia, Turkey, and the United Kingdom), with the win coming at the head of a twenty-three-song field. Benton became the first black contestant to win the contest and, to date, is the oldest person to do so. The song was followed as Estonian representative at the 2002 contest, held in the Estonian capital of Tallinn, by "Runaway" by Sahlene.

== Track listings ==
CD single

1. "Everybody" (Original Version) – 2:56
2. "Everybody" (Instrumental) – 2:56

CD Maxi-single

1. "Everybody" (Original Version) – 3:00
2. "Everybody" (Pierre J's Radio Mix) – 3:39
3. "Everybody" (Pierre J's Club Mix) – 7:06
4. "Everybody" (Instrumental) – 2:57

== Charts ==
=== Weekly charts ===
Chart (2001)	Peak position
Belgium (Ultratip Bubbling Under Flanders)	3
Belgium (Ultratip Bubbling Under Wallonia)	14
Germany (GfK)	99
Netherlands (Single Top 100)	64
Sweden (Sverigetopplistan)	12

== Legacy ==
Maarja-Liis Ilus has recorded a cover version.

Preceded by "Fly on the Wings of Love" by Olsen Brothers	Eurovision Song Contest winners 2001	Succeeded by "I Wanna" by Marie N
