= Germany in the Eurovision Song Contest 2001 =

- Eurovision Song Contest 2001
- Participating broadcaster: ARD (Note: Arbeitsgemeinschaft der öffentlich-rechtlichen Rundfunkanstalten der Bundesrepublik Deutschland) – Norddeutscher Rundfunk (NDR)
- Country: Germany
- Selection process: Countdown Grand Prix Eurovision 2001
- Selection date: 2 March 2001

Competing entry
- Song: "Wer Liebe lebt"
- Artist: Michelle
- Songwriters: Gino Trovatello; Matthias Stingl; Eva Richter

Placement
- Final result: 8th, 66 points

Participation chronology

Germany was represented at the Eurovision Song Contest 2001 with the song "Wer Liebe lebt" written by Gino Trovatello, Matthias Stingl, and Eva Richter, and performed by Michelle. The German participating broadcaster on behalf of ARD, Norddeutscher Rundfunk (NDR), organised the national final Countdown Grand Prix Eurovision 2001 in order to select their entry for the contest. The national final took place on 2 March 2001 and featured twelve competing acts with the winner being selected through two rounds of public televoting. "Wer Liebe lebt" performed by Michelle was selected as the German entry after placing first in the top three during the first round of voting and ultimately gaining 36.6% of the votes in the second round.

As a member of the "Big Four", Germany automatically qualified to compete in the final of the Eurovision Song Contest. Performing in position 19, Germany placed eighth out of the 23 participating countries with 66 points.

== Background ==
Prior to the 2001 Contest, ARD had participated in the Eurovision Song Contest representing Germany forty-four times since its debut in 1956. It has won the contest on one occasion: in 1982 with the song "Ein bißchen Frieden" performed by Nicole. Germany, to this point, has been noted for having appeared in the contest more than any other country; they have competed in every contest since the first edition in 1956 except for 1996 when it was eliminated in a pre-contest elimination round. In 2000, the German entry "Wadde hadde dudde da?" performed by Stefan Raab placed fifth out of twenty-four competing songs scoring 96 points.

As part of its duties as participating broadcaster, ARD organises the selection of its entry in the Eurovision Song Contest and broadcasts the event in the country. Since 1996, ARD had delegated the participation in the contest to its member Norddeutscher Rundfunk (NDR). NDR had set up national finals with several artists to choose both the song and performer to compete at Eurovision for Germany. The broadcaster organised a multi-artist national final in cooperation to select its entry for the 2001 contest.

== Before Eurovision ==
=== Countdown Grand Prix Eurovision 2001 ===
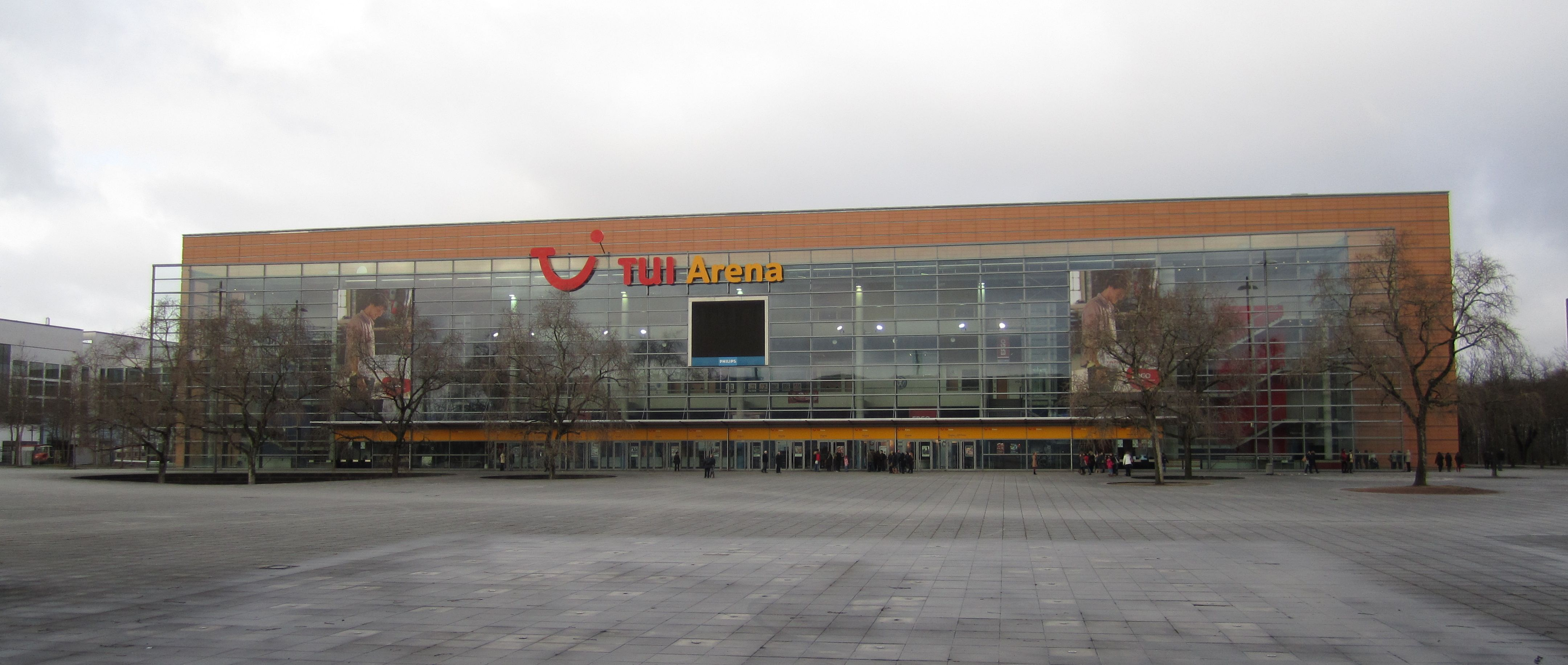
The Preussag Arena in Hanover was the host venue of Countdown Grand Prix Eurovision 2001

Countdown Grand Prix Eurovision 2001 was the competition organised by NDR to select its entry for the Eurovision Song Contest 2001. The competition took place on 2 March 2001 at the Preussag Arena in Hanover, hosted by Axel Bulthaupt and broadcast on Das Erste as well as in Switzerland on SF 2. Twelve acts competed during the show with the winner being selected through a public televote. The national final was watched by 9.23 million viewers in Germany with a market share of 27.4%.

==== Competing entries ====
12 acts were selected by a panel consisting of representatives of the German Phono Academy from proposals received from record companies, while an additional act, Lesley, Joy and Brigitte, was provided by the Swiss-German broadcaster SF DRS which organised an online casting round titled song2001. Joy Fleming had represented Germany in 1975. The thirteen participating acts were announced on 9 January 2001 with one of the entries, "0190" written by Thomas Hubert Kopp and Edgar Fehse and to have been performed by Love Rocket, being disqualified prior to the competition due to NDR rejecting the group's intended stage performance.

Artist	Song	Songwriter(s)
Balloon	"Techno Rocker"	Markus Binapfl, Gordon Delay, Gerd Lehmkuhl, Oliver Goedicke, Oliver Lübbering
German Tenors	"A Song for Our Friends"	Ralph Siegel, Bernd Meinunger
Illegal 2001	"Ich weiß es nicht"	Thomas Lötzsch, Fiete Schlüter, Fred Sonnenschein, Jewns Liebscher, Christian Warkocz
Kevin	"Playing On My Mind"	Lutz Fahrenkrog-Petersen, Mary Susan Applegate
Lesley, Joy and Brigitte	"Power of Trust"	Guido Craveiro, Jason Homan
Lou and Band	"Happy Birthday Party"	Ralph Siegel, Bernd Meinunger
Michelle	"Wer Liebe lebt"	Gino Trovatello, Matthias Stingl, Eva Richter
Münchener Zwietracht feat. Rudolph Moshammer	"Teilt Freud und Leid"	Wolfgang Köbele, Hans Greiner
Soultans	"Set Me Free"	Tony Hendrik, Karin van Haaren
Tagträumer	"Träumen und hoffen"	Mike Pro, Andy Jonas, Susanne Kemmel
Wolf Maahn	"Better Life"	Wolf Maahn
Zlatko	"Einer für alle"	Bob Arnz, Christoph Siemons

==== Final ====
The televised final took place on 2 March 2001. The winner was selected through two rounds of public televoting held in Germany and Switzerland. In the first round of voting, the top three entries were selected to proceed to the second round. In the second round, the winner, "Wer Liebe lebt" performed by Michelle, was selected. In addition to the performances of the competing entries, the interval acts featured the German group Ballhouse, the German singer Millane Fernandez performing her song "Boom Boom", the German duo Modern Talking performing their song "Win the Race" and the German duo Rosenstolz performing their song "Total Eclipse" together with English singer Marc Almond.

First Round – 2 March 2001
R/O	Artist	Song	Televote	Place
1	German Tenors	"A Song for Our Friends"	—	4
2	Münchener Zwietracht feat. Rudolph Moshammer	"Teilt Freud und Leid"	2.3%	10
3	Soultans	"Set Me Free"	—	8
4	Michelle	"Wer Liebe lebt"	22.2%	1
5	Balloon	"Techno Rocker"	2.8%	9
6	Tagträumer	"Träumen und hoffen"	—	7
7	Illegal 2001	"Ich weiß es nicht"	—	5
8	Lesley, Joy and Brigitte	"Power of Trust"	22.1%	2
9	Zlatko	"Einer für alle"	3.7%	6
10	Wolf Maahn	"Better Life"	—	12
11	Kevin	"Playing On My Mind"	—	11
12	Lou and Band	"Happy Birthday Party"	18%	3

Second Round – 2 March 2001
R/O	Artist	Song	Televote	Place
1	Michelle	"Wer Liebe lebt"	36.6%	1
2	Lesley, Joy and Brigitte	"Power of Trust"	34.7%	2
3	Lou and Band	"Happy Birthday Party"	28.7%	3

== At Eurovision ==
The Eurovision Song Contest 2001 took place at Parken Stadium in Copenhagen, Denmark, on 12 May 2001. The relegation rules introduced for the 1997 contest were again utilised ahead of the 2001 contest, based on each country's average points total in previous contests. The 23 participants were made up of the host country, the "Big Four" (France, Germany, Spain and the United Kingdom), and the 12 countries with the highest average scores between the 1996 and 2000 contests competed in the final. As a member of the "Big Four", Germany automatically qualified to compete in the contest. During the allocation draw on 9 November 2001, Germany was drawn to perform in position 19, following the entry from Poland and before the entry from Estonia. Germany finished in eighth place with 66 points.

The contest was broadcast on Das Erste, with commentary by Peter Urban. The show was watched by 8.44 million viewers in Germany, which meant a market share of 36.9 per cent.

=== Voting ===
Below is a breakdown of points awarded to Germany and awarded by Germany in the contest. The nation awarded its 12 points to Denmark in the contest.

NDR appointed Axel Bulthaupt as its spokesperson to announce the top 12-point score awarded by the German televote.

Points awarded to Germany
Score	Country
12 points	
10 points	Portugal; Spain
8 points	Russia
7 points	
6 points	France; Ireland
5 points	Malta
4 points	Denmark; Poland
3 points	Norway; Turkey
2 points	United Kingdom
1 point	Croatia; Estonia; Greece; Latvia; Netherlands

Points awarded by Germany
Score	Country
12 points	Denmark
10 points	Estonia
8 points	Greece
7 points	Turkey
6 points	France
5 points	Poland
4 points	Slovenia
3 points	Croatia
2 points	United Kingdom
1 point	Malta
