= Maian Kärmas =

Estonian singer and journalist

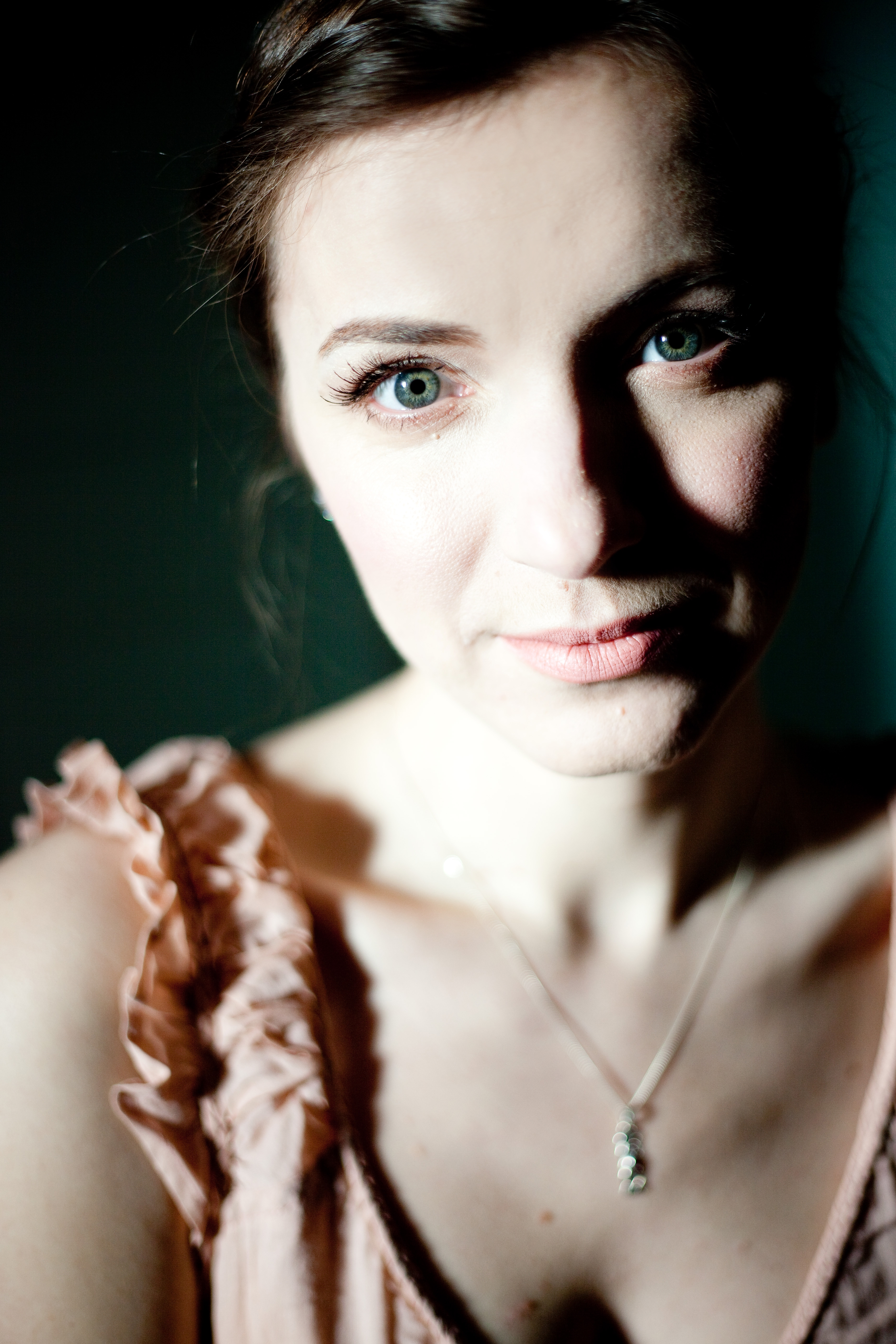
Maian Kärmas in 2011

Maian-Anna Kärmas (born Maian-Anna Kärmas, 25 February 1978 in Tallinn) is an Estonian singer, songwriter, and journalist.

Kärmas had her debut as a soloist in 1995 at Kaks takti ette, a contest for debutant singers, organized by Eesti Televisioon (ETV). She placed 2nd, losing to Tiiu Tulp.

In 1998, Kärmas participated in Eurolaul, the Estonian national final for the Eurovision Song Contest, where she provided backing vocals for "Unistus igavesest päevast", sung by Evelin Samuel. The year after she did the same and also wrote lyrics for "Diamond of Night" that went on to represent Estonia at the Eurovision, held in Jerusalem. Kärmas has been a regular in Eurolaul ever since, for her varied skills either as a songwriter, sololist or backing singer.

In 2001, together with Ivar Must composed "Everybody", performed by Tanel Padar, Dave Benton and 2XL, which won the Eurovision Song Contest 2001 being the first victory of Estonia in the contest. The same year she was cast in the Estonian original production of Les Misérables as factory girl, prostitute, beggar etc.

In 2003 she released her debut solo album Tuigutuled of self-penned material and toured Estonia with concerts. Õnneleid, the second solo album of hers was released in 2010 and Sõnalõimijad, her 3rd studio album in 2014.

Maian Kärmas is also a presenter and editor at the radio programmes of the Estonian National Broadcasting. It was revealed on 10 November 2017 that Kärmas had co-wrote the lyrics for a song that will compete in Eesti Laul 2018, the Estonian national selection for the Eurovision Song Contest 2018, the song being Show A Little Love by Rolf Roosalu.

In 2017, she was involved with the 12th Estonian Youth Song and Dance Celebration, XII noorte laulu- ja tantsupidu, as a script editor and composer/lyricist of the Dance Festival "I WIll Stay".
