= Fly on the Wings of Love =

2000 song by the Olsen Brothers

Single by Olsen Brothers

from the album Wings of Love
- B-side: "Smuk som et stjerneskud"
- Released: 2000
- Genre: Pop rock
- Length: 3:05
- Label: EMI
- Songwriter: Jørgen Olsen
- Producer: Stig Kreutzfeldt

Eurovision Song Contest 2000 entry
- Country: Denmark
- Artists: Jørgen Olsen; Niels Olsen
- As: Olsen Brothers
- Language: English
- Composer: Jørgen Olsen
- Lyricist: Jørgen Olsen

Finals performance
- Final result: 1st
- Final points: 195

Entry chronology
- ◄ "This Time I Mean It" (1999)
- "Never Ever Let You Go" (2001) ►

Official performance video
- "Fly on the Wings of Love" on YouTube

"Fly on the Wings of Love" is a song recorded by Danish pop-rock duo Olsen Brothers (Jørgen and Niels Olsen), with music composed and lyrics written by Jørgen Olsen. It represented Denmark in the Eurovision Song Contest 2000, held in Stockholm, resulting in the country's second win at the contest. The song was an international hit, most notably in Sweden, where it reached number one. The original Danish-language version "Smuk som et stjerneskud" was a number one hit in their native Denmark.

== Background ==
=== Conception ===
"Fly on the Wings of Love" was composed and written by Jørgen Olsen. It is a love ballad, with the singers describing the beauty of a woman. Unusual for any pop song its lyrics strongly imply that this is a beauty which has improved with age, a theme made more explicit in the Danish original "Smuk som et stjerneskud". The Olsen Brothers recorded the song in Danish, English, and German as "Weil nur die Liebe zählt".

=== Eurovision ===
On 19 February 2000, "Smuk som et stjerneskud" performed by the Olsen Brothers competed in the 31st edition of the Dansk Melodi Grand Prix, winning the competition. As the festival was used by the Danish Broadcasting Corporation (DR) to select its song and performer for the 45th edition of the Eurovision Song Contest, the song became the Danish entrant, and the Olsen Brothers the performers, for Eurovision.

On 13 May 2000, the Eurovision Song Contest was held at the Globe Arena in Stockholm hosted by Sveriges Television (SVT), and broadcast live throughout the continent. The Olsen Brothers performed "Fly on the Wings of Love" fourteenth on the evening, following Spain's "Colgado de un sueño" by Serafín Zubiri and preceding Germany's "Wadde hadde dudde da?" by Stefan Raab.

At the close of voting, the song had received 195 points, placing first in a field of twenty-four, winning the contest. The song was not expected to score highly, as it was an old-fashioned ballad and performed by two of the oldest performers to enter the contest. In spite of this, it led the voting from start to finish, a feat not achieved since ABBA won in 1974. It became a great favourite among fans of the contest. The song is memorable for the vocoding effects given to the voice during the final chorus, which allow it to sound something like a robot. These effects were the subject of a protest by the Russian delegation, however they were not found to be against the rules and the result stood.

The song was succeeded in the 2001 contest as winner by "Everybody" by Tanel Padar and Dave Benton representing Estonia. It was succeeded as Danish representative in 2001 by "Never Ever Let You Go" by Rollo & King.

=== Aftermath ===
"Fly on the Wings of Love" was one of fourteen songs chosen by Eurovision fans and a European Broadcasting Union (EBU) reference group, from among the 992 songs that had ever participated in the contest, to participate in the fiftieth anniversary competition Congratulations: 50 Years of the Eurovision Song Contest held on 22 October 2005 in Copenhagen. The brothers in fact performed part of the song onstage and were greeted with rapturous applause –perhaps due to the special's location–. Renārs Kaupers, hosting the show, made several references to "being beaten by a pair of Danish brothers" –which his band Brainstorm was–.

On 6 March 2010, the Olsen Brothers performed the song at the Romanian national final for Eurovision. On 31 March 2015, they performed it in the Eurovision sixtieth anniversary show Eurovision Song Contest's Greatest Hits held in London.

On 13 May 2025, the 25th anniversary of their Eurovision win, Jørgen Olsen performed a rewritten version of the song titled "United by Music" at the end of the first semi-final of the Eurovision Song Contest 2025 in Basel.

== Charts ==
=== Weekly charts ===
Chart (2000)	Peak position
Austria (Ö3 Austria Top 40)	11
Belgium (Ultratop 50 Flanders)	16
Denmark (IFPI) "Smuk som et stjerneskud"	1
Europe (Eurochart Hot 100)	23
Germany (GfK)	7
Netherlands (Single Top 100)	45
Norway (VG-lista)	5
Sweden (Sverigetopplistan)	1
Switzerland (Schweizer Hitparade)	17
UK Singles (OCC)	160

=== Year-end charts ===
Chart (2000)	Position
Denmark (IFPI)	5
Germany (Media Control)	51
Sweden (Hitlistan)	10

== Certifications ==
Region	Certification	Certified units/sales
Sweden (GLF)	Platinum	30,000^{^}
^{^} Shipments figures based on certification alone.

== Cover versions ==
=== XTM and DJ Chucky version ===
"Fly on the Wings of Love"
- 2003 UK and European CD artwork

Single by XTM and DJ Chucky presents Annia
- Released: 2000
- Genre: Eurotrance
- Length: 3:24 (original 12-inch mix); 2:59 (radio mix)
- Label: Cyber Music
- Songwriter: Jørgen Olsen
- Producers: DJ Richard and Johnny Bass

XTM singles chronology
"Fly on the Wings of Love" (2000)	"Give Me Your Love" (2005)

In 2000, Spanish dance act XTM recorded and released a version of the song featuring DJ Chucky and vocals from Annia. It became a hit between 2000 and 2003, peaking at number two in Spain, number one in Ireland, and number eight in the United Kingdom.

==== Chart performance ====
Upon its release in Spain, the song reached number two on the AFYVE chart on 20 January 2001. It stayed in the top 20 for nine weeks.

Two years after its original release, on 26 May 2003, the cover was released in the United Kingdom. It debuted at number nine on the UK Singles Chart on the week beginning 1 June, then reached its peak of number eight the next week. Over the next ten weeks, the song fluctuated around the top 20, eventually spending two more weeks at number eight before dropping out of the top 20 on 24 August and the top 100 on 12 October. Due to its longevity on the UK chart, "Fly on the Wings of Love" finished 2003 as the country's 32nd best-selling single, outselling every song that peaked at numbers four to seven. It eventually received a Silver certification from the British Phonographic Industry (BPI) in 2016 for sales and streams of over 200,000.

The song was also highly successful on the Scottish Singles Chart, where it entered and spent four weeks at its peak of number three. It spent 12 weeks in the top 10, 16 in the top 40, and 20 in the top 100. In Ireland, the single reached number one for two weeks in August 2003, spent 24 weeks in the top 50, and ended 2003 as Ireland's 11th highest-selling single. The cover found moderate success in the Netherlands, climbing to number 31 in February 2004 and logging 19 weeks on the Single Top 100 chart.

==== Track listings ====
- Spanish 12-inch single

A1. "Fly on the Wings of Love" (DJ Richard & Johnny Bass De La Cruz remix) – 5:49
A2. "Fly on the Wings of Love" (Colossos mix) – 4:38
B1. "Fly on the Wings of Love" (XTM remix I) – 5:58
B2. "Fly on the Wings of Love" (XTM remix II) – 6:08

- Spanish maxi-CD single
1. "Fly on the Wings of Love" (DJ Richard & Johnny Bass de la Cruz radio remix) – 3:33
2. "Fly on the Wings of Love" (DJ Richard & Johnny Bass de la Cruz remix) – 5:49
3. "Fly on the Wings of Love" (XTM radio remix I) – 3:47
4. "Fly on the Wings of Love" (XTM remix I) – 5:58
5. "Fly on the Wings of Love" (XTM radio remix II) – 4:00
6. "Fly on the Wings of Love" (XTM remix II) – 6:08
7. "Fly on the Wings of Love" (Colossos radio edit) – 3:24
8. "Fly on the Wings of Love" (Colossos mix) – 4:38
- UK 12-inch single

A1. "Fly on the Wings of Love" (original 12-inch version)
AA1. "Fly on the Wings of Love" (Flip & Fill remix)

- UK and European CD single
1. "Fly on the Wings of Love" (radio mix)
2. "Fly on the Wings of Love" (Flip & Fill remix)
3. "Fly on the Wings of Love" (original 12-inch version)
4. "Fly on the Wings of Love" (video)
- Dutch CD single
1. "Fly on the Wings of Love" (radio edit) – 3:15
2. "Fly on the Wings of Love" (XTM radio edit) – 3:47
3. "Fly on the Wings of Love" (video clip) – 3:00

==== Charts ====
===== Weekly charts =====
Chart (2001–2004)	Peak position
Ireland (IRMA)	1
Ireland Dance (IRMA)	1
Netherlands (Single Top 100)	31
Scotland Singles (Official Charts)	3
Spain (Promusicae)	2
UK Singles (Official Charts)	8
UK Dance (Official Charts)	6

===== Year-end charts =====
Chart (2003)	Position
Ireland (IRMA)	11
UK Singles (OCC)	32

==== Certifications ====
Region	Certification	Certified units/sales
United Kingdom (BPI)	Silver	200,000^{‡}
^{‡} Sales+streaming figures based on certification alone.

=== Other cover versions ===
- In 2000, Danish producer Holger Lagerfeldt released a cover version under the name DJ Cookie with vocals by Linda Andrews.
- In 2002, German trance group Topmodelz consisting of Pulsedriver and SveN-R-G vs. Bass-T released a cover version on Aqualoop Records.

Preceded by "Take Me to Your Heaven" by Charlotte Nilsson	Eurovision Song Contest winners 2000	Succeeded by "Everybody" by Tanel Padar and Dave Benton with 2XL
