= Maschen-Draht-Zaun =

1999 single by Stefan Raab

Single by Stefan Raab

from the album TV total – das Album
- Released: 1999
- Length: 3:24
- Label: Rare
- Songwriters: Stefan Raab; Jens Bujar
- Producer: Stefan Raab

Stefan Raab singles chronology
"Schlimmer Finger" (1998)	"Maschen-Draht-Zaun" (1999)	"Wadde hadde dudde da?" (2000)

Audio
- "Maschen-Draht-Zaun" on YouTube

"Maschen-Draht-Zaun" ("chain-link fence") is a country music song by German entertainer Stefan Raab, released in 1999. The inspiration for the song comes from his TV show TV total, where short (often involuntarily) humorous clips from other German TV shows are shown.

== Background ==
For this song the law court show Richterin Barbara Salesch (Judge Barbara Salesch) was shown, where the plaintiff, Regina Zindler, accused her neighbour because a snowberry bush (Knallerbsenstrauch) was growing into her chain-link fence, hence damaging it. The 51-year-old Zindler spoke with a strong Vogtlander accent, and tried to make her speech more credible by using legalese to accentuate important passages; however, the coloring of her dialect and her insistence to always specifically describe her fence as a wiremesh fence and the neighbours bush as a common snowberry bush added to the hilarity.

Because of the rhythmic accentuation of the "Maschendrahtzaun" it seemed suitable for the inclusion into a song. The two main points of the song's hilarity are the sheer banality of the lawsuit and the plaintiff's thick regional accent, which is routinely ridiculed in German comedy. The two buzzwords "Maschendrahtzaun" and "Knallerbsenstrauch" expose the main phonetic distinctions of the Upper Saxon dialect very heavily.

The song tells the story of a lonesome cowboy and/or sheriff in English (with a few German words), with the audio sample of the woman saying "Maschendrahtzaun" and "Knallerbsenstrauch" (common snowberry shrub / lit. bang snaps shrub) inserted into the song. The music video extends this with using footage from the TV show. The song talks about the cowboy (in the first person) and things he does with a wire-mesh fence. There is no obvious link between the song and the legal case, however both stories indicate unusual misuse of such a fence. The song's story is a little lewd in some places and contains some strong language, even in the radio edit version.

The CD sold approximately 800,000 times; Raab gave DM 0.10 Deutsche Mark per sold CD to Zindler as royalties. It reached number one in Germany.

== Aftermath ==
German TV broadcasters Sat.1 and RTL Television took interest in Zindler; while Sat.1 broadcast from her house, it received major fan attraction and her fence got vandalized. RTL took over during the time, as Sat.1 already began closing the story about Zindler.

RTL wanted to feature her as a musician, making a new song "Friede am Zaun" ("peace at the fence") featuring her with a girl band Die drei Knallerbsen, produced by Bernd Schumacher and Leipzig-based production firm 99pro. Radio stations boycotted the song, so the campaign never took off.

In order to escape the media attention, Zindler eventually sold her house and moved to Berlin. She died of cancer on 5 May 2026, aged 78.

== Track listing ==
German CD single

1. "Maschen-Draht-Zaun" (radio edit) – 3:24
2. "Maschen-Draht-Zaun" (extended X-rated version) – 5:12
3. "Maschen-Draht-Zaun" (sing-a-long version) – 3:24
4. "Maschen-Draht-Zaun" (Early 60's Full Stereo Mix) – 5:13

== Chart ==
=== Weekly charts ===
Chart (1999–2000)	Peak position
Austria (Ö3 Austria Top 40)	1
Germany (GfK)	1
Switzerland (Schweizer Hitparade)	2

=== Year-end charts ===
Chart (1999)	Position
Germany (Official German Charts)	45
Chart (2000)	Position
Austria (Ö3 Austria Top 40)	13
Germany (Official German Charts)	27
Switzerland (Schweizer Hitparade)	39
