= XTM =

XTM may refer to:

- XML Topic Maps (IT)
- X-Ray Tomographic Methods (Medicine), imaging by sections
- XTM (band), Catalan dance music band consisting of brothers Xasqui and Toni Ten
- XTM (TV Channel), South Korean TV channel
