= Info 24 =

- Country: Serbia
- Headquarters: Belgrade, Serbia

Programming
- Language: Serbian language

Ownership
- Owner: Rom Press

History
- Launched: 6 February 2000

Info 24 is a television station in Serbia.

The channel was founded as Yu info on 16 February 2000 by the Government of the Federal Republic of Yugoslavia. It was founded as a propaganda channel, specifically targeting the Montenegrin market.

The channel was accused of stealing the Eurovision network signal from the Radio Television of Serbia. The channel also broadcast the 2001 Eurovision Song Contest.

After the fall of Milošević, the station failed to repay its debts. By the end of 2002, it stopped broadcasting in Montenegro and Vojvodina. By 2003, the channel changed its name to Info 24. In 2006, the channel was sold to Dienter for €75,600.
