= Autoball =

Team sport played with cars and spherical balls

Autoball (Portuguese: autobol) is a variant of association football where two or more drivers in cars compete against each other with the aim of scoring more goals than the opponent.

== History ==
In 1933, autoball was founded by German racing driver Karl Kappler. In the 1970s, autoball was popular in Brazil but was banned due to the 1973 oil crisis.

German television host Stefan Raab founded television show TV total Autoball.

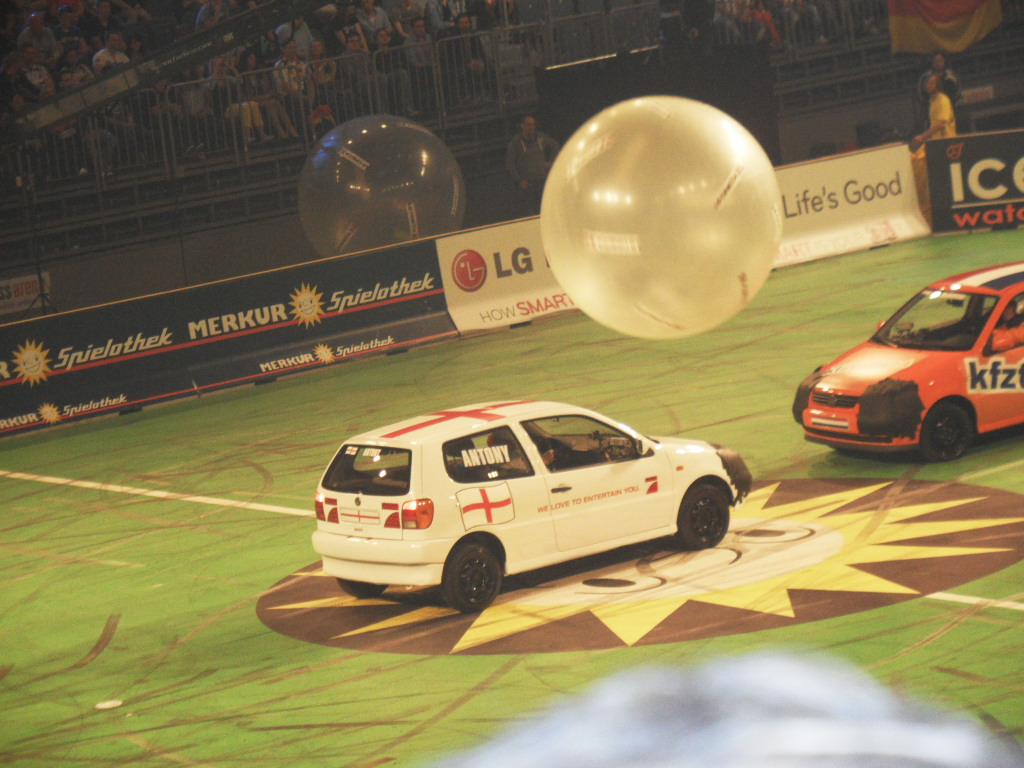
A photo taken at TV total Autoball Europameisterschaft 2012

== Autoball (TV total) ==
After Autoball was played on Schlag den Raab, TV total organized six Autoball European and World Championships. The championships were held in connection with the European Football Championship or FIFA World Cup held in the same year and were broadcast live as several-hour television events.

Eight countries took part in each championship. The participants were not professional motorsport drivers. Instead, each country was represented by a celebrity driver from that country, with varying levels of driving ability. The competition began with a preliminary round divided into two groups of four. The top two players from each group advanced to the semifinals. The two semifinal winners then competed against each other in the final.

== See also ==
- Rocket League
