= Wadde hadde dudde da? =

2000 single by Stefan Raab

Single by Stefan Raab
- Language: German, English
- Released: 2000
- Songwriter: Stefan Raab

Eurovision Song Contest 2000 entry
- Country: Germany
- Artist: Stefan Raab
- Languages: German, English
- Composer: Stefan Raab
- Lyricist: Stefan Raab

Finals performance
- Final result: 5th
- Final points: 96

Entry chronology
- ◄ "Reise nach Jerusalem - Kudüs'e seyahat" (1999)
- "Wer Liebe lebt" (2001) ►

"Wadde hadde dudde da?" (German pronunciation: [ˈvadə ˌhadə ˌdʊdə ˈdaː]; a derivative of the expression was hast du da? "what do you have there?") is a song written and performed by Stefan Raab. It represented Germany in the Eurovision Song Contest 2000. The song was the fifteenth performed on the night, following Denmark's Olsen Brothers with "Fly on the Wings of Love" and preceding Switzerland's Jane Bogaert with "La vita cos'è?". At the close of voting, it had received 96 points, placing fifth in a field of 24.

The idea of the song could have come from Raab's show TV total, where a short snippet from another TV-show shows a woman with her dog, which carries something in its mouth to her. In a childish cutesy dialect she asks the dog what he has there (in its mouth), hence the "Wadde hadde dudde da?".

Raab had previously written and composed Guildo Horn's "Guildo hat euch lieb!" for the 1998 contest, and "Wadde hadde dudde da?" is in a similar vein. The song opens with a monologue delivered in English and German in which Raab is described as "the sensational super sack of German television". Another voice explains in German that Raab had gone to America and promised, "if I make it there / I'm never coming back to Germany again".

Raab's appearance consists of a rapid-fire hip-hop-inspired delivery of tongue twisters in an invented German dialect on the general theme of questions about what "he has there". After the opening lines, a female vocalists asks in broken English "I am so curious, I just wanna know what you there have" (a reference to German word order). It is never revealed what Raab has there, but the final line "oh my God", implies that it is something surprising or obscene.

The performance at the Contest was flamboyant, with Raab and his guitarists dressed in cowboy hats, and the six-person ensemble all wearing bright yellow clothing. An excerpt of the performance appeared in a montage of "Unforgettable Performances" at the Congratulations special in late 2005.

It was succeeded as German representative at the 2001 contest by Michelle with "Wer Liebe lebt".

== Charts ==
=== Weekly charts ===
Chart (2000)	Peak position
Austria (Ö3 Austria Top 40)	34
Germany (GfK)	2
Switzerland (Schweizer Hitparade)	33

=== Year-end charts ===
Chart (2000)	Position
Germany (Media Control)	77

Preceded by "Reise nach Jerusalem – Kudüs'e seyahat" by Sürpriz	Germany in the Eurovision Song Contest; 2000	Succeeded by "Wer Liebe lebt" by Michelle
