= Ivar Must =

Estonian composer and music producer (born 1961)

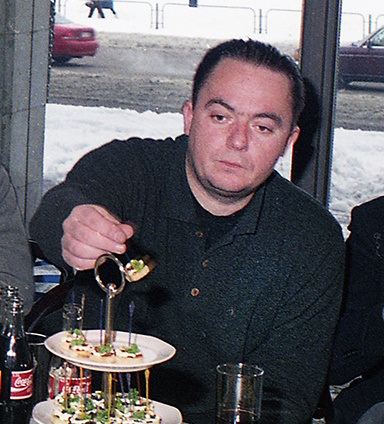
Must in 1996

Ivar Must (born 7 May 1961 in Tallinn as Igor Tsõganov) is an Estonian composer and music producer. He composed "Everybody", which won the Eurovision Song Contest 2001.

== Eurovision Song Contest entries ==
- "Nagu Merelaine" by Silvi Vrait, Estonia, (Eurovision Song Contest 1994), 24th place
- "Everybody" by Tanel Padar and Dave Benton, Estonia, (Eurovision Song Contest 2001), 1st place

Preceded by Jørgen Olsen	Eurovision Song Contest winning composers 2001	Succeeded by Marie N
