= Poland in the Eurovision Song Contest 2001 =

- Eurovision Song Contest 2001
- Participating broadcaster: Telewizja Polska (TVP)
- Country: Poland
- Selection process: Internal selection
- Announcement date: 2 March 2001

Competing entry
- Song: "2 Long"
- Artist: Piasek
- Songwriters: Robert Chojnacki; Andrzej Piaseczny; John Porter

Placement
- Final result: 20th, 11 points

Participation chronology

Poland was represented at the Eurovision Song Contest 2001 with the song "2 Long", composed by Robert Chojnacki, with lyrics by John Porter, and performed by Piasek. The Polish participating broadcaster, Telewizja Polska (TVP), internally selected its entry for the contest. TVP returned to the contest after an enforced one-year absence as one of the seven lowest-ranked entrants in the 1999 contest. The broadcaster announced the song "Z kimś takim" performed by Piasek as its entry on 2 March 2001. The song was later translated for Eurovision from the original Polish-language lyrics written by Piasek himself to new English-language lyrics by John Porter and it was titled "2 Long".

Poland competed in the Eurovision Song Contest which took place on 12 May 2001. Performing during the show in position 18, Poland placed twentieth out of the 23 participating countries, scoring 11 points.

== Background ==
Prior to the 2001 Contest, Telewizja Polska (TVP) had participated in the Eurovision Song Contest representing Poland six times since its first entry in 1994. Its highest placement in the contest, to this point, has been second place, achieved with its debut entry in 1994 with the song "To nie ja!" performed by Edyta Górniak.

As part of its duties as participating broadcaster, TVP organises the selection of its entry in the Eurovision Song Contest and broadcasts the event in the country. Having internally selected their entries since 1994, the broadcaster opted to continue selecting its entry via an internal selection for 2001.

== Before Eurovision ==
=== Internal selection ===
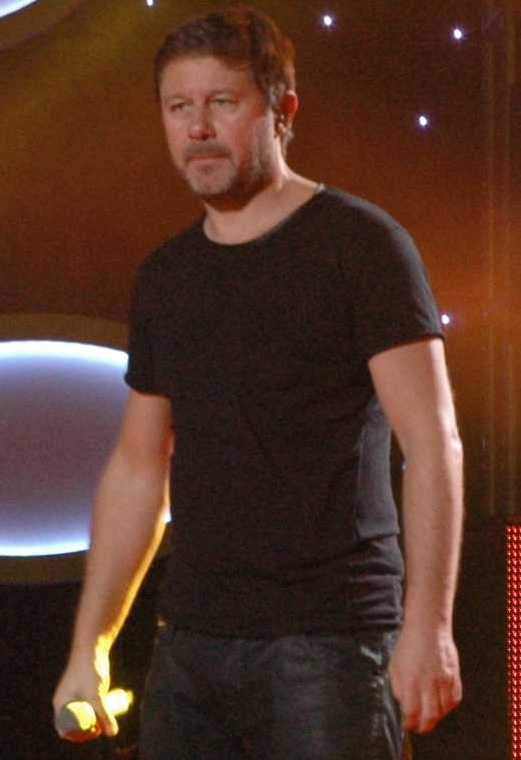
Piasek was internally selected to represent Poland in 2001

The Polish entry for the Eurovision Song Contest 2001 was selected via an internal selection headed by the TVP Head of Entertainment Marek Sierocki, who directly invited several songwriters to submit songs. On 2 March 2001, TVP announced that Piasek would represent Poland in the 2001 contest with the song "Z kimś takim", composed by Robert Chojnacki and with lyrics by Piasek himself. On 28 March 2001, TVP announced that Piasek would perform the English language version of "Z kimś takim" at the Eurovision Song Contest. The new version, titled "2 Long" with English lyrics by John Porter, was released on 23 April 2001. "2 Long" was the first song performed entirely in the English language that was selected to represent Poland at the Eurovision Song Contest.

TVP had initially selected a song composed by Romuald Lipko and with lyrics by Andrzej Mogielnicki. Singers Kayah and Natalia Kukulska were approached as potential performers, however, both rejected the proposal, with Kukulska citing artistic incompatibilities with the song lyrics. Piasek was then approached, which he accepted but on the condition that he could write a new set of lyrics himself. The song was ultimately withdrawn due to disagreements with Mogielnicki, and TVP invited Robert Chojnacki to compose a new song together with Piasek. The song "Powiedz" performed by the band Ich Troje was also considered by TVP prior to the entry selection.

== At Eurovision ==
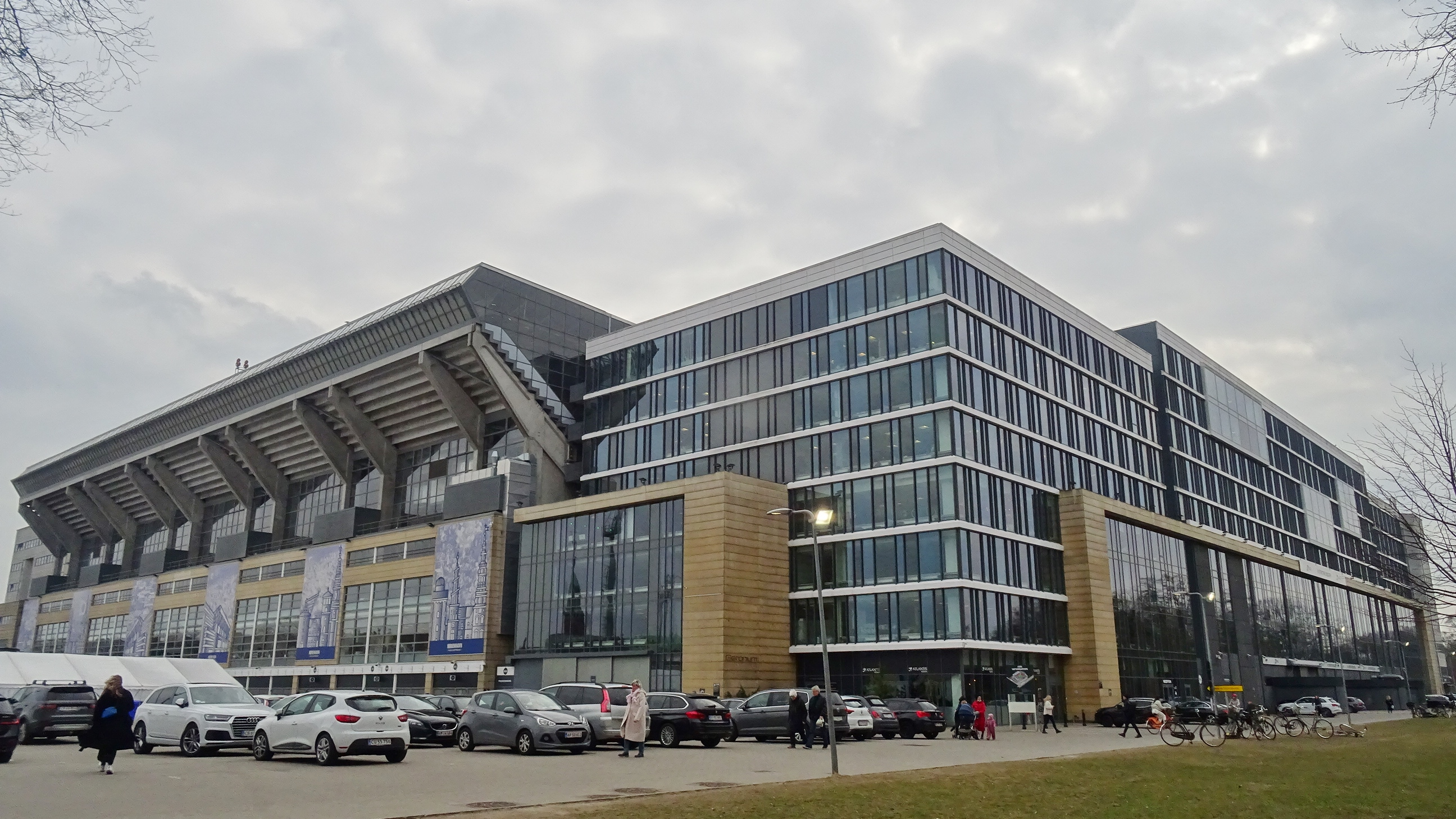
The Eurovision Song Contest 2001 took place at Parken Stadium in Copenhagen, Denmark.

The Eurovision Song Contest 2001 took place at Parken Stadium in Copenhagen, Denmark, on 12 May 2001. The relegation rules introduced for the 1997 contest were again utilised ahead of the 2001 contest, based on each country's average points total in previous contests. The 23 participants were made up of the previous year's winning country, the "Big Four" countries, consisting of France, Germany, Spain and the United Kingdom, the twelve countries which had obtained the highest average points total over the preceding five contests, and any eligible countries which did not compete in the 2000 contest. On 21 November 2000, an allocation draw was held which determined the running order, and Poland was set to perform in position 18, following the entry from Slovenia and before the entry from Germany.

The contest was broadcast on TVP1, with commentary by Artur Orzech.

Piasek took part in rehearsals for their performance during the week of 7–12 May 2001, which concluded with the final dress rehearsal on 12 May where the professional juries of each country watched and voted on the competing entries. Three backing vocalists: Beata Bednarz, Patrycja Gola and Katarzyna Pysiak, joined Piasek on stage and Poland finished in twentieth place with 11 points. The performance prompted Poland to receive the awarded the Barbara Dex Award, a humorous fan award given to the worst dressed artist each year as voted by the fansite House of Eurovision, after Piasek performed in a tatty fur jacket during the first verse of the song, which was non-apparent from the lyrical content of the song.

=== Voting ===
Voting during the show involved each country awarding points from 1–8, 10 and 12 as determined by either 100% televoting or a combination of 50% televoting and 50% national jury. In cases where televoting was not possible, only the votes of the eight-member national juries were tabulated. Poland received 11 points, with its highest award of 5 points coming from Germany. TVP appointed Maciej Orłoś as its spokesperson to announce the results of the Polish televote during the show. The tables below visualise a complete breakdown of the points awarded to and awarded by Poland in the Eurovision Song Contest 2001.

Points awarded to Poland
Score	Country
12 points	
10 points	
8 points	
7 points	
6 points	
5 points	Germany
4 points	
3 points	Slovenia
2 points	Sweden
1 point	Denmark

Points awarded by Poland
Score	Country
12 points	Estonia
10 points	France
8 points	Greece
7 points	Denmark
6 points	Slovenia
5 points	Sweden
4 points	Germany
3 points	Malta
2 points	United Kingdom
1 point	Spain
