= Eurovision Song Contest 2001 =

International song competition

Coordinates: 55°42′08.89″N 12°34′19.93″E

Date and venue
- Final: 12 May 2001
- Venue: Parken Stadium; Copenhagen, Denmark

Organisation
- Organiser: European Broadcasting Union (EBU)
- Scrutineer: Christine Marchal-Ortiz

Production
- Host broadcaster: Danish Broadcasting Corporation (DR)
- Director: Jan Frifelt
- Executive producer: Jørgen Ramskov
- Presenters: Natasja Crone Back; Søren Pilmark

Participants
- Number of entries: 23
- Returning countries: Bosnia and Herzegovina; Greece; Lithuania; Poland; Portugal; Slovenia
- Non-returning countries: Austria; Belgium; Cyprus; Finland; Macedonia; Romania; Switzerland
- Participation map: Competing countries Relegated countries unable to participate due to poor results in previous contests Countries that participated in the past but not in 2001

Vote
- Voting system: Each country awarded 12, 10, 8-1 points to their 10 favourite songs.
- Winning song: Estonia "Everybody"

The Eurovision Song Contest 2001 was the 46th edition of the Eurovision Song Contest, held on 12 May 2001 at the Parken Stadium in Copenhagen, Denmark, and presented by Natasja Crone Back and Søren Pilmark. It was organised by the European Broadcasting Union (EBU) and host broadcaster the Danish Broadcasting Corporation (DR), who staged the event after winning the 2000 contest for Denmark with the song "Fly on the Wings of Love" by Olsen Brothers.

Broadcasters from twenty-three countries took part in the contest. Bosnia and Herzegovina, Lithuania, Poland, Portugal, and Slovenia returned after their relegation from the previous edition. Greece also returned after their two-year absence, following a relegation and financial trouble. Meanwhile, Austria, Belgium, Cyprus, Finland, Macedonia, Romania, and Switzerland were relegated.

The winner was Estonia with the song "Everybody", performed by Tanel Padar, Dave Benton and 2XL, and written by Ivar Must and Maian-Anna Kärmas. This was the first time the contest was won by one of the countries from the former Eastern bloc that debuted in the contest in the 1990s. Denmark, Greece, France, and Sweden rounded out the top five with Greece achieving its best result up to that point in the contest. Further down the table, Slovenia equalled their best result from 1995, finishing seventh. Meanwhile, Ireland finished in 21st place, giving the nation its worst placement up to that point.

== Location ==
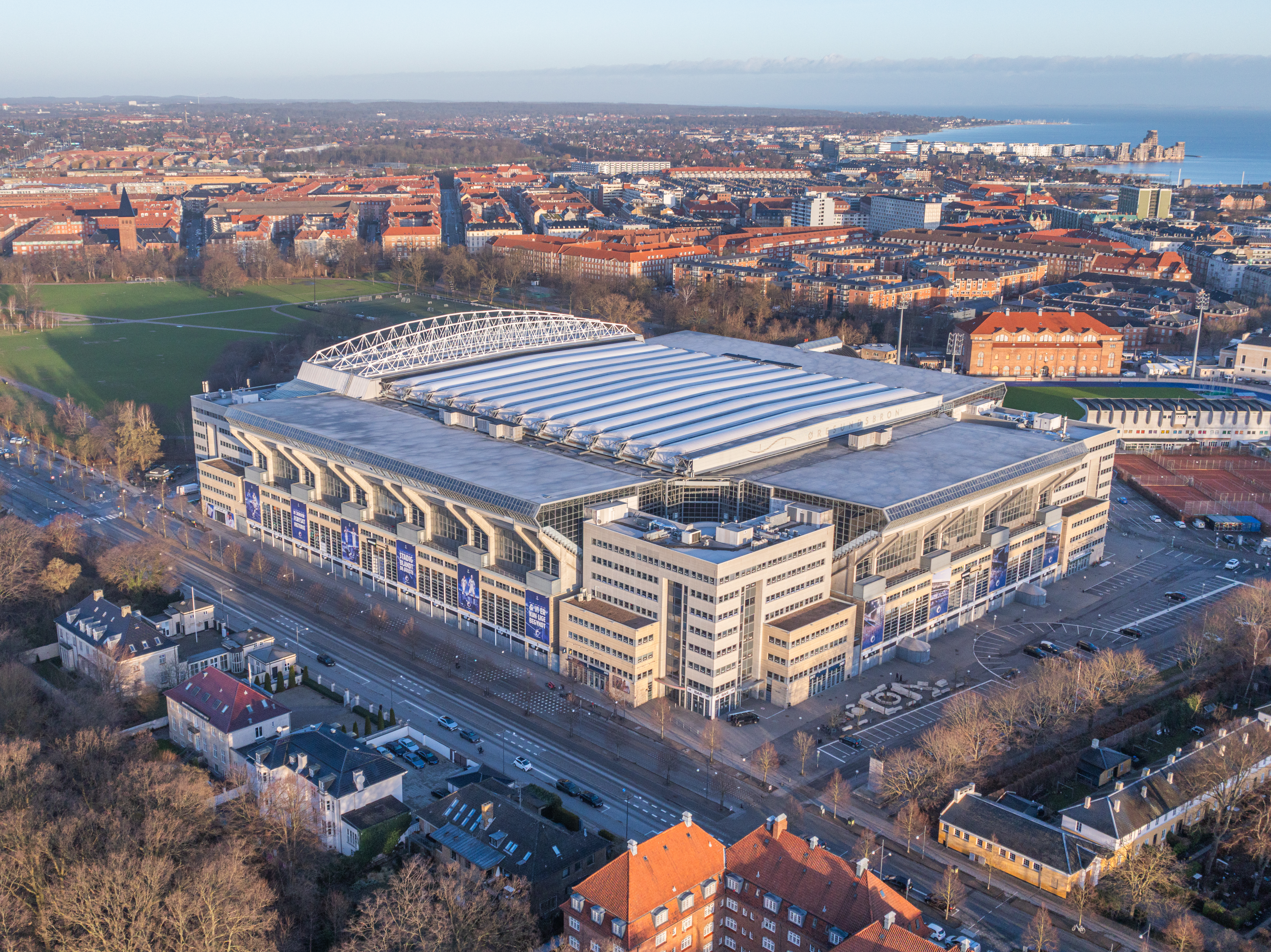
Parken Stadium, Copenhagen - host venue of the 2001 contest.

Locations of the candidate cities: the chosen host city is marked in blue, while the eliminated cities are marked in red.

Copenhagen, the capital of Denmark, was the chosen host city. The venue choice for the contest was Parken Stadium, the national football stadium, located in the Indre Østerbro district of Copenhagen, built from 1990 to 1992.

The Danish Broadcasting Corporation (DR) faced some problems whilst organising the contest such as a lack of funds and the search for a suitable venue. The three largest cities in Denmark – Copenhagen, Aarhus, and Odense – all made bids to host the contest. Eventually, DR chose the large football stadium Parken as the host venue, after the company running the stadium agreed to add a retractable roof to the building. This solution made it the biggest venue ever to host a Eurovision Song Contest with room for an audience of 38,000, breaking the record of 16,000 held by the previous year's hosts Sweden. However, the venue's scale meant that many audience members could not see the stage, and for many entries the hall appeared to be too big.

== Participants ==
Eurovision Song Contest 2001 – Participation summaries by country
- Bosnia and Herzegovina; Croatia; Denmark; Estonia; France; Germany; Greece; Iceland; Ireland; Israel; Latvia; Lithuania; Malta; Netherlands; Norway; Poland; Portugal; Russia; Slovenia; Spain; Sweden; Turkey; United Kingdom

Per the rules of the contest twenty-three countries were allowed to participate in the event. Bosnia and Herzegovina, Greece, Lithuania, Poland, Portugal, and Slovenia returned after being relegated from the previous year's event. 2000 participants Austria, Belgium, Cyprus, Finland, Macedonia, Romania, and Switzerland were absent from this edition.

Tanel Padar, representing Estonia with Dave Benton and 2XL, had provided backing vocals for Estonia in 2000.

Eurovision Song Contest 2001 participants
Country	Broadcaster	Artist	Song	Language	Songwriter(s)
Bosnia and Herzegovina	PBSBiH	Nino	"Hano"	Bosnian, English	Nino Pršeš
Croatia	HRT	Vanna	"Strings of My Heart"	English	Tonči Huljić; Vjekoslava Huljić
Denmark	DR	Rollo & King	"Never Ever Let You Go"	English	Stefan Nielsen; Søren Poppe
Estonia	ETV	Tanel Padar, Dave Benton and 2XL	"Everybody"	English	Maian-Anna Kärmas; Ivar Must
France	France Télévisions	Natasha St-Pier	"Je n'ai que mon âme"	French, English	Jill Kapler
Germany	NDR (Note: On behalf of the German public broadcasting consortium ARD)	Michelle	"Wer Liebe lebt"	German, English	Eva Richter; Matthias Stingl; Gino Trovatello
Greece	ERT	Antique	"Die for You"	Greek, English	Antonis Pappas; Nikos Terzis
Iceland	RÚV	Two Tricky	"Angel"	English	Einar Bárðarson; Magnús Þór Sigmundsson
Ireland	RTÉ	Gary O'Shaughnessy	"Without Your Love"	English	Pat Sheridan
Israel	IBA	Tal Sondak	"Ein Davar" (אין דבר)	Hebrew	Yair Klinger; Shimrit Orr
Latvia	LTV	Arnis Mednis	"Too Much"	English	Arnis Mednis; Gustavs Terzens
Lithuania	LRT	Skamp	"You Got Style"	English, Lithuanian	Vilius Alesius; Viktoras Diawara; Erica Jennings
Malta	PBS	Fabrizio Faniello	"Another Summer Night"	English	Georgina Abela; Paul Abela
Netherlands	NOS	Michelle	"Out on My Own"	English	André Remkes; Dirk Jan Vermeij
Norway	NRK	Haldor Lægreid	"On My Own"	English	Ole Henrik Antonsen; Tom-Steinar Hanssen; Ole Jørgen Olsen
Poland	TVP	Piasek	"2 Long"	English	Robert Chojnacki; Andrzej Piaseczny
Portugal	RTP	MTM	"Só sei ser feliz assim"	Portuguese	Marco Quelhas
Russia	ORT	Mumiy Troll	"Lady Alpine Blue"	English	Ilya Lagutenko
Slovenia	RTVSLO	Nuša Derenda	"Energy"	English	Lucienne Lončina; Matjaž Vlašič
Spain	TVE	David Civera	"Dile que la quiero"	Spanish	Alejandro Abad
Sweden	SVT	Friends	"Listen to Your Heartbeat"	English	Thomas G:son; Henrik Sethsson
Turkey	TRT	Sedat Yüce	"Sevgiliye Son"	Turkish, English	Figen Çakmak; Nurdan Güneri; Semih Güneri
United Kingdom	BBC	Lindsay Dracass	"No Dream Impossible"	English	Russ Ballard; Chris Winter

=== Qualification ===
Due to the high number of countries wishing to enter the contest, a relegation system was introduced in 1993 in order to reduce the number of countries which could compete in each year's contest. Any relegated countries would be able to return the following year, thus allowing all countries the opportunity to compete in at least one in every two editions. The relegation rules introduced for the 1997 contest were again utilised ahead of the 2001 contest, based on each country's average points total in previous contests. The twenty-three participants were made up of the previous year's winning country, "Big Four" countries, the twelve countries which had obtained the highest average points total over the preceding five contests, and any eligible countries which did not compete in the 2000 contest. In cases where the average was identical between two or more countries the total number of points scored in the most recent contest determined the final order.

Bosnia and Herzegovina, Greece, Lithuania, Poland, Portugal, and Slovenia returned after being excluded from participating in the 2000 contest, while Austria, Belgium, Cyprus, Finland, Macedonia, Romania, Switzerland, the seven countries with the lowest average result in the past five contests, were relegated.

The calculations used to determine the countries relegated for the 2001 contest are outlined in the table below.

Table key

Qualifier
‡ Automatic qualifier
† Returning countries which did not compete in 2000

Calculation of average points to determine qualification for the 2001 contest (Note: Determined by totalling all points awarded in the past five contests and dividing by the number of times that country had participated.)
Rank	Country	Average	Yearly Point Totals				
Rank	Country	Average	1996	1997	1998	1999	2000
1	Latvia	136.00					136
2	United Kingdom ‡	107.20	77	227	166	38	28
3	Ireland	98.60	162	157	64	18	92
4	Denmark ‡	97.00	DNQ	25	R	71	195
5	Russia	94.00	DNQ	33	R		155
6	Israel	90.67	DNQ		172	93	7
7	Sweden	88.00	100	36	53	163	88
8	Germany ‡	86.00	DNQ	22	86	140	96
9	Malta	80.80	68	66	165	32	73
10	Croatia	80.40	98	24	131	79 (Note: Croatia's score from the 1999 contest was reduced by 33% for the purposes of determining average scores due to the use of synthesised pre-recorded vocals in that year's Croatian entry.)	70
11	Estonia	80.00	94	82	36	90	98
12	Netherlands	68.80	78	5	150	71	40
13	Iceland	65.00	51	18	R	146	45
14	Norway	57.00	114	0	79	35	57
15	Turkey	56.60	57	121	25	21	59
16	Belgium	46.00	22	R	122	38	2
17	Austria	44.75	68	12	R	65	34
18	Cyprus	43.40	72	98	37	2	8
19	Bosnia and Herzegovina †	40.33	13	22	R	86	R
20	Slovenia †	35.75	16	60	17	50	R
21	Portugal †	35.00	92	0	36	12	R
22	Spain ‡	30.60	17	96	21	1	18
23	Poland †	30.25	31	54	19	17	R
24	Greece †	29.00	36	39	12	R	
25	France ‡	27.00	18	95	3	14	5
26	Macedonia	22.50	DNQ	R	16	R	29
27	Finland	16.33	9	R	22	R	18
28	Romania	15.50	DNQ	R	6	R	25
29	Lithuania †	13.00		R		13	R
30	Switzerland	10.25	22	5	0	R	14

== Production ==
The Eurovision Song Contest 2001 was produced by the Danish public broadcaster the Danish Broadcasting Corporation (DR). Jørgen Ramskov served as executive producer, Jan Frifelt served as director and Christine Marchal-Ortiz served as EBU scrutineer. Television presenter Natasja Crone Back and actor Søren Pilmark were the presenters of the 2001 contest.

Rehearsals in the venue for the competing acts were held from 7 to 12 May 2001. Four technical rehearsals from 7 to 10 May and two dress rehearsals on 11 and 12 May were held in a lead up to the contest.

The logo for this year's contest was developed by Danish companies Kontrapunkt, 2Graphic Design and EventRelations. It was made out of four circles, placed in the shape of a heart. The four circles were also present in the stage design, with the light construction made of the same four rings. The whole rig could be formed into various shapes to add to each country's staging. The design was described by its designers as "a modern expression of a heart which symbolises openness, warmth, attitudes, pulse and movement".

Cover art of the official album

The draw to the determine the running order of competing countries was held on 21 November 2000.

A compilation album featuring all 23 competing entries was released on 5 May 2001 by EMI Records and CMC International.

== Format ==
=== Entries ===
Each participating broadcaster was represented in the contest by one song, which was required to be no longer than three minutes in duration. A maximum of six performers were allowed on stage during each country's performance, and all performers must have reached the age of 16 in the year of the contest. Selected entries were not permitted to be released commercially before 1 January 2001, and were then only allowed to be released in the country they represented until after the contest was held. Entries were required to be selected by each country's participating broadcaster by 11 March, and the final submission date for all selected entries to be received by the contest organisers was set for 16 March. This submission was required to include a sound recording of the entry and backing track for use during the contest, a video presentation of the song on stage being performed by the artists, and the text of the song lyrics in its original language and translations in French and English for distribution to the participating broadcasters, their commentators and juries.

=== Voting procedure ===
The results of the 2001 contest were determined through the same scoring system as had first been introduced in 1975: each country awarded twelve points to its favourite entry, followed by ten points to its second favourite, and then awarded points in decreasing value from eight to one for the remaining songs which featured in the country's top ten, with countries unable to vote for their own entry. Each participating country was required to use televoting to determine their points. Viewers had a total of five minutes to register their vote by calling one of twenty-two different telephone numbers to represent the twenty-three competing entries except that which represented their own country, with voting lines opening following the performance of the last competing entry. Once phone lines were opened a video recap containing short clips of each competing entry with the accompanying phone number for voting was shown in order to aid viewers during the voting window. Systems were also put in place to prevent lobby groups from one country voting for their song by travelling to other countries.

Countries which were unable to hold a televote due to technological limitations were granted an exception, and their points were determined by an assembled jury of eight individuals, which was required to be split evenly between members of the public and music professionals, comprised additionally of an equal number of men and women, and below and above 30 years of age. Countries using televoting were also required to appoint a back-up jury of the same composition which would be called into action upon technical failure preventing the televote results from being used. Each jury member voted in secret and awarded between one and ten votes to each participating song, excluding that from their own country and with no abstentions permitted. The votes of each member were collected following the country's performance and then tallied by the non-voting jury chairperson to determine the points to be awarded.

== Contest overview ==
The contest was held on 12 May 2001 at 21:00 CEST and was won by Estonia. The table below outlines the participating countries, the order in which they performed, the competing artists and songs, and the results of the voting.

The show was opened by the last year's Eurovision winners, the Olsen Brothers, with a snippet from their winning Eurovision song "Fly on the Wings of Love", followed by their latest single "Walk Right Back", a smash hit in Denmark at the time. The interval act featured medley of songs performed by Aqua and Safri Duo.

The winner was Estonia represented by the song "Everybody", composed by Ivar Must, written by Maian-Anna Kärmas and performed by Tanel Padar, Dave Benton and 2XL. This marked Estonia's first victory in the contest. Norway meanwhile finished in last place for the ninth time.

Prior to the contest Greece were hotly tipped to win by the bookmakers, Sweden the second favourites, with France, Slovenia and host country Denmark expected to round out the top 5. However, as the voting progressed it quickly became a two-horse race between host Denmark and Estonia.

Estonia won with 198 points. Denmark came second with 177 points, with Greece, France, Sweden, Spain, Slovenia, Germany, Malta and Croatia completing the top ten. Netherlands, Poland, Ireland, Iceland and Norway occupied the bottom five positions.

Dave Benton, who was born and raised in Aruba, was the first black person and, at the age of 50 years and 101 days, the oldest contestant at the time to win the contest.

Winner

Results of the Eurovision Song Contest 2001
R/O	Country	Artist	Song	Points	Place
1	Netherlands	Michelle	"Out on My Own"	16	18
2	Iceland	Two Tricky	"Angel"	3	22
3	Bosnia and Herzegovina	Nino	"Hano"	29	14
4	Norway	Haldor Lægreid	"On My Own"	3	22
5	Israel	Tal Sondak	"Ein Davar"	25	16
6	Russia	Mumiy Troll	"Lady Alpine Blue"	37	12
7	Sweden	Friends	"Listen to Your Heartbeat"	100	5
8	Lithuania	Skamp	"You Got Style"	35	13
9	Latvia	Arnis Mednis	"Too Much"	16	18
10	Croatia	Vanna	"Strings of My Heart"	42	10
11	Portugal	MTM	"Só sei ser feliz assim"	18	17
12	Ireland	Gary O'Shaughnessy	"Without Your Love"	6	21
13	Spain	David Civera	"Dile que la quiero"	76	6
14	France	Natasha St-Pier	"Je n'ai que mon âme"	142	4
15	Turkey	Sedat Yüce	"Sevgiliye Son"	41	11
16	United Kingdom	Lindsay Dracass	"No Dream Impossible"	28	15
17	Slovenia	Nuša Derenda	"Energy"	70	7
18	Poland	Piasek	"2 Long"	11	20
19	Germany	Michelle	"Wer Liebe lebt"	66	8
20	Estonia	Tanel Padar, Dave Benton and 2XL	"Everybody"	198	1
21	Malta	Fabrizio Faniello	"Another Summer Night"	48	9
22	Greece	Antique	"Die for You"	147	3
23	Denmark	Rollo & King	"Never Ever Let You Go"	177	2

=== Spokespersons ===
Each participating broadcaster appointed a spokesperson who was responsible for announcing, in English or French, the votes for its respective country. As had been the case since the 1994 contest, the spokespersons were connected via satellite and appeared in vision during the broadcast. Spokespersons at the 2001 contest are listed below.

1. Netherlands – Marlayne
2. Iceland – Eva María Jónsdóttir
3. Bosnia and Herzegovina – Segmedina Srna
4. Norway – Roald Øyen
5. Israel – Yoav Ginai
6. Russia – Larisa Verbitskaya
7. Sweden – Josefine Sundström
8. Lithuania – Loreta Tarozaitė
9. Latvia – Renārs Kaupers
10. Croatia – Daniela Trbović
11. Portugal – Margarida Mercês de Melo
12. Ireland – Bláthnaid Ní Chofaigh
13. Spain – Jennifer Rope
14. France – Corinne Hermès
15. Turkey – Meltem Ersan Yazgan
16. United Kingdom – Colin Berry
17. Slovenia – Mojca Mavec
18. Poland – Maciej Orłoś
19. Germany – Axel Bulthaupt
20. Estonia – Ilomai Küttim "Elektra"
21. Malta – Marbeck Spiteri
22. Greece – Alexis Kostalas
23. Denmark – Gry Johansen

== Detailed voting results ==
The majority of participating countries held a televote, where the top ten most voted for songs were awarded the 12, 10, 8, 7, 6, 5, 4, 3, 2, 1 points. This year the EBU introduced for the first time a mix of voting systems (50% televoting and 50% jury) for those countries that didn't want to use 100% televoting. Only three votes were allowed per household.

According to the EBU rules, every broadcaster was free to make a choice between the full televoting system and the mixed 50-50 system. In exceptional circumstances, where televoting was not possible at all, only a jury was used.

Detailed voting results of the Eurovision Song Contest 2001
		Total score	Netherlands	Iceland	Bosnia and Herzegovina	Norway	Israel	Russia	Sweden	Lithuania	Latvia	Croatia	Portugal	Ireland	Spain	France	Turkey	United Kingdom	Slovenia	Poland	Germany	Estonia	Malta	Greece	Denmark
Contestants	Netherlands	16					5	1					6						4						
Contestants	Iceland	3				1																			2
Contestants	Bosnia and Herzegovina	29							4			10							7				1		7
Contestants	Norway	3											3												
Contestants	Israel	25			6											10	7							2	
Contestants	Russia	37		5			3			10	8											4	2	5	
Contestants	Sweden	100		7	3	2	8	2		2	6	4	5	8	5	2	8	8		5		7	8		10
Contestants	Lithuania	35	5	1	2		4	10	1		5			1				4	2						
Contestants	Latvia	16								8												8			
Contestants	Croatia	42			7												10		5		3		10	7	
Contestants	Portugal	18													6	**12**									
Contestants	Ireland	6											1					5							
Contestants	Spain	76	7	2	5	4	**12**		5		4		7	3		5	6	3	1	1		3		8	
Contestants	France	142	8	4	**12**	7	2	**12**	6	7	7	6	**12**	7	3		1	6	6	10	6	10		4	6
Contestants	Turkey	41	3									7				7					7		4	10	3
Contestants	United Kingdom	28	2					3		3	3	3	2	4	1					2	2		3		
Contestants	Slovenia	70	4	6	10	6	1	4	7	4		8		2	2	1				6	4	5			
Contestants	Poland	11							2										3		5				1
Contestants	Germany	66	1			3		8			1	1	10	6	10	6	3	2		4		1	5	1	4
Contestants	Estonia	**198**	**12**	10	4	10	6	6	8	**12**	**12**	2		10	8	8	**12**	**12**	**12**	**12**	10		**12**	**12**	8
Contestants	Malta	48		3	1	5		7	3	1					4		2	1		3	1	2		3	**12**
Contestants	Greece	147	6	8	8	8	10	5	**12**	5	2	5	4	5	**12**	3	5	7	8	8	8	6	7		5
Contestants	Denmark	177	10	**12**		**12**	7		10	6	10	**12**	8	**12**	7	4	4	10	10	7	**12**	**12**	6	6	

=== 12 points ===
The below table summarises how the maximum 12 points were awarded from one country to another. The winning country is shown in bold. Estonia received the maximum score of 12 points from nine of the voting countries, with Denmark receiving six sets of 12 points each, France receiving three sets, Greece receiving two, and Malta, Portugal and Spain each receiving one maximum score.

Distribution of 12 points awarded at the Eurovision Song Contest 2001
N.	Contestant	Nation(s) giving 12 points
9	**Estonia**	Greece, Latvia, Lithuania, Malta, Netherlands, Poland, Slovenia, Turkey, United Kingdom
6	Denmark	Croatia, Estonia, Germany, Iceland, Ireland, Norway
3	France	Bosnia and Herzegovina, Portugal, Russia
2	Greece	Spain, Sweden
1	Malta	Denmark
1	Portugal	France
1	Spain	Israel

== Broadcasts ==
Each participating broadcaster was required to relay live and in full the contest via television. Non-participating EBU member broadcasters were also able to relay the contest as "passive participants"; any passive countries wishing to participate in the following year's event were also required to provide a live broadcast of the contest or a deferred broadcast within 24 hours. Broadcasters were able to send commentators to provide coverage of the contest in their own native language and to relay information about the artists and songs to their viewers. Known details on the broadcasts in each country, including the specific broadcasting stations and commentators, are shown in the tables below.

In addition to the broadcasts by EBU members, the contest was also available on the internet for the second time. Sponsored by Yahoo!, a webcast of the contest was available around the world.

Broadcasters and commentators in participating countries
Country	Broadcaster	Channel(s)	Commentator(s)	Ref(s)
Croatia	HRT	HRT 1		
Denmark	DR	DR1	Hans Otto Bisgaard and Hilda Heick	
Denmark	DR	DR P3		
Estonia	ETV		Marko Reikop	
Estonia	ER	Raadio 2		
France	France Télévisions	France 3	Marc-Olivier Fogiel and Dave	
Germany	ARD	Das Erste	Peter Urban	
Iceland	RÚV	Sjónvarpið	Gísli Marteinn Baldursson	
Ireland	RTÉ	RTÉ One	Marty Whelan	
Ireland	RTÉ	RTÉ Radio 1	Larry Gogan	
Latvia	LTV		Kārlis Streips	
Lithuania	LRT	LRT	Darius Užkuraitis	
Malta	PBS	TVM, Radio Malta		
Netherlands	NOS	Nederland 2	Willem van Beusekom	
Netherlands	NCRV	Radio 2	Michiel van Erp	
Netherlands	TROS	Radio 3	Paul de Leeuw and Cornald Maas	
Norway	NRK	NRK1	Jostein Pedersen	
Norway	NRK	NRK P1	Stein Dag Jensen and Hege Tepstad	
Poland	TVP	TVP1	Artur Orzech	
Portugal	RTP	RTP1 (Note: Additional live broadcast on RTP Internacional)	Eládio Clímaco	
Russia	ORT (Note: Also broadcast deferred via the Orbita satellite broadcasting system in the Russian Far East)		Alexander Anatolyevich and Konstantin Mikhailov	
Slovenia	RTVSLO	SLO 1		
Spain	TVE	La Primera	José Luis Uribarri	
Sweden	SVT	SVT1	Henrik Olsson	
Sweden	SR	SR P4	Carolina Norén and Björn Kjellman	
Turkey	TRT	TRT 1 (Note: Additional live broadcast on TRT Int)		
United Kingdom	BBC	BBC One (Note: Additional live broadcast on BBC Prime)	Terry Wogan	
United Kingdom	BBC	BBC Radio 2	Ken Bruce	

Broadcasters and commentators in non-participating countries
Country	Broadcaster	Channel(s)	Commentator(s)	Ref(s)
Australia	SBS	SBS TV (Note: Broadcast without postcards and voting on 13 May 2001 at 20:30 (AEST); contest later broadcast in full on 27 May 2001 at 14:30 (AEST))	Effie Stephanidis and Terry Wogan (Note: SBS's coverage of the 2001 contest consisted of excerpts from the event in Copenhagen with commentary by Terry Wogan interspersed with live footage from the SBS studios. The SBS Eurovision party was hosted by Mary Coustas as Effie Stephanidis and featured a panel of 23 Australian celebrities representing the competing countries and a phone and internet vote to determine Australia's favourite entry. Due to complaints at the change of format the contest was later broadcast in full and unedited with UK commentary.)	
Austria	ORF	ORF 1	Andi Knoll	
Austria	ORF	FM4	Stermann & Grissemann	
Belgium	VRT	TV1	André Vermeulen and Anja Daems	
Belgium	RTBF	La Une	Jean-Pierre Hautier	
Cyprus	CyBC	RIK Dyo	Evi Papamichail	
Falkland Islands	BFBS	BFBS Television (Note: Deferred broadcast at 21:00 (FKT))		
Faroe Islands	SvF			
Finland	YLE	YLE TV1	Jani Juntunen and Asko Murtomäki	
Finland	YLE	YLE Radio Vega		
Romania	TVR	România 1	Leonard Miron	
Switzerland	SRG SSR	SF 2	Sandra Studer	
Switzerland	SRG SSR	TSR 1	Phil Mundwiller	
Switzerland	SRG SSR	TSI 1		
Yugoslavia	YU Info			

== Incidents ==
Controversy was again rife in the contest: the BBC television commentator Terry Wogan repeatedly made critical comments about the hosts, and dubbed them "Doctor Death and the Tooth Fairy/The Little Mermaid" after providing their entire commentary in rhyming couplets. The Danes were so offended that the BBC was obliged to issue an apology on Wogan's comments.

Controversy also surrounded the Swedish song, "Listen To Your Heartbeat", which was repeatedly accused as a plagiarism of the Belgian 1996 entry, "Liefde is een kaartspel". Eventually the EBU decided for the matter to be settled in court, with the song allowed to compete as long as the courts did not declare the song as plagiarism. At first this was denied by the Swedish songwriters, one of whom was Thomas G:son, but after the Belgian songwriters and the author's organisation SABAM pressed for legal action, a cash settlement was agreed.

During the voting the Danish band Aqua performed with a medley of their singles, with percussion ensemble Safri Duo performing in the medley. Although enjoyable, people complained about it being a little bit "rude" as there was some swearing during the performance, both at the beginning and end of "Barbie Girl".

== Other awards ==
=== Barbara Dex Award ===
The Barbara Dex Award is the award, created by fansite House of Eurovision, was awarded to the performer deemed to have been the "worst dressed" among the participants. The winner in 2001 was Polish representative Piasek, as determined by the visitors of the website House of Eurovision.
