= XTM (band) =

Spanish dance music group

- Origin: Catalonia, Spain
- Genres: Mákina, trance
- Years active: 2000-2005
- Label: Cyber Music
- Past members: Xasqui; Toni Ten

XTM was a Spanish dance music act consisting of brothers Xasqui and Toni Ten. They are best known for their 2003 trance cover version of the song "Fly on the Wings of Love", which was originally the winner of the Eurovision Song Contest in 2000, performed by the Danish duet Olsen Brothers.

XTM's cover of Fly on the Wings of Love, featuring DJ Chucky and vocals by Annia (real name Eva Martí), reached number 8 on the UK Singles Chart and spent 19 weeks in the top 75 and topped The Box's 2003 most played chart. It sold more than 200,000 copies, and reached #32 in the top 40 biggest selling singles of the year. The music video was shot entirely with CGI graphics.

XTM's 2005 follow-up Give Me Your Love, also featuring vocals by Annia, charted at number-one in the Pop Tip Chart and at number 1 in the DMC Mainstream Chart, and reached number 28 in the UK Singles Chart. XTM have also covered Jermaine Jackson and Pia Zadora's "When The Rain Begins To Fall".

== Discography ==
=== Singles ===
Year	Single	Peak chart positions			Album
Year	Single	IRE	NED	UK	Album
2003	"Fly on the Wings of Love"	1	31	8	Singles only
2005	"Give Me Your Love"	28	—	28	Singles only
"—" denotes releases that did not chart
