= Michelle (German singer) =

German schlager singer

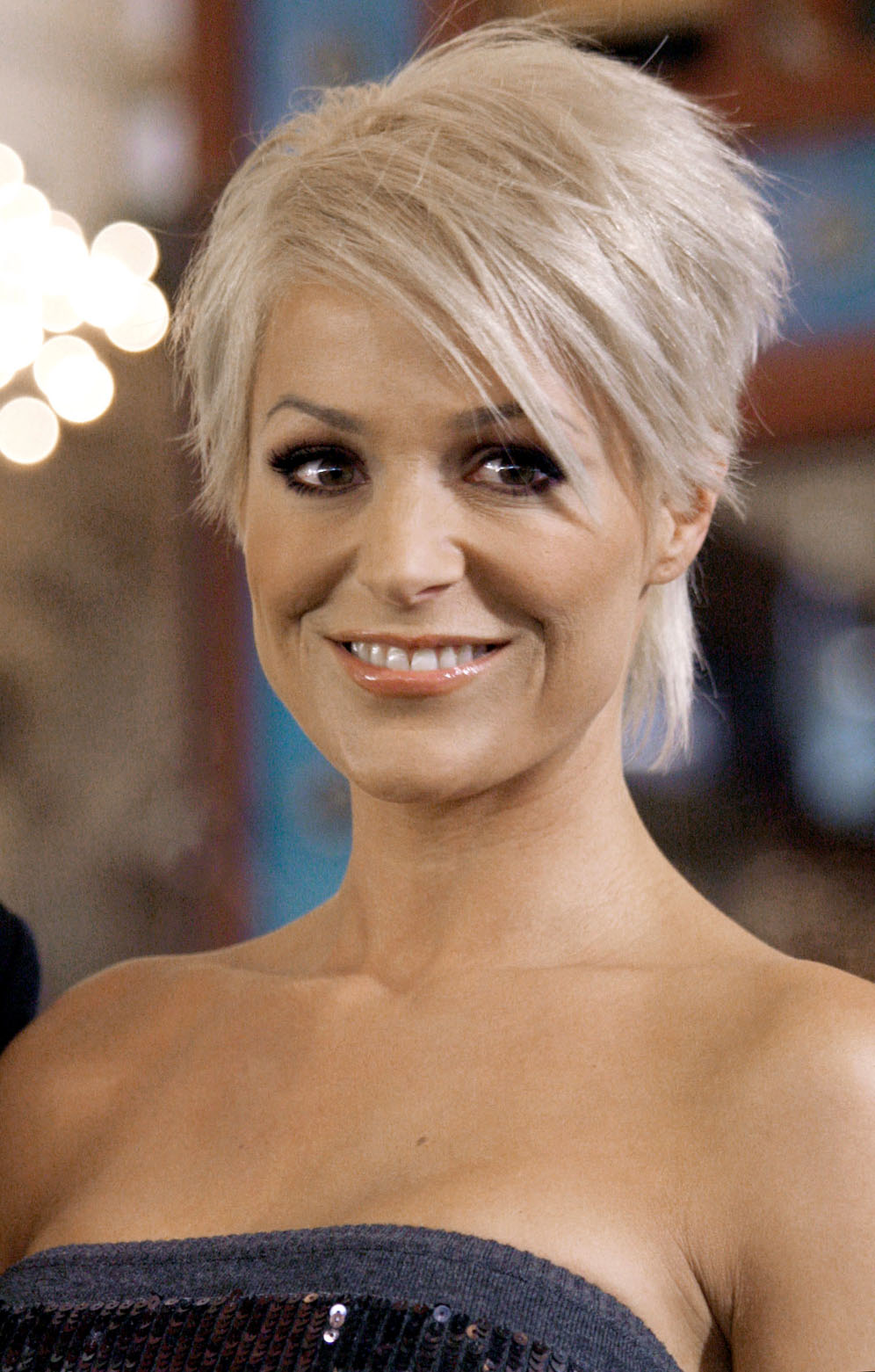
- Michelle in 2009

Background information
- Born: Tanja Gisela Hewer; 15 February 1972 (age 54); Villingen-Schwenningen, West Germany
- Genres: Schlager; Europop
- Occupation: Singer
- Years active: 1993–2026

Tanja Gisela Hewer (born 15 February 1972), known by the stage name Michelle, is a German schlager singer. She represented Germany in the Eurovision Song Contest 2001 with the song Wer Liebe lebt ("To Live for Love"), which placed eighth from 23 participating countries with 66 points. Since her debut in 1992 she has won numerous awards, including two Echo awards, two Goldene Stimmgabeln and two Amadeus Austria awards. She sold more than 6,2 Million Copies in Europe.

== Early life ==
Born in Villingen-Schwenningen, Michelle grew up in Blumberg with a sister and a brother in a difficult social background, her parents being violent alcoholics. At the age of 10 she became a foster child. She has been singing in local amateur bands since age 14.

== Career ==
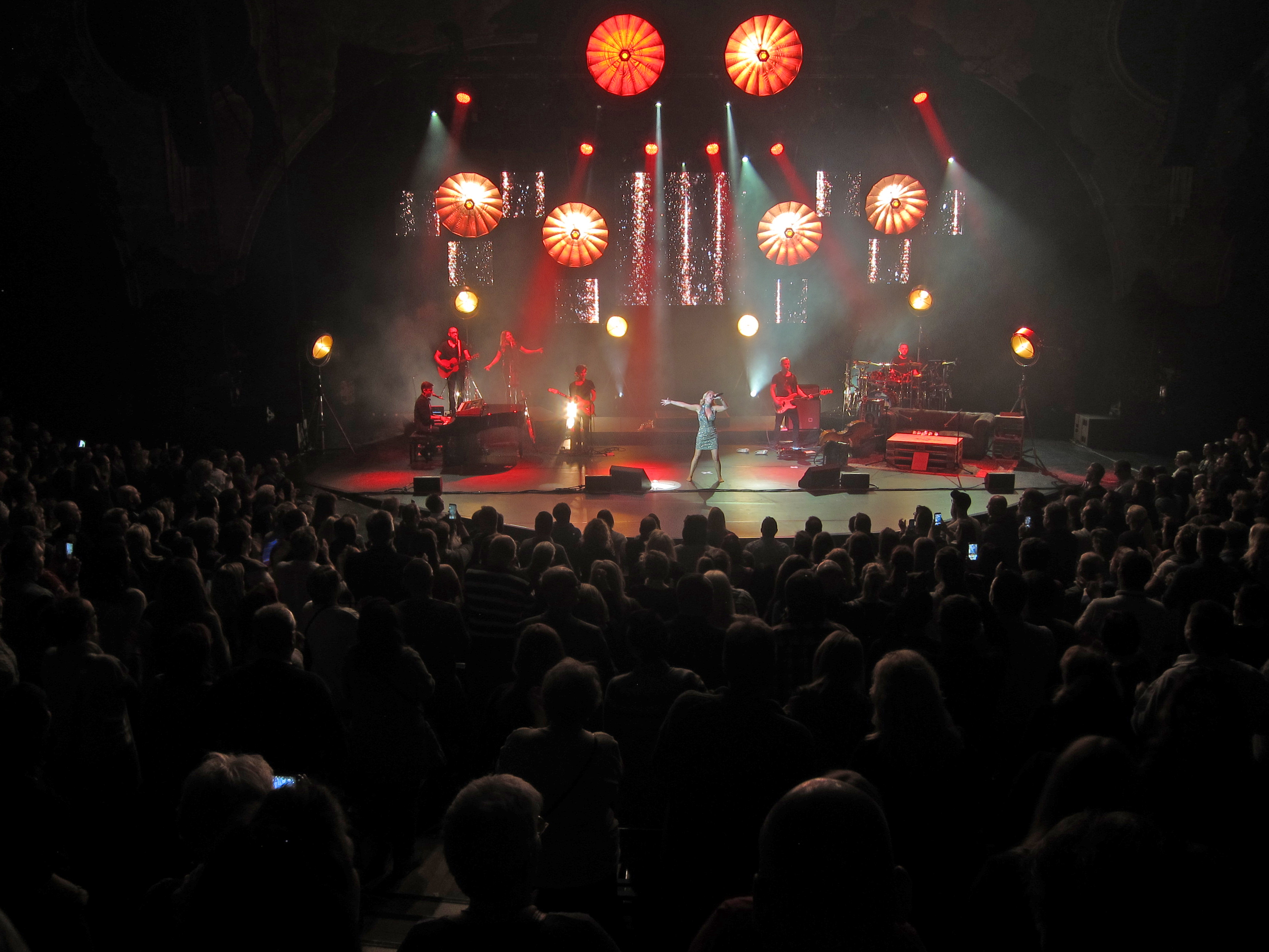
Michelle in Berlin, 2017

Through a friend who was working at a state broadcast company, she got the chance to perform on German TV in 1993. Popular German singer Kristina Bach recognized Michelle's talent. A little bit later, the songwriter Jean Frankfurter wrote and produced the song Und heut' Nacht will ich tanzen which became a great success and reached the top of the German charts. Michelle got the chance to perform at ZDF-Hitparade, one of Germany's most popular music shows of the time. Her performance made her popular throughout the country.

Afterwards she participated in several German pop music festivals, for example the preliminary competitions for the Eurovision Song Contest or the traditional "Deutsches Schlagerfestival". She won the latter in 1997 with her single Wie Flammen im Wind ("Like flames in the wind"). The album, with the same name, gained her her first TOP 10 success in Germany. The following years marked the heyday of her career, gaining her two more top 10 albums, golden records and the chance to represent Germany in 2001's Eurovision Song Contest in Copenhagen.

Her 2005 comeback album Leben ("Life") was another success, reaching TOP 3 in Germany and was awarded another golden record. Afterwards she started a modelling career and in 2006 released My Passion, a cover album of disco classics.

In October 2009, she released a new album called Goodbye Michelle and played several concerts and TV shows, explaining she wanted "to give her fans a real farewell". She stated, however, that this was definitely her final album under the name Michelle. The new single from her album Goodbye Michelle will be Nur noch dieses Lied. It's the second single after the song Goodbye Michelle. The third single will be Gefallener Engel in May 2010.

In November 2010, she released her new album "Der beste Moment". In March 2012, she released the album "L'amour" including her new hit "Große Liebe". In March 2014, she released The Ultimate Best Of album including seven new songs. The 14th studio album was recorded in April 2016, with her new single "Wir feiern das Leben". The album reached the top 10 in Germany and Austria.

== Personal life ==
Michelle has three daughters and lives in Cologne.

== Discography ==
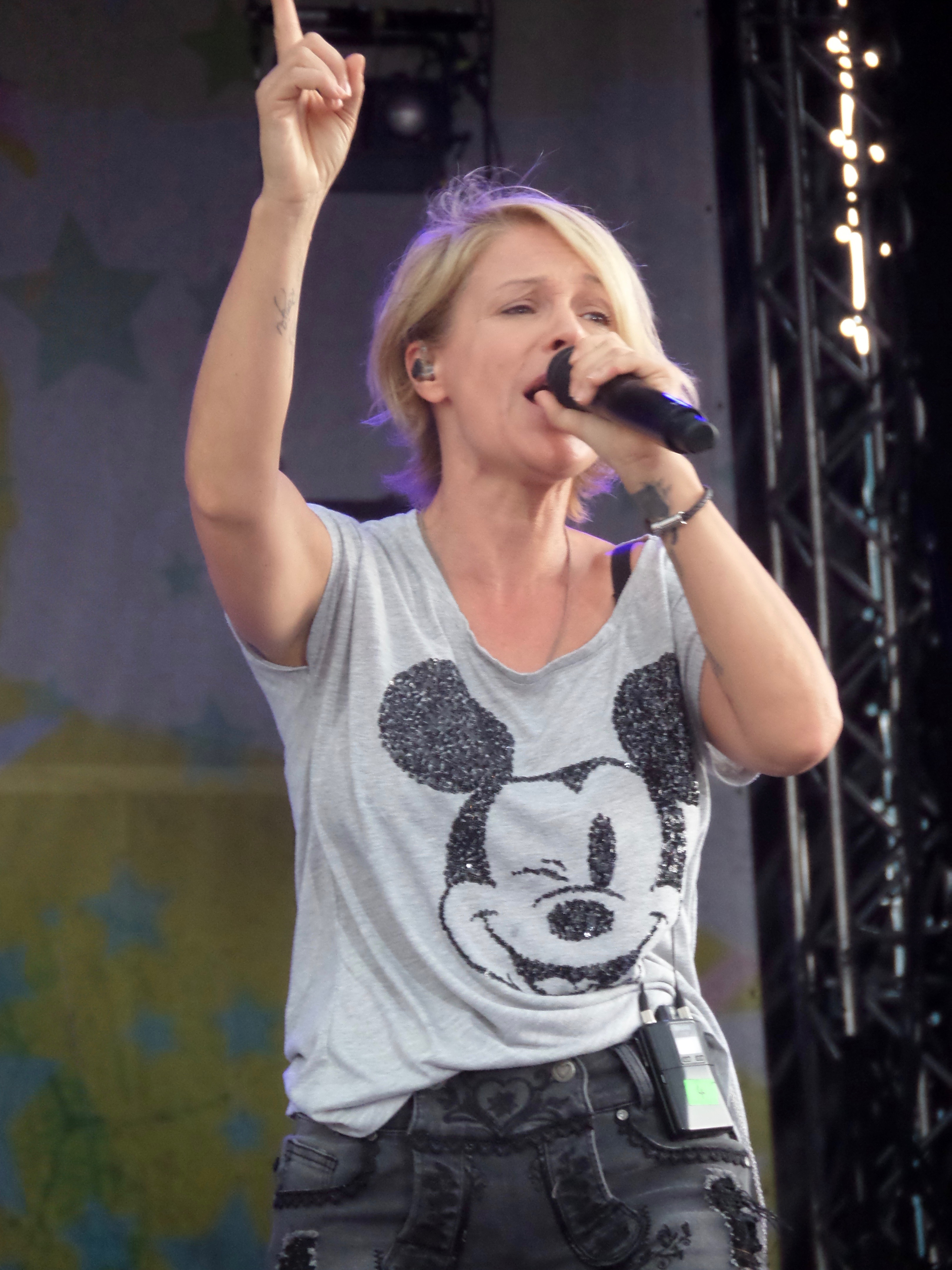
Michelle performing in 2019

Studio albums, Compilations and Remix albums

- 1993: Erste Sehnsucht
- 1995: Traumtänzerball
- 1997: Wie Flammen im Wind
- 1998: Nenn es Liebe oder Wahnsinn
- 1999: Meine größten Erfolge
- 1999: Denk'ich an Weihnacht
- 2000: So was wie Liebe
- 2001: Best of
- 2002: Rouge
- 2005: Leben!
- 2006: My Passion (as Tanja Thomas)
- 2006: Glas
- 2007: Zwischenspiel
- 2009: The very Best of
- 2009: Goodbye Michelle
- 2010: Der beste Moment
- 2012: L'amour
- 2014: Die Ultimative Best of
- 2015: Die Ultimative Best of Live
- 2016: Ich würd' es wieder tun
- 2018: Tabu
- 2020: Anders ist gut
- 2022: 30 Jahre Michelle – Das war's... noch nicht!
- 2024: Flutlicht

| Preceded by Stefan Raab with Wadde hadde dudde da? | Germany in the Eurovision Song Contest; 2001 | Succeeded by Corinna May with I Can't Live Without Music |
