= Rudolph Moshammer =

German fashion designer (1940–2005)

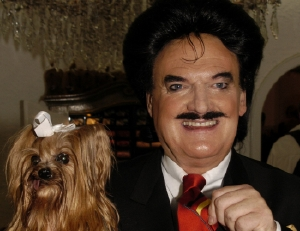
- Moshammer with his dog Daisy, 2004
- Born: 27 September 1940; Munich, German Reich
- Died: 14 January 2005 (aged 64); Grünwald, Germany
- Cause of death: Strangulation
- Occupation: Fashion designer

Rudolph Moshammer (27 September 1940 – 14 January 2005) was a German fashion designer. He built a reputation for the extravagant clothes he designed and wore, and was well known in Germany's celebrity circuit.

Moshammer was murdered in 2005 in the Grünwald suburb of Munich, Germany.

== Career ==
Born in Munich, Moshammer had an education in retail industry trading. He began to design fashion in the 1960s.

His first business was his boutique "Carnaval de Venise" in Munich's high society street, Maximilianstraße. There he created fashion for wealthy men from furs, cashmere, and silk. With this strategy, he attracted the high society of Munich and Germany. His international clients included Arnold Schwarzenegger, Johannes, 11th Prince of Thurn and Taxis, actor Richard Chamberlain, King Carl XVI Gustaf of Sweden, José Carreras, Siegfried and Roy, and German media personality Thomas Gottschalk.

He initially ran the boutique together with his mother, Else Moshammer. He had a strong relationship with her and frequently appeared in public with her. She died in 1993.

He collaborated with the musical band "Münchner Zwietracht" ("Munich Discord"), with whom he was a contestant in the German Eurovision Song Contest preliminary round show in 2001. The song was entitled "Teilt Freud und Leid" ("Share Happiness and Sorrow").

In 2002, Moshammer sold a shirt thought to have been worn by Napoleon I at the Battle of Waterloo at auction for more than €62,000 (US$81,200), donating the proceeds to a Munich homeless charity.

== Death ==
On the morning of 14 January 2005, at 9:00 am, Moshammer's chauffeur found him dead in his mansion in Grünwald, a suburb south of Munich. According to first reports of the public prosecutors, Moshammer had been strangled with an electric cable. The cable was found near the dead body. Daisy was found unharmed in the living room of his mansion.

The Munich police gave a press conference at noon on Sunday 16 January, reporting that a 25-year-old Iraqi asylum seeker Herisch Ali Abdullah, who had been tracked down through a DNA database, had admitted murdering Moshammer. It has been alleged that Moshammer had refused to pay €2,000 to the man, who was in financial difficulties, in return for sexual favors. Abdullah was sentenced to a minimum of 15 years to life in prison for the murder.

== Legacy ==
Moshammer was one of Germany's most successful fashion designers after Karl Lagerfeld, Jil Sander and Wolfgang Joop. Furthermore, he committed his wealth to helping homeless people. He had recently begun to build a house for the homeless in Munich.

== Daisy ==
Daisy, born as Irina de Pittacus, (20 September 1993 – 24 October 2006) was the dog of Moshammer. In an interview with the magazine Stern, Moshammer said that he had owned four dogs with this name.

The Yorkshire Terrier Irina de Pittacus was born a puppy in Jockgrim to the male Drakula in the care of breeder Christel Nicklis. At the age of four months, Moshammer purchased the animal and gave it the name "Daisy". In the arm of the designer, always with a ribbon on her head, Daisy became a trademark of the extravagant designer and was often seen in the German media.

Moshammer devoted a book and a website to Daisy. She was also the namesake for a line of grooming products for dogs launched by Moshammer. In addition the designer developed a collection of dog clothing. In 2005, she had a short guest appearance on the RTL series Unter uns.

On the night of 13 to 14 January 2005, Daisy was probably the single "eyewitness" to Moshammer's murder. Subsequently, there were rumors that Moshammer had put in his will that Daisy should have lifelong living privileges in his villa in Munich. She was to be cared for there by Moshammer's chauffeur, Andreas Kaplan. Even before the opening of the will, the breeder Nicklis had offered to take the dog. In the long run, the dog was taken by Kaplan, who had cared for the animal before and was generously considered in the will.

Daisy died at the age of thirteen in Munich. She was cremated hours later in a Munich crematorium. The urn containing her ashes was kept by Kaplan.

== Books (in German) ==
- Moshammer, Rudolph: Nicht nur Kleider machen Leute (Not only clothes make the man) (1993), ISBN 3-7962-0096-6
- Moshammer, Rudolph: Mama und ich (Mum and I) (1995), ISBN 3-8004-1324-8
- Moshammer, Rudolph: Elegant kochen ohne Schnickschnack. Zurück zum Wesentlichen (1997), ISBN 3-87287-440-3
- Moshammer, Rudolph: Ich, Daisy. Bekenntnisse einer Hundedame (I, Daisy. Confessions of a Lady Dog)(1998), ISBN 3-8004-1379-5
- Moshammer, Rudolph: Mein Christkindlbuch (2000), ISBN 3-7766-2194-X
- Moshammer, Rudolph: Mein geliebtes München (My Beloved Munich) (2002), ISBN 3-7766-2272-5
