= Stefan Raab =

German entertainer

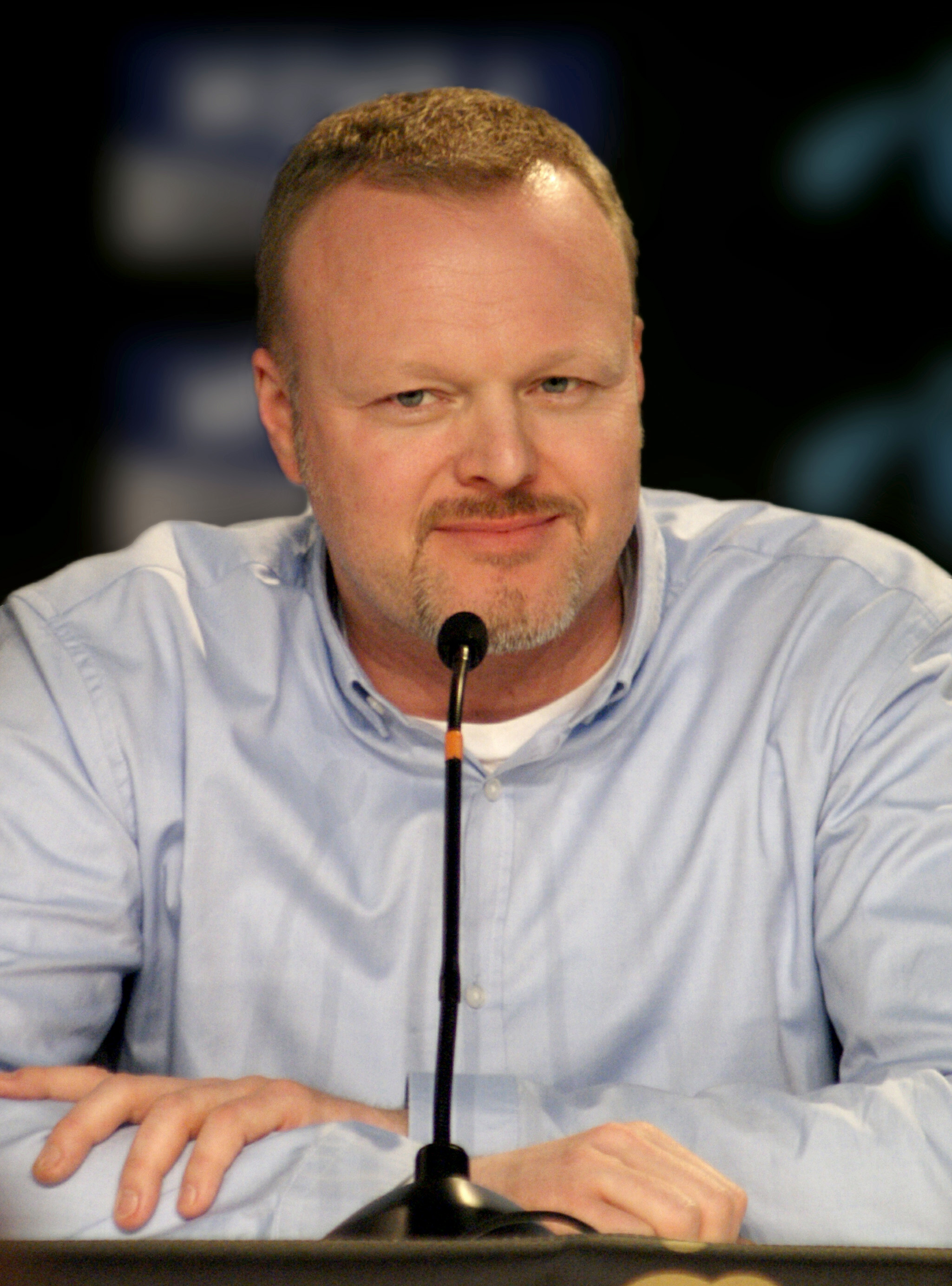
- Raab at a Eurovision Song Contest 2010 press conference
- Born: Stefan Konrad Raab; 20 October 1966 (age 60); Cologne, West Germany
- Occupations: Entertainer; television host; producer; businessman; musician
- Years active: 1990–2015, 2024–present (entertainer); 2018–present (as producer)
- Children: 2

Stefan Konrad Raab (born 20 October 1966) is a German entertainer, television host, producer, and businessman. From 1999 to 2015, he hosted the late-night comedy talk show TV total on ProSieben and also created a number of other television shows on the channel, most notably Schlag den Raab and Bundesvision Song Contest. Since 2025 he hosts the weekly personality- and late night show Die Stefan Raab Show.

Raab began his TV career hosting the comedy show Vivasion in 1993. He became well known in 1994 after composing a hit single spoofing national football coach Berti Vogts. In the early 2010s, German media considered him the "most powerful man in German entertainment television".

Raab is also credited with inventing wok racing and known for his recurring role as either producer, writer and/or performer of the German entries to the Eurovision Song Contest from 1998 to 2012. He was the initiator of the national pre-selection show Unser Star für Oslo ("Our Star for Oslo"), in which Germany's winning entry at the 2010 contest in Oslo was determined.

In 2015, Raab ended his on-screen career while staying active as a television producer. He made his public return in 2024.

== Early life ==
Raab grew up in Cologne with his sister and their parents, who owned a butcher's shop. He attended Jesuit boarding school Aloisiuskolleg in Bonn. Before entering the entertainment business, he completed an apprenticeship as a butcher in his parents' shop and studied law before dropping out of university after five semesters.

== Career ==
=== Television ===
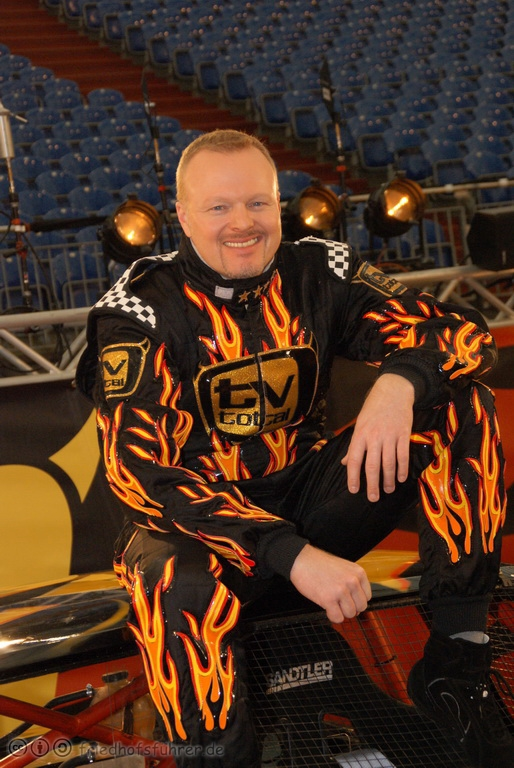
Raab during the "TV total Stock Car Crash Challenge" in 2010

Raab became popular in Germany as the host of the comedy show Vivasion for German music television channel VIVA from 1993 to 1998.

In 1999, he created TV total which began airing in April 2001 on ProSieben, four times a week. While TV total started as a comedy format mainly showing and satirizing funny and embarrassing sequences from other television programs, it soon came to be more of a late night show featuring musical performances—in some ways similar to The Tonight Show with Jay Leno or Late Night with Conan O'Brien.

After a boxing match against Regina Halmich in 2001 and a speed skating race against Claudia Pechstein in 2002, he also created several other celebrity sports events that are produced regularly, including TV total Turmspringen (high diving) and TV total Stock Car Crash Challenge (stock car racing). He also brought fun and variety to the show by invented new sports: In November 2003, he initiated the first "official" World Wok racing Championship in Winterberg, Germany. Modified Chinese woks are used to make timed runs down an Olympic bobsled track. The championship took place annually until March 2011, in Innsbruck. The first Autoball EM — Autoball being a version of football played in cars and using an exercise ball to score goals — took place in 2007.

In 2006, Raab invented the game show Schlag den Raab (German for "Beat the Raab", remade for British television as Beat the Star and as Beat Your Host in several other European countries), in which he competed against a contestant in various disciplines. Some episodes of the show lasted more than five hours with excellent ratings.

Raab also organized PokerStars.de Nacht, a poker event featuring some celebrity names in German entertainment.

In September 2012, he announced that he would be hosting a new talk show on ProSieben which would include political guests. It began airing on 11 November 2012. It stood in direct competition with the self-titled talk show hosted by Günther Jauch.

In September 2013, Raab was one of four hosts (one from each big television network) at the federal election debate between chancellor Angela Merkel and her challenger Peer Steinbrück.

In mid-2015, Raab announced his retirement from television and stated that he would remain hosting until the end of the year. The last episode of his show TV total aired on 16 December and the last episode of Schlag den Raab aired on 19 December 2015.

He made his return in 2024 with a show titled Du gewinnst hier nicht die Million on RTL+, which has been described as a combination of TV total and Schlag den Raab. In June 2025, the show was cancelled and in fall 2025 Raabs new late-night-show Die Stefan Raab Show aired on RTL. Since 2024 he shows up in the gameshow Stefan und Bully gegen irgendson Schnulli, where he teams up with German director and comedian Michael "Bully" Herbig to beat a candidate in various game disciplines. Together with Barbara Schöneberger Raab hosts the quiz- and gameshow Wer weiß wie wann was war?.

=== Music ===
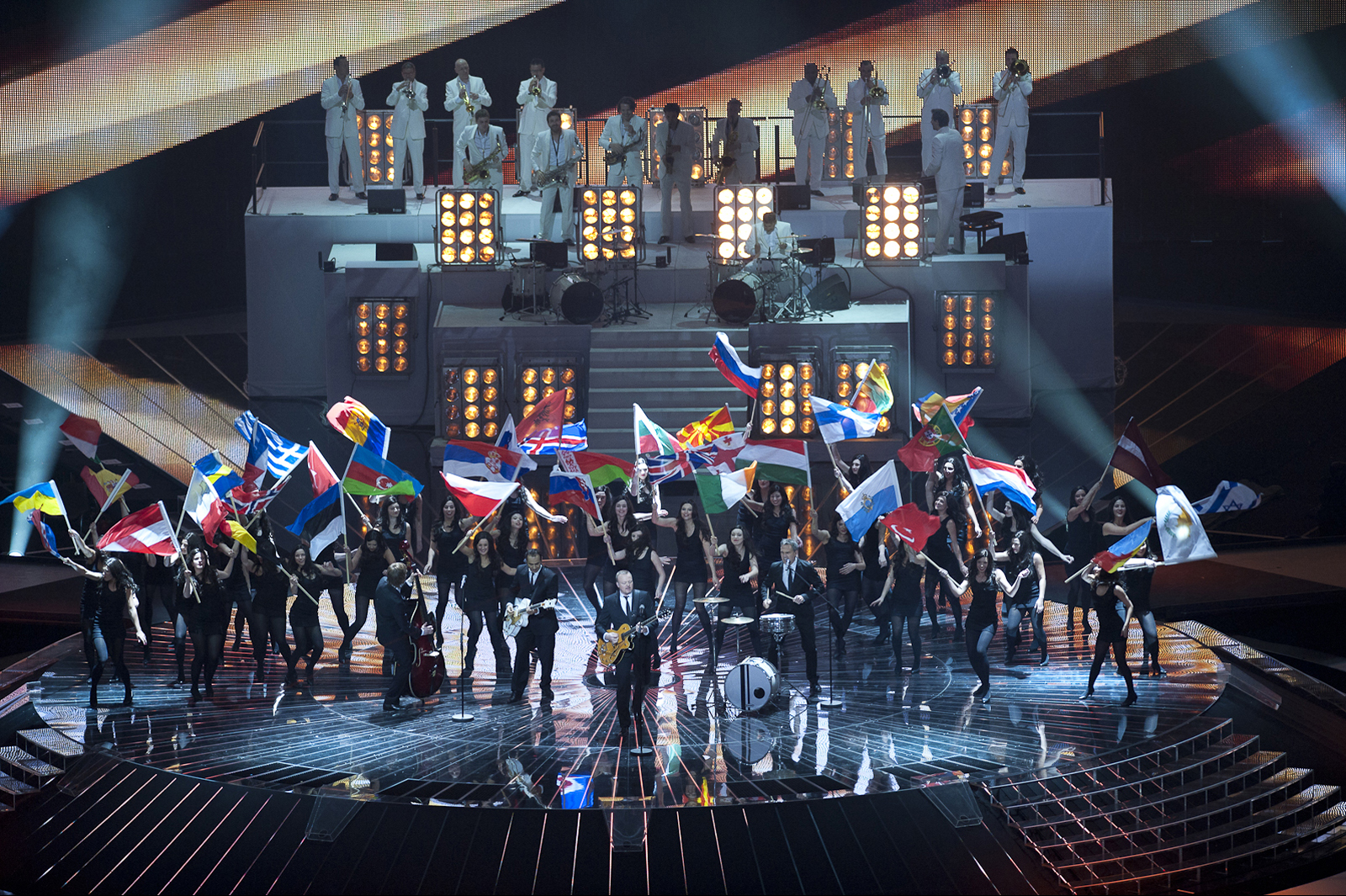
Raab performing "Satellite" at the Eurovision Song Contest 2011

As a musician, Raab is an autodidact, playing various instruments, such as piano, drums, guitar, ukulele, and some wind instruments. He began working as a freelance producer and composer of jingles and radio commercials in 1990 at his own studio in Cologne.

From 1994 onwards, he produced a number of popular songs, including "Böörti Böörti Vogts" (a song about Berti Vogts), "Hier kommt die Maus" ("Here comes the mouse", a tribute to the children's television series Die Sendung mit der Maus), "Maschen-Draht-Zaun", "Wir kiffen", "Gebt das Hanf frei!" ("Legalise Dope!", featuring Shaggy and samples from German politician Hans-Christian Ströbele), "Hol' mir ma' 'ne Flasche Bier" ("Get me a bottle o' beer", containing samples from then-chancellor Gerhard Schröder), "Space Taxi" from the soundtrack of the film Traumschiff Surprise – Periode 1, "Pa aufs Maul", and "Rambo Zambo (Was is Bubatz?)" where Raab used the clipout of a speech of the German chancellor Friedrich Merz.

Based on the concept of the Eurovision Song Contest, Raab created and hosted the Bundesvision Song Contest (Bundesrepublik Deutschland = Federal Republic of Germany), which first aired on ProSieben in 2005. The contest features representatives from each of the 16 states of Germany and stipulates that their song has to be at least partly in German. It took place yearly until Raab's preliminary retirement in 2015.

=== Involvement in the Eurovision Song Contest ===
Raab wrote the song for the German entry to the Eurovision Song Contest 1998, Guildo Horn's "Guildo hat euch lieb!". After placing first in the pre-selection competition Countdown Grand Prix 1998, it finished the main contest in seventh place. Raab participated himself as the German entry to the Eurovision Song Contest 2000 with the nonsense song "Wadde hadde dudde da?". He placed first in the pre-selection competition Countdown Grand Prix Eurovision 2000 and finished the contest in fifth place. For the Eurovision Song Contest 2004, Raab created and hosted a talent show called SSDSGPS ("Stefan sucht den Super-Grand-Prix-Star", "Stefan seeks the super Grand-Prix star", satirising the title of the German Idol series Deutschland sucht den Superstar, DSDS). The competition was won by Max Mutzke, who finished the main contest in eighth place.

In 2009, Raab was approached by the public broadcaster NDR, a member of the ARD broadcasting consortium, to jointly organise a national pre-selection in order to determine the German entry for the Eurovision Song Contest 2010. It was revealed that Raab initially refused the request, but that his television network ProSieben accepted the offer to work with ARD/NDR. As a result of the cooperation, the talent show contest Unser Star für Oslo (Our Star for Oslo) took place from 2 February 2010 onwards, stretching across 8 shows. Raab took a lead role in the programmes as head of the jury. In the national final on 12 March 2010, Lena Meyer-Landrut emerged as winner. On 29 May 2010, Meyer-Landrut won the Eurovision Song Contest 2010 with the song "Satellite", claiming the first German Eurovision victory in 28 years.

The cooperation between NDR and ProSieben was continued for the Eurovision Song Contest 2011. Meyer-Landrut was confirmed as the artist of the German entry after her successful win in the previous contest. The pre-selection competition Unser Song für Deutschland was held to determine the song of the German entry, with Meyer-Landrut performing twelve songs to be voted on by the public. Raab was involved in the selection of the competing entries, some of which he also wrote and composed, and was a juror on the final of the competition. "Taken by a Stranger", which was produced by Raab, emerged as the winning song. In May 2011, Raab acted as co-host of the main contest alongside Anke Engelke and Judith Rakers, with Meyer-Landrut finishing in tenth place.

The week following the 2011 final, Raab announced he would end his Eurovision involvement as a pre-selection host, chairman of the jury, composer and musical producer. However, he still returned in 2012 as creator and producer of the pre-selection competition Unser Star für Baku. Raab participated as a regular jury member and was succeeded as jury president by Thomas D. The competition was won by Roman Lob with "Standing Still", which finished the main contest in eighth place. Raab was no longer involved from the Eurovision Song Contest 2013 onwards, as the cooperation between NDR and ProSieben was dissolved.

After Raab came out of his retirement as entertainer and television host in 2024, he reportedly offered to produce a pre-selection competition for the Eurovision Song Contest 2025 to be hosted jointly by public and private broadcasters. In October 2024, Raab was confirmed to return as creator, producer and jury member of the pre-selection competition Chefsache ESC 2025: Wer singt für Deutschland?. The television shows aired on Das Erste as well as private channel RTL, where Raab had signed an exclusive contract. The duo Abor & Tynna won the contest and represented Germany at the Eurovision Song Contest, where they reached 15th place.

==== Participations ====
Year	Place of event	Artist	Song	Involvement as	Position	Points
1998	Birmingham, England	Guildo Horn	"Guildo hat euch lieb!"	Composer	7	86
2000	Stockholm, Sweden	Stefan Raab	"Wadde hadde dudde da?"	Performer, composer	5	96
2004	Istanbul, Turkey	Max Mutzke	Can't Wait Until Tonight	Discoverer, composer, mentor	8	93
2010	Oslo, Norway	Lena Meyer-Landrut	"Satellite"	Creator and jury president of Unser Star für Oslo, mentor	1	246
2011	Düsseldorf, Germany	Lena Meyer-Landrut	"Taken by a Stranger"	Creator and jury president of Unser Song für Deutschland, music producer, mentor, host	10	107
2012	Baku, Azerbaijan	Roman Lob	"Standing Still"	Creator and jury member of Unser Star für Baku	8	110
2025	Basel, Switzerland	Abor & Tynna	"Baller"	Creator and jury member of Chefsache ESC 2025	15	151

== Personal life ==
Raab lives in a suburb of Cologne, Hahnwald, next to German Painter Gerhard Richter, and has two daughters (born 2004 and 2006) with his girlfriend Nike. Other than this, very little is known about Raab, who deliberately hides his private life from the media.

== Controversies ==
Raab has been the subject of lawsuits throughout his career, some of which have gained public attention. The two most referenced cases are:

- The case of then 16-year-old model Lisa Loch, who was ridiculed during some shows through Raab's assertion that her name ("Loch" meaning "hole" in German) made her more likely to find a job as an actress in pornographic movies. Loch claimed she received anonymous obscene telephone calls, was mocked by classmates and in public and as a result suffered sleeplessness and was afraid to leave her home. A court in Hamm ordered Raab to pay €70,000 in compensation due to infringement of personal rights.
- In an episode broadcast on 6 September 2004, Raab showed a clip, originally destined for a news broadcast, of a 28-year-old Turkish mother Nil S. holding a Schultüte (a cardboard cone, typically full of sweets, traditionally given to children in Germany on their first school day). Raab's comment, "Unbelievable! The drug traffickers are disguising themselves better and better" ("eine Tüte" also means "a marijuana joint" in German slang, hence the pun), resulted in repeated lawsuits, and after a Munich court ruled against Raab, Nil S. settled for €20,000 compensation accompanied by a written apology.

== TV shows ==
=== As host ===
- 1993–1998: Vivasion, VIVA
- 1995–1996: Ma' kuck'n, VIVA
- 1999–2015: TV total, ProSieben
- 2005–2015: Bundesvision Song Contest, ProSieben
- 2009, 2014–2015: Schlag den Star, ProSieben
- 2011: Eurovision Song Contest, ARD
- 2012–2013: TV total Quizboxen, ProSieben
- 2012–2013: Absolute Mehrheit, ProSieben
- 2013: Das TV-Duell – Merkel gegen Steinbrück, ProSieben
- 2024–2025: Du gewinnst hier nicht die Million bei Stefan Raab, RTL+
- 2025–present: Die Stefan Raab Show, RTL
- 2026–present: Wer weiß wie wann was war?, RTL

=== As candidate ===
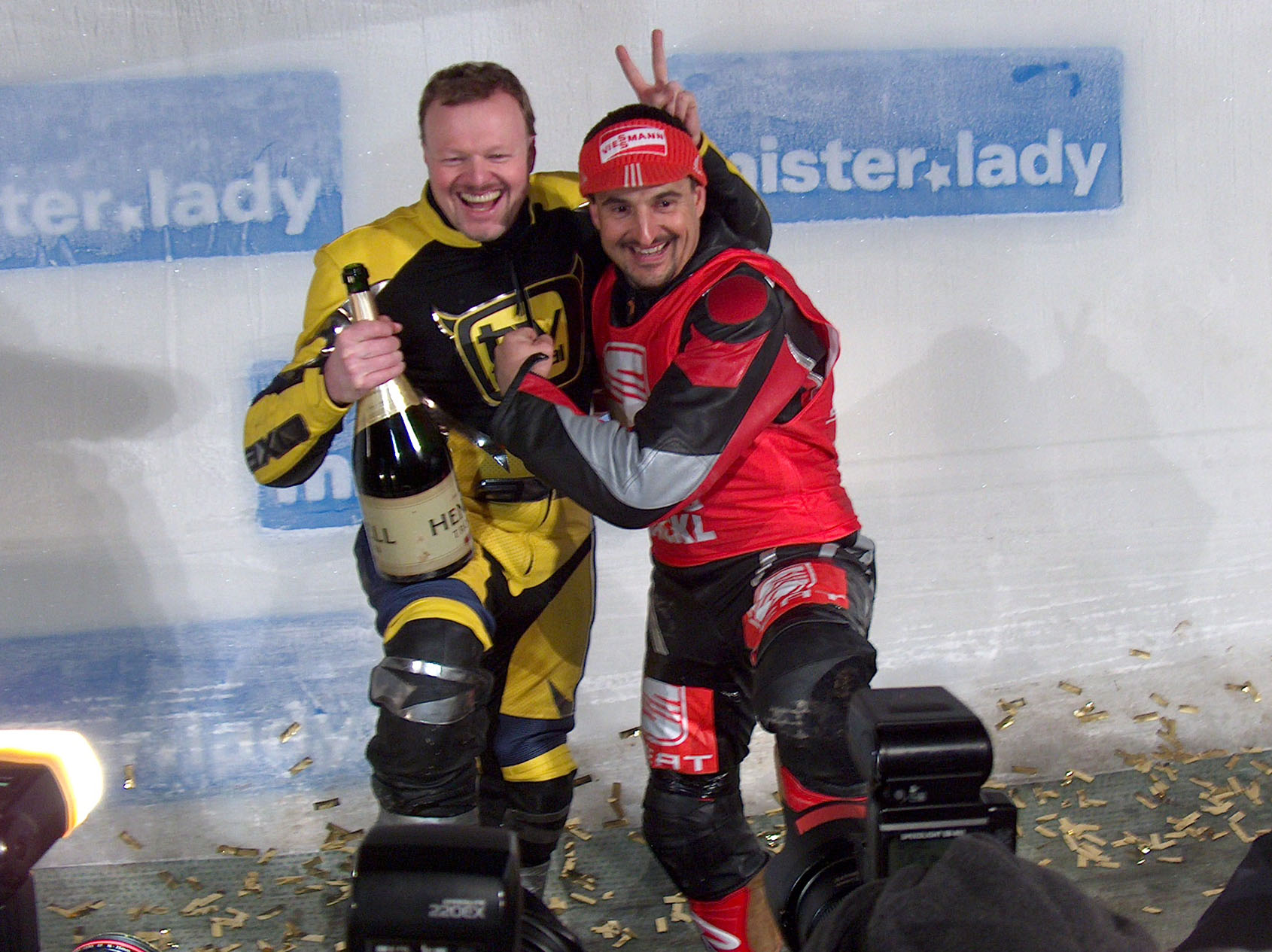
Raab and Georg Hackl after the 2008 Wok world championship

- 2003–2015: TV total Wok-WM, ProSieben
- 2004–2015: TV total Turmspringen, ProSieben
- 2005–2015: TV total Stock Car Crash Challenge, ProSieben
- 2006–2015: Schlag den Raab, ProSieben
- 2008–2014: TV total Autoball, ProSieben
- 2009–2015: Deutscher Eisfußball-Pokal, ProSieben
- 2024–present: Stefan & Bully gegen irgendson Schnulli, RTL
- 2025–present: Raabs Pokernacht mit GGPoker.de, RTL
- 2025–present: Die Unzerquizbaren, RTL
- 2026: Jetski Star WM, RTL

=== As producer ===
- 2009–2024: Schlag den Star, ProSieben
- 2009: Unser Star für Oslo, ARD/ProSieben
- 2010: Unser Song für Deutschland, ARD/ProSieben
- 2011: Unser Star für Baku, ARD/ProSieben
- 2018–2024: Das Ding des Jahres, ProSieben
- 2019: Headis Team-WM, ProSieben
- 2019–2024: 1:30, ProSieben
- 2019–2024: Schlag den Besten, ProSieben
- 2020–2024: Free European Song Contest, ProSieben
- 2024–2025: Du gewinnst hier nicht die Million bei Stefan Raab, RTL
- 2024–present: Eltons 12, RTL
- 2024–present: Stefan & Bully gegen irgendson Schnulli, RTL
- 2025: Chefsache ESC 2025 – Wer singt für Deutschland? , RTL / NDR
- 2025–present: Raabs Pokernacht mit GGPoker.de
- 2025–present: Die Stefan Raab Show, RTL
- 2025–present: Die Unzerquizbaren, RTL
- 2026–present: Wer weiß wie wann was war?, RTL
- 2026: Jetski Star WM, RTL

== Awards ==
For his television show Vivasion, Raab received the Goldener Löwe (Golden Lion), the predecessor to Deutscher Fernsehpreis (German Television Award), in 1996. For TV total he received the Deutscher Fernsehpreis in 1999 as well as the comedy award Rose d'or in 2001.

For his talent show SSDSGPS he was awarded the Adolf-Grimme-Preis in 2005 in for the "discovery and support of young music talents". On 29 May 2005, Raab received the Deutsch-Türkischer Freundschaftspreis (German-Turkish Friendship Award) for his TV total specials from Istanbul in preparation for the Eurovision Song Contest 2004. He won the Bravo Otto in the category "Comedystar" from 2000 to 2003. In 2000 and 2005, Raab was awarded the ECHO (German music award) as "Best National Producer". In 2005, he also received the ECHO award as "media partner of the year").

On 29 September 2007, Raab received the Deutscher Fernsehpreis for "Best Entertainment Show" for the fifth episode of Schlag den Raab. On 6 February 2008, the show was awarded the Goldene Kamera (Golden Camera). Furthermore, Raab received the media award Bambi on 27 November 2008. In 2009, Raab won the Herbert Award 2009 for Best Television Sports show for TV total Turmspringen.

Madame Tussauds in Berlin has displayed a wax figure of Raab since April 2009.

As the initiator and president of the jury of the show Unser Star für Oslo, Raab was awarded the Bavarian TV Award in 2010.

On 12 November 2011, Raab came second in synchronised diving, teaming with Elton in Munich, at the TV Total Turmspringen 2011 event. This was his first ever podium along with Elton at this event.

For his television show Wer weiß wie wann was war?, Raab received the Deutscher Fernsehpreis for "Best Entertainment Show" in 2026.

Awards and achievements
Preceded by Sürpriz with Reise nach Jerusalem - Kudüs'e seyahat	Germany in the Eurovision Song Contest; 2000	Succeeded by Michelle with Wer Liebe lebt
Preceded by (Norway) Nadia Hasnaoui, Haddy N'jie and Erik Solbakken	Eurovision Song Contest presenter 2011; With: Anke Engelke and Judith Rakers	Succeeded by (Azerbaijan) Leyla Aliyeva, Nargiz Berk-Petersen and Eldar Gasimov
