= Brigitte Oelke =

Swiss singer, actress, and dancer

Brigitte Oelke (born c. 25 May 1975 in St. Gallen) is a Swiss singer, actress, and dancer.

== Vita ==
Brigitte Oelke's affection for music started very early in her life. Her mother was the leader of the children's choir at the St. Gallen Stadttheater, in which Oelke took part herself.

Furthermore, she learnt to play multiple instruments (piano, accordion, guitar and the recorder) but nevertheless, singing was her greatest passion.

A friend of the family, Prof. Kurt Pahlen contributed to Oelke's high-class musical education.

During her education as commercial clerk she gained experience as a front woman, for instance in her first band Sterling oder Nightgambler with which she toured Switzerland.

After completing her education at the age of 19 she spent a year as an au pair in Los Angeles where she received an education in singing, Jazz and Stepdance. Back in Europe she also received private tutoring in singing and acting in St. Gallen, Vienna and Bregenz before she entered the Stage School of Music, Dance and Drama in Hamburg, leaving it as a graduate actress.

== Work ==
1997 she worked with Roman Polanski and Jim Steinman at the world premiere of Tanz der Vampire (Dance of the Vampires) in Vienna as a member of the ensemble and alternate "Rebecca".

In 1998 she played Nellie in director Dietrich Hilsdorf's German premiere of Jekyll & Hyde.

November 2000 she won the contest to be one of three candidates to sing the Swiss contribution to the German preliminaries for the European Song Contest 2001– together with Leslie Bogaert and Joy Fleming she performed the song "Power of Trust" making second place.

From December 2004 to October 2006 she got the chance to work in the German production of We Will Rock You alongside her teenage idols Brian May and Roger Taylor, playing the role of "Killer Queen". In December 2006 she moved to Zurich, Switzerland with the production of WWRY and on 24 January 2008 she conquered the third German speaking country–Vienna, Austria. Oelke currently continues her trail of success as "Killer Queen" at the Apollo Theater in Stuttgart, Germany.

=== Engagements ===
- 1994 Lorca's Escapada–"Yerma" (Theatron Hamburg)
- 1994 Into the Woods–"Hexe" (Amerika-Haus Hamburg)
- 1994 La Cage aux Folles–"Madame Dindon", "Jacqueline" (Delphi-Theater Hamburg)
- 1995 Grease–"Jan" (Imperial-Theater Hamburg)
- 1995 West Side Story–"Anita" (Oper/Musikal. Komödie Leipzig)
- 1996 Sweet Charity–"Nicky" (St.-Pauli-Theater Hamburg)
- 1996 Dames at Sea–"Joan" (Delphi-Theater Hamburg)
- 1996 Die Schöne und das Biest–"Mathilde" (Tournee D/CH/A, BB-Promotion)
- 1997 Der kleine Horrorladen–"Crystal" (TheaterZelt Das Schloss München)
- 1997 Tanz der Vampire–"Rebecca", Ensemble (Raimund-Theater Wien)
- 1998 Rock it!–Solistin (Seebühne Zell am See)
- 1998 Jekyll & Hyde–"Nellie" (Musical-Theater Bremen)
- 2000 Beatlemania–Solistin (Seebühne Zell am See)
- 2000 Evita–"Evita" (Städtische Bühnen Münster)
- 2002 West Side Story–"Anita" (Theater Bielefeld)
- 2002 Jesus Christ Superstar–"Maria Magdalena" (Städtische Bühnen Münster)
- 2003 Jekyll & Hyde–"Nellie" (Musical-Dome Köln)
- 2003 Cabaret–"Sally" (Städtische Bühnen Münster)
- 2003 Das Mädchen Rosemarie–"Lilly" (Capitol Theater Düsseldorf)
- 2004 West Side Story–"Anita" (Deutsche Oper am Rhein Düsseldorf)
- 2004 Die Tenoritas–Solistin (Gala-Auftritte Hamburg, Hannover, Bonn)
- 2004 We Will Rock You–"Killer Queen" (Musical-Dome Köln)
- 2006 We Will Rock You–"Killer Queen" (Theater 11, Zürich)
- 2008 We Will Rock You–"Killer Queen" (Raimund-Theater, Wien)
- 2008 We Will Rock You – "Killer Queen" (Apollo Theater, Stuttgart)

=== Discography ===
- 1995 Solo artist auf Lace and chains Giacopuzzi CH (Jazz-Soul-Pop)
- 1996 Solo artist – International Country Hits Barry Lane Compilation
- 1997 Musical-CD Tanz der Vampire –Ensemble (Weltpremiere Cast)
- 1999 Musical-CD Jekyll & Hyde–"Nellie" (Deutsche Erstaufführung)
- 2001 Single Maxi-CD Power of trust–Lesley, Joy & Brigitte (Eurovision Song Contest)
- 2003 Solo artist auf Doppel-Live-CD Musikalisches Feuerwerk (Schweiz)
- 2003 Musical on Ice-CD Romeo und Julia –"Lady Montague“
- 2004 Solo artist – David Plate's The Perception
- 2004 Musical-CD Das Mädchen Rosemarie –"Lilly" (World Premiere Cast)
- 2005 Musical-Live-CD We will Rock You live –"Killer Queen" (Original Cologne Cast)
