= Romania in the Eurovision Song Contest 2004 =

- Eurovision Song Contest 2004
- Participating broadcaster: Televiziunea Română (TVR)
- Country: Romania
- Selection process: Selecția Națională 2004
- Selection date: 13 March 2004

Competing entry
- Song: "I Admit"
- Artist: Sanda
- Songwriters: George Popa; Irina Gligor

Placement
- Final result: 18th, 18 points

Participation chronology

Romania was represented at the Eurovision Song Contest 2004 with the song "I Admit", composed by George Popa, with lyrics by Irina Gligor, and performed by Sanda. The Romanian participating broadcaster, Televiziunea Română (TVR), organised the national final Selecția Națională 2004 in order to select its entry for the contest. The national final consisted of three shows: two semi-finals on 28 February and 6 March 2004, respectively, and a final on 13 March 2004. A total of twenty-three entries were selected and six were selected to advance to the final from each semi-final. The twelve qualifiers competed in the final where "I Admit" performed by Sanda was selected as the winner after scoring top marks from a seven-member jury panel and a public televote.

As one of ten highest placed finishers in the 2003 contest Romania directly qualified to compete in the final of the Eurovision Song Contest which took place on 15 May 2004. Performing in position 23, Romania placed eighteenth out of the 24 participating countries with 18 points.

== Background ==
Prior to the 2004 contest, Televiziunea Română (TVR) had participated in the Eurovision Song Contest representing Romania five times since its first entry in 1994. To this point, its highest placing in the contest has been ninth place, achieved in 2002 with the song "Tell Me Why" performed by Monica Anghel and Marcel Pavel. In 2003, "Don't Break My Heart" by Nicola placed 10th in the contest.

As part of its duties as participating broadcaster, TVR organises the selection of its entry in the Eurovision Song Contest and broadcasts the event in the country. The broadcaster has consistently selected its entry through national finals that feature a competition among several artists and songs, a procedure which TVR opted for once again to select its 2004 entry.

== Before Eurovision ==
=== Selecția Națională 2004 ===
Selecția Națională 2004 was the national final organised by TVR in order to select its entry for the Eurovision Song Contest 2004. The competition consisted of three shows: two semi-finals featuring up to twelve songs to be held on 28 February 2004 and 6 March 2004, respectively, and a final featuring twelve songs to be held on 13 March 2004. The broadcaster held all shows at its studios in Bucharest and were televised on România 1 and Romania International.

==== Competing entries ====
TVR opened a submission period for artists and composers to submit their entries between 17 January 2004 and 9 February 2004. The broadcaster received 156 submissions after the submission deadline passed. A five-member expert committee reviewed the received submissions on 12 February 2004 and selected twenty-four entries for the national final. The competing entries were announced on 16 February 2004. The song "Listen to My Heart", written by Mihai Ogăşanu and Claudia Pavel, was later disqualified from the competition after performer Delia did not show up for TVR's video recording of the song.

Artist	Song	Songwriter(s)
Academica	"Uităm să trăim"	Mircea Romcescu, Olimpia Panciu
Adonis	"Believe Me"	Mihai Trăistariu, Tibi Topor, Lazar Cercel
Adrian Enache	"My Love Story"	Nicolae Caragia, Cristina Nicolaescu
Alexandra Ungureanu	"Happy"	Raul Kusak
Andra	"Just a Little Love"	Adrian Romcescu
Avantgarde	"Am fost nebun"	Raymond Vancu, Neculai Andrei
Boema	"Timbrul"	Victor Socaciu
Centru' Civic	"OK, Let's Go!"	Andrei Tudor
Dan Lăzărică	"Crazy in Love"	Daniel Alexandrescu, George Popa, Radu Fornea, Mircea Presel
Elena Cârstea	"Don't Be Afraid"	Cristian Faur, Elena Cârstea
Genius	"Stand By Me"	Oana Vincu, Cezar Halmagean
Hara	"Lovely"	Flavius Buzilă
June	"I Left My Love in Paris"	Anda Daniela Timbala, Mihai Timbala
Maria Radu	"All This Time"	Maria Radu, Emanuel Gheorghe
Moni-K and Provincialii	"Promise Me"	Monica Mândrescu, Provincialii, Ionuţ Ungureanu
Nico	"Feeling Snow White"	Laurențiu Matei, Ana Maria Mirică
Parlament	"Tot pe ea"	Parlament
Paula Seling	"Perfect!"	Paula Seling, Ștefan Mihăilescu
Salamandra	"Într-o zi"	Andrei Kerestely, Cătălin Dancu
Sanda Ladoși	"I Admit"	George Popa, Irina Gligor
Shake	"Music"	George Popa, Irina Gligor
Silvia Stefanescu	"Rain"	Silvia Stefanescu, Călin Ionce
Supermarket	"De 2 ore te aştept"	Dan Tudor

==== Semi-finals ====
The two semi-finals took place on 28 February and 6 March 2004. The first semi-final which featured twelve competing songs was hosted by Mălina Olinescu (who represented Romania in 1998) and Dan Teodorescu (who represented Romania in 2000 as part of Taxi), while the second semi-final which featured eleven competing songs was hosted by Monica Anghel and Marcel Pavel (who both represented Romania in 2002), joined by Cătălin Măruță and Alina Sorescu who both hosted segments from the green room. In each semi-final six entries qualified to the final based on the 50/50 combination of the votes from a seven-member jury panel and public televoting. The members of the jury panel that voted during the semi-finals were: Mircea Drăgan, Viorel Gavrilă, Andrei Partoș, Eugen Mihăescu, Mihai Pocorschi, Irina Radu and Robert Anghelescu.

Semi-final 1 – 28 February 2004
R/O	Artist	Song	Jury	Televote	Total	Place
1	Moni-K and Provincialii	"Promise Me"	2	0	2	12
2	Adonis	"Believe Me"	1	2	3	10
3	Sanda Ladoși	"I Admit"	8	12	20	1
4	Boema	"Timbrul"	3	1	4	8
5	Andra	"Just a Little Love"	10	10	20	1
6	Silvia Stefanescu	"Rain"	0	4	4	8
7	Nico	"Feeling Snow White"	6	8	14	4
8	June	"I Left My Love in Paris"	0	3	3	10
9	Salamandra	"Într-o zi"	7	7	14	4
10	Avantgarde	"Am fost nebun"	5	0	5	7
11	Alexandra Ungureanu	"Happy"	4	6	10	6
12	Parlament	"Tot pe ea"	12	5	17	3

Semi-final 2 – 6 March 2004
R/O	Artist	Song	Jury	Televote	Total	Place
1	Academica	"Uităm să trăim"	8	0	8	7
2	Dan Lăzărică	"Crazy in Love"	0	4	4	10
3	Centru' Civic	"OK, Let's Go!"	7	1	8	7
4	Paula Seling	"Perfect!"	6	6	12	3
5	Adrian Enache	"My Love Story"	4	2	6	9
6	Shake	"Music"	5	5	10	4
7	Maria Radu	"All This Time"	10	12	22	1
8	Elena Cârstea	"Don't Be Afraid"	12	10	22	1
9	Genius	"Stand By Me"	1	3	4	10
10	Supermarket	"De 2 ore te aştept"	2	8	10	4
11	Hara	"Lovely"	3	7	10	4

==== Final ====
The final took place on 13 March 2004, hosted by Dan Teodorescu (who represented Romania in 2000 as part of Taxi) and Nicola (who represented Romania in 2003) with Cătălin Măruță and Alina Sorescu hosting segments from the green room. Twelve songs competed and the winner, "I Admit" performed by Sanda Ladoși, was determined by the 50/50 combination of the votes from a seven-member jury panel and public televoting. Ladoși won the jury vote as well as the televote with 4,994 votes. The members of the jury panel that voted in the final were: Irina Radu, Andrei Partoș, Mirela Fugaru, Mihai Alexandru, Laurențiu Duță, Ionel Tudor and Adrian Ordean.

In addition to the performances of the competing entries, the interval acts featured performances from Șerban Huidu and Mihai Găinușă, Dan Bittman (who represented Romania in 1994), Dana International (who won Eurovision for Israel in 1998) and competition hosts Mălina Olinescu, Dan Teodorescu with Taxi, Monica Anghel and Marcel Pavel, and Nicola.

Final – 13 March 2004
R/O	Artist	Song	Jury	Televote	Total	Place
1	Supermarket	"De 2 ore te aştept"	0	0	0	12
2	Nico	"Feeling Snow White"	3	1	4	9
3	Shake	"Music"	1	0	1	11
4	Andra	"Just a Little Love"	10	7	17	2
5	Elena Cârstea	"Don't Be Afraid"	8	8	16	4
6	Paula Seling	"Perfect!"	5	3	8	8
7	Salamandra	"Într-o zi"	6	2	8	6
8	Maria Radu	"All This Time"	7	10	17	3
9	Sanda Ladoși	"I Admit"	12	12	24	1
10	Parlament	"Tot pe ea"	4	5	9	5
11	Alexandra Ungureanu	"Happy"	0	4	4	10
12	Hara	"Lovely"	2	6	8	7

== At Eurovision ==
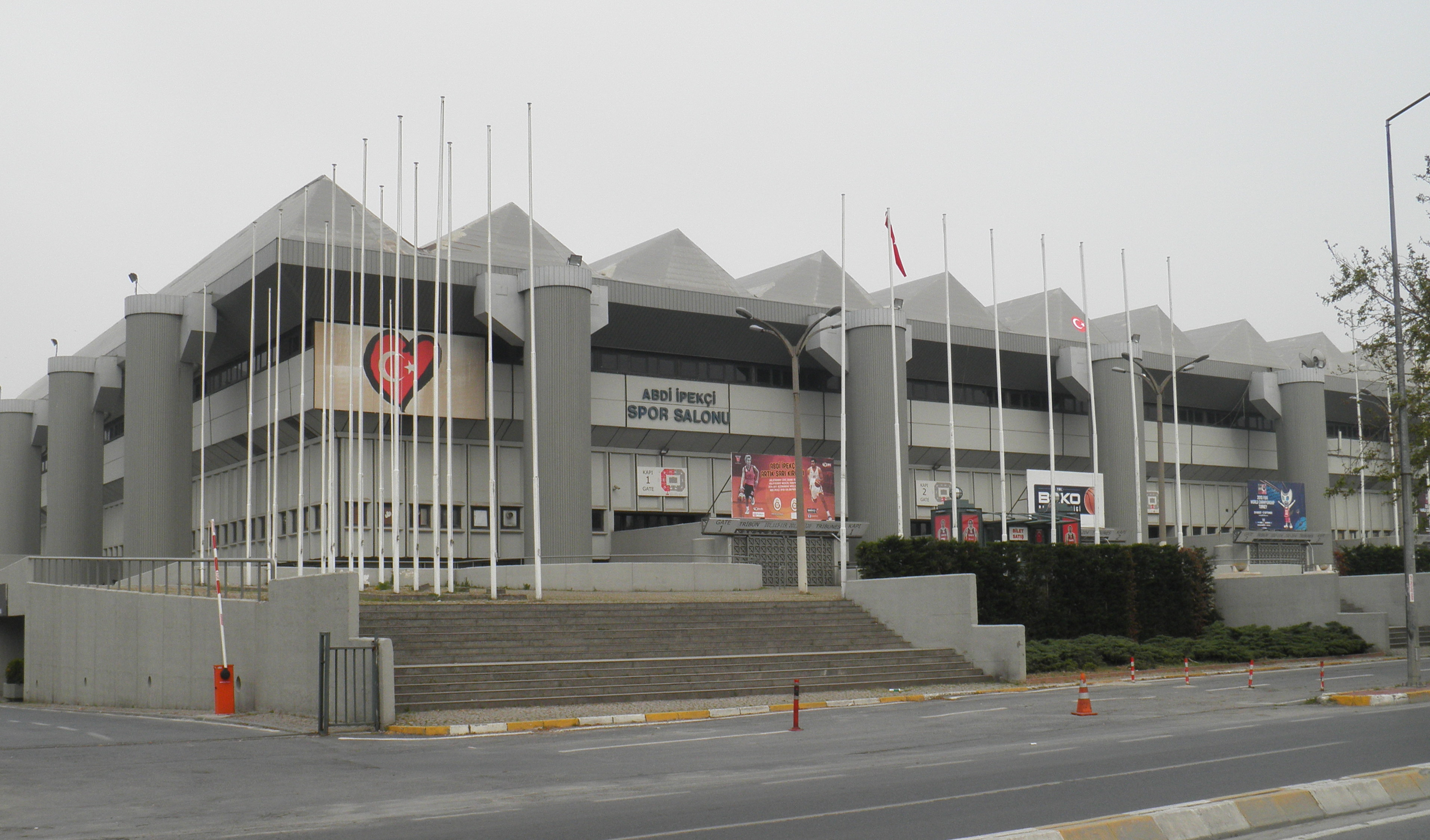
The Eurovision Song Contest 2004 took place at the Abdi İpekçi Arena in Istanbul, Turkey

It was announced that the competition's format would be expanded to include a semi-final in 2004. According to the rules, all nations with the exceptions of the host country, the "Big Four" (France, Germany, Spain, and the United Kingdom) and the ten highest placed finishers in the 2003 contest are required to qualify from the semi-final in order to compete for the final; the top ten countries from the semi-final progress to the final. As Romania finished tenth in the 2003 contest, the nation automatically qualified to compete in the final on 15 May 2004. On 23 March 2004, an allocation draw was held which determined the running order and Romania was set to perform in position 24 in the final, following the entry from Turkey and before the entry from Sweden. Romania placed eighteenth in the final, scoring 18 points.

The two shows were broadcast in Romania on România 1. TVR appointed Andreea Marin as its spokesperson to announce the results of the Romanian televote during the final.

=== Voting ===
Below is a breakdown of points awarded to Romania and awarded by Romania in the semi-final and grand final of the contest. The nation awarded its 12 points to Greece in the semi-final and the final of the contest.

Following the release of the televoting figures by the EBU after the conclusion of the competition, it was revealed that a total of 14,953 televotes were cast in Romania during the two shows: 3,255 votes during the semi-final and 11,698 votes during the final.

==== Points awarded to Romania ====
Points awarded to Romania (Final)
Score	Country
12 points	
10 points	Spain
8 points	
7 points	
6 points	
5 points	
4 points	Portugal
3 points	Cyprus
2 points	
1 point	Israel

==== Points awarded by Romania ====
Points awarded by Romania (Semi-final)
Score	Country
12 points	Greece
10 points	Serbia and Montenegro
8 points	Portugal
7 points	Ukraine
6 points	Albania
5 points	Israel
4 points	Macedonia
3 points	Netherlands
2 points	Denmark
1 point	Cyprus

Points awarded by Romania (Final)
Score	Country
12 points	Greece
10 points	Turkey
8 points	Serbia and Montenegro
7 points	Sweden
6 points	Ukraine
5 points	Spain
4 points	Germany
3 points	Cyprus
2 points	United Kingdom
1 point	Albania
