= Romania in the Eurovision Song Contest 2003 =

- Eurovision Song Contest 2003
- Participating broadcaster: Televiziunea Română (TVR)
- Country: Romania
- Selection process: Selecția Națională 2003
- Selection date: 1 March 2003

Competing entry
- Song: "Don't Break My Heart"
- Artist: Nicola
- Songwriters: Mihai Alexandru; Nicoleta Alexandru

Placement
- Final result: 10th, 73 points

Participation chronology

Romania was represented at the Eurovision Song Contest 2003 with the song "Don't Break My Heart", composed by Mihai Alexandru, with lyrics by Nicoleta Alexandru, and performed by Alexandru herself under her artistic name Nicola. The Romanian participating broadcaster, Televiziunea Română (TVR), selected its entry through the national final Selecția Națională 2003. The national final consisted of three shows: two semi-finals on 15 and 22 February 2003, respectively, and a final on 1 March 2003. A total of twenty-four entries were selected and twelve competed in each semi-final. Ten qualifiers were ultimately selected to compete in the final where "Don't Break My Heart" performed by Nicola was selected as the winner after scoring top marks from a seven-member jury panel and a public televote.

Romania competed in the Eurovision Song Contest which took place on 24 May 2003. Performing during the show in position 24, Romania placed tenth out of the 26 participating countries, scoring 73 points.

== Background ==
Prior to the 2003 contest, Televiziunea Română (TVR) had participated in the Eurovision Song Contest representing Romania four times since its first entry in 1994. To this point, its highest placing in the contest has been ninth place, achieved in 2002 with the song "Tell Me Why" performed by Monica Anghel and Marcel Pavel.

As part of its duties as participating broadcaster, TVR organises the selection of its entry in the Eurovision Song Contest and broadcasts the event in the country. The broadcaster confirmed its intentions to participate at the 2003 contest on 29 May 2002. TVR has consistently selected its entry through national finals that feature a competition among several artists and songs, a procedure which the broadcaster opted for once again to select its 2003 entry.

== Before Eurovision ==
=== Selecția Națională 2003 ===
Selecția Națională 2003 was the national final organised by TVR in order to select its entry for the Eurovision Song Contest 2003. The competition consisted of three shows: two semi-final featuring twelve songs each to be held on 15 and 22 February 2003, respectively, and a final featuring ten songs to be held on 1 March 2003. The broadcaster held all shows at its television studios in Bucharest, hosted by Kitty Cepraga and Leonard Miron and televised on România 1, TVR 2 and Romania International.

==== Competing entries ====
TVR opened a submission period for artists and composers to submit their entries between 15 December 2002 and 17 January 2003. The broadcaster received 233 submissions after the submission deadline passed. Five separate expert committees, consisting of representatives of the written press, radio stations, the Union of Composers and Musicologists, TVR and the public, reviewed the received submissions on 23 January 2002 and selected twenty-four entries for the national final. The competing entries were announced on 25 January 2003. Among the competing artists was Mălina Olinescu, who represented Romania in 1998.

Artist	Song	Songwriter(s)
Alexandra Ungureanu	"Make This Love Come True"	Marius Moga, Andrew Klein
Aurelian Temișan	"Goodbye, Hello, Goodbye"	Nicolae Caragia, Aurelian Temișan
Aurelian Temișan	"Let's Have a Holiday"	Nicolae Caragia, Aurelian Temișan
Bogdan Bradu	"Albastru aprins"	Bogdan Bradu, Zoia Alecu
Centru' Civic	"Come With Us"	Andrei Tudor, Andreea Andrei
Costi Ioniţă	"Dominus"	Constantin Ioniţă, Mihaela Vescali
D'La Vegas	"Oxigen"	Daniel Robu, Silvia Lăuneanu
Desperado	"Fată de la ţară"	Ovidiu Buhățel, László Kovács, Sandy Deac
Genius	"My Life"	Oana Vincu, Cezar Hălmăgean, Ovidiu Hălmăgean
Hara	"Spune"	Marius Buzilă
Krypton	"Lumea noastră"	Eugen Mihăescu
Latin Expres	"Mereu aproape"	Marius Popa
Mălina Olinescu	"Tăcerea doare"	Călin Geambașu, Zoia Alecu
Marius Dragomir	"Golden Bird"	Marius Dragomir
Nicola	"Don't Break My Heart"	Mihai Alexandru, Nicoleta Alexandru
Nicoleta Matei	"The Only One"	Laurențiu Matei, Ana Maria Mirică
Oana Sârbu	"Doar tu știi"	Virgil Popescu, Dumitru Popescu Chiselet
Open	"Tell Me"	Alice Bursuc, Andrei Vlad
Paula Seling	"Let's Go!"	Marius Moga, Andrew Klein
Răzvan Crivaci and Liviu Sorescu	"Once Upon a Time"	Liviu Sorescu, Ina Rachita, Răzvan Crivaci
Selena	"Anytime"	Gheorghe Nagler
Sfinx Experience	"A fost o vreme când"	Crina Mardare, Zoia Alecu
Supermarket	"Un om între oameni"	Vlad Crețu
Valahia	"Friends are Friends"	Mihai Trăistariu, Dorin Topala, Cornel Sighiliu, Octavian Pinu

==== Semi-finals ====
The two semi-finals took place on 15 and 22 February 2003. In each semi-final twelve songs competed and six qualified to the final based on the 50/50 combination of the votes from a seven-member jury panel and public televoting. The members of the jury panel that voted during the semi-finals were: Marcel Dragomir, Monica Anghel, Mihai Pocorschi, Titus Andrei, Andrei Partoș, Petre Magdin, and Mircea Drăgan.

Following the semi-finals, Aurelian Temișan withdrew one of his two songs, "Goodbye, Hello, Goodbye", from the final as he didn't want to split his televotes between both songs, while "Dominus" performed by Costi Ioniţă was disqualified from the final due to claims that it had similarities with the song "Ty prosti" by the Russian group Hi-Fi.

Semi-final 1 – 15 February 2003
R/O	Artist	Song	Jury	Televote	Total	Place
1	Krypton	"Lumea noastră"	2	5	7	8
2	Selena	"Anytime"	0	1	1	12
3	Valahia	"Friends Are Friends"	4	12	16	3
4	Desperado	"Fată de la ţară"	7	0	7	7
5	Nicoleta Matei	"The Only One"	10	6	16	4
6	Răzvan Crivaci and Liviu Sorescu	"Once Upon a Time"	5	3	8	6
7	Aurelian Temișan	"Let's Have a Holiday"	12	7	19	1
8	D'La Vegas	"Oxigen"	3	8	11	5
9	Supermarket	"Un om între oameni"	0	4	4	10
10	Paula Seling	"Let's Go!"	8	10	18	2
11	Marius Dragomir	"Golden Bird"	1	2	3	11
12	Sfinx Experience	"A fost o vreme când"	6	0	6	9

Semi-final 2 – 22 February 2003
R/O	Artist	Song	Jury	Televote	Total	Place
1	Centru' Civic	"Come With Us"	8	5	13	3
2	Mălina Olinescu	"Tăcerea doare"	6	3	9	8
3	Latin Expres	"Mereu aproape"	1	0	1	11
4	~~Aurelian Temișan~~	~~"Goodbye, Hello, Goodbye"~~	~~10~~	~~6~~	~~16~~	~~2~~
5	Genius	"My Life"	7	4	11	6
6	~~Costi Ioniţă~~	~~"Dominus"~~	~~3~~	~~10~~	~~13~~	~~4~~
7	Alexandra Ungureanu	"Make This Love Come True"	4	8	12	5
8	Bogdan Bradu	"Albastru aprins"	5	2	7	9
9	Nicola	"Don't Break My Heart"	12	12	24	1
10	Open	"Tell Me"	0	0	0	12
11	Oana Sârbu	"Doar tu știi"	0	1	1	10
12	Hara	"Spune"	2	7	9	7

==== Final ====
The final took place on 1 March 2003. Ten songs competed and the winner, "Don't Break My Heart" performed by Nicola, was determined by the 50/50 combination of the votes from a seven-member jury panel and public televoting. Nicola won the jury vote with 79 points as well as the televote with 11,113 votes. The members of the jury panel that voted in the final were: Mirela Fugaru, Oltea Șerban-Pârâu, Andrei Kerestely, Gabriel Cotabiță, Paul Enigarescu, Ștefan Elefteriu, and Horia Moculescu.

Final – 1 March 2003
R/O	Artist	Song	Jury	Televote	Total	Place
1	Valahia	"Friends Are Friends"	4	7	11	3
2	D'La Vegas	"Oxigen"	1	4	5	10
3	Nicola	"Don't Break My Heart"	12	12	24	1
4	Genius	"My Life"	8	1	9	6
5	Paula Seling	"Let's Go!"	5	6	11	3
6	Răzvan Crivaci and Liviu Sorescu	"Once Upon a Time"	6	3	9	6
7	Alexandra Ungureanu	"Make This Love Come True"	3	8	11	3
8	Nicoleta Matei	"The Only One"	2	5	7	9
9	Centru' Civic	"Come With Us"	7	2	9	6
10	Aurelian Temișan	"Let's Have a Holiday"	10	10	20	2

== At Eurovision ==
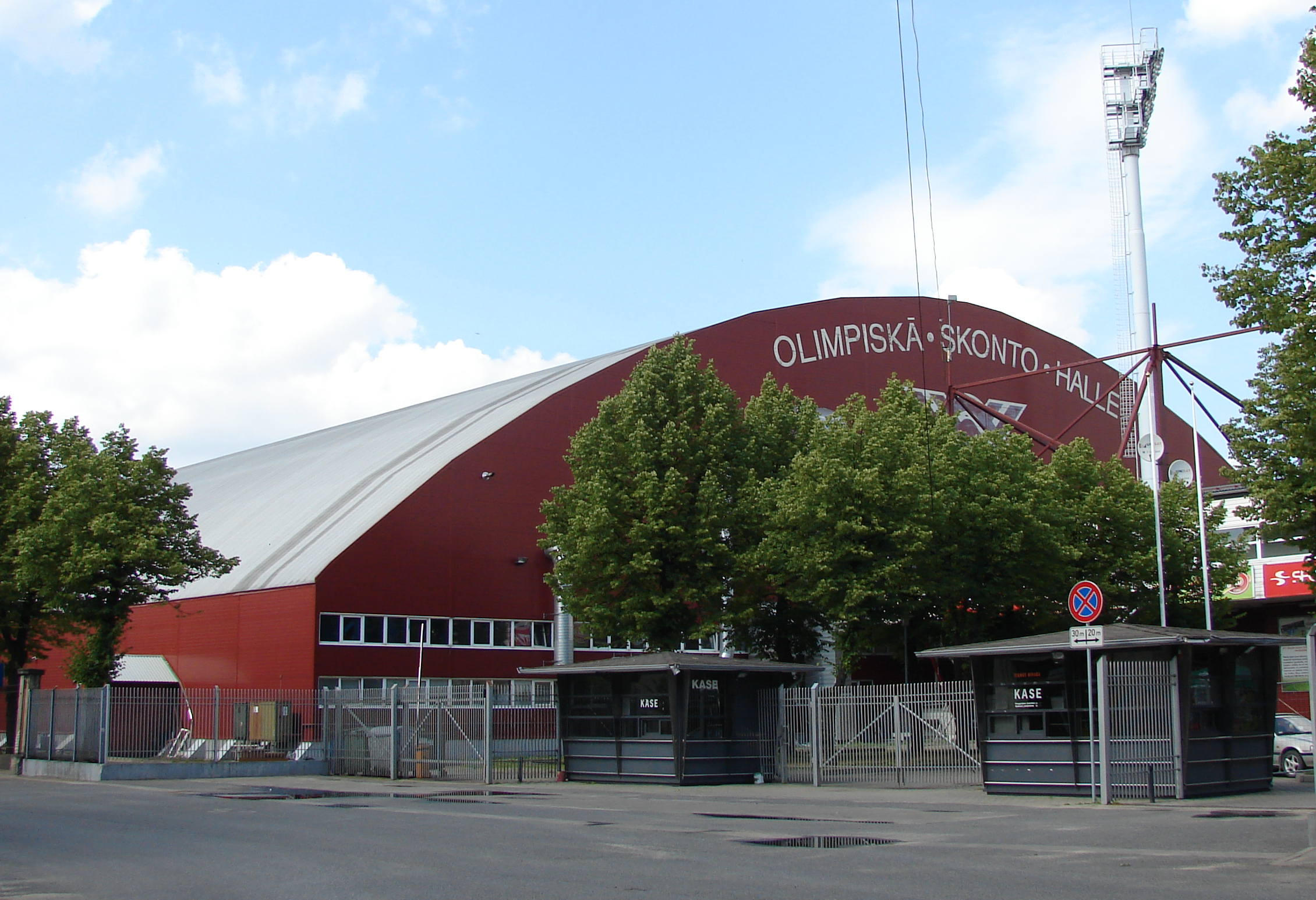
The Eurovision Song Contest 2003 took place at Skonto Hall in Riga, Latvia.

The Eurovision Song Contest 2003 took place at the Skonto Hall in Riga, Latvia, on 24 May 2003. According to the Eurovision rules, the participant list for the contest was composed of: the winning country from the previous year's contest; any countries which had not participated in the previous year's contest; and those which had obtained the highest placing in the previous contest, up to the maximum 26 participants in total. On 29 November 2002, an allocation draw was held which determined the running order and Romania was set to perform in position 24, following the entry from Estonia and before the entry from Sweden. Romania finished in tenth place with 73 points.

The contest was broadcast in Romania on România 1.

=== Voting ===
Below is a breakdown of points awarded to Romania and awarded by Romania in the contest. The nation awarded its 12 points to Sweden in the contest. TVR appointed Leonard Miron as its spokesperson to announce the results of the Romanian televote during the show.

Points awarded to Romania
Score	Country
12 points	Russia
10 points	Spain
8 points	Poland
7 points	Bosnia and Herzegovina
6 points	Austria; Israel; Ukraine
5 points	
4 points	France; Germany; Greece
3 points	
2 points	Cyprus
1 point	Croatia; Norway; Sweden; Turkey

Points awarded by Romania
Score	Country
12 points	Sweden
10 points	Turkey
8 points	Belgium
7 points	Russia
6 points	France
5 points	Spain
4 points	Poland
3 points	Norway
2 points	Greece
1 point	Germany
