= Romania in the Eurovision Song Contest 2002 =

- Eurovision Song Contest 2002
- Participating broadcaster: Televiziunea Română (TVR)
- Country: Romania
- Selection process: Selecția Națională 2002
- Selection date: 3 March 2002

Competing entry
- Song: "Tell Me Why"
- Artist: Monica Anghel and Marcel Pavel
- Songwriters: Ionel Tudor; Mirela Fugaru

Placement
- Final result: 9th, 71 points

Participation chronology

Romania was represented at the Eurovision Song Contest 2002 with the song "Tell Me Why", composed by Ionel Tudor, with lyrics by Mirela Fugaru, and performed by Monica Anghel and Marcel Pavel. The Romanian participating broadcaster, Televiziunea Română (TVR), selected its entry through the national final Selecția Națională 2002. TVR returned to the contest after a one-year absence following their relegation from 2001 as one of the bottom six entrants in the 2000 contest.

Eighteen entries were selected to compete in the national final on 3 March 2002 where "Tell Me Why" performed by Monica Anghel and Marcel Pavel was selected as the winner after scoring top marks from an eight-member jury panel and a public televote.

Romania competed in the Eurovision Song Contest which took place on 25 May 2002. Performing during the show in position 21, Romania placed ninth out of the 24 participating countries, scoring 71 points.

== Background ==
Prior to the 2002 contest, Televiziunea Română (TVR) had participated in the Eurovision Song Contest representing Romania three times since its first entry in 1994. To this point, its highest placing in the contest has been 17th place, achieved in 2000 with the song "The Moon" performed by Taxi.

As part of its duties as participating broadcaster, TVR organises the selection of its entry in the Eurovision Song Contest and broadcasts the event in the country. The broadcaster has consistently selected its entry through national finals that feature a competition among several artists and songs, a procedure which the broadcaster opted for once again to select its 2002 entry.

== Before Eurovision ==
=== Selecția Națională 2002 ===
Selecția Națională 2002 was the national final organised by TVR in order to select its entry for the Eurovision Song Contest 2002. The broadcaster held the competition at its television studios in Bucharest on 3 March 2002, hosted by Leonard Miron. The show was televised on România 1 and România Internațional.

==== Competing entries ====
TVR opened a submission period for artists and composers to submit their entries between 8 January 2002 and 10 February 2002. The broadcaster received 165 submissions after the submission deadline passed. Five separate expert committees, consisting of representatives of the written press, radio stations, the Union of Composers and Musicologists, TVR and the public, reviewed the received submissions on 14 February 2002 and selected eighteen entries for the national final. The competing entries were announced on 15 February 2002.

Artist	Song	Songwriter(s)
Alina Sorescu	"You Know It"	Dani Constantin, Mihaela Calinescu
B Brothers	"Together as One"	Mircea Badiu, Alexandru Badiu
Candy and Gaz pe Foc	"Spune-mi"	Liviu Tudan, Dinu Olăraşu
Class	"Povestea unei mingi"	Mihaela Cernea, Vlad Cernea, Florin Cojocaru, Anca Badiu
Kappa	"Frunză"	Ovidiu Buhățel, László Kovács, Alexandru Deac
Krypton	"Ce vrăji mi-ai făcut"	Eugen Mihăescu
Luminiţa Anghel	"All I Want"	Sorin Vasile, Luminiţa Anghel
Monica Anghel and Marcel Pavel	"Tell Me Why"	Ionel Tudor, Mirela Fugaru
Nicola	"I Do"	Mihai Alexandru, Nicoleta Alexandru
No Comment	"Liberi"	Călin Geambașu, Xenti Runceanu, Liliana Ştefan
Pro Consul	"Mama Terra"	Robert Anghelescu, Bogdan Marin
Quartz	"Fluier"	Amedeo Bolohoi, Gianina Corondan
Sfinx Experience	"Dacă vrei, poţi"	Sfinx Experience
Sfinx Experience and Laurenţiu Niculescu	"Vino-n somnul meu"	Sfinx Experience
Spitalul de Urgență	"Ea"	Dan Helciug
Valahia	"Mama"	Marius Băraș, Mihai Trăistariu, Dorin Topala
Vank	"All Too Young"	Cornel Ilie, Nicu Sârghea, Alex Belciu, Victor Cenușa
Voltaj	"Lacrima"	Călin Goia, Bobby Stoica, Gabi Constantin, Vali Ionescu, Paul Neacșu

==== Final ====
The final took place on 3 March 2002. Eighteen songs competed and the winner, "Tell Me Why" performed by Monica Anghel and Marcel Pavel, was determined by the 50/50 combination of the votes from an eight-member jury panel and public televoting.

Final – 3 March 2002
R/O	Artist	Song	Jury		Televote		Total	Place
R/O	Artist	Song	Votes	Points	Votes	Points	Total	Place
1	B Brothers	"Together as One"	15	0	2,282	2	2	14
2	Krypton	"Ce vrăji mi-ai făcut"	30	3	1,582	0	3	11
3	Alina Sorescu	"You Know It"	17	0	2,302	3	3	12
4	Vank	"All Too Young"	51	10	2,867	5	15	2
5	Nicola	"I Do"	38	6	2,334	4	10	5
6	Sfinx Experience	"Dacă vrei, poţi"	33	5	809	0	5	10
7	Spitalul de Urgență	"Ea"	72	12	1,565	0	12	3
8	Kappa	"Frunză"	29	2	2,261	1	3	13
9	Pro Consul	"Mama Terra"	44	8	1,237	0	8	7
10	Quartz	"Fluier"	10	0	975	0	0	15
11	Valahia	"Mama"	19	1	6,142	10	11	4
12	Sfinx Experience and Laurenţiu Niculescu	"Vino-n somnul meu"	11	0	842	0	0	16
13	Voltaj	"Lacrima"	8	0	3,493	7	7	9
14	Class	"Povestea unei mingi"	1	0	638	0	0	17
15	Monica Anghel and Marcel Pavel	"Tell Me Why"	43	7	6,854	12	19	1
16	Luminiţa Anghel	"All I Want"	31	4	3,248	6	10	6
17	Candy and Gaz pe Foc	"Spune-mi"	14	0	3,950	8	8	8
18	No Comment	"Liberi"	18	0	906	0	0	18

== At Eurovision ==
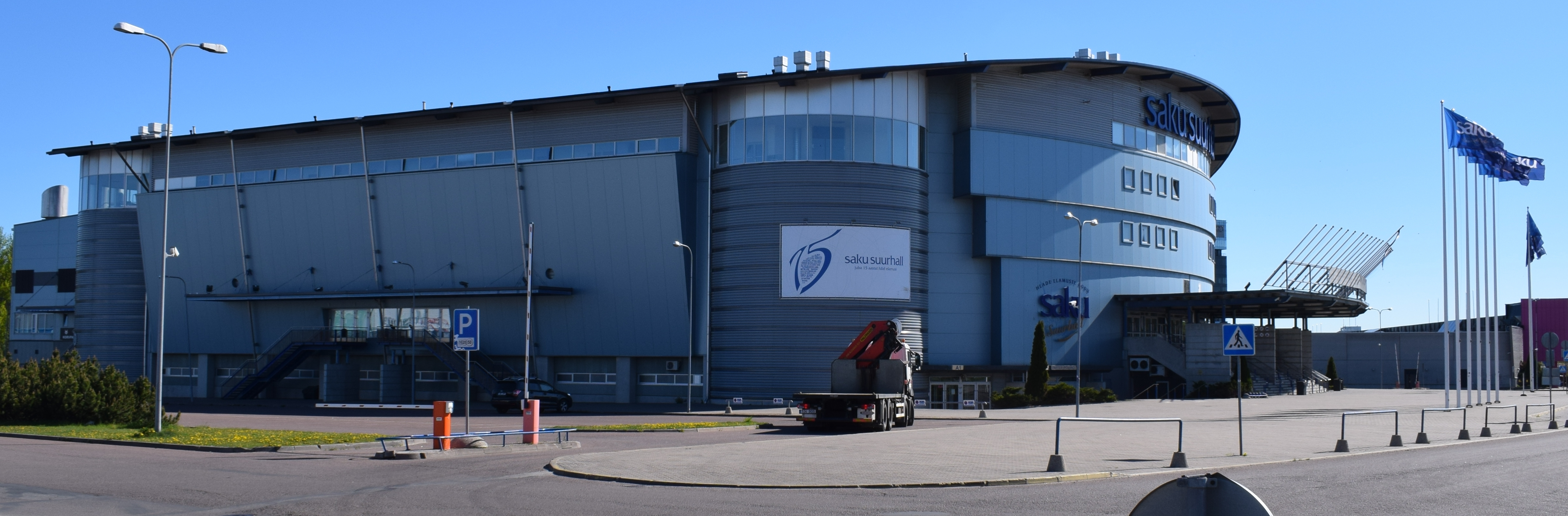
The Eurovision Song Contest 2002 took place at Saku Suurhall in Tallinn, Estonia.

The Eurovision Song Contest 2002 took place at Saku Suurhall in Tallinn, Estonia, on 25 May 2002. The participants list included the previous year's winning country, the "Big Four" countries, consisting of France, Germany, Spain and the United Kingdom, any eligible countries which did not compete in the 2001 contest, and countries which had obtained the highest average points total at the previous year's contest, up to 24 total participants. In 2002, Romania automatically qualified to the final due to their relegation in the previous year. On 9 November 2001, an allocation draw was held which determined the running order and Romania was set to perform in position 21, following the entry from Malta and before the entry from Slovenia.

The contest was broadcast in Romania on România 1.

=== Voting ===
Below is a breakdown of points awarded to Romania and awarded by Romania in the contest. The nation awarded its 12 points to Macedonia in the contest. TVR appointed Leonard Miron as its spokesperson to announce the votes of the Romanian jury during the show.

Points awarded to Romania
Score	Country
12 points	Macedonia; Russia
10 points	
8 points	Cyprus; Greece; Israel
7 points	Turkey
6 points	Malta
5 points	Spain
4 points	France
3 points	
2 points	
1 point	Germany

Points awarded by Romania
Score	Country
12 points	Macedonia
10 points	Russia
8 points	Cyprus
7 points	Turkey
6 points	Greece
5 points	Israel
4 points	France
3 points	Switzerland
2 points	Estonia
1 point	Germany
