= Tell Me Why (Monica Anghel and Marcel Pavel song) =

2002 single by Monica Anghel and Marcel Pavel

Single by Monica Anghel and Marcel Pavel
- Released: 2002
- Length: 2:46
- Label: Transglobal EMI
- Songwriter(s): Mirela Fugaru
- Producer(s): Ionel Tudor

Eurovision Song Contest 2002 entry
- Country: Romania
- Artist(s): Monica Anghel and Marcel Pavel
- Language: English
- Composer(s): Mirela Fugaru
- Lyricist(s): Mirela Fugaru

Finals performance
- Final result: 9th
- Final points: 71

Entry chronology
- ◄ "The Moon" (2001)
- "Don't Break My Heart" (2003) ►

"Tell Me Why" is a song recorded by Romanian singers Monica Anghel and Marcel Pavel. It was recorded at the Midi Sound Studio in Bucharest, and was released as a CD single in 2002 by Transglobal EMI. A ballad, "Tell Me Why" was written by Mirela Fugaru and produced by Ionel Tudor, containing a saxophone, guitar and keyboards in its instrumentation. The track represented Romania in the Eurovision Song Contest 2002 in Tallinn, Estonia after winning the pre-selection show Selecția Națională. In Tallinn, the artists finished in ninth place with 71 points. This remained Romania's best result until 2005 and qualified the country for the contest's next edition.

== Background and release ==
A ballad, "Tell Me Why" was written by Mirela Fugar and produced by Ionel Tudor. It was recorded and mixed at the Midi Sound Studio in Bucharest, Romania by Andrei Kerestely. The song featured several instruments in its composition, including guitar played by Cezar Zavate, saxophone by Alexandru Simu and keyboards by Andrei Tudor. A CD of "Tell Me Why" was released in 2002 by Transglobal EMI, with its cover designed and photographed by PromArt, Mihai Stanescu and Liviu Marchidan.

== At Eurovision ==
On 3 March 2002, the Selecția Națională was held in order to select the Romanian entrant for the Eurovision Song Contest 2002. Subsequently, "Tell Me Why" was chosen to represent Romania in the contest after the votes of a professional jury panel and public televoting were combined, resulting in 19 points. Sietse Bakker from EscToday praised the artists as having the best voices in the show. In a 2010 interview with Adevărul, Anghel said: "It was both my idea and Marcel Pavel's to record a song together for Eurovision and it seemed an extraordinary idea because the Romanian audience loves us. [...] Basically, we have won [the national selection] thanks to the audience. They expressed their wish that we should participate." Both Pavel and Anghel took part in the national selection in previous years. Selected as the Romanian entrant for Eurovision in 1996 with her song "Rugă pentru pacea lumii", the latter failed to qualify for the Grand Final that year.

The Eurovision Song Contest 2002 took place at the Saku Suurhall in Tallinn, Estonia and consisted of the final on 25 May 2002. According to the Eurovision rules at the time, selected countries were picked to participate in the final, including the host country and the "Big Four" (France, Germany, Spain and the United Kingdom). In 2002, Romania automatically qualified to the final due to their relegation in the previous year. Thus, Anghel and Pavel performed in 21st place, preceded by Malta and followed by Slovenia. During their show, the artists sang "Tell Me Why" in front of a turquoise background, with Anghel wearing a black dress and Pavel sporting a suit. Romania came in ninth place with 71 points, including 12 awarded by Russia and Macedonia, and eight by Israel, Greece and Cyprus. The Romanian jury awarded its 12 points to Macedonia. Due to the top 10 result, the country was qualified in the 2003 contest. It remained Romania's best placement until 2005.

=== Results ===
Points awarded to Romania
Score	Country
12 points	Macedonia; Russia
10 points	
8 points	Cyprus; Greece; Israel
7 points	Turkey
6 points	Malta
5 points	Spain
4 points	France
3 points	
2 points	
1 point	Germany

== Track listing ==
- Romanian CD single
1. "Tell Me Why" (Full Vocal Mix) – 2:46
2. "Tell Me Why" (Instrumental) – 2:46

== Credits and personnel ==
Credits adapted from the liner notes of the CD single.

=== Management ===
- Published by Transglobal EMI
- Recorded and mixed at Midi Sound Studio (Bucharest, Romania)

=== Personnel ===
- Monica Anghel – lead vocals
- Marcel Pavel – lead vocals
- Mirela Fugaru – composer
- Andrei Kerestely – mixing
- Alexandru Simu – saxophone
- Andrei Tudor – keyboards
- Ionel Tudor – producer
- Cezar Zavate – guitar

== Release history ==
Country	Date	Format	Label
Romania	N/A 2002	Promotional CD single	Transglobal EMI
