= Estonia in the Eurovision Song Contest 2002 =

- Eurovision Song Contest 2002
- Participating broadcaster: Eesti Televisioon (ETV)
- Country: Estonia
- Selection process: Eurolaul 2002
- Selection date: 26 January 2002

Competing entry
- Song: "Runaway"
- Artist: Sahlene
- Songwriters: Pearu Paulus; Ilmar Laisaar; Alar Kotkas; Jana Hallas

Placement
- Final result: 3rd, 111 points

Participation chronology

Estonia was represented at the Eurovision Song Contest 2002 with the song "Runaway", written by Pearu Paulus, Ilmar Laisaar, Alar Kotkas, and Jana Hallas and performed by Sahlene. The Estonian participating broadcaster, Eesti Televisioon (ETV) organised the national final Eurolaul 2002 in order to select its entry for the contest. In addition, ETV was also the host broadcaster and staged the event at the Saku Suurhall in Tallinn, after winning the previous edition with the song "Everybody" performed by Tanel Padar, Dave Benton, and 2XL.

Ten songs competed in the national final and "Runaway" performed by Sahlene was selected as the winner by an international jury panel. As the host country, Estonia competed in the Eurovision Song Contest which took place on 25 May 2002. Performing during the show in position 8, Estonia placed third out of the 24 participating countries with 111 points.

== Background ==
Prior to the 2002 Contest, Eesti Televisioon (ETV) had participated in the Eurovision Song Contest representing Estonia seven times since its first entry in 1994, winning the contest on one occasion: in 2001 with the song "Everybody" performed by Tanel Padar, Dave Benton and 2XL.

As part of its duties as participating broadcaster, ETV organises the selection of its entry in the Eurovision Song Contest and broadcasts the event in the country. Since its debut, the Estonian broadcaster has organised national finals that feature a competition among multiple artists and songs in order to select its entry for the contest. The Eurolaul competition has been organised since 1996 in order to select its entry, and on 6 November 2001, ETV announced the organisation of Eurolaul 2002 in order to select its 2002 entry.

== Before Eurovision ==
=== Eurolaul 2002 ===
Eurolaul 2002 was the ninth edition of the Estonian national selection Eurolaul, which selected the Estonian entry for the Eurovision Song Contest 2002. The competition consisted of a ten-song final on 26 January 2002 at the Linnahall in Tallinn, hosted by Marko Reikop and Karmel Eikner and broadcast on ETV.

==== Competing entries ====
On 6 November 2001, ETV opened the submission period for artists and composers to submit their entries up until 3 December 2001. A record 90 submissions were received by the deadline—breaking the previous record of 80, set during the 2001 edition. A 10-member jury panel selected 10 finalists from the submissions and the selected songs were announced on 6 December 2001. Among the competing artists was previous Eurovision Song Contest entrant Ivo Linna, who represented Estonia in the 1996 contest with Maarja-Liis Ilus. Gerli Padar has competed in previous editions of Eurolaul. The selection jury consisted of Meelis Kapstas (journalist), Jaan Elgula (musician), Jaan Karp (musician), Priit Hõbemägi (culture critic), Allan Roosileht (Raadio 2 music editor), Aarne Saluveer (choir conductor), Maido Maadik (Eesti Raadio sound engineer), Hanna-Liina Võsa (singer), Karmel Eikner (journalist) and Priit Pajusaar (composer).

Artist	Song	Songwriter(s)
Gerli Padar	"Need a Little Nothing"	Jeanette Olsson, Tracy Lipp, Maki Kolehmainen
Hatuna and Riina Riistop	"This Is (What Luv Can Do)"	Hakan Björklund, Peter Ross
Jaanika Vilipo	"I'm Falling"	Kadri Sakala, Marko Tooming
Julia Hillens	"U Can't"	Peter Ross
Lea Liitmaa and Jaagup Kreem	"What If I Fell"	William Vesilind, Jaagup Kreem, Elmar Liitmaa
Maarja Kivi	"A Dream"	Kärt Tomingas, Raid Liiver
Maarja Tõkke	"I'll Never Forget"	Kersti Kuusk
Nightlight Duo and Cowboys	"Another Country Song"	Sven Lõhmus, Mario Kivistik
Sahlene	"Runaway"	Pearu Paulus, Ilmar Laisaar, Alar Kotkas, Jana Hallas
Yvetta Kadakas and Ivo Linna	"Computer Love"	Peeter Thomson

==== Final ====
The final took place on 26 January 2002. Ten songs competed during the show and a jury selected "Runaway" performed by Sahlene as the winner. In addition to winning the right to represent Estonia at the 2002 Eurovision Song Contest, ETV also awarded the winner and the winning songwriters a monetary prize of 30,000 Estonian kroons.

The jury panel that voted in the final consisted of Nicki French (British singer), L-G Alsenius (music producer of the Swedish radio station P4), Nuša Derenda (Slovenian singer), Louis Walsh (Irish music manager and producer), Björgvin Halldórsson (Icelandic singer), Manfred Witt (music, show and entertainment producer of the German broadcaster NDR), Marlain Angelidou (Cypriot singer) and Moshe Datz (Israeli composer and singer). A non-competitive public televote registered 34,399 votes and selected "Another Country Song" by Nightlight Duo and Cowboys as the winner.

Final – 26 January 2002
R/O	Artist	Song	Jury Votes								Total	Place
R/O	Artist	Song	N. French	L-G Alsenius	N. Derenda	L. Walsh	B. Halldórsson	M. Witt	M. Angelidou	M. Datz	Total	Place
1	Jaanika Vilipo	"I'm Falling"	10	8	5	2	7	8	2	7	49	5
2	Yvetta Kadakas and Ivo Linna	"Computer Love"	6	2	1	1	1	1	1	1	14	10
3	Maarja Kivi	"A Dream"	3	4	4	5	5	2	7	8	38	7
4	Lea Liitmaa and Jaagup Kreem	"What If I Fell"	2	7	2	8	4	3	3	2	31	9
5	Gerli Padar	"Need a Little Nothing"	7	12	10	6	6	4	10	5	60	3
6	Hatuna and Riina Riistop	"This Is (What Luv Can Do)"	1	3	3	4	3	6	6	6	32	8
7	Maarja Tõkke	"I'll Never Forget"	4	1	6	7	8	7	8	10	51	4
8	Nightlight Duo and Cowboys	"Another Country Song"	12	6	7	12	10	10	4	4	65	2
9	Sahlene	"Runaway"	5	10	12	10	12	12	12	12	85	1
10	Julia Hillens	"U Can't"	8	5	8	3	2	5	5	3	39	6

== At Eurovision ==
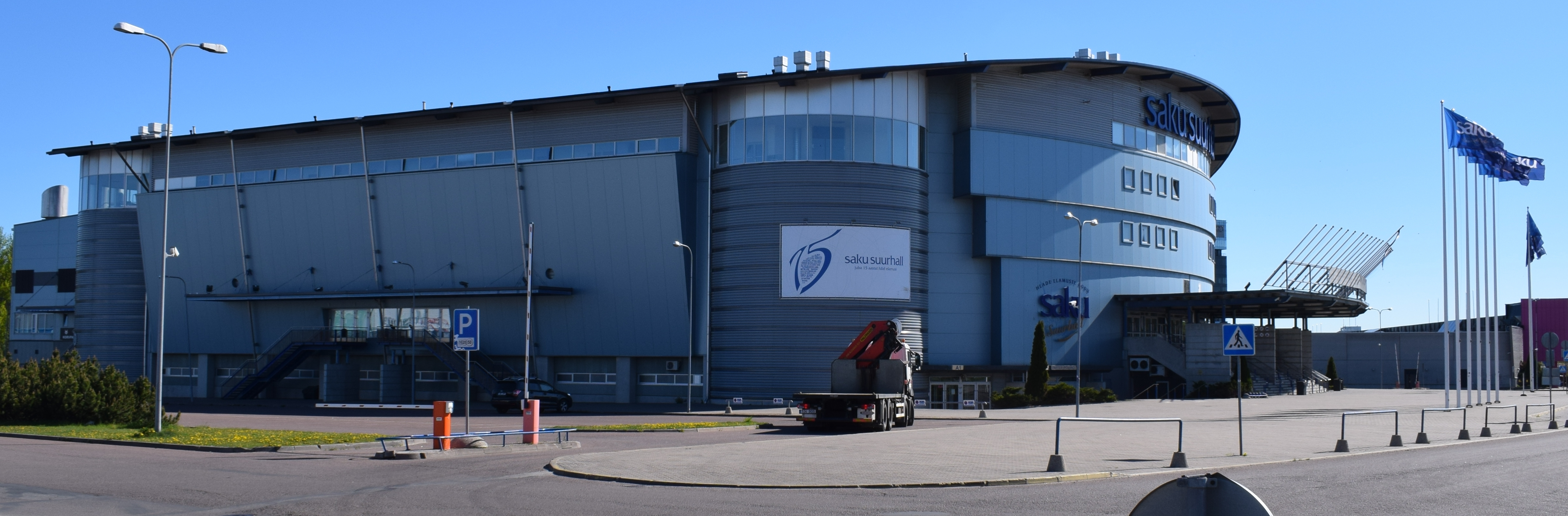
The Eurovision Song Contest 2002 took place at Saku Suurhall in Tallinn, Estonia.

The Eurovision Song Contest 2002 took place at Saku Suurhall in Tallinn, Estonia, on 25 May 2002. The participants list included the previous year's winning country, the "Big Four" countries (France, Germany, Spain, and the United Kingdom), any eligible countries which did not compete in the 2001 contest, and countries which had obtained the highest average points total at the previous year's contest, up to 24 total participants. As the host country, Estonia automatically qualified to participate in the contest. On 9 November 2001, an allocation draw was held which determined the running order and Estonia was set to perform in position 8, following the entry from Russia and before the entry from Macedonia. Sahlene was joined on stage by five backing vocalists: Charlotte Berg, Jelena Juzvik, Joel Sahlin, Jüri Mazurtšak and Lena Olsson-Björkén, and Estonia finished in third place with 111 points.

The contest was broadcast in Estonia on ETV with commentary by Marko Reikop. ETV appointed Ilo-Mai Küttim "Elektra" as its spokesperson to announce the results of the Estonian televote during the show.

=== Voting ===
Below is a breakdown of points awarded to and by Estonia in the contest. The nation awarded its 12 points to Latvia in the contest.

Points awarded to Estonia
Score	Country
12 points	Latvia; Sweden
10 points	Bosnia and Herzegovina; Finland
8 points	Denmark; Turkey
7 points	Lithuania; United Kingdom
6 points	Macedonia; Slovenia
5 points	Croatia
4 points	Belgium; Germany
3 points	Austria; Russia
2 points	Israel; Malta; Romania
1 point	

Points awarded by Estonia
Score	Country
12 points	Latvia
10 points	Russia
8 points	Sweden
7 points	Malta
6 points	United Kingdom
5 points	Finland
4 points	Cyprus
3 points	France
2 points	Lithuania
1 point	Germany
