= Latvia in the Eurovision Song Contest 2002 =

- Eurovision Song Contest 2002
- Participating broadcaster: Latvian Television (LTV)
- Country: Latvia
- Selection process: Eirodziesma 2002
- Selection date: 2 March 2002

Competing entry
- Song: "I Wanna"
- Artist: Marie N
- Songwriters: Marija Naumova; Marats Samauskis

Placement
- Final result: 1st, 176 points

Participation chronology

Latvia was represented at the Eurovision Song Contest 2002 with the song "I Wanna", written by Marija Naumova and Marats Samauskis, and performed by Naumova herself under her artistic name Marie N. The Latvian participating broadcaster, Latvian Television (LTV), organised the national final Eirodziesma 2002 in order to select its entry for the contest. Fifteen songs were selected to compete in the national final on 2 March 2002 where a public televote exclusively selected "I Wonna" performed by Marija Naumova as the winner. The song was later retitled as "I Wanna" for the Eurovision Song Contest, which it eventually won.

Latvia competed in the Eurovision Song Contest which took place on 25 May 2002. Performing during the show in position 23, Latvia placed first out of the 24 participating countries, winning the contest with 176 points.

== Background ==
Prior to the 2002 contest, Latvian Television (LTV) had participated in the Eurovision Song Contest representing Latvia two times since its first entry in 2000 with the song "My Star" performed by Brainstorm which placed 3rd. In the 2001 contest, it placed 18th with the song "Too Much" performed by Arnis Mednis. As part of its duties as participating broadcaster, LTV organises the selection of its entry in the Eurovision Song Contest and broadcasts the event in the country. Since its debut in 2000, LTV had organised the selection show Eirodziesma, a selection procedure that was continued in order to select its entry for the 2002 contest.

== Before Eurovision ==
=== Eirodziesma 2002 ===
Eirodziesma 2002 was the third edition of Eirodziesma, the music competition organised by LTV to select its entries for the Eurovision Song Contest. The competition took place at the Olympic Center in Ventspils on 2 March 2002, hosted by Ija Circene and Ēriks Niedra and broadcast on LTV1.

==== Competing entries ====
Artists and songwriters were able to submit their entries to the broadcaster between 15 October 2001 and 30 November 2001. A record 68 entries were submitted at the conclusion of the submission period. A jury panel appointed by LTV evaluated the submitted songs and selected fifteen entries for the competition. The jury panel consisted of Munro Forbes (British television director and music manager), Kato Hansen (representative of OGAE Norway), Dave Benton (Estonian Eurovision Song Contest 2001 winner), Gediminas Žujus (Lithuanian producer and composer), Antero Päiväläinen (Finnish producer and representative of Taurus Music), Ólöf Jónsdóttir (Eurovision expert at the Iceland Music Information Centre), Sinia Koussolla (Greek music expert), Jørgen Olsen (Danish Eurovision Song Contest 2000 winner) and Brainstorm (2000 Latvian Eurovision entrant). The fifteen competing artists and songs were announced during a press conference on 14 December 2001.

Artist	Song	Songwriter(s)
4.elements	"Remember"	Arnis Mednis, Lauris Reiniks
Andris Ābelīte	"Be Alive"	Andris Ābelīte
Džulians	"A Place to Call Home"	Janis Zvirgdinš
Caffé	"Amberland"	Raimonds Tigulis, Caffé, Mareks Lindbergs
Diāna and Olga Pīrāgs	"My Town"	Diāna Pīrāgs, Gustavs Terzens
Gunārs Kalniņš	"Tell Me Why"	Janis Lamsters, Maris Talbergs, Guntars Račs
Hameleoni	"My Only Dream"	Andris Veinbergs
Jānis Stībelis	"Let's Sing the Song"	Jānis Stībelis
Lauris Reiniks	"My Memory Tape"	Lauris Reiniks
Linda Leen and Horens Stalbe	"Stop the War"	Linda Feldberga, Kārlis Lācis, Horens Stalbe
Madara Celma	"A Girl from a Sunset Town"	Madara Celma
Marija Naumova	"I Wonna"	Marija Naumova, Marats Samauskis
Marina Voitjuka	"Wait (for Love)"	Olegs Jumatovs, Leonids Grezers
Sea Stones	"My Love Is for You"	Jānis Stībelis
Tumsa	"This Is Not Paradise"	Mārtiņš Freimanis

==== Final ====
The final took place on 2 March 2002. Fifteen acts competed and the song with the highest number of votes from the public, "I Wanna" performed by Marija Naumova, was declared the winner. A preliminary vote by a jury panel and the Latvian public prior to the final also selected Marija Naumova as the winner.

Final – 2 March 2002
R/O	Artist	Song	Televote	Place
1	Marina Voitjuka	"Wait (for Love)"	744	14
2	Diāna and Olga Pīrāgs	"My Town"	1,661	9
3	Lauris Reiniks	"My Memory Tape"	3,215	5
4	Caffé	"Amberland"	766	12
5	4.elements	"Remember"	1,987	8
6	Hameleoni	"My Only Dream"	502	15
7	Tumsa	"This Is Not Paradise"	8,003	3
8	Linda Leen and Horens Stalbe	"Stop the War"	18,103	2
9	Sea Stones	"My Love Is for You"	753	13
10	Jānis Stībelis	"Let's Sing the Song"	3,102	7
11	Marija Naumova	"I Wonna"	26,561	1
12	Madara Celma	"A Girl from a Sunset Town"	1,258	11
13	Andris Ābelīte	"Be Alive"	4,864	4
14	Džulians	"A Place to Call Home"	1,328	10
15	Gunārs Kalniņš	"Tell Me Why"	3,148	6

== At Eurovision ==
According to Eurovision rules, all nations with the exceptions of the bottom six countries in the 2001 contest competed in the final. Latvia was originally relegated for being one of the six lowest scoring countries, but was eventually allowed to compete after Portugal withdrew from the contest.

On 9 November 2001, a special allocation draw was held which determined the running order and Latvia was set to perform in position 23, following the entry from the Slovenia and before the entry from Lithuania. The Latvian performance was largely credited for its stage presentation and choreography between Marie N and her backing performers, and the nation won the contest placing first with a score of 176 points. This was the first, and as of 2025 only victory for Latvia in the Eurovision Song Contest.

The show was broadcast in Latvia on LTV1 featuring commentary by Kārlis Streips.

=== Voting ===
Below is a breakdown of points awarded to Latvia and awarded by Latvia in the contest. The nation awarded its 12 points to Estonia in the contest. LTV appointed Ēriks Niedra as its spokesperson to announce the Latvian votes during the final.

Points awarded to Latvia
Score	Country
12 points	Estonia; Germany; Israel; Lithuania; Spain
10 points	Austria; Greece; Russia
8 points	Belgium; France; Switzerland; United Kingdom
7 points	Denmark; Macedonia; Malta
6 points	Finland; Turkey
5 points	Bosnia and Herzegovina; Slovenia; Sweden
4 points	Cyprus
3 points	
2 points	Croatia
1 point	

Points awarded by Latvia
Score	Country
12 points	Estonia
10 points	Russia
8 points	Cyprus
7 points	Malta
6 points	Lithuania
5 points	United Kingdom
4 points	Sweden
3 points	Israel
2 points	France
1 point	Switzerland
