= Smyshlyaev =

Smyshlyaev, Smyshliaev, Smyshlyayev, Smîşleaev, Şmîşleaev, Smâşleaev or Şmâşleaev (Russian: Смышля́ев) is a Russian last name. Feminine variants of the same last name are Smyshlyaeva, Smyshliaeva, Smyshlyayeva, Smîşleaeva, Şmîşleaeva, Smâşleaeva or Şmâşleaeva.

People with this surname include:

- Alexandr Smyshlyaev, Russian freestyle skier
- Violeta Şmîşleaeva, wife of Marcel Pavel
