= Croatia in the Eurovision Song Contest 2002 =

- Eurovision Song Contest 2002
- Participating broadcaster: Croatian Radiotelevision (HRT)
- Country: Croatia
- Selection process: Dora 2002
- Selection date: 10 March 2002

Competing entry
- Song: "Everything I Want"
- Artist: Vesna Pisarović
- Songwriter: Milana Vlaović

Placement
- Final result: 11th, 44 points

Participation chronology

Croatia was represented at the Eurovision Song Contest 2002 with the song "Everything I Want", written by Milana Vlaović, and performed by Vesna Pisarović. The Croatian participating broadcaster, Croatian Radiotelevision (HRT), organised the national final Dora 2002 to select its entry for the contest. Twenty entries competed in the national final on 10 March 2002 and "Sasvim sigurna" performed by Vesna Pisarović was selected as the winner following the combination of votes from five regional juries, a six-member expert jury, a regional televote and an online vote. The song was later translated from Croatian to English for Eurovision and was titled "Everything I Want".

Croatia competed in the Eurovision Song Contest which took place on 25 May 2002. Performing during the show in position 6, Croatia placed eleventh out of the 24 participating countries, scoring 44 points.

== Background ==
Prior to the 2002 Contest, Croatian Radiotelevision (HRT) had participated in the Eurovision Song Contest representing Croatia nine times since its first entry in 1993. Its best result in the contest was fourth, which it achieved on two occasions: in 1996 with the song "Sveta ljubav" performed by Maja Blagdan and in 1999 with the song "Marija Magdalena" performed by Doris Dragović. In 2001, "Strings of My Heart" performed Vanna placed tenth.

As part of its duties as participating broadcaster, HRT organises the selection of its entry in the Eurovision Song Contest and broadcasts the event in the country. Between 1993 and 2001, the broadcaster organised the national final Dora in order to select its entry for the contest, a method that continued for its 2002 participation.

== Before Eurovision ==
=== Dora 2002 ===
Dora 2002 was the tenth edition of the Croatian national selection Dora organised by HRT to select its entry for the Eurovision Song Contest 2002. The competition consisted of twenty entries competing in one final on 10 March 2002 at Pavilion 5 of the Zagreb Fair in Zagreb, hosted by Duško Ćurlić and Bojana Gregorić. The show was broadcast on HTV1 as well as online via the broadcaster's website hrt.hr.

==== Competing entries ====
On 14 November 2001, HRT opened a submission period where artists and composers were able to submit their entries to the broadcaster with the deadline on 5 January 2002. Artists were required to be signed to record companies or have had at least one commercial release in order to participate in the competition. A total of 203 entries were received by the broadcaster during the submission period. An eleven-member expert committee reviewed the received submissions and selected twenty artists and songs for the competition. HRT announced the competing entries on 25 January 2002 and among the artists was Goran Karan who represented Croatia in 2000.

| Artist | Song | Songwriter(s) |
|---|---|---|
| Adalbert Turner - Juci | "Dotakni srce" | Željko Bošković, Silvija Pavičić |
| Alen Lazarić | "Sve ljubavi mog života" | Bruno Krajcar, Bratislav Zlatanović, Elvis Stanić |
| Alen Vitasović | "Ja sam Istrian" | Duško Raputec-Ute, Robert Pilepić |
| Boris Novković | "Elois" | Boris Novković, Stevo Cvikić, Nikša Bratoš |
| Branimir Mihaljević | "Hvala ti za sve" | Branimir Mihaljević, Mario Mihaljević |
| Davor Radolfi | "Odlazim" | Predrag Martinjak, Ante Pecotić, Ines Gvozdanović, Miroslav Lesić |
| Davor Tolja and Leonida Burić | "101 laž" | Davor Tolja, Alida Šarar, Davor Tolja |
| Goran Karan | "Još uvijek vjerujem da ljubav postoji" | Zdenko Runjić, Alka Vujica, Fayo, Goran Karan, Nikša Bratoš |
| Ivan Mikulić | "Ti si tu" | Nenad Vilović, Žana Vuco, Ante Pecotić |
| Jacques | "Čarolija" | Jacques Houdek, Boris Đurđević |
| Joy | "Takav sam ti ja" | Nenad Ninčević, Miro Buljan |
| Klub 4' 33 | "Ave Maria Laudata" | Aleksandar Valenčić, Berislav Valušek, |
| Mladen Burnać | "Ja - Ja" | Zrinko Tutić, Fayo, Tihomir Preradović |
| Najbolji hrvatski tamburaši | "Divne godine" | Mario Vestić, Denis Špegelj |
| Perle | "Nemirna rijeka" | Ingrid Flesch, Asja Hakle, Remi Kazinoti |
| Petar Dragojević | "Laži" | Tonči Huljić, Vjekoslava Huljić, Remi Kazinoti |
| Tihana Sabati | "Ne ljubim više na glas" | Marko Tomasović, Nevia Korpar, Duško Mandić |
| Vesna Pisarović | "Sasvim sigurna" | Milana Vlaović, Ante Pecotić |
| Zak | "Znam ja kako je kad ti uzmu sve" | Marin Bukmir |
| Zdenka Kovačiček | "Odavno shvatila sam sve" | Marko Tomasović, Nevia Korpar, Duško Mandić |

==== Final ====
The final took place on 10 March 2002. All songs were performed with HRT's Revijski Orchestra and the winner, "Sasvim sigurna" performed by Vesna Pisarović, was determined by a combination of votes from four regional juries, an expert jury, a public televote divided into four telephone regions in Croatia and a public online vote that registered 3,226 votes. In addition to the performances of the competing entries, Ivana Spagna and Vanna (who represented Croatia in 2001) performed as the interval acts during the show.

Final – 10 March 2002
| R/O | Artist | Song | Points | Place |
|---|---|---|---|---|
| 1 | Ivan Mikulić | "Ti si tu" | 25 | 9 |
| 2 | Petar Dragojević | "Laži" | 7 | 18 |
| 3 | Adalbert Turner - Juci | "Dotakni srce" | 50 | 5 |
| 4 | Zak | "Znam ja kako je kad ti uzmu sve" | 0 | 20 |
| 5 | Najbolji hrvatski tamburaši | "Divne godine" | 21 | 11 |
| 6 | Alen Lazarić | "Sve ljubavi mog života" | 11 | 16 |
| 7 | Branimir Mihaljević | "Hvala ti za sve" | 10 | 17 |
| 8 | Klub 4' 33 | "Ave Maria Laudata" | 16 | 14 |
| 9 | Davor Radolfi | "Odlazim" | 6 | 19 |
| 10 | Jacques | "Čarolija" | 19 | 13 |
| 11 | Zdenka Kovačiček | "Odavno shvatila sam sve" | 59 | 4 |
| 12 | Tihana Sabati | "Ne ljubim više na glas" | 16 | 14 |
| 13 | Goran Karan | "Još uvijek vjerujem da ljubav postoji" | 71 | 2 |
| 14 | Perle | "Nemirna rijeka" | 24 | 10 |
| 15 | Boris Novković | "Elois" | 63 | 3 |
| 16 | Joy | "Takav sam ti ja" | 21 | 11 |
| 17 | Vesna Pisarović | "Sasvim sigurna" | 118 | 1 |
| 18 | Mladen Burnać | "Ja - Ja" | 36 | 6 |
| 19 | Alen Vitasović | "Ja sam Istrian" | 36 | 6 |
| 20 | Davor Tolja and Leonida Burić | "101 laž" | 29 | 8 |

Detailed Voting Results
| Song | Jury | | | | | | Public Vote | | | | | Total |
| Song | A | B | C | D | E | F | G | H | I | J | K | Total |
|---|---|---|---|---|---|---|---|---|---|---|---|---|
| "Ti si tu" | | | 6 | | 2 | | 8 | 7 | | 2 | | 25 |
| "Laži" | | | 2 | | | | | 5 | | | | 7 |
| "Dotakni srce" | 7 | | | 7 | 8 | | 5 | 1 | 2 | 10 | 10 | 50 |
| "Znam ja kako je kad ti uzmu sve" | | | | | | | | | | | | 0 |
| "Divne godine" | | | | | 5 | | 10 | | | | 6 | 21 |
| "Sve ljubavi mog života" | | | 3 | | | | | | 8 | | | 11 |
| "Hvala ti za sve" | | | 4 | 1 | 4 | 1 | | | | | | 10 |
| "Ave Maria Laudata" | | 4 | | 3 | | | | | 6 | | 3 | 16 |
| "Odlazim" | 2 | | | | | 4 | | | | | | 6 |
| "Čarolija" | 1 | 1 | | | 3 | 5 | | | 1 | 7 | 1 | 19 |
| "Odavno shvatila sam sve" | 8 | 8 | 5 | 8 | 7 | 10 | 1 | 4 | 3 | 5 | | 59 |
| "Ne ljubim više na glas" | 4 | 6 | | | | | 2 | | | | 4 | 16 |
| "Još uvijek vjerujem da ljubav postoji" | 5 | 7 | 8 | 10 | 6 | 6 | 6 | 10 | 5 | 6 | 2 | 71 |
| "Nemirna rijeka" | | 10 | | 4 | 1 | 3 | | 6 | | | | 24 |
| "Elois" | 6 | 2 | 1 | 5 | 10 | 7 | 7 | 8 | 4 | 8 | 5 | 63 |
| "Takav sam ti ja" | 3 | | 12 | | | | 3 | 2 | | 1 | | 21 |
| "Sasvim sigurna" | 10 | 12 | | 12 | 12 | 12 | 12 | 12 | 12 | 12 | 12 | 118 |
| "Ja - Ja" | 12 | 3 | 10 | | | | 4 | 3 | | 4 | | 36 |
| "Ja sam Istrian" | | 5 | | 2 | | 8 | | | 10 | 3 | 8 | 36 |
| "101 laž" | | | 7 | 6 | | 2 | | | 7 | | 7 | 29 |
Dora 2002 voting groups
A: Varaždin; B: Split; C: Rijeka; D: Zagreb; E: Osijek; F: Expert jury; G: Slavonia; H: Dalmatia; I: Istria, Primorje-Gorski Kotar and Lika; J: Northwest and Central Croatia; K: Online vote

Members of the Jury
| Jury | Members |
|---|---|
| Zagreb | Mila Kokotović; Damir Crnčec; Sandra Skolan; Mario Vukušić; Darko Žalac; Ivanka Držaj |
| Split | Sandra Ercegović; Davor Grzunov; Hrvojka Škaro; Nadomir Tadić Šutra; Mario Šiljeg; Paula Dražić Zekić |
| Rijeka | Nedjeljka Jurin; Tatjana Kolak; Ivan Prpić; Mladen Milovčić; Ines Kovačić; Damir Čengić |
| Osijek | Josip Uglik; Maja Dretvić; Denis Čugura; Maja Mikec; Jelenko Topić; Dobrila Živković |
| Varaždin | Zvonimir Aračić; Branka Dubovečak; Damir Sučić; Martina Evačić; Renato Happ; Antonija Habijanec |
| Experts | Vanja Lisak; Siniša Zoranga; Hrvoje Markulj; Željko Mesar; Ivana Vrdoljak |

=== Preparation ===
Following consultation with music and industry experts as well as taking the results of public researches and a public televote held between 13 and 18 March into consideration, it was decided by HRT that "Sasvim sigurna" would be performed in English at the Eurovision Song Contest entitled "Everything I Want". Vesna herself later expressed regret that the song did not remain in Croatian.

== At Eurovision ==
According to Eurovision rules, all nations with the exceptions of the bottom six countries in the 2001 contest competed in the final on 25 May 2002. On 9 November 2001, a special allocation draw was held which determined the running order and Croatia was set to perform in position 6, following the entry from Spain and before the entry from Russia. Croatia finished in eleventh place with 44 points.

The show was broadcast in Croatia on HTV1.

=== Voting ===
Below is a breakdown of points awarded to Croatia and awarded by Croatia in the contest. The nation awarded its 12 points in the contest to Malta. HRT appointed Duško Ćurlić as its spokesperson to announce the Croatian votes during the show.

Points awarded to Croatia
| Score | Country |
|---|---|
| 12 points | Slovenia |
| 10 points | |
| 8 points | |
| 7 points | |
| 6 points | Austria; Cyprus |
| 5 points | Greece; Macedonia; Switzerland |
| 4 points | |
| 3 points | Germany |
| 2 points | Bosnia and Herzegovina |
| 1 point | |

Points awarded by Croatia
| Score | Country |
|---|---|
| 12 points | Malta |
| 10 points | Cyprus |
| 8 points | Slovenia |
| 7 points | Bosnia and Herzegovina |
| 6 points | Spain |
| 5 points | Estonia |
| 4 points | Macedonia |
| 3 points | Turkey |
| 2 points | Latvia |
| 1 point | Greece |
