= Greece in the Eurovision Song Contest 2002 =

- Eurovision Song Contest 2002
- Participating broadcaster: Hellenic Broadcasting Corporation (ERT)
- Country: Greece
- Selection process: Ellinikós Telikós 2002
- Selection date: 26 February 2002

Competing entry
- Song: "S.A.G.A.P.O."
- Artist: Michalis Rakintzis
- Songwriter: Michalis Rakintzis

Placement
- Final result: 17th, 27 points

Participation chronology

Greece was represented at the Eurovision Song Contest 2002 with the song "S.A.G.A.P.O.", written and performed by Michalis Rakintzis. The Greek participating broadcaster, the Hellenic Broadcasting Corporation (ERT), organised a public selection process entitled Ellinikós Telikós 2002 to determine its entry for the contest. Held on 26 February 2002 in Athens, the event saw 10 entries compete to be the Greek entry; the results were determined by a combination of jury, SMS and televoting. The song "S.A.G.A.P.O." by Michalis Rakintzis received the most votes and was selected to represent the nation. Greece performed fourth out of the 24 countries competing in the contest and placed 17th with 27 points.

== Background ==
The Hellenic Broadcasting Corporation (ERT) is a full member of the European Broadcasting Union (EBU), thus eligible to participate in the Eurovision Song Contest representing Greece. Prior to the 2002 contest, Greece had participated in the contest 22 times since its debut entry in 1974. To this point, the nation achieved its best placing at the previous contest in 2001, where the song "Die for You" performed by Antique placed third. Greece's least successful result was in 1998 when it placed 20th with the song "Mia krifi evaisthisia" by Thalassa, receiving only twelve points in total, all from Cyprus.

== Before Eurovision ==
=== Ellinikós Telikós 2002 ===
Ellinikós Telikós 2002 was the Greek national final developed by ERT to select its entry for the Eurovision Song Contest 2002. The competition, hosted by Dafni Bokota and directed by Dafni Tzaferi, took place on 26 February 2002 at the REX Music Hall in Athens; it was broadcast on television station ET1, radio station Second Programme and via the ERT website. Ten candidate entries competed over two rounds of voting. After the first round consisting of all ten candidate entries, jury voting selected five to proceed to the second round. The winner of the event was then selected by a 50/50 combination of jury voting and public televoting. The six-member jury consisted of Giorgos Katsaros (composer and jury president), Antonis Andrikakis (General Director of ERA), Giorgos Kyvelos (producer and advisor to the ERT president), Lefteris Koggalidis (communications, promotions and public relations at ERT), Bokota (television presenter) and Sinia Kousoula (international relations at ERT). During the voting phase, One, who would represent Cyprus in 2002, performed as special guests and video clips of previous Greek Eurovision entries were shown, including "Krasi, thalassa ke t'agori mou" by Marinella (1974), "Mathima solfege" by Paschalis, Marianna, Robert and Bessy (1977), "Charlie Chaplin" by Tania Tsanaklidou (1978), "Sokrati" by Elpida (1979), "Autostop" by Anna Vissi and the Epikouri (1980), "Stop" by Bang (1987), "I anixi" by Sophia Vossou (1991), "Olou tou kosmou i Elpida" by Cleopatra (1992), "Ellada, hora tou fotos" by Katy Garbi (1993), and "Die for You" by Antique (2001).

Prior to the event, ERT opened a submissions window for Greek composers, lyricists, and performers to submit their original songs for consideration by 17 December 2001. By the close of the submissions window, 158 songs had been submitted; the ten songs for the event were then selected by the six-member jury and were announced on 10 January 2002. Nearly 95,000 votes were cast during the show and when the combined results were presented, it was revealed that "S.A.G.A.P.O." performed by Michalis Rakintzis, was the winner.

First Round – 26 February 2002
R/O	Artist	Song	Songwriter(s)	Result
1	Kostas Bigalis and Mirella Fragkopoulou	"Let Me Be the One"	Kostas Bigalis	Advanced
2	Veronika	"Tu non c'eri qui"	Charalampos Persidis	—N/a
3	Yiannis Kokkinos, Flora Theodorou, Ermioni Komninou and Tolis Kokkinos	"Pension – Sweet Home"	Christos Konstantinidis, Panagiotis Kalkos	—N/a
4	Christos Giannopoulos	"Proti fthinoporini vrochi" (Πρώτη φθινοπωρινή βροχή)	Christos Giannopoulos	—N/a
5	Maria-Louiza and Not 4 Sale	"2 Be Together"	Nikos Terzis, Antonis Pappas	Advanced
6	Peggy Zina	"Love Is a Wonderful Thing"	Thanos Kalliris	Advanced
7	Elina Konstantopoulou and Marion Georgiou	"Beautiful Life"	Konstantinos Tseleste Papakonstantinou, Iro Trigoni	—N/a
8	Michalis Rakintzis	"S.A.G.A.P.O."	Michalis Rakintzis	Advanced
9	Katerina Topazi	"Moiazei na 'nai sinema/Y tu cruel" (Μοιάζει να 'ναι σινεμά)	Ioannis Stinkas, Dimitris Sotakis, Xenofon Chalatsis	—N/a
10	Motive	"Fire"	Giannis Methenitis	Advanced

Second Round – 26 February 2002
R/O	Artist	Song	Jury	Televote		Total	Place
R/O	Artist	Song	Jury	Votes	Rank	Total	Place
1	Kostas Bigalis and Mirella Fragkopoulou	"Let Me Be the One"	4	12,736	4	8	4
2	Maria-Louiza and Not 4 Sale	"2 Be Together"	2	12,936	3	5	2
3	Peggy Zina	"Love Is a Wonderful Thing"	3	25,517	2	5	2
4	Michalis Rakintzis	"S.A.G.A.P.O."	1	33,356	1	2	1
5	Motive	"Fire"	5	9,796	5	10	5

==== Reception ====
In the days following Rakintzis' selection, Greek press reported on an issue during the televoting phase in that while the process and phone numbers were explained, the host never announced the commencement of the voting period. Additionally, the singer was accused of using playback for the performance and it was noted that there were sound problems overall. At a press conference held by the artist, Rakintzis stated that he was willing to resign from being the Greek entrant due to the voting issue, but ERT had responded that if he were to not represent the nation, then they would pull out of the contest. Rakintzis subsequently opted to remain the Greek entrant. Following his selection, Rakintzis opted to not organise a promotional tour to other countries, believing that music had nothing to do with advertising.

== At Eurovision ==
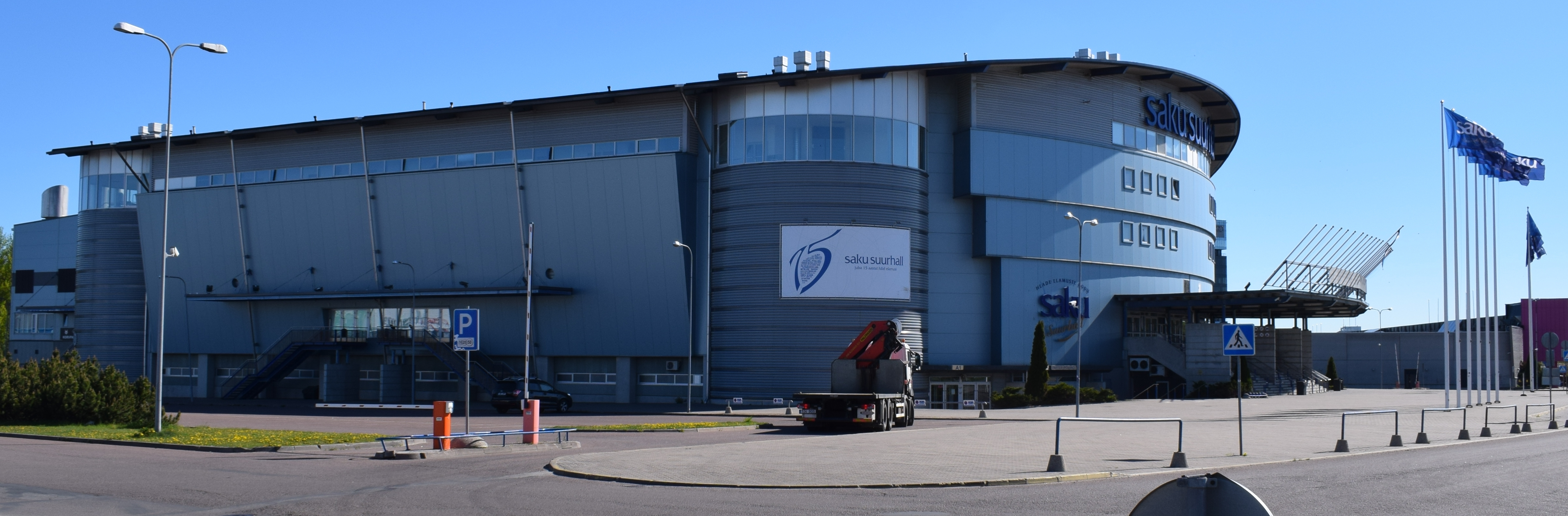
The Eurovision Song Contest 2002 took place at Saku Suurhall in Tallinn, Estonia.

The Eurovision Song Contest 2002 took place at Saku Suurhall in Tallinn, Estonia, on 25 May 2002. The participants list included the previous year's winning country, the "Big Four" countries, consisting of France, Germany, Spain and the United Kingdom, any eligible countries which did not compete in the 2001 contest, and countries which had obtained the highest average points total at the previous year's contest, up to 24 total participants. As Greece placed third at the 2001 contest, it was permitted to participate this year. Bokota provided commentary for the broadcast within Greece, a task she had performed for ERT since the 1999 contest.

For the performance, Rakintzis was joined by four vocalists/musicians: Giannis Karmas (keyboards), Michalis Kyriakidis (guitar), Nikos Menemenoglou (drums) and Terry Mavridis (bass). The ensemble took part in rehearsals for the performance during the week of 20-25 May 2002, which concluded with the final dress rehearsal on 25 May where the national juries of each country viewed the performances and recorded their votes. They performed fourth in the running order at the contest and wore "militaristic" leather outfits which were designed by Rakintzis. The outfits would later earn Rakintzis the Barbara Dex Award for worst-dressed act at the year's contest. The song finished 17th out of 24 with 27 points, receiving points from four of the 24 participating countries. Greek press was critical of the song and its performance. Following the contest at a press conference in Athens, Rakintzis stated "I came close to throwing down my microphone and walking off the stage," commenting on the sound quality of the performance which he claimed was responsible for his low contest placement. The Eurovision committee later released a statement that "there was no technical problem with the sound, if there was a problem it was with the singer."

=== Voting ===
Voting during the show involved each country awarding points from 1-8, 10 and 12 as determined by either 100% televoting or a combination of 50% televoting and 50% national jury. In cases where televoting was not possible, only the votes of the eight-member national juries were tabulated. Greece received 27 points, which included the top 12 points from Cyprus, to which the nation also awarded its 12 points. Alexis Kostalas was the Greek spokesperson announcing the country's voting results during the show, a task he had performed since the 1998 contest. The tables below visualise a complete breakdown of the points awarded to and awarded by Greece in the Eurovision Song Contest 2002.

Points awarded to Greece
Score	Country
12 points	Cyprus
10 points	
8 points	Russia
7 points	
6 points	Romania
5 points	
4 points	
3 points	
2 points	
1 point	Croatia

Points awarded by Greece
Score	Country
12 points	Cyprus
10 points	Latvia
8 points	Romania
7 points	United Kingdom
6 points	Malta
5 points	Croatia
4 points	Spain
3 points	France
2 points	Russia
1 point	Sweden
