= Monica Anghel =

Romanian singer and television personality (born 1971)

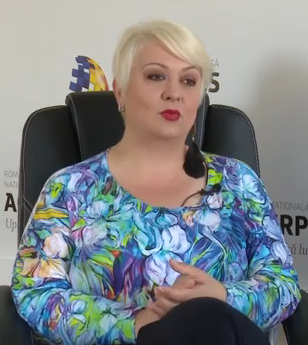
- Monica Anghel in 2015

Background information
- Born: Monica Anghel; 1 June 1971 (age 54); Bucharest, Romania
- Genres: Pop
- Occupations: Singer; television personality; actress
- Instrument: Voice
- Years active: 1985–present

Monica Anghel (Romanian pronunciation: [moˈnika ˈaŋɡel]; born 1 June 1971) is a Romanian singer, actress and television personality. She represented Romania at the Eurovision Song Contest 2002 together with Marcel Pavel, finishing ninth with the song "Tell Me Why".

== Career ==
In 1996, Anghel participated in the international preselection for the Eurovision Song Contest with the song "Rugă pentru pacea lumii". Although Romania did not qualify for the final in Oslo, she won the Golden Stag Festival that year.

Anghel represented Romania at the Eurovision Song Contest 2002 in Tallinn alongside Marcel Pavel. Their entry, "Tell Me Why", finished ninth, matching Romania's best Eurovision result at the time.

She later collaborated with the Romanian comedy group Divertis and became active in television and entertainment projects.

Anghel also provided the Romanian voice of one of the Muses in the dubbed versions of Disney's Hercules.

== Personal life ==
Anghel is married to businessman Marian Vintilă. The couple have a son, Aviv.

In the 2010s and 2020s, Anghel spoke publicly about major lifestyle changes and significant weight loss, attributing them to dietary changes and increased attention to health.

== Filmography ==
- Proprietarii de stele (2001) – Ema
- Snow, Tea and Love (2020)

== See also ==
- Music of Romania
- List of Romanian actresses

Awards and achievements
| Preceded by Dan Bittman with "Dincolo de nori" | Winner of Selecţia Naţională; 1996 | Succeeded by Mălina Olinescu with "Eu cred" |
| Preceded by Taxi (Romanian band) with "The Moon" | Romania in the Eurovision Song Contest; 2002 (with Marcel Pavel) | Succeeded by Nicoleta Alexandru with "Don't Break My Heart" |
| Preceded by Taxi (Romanian band) with "The Moon" | Winner of Selecţia Naţională; 2002 (with Marcel Pavel) | Succeeded by Nicoleta Alexandru with "Don't Break My Heart" |
