= Israel in the Eurovision Song Contest 2002 =

- Eurovision Song Contest 2002
- Participating broadcaster: Israel Broadcasting Authority (IBA)
- Country: Israel
- Selection process: Internal selection
- Announcement date: Artist: 26 November 2001; Song: 26 February 2002

Competing entry
- Song: "Light a Candle"
- Artist: Sarit Hadad
- Songwriters: Svika Pick; Yoav Ginai

Placement
- Final result: 12th, 37 points

Participation chronology

Israel was represented at the Eurovision Song Contest 2002 with the song "Light a Candle", composed by Svika Pick, with lyrics by Yoav Ginai, and performed by Sarit Hadad. The Israeli participating broadcaster, the Israel Broadcasting Authority (IBA), internally selected its entry for the contest. The broadcaster announced Sarit Hadad as its representative on 26 November 2001, while the song was presented to the public on 26 February 2002 during the Meni Peer Show on Channel 1.

Israel competed in the Eurovision Song Contest which took place on 25 May 2002. Performing during the show in position 10, Israel placed twelfth out of the 24 participating countries, scoring 37 points.

== Background ==
Prior to the 2002 contest, the Israel Broadcasting Authority (IBA) had participated in the Eurovision Song Contest representing Israel twenty-four times since its first entry in 1973. It has won the contest on three occasions: in 1978 with the song "A-Ba-Ni-Bi" by Izhar Cohen and the Alphabeta, in 1979 with the song "Hallelujah" by Milk and Honey, in 1998 with the song "Diva" by Dana International. In 2001, "Ein Davar" performed by Tal Sondak placed sixteenth.

As part of its duties as participating broadcaster, IBA organises the selection of its entry in the Eurovision Song Contest and broadcasts the event in the country. The broadcaster confirmed its participation in the 2002 contest on 19 July 2001. To select its entry for 2002, IBA conducted an internal selection to select both the artist and song that would represent Israel due to high costs of producing the Kdam Eurovision national final.

== Before Eurovision ==
=== Internal selection ===
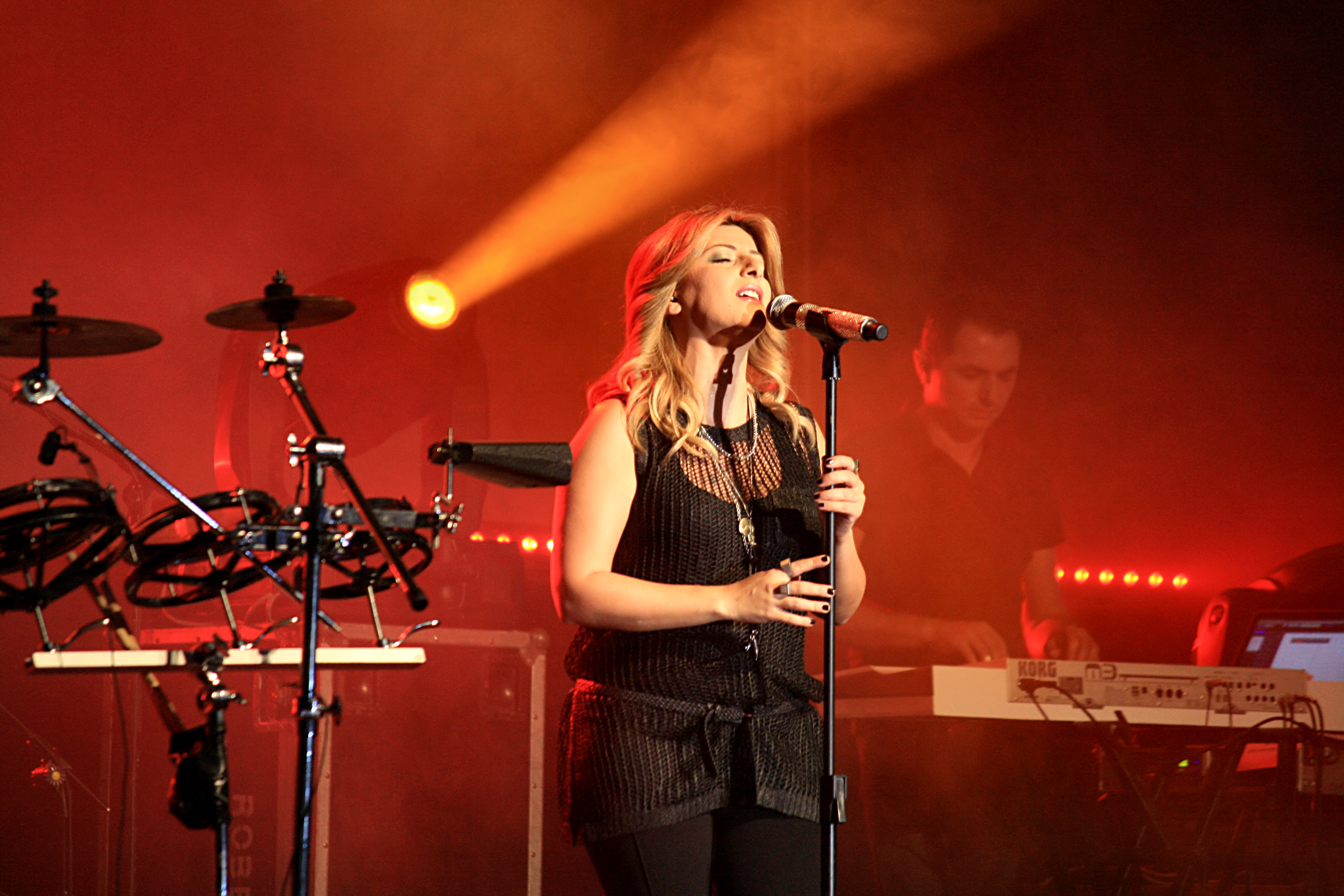
Sarit Hadad was internally selected to represent Israel in the Eurovision Song Contest 2002

On 26 November 2001, IBA announced that Sarit Hadad was selected by a special committee as its representative for the Eurovision Song Contest 2002. Among artists considered by the selection committee, Gaia and Zehava Ben were highly considered before Hadad was ultimately selected. The members of the committee were Yala Granot (member of the IBA Executive Committee), Aviva Avidan (singer), Yigal Hared (musician and composer), Izhar Cohen (Eurovision Song Contest 1978 winner and 1985 Israeli Eurovision entrant), Ezra Suleiman (CEO of the Israeli Mediterranean Music Association), Haïm Ulliel (singer), Tal Perry (journalist), Amos Oren (journalist), Nava Achiron (Channel 1 music editor), Gavri Mazor (composer), Noam Gil-Or (Kol Yisrael editor and presenter), Tal Gordon (singer) and Avihu Medina (composer).

Four songs were later submitted by Sarit Hadad and subsequently evaluated by the committee on 24 December 2001. The selected song, "Nadlik Beyakhad Ner", was announced on 7 January 2002 and presented on 26 February 2002 during the Meni Peer Show which was broadcast on Channel 1. "Nadlik Beyakhad Ner" was written by Yoav Ginai and Svika Pick, who had previously written the Israeli Eurovision Song Contest 1998 winning song "Diva", and was later retitled as "Light a Candle". In regards to the song, Sarit Hadad stated: "The song is appropriate to these times and situation and it has a meesage of hope. I'll sing it from the bottom of my heart. It gives me a chance to express my voice and feelings." Hadad later revealed that the song "Mr. DJ Superman", which placed second in the committee voting, was her personal favorite among the four she provided for the contest.

Song selection – 24 December 2001
Song	Songwriter(s)	Points	Place
"Malcat Hadisco" (מלכת הדיסקו)	Svika Pick, Ehud Manor	90	3
"Mr. DJ Superman"	Svika Pick, Yoav Ginai	144	2
"Nadlik Beyakhad Ner" (נדליק ביחד נר)	Svika Pick, Yoav Ginai	150	1
"Yasu Yasu" (יאסו יאסו)	Sarit Hadad, David Zigman	90	3

== At Eurovision ==
The Eurovision Song Contest 2002 took place at Saku Suurhall in Tallinn, Estonia, on 25 May 2002. The participants list included the previous year's winning country, the "Big Four" countries, consisting of France, Germany, Spain, and the United Kingdom, any eligible countries which did not compete in the 2001 contest, and countries which had obtained the highest average points total at the previous year's contest, up to 24 total participants. According to Eurovision rules, all nations with the exceptions of the bottom six countries in the 2001 contest competed in the final. On 9 November 2001, an allocation draw was held which determined the running order and Israel was set to perform in position 10, following the entry from Macedonia and before the entry from Switzerland. Israel finished in twelfth place with 37 points.

The show, which was televised live in Israel on Channel 1, received a market share of 34.6% and was the second most watched programme of 2002 in the country.

=== Voting ===
Below is a breakdown of points awarded to Israel and awarded by Israel in the contest. The nation awarded its 12 points to Latvia in the contest. IBA appointed Michal Zo'aretz as its spokesperson to announce the Israeli votes during the show.

Points awarded to Israel
Score	Country
12 points	
10 points	France
8 points	
7 points	
6 points	
5 points	Finland; Germany; Romania; United Kingdom
4 points	
3 points	Latvia
2 points	Belgium
1 point	Denmark; Switzerland

Points awarded by Israel
Score	Country
12 points	Latvia
10 points	Malta
8 points	Romania
7 points	France
6 points	Spain
5 points	United Kingdom
4 points	Denmark
3 points	Sweden
2 points	Estonia
1 point	Russia
