= Russia in the Eurovision Song Contest 2002 =

- Eurovision Song Contest 2002
- Participating broadcaster: Russian Public Television (ORT)
- Country: Russia
- Selection process: Internal selection
- Announcement date: Artist: 4 March 2002; Song: 13 April 2002

Competing entry
- Song: "Northern Girl"
- Artist: Prime Minister
- Songwriters: Kim Breitburg; Karen Kavaleryan; Yevgeny Fridlyand; Irina Antonyan

Placement
- Final result: 10th, 55 points

Participation chronology

Russia was represented at the Eurovision Song Contest 2002 with the song "Northern Girl", written by Kim Breitburg, Karen Kavaleryan, Yevgeny Fridlyand, and Irina Antonyan, and performed by Prime Minister. The Russian entry was selected internally by the Russian broadcaster Russian Public Television (ORT). At the contest, Russia placed 10th and scored 55 points.

== Before Eurovision ==
=== Internal selection ===
On 17 January 2002, ORT announced a submission period for interested artists and composers to submit their entries until 26 February 2002. The broadcaster received 11,742 submissions at the conclusion of the deadline, including entries from Arkady Ukupnik, Diana Gurtskaya and Vitas. 25 entries were shortlisted from the received submissions and a jury panel selected the Russian entry. The jury consisted of Konstantin Ernst (general manager of C1R), Aleksandr Fifeman (general producer of ORT), Marina Danielyan (service manager of ORT), Ilya Bachurin (music director of ORT), Valdis Pelšs (television presenter and entertainment director of ORT), Lev Leshchenko (singer), Oleg Gazmanov (singer), Ilya Reznik (lyricist) and Igor Matvienko (composer and producer).

On 4 March 2002, C1R announced during a press conference that they had internally selected Prime Minister to represent Russia in Tallinn with the song "Northern Girl". Prime Minister's selection as the Russian representative was decided upon by the jury panel from two entries considered: "Northern Girl" performed by Prime Minister and "All My Love" performed by Kristina Orbakaitė. "Northern Girl" was composed by Kim Breitburg, with lyrics by Karen Kavaleryan, Evgeniy Fridlyand and Irina Antonyan. The song was presented to the public on 13 April 2002 through the release of the official music video, directed by Sergey Kalvarsky.

First Round
Artist(s)	Song	Songwriter(s)	Place
Alexandr Fedyoura	Unknown	Unknown	13
Anna Churchin	Unknown	Unknown	12
Anna Jack	Unknown	Unknown	15
Arkady Ukupnik	Unknown	Unknown	4
Biba	Unknown	Unknown	23
Diana Gurtskaya	Unknown	Unknown	6
Goliy pistolet	Unknown	Unknown	10
Inga Guy	"Zheltoye solntse" (Желтое солнце)	Unknown	22
Julietta M.	"Svetlaya noch" (Светлая ночь)	Julietta M.	17
Kristina Orbakaitė	"All My Love"	Viktor Drobysh, Mary Susan Applegate	2
Liliya Zagorodnyuk	Unknown	Unknown	25
Mark Twain	Unknown	Unknown	19
Neo Positive	Unknown	Unknown	21
Nik	Unknown	Unknown	18
Nogu Svelo!	Unknown	Unknown	7
Opium	Unknown	Unknown	16
Plazma	Unknown	Unknown	9
Premyer-Ministr	"Northern Girl"	Kim Breitburg, Karen Kavaleryan, Yevgeny Fridlyand, Irina Antonyan	1
Rinat Ibragimov	"Shurale"	Unknown	5
Sed'maya Model	"Vanyusha" (Ванюша)	Unknown	24
Sergey Chelobanov and Ksenia	"Ya i ty" (Я и ты)	Unknown	8
Sherif	Unknown	Unknown	14
Shura Sharman	Unknown	Unknown	20
Vitas	Unknown	Unknown	3
Yury Zimakov	Unknown	Unknown	11

Second Round
Artist	Song	Place
Premyer-Ministr	"Northern Girl"	1
Kristina Orbakaitė	"All My Love"	2
Vitas	Unknown	3

== At Eurovision ==
Russia performed 7th at the 2002 Contest, following Croatia and preceding Estonia. Premier Ministr anglicized their band name and appeared in the contest as Prime Minister. After the voting concluded, Russia scored 55 points and placed 10th.

=== Voting ===
The voting spokesperson for Russia was Arina Sharapova.

Points awarded to Russia
Score	Country
12 points	
10 points	Estonia; Latvia; Romania
8 points	Malta
7 points	
6 points	Lithuania
5 points	Cyprus
4 points	
3 points	Finland
2 points	Greece
1 point	Israel

Points awarded by Russia
Score	Country
12 points	Romania
10 points	Latvia
8 points	Greece
7 points	Belgium
6 points	Cyprus
5 points	Malta
4 points	Lithuania
3 points	Estonia
2 points	Germany
1 point	Austria
