= Macedonia in the Eurovision Song Contest 2002 =

- Eurovision Song Contest 2002
- Participating broadcaster: Macedonian Radio Television (MRT)
- Country: Macedonia
- Selection process: Skopje Fest 2002
- Selection date: 16 February 2002

Competing entry
- Song: "Od nas zavisi"
- Artist: Karolina
- Songwriters: Nikola Perevski; Vladimir Krstevski

Placement
- Final result: 19th, 25 points

Participation chronology

Macedonia (Note: Officially under the provisional appellation "former Yugoslav Republic of Macedonia", abbreviated "FYR Macedonia".) was represented at the Eurovision Song Contest 2002 with the song "Od nas zavisi" (Од нас зависи), composed by Nikola Perevski, with lyrics by Vladimir Krstevski, and performed by Karolina. The Macedonian participating broadcaster, Macedonian Radio Television (MRT), organised the national final Skopje Fest 2002 to select its entry for the contest. Eighteen entries competed in the national final on 16 February 2002 and "Od nas zavisi" performed by Karolina was selected as the winner following the combination of votes from a nine-member jury panel, an audience vote and a public televote.

Macedonia competed in the Eurovision Song Contest which took place on 25 May 2002. Performing during the show in position 9, Macedonia placed nineteenth out of the 24 participating countries, scoring 25 points.

== Background ==
Prior to the 2002 contest, Macedonian Radio Television (MRT) had participated in the Eurovision Song Contest twice since its first entry in 1998. Its best result in the contest to this point was fifteenth, achieved in 2000 with the song "100% te ljubam" performed by XXL.

As part of its duties as participating broadcaster, MRT organises the selection of its entry in the Eurovision Song Contest and broadcasts the event in the country. The broadcaster had previously selected both of its entries for the contest by using the national final Skopje Fest. For 2002, the broadcaster again opted to select its entry through Skopje Fest.

== Before Eurovision ==
=== Skopje Fest 2002 ===
MRT used the 2002 edition of the Skopje Fest song contest to select its entry for the Eurovision Song Contest 2002. A submission period was opened for interested composers to submit their songs and MRT received 121 submissions at the closing of the deadline. Eighteen competing artists and songs were selected in late September 2001 by a nine-member committee consisting of Nikola Dimuševski, Aleksandar Džambazov, Ilija Pejovski, Živoin Glisić, Trajče Organdžiev, Bodan Arsovski, Biljana Nikolovska, Dragan Kostić and Zoran Mirčevski. Bilen Eminov, Maja Odžaklievska (in a duet with Andrijana Janevska) and Marijan Stojanovski were originally announced as performers of the songs, but were ultimately not included in the final list having been replaced by Aneta Eftimova and Marjan Nikolovski.

Skopje Fest 2002 took place on 16 February 2002 at the Macedonian National Theatre in Skopje, hosted by Igor Džambazov and broadcast on MTV 1 and MTV Sat. The eighteen entries competed and a combination of a nine-member jury panel (40%), public televoting (40%) and votes from the audience in the venue (20%) selected "Od nas zavisi" performed by Karolina Gočeva as the winner, followed by Andrijana Janevska who was the runner-up with "O šeri, mon šeri" and Risto Samardžiev who came third with "Nema veke pesni tazni". Karolina was the favourite with all three voting groups.

Final – 16 February 2002
R/O	Artist	Song	Songwriter(s)	Points	Place
1	Gjorgji Krstevski	"Pesna za tebe" (Песна за тебе)	Kaliopi Grill	159	5
2	Fani	"Lejdi" (Лејди)	Grigor Koprov, Ognen Nedelkovski	24	14
3	Biba	"Neobičen krug" (Необичен круг)	Biljana Dodeva, Ana Antovska	16	15
4	Žarmena	"Somnež" (Сомнеж)	Dimče Kitrozoski	0	18
5	Vera Janković	"Veti mi" (Вети ми)	Ljupčo Mirkovski, Ognen Nedelkovski	34	13
6	Lidija Kočovska	"Lice i opačina" (Лице и опачина)	Zoran Ilievski	96	7
7	Karolina Gočeva	"Od nas zavisi" (Од нас зависи)	Nikola Perevski, Vladimir Krstevski	346	1
8	Marjan Nikolovski and Lozena	"Kaži mi, kaži" (Кажи ми, кажи)	Zlatko Crvenkovski	57	11
9	Ana Simonovska	"Kako mi e mene" (Како ми е мене)	Ana Simonovska	15	16
10	Pece Ognenov	"Sakam da sme zaedno" (Сакам да сме заедно)	Andrijana Janevska	13	17
11	Andrijana Janevska	"O šeri, mon šeri" (О шери, мон шери)	Grigor Koprov	238	2
12	Desko and Suzana	"Sekjavanje" (Сеќавање)	Stevče Črcev, Gjoko Georgiev	70	9
13	Risto Samardžiev	"Nema vekje pesni tažni" (Нема веќе песни тажни)	Vladimir Dojčinovski, Risto Samardžiev	224	3
14	Bagaž	"Kje te najdam" (Ќе те најдам)	Bubo Karov	89	8
15	Aneta Eftimova	"Za samo edna nokj" (За само една ноќ)	Jovica Karallievski	58	10
16	Tijana	"Izgrev" (Изгрев)	Vladimir Dojčinovski, Vesna Malinova	177	4
17	Marija Georgieva and Gjoko Taneski	"Koga molčat očite" (Кога молчат очите)	Angel Josifov, Ristenka Pecova	45	12
18	Ljubko Angelov	"Totalen kolaps" (Тотален колапс)	Trajče Organdžiev, Vančo Tarabunov	127	6

== At Eurovision ==
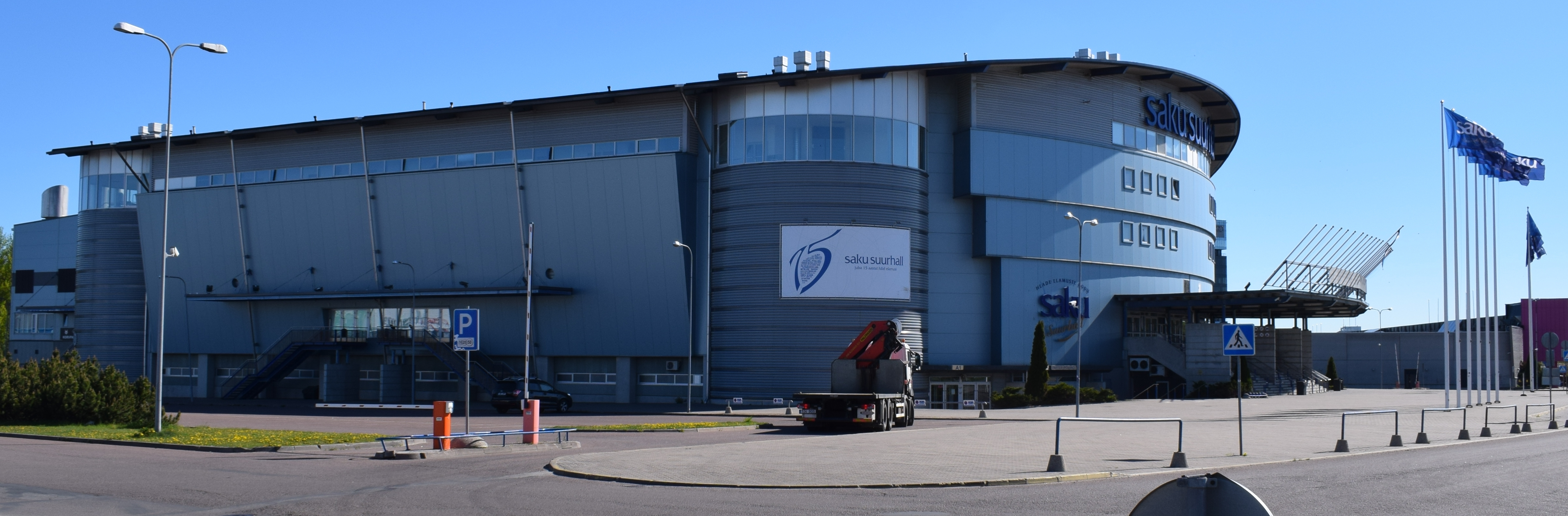
The Eurovision Song Contest 2002 took place at Saku Suurhall in Tallinn, Estonia.

The Eurovision Song Contest 2002 took place at Saku Suurhall in Tallinn, Estonia, on 25 May 2002. The participants list included the previous year's winning country, the "Big Four" countries (France, Germany, Spain, and the United Kingdom), any eligible countries which did not compete in the 2001 contest, and countries which had obtained the highest average points total at the previous year's contest, up to 24 total participants. Macedonia did not compete in the 2001 contest and thus were permitted to participate. On 9 November 2001, an allocation draw was held which determined the running order and Macedonia was set to perform in position 9, following the entry from Estonia and before the entry from Israel.

During the performance, Karolina appeared donning a dress and a golden corsette designed by Aleksandar Nošpal. Macedonia finished in nineteenth place with 25 points. In a later review of her performance, Katerina Stevovska of the Macedonian journal Sloboden Pečat opined that Karolina "perfectly" sang her song.

=== Voting ===
Below is a breakdown of points awarded to Macedonia and awarded by Macedonia in the contest. The nation awarded its 12 points to Romania in the contest.

MRT appointed Biljana Debarlieva as its spokesperson to announce the Macedonian jury votes during the show.

Points awarded to Macedonia
Score	Country
12 points	Romania
10 points	
8 points	
7 points	
6 points	
5 points	Malta
4 points	Croatia
3 points	Cyprus
2 points	
1 point	Finland

Points awarded by Macedonia
Score	Country
12 points	Romania
10 points	Malta
8 points	Turkey
7 points	Latvia
6 points	Estonia
5 points	Croatia
4 points	United Kingdom
3 points	Bosnia and Herzegovina
2 points	Slovenia
1 point	Finland
