= Taxi (Romanian band) =

Romanian pop-rock band

- Origin: Romania
- Genres: Pop rock • alternative rock • pop • synth-pop • electropop • folk rock • satirical music
- Years active: 1999–present
- Members: Dan Teodorescu; Adrian Bortun; Cantemir Neacşu; Mugurel Coman; Darius; Vicky Albu
- Website: http://www.trupataxi.ro

Taxi is a Romanian pop-rock band. The band's musical genres include rock, contemporary pop, using Nashville-style guitar licks.

The band was founded on 13 March 1999 in Bucharest. It represented Romania at the Eurovision Song Contest 2000 with the song The Moon, finishing 17th.

== Band members ==
- Dan Teodorescu (vocals, guitar)
- Adrian Bortun (bass guitar)- until November 2009
- Cantemir Neacșu (lead guitars), January 2006 – present
- George (a.k.a. Georgică or GXG) Pătrănoiu (lead guitars) December 1999 – January 2006
- Andrei Bărbulescu (drums), March–November 1999, February 2003 – June 2006 (?)
- Lucian Cioargă (drums), December 1999 – February 2003
- Darius Neagu (drums), July 2006 – present
- Mugurel Coman (keyboards), January 2006 – present
- Vicky Albu (vocals)
- Kerezsi Csongor (bass guitar) - November 2009 – present

== Albums ==
- Jumătate de album (November 1999)
- Trag un claxon (July 2000: Jumătate de album plus seven more songs)
- Comunitaru' (2001)
- Americanofonia (summer 2001)
- De cursă lungă (2002)
- C (June 2003)
- Politica (2004)
- Romantica (2007)
- Cele 2 cuvinte (2011)
- 15 (2014)
- 20 (2019)

== Notes ==
Preceded by Mălina Olinescu with "Eu cred"	Romania in the Eurovision Song Contest; 2000	Succeeded by Monica Anghel and Marcel Pavel with "Tell Me Why"
Preceded by Mălina Olinescu with "Eu cred"	Winner of Selecţia Naţională; 2000	Succeeded by Monica Anghel and Marcel Pavel with "Tell Me Why"
