= Germany in the Eurovision Song Contest 2002 =

- Eurovision Song Contest 2002
- Participating broadcaster: ARD (Note: Arbeitsgemeinschaft der öffentlich-rechtlichen Rundfunkanstalten der Bundesrepublik Deutschland) – Norddeutscher Rundfunk (NDR)
- Country: Germany
- Selection process: Countdown Grand Prix Eurovision 2002
- Selection date: 22 February 2002

Competing entry
- Song: "I Can't Live Without Music"
- Artist: Corinna May
- Songwriters: Ralph Siegel; Bernd Meinunger

Placement
- Final result: 21st, 17 points

Participation chronology

Germany was represented at the Eurovision Song Contest 2002 with the song "I Can't Live Without Music", composed by Ralph Siegel, with lyrics by Bernd Meinunger, and performed by Corinna May. The German participating broadcaster on behalf of ARD, Norddeutscher Rundfunk (NDR), organised the national final Countdown Grand Prix Eurovision 2002 in order to select their entry for the contest. The national final took place on 22 February 2002 and featured fifteen competing acts with the winner being selected through two rounds of public televoting. "I Can't Live Without Music" performed by Corinna May won after placing first in the top three during the first round of voting and ultimately gaining 41.1% of the votes in the second round.

As a member of the "Big Four", Germany automatically qualified to compete in the final of the Eurovision Song Contest. Performing in position 18, Germany placed twenty-first out of the 24 participating countries with 17 points.

== Background ==
Prior to the 2002 Contest, ARD had participated in the Eurovision Song Contest representing Germany forty-five times since its debut as one of seven countries to take part in 1956. It has won the contest on one occasion: in 1982 with the song "Ein bißchen Frieden" performed by Nicole. Germany, to this point, has been noted for having appeared in the contest more than any other country; they have competed in every contest since the first edition in 1956 except for 1996 when it was eliminated in a pre-contest elimination round. In 2001, the German entry "Wer Liebe lebt" performed by Michelle placed eighth out of twenty-three competing songs scoring 66 points.

As part of its duties as participating broadcaster, ARD organises the selection of its entry in the Eurovision Song Contest and broadcasts the event in the country. Since 1996, ARD had delegated the participation in the contest to its member Norddeutscher Rundfunk (NDR). NDR had set up national finals with several artists to choose both the song and performer to compete at Eurovision for Germany. The broadcaster organised a multi-artist national final in cooperation to select its entry for the 2002 contest.

== Before Eurovision ==
=== Countdown Grand Prix Eurovision 2002 ===
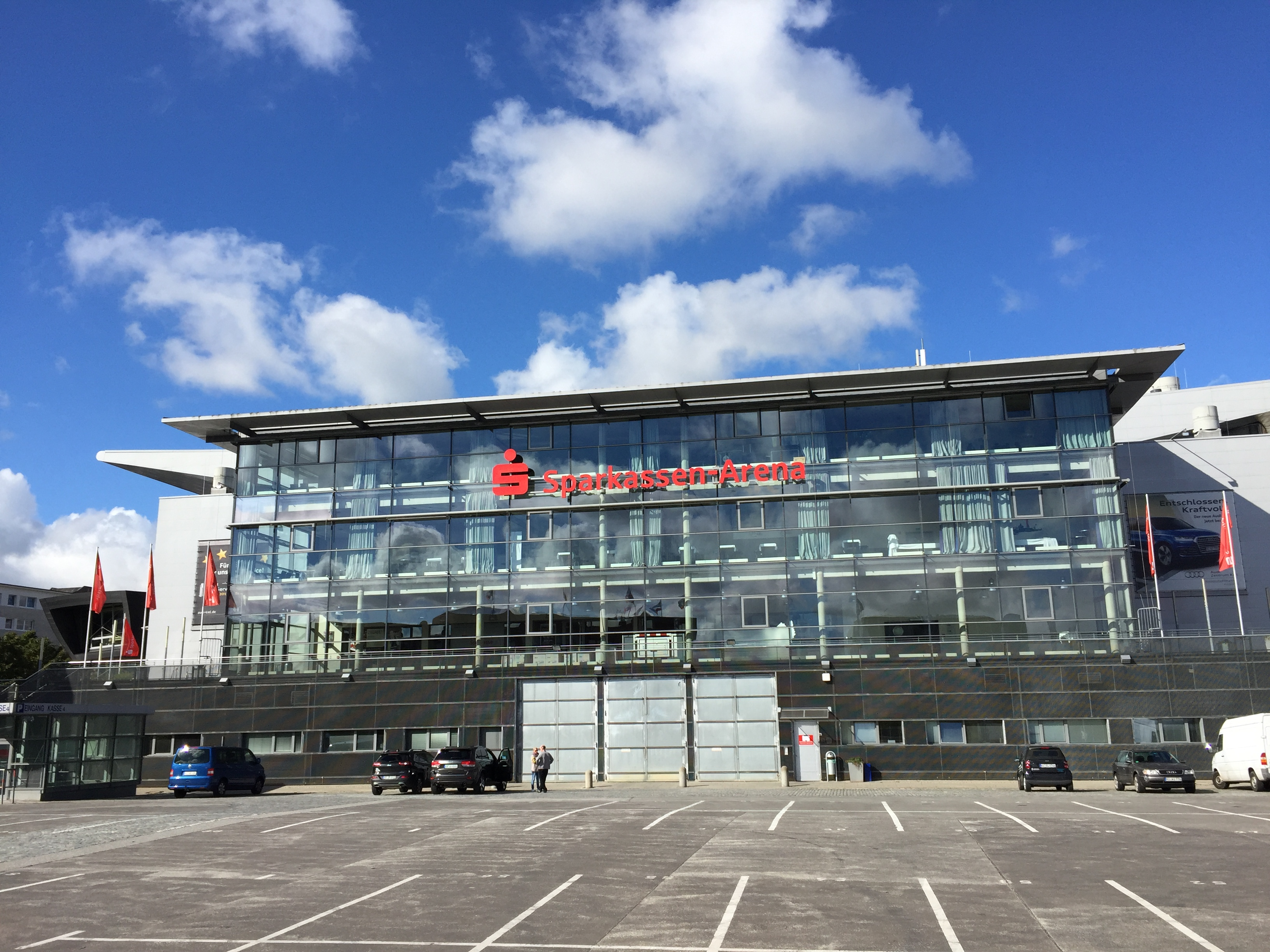
The Ostseehalle in Kiel was the host venue of Countdown Grand Prix Eurovision 2002

Countdown Grand Prix Eurovision 2002 was the competition organised by NDR to select its entry for the Eurovision Song Contest 2002. It took place on 22 February 2002 at the Ostseehalle in Kiel, hosted by Axel Bulthaupt and broadcast on Das Erste. Fifteen acts competed during the show with the winner being selected through a public televote. The national final was watched by 9.75 million viewers in Germany with a market share of 38.2%.

==== Competing entries ====
14 acts were selected by a panel consisting of representatives of NDR from proposals received by the broadcaster from record companies and announced on 8 January 2002. Among the competing artists were Joy Fleming (who represented Germany in 1975), Ireen Sheer (who represented Luxembourg in 1974, Luxembourg in 1985, and Germany in 1978), and Nino de Angelo (who represented Germany in 1989). Corinna May was due to represent Germany in 1999 before being disqualified when it was discovered that her song had already been released by another singer. An additional act, Isabel Soares, was announced on 4 February 2002 after being selected through a casting round organised by German newspaper Bild among 5,000 applicants.

Artist	Song	Songwriter(s)
Corinna May	"I Can't Live Without Music"	Ralph Siegel, Bernd Meinunger
Disco Brothers feat. the Weather Girls	"Get Up, Stand Up"	Harald Reitinger, Uli Fischer
Ireen Sheer and Bernhard Brink	"Es ist niemals zu spät"	Michael Buschjahn, Jean-Pierre Valence, Bernhard Brink, Norbert Hammerschmidt
Isabel Soares	"Will My Heart Survive"	Dieter Bohlen
Joy Fleming and Jambalaya	"Joy to the World"	Jason Homan, Hans Steingen
Linda Carriere	"Higher Ground"	Ali Neander, Linda Carriere, Lisa Cash
Mundstuhl	"Fleisch"	Lars Niedereichholz, Ande Werner
Natalie	"Don’t Say Goodbye"	Jan Löchel, Vincent Sorg
Nino de Angelo	"Und wenn du lachst"	Andreas Fahner, Hartmut Krech, Mark Nissen
Normal Generation	"Hold On"	Simon Veigel, Steve Waidelich, Judy Bailey
SPN-X	"Bravo Punk"	Alexander Muth
The Kelly Family	"I Wanna Be Loved"	The Kelly Family
Tuesdays	"Du bist mein Weg"	Gino Trovatello, Matthias Stingl
Unity 2	"You Never Walk Alone"	Klaus Dehr, Peter Voll, Eckhard Horst
Zarah	"To Be or Not to Be"	Guido Craveiro, Johannes Kram, Michael Holm

==== Final ====
The televised final took place on 22 February 2002. The winner was selected through two rounds of public televoting. In the first round of voting, the top three entries were selected to proceed to the second round. The top three entries were. In the second round, the winner, "I Can't Live Without Music" performed by Corinna May, was selected. In addition to the performances of the competing entries, the interval acts featured Guildo Horn (who represented Germany in 1998), the German music duo Modern Talking, the Australian music ensemble The Ten Tenors, and the German group Schiller performing their song "Ein schöner Tag" together with German singer Isgaard.

First Round – 22 February 2002
R/O	Artist	Song	Televote	Place
1	Disco Brothers feat. the Weather Girls	"Get Up, Stand Up"	—	13
2	Normal Generation	"Hold On"	12%	3
3	Nino de Angelo	"Und wenn du lachst"	—	9
4	Unity 2	"You Never Walk Alone"	—	15
5	Mundstuhl	"Fleisch"	—	11
6	Isabel Soares	"Will My Heart Survive"	—	6
7	Linda Carriere	"Higher Ground"	—	12
8	SPN-X	"Bravo Punk"	—	8
9	Zarah	"To Be or Not to Be"	—	14
10	Ireen Sheer and Bernhard Brink	"Es ist niemals zu spät"	—	7
11	The Kelly Family	"I Wanna Be Loved"	—	4
12	Tuesdays	"Du bist mein Weg"	—	10
13	Corinna May	"I Can't Live Without Music"	19.5%	1
14	Natalie	"Don’t Say Goodbye"	—	5
15	Joy Fleming and Jambalaya	"Joy to the World"	14%	2

Second Round – 22 February 2002
R/O	Artist	Song	Televote	Place
1	Normal Generation	"Hold On"	26.4%	3
2	Corinna May	"I Can't Live Without Music"	41.1%	1
3	Joy Fleming and Jambalaya	"Joy to the World"	32.5%	2

== At Eurovision ==
As a member of the "Big Four", Germany automatically qualified to compete in the Eurovision Song Contest 2002 on 25 May 2002. During the allocation draw on 9 November 2001, Germany was drawn to perform in position 18, following the entry from France and before the entry from Turkey. At the conclusion of the final, Germany placed twenty-first in the final, scoring 17 points.

In Germany, the show was broadcast on Das Erste which featured commentary by Peter Urban. The show was watched by 10.02 million viewers in Germany, which meant a market share of 38.4 per cent. NDR appointed Axel Bulthaupt as its spokesperson to announce the top 12-point score awarded by the German televote.

=== Voting ===
Below is a breakdown of points awarded to Germany and awarded by Germany in the contest. The nation awarded its 12 points to Latvia in the contest.

Points awarded to Germany
Score	Country
12 points	
10 points	
8 points	
7 points	
6 points	
5 points	
4 points	Malta
3 points	Switzerland; Turkey
2 points	Russia; Spain
1 point	Austria; Estonia; Romania

Points awarded by Germany
Score	Country
12 points	Latvia
10 points	Malta
8 points	United Kingdom
7 points	Spain
6 points	France
5 points	Israel
4 points	Estonia
3 points	Croatia
2 points	Switzerland
1 point	Romania
