= Mălina Olinescu =

Romanian singer (1974–2011)

- Born: 29 January 1974; Bucharest, Socialist Republic of Romania
- Died: 12 December 2011 (aged 37) Bucharest, Romania
- Occupation: Singer
- Years active: 1996–2011

Mălina Olinescu (Romanian pronunciation: [məˈlina oliˈnesku]; 29 January 1974 – 12 December 2011) was a Romanian singer who represented Romania at the Eurovision Song Contest 1998 with the song "Eu cred".

== Early life ==
Olinescu was born in Bucharest to singer Doina Spătaru and actor Boris Olinescu.

She began participating in music festivals at the age of five and became nationally known after joining the television show Școala Vedetelor in 1996.

== Career ==
Olinescu represented Romania in the Eurovision Song Contest 1998 in Birmingham, United Kingdom, with the song "Eu cred", finishing 22nd with six points.

She won awards at the Mamaia Music Festival and Cerbul de Aur, and later collaborated with Romanian Television (TVR).

In addition to her music career, she participated in several television projects during the 2000s.

== Personal life ==
Olinescu was previously in a relationship with musician Călin Geambașu.

She died in Bucharest on 12 December 2011, aged 37.

Awards and achievements
Preceded by Dan Bittman with "Dincolo de nori"	Romania in the Eurovision Song Contest; 1998	Succeeded by Taxi with "The Moon"
Preceded by Monica Anghel & Sincron with "Rugă pentru pacea lumii"	Winner of Selecţia Naţională; 1998	Succeeded by Taxi with "The Moon"
