= Spitalul de Urgență =

Romanian rock band

Spitalul de Urgenţă, literally "The Emergency Hospital", is a Romanian rock band, integrating elements of traditional Romanian music into a sometimes hard-edged rock sound, although also incorporating influences as diverse as Balkan folk music, European classical music, and cartoon soundtrack music.

The group was formed 2000 in Bucharest. Spitalul de Urgenţă is also the Romanian title of the American television show ER, but band leader Dan Helciug says that the name actually derived from a time they were playing a concert and "all the musicians arrived injured… we looked like a band from a hospital." Helciug has now worked with quite a range of musicians and continues to release music in this style under the name Spitalul de Urgenţă more or less regardless of exactly who he is playing with. He also plays in the more rock oriented band Nod, which he describes as a blend of Rammstein, Depeche Mode and Korn.

Helciug's lyrics often feature a bitter wit that does not lend itself to easy translation, especially because of his tendency to paraphrase (both musically and lyrically) pieces of well known traditional songs. For example, the chorus of their song "Trăiască Berea" ("Long Live Beer") uses a phrase from a traditional song, "Foaie verde şi-o lalea" ("Green leaf and a tulip"):

Trăiască berea in care ne-am născut
Traiăscă berea că tare ne-a durut
Foaie verde şi-o lalea
Fie pâinea cât de rea
Chiar aici in ţara ta
Tot ţi-o fură cineva.

- "Trăiască berea", Dan Helciug

Long live beer in which we were born
Long live beer, for we've suffered much
Green leaf and a tulip
However bad the bread may be
Even here in your own country
Someone will steal it [the bread] from you.

- "Long live beer", Dan Helciug

The album Alcool Rafinat ("Refined Alcohol", 2005) includes a number of covers and parodies including a reworking of the Judas Priest song "Breaking the Law" as "Caut un bou" ("Looking for an Ox"), in which a cow wanders through Bucharest looking for love, and a more straightforward translation of the Tiger Lillies' song "Whore" as "Curva".

== Band members ==
=== Original lineup ===
- Dan Helciug (vocals)
- Viorel Preda
- Adrian Chepa (bass)
- Catalin Dalvarea

=== Other members ===
- Emil Chican (guitar)
- Vladimir Sergeyev (drums)
- Vali Craciunescu (accordion)
- Claudiu Stoica (ţambal)

== Discography ==
- Trăiască Berea (2000, EP)
- Să Cânte Muzica! (2001?)
- Spitalomania (2002)
- Stupefiant (2004)
- Alcool Rafinat (2005)
- F.P.S. (2009)
- Bua Bua (2013)

=== Dan Helciug solo ===
- "HeArt" (2016)
