= Corinna May =

German singer (born 1970)

Corinna May (born 6 October 1970 in Bremen, Germany as Corinna Meyer) is a blind singer. She represented Germany in the Eurovision Song Contest 2002 with the song "I Can't Live Without Music".

== Career ==
From an early age she was interested in music due to her father's love of jazz. She also sang in a school choir and a gospel choir. After several talent competitions, May could release her first album in 1997; a jazz album, produced by herself. Two years later, she released an album called Wie ein Stern (Like a Star).

Her final breakthrough came in 1999 with the German preselections for the Eurovision Song Contest. She won, but her song “Hör den Kindern einfach zu” ("Just listen to the children") was disqualified because it was already released on an album by someone else. Her second try was in 2000 with the song “I Believe in God”, which finished in second place.

She entered again in 2002 and this time won with a definite place in the final. With the song “I Can’t Live Without Music” she represented Germany in the Eurovision Song Contest 2002. She was not very successful however, reaching 21st place.

In March 2006, she made a guest appearance at that year's German Eurovision preselection, singing “I Can’t Live Without Music” in a medley of past German Eurovision entries. She also accompanied comedian Hape Kerkeling in a rendition of Italian Eurovision winning song “Insieme”. In October 2006, the album Jetzt wie noch nie was released. Following this, she was released from her recording contract due to poor sales.

== Discography ==
=== Albums ===
- 1996 Jazz Art - Soul Songs (Rafael Jung Trio feat. Corinna Meyer)
- 1999 Wie ein Stern
- 2001 Hör den Kindern einfach zu (Compilation)
- 2002 I Can't Live Without Music
- 2006 Jetzt wie noch nie
- 2010 Meine Besten (Compilation)

=== Notable songs and projects ===
- 1999 "Hör den Kindern einfach zu" (reached #59 in Germany, 1st in German preselection for ESC)
- 1999 "Frieden allezeit", duet with Claudia Jung
- 2000 "Does He Love You", duet with Reba McEntire
- 2000 "I Believe in God" (2nd in German preselection for ESC)
- 2002 "I Can't Live Without Music" (reached #72 in Germany, 1st in German preselection for ESC)
- 2004 German soundtrack for Disney's Die Kühe sind los (original title: Home on the Range)
- 2006 "Bleib einfach steh'n" (reached #6 in German Airplay Charts)
- 2009 "Dreamin' River" (participated in the internal German preselection for ESC)

Preceded by Michelle with Wer Liebe lebt	Germany in the Eurovision Song Contest; 2002	Succeeded by Lou with Let's Get Happy
