= Marcel Pavel =

Romanian singer

Marcel Pavel (Romanian pronunciation: [marˈtʃel ˈpavel]; born 4 December 1959 in Galați County) is a folk music singer in Romania. His singing talents brought him to the top of the Romanian charts more than once. In 2002, Marcel was elected as The best male voice. His first hit was "Frumoasa mea" by Ovidiu Komornyc. His latest album is Te vreau langa mine. His song "Unde esti?", was chosen as the best song in 2001.

In 2002, he won the national selections for the Eurovision Song Contest together with Monica Anghel. Their song "Tell Me Why" reached ninth place, the best score ever for Romania at that time.

Pavel was also chosen to dub the singing voice of Claude Frollo from the animated movie The Hunchback of Notre Dame.

== See also ==
- Music of Romania

Preceded by Taxi with "The Moon"	Romania in the Eurovision Song Contest; 2002 (with Monica Anghel)	Succeeded by Nicoleta Alexandru with "Don't Break My Heart"
Preceded by Taxi with "The Moon"	Winner of Selecţia Naţională; 2002 (with Monica Anghel)	Succeeded by Nicoleta Alexandru with "Don't Break My Heart"
