= Krypton (band) =

Romanian rock band

Krypton (or Kripton)
- Origin: Bucharest, Romania
- Genres: new wave (early); Hard rock; heavy metal; pop rock (2001–2012)
- Years active: 1982–present
- Labels: Electrecord, Transglobal EMI, and Media Services
- Members: Eugen Mihăescu; Dragoș Moldovan; Claudiu Macarie; Humberto Miquilena

Krypton is a Romanian rock band formed in 1982 by Eugen Mihăescu.

== History ==
With the original line-up consisting of Eugen Mihăescu (guitars), Gabriel Golescu (guitar), Mihai Rotaru (drums) and George Lungu (bass), they managed to release their first songs on the Romanian state sanctioned Electrecord label's, "Formații rock 7" compilation in 1982.

Following a major line-up change, bass player Dragoș Docan, drummer Liviu Pop and vocalist Marius Voicu join the band, laying the foundation for the more well-known group. After being invited to numerous events, even securing a slot at the famous Cenaclul Flacăra, the group managed to sign a deal with Electrecord, releasing their first LP, "30 minute". Their sound at this time was keyboard driven new wave inspired melodic hard rock.

During the summer of 1989, founding member Eugen Mihăescu fled to Germany, so he only participated as a guest on the 1990 record "Fără Teamă", even though he composed a good portion of the material. This LP shows the first signs of the heavy metal influenced style which the band later became known for.

By 1991, Eugen Mihăescu returned to the band, and they finished recording their most ambitious project, the rock opera "Lanțurile", which was released as a double LP. The album features a full on heavy metal sound, and deals with the theme of the Romanian Revolution.

In 1993, Mihăescu leaves Krypton once again, deciding to focus on a solo career. The rest of the group continues to have sporadic activity throughout the 90's, even releasing the full-length album "Am dormit prea mult" in 1998, before eventually splitting up in 1999.

In 2000, Eugen Mihăescu re-establishes the group with a new line-up including vocalist Răzvan Fodor. The release of the 2001 record "Comercial" marks the beginning of a new era for the ensemble. They opted for a cleaner pop rock oriented sound. The next 10 years were a period of commercial success, they released three further albums, and spawned numerous hit-singles in Romania, like "Îţi mai aduci aminte" or "Cerceii tăi".

In 2012, Eugen Mihăescu decides to regroup the band's classic line-up, with old members Gabi "Guriță" Nicolau on vocals and Dragoș Docan on bass. The band continues to perform concerts sporadically throughout Romania, playing songs from their old hard rock catalogue.

In 2022 a regrouping creates the line-up Eugen Mihăescu (guitars), Humberto Miquilena (bass), Claudiu Macarie (drums) and Dragoș Moldovan (vocals, guitar). The group tours regularly in Romania, still playing songs from their repertoire.
