= Dincolo de nori =

Romanian entry in the Eurovision Song Contest 1994

Single by Dan Bittman
- Released: 1994
- Length: 3:06
- Label: Metro
- Songwriter(s): Antonio Furtuna; Dan Bittman
- Producer(s): Furtuna

Eurovision Song Contest 1994 entry
- Country: Romania
- Artist(s): Dan Bittman
- Language: Romanian
- Composer(s): Antonio Furtuna
- Lyricist(s): Antonio Furtuna; Dan Bittman

Finals performance
- Final result: 21st
- Final points: 14

Entry chronology
- "Eu cred" (1998) ►

"Dincolo de nori" (Romanian pronunciation: [ˈdiŋkolo de ˈnorʲ]; English: "Beyond the Clouds") is a song recorded by Romanian singer Dan Bittman at the Magic Sound Production in Craiova and was released as a CD single in 1994 by Metro Records Romania. "Dincolo de nori" was written by Antonio Furtuna and Bittman and produced solely by Furtuna, featuring a bass guitar, harmonica and keyboards in its instrumentation.

The track represented Romania in the Eurovision Song Contest 1994 (held in Dublin, Ireland) after winning the pre-selection show Selecția Națională. In Dublin, Romania made its debut in the contest and finished in 21st place with 14 points. One year after the event, "Dincolo de nori" was awarded Song of the Year by Romanian magazine Actualitatea muzicală. The song was re-recorded in 1998 by Bittman and his group Holograf for their 12th studio album Supersonic.

The song was succeeded as Romanian representative at the 1998 Contest by Mălina Olinescu with the song "Eu cred"..

== Background and release ==
"Dincolo de nori" was written by Antonio Furtuna and Dan Bittman, while production was solely handled by Furtuna. It was recorded and mixed at Magic Sound Production in Craiova, Romania by Furtuna and Radu Negru, respectively. The song featured several instruments in its instrumentation, including a bass guitar played by Eugen Tegu, keyboards by Furtuna and harmonica by Bittman. Corina Dogaru, Geanina Olaru, Mariana Țurcanu and Daniela Vlădescu were hired as backing vocalists to complement lead vocals performed by Bittman. A CD of "Dincolo de nori" was released in 1994, containing the tracks "When the Love Was In" and "Mother Mary" on different sides. Its cover was designed by Hary Dumitrescu and photographed by Adrian Popescu. In 1998, "Dincolo de nori" was re-recorded by Bittman and his band Holograf for their 12th studio album Supersonic.

== At Eurovision ==
On 20 March 1994, the Selecția Națională (National Selection) was held in order to select the Romanian entrant for the Eurovision Song Contest 1994. "Dincolo de nori" was chosen after the votes of five regional professional jury panels were combined. The Eurovision Song Contest 1994 took place at the Point Theatre in Dublin, Ireland, and the finals were held on 30 April 1994. According to the then-Eurovision rules, selected countries were picked to participate in the final. In 1994, Romania debuted in the contest and qualified for the final, where Bittman performed in 11th place, preceded by Estonia and followed by Malta. Romania came in 21st position in a field of 25 with 14 points — six awarded by Malta and Greece, and two from Lithuania. The Romanian jury awarded its 12 points to Germany.

== Track listing ==
- Romanian CD single
1. "Dincolo de nori" – 3:06
2. "When the Love Was In" – 3:06
3. "Mother Mary" – 2:36
4. "When the Love Was In" – 3:04

== Credits and personnel ==
Credits adapted from the liner notes of the CD single.

Management

- Published by Metro Records Romania
- Recorded and mixed at Magic Sound Production (Craiova, Romania)

Personnel

- Dan Bittman – lead vocals, composer, harmonica
- Corina Dogaru – backing vocals
- Antonio Furtuna – composer, producer, keyboards
- Geanina Olaru – backing vocals
- Eugen Tegu – bass guitar
- Mariana Țurcanu – backing vocals
- Daniela Vlădescu – backing vocals

== Release history ==
Country	Date	Format	Label
Romania	N/A 1994	CD single	Metro
