= Eu cred =

1998 song performed by Mălina Olinescu

Single by Mălina Olinescu
- B-side: "You Live"
- Released: 1998
- Length: 3:03
- Label: Mega
- Songwriter: Liliana Ștefan
- Producer: Adrian Romcescu

Eurovision Song Contest 1998 entry
- Country: Romania
- Artist: Mălina Olinescu
- Language: Romanian
- Composer: Adrian Romcescu
- Lyricist: Liliana Ștefan
- Conductor: Romcescu

Finals performance
- Final result: 22nd
- Final points: 6

Entry chronology
- ◄ "Dincolo de nori" (1994)
- "The Moon" (2000) ►

"Eu cred" (English: "I believe") is a song recorded by Romanian singer Mălina Olinescu. It was recorded at the TVR Music Studio in Bucharest, and was released as a CD single in 1998 by Mega Music in Romania. The release also contained "You Live", the English-language version of the song. "Eu cred" was written by Liliana Ștefan, while production was handled by Adrian Romcescu.

The track represented Romania in the Eurovision Song Contest 1998 in Birmingham, United Kingdom after winning the pre-selection show Selecția Națională. In Birmingham, Romania automatically qualified to the final due to their relegation in the previous year and finished in 22nd place with six points. This remains one of Romania's worst results ever in the contest. Commercially, "Eu cred" failed to impact any national chart.

== Background and release ==
"Eu cred" was written by Liliana Ștefan, while production was handled by Adrian Romcescu. It was recorded by Mălina Olinescu at the TVR Music Studio in Bucharest, Romania, and engineered by Dani Constantin. Olinescu had previously risen to significant fame in Romania after competing in native TV music show Școala Vedetelor in 1996. A CD single of "Eu cred" was released in 1998 by Mega Music in Romania, containing "You Live", the English-language version of the track, on its B-side. The CD came with a booklet featuring lyrics to both versions. Adrian Ștefănescu was credited for artists and repertoire (A&R) services.

== At Eurovision ==
On 14 March 1998, the Selecția Națională was held in order to select the Romanian entrant for the Eurovision Song Contest 1998. Subsequently, "Eu cred" was chosen after the votes of four regional jury panels, an expert jury panel and televoting results were combined; Olinescu had come second with the televotes. The Eurovision Song Contest 1998 took place at the Arena Birmingham in Birmingham, United Kingdom and consisted of the final on 9 May 1998. According to the then-Eurovision rules, selected countries were picked to participate in the final, including the host country. In 1998, Romania automatically qualified to the final due to their relegation in the previous year; Olinescu performed in 15th place, preceded by Portugal and followed by the United Kingdom. Her show used orchestral accompaniment conducted by maestro Romcescu. Romania eventually came in 22nd position with six points awarded by Israel, which remains one of the country's lowest placements ever in the contest. The Romanian jury awarded its 12 points to the United Kingdom.

=== Voting ===
Points awarded to Romania
Score	Country
12 points	
10 points	
8 points	
7 points	
6 points	Israel
5 points	
4 points	
3 points	
2 points	
1 point	

Points awarded by Romania
Score	Country
12 points	United Kingdom
10 points	Poland
8 points	Ireland
7 points	Israel
6 points	Germany
5 points	Slovenia
4 points	Cyprus
3 points	Republic of Macedonia
2 points	Turkey
1 point	Hungary

== Track listing ==
- Romanian CD single
1. "Eu cred" – 3:03
2. "You Live" – 3:00

== Credits and personnel ==
Credits adapted from the liner notes of the CD single.

Management

- Published by Mega Music
- Recorded at Studioul muzical al TVR (Bucharest, Romania)

Personnel

- Mălina Olinescu – lead vocals
- Dani Constantin – engineer
- Adrian Romcescu – producer
- Liliana Ștefan – composer
- Adrian Ștefănescu – artists and repertoire (A&R)

== Release history ==
Country	Date	Format	Label
Romania	1998	CD single	Mega
