= Il faut du temps =

2002 single by Sandrine François

Single by Sandrine François

from the album Et si le monde...
- Released: 27 May 2002
- Recorded: 2002
- Genre: Pop-rock; Euro-pop
- Length: 3:56
- Label: BMG
- Composers: Rick Allison; Patrick Bruel
- Lyricists: Patrick Bruel; Marie-Florence Gros
- Producer: Erick Benzi

Sandrine François singles chronology
"Il faut du temps" (2002)	"Celui de trop" (2003)

Eurovision Song Contest 2002 entry
- Country: France
- Artist: Sandrine François
- Language: French

Finals performance
- Final result: 5th
- Final points: 104

Entry chronology
- ◄ "Je n'ai que mon âme" (2001)
- "Monts et merveilles" (2003) ►

"Il faut du temps", also known under the full title "Il faut du temps (Je me battrai pour ça)" (French pronunciation: [il fo dy tɑ̃ ʒə mə batʁe puʁ sa]; "It takes time (I will fight for that)"), was the French entry in the Eurovision Song Contest 2002, performed in French by Sandrine François. The song was co-written by French singer Patrick Bruel, and produced by Erick Benzi.

The song was also released in English under the title "After the Rain".

== Composition ==
The song is an upbeat ballad in which Sandrine François explains that everything good in life takes time, and that she is prepared to fight to achieve her goals. The composition has been compared to the likes of ballads performed by Celine Dion, pointing to the fact that Erick Benzi, the song's producer, is responsible for producing many of Dion's songs and hits.

== At the Eurovision Song Contest ==
The full song is nearly four minutes long, but was shortened to abide by Eurovision rules. The song was performed seventeenth on the night, following Belgium's Sergio & The Ladies with "Sister" and preceding Germany's Corinna May with "I Can't Live Without Music". At the close of voting, it had received 104 points, placing 5th in a field of 24.

In 2015 The Independent's Rachael Pells placed the song among a list of 10 songs that should've won the contest, but didn't.

It was succeeded as French representative at the 2003 contest by Louisa Baïleche with "Monts et merveilles".

== Track listing ==
All songs were produced by Erick Benzi.

CD single
No.	Title	Lyrics	Music	Length
1.	"Il faut du temps (Je me battrai pour ça)"	Patrick Bruel, Marie-Florence Gros	Patrick Bruel, Rick Allison	3:56
2.	"Comme une étincelle"	Erick Benzi	Erick Benzi	3:38
Total length:				7:36

CD maxi
No.	Title	Lyrics	Music	Length
1.	"Il faut du temps (Je me battrai pour ça)"	Patrick Bruel, Marie-Florence Gros	Patrick Bruel, Rick Allison	3:56
2.	"After the Rain"	Janey Clewer, Patrick Bruel, Marie-Florence Gros	Patrick Bruel, Rick Allison	3:56
3.	"Comme une étincelle"	Erick Benzi	Erick Benzi	3:38
Total length:				11:30

== Charts ==
Chart performance for "Il faut du temps"
Chart (2002)	Peak position
France (SNEP)	24
France (IFOP)	29
Belgium (Ultratop 50 Wallonia)	32
