= The Moon (song) =

2000 single by Taxi

Single by Taxi
- B-side: "Luna"
- Released: 2000
- Genre: Pop rock • folk rock
- Length: 2:58
- Label: Intercont
- Songwriter: Dan Teodorescu
- Producer: Teodorescu

Taxi singles chronology
"Aici sunt banii dumneavoastră" (2000)	"The Moon" (2000)	"Doi zero zero zero" (2000)

Eurovision Song Contest 2000 entry
- Country: Romania
- Artists: Dan Teodorescu; Georgiana Pană; Lucian Cioargă; Adrian Borțun; George Pătrănoiu
- As: Taxi
- Language: English
- Composer: Dan Teodorescu
- Lyricist: Teodorescu

Finals performance
- Final result: 17th
- Final points: 25

Entry chronology
- ◄ "Eu cred" (1998)
- "Tell Me Why" (2002) ►

"The Moon" is a song recorded by Romanian group Taxi. It was released as a CD single in 2000 by Intercont Music in Romania, containing its Romanian-language version "Luna" as a B-side. "The Moon" was written and produced solely by Teodorescu. It represented Romania in the Eurovision Song Contest 2000 in Stockholm, Sweden, after "Luna" won the pre-selection show Selecția Națională. It is the first Romanian entry in Eurovision history to be performed entirely in English. In Stockholm, Romania automatically qualified to the final due to their relegation in the previous year and finished in 17th place with 25 points.

== Background and release ==
Taxi is a Romanian band formed in 1999, consisting of lead vocalist Dan Teodorescu, Lucian Cioargă, Adrian Borțun, George Pătrănoiu and Georgiana Pană. The group rose to fame in their native country after the commercial success of the two singles "Criogenia salvează România" (1999) and "Aici sunt banii dumneavoastră" (2000), as well as because of their controversial lyrics. A CD single of "The Moon" was released in 2000 by Intercont Music in Romania, further containing "Luna", the Romanian-language version of the song; both tracks last for two minutes and 58 seconds. "The Moon" was written and produced solely by Teodorescu.

== At Eurovision ==
=== National selection ===
On 27 February 2000, the Selecția Națională song contest was held in order to select the Romanian entrant for the Eurovision Song Contest. Subsequently, "Luna" was chosen to represent Romania in the contest solely by public televoting. Originally, the span of time in which the public could vote for entries was set to one hour, and eventually extended to three hours without prior announcement. Taxi's win was surrounded by controversy after second-placed Romanian group Valahia (band) threatened to take legal action against the Romanian Television (TVR), claiming that they were in the lead after one hour of televoting.

=== In Stockholm ===
The Eurovision Song Contest 2000 took place at the Ericsson Globe in Stockholm, Sweden and consisted of the final on 13 May 2000. According to the then-Eurovision rules, selected countries were picked to participate in the final, including the host country and the "Big Four" (France, Germany, Spain and the United Kingdom). In 2000, Romania automatically qualified to the final due to their relegation in the previous year. Taxi performed "The Moon" in sixth place, preceded by France and followed by Malta. During their show, lead singer Teodorescu sang and played the guitar on a chair, while accompanied by an electric guitar and a pan flute played by fellow members. Romania eventually placed in 17th position with 25 points, including 12 awarded by Macedonia, seven from Croatia and six from Russia. The Romanian jury awarded its 12 points to Russia.

== Track listing ==
- Romanian CD single
1. "Luna" (The Moon) [English version] – 2:58
2. "Luna" (The Moon) [Romanian version] – 2:58

== Release history ==
Country	Date	Format	Label
Romania	N/A 2000	CD single	Intercont
