= Gimme (One song) =

2002 song by One

Single by One

from the album Έχω Τόσα Να Σου Πω
- Released: 2002
- Length: 3:03
- Label: Minos EMI
- Songwriter: Giorgos Theofanous

Music video
- "Gimme" on YouTube

Eurovision Song Contest 2002 entry
- Country: Cyprus
- Artists: Constantinos Christoforou; Panos Tserpes; Dimitris Koutsavlakis; Philippos Constantinos; Argyris Nastopoulos
- As: One
- Language: English
- Composer: Giorgos Theofanous
- Lyricist: Giorgos Theofanous

Finals performance
- Final result: 6th
- Final points: 85

Entry chronology
- ◄ "Nomiza" (2000)
- "Feeling Alive" (2003) ►

"Gimme" is a song recorded by Cypriot boy band One, written by Giorgos Theofanous. It represented Cyprus in the Eurovision Song Contest 2002, placing sixth.

== Background ==
=== Conception ===
"Gimme" was written by Giorgos Theofanous. It is a boy band number, with a girl being asked to give a sign that she loves the singer.

=== Eurovision ===
In late 2001, the Cyprus Broadcasting Corporation (CyBC) internally selected the boy band One as its performer for the 47th edition of the Eurovision Song Contest. CyBC commissioned Theofanous to write a song especially for the occasion. He wrote "Gimme" and the band recorded it in English, Greek –as "Δεν μπορώ"–, and Spanish –as "Dame"–.

On 25 May 2002, the Eurovision Song Contest was held at the Saku Suurhall in Tallinn hosted by Eesti Televisioon (ETV), and broadcast live throughout the continent. One performed the song first on the night –accompanied by Christina Argyri as backing singer–, followed by the United Kingdom's "Come Back" by Jessica Garlick. It was the first time in the contest that the Cypriot entry did not feature any Greek lyrics as it was performed fully in English. A few seconds after the lead singer Constantinos Christoforou began singing, a technical hitch led to show a caption bearing the words 'the ugly duckling' –it was the postcard meant to be shown before the United Kingdom's performance–. The live signal from the stage was quickly brought back.

At the close of voting, it had received 85 points, placing sixth in a field of twenty-four. The song was succeeded as Cypriot entry at the 2003 contest by "Feeling Alive" by Stelios Constantas.

=== Aftermath ===
"Gimme" was included in the band's third studio album Έχω Τόσα Να Σου Πω released in May 2002. The album was certified platinum in both Greece (+50,000 copies) and Cyprus (+6,000 copies).

Christoforou had already participated for Cyprus at the Eurovision Song Contest 1996 with the song "Mono Yia Mas". He would later make a further solo appearance at the 2005 contest with "Ela Ela (Come Baby)" after the band formally disbanded. Therefore, "Gimme" represents the middle leg in a rare sequence of a Eurovision contestant performing solo, then as a member of a vocal group, before a second solo performance.

On 4 March 2015, the group reunited to perform "Gimme" as guests performers at the Greek national final for the Eurovision Song Contest 2015.

== Charts ==
Chart (2002)	Peak position
Greece (Top 50 Singles Charts)	2

== Legacy ==
=== Impersonations ===
- In the third episode of the fourth season of Your Face Sounds Familiar aired on 7 May 2017 on ANT1, Aris Makris impersonated Constantinos Christoforou singing "Gimme" replicating One's performance at Eurovision.
