= Finland in the Eurovision Song Contest 2005 =

- Eurovision Song Contest 2005
- Participating broadcaster: Yleisradio (Yle)
- Country: Finland
- Selection process: Euroviisut 2005
- Selection date: 19 February 2005

Competing entry
- Song: "Why?"
- Artist: Geir Rönning
- Songwriters: Mika Toivanen; Steven Stewart

Placement
- Semi-final result: Failed to qualify (18th)

Participation chronology

Finland was represented at the Eurovision Song Contest 2005 with the song "Why?", composed by Mika Toivanen, with lyrics by Steven Stewart, and performed by Geir Rönning. The Finnish participating broadcaster, Yleisradio (Yle), organised the national final Euroviisut 2005 to select its entry for the contest. 24 entries were selected to compete in the national final, which consisted of four semi-finals and a final, taking place in January and February 2005. Six entries competed in each semi-final and the top three from each semi-final, as selected solely by a public vote, advanced to the final. Twelve entries competed in the final on 19 February where votes from six regional juries first selected the top six to advance to a second round. In the second round, votes from the public selected "Why?" performed by Geir Rönning as the winner with 30,648 votes.

Finland competed in the semi-final of the Eurovision Song Contest which took place on 19 May 2005. Performing during the show in position 16, "Why?" was not announced among the top 10 entries of the semi-final and therefore did not qualify to compete in the final. It was later revealed that Finland placed eighteenth out of the 25 participating countries in the semi-final with 50 points.

== Background ==
Prior to the 2005 contest, Yleisradio (Yle) had participated in the Eurovision Song Contest representing Finland thirty-eight times since its first entry in 1961. Its best result in the contest achieved in 1973 where the song "Tom Tom Tom" performed by Marion Rung placed sixth.

As part of its duties as participating broadcaster, Yle organises the selection of its entry in the Eurovision Song Contest and broadcasts the event in the country. The broadcaster confirmed its intentions to participate at the 2005 contest on 22 June 2004. Yle has been selected its entries through national final competitions that have varied in format over the years. Since 1961, a selection show that was often titled Euroviisukarsinta highlighted that the purpose of the program was to select a song for Eurovision. Along with its participation confirmation, the broadcaster announced that it would select its entry for the 2005 contest through the Euroviisut selection show.

== Before Eurovision ==
=== Euroviisut 2005 ===
Euroviisut 2005 was the national final organised by Yle to select its entry for the Eurovision Song Contest 2005. The competition consisted of five shows that commenced with the first of four semi-finals on 14 January 2005 and concluded with a final on 19 February 2005. All shows were broadcast on Yle TV2 and via radio on Yle Radio Suomi and Yle Radio Vega. The final was also broadcast via radio on Yle Radio Suomi.

==== Format ====
The format of the competition consisted of five shows: four semi-finals and a final. Six songs competed in each semi-final and the top three entries from each semi-final qualified to complete the twelve-song lineup in the final. The results for the semi-finals were determined exclusively by a public vote, while the results in the final were determined by public voting and jury voting. Public voting included the options of telephone and SMS.

==== Competing entries ====
A submission period was opened by Yle which lasted between 22 June 2004 and 1 October 2004. Both the writers and singer(s) had to hold Finnish citizenship or live in Finland permanently in order for the entry to qualify to compete. Song performed in Finnish or Swedish were preferred. A panel of twelve experts appointed by Yle selected sixteen entries for the competition from a record number of 503 received submissions, while an additional eight entries came from composers directly invited by Yle: Maki Kolehmainen, Samuli Laiho, Kristian Maukonen, Petri Munck, Esa Nieminen, Sipe Santapukki, Mikko Tamminen and Arttu Peljo, and Mika Toivanen. The experts were Ilkka Talasranta (Head of Entertainment at Yle), Kjell Ekholm (Director of Entertainment at Yle FST), Jukka Haarma (Director of Popular Music at Yle Radio Suomi), Mikko Harjunpää (music director of Radio Nova), Jorma Hietamäki (music director of Yle Radio Suomi), Asko Kallonen (record producer), Hannu Korkeamäki (record producer), Pirkko Kotirinta (editor at Helsingin Sanomat), Pia Ljungman (producer at YLEXQ), Asko Murtomäki (Eurovision expert), Rainer Savander (music director of Sävelradio) and Laura Voutilainen (singer). The competing entries were presented on 1 November 2004.

Prior to the competition, "I Can't Believe It", written by Patrick Linman and Ola Larsson, was disqualified due to the song having been released on a compilation album in Sweden and replaced with the song "Kihlaus" performed by Wäinötär. The song "Du ger kärleken ett svar" performed by Geir Rönning and Nina Tapio was translated from Swedish to English and titled "My One and Only Love", while "Joo joo" performed by I'Dees was translated from Finnish to English and titled "Yeah, Yeah".

Artist	Song	Songwriter(s)
A and N	"Miss One-Night Good-Time"	Nalle Ahlstedt, Michael Ringström Nielsen
Anna Stenlund	"One More Chance"	Sipe Santapukki
Christian Forss	"Everything But Still Nothing"	Patrick Linman, Mats Persson
D'Voices	"This Is the Song"	Esa Nieminen, Jari Salonen
Elena Mady	"An Actress"	Samuli Laiho
Firevision	"The Stars Are on Our Side"	Mikko Tamminen, Arttu Peljo
Gary Revel Jr.	"You're a Star"	Mika Toivanen, Steven Stewart
Geir Rönning	"Why?"	Mika Toivanen, Steven Stewart
Geir Rönning and Nina Tapio	"My One and Only Love"	Niklas Rosström, Geir Rönning
Hanna-Riikka Siitonen	"Forever and a Day"	Hanna-Riikka Siitonen
I'Dees	"Yeah, Yeah"	Toni Nygård, Kevin Walker, Mark Odom, Lotta Svartsjö
Jennie	"Kiss Me"	Jens Smedman, Janne Hyöty
Karoliina Kallio	"I Need Somebody (Like You)"	Maki Kolehmainen, Erik Nyholm, Johan Westmar
Kentala	"Deck of Cards"	Harri Kentala, Janne Hyöty
Kimmo Kouri	"My Life, My Love"	Jukka Karppinen
Linda	"Your Lasting One"	Janne Hyöty, Jerry Lindqvist
Momocat	"Europa Europa"	Maki Kolehmainen, Tracy Lipp, Mohammed Quiat
Petri Munck	"Melody"	Petri Munck
Place-2-Go	"Kissed by a Fool"	Jens Smedman, Patrick Linman
Sanna Majuri	"Just One Kiss"	Fanny Bjurström, Janne Hyöty, Mats Tärnfors
Teddy vs. MC Chriss	"Unconditional Love"	Ressu Redford, Theodora Holm, Niko Toiskallio
Tommi Läntinen	"Mitä vaan"	Toni Nygård, Tommi Läntinen, Heikki Salo
Urban Community	"Whole Wide World"	Kristian Maukonen, Milla Alftan, Cheka Kalupala, Sengi Lukangu
Wäinötär	"Kihlaus"	Petri Savolainen, Mirka Sirkkanen

==== Semi-finals ====
The four semi-final shows took place on 14 January, 21 January, 4 February and 11 February 2005, hosted by Finnish presenters Jaana Pelkonen and Heikki Paasonen. The semi-finals took place in different cities across Finland: the Sibelius Hall in Lahti for the first semi-final, the Paviljonki in Jyväskylä for the second semi-final, Hall 994 of the Holiday Club Caribia in Turku for the third semi-final and the Kulttuurikeskus in Imatra for the fourth semi-final. The top three from the six competing entries in each semi-final qualified to the final based on the results from the public vote, which were revealed by Finland's five telephone regions along with the SMS voting results. In addition to the competing entries, Boney M, Frederik and Laura (who represented Finland in 2002) performed as the interval acts in all four semi-finals.

Semi-final 1 – 14 January 2005
R/O	Artist	Song	Televoting Regions					SMS	Total	Place
R/O	Artist	Song	North	East	Central	Southwest	South	SMS	Total	Place
1	I'Dees	"Yeah, Yeah"	17%	22%	18%	19%	19%	21%	19%	2
2	Hanna-Riikka Siitonen	"Forever and a Day"	9%	22%	14%	10%	15%	16%	14%	4
3	Place-2-Go	"Kissed by a Fool"	2%	6%	19%	32%	8%	9%	14%	5
4	A and N	"Miss One-Night Good-Time"	56%	20%	23%	20%	21%	22%	24%	1
5	Petri Munck	"Melody"	5%	12%	10%	9%	15%	13%	12%	6
6	Urban Community	"Whole Wide World"	11%	19%	16%	11%	22%	18%	17%	3

Semi-final 2 – 21 January 2005
R/O	Artist	Song	Televoting Regions					SMS	Total	Place
R/O	Artist	Song	North	East	Central	Southwest	South	SMS	Total	Place
1	Christian Forss	"Everything But Still Nothing"	7%	17%	14%	45%	22%	26%	26%	1
2	Geir Rönning and Nina Tapio	"My One and Only Love"	5%	14%	14%	11%	30%	19%	18%	4
3	Sanna Majuri	"Just One Kiss"	3%	18%	5%	2%	5%	4%	4%	6
4	Kimmo Kouri	"My Life, My Love"	76%	21%	27%	10%	17%	23%	22%	2
5	Anna Stenlund	"One More Chance"	3%	12%	29%	25%	9%	13%	18%	3
6	Momocat	"Europa Europa"	7%	17%	11%	7%	15%	15%	12%	5

Semi-final 3 – 4 February 2005
R/O	Artist	Song	Televoting Regions					SMS	Total	Place
R/O	Artist	Song	North	East	Central	Southwest	South	SMS	Total	Place
1	Linda	"Your Lasting One"	1%	5%	9%	10%	5%	5%	7%	6
2	Tommi Läntinen	"Mitä vaan"	24%	10%	10%	8%	13%	15%	12%	5
3	Jennie	"Kiss Me"	13%	17%	40%	45%	20%	20%	29%	1
4	Teddy vs. MC Chriss	"Unconditional Love"	25%	29%	16%	17%	26%	23%	21%	2
5	Elena Mady	"An Actress"	18%	21%	14%	13%	19%	20%	17%	3
6	Gary Revel Jr.	"You're a Star"	18%	18%	11%	8%	18%	17%	14%	4

Semi-final 4 – 11 February 2005
R/O	Artist	Song	Televoting Regions					SMS	Total	Place
R/O	Artist	Song	North	East	Central	Southwest	South	SMS	Total	Place
1	Wäinötär	"Kihlaus"	24%	25%	17%	9%	14%	14%	14%	4
2	Geir Rönning	"Why?"	30%	21%	39%	35%	36%	30%	34%	1
3	Kentala	"Deck of Cards"	17%	13%	14%	16%	15%	17%	16%	3
4	Karoliina Kallio	"I Need Somebody (Like You)"	8%	17%	9%	7%	19%	10%	12%	5
5	D'Voices	"This Is the Song"	9%	14%	5%	11%	6%	6%	7%	6
6	Firevision	"The Stars Are on Our Side"	12%	9%	17%	23%	10%	22%	17%	2

==== Final ====
The final took place on 19 February 2005 at the Tampere Hall in Tampere, hosted by Finnish presenters Jaana Pelkonen, Heikki Paasonen and Antero Mertaranta. The twelve entries that qualified from the preceding four semi-finals competed and the winner was selected over two rounds of voting. In the first round, the top six from the twelve competing entries qualified to the second round based on the votes of six regional juries. Each jury group distributed their points as follows: 1, 2, 4, 6, 8 and 10 points. In the second round, "Why?" performed by Geir Rönning was selected as the winner based on the results from the public vote, which were revealed by Finland's five telephone regions along with the SMS voting results. A total of 122,008 votes were cast in the superfinal: 67,257 through telephone and 54,751 through SMS. In addition to the performances of the competing entries, the show was opened by Laura (who represented Finland in 2002) performing "Imagine", and the interval act featured Frederik performing a medley of "Sheikki Ali Hassan", "Jos jotain yrittää (Harva meistä on rautaa)" and "Titanic", and Jari Sillanpää (who represented Finland in 2004) performing "Takes 2 to Tango".

First Round – 19 February 2005
R/O	Artist	Song	Regional Juries						Total	Place
R/O	Artist	Song	Oulu	Vaasa	Kuopio	Lappeenranta	Turku	Helsinki	Total	Place
1	Christian Forss	"Everything But Still Nothing"	6			1	6		13	6
2	I'Dees	"Yeah, Yeah"	8	1	1		4	4	18	5
3	Geir Rönning	"Why?"	1	8	2	8			19	4
4	A and N	"Miss One-Night Good-Time"	4	4	4				12	7
5	Firevision	"The Stars Are on Our Side"							0	11
6	Anna Stenlund	"One More Chance"						1	1	10
7	Kentala	"Deck of Cards"	10	10	6	10	2		38	1
8	Elena Mady	"An Actress"	2	2	10	2	10	10	36	2
9	Teddy vs. MC Chriss	"Unconditional Love"				4		6	10	8
10	Jennie	"Kiss Me"		6	8	6	8	2	30	3
11	Kimmo Kouri	"My Life, My Love"							0	11
12	Urban Community	"Whole Wide World"					1	8	9	9

Second Round – 19 February 2005
R/O	Artist	Song	Televoting Regions					SMS	Total	Place
R/O	Artist	Song	North	East	Central	Southwest	South	SMS	Total	Place
1	Kentala	"Deck of Cards"	600	254	3,069	2,557	4,778	11,145	22,403	2
2	Elena Mady	"An Actress"	550	331	2,881	1,788	4,166	10,491	20,207	4
3	Jennie	"Kiss Me"	297	206	4,961	5,169	3,571	8,072	22,276	3
4	Geir Rönning	"Why?"	874	351	4,847	3,692	7,619	13,265	30,648	1
5	I'Dees	"Yeah, Yeah"	448	141	1,629	1,287	2,257	5,979	11,741	6
6	Christian Forss	"Everything But Still Nothing"	292	142	1,929	3,567	3,004	5,799	14,733	5

Regional Jury Members
Jury	Members
Oulu	Marjo Harju; Tiina-Leena Kurki; Sanna Pirttisalo; Maria Perätalo; Taina Ronkainen; Kati Leinonen; Joni Pekkala; Ilpo Sulkala; Jarkko Halunen; Aki Karjalainen
Vaasa	Minna Matintupa; Hanne Leiwo; Ilpo Karinen; Antti Paalanen; Sam Jansson; Tarja Ylimäki; Jyrki Rastas; Leena Kråknäs; Sanna Känsäkangas; Erkki Ahonen
Kuopio	Petri Julkunen; Laura Kaijanen; Lasse Lindeman; Sami Vainio; Eeva Hynynen; Miika Havo; Sari Kauhanen; Jenny Metsälä; Nikke Toivanen; Marko Vettenranta
Lappeenranta	Petri Kivimäki; Tarja Nyyssönen; Olavi Spännäri; Tuula Peräkasari; Raimo Raimesalo; Lotta Koponen; Susanna Kauppi; Timo Lehtonen; Jenni Kinnunen; Juha Miettinen
Turku	Jouni Koutonen; Timo Selänne; Eeva Pekanheimo; Kari Toivonen; Oili Vainio; Anssi Kemppi; Marja-Leena Virta; Juha Leppäsalo; Jorma Lappalainen; Maria Puhakka
Helsinki	Jari Mäkäräinen; Suvi Vesalainen; Elukka Eskelinen; Outi Alander; Sanna Monto; Tero Luhtala; Laura Viljanen; Tuija Friman; Petri Anttonen; Jari Flinkman

== At Eurovision ==
According to Eurovision rules, all nations with the exceptions of the host country, the "Big Four" (France, Germany, Spain, and the United Kingdom) and the ten highest placed finishers in the 2004 contest are required to qualify from the semi-final on 19 May 2005 in order to compete for the final on 21 May 2005; the top ten countries from the semi-final progress to the final. On 22 March 2005, a special allocation draw was held which determined the running order for the semi-final and Finland was set to perform in position 16, following the entry from Hungary and before the entry from Macedonia. Geir Rönning was accompanied by Tomas Höglund, Charles Salter, Hanna-Riikka Siitonen, Nina Tapio and Mika Turunen as backing vocalists. At the end of the semi-final, Finland was not announced among the top 10 entries and therefore failed to qualify to compete in the final. It was later revealed that Finland placed eighteenth in the semi-final, receiving a total of 50 points.

The semi-final and the final were televised in Finland on Yle TV2 with commentary in Finnish by Jaana Pelkonen, Heikki Paasonen and Asko Murtomäki. The three shows were also broadcast on Yle FST with commentary in Swedish by Thomas Lundin as well as via radio with Finnish commentary by Sanna Pirkkalainen and Jorma Hietamäki on Yle Radio Suomi. Yle appointed Jari Sillanpää (who represented Finland in 2004) as its spokesperson to announced the Finnish votes during the final.

=== Voting ===
Below is a breakdown of points awarded to Finland and awarded by Finland in the semi-final and grand final of the contest. The nation awarded its 12 points to Norway in the semi-final and the final of the contest.

==== Points awarded to Finland ====
Points awarded to Finland (Semi-final)
Score	Country
12 points	
10 points	Norway; Sweden
8 points	Denmark; Estonia
7 points	
6 points	Monaco
5 points	
4 points	Germany
3 points	Andorra
2 points	
1 point	Netherlands

==== Points awarded by Finland ====
Points awarded by Finland (Semi-final)
Score	Country
12 points	Norway
10 points	Switzerland
8 points	Denmark
7 points	Slovenia
6 points	Estonia
5 points	Hungary
4 points	Romania
3 points	Moldova
2 points	Croatia
1 point	Israel

Points awarded by Finland (Final)
Score	Country
12 points	Norway
10 points	Switzerland
8 points	Malta
7 points	Russia
6 points	Sweden
5 points	Israel
4 points	Latvia
3 points	Greece
2 points	Denmark
1 point	Croatia
