= Finland in the Eurovision Song Contest 2002 =

- Eurovision Song Contest 2002
- Participating broadcaster: Yleisradio (Yle)
- Country: Finland
- Selection process: Euroviisut 2002
- Selection date: 26 January 2002

Competing entry
- Song: "Addicted to You"
- Artist: Laura
- Songwriters: Maki Kolehmainen; Janina Frostell; Tracy Lipp

Placement
- Final result: 20th, 24 points

Participation chronology

Finland was represented at the Eurovision Song Contest 2002 with the song "Addicted to You", composed by Maki Kolehmainen, with lyrics by Janina Frostell and Tracy Lipp, and performed by Laura. The Finnish participating broadcaster, Yleisradio (Yle), organised the national final Euroviisut 2002 to select its entry for the contest. The broadcaster returned to the contest after a one-year absence following their relegation from 2001 as one of the bottom six entrants in 2000. Yle selected twelve entries to compete in the national final on 26 January 2002 where votes from six regional juries first selected the top six to advance to a second round. In the second round, votes from the public selected "Addicted to You" performed by Laura as the winner with 70,580 votes.

Finland competed in the Eurovision Song Contest which took place on 25 May 2002. Performing during the show in position 13, Finland placed twentieth out of the 24 participating countries, scoring 24 points.

== Background ==
Prior to the 2002 contest, Yleisradio (Yle) had participated in the Eurovision Song Contest representing Finland thirty-six times since its first entry in 1961. Its best result in the contest achieved in 1973 where the song "Tom Tom Tom" performed by Marion Rung placed sixth.

As part of its duties as participating broadcaster, Yle organises the selection of its entry in the Eurovision Song Contest and broadcasts the event in the country. The broadcaster confirmed its intentions to participate at the 2002 contest on 18 May 2001. Yle has been selected its entries through national final competitions that have varied in format over the years. Since 1961, a selection show that was often titled Euroviisukarsinta highlighted that the purpose of the program was to select a song for Eurovision. Along with its participation confirmation, the broadcaster announced it would select its entry through the Euroviisut selection show.

== Before Eurovision ==
=== Euroviisut 2002 ===
Euroviisut 2002 was the national final organised by Yle to selecte its entry for the Eurovision Song Contest 2002. The competition consisted of a final on 26 January 2002, held at the Kaleva Centre in Tampere and hosted by Finnish journalist/presenter Maria Guzenina and Finnish presenter/comedian Simo Frangén. The show was broadcast on Yle TV2 and was watched by 1.28 million viewers in Finland.

==== Competing entries ====
A submission period was opened by Yle which lasted between 6 August 2001 and 9 November 2001. The broadcaster also directly invited record companies to submit entries. 25 entries were shortlisted from the 467 received submissions and a panel of five experts appointed by Yle ultimately selected twelve entries for the competition. The experts were Maria Guzenina (Finnish presenter and journalist at Radio Aino), Tobias Larsson (Swedish Eurovision expert), Jørgen de Mylius (Danish television and radio presenter), Marko Reikop (Estonian presenter) and Niamh White (Irish producer and director). The competing entries were presented on 29 November 2001.

Artist	Song	Songwriter(s)
Aika	"Stay"	Maki Kolehmainen, Alex Ojasti, Tracy Lipp
Geir Rönning	"I Don't Wanna Throw It All Away"	Maki Kolehmainen, Tracy Lipp
Johanna	"Who Cares About a Broken Heart"	Thomas G:son
Jussi Saxlin	"The Closest Thing to Heaven"	Toni Nygård
Laura	"Addicted to You"	Maki Kolehmainen, Janina Frostell, Tracy Lipp
Marky	"Goodbye, Hello"	Lars Diedricson, Marcos Ubeda
Ressu Redford	"Say You Will, Say You Won't"	Thomas G:son, Henrik Sethsson
Saana	"My Special One"	Sari Matala
Sheidi	"Make the Rain"	Jussi-Pekka Järvinen
Stiina Jean	"If I Do"	Risto Asikainen
Susann	"Welcome the World"	Thomas Heinonen, Nestor Geli, Susie Päivärinta
Taina Kokkonen	"Silenzio"	Pertti Haverinen, Kalevi Puonti, Tiina Pajula

==== Final ====
The final took place on 26 January 2002 where twelve entries competed and the winner was selected over two rounds of voting. In the first round, the top six from the twelve competing entries qualified to the second round based on the votes of six regional juries. Each jury group distributed their points as follows: 1, 2, 4, 6, 8 and 10 points. In the second round, "Addicted to You" performed by Laura was selected as the winner based on the results from the public vote. 193,085 votes were cast in the second round. In addition to the performances of the competing entries, the opening act featured Johnny Logan (who won Eurovision for Ireland in 1980 and in 1987) performing "Hold Me Now". Later, as an interval act, Logan performed "Taking All the Blame".

First Round – 26 January 2002
R/O	Artist	Song	Points	Place
1	Aika	"Stay"	30	2
2	Jussi Saxlin	"The Closest Thing to Heaven"	0	12
3	Johanna	"Who Cares About a Broken Heart"	23	5
4	Sheidi	"Make the Rain"	16	6
5	Geir Rönning	"I Don't Wanna Throw It All Away"	28	3
6	Laura	"Addicted to You"	46	1
7	Saana	"My Special One"	4	9
8	Marky	"Goodbye, Hello"	6	7
9	Taina Kokkonen	"Silenzio"	1	11
10	Stiina Jean	"If I Do"	3	10
11	Susann	"Welcome the World"	6	7
12	Ressu Redford	"Say You Will, Say You Won't"	23	4

Detailed Jury Voting Results
Song	Oulu	Vaasa	Kuopio	Lappeenranta	Turku	Helsinki	Total
"Stay"	6	6	8		2	8	30
"The Closest Thing to Heaven"							0
"Who Cares About a Broken Heart"	1	10		6	6		23
"Make the Rain"	8	1		1		6	16
"I Don't Wanna Throw It All Away"	2	4		8	10	4	28
"Addicted to You"		8	10	10	8	10	46
"My Special One"	4						4
"Goodbye, Hello"		2	2	2			6
"Silenzio"			1				1
"If I Do"					1	2	3
"Welcome the World"			6				6
"Say You Will, Say You Won't"	10		4	4	4	1	23

Second Round – 26 January 2002
R/O	Artist	Song	Votes	Place
1	Aika	"Stay"	39,690	2
2	Johanna	"Who Cares About a Broken Heart"	15,836	5
3	Sheidi	"Make the Rain"	8,356	6
4	Geir Rönning	"I Don't Wanna Throw It All Away"	36,183	3
5	Laura	"Addicted to You"	70,580	1
6	Ressu Redford	"Say You Will, Say You Won't"	22,440	4

== At Eurovision ==
According to Eurovision rules, all nations with the exceptions of the bottom six countries in the 2001 contest competed in the final. On 9 November 2001, a special allocation draw was held which determined the running order and Finland was set to perform in position 13, following the entry from Sweden and before the entry from Denmark. Laura was accompanied by Maria Ilmoniemi, Heidi "Sheidi" Nikkari, Gary Revel Jr. and Marika Tuhkala as backing vocalists. Finland finished in twentieth place with 24 points.

The show was televised in Finland on Yle TV2 with commentary in Finnish by Maria Guzenina and Asko Murtomäki as well as on Yle FST with commentary in Swedish by Thomas Lundin. The show was also broadcast via radio with Finnish commentary by Iris Mattila and Tarja Närhi on Yle Radio Suomi and with Swedish commentary on Yle Radio Vega.

=== Voting ===
Below is a breakdown of points awarded to Finland and awarded by Finland in the contest. The nation awarded its 12 points to France in the contest. Yle appointed Marion Rung (who represented Finland in 1962 and 1973) as its spokesperson to announce the Finnish votes during the show.

Points awarded to Finland
Score	Country
12 points	
10 points	Sweden
8 points	
7 points	
6 points	
5 points	Estonia
4 points	
3 points	Bosnia and Herzegovina; Denmark
2 points	Cyprus
1 point	Macedonia

Points awarded by Finland
Score	Country
12 points	France
10 points	Estonia
8 points	United Kingdom
7 points	Sweden
6 points	Latvia
5 points	Israel
4 points	Cyprus
3 points	Russia
2 points	Malta
1 point	Macedonia
