= Eurovision Song Contest 2002 =

International song competition

- A Modern Fairytale

Date and venue
- Final: 25 May 2002
- Venue: Saku Suurhall; Tallinn, Estonia

Organisation
- Organiser: European Broadcasting Union (EBU)
- Scrutineer: Christine Marchal-Ortiz

Production
- Host broadcaster: Eesti Televisioon (ETV)
- Director: Marius Bratten
- Executive producer: Juhan Paadam
- Presenters: Annely Peebo; Marko Matvere

Participants
- Number of entries: 24
- Returning countries: Austria; Belgium; Cyprus; Finland; Macedonia; Romania; Switzerland
- Non-returning countries: Iceland; Ireland; Netherlands; Norway; Poland; Portugal
- Participation map: Competing countries Relegated countries unable to participate due to poor results in previous contests Countries that participated in the past but not in 2002

Vote
- Voting system: Each country awards 1-8, 10, and 12 points to their 10 favourite countries
- Winning song: Latvia; "I Wanna"

The Eurovision Song Contest 2002 was the 47th edition of the Eurovision Song Contest, held on 25 May 2002 at the Saku Suurhall in Tallinn, Estonia, and presented by Annely Peebo and Marko Matvere. It was organised by the European Broadcasting Union (EBU) and host broadcaster Eesti Televisioon (ETV), who staged the event after winning the 2001 contest for Estonia with the song "Everybody" by Tanel Padar, Dave Benton and 2XL. It was the first Eurovision Song Contest held in one of the former Soviet republics.

Broadcasters from twenty-four countries participated in the contest. Austria, Belgium, Cyprus, Finland, Macedonia, Romania, and Switzerland returned after their relegation from the previous edition. Iceland, Ireland, Netherlands, Norway, and Poland were relegated due to their poor results in 2001. It was the first (and only) time Ireland and Norway were relegated from the contest. Latvia was also set to sit out this year, but when Portugal announced their non-participation, due to internal problems at its broadcaster, it left a spot open for Latvia to take, as the country had finished higher the year before than any of the other relegated countries.

The winner was Latvia with the song "I Wanna", performed by Marie N, who wrote it alongside Marats Samauskis, giving the baltic state its first win ever. Malta, the United Kingdom, Estonia, and France rounded out the top five. Malta achieved their best result in their Eurovision history, coming second. Further down the table, Denmark finished twenty-fourth and last, their worst result up until that point, despite having been declared one of the favourites to win the competition beforehand.

== Location ==
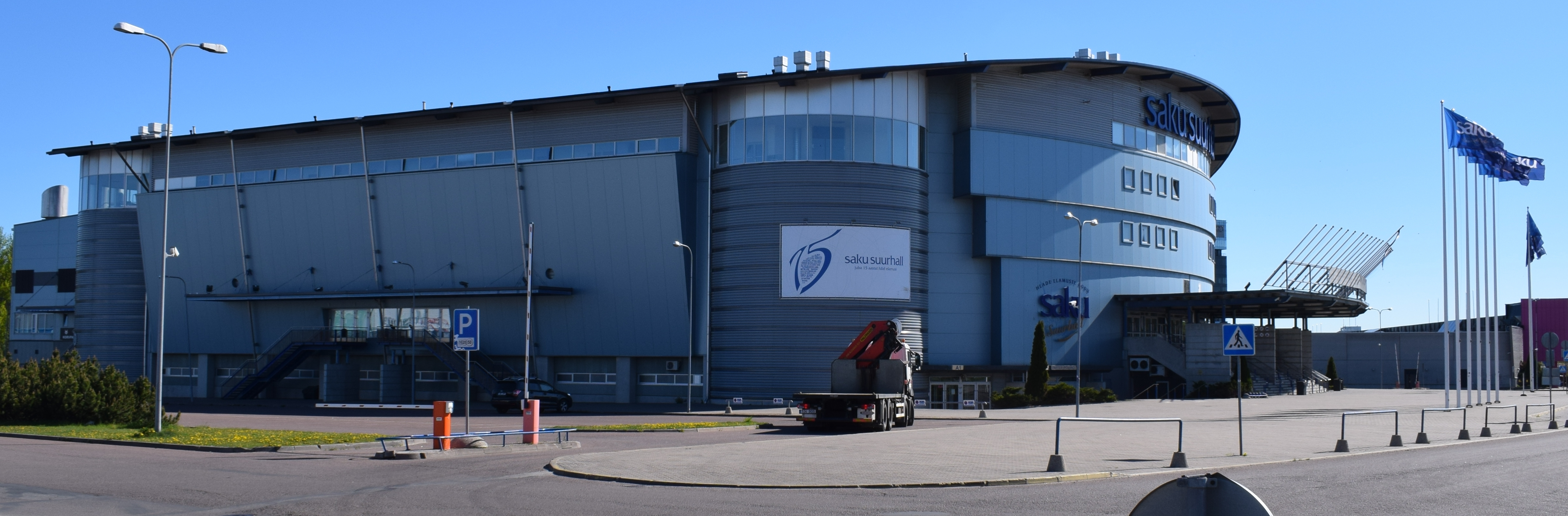
Saku Suurhall, Tallinn – host venue of the 2002 contest.

Tallinn is the capital and largest city of Estonia. It is situated on the northern coast of the country, on the shore of the Gulf of Finland, 80 km (50 mi) south of Helsinki in Finland. Tallinn's Old Town is one of the best preserved and intact medieval cities in Europe and is listed as a UNESCO World Heritage Site.

=== Venue ===
Early in the proceedings, media outlets had begun speculating whether Eesti Televisioon (ETV) would be able to host the contest, citing a lack of a suitable venue and budgetary concerns. Due to this, Maltese broadcaster Public Broadcasting Services (PBS) and Dutch broadcaster Nederlandse Omroep Stichting (NOS) both expressed interest in hosting the event in their respective countries instead of Estonia. However, worries were put to rest when a combination of fundraising activities and the Estonian Government enabled them to host the event.

On 19 June 2001, it was announced that Estonia would still host the 2002 contest. The Saku Suurhall was ultimately chosen as the venue for the contest. It is the largest indoor arena in Estonia, built in 2001 and holds up to 10,000 people. It is named after the Estonian brewery and soft drink company Saku.

== Participants ==
Eurovision Song Contest 2002 – Participation summaries by country
- Austria; Belgium; Bosnia and Herzegovina; Croatia; Cyprus; Denmark; Estonia; Finland; France; Germany; Greece; Israel; Latvia; Lithuania; Macedonia; Malta; Romania; Russia; Slovenia; Spain; Sweden; Switzerland; Turkey; United Kingdom

The European Broadcasting Union (EBU) had originally set the total number of participants to 22, but when it increased that number to 24, it granted Israel and Portugal, which had finished 16th and 17th in 2001, the opportunity to enter. Portuguese broadcaster Radiotelevisão Portuguesa (RTP) declined to enter the contest due to internal problems. This allowed eventual winner Latvia, who finished 18th in 2001, to enter. Despite finishing in joint 18th place with the Netherlands in 2001, tiebreaking rules put Latvia higher due to receiving more sets of 8 points.

Broadcasters from a total of 24 countries competed in the 2002 contest, which included the 16 top-placing countries from the previous year's contest and Latvia, alongside the seven returning countries, Austria, Belgium, Cyprus, Finland, Macedonia, Romania, and Switzerland, which had been relegated from competing in the 2001 contest. These seven countries replaced the bottom 5 countries from the 2001 contest – Iceland, Ireland, Netherlands, Norway, and Poland – all of which were relegated from taking part in this year's contest, as well as Portugal, who decided not to compete. The draw for the running order took place on 9 November 2001.

Several of the performing artists had previously competed in past editions. Constantinos Christoforou, a member of One, had represented Cyprus in 1996; while Philippos Constantinos, another member of the band, had provided backing vocals for Cyprus in 1995. Jody Pijper, a member of Sergio & the Ladies representing Belgium, had provided backing vocals for the Netherlands in 1982, in 1990, in 1994, and in 1996; while Ingrid Simons, another member of the band, had also provided backing vocals for the Netherlands in 1996. Sahlene representing Estonia, had provided backing vocals for Sweden in 1999 and Malta in 2000. Monica Anghel had represented Romania in 1996, but failed to progress from the qualifying round. In addition, Christina Argyri, who represented Cyprus in 2000 as part of Voice, and Kenny Lübcke, who represented Denmark in 1992 with Lotte Nilsson, provided backing vocals for the same country.

Eurovision Song Contest 2002 participants
Country	Broadcaster	Artist	Song	Language	Songwriter(s)
Austria	ORF	Manuel Ortega	"Say a Word"	English	Alexander Kahr; Robert Pflugler
Belgium	VRT	Sergio & the Ladies	"Sister"	English	Dirk Paelinck; Marc Paelinck
Bosnia and Herzegovina	PBSBiH	Maja	"Na jastuku za dvoje" (На јастуку за двоје)	Serbian, English	Ružica Čavić; Stevo Cvikić; Dragan Mijatović
Croatia	HRT	Vesna Pisarović	"Everything I Want"	English	Milana Vlaović
Cyprus	CyBC	One	"Gimme"	English	George Theofanous
Denmark	DR	Malene	"Tell Me Who You Are"	English	Michael Ronson
Estonia	ETV	Sahlene	"Runaway"	English	Jana Hallas; Alar Kotkas; Ilmar Laisaar; Pearu Paulus
Finland	YLE	Laura	"Addicted to You"	English	Janina Frostell; Maki Kolehmainen; Tracy Lipp
France	France Télévisions	Sandrine François	"Il faut du temps"	French	Rick Allison; Patrick Bruel; Marie-Florence Gros
Germany	NDR (Note: On behalf of the German public broadcasting consortium ARD)	Corinna May	"I Can't Live Without Music"	English	Bernd Meinunger; Ralph Siegel
Greece	ERT	Michalis Rakintzis	"S.A.G.A.P.O."	English	Michalis Rakintzis
Israel	IBA	Sarit Hadad	"Light a Candle"	Hebrew, English	Yoav Ginai; Svika Pick
Latvia	LTV	Marie N	"I Wanna"	English	Marija Naumova; Marats Samauskis
Lithuania	LRT	Aivaras	"Happy You"	English	Aivaras Stepukonis
Macedonia	MRT	Karolina	"Od nas zavisi" (Од нас зависи)	Macedonian	Vladimir Krstevski; Nikola Perevski
Malta	PBS	Ira Losco	"7th Wonder"	English	Gerard James Borg; Philip Vella
Romania	TVR	Monica Anghel and Marcel Pavel	"Tell Me Why"	English	Mirela Fugaru; Ionel Tudor
Russia	ORT	Prime Minister	"Northern Girl"	English	Irina Antonyan; Kim Breitburg; Evgeniy Fridlyand; Karen Kavaleryan
Slovenia	RTVSLO	Sestre	"Samo ljubezen"	Slovene	Barbara Pešut; Robert Pešut
Spain	TVE	Rosa	"Europe's Living a Celebration"	Spanish	Toni Ten; Xasqui Ten
Sweden	SVT	Afro-dite	"Never Let It Go"	English	Marcos Ubeda
Switzerland	SRG SSR	Francine Jordi	"Dans le jardin de mon âme"	French	Francine Lehmann
Turkey	TRT	Buket Bengisu and Group Safir	"Leylaklar Soldu Kalbinde"	Turkish, English	Figen Çakmak; Fani Hodara; Sami Hodara
United Kingdom	BBC	Jessica Garlick	"Come Back"	English	Martyn Baylay

== Format ==
For the first time, a slogan (or theme) was implemented. This year's theme was called 'A Modern Fairytale', which was evident in the postcards shown between the songs, which showed classic fairytales ending in modern Estonian situations.

The postcards continued with the opening theme of "A Modern Fairytale" taking well known fairy tales and translating them into Estonian life through short films, with a moral at the end of each one of them.

== Contest overview ==
The contest was held on 25 May 2002 at 22:00 EEST (21:00 CEST) and was won by Latvia. The table below outlines the participating countries, the order in which they performed, the competing artists and songs, and the results of the voting.

Latvia won with 176 points. Malta came second with 164 points, with Estonia, United Kingdom, France, Cyprus, Spain, Sweden, Romania and Russia completing the top ten. Finland, Germany, Switzerland, Lithuania and Denmark occupied the bottom five positions.

Winner

Results of the Eurovision Song Contest 2002
R/O	Country	Artist	Song	Points	Place
1	Cyprus	One	"Gimme"	85	6
2	United Kingdom	Jessica Garlick	"Come Back"	111	3
3	Austria	Manuel Ortega	"Say a Word"	26	18
4	Greece	Michalis Rakintzis	"S.A.G.A.P.O."	27	17
5	Spain	Rosa	"Europe's Living a Celebration"	81	7
6	Croatia	Vesna Pisarović	"Everything I Want"	44	11
7	Russia	Prime Minister	"Northern Girl"	55	10
8	Estonia	Sahlene	"Runaway"	111	3
9	Macedonia	Karolina	"Od nas zavisi"	25	19
10	Israel	Sarit Hadad	"Light a Candle"	37	12
11	Switzerland	Francine Jordi	"Dans le jardin de mon âme"	15	22
12	Sweden	Afro-dite	"Never Let It Go"	72	8
13	Finland	Laura	"Addicted to You"	24	20
14	Denmark	Malene	"Tell Me Who You Are"	7	24
15	Bosnia and Herzegovina	Maja	"Na jastuku za dvoje"	33	13
16	Belgium	Sergio and the Ladies	"Sister"	33	13
17	France	Sandrine François	"Il faut du temps"	104	5
18	Germany	Corinna May	"I Can't Live Without Music"	17	21
19	Turkey	Buket Bengisu and Group Safir	"Leylaklar Soldu Kalbinde"	29	16
20	Malta	Ira Losco	"7th Wonder"	164	2
21	Romania	Monica Anghel and Marcel Pavel	"Tell Me Why"	71	9
22	Slovenia	Sestre	"Samo ljubezen"	33	13
23	Latvia	Marie N	"I Wanna"	176	1
24	Lithuania	Aivaras	"Happy You"	12	23

=== Spokespersons ===
Each participating broadcaster appointed a spokesperson who was responsible for announcing, in English or French, the votes for its respective country.

1. Cyprus – Melani Steliou
2. United Kingdom – Colin Berry
3. Austria – Dodo Roscic
4. Greece – Alexis Kostalas
5. Spain – Anne Igartiburu
6. Croatia – Duško Ćurlić
7. Russia – Arina Sharapova
8. Estonia – Ilomai Küttim "Elektra"
9. Macedonia – Biljana Debarlieva
10. Israel – Michal Zo'aretz
11. Switzerland – Diana Jörg
12. Sweden – Kristin Kaspersen
13. Finland – Marion Rung
14. Denmark – Signe Svendsen
15. Bosnia and Herzegovina – Segmedina Srna
16. Belgium – Geena Lisa Peeters
17. France – Marie Myriam
18. Germany – Axel Bulthaupt
19. Turkey – Meltem Ersan Yazgan
20. Malta – Yvette Portelli
21. Romania – Leonard Miron
22. Slovenia – Nuša Derenda
23. Latvia – Ēriks Niedra
24. Lithuania – Loreta Tarozaitė

== Detailed voting results ==
According to the EBU rules, every broadcaster was free to make a choice between the full televoting system and the mixed 50-50 system. In exceptional circumstances, where televoting was not possible at all, only a jury was used. In the EBU's rules for the 2002 contest, it was stated; In the televoting, households shall not be permitted to vote more than three times.

At this contest (and the following one) the broadcaster decided to reverse the song recaps - starting instead with the last performed song (24) and finishing with the first performed song (1). This was due to the apparent preference within public vote for songs in the later part of the running order in comparison to the songs nearer to the start.

Detailed voting results of the Eurovision Song Contest 2002
		Total score	Cyprus	United Kingdom	Austria	Greece	Spain	Croatia	Russia	Estonia	Macedonia	Israel	Switzerland	Sweden	Finland	Denmark	Bosnia and Herzegovina	Belgium	France	Germany	Turkey	Malta	Romania	Slovenia	Latvia	Lithuania
Contestants	Cyprus	85		3		12	6	10	6	4				1	4			3				12	8	4	8	4
Contestants	United Kingdom	111			12	7				6	4	5	6	2	8	6	7	6	1	8	2	10		8	5	8
Contestants	Austria	26	1						1				7					5			12					
Contestants	Greece	27	12					1	8														6			
Contestants	Spain	81	7	2		4		6				6	12	7			6	12	12	7						
Contestants	Croatia	44	6		6	5					5		5				2			3				12		
Contestants	Russia	55	5			2				10		1			3							8	10		10	6
Contestants	Estonia	111		7	3			5	3		6	2		12	10	8	10	4		4	8	2	2	6	12	7
Contestants	Macedonia	25	3					4							1							5	12			
Contestants	Israel	37		5									1		5	1		2	10	5			5		3	
Contestants	Switzerland	15			5														3	2			3	1	1	
Contestants	Sweden	72		1	4	1				8		3			7	10	12	1			4			7	4	10
Contestants	Finland	24	2							5	1			10		3	3									
Contestants	Denmark	7										4									1	1				1
Contestants	Bosnia and Herzegovina	33			7		3	7			3			6		2						3		2		
Contestants	Belgium	33		4			1		7					3		4			2		10					2
Contestants	France	104		10		3	8			3		7	10	8	12	5	8	10		6			4	3	2	5
Contestants	Germany	17			1		2		2	1			3								3	4	1			
Contestants	Turkey	29					4	3			8								7				7			
Contestants	Malta	164	10	12	8	6	10	12	5	7	10	10	4	4	2	12	4	7	6	10	5			10	7	3
Contestants	Romania	71	8			8	5		12		12	8							4	1	7	6				
Contestants	Slovenia	33		6	2		7	8			2		2				1		5							
Contestants	Latvia	176	4	8	10	10	12	2	10	12	7	12	8	5	6	7	5	8	8	12	6	7		5		12
Contestants	Lithuania	12							4	2															6	

=== 12 points ===
Below is a summary of all 12 points in the final:

N.	Contestant	Nation(s) giving 12 points
5	Latvia	Estonia, Germany, Israel, Lithuania, Spain
3	Malta	Croatia, Denmark, United Kingdom
3	Spain	Belgium, France, Switzerland
2	Cyprus	Greece, Malta
2	Estonia	Latvia, Sweden
2	Romania	Macedonia, Russia
1	Austria	Turkey
1	Croatia	Slovenia
1	France	Finland
1	Macedonia	Romania
1	Greece	Cyprus
1	Sweden	Bosnia and Herzegovina
1	United Kingdom	Austria

=== Allegation of vote swapping ===
This year saw allegations that the juries in certain countries were guilty of swapping votes among each other. According to the Norwegian newspaper Dagbladet, The French Head of Delegation allegedly said that members of the Cypriot delegation had approached him to swap votes. In addition to Cyprus, allegations were also made toward Greece, Russia, Macedonia, Malta and Romania.

== Broadcasts ==
Each participating broadcaster was required to relay live and in full the contest via television. Non-participating EBU member broadcasters were also able to relay the contest as "passive participants"; any passive countries wishing to participate in the following year's event were also required to provide a live broadcast of the contest or a deferred broadcast within 24 hours. Broadcasters were able to send commentators to provide coverage of the contest in their own native language and to relay information about the artists and songs to their viewers. Known details on the broadcasts in each country, including the specific broadcasting stations and commentators, are shown in the tables below.

Broadcasters and commentators in participating countries
Country	Broadcaster	Channel(s)	Commentator(s)	Ref(s)
Austria	ORF	ORF 1	Andi Knoll	
Austria	ORF	FM4	Stermann & Grissemann	
Belgium	VRT	TV1	André Vermeulen and Bart Peeters	
Belgium	VRT	Radio 2	Filip Pletinckx and Katrien Palmers	
Belgium	VRT	Radio Donna	Jan Bosman	
Belgium	RTBF	La Une	Jean-Pierre Hautier	
Bosnia and Herzegovina	RTVFBiH	FTV1		
Croatia	HRT	HRT 1	Ante Batinović	
Cyprus	CyBC	RIK Ena	Evi Papamichail	
Denmark	DR	DR1	Keld Heick	
Estonia	ETV		Marko Reikop	
Finland	YLE	YLE TV2	Maria Guzenina and Asko Murtomäki	
Finland	YLE	YLE FST	Thomas Lundin	
Finland	YLE	YLE Radio Suomi	Iris Mattila and Tarja Närhi	
Finland	YLE	YLE Radio Vega		
France	France Télévisions	France 3	Marc-Olivier Fogiel and Dave	
Germany	ARD	Das Erste	Peter Urban	
Latvia	LTV		Kārlis Streips	
Lithuania	LRT	LRT	Darius Užkuraitis	
Malta	PBS	TVM	John Bundy	
Romania	TVR	România 1		
Russia	ORT (Note: Also broadcast deferred via the Orbita satellite broadcasting system in the Russian Far East)		Yuriy Aksyuta	
Slovenia	RTVSLO	SLO 1		
Spain	TVE	La Primera (Note: Additional live broadcast on TVE Internacional)	José Luis Uribarri	
Spain	RNE	Radio 1	Nieves Herrero and José María de Juana	
Sweden	SVT	SVT1	Claes Åkeson and Christer Björkman	
Sweden	SR	SR P4	Carolina Norén and Björn Kjellman	
Switzerland	SRG SSR	SF 2	Sandra Studer	
Switzerland	SRG SSR	TSR 1	Phil Mundwiller	
Switzerland	SRG SSR	TSI 1	Jonathan Tedesco	
Turkey	TRT	TRT 1	Ömer Önder	
United Kingdom	BBC	BBC One (Note: Additional live broadcast on BBC Prime)	Terry Wogan	
United Kingdom	BBC	BBC Choice	Jenny Eclair and Max Flint	
United Kingdom	BBC	BBC Radio 2	Ken Bruce	

Broadcasters and commentators in non-participating countries
Country	Broadcaster	Channel(s)	Commentator(s)	Ref(s)
Australia	SBS	SBS TV (Note: Deferred broadcast on 26 May at 20:30 (AEST))	Terry Wogan	
Belarus	BTRC			
Canada	TV5	TV5 Québec Canada (Note: Deferred broadcast at 22:05 (EDT))		
Falkland Islands	BFBS	BFBS 1, (Note: Deferred broadcast at 21:00 (FKT)) BFBS Radio 2		
Faroe Islands	SvF			
Iceland	RÚV	Sjónvarpið, Rás 2	Logi Bergmann Eiðsson	
Ireland	RTÉ	RTÉ One	Marty Whelan	
Netherlands	NOS	Nederland 2	Willem van Beusekom	
Netherlands	Radio 2			
Norway	NRK	NRK1	Jostein Pedersen	
Poland	TVP	TVP1	Artur Orzech	
Portugal	RTP	RTP1	Eládio Clímaco	
Ukraine	NTU	Pershyi Natsionalnyi (Note: Deferred broadcast on 26 May at 17:55 (EEST))		
Yugoslavia	RTS	RTS 2		

== Marcel Bezençon Awards ==
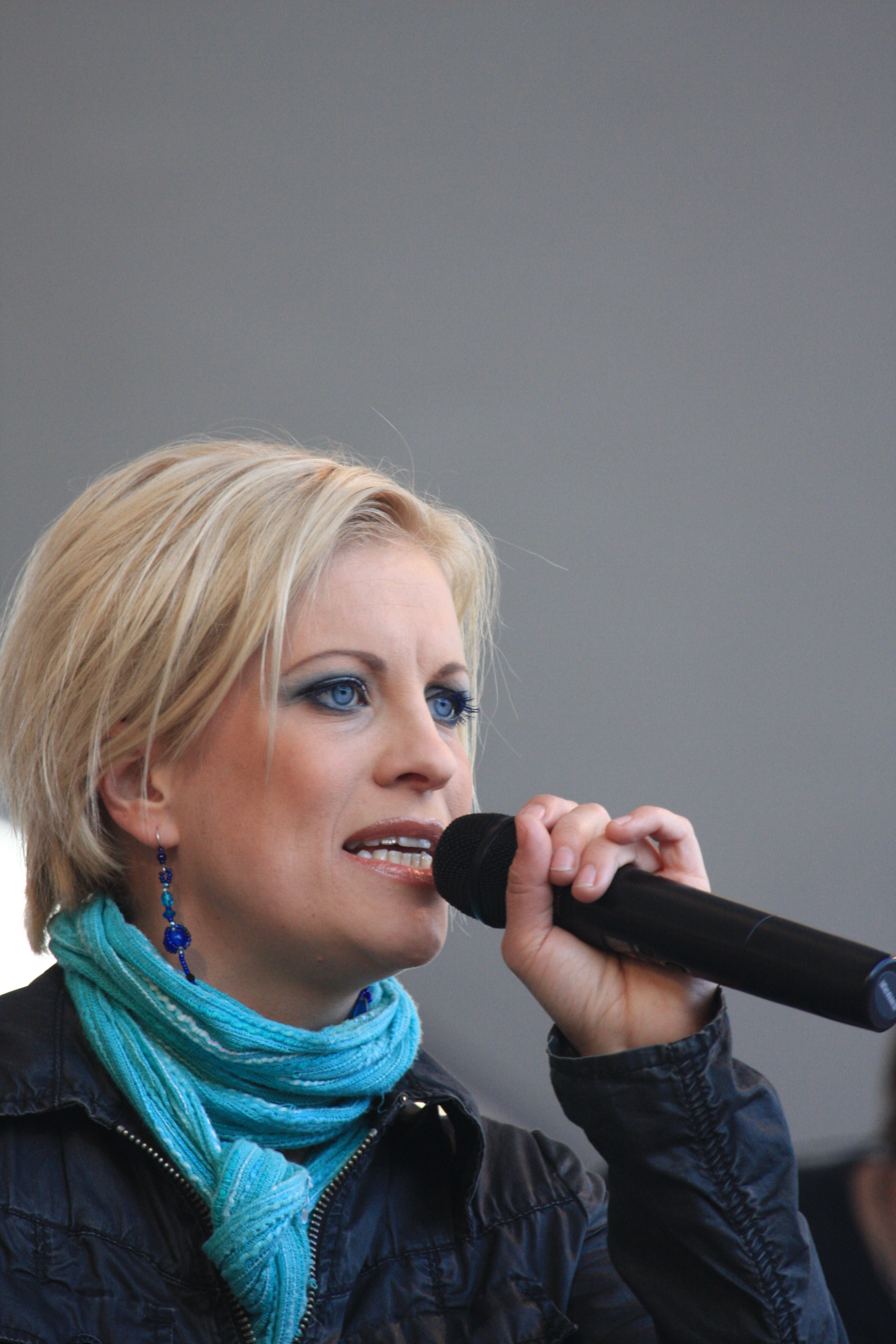
Laura Voutilainen, Finland's representative and winner of the inaugural Marcel Bezençon Awards' Fan Award

The Marcel Bezençon Awards, a series of awards held concurrently to the main contest, honour and celebrate the participants of the final of that year's Eurovision Song Contest. Named after one of the people influential in the creation of the contest, and created by two former Swedish Eurovision participants, Christer Björkman and Eurovision winner Richard Herrey, the inaugural awards were presented as part of this year's event. Three awards were presented in 2002, with the winner of each award determined by the collective votes of a different group of individuals:

- The Press Award for the best competing song, as determined by the accredited press and media, was awarded to the French entry, "Il faut du temps" performed by Sandrine François
- The Artistic Award for the best artistic performance, as determined by previous Eurovision winners, was awarded to the Swedish entry, "Never Let It Go" performed by Afro-dite
- The Fan Award, as determined by members of the international Eurovision fan club OGAE, was awarded to the Finnish entry, "Addicted to You" performed by Laura Voutilainen

The winners each received a hand-blown glass trophy designed by Karin Hammar and created at the Stockholm Glass Studio, which were handed out backstage prior to the contest proper.

== Official album ==
Cover art of the official album

Eurovision Song Contest: Tallinn 2002 (also known as Eurovision Song Contest: Estonia 2002) was the official compilation album of the 2002 contest, put together by the European Broadcasting Union and released by Ariola Records on 18 May 2002. The album featured all 24 songs that entered in the 2002 contest.

=== Charts ===
Chart (2002)	Peak position
German Compilation Albums (Offizielle Top 100)	6
