= Denmark in the Eurovision Song Contest 2002 =

- Eurovision Song Contest 2002
- Participating broadcaster: Danmarks Radio (DR)
- Country: Denmark
- Selection process: Dansk Melodi Grand Prix 2002
- Selection date: 9 February 2002

Competing entry
- Song: "Tell Me Who You Are"
- Artist: Malene
- Songwriter: Michael Ronson

Placement
- Final result: 24th, 7 points

Participation chronology

Denmark was represented at the Eurovision Song Contest 2002 with the song "Tell Me Who You Are", written by Michael Ronson, and performed by Malene. The Danish participating broadcaster, DR, organised the national final Dansk Melodi Grand Prix 2002 in order to select its entry for the contest. Ten songs competed in a televised show where "Vis mig hvem du er" performed by Malene was the winner as decided upon through two rounds of jury voting and public voting. The song was later translated from Danish to English for Eurovision and was titled "Tell Me Who You Are".

Denmark competed in the Eurovision Song Contest which took place on 25 May 2002. Performing during the show in position 14, Denmark placed twenty-fourth (last) out of the 24 participating countries, scoring 7 points.

== Background ==
Prior to the 2002 contest, DR had participated in the Eurovision Song Contest representing Denmark thirty-one times since its first entry in 1957. It had won the contest, to this point, on two occasions: in 1963 with the song "Dansevise" performed by Grethe and Jørgen Ingmann, and in 2000 with the song "Fly on the Wings of Love" performed by Olsen Brothers. In 2001, "Never Ever Let You Go" performed by Rollo & King placed second.

As part of its duties as participating broadcaster, DR organises the selection of its entry in the Eurovision Song Contest and broadcasts the event in the country. The broadcaster organised the Dansk Melodi Grand Prix 2002 national final in order to select its entry for the 2002 contest; having selected all of its Eurovision entries through the Dansk Melodi Grand Prix.

== Before Eurovision ==
=== Dansk Melodi Grand Prix 2002 ===
Dansk Melodi Grand Prix 2002 was the 33rd edition of Dansk Melodi Grand Prix, the music competition organised by DR to select its entries for the Eurovision Song Contest. The event was held on 9 February 2002 at the Cirkusbygningen in Copenhagen, hosted by Michael Carøe and Signe Svendsen and televised on DR1. The national final was watched by 2.082 million viewers in Denmark, making it the most popular show of the week in the country and the most watched edition of Dansk Melodi Grand Prix.

==== Format ====
Ten songs competed in one show where the winner was determined over two rounds of voting. In the first round, the top five songs based on the combination of votes from a public vote and a seven-member jury panel qualified to the superfinal. In the superfinal, the winner was determined again by the votes of the jury and public. Viewers were able to vote via telephone or SMS.

The seven-member jury panel was composed of:

- Keld Heick – singer-songwriter
- Gry Meilstrup – singer-songwriter, who represented Denmark in 1983
- Kaare Norge – guitarist and composer
- Sascha Dupont – singer-songwriter
- Carsten Michael Laursen – writer and Eurovision expert
- Sanne Gottlieb – journalist and singer
- Jesper Degn – radio host on DR P3

==== Competing entries ====
DR opened a submission period between 2 October 2001 and 5 November 2001 for composers to submit their entries. All composers and lyricists were required to be Danish citizens or have Danish residency, while all songs were required to be performed in Danish. The broadcaster received 662 entries during the submission period. A seven-member selection committee selected ten songs from the entries submitted to the broadcaster, while the artists of the selected entries were chosen by DR in consultation with their composers. The competing songs were announced on 13 December 2001 with their artists being announced on 9 January 2002. Among the artists was Helge Engelbrecht (member of Neighbours) who represented Denmark in 1987 as part of Bandjo.

Artist	Song	Songwriter(s)
Bjarne Langhoff	"Det' på tide"	Michael Kolster, Carsten Kolster
Jeanett Debb	"Medie show"	Jeanett Debb, Michael Holmberg, Dominic Gale
Luna Park	"Sommerregn"	Jonas Bengtson, Lasse Drevsholt
Mads Broe	"Aldrig min igen"	Nanna Kalinka Bjerke
Malene Winther Mortensen	"Vis mig hvem du er"	Michael Ronson
Morten Fleck	"Alle dage er en fredag"	Morten Fleck
Neighbours	"Alt mellem himmel og jord"	Helge Engelbrecht, Tommy Rasmussen
Pætur við Keldu	"Som en drøm"	Pætur við Keldu
Tine B.	"Helt derinde"	Tine Bjerggaard, Sune Kempf
U.F.O.	"Mon du falder ned"	Rune Braager, Kim Sandberg

==== Final ====
The final took place on 9 February 2002. In the first round of voting the top five advanced to the superfinal based on the votes of a seven-member jury and a public vote. In the superfinal, the winner, "Vis mig hvem du er" performed by Malene Winther Mortensen, was selected by the public and jury vote. The telephone voting results of each of Denmark's four regions as well as the SMS and jury voting results in the superfinal were converted to points which were each distributed as follows: 4, 6, 8, 10 and 12 points. A total of 160,000 votes were received from the public during the show: 100,000 in the final and 60,000 in the superfinal.

In addition to the performances of the competing entries, Cliff Richard (who represented the United Kingdom in 1968 and in 1973), Carmen Flamenco Dancers, Gabrielle and James Sampson performed as the interval acts.

Final – 9 February 2002
R/O	Artist	Song	Result
1	Luna Park	"Sommerregn"	Advanced
2	U.F.O.	"Mon du falder ned"	—N/a
3	Jeanett Debb	"Medie show"	—N/a
4	Morten Fleck	"Alle dage er en fredag"	Advanced
5	Neighbours	"Alt mellem himmel og jord"	Advanced
6	Bjarne Langhoff	"Det' på tide"	—N/a
7	Tine B.	"Helt derinde"	—N/a
8	Mads Broe	"Aldrig min igen"	—N/a
9	Pætur við Keldu	"Som en drøm"	Advanced
10	Malene Winther Mortensen	"Vis mig hvem du er"	Advanced

Superfinal – 9 February 2002
R/O	Artist	Song	Jury	Public	Total	Place
1	Luna Park	"Sommerregn"	10	42	52	3
2	Morten Fleck	"Alle dage er en fredag"	12	30	42	4
3	Neighbours	"Alt mellem himmel og jord"	6	46	52	2
4	Pætur við Keldu	"Som en drøm"	8	22	30	5
5	Malene Winther Mortensen	"Vis mig hvem du er"	4	60	64	1

Detailed Regional Televoting Results
Song	Jutland	Funen	Zealand and Islands	Capital Region	SMS	Total
"Sommerregn"	8	8	8	8	10	42
"Alle dage er en fredag"	6	6	6	4	8	30
"Alt mellem himmel og jord"	10	10	10	10	6	46
"Som en drøm"	4	4	4	6	4	22
"Vis mig hvem du er"	12	12	12	12	12	60

=== Controversy ===
The winning song of Dansk Melodi Grand Prix 2002, "Vis mig hvem du er", was ranked last by the jury in the second round despite receiving top points from all five public voting groups. Jurors Keld Heick, Sascha Dupont and Sanne Gottlieb publicly criticised the song for its poor lyrics, with the latter two stating that "the Danes are too easy to fool". Gottlieb also accused the media and DR of favouring Mortensen before the competition due to her being already well-known. Subsequently, Mortensen cancelled her scheduled appearance in the programme Hit med sangen which Dupont also participated in.

=== Promotion ===
Malene Mortensen specifically promoted "Vis mig hvem du er" as the Danish Eurovision entry between 15 and 16 February 2002 by performing the song during the Maltese Eurovision national final.

== At Eurovision ==
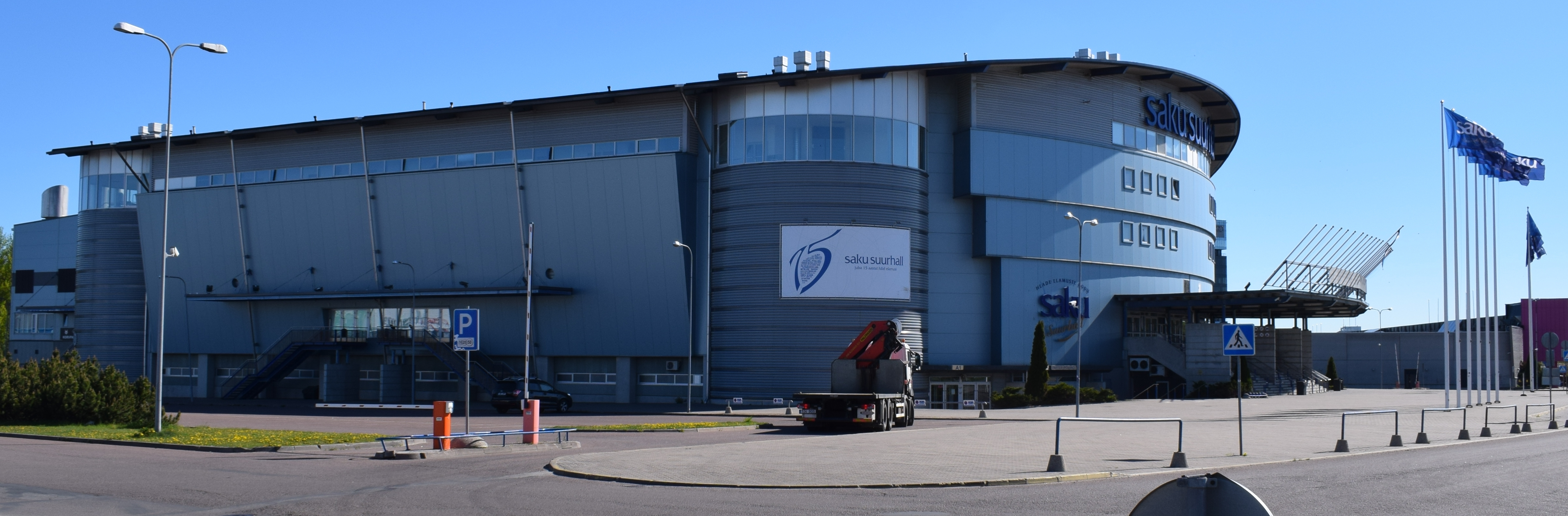
The Eurovision Song Contest 2002 took place at Saku Suurhall in Tallinn, Estonia.

The Eurovision Song Contest 2002 took place at Saku Suurhall in Tallinn, Estonia, on 25 May 2002. The participants list included the previous year's winning country, the "Big Four" countries, consisting of France, Germany, Spain. and the United Kingdom, any eligible countries which did not compete in the 2001 contest, and countries which had obtained the highest average points total at the previous year's contest, up to 24 total participants. According to Eurovision rules, all nations with the exceptions of the bottom six countries in the 2001 contest competed in the final. On 9 November 2001, an allocation draw was held which determined the running order and Denmark was set to perform in position 14, following the entry from the Finland and before the entry from Bosnia and Herzegovina. At the contest, Malene Mortensen performed the English version of "Vis mig hvem du er", titled "Tell Me Who You Are". Denmark finished in twenty-fourth (last) place with 7 points. This was the first time Denmark finished in last place at the Eurovision Song Contest.

The show was broadcast on DR1 with commentary by Keld Heick. The contest was watched by a total of 2 million viewers in Denmark.

=== Voting ===
Below is a breakdown of points awarded to Denmark and awarded by Denmark in the contest. The nation awarded its 12 points in the contest to Malta. DR appointed Signe Svendsen as its spokesperson to announce the Danish votes during the show.

Points awarded to Denmark
Score	Country
12 points	
10 points	
8 points	
7 points	
6 points	
5 points	
4 points	Israel
3 points	
2 points	
1 point	Lithuania; Malta; Turkey

Points awarded by Denmark
Score	Country
12 points	Malta
10 points	Sweden
8 points	Estonia
7 points	Latvia
6 points	United Kingdom
5 points	France
4 points	Belgium
3 points	Finland
2 points	Bosnia and Herzegovina
1 point	Israel
