= Finland in the Eurovision Song Contest 2004 =

- Eurovision Song Contest 2004
- Participating broadcaster: Yleisradio (Yle)
- Country: Finland
- Selection process: Euroviisut 2004
- Selection date: 24 January 2004

Competing entry
- Song: "Takes 2 to Tango"
- Artist: Jari Sillanpää
- Songwriters: Mika Toivanen; Jari Sillanpää

Placement
- Semi-final result: Failed to qualify (14th)

Participation chronology

Finland was represented at the Eurovision Song Contest 2004 with the song "Takes 2 to Tango", composed by Mika Toivanen, with lyrics by Jari Sillanpää, and performed by Sillanpää himself. The Finnish participating broadcaster, Yleisradio (Yle), organised the national final Euroviisut 2004 to select its entry for the contest. The broadcaster returned to the contest after a one-year absence following their relegation from 2003 as one of the bottom five countries in 2002. 20 entries were selected to compete in the national final, which consisted of two semi-finals and a final, taking place in January 2004. Ten entries competed in each semi-final and the top six from each semi-final, as selected solely by a public vote, advanced to the final. Twelve entries competed in the final on 24 January where votes from six regional juries first selected the top six to advance to a second round. In the second round, votes from the public selected "Takes 2 to Tango" performed by Jari Sillanpää as the winner with 98,987 votes.

Finland competed in the semi-final of the Eurovision Song Contest which took place on 12 May 2004. Performing as the opening entry for the show in position 1, "Takes 2 to Tango" was not announced among the top 10 entries of the semi-final and therefore did not qualify to compete in the final. It was later revealed that Finland placed fourteenth out of the 22 participating countries in the semi-final with 51 points.

== Background ==
Prior to the 2004 contest, Yleisradio (Yle) had participated in the Eurovision Song Contest representing Finland thirty-seven times since its first entry in 1961. Its best result in the contest achieved in 1973 where the song "Tom Tom Tom" performed by Marion Rung placed sixth.

As part of its duties as participating broadcaster, Yle organises the selection of its entry in the Eurovision Song Contest and broadcasts the event in the country. The broadcaster confirmed its intentions to participate at the 2004 contest on 28 April 2003. Yle has been selected its entries through national final competitions that have varied in format over the years. Since 1961, a selection show that was often titled Euroviisukarsinta highlighted that the purpose of the program was to select a song for Eurovision. Along with its participation confirmation, Yle announced that its entry for the 2004 contest would be selected through the Euroviisut selection show.

== Before Eurovision ==
=== Euroviisut 2004 ===
Euroviisut 2004 was the national final organised by Yle to select its entry for the Eurovision Song Contest 2004. The competition consisted of three shows that commenced with the first of two semi-finals on 16 January 2004 and concluded with a final on 24 January 2004. All shows were broadcast on Yle TV2 and Yle FST.

==== Format ====
The format of the competition consisted of three shows: two semi-finals and a final. Ten songs competed in each semi-final and the top six entries from each semi-final qualified to complete the twelve-song lineup in the final. The results for the semi-finals were determined exclusively by a public vote, while the results in the final were determined by public voting and jury voting. Public voting included the options of telephone and SMS.

==== Competing entries ====
A submission period was opened by Yle which lasted between 30 July 2003 and 17 October 2003. All singer(s) had to hold Finnish citizenship or live in Finland permanently in order for the entry to qualify to compete. A panel of ten experts appointed by Yle selected twenty entries for the competition from the 351 received submissions. The experts were Kjell Ekholm (Director of Entertainment at Yle FST), Nina Andrén (blogger and Eurovision expert), Maria Guzenina (presenter and journalist at Radio Aino), Jorma Hietamäki (music director of Yle Radio Suomi), Heikki Hilamaa (Head of Music at YLEXQ), Jani Juntunen (radio presenter), Thomas Lundin (editor at Yle FST), Iris Mattila (music journalist at Yle Radio Suomi), Asko Murtomäki (Eurovision expert) and Tarja Närhi (music journalist at Yle Radio Suomi). The competing entries were presented on 19 November 2003.

Artist	Song	Songwriter(s)
Anna Stenlund	"A Little Crazy"	Janne Hyöty, Sofie Björkgren-Näse
Arja Koriseva	"'Til the End of Time"	Thomas G:son, Henrik Sethsson, Veijo Laine, Petri Pyykkönen
Danny and D'Voices	"Seven Times Seven"	Jukka Karppinen, Ora Turunen, Pertti Jalonen
Geir Rönning	"I Don't Need to Say"	Jimmy Westerlund, Fredrik Furu, Geir Rönning
Heidi Kyrö and Just	"Dance My Heart Away"	Toni Nygård
Iina and Gary	"You Don't Need to Go"	Christian Antblad, Tommy Denander, Mika Toivanen
Jan Mikael	"One Year of Love"	SpaceChild
Jari Sillanpää	"Takes 2 to Tango"	Mika Toivanen, Jari Sillanpää
Johanna Försti	"Rain on Water"	Nalle Ahlstedt, M.O. Charles
Jonna K.	"Like Believers Do"	Jade Ell, Mats Tärnfors, Janne Hyöty
Karoliina Kallio	"What If"	Henrik Sethsson, Magnus Funemyr
Kirsi Ranto	"I Can't Stop Lovin' You"	Thomas G:son
Komissio	"Mouse in the Misery"	Mika Koski, Tuuli Kuittinen
Mira	"Reason"	J-P. Järvinen
Mirella	"My Everlasting"	Janne Hyöty, Mirella Pendolin
Patrick Linman	"Can't Stop Loving You"	Patrick Linman, Mats Persson
Riikka	"Toarie"	Ville Laaksonen, Riikka Timonen
Sheidi	"Higher Ground"	Nalle Ahlstedt
Sonja Biskop	"Should I Run, Should I Hide"	Peter Svanström, Tage Borgmästars
Susann Sonntag	"Eleventh Hour"	Tommy Lydell, Lotta Ahlin

==== Semi-finals ====
The two semi-final shows took place on 16 and 17 January 2004 at the Tohloppi Studios in Tampere, hosted by Finnish journalists/presenters Maria Guzenina and Bettina Sågbom. The top six from the ten competing entries in each semi-final qualified to the final based on the results from the public vote. A total of 70,270 votes were cast over the two shows: 43,210 in the first semi-final and 27,060 in the second semi-final.

Semi-final 1 – 16 January 2004
R/O	Artist	Song	Televote	Place
1	Heidi Kyrö and Just	"Dance My Heart Away"	2,525	6
2	Kirsi Ranto	"I Can't Stop Lovin' You"	723	10
3	Karoliina Kallio	"What If"	1,842	7
4	Komissio	"Mouse in the Misery"	865	8
5	Anna Stenlund	"A Little Crazy"	7,320	2
6	Iina and Gary	"You Don't Need to Go"	3,045	5
7	Geir Rönning	"I Don't Need to Say"	3,458	4
8	Sheidi	"Higher Ground"	757	9
9	Jari Sillanpää	"Takes 2 to Tango"	16,859	1
10	Riikka	"Toarie"	5,816	3

Semi-final 2 – 17 January 2004
R/O	Artist	Song	Televote	Place
1	Patrick Linman	"Can't Stop Loving You"	2,915	4
2	Arja Koriseva	"'Til the End of Time"	2,458	6
3	Sonja Biskop	"Should I Run, Should I Hide"	3,934	3
4	Johanna Försti	"Rain on Water"	1,204	9
5	Jonna K.	"Like Believers Do"	4,856	2
6	Jan Mikael	"One Year of Love"	1,411	8
7	Susann Sonntag	"Eleventh Hour"	5,213	1
8	Mira	"Reason"	640	10
9	Danny and D'Voices	"Seven Times Seven"	2,674	5
10	Mirella	"My Everlasting"	1,755	7

==== Final ====
The final took place on 24 January 2004 at the Tampere Hall in Tampere, hosted by Finnish journalists/presenters Maria Guzenina, Bettina Sågbom and Antero Mertaranta. The twelve entries that qualified from the preceding two semi-finals competed and the winner was selected over two rounds of voting. In the first round, the top six from the twelve competing entries qualified to the second round based on the votes of six regional juries. Each jury group distributed their points as follows: 1, 2, 4, 6, 8 and 10 points. In the second round, "Takes 2 to Tango" performed by Jari Sillanpää was selected as the winner based on the results from the public vote. 280,542 votes were cast in the superfinal. In addition to the performances of the competing entries, the interval act featured Hot Dance Club Company dancing a medley of Eurovision winning songs and Finland's entries, and Christine Guldbrandsen performing "Surfing in the Air".

First Round – 24 January 2004
R/O	Artist	Song	Regional Juries						Total	Place
R/O	Artist	Song	Oulu	Vaasa	Kuopio	Lappeenranta	Turku	Helsinki	Total	Place
1	Arja Koriseva	"'Til the End of Time"							0	10
2	Anna Stenlund	"A Little Crazy"	8	6	2	6	10	6	38	1
3	Patrick Linman	"Can't Stop Loving You"	2	1				2	5	8
4	Iina and Gary	"You Don't Need to Go"	1	8		8	6	1	24	4
5	Jonna K.	"Like Believers Do"	6	2	1	2	8	8	27	3
6	Geir Rönning	"I Don't Need to Say"	4	10	4	4	1		23	5
7	Susann Sonntag	"Eleventh Hour"							0	10
8	Riikka	"Toarie"	10		6	10		10	36	2
9	Jari Sillanpää	"Takes 2 to Tango"		4	10		4		18	6
10	Heidi Kyrö and Just	"Dance My Heart Away"				1			1	9
11	Sonja Biskop	"Should I Run, Should I Hide"			8		2	4	14	7
12	Danny and D'Voices	"Seven Times Seven"							0	10

Second Round – 24 January 2004
R/O	Artist	Song	Televote	Place
1	Anna Stenlund	"A Little Crazy"	66,548	2
2	Iina and Gary	"You Don't Need to Go"	15,210	6
3	Jonna K.	"Like Believers Do"	32,693	4
4	Geir Rönning	"I Don't Need to Say"	28,935	5
5	Riikka	"Toarie"	38,169	3
6	Jari Sillanpää	"Takes 2 to Tango"	98,987	1

Regional Jury Members
Jury	Members
Oulu	Marjo Kurttila; Jukka Väisänen; Esa Virkkula; Marko Sirvio; Jouni Tyni; Riitta Pullianen; Marika Lamberg; Jaana Seppänen; Anna Itkonen
Vaasa	Birgitta Vuorela; Arto Loukasmäki; Arto Luomala; Piia Kleemola; Tero Niemi; Heli Uusimäki; Marjut Rothovius; Ari Saari; Martti Tiainen; Marja Niemelä
Kuopio	Petri Julkunen; Seppo Kononen; Reetta Mölsä; Sanna Rosberg; Olavi Rytkönen; Ilkka Pettersson; Kirsti Savinof; Risto Löf; Vesa Toivanen
Lappeenranta	Petri Kivimäki; Sarri Taskula; Outi Vasama; Anu Partanen; Antti Hirvikallio; Henna Juuti; Ismo Varis; Antti Taipale; Hannu Sopanen; Juho Liira
Turku	Erkki Lehtola; Maria Puhakka; Mira Oksanen; Anna-Mari Laakso; Antti Kujanpää; Sami Rannila; Lotta Svartsjö; Esa Leinonen; Pekka Vaaherkumpu
Helsinki	Jari Mäkäräinen; Jukka Hakoköngäs; Kari M. Pössi; Teemu Suominen; Heta Hyttinen; Linda Lappalainen; Päivi Paldan; Tiina Tuomaala; Tommi Kantola

== At Eurovision ==
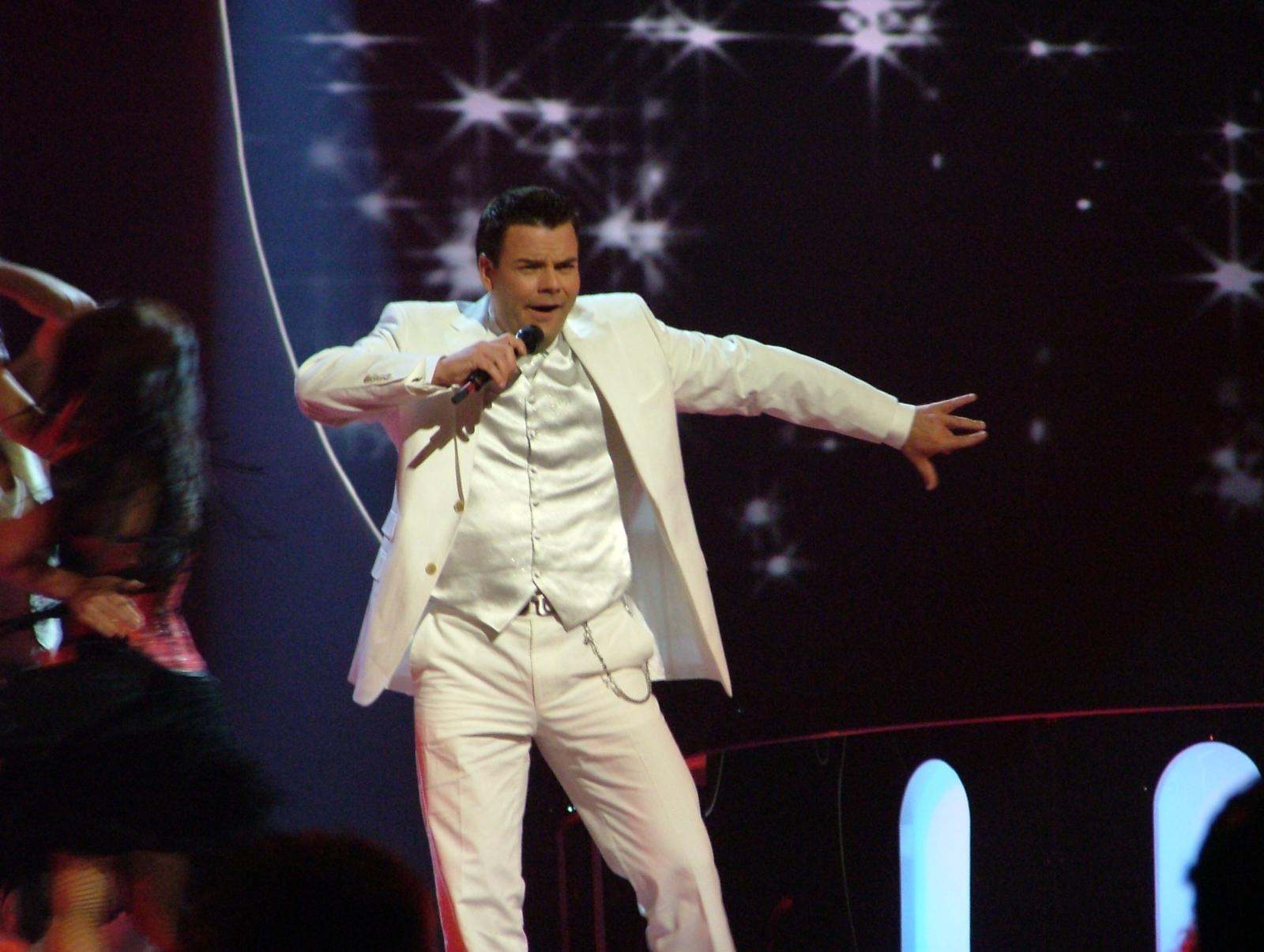
Jari Sillanpää during a rehearsal before the semi-final

It was announced that the competition's format would be expanded to include a semi-final in 2004. According to the rules, all nations with the exceptions of the host country, the "Big Four" (France, Germany, Spain and the United Kingdom), and the ten highest placed finishers in the 2003 contest are required to qualify from the semi-final on 12 May 2004 in order to compete for the final on 15 May 2004; the top ten countries from the semi-final progress to the final. On 23 March 2004, a special allocation draw was held which determined the running order for the semi-final and Finland was set to open the show and perform in position 1, before the entry from Belarus. Jari Sillanpää was accompanied by Hanna-Riikka Siitonen and Riikka Timonen as backing vocalists, Mika Toivanen as a keyboardist and a backing vocalist, and Antton Laine and Annina Rubinstein as dancers. At the end of the semi-final, Finland was not announced among the top 10 entries in the semi-final and therefore failed to qualify to compete in the final. It was later revealed that Finland placed fourteenth in the semi-final, receiving a total of 51 points.

The semi-final and the final were televised in Finland on Yle TV2 with commentary in Finnish by Markus Kajo and Asko Murtomäki. The three shows were also broadcast on YLE FST with commentary in Swedish by Thomas Lundin as well as via radio with Finnish commentary by Sanna Pirkkalainen and Jorma Hietamäki on Yle Radio Suomi. Yle appointed Anna Stenlund as its spokesperson to announce the Finnish votes during the final.

=== Voting ===
Below is a breakdown of points awarded to Finland and awarded by Finland in the semi-final and grand final of the contest. The nation awarded its 12 points to Estonia in the semi-final and to Sweden in the final of the contest.

Following the release of the televoting figures by the EBU after the conclusion of the competition, it was revealed that a total of 61,527 televotes were cast in Finland during the two shows: 15,575 votes during the semi-final and 45,952 votes during the final.

==== Points awarded to Finland ====
Points awarded to Finland (Semi-final)
Score	Country
12 points	
10 points	
8 points	Sweden
7 points	Albania; Estonia
6 points	Cyprus; Monaco
5 points	Greece
4 points	
3 points	Iceland; Norway; Spain
2 points	Macedonia
1 point	Belgium

==== Points awarded by Finland ====
Points awarded by Finland (Semi-final)
Score	Country
12 points	Estonia
10 points	Serbia and Montenegro
8 points	Ukraine
7 points	Cyprus
6 points	Albania
5 points	Greece
4 points	Denmark
3 points	Netherlands
2 points	Israel
1 point	Croatia

Points awarded by Finland (Final)
Score	Country
12 points	Sweden
10 points	Serbia and Montenegro
8 points	Ukraine
7 points	Cyprus
6 points	Greece
5 points	Turkey
4 points	Russia
3 points	Albania
2 points	Iceland
1 point	Croatia
