= Janina Fry =

Finnish pop singer and model

Janina Päivänsäde Fry (née Frostell) (born 12 November 1973 in Helsinki) is a Finnish actress, singer, model, fashion designer and beauty pageant titleholder. She hosted the show Bella on Finnish television channel Nelonen.

== Early life and education ==
She grew up in Porvoo. She has a vocational qualification in Business Administration and Cosmetology. She completed Fashion Design studies at Helsinki Design School in June 2016.

== Career ==
Fry released a style book Upeana Juhlaan with Suvi Tiilikainen and Katariina Kivimäki in August 2015. In October 2019, she began writing a blog for women's magazine Anna's website.

In 2019, she was a candidate representing Swedish People's Party of Finland in the parliamentary elections, but was not elected with 1475 votes.

=== Modeling ===
In 1993, her breakthrough came by winning the Maiden of Finland beauty pageant. In November 1993, she participated in the Miss World beauty pageant and was placed at number 6. The pageant was hosted by Pierce Brosnan and judges included Christie Brinkley, Grace Jones and Jackie Chan. In 2001, Fry was voted fifth on British men's magazine Arena's list of "World's Sexiest Women."

She has modeled Gossard lingerie and had a five-year contract with Panos Emporio swimwear. Fry has been featured in numerous fashion and lifestyle magazines such as Sweden's Café, and Finland's Me Naiset, Anna and Kotiliesi.

=== Fashion design ===
She launched her own lingerie line Janina Frostell Collection in 1999, which lasted for six years until 2005. In 2007, she launched a clothing collection Janina F by Janina Frostell for retail chain Tokmanni. In 2012, she created an exclusive clothing brand Janina F for K-Citymarket.

In 2016, an evening gown designed by Fry was worn by Tiina Laisi-Puheloinen at the Independence Day Reception, an annual event organised by the President of Finland at the Presidential Palace in Helsinki on 6 December, Finland's Independence Day.

=== Music ===
She has recorded two studio albums and released nine singles. Fry co-wrote "Addicted to You" with Tracy Lipp, which was the Finnish entry in the Eurovision Song Contest 2002, performed by Laura Voutilainen.

== Public image ==
On the first quarter of 2007, she was the tenth most searched celebrity in Finland on the search engine website www.fi.

== Personal life ==
In 2007, she married Mark Fry, the director of marketing at Sony BMG in Finland. Fry gave birth to her first child, a daughter, Sophia in March 2007. In 2010, she gave birth to their second child, a son, Brandon. The family lived in Espoo, Finland, before they moved to Stockholm, Sweden, in 2021.

== Discography ==
=== Albums ===
Year	Album	Chart peak FIN
1999	House of Joy	–
2003	Impossible Love	–

=== Singles ===
Year	Single	Chart peak FIN	Album
1998	"A Little Change (Gonna Do It)"	–	House of Joy
1999	"Love Is / No One But You"	–	House of Joy
1999	"What Goes Around"	–	House of Joy
2001	"Like a Hurricane"	–	Impossible Love
2002	"I'll Save My Tears"	19	Impossible Love
2003	"Impossible Love"	–	Impossible Love
2003	"Insanity (Why It Always Happens to Me)"	9	Impossible Love
2003	"Honey Love"	–	Impossible Love
2003	"Call Me"	–	Impossible Love

== Filmography ==
Film
Year	Title	Role	Notes
1998	Ihanat naiset rannalla	Viviann	Credited as Janina Frostell
2002	One-Way Ticket to Mombasa	Girl in Poster	Uncredited

Television
Year	Title	Role	Notes
1997	Tangomarkkinat	Herself	Host; 2 episodes
2000	Sincerely Yours in Cold Blood	Armi	Episode: "Tiedän paikan armahan"; Credited as Janina Frostell
2006	Bella	Herself	Host
2020	Tanssii tähtien kanssa	Herself	Contestant; 8 episodes
2022	Masked Singer Suomi	Diamond	3 episodes

== Bibliography ==
- Fry, Janina; Tiilikainen, Suvi; Kivimäki, Katariina: Upeana Juhlaan. Otava. August 2015.
