= Kokkonen =

Kokkonen is a Finnish surname. Notable people with the surname include:

- Akseli Kokkonen (born 1984), Norwegian ski jumper
- Ere Kokkonen (1938–2008), Finnish film director
- Joonas Kokkonen (1921–1996), Finnish composer
- Kiti Kokkonen (born 1974), Finnish actress and author
- Lauri Kokkonen (1918–1985), Finnish author and playwright
- Marketta Kokkonen (born 1946), Finnish city manager
- Mikko Kokkonen (born 2001), Finnish ice hockey player
- Pentti Kokkonen (born 1955), Finnish ski jumper
- Sonja Kokkonen (born 1996), Finnish rhythmic gymnast
- Taina Kokkonen (born 1975), Finnish singer
- Terhi Kokkonen (born 1974), Finnish musician
- Veli-Pekka Kokkonen (born 1966), Finnish high jumper
