= Jari Sillanpää =

Finnish-Swedish singer (born 1965)

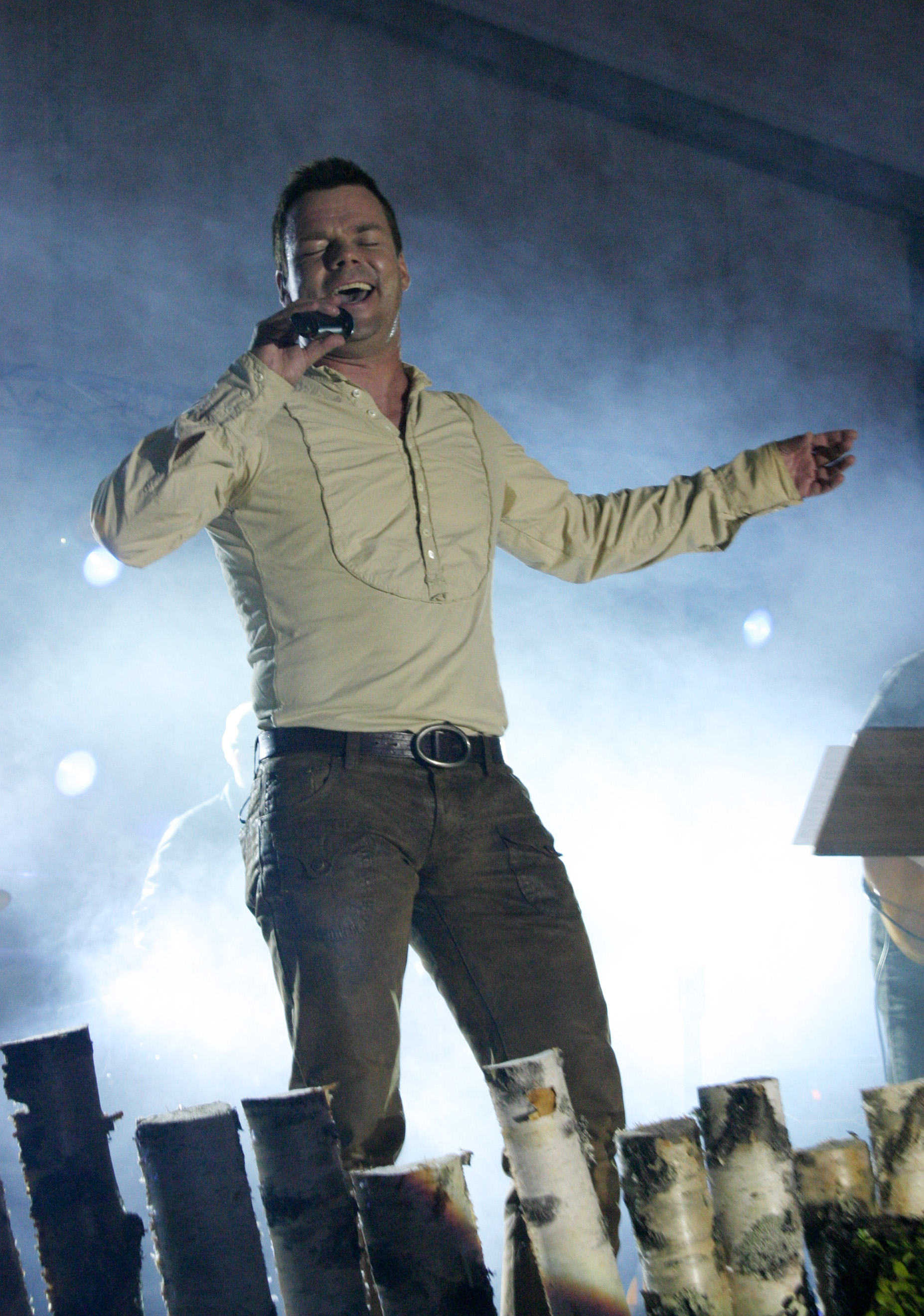

Background information
- Born: 16 August 1965 (age 60); Ludvika, Sweden
- Genres: Iskelmä (schlager)
- Instrument: Singing
- Years active: 1995–present
- Labels: MTV-Musiikki, Bridgehead, Suomen Mediamusiikki, Veijari-tuotanto
- Website: jarisillanpaa.com

Jari Veikko Sillanpää (Finnish pronunciation: [ˈjɑri ˈsilːɑmpæː]; born 16 August 1965) is a Finnish-Swedish singer. With over 820,000 records sold, he is the fifth-best-selling music artist and second-best-selling solo artist in Finland.

== Life and career ==
Born into a Sweden-Finnish family, Sillanpää spent his childhood in Sweden. His mother was one of the tens of thousands Finnish children who were evacuated to Sweden during World War II. Sillanpää's maternal great-grandfather, Potif Afanasief, and great-grandmother were Russians.

Sillanpää moved to Finland in the mid-1990s. He gained fame after winning the Seinäjoki Tangomarkkinat tango contest in 1995.

Sillanpää's 1996 debut album Jari Sillanpää is the best-selling album of all time in Finland, with over 270,000 copies sold.

In 1998, Sillanpää was awarded the Male Soloist of the Year Emma award.

Sillanpää represented Finland in the Eurovision Song Contest 2004 and his song "Takes 2 to Tango" (which he wrote the lyrics for) received 51 points in the semi-final, taking the 14th place and not qualifying for the final. Sillanpää attempted to represent Finland again in 2009, participating in the national selection with the song "Kirkas kipinä", making it to the final show, but finishing out of the final three.

He served as the Finnish spokesperson at Eurovision in 2005 and again in 2009.

== Personal life ==
A Swedish citizen by birth, Sillanpää also obtained Finnish citizenship in the early 2010s. In 2006 Sillanpää came out publicly as homosexual.

== Legal issues ==
In August 2018, Sillanpää received a suspended 10-month sentence for buying methamphetamine. In early 2020, Sillanpää was on trial for having filmed a computer screen with his phone while a child sexual abuse video was playing on the computer. Sillanpää denied the charge and said someone else had used his phone. He was convicted and given a fine of more than 15,000 euros.

== Discography ==
Albums

- Jari Sillanpää (1996)
- Hyvää joulua (1996) – Christmas album
- Auringonnousu (1997)
- Varastetut helmet (1998)
- Onnenetsijä (1999)
- Maa on niin kaunis (2000) – Christmas album
- Hän kertoo sen sävelin (2001)
- Määränpää tuntematon (2003)
- Albumi (2008)
- Al Ritmo Latino (2008)
- Kuin elokuvissa (2009)
- Millainen laulu jää (2011)
- Rakkaudella merkitty mies (2014)

Compilation albums

- Kuninkaan kyyneleet (2000)
- Parhaat (2005)
- Kaikkien aikojen parhaat (2013)

Singles

- "Bum bum bum" (1997)
- "Valkeaa unelmaa" (1998)
- "Lauluni" (1999)
- "Kuuleeko Eero?" (1999)
- "Lumilinna" (1999)
- "Sininen & punainen" (2001)
- "Takes 2 to Tango" (2004)
- "Vierellesi kaipaan" (with Katri Helena) (2007)
- "Liekeissä" (2012)

== See also ==
- List of best-selling music artists in Finland

Preceded by Laura with Addicted to You	Finland in the Eurovision Song Contest; 2004	Succeeded by Geir Rönning with Why?
