= Turkey in the Eurovision Song Contest 2002 =

- Eurovision Song Contest 2002
- Participating broadcaster: Turkish Radio and Television Corporation (TRT)
- Country: Turkey
- Selection process: 25. Eurovision Şarkı Yarışması Türkiye Finali
- Selection date: 15 February 2002

Competing entry
- Song: "Leylaklar Soldu Kalbinde"
- Artist: Buket Bengisu and Group Safir
- Songwriters: Fani Hodara; Sami Hodara; Figen Çakmak

Placement
- Final result: 16th, 29 points

Participation chronology

Turkey was represented at the Eurovision Song Contest 2002 with the song "Leylaklar Soldu Kalbinde", written by Samih Hodara, Figen Çakmak, and Fani Hodara, and performed by Buket Bengisu and Group Safir. The Turkish participating broadcaster, the Turkish Radio and Television Corporation (TRT), selected its entry through a national final.

Seven artists and song competed in a televised national final on 15 February 2002 where the winner, "Leylaklar Soldu Kalbinde" performed by Buket Bengisu and Group Safir was selected by a ten-member jury panel.

Turkey competed in the Eurovision Song Contest which took place on 25 May 2002. Performing during the show in position 19, Turkey placed sixteenth out of the 24 participating countries, scoring 29 points.

== Background ==
Prior to the 2002 contest, the Turkish Radio and Television Corporation (TRT) had participated in the Eurovision Song Contest representing Turkey 23 times since its first entry in 1975. It missed the 1979 contest because Arab countries pressured the Turkish government to withdraw from the contest because of the dispute over the Status of Jerusalem, and 1994 contest due to a poor placing in the previous contest, which ultimately led to relegation. To this point, its best placing was third, achieved in 1997 with the song "Dinle" performed by Sebnem Paker and Grup Etnik. Its least successful result was in 1987 when it placed 22nd (last) with the song "Şarkım Sevgi Üstüne" by Seyyal Taner and Lokomotif, receiving 0 points in total.

As part of its duties as participating broadcaster, TRT organises the selection of its entry in the Eurovision Song Contest and broadcasts the event in the country. Since its debut at the contest in 1975, the broadcaster selected their representative through a national final with the exception of 1980 when the artist was internally selected. In order to select its entry for the 2002 contest, TRT once again opted to organise a national final to select both the artist and song.

== Before Eurovision ==
=== 25. Eurovision Şarkı Yarışması Türkiye Finali ===
TRT organised the national final 25. Eurovision Şarkı Yarışması Türkiye Finali in order to select its entry for the Eurovision Song Contest 2002. The broadcaster opened a submission period for interested artists and songwriters to submit their entries, which were required to be written in Turkish, for the competition until 26 November 2001 and 195 submissions were received at the closing of the deadline. A ten-member committee selected five entries from the received submissions to compete in the national final, which took place on 15 February 2002 at the TRT Arı Studio in Ankara, hosted by Ömer Önder and Nazli Meltem Ersan and broadcast on TRT 1 as well as TRT Int. The winner, "Leylaklar Soldu Kalbinde" performed by Buket Bengisu and Grup Safir, was determined by the votes of a ten-member jury panel. In addition to the performances of the competing entries, Turkish representatives Sertab Erener (2003), Pınar Ayhan (2000), and Sedat Yüce (2001) performed as guests.

Final – 15 February 2002
R/O	Artist	Song	Songwriter(s)	Points	Place
1	Buket Bengisu and Grup Safir	"Leylaklar Soldu Kalbinde"	Samih Hodara, Figen Çakmak, Fani Hodara	10	1
2	Grup Dolunay	"Güneş Doğarken"	Akın Bayraktaroğlu	0	2
3	Ayça Dönmez	"Sarıl Bana"	Ayça Dönmez	0	2
4	Cenk Yeles and Grubu	"Son Şans"	Cenk Yeles	0	2
5	Semih Bayraktar and Grubu	"Ne Olursun Bir Şeyler Söyle"	Semih Bayraktar	0	2

== At Eurovision ==
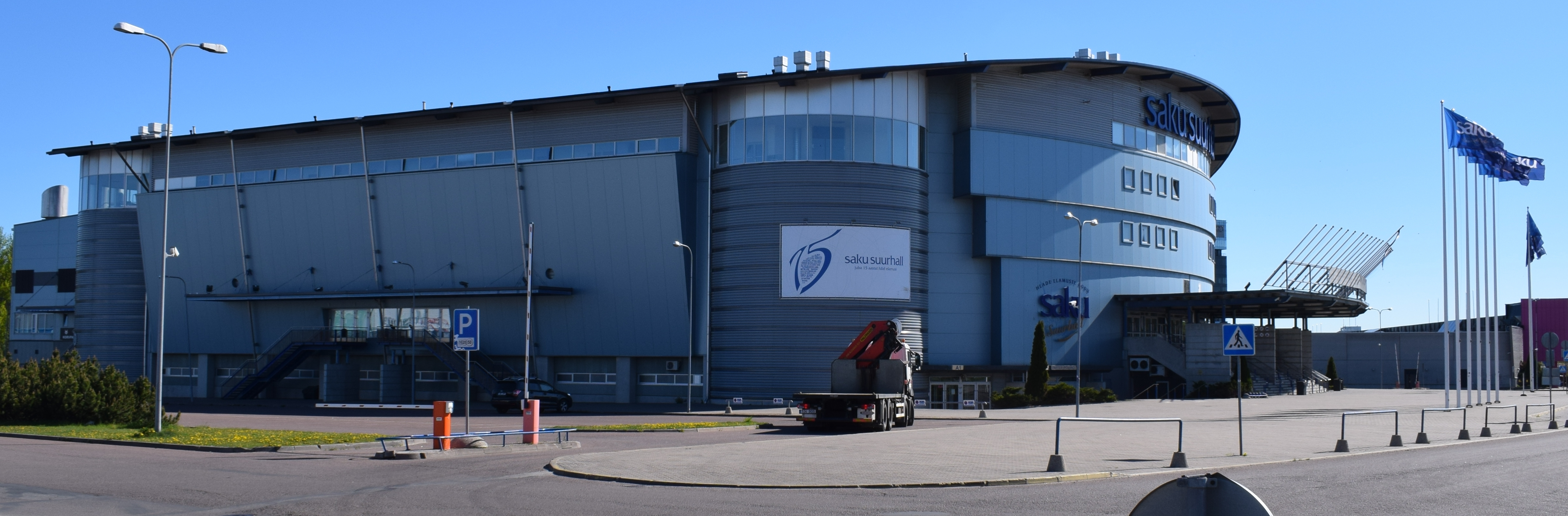
The Eurovision Song Contest 2002 took place at Saku Suurhall in Tallinn, Estonia.

The Eurovision Song Contest 2002 took place at Saku Suurhall in Tallinn, Estonia, on 25 May 2002. The participants list included the previous year's winning country, the "Big Four" countries, consisting of France, Germany, Spain, and the United Kingdom, any eligible countries which did not compete in the 2001 contest, and countries which had obtained the highest average points total at the previous year's contest, up to 24 total participants. On 9 November 2001, an allocation draw was held which determined the running order and Turkey was set to perform in position 19, following the entry from Germany and before the entry from Malta. Turkey finished in sixteenth place scoring 29 points.

The contest was broadcast in Turkey on TRT 1 and TRT Int with commentary by Ömer Önder.

=== Voting ===
Below is a breakdown of points awarded to Turkey and awarded by Turkey in the contest. The nation awarded its 12 points to Austria in the contest. TRT appointed Meltem Ersan Yazgan as its spokesperson to announce the results of the Turkish jury.

Points awarded to Turkey
Score	Country
12 points	
10 points	
8 points	Macedonia
7 points	France; Romania
6 points	
5 points	
4 points	Spain
3 points	Croatia
2 points	
1 point	

Points awarded by Turkey
Score	Country
12 points	Austria
10 points	Belgium
8 points	Estonia
7 points	Romania
6 points	Latvia
5 points	Malta
4 points	Sweden
3 points	Germany
2 points	United Kingdom
1 point	Denmark
