= Kaare Norge =

Danish classical guitarist (born 1963)

Kaare Norge (born 1963) is a Danish classical guitarist.

In 1991, he became the first classical musician to play at the Roskilde Festival. Although he has recorded a very broad repertory of classical works, and is well known for his recitals of composers such as Chopin and Bach, he has received the most international attention for the arrangement of Led Zeppelin's "Stairway to Heaven" which he recorded on his 1994 CD La Guitarra.

== Discography ==
- 1991 - Tango
- 1992 - Con Amore
- 1993 - Bach, Rodrigo, Paganini
- 1994 - La Guitarra
- 1996 - Movements
- 1996 - Guitar Player
- 1998 - Made of Dreams (with Claus Raahauge)
- 1998 - Morning Has Broken
- 1998 - Classic
- 1999 - Christmas
- 2000 - La Cumparsita
- 2001 - A Mi Amor
- 2002 - Guitarra La Classica
- 2003 - Here Comes the Sun
- 2004 - Silence of the Spanish Guitar
- 2005 - Recital
- 2006 - Fantasia
- 2006 - Portrait of an artist (DVD-video, produced and filmed by Jesper Brinck)
- 2009 - Viva La Musica
- 2011 - Beatles from My Heart
- 2011 - Denmark
- 2013 - Fiesta
- 2015 - The Song The Melody – Carl Nielsen
- 2018 - Variation
- 2021 - Amoroso
