= Laura Voutilainen =

Finnish pop singer (born 1975)

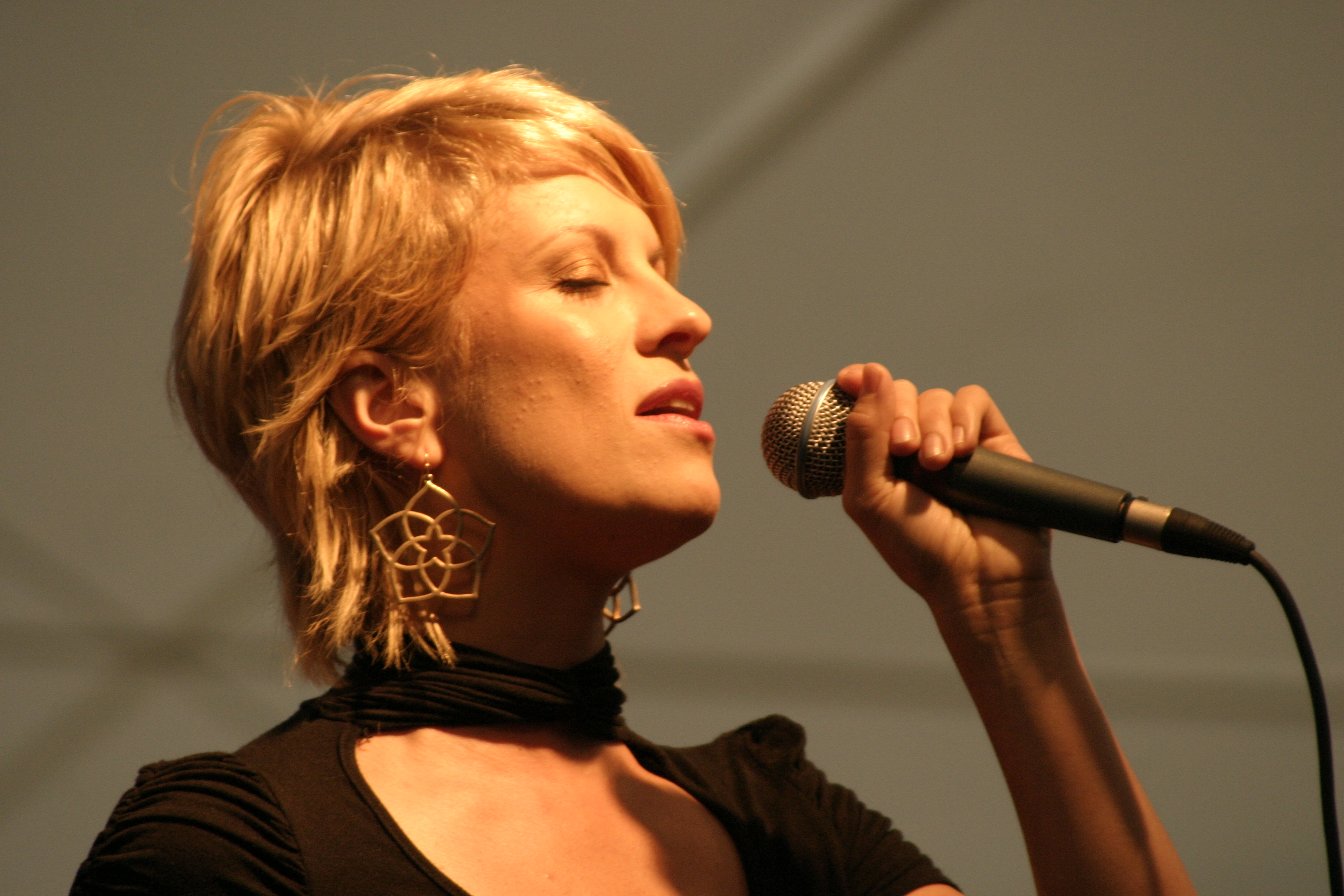

Background information
- Born: Sanna Laura Heikkilä o.s Voutilainen; 17 May 1975 (age 51); Jyväskylä
- Genres: Schlager music, pop
- Occupation: Singer
- Years active: 1993–present
- Label: Warner Music Finland
- Website: www.lauravoutilainen.fi

Sanna Laura Voutilainen (born 17 May 1975 in Jyväskylä) is a Finnish pop singer.

== Career ==
Voutilainen's debut single was called "Muuttanut oot maailmain" but her breakthrough came with the 1993 single "Kerran" which reached the Top Ten of the Finnish charts in January 1994. Also in 1994 the singer's debut album Laura Voutilainen was released selling in excess of 120,000 units; Voutilainen was consequently honored as Finland's top female vocalist with the Emma Award for 1994, an honor she again earned for the year 1996. Voutilainen has released a total of six albums and since 1999 she has hosted a TV show of her own.

Voutilainen participated in the Finnish national preliminary round for Eurovision 2002 with the song "Addicted to You". With 46 points awarded by the jury and 36% of the public vote "Addicted to You" easily won the right to represent Finland at Eurovision 2002: despite heavy promotion - reportedly the most ever afforded a Finnish Eurovision entrant - and high expectations for its Eurovision placing, "Addicted to You" finished Eurovision 2002 in twentieth place out of a field of twenty-four and failed to reach the Finnish Top Ten, stalling at #11.

In 2007 Voutilainen made a bid to again represent Finland at Eurovision participating in Euroviisut 2007, the Finnish national preliminary for Eurovision 2007. Voutilainen was one of twelve contenders at Euroviisut 2007 each of whom sang two songs in the semi-finals with one of each contender's songs being advanced to the final: of Voutilainen's two semi-final numbers: "Kosketa Mua" and "Take a Chance", the last-named advanced to the Euroviisut 2007 final where it placed fourth.

== Discography ==
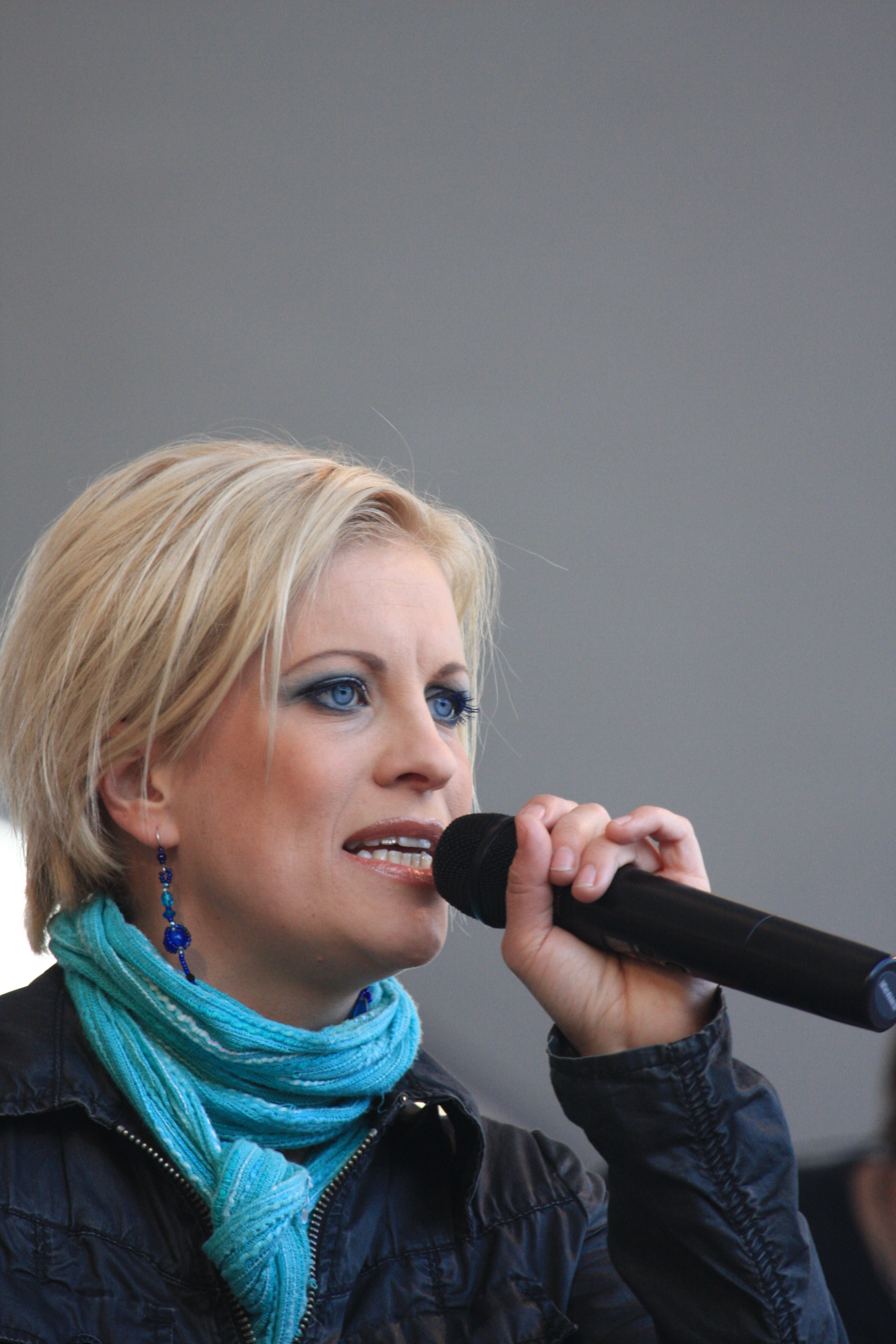
Laura Voutilainen (2008)

=== Albums ===
- Laura Voutilainen (1994)
- Kaksi karttaa (Two Maps) (1996)
- Lumikuningatar (Snowqueen) (1997) - Christmas album
- Etelän yössä (In the Southern Night) (1998)
- Puolet sun auringosta (Half of Your Sun) (2001 / Eurovision edition 2002)
- Päiväkirja (Diary) (2003)
- Tässä hetkessä (In This Moment) (2005)
- Lauran päiväkirja (Laura's Diary) (2006) - collection
- Kosketa mua (Touch me) (2007)
- Palaa (Come back) (2008)
- Sydänjää (Heart Ice) (2009)
- Suurimmat Hitit (Biggest Hits) (2010)
- Ihmeitä (Wonders) (2011)
- KokoNainen (Whole Woman) (2013)
- Miks ei (2017)
- Minun tähteni (2019)

=== EPs ===
- Lauran joulu (2005)

=== Singles ===
- "Addicted to You" (2002)
- "Miks Ei" (2016)

== Dubbing ==
Year	Film	Role	Notes
1997	Hercules	Megara	Finnish voice-dub
2005	Madagascar	Gloria	Finnish voice-dub
2007	Bee Movie	Vanessa Bloome	Finnish voice-dub
2008	Madagascar 2	Gloria	Finnish voice-dub
2010	The Princess and the Frog	Tiana (singing voice)	Finnish voice-dub
2010	Merry Madagascar	Gloria	Finnish voice-dub
2012	Madagascar 3	Gloria	Finnish voice-dub
2024	Wicked	Elphaba	Finnish voice-dub

== See also ==
- List of best-selling music artists in Finland

Preceded by Nina Åström with A Little Bit	Finland in the Eurovision Song Contest; 2002	Succeeded by Jari Sillanpää with Takes 2 To Tango
