= Aikakone =

Finnish pop music group

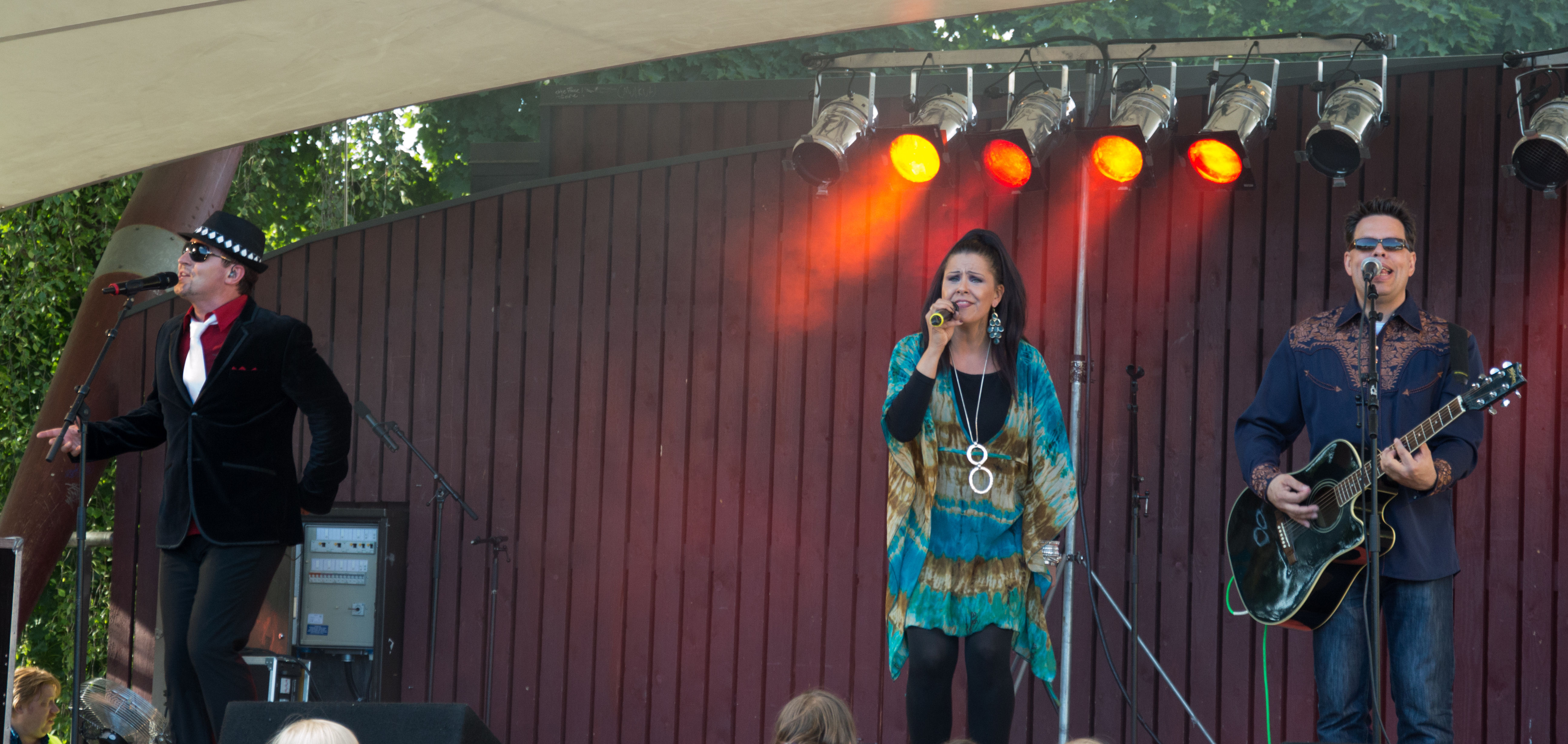
- Aikakone performing in 2012

Background information
- Also known as: Aika
- Origin: Finland
- Genres: Eurodance; pop
- Years active: 1995–1998; 2001–2003; 2008–present
- Labels: BMG
- Members: Saija Aartela; Heidi Puurula; Alex Ojasti; Marko Kolehmainen

Aikakone (Finnish for time machine) is a Finnish pop music group active from 1995 to 1998 and shortly in 2001 and 2003 as Aika. In 2003, they changed their name back to Aikakone and have since been active on and off.

Their debut album Tähtikaaren taa went triple platinum in Finland, the follow-up, Toiseen maailmaan, double platinum, their third, Maa, went platinum, and their fourth album, Hear Me Now, went gold.

Aikakone was awarded the Newcomer of the Year Emma award in 1995. They were also selected the best band of the year in 1995 in a vote on Radiomafia.

== Band members ==
- Sani (Saija Aartela)
- Vera (Heidi Puurula)
- Alex (Alex Ojasti)
- Maki (Marko Kolehmainen)

== Discography ==
=== Studio albums ===
Name	Album details	Peak chart position	Sales
Name	Album details	The Official Finnish Charts	Sales
Tähtikaaren taa	Released: 4 September 1995; Label: BMG Finland; Formats: CD, CS, Digital download	#1	134 900+ (Multi-platinum)
Toiseen maailmaan	Released: 12 October 1996; Label: BMG Finland; Formats: CD, CS, Digital download	#1	98 000+ (Double platinum)
Maa	Released: 8 October 1998; Label: BMG Finland; Formats: CD, Digital download	#7	47 600+ (Platinum)
Hear Me Now	Released: 31 August 2001; Label: BMG Finland; Formats: CD, Digital download	#15	13 100+
Vuosisadan rakkaustarina	Released: 20 January 2010; Label: Universal; Formats: CD, Digital download	–	10 000+ (Gold)
2.0	Released: 23 October 2015; Label: Sony Music; Formats: 2CD, Digital download	–	–

=== Compilations ===
Name	Album details	Peak chart position	Sales
Name	Album details	The Official Finnish Charts	Sales
Pophitit 1995–2003	Released: 23 May 2003; Label: BMG Finland; Formats: CD, Digital download	#13	–
Greatest Hits	Released: 28 February 2008; Label: Sony BMG; Formats: 2CD, Digital download	#23	–

=== Singles ===
Year	Title	Peak chart position	Album
1995	"Tähtikaaren taa"	10	Tähtikaaren taa
1995	"Taas saan lentää"	15	Tähtikaaren taa
1995	"Alla vaahterapuun" (Promosingle)	–	Tähtikaaren taa
1995	"Odota"	2	Tähtikaaren taa
1996	"Matkustanut oon"	4	Tähtikaaren taa
1996	"Keltainen" (Promosingle)	–	Toiseen maailmaan
1996	"Nti Groove"	4	Toiseen maailmaan
1996	"Opettelen salaa"	–	Toiseen maailmaan
1997	"Aarresaari"	–	Toiseen maailmaan
1997	"Time"	–	Non-album single
1998	"Tulisitko"	8	Maa
1998	"Magiaa"/ "Perhosten yö"	–	Maa
1998	"Hiljaisuus"	–	Maa
1999	"Anna mun bailaa"	1	Maa
2001	"Little by Little"	–	Hear Me Now
2001	"Hear Me Now"	9	Hear Me Now
2001	"Wonder Why"	–	Hear Me Now
2001	"Glittering Lights"	–	Hear Me Now
2002	"Stay"	–	Non-album single
2003	"Uudet tuulet"	–	Pophitit 1995–2003
2008	"Vuoristorata"	–	Greatest Hits
2008	"Odota (Remix 2008)"	–	Greatest Hits
2010	"Vuosisadan rakkaustarina"	–	Vuosisadan rakkaustarina
2010	"Linnunradalla"	–	Vuosisadan rakkaustarina
2012	"Historiaan"	–	Non-album single
2012	”Nirvana”	–	Non-album single
2015	"Liian vanha"	–	2.0

== See also ==
- List of best-selling music artists in Finland
