= Signe Svendsen =

Danish singer (born 1974)

Signe Svendsen (born 16 October 1974) is a Danish singer. She took part in Eurovision Song Contest 2001 with the duo formation Rollo & King singing "Never Ever Let You Go" that was runner-up in the competition. She has developed a solo career with release of two albums.

== Career ==
Svendsen graduated from Nyborg Gymnasium and Rytmisk Musikkonservatorium in 1998. She gained fame through her participation in Eurovision Song Contest in 2001.

She continued on with a solo career and toured with Niels Hausgaard in 2007-2010 releasing Ny passager, her debut solo album in 2010. She wrote or co-wrote eight of the ten titles of the album. She promoted the album with a tour later releasing recordings from the tour in her 2011 album Live 2010. In June 2012, she released the single "Din Sang" (meaning Your Song) from her second album Kun de faldne rejser sig igen on 9 September 2013 that reached Top 3 in Tracklisten, the official Danish Albums Chart.

Svendsen has also appeared in a number of Danish television programs, including Spørg Charlie (Ask Charlie) and Signe og B.S. på afveje (with B. S. Christiansen).

== Discography ==
=== Albums ===
Year	Album	Peak positions	Certification
Year	Album	DEN	Certification
2010	Ny passager	12	
2013	Kun de faldne rejser sig igen	3	

Live albums

- 2011: Live 2010

=== Singles ===
Year	Single	Peak positions	Album
Year	Single	DEN	Album
2012	"Din Sang"	–	

featured in

Year	Single	Peak positions	Album
Year	Single	DEN	Album
2001	"Never Ever Let You Go" (Credited to Rollo & King)	3	
