= Taina Kokkonen =

Finnish singer (born 1975)

- Born: 15 May 1975 (age 50); Vantaa near Helsinki, Finland
- Occupation: singer
- Spouse: Cemo Timucin (m. 2007)
- Children: 1 son

Taina Kokkonen (born 15 May 1975 in Vantaa near Helsinki, Finland) is a former award-winning Finnish singer.

She has performed on Italian TV, in Brussels, Argentina and Uruguay as part of the Tango 2000 educational tour.

She first tried for the prestigious Tangomarkkinat competition in 1995, but did not reach the semi-finals. In 1996, she got through the Raisio semi-finals and was one of the 10 best. She rather frightened herself with her success:

"I was in a great panic. I thought, do I really want this? . . . . I secretly hoped I wouldn't get any further. I have watched my performance on video and it shows how inexperienced I was." (Nyman, p. 175)

She did not reach the Seinäjoki finals, and Saija Varjus became Tango Queen. Taina's third attempt was in 1998, when she reached the finals and became Tango Princess, losing the winning place to Kirsi Ranto. After a record four attempts, she finally became Tango Queen in 1999.

In 2002, taking advantage of the new rule that songs may be in any language, she composed an Italian-language entry for the Eurovision Song Contest. This was Silenzio, and was performed by Pertti Haverinen; but it was not selected, and the Finnish entry for that year was the English-language "Addicted to You", sung by Laura, which came 20th with 24 points.

Before she became a Tango Queen in Seinäjoki, Kokkonen had finished her studies for a degree in Master of Education Sciences. She became a teacher in Hämeenlinna.

At the moment, she works as a class teacher in Vantaa. In 2007, Kokkonen married Cemo Timucin, a man working in an IT-branch and educated as a Master of engineering. They live in Vantaa with their son Tino.

In 2009, Taina Kokkonen worked during the summertime as a radio-host having morning programs in a local radio station near Helsinki resort.

The singer, Taina Kokkonen, is not the same person as Taina Kokkonen the printmaker, whose website is http://www.tainakokkonen.net.

== Discography ==
- 2000 Vain taivas tietää
- 2001 Täätä ikuisuuteen
- 2003 20 hittiä (reissue)

== Sources ==
- Marja Nyman, Tangokuninkaalliset, Revontuli 2002, ISBN 952-5170-27-6
- Tony Latva and Petri Tuunainen, Iskelmän tähtitaivas, WSOY 2004, ISBN 951-0-27817-3
- Asko Murtomäki, Finland 12 points!, Teos 2007, ISBN 978-951-851-106-2
