= Malene Mortensen =

Danish singer (born 1982)

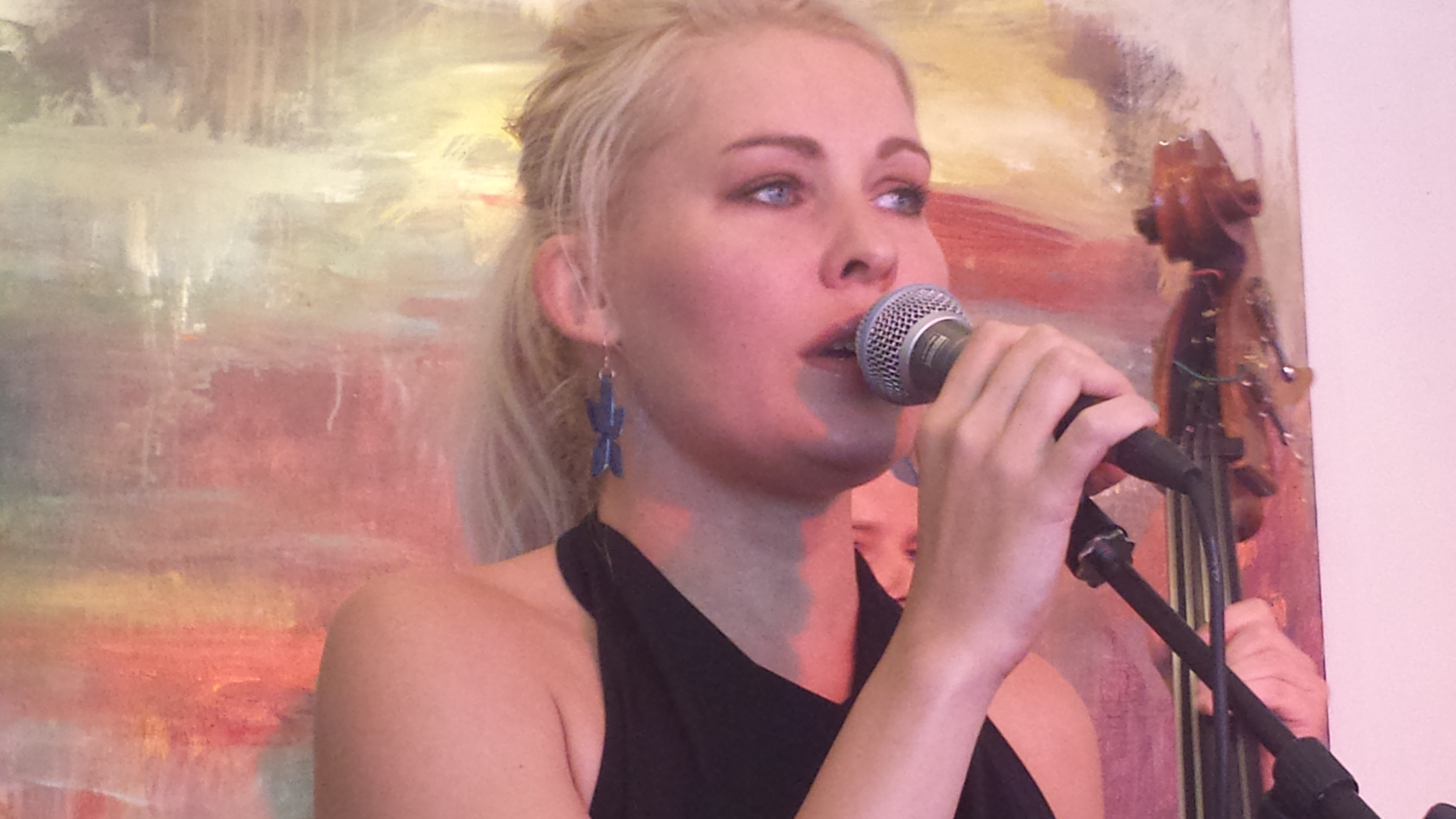
- Mortensen during Copenhagen Jazz Festival 2016

Background information
- Born: Malene Winther Mortensen; 23 May 1982 (age 44); Denmark
- Genres: Jazz, pop
- Occupation: Singer
- Instrument: Vocals
- Label: Stunt

Malene Winther Mortensen (born 23 May 1982) is a Danish singer.

She entered the Danish music scene in 2001, during the first season of Stjerne for en aften, the Danish edition of Star for a Night. She made it to the finals, with her rendition of Moloko's "Sing It Back". The following year, she entered the Dansk Melodi Grand Prix, the Danish national pre-selection for the Eurovision Song Contest.

In 2003 she released her debut album called Paradise. This album, revolving around modern jazz, was supported by three of Denmark's best known jazz musicians: Niels Lan Doky (piano), Niels-Henning Ørsted Pedersen (double bass) and Alex Riel (drums).

== Discography ==
- Paradise (Universal Music, 2003)
- Date with a Dream (Stunt Records, 2005)
- Malene (Stunt, 2006)
- Desperado (Stunt, 2007)
- To All of You (Stunt, 2007)
- Agony & Ecstasy (Stunt, 2009)
- You Go to My Head (2012)
- Still in Love with You (Hitman Jazz, 2012) (released only in Thailand)
- Can't Help It (Stunt, 2015)
- You Belong To Me (Hitman Jazz, 2016)

Preceded by Rollo & King with Never Ever Let You Go	Denmark in the Eurovision Song Contest; 2002	Succeeded by Tomas Thordarson with Shame on You
