= Karoliina Kallio =

Finnish singer

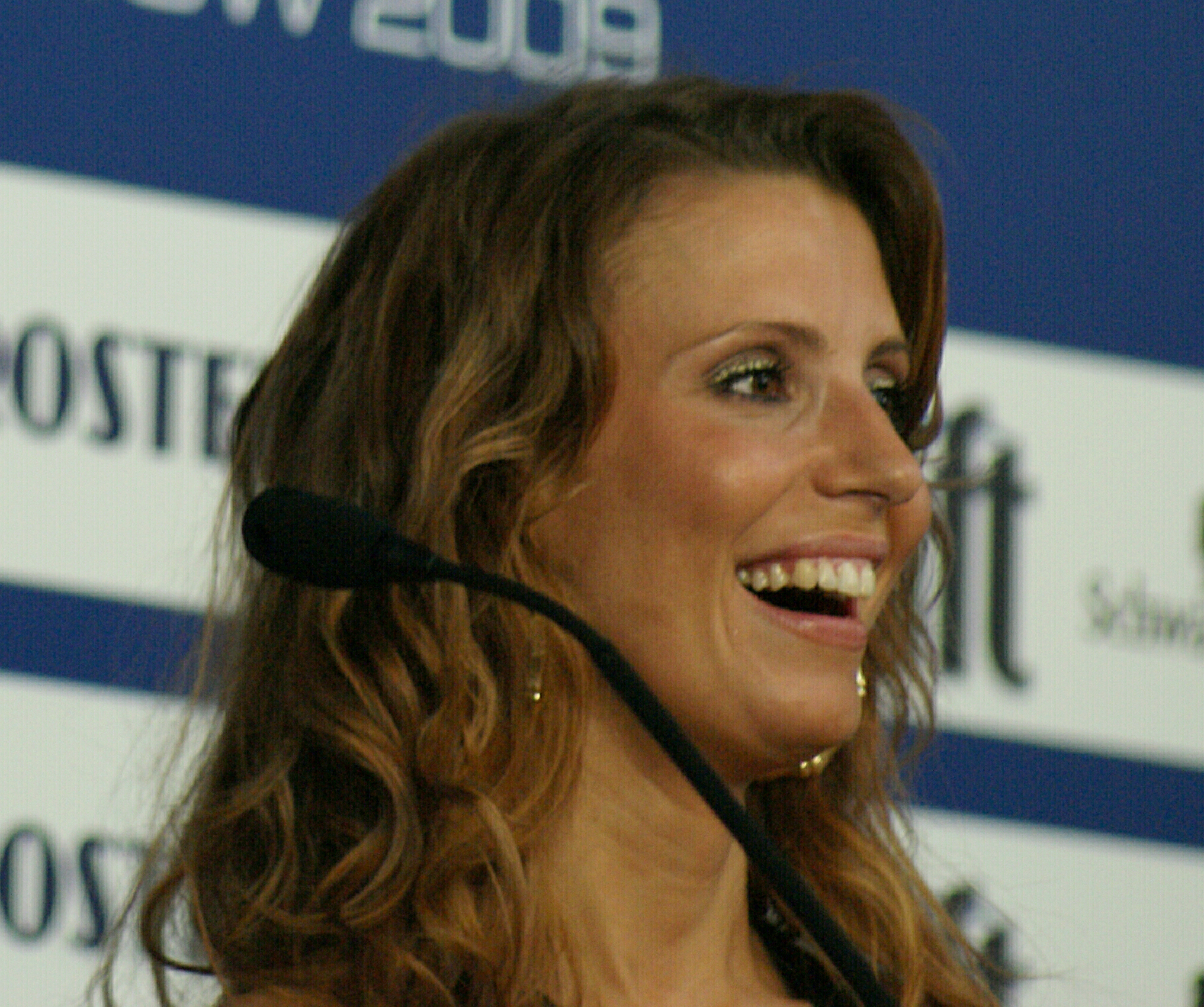
Karoliina Kallio

Karoliina Kallio (born 31 August 1979 in Savonlinna) is a Finnish singer and current female lead singer of Waldo's People. The group represented Finland in the Eurovision Song Contest 2009 in the first semifinal on 12 May and qualified for the final. They finished in last position.
