= Maria Guzenina =

Finnish politician (born 1969)

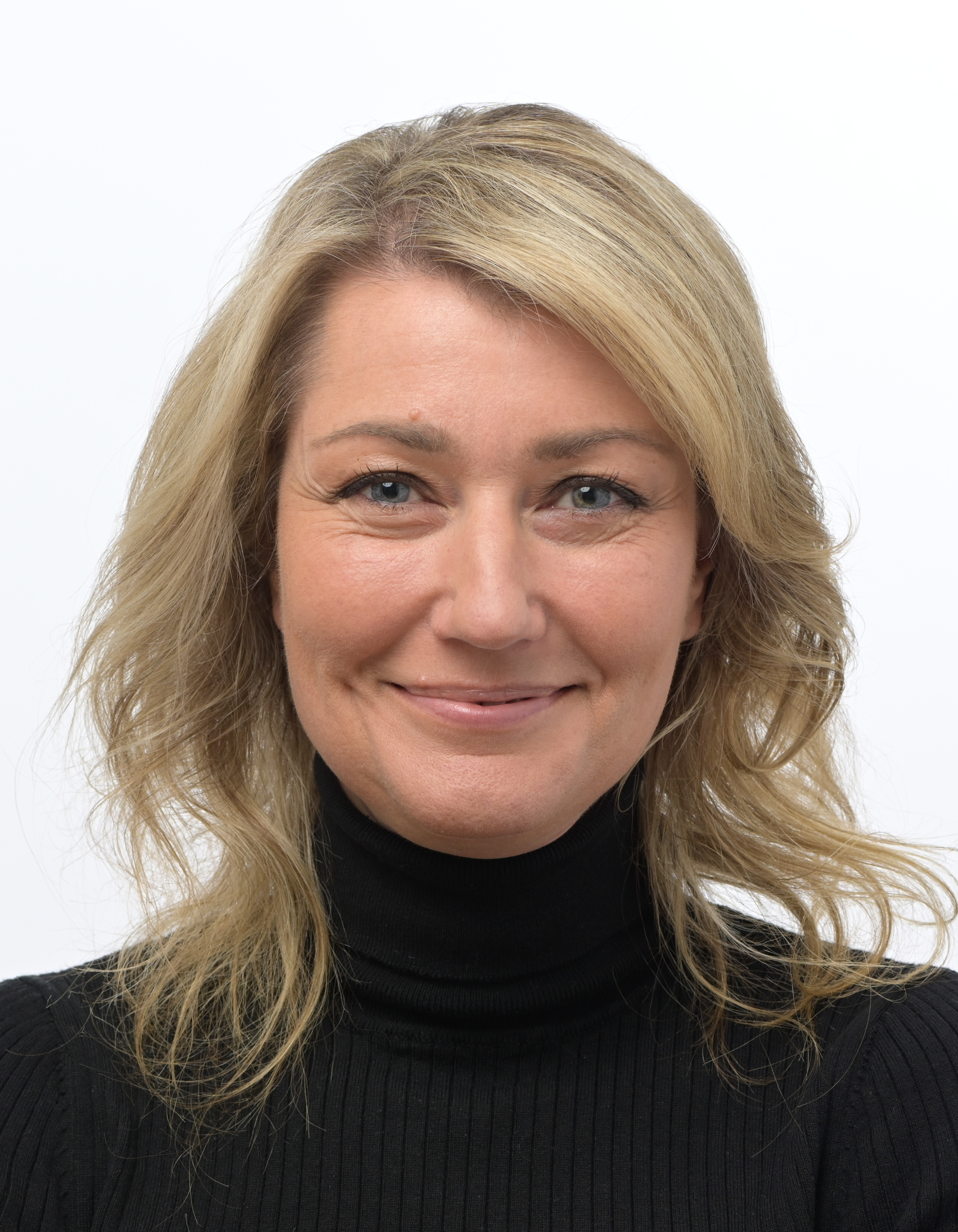

Minister of Social Services
- In office 22 June 2011 – 24 May 2013
- Preceded by: Paula Risikko
- Succeeded by: Susanna Huovinen

Member of Parliament
- In office 2007–2024
- Constituency: Uusimaa

Member of the European Parliament
- Incumbent
- Assumed office 16 July 2024
- Preceded by: Miapetra Kumpula-Natri
- Constituency: Finland

Personal details
- Born: 12 January 1969 (age 57) Helsinki, Uusimaa, Finland
- Party: Finnish; Social Democratic Party; EU; Progressive Alliance of Socialists and Democrats
- Children: Alexander (b. 1999)
- Occupation: Journalist

Maria Edith Guzenina (née Stieren, previously Guzenina-Richardson and Lindell; born 12 January 1969 in Helsinki, Finland) is a Finnish politician who became a household name in Finland after working as the first Finnish video jockey for MTV Europe from 1993 until 1997. Her career in journalism started in the late 1980s, when only at the age of 17 and still a student in high school she became a co-host of a famous Finnish television personality Timo T. A. Mikkonen in his daily magazine-type program. Since then she has hosted several television programs and shows for the Finnish National Broadcasting Company, hosted several radio talk shows and has written articles and columns for numerous Finnish newspapers and magazines.

Guzenina has been a member of the Parliament of Finland since 2007. She worked as a Minister of Health and Social Services from 22 June 2011 to 24 May 2013.

== Career in journalism ==
Guzenina worked as a radio journalist in the now-defunct Radio Aino and Yle Q, which were both AOR radio stations targeted at the thirty-something and forty-something demographics. On the radio she could be heard leading a daily talk show discussing current issues with politicians and experts and in addition cohosting a programme with a man about the pitfalls of relationships for couples. Guzenina wrote a humorous book on the subject with Seppo Pietikäinen, titled Parisuhteen käsikirja ('A manual for relationships') and published in 2005.

== Political career ==
Guzenina's later career has involved politics within the ranks of the Social Democratic Party of Finland. Her political agenda centers on families, childcare and social services.

She was elected as a member of the Espoo municipal council in 2004 and a Member of Parliament in the spring elections of 2007. She gained 12578 votes, the 10th most in the country. In June 2008 Guzenina was elected as the second deputy chairman of the SDP. She was re-elected to the parliament in 2011 with 14581 votes, which was the most votes amongst female candidates and 7th in the whole country.

After the election, she was appointed Minister of Social Services (the second minister position in the Ministry of Social Affairs and Health) in the government of Prime Minister Jyrki Katainen. The Social Democratic Party announced after the 2011 elections that it will likely reshuffle its ministers halfway through the term. Of the six SDP ministers, three, including Guzenina, were swapped in May 2013. She was replaced by Susanna Huovinen.

In addition to her role in parliament, Guzenina has been serving as a member of the Finnish delegation to the Parliamentary Assembly of the Council of Europe since 2013. She is currently the Vice-President of the Assembly (since 2015) and the Third Vice-Chairperson of the Committee on Political Affairs and Democracy. She is also a member of the Committee on the Honouring of Obligations and Commitments by the Member States of the Council of Europe (Monitoring Committee) and the Sub-Committee on the Middle East and the Arab World. Alongside Samad Seyidov of Azerbaijan, she serves as the Assembly’s co-rapporteur on Serbia.

== Personal life ==
Guzenina first married at the age of 18 to Finnish businessman John Lindell, and then subsequently married an American man named Randolpf Bowes.

Her third marriage to British musician Mark Richardson, the drummer of Skunk Anansie fame, ended in 2001 due to the spouse's alleged infidelity. Custody of their joint child Alexander was entrusted to Guzenina who allows paternal visits. During 2004–2006, Guzenina was in a relationship with Finnish footballer Tommi Paavola. She was subsequently engaged to Finnish businessman Mika Walkamo (fi) for over six months until August 2010. Since 2015 she cohabits with Finnish journalist Kari Mokko (fi).

Guzenina has given interviews in Finland about her dysfunctional family. Born to a Finnish father (who was of German descent through his mother) and a Russian mother from Ulan-Ude, she was raised by her single mother as an only child. In the spring of 2013, Russia accused Finland of mistreating Russian-origin families in the child welfare services. Guzenina replied that in Finland all are treated equally and one can even become a minister with Russian background. Guzenina is fluent in Russian, Finnish and English.

Before she became an MTV video jockey, Guzenina co-hosted the Kolmoskanava talk show Tänään, tässä ja nyt (fi) with Timo T. A. Mikkonen (fi) from 1987–1989, and also worked as a freelance journalist for Radio City, YLE Radio Aino and Radio Nova. She also hosted an advertising campaign (1994-1995) about study and job prospects in Europe with an educational rather than entertaining emphasis.

Guzenina is a high school graduate. She is an Orthodox Christian.

In 2014 she dropped the name Richardson from her official surname.
