= Yle Radio Suomi =

Finnish radio station

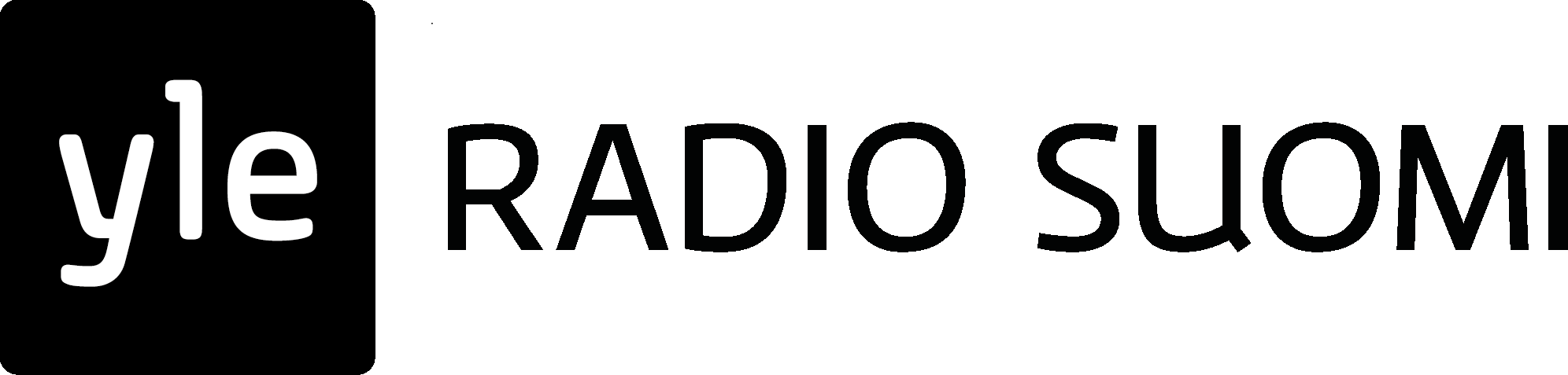
- Finland
- Frequency: FM 93.1–100.3

Programming
- Language: Finnish
- Format: Music and sport

Ownership
- Owner: Yleisradio

History
- First air date: 1 June 1990
- Former names: Rinnakkaisohjelma (1960–1985); Kakkosverkko (1985–1990)

Links
- Website: areena.yle.fi/podcastit/ohjelmat/yle-radio-suomi

Yle Radio Suomi is a radio channel owned and operated by Finland's national public service broadcaster Yleisradio (Yle). The station's main focus is on music and sport, but it carries a variety of other programmes, including news and phone-ins, as well as up to eight hours a day of regional programming on weekdays. The channel is also noted for its live coverage of music festivals. Radio Suomi is the most listened radio station in Finland with a market share of 51 percent.

== Regional presence ==
As of 2025, Radio Suomi broadcasts all of its content from either the Pasila headquarters, or from Tampere during 6-10 AM and 2-6 PM. During the PM slot, each of the 18 regional news desks join the broadcast twelve times to share regional content. During these windows, their feed is only broadcast to their respective regions. This means that listeners in Helsinki will hear content from Helsinki, while listeners in Oulu will hear content from Oulu.

== History ==
Yle Radio Suomi was established on 1 June 1990 – as part of Yle's restructuring of its radio channels – to be a national network bringing together the country's 20 regional stations. It is the legal successor of the former Rinnakkaisohjelma radio channel, originally established in 1960 as Yle's second national radio channel; later renamed Kakkosverkko (lit. Programme 2) in 1985. In 2003, the channel's music policy was shifted with the aim of attracting a younger audience. Yle Radio Suomi has consistently been Finland's most listened-to radio station, with 51% overall audience share in 2025. Historical data shows that the channel has had a 44% overall audience share in 1999 and a 33% overall share (higher among older listeners) in 2013–2014.
