= Spain in the Eurovision Song Contest 2002 =

- Eurovision Song Contest 2002
- Participating broadcaster: Televisión Española (TVE)
- Country: Spain
- Selection process: Operación Triunfo 1: Gala Eurovisión
- Selection date: 11 March 2002

Competing entry
- Song: "Europe's Living a Celebration"
- Artist: Rosa
- Songwriters: Toni Ten; Xasqui Ten

Placement
- Final result: 7th, 81 points

Participation chronology

Spain was represented at the Eurovision Song Contest 2002 with the song "Europe's Living a Celebration", written by Toni Ten and Xasqui Ten, and performed by Rosa. The Spanish participating broadcaster, Televisión Española (TVE), selected its entry through the first series of the reality television music competition Operación Triunfo. Three artists and songs ultimately qualified to compete in the final of the competition's Eurovision selection show where a public televote exclusively selected "Europe's Living a Celebration" performed by Rosa as the winner, receiving 49.9% of the votes.

As a member of the "Big Four", Spain automatically qualified to compete in the Eurovision Song Contest. Performing in position 5, Spain placed seventh out of the 24 participating countries with 81 points.

== Background ==
Prior to the 2002 contest, Televisión Española (TVE) had participated in the Eurovision Song Contest representing Spain forty-one times since its first entry in 1961. It has won the contest on two occasions: in 1968 with the song "La, la, la" performed by Massiel and in 1969 with the song "Vivo cantando" performed by Salomé, the latter having won in a four-way tie with France, the Netherlands, and the United Kingdom. It has also finished second four times, with "En un mundo nuevo" by Karina in 1971, "Eres tú" by Mocedades in 1973, "Su canción" by Betty Missiego in 1979, and "Vuelve conmigo" by Anabel Conde in 1995. In 2001, it placed sixth with the song "Dile que la quiero" performed by David Civera.

As part of its duties as participating broadcaster, TVE organises the selection of its entry in the Eurovision Song Contest and broadcasts the event in the country. In 2000 and 2001, TVE organised the national final Eurocanción, which featured a competition among several artists and songs. For their 2002 entry, TVE announced in July 2001 that they would organise a reality television singing competition titled Operación Triunfo (original series of Star Academy) to select both the artist and song that would represent Spain.

== Before Eurovision ==
=== Operación Triunfo 1 ===
The Spanish entry for the Eurovision Song Contest 2002 was selected through Operación Triunfo, a Spanish reality television music competition consisting of training sixteen contestants in a boarding academy in order to find new singing talent. The first series, also known as Operación Triunfo 1, took place from 22 October 2001 to 11 February 2002 at the Mediapark Studios in Sant Just Desvern (Barcelona), hosted by Carlos Lozano. The competition was broadcast on La Primera and TVE Internacional. The top three contestants qualified to compete in the Eurovision selection show, Gala Eurovisión, which consisted of three shows on 25 February, 4 March, and 11 March 2002. Each contestant performed three original songs and the winner was decided exclusively through a public televote. The competing songs and the allocations were announced on 21 February 2002.

Contestant qualified to "Gala Eurovisión"

Operación Triunfo 1
Contestant	Episode of eviction	Place finished (Overall ranking)
Rosa	Gala Final	1st
David Bisbal	Gala Final	2nd
David Bustamante	Gala Final	3rd
Chenoa	Gala Final	4th
Manu Tenorio	Gala Final	5th
Verónica	Gala Final	6th
Nuria Fergó	Gala 13	7th
Gisela	Gala 12	8th
Naím Thomas	Gala 11	9th
Àlex Casademunt	Gala 5 / Gala 10	10th
Alejandro Parreño	Gala 8	11th
Juan Camus	Gala 7	12th
Natalia	Gala 6	13th
Javián	Gala 4	14th
Mireia	Gala 3	15th
Geno	Gala 2	16th

==== Gala Eurovisión – Song selection ====
The song selection round of Gala Eurovisión consisted of two rounds of voting. In the first round which took place on 25 February 2002, an in-studio jury eliminated one song per contestant. The six members of the in-studio jury were Pilar Tabares (music director of TVE), Narcís Rebollo (CEO of Vale Music), José Luis Uribarri (television presenter and director, commentator of the Eurovision Song Contest for TVE), Marcos Llunas (singer and composer, represented Spain in 1997), Juan Luis Ayllón Piquero (Eurovision expert) and Daniel Aragay Esteban (Eurovision expert). In the second round which took place on 4 March 2002, a public televote eliminated an additional song per contestant. In addition to the performances of the competing entries, the guest performer in the first show was Lenny Kravitz, while the guest performer in the second show was Operación Triunfo 1 contestant Natalia.

First Round – 25 February 2002
R/O	Artist	Song	Songwriter(s)	Result
1	David Bustamante	"Urgente"	Javi Mota; Lidia Guevara; Sergio Medrano	—N/a
2	David Bisbal	"El alma en pie"	José Abraham	Advanced
3	Rosa	"Un sueño especial"	Toni Ten; Xasqui Ten	Advanced
4	David Bustamante	"Más de mil noches"	Jesús María Pérez; Amaya Martínez	Advanced
5	Rosa	"Hay que vivir"	Rubén Blades	—N/a
6	David Bisbal	"Corazón Latino"	Jordi Cubino	Advanced
7	David Bustamante	"La magia del corazón"	David DeMaría; Pablo Pinilla; David Santisteban	Advanced
8	Rosa	"Europe's Living a Celebration"	Toni Ten; Xasqui Ten	Advanced
9	David Bisbal	"Miénteme"	José Gaviria; Ossa Bernardo; Ximena Muñoz	—N/a

Second Round – 4 March 2002 – David Bisbal
R/O	Song	Televote	Place	Result
1	"El alma en pie"	18%	2	—N/a
4	"Corazón Latino"	82%	1	Qualified

Second Round – 4 March 2002 – David Bustamante
R/O	Song	Televote	Place	Result
2	"Más de mil noches"	35%	2	—N/a
5	"La magia del corazón"	65%	1	Qualified

Second Round – 4 March 2002 – Rosa
R/O	Song	Televote	Place	Result
3	"Un sueño especial"	30%	2	—N/a
6	"Europe's Living a Celebration"	70%	1	Qualified

==== Gala Eurovisión – Final ====
The final of Gala Eurovisión took place on 11 March 2002. The winner, "Europe's Living a Celebration" performed by Rosa, was selected exclusively through a public televote which ran between 4 and 11 March 2002. In addition to the performances of the competing entries, guest performers included the Pet Shop Boys, and the other contestants of Operación Triunfo 1, with all the contestants also performing together a medley of past Eurovision songs. (Note: The Eurovision medley consisted of: "La, la, la" by Geno, "Marionetas en la cuerda" by Mireia, "Congratulations" by Naím Thomas, "Vivo cantando" by Nuria Fergó, "Eres tú" by Rosa, "Waterloo" by Verónica and Natalia, "Canta y sé feliz" by Javián, "Save Your Kisses for Me" by Juan Camus and Chenoa, "Enséñame a cantar" by Manu Tenorio and Alejandro Parreño, "A-Ba-Ni-Bi" by Àlex Casademunt, "Diva" by Gisela, "Bailar pegados" by David Bustamante, and "Dile que la quiero" by David Bisbal.)

Final – 11 March 2002
R/O	Artist	Song	Televote	Place
1	David Bustamante	"La magia del corazón"	17.3%	3
2	David Bisbal	"Corazón latino"	32.8%	2
3	Rosa	"Europe's Living a Celebration"	49.9%	1

=== Official albums ===
Following the first Eurovision gala, Vale Music released a CD titled Operación Triunfo: Gala Eurovisión featuring the audio of the live performances of the nine competing songs recorded during the gala. The album was the fifth best-selling album on the 2002 annual chart in Spain, selling over 400,000 copies and was certified four times platinum.

Vale Music later released a double CD titled Operación Triunfo: Álbum de Eurovisión featuring the studio recordings of the nine competing songs, the Eurovision medley performed in the final, and a selection of songs from the galas of Operación Triunfo 1. The double CD includes the final and official version of "Europe's Living a Celebration" performed by Rosa with the backing vocals provided by David Bisbal, David Bustamante, Chenoa, Gisela, and Geno, who would accompany her to the international contest; and a first music video for the song on a multimedia track. The album sold over 100,000 copies and was certified platinum.

== At Eurovision ==
As a member of the "Big Four", Spain automatically qualified to compete in the Eurovision Song Contest 2002 on 25 May 2002. During the allocation draw on 9 November 2001, Spain was drawn to perform in position 5, following the entry from Greece and before the entry from Croatia. At the contest, Rosa was joined on stage by five backing vocalists who were contestants in Operación Triunfo 1: David Bisbal, David Bustamante, Chenoa, Gisela, (Note: Gisela would go on to represent Andorra in 2008.) and Geno, and placed seventh at the conclusion of the final scoring 81 points.

In Spain, the show was broadcast on La Primera with commentary by José Luis Uribarri and on Radio 1 with commentary by Nieves Herrero and José María de Juana. The voting sequence was followed in Spain by an average of 14.38 million viewers, which represented an 86.2% share, becoming the most watched space in the country of the entire decade. The entire show, with an average of 12.7 million viewers and an 80.4% share, is the most watched Eurovision in Spain since reliable audience measurements began to be made in 1992.

=== Voting ===
Below is a breakdown of points awarded to Spain and awarded by Spain in the contest. The nation awarded its 12 points to Latvia in the contest. TVE appointed Anne Igartiburu as its spokesperson to announce the Spanish votes during the final; the Spanish votes consisted of 50 percent public televoting and 50 percent from a jury deliberation.

Points awarded to Spain
Score	Country
12 points	Belgium; France; Switzerland
10 points	
8 points	
7 points	Cyprus; Germany; Sweden
6 points	Bosnia and Herzegovina; Croatia; Israel
5 points	
4 points	Greece
3 points	
2 points	United Kingdom
1 point	

Points awarded by Spain
Score	Country
12 points	Latvia
10 points	Malta
8 points	France
7 points	Slovenia
6 points	Cyprus
5 points	Romania
4 points	Turkey
3 points	Bosnia and Herzegovina
2 points	Germany
1 point	Belgium
