= Operación Triunfo series 1 =

Operación Triunfo
- Series 1
- Hosted by: Carlos Lozano
- Judges: Pilar Tabares; Alejandro Abad; Narcís Rebollo
- Winner: Rosa López
- Runner-up: David Bisbal
- Location: Gestmusic studios Sant Just Desvern, (Barcelona)

Release
- Original network: La Primera
- Original release: 22 October 2001 – 18 February 2002

Series chronology
- Next → Series 2

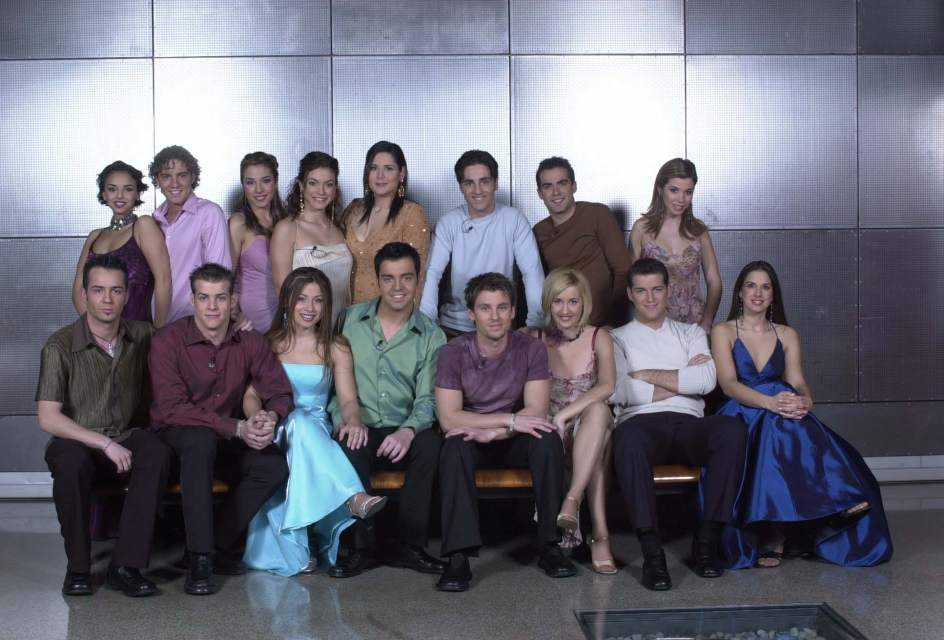
All the contestants of Operación Triunfo 1 at the Disney Gala. (Note: Back row, left to right: Chenoa, David Bisbal, Gisela, Geno, Rosa, David Bustamante, Naím Thomas, and Natalia. Front row, left to right: Alejandro Parreño, Àlex Casademunt, Verónica, Juan Camus, Javián, Mireia, Manu Tenorio, and Nuria Fergó.)

The first series of Operación Triunfo, known contemporaneously simply as Operación Triunfo or OT, and later known retrospectively as Operación Triunfo 1 or OT 1 to differentiate it from the rest of the series, was aired live on La Primera of Televisión Española from 22 October 2001 to 11 February 2002, and was presented by Carlos Lozano. The regular series was followed by a Disney Gala on 18 February 2002, three Eurovision Galas between 25 February and 11 March, a joint concert tour throughout Spain between 4 April and 4 June, a documentary film tilted OT: la película released on theaters on 20 September, and a three-episode reunion special and a concert to celebrate its 15th anniversary titled OT: el reencuentro in 2016.

The initial objective of this first series was to launch three musical careers and, in turn, choose the Spanish performer and entry for the Eurovision Song Contest 2002. Eventually, due to the enormous impact of the show, all the contestants received a car and secured a contract with a major record label for the release of their first album. Rosa López was the winner of the regular series, and she also won the Eurovision selection with the song "Europe's Living a Celebration".

The regular series had a total average audience of 6.947 million viewers (43.3% share), achieving an average of 12.873 million in the final gala (68.0% share). The CDs with the studio versions of each of the galas and the compilation albums were sales successes, with sales of between three and four million total, and contributed to improving the recorded music market in Spain. In addition to the cover versions, the contestants recorded together the original group songs "Mi música es tu voz" and "Vivimos la selección".

The format, which began as a weekly live gala on La Primera, and daily and weekly summaries of the contestants' activities at the academy on La 2, expanded as the audience grew, eventually including since Gala 2 a live chat on La Primera where the contestants, at the academy right after the gala, read the messages they had received, and starting on 27 December 2001, its own 24-hour thematic channel named Canal OT on Canal Satélite Digital, following live the contestants' daily activities at the academy. The contestants who were evicted each week continued their training off-camera, in separate facilities and without contact with those who remained in the competition. Once the regular series and the Eurovision galas were over, three monographic galas dedicated to each of the top-3 finalists were broadcast on La Primera, and between 15 April and 4 June 2002, eight weekly galas under the title Triunfomanía.

== Staff ==
- Academy headmaster: Nina
- Academy teachers: Helen Rowson (voice techniques and English pronunciation), Manu Guix (singing), Lawrence de Maeyer (body technique and dance), Javier Castillo (gala choreographer), Mayte Marcos (dance), Néstor Serra (physical trainer), and Àngel Llàcer (acting).
- Judges: Pilar Tabares, Alejandro Abad, and Narcís Rebollo
- Presenter: Carlos Lozano

== Contestants ==
Contestant	Age	Residence	Episode of eviction	Place finished
Rosa	20	Granada	Final Gala	Winner
David Bisbal	22	Almería	Final Gala	Runner-up
David Bustamante	19	San Vicente de la Barquera	Final Gala	3rd
Chenoa	26	Palma	Final Gala	4th
Manu Tenorio	26	Seville	Final Gala	5th
Verónica	23	Elche	Final Gala	6th
Nuria Fergó	22	Nerja	Gala 13	7th
Gisela	22	Barcelona	Gala 12	8th
Naím Thomas	21	Premià de Mar	Gala 11	9th
Àlex Casademunt	20	Vilassar de Mar	Gala 5 / Gala 10	10th
Alejandro Parreño	23	Valencia	Gala 8	11th
Juan Camus	28	Madrid	Gala 7	12th
Natalia	18	Sanlúcar de Barrameda	Gala 6	13th
Javián	27	Dos Hermanas	Gala 4	14th
Mireia	19	Vila-seca	Gala 3	15th
Geno	19	Gran Canaria	Gala 2	16th

== Galas ==
=== Results summary ===
Colour key
The contestant was the weekly public's favourite
The contestant was one of the most voted as the public's favourite
The contestant was nominated to leave the academy, but was saved by the teachers
The contestant was nominated to leave the academy, but was saved by the other contestants
The contestant was nominated to leave the academy, but the nominations were suspended
The contestant was nominated to leave the academy
The contestant was candidate to return to the academy
The contestant was evicted
Chosen as finalist
3rd finalist
2nd finalist
Winner

	Gala 1	Gala 2	Gala 3	Gala 4	Gala 5	Gala 6	Gala 7	Gala 8	Christmas	Gala 9	Gala 10	Gala 11	Gala 12	Gala 13	Final
Rosa	Favourite	Favourite	Favourite	Favourite	Favourite	Favourite	Saved	Favourite	Exempt	Saved	Favourite	Saved	Favourite	Finalist	Winner
Bisbal	Saved	Saved	Saved	Saved	Saved	Saved	Favourite	Saved	Exempt	Favourite	Saved	Favourite	Saved	Finalist	Runner-up
Bustamante	Saved	Saved	Saved	Saved	Saved	Saved	Saved	Nominated	Exempt	Saved	Nominated	Saved	Nominated	Finalist	3rd Place
Chenoa	Saved	Saved	Saved	Saved	Saved	Saved	Saved	Saved	Exempt	Saved	Saved	Saved	Saved	Finalist	4th place
Manu	Saved	Saved	Saved	Saved	Saved	Saved	Saved	Nominated	Exempt	Saved	Saved	Saved	Saved	Finalist	5th place
Verónica	Saved	Saved	Saved	Saved	Saved	Nominated	Saved	Nominated	Exempt	Saved	Saved	Nominated	Saved	Finalist	6th place
Nuria	Nominated	Saved	Saved	Saved	Saved	Saved	Saved	Saved	Exempt	Saved	Saved	Saved	Nominated	Evicted	
Gisela	Saved	Saved	Saved	Saved	Saved	Saved	Saved	Nominated	Exempt	Saved	Saved	Nominated	Evicted		
Naím	Saved	Saved	Saved	Saved	Saved	Saved	Nominated	Saved	Exempt	Nominated	Nominated	Evicted			
Àlex	Saved	Saved	Saved	Nominated	Evicted			Candidate	Final; Candidate	Nominated	Evicted				
Juan	Saved	Nominated	Nominated	Nominated	Saved	Nominated	Evicted	Candidate	Final; Candidate	Evicted					
Alejandro	Saved	Saved	Saved	Saved	Nominated	Saved	Nominated	Candidate	Evicted						
Natalia	Saved	Saved	Saved	Saved	Nominated	Evicted		Candidate	Evicted						
Javián	Saved	Saved	Nominated	Evicted				Candidate	Evicted						
Mireia	Saved	Nominated	Evicted					Candidate	Evicted						
Geno	Nominated	Evicted						Candidate	Evicted						
Up for nomination	Àlex; Geno; Javián; Nuria	Alejandro; Gisela; Juan; Mireia	Alejandro; Javián; Juan; Natalia	Àlex; Juan; Naím; Natalia	Alejandro; Manu; Natalia; Verónica	Alejandro; Juan; Nuria; Verónica	Alejandro; Bustamante; Naím; Verónica	Bustamante; Manu; Verónica; Gisela	None	Àlex; Bustamante; Naím; Nuria	Bustamante; Gisela; Naím; Nuria	Bustamante; Gisela; Rosa; Verónica	Bustamante; Manu; Nuria; Verónica	None	Rosa; 26.6% to win
Saved by the teachers	Àlex	Gisela	Natalia	Naím	Manu	Nuria	Verónica	None	None	Bustamante	Gisela	Rosa	Manu	None	Rosa; 26.6% to win
Saved by the contestants	Javián; 5* of 13 votes to save	Alejandro; 6 of 12 votes to save	Alejandro; 5 of 11 votes to save	Natalia; 5 of 10 votes to save	Verónica; 3* of 9 votes to save	Alejandro; 6 of 8 votes to save	Bustamante; 3 of 7 votes to save	None	None	Nuria; 5 of 7 votes to save	Nuria; 4 of 6 votes to save	Bustamante; 2* of 5 votes to save	Verónica; 2 of 4 votes to save	None	Bisbal; 20.9% to win
Saved by public vote	None	Nuria; 76.0% to save	Juan; 60.1% to save	Juan; 54.5% to save	Juan; 50.3% to save	Alejandro; 52.7% to save	Verónica; 70.5% to save	Naím; 70.0% to save	Àlex; 41% to return	Àlex; 64.0% to return	Naím; 66.7% to save	Bustamante; 65.0% to save	Verónica; 53.8% to save	Bustamante; 54.2% to save	Bisbal; 20.9% to win
Saved by public vote	None	Nuria; 76.0% to save	Juan; 60.1% to save	Juan; 54.5% to save	Juan; 50.3% to save	Alejandro; 52.7% to save	Verónica; 70.5% to save	Naím; 70.0% to save	Juan; 16% to return	Àlex; 64.0% to return	Naím; 66.7% to save	Bustamante; 65.0% to save	Verónica; 53.8% to save	Bustamante; 54.2% to save	Bisbal; 20.9% to win
Evicted	None	Geno; 24.0% to save	Mireia; 39.9% to save	Javián; 45.5% to save	Àlex; 49.7% to save	Natalia; 47.3% to save	Juan; 29.5% to save	Alejandro; 30.0% to save	Alejandro; 15% to return	Juan; 36.0% to return	Àlex; 33.3% to save	Naím; 35.0% to save	Gisela; 46.2% to save	Nuria; 45.8% to save	Bustamante; 18.8% to win
Evicted	None	Geno; 24.0% to save	Mireia; 39.9% to save	Javián; 45.5% to save	Àlex; 49.7% to save	Natalia; 47.3% to save	Juan; 29.5% to save	Alejandro; 30.0% to save	Natalia; 11% to return	Juan; 36.0% to return	Àlex; 33.3% to save	Naím; 35.0% to save	Gisela; 46.2% to save	Nuria; 45.8% to save	Bustamante; 18.8% to win
Evicted	None	Geno; 24.0% to save	Mireia; 39.9% to save	Javián; 45.5% to save	Àlex; 49.7% to save	Natalia; 47.3% to save	Juan; 29.5% to save	Alejandro; 30.0% to save	Javián; 8% to return	Juan; 36.0% to return	Àlex; 33.3% to save	Naím; 35.0% to save	Gisela; 46.2% to save	Nuria; 45.8% to save	Chenoa; 17.6% to win
Evicted	None	Geno; 24.0% to save	Mireia; 39.9% to save	Javián; 45.5% to save	Àlex; 49.7% to save	Natalia; 47.3% to save	Juan; 29.5% to save	Alejandro; 30.0% to save	Mireia; 5% to return	Juan; 36.0% to return	Àlex; 33.3% to save	Naím; 35.0% to save	Gisela; 46.2% to save	Nuria; 45.8% to save	Manu; 14.7% to win
Evicted	None	Geno; 24.0% to save	Mireia; 39.9% to save	Javián; 45.5% to save	Àlex; 49.7% to save	Natalia; 47.3% to save	Juan; 29.5% to save	Alejandro; 30.0% to save	Geno; 4% to return	Juan; 36.0% to return	Àlex; 33.3% to save	Naím; 35.0% to save	Gisela; 46.2% to save	Nuria; 45.8% to save	Verónica; 1.4% to win

=== Gala 0 ===
Gala 0 – 22 October 2001
R/O	Song	Contestant
1	"No importa la distancia" by Ricky Martin	Bustamante
2	"De dónde soy" by Thalía	Mireia
3	"El amor que soñé" by Mariah Carey	Natalia
4	"Over My Shoulder by Mike and the Mechanics	Juan
5	"Pero me acuerdo de ti" by Christina Aguilera	Geno
6	"A puro dolor" by Son By Four	Álex
7	"Killing Me Softly with His Song" by Roberta Flack	Rosa
8	"La casa de Inés" by Guaraná	Bisbal
9	"She Bangs" by Ricky Martin	Javián
10	"Lía" by Ana Belén	Chenoa
11	"Si nos dejan" by Tamara	Nuria
12	"Isn't She Lovely" by Stevie Wonder	Naím
13	"One Moment In Time" by Whitney Houston	Verónica
14	"Man! I Feel Like a Woman!" by Shania Twain	Gisela
15	"Carolina" by M-Clan	Alejandro
16	"O tú o ninguna" by Luis Miguel	Manu
17	"Oh, Happy Day" by Edwin Hawkins Singers	Group performance with the teachers

=== Gala 1 ===
Gala 1 – 29 October 2001
R/O	Song	Contestant	Result
1	"Mira ven, ven" by Chayanne	Álex	Proposed by the jury Saved by the teachers
1	"Mira ven, ven" by Chayanne	Bisbal	Saved by the jury
1	"Mira ven, ven" by Chayanne	Javián	Proposed by the jury Saved by the contestants
2	"Gracias por la música" by ABBA	Rosa	Public's favourite
2	"Gracias por la música" by ABBA	Nuria	Proposed by the jury Nominated
3	"Tu verdad" by Mike and the Mechanics	Juan	Saved by the jury
3	"Tu verdad" by Mike and the Mechanics	Bustamante	Saved by the jury
4	"Déjame soñar" by Ramsey Ferrero	Gisela	Saved by the jury
4	"Déjame soñar" by Ramsey Ferrero	Natalia	Saved by the jury
4	"Déjame soñar" by Ramsey Ferrero	Mireia	Saved by the jury
5	"I Finally Found Someone" by Barbra Streisand and Bryan Adams	Naím	Saved by the jury
5	"I Finally Found Someone" by Barbra Streisand and Bryan Adams	Verónica	Saved by the jury
6	"Otro amor vendrá" by Lara Fabian	Geno	Proposed by the jury Nominated
6	"Otro amor vendrá" by Lara Fabian	Chenoa	Saved by the jury
7	"Cuando el amor se va" by Chayanne and Rubén Blades	Manu	Saved by the jury
7	"Cuando el amor se va" by Chayanne and Rubén Blades	Alejandro	Saved by the jury

=== Gala 2 ===
Gala 2 – 5 November 2001
R/O	Song	Contestant	Result
Up for eviction
1	"Una noche más" by Jennifer Lopez	Geno	Evicted by the public (24.0%)
2	"Esperaré" by Presuntos Implicados	Nuria	Saved by the public (76.0%) Saved by the jury
Regular performances
3	"Corazón espinado" by Carlos Santana and Maná	Álex	Saved by the jury
3	"Corazón espinado" by Carlos Santana and Maná	Bustamante	Saved by the jury
4	"Lady Marmalade" by Christina Aguilera, Lil' Kim, Mýa, and Pink	Verónica	Saved by the jury
4	"Lady Marmalade" by Christina Aguilera, Lil' Kim, Mýa, and Pink	Chenoa	Saved by the jury
4	"Lady Marmalade" by Christina Aguilera, Lil' Kim, Mýa, and Pink	Gisela	Proposed by the jury Saved by the teachers
5	"Adoro" by Armando Manzanero and Alejandro Sanz	Naím	Saved by the jury
5	"Adoro" by Armando Manzanero and Alejandro Sanz	Bisbal	Saved by the jury
6	"Nadie como tú" by Chayanne	Natalia	Saved by the jury
6	"Nadie como tú" by Chayanne	Mireia	Proposed by the jury Nominated
7	"Santo Santo" by Gloria Estefan and So Pra Contrariar	Manu	Saved by the jury
7	"Santo Santo" by Gloria Estefan and So Pra Contrariar	Rosa	Public's favourite
8	"It's Gonna Be Me" by 'N Sync	Juan	Proposed by the jury Nominated
8	"It's Gonna Be Me" by 'N Sync	Alejandro	Proposed by the jury Saved by the contestants
8	"It's Gonna Be Me" by 'N Sync	Javián	Saved by the jury
9	"Mi música es tu voz"	Group performance	
10	"Dile que la quiero" by David Civera	Group performance with David Civera	

=== Gala 3 ===
Gala 3 – 12 November 2001
R/O	Song	Contestant	Result
Up for eviction
1	"Por amor" by Thalía	Mireia	Evicted by the public (39.9%)
2	"Imagíname sin ti" by Luis Fonsi	Juan	Saved by the public (60.1%) Proposed by the jury Nominated
Regular performances
3	"El día que me quieras" by Luis Miguel	Bisbal	Saved by the jury
3	"El día que me quieras" by Luis Miguel	Nuria	Saved by the jury
4	"Mariana mambo" by Chayanne	Bustamante	Saved by the jury
4	"Mariana mambo" by Chayanne	Javián	Proposed by the jury Nominated
4	"Mariana mambo" by Chayanne	Álex	Saved by the jury
5	"Don't Let the Sun Go Down on Me" by Elton John and George Michael	Naím	Saved by the jury
5	"Don't Let the Sun Go Down on Me" by Elton John and George Michael	Alejandro	Proposed by the jury Saved by the contestants
6	"No me ames" by Marc Anthony and Jennifer Lopez	Manu	Saved by the jury
6	"No me ames" by Marc Anthony and Jennifer Lopez	Gisela	Saved by the jury
7	"Walking on Sunshine" by Katrina and the Waves	Verónica	Saved by the jury
7	"Walking on Sunshine" by Katrina and the Waves	Natalia	Proposed by the jury Saved by the teachers
8	"Sueña" by Luis Miguel	Chenoa	Saved by the jury
8	"Sueña" by Luis Miguel	Rosa	Public's favourite

=== Gala 4 ===
Gala 4 – 19 November 2001
R/O	Song	Contestant	Result
Up for eviction
1	"Your Song" by Elton John	Juan	Saved by the public (54.5%) Proposed by the jury Nominated
2	"La última noche" by Diego Torres	Javián	Evicted by the public (45.5%)
Regular performances
3	"Quiero vivir la vida amándote" by Jon Secada and Ana Gabriel	Bustamante	Saved by the jury
3	"Quiero vivir la vida amándote" by Jon Secada and Ana Gabriel	Verónica	Saved by the jury
4	"Suave" by Luis Miguel	Naím	Proposed by the jury Saved by the teachers
4	"Suave" by Luis Miguel	Alejandro	Saved by the jury
4	"Suave" by Luis Miguel	Bisbal	Saved by the jury
5	"Te extraño, te olvido, te amo" by Ricky Martin	Álex	Proposed by the jury Nominated
5	"Te extraño, te olvido, te amo" by Ricky Martin	Natalia	Proposed by the jury Saved by the contestants
6	"It's Raining Men" by Geri Halliwell	Rosa	Public's favourite
6	"It's Raining Men" by Geri Halliwell	Chenoa	Saved by the jury
6	"It's Raining Men" by Geri Halliwell	Gisela	Saved by the jury
7	"Noches de Bohemia" by Navajita Plateá	Manu	Saved by the jury
7	"Noches de Bohemia" by Navajita Plateá	Nuria	Saved by the jury
8	"El talismán" by Rosana	Group performance with Rosana	

=== Gala 5 ===
Gala 5 – 26 November 2001
R/O	Song	Contestant	Result
Up for eviction
1	"Atado a tu amor" by Chayanne	Juan	Saved by the public (50.3%) Saved by the jury
2	"Pisando fuerte" by Alejandro Sanz	Álex	Evicted by the public (49.7%)
Regular performances
3	"Guilty" by Barbra Streisand and Barry Gibb	Verónica	Proposed by the jury Saved by the contestants
3	"Guilty" by Barbra Streisand and Barry Gibb	Naím	Saved by the jury
4	"Vivir lo nuestro" by Marc Anthony and La India	Bisbal	Saved by the jury
4	"Vivir lo nuestro" by Marc Anthony and La India	Rosa	Public's favourite
5	"Fallen" by Randy Crawford and Sole Giménez	Chenoa	Saved by the jury
5	"Fallen" by Randy Crawford and Sole Giménez	Nuria	Saved by the jury
6	"Es por ti" by Cómplices	Alejandro	Proposed by the jury Nominated
6	"Es por ti" by Cómplices	Natalia	Proposed by the jury Nominated
6	"Es por ti" by Cómplices	Manu	Proposed by the jury Saved by the teachers
7	"Vivo por ella" by Andrea Bocelli and Marta Sánchez	Bustamante	Saved by the jury
7	"Vivo por ella" by Andrea Bocelli and Marta Sánchez	Gisela	Saved by the jury

=== Gala 6 ===
Gala 6 – 3 December 2001
R/O	Song	Contestant	Result
Up for eviction
1	"Héroe" by Mariah Carey	Natalia	Evicted by the public (47.3%)
2	"Quédate a dormir" by M-Clan	Alejandro	Saved by the public (52.7%) Proposed by the jury Saved by the contestants
Regular performances
3	"(Everything I Do) I Do It For You" by Bryan Adams	Naím	Saved by the jury
3	"(Everything I Do) I Do It For You" by Bryan Adams	Gisela	Saved by the jury
4	"Otra Vez (Qué pena de mi)" by Café Quijano and Olga Tañón	Juan	Proposed by the jury Nominated
4	"Otra Vez (Qué pena de mi)" by Café Quijano and Olga Tañón	Nuria	Proposed by the jury Saved by the teachers
5	"Lucía" by Joan Manuel Serrat	Manu	Saved by the jury
5	"Lucía" by Joan Manuel Serrat	Bisbal	Saved by the jury
6	"No More Tears (Enough Is Enough)" by Barbra Streisand and Donna Summer	Verónica	Proposed by the jury Nominated
6	"No More Tears (Enough Is Enough)" by Barbra Streisand and Donna Summer	Rosa	Public's favourite
7	"Te quiero, te quiero" by Nino Bravo and Paloma San Basilio	Bustamante	Saved by the jury
7	"Te quiero, te quiero" by Nino Bravo and Paloma San Basilio	Chenoa	Saved by the jury
8	"Here Comes the Sun" by George Harrison	Group performance	

=== Gala 7 ===
Gala 7 – 10 December 2001
R/O	Song	Contestant	Result
Up for eviction
1	"You'll Be in My Heart" by Phil Collins	Juan	Evicted by the public (29.5%)
2	"Nothing Compares 2 U" by Sinéad O'Connor	Verónica	Saved by the public (70.5%) Proposed by the jury Saved by the teachers
Regular performances
3	"Será que no me amas" by Luis Miguel	Alejandro	Proposed by the jury Nominated
3	"Será que no me amas" by Luis Miguel	Bustamante	Proposed by the jury Saved by the contestants
3	"Será que no me amas" by Luis Miguel	Manu	Saved by the jury
4	"Entre mis recuerdos" by Luz Casal	Nuria	Saved by the jury
5	"Nada cambiará mi amor por ti" by Glenn Medeiros	Naím	Proposed by the jury Nominated
5	"Nada cambiará mi amor por ti" by Glenn Medeiros	Bisbal	Public's favourite
6	"Somebody Else's Guy" by Jocelyn Brown	Chenoa	Saved by the jury
6	"Somebody Else's Guy" by Jocelyn Brown	Gisela	Saved by the jury
7	"Something" by Shirley Bassey	Rosa	Saved by the jury
8	"Mi música es tu voz"	Group performance by all contestants	

=== Gala 8 ===
Gala 8 – 17 December 2001
R/O	Song	Contestant	Result
Up for eviction
1	"Black Magic Woman" by Fleetwood Mac	Alejandro	Evicted by the public (30.0%)
2	"On Broadway" by George Benson	Naím	Saved by the public (70.0%) Saved by the jury
Regular performances
3	"Tengo que decirte algo" by Gloria Estefan and José Feliciano	Nuria	Saved by the jury
3	"Tengo que decirte algo" by Gloria Estefan and José Feliciano	Manu	Proposed by the jury Nominations suspended
4	"Azul" by Cristian Castro	Bustamante	Proposed by the jury Nominations suspended
5	"Aprendiz" by Malú	Chenoa	Saved by the jury
6	"Oye mi canto" by Gloria Estefan	Verónica	Proposed by the jury Nominations suspended
6	"Oye mi canto" by Gloria Estefan	Rosa	Public's favourite
6	"Oye mi canto" by Gloria Estefan	Gisela	Proposed by the jury Nominations suspended
7	"When a Man Loves a Woman" by Michael Bolton	Bisbal	Saved by the jury

Repechage – 17 December 2001
R/O	Song	Contestant	Result
1	"Átame a tu piel" by Susanna del Río	Geno	Candidate for repechage
2	"Hijo de la luna" by Mecano	Mireia	Candidate for repechage
3	"Vivir sin aire" by Maná	Javián	Candidate for repechage
4	"Me iré" by Alejandro Sanz	Álex	Candidate for repechage
5	"Can't Fight the Moonlight" by LeAnn Rimes	Natalia	Candidate for repechage
6	"Can You Feel the Love Tonight" by Elton John	Juan	Candidate for repechage
7	"Black Magic Woman" by Fleetwood Mac	Alejandro	Candidate for repechage

=== Christmas Gala ===
Repechage – 23 December 2001
R/O	Song	Contestant	Result
1	"Átame a tu piel" by Susanna del Río	Geno	Evicted by the public (4%)
2	"Déjame soñar" by Ramsey Ferrero	Mireia	Evicted by the public (5%)
3	"Vivir sin aire" by Maná	Javián	Evicted by the public (8%)
4	"Pisando fuerte" by Alejandro Sanz	Álex	Repechage finalist (41%)
5	"El amor que soñé" by Mariah Carey	Natalia	Evicted by the public (11%)
6	"Over My Shoulder by Mike and the Mechanics	Juan	Repechage finalist (16%)
7	"Carolina" by M-Clan	Alejandro	Evicted by the public (15%)

Christmas Gala – 23 December 2001
R/O	Song	Contestant
1	"Rosie Christmas" by Donna Summer	Geno
1	"Rosie Christmas" by Donna Summer	Chenoa
2	"Alegría, alegría" by Benjamín A. Estacio	Manu
3	"Last Christmas" by Wham!	Naím
3	"Last Christmas" by Wham!	Verónica
4	"En Navidad" by Rosana	Javián
4	"En Navidad" by Rosana	Álex
4	"En Navidad" by Rosana	Bustamante
5	"Un año más" by Mecano	Natalia
5	"Un año más" by Mecano	Mireia
6	"Angels" by Robbie Williams	Alejandro
6	"Angels" by Robbie Williams	Juan
7	"Mi estrella" by Arcos y Barroso	Bisbal
7	"Mi estrella" by Arcos y Barroso	Gisela
8	"Más allá" by Gloria Estefan	Nuria
8	"Más allá" by Gloria Estefan	Rosa
9	"Mi música es tu voz"	Group performance by all contestants

=== Gala 9 ===
Gala 9 – 7 January 2002
R/O	Song	Contestant	Result
Repechage
1	"Hello" by Lionel Richie	Juan	Evicted by the public (36.0%)
2	"Yo te voy a amar" by 'N Sync	Álex	Repechaged (64.0%) Proposed by the jury Nominated
Regular performances
3	"Nadie cómo tú" by Francisco Céspedes	Naím	Proposed by the jury Nominated
3	"Nadie cómo tú" by Francisco Céspedes	Nuria	Proposed by the jury Saved by the contestants
4	"Flashdance... What a Feeling" by Irene Cara	Gisela	Saved by the jury
5	"Alegría de vivir" by Ray Heredia	Manu	Saved by the jury
6	"Dímelo" by Marc Anthony	Bisbal	Public's favourite
6	"Dímelo" by Marc Anthony	Bustamante	Proposed by the jury Saved by the teachers
7	"Desde la oscuridad" by Gloria Estefan	Rosa	Saved by the jury
8	"Stop!" by Sam Brown	Verónica	Saved by the jury
8	"Stop!" by Sam Brown	Chenoa	Saved by the jury
9	"Qué bonito" by Rosario Flores	Group performance with Rosario Flores	

=== Gala 10 ===
Gala 10 – 14 January 2002
R/O	Song	Contestant	Result
Up for eviction
1	"Cuando acaba el placer" by Só Pra Contrariar	Álex	Evicted by the public (33.3%)
2	"Superstition" by Stevie Wonder	Naím	Saved by the public (66.7%) Proposed by the jury Nominated
Regular performances
3	"Y, ¿si fuera ella?" by Alejandro Sanz	Bisbal	Saved by the jury
4	"Refugio de amor" by Vanessa Williams and Chayanne	Bustamante	Proposed by the jury Nominated
4	"Refugio de amor" by Vanessa Williams and Chayanne	Gisela	Proposed by the jury Saved by the teachers
5	"Last Dance" by Donna Summer	Chenoa	Saved by the jury
6	"Take My Breath Away" by Berlin	Verónica	Saved by the jury
7	"Acuarela" by Toquinho	Nuria	Proposed by the jury Saved by the contestants
8	"Somos novios" by Armando Manzanero	Rosa	Public's favourite
8	"Somos novios" by Armando Manzanero	Manu	Saved by the jury
9	"Si nos dejan" by Tamara	Group performance with Tamara	

=== Gala 11 ===
Gala 11 – 21 January 2002
R/O	Song	Contestant	Result
Up for eviction
1	"Dance Little Sister" by Terence Trent D'Arby	Naím	Evicted by the public (35.0%)
2	"Amantes de ocasión" by Cristian Castro	Bustamante	Saved by the public (65.0%) Proposed by the jury Saved by the contestants
Regular performances
3	"I Have Nothing" by Whitney Houston	Rosa	Proposed by the jury Saved by the teachers
4	"No me importa nada" by Luz Casal	Nuria	Saved by the jury
5	"Escondidos" by Cristian Castro and Olga Tañon	Bisbal	Public's favourite
5	"Escondidos" by Cristian Castro and Olga Tañon	Chenoa	Saved by the jury
6	"Regresa a mí" by Toni Braxton	Verónica	Proposed by the jury Nominated
7	"Te extraño" by Armando Manzanero	Manu	Saved by the jury
8	"Don't Leave Me This Way" by Thelma Houston	Gisela	Proposed by the jury Nominated

=== Gala 12 ===
Gala 12 – 28 January 2002
R/O	Song	Contestant	Result
Up for eviction
1	"People" by Barbra Streisand	Verónica	Saved by the public (53.8%) Proposed by the jury Saved by the contestants 5th finalist
2	"All the Man That I Need" by Whitney Houston	Gisela	Evicted by the public (46.2%)
Regular performances
3	"Flor de Lis" by Ketama	Manu	Proposed by the jury Saved by the teachers 4th finalist
4	"Con los años que me quedan" by Gloria Estefan	Nuria	Proposed by the jury Nominated
5	"Hasta que el alma resista" by Chayanne	Bustamante	Proposed by the jury Nominated
6	"Ausencia" by Albinoni	Rosa	Public's favourite 1st finalist
7	"Quiero" by Luis Miguel	Bisbal	Saved by the jury 2nd finalist
8	"The Best" by Tina Turner	Chenoa	Saved by the jury 3rd finalist

=== Gala 13 ===
Gala 13 – 4 February 2002
R/O	Song	Contestant	Result
Up for eviction
1	"Es por amor" by Alexandre Pires	Bustamante	Saved by the public (54.2%) 6th finalist
2	"Si tú no estás" by Rosana	Nuria	Evicted by the public (45.8%)
Regular performances
3	"Maybe This Time" by Liza Minnelli	Chenoa	Finalist
4	"Vida loca" by Francisco Céspedes	Bisbal	Finalist
5	"Contigo aprendí" by Armando Manzanero	Manu	Finalist
6	"I Will Go with You" by Donna Summer	Rosa	Finalist
7	"Contigo en la distancia" by Christina Aguilera	Verónica	Finalist

Potpourri Gala 0 – 4 February 2002
R/O	Song	Contestant
1	"Lía" by Ana Belén	Chenoa
2	"La casa de Inés" by Guaraná	Bisbal
3	"O tú o ninguna" by Luis Miguel	Manu
4	"Killing Me Softly with His Song" by Roberta Flack	Rosa
5	"One Moment In Time" by Whitney Houston	Verónica
6	"No importa la distancia" by Ricky Martin	Bustamante

=== Final Gala ===
Final Gala – 11 February 2002
R/O	Song	Contestant	Result
1	"El hombre del piano" by Ana Belén	Chenoa	4th place (17.6%)
2	"Solo otra vez" by Eric Carmen	Bisbal	Runner-up (20.9%)
3	"Aquellas pequeñas cosas" by Joan Manuel Serrat	Manu	5th place (14.7%)
4	"Unchained Melody" by The Righteous Brothers	Rosa	Winner (26.6%)
5	"One Day I'll Fly Away" by Nicole Kidman	Verónica	6th place (1.4%)
6	"Perdóname" by Camilo Sesto	Bustamante	3rd place (18.8%)
7	"No dejes de soñar"	Academy teachers	
8	"Mi música es tu voz"	Group performance by all contestants	

=== Disney Gala ===
Disney Gala – 18 February 2002
R/O	Song	Contestant
1	"Quiero ser como tú" from The Jungle Book	Group performance by all contestants
2	"La Bella y la Bestia" from Beauty and the Beast	Chenoa
2	"La Bella y la Bestia" from Beauty and the Beast	Bisbal
3	"El ciclo de la vida" from The Lion King	Rosa
4	"No importa la distancia" from Hercules	Bustamante
5	"Bajo el mar" from The Little Mermaid	Geno
5	"Bajo el mar" from The Little Mermaid	Mireia
6	"Triunfará el amor" from The Lion King II: Simba's Pride	Natalia
6	"Triunfará el amor" from The Lion King II: Simba's Pride	Naím
7	"Hay un amigo en mí" from Toy Story	Manu
7	"Hay un amigo en mí" from Toy Story	Alejandro
8	"Un mundo ideal" from Aladdin	Bustamante
8	"Un mundo ideal" from Aladdin	Gisela
9	"Sueña" from The Hunchback of Notre Dame	Bisbal
10	"Parte de tu mundo" from The Little Mermaid	Verónica
10	"Parte de tu mundo" from The Little Mermaid	Nuria
11	"Busca lo más vital" from The Jungle Book	Álex
11	"Busca lo más vital" from The Jungle Book	Javián
12	"Si no te conociera" from Pocahontas	Juan
12	"Si no te conociera" from Pocahontas	Rosa
13	"Aquella estrella de allá" from Return to Never Land	Gisela
14	"Ay ho" from Snow White and the Seven Dwarfs	Academy teachers

== Ratings ==
The Operación Triunfo 1 galas were broadcast live on La Primera of Televisión Española in the Monday's prime-time slot, and on TVE Internacional. (Note: All the galas were held on Monday, except for the Christmas gala, which was held on Sunday.)

Operación Triunfo 1 – Ratings
Gala	Date	Avg. viewers (millions)	Avg. share
Gala 0	22 October 2001	2.734	22.1%
Gala 1	29 October 2001	2.780	23.0%
Gala 2	5 November 2001	4.905	33.3%
Gala 3	12 November 2001	5.112	33.6%
Gala 4	19 November 2001	5.857	38.1%
Gala 5	26 November 2001	6.006	38.5%
Gala 6	3 December 2001	6.471	41.3%
Gala 7	10 December 2001	6.767	42.5%
Gala 8	17 December 2001	6.943	44.8%
Christmas Gala	23 December 2001	6.970	50.8%
Gala 9	7 January 2002	7.756	47.9%
Gala 10	14 January 2002	7.578	47.2%
Gala 11	21 January 2002	8.888	54.0%
Gala 12	28 January 2002	9.528	56.7%
Gala 13	4 February 2002	10.017	59.8%
Final Gala	11 February 2002	12.873	68.0%
Disney Gala	18 February 2002	7.824	48.7%

== Official albums ==
Following each gala, Vale Music released a CD with the studio recordings made by the contestants of the songs they performed live at the gala. Each of these fourteen albums sold over 100,000 copies and achieved platinum certification.

On 11 December 2001, Vale Music released a double CD titled Operación Triunfo: Álbum featuring the studio recordings made by the contestants of the songs they would perform live at the Christmas gala, and a selection of songs from the galas up to that point. The album sold over 1.2 million copies and was certified twelve times platinum.

On 12 February 2002, Vale Music released another double CD titled Operación Triunfo canta Disney, featuring the studio recordings made by the contestants of the songs they would perform live at the Disney gala. The first CD includes Disney songs, and the second CD contains a selection of songs from the previous galas. In addition to those performed live at the Disney gala, the first CD also includes: "Mi príncipe vendrá" from Snow White and the Seven Dwarfs by Nuria; "No se que va a ser de mi" from Toy Story by Manu; "Colores en el viento" from Pocahontas by Verónica; "Hijo de hombre" from Tarzan by Naím; and "Reflejo" from Mulan by Chenoa. The album was the second best-selling album on the 2002 annual chart in Spain, selling over 700,000 copies and was certified seven times platinum.

On 12 March 2002, Vale Music in partnership with the Royal Spanish Football Federation, as a way of supporting the Spain national football team ahead of the 2002 FIFA World Cup, released a CD titled Operación Triunfo: El disco del deporte with new recordings made by the contestants of songs related to sporting events, which includes the original song "Vivimos la selección" which was the official song of the Spanish team for the event. The album sold over 50,000 copies and was certified gold.

On 3 September 2002, Vale Music released the live album titled Operación Triunfo 2002 en concierto recorded during the official tour.

== Official tour ==
Between 4 April and 4 June 2002, all contestants went on a joint concert tour throughout Spain, which was attended by more than half a million people. On 6 March, they performed the song "Vivimos la selección" at the Santiago Bernabéu Stadium in Madrid ahead the final match of the 2001–02 Copa del Rey football tournament; and were received by King Juan Carlos I, Queen Sofía, and Prince Felipe, who were attending the match, after the performance. The penultimate concert of the tour, held on 1 June at the Santiago Bernabéu Stadium was broadcast the following day on La Primera attracting 5.136 million viewers and a 39.5% share.

Date	Venue	Attendance (Aprox.)
4 April 2002	Pabellón Príncipe Felipe, Zaragoza	9 000
5 April 2002	La Ribera Bullring, Logroño	10 000
6 April 2002	Recinto Ferial, Torrelavega	20 000
8 April 2002	Palau Sant Jordi, Barcelona	54 000
10 April 2002	Palau Sant Jordi, Barcelona	54 000
11 April 2002	Palau Sant Jordi, Barcelona	54 000
12 April 2002	Illumbe Bullring, San Sebastián	9 000
13 April 2002	Fernando Buesa Arena, Vitoria-Gasteiz	8 500
19 April 2002	Coliseum da Coruña, La Coruña	9 500
20 April 2002	Multiusos Fontes do Sar, Santiago de Compostela	8 500
21 April 2002	León Arena, León	8 500
22 April 2002	La Glorieta Bullring, Salamanca	9 500
26 April 2002	Recinto Ferial, Santa Cruz de Tenerife	12 000
27 April 2002	Auditorio Parque San Juan, Telde	11 000
30 April 2002	Palacio Vistalegre, Madrid	13 000
3 May 2002	Valencia Bullring, Valencia	10 500
4 May 2002	Polideportivo Municipal, Elche	20 000
9 May 2002	Palacio de Deportes Martín Carpena, Málaga	20 000
10 May 2002	Recinto Ferial, Almería	19 000
11 May 2002	La Condomina Bullring, Murcia	10 000
15 May 2002	Son Moix Stadium, Palma de Mallorca	25 000
16 May 2002	Pabellón Municipal de Deportes, Granada	18 000
17 May 2002	La Cartuja Stadium, Seville	60 000
18 May 2002	Las Palomas Bullring, Algeciras	11 000
1 June 2002	Santiago Bernabéu Stadium, Madrid	60 000
4 June 2002	Auditorio Maestro Padilla, Almería	
