= Dile que la quiero =

2001 song by David Civera

Single by David Civera

from the album Dile que la quiero
- Language: Spanish
- Released: April 2001
- Genre: Latin pop
- Length: 3:06
- Label: Vale Music
- Songwriter: Alejandro Abad
- Producer: Alejandro Abad

David Civera singles chronology
"Dile que la quiero" (2001)	"Caminar por la vida" (2001)

Eurovision Song Contest 2001 entry
- Country: Spain
- Artist: David Civera
- Language: Spanish
- Composer: Alejandro Abad
- Lyricist: Alejandro Abad

Finals performance
- Final result: 6th
- Final points: 76

Entry chronology
- ◄ "Colgado de un sueño" (2000)
- "Europe's Living a Celebration" (2002) ►

"Dile que la quiero" (Spanish pronunciation: [ˈdile ke la ˈkjeɾo]; "Tell Her that I Love Her") is a song recorded by Spanish singer David Civera, written by Alejandro Abad. It represented Spain in the Eurovision Song Contest 2001, placing sixth.

== Background ==
=== Conception ===
The song was written by Alejandro Abad who had represented Spain at the 1994 contest with "Ella no es ella".

=== Eurovision ===
On 23 February 2001, "Dile que la quiero" performed by an unknown David Civera competed in the national final organized by Televisión Española (TVE) to select its song and performer for the 46th edition of the Eurovision Song Contest. The song won the competition so it became the Spanish entry, and Civera the performer, for Eurovision. For the song to participate in the contest, it was necessary to shorten its introduction to fit it into three minutes. TVE filmed a promo video with Civera singing the song on location in Seville that was distributed to the other participant broadcasters.

On 12 May 2001, the Eurovision Song Contest was held at the Parken Stadium in Copenhagen hosted by the Danish Broadcasting Corporation (DR), and broadcast live throughout the continent. Civera performed "Dile que la quiero" thirteenth on the night, following Ireland's "Without Your Love" by Gary O'Shaughnessy and preceding France's "Je n'ai que mon âme" by Natasha St-Pier. Because the suitcase with the outfit designed by Jean Paul Gaultier that Civera was going to wear was lost and never recovered, he had to wear the Zara outfit intended for rehearsals.

At the close of voting, it had received 76 points, placing sixth in a field of twenty-three. The song was succeeded as Spanish entry at the 2002 contest by "Europe's Living a Celebration" by Rosa. Spain did not surpass the sixth place of "Dile que la quiero" for the following twenty-one years, until "SloMo" placed third in 2022.

=== Aftermath ===
"Dile que la quiero" became a major hit in the summer of 2001 in Spain. The song is included in Civera's album of the same name –along with a remix version–, that reached number 9 in the album charts in Spain, and was certified platinum (100,000 copies).

== Chart history ==
Singles chart (2001)	Peak position
Spain (Promusicae)	2
Spain (Los 40)	1

== Legacy ==
=== Other performances ===
- David Civera performed the song in Gala Two of the first season of Operación Triunfo aired on 5 November 2001 on La 1 of Televisión Española in a group performance with the season's contestants. (Note: Rosa, David Bisbal, David Bustamante, Chenoa, Manu Tenorio, Verónica Romero, Nuria Fergó, Gisela, Naím Thomas, Àlex Casademunt, Alejandro Parreño, Juan Camus, Natalia, Javián, Mireia Montávez, and Geno Machado.) The studio version of this performance is included in the Operación Triunfo: Álbum that reached number 1 in the album charts in Spain and was certified 12× platinum.

=== Impersonations ===
- In the seventh episode of the sixth season of Tu cara me suena aired on 10 November 2017 on Antena 3, Pepa Aniorte impersonated David Civera singing "Dile que la quiero" –and singing in duo with him– replicating his performance at Eurovision.
