= Gente de Primera =

- Created by: TVE
- Country of origin: Spain
- Original language: Spanish

Production
- Running time: 90 minutes

Original release
- Release: 2005 – 2005

Gente de Primera is a Spanish television singing competition on TVE where aspiring popstars compete for a record deal, each backed by a popular popstar as a mentor. The first series in 2005 was won by Yanira Figueroa who was backed by Rosa López, and the runner-up was Verónica Rojas, backed by Bertín Osborne. The second series was won by Nauzet who was backed by Natalia, while the runner-up was Mirela who was backed by Pastora Soler. Other popular singers who participated as mentors in the show were Chenoa or Marta Sánchez, among others.
