= Nada Es Lo Que Crees =

Studio album by Natalia
- Released: 2006
- Label: Vale
- Producer: Da Bruk

Natalia chronology
Natalia (2004)	Nada Es Lo Que Crees (2006)	Radikal (2007)

Nada Es Lo Que Crees is the fourth album by Spanish singer Natalia. It features the singles: "Loco Por Mí", "A Ti", and "No Fui Yo". It crept up to number 24 in the Spanish charts, and "Loco Por Mi" reached number one in the Spanish charts on download sales alone.

== Track listing ==
No.	Title	Writer(s)	Length
1.	"Intro Loco"	David Augustave, Bruno Nicolás, Kiko Rodríguez	0:56
2.	"Loco Por Mí"	Augustave, Nicolás, Rodríguez	2:47
3.	"Nada Es Lo Que Crees"	Augustave, Nicolás, Rodríguez	3:31
4.	"De Repente" (Unexpected)	Tina Harris, Steve Lee, Pete Martin, Augustave, Nicolás, Rodríguez (adaptation)	3:39
5.	"No Fui Yo" (Let's Get Wild)	Douglas Carr, Vince Degiorgio, Kasper Lindgren, Joakim Udd, Augustave, Nicolás, Rodríguez (adaptation)	3:13
6.	"Baila En Mi Fuego" (Dance In The Fire)	Marcus Englöf, Mimmi Waermö, Samuel Waermö, Felipe Pedroso (adaptation)	3:03
7.	"Último Adiós" (Last Goodbye)	Alan Bremner, Julie Thompson, Augustave, Nicolás, Rodríguez (adaptation)	3:37
8.	"Por Ti" (Call Me)	Colin Emmanuel, Celetia Martin, Alan Simpson, Augustave, Nicolás, Rodríguez (adaptation)	3:05
9.	"Estrella De Una Noche" (Showgirl)	Jakob Ringbom, Jörgen Ringqvist, Augustave, Nicolás, Rodríguez (adaptation)	3:10
10.	"A Ti" (Leave No Heart Behind)	Klaus Derendorf, Mattias Lindblom, Tom Nichols, Anders Wollbeck, Natalia Rodríguez (adaptation)	3:55
11.	"Yo Y Luego Tú"	Natalia Rodríguez	2:55
12.	"Soledad"	Natalia Rodríguez	3:53

== Personnel ==
- Natalia - lead and backing vocals
- Da Bruk - production, arrangement, programmations, backing vocals
- Alicia Arguiñano - backing vocals
- Miguel Antelo - backing vocals
- David Augustave - backing vocals
- Nalaya - backing vocals
- Norykko - backing vocals
- Dany Reus - backing vocals and backing vocals direction
- Gregory Carrero - guitar
- Ernesto Teruel - bass
- Raúl Gama - Hammond organ, clavichord, piano, string arrangement
- Bruno Nicolás - producer, recording
- Kiko Rodríguez - producer, recording
- Felipe Guevara - mixing
- Soren Elonsson - mastering
- Rubendario - photography
- Francesc Freixes - graphic design
