= Naím Thomas =

Spanish singer and actor (born 1980)

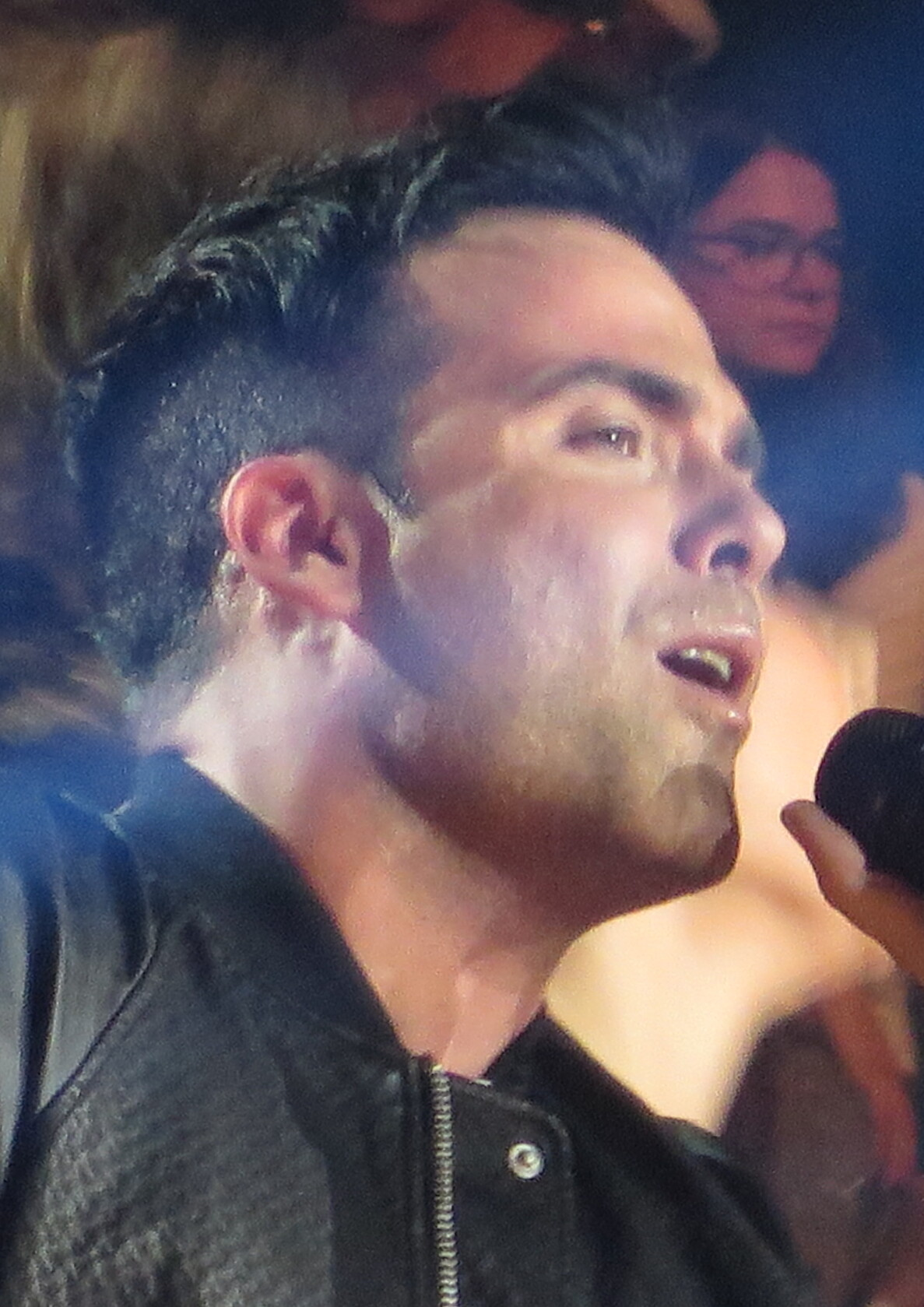
- Performance of Naím Thomas in the commemoration concert of the 15th anniversary of OT in the Palau Sant Jordi of Barcelona (31 October 2016)

Background information
- Born: Naím Thomas Mansilla; 16 October 1980 (age 45)
- Origin: Premià de Mar (Barcelona), Spain
- Genres: Pop; funk
- Occupations: Singer; actor
- Instruments: Vocals; piano
- Years active: 2001–present
- Labels: Vale Music (2002–2005); Big Moon (2006–2008)

Naím Thomas Mansilla (born 16 October 1980 in Premià de Mar, Barcelona) is a Spanish singer and actor. He rose to fame by taking part in the first-ever series of Operación Triunfo (2001–2002). In addition to a musical career, he has appeared in a number of films, theatre works and musicals.

== Career ==
Son of Juan Thomas, and Patricia Mansilla, singers from Santa Cruz de Tenerife, Spain, he started studying music at age 6 and took part in a number of films and television series before applying for Operación Triunfo. Although he did not win the competition, he successfully released 3 albums.

He then moved to Los Angeles and he was cast in a major role in Desert of Blood, directed by Don Henry in 2006, and then in Sing Out in 2008.

After returning to Spain, he has released 909 nainonain with a style mixing funk, international pop, Latin music, rap and reggaeton. Its first single was " Funkmenco", it is a test of this musical fusion.

In July 2007 he became a presenter of the television program "Plaza Mayor" on Madrid's Onda 6.

On 23 September 2016, he married Colombian painter Dahianha Mendoza in a village near Puerto del Rosario.

== Awards ==
- 2008: Nominated for Revelation in a major musical for El Rey De Bodas during 6th edition of "Premios Chivas Telón".
- 2008: Nominated as best actor for El Rey De Bodas during "Premios Gran Vía".

== Discography ==
- Grandes Éxitos (Edición Especial) (2002)

Tracks

1. I Finally Found Someone (with Verónica Romeo)
2. Adoro (with David Bisbal)
3. Don't Let the Sun Go Down on Me (with Alejandro Parreño)
4. Suave (with David Bisbal and Alejandro Parreño)
5. Guilty (with Verónica Romeo)
6. Everything I Do, I Do It For You (with Gisela Lladó)
7. Nada Cambiará mi Amor por Ti (with David Bisbal)
8. On Broadway
9. Nadie como Tú (with Nuria Fergó)
10. Superstition
11. Dance Little Sister
12. Last Christmas (with Verónica Romeo) (Bonus Track)
13. Triunfará el Amor (with Natalia) (Bonus Track)
14. Hijo de Hombre (Bonus Track)
- No tengo prisa (Vale Music, 2002)

Selling 130,000 CDs venidos and going platinum.

Tracks

1. Cruel to Be Kind
2. Te Seguiría Buscando (Still Be Looking For You)
3. Estoy Enloqueciendo (Driving Me Crazy)
4. Ángeles
5. Con tu Amor
6. Para Siempre (Dreambaby)
7. Tú Volverás (Love Comes Along)
8. No Tengo Prisa
9. Arderé por ti (Only Love Remains)
10. Sólo Tú (Shame On You)
11. Ven a Funky Street (Funky Street)
12. Someone To Love
- Con sólo una palabra...(Vale Music, 2003)

Selling 50,000 CDs and going gold.

Tracks

1. Una Noche
2. Caliente
3. Haz lo que Quieras
4. Me Puedes Jurar
5. Se Rompe el Corazón
6. Aprendiendo a Descubrir
7. Camino de Rosas
8. Con Sólo una Palabra Tuya
9. En el Lío
10. Cuando me Pregunten
11. Vas a Entender
- 909 (Nainonain) (Big Moon Records, 2007)

Tracks:

1. Funkmenco
2. Te lo Voy a Dar
3. La Amé Otra Vez
4. Kee Joe
5. Estoy de Moda
6. Lo que Quiero Decir (Interlude)
7. Me Muero por Verte
8. Living In Madrid
9. Conga
10. It's Over
11. Soy Igual que Tú
12. Me Miró
13. Es Todo "It's Over" (Spanish Version) (Bonus Track)
14. Funkmenco (Progressive Remix) (Bonus Track)

== Filmography ==
Year	Title	Role	Notes
1993	Intruso	Ángel niño	
1996	Aquí llega Condemor	Chico	
1996	Pesadilla para un rico	Juanma	
1996	Muerte en Granada	Young Ricardo	aka 'Death in Granada'
1997	Gracias por la propina	Pepín adolescent	aka 'Thanks for the Tip '
1997	Caricias	Nen	
2000	Salsa	Stéphane	
2002	Food of Love	Teddy	aka 'Manjar de amor'
2003	The Tulse Luper Suitcases (Part 1: The Moab Story)	Hercule	Tales by Peter Greenaway
2005	Cry of the Winged Serpent	Pablo	aka 'El encantador de serpientes', (Short film)
2008	Desert of Blood	Cris	
2008	Sing out		

=== Short films ===
- Solo en La Buhardilla
- El Encantador de Serpientes

== Theatre ==
- Un Día (Mirall trencat)
- La del manojo de Rosas (Villa de Madrid Cultural Center)
- Las bicicletas son para el verano (Teatro principal of Málaga)
- El espejo rojo (Greg Barcelona)

Musicals

- 2007/2008: El rey de bodas
- 2008/2009: 1973 The Millenium Musical
- 2012: Edgar, El escritor de sombras (TV)
