= Europe's Living a Celebration =

2002 song by Rosa

Single by Rosa

from the album Rosa
- Language: Spanish
- Released: 13 March 2002
- Genre: Latin pop
- Length: 2:53
- Label: Vale Music
- Composer: Toni Ten
- Lyricist: Xasqui Ten
- Producers: Toni Ten; Xasqui Ten

Rosa singles chronology
"Europe's Living a Celebration" (2002)	"A solas con mi corazón" (2002)

Eurovision Song Contest 2002 entry
- Country: Spain
- Artist: Rosa López
- As: Rosa
- Language: Spanish
- Composer: Toni Ten
- Lyricist: Xasqui Ten

Finals performance
- Final result: 7th
- Final points: 81

Entry chronology
- ◄ "Dile que la quiero" (2001)
- "Dime" (2003) ►

Official performance video
- "Europe's Living a Celebration" on YouTube

"Europe's Living a Celebration" is a song recorded by Spanish singer Rosa, with music composed by Toni Ten and lyrics written by Xasqui Ten. It represented Spain in the Eurovision Song Contest 2002, placing seventh.

== Background ==
=== Conception ===
"Europe's Living a Celebration" was composed by Toni Ten with lyrics by Xasqui Ten. Despite the English-language title, the lyrics are in Spanish, with the exception of one verse of the chorus.

=== Eurovision ===
Between 25 February and 11 March 2002, Televisión Española (TVE) produced a national final to select its song and performer for the 47th edition of the Eurovision Song Contest in which the top three finishers –Rosa, David Bisbal, and David Bustamante– from the first season of Operación Triunfo competed with three songs each. "Europe's Living a Celebration" won the competition so it became the Spanish entry, and Rosa the performer, for Eurovision.

On 25 May 2002, the Eurovision Song Contest was held at the Saku Suurhall in Tallinn hosted by Eesti Televisioon (ETV), and broadcast live throughout the continent. In the introduction of the show, the hosts connected live via satellite –among others– to the Municipal Sports Palace of Granada –Rosa's hometown–, which was packed with a large audience cheering her on. (Note: TVE broadcast from there a pre- and post-Eurovision show to support Rosa, and the public there was watching the contest on a big screen.) Rosa performed "Europe's Living a Celebration" fifth on the night –accompanied by Bisbal, Bustamante, Chenoa, Gisela, and Geno as backing singers–, preceded by Greece's "S.A.G.A.P.O." by Michalis Rakintzis, and followed by Croatia's "Everything I Want" by Vesna Pisarović.

At the close of voting, it had received 81 points, placing seventh in a field of twenty-four. The voting sequence was followed in Spain by an average of 14.38 million viewers, which represented an 86.2% share, becoming the most watched space in the country of the entire decade. The entire show, with an average of 12.7 million viewers and an 80.4% share, is the most watched Eurovision in Spain since reliable audience measurements began to be made in 1992. The song was succeeded as Spanish entry at the 2003 contest by "Dime" by Beth.

=== Aftermath ===
Between 4 April and 4 June 2002, Rosa along with all the Operación Triunfo participants went on tour, giving twenty-eight concerts throughout Spain attended by more than half a million people, in which she sang "Europe's Living a Celebration" as one of the main numbers. The concert on 1 June in the Santiago Bernabéu Stadium in Madrid before more than sixty thousand people was broadcast nationwide by TVE the following day. "Europe's Living a Celebration" became a major hit in the summer of 2002 in Spain. The documentary film OT: la película, summarizing the lives of the participants during the tour, opened on 20 September in more than 300 movie theaters, and premiered on TVE on 30 December.

On 31 March 2015, Rosa performed the song in the Eurovision sixtieth anniversary show Eurovision Song Contest's Greatest Hits held in London. (Note: She performed "Europe's Living a Celebration" in a medley with other three Spanish entries: "La, la, la", "Vivo cantando", and "Eres tú".) On 31 October 2016, Rosa performed the song –accompanied again by Bisbal, Bustamante, Chenoa, Gisela, and Geno as backing singers– in the OT: El reencuentro anniversary concert held in the Palau Sant Jordi in Barcelona, and broadcast live nationwide by TVE.

== Chart history ==
The album Operación Triunfo: Eurovisión that included the studio versions of the nine songs of the national final, released on 22 February 2002 in Spain, was certified platinum (100,000 copies). The album Operación Triunfo: Gala Eurovisión that included the live versions of the nine songs recorded in the national final, released on 26 February 2002, was certified 4× platinum. "Europe's Living a Celebration" was also included in Rosa's first studio album Rosa was certified 5× platinum.

Chart (2002)	Peak position
Spain (Los 40)	1

== Legacy ==
=== Other performances ===
- María Isabel performed the song in the show Europasión, aired on La 1 of Televisión Española on 21 May 2008 to choose by popular vote the best song that Spain has sent to Eurovision.

=== Impersonations ===
- In the ninth episode of the second season of Tu cara me suena aired on 26 November 2012 on Antena 3, Daniel Diges impersonated Rosa singing "Europe's Living a Celebration" replicating her performance at Eurovision.
