= M Clan =

Spanish rock band

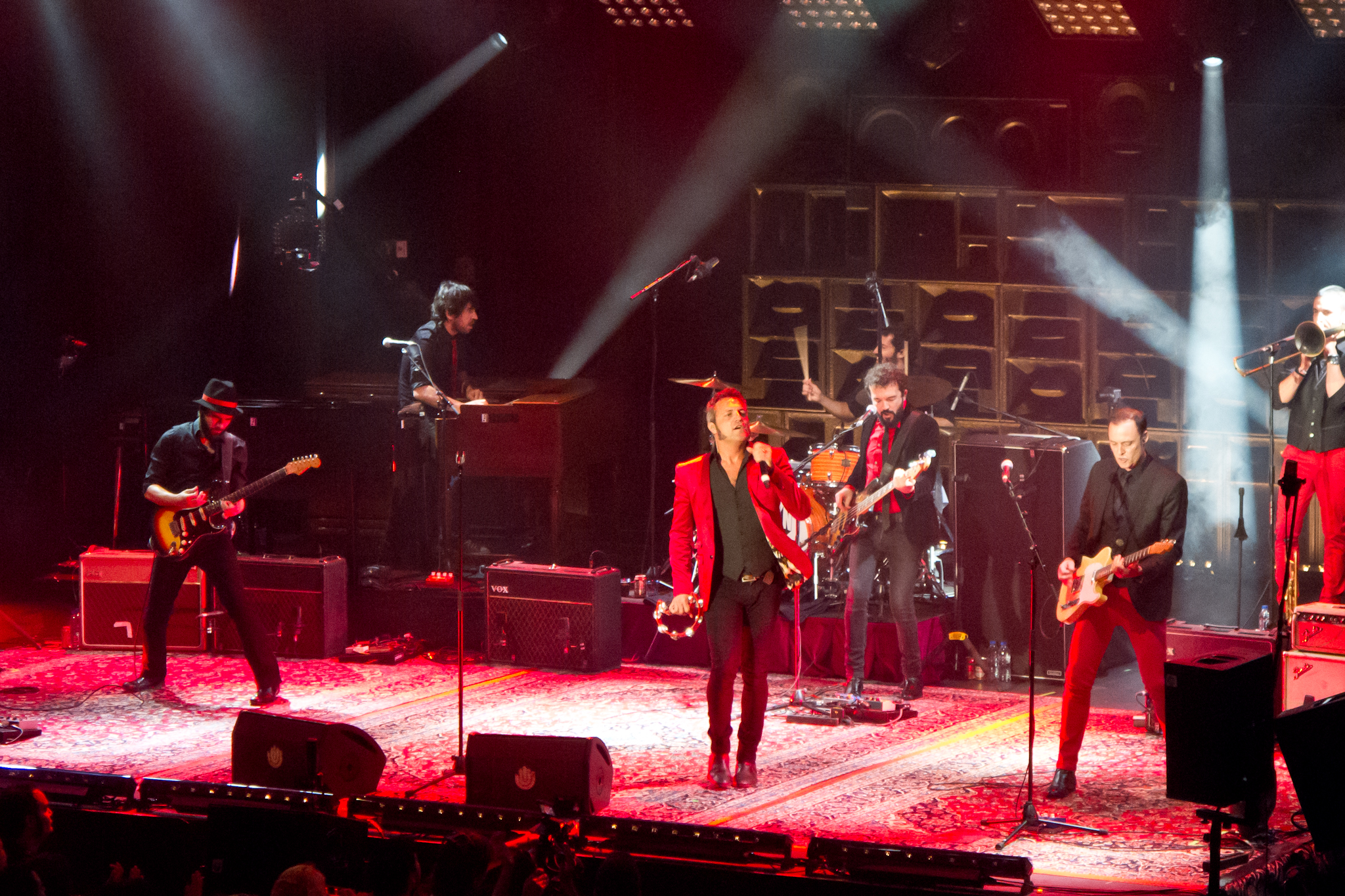
M Clan 20th anniversary concert in Madrid.

M Clan is a Spanish rock band. The band, initially named Murciélagos Clan, was formed in Murcia, (Spain) in 1992 by Carlos Tarque and Ricardo Ruipérez.

In March 1993 the band added Santiago Campillo, Pascual Saura, Juan Otero and Íñigo Uribe, under the name 'El clan de los murciélagos', (The Clan of Bats), which soon became 'M-Clan'. The band's sound was heavily influenced by Southern rock artists. The group currently consists of Carlos Tarque (vocals), Juan Antonio Otero, Ricardo Ruipérez (guitar), Carlos Raya (guitar), Pascual Saura, and Alejandro Climent 'Boli' (keyboard).

The band's 1999 release Usar y tirar went platinum, leading to the release of their 2001 Unplugged album Sin enchufe. The band released Sopa fría in 2004 under Warner Bros. and Eastwest Records.

== Discography ==
- Un buen momento (1995)
- Coliseum (1997)
- Usar y tirar (1999)
- Sin enchufe (Unplugged) (2001)
- Defectos personales (2002)
- Sopa fría (2004)
- Retrovisión (1995-2006)
- Memorias de un espantapájaros (2008)
- Para no ver el final (2010)
- Arenas movedizas (2012)
- Dos noches en el Price (2014)
- Delta (2016)
