= Alejandro Abad =

Chilean-born Spanish singer

- Born: Alejandro Antonio García Abad; 22 September 1962 (age 63); Santiago, Chile
- Occupation: singer-songwriter

Alejandro Antonio García Abad (born 22 September 1962 in Santiago, Chile), better known as Alejandro Abad, is a Chilean-born Spanish singer-songwriter and music producer. As a singer-songwriter, he represented Spain at the Eurovision Song Contest 1994 with "Ella no es ella". As a songwriter he has won the OTI Festival for Spain twice: in 1993 with "Enamorarse" and in 1995 with "Eres mi debilidad".

== Biography ==
During the second half of the 1980s, Alejandro Abad released three albums in Spain: Quédate con él, Buscando tu destino and Confidencias, the latter with label PolyGram. Later on, he composed songs for several Spanish artists, including his friend Dyango.

Dyango entrusted Abad with the musical career of his son Marcos Llunas, whose first album was composed by Abad. Several songs from this album such as "Reconquistarte", "Hay algo en ti" or "Vale la pena" became hits in Latin America. He composed the winning song of the OTI Festival 1993 "Enamorarse", sung by Ana Reverte representing Spain.

In 1994, he was internally chosen by Televisión Española (TVE) to represent Spain as a solo artist at the 39th Eurovision Song Contest in Dublin with the self-penned song "Ella no es ella", and he recorded an homonym album, his fourth, with label Horus.

In 1995, he won the OTI Festival 1995 again as a songwriter with the song "Eres mi debilidad", sung by Marcos Llunas.

Abad was invited to several Latin American countries to act as a jury member in international events. In 2000, he contributed with several songs to Raúl's album Sueño su boca, of which 600,000 copies were sold in Spain. He also participated in the production of Paulina Rubio's album Lo haré por ti, of which three million copies were sold worldwide.

The same year he discovered David Civera in the TV show Lluvia de estrellas; in 2001 Civera won the Spanish national final for the Eurovision Song Contest 2001 with a song penned by Abad, "Dile que la quiero". The song finished sixth in the ranking in Copenhagen. In 2001 Abad, together with Susana Saura, founded a new company, Garsa Music, to manage David Civera's career. Abad has produced six albums for Civera. Also in 2001 he produced the song "Mi música es tu voz" for the contestants of talent show Operación Triunfo.

In 2003 he produced the song "Desde el cielo" for Sergio, a song that finished in second place in the Junior Eurovision Song Contest 2003. In 2004 he produced the first album of the winner of the third series of Operación Triunfo, Vicente Seguí. He also composed the first single ("Sin Medida") of the winner of the fifth edition, Lorena, and has acted as a jury member of the contest.

In January 2017, Abad entered the reality show Gran Hermano VIP 5, the fifth season of the Spanish version of Celebrity Big Brother.

Preceded by Eva Santamaría with "Hombres"	Spain in the Eurovision Song Contest; 1994	Succeeded by Anabel Conde with "Vuelve conmigo"
