= Aquarela (song) =

Single by Toquinho

from the album Aquarela
- Released: 1983
- Genre: MPB
- Length: 4:16
- Label: Ariola
- Lyricists: Guido Morra, Maurizio Fabrizio, Toquinho, Vinicius de Moraes

Music video
- "Aquarela" on YouTube

"Aquarela" (Also known in Italy as Acquarello) is a song recorded by the Brazilian singer Toquinho. The song was originally written in italian by Guido Morra and recorded with the name as Acquarello in 1983, in italy. The success was immediate both in European and in Brazil (after a Portuguese version was released), becoming a classic of Brazilian music and being featuring in a Faber Castell ad. An animated music video of the song win the "Liv Ullmann Peace Prize" in 2003, an award of the oldest festival of children films in the world, The Chicago International Children's Film Festival. In July 2021, the Escritório Central de Arrecadação e Distribuição (ECAD) publicize that "Aquarela" was the most played song by Toquinho in the last five years.

== Background and release ==
The song begin as a song called Uma Rosa em Minha Mão, The theme song of the character chica of the soap opera of the 70s Fogo sobre Terra, composed by Toquinho and recorded by Marilia Barbosa, that have a similar melody to the song.

In the beginning of the 1980s, Toquinho begin to collaborate with an Italy composer called Maurizio Fabrizio that traveled to Brazil in 1982, and during a conversation, Maurizio Frabrizio show some composition to Toquinho, but the first composition was so well received by Toquinho, that Maurício return to italy to created the lyrics of the song with Guido Morra and when Toquinho travel to Italy, he heard for the first time the lyrics of the song and like so munch that he agreed to record the song.

The original version of the song became a big success in Italy and in Europe and made Toquinho the first Brazilian musician to achieve an Italian gold record, making Toquinho to record a Brazilian version of the song that became the most famous version of the song by the Brazilian public.

== Weekly charts ==
Weekly chart performance for "Aquarela"
Chart (1983)	Peak position
Europe (Eurochart Hot 100)	39
Italy (Musica e Dischi)	8
Spain (AFYVE)	3
