= Àlex Casademunt =

Spanish singer, actor, and television personality (1981–2021)

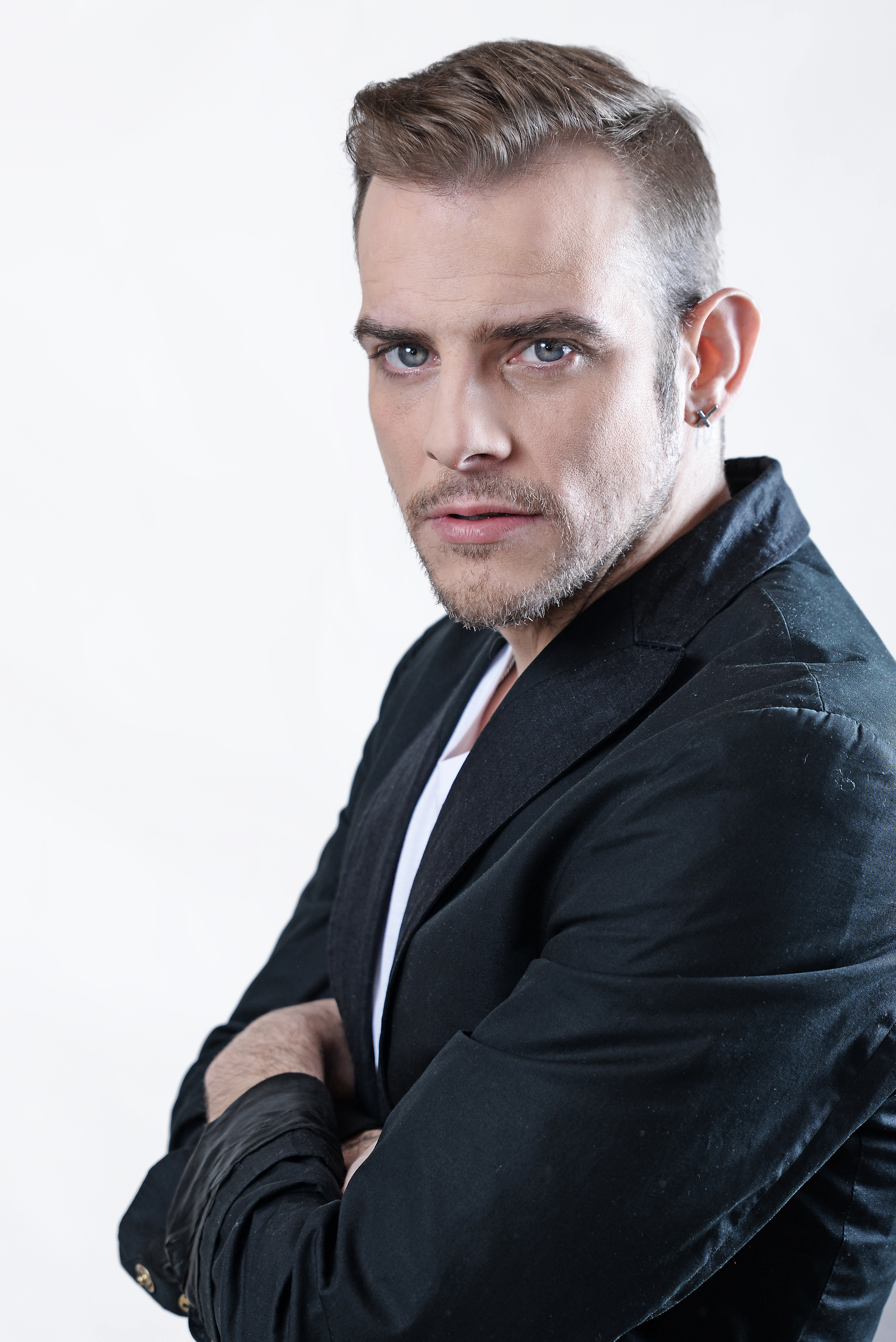
- Casademunt in 2017

Background information
- Born: Alejandro Casademunt González; 30 June 1981; Vilassar de Mar, Barcelona, Spain
- Died: 2 March 2021 (aged 39) Mataró, Barcelona, Spain
- Genres: Pop music
- Instrument: Vocals

Alejandro "Àlex" Casademunt González (30 June 1981 – 2 March 2021) was a Spanish pop singer, actor, and TV presenter. He entered the music industry after finishing in tenth place in the musical contest Operación Triunfo 2001.

== Biography ==
=== 2001–2005: Operación Triunfo 2001, Fórmula abierta and Inquietudes ===
While Casademunt was working as appliance technician, in 2001 he saw an advertisement and decided to attend the casting for the new music contest Operación Triunfo, broadcast by Televisión Española, and was accepted. He was eliminated and but then returned and finished tenth in the competition. After the competition, Casademunt formed the musical group "Fórmula Abierta" along with Geno Machado, Javián and Mireia Montávez, all of them also former contestants on the program. Together they recorded the album Aún hay más published on 7 June 2002, which included the song "Te quiero más", the biggest hit of the group. The singer David Bustamante, who was also a partner in the competition, asked Casademunt in 2002 to collaborate on the song "Dos hombres y un destino" ("Two men and one destiny") which became especially successful.

In 2003, Casademunt began a solo career as a singer, launching his first album Inquietudes de ella on 16 June. The album contained 14 songs (five of which he composed). For his preparation, Casademunt counted on the help of his brother Joan in the composition of some songs. The first introduction single was the romantic song "Jugándome la vida entera".

Between 2003 and 2004, Casademunt began his career as a television presenter on the children's program Los Lunnis of TVE.

Casademunt was an actor in OT: the film by Jaume Balagueró and Paco Plaza in 2002, the musical Peter Pan: the musical and the television series by Miramón Mendi La sopa boba for Antena 3 in 2004. He worked in television in other programs such as Crónicas marcianas of Telecinco and ¡Mira quién baila! on TVE in 2005, in which he participated as a contestant. Also in 2005, Casademunt presented María Isabel concerts.

=== 2006–2010: Work in TV ===
In 2006, Casademunt presented various television spaces. He was the host of the musical program "Fan Factory" (on UrbeTv of the Vocento Group) and was a collaborator of Hoy por ti by Telemadrid.

During the summer of 2006, Casademunt presented the karaoke Cantamania contest on TV3 together with the singer Roser from "Popstars" and in the fall of 2006 he was the host of the program El chat de Operación Triunfo in its fifth edition, at the academy. In this same year Casademunt worked for TV3 in "Mar de fons", playing the role of Marley. The following year, he worked in Telecinco on the morning show El programa de Ana Rosa. In it he acted as a commentator about TV programs.

Casademunt returned to acting working for the series Arrayán broadcast by Canal Sur in 2008, in which he played the character of Don Pablo. In 2009 he participated as the main character in the short film Ya te vale directed by Martín Crespo and produced by Rossmartin Films PC.

In September 2010, Casademunt returned to musical theater in Madrid with the hit Mamma Mia: el musical, in which he played the role of Sky, the protagonist's boyfriend.

=== 2011–2021: Casademunts and new singles ===
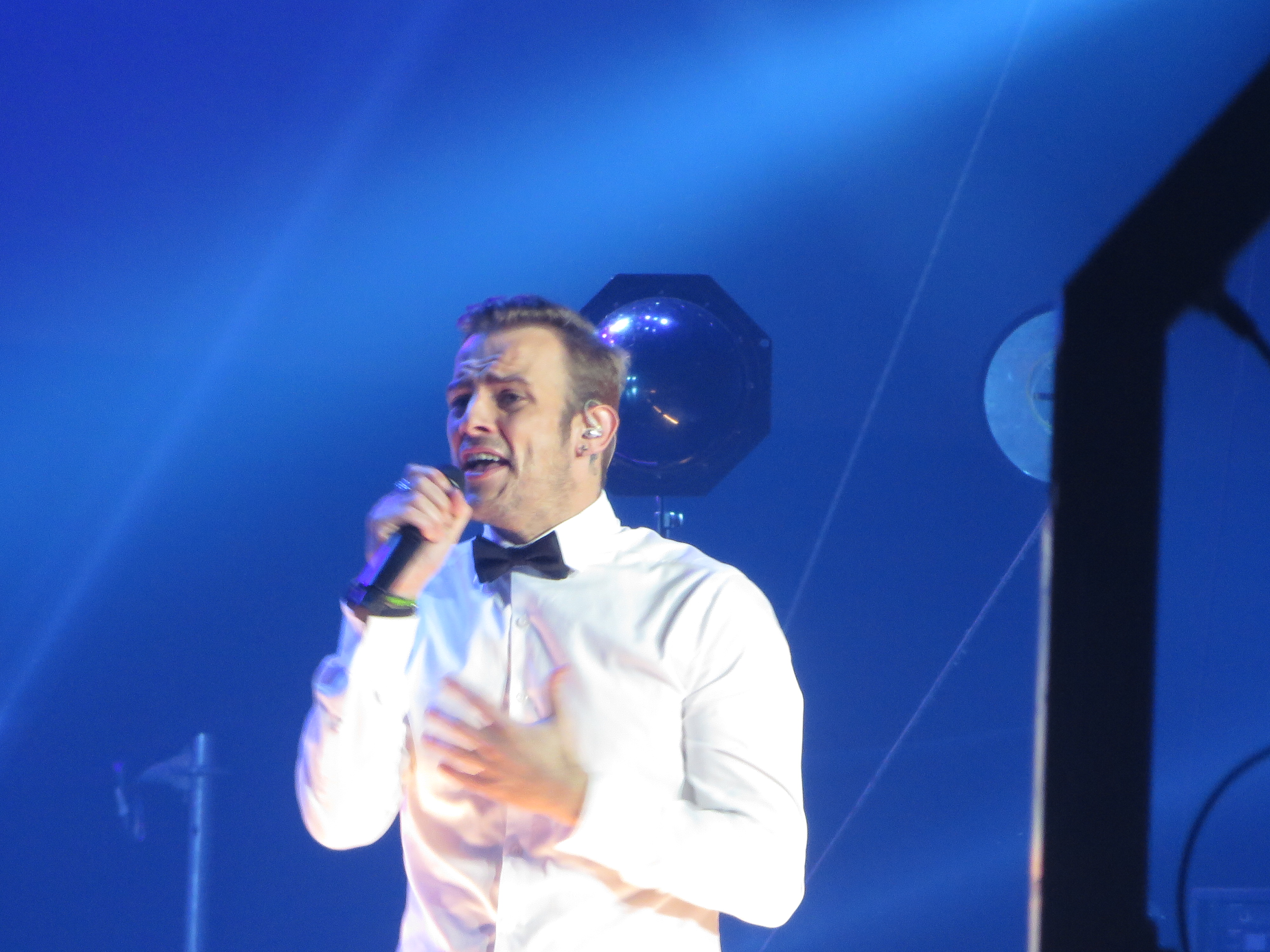
Casademunt in "Concierto de OT: el Reencuentro" on 31 October 2016.

In 2011, Casademunt joined 13 TV to host with Alejandra Andreu Noche Sensacional, one of the channel's main bets. In 2013 he came back to music working with his brother Joan Casademunt in the "Casademunts" group which they promoted on different television networks. In 2013, Casademunt participated as a contestant on the reality show space of Cuatro Expedition Impossible. In the spring of 2013 he presented "Sé", a single with his brother Joan Casademunt and in autumn he appeared in an episode of the Antena 3 Vive cantando. In that year Casademunt also participated in the Antena 3 program Your Face Sounds Familiar.

In 2014, Casademunt presented "Me haces sentir" with his brother and singer-producer Papa Joe. The song was released by Warner Music and Doble Music Records. In theater, he appeared in the plays Things of trios (2014) and The other side of the bed (2015).

Casademunt collaborated in the program Trencadís in 2015 in 8tv with Sandra Barneda. As of 2016, he collaborated with the program "Hora punta", presented by Javier Cárdenas to TVE, and returned to the sceneries again with "Fórmula Abierta".

On 31 October 2016, the OT Concert: The Reunion ("Concierto de OT: el Reencuentro") was celebrated in Palau Sant Jordi, Barcelona, where the competitors from the first season of Operación Triunf participated, including Casademunt. The concert was broadcast on TV, reaching a maximum of 4.7 million viewers.

== Personal life and death ==
In 2011 he was sentenced to a suspended sentence of nine months in prison for assaulting another young man in a nightclub. On 24 February 2014, Casademunt and his then-girlfriend Lucía Sánchez were arrested for attacking each other, both being released without charge shortly thereafter. In 2017, he was sentenced to a fine for fighting with a 21-year-old man in a nightclub in Vigo, Galicia, and his attacker had to pay him €15,000.

On 18 January 2018, Casademunt's only daughter, Bruna, was born.

On 2 March 2021, Casademunt died in a car accident after his vehicle collided head-on with a bus near a roundabout on the Cirera road in Mataró, Barcelona. His funeral was held on 4 March.
