= David Civera =

Spanish singer

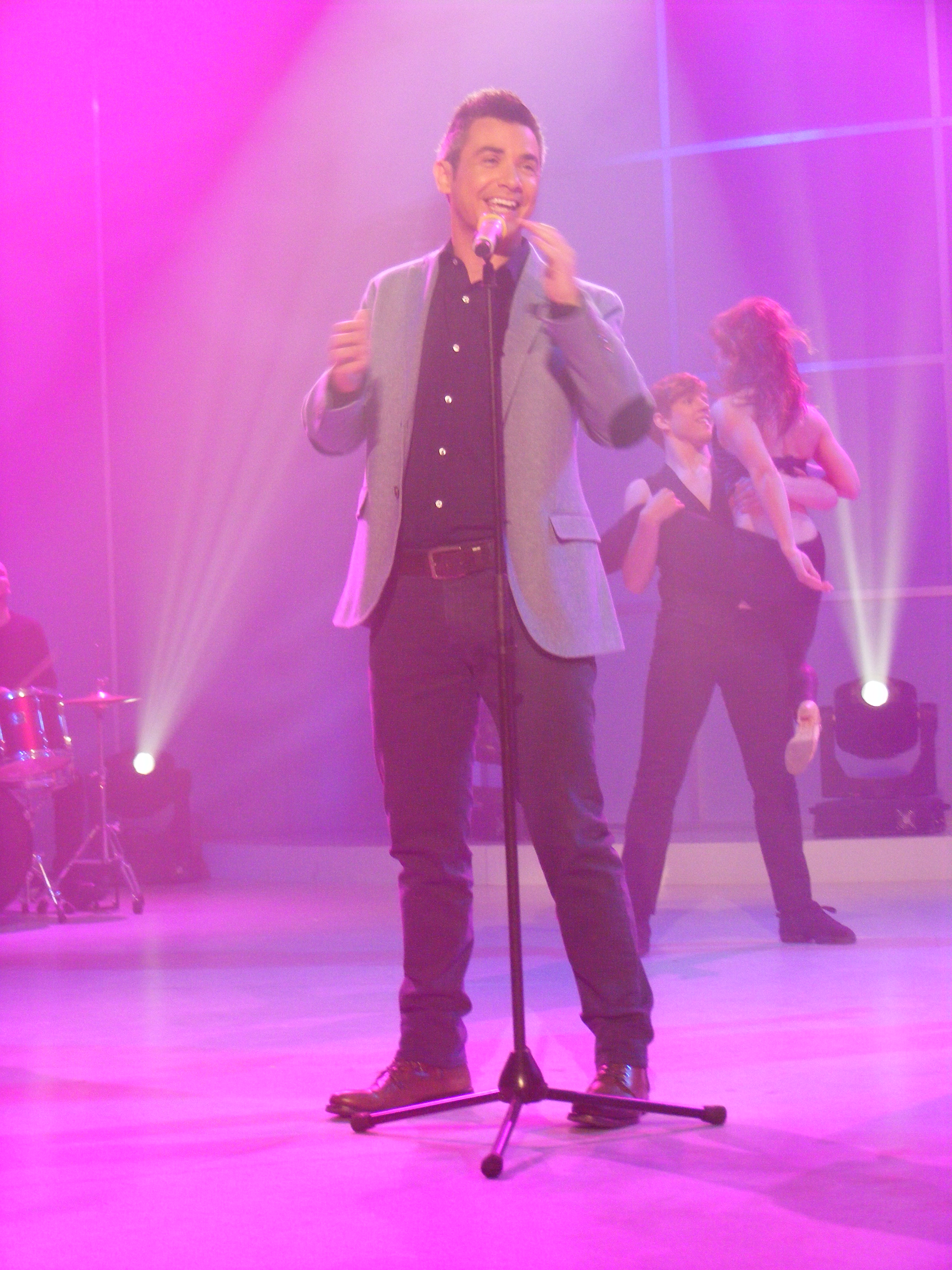
- David Civera in the 906th episode of Luar

Background information
- Born: David Civera Gracia; 8 January 1979 (age 46); Teruel, Spain
- Genres: Pop, Latin pop, Rock
- Years active: 2001–present
- Labels: ValeMusic Spain

David Civera Gracia (born in Teruel, Aragón, Spain on 8 January 1979) is a Spanish singer.

== Biography ==
Civera was born in Teruel, in 1979. His parents are José and Pilar and he has two sisters, Sonia is older than David, and Andrea is the youngest. David studied Computer Studies and Communications but he preferred music and wanted to sing. His father traveled with him from Teruel to Valencia where David received solfège, guitar and piano classes twice a month.

He won a national karaoke TV show and participated in other TV programs (El sur de Jerez, Las estrellas del parque etc.). Then, in 1996, he took part in the TV show Lluvia de estrellas, where participants impersonated a fashionable artist. He impersonated Enrique Iglesias with the song "Experiencia religiosa". He failed to win this program. However he was told he had his own style. Shortly afterwards, he made his only appearance on Antena 3's La parodia nacional where, assigned the artist name of "Lolo Pocholo," he once again impersonated Iglesias singing the parodied "Enriquito y su papá."

In 1997, he took part in a new TV show Canciones de nuestra vida, where participants covered old songs, and at the same time he released his first CD Hoy como ayer. However this CD failed to gain commercial success.

Later, he took part in other TV shows too. Eventually this led him to meet producer Alejandro Abad, who suggested him to participate in Eurocanción, the TV show used to choose the Spanish representative for the Eurovision Song Contest 2001. He accepted and on 23 February 2001, he was chosen to represent Spain in the Eurovision Song Contest with the song "Dile que la quiero" (Tell Her That I Love Her).

At the Eurovision final that took place in Copenhagen, Denmark on 12 May 2001, he finished in 6th position, which has been surpassed by consequent Spanish representatives only in 2022.

=== Career after Eurovision ===
He released a new album titled Dile que la quiero, which achieved a great success. A year later, in 2002, he released the album En cuerpo y alma that sold more than 200,000 copies, and its first single "Que la detengan" eventually became a summer hit. In 2003, he went to New Orleans to record a new album, La Chiqui Big Band. This album included two new hits, "Bye Bye" and "Rosa y espinas". The latter was a duet with David Bisbal.

2004 was a relatively quiet year for Civera, but he released a concert DVD among other things.

In 2005, he released Perdóname, a tango-inspired album. The same year, Civera participated in ¡Mira quién baila! (Spanish version of Dancing with the Stars). Civera won this competition and donated the monetary prize to patients with Alzheimer's disease.

In 2006 he released the album Ni el primero ni el último, which contained mostly ballads and a few dance songs. The first single was "El orgullo y la Visa".

In 2007 he published the album No bastará, where there was an evolution to pop. In 2009 he released Podemos elegir.

=== Personal life ===
He got married in 2007 with his girlfriend Ana María Benedi. They had been together since they were teenagers. In 2011 they had their first son, Daniel.

== Discography ==
Information
Hoy como ayer
- Released: 1997
- Sales: –
- Certification: –
Dile que la quiero
- Released: 2001
- Sales: 300,000+
- Certification: 3× Platinum
- Singles:
  - "Dile que la quiero" – #1 SPA
  - "Caminar por la vida" – #1 SPA
  - "Muévete"
En cuerpo y alma
- Released: 2002
- Sales: 100,000+
- Certification: Platinum
- Singles:
  - "Que la detengan" – #1 SPA
  - "Necesito amar a esa mujer" – #24 SPA
  - "En cuerpo y alma"
La Chiqui Big Band
- Released: 2003
- Sales: 150,000+
- Certification: Platinum
- Singles:
  - "Bye Bye" – #1 SPA
  - "Rosa y espinas" (Duet with David Bisbal) – No. 1 SPA
  - "La Chiqui Big Band" – No. 37 SPA
Perdóname
- Released: 2005
- Sales: 200,000+
- Certification: 2× Platinum
- Singles:
  - "Perdóname" – #1 SPA
  - "Gloria bendita"
  - "Dicen por ahí"
Ni el primero ni el último
- Released: 2006
- Sales: 30,000+
- Certification: –
- Singles:
  - "El orgullo y la visa" – #1 SPA
No bastará
- Released: 2007
- Sales: +30.000
- Certification: –
- Singles:
  - "No bastará" – #1 SPA
  - "De lo que hiciste por mí"
Para vivir contigo
- Released: 2008
- Sales: #28
- Certification: –
- Singles:
  - "Para vivir contigo"
Grandes éxitos (Greatest hits)
- Released: 2008
- Sales: #64
- Certification: –
- Singles: –
Podemos elegir
- Released: 2009
- Sales: #58
- Certification:
- Singles: –
A ritmo de clásicos
- Released: 2011
- Sales: #6
- Certification:
- Singles:
  - "Gloria"
Versión original
- Released: 2013
- Sales: #81
- Certification:
- Singles: –
David Civera – 15 Aniversario
- Released: 2016
- Sales: #52 SPA
- Certification:
- Singles: –

Preceded by Serafín Zubiri with "Colgado de un sueño"	Spain in the Eurovision Song Contest; 2001	Succeeded by Rosa with "Europe's Living a Celebration"
