= Natalia (Spanish singer) =

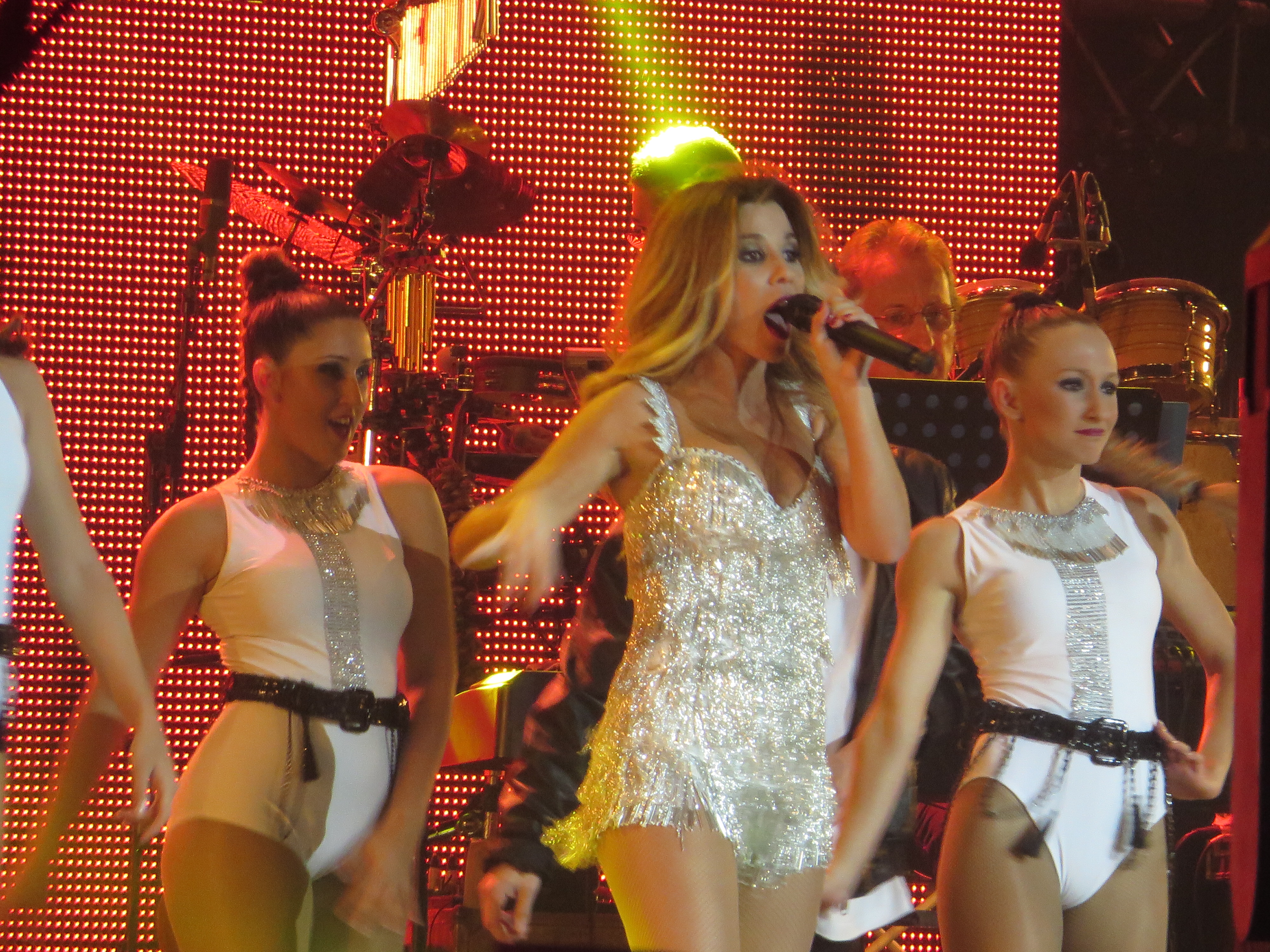
- Natalia in 2016

Background information
- Born: Natalia Rodríguez Gallego; 11 December 1982 (age 43)
- Origin: Sanlúcar de Barrameda (Cádiz), Spain
- Genres: Pop, dance
- Years active: 2001–present (solo)
- Label: Vale Music (2001–2003). Tool Music (2003–2005). Antena 3 (2003–2007). Universal Music (2006–2009). Independent (2009-Act)
- Website: Official Website

Natalia Rodríguez Gallego (born 11 December 1982) better known as Natalia is a Spanish singer and television presenter. She became well known as a contestant on the Spanish television talent show Operación Triunfo in 2001. Her many albums include No soy un ángel (I'm Not an Angel) and her compilation album Un poco de mí (A Little of Me).

== Career ==
Natalia was a contestant on the successful Spanish TV show Operación Triunfo in 2001, where she finished 13th.

In 2002, she released her album No soy un ángel (I'm Not an Angel), produced by British dance producers Xenomania and the first single off the album, Vas a volverme loca, a cover version of Charlotte Nielsen's hit "You Got Me Going Crazy".

In 2003, Natalia released Besa mi piel (Kiss My Skin). On this album, she included 4 of her own compositions (including the first single, also called 'Besa Mi Piel').

In 2004, she released Natalia, her third album. The first single was track penned by Lucie Silvas called Sombras (Shadows). The video (which featured Natalia in a haunted house being seduced by a ghost) was regarded as too inappropriate for young children and wasn't shown on Spanish TV until the late evening, which caused a flop in sales. Amid this, the second single, Que No Puede Ser (No, It Can't Be), became a lot more successful than the first single, due to another expensive video (this time, based on the film Mean Girls) and a big promotional tour across Spain, where Natalia sang live on many important TV shows. This album, however, was mainly based on rock music. It included a version of AC/DC's Highway to Hell.

Natalia has appeared on many other artists albums. In 2004, she appeared on an album by Spanish singer Tony Aguilar on a song called Vuelve. With addition to this, Natalia has appeared on American rapper AT's album Electric Grease with the song “I Love This Game”.

Natalia took a break for a year. However, in September 2005, she made her comeback. First of all, she came first in the Spanish reality TV program Gente de Primera, where celebrities take a member of the public and transform them into pop stars.

In June 2006, Natalia released her fourth album, Nada es lo que crees (Nothing's What You Think). It got to number No.9, four places lower than 'Natalia'. The first single, “Loco por mí” (Mad About Me), got to No.1 in the Spanish chart, solely on Internet Downloads. In January 2007, half a year after the first single was released, it was announced that the second single would be A Tí (To You). However, without a promotional video, it did not make the Spanish chart.

In November 2007, Natalia returned with a new album, Radikal, and a new single, Rebelde en Libertad. Radikal debuted in the Spanish charts at 56.

From 2010 to 2013, Natalia released six singles vía Internet: the single "Free Yourself" and "Indómita" were huge hits.

== Personal life ==
Natalia grew up in Cádiz. She lived in Barcelona from 2002 to 2004. In 2004, she settled in Madrid.

== Discography ==
=== Albums ===
Year	Title	Chart positions	Sales/Certification	Ref.
Year	Title	Spain	Sales/Certification	Ref.
2002	No Soy Un Ángel: First studio album; Released: 5 March 2002; Formats: CD, Cassette	5	Spain sales: 300,000; Platinum	
2003	Besa Mi Piel: Second studio album; Released: 4 April 2003; Formats: CD	11	Spain sales: 190,000; Gold	
2004	Natalia: Third studio album; Released: 13 June 2004; Formats: CD	15	Spain sales: 120,000	
2006	Nada Es Lo Que Crees: Fourth studio album; Released: 17 May 2006; Formats: CD	9	Spain sales: 200,000	
2007	Radikal: Fifth studio album; Released: 13 November 2007; Formats: CD	55	Spain sales: 90,000	
2017	Un Poco De Mí: Sixth studio album; Released: 19 May 2017; Formats: CD	16		

=== Singles ===
- All regularly Singles and their chart peak position: Spain (SPA), United Kingdom (UK), Dominican Republic (DR).

Year	Title	Album	Chart positions		
Year	Title	Album	SPA	UK	DR
2002	"Vas a Volverme Loca" "You Got Me Going Crazy"	No Soy Un Ángel	1		
2002	"La Noche Llegó"	No Soy Un Ángel	1		
2002	"No Soy Un Ángel"	No Soy Un Ángel	5		
2003	"Besa Mi Piel"	Besa Mi Piel	1		
2003	"Sólo Tu Amor"	Besa Mi Piel	4		
2003	"No, No"	Besa Mi Piel	20		
2004	"Sombras"	Natalia	1		
2004	"Que No Puede Ser"	Natalia	1		
2004	"Gasolina"	Natalia	34		
2005	"I Love This Game (featuring. AT)"	–	7	49	4
2006	"Loco Por Mí"	Nada es lo que crees	1		
2007	"A Tí"	Nada es lo que crees	89		
2007	"Orden de Desalojo"	Radikal	19		
2007	"Rebelde En Libertad"	Radikal	2		
2008	"Ni un minuto más"	Radikal	9	-	-
2010	"Liberate"	-	1	16	-
		Top ten hits	9	0	1

== Videography ==
- Vas a volverme loca (2002)
- La noche llegó (2002)
- No soy un ángel (2002)
- Besa mi piel (2003)
- Sólo tu amor (2003)
- Sombras (2004)
- Que no puede ser (2004)
- I love this game"(feat Lexter) (2005)
- Loco por mi (2006)
- Orden de desalojo (2007)
- Rebelde en libertad (2007)
- Libérate (2010)
- Go (2011)
- Rhythm is a dancer (2011)
- Indómita (2011)
- Tú (2013)
- Nunca digas no (2013)

== Filmography ==
- OT: La película (2002)
- Arde la calle (2005)
- Nocturna (2007) - voice
- El Arca de Noé (2007) - voice

== Trivia ==
- Although she was 12th in the first edition of Spain's version of Fame Academy, Operación Triunfo, she was: the first contestant to receive a record deal, first to release 2, 3 then 4 albums and first to have a single in a non-Spanish speaking country (one week before David Bisbal released his debut in Germany), a duet with Joanne Zimmer.
- In May 2005, the video of I Love This Game got premiered on CD:UK, a British music program on ITV.
- In November 2012 Natalia made her international debut at a private Gala function for Action Care a humanitarian focused company in Dubai. The prominent multicultural audience greatly enjoyed Natalia's lively performance. As well she debuted her new heart touching song "Find My Own Way".
- She was one of the Spanish national Jury at the Eurovision Song Contest 2017 held at Kyiv, Ukraine.

== See also ==
- Operación Triunfo
