= Rosa López =

Spanish singer (born 1981)

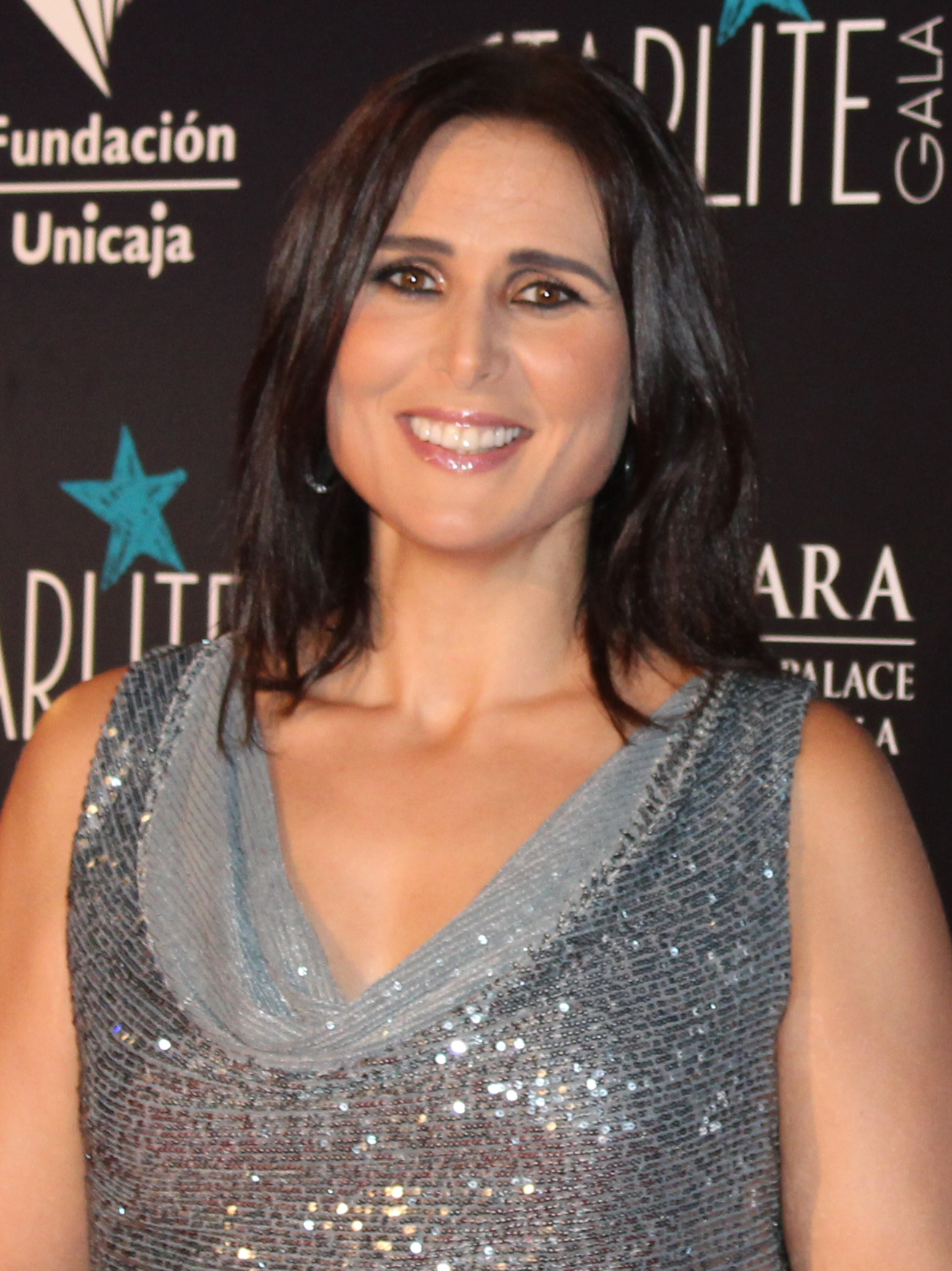
- Rosa López at the Starlite Gala in 2019

Background information
- Also known as: Rosa de España
- Born: Rosa María López Cortés; 14 January 1981 (age 45); Láchar (Granada), Spain
- Genres: R&B, dance, pop, disco
- Occupation: Singer
- Instrument: Vocals
- Years active: 2001–present
- Website: www.rosalopezoficial.com

Rosa María López Cortés (born 14 January 1981) is a Spanish singer of various musical genres.

She dabbled in music in her teens as the main vocalist for various groups in the province and city of Granada. In the 2000s, she gained fame as an artist by winning the first edition of Operación Triunfo, where she was given the nickname "Rosa de España." After that, she represented Spain in the Eurovision Song Contest 2002, with the song "Europe's Living a Celebration". It was her first musical success and reached number one on the Los 40 radio tally.

In 2002, she recorded her debut album, Rosa, which reached number one on the Promusicae chart with record sales. The following year, she achieved the same position for two consecutive weeks with her second album Now and achieved another number one on Los 40 with the song "La esencia de tu voz". In addition, the songs "A solas con mi corazón" and "Don't stop the music, baby" reached sixth and second place, respectively, in physical sales by Promusicae and the latter the fifth in Los 40. For this reason, she received the Dial award as one of the most outstanding interpreters of 2003 in Spain. Three years later, she received the Antena de Oro award for her work in the world of music. In the following years, she continued to be active, publishing a series of recordings that reached the top of the aforementioned list. In addition, she participated in various entertainment programs; in the third edition of Mira quién baila! It was proclaimed the winner, while in the fifth edition of Tu cara me suena, she finished second.

She was recognized by the Junta de Andalucía with two distinctions: the regional medal in 2002, and the Andalusian flag award in 2010. She received the Armilla gold medal. Throughout her career, she has sold more than a million copies and has accumulated a total of seven platinum and four gold records.

== Background ==
Rosa María López Cortés was born in Peñuelas, Láchar (Granada) on 14 January 1981 to Eduardo López and Francisca Cortés. She was raised in the town of Peñuelas with her parents and her three brothers.

Rosa started singing at weddings, baptisms, communions and celebrations for the people of Granada over the weekends with her younger brother at the piano and her father. She was a member of several orchestras and later created the Trio Roxa.

In September 2001, Rosa auditioned for the new reality show Operación Triunfo and she was selected to enter the show's academy. On 22 October 2001, at the age of 20, she became one of the 16 contestants of the first season of Operación Triunfo. One of the prizes of the competition was to become the Spanish entrant at the Eurovision Song Contest 2002. Soon titled "Rosa de España" ("Rose of Spain"), she won the competition on 11 February 2002 with 26.6% of the votes, in a finale that achieved a record audience of 10,680,000 viewers and a share of 58.8%.

From 4 April to 1 June 2002, the 16 participants of Operación Triunfo toured 27 cities in Spain with 600,000 tickets sold, performing sold-out concerts at the Palau Sant Jordi in Barcelona and the Santiago Bernabéu Stadium in Madrid. TVE 1 aired the Bernabéu Stadium concert, becoming the most-watched concert in Spain, with 5,136,000 viewers and a 39.5% share. The re-run of this concert on 9 July resulted in 3,174,000 million viewers and a 27.9% Share.

== Music career ==
=== 2002–2005: First album and first success stories ===
Once proclaimed the winner of Operation Triunfo, López began her musical career by signing a three-album deal with Sony BMG Music, RCA Records and Vale Music. She starred in several TV spots like Todos contra el fuego for the Ministry of the Environment (along with fellow Operación Triunfo contestants), and for New World Jewels, the latter with a two-year deal. On 25 April 2002, she released the namesake studio album Rosa, consisting of Latin pop genre compositions by songwriters such as Armando Manzanero, Inma Serrano and José Luis Perales. The album was commercially successful, selling over 500,000 copies in Spain, and her first single, "Europe's Living a Celebration", topped the hit list of radio Los 40 Principales. With "Europe's Living a Celebration", she finished in the 7th position at the Eurovision Song Contest 2002 in Tallinn. The summer after Eurovision, López extensively toured Spain. During the tour, she started having problems with her voice but continued working until mid-September, when she cancelled the rest of the tour. López spent a year out of the public eye, and due to speculation, she called a press conference where she explained that she would soon return to the stage.

On 29 October 2003, López released her second album Ahora, with a dance-pop style. The album was a commercial success and exceeded sales projections, reaching number one twice on the official albums chart; its lead single "La esencia de tu voz" topped Los 40 Principales' hit list. From April to September 2004, she conducted a promotional tour of the album. In June 2004, López travelled to Venezuela for a fortnight to promote the album to the media. A few weeks later, she became the image of the computer brand Odin. On 16 November 2004, she released her third album, Ójala, which was intended to be a small gift for her fans by singing Christmas songs and new songs written for the occasion. In 2005, López decided to take a sabbatical year with small appearances on television and a short tour with the Granada Blues Band, touring major cities in the region of Andalusia.

The singer and Granada Blues Band recorded two singles, one of which became part of the soundtrack of the movie Buscando a Emma. A few months later, she recorded the title song of the movie Torrente 3: El protector.

=== 2006–2009: Musical transition and personal evolution ===
In 2006, Rosa López undertook a new stage of her professional career, having lost 40 kilos of weight, with a modern image and more mature themes. In early 2006, she participated in the dancing talent show Mira quién baila (Spanish version of Strictly Come Dancing), where she was proclaimed winner of the season. On 30 May, she launched her fourth studio album Me siento viva with dance-pop sounds that represented a major change from her previous works, mixed by internationally renowned sound engineers Ankelius Martin and Dan Hetzel. At the end of June, she started the tour Me siento viva until October; shortly after the start of the tour, she became the image of XLS products. In early December, she appeared in the special show commemorating the 50 years of history of Televisión Española, performing Rocío Jurado's hit song "Como una ola". Later that month, on 26 December 2006, also in TVE, she appeared in the special show Disco del Año, where the audience chose the best album of the year in Spain. Her album Me siento viva was named the best album of the year with the 27% of the votes.

During 2007, she debuted as an actress in the theatre play La menegilda, and also appeared in several TV series and television adverts. In summer 2007, she returned to stage for the Me siento viva concert tour. López decided to prepare a new album for early 2008, but due to the death of her father, the album was postponed. In 2008, she was chosen by TVE to represent Spain in the Eurovision Dance Contest 2008, but shortly before the competition took place, TVE decided to pull out of the contest.

On 7 October 2008, her fifth studio album Promesas was released, consisting of covers of 10 classic international Pop-rock songs from the 80s and 90s, produced by Jordi Cristau. On 22 December López participated in the special show aired by TVE Plácido y la copla, a tribute to the copla genre and to Plácido Domingo, performing the songs "Súspiros de España" and "La Zarzamora". In June 2009, she began the tour Promesas in her native city of Granada, which took her across the country.

On 3 November 2009, López released her sixth album Propiedad de nadie, consisting of songs written by José Luis Perales and produced by his son Pablo Perales.

=== 2010–present: New albums and television shows ===
In 2010, López performed in events such as Gala Especial Manolo Escobar, a tribute to Manolo Escobar aired on television, where she performed "Solo te pido" together with Manolo Escobar and "¡Qué viva España!" together with Escobar and the rest of the guest performers. An episode of docu-reality Volver con... on TVE centred on her. López participated in the ceremony of Beatification of Leopold of Alpandeire at the airbase of Armilla, Granada, performing Schubert's Ave Maria. Also that year, she conducted two tours across Spain: the Propiedad de nadie tour with 14 concerts, and the Gira 10 Aniversario tour with nine concerts, which lasted until 2011.

Her seventh studio album, the second namesake album of her career Rosa López, was released on 19 June 2012, produced by Alejandro de Pinedo. The lead single of the album was a cover of Mari Trini's song "Yo no soy esa"; the album was a return to the dance-pop genre after six years. The tour that accompanied the album began on 13 May 2012 in Madrid and continued in 2013 and 2014 with more than 40 concerts in theatres across Spain.

In 2015, López was part of the talent show for songwriters Hit - la canción (Spanish version of Irish format The Hit), aired on TVE 1. In the show, López picked to perform the song "Me da igual", which was released as a single. On 10 February 2015, in the show's finale, "Me da igual" was voted the winner by the audience. It peaked at number 11 on the Spanish Singles Chart.

On 31 March 2015, López performed at the special concert show Eurovision Song Contest's Greatest Hits in London, produced by the BBC and the EBU, which commemorated the 60th anniversary of the Eurovision Song Contest.

On 14 July 2016, López was announced to join the cast of the fifth season of the television show Tu cara me suena, in which celebrity contestants impersonate a different iconic music artist on stage each week. The season premiered on 7 October 2016 on Antena 3. In the season finale that took place on 4 March 2017, she finished in second place. In 2016, López, along with the rest of contestants from the first season of Operación Triunfo, starred in the television special OT: El Reencuentro, which commemorated the 15th anniversary of the show. OT: El Reencuentro consisted of three docu-show episodes and a live concert that was aired on La 1 from Palau Sant Jordi in Barcelona on 31 October 2016 with 4.1 million viewers.

On 26 May 2017, López released the single "Ahora pienso en mí", which preceded the release of her eighth studio album Kairós, on 30 June 2017. The release of the album coincided in time with the premiere on 26 June 2017 of a six-episode reality television series starred by López, Soy Rosa, which focuses on her personal and professional life. The series aired on Ten.

== 2002: Eurovision Song Contest ==
In the finale of the Eurovision phase of Operación Triunfo, the audience decided that Rosa would represent Spain in the Eurovision Song Contest to be held in Tallinn, Estonia on 22 May 2002, with the song "Europe's Living a Celebration".

Rosa performed the song "Europe's Living a Celebration", accompanied by fellow Operación Triunfo contestants David Bisbal, David Bustamante, Chenoa, Gisela and Geno Machado as backing singers and finished in 7th position with 81 points, despite being tipped to win by the Spanish media. Yet the broadcast achieved an audience of 14,380,000 viewers in Spain (85.2% Share), becoming the most-watched programme in the history of television in Spain since the arrival of private broadcasters (1990). It remained the most-watched television broadcast in Spain until it was surpassed by the final of UEFA Euro 2008.

== Other projects ==
=== 2006 and 2008: Mira quién baila ===
In 2006, López was proclaimed winner of the third season of Mira quién baila (Spanish version of Strictly Come Dancing) with 62% of the popular vote, followed by Milene Domingues and David Meca.

On 7 January 2008, López took part in a special episode to choose the best dancer among almost all the contestants who had participated in the first six seasons. In this special, López was proclaimed the winner.

== Albums ==
- 2002: Rosa #1 Spain (500.000 units) 5× platinum
- 2003: Ahora #1 Spain (200.000 units) 2× platinum
- 2004: Ojalá #4 Spain (50.000 units) gold
- 2005: Rosa En Concierto (DVD) #9 Spain
- 2006: Me siento viva #2 Spain (40.000 units) gold
- 2008: Promesas #2 Spain (40.000 units) gold
- 2009: Propiedad de nadie #5 Spain (30.000 units) gold
- 2012: Rosa López #4 Spain
- 2013: Lo mejor de Rosa
- 2017: Kairós #2 Spain
- 2023: Señales #69 Spain

== Tours ==
- 2002: Gira Rosa
- 2004: Gira Ahora
- 2006–2007: Gira Me Siento Viva
- 2009: Gira Promesas
- 2010: Propiedad De Nadie Tour 2010
- 2010-2011: Gira 10 aniversario
- 2012-2014: Gira Rosa López

Awards and achievements
Preceded by David Civera with "Dile que la quiero"	Spain in the Eurovision Song Contest; 2002	Succeeded by Beth with "Dime"
Preceded by -	Operacion Triunfo Winner; 2001–2002	Succeeded by Ainhoa Cantalapiedra
