= Vale Music =

Spanish record label

- Industry: Dance, pop
- Founded: 1997
- Defunct: 2011
- Headquarters: Barcelona, Catalonia, Spain
- Parent: Universal Music Group
- Subsidiaries: O'clock music and Tool music
- Website: Vale Music

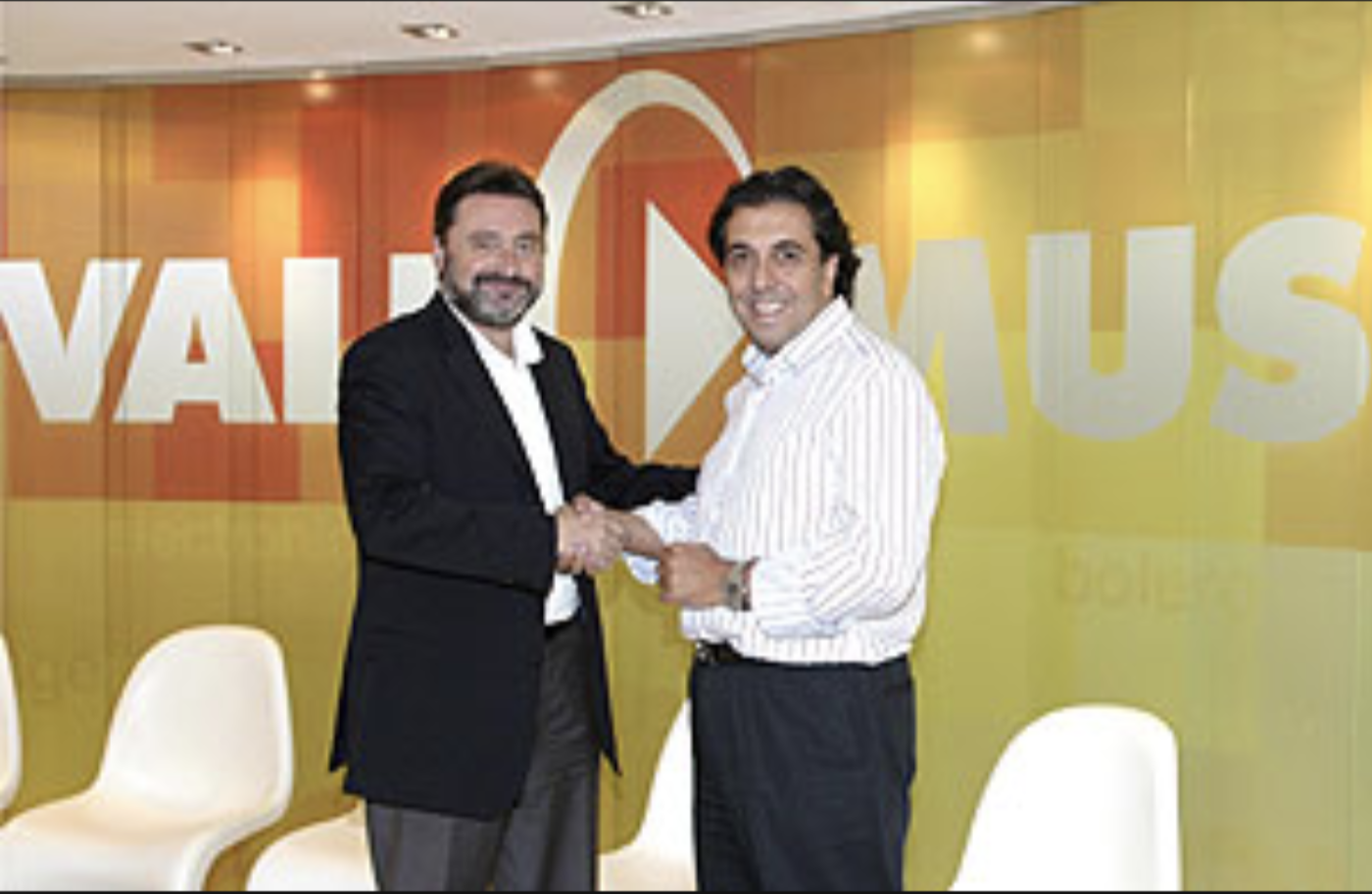
Ricardo Campoy, president of Vale Music, together with Jesús López, CEO of Universal Music Latin

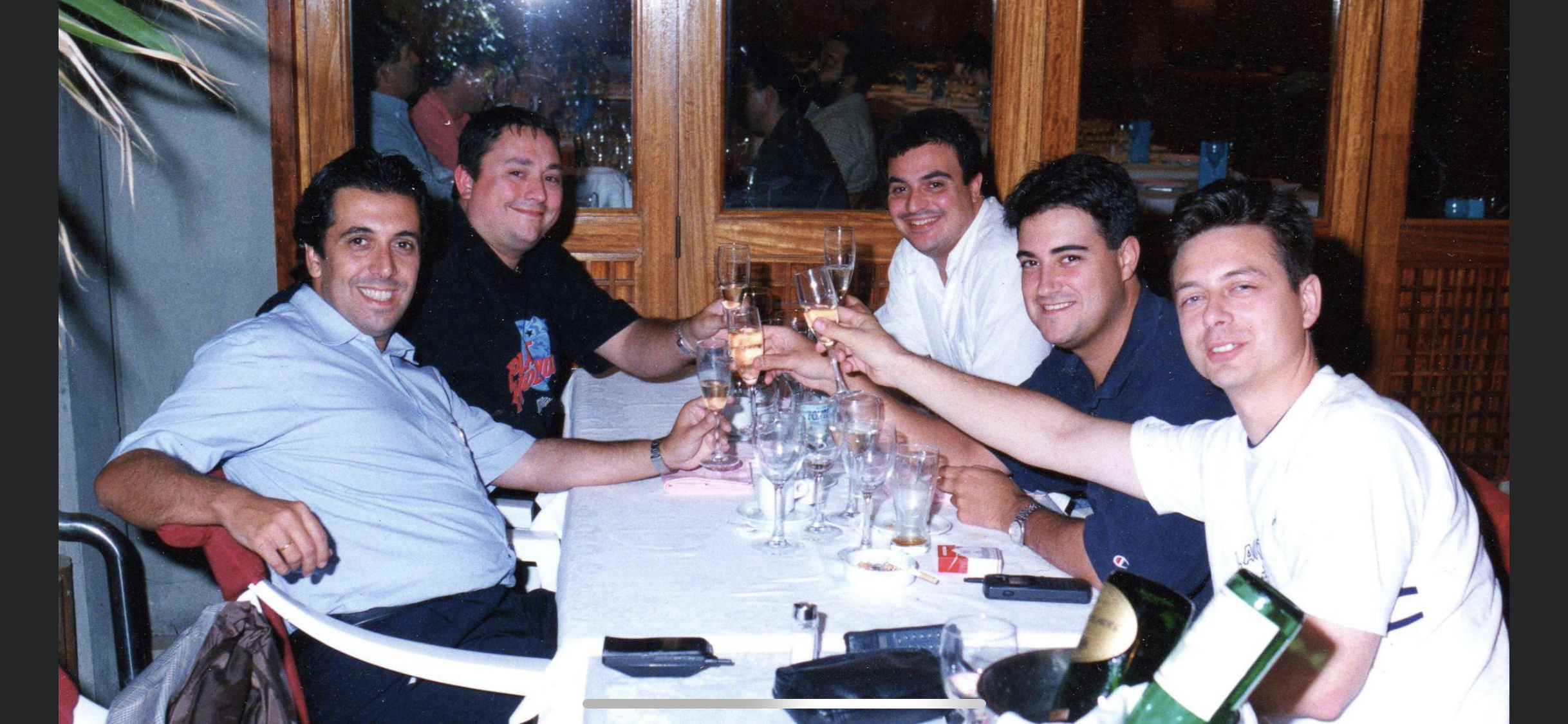
Ricardo Campoy with his team José María Castells, Andreu Ugas, Quique Tejada and Toni Peret

Vale Music was a Spanish record company founded and directed by Ricardo Campoy. Alongside him were José María Castells, Gabriel Blanco, Toni Peret, Quique Tejada, Andreu Ugas, and Narcís Rebollo, who came from Campoy's previous record label, Max Music. Universal Music Group acquired the label in 2006, thus forming part of the world's largest music company.

Its headquarters were in Barcelona, Spain, and was founded at the end of 1997. It became the largest record label in Spain. The Spanish company started its career specializing in 'dance' music and compilation albums such as Caribe, Disco Estrella, Todo Éxitos and Superventas, besides being the record label of several television projects such as Crónicas marcianas, Gran Hermano and Operación Triunfo.

Some of their artists have had great success since they left Spain to conquer new markets in other countries, such as David Bisbal, Manuel Carrasco and Juan Magán (Latin America, Europe, United States, Asia) and to a lesser extent, Rosario Flores, David Bustamante and María Isabel. They were also national successes singers such as Coyote Dax, Sonia and Selena, David Civera and King Africa.

The releases of Vale Music have generated worldwide sales of more than 14 million albums of individual artists and more than 7 million of compilation albums. The artists and repertoire are now under the label Universal Music Group.

== Vale Music artists ==
- Ainhoa Arteta
- Axel
- Batuka
- Beth
- David Bustamante
- Calle París
- Coyote Dax
- Chenoa
- Chipper
- David Bisbal
- David Civera
- Decai
- Gloria Trevi
- José Luis Perales
- Juan Magan
- Kate Ryan
- King Africa
- Lexter
- Manu Tenorio
- Manuel Carrasco
- María Isabel
- Merche\
- Nacha Pop
- OT
- Café Quijano
- Rosa López
- Rosario Flores
- Soraya Arnelas
- Víctor Ullate
- Viceversa
- Natalia
- La Unión
