= Verónica Romero =

Spanish singer

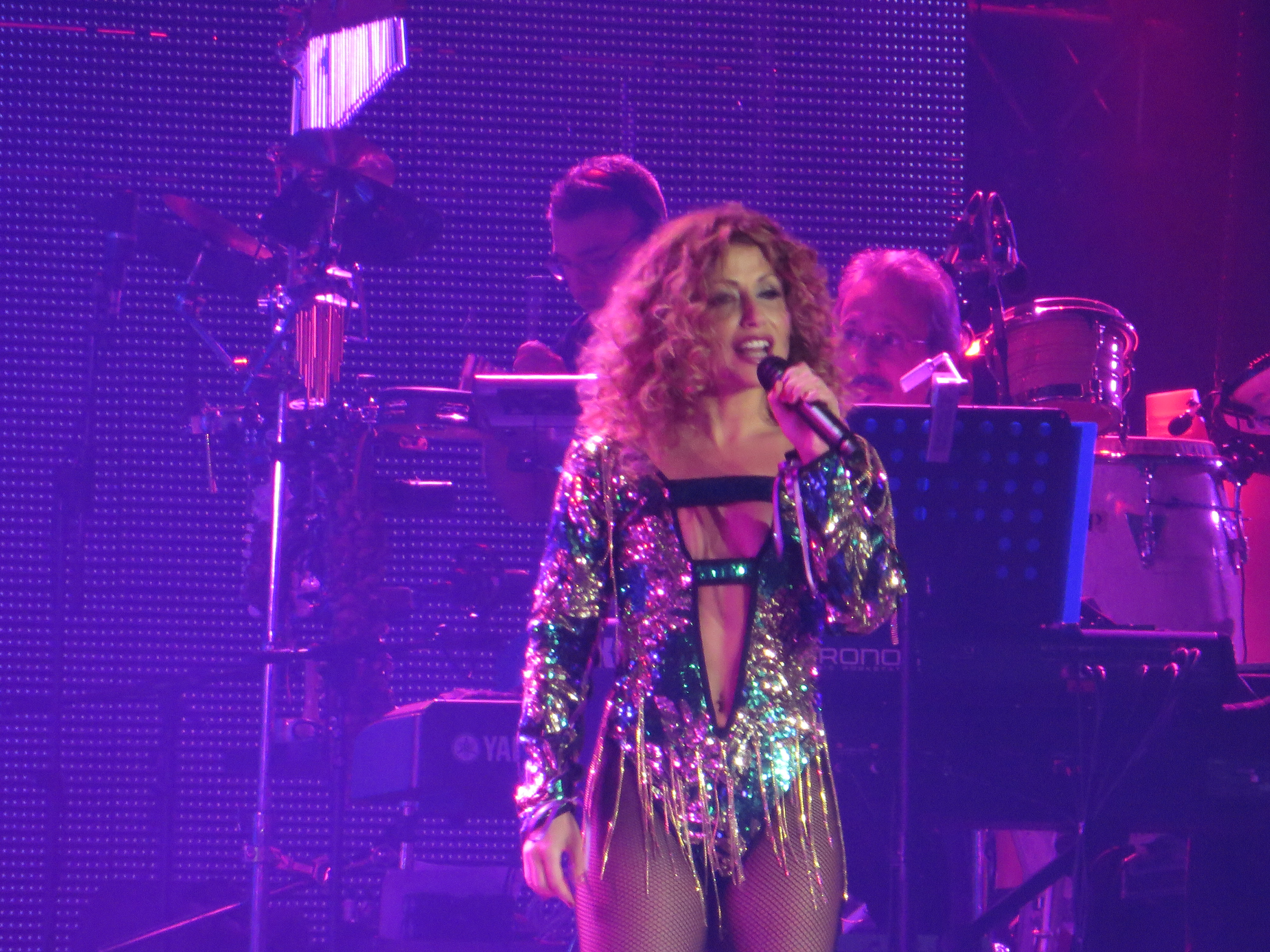
- Verónica at the 15th anniversary of OT concert at the Palau Sant Jordi of Barcelona (31 October 2016)

Background information
- Born: Verónica Romero Sotoca; 18 July 1978 (age 47)
- Origin: Elche (Alicante), Spain
- Genres: Pop rock; pop punk
- Occupations: Singer-songwriter; record producer; actress
- Instruments: Vocals, guitar
- Years active: 2001–present
- Label: VK48 Music
- Website: Official website

Verónica Romero Sotoca (born 18 July 1978 in Elche, Spain), simply known as Veronica Romero, is a Spanish singer and actress who rose to fame in 2001 after appearing on the reality singing contest Operación Triunfo, in which she finished in sixth place. Among the songs she performed on the program were "You'd Better Stop", "Un-break My Heart" ("Regresa a mí") and "One Day I'll Fly Away".

== Serotonina ==
Serotonina was released 2 October 2006. This is Romero's first album with her own label, VK48 Music. She has moved from R&B, pop and jazz influences to pop-punk pop rock music, although she still performs her old hits in her live performances. The first single released from Serotonina was "Sería Imposible". Romero composed the song herself, and the video is scheduled to be recorded live at one of her performances in Madrid. The second single was a song about MSN Messenger entitled "Conectado a Mi". The music video for this single features Antonio López, a soccer player with Atlético Madrid.

== Discography ==
=== Albums ===
- 2002 La Fuerza Del Sol
- 2003 Lluvia
- 2004 El Amor Brujo
- 2006 Serotonina
- 2009 EP Limited Edition

=== Singles ===
- 2002: "Bésame"
- 2002: "No Por él"
- 2004: "No hay otro amor (No Other Love)"
- 2004: "Tal Vez (So Long)"
- 2004: "Magnético (Magnetic)"
- 2006: "A 4 Ruedas" (promo)
- 2006: "Sería Imposible"
- 2007: "Conectado A Mi"
- 2009: "Latidos"
- 2009: "Hola Mundo"
- 2010: "Un Corazón Más Roto"
- 2011: "Contigo O Sin Ti" with Anand Bhatt

== Filmography ==
- 2003: "OT: La Película"
- 2005: "Fín De Curso"
- 2005: "Las Palabras De Vero"
- 2006: "La Abuela"
- 2008: "PUIU"
- 2009: "El Excesivo Consumo de Estrógenos de Ludoviko Graham"
