= Nuria Fergó =

Spanish singer and actress

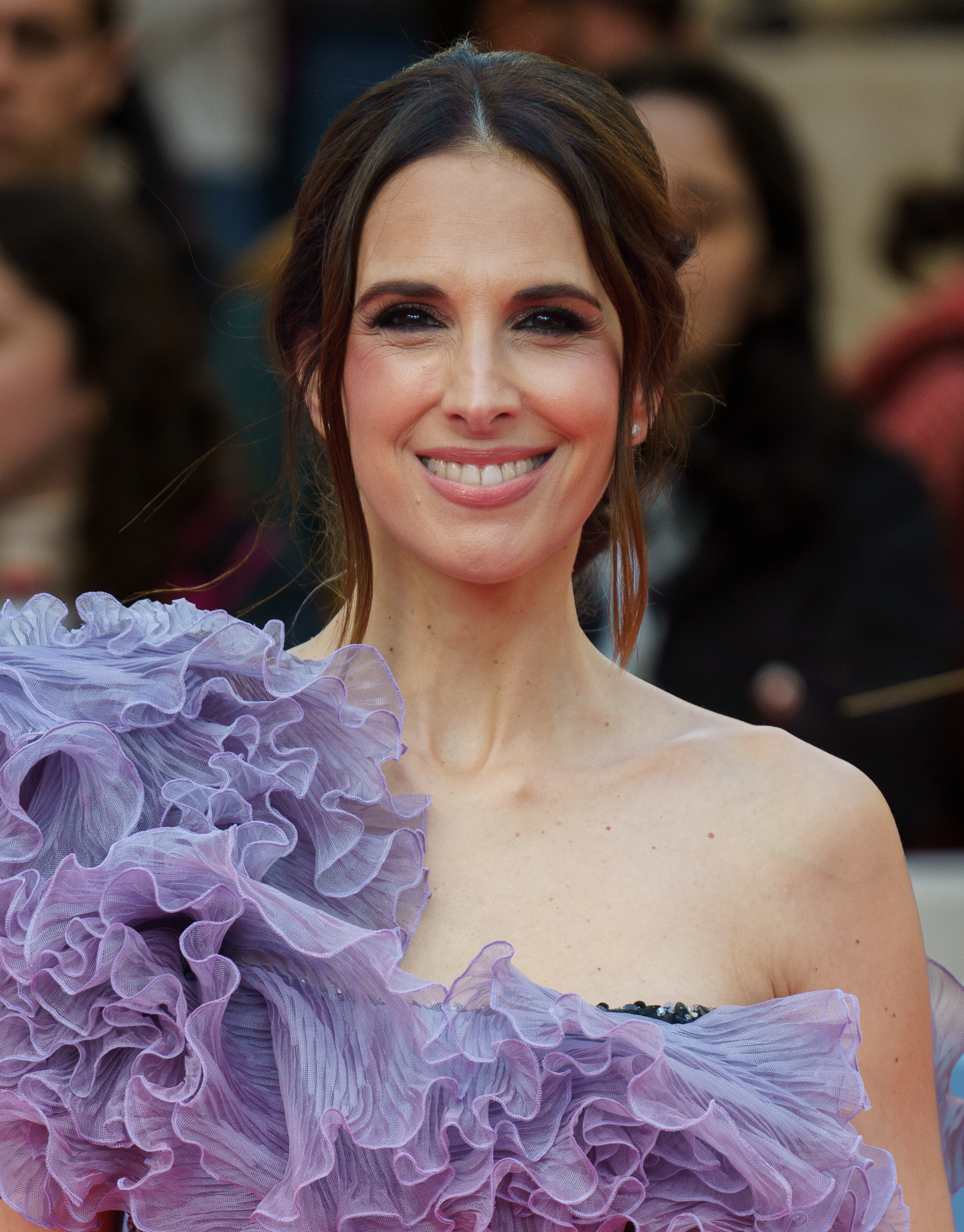
- Fergó at Malaga Film Festival 2025.
- Born: 18 April 1979 (age 46); Nerja (Málaga), Spain
- Other names: Latin pop, flamenco
- Occupations: Singer, actress
- Website: www.nuriafergo.es

Nuria Fernández Gómez (born Nerja, 18 April 1979) better known as Nuria Fergó is a Spanish singer and actress.

Fergó became famous thanks to Operación Triunfo. She has taken part in several TV programs and has released six albums. In 2009, she collaborated with Producer DJ Sammy on her album and chart hit "Tierra de Nadie".

In 2018, she recorded the song "La vida son sólo dos días", which became the official song of the 2018 Vuelta a España.

== Discography ==
- Brisa de esperanza (2002) (360,000 x3 Platinum)
- Locura (2003) (90,000 Gold)
- Paketenteres (2005) (50,000 Gold)
- Añoranzas (2007) (40,000 Gold)
- Tierra de nadie (2009)
- Con permiso (2022)

== Filmography ==
- 2000 Mediterráneo (Telecinco)
- 2000 Plaza alta (Canal Sur)
- 2002 OT: la película (Documental)
- 2003 La playa roja
- 2004 Amores extremos (TV-Movie)
- 2005 Náufragos (Shortfilm)
- 2007 Amar en tiempos revueltos (Televisión Española).
- 2016 Andersen and the Jinn (Cortometraje – Sheherazade) released 2018
