= United Kingdom in the Eurovision Song Contest 2010 =

- Eurovision Song Contest 2010
- Participating broadcaster: British Broadcasting Corporation (BBC)
- Country: United Kingdom
- Selection process: Eurovision: Your Country Needs You
- Selection date: 4 March 2010

Competing entry
- Song: "That Sounds Good to Me"
- Artist: Josh Dubovie
- Songwriters: Pete Waterman; Mike Stock; Steve Crosby

Placement
- Final result: 25th, 10 points

Participation chronology

The United Kingdom was represented at the Eurovision Song Contest 2010 with the song "That Sounds Good to Me", written by Pete Waterman, Mike Stock, and Steve Crosby, and performed by Josh Dubovie. The British participating broadcaster, the British Broadcasting Corporation (BBC), selected its entry in the contest via the national final Eurovision: Your Country Needs You 2010. Six acts competed in the national final and the winner was selected through two rounds of voting.

As a member of the "Big Four", the United Kingdom automatically qualified to compete in the final of the Eurovision Song Contest. Performing in position 12, the United Kingdom placed 25th (last) out of the 25 participating countries with 10 points, making it the third time the nation had placed last in the history of the competition.

== Background ==
Prior to the 2010 contest, the British Broadcasting Corporation (BBC) had participated in the Eurovision Song Contest representing the United Kingdom fifty-two times. Thus far, it has won the contest five times: in 1967 with the song "Puppet on a String" performed by Sandie Shaw, in 1969 with the song "Boom Bang-a-Bang" performed by Lulu, in 1976 with the song "Save Your Kisses for Me" performed by Brotherhood of Man, in 1981 with the song "Making Your Mind Up" performed by Bucks Fizz, and in 1997 with the song "Love Shine a Light" performed by Katrina and the Waves. To this point, the nation is noted for having finished as the runner-up in a record fifteen contests. Up to and including 1998, the UK had only twice finished outside the top 10, in 1978 and 1987. Since 1999, the year in which the rule was abandoned that songs must be performed in one of the official languages of the country participating, the UK has had less success, thus far only finishing within the top ten twice: in 2002 with the song "Come Back" performed by Jessica Garlick and in 2009 with the song "It's My Time" performed by Jade Ewen.

As part of its duties as participating broadcaster, the BBC organises the selection of its entry in the Eurovision Song Contest and broadcasts the event in the country. The broadcaster announced that it would participate in the 2010 contest on 9 November 2009. BBC has traditionally organised a national final featuring a competition among several artists and songs to choose the British entry for Eurovision. For their 2010 entry, the broadcaster announced that a national final involving a public vote would be held to select United Kingdom's entry.

== Before Eurovision ==
=== Eurovision: Your Country Needs You 2010 ===
Promotional image for Eurovision: Your Country Needs You 2010

Eurovision: Your Country Needs You 2010 was the national final developed by the BBC in order to select the British entry for the Eurovision Song Contest 2010. Six acts competed in a televised show on 4 March 2010 held at the BBC Television Centre in London and hosted by Graham Norton. The show was broadcast on BBC One and streamed online via the BBC iPlayer. The national final was watched by 2.9 million viewers in the United Kingdom with a market share of 12.6%.

==== Contestants ====
On 9 November 2009, casting company Jayne Collins Casting announced an open application for interested artists to attend auditions. The received applications were reviewed and a shortlist was compiled by BBC producers. The shortlist was then presented to a professional panel including producer and songwriter Pete Waterman, who was announced on 29 January 2010 to have been selected to compose the 2010 British Eurovision song together with his Stock Aitken Waterman partner Mike Stock, that ultimately selected six finalists to compete in the national final following a second audition. The six contestants were announced on 5 March 2010.

==== Final ====
Six acts competed in the televised final on 4 March 2010. In addition to their performances, guest performers included previous Eurovision Song Contest winner Alexander Rybak, who won the contest for Norway in 2009 with the song "Fairytale", and Sugababes (which among the members was Jade Ewen, who represented the United Kingdom in 2009 with the song "It's My Time") performing their song "Wear My Kiss". The contestants also performed the songs "Take a Chance On Me" and "Dancing Queen" by ABBA together.

A panel of experts provided feedback regarding the songs during the show. The panel consisted of Jade Ewen, Pete Waterman and Bruno Tonioli (choreographer, dancer and television personality). The winner was selected over two rounds of voting. In the first round, each of the artists performed a cover version of a Stock Aitken Waterman produced song and three were selected by Waterman to proceed to the second round. In the second round, the three remaining artists performed their versions of the British song "That Sounds Good to Me" and a public televote selected Josh Dubovie as the winner.

First Round – 4 March 2010
R/O	Artist	Song (Original artists)	Result
1	Karen Harding	"What Do I Have to Do" (Kylie Minogue)	—N/a
2	Alexis Gerred	"Never Gonna Give You Up" (Rick Astley)	Advanced
3	Uni5	"Last Thing on My Mind" (Bananarama)	—N/a
4	Esma Akkilic	"This Time I Know It's for Real" (Donna Summer)	Advanced
5	Josh Dubovie	"Too Many Broken Hearts" (Jason Donovan)	Advanced
6	Miss Fitz	"Better the Devil You Know" (Kylie Minogue)	—N/a

Second Round – 4 March 2010
R/O	Artist	Song	Place
1	Alexis Gerred	"That Sounds Good to Me"	2
2	Esma Akkilic	"That Sounds Good to Me"	3
3	Josh Dubovie	"That Sounds Good to Me"	1

=== Preparation ===
Following the national final, the co-composer of "That Sounds Good to Me", Mike Stock, stated that the song would be remixed in order to be more suited for Josh Dubovie. The new version was presented to the public on 22 April 2010.

=== Promotion ===
Josh Dubovie specifically promoted "That Sounds Good to Me" as the British Eurovision entry on 24 April by performing during the Eurovision in Concert event which was held at the Lexion venue in Zaanstad, Netherlands on 24 April and hosted by Cornald Maas and Marga Bult. Dubovie also performed "That Sounds Good to Me" in the Netherlands during the RTL 4 programme Life 4 You on 25 April. In addition to his international appearances, on 2 May, Josh Dubovie performed during the UKEurovision Preview Party, which was held at the La Scala venue in London, United Kingdom and hosted by Nicki French and Paddy O'Connell.

== At Eurovision ==
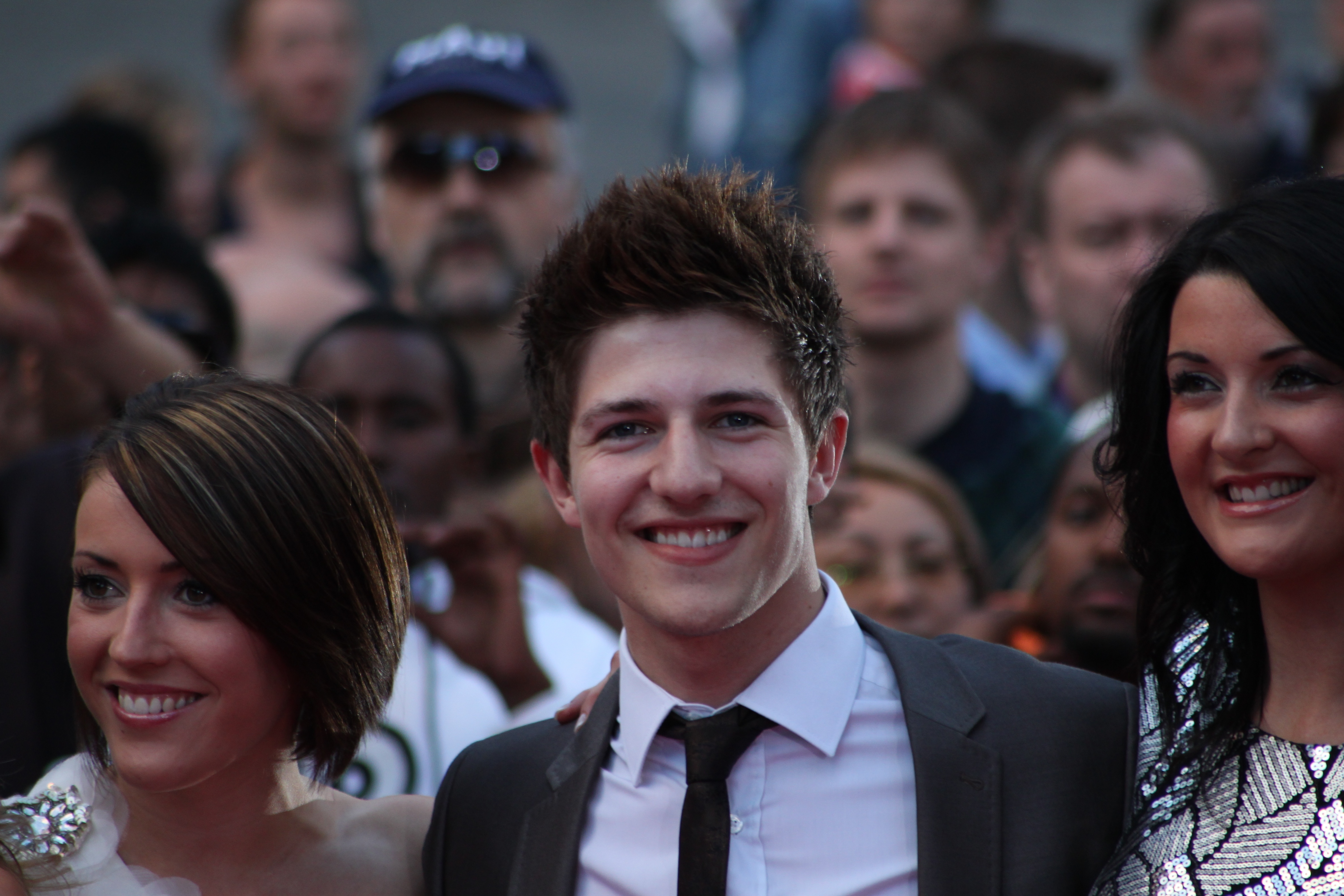
Josh Dubovie at the Eurovision Opening Party in Oslo

According to Eurovision rules, all nations with the exceptions of the host country and the "Big Four" (France, Germany, Spain and the United Kingdom) are required to compete in one of two semi-finals, and qualify in order to participate in the final; the top ten countries from each semi-final progress to the final. As a member of the "Big Four", the United Kingdom automatically qualified to compete in the final on 29 May 2010. In addition to their participation in the final, the United Kingdom is also required to broadcast and vote in one of the two semi-finals. During the semi-final allocation draw on 7 February 2010, the United Kingdom was assigned to broadcast and vote in the second semi-final on 27 May 2010.

In the United Kingdom, the semi-finals were broadcast on BBC Three with commentary by Paddy O'Connell and Sarah Cawood. The final was televised on BBC One with commentary by Graham Norton and broadcast on BBC Radio 2 with commentary by Ken Bruce. The British spokesperson, who announced the British votes during the final, was Scott Mills.

=== Final ===
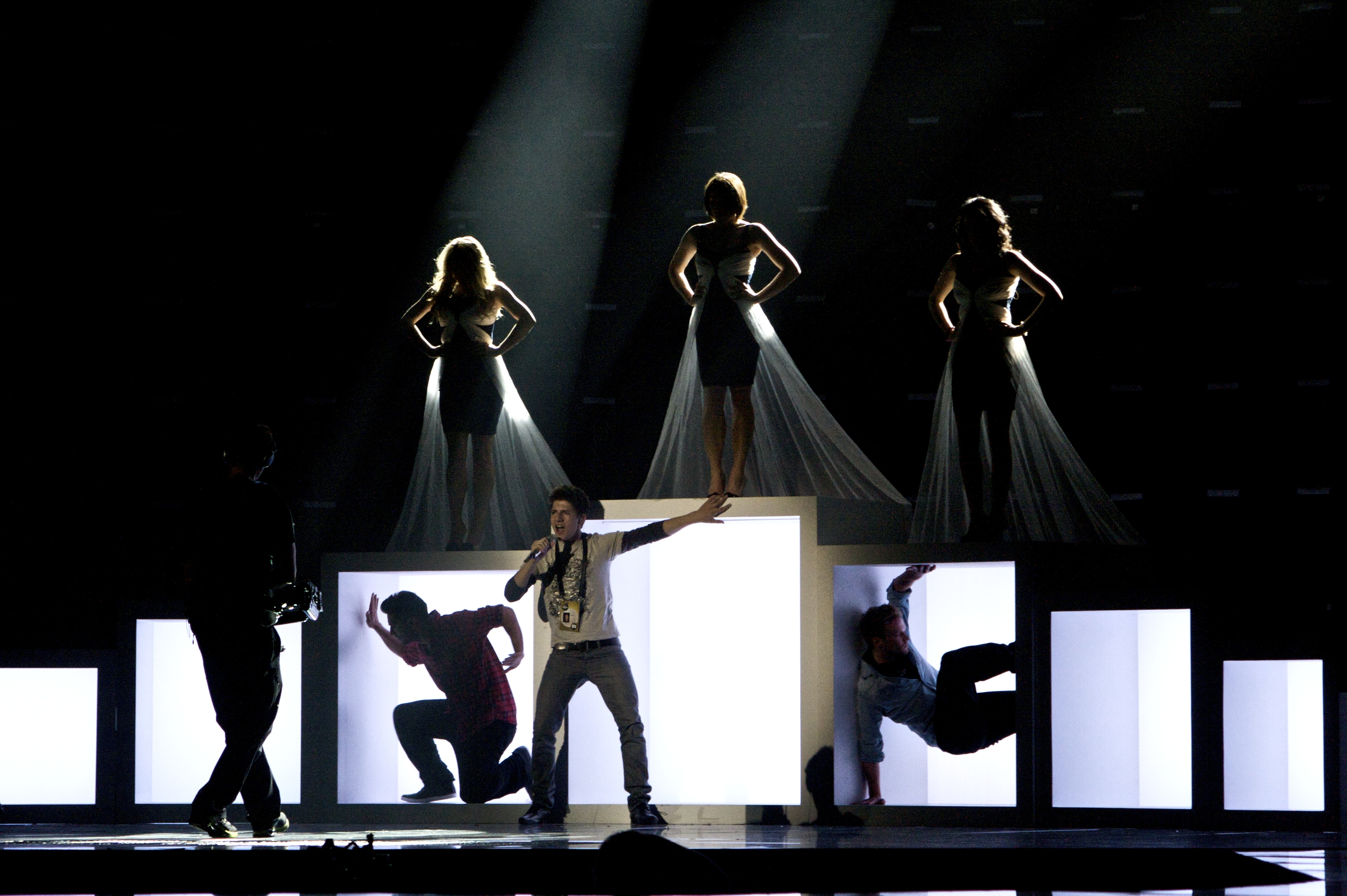
Josh Dubovie during a rehearsal before the final

Josh Dubovie took part in technical rehearsals on 22 and 23 May, followed by dress rehearsals on 28 and 29 May. This included the jury final on 28 May where the professional juries of each country watched and voted on the competing entries. The running order for the semi-finals and final was decided through another draw on 23 March 2010 and the United Kingdom was subsequently placed to perform in position 12, following the entry from Greece and before the entry from Georgia.

The British performance featured Josh Dubovie performing on a multicoloured stage which featured eleven light boxes. Dubovie began the performance by emerging from one of the light boxes in black and white effects, joined by two male dancers and three female backing vocalists. The male performers walked up onto the light boxes during the performance, which was concluded with Dubovie moving back down to the stage and followed by the dancers jumping off the boxes to join Dubovie. The supporting performers that joined Josh Dubovie for the performance were Ciaran Connolly, Filippo Calvagno, Joanna Breheny, Kirsten Joy and Suzanne Carley. The United Kingdom placed twenty-fifth (last) in the final, scoring 10 points.

=== Voting ===
Voting during the three shows consisted of 50 percent public televoting and 50 percent from a jury deliberation. The jury consisted of five music industry professionals who were citizens of the country they represent. This jury was asked to judge each contestant based on: vocal capacity; the stage performance; the song's composition and originality; and the overall impression by the act. In addition, no member of a national jury could be related in any way to any of the competing acts in such a way that they cannot vote impartially and independently.

Following the release of the full split voting by the EBU after the conclusion of the competition, it was revealed that the United Kingdom had placed twenty-fifth (last) with both the public televote and the jury vote. In the public vote, the United Kingdom scored 7 points and in the jury vote the nation scored 18 points.

Below is a breakdown of points awarded to the United Kingdom and awarded by the United Kingdom in the second semi-final and grand final of the contest. The nation awarded its 12 points to Romania in the semi-final and to Greece in the final of the contest.

==== Points awarded to the United Kingdom ====
Points awarded to the United Kingdom (Final)
Score	Country
12 points	
10 points	
8 points	
7 points	
6 points	
5 points	
4 points	Ireland
3 points	Georgia
2 points	Azerbaijan
1 point	Albania

==== Points awarded by the United Kingdom ====
Points awarded by the United Kingdom (Semi-final 2)
Score	Country
12 points	Romania
10 points	Ireland
8 points	Turkey
7 points	Lithuania
6 points	Bulgaria
5 points	Israel
4 points	Cyprus
3 points	Sweden
2 points	Ukraine
1 point	Georgia

Points awarded by the United Kingdom (Final)
Score	Country
12 points	Greece
10 points	Turkey
8 points	Romania
7 points	Ireland
6 points	Denmark
5 points	Ukraine
4 points	Germany
3 points	Israel
2 points	France
1 point	Albania
