= Pearblossom =

Pearblossom may refer to:

- Life Blood (film), a 2009 vampire film which began production under the working title Pearblossom
- Pearblossom, California, an unincorporated town in Los Angeles County, California, U.S.
- The flowers of a pear tree

== See also ==
- Pearblossom Highway, California State Route 138
- Pearblossom Highway #2, a photocollage by David Hockney
- Pear Blossom Run, an annual run/walk event in Medford, Oregon, U.S.
