= Josh James (singer) =

English singer (born 1990)

Josh James Dubovie
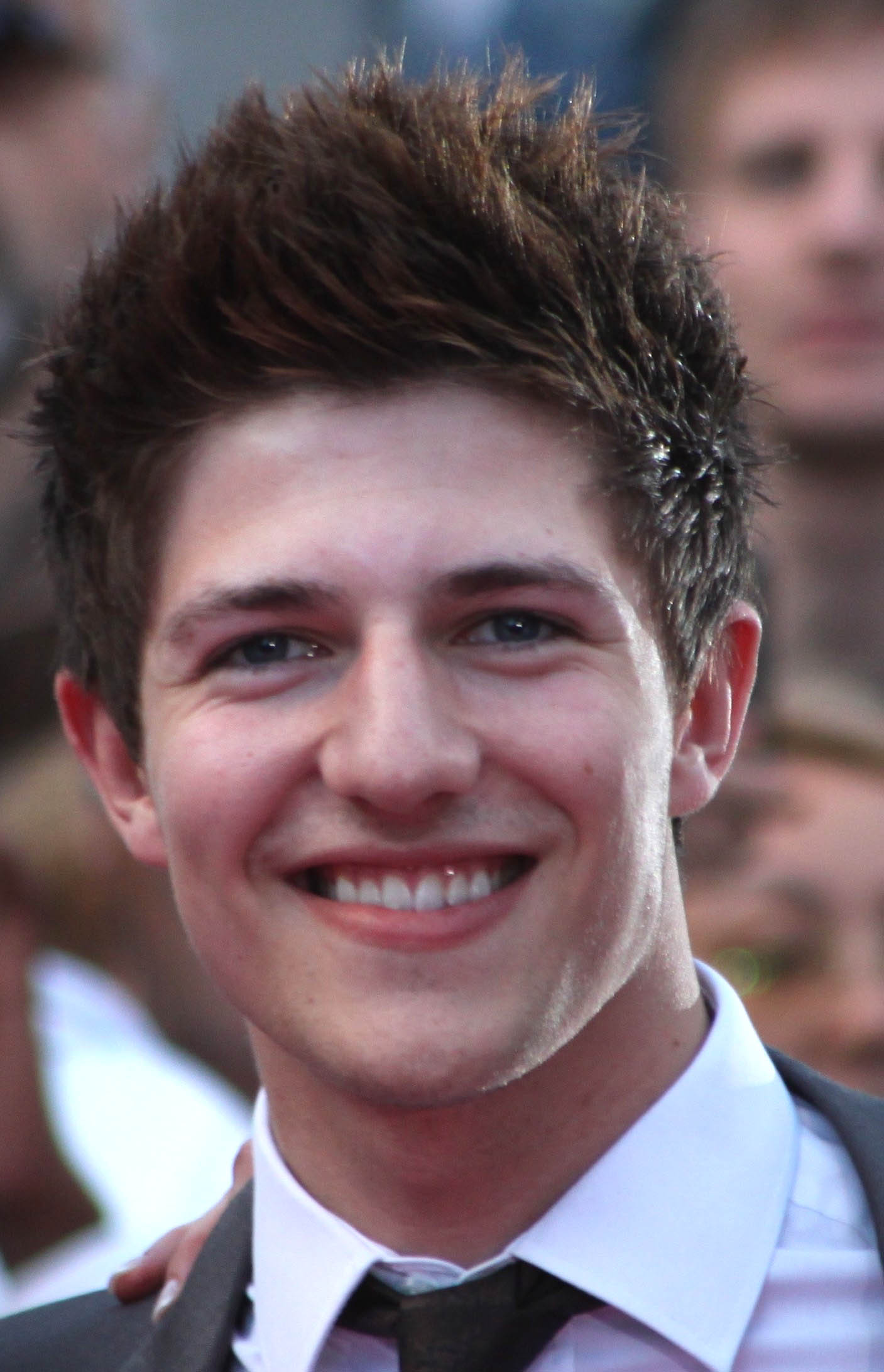
- Dubovie in 2010

Background information
- Born: Josh James Dubovie; 27 November 1990 (age 35); Laindon, Essex, England
- Genres: Pop
- Occupation: Singer
- Instrument: Vocals
- Years active: 2010–2014

Josh James Dubovie (/dʊˈboʊvi/; born 27 November 1990) is an English singer. He represented the United Kingdom at the Eurovision Song Contest 2010 after winning the national selection Eurovision: Your Country Needs You with "That Sounds Good to Me", a song by Mike Stock, Pete Waterman and Steve Crosby.

== Biography ==
=== Early life ===
Dubovie, from Laindon, performed with StageAbility, an after-school stage club, from age nine. At age 15, he played Enjolras in a school production of Les Misérables with the Essex Group. For this role he saw a vocal coach as he had no previous experience of singing. He attended The Billericay School and studied for A levels in Music Technology, Drama and English Literature. In 2008 he won the Blues Idol competition, and has also won Voice of St Lukes contest and Billericay's Got Talent.

Prior to auditioning for Your Country Needs You, he applied for a part on E4 TV series Skins 3rd series and was short-listed for the role of Freddie Mclair.

When Dubovie left school, his father, Richard, decided to manage him and has got him the majority of his professional work.

=== Eurovision ===
On 12 March 2010, Dubovie won Eurovision: Your Country Needs You! with "That Sounds Good to Me". He said, "The minute I heard the song I thought it was a definite winner, I'm so happy I'm going to sing it in Oslo." and "I really believe I can go on to win the Eurovision Song Contest for us." He sang "Too Many Broken Hearts" by Jason Donovan to get into the final three chosen by Waterman, and he also took part in the ABBA medley with the others. After that performance Waterman described his voice as "perfect" while suggesting more "excitement" should be added to his dancing and Tonioli told him he had "an incredible talent". As he represented a "big four" country, Dubovie automatically qualified for the final of the Eurovision Song Contest 2010 on 29 May. Accumulating a total of 10 points during the voting process, Dubovie finished last in the competition.

=== 2010–2011: After Eurovision ===
Dubovie appeared with the 'Proms in the Park' show at Billericay on 24 July 2010. On 18 September, Josh performed alongside Camilla Dallerup and Mark Foster in a fundraising event for St. Francis' Hospice. Supporting local charities, Dubovie was later made celebrity patron of St. Lukes Hospice in Basildon. Shortly after, he appeared as Aladdin in the pantomime Aladdin, alongside David Van Day, Nikki Grahame and Frazer Hines at Lighthouse Theatre, Kettering in December 2010.

In 2011, Dubovie was made a member of the OGAE performing for them in Munich on the weekend of 21 January at their Annual Eurovision party. He released his first album Carpe Diem under Pure Music LTD on 11 February 2011. The album included cover tracks that Dubovie had performed. Shortly after, on 26 February, he entertained the Queen's Royal Lancers at their 'Corporal Mess' at the Catterick Garrison. In the same month, Dubovie guest spotted at the Brentwood Center alongside X factor's Austin Drage, raising over £10,000 for the Essex Air Ambulance.

In March, he performed at the Birmingham Gay Pride Ball, with other guest stars including Jonathan Ansell, Loose Woman Zoe Tyler, Eurovision winners Bucks Fizz and X Factor's Rachel Adedeji.

In August, Dubovie flew to Sweden to perform at the Stockholm Pride Gala, performing with Anders Berglund's 14 piece Orchestra – an orchestrated version of Pete Waterman penned Eurovision song, That sounds good to me. Later that month, Dubovie appeared at the Havering Festival with Stacey Solomon.

September 2011 saw Dubovie headlining at Towngate Theatre in a Help for Heroes charity concert.

In November 2011, Dubovie was recruited by Channel 4 to interview their leading commissioners in front of live audiences as part of an 'Entrepreneurship week'.

Dubovie headlined at the Swindon Arts Center in December 2011 as part of a fundraising event.

=== 2012 ===
In April 2012 he appeared at The Sage, Gateshead at a 'Eurovision Reunited' concert with other past competitors in the competition such as Brotherhood of Man, Bobbysocks!, Black Lace, Johnny Logan and Nicki French.

=== 2013 ===
In March 2013 Dubovie's solo act was rebranded 'Josh James', with his musical style shifting towards RnB and Dance to be more in-line with the current mainstream music trends.

In an October 2013 interview he explained that Internet searches for "Josh Dubovie" produced countless references to Eurovision, so a name change was needed to help him move beyond the contest. "I wanted people to know what I'm doing now," he said. His debut song as Josh James, titled "Game Over", was made available via free download in March 2013. An accompanying music video was released in July 2013.

Dubovie hosted the ESC News 2013 'Heart Campaign', which was broadcast live via online radio. The event saw the première of "Game Over", and featured other performers associated with Eurovision such as Emmelie de Forest (who won the Heart Campaign), plus Annsofi Pettersen & Lys Assia as part of the show's jury.

== Discography ==
=== Albums ===
Title	Album details
Carpe Diem	Released: 11 February 2011; Label: Pure Music; Formats: CD, digital download

=== Singles ===
Year	Single	Peak chart positions		Album
Year	Single	UK	UK Indie	Album
2010	"That Sounds Good to Me"	179	18	Non-album singles
2013	"Game Over"	–	–	Non-album singles
"—" denotes releases that did not chart or were not released.

Preceded by Jade Ewen with "It's My Time"	UK in the Eurovision Song Contest; 2010	Succeeded by Blue with "I Can"
