= Say It Again (Precious song) =

1999 song by Precious

Single by Precious

from the album Precious
- B-side: "Essential Love"
- Released: 17 May 1999
- Length: 2:59
- Label: EMI
- Composer: Paul Varney
- Lyricist: Paul Varney
- Producer: Cutfather & Joe

Precious singles chronology
"Say It Again" (1999)	"Rewind" (2000)

Eurovision Song Contest 1999 entry
- Country: United Kingdom
- Artists: Louise Rose; Anya Lahiri; Kalli Clark-Stemberg; Jenny Frost; Sophie McDonnell
- As: Precious
- Language: English
- Composer: Paul Varney
- Lyricist: Paul Varney

Finals performance
- Final result: 12th
- Final points: 38

Entry chronology
- ◄ "Where Are You?" (1998)
- "Don't Play That Song Again" (2000) ►

"Say It Again" was the United Kingdom's entry for the Eurovision Song Contest 1999, written by Paul Varney and performed by girl band Precious. It was produced by Cutfather & Joe and included on the band's self-titled debut album (2000). "Say It Again" was released as a single in the United Kingdom on 17 May 1999 and peaked at number six on the UK Singles Chart. In July 2000, it was serviced to contemporary hit radio in the United States. It was the last girl group to represent the UK in the contest until 2025.

== At Eurovision ==
The song was performed 5th on the night of the contest, following Croatia's Doris Dragović with "Marija Magdalena" and preceding Slovenia's Darja Švajger with "For a Thousand Years". The song received 38 points, placing 12th in a field of 23, it was one of the four which were omitted from the Eurovision 1999 compilation album as permission to include it had not been obtained. The song was succeeded as UK entry at the 2000 contest by Nicki French with "Don't Play That Song Again".

== Track listings ==
UK CD single

1. "Say It Again" (Cutfather & Joe mix) – 2:59
2. "Say It Again" (James Lavonz full vocal mix) – 4:40
3. "Essential Love" – 3:35
4. "Say It Again" (video version)

UK cassette single

1. "Say It Again" (Cutfather & Joe mix) – 2:59
2. "Say It Again" (James Lavonz full vocal mix) – 4:40
3. "Essential Love" – 3:35

European CD single

1. "Say It Again" (Cutfather & Joe mix) – 2:59
2. "Say It Again" (James Lavonz full vocal mix) – 4:35

== Charts ==
=== Weekly charts ===
Chart (1999)	Peak position
Belgium (Ultratop 50 Flanders)	36
Europe (Eurochart Hot 100)	24
Scottish Singles Sales (Official Charts)	6
Sweden (Sverigetopplistan)	34
UK Singles (Official Charts)	6

=== Year-end charts ===
Chart (1999)	Position
UK Singles (OCC)	115

== Release history ==
Region	Date	Format(s)	Label(s)	Ref(s).
United Kingdom	17 May 1999	CD; cassette	EMI	
United States	25 July 2000	Contemporary hit radio	Capitol	

Preceded by "Where Are You?" by Imaani	United Kingdom in the Eurovision Song Contest; 1999	Succeeded by "Don't Play That Song Again" by Nicki French
