= Jessica Garlick =

Welsh singer (born 1981)

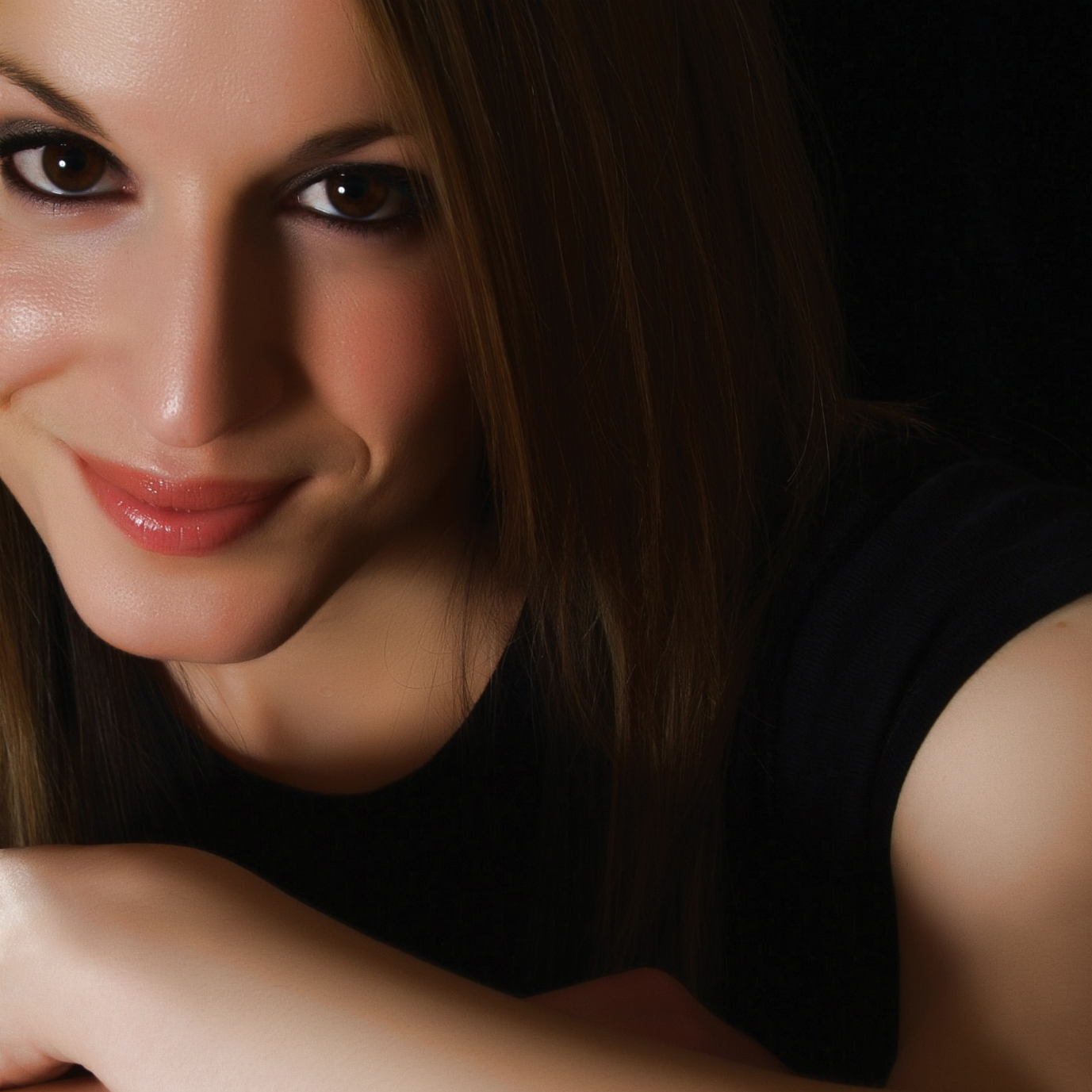
- Jessica Garlick

Background information
- Born: Jessica Julie Anne Garlick; 1981 (age 44–45); Derby, Derbyshire, England
- Origin: Kidwelly, Wales
- Genres: Pop, soul
- Occupation: Singer
- Instrument: Vocals
- Years active: 2001-2002, 2009
- Label: Freedom Records

Jessica Julie Anne Garlick (born 1981) is a Welsh pop singer. Garlick made her first steps into show business when she was 16. At that age, she won the Welsh final of BBC One's talent show Star for a Night. The same year she also featured in Michael Barrymore's My Kind of Music. She is the second-highest placed British entrant at the Eurovision Song Contest in the 21st century, coming joint third in the 2002 contest.

== Early life ==
Garlick was born in Derby, Derbyshire, England. She was educated at Glan-y-Mor Comprehensive School and is a member of the Church of Jesus Christ of Latter-day Saints (LDS Church).

== Career ==
In 2001, she was among the last ten contestants on the ITV talent show Pop Idol. Before appearing on Pop Idol she had been on various TV talent shows including Michael Barrymore's My Kind of Music and Star for a Night.

The BBC later invited her to sing "Come Back", one of the competing songs in A Song for Europe, the British selection for the Eurovision Song Contest 2002. The audience selected her to represent the United Kingdom at the event in Tallinn, where she took her country to its best result since Imaani's "Where Are You?" in 1998, finishing joint third alongside Estonia's representative, Sahlene.

Later in 2002 Garlick was involved in a campaign to help children stop smoking. She made a guest appearance in the 2003 Song for Europe, during which she was charged with announcing the results of the Welsh televote, which handed top marks to the ill-fated Jemini. Later in the year, she appeared in Liquid Eurovision preview and analysis programmes.

On 16 November 2006, Garlick appeared as the hidden musician in the 'Identity Parade' round on the BBC's Never Mind the Buzzcocks game show. She is now married to Owen Satterley, a personal trainer whom she has dated from her teenage years. They have a daughter called Olivia and a son called Noah. The début single from her unreleased album, Hard Not to Fall, was released on 11 May 2009, one day before the first Eurovision Song Contest semi-final. The single was only available to purchase from iTunes. She recorded a music video which was posted on her website. Garlick performed the new single, along with her Eurovision entry, "Come Back", at the UK Eurovision Preview Party, at Scala, King's Cross, on 17 April 2009.

In 2014 she got a job at a primary school in pembridge Herefordshire as a special educational needs specialist and a teaching assistant and music teacher and choir lead she worked there 2014 - 2019

== Chart discography ==
Single	UK
"Come Back" (May 2002)	13

Awards and achievements
Preceded by Lindsay Dracass with "No Dream Impossible"	UK in the Eurovision Song Contest; 2002	Succeeded by Jemini with "Cry Baby"
