= It'll Never Work? =

- Genre: children's, factual
- Presented by: Sally Gray; Jez Nelson; Angela Lamont
- Opening theme: "People Are People"
- Country of origin: United Kingdom
- Original language: English
- No. of series: 7
- No. of episodes: 41

Production
- Running time: 25 min.

Original release
- Network: BBC One
- Release: 9 November 1993 – 23 August 1999

It'll Never Work? is a television programme for children showcasing new inventions and developments in scientific technology. Produced by Roy Milani for BBC Children's, the show ran for seven series between 9 November 1993 and 23 August 1999 on weekdays within the Children's BBC, later CBBC, strand on BBC One. It'll Never Work? was presented throughout its run by children's television presenter Sally Gray, who would go on to present children's quiz 50/50, Jez Nelson, who would go on to front the related primetime BBC technology series Tomorrow's World, and science presenter Angela Lamont. This team was augmented during later series by presenters Adrian Johnson (series 5, 1997) and Rick Adams (series 6, 1998).

For each episode the presenters travelled worldwide to discover new gadgets and to test out whether new inventions worked or not, hence the show's title. In between the main features, spoof adverts would showcase Chindōgu, inventions that solve everyday problems but not in a practical way.

The show was critically and commercially lauded, winning the 1994 BAFTA TV Award in the category of 'Best Children's Programme (Factual)' for Roy Milani, and nominated again in the same category the following year. The series moreover achieved ratings of up to four million viewers.

Depeche Mode's 1984 single "People Are People" was used as the theme music.

== Series ==
There were seven series of It'll Never Work? produced in total, all appearing on BBC One. The first six series each consisted of six episodes of 25 minutes length and were screened as part of Children's BBC's autumn season, running on Tuesday afternoons in the six weeks before school Christmas holidays. The final series in 1999 comprised only five episodes and was screened on Mondays as part of CBBC's line-up for school summer holidays. All episodes premiered in the 4:35pm slot preceding Newsround.

- First series: 9 November – 14 December 1993
- Second series: 8 November – 13 December 1994
- Third series: 7 November – 12 December 1995
- Fourth series: 12 November – 17 December 1996
- Fifth series: 11 November – 16 December 1997
- Sixth series: 17 November – 22 December 1998
- Seventh series: 26 July – 23 August 1999

== Design Awards ==
The third series introduced a competition for young inventors to submit ideas to the It'll Never Work? Design Awards. The first awards ceremony was televised from the Science Museum in London on 17 March 1996, with the judging panel including astronomer Patrick Moore. This segment returned in the same form a year later on 16 March 1997, featuring Kevin Warwick.
