= Sally Gray (presenter) =

Scottish television presenter

Sally Gray MBE
- Born: Sally Jean Gray; June 1968 (age 58); Paisley, Renfrewshire, Scotland
- Occupation: Television presenter
- Years active: 1992–2008
- Children: 2

Sally Jean Gray MBE (born June 1968) is a Scottish television presenter.

== Life and career ==
=== Education and early career ===
Gray earned a BA Degree in Communication and Media Studies from Queen Margaret College in Edinburgh. After graduation Gray began to work behind the scenes at the BBC, and soon after, entered a BBC Journalism course. On this course Gray researched for programmes such as Question Time, Public Eye and BBC Newsroom South East. In 2001, Gray participated in the celebrity special in the fourth season of Fort Boyard alongside Nell McAndrew, Tris Payne, Scott Wright and Keith Duffy. Gray also presented the pilot episode of Channel 4's Scrapheap Challenge.

=== Television presenting ===
Gray began presenting television as a reporter on GMTV. Gray then moved on to lifestyle shows such as ITV's Moving Day in 2004 and Our House, BBC's Real Rooms and The Really Useful Show. Gray presented How to Find a Husband... and What to do if You Can't for UKTV Style in 2006. Since 2007, Gray runs a company called Presenters Inc, with Jonas Hurst, specializing in TV Presenter Training.

=== Children's television ===
As a CBBC entertainment presenter Gray presented shows including 50/50 between 1997 and 2002 and the multi-award-winning It'll Never Work? from 1993 to 1999, and Record Breakers among others.

=== Honours and charity work ===
In 2003, Gray was appointed an MBE for Services to Young People though her work as an Ambassador for the Millennium Volunteers. Gray is also an Ambassador for The Prince's Trust. In 2005, Scotland on Sunday listed her 44th in their '50 Most Eligible Women' feature, then ranked her 19th in 2006. She was bestowed with an honorary degree by Queen Margaret University in 2024.

=== Personal life ===
Gray has been married since August 2009 and has two children.
