= For All We Know (1970 song) =

1970 soft rock song

"For All We Know" is a soft rock song written for the 1970 film Lovers and Other Strangers, with music by Fred Karlin and lyrics by Robb Wilson (Robb Royer) and James Arthur Griffin (Jimmy Griffin), both from the American soft rock group Bread. It was originally performed, for the film's soundtrack, by Larry Meredith and won the Academy Award for Best Original Song in 1971.

The best known version of the song is by American pop duo the Carpenters which reached No. 3 on the US Billboard Hot 100 chart and No. 1 on the US Billboard Easy Listening chart in 1971.

The song was also a hit for Shirley Bassey at the same time in the United Kingdom. It has since been covered by various artists, including Petula Clark.

== The Carpenters version ==
"For All We Know"
- One of artworks for US vinyl single

Single by Carpenters

from the album Carpenters
- B-side: "Don't Be Afraid"
- Released: January 15, 1971
- Recorded: Late 1970
- Genre: Pop
- Length: 2:33
- Label: A&M 1243
- Songwriters: Fred Karlin; Robb Wilson; Arthur James
- Producer: Jack Daugherty

Carpenters singles chronology
"Merry Christmas Darling" (1970)	"For All We Know" (1971)	"Rainy Days and Mondays" (1971)

Richard Carpenter of Carpenters heard the song during an evening of relaxation at the movies while on tour. He decided it would be ideal for the duo. It became a hit for them in 1971, reaching No. 3 on the Billboard Hot 100 singles chart, spending seven weeks in the Top 10, and No. 1 for three weeks on the US easy listening chart. It also became Carpenters' third consecutive top-five single in the Billboard Hot 100.

According to Richard, the intro was originally played on guitar. They had run into José Feliciano in a restaurant, who was a big fan of theirs and wanted to play on one of their records. They went into the studio and the intro was devised by Feliciano, using his nylon string acoustic guitar. The next day, though, Richard got a phone call from Feliciano's manager, demanding that he be removed from the recording. Richard essentially did as requested and replaced Feliciano's guitar intro with that of Earle Dumler's oboe. The other instruments heard on the song were recorded by session musicians later known as the Wrecking Crew.

When the original song was nominated for an Academy Award, the Carpenters were not allowed to perform it at the ceremony because they had not appeared in any film. At their request, the song was performed by British singer Petula Clark.

In 1972, Richard and Karen appeared on Tom Jones's London Bridge Special, where they performed "For All We Know". This version was not released to the public until 2000, with the release of the compilation The Singles: 1969–1981.

=== Personnel ===
- Karen Carpenter – lead and backing vocals
- Richard Carpenter – backing vocals, piano, Hammond organ, Wurlitzer electric piano, orchestration
- Joe Osborn – bass guitar
- Hal Blaine – drums
- Earle Dumler – oboe

=== Charts ===
==== Weekly charts ====
Chart (1971)	Peak position
Australia	10
Canada Top Singles (RPM)	5
Canada Adult Contemporary (RPM)	1
Quebec (ADISQ)	8
New Zealand (Listener)	6
UK Singles (OCC)	18
US Billboard Hot 100	3
US Adult Contemporary (Billboard)	1
US Cash Box Top 100	6
US Radio Active Airplay Singles (Cash Box)	1

==== Year-end charts ====
Chart (1971)	Position
Australia	75
Canada Top Singles (RPM)	69
US Billboard Hot 100	35
US Adult Contemporary (Billboard)	8
US Cash Box Top 100	36

Note

- Released as a double A-side with "Superstar" in the UK

== Shirley Bassey version ==
The song became a hit in the UK for Welsh singer Shirley Bassey in 1971, at the same time as the Carpenters' version, with the two songs competing for chart strength. Bassey's version peaked at No. 6 during a 24-week chart run. It also reached No. 20 in Ireland.

== Petula Clark version ==
British singer, actress, and songwriter Petula Clark gave a heart-rending version of the song during her show at the Albert Hall on February 6, 1983, in tribute to Karen Carpenter, who had died two days before. She had previously recorded a studio version of the song in 1971 for the album, Petula '71.

== Nicki French version ==
"For All We Know"

Single by Nicki French

from the album Secrets
- Released: 1995
- Genre: Disco
- Length: 3:11
- Label: Bags of Fun; Love This
- Songwriters: Fred Karlin; Robb Wilson
- Producers: Mike Stock; Matt Aitken

Nicki French singles chronology
"Total Eclipse of the Heart" (1995)	"For All We Know" (1995)	"Did You Ever Really Loved Me" (1995)

Music video
- "For All We Know" on YouTube

English singer Nicki French released a cover of "For All We Know" in 1995 via labels Bags of Fun and Love This, which was included on her debut album, Secrets (1995). The song peaked at No. 31 in Scotland, No. 42 on the UK Singles Chart and No. 89 in Australia. A music video was also produced to promote the single.

=== Critical reception ===
Steve Baltin from Cash Box wrote, "French follows up her surprise dance hit cover of Bonnie Tyler's 'Total Eclipse of the Heart' by giving the same treatment to the Carpenters' 'For All We Know'. Sounding as if Donna Summer could've done it, 'For All We Know' has a blatant disco feel. Look for this to be a club smash that crosses over to appeal to many of the same fans that made 'Total Eclipse..' a smash." Pan-European magazine Music & Media commented, "Introduce new names through new workings of old songs, that's Bags of Fun's function for parent company Love This. French's second single is a jumpy dance version of a Carpenters hit."

=== Charts ===
==== Weekly charts ====
Chart (1995)	Peak position
Australia (ARIA)	89
Israel (Israeli Singles Chart)	5
Scotland (OCC)	31
UK Singles (OCC)	42
UK Pop Tip Club Chart (Music Week)	2

==== Year-end charts ====
Chart (1995)	Position
UK Pop Tip Club Chart (Music Week)	33

== See also ==
- If I Were a Carpenter (1994)
- List of number-one adult contemporary singles of 1971 (U.S.)
