= Precious (group) =

British girl group (1998–2000)

- Origin: United Kingdom
- Genres: Pop; dance-pop; teen pop
- Years active: 1998–2000
- Labels: EMI
- Past members: Louise Rose; Anya Lahiri; Sophie McDonnell; Kalli Clark-Sternberg; Jenny Frost

Precious was a British girl group consisting of Louise Rose, Anya Lahiri, Sophie McDonnell, Kalli Clark-Sternberg, and Jenny Frost. They first achieved fame as the UK's entry for the Eurovision Song Contest 1999 with their song "Say It Again" and went on to become a moderately popular act until the group disbanded in late 2000.

== Biography ==
Precious was established in late 1998 by friends Sophie McDonnell and Jenny Frost. A set of auditions saw the remaining members join: Anya Lahiri, Kalli Clark-Sternberg and Louise Rose. Rose took up lead vocals.

In March 1999, Precious was voted in to represent the UK at the Eurovision Song Contest in Jerusalem in May 1999. Their song "Say It Again" proved popular and the group signed with EMI to release the song as a single on 17 May. It debuted at No. 6 in the UK singles chart. In the Eurovision Song Contest, Precious did not carry off the grand prix with "Say It Again", sharing the 12th position.

Precious went on to put together their debut self-titled album, working with songwriters and producers such as Cutfather and Joe and Chris Porter. On 20 March 2000 they released their second single "Rewind", which reached No. 11 in the UK. Precious released their third single, "It's Gonna Be My Way", on 26 June 2000 and it reached No. 27. Their final single was "New Beginning". The song failed to make an impact on the UK Singles Chart; it reached No. 50, becoming their only single not to reach the top 40.

The group's self-titled debut album was released 20 November 2000 but failed to chart and the group was dropped by their label. McDonnell later began presenting for BBC TV and Radio including their CBBC brand, Frost replaced Kerry Katona in the group Atomic Kitten, and Lahiri returned to her modelling activities. Lahiri was one of the FHM Pit Girls in 2003, and she started a career as an actress, performing in films like The Grooming with Jacqueline Bisset and Nature Unleashed: Tornado with Daniel Bernhardt, and as a personal trainer. Lead singer Rose has worked with a number of other acts including D'Influence on the song "32 Flavours" in 2002, and Italian producers DB Boulevard on the song "Believe" which reached #8 in Spain and #12 in Italy. She has also become an actress; her credits include the 2008 mini-series Diamonds. Clark-Sternberg has since become a session singer.

== Discography ==
=== Studio albums ===
Title	Album details
Precious	Released 20 November 2000; Label: EMI; Formats: CD, digital download

=== Singles ===
Year	Title	Peak chart positions			Album
Year	Title	UK	BEL (FL)	SWE	Album
1999	"Say It Again"	6	36	34	Precious
2000	"Rewind"	11	—	—	Precious
2000	"It's Gonna Be My Way"	27	—	—	Precious
2000	"New Beginning"	50	—	—	Precious
"—" denotes releases that did not chart or were not released.

=== Music videos ===
Title	Year
"Say It Again"	1999
"Rewind"	1999
"It's Gonna Be My Way"	2000
"New Beginning"	2000

Awards and achievements
Preceded by Imaani with "Where Are You?"	UK in the Eurovision Song Contest; 1999	Succeeded by Nicki French with "Don't Play That Song Again"
