= Don't Play That Song Again =

2000 song by Nicki French

Single by Nicki French
- Released: 2000
- Songwriters: John Springate; Gerry Shephard

Eurovision Song Contest 2000 entry
- Country: United Kingdom
- Artist: Nicki French
- Language: English
- Composers: John Springate; Gerry Shephard
- Lyricists: John Springate; Gerry Shephard

Finals performance
- Final result: 16th
- Final points: 28

Entry chronology
- ◄ "Say It Again" (1999)
- "No Dream Impossible" (2001) ►

"Don't Play That Song Again" is a song written by John Springate and Gerry Shephard, and performed by Nicki French. It represented the United Kingdom in the Eurovision Song Contest 2000. Nicki French was already a well-known name, having had a worldwide hit in 1995 with a cover of Bonnie Tyler's "Total Eclipse of the Heart": on the night she wore a lilac trenchcoat over a bright purple two-piece outfit.

== Background ==
The song's composer John Springate had in 1994 produced French's first recording of "Total Eclipse of the Heart" – which preceded her 1995 hit recording – and Springate had asked French to perform "Don't Play That Song Again" to vie at Song For Europe 2000 where the song came first in a field of four with total televotes of 47,355.

== At Eurovision ==
The scoring for Eurovision 2000 began with "Don't Play that Song Again" receiving a single point from the first reporting jury (that being Israel): subsequently "Don't Play That Song Again" was awarded points by only seven of the twenty-one (not counting the UK) remaining juries with both the Maltese and the Turkish jury responding best to "Don't Play That Song Again" by awarding it six points. At the close of the voting "Don't Play That Song Again" had accrued a vote tally of 28 points to earn sixteenth place in a field of twenty-four – the worst ever result for a UK entry up to that time.

== Charts ==
Chart (2000)	Peak position
Scotland Singles (OCC)	27
UK Singles (OCC)	34

Preceded by "Say It Again" by Precious	United Kingdom in the Eurovision Song Contest; 2000	Succeeded by "No Dream Impossible" by Lindsay Dracass
