= United Kingdom in the Eurovision Song Contest 2002 =

- Eurovision Song Contest 2002
- Participating broadcaster: British Broadcasting Corporation (BBC)
- Country: United Kingdom
- Selection process: A Song for Europe 2002
- Selection date: 3 March 2002

Competing entry
- Song: "Come Back"
- Artist: Jessica Garlick
- Songwriter: Martyn Baylay

Placement
- Final result: 3rd, 111 points

Participation chronology

The United Kingdom was represented at the Eurovision Song Contest 2002 with the song "Come Back", written by Martyn Baylay, and performed by Jessica Garlick. The British participating broadcaster, the British Broadcasting Corporation (BBC), organised a public selection process to determine its entry for the contest, A Song for Europe 2002. Eight acts competed in the national final which consisted of a semi-final and a final, during which the winner was selected entirely through a public televote.

As a member of the "Big Four", the United Kingdom automatically qualified to compete in the final of the Eurovision Song Contest. Performing in position 2, the United Kingdom placed third out of the 24 participating countries with 111 points.

== Background ==
Prior to the 2002 contest, British Broadcasting Corporation (BBC) had participated in the Eurovision Song Contest representing the United Kingdom forty-four times. Thus far, it has won the contest five times: in 1967 with the song "Puppet on a String" performed by Sandie Shaw, in 1969 with the song "Boom Bang-a-Bang" performed by Lulu, in 1976 with "Save Your Kisses for Me" performed by Brotherhood of Man, in 1981 with the song "Making Your Mind Up" performed by Bucks Fizz, and in 1997 with the song "Love Shine a Light" performed by Katrina and the Waves. To this point, the nation is noted for having finished as the runner-up in a record fifteen contests. Up to and including 1998, it had only twice finished outside the top 10, in 1978 and in 1987. Since 1999, the year in which the rule was abandoned that songs must be performed in one of the official languages of the country participating, the UK has had less success, having yet to finish within the top ten. In 2001, "No Dream Impossible" performed by Lindsay Dracass finished in fifteenth place out of twenty-three competing entries.

As part of its duties as participating broadcaster, the BBC organises the selection of its entry in the Eurovision Song Contest and broadcasts the event in the country. The broadcaster announced that it would participate in the 2002 contest on 13 August 2001. The BBC has traditionally organised a national final featuring a competition among several artists and songs to choose its entry for Eurovision. For its 2002 entry, the broadcaster announced that a national final involving a public vote would be held to select the entry.

== Before Eurovision ==
=== A Song for Europe 2002 ===
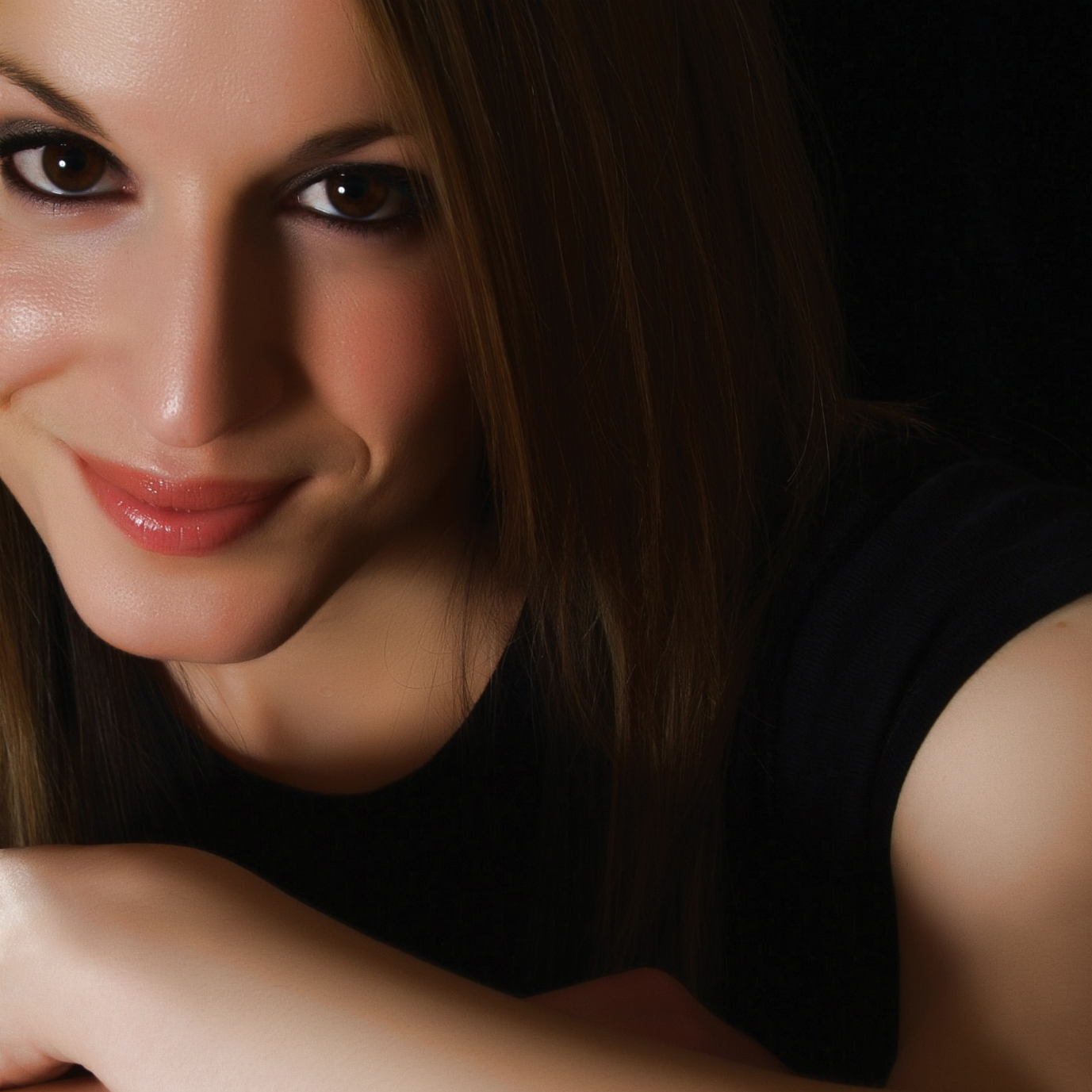
Jessica Garlick represented the United Kingdom after winning A Song for Europe 2002

A Song for Europe 2002 was the national final developed by the BBC in order to select its entry for the Eurovision Song Contest 2002. Eight acts competed in the competition which consisted of a radio semi-final on 1 February 2002 and a televised final on 3 March 2002. The semi-final was broadcast on BBC Radio 2, while the final was broadcast on BBC One.

==== Competing entries ====
On 31 July 2001, BBC together with the British Academy of Songwriters, Composers and Authors (BASCA) announced an open submission for interested songwriters to submit their songs. All composers and lyricists were required to be British citizens or residents in the United Kingdom for three years prior to the Eurovision Song Contest 2002. A fee was also imposed on songs being submitted to the national final: £47 for BASCA members, £70.5 for non-BASCA members and £11.75 for songwriters under the age of 17 by 1 May 2002. The submission period lasted until 19 October 2001. More than 550 received submissions were reviewed by various panels of music publishers, songwriters and record label professionals, following which a 20-song shortlist was compiled by BASCA and presented to the BBC which ultimately selected eight semi-finalists to compete in the national final in December 2001. The eight competing songs were premiered during The Ken Bruce Show and Wake Up to Wogan on BBC Radio 2 between 28 and 31 January 2002.

==== Semi-final ====
Eight acts competed in the radio semi-final which was hosted by Terry Wogan and Ken Bruce during Wake Up to Wogan on 1 February 2002. A public vote consisting of televoting and online voting, which registered over 20,000 votes, selected the top four songs that proceeded to the final. Before the semi-final, the public was able to cast their votes online starting from 28 January 2002.

On 6 February 2002, the BBC announced that one of the finalists, "Never in a Million Years" performed by Zee, had been disqualified as the song was published on a compilation album in Hungary in June 2001. "Every Step of the Way" performed by Level Best, which came fifth in the semi-final, was selected as the replacement finalist. Another semi-finalist, "Lovestruck" performed by Honey Trap, was also set to be discussed by the BBC regarding a potential disqualification as it was claimed to be almost identical to a song with the same title, performed by Swedish singer Kinnda. The song was eventually not disqualified as it was ultimately eliminated from the semi-final.

Semi-final – 1 February 2002
R/O	Artist	Song	Songwriter(s)	Result
1	Honey Trap	"Lovestruck"	Ben Copland; Yvonne John Lewis; Nicky Cooke; Phil Dane	—N/a
2	~~Zee~~	~~"Never in a Million Years"~~	Mark Jiggens; Zee Asha	Disqualified
3	Paula O'Neil	"When You're Around"	Ben Copland; Martin Bushell	—N/a
4	Pulse	"Fade Away"	Stuart Hanna; Alistair Griffin	—N/a
5	Surf 'n' Turf	"I Give In"	Jonathan Maitland; Jackie Collins; Peter Maitland	Qualified
6	Level Best	"Every Step of the Way"	Graham Kearns; Howard New	Qualified
7	Tricia Penrose	"DJ Romeo"	Bea Eden; Simon Stirling; James Gordon	Qualified
8	Jessica Garlick	"Come Back"	Martyn Baylay	Qualified

==== Final ====
Four acts competed in the televised final on 3 March 2002 which was held at the BBC Elstree Centre in Borehamwood, Hertfordshire and hosted by Claire Sweeney and Christopher Price. A public televote selected the winner, "Come Back" performed by Jessica Garlick. The televote in the final registered 107,298 votes.

Final – 3 March 2002
R/O	Artist	Song	Votes	Place
1	Level Best	"Every Step of the Way"	8,927	3
2	Tricia Penrose	"DJ Romeo"	28,681	2
3	Surf 'n' Turf	"I Give In"	1,892	4
4	Jessica Garlick	"Come Back"	67,798	1

== At Eurovision ==
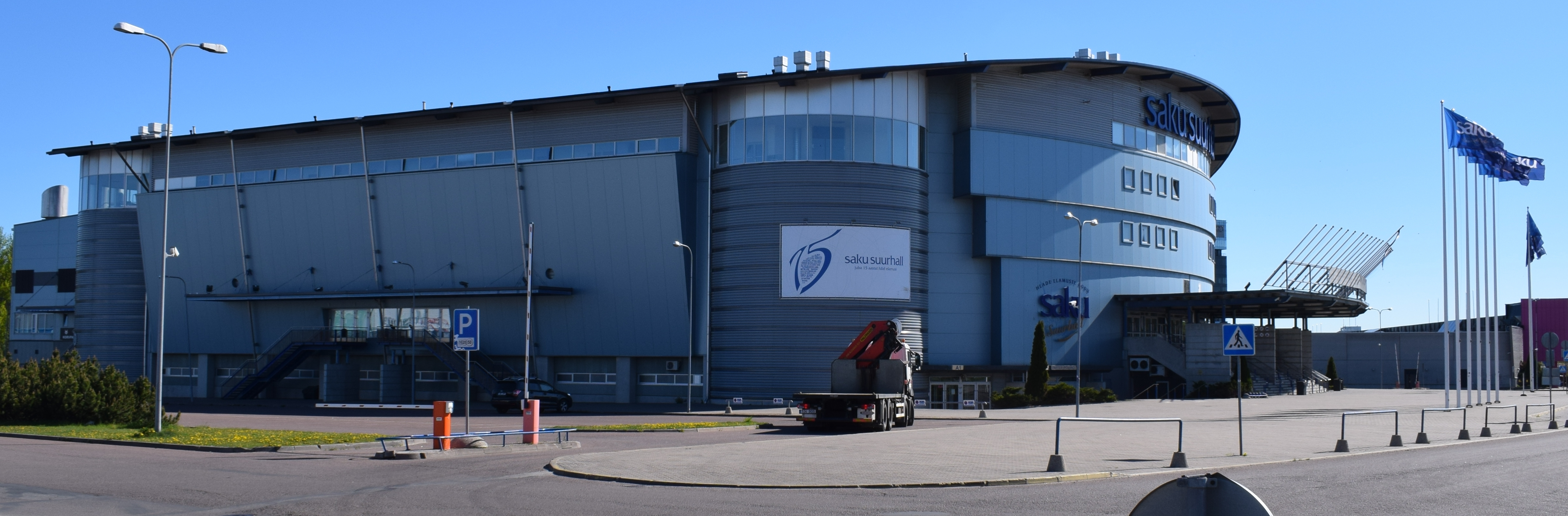
The Eurovision Song Contest 2002 took place at Saku Suurhall in Tallinn, Estonia.

The Eurovision Song Contest 2002 took place at Saku Suurhall in Tallinn, Estonia, on 25 May 2002. The participants list included the previous year's winning country, the "Big Four" countries (France, Germany, Spain and the United Kingdom), the sixteen highest-scoring participating countries in the previous year's contest and any non-participating countries in the previous year's contest, up to 24 participants in total. As a member of the "Big Four", the United Kingdom automatically qualified to compete in the contest. On 9 November 2001, an allocation draw was held which determined the running order and the United Kingdom was set to perform in position 2, following the entry from Cyprus and before the entry from Austria. The United Kingdom finished in third place scoring 111 points.

In the United Kingdom, the contest was televised on BBC One with commentary by Terry Wogan, on BBC Choice with commentary by Jenny Eclair, and on BBC Radio 2 with commentary by Ken Bruce. Christopher Price was initially announced as the commentator on BBC Choice (as part of the programme Liquid Eurovision Party, a spin-off of the Liquid News programme fronted by Price), however he was replaced by Eclair following his death a month before the contest.

=== Voting ===
Below is a breakdown of points awarded to the United Kingdom and awarded by the United Kingdom in the contest. The nation awarded its 12 points to Malta in the contest. The BBC appointed Colin Berry as its spokesperson to announce the results of the British televote during the show.

Points awarded to the United Kingdom
Score	Country
12 points	Austria
10 points	Malta
8 points	Finland; Germany; Lithuania; Slovenia
7 points	Bosnia and Herzegovina; Greece
6 points	Belgium; Denmark; Estonia; Switzerland
5 points	Israel; Latvia
4 points	Macedonia
3 points	
2 points	Sweden; Turkey
1 point	France

Points awarded by the United Kingdom
Score	Country
12 points	Malta
10 points	France
8 points	Latvia
7 points	Estonia
6 points	Slovenia
5 points	Israel
4 points	Belgium
3 points	Cyprus
2 points	Spain
1 point	Sweden
