= Anya Lahiri =

- Born: Anya Lahiri; 1 May 1982 (age 44); Golders Green, London, England
- Genre: Pop
- Occupations: Actress; model; singer; fitness instructor
- Years active: 1998–present

Anya Lahiri (born 1 May 1982) is an English actress, model, singer and fitness instructor who is of Indian and Finnish origin.

== Biography ==
Born in Golders Green, London of Indian and Finnish origin, Lahiri attended the Henrietta Barnett School in Hampstead Garden Suburb, where she excelled in languages and music. She graduated from Birkbeck, University of London with a degree in humanities and literature in 2005.

Anya Lahiri is married to James Macaskill and they have a son.

== Career ==
=== Modelling and singing ===
Lahiri was scouted in Covent Garden at age 14 by Select Model Management in London. She was sent on an audition for what she thought was a music video which turned out to be an audition for a musical group. At first, she was reluctant to audition but changed her mind. She performed All Saints' "Never Ever" and was chosen to become a part of the girl group Precious. The band was chosen by British viewers to represent the UK in the 1999 Eurovision Song Contest with their first single, "Say It Again", and arrived 12th. After that, they released their first album, called Precious, which yielded two Top 10 hit singles: "Rewind" and "It's Gonna Be My Way". In the summer of 2000, the band tried to enter the United States market. In November 2000, they released their last single, called "New Beginning", with a video clip set in an industrial warehouse with the girl band acting like tough girls. By the end of 2000, the group went under scrutiny and the members decided it was time to stop.

Following the breakup of Precious, Lahiri returned to her education, attending Birkbeck, University of London, while continuing to model. During this time, she has modelled for brands such as Asda and ASOS as well as gracing the covers of Company and More. She was one of the FHM PitGirls in 2003.

=== Acting ===
In 2003, Lahiri landed her first acting role alongside Sienna Miller in Keen Eddie. Miller advised Lahiri what acting classes to take and which reputable agencies she should try to have represent her. In 2004, she appeared in the movie Tornado with Daniel Bernhardt, and in The Grooming with Jacqueline Bisset. By 2005, she finished her studies in humanities and literature and was free to pursue her interest in acting full-time.

In 2006, Lahiri moved to Los Angeles, where she focused on becoming an actress. Being an established model, Lahiri signed with Next Models and became the face of the Anna Beth's jewels new collection. That same year, she starred in I Can't Think Straight.

By 2007, Lahiri moved back to London, where she appeared in five episodes of Dream Team as Emma. Following that, she filmed Daylight Robbery and Goal! 3: Taking on the World.

In 2009, Lahiri focused on modeling; she was signed to agencies such as Models 1 in London, Next Models in Los Angeles, and MC2 Models in Tel Aviv. She was featured in editorials for She] magazine as well as landing a campaign for Poule de Luxe. She also appeared in The Scar Crow and Life Blood.

In 2010, she made the short film The Commuter, which was filmed entirely on the Nokia N8 in HD. She had a small part in Swinging with the Finkels and played Maddie in Meet Pursuit Delange, a short film.

In 2011, Lahiri starred opposite Adrien Brody in a Super Bowl advertisement for Stella Artois.

=== Barry's Boot Camp ===
Lahiri works at Barry's Boot Camp as a fitness instructor. She plays an integral role in the establishment of Barry's Boot Camp in London. Today, she splits her time among modelling, acting, and being a fitness instructor.

== Filmography ==
- Nature Unleashed: Tornado (2004)
- Keen Eddie (2004)
- The Fine Art of Love: Mine Ha-Ha (2005)
- I Can't Think Straight (2007)
- Goal! 3: Taking on the World (2009)
- The Scar Crow (2009)
- Life Blood (2009)
