= No Dream Impossible =

2001 song by Lindsay Dracass

Single by Lindsay Dracass
- Released: 2001
- Songwriters: Russ Ballard; Chris Winter

Eurovision Song Contest 2001 entry
- Country: United Kingdom
- Artist: Lindsay Dracass
- Language: English
- Composers: Russ Ballard; Chris Winter
- Lyricists: Russ Ballard; Chris Winter

Finals performance
- Final result: 15th
- Final points: 28

Entry chronology
- ◄ "Don't Play That Song Again" (2000)
- "Come Back" (2002) ►

"No Dream Impossible" is a song written by Russ Ballard and Chris Winter and performed by Lindsay Dracass. It represented the United Kingdom in the Eurovision Song Contest 2001.

The song was performed 16th on the night of the contest, following Turkey's Sedat Yüce with "Sevgiliye son" and preceding Slovenia's Nuša Derenda with "Energy". The song received 28 points, placing 15th in a field of 23.

The song, which reached No. 32 on the UK Singles Chart, was succeeded as UK entry at the 2002 contest by Jessica Garlick with "Come Back".

== Charts ==
Chart (2001)	Peak position
UK Singles (OCC)	32

Preceded by "Don't Play That Song Again" by Nicki French	United Kingdom in the Eurovision Song Contest; 2001	Succeeded by "Come Back" by Jessica Garlick
