= That Sounds Good to Me =

2010 single by Josh Dubovie

Single by Josh Dubovie
- Released: 24 May 2010
- Recorded: 2010
- Genre: Europop
- Length: 3:00
- Label: Saw Productions
- Songwriter(s): Pete Waterman; Mike Stock; Steve Crosby

Music video
- "That Sounds Good to Me" on YouTube

Eurovision Song Contest 2010 entry
- Country: United Kingdom
- Artist(s): Josh Dubovie
- Language: English
- Composer(s): Pete Waterman; Mike Stock; Steve Crosby
- Lyricist(s): Pete Waterman; Mike Stock; Steve Crosby

Finals performance
- Final result: 25th
- Final points: 10

Entry chronology
- ◄ "It's My Time" (2009)
- "I Can" (2011) ►

"That Sounds Good to Me" is a song written and composed by Pete Waterman, Mike Stock and Steve Crosby that finished last when it represented the United Kingdom at the Eurovision Song Contest 2010 held in Oslo, Norway. The song and performer was revealed as Josh Dubovie on 12 March 2010 who won Eurovision: Your Country Needs You.

== Background ==
=== Writing ===
The song was initially written by Pete Waterman and Mike Stock before even the gender of the singer had been chosen. It was only revealed to the public on 29 January 2010 that Pete Waterman would write the song. On 19 February the BBC confirmed that Mike Stock would join his Stock Aitken Waterman partner in co-writing the song. Steve Crosby was also accredited as a joint lyricist and composer at the Eurovision Song Contest on 29 May 2010.

=== Singer selection process ===
To select the singer the British public voted for three different renditions of the song on Eurovision: Your Country Needs You on 12 March 2010. This followed the same process as the previous year, where multiple acts performed "It's My Time", composed by Andrew Lloyd Webber and Dianne Warren. Two male singers, Alexis Gerred and Josh Dubovie, and one female singer, Esma Akkilic, performed "That Sounds Good to Me" individually. The public chose Josh Dubovie's performance as their favourite.

=== Redevelopment of the song ===
The version of "That Sounds Good to Me" performed on the selection show was not the version that was later performed in Oslo, as it was revamped to complement Dubovie's voice more effectively. Stock suggested that any criticisms that had been voiced about the song would be looked at when preparing the final version.

The radio single was presented on the 29 April 2010 and premièred on Ken Bruce's show on BBC Radio 2. It was released on 24 May 2010.

=== Promotion ===
The final version of the song was first performed in the early hours of 25 April in Amsterdam. He was later interviewed and performed the song on Life4You on Dutch TV. He also has performed at UKeurovision Preview Party on 2 May.

There was also a campaign on Facebook to get "That Sounds Good To Me" to number one in the United Kingdom during the week of the Eurovision Song Contest 2010. The effort proved unsuccessful, however, with the song entering the UK Singles Charts at number 179 on 5 June 2010.

=== Choreography and rehearsals ===
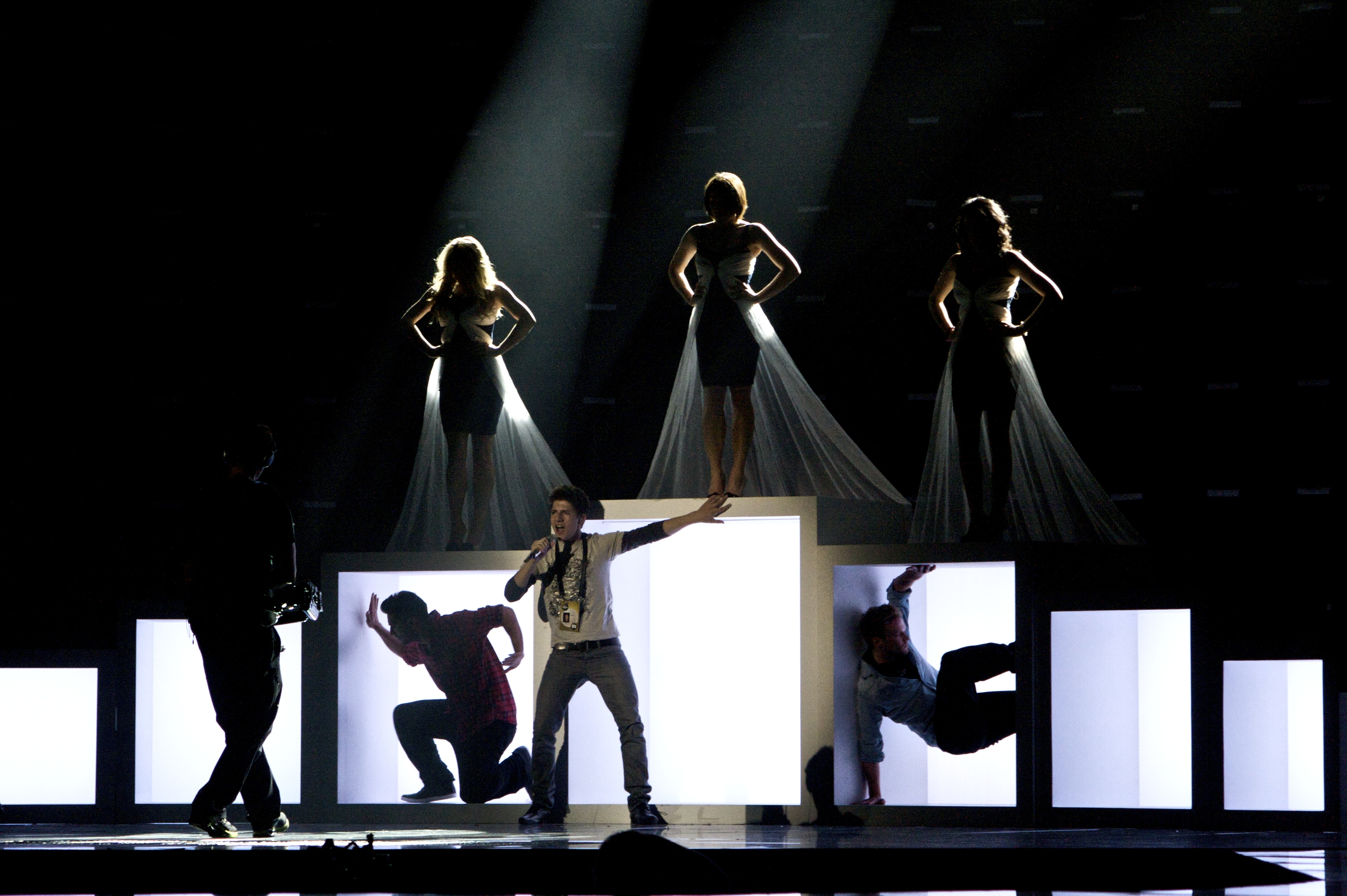
Dubovie rehearsing; the three female backing vocalists with silk trails are on the boxes with two male dancers in the boxes.

During April Dubovie worked with choreographers, set designers, backing vocalists and dancers to create the "Director's Tape", which was used in Norway for camera movements. Frank Strachan was hired to handle Dubovie's styling. On 15 April Dubovie was due to visit the Norwegian Embassy in London where he was to meet the Ambassador and Norway's 2010 act Didrik Solli-Tangen. Dubovie would be travelling around Europe to promote the UK's 2010 song. On the 22 April 2010 a Swedish radio station played a studio version of the song, however the BBC have stated on their Eurovision website, that the live final version would debut in a Preview Party in Amsterdam in April.

=== Eurovision ===
The song finished last place in the final with a total of 10 points. This result made it the third time that the United Kingdom has finished last in the contest, the other two being Jemini in 2003 and Andy Abraham in 2008.

The song received 4 points from Ireland, 3 points from Georgia, 2 points from Azerbaijan, and 1 point from Albania.

== Critical reception ==
Reception to the first version of the song was negative. Michael Deacon writing in The Daily Telegraph called it naff and Alex Hardy in The Times, übernaff, while Pete Paphides writing for Times Online called it the pop equivalent of re-processed meat, suggesting it sounded like Rick Astley and Jason Donovan songs from over 20 years ago. In the days leading up to the contest, William Hill were offering 125-1 odds of the song winning, the longest odds ever for a UK entry.

The song was revamped in light of the chosen singer and its initial reception. Bill Lamb described the video released to accompany the revamped song as chipper and cheerful.

As part of a marketing campaign for the World Cup, Puma recorded football fans from the UK, France, Germany, and Italy singing one of their country's Eurovision entries as a football chant. That Sounds Good to Me was the song chanted by England fans, the French fans chanted Allez Ola Olé, the Germans chanted Ein bißchen Frieden the 1982 Eurovision winner and the Italians chanted to Fiumi di parole.

== Charts ==
"That Sounds Good to Me" was released on 24 May 2010 in the United Kingdom as a digital download only. The single only managed to peak at #179 on the UK Top 200 giving it the distinction of being the lowest charting UK Eurovision entry to date, with the exception of the 1964 entry which failed to chart at all (albeit the chart was only a top 50 at the time). It also joins a small list of entries that failed to make the official UK Top 75 the most recent being the 1986 and 1987 entries which peaked at #98 and #96 respectively.

Chart (2010)	Peak Position
UK Indie Chart	18
UK Singles Chart	179

== Release history ==
Region	Date	Label	Format
United Kingdom	29 April 2010	Saw Productions	Radio single
United Kingdom	24 May 2010	Saw Productions	Digital download
