= Secrets (Nicki French album) =

Studio album by Nicki French
- Released: 20 June 1995 (US); 2002 (Nightcore version)
- Genre: Eurodance
- Label: Critique Records
- Producer: Mike Stock; Matt Aitken; Dave Ford

Nicki French chronology
| Secrets (1995) | French Revolution (1998) |

Professional ratings
Review scores
| Source | Rating |
|---|---|
| AllMusic | 4.5/5 stars |

Secrets is the debut album by English singer Nicki French, released on 20 June 1995 in the U.S. The album is primarily dance-focused and features two cover songs: "Total Eclipse of the Heart" (originally recorded and released by Bonnie Tyler) and "For All We Know" (originally recorded by The Carpenters). "Total Eclipse of the Heart" became French's biggest hit single, reaching No. 5 in the UK Singles Chart and No. 2 on the US Billboard Hot 100.

For its release in Japan in 1997, the album was retitled Total Eclipse of the Heart after its lead track. Extra tracks were also added to the Japanese version.

== Track listing ==
1. "Total Eclipse of the Heart"
2. "Did You Ever Really Love Me?"
3. "Forever and a Day"
4. "I'll Be Waiting"
5. "Is There Anybody Out There?"
6. "Never in a Million Years"
7. "For All We Know"
8. "Secrets"
9. "Something About You"
10. "Voice of America"

=== Japanese bonus tracks ===
1. "Pride and Passion"
2. "Total Eclipse of the Heart" (Mobius Loop Mix)
3. "Did You Ever Really Love Me?" (Big Apple)
4. "For All We Know" (The Freddy Edit)
5. "Think It Over"

== Charts ==
| Chart (1995) | Peak position |
|---|---|
| Australia (ARIA) | 95 |
| US (Billboard 200) | 151 |
| Japan Oricon | 39 |
