= Life Blood (film) =

- Directed by: Ron Carlson
- Produced by: Ron Carlson; Chris Lytton; Rachel North
- Starring: Sophie Monk; Anya Lahiri; Scout Taylor-Compton; Electra Avellan; Patrick Renna; Charles Napier; Angela Lindvall; Danny Woodburn; Tava Smiley
- Cinematography: Marc Carter
- Edited by: Richard Hackney
- Music by: John D'Andrea
- Release dates: November 27, 2009 (Germany); April 27, 2010 (United States)
- Running time: 85 minutes
- Country: United States
- Language: English

Life Blood is a 2009 American supernatural horror film directed and produced by Ron Carlson.

== Plot ==
On New Year's Eve 1968, lesbian couple Brooke and Rhea encounter the Creator of the Universe while driving on the Pearblossom Highway as they leave a party, after Brooke killed a rapist. The women are laid to rest for 40 years and awaken as vampires on New Year's Day 2009 .

Instructed to devour evil and thereby gain eternal life, the story portrays their first 24 hours of survival as vampiric creatures. Brooke starts to go on a killing spree to prove herself loyal to the Creator, while Rhea tries to put a stop to the chaos that Brooke started after she kills a sheriff, his deputies, a married couple on vacation, and a hitch-hiker.

When Brooke prefers to devour good souls instead of evil souls, Rhea kills Brooke by impaling her with a stop sign. Rhea decides to start her vampire life all over again after telling her story to Lizzy, not knowing that Brooke is still alive, presumably plotting her revenge.

== Cast ==
- Sophie Monk as Brooke Anchel
- Anya Lahiri as Rhea Cohen
- Patrick Renna as Dan Griggs
- Justin Shilton as Warren James
- Scout Taylor-Compton as Carrie Lain
- Charles Napier as Sheriff Tillman
- Danny Woodburn as Deputy Felix Shoe
- Marshall Manesh as Steve
- Angela Lindvall as God/the Waitress
- Electra Avellan as Lizzy
- Gina Gallego as Patricia
- Jennifer Tung as Officer Cook
- Stephen Taylor as Tim
- Stephanie Hodes as Jenny
- Mark Hodos as Bill
- Chris Payne Gilbert as the hitchhiker
- Tava Smiley as herself
- Kimberly Willess as Champagne girl
- Hank Braxtan as Bartender
- Franklin Ruehl as Partygoer
- Mario Sellitti as Party Guest
- Ana Therese Lopez as Party Guest
- Drew Adams as Party guest
- Andrea Rueda as Party Guest
- Richard Hackney as Party Guest
- Carla Glover as Party Guest
- Charlie Franceschi as Party Guest

== Production ==
Pearblossom began production in late May 2007, was than renamed Murder World.

== Release ==
Originally titled Pearblossom, it was renamed Life Blood for the DVD release, which came out on 27 April 2010 through Lionsgate in the USA.

== Background ==
It features actress Scout Taylor-Compton, known for portraying Laurie Strode in the horror film remake Halloween, and Electra Avellan who previously appeared in Grindhouse with her twin sister. Taylor-Compton has gone on to say that her appearance is not a starring role, but a cameo.

== Soundtrack ==
The film features music performed by Nicole Chase, including the song "Understanding the Universe" heard during the end credits but not credited.
