= 50/50 (British game show) =

British children's game show

- The "pill" logo used from Series 2 onwards. The original logo consisted of two bubbles arranged diagonally in the manner of a "%" sign.
- Genre: Children's game show
- Presented by: Sally Gray; Angellica Bell; Sophie McDonnell
- Narrated by: Matthew Davies; Gary Martin; Dave Kelly
- Country of origin: United Kingdom
- Original language: English
- No. of series: 9
- No. of episodes: 118 (inc. 4 Christmas specials)

Production
- Running time: 25 minutes
- Production company: BBC Scotland

Original release
- Network: BBC One (1997–2001; 2003–05); CBBC Channel (2002)
- Release: 7 April 1997 – 12 July 2005

50/50 is a British children's television game show for BBC television. It was first broadcast on 7 April 1997 and ended its run on 12 July 2005 after 9 series. Repeats aired on BBC One, BBC Two and the CBBC channel until 2009.

Sally Gray hosted the show from its inception until 2002, followed by Angellica Bell until 2004 and Sophie McDonnell in 2005. The voice of the show's computer, named 'Flynn', was provided by Matthew Davies between 1998 and 2000, then by Gary Martin in 2001 and finally by Dave Kelly from 2002 to 2005.

The show featured a competition contested by two teams, each represented by schools, of fifty 11- and 12-year-old pupils who were randomly selected to take part in physical games and quiz rounds to score points. In addition, all players voted in 'true or false' questions to observational rounds. In most series, prizes were awarded to both schools, but a trophy was awarded to the winning team from series 5 onwards.

== Format ==
The contestants were also the studio audience and sat in raised seating on opposite sides of the studio. The two schools competing were originally represented by the T-shirt colours orange and green before they changed to blue and yellow for the rest of the show's run from the second series in 1998. The contestant numbers were randomly selected, each used once only, for both teams (occasionally one team only) and announced and displayed by a large-screened computer named 'Flynn'. The physical games usually consisted of inflatable obstacle courses, similar to those found in other children's game shows such as Get Your Own Back, Fun House, Run the Risk and Pump It Up. Quiz rounds also featured, as well as an observational round featuring a pop music video in which all contestants played by voting 'true' or 'false' on keypads.

The winning team won a prize for their school, and in later series a glass trophy.

== Transmissions ==
=== Series ===
Series	Start date	End date	Episodes
1	7 April 1997	16 June 1997	9
2	6 April 1998	3 August 1998	13
3	12 April 1999	26 July 1999	13
4	3 April 2000	17 July 2000	13
5	2 April 2001	16 July 2001	13
6	25 March 2002	12 April 2002	13
6	27 May 2002*		13
7	31 March 2003	8 July 2003	14
8	6 April 2004	13 July 2004	15
9	5 April 2005	12 July 2005	15

- Series 6, Episode 6 was postponed from its original CBBC Channel broadcast. It eventually premiered during BBC1's Children's programming block on 27 May 2002.

=== Christmas Specials ===
Date
28 December 1998
26 December 1999
25 December 2000
26 December 2001
