= Come Back (Jessica Garlick song) =

2002 song by Jessica Garlick

Single by Jessica Garlick
- Released: 2001
- Songwriter: Martyn Baylay

Eurovision Song Contest 2002 entry
- Country: United Kingdom
- Artist: Jessica Garlick
- Language: English
- Composer: Martyn Baylay
- Lyricist: Martyn Baylay

Finals performance
- Final result: 3rd (joint)
- Final points: 111

Entry chronology
- ◄ "No Dream Impossible" (2001)
- "Cry Baby" (2003) ►

"Come Back" is a single released by Welsh pop singer Jessica Garlick. It represented the United Kingdom in the Eurovision Song Contest 2002.

== Background ==
=== Composition ===
The song was written by Martyn Baylay then an airline pilot from Birmingham who prior to "Come Back" had made seven unsuccessful attempts to place a composition in the UK national preselection round for Eurovision, also known as A Song for Europe. Baylay would recall: "I had always tried to deliberately write a song for the Contest, I would try anything to get in, I studied form so to speak and tried to create the perfect contest song. None of this was successful, so when I thought I don't care about formula any more, I sent in 'Come Back' and it won." The demo of "Come Back" submitted to the BBC to consider for A Song for Europe featured vocalist Bernie Nolan.

=== A Song for Europe ===
After "Come Back" had been selected as one of the eight Song for Europe 2002 finalists, the BBC's Eurovision executive producer Kevin Bishop contacted the station's Music & Media Partnership managing director Rick Blaskey who'd recall Bishop advising him that "Come Back" "was written by a pilot from Birmingham who doesn't know anyone in the business and needs some help". Blaskey said of "Come Back": "my favourite song in the competition, so the next day I met the writer and contacted [Atomic Kitten producers] Bill Padley and Jeremy Godfrey. They said exactly what I said, that this was a potential winner." Blaskey had the idea of having a Pop Idol contestant perform the song and on learning that Jessica Garlick had stated a longtime ambition to compete at Eurovision she was recruited: Garlick would recall: It... all happened so quickly, I got the phone call on Monday [21 January 2002] and recorded the song on Wednesday." "Come Back" was announced as the UK entrant for Eurovision 2002 following the March 3 television broadcast of A Song for Europe 2002 on 3 March 2002, Garlick's performance of the song having solicited 68,000 televotes—40,000 more than second place.

=== At Eurovision 2002 ===
==== Performance ====
On the night of the Eurovision competition, held on 25 May 2002 at the Saku Suurhall Arena in Tallinn, Estonia, "Come Back" was performed second, following Cyprus' One with "Gimme" and preceding Austria's Manuel Ortega with "Say a Word". For her Eurovision appearance, Garlick wore a dark red gown which was shredded from the waist down. She was accompanied on stage by five backing singers dressed in white.

==== Results ====
The final tally for "Come Back" was 111 points, which technically tied "Come Back" with the Estonian entrant "Runaway" performed by Sahlene for a third place behind the entrants from Malta ("7th Wonder" by Ira Losco) and the winning Latvia ("I Wanna by Marie N). "Come Back" is often cited as having finished third at Eurovision 2002, although in the contest's official rankings "Runaway" is assigned third place and "Come Back" fourth, the preference for "Runaway" being due to its two first place votes (from Latvia and Sweden) while "Come Back" received only one first place vote (from Austria).

Whether considered a third or fourth-place finisher, "Come Back" remained the highest ranked UK entrant at Eurovision of the 21st Century until 2022, when Sam Ryder finished in 2nd place with Space Man.

== Charts ==
"Come Back" debuted at the No. 13 on the UK Singles Chart dated 25 May 2002: its strong showing on the 25 May night of competition for Eurovision 2002 failed to buoy the popularity of the track which dropped out of the Top 30 over the next three weeks, overall spending a total of six weeks in the chart.

Chart (2002)	Peak position
Europe (Eurochart Hot 100)	55
Scottish Singles Sales (Official Charts)	13
UK Singles (Official Charts)	13

Preceded by "No Dream Impossible" by Lindsay Dracass	United Kingdom in the Eurovision Song Contest; 2002	Succeeded by "Cry Baby" by Jemini
