= Nicki French =

English singer (born 1964)

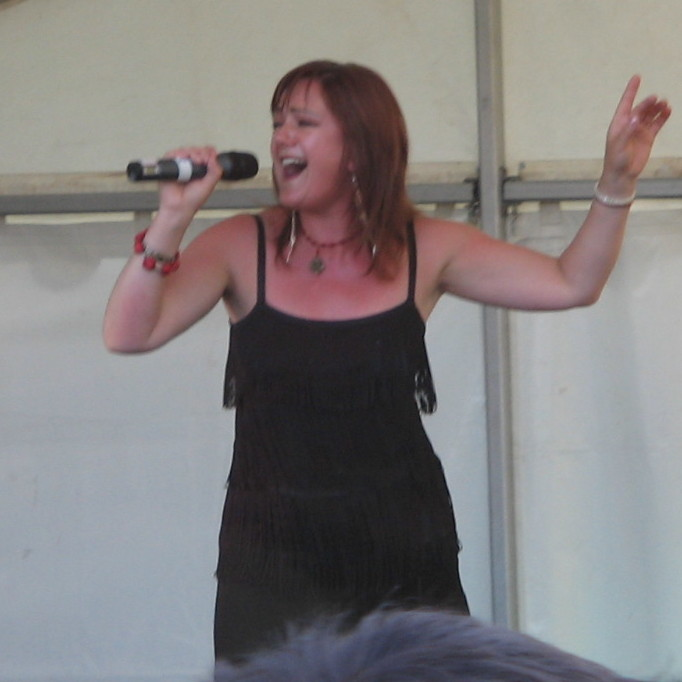
- French performing at the Oxford Gay Pride Festival in 2005

Background information
- Born: Nicola Sharon French; 26 September 1964 (age 61); Carlisle, England
- Genres: Dance, pop, Eurodance
- Occupation: Singer
- Years active: 1992–present
- Labels: Bags of Fun Records/Love This (1992–1996); Klone Records (2005); Energise Records (2006–2015); MPG Ltd (2015); Energise Records (2017-Present)

Nicola Sharon French (born 26 September 1964) is an English singer. She is best known for her 1995 dance cover version of Bonnie Tyler’s "Total Eclipse of the Heart", which reached the US and UK top 5, and for representing the United Kingdom in the Eurovision Song Contest 2000 in Stockholm.

== Life and career ==
=== 1964–1993 ===
French was born in Carlisle, Cumberland, England.

French's first "gig" came at the age of seven, when she was chosen to sing the first verse of "O Little Town of Bethlehem" at her infants' school Christmas concert.

From the age of 16, French studied music and drama at West Kent College in Tonbridge, Kent. She played the lead role of Laurey in Oklahoma! before moving to London and started auditioning for bands and theatre shows.

=== 1980s-1993: Musical beginnings ===
In the mid-1980s, French was part of the duo Whisky and Sofa. They released "Dirty Den" in 1986.

In 1991, French was booked as the leading lady in a series of revue shows on a cruise ship, touring Europe and beyond and covering songs from stage and screen.

In 1992, French provided backing vocals on Rose-Marie's 1992 album, Emotional Exposure. Generally, French had been a session singer for many years before she covered "Total Eclipse of the Heart".

=== 1994–1999: Career peak, Secrets and French Connection ===
In 1994, French covered "Total Eclipse of the Heart", a song originally made famous by Bonnie Tyler. The song reached number 5 during a three-month chart run on the UK Singles Chart, selling over 250,000 (UK) copies in the process and earning a silver sales award. In the United States, the song reached number 2, spending six months on the Billboard Hot 100 chart and gaining gold certification from the RIAA. The single also reached number 1 in a number of countries – Japan, Canada, Spain and Brazil – as well as charting in Australia, Germany, Italy, Mexico, the Netherlands, Denmark and Norway. French sold in excess of 5 million copies.

Her second single, "For All We Know", a cover version of the Carpenters' song, peaked at number 42 on the UK Singles Chart. French's debut album, Secrets, was released in 1995 and further singles from the album included "Is There Anybody Out There?", "Did You Ever Really Love Me?" and "Never in a Million Years". French was Mike Stock's Love This Records's biggest artist before it went into liquidation. Secrets sold over 50,000 copies in its first week of sale in the US.

In 1997, French released French Revolution. The single "Te Amo" peaked at number 4 in Brazil. French Revolution achieved success in Japan and Taiwan but French was then dropped by her record label after management reconstructing.

=== 2000–present: Eurovision Song Contest and diversification ===
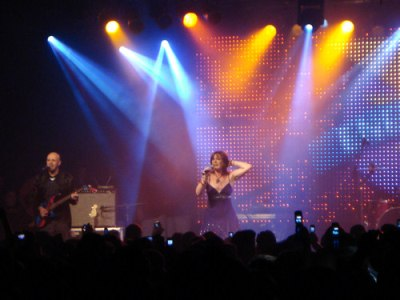
French live onstage

At the Eurovision Song Contest 2000, French represented the United Kingdom with "Don't Play That Song Again". The song was selected by the British public ahead of seven other finalists on radio and TV. French finished the contest in 16th place. The track entered at number 34 in the UK chart.

French signed to Jim Steinman's Ravenous Records label for a short period in 2000, during which time she recorded "Lovers Again" and "Two Out of Three Ain't Bad", neither of which was ever commercially released.

In 2003, French was one of nine contestants on a special Eurovision edition of BBC Television's The Weakest Link. Joining Sonia, Lyn Paul, James Fox, Katie Boyle, Bobby Gee, Jessica Garlick, Katrina Leskanich and Jemini on the show hosted by Anne Robinson, French won the event and was declared 'The Strongest Link' raising £13,000 for Cancer Research, having lost her father to cancer in 1997.

In 2004, French released "I Surrender" and in 2005, "Calling Out My Name". "I Surrender" charted on the UK Indie Chart at #37 and EuroNRG Top 40 chart

In 2007, French was cast as understudy for the original London cast of Menopause the Musical, starring Su Pollard. She was subsequently part of all the UK and Irish productions, and has played three out of the four roles throughout her connection with the show, elevating to being cast in the main roles.

In 2008, French took part in her first pantomime, playing Queen Genevieve in Sleeping Beauty at Chipping Norton Theatre. The pantomime gained great reviews, making it into the top 10 pantomimes in the UK in the Daily Telegraph newspaper. In 2009, French played Fairy Godmother in Cinderella for New Pantomime Productions.

In 2009, a special edition of French's second album, French Revolution, became available. The re-release contained seventeen tracks and included all three of her most recent singles along with a previously unreleased version of "Total Eclipse of the Heart".

In August 2010, French toured the UK in the musical Annie, performing eight different roles every night in the show's long run, and was understudy for the role of Miss Hannigan, played by Su Pollard.

In November 2012, French played the role of Helga Ten Dorp in Ira Levin's Deathtrap at the Brookside Theatre in Romford.

In 2014, 20 years after the success of "Total Eclipse of the Heart'", Mike Stock and French started working together again, recording new tracks for his label Modal Production Group (MPG Ltd). The first release from the studio session was the dance number "This Love". According to Stock, "the song's message is a celebration of love and commitment".

In April 2023, French released a Eurovision covers album, titled Eurovision, featuring edits from her three previous EPs and two new songs.

== Private life ==
French was born in Carlisle to Joseph and Eileen. She has three siblings. The French family moved when Nicki was four and settled in Tenterden, Kent. She attended Homewood School and West Kent College in Tonbridge.

French married Gavin Mallett, a professional musician, in July 1993 at St. Mildred's Church, Tenterden. The couple lived in Middlesex. They are now divorced.

== Discography ==
=== Studio albums ===
List of studio albums, with selected chart positions and certifications
Title	Album details	Peak chart positions	
Title	Album details	AUS	USA
Secrets	Released: 1995; Label: Love This Record; Format: CD, cassette	95	151
French Revolution	Released: 1997; Label: Cutting Edge Records; Format: CD, cassette	—	—
One Step Further	Released: 2015; Label: Energise Records; Format: CD, download	—	—
A Very Nicki Christmas	Released: 2017; Label: Energise Records; Format: CD, download	—	—
Glitter to the Neon Lights	Released: 2018; Label: Energise Records; Format: CD, download	—	—
Who, What, Where	Released: 16 August 2024; Label: Energise Records; Format: CD, download	—	—
Christmas Everywhere	Released: 8 December 2025; Label: Energise Records; Format: CD, download	—	—

=== Mini albums ===
List of mini albums, with selected details
Title	Album details
Rare and Unreleased	Released: 2011; Label: Energise Records; Format: CD, download
Eurovision E.P	Released: 2015; Label: Energise Records; Format: CD, download
This Love	Released: 2015; Label: MPG Records; Format: CD, download
Let's Play That Song Again	Released: 2019; Label: Energise Records; Format: CD, download
A Touch More Glitter	Released: 2020; Label: Energise Records; Format: CD, download
Let's Play That Song Again Vol. 2	Released: 2021; Label: Energise Records; Format: CD, download

=== Compilation albums ===
List of compilation albums, with selected details
Title	Album details
Te Amo – Best Of	Released: 2015; Label: Sandrew Metronome; Format: download
The Essentials	Released: 2015; Label: Sandrew Metronome; Format: download
The Singles 1997–2014	Released: 2015; Label: Energise Records; Format: download
Eurovision	Released: 24 April 2023; Label: Energise Records; Format: download

=== Extended Plays ===
List of EPs, with selected details
Title	Album details
Christmas at the Disco	Released: 30 November 2023; Label: Energise Records; Format: download

=== Singles ===
List of singles as main artist, with selected chart positions, sales figures and certifications
Title	Year	Peak chart positions										Certifications	Album
Title	Year	UK	AUS	BEL	CAN	GER	IRE	JPN	NL	NZ	US	Certifications	Album
"Dirty Den" (as Whisky and Sofa)	1986	—	—	—	—	—	—	—	—	—	—		Non-album single
"You'll Be Sorry" (as The French Connection)	1993	—	—	—	—	—	—	—	—	—	—		Non-album single
"Total Eclipse of the Heart"	1993	54	—	—	—	—	—	—	—	—	—		Non-album single
"Total Eclipse of the Heart" (re-release)	1994	5	2	14	1	65	15	39	10	13	2	BPI: Silver; ARIA: Platinum; RIAA: Gold	Secrets
"For All We Know"	1995	42	89	—	—	—	—	—	—	—	—		Secrets
"Did You Ever Really Love Me"	1995	55	150	—	—	—	—	—	—	—	—		Secrets
"Is There Anybody Out There?"	1995	83	—	—	—	—	—	—	—	—	—		Secrets
"Never in a Million Years" (Sweden and Denmark only)	1995	—	—	—	—	—	—	—	—	—	—		Secrets
"Stop in the Name of Love"/ "Is There Anybody Out There?" (Australia only)	1996	—	227	—	—	—	—	—	—	—	—		Secrets
"Hard to Say I'm Sorry"	1997	—	—	—	—	—	—	—	—	—	—		French Revolution
"Te Amo"	1997	84	—	—	—	—	—	—	—	—	—		French Revolution
"Give It Up Now"	1997	—	—	—	—	—	—	—	—	—	—		French Revolution
"Don't Play That Song Again"	2000	34	—	—	—	—	—	—	—	—	—		Non-album single
"I Surrender"	2004	110	—	—	—	—	—	—	—	—	—		Non-album single
"Calling Out My Name"	2005	—	—	—	—	—	—	—	—	—	—		Non-album single
"Total Eclipse of the Heart 2006" (as Diva DJs vs. Nicki French)	2006	—	—	—	—	—	—	—	—	—	—		Non-album single
"Ain't No Smoke (Without Fire)"	2011	—	—	—	—	—	—	—	—	—	—		Non-album single
"Red Light (Spells Danger)"/"Leave a Light On"	2013	—	—	—	—	—	—	—	—	—	—		One Step Further
"The Boss"	2014	—	—	—	—	—	—	—	—	—	—		One Step Further
"This Love"	2015	—	—	—	—	—	—	—	—	—	—		This Love (EP)
"Teardrops (On the Disco Floor)"	2017	—	—	—	—	—	—	—	—	—	—		Glitter to the Neon Lights
"Steal the Crown"	2018	—	—	—	—	—	—	—	—	—	—		Glitter to the Neon Lights
"On Your Marks, Get Set, Go Away"	2018	—	—	—	—	—	—	—	—	—	—		Glitter to the Neon Lights
"It's Gonna Be a Cold Cold Christmas"	2018	—	—	—	—	—	—	—	—	—	—		A Very Nicki Christmas
"Raise Your Voice"	2019	—	—	—	—	—	—	—	—	—	—		Glitter to the Neon Lights
"Haunted Heart"	2020	—	—	—	—	—	—	—	—	—	—		Who, What, Where
"Last Dance"	2022	—	—	—	—	—	—	—	—	—	—		Who, What, Where
"Santa Claus is Coming to Town"	2022	—	—	—	—	—	—	—	—	—	—		A Very Nicki Christmas
"Nothing Is Impossible"	2024	—	—	—	—	—	—	—	—	—	—		Who, What, Where?
"High Hopes & Heartaches"	2024	—	—	—	—	—	—	—	—	—	—		Who, What, Where?
"S.O.S. (Same Old Story)”	2024	—	—	—	—	—	—	—	—	—	—		Who, What, Where?

=== Other releases ===
- 1995: "Rocking Around the Christmas Tree" (available on vinyl and dance compilations) (Avex Records)
- 2000: "When You Walk in the Room" (on Euro2000 album as Paris) (Dominion Records)
- 2000: "The One and Only" (on Euro2000 album as Paris) (Dominion Records)
- 2000: "Will You Still Love Me Tomorrow?" (on Euro2000 album as Paris) (Dominion Records)
- 2005: "Private Dancer" (for Gayfest album 2005) (Klone Records)

== Industry Awards ==
DMA (magazine) HI-NRG Music Awards

Year	Nominee / work	Award	Result
1995	Herself	Best Female Vocal Performance	Won
1995	Total Eclipse of the Heart	Single of the Year	Won
1995	Herself	Most Promising Newcomer	Won

International Dance Music Awards

Year	Nominee / work	Award	Result
1996	Total Eclipse of the Heart	Best Hi-NRG 12-inch of the Year	Won

Awards and achievements
Preceded by Precious with "Say It Again"	UK in the Eurovision Song Contest; 2000	Succeeded by Lindsay Dracass with "No Dream Impossible"
