= Imaani =

English singer (born 1972)

Imaani Saleem
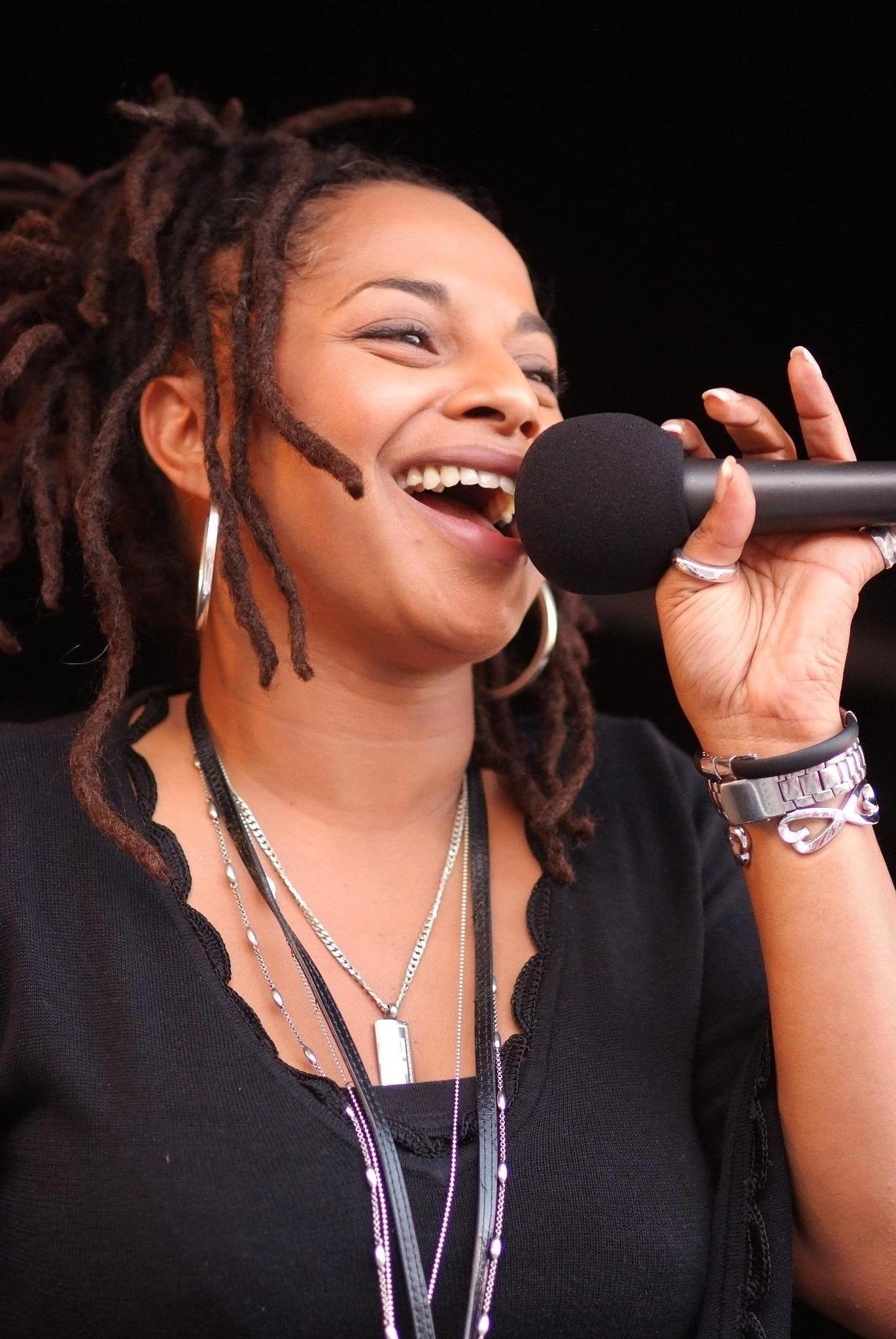
- Imaani performing at the Dalston Festival Vortex in September 2008

Background information
- Also known as: Imaani
- Born: Melonie Crosdale; 1 January 1972 (age 54); Nottingham, England
- Occupation: Singer/Songwriter
- Instrument: Vocals
- Years active: 1995–present
- Label: EMI (1998–99)

Imaani Saleem (born Melonie Crosdale on 1 January 1972) is an English singer, best known for representing the United Kingdom (host country) at the Eurovision Song Contest 1998 in Birmingham with the song "Where Are You". The song placed second in the contest, and became a top-20 hit in the United Kingdom and Benelux.

Although "Where Are You?" remains her only solo chart entry, in 2000 she re-entered the top 20 of the UK Singles Chart alongside Tru Faith & Dub Conspiracy with their version of "Freak Like Me". Later, she recorded many songs with jazz-dance group Incognito, and in 2014 released her debut studio album, Standing Tall.

== Early life and career ==
Saleem was born in Nottingham, England to an interracial Asian-Jamaican couple.

After leaving college and moving to London, a chance encounter on with a music producer on a train led to her entering the music business. In 1995, she provided vocals on the song "Easin' My Mind" by FM Inc., and in 1996, on Incognito's album Beneath the Surface.

=== Eurovision 1998 ===
In 1998, Saleem entered The Great British Song Contest competition to find the UK's song for the Eurovision Song Contest that year. Her track "Where Are You" was a runaway winner with the British public and was selected to represent the UK. Saleem finished a mere six points behind the winner Dana International, in second place in the Eurovision Song Contest 1998.

After its success in the contest, "Where Are You" entered the UK Singles Chart in May 1998, peaking at number 15 and spending 15 non-consecutive weeks in the top 100. The track sold over 250,000 copies. Despite this success, her record label EMI decided to cancel the release of her follow-up single "You Got a Way" in 1999 and parted company with Saleem.

=== After Eurovision ===
In 2000, she supplied the lead vocals on Tru Faith & Dub Conspiracy's UK garage cover of US singer Adina Howard's "Freak Like Me". The song reached No. 12 on the UK Singles Chart. Saleem went on to record with the jazz-funk band Incognito, providing vocals for more than 10 of their records.

Since 2005, Saleem has performed as part of British session organisation the AllStars Collective. The following year, in 2006, she sang on the house track "Bring Me Love" by the Copyright Project on Defected Records. The track received a limited release in the UK, but reached the top 5 on the UK Dance Chart.

In 2014, Saleem released her debut album, Standing Tall. One of its songs, "Struggling" featured on the 2015 soul compilation album Luxury Soul 2015.

In 2023, Saleem together with the Revival Collective released a cover of the Emotions' "Best of My Love" as a single.

== Discography ==
=== Albums ===
- Standing Tall (2014)

=== Charted singles ===
Title	Year	Peak positions						Album
Title	Year	UK	UK Dance	BEL (Fl)	NED Single Top 100	NED Top 40	SCO	Album
"Where Are You"	1998	15	–	12	14	8	16	Non-album singles
"Freak Like Me" (with Tru Faith & Dub Conspiracy)	2000	12	1	–	–	–	–	Non-album singles
"Time" (with Copyright)	2005	129	–	–	–	–	–	Non-album singles
"Bring Me Love" (with Copyright)	2006	–	5	–	–	–	–	Non-album singles

Preceded by Katrina and the Waves with "Love Shine a Light"	UK in the Eurovision Song Contest; 1998	Succeeded by Precious with "Say It Again"
