= Sophie McDonnell =

English TV/radio presenter and singer

- Born: Sophie McDonnell; 3 February 1976 (age 50); Preston, Lancashire, England
- Genre: Pop
- Occupations: Television presenter, radio presenter, singer
- Years active: 1998–present

Sophie McDonnell (born 3 February 1976) is an English television/radio presenter and former singer. She was a member of the group Precious, the UK entry for the Eurovision Song Contest in 1999 at which they placed 12th. She later presented children's television for CBBC until 2006.

== Biography ==
Sophie McDonnell was born in Preston, Lancashire and worked as a model and actress before joining girl band Precious. She has acted in Emmerdale, which is a British soap opera.

She presented in-vision links on the CBBC channel up until summer 2006, and presented The Big Toe Radio Show on BBC7 from 2006 to 2009. She presented the final series of 50/50 on CBBC and co-hosted the channel's coverage of Comic Relief Does Fame Academy in 2005.

In 2007, McDonnell starred in a production of Snow White and the Seven Dwarfs at the Kings Theatre, Southsea.

== Filmography ==
Year	Title	Role	Notes
1999	Eurovision Song Contest	Herself	Part of girl band Precious
2000	Emmerdale	Guest role	
2002–06	CBBC	Herself	Continuity presenter
2004	Stupid!	Herself	Episode: Human Food
2005	Comic Relief Does Fame Academy	Herself	Co-presenter of CBBC's coverage
2005	50/50	Herself	Main presenter for final series
2005	Bamzooki	Herself	Guest presenter
2006–09	BBC 7	Herself	Main presenter
