= Pete Waterman =

English record producer, songwriter, broadcaster, and railway enthusiast

Pete Waterman OBE DL
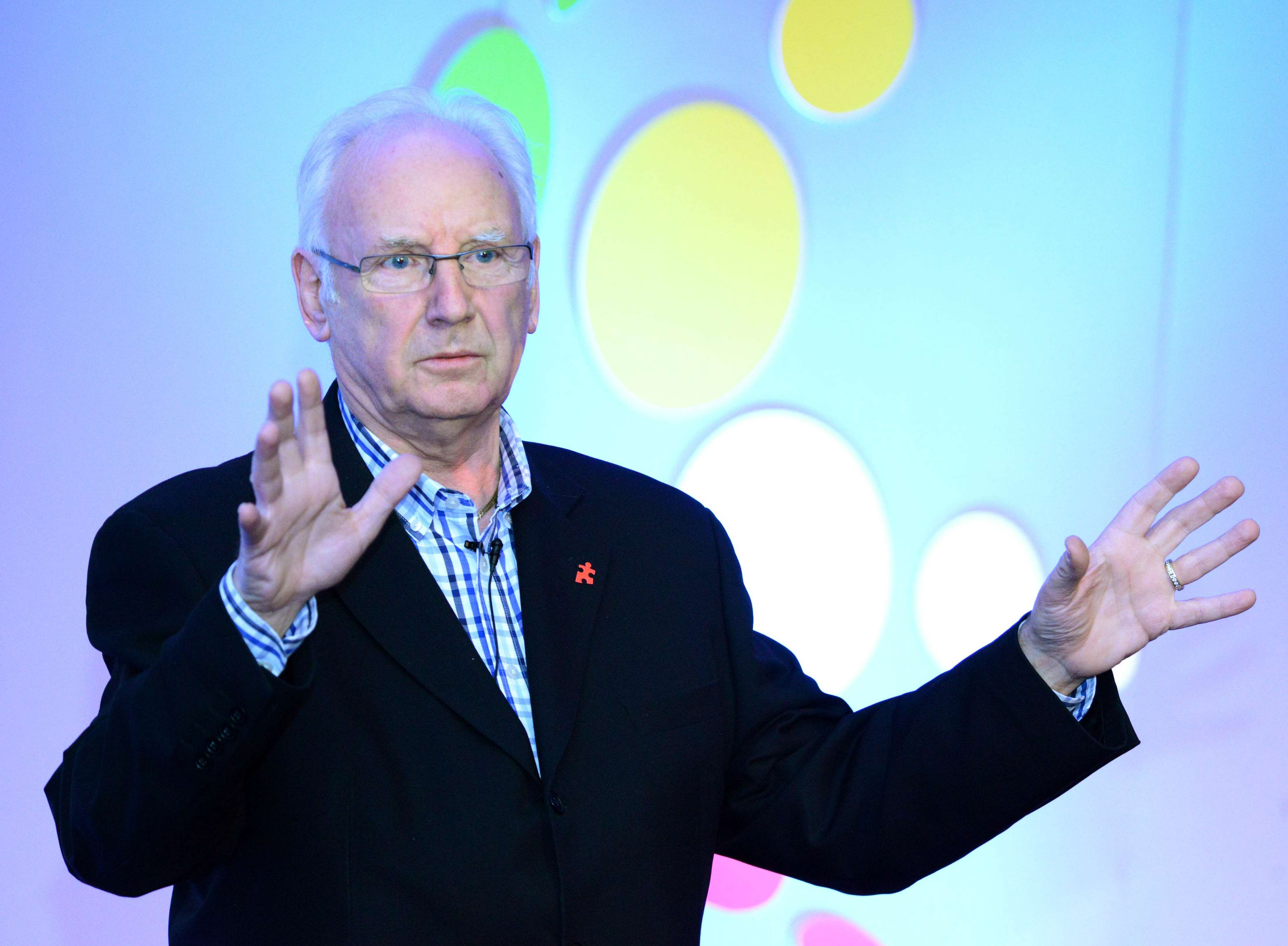
- Waterman in 2014
- Born: Peter Alan Waterman; 15 January 1947 (age 79); Coventry, Warwickshire, England
- Occupations: Record producer; songwriter; radio and club DJ; music manager; businessman; railway enthusiast (commercial)
- Years active: 1960s–present
- Title: Chairman of Pete Waterman Entertainment (1984–present); President of Coventry Bears
- Spouses: Elizabeth Reynolds (m. 1970; div. 1974); Julie Reeves (m. 1980; div. 1984); Denise Gyngell (m. 1991; div. 1999)
- Children: 4
- Website: pwl-empire.com

Peter Alan Waterman OBE DL (born 15 January 1947) is an English record producer, songwriter, and television personality. As a member of the Stock Aitken Waterman production and songwriting team, he co-wrote and co-produced many UK hit singles. An avid railway enthusiast, Waterman is the owner of significant collections of both historic and commercial railway locomotives and rolling stock.

== Early life ==
Peter Alan Waterman was born in Stoke Heath, Coventry, Warwickshire on Wednesday, 15 January 1947. He was educated at Whitley Abbey Comprehensive School until he left in 1962 to work for British Railways. He became a steam locomotive fireman based at Wolverhampton (Stafford Road) depot. In 2002 he said of his time working for British Railways, "I loved every minute of it. The squalor was unreal, but the camaraderie was phenomenal." After closure of the depot in 1963, Waterman chose to follow a career in music, being inspired by The Beatles. To supplement his income as a DJ, he became a gravedigger and then an apprentice at General Electric Company, becoming a trade union official. He also worked as a coal miner.

== Musical career ==
Building a record collection through rare US imports, his DJ work began to take him across the UK, entertaining bigger crowds with a blend of rhythm and blues and soul music tunes he had sourced. Given a residency with the Mecca Leisure Group, he developed new initiatives including matinée discos for under 18s at Coventry's Locarno club, which gave him a valuable insight into what music interested a younger audience. Waterman noticed that the younger dancers preferred records with high beats per minute and this influenced his later work. It was at the Locarno that Waterman first met Neville Staple, later to be a vocalist for The Specials – a band that Waterman would manage for a brief period. In early 2009, Waterman wrote the foreword to Staple's biography, Original Rude Boy, which was published by Aurum Press in May 2009.

Waterman took up a job as an A&R man, and worked in the Philadelphia scene, which included introducing the Three Degrees to the UK. He then moved to Jamaica working with Peter Tosh and Lee Perry, and producing Susan Cadogan’s reggae-crossover hit "Hurt So Good".

In 1979, Waterman set up Loose Ends with Peter Collins, the first coming under the name 14–18 with a single inspired by World War I, "Good-Bye-Ee," and hits with artists like Musical Youth and Nik Kershaw. He then set up his own company PWL (Pete Waterman Limited) in 1984, quickly signing producers Matt Aitken and Mike Stock, who produced the song "Whatever I Do" for Hazell Dean. Stock Aitken Waterman became one of the most successful musical production teams of the 1980s.

Waterman has been involved in at least twenty-two UK number one singles with his acts (including Dead or Alive, Kylie Minogue, Rick Astley, Bananarama, Steps, Mel and Kim, Donna Summer, Sinitta, Cliff Richard and Jason Donovan) and he claims upwards of 500 million sales worldwide (inclusive of singles, albums, compilation inclusions, downloads, etc.). Waterman also appeared in the Steps' video "Tragedy".

In the late-1990s, production company Celador hired Waterman to compose a song for their new quiz show, Who Wants to Be a Millionaire?. The company felt the song unsuitable, and instead approached Keith Strachan.

Waterman co-wrote and produced with Mike Stock "That Sounds Good to Me" by Josh Dubovie, the 2010 Eurovision Song Contest entry for the United Kingdom, which finished in last place with 10 points.

Waterman was worth £30 million in 2006/07, according to The Sunday Times Rich List.

=== Television ===
Waterman co-presented The Hit Man and Her (1988–1992) with Michaela Strachan. He also presented a show on Radio City.

Waterman has appeared as a judge on both series of Pop Idol in the UK (2001–03), and also Popstars: The Rivals (2002). The latter saw him become manager of the winning boy band One True Voice, who then lost the race to Christmas number 1 to the same show's winning girl group, Louis Walsh's Girls Aloud.

Waterman returned as judge for the second series of Pop Idol, but was constantly critical of the eventual winner, Michelle McManus, and was openly disappointed when she won. Waterman has since said he will not appear on any similar programmes in future, and has on several occasions attacked more recent talent shows (specifically those devised by his former Pop Idol colleague, Simon Cowell). Waterman has stated that he turned down offers to participate in The X Factor, Britain's Got Talent and American Idol, citing fix allegations and being put off by unprofessional behaviour including that of Popstars: The Rivals co-judge Geri Halliwell during the show.

Whilst he has kept his promise not to appear as a talent show judge, on 12 October 2008, Waterman joined his fellow ex-Pop Idol judges Neil Fox and Nicki Chapman on Peter Kay's spoof talent show Britain's Got the Pop Factor... and Possibly a New Celebrity Jesus Christ Soapstar Superstar Strictly on Ice, a fully scripted fictional spoof on the talent show genre. The show parodied the emotional manipulation behind Cowell's shows, with Waterman memorably interrupting a funeral to tell an ousted contestant that the loss of his gran (who had died of shock when learning her grandson had been dropped from the show) would provide the sob story he needed to get him on to the show.

In factual television, Waterman's interest in trains saw him present a historic self-retrospective view in Waterman on Railways for Channel Four/the Discovery Channel. Waterman also appeared in an advert by the National Blood Service in the UK, their sixth TV advert which also features Carol Smillie and Will Carling.

Waterman was one of the contestants in the 2009 series of the BBC programme Celebrity MasterChef, but was knocked out in the first round.

In October 2019, Waterman appeared on The X Factor: Celebrity. Waterman was part of an all star audience during the auditions stage in Malibu at Simon Cowell’s house, providing commentary critique behind the main judges, alongside Randy Jackson, Howie Mandel and songwriter Diane Warren.

=== Eurovision ===
Waterman wrote and produced the UK entry for the 2010 Eurovision Song Contest. This song was performed by the final three acts on Eurovision, Your Country Needs You! on 12 March 2010, Josh Dubovie was chosen to represent the UK. The song came under much criticism and William Hill's betting odds gave the song 125-1 chance that the song would win, the longest odds for a UK entry ever. In the end the song, "That Sounds Good to Me", came last at the 2010 Eurovision Song Contest receiving only 10 points in total.

== Other commercial interests ==
=== Railways ===
Waterman's main interest outside music is in railways, and he has been involved in several railway ventures. In 1988 he revived the name of the London & North Western Railway, which as a group encompassed various ventures:

- LNWR: a rail vehicle maintenance business, based at Crewe it had depots across the country, and was by the time of its sale the largest privately owned rail maintenance business in the country. Having accrued debts of £2 million in building the business in November 2008, Waterman sold it to Arriva UK Trains.
- Waterman Railways: In 1994 during the opening stages of the privatisation of British Rail, Waterman bought the Special Trains Unit effective from April 1995, which ran tourist charters and special trains with six Class 47 locomotives and 200 Mark 1, Mark 2 and Mark 3 carriages. This was the first unit sold from the LNWR Group.
- LNWR Heritage: was the steam locomotive and carriage restoration arm, based at Crewe Heritage Centre. The company undertook the restoration of Waterman's own locomotives, as well as various complete contract locomotive renovation and boiler overhaul work. Waterman became involved from 2012 in an industry bid to create a national railway apprenticeship scheme, but the bid was rejected in autumn 2013. In March 2014, Waterman sold the business to the Royal Scot Locomotive and General Trust.

To hold his own collection of locomotives, he founded the Waterman Railway Heritage Trust, which currently owns several steam and diesel locomotives including:

- GWR 4575 class number 5553
- GWR 5205 class number 5224
- GWR 5600 class number 6634
- British Rail Class 08 number 08830 (D3998)
- British Rail Class 25 number 25309 (D7659)
- 46035 Ixion
- 47402 Gateshead
- SAR NGG 16 Class number 109

Waterman also has a keen interest in model railways, and is the founder of the model railway business Just Like the Real Thing, which specialises in O Gauge kits. He works closely with model-maker Laurie Lynch on this project. He continues to retain an interest in the company and regularly accompanies its sales stand to model railway exhibitions. Waterman has an extensive private collection of railway models and railway layouts, in O scale and larger gauges. He is currently building a large model of Leamington Spa railway station, in O scale and set in the 1950s. He has written several books and many magazine articles on the subject. He has said that his ability to become absorbed in making models helped him cope with grief after the death of his son.

In 2007, Waterman became involved in a co-operative UK rail industry bid to create a national railway training scheme under the then Labour government, which after the Government seed funding was withdrawn from all such schemes, was halted in 2009. Waterman revealed in 2011 that he had since spent £900,000 of his own money on training apprentices at Crewe, and that outside Network Rail's own scheme, only 37 apprentices had been taken into the rail industry in 2011. In January 2015, Waterman announced the sale of the bulk of his model railway collection, to fund the training of rail apprentices in restoring his steam locomotives 5224 and 5553, which in May 2015 were moved from Crewe to Peak Rail. In April 2015, the collection sold for £627,229 at the auction in Birmingham. In July 2015, in partnership with rail engineering firm OSL, Waterman launched the Railway Exchange Training Academy (RETA) at Crewe.

In June 2009, Waterman unveiled Manchester Metrolink Firema T-68 1007s new name “East Lancashire Railway” as a tribute to the Heritage Railway at Bury tram stop.

In October 2018, Waterman unveiled The Will Hay Appreciation Society's memorial bench to Will Hay, Moore Marriott and Graham Moffatt in Cliddesden, Hampshire the filming location for Buggleskelly in the railway comedy film Oh, Mr Porter!.

In 2018, Waterman became president of the Railway Benefit Fund, a railway benevolent charity based in Crewe.

On 20 October 2021 during a High Speed 2 site visit Waterman announced the name of one of the tunnel boring machines to be Dorothy.

In 2021 and 2022, Pete Waterman produced two different OO Gauge model layouts at Chester Cathedral. Both modelled different parts of the West Coast Main Line, with each being branded as 'Making Tracks' and in 2023, Pete, and his group of other enthusiasts nicknamed the 'Railnuts' group, produced a model railway focusing on Milton Keynes Central railway station.

During 1‒3 August 2025 the "Milton Keynes Central" layout was on display for the Greatest Gathering held at Derby Litchurch Lane Works.

=== Sport ===
In addition to his passion for music and railways, Waterman is also a supporter of Walsall F.C. though he supported Coventry City for many years. He is also a rugby league fan and is president of League 1 side Coventry Bears.

== Honours ==
In 2001, Waterman was made an Honorary Doctor of Business Administration by Coventry University for his services to the pop industry. In 2004, he was awarded an honorary doctorate in music by University College Chester. In the New Year Honours List published 31 December 2004, he was made an OBE for his services to music. In December 2006, he became a patron of the newly formed charity, the City, Lambeth and Southwark Music Education Trust. In 2016, Waterman was awarded Fellowship of the Royal Northern College of Music (FRNCM), making him the first pop musician to be given the award.

In September 2024, a Freightliner Class 90 №90041 was named in honour of Pete Waterman, with a plaque placed on both sides of the locomotive

== Personal life ==
Waterman has been married three times:

- Elizabeth Reynolds (m. 1970–74, divorced): one son, Paul (1971–2005)
- Julie Reeves (m. 1980–84, divorced): one son
- Denise Gyngell (m. 1991–99, divorced): two children

== Bibliography ==
- Waterman, Pete (2000). I Wish I Was Me: The Autobiography. London: Virgin Books. ISBN 978-1-85227-900-4.
- Waterman, Pete (2008). A Train is for Life. Shepperton: Ian Allan Publishing. ISBN 978-0-7110-3329-0.
- Waterman, Pete (2009). Just like the Real Thing: Modelling Railways. Shepperton: Ian Allan Publishing. ISBN 978-0-7110-3455-6.
- Waterman, Pete (5 November 2009). The Fame Factor. Shepperton: Ian Allan Publishing. ISBN 978-0-7110-3411-2.
