= Where Are You? (Imaani song) =

1998 song by Imaani

Single by Imaani
- Released: 9 March 1998
- Genre: House
- Length: 3:14
- Label: EMI
- Songwriters: Scott English; Phil Manikiza; Simon Stirling

Eurovision Song Contest 1998 entry
- Country: United Kingdom
- Artist: Imaani Saleem
- As: Imaani
- Language: English
- Composers: Scott English; Phil Manikiza; Simon Stirling
- Lyricists: Scott English; Phil Manikiza; Simon Stirling
- Conductor: James McMillan

Finals performance
- Final result: 2nd
- Final points: 166

Entry chronology
- ◄ "Love Shine a Light" (1997)
- "Say It Again" (1999) ►

Official performance video
- "Where Are You?" on YouTube

"Where Are You?" was the United Kingdom's entry to the Eurovision Song Contest 1998, performed in English by Imaani Saleem (better known as simply Imaani), held in Birmingham, United Kingdom. It was composed by Scott English, Phil Manikiza and Simon Stirling. The song placed second, becoming the UK's fifteenth entry to place in that position. This was the last time that the UK placed in the contest's top 2 up until the 2022 competition in which Sam Ryder, with his song "Space Man", came 2nd to Ukraine.

Upon its commercial release, the song achieved commercial success, peaking within the top 15 on three European countries' singles charts: the United Kingdom, the Netherlands, and Belgium. Critics retrospectively regard the song as one of the UK's better Eurovision entries, with many praising her vocal performance. The song is also remembered as the last time that the United Kingdom came close to winning the contest, until coming second again in 2022.

== Eurovision ==
=== Background ===
Described as a "dark, thumping house track," "Where Are You" was first entered in The Great British Song Contest selection process, where it was extremely popular.

=== Results ===
The song came in second place in the 1998 Eurovision contest, with 166 points. It marked the fifteenth time that the United Kingdom held second place in the contest. The song lost to "Diva" by Dana International, which won with three countries awarding it 12 points and a total of 172 points.

=== Historical context ===
The UK's previous entry, Katrina & The Waves' "Love Shine a Light", had marked the last time that the United Kingdom won the contest. "Where Are You?" was the United Kingdom's last time in the top 2 in the Eurovision contest, and its thirteenth consecutive song to place in the contest's top 10. Chris West, in his book Eurovision: A History of Modern Europe through the World's Greatest Song Contest, posited that the song marked the UK's last time in the top 2 due to a change in the contest's language rules, thus taking the lead away from English-speaking countries.

== Commercial performance ==
After the song's release, it became a top 20 hit throughout Europe. Billboard predicted that the single would peak within the top 10 on the UK Singles chart. On the UK Singles Chart, the song debuted at number 96 on the singles chart dated 21 March 1998. It spent six weeks on the chart in its first run; on the chart dated 9 May, the single re-entered the chart at number 60, a new peak. It rose into the top 40 the following week, when it climbed 28 spots to reach number 32; the following week, on the chart dated 23 May 1998, the song reached its number 15 peak on the singles chart. It spent a total of 15 nonconsecutive weeks in the top 100, 4 of them in the top 40. It remains Imaani's sole solo chart entry in the United Kingdom, although she re-appeared on the Singles Chart in 2000, providing vocals on Tru Faith & Dub Conspiracy's cover of "Freak Like Me" (originally recorded by Adina Howard), which peaked at number 12.

The single also charted in two other European countries: Belgium and the Netherlands. In Belgium, the song debuted at number 30 on the Ultratop Flanders chart dated 23 May 1998. It eventually peaked at number 12, where it remained for two weeks; the single spent 12 weeks on the singles chart. In the Netherlands, the song entered both the Dutch Top 40 and the Single Top 100 charts. It achieved a higher peak on the Dutch Top 40: on that chart, it peaked at number 8, becoming Imaani's only top 10 entry on that chart; it spent a total of 7 weeks in the top 40. On the Dutch Single Top 100 chart, the song debuted at number 60 on the chart dated 23 May 1998; it achieved a peak of number 14, where it spent one week, and spent a total of 15 weeks in the top 100.

The song was included in the 1998 British popular music compilation Now That's What I Call Music! 40; it was the third of four UK Eurovision submissions to be chronicled by the compilation series.

== Legacy ==
In 2014, Official Charts inducted the song into its "Pop Gem Hall of Fame," praising Imaani's "powerhouse vocals" and deeming the song the UK's best Eurovision entry in 16 years. In July 2017, the official website for Eurovision Song Contest ranked "Where Are You" at number 6 on their list of best UK Eurovision songs. The Telegraph placed the song at number 18 on their ranking of every UK Eurovision submission, praising Saleem's vocals as "soulful" and giving the song a "real emotional punch," but commenting that the song's backing track and drum machine make the song sound dated.

== Charts ==
=== Weekly charts ===
Chart (1998)	Peak position
Belgium (Ultratop 50 Flanders)	12
Europe (Eurochart Hot 100)	67
Greece (IFPI)	5
Iceland (Íslenski Listinn Topp 40)	33
Netherlands (Dutch Top 40)	8
Netherlands (Single Top 100)	14
Scotland (OCC)	16
UK Singles (Official Charts)	15

=== Year-end charts ===
Chart (1998)	Position
Netherlands (Dutch Top 40)	99

Preceded by "Love Shine a Light" by Katrina and the Waves	United Kingdom in the Eurovision Song Contest; 1998	Succeeded by "Say It Again" by Precious
