= Lindsay Dracass =

English pop music singer (born 1984)

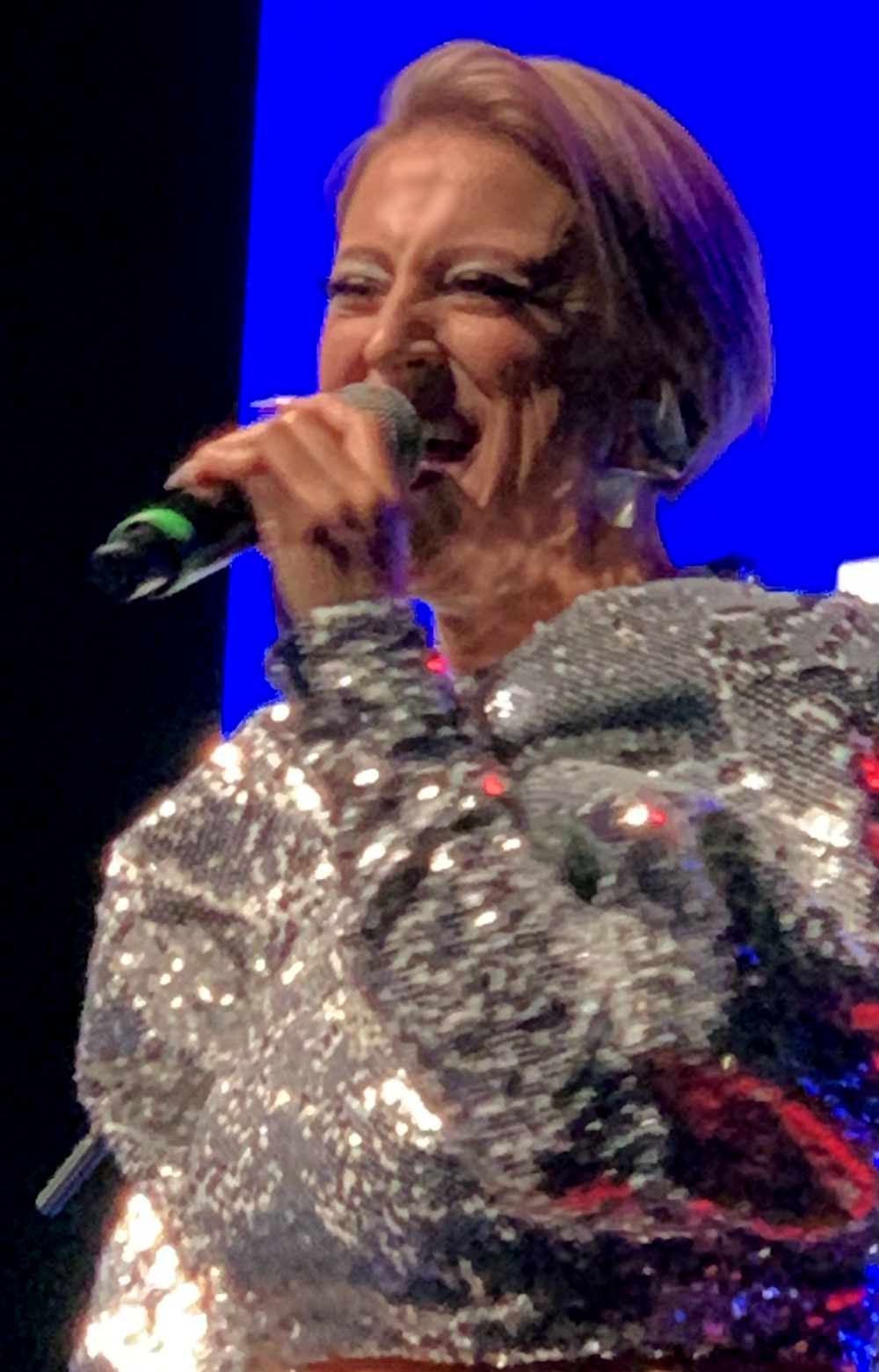
- Dracass in 2023

Background information
- Born: 3 September 1984 (age 42); Sheffield, South Yorkshire, England
- Genre: Pop
- Occupation: Singer
- Instrument: Vocals
- Years active: 2001–present
- Label: Universal Records (2001)

Lindsay Dracass (born 3 September 1984) is an English pop music singer.

== Early life ==
Lindsay Dracass was born in Sheffield, South Yorkshire to parents Martin and Denise (née Hill).

== Career ==
Dracass was discovered at 13 years old by Alan Wood. She was directed to Alan Kirk's recording studio, and the demos she recorded were then played to Peter Van Hooke, who signed Dracass to his production company who then, in turn, signed her to a recording contract with Universal Records.

=== Eurovision 2001 ===
As a 16-year-old schoolgirl, she was selected through the BBC One television programme, A Song for Europe, to be the UK's entrant for the Eurovision Song Contest 2001, which was held at the Parken Stadium in Copenhagen, Denmark. With the song "No Dream Impossible", Dracass was the sixteenth act to sing on the night (out of twenty three countries), and came fifteenth overall with 28 points - Ireland being the country to give her the most points (four). The track reached no. 32 in the UK Singles Chart in May that year.

=== After Eurovision ===
Dracass later toured Europe, with Paul Carrack and his band supporting bands such as The Eagles on their 2009 Long Road Out of Eden tour.

Dracass appeared on BBC One's prime time Saturday night show All Together Now as part of the 100.

Her album Waiting for You, produced at Steelworks studios in Sheffield, was written by Julian Jones and released on 10 February 2019. In November 2019, the first single "Not Mine" from the album Waiting for You was released. The digital release of "No Dream Impossible" went out on all digital platforms on 13 April 2020.

== Discography ==
Year	Song	UK Singles Chart
2001	"No Dream Impossible"	32
2019	"Not Mine"	-

Year	Album	UK Albums Chart
2019	Waiting For You	-

Preceded by Nicki French with "Don't Play That Song Again"	UK in the Eurovision Song Contest; 2001	Succeeded by Jessica Garlick with "Come Back"
