= Glan-y-Môr Comprehensive School =

Comprehensive school in Wales

Glan-y-Môr School

Location
- Burry Port, Carmarthenshire, Wales, United Kingdom
- Coordinates: 51.6863°N 4.2540°W

Information
- Type: Comprehensive
- Motto: Welsh: Ymdrech â Lwydda "Success through Effort"
- Enrolment: 446 (2015)
- Website: http://www.glanymorschool.co.uk/

Glan-y-Môr Comprehensive School is a mixed, community comprehensive school of around 600 pupils, catering for all abilities across an age range of 11 years to 16. The school is situated at the heart of the town of Burry Port, though pupils are drawn from the wider area and are bused in from a catchment area consisting of small towns and villages.

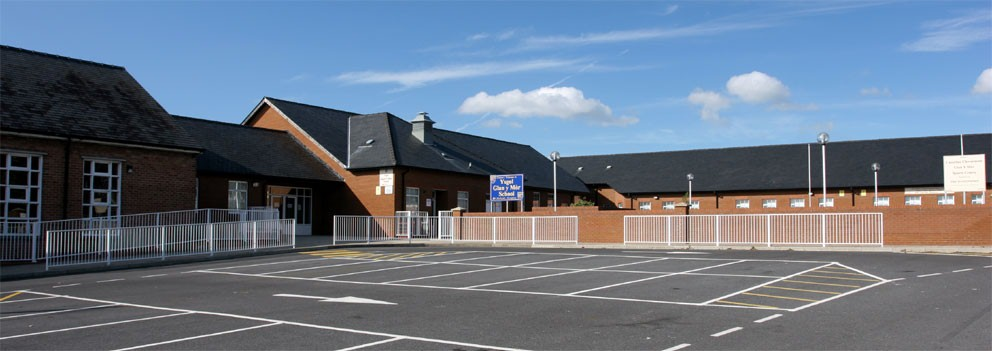
Glan-y-Môr School as seen from the front

The main partner primary schools are:

- Burry Port Junior School
- Pembrey Community Primary School
- Ysgol-y-Castell, Kidwelly
- Trimsaran Community Primary School
- Pwll Community Primary School
- Ysgol Mynydd-y-Garreg.

== Welsh Language ==
The Welsh Government currently defines the school as a 'predominantly English Medium secondary school', meaning that pupils are mainly taught through the medium of English. However, the school states that in its current prospectus that 'Welsh is a prominent feature of the school’s ethos and an integral part of daily school life'.

According to the latest Estyn inspection report, 4% of the pupils come from homes where the predominant language spoken is Welsh. Welsh as a subject is currently taught as a second language only.

== Outside praise ==
Glan-y-Môr has recently received praise from a number of sources:

- Schools in and around Carmarthenshire have raised more than £8,000 to help children living in slums around the world. Local schools joined forces with almost 300 others around the country to participate in a special sporting event to raise much needed cash. The Schoolchildren for Children charity event held last September raised £8,134.05. Glan-y-Môr School's contribution was £1000.
- Glan-y-Môr takes part annually in the University of Wales, Lampeter's Expanding Horizons programme. This is designed to support and help young people aged 15 and 16 to achieve at least a grade C or above in the core curriculum subjects of Maths, English, Science and Welsh in their GCSEs. Glan-y-Môr supply around 20 students to take part in the revision sessions. The Revision Week is provided at no cost to the students (not even for study materials and books etc.) as the programme is supported by the West and Mid Wales Widening Access Partnership, European Union Social Fund and Scottish Power Learning.
- The school had appointed a full-time 'agony aunt' to help pupils deal with problems such as bullying, relationships and stress; however, this full-time 'agony aunt' Margaret Yeoman left the school in 2006. Glan-y-Môr Comprehensive in Burry Port was among the first in Wales to offer such a service and the move has won the backing of a leading children's charity...Cordula Bellan of Childline said: "Most schools really try hard to meet the emotional needs of pupils today. It's a good thing to have an independent person in a school to offer counselling...I think many schools will be interested in following this (Glan-y-Môr)."

== Prom controversy ==
Glan-y-Môr School faced some controversy when the mother of a year 11 pupil that had been banned from going to the 2008 school Prom took her story to the local press. The student's mother claimed that, despite being no angel, her daughter should be allowed to go to her school prom. There was a large amount of feedback given to South West Wales Media (Publisher of South Wales Evening Post & Llanelli Star) with backing being given to the school. Running the story in the media did not cause the Headteacher to back down. The pupil did not attend the prom.

== Sporting success ==
During 2008 Glan-y-Môror School has been punching above its weight in the sporting arena with many successes to celebrate. Kirby Myhill has been playing rugby for Wales at U16 level. Emily Downey came third in the Welsh Schools Championships Cross-Country event and then went on to represent Wales at the SIAB International Schools' Cross Country Championships. Nicky Morrell also had an excellent athletics campaign, coming 1st in the West Wales Cross Country Champions at under 17 level, fourth in the Welsh Schools Championships Cross-Country event and twenty first at the SIAB International Schools' Cross Country Championships.

== Anti-bullying initiative success ==
During 2007-2008 some Year 11 pupils set up an Anti Bullying Initiative, within Glan-y-Môrto help combat bullying within the school. The scheme was backed by many staff and external professionals. The scheme involved daily sessions in which students went along and learned about what bullying is, what they could do to stop it. The school council received an award from Carmarthenshire's Local Health Board for planning and implementing the scheme.

Glan-y-Môr has said they will "build on the success of the scheme and make it better year by year to help stop bullying".
