= The Original Recordings 1983–1984 =

Compilation album by Katrina and the Waves
- Released: 14 October 2003
- Recorded: 1983–1984
- Studio: Alaska Studios, London; Greenhouse, London
- Genre: New wave; pop rock
- Length: 78:47
- Label: Bongo Beat
- Producer: Pat Collier; Katrina and the Waves

Katrina and the Waves chronology
Walking on Sunshine – The Greatest Hits of Katrina and the Waves (1997)	The Original Recordings 1983–1984 (2003)

The Original Recordings 1983–1984 is a compilation album by British-American rock band Katrina and the Waves, released on 14 October 2003 by Canadian label Bongo Beat. It compiles for the first time on CD all twenty tracks from the band's first two Canadian-only albums, Walking on Sunshine (1983) and Katrina and the Waves 2 (1984), as well as four previously unreleased bonus tracks. It also includes a DVD featuring live footage and music videos.

== Content ==
The Original Recordings 1983–1984 is a 20th anniversary limited edition CD containing all the tracks from the first two Katrina and the Waves albums that were released only in Canada on Attic Records in 1983 and 1984. The collection was compiled and issued by Bongo Beat label owner Ralph Alfonso, a former Attic employee who had been instrumental in getting the band signed to Attic in 1983. Half of the songs on the first two albums were re-recorded when the band signed an international record deal with Capitol Records in late 1984, and released the Katrina and the Waves album in 1985. The previously unreleased bonus tracks consist of the album outtakes "That's Just the Woman in Me" (covered by Celine Dion in 1997), "River Deep Mountain High" (originally recorded by Ike & Tina Turner), "Heartbeat (originally recorded by Buddy Holly)", and a 1983 live recording of "Walking on Sunshine". The album contains 24 pages of liner notes, including exclusive interviews with singer Katrina Leskanich, guitarist Kimberley Rew, drummer Alex Cooper, and producer Pat Collier. All tracks have been remastered for this release.

=== DVD ===
The accompanying DVD contains a never before seen live set taped at Shepperton Film Studios on 29 December 1983. It was taped for promotional use by IDS/Geoff Hannington and Chris Tookey Productions in front of an invited audience of 200, the idea being to shop the band to a record label and maybe get part of it shown on TV. It features an introduction by BBC Radio 1's Richard Skinner, who was an early champion of the band. The video was directed by Chris Tookey, who would later also direct the Capitol music video for "Walking on Sunshine". Additional live to two-track recordings were done by producer Pat Collier. Also included are the original 1983 music videos for "Walking on Sunshine" and "Mexico", and a 2003 animated video for "Dancing Street", created by Canadian animator Patrick Jenkins. In his Artist Biography on AllMusic, Bruce Eder said that "the existence of the [bonus DVD] makes up, in part, for the fact that the band never released a live album."

== Critical reception ==
Professional ratings
Review scores
Source	Rating
AllMusic	4.5/5 stars

In a 1985 article in Playboy, music critic Robert Christgau wrote, "Nobody who had heard 1983's Walking on Sunshine or 1984's 2 ... could understand why no U.S. label was backing Katrina and the Waves head to head against the Pretenders. Songwriter-guitarist Kimberley Rew has an unerring knack for up-to-the-minute Sixties-style hooks and writes rock-outsider lyrics that never get obtrusively specific; singer-guitarist Katrina Leskanich has a voice so big and enthusiastic she could make Barry Manilow's songs sound like Holland-Dozier-Holland. Commercially speaking, what more could you want?"

In his review of The Original Recordings 1983–1984 for AllMusic, John D. Luerssen wrote, "Stripping away the major-label production that overshadowed the group's subsequent 1985 breakthrough ... this reissue boasts 24 tracks of delightful nostalgia ... largely unheard tracks like the irresistible rocker "Spiderman" and the hummable "Brown Eyed Son" are out of this world." He concluded that, decades later, "these old Waves tracks still sound tremendous." Chuck Molgat, writing for Exclaim! magazine, wrote that there's a lot more to the band "than the disposable saccharine optimism of "Walking on Sunshine" might otherwise suggest." He noted that the band, on most of the best tracks, revisit "classic Motown-era soul and R&B", updated with "1980s production nuances", occasionally with a negative result. Though the material has been remastered, Molgat felt that, "ultimately, the sonic date stamp remains."

Ben Varkentine, writing for the Ink 19 website, wrote, "On the one hand, the lack of originality is evident to anyone with a semi-experienced ear. ... On the other, when the volume is pumped up loud, who cares?" PopMatters felt that while the albums, in retrospect, are "bright, clear and fresh, they are hardly groundbreaking."

== Track listing ==
All songs written by Kimberley Rew, except where noted.

No.	Title	Writer(s)	Length
1.	"Dancing Street"		2:24
2.	"Spiderman"		3:12
3.	"Going Down to Liverpool"		3:45
4.	"Machine Gun Smith"		2:55
5.	"Walking on Sunshine"		3:15
6.	"Brown Eyed Son"		2:03
7.	"Que Te Quiero"		3:17
8.	"Don't Take Her Out of My World"		2:53
9.	"I Really Taught Me to Watusi"		3:02
10.	"Ain't No Money (Buy You Love)"		2:35
11.	"Do You Want Crying"	Vince de la Cruz	4:02
12.	"Maniac House"		4:08
13.	"She Loves to Groove"		2:55
14.	"Cry for Me"		3:58
15.	"Red Wine and Whisky"		3:15
16.	"Mexico"	de la Cruz	2:50
17.	"One Woman"	de la Cruz	3:35
18.	"The Sun Won't Shine Without You"		3:54
19.	"He's a Charmer"		3:16
20.	"The Game of Love"		3:18
21.	"That's Just the Woman in Me" (Previously unreleased)		4:15
22.	"River Deep Mountain High" (Previously unreleased)	Phil Spector, Jeff Barry, Ellie Greenwich	3:06
23.	"Heartbeat" (Previously unreleased)	Bob Montgomery, Norman Petty	2:35
24.	"Walking on Sunshine" (Live 1983; previously unreleased)		3:44
Total length:			78:47

DVD: Live at Shepperton Film Studios 1983
No.	Title	Writer(s)	Length
1.	"Que Te Quiero"
2.	"Game of Love"
3.	"Do You Want Crying"
4.	"Walking on Sunshine"
5.	"Don't Take Her Out of My World"
6.	"Mexico"	de la Cruz
7.	"Brown Eyed Son"
8.	"Maniac House"
9.	"I Really Taught Me to Watusi"
10.	"Monkey Town"
Total length:			37:32

DVD bonus videos
No.	Title	Length
1.	"Dancing Street" (Black and white)	2:50
2.	"Dancing Street" (Colour)	2:49
3.	"Walking on Sunshine" (1983 original video clip)	3:46
4.	"Mexico" (1983 original video clip)	2:57

Note

- CD tracks 1–10 from Walking on Sunshine; tracks 11–20 from Katrina and the Waves 2.

== Personnel ==
Katrina and the Waves

- Katrina Leskanich – lead vocals, rhythm guitar
- Kimberley Rew – lead guitar, vocals, lead vocals on "Going Down to Liverpool" and "Don't Take Her Out of My World"
- Vince de la Cruz – bass, vocals
- Alex Cooper – drums, vocals

Additional musicians

- Nick Glennie-Smith – organ (1–21)
- Kevin Flanagan – saxophone (1–10)
- Alan Chaney – organ (11–23)
- Eamon Fitzpatrick – brass (11–23)
- Ed Briant – brass (11–23)
- Chris Clarke – brass (11–23)
- David Land – brass (11–23)
- Wendy Nicholl – background vocals (11–21)

Technical

- Pat Collier – producer, engineer, mixing
- Katrina and the Waves – producer
- Graemme Brown – CD mastering, audio restoration (at Zen Mastering, Vancouver)
- Ron Obvious – analog to digital transfers (at Warehouse Studios, Vancouver)
- Rieuwert Buitenga – Shepperton Studios live analog restoration
- Kimberley Rew – tape research and initial transfers
- Ralph Alfonso – CD design, liner notes, interviews
