= Walk on Water (Katrina and the Waves album) =

Studio album by Katrina and the Waves
- Released: 1997
- Recorded: 1997
- Studios: Remote Farm Studios, UK
- Genre: Pop rock
- Length: 37:04
- Label: Warner Music
- Producer: Mike Nocito

Katrina and the Waves chronology
Turnaround (1994)	Walk on Water (1997)	Walking on Sunshine – The Greatest Hits of Katrina and the Waves (1997)

Singles from Walk on Water
- 1. "Love Shine a Light" Released: 28 April 1997; 2. "Walk on Water" Released: 1997

Professional ratings
Review scores
Source	Rating
Aftonbladet	2/5 stars
AllMusic	3/5 stars

Walk on Water is the ninth studio album (their tenth and final overall) by the British band Katrina and the Waves, released in 1997 (see 1997 in music). The album includes the lead single "Love Shine a Light", the winning song of the Eurovision Song Contest 1997. It also became the band's highest charting UK single, reaching number 3. However, it was not released in the United States as a single.

The track "Eejay" contains a sample of the 1962 song "Something's Got a Hold on Me" by American singer Etta James, who is credited as a co-writer along with the song's other two writers.

== Track listing ==
All tracks are written by Kimberley Rew, except where noted.

No.	Title	Writer(s)	Length
1.	"Love Shine a Light"		2:52
2.	"Take a Little Piece"		3:26
3.	"Since You’ve Been Mine"		3:37
4.	"Walk on Water"	Rew, Katrina Leskanich, Vince de la Cruz, Alex Cooper	4:08
5.	"Eejay"	Rew, Leskanich, Etta James, Leroy Kirkland, Pearl Woods	3:05
6.	"Shakin’ in One Spot"		4:45
7.	"The Better You Love"		3:41
8.	"Love or Nothing"		3:40
9.	"Girl With Blue Eyes"		2:06
10.	"Don’t Keep Me Knocking"		5:32
Total length:			37:04

Japanese edition bonus tracks
No.	Title	Origin	Length
11.	"Love Shine a Light" (Xenomania Club Mix)	B-side to "Love Shine a Light"	7:09
12.	"Going Down to Liverpool"	B-side to "Walk on Water"; Walking on Sunshine, 1983	3:44
Total length:			47:57

2015 Expanded Edition bonus tracks (digital download)
No.	Title	Writer(s)	Origin	Length
11.	"Love Shine a Light" (Unplugged version)		B-side to "Love Shine a Light"	2:53
12.	"Walk on Water" (Acoustic version)	Rew, Leskanich, de la Cruz, Cooper	B-side to "Walk on Water"	5:10
13.	"Going Down to Liverpool"		B-side to "Walk on Water"; Walking on Sunshine	3:44
14.	"Spiderman"		B-side to "Love Shine a Light"; Walking on Sunshine	3:12
15.	"Love Shine a Light" (Xenomania Club Mix)		B-side to "Love Shine a Light"	7:09
Total length:				59:35

== Personnel ==
Adapted from the album's liner notes.

Katrina and the Waves

- Katrina Leskanich – lead vocals, guitar
- Kimberley Rew – guitar, vocals, lead vocals on "The Better You Love" and "Girl With Blue Eyes"
- Vince de la Cruz – bass, vocals
- Alex Cooper – drums, vocals

Additional musicians

- Don Airey – keyboards, string arrangements

Technical

- Mike Nocito – producer, mixing
- Squid Inc. – design, art direction
- Simon Fowler – photography
- Strings recorded at Angel Recording Studios, London
- Mastered at the Townhouse, London

== Charts ==
Chart (1997)	Peak position
Austrian Albums (Ö3 Austria Top 40)	47
Dutch Albums (Dutch Charts)	38
