= Shock Horror! =

Studio album by The Waves
- Released: 1983
- Recorded: 1981–1982
- Studios: Silo Studios (London); Alaska Studios (London)
- Genres: New wave; pop rock
- Length: 22:14
- Label: Aftermath
- Producers: Richard Bishop; Pat Collier

The Waves chronology
Shock Horror! (1983)	Walking on Sunshine (1983)

Singles from Shock Horror!
- 1. "Brown Eyed Son" Released: August 1982

Professional ratings
Review scores
Source	Rating
AllMusic	3.5/5 stars
Trouser Press	positive

Shock Horror! is a mini-album and the first release by English new wave band Katrina and the Waves, released in 1983 by Aftermath Records. The album was originally credited to the Waves and released only in the UK, later reissued for the first time on CD by US label CGB in 2010. The album was recorded by the band that became Katrina and the Waves, but prior to Katrina Leskanich's becoming the band's sole lead vocalist. Shock Horror! is notable for including the first recording of "Going Down to Liverpool," which was later recorded by the band with Leskanich on lead vocals, and covered by the Bangles.

== Background ==
The Waves were originally a band that guitarist Kimberley Rew and drummer Alex Cooper started in 1975 in Cambridge, England. The band made a few recordings, but nothing was released at the time. Four tracks recorded in 1976 were later added as bonus tracks to the 2010 reissue of Shock Horror! This early version of the Waves disbanded when Rew joined the Soft Boys in 1977. Cooper had joined Mama's Cookin' in 1979, a pop/soul cover band that featured singer Katrina Leskanich, guitarist Vince de la Cruz, and bassist Bob Jakins. After the break-up of the Soft Boys in 1981, Rew re-connected with Cooper, who convinced Rew to join Mama's Cookin', which was soon renamed the Waves.

Rew brought original material to the band, which he sang himself during the band's first year. Leskanich only sang lead on the Waves' repertoire of covers, but gradually Rew began writing songs specifically for her to sing, and by the time of their first full-length album, 1983's Walking on Sunshine, Leskanich was the band's main vocalist. In 1981–1982, the Waves did a number of recording sessions, which resulted in the 1982 singles "The Nightmare" and "Brown Eyed Son", released by Armageddon and Albion Records, respectively. Along with its B-side, "Hey, War Pig!", "The Nightmare" was included later the same year on Rew's solo album The Bible of Bop. "Brown Eyed Son" and most of the remainder of the sessions were released as Shock Horror! on the Aftermath label. The sessions took place while the Waves lineup was in transition, and only two songs on Shock Horror! feature original bassist Bob Jakins, who left the band between the two single releases. Guitarist Vince de la Cruz subsequently took on bass duties.

Released only in England, Shock Horror! contains the first recorded version of "Going Down to Liverpool", which was re-recorded for the first Katrina and the Waves album, Walking on Sunshine, and then re-recorded again for their Capitol Records debut in 1985, this time with Leskanich on lead vocals. "Brown Eyed Son" would also be re-recorded for Walking on Sunshine.

== Critical reception ==
Mark Deming, writing for AllMusic, wrote that Shock Horror! "captures the Waves as they were still knocking their sound into shape, but the strength of Rew's songwriting and guitar work was already clear, and drummer Alex Cooper obviously had enough power to drive a locomotive." Deming concluded that, "Shock Horror! sounds a long way from the work of a group that would become an international hitmaker, but the band obviously had talent and promise, and a stronger command of the studio would come with time."

Trouser Press singled out the track "Strolling on Air," calling it "an especially rich find." They noted, "The other tunes (except for an MC5-ish raver, "Atomic Rock 'n' Roll") are typically engaging but not particularly well recorded. Interesting and certainly no embarrassment."

== Track listing ==
All tracks are written by Kimberley Rew.

Side A
No.	Title	Length
1.	"Going Down to Liverpool"	3:33
2.	"Strolling on Air"	2:29
3.	"Riding My Bike"	3:11
4.	"I Caught the Milk Train (She Took the Deux Chevaux)"	3:31

Side B
No.	Title	Length
5.	"Brown Eyed Son"	2:11
6.	"You Can't Stand Next to Judie"	2:42
7.	"Atomic Rock 'n' Roll"	2:23
8.	"Saturday Week"	2:14
Total length:		22:14

2010 reissue bonus tracks
No.	Title	Length
9.	"Emerald" (previously unreleased)	4:04
10.	"The Ship" (previously unreleased)	4:33
11.	"My Friend Consuelo" (previously unreleased)	6:49
12.	"My Love's an Actress" (previously unreleased)	4:46
Total length:		42:26

== Personnel ==
Adapted from the 2010 reissue liner notes.

The Waves

- Kimberley Rew – lead vocals (1–6), lead guitar
- Katrina Leskanich – lead vocals (7, 8), co-lead vocals (5, 6), rhythm guitar (1, 4–8), background vocals (2, 3)
- Vince de la Cruz – bass guitar (1, 4–8), rhythm guitar (2, 3)
- Alex Cooper – drums
- Bob Jakins – bass guitar (2, 3)

Technical

- Richard Bishop – production (1, 4–8)
- Pat Collier – production (2, 3), engineering (2, 3)
- Nick Cook – engineering (1, 4–8)

Bonus tracks

- Kimberley Rew – guitar
- Alex Cooper – drums
- Rob Kelly – lead vocals, bass guitar
- Gary Lucas – engineering
- Mike Kemp – engineering

== Recording information ==
Silo Studios, London, 1982

- Tracks: "Going Down to Liverpool", "I Caught the Milk Train (She Took the Deux Chevaux)", "Brown Eyed Son", "You Can't Stand Next to Judie", "Atomic Rock 'n' Roll", "Saturday Week"

("She Loves to Groove" was also recorded at the session and used as B-side to the "Brown Eyed Son" single. It was included as a bonus track on the 2010 reissue of Walking on Sunshine and also re-recorded for Katrina and the Waves 2 in 1984)
Alaska Studios, London, 1981

- Tracks: "Strolling on Air", "Riding My Bike"

("I'm Amazed" and "Give Me Some of that Love" were also recorded at the session and later included as bonus tracks on the 2010 reissue of The Bible of Bop)
Spaceward Studios, Cambridge, 1976

- Tracks: "Emerald", "The Ship", "My Friend Consuelo", "My Love's an Actress"

(All four bonus tracks are previously unreleased)
