= Waves (Katrina and the Waves album) =

Studio album by Katrina and the Waves
- Released: 1986
- Recorded: January 1986
- Studios: Greenhouse Studio, London; Westside Studios, London
- Genre: New wave
- Length: 37:48
- Labels: Capitol; Attic (Canada)
- Producers: Katrina and the Waves; Pat Collier; Scott Litt

Katrina and the Waves chronology
Katrina and the Waves (1985)	Waves (1986)	Break of Hearts (1989)

Singles from Waves
- 1. "Is That It?" Released: March 1986; 2. "Sun Street" Released: June 1986; 3. "Tears for Me" Released: July 1986 (Australia); 4. "Lovely Lindsey" Released: October 1986

Waves is the fourth studio album by new wave band Katrina and the Waves, released in 1986 by Capitol Records. It followed their US and UK Top 30 album Katrina and the Waves (1985), reaching No. 49 on Billboard 200 and No. 70 on the UK Albums Chart. Waves sold less than half of what its predecessor had, generating a modest hit with the single "Sun Street" (UK No. 22).

== Reception ==
Professional ratings
Review scores
Source	Rating
AllMusic	3/5 stars
Robert Christgau	A−
The Rolling Stone Album Guide	2.5/5 stars

In a retrospective review for AllMusic, Matthew Greenwald wrote that although Waves is "not a disaster by any stretch," it's certainly not up to the standards of their previous album Katrina and the Waves. Part of this, according to Greenwald, is because main songwriter Kimberley Rew only contributed two songs to the album. Greenwald felt that there are some fine moments, however, such as Vince de la Cruz's "Sun Street" and Katrina Leskanich's "Tears for Me." He added that Rew's two songs, "Is That It" and "Lovely Lindsay," are "mini-masterpieces", and that they "eventually push the group and this album somewhere near the goal line." In his artist biography on AllMusic, Bruce Eder wrote that Waves was a good enough album but no improvement upon the Katrina and the Waves album. He also felt that the band's work lost its edge between the two albums.

== Track listing ==
No.	Title	Writer(s)	Length
1.	"Is That It?"	Kimberley Rew	3:40
2.	"Tears for Me"	Katrina Leskanich	3:02
3.	"Sun Street"	Vince de la Cruz	3:10
4.	"Lovely Lindsey"	Rew	4:45
5.	"Riding Shotgun"	Leskanich	3:38
6.	"Sleep on My Pillow"	de la Cruz	5:19
7.	"Money Chain"	de la Cruz	3:50
8.	"Mr. Star"	Leskanich	3:12
9.	"Love That Boy"	Leskanich	3:21
10.	"Stop Trying to Prove (How Much of a Man You Is)"	Leskanich	3:17

== Personnel ==
Katrina and the Waves

- Katrina Leskanich – vocals, rhythm guitar
- Kimberley Rew – lead guitar, vocals
- Vince de la Cruz – bass, rhythm guitar, lead guitar (7), vocals
- Alex Cooper – drums, vocals

Additional musicians

- Nick Glennie-Smith – keyboards
- John "Irish" Earle – brass
- Dave Land – brass
- Richard Edwards – brass
- Eamon Fitzpatrick – brass arrangements

Technical

- Katrina and the Waves – producer
- Pat Collier – producer
- Scott Litt – producer
- Richard Sullivan – second engineer
- Bob Ludwig – mastering
- Stylorouge – sleeve artwork
- Terry Day – hand colouring
- Simon Fowler – photography

== Charts ==
Chart (1986)	Peak position
Australia (Kent Music Report)	92
Canada (Canadian Albums Chart)	35
Finland (The Official Finnish Charts)	17
Norway (VG-lista)	12
Sweden (Sverigetopplistan)	3
UK (UK Albums Chart)	70
US (Billboard 200)	49

Singles

Year	Single	Peak position					
Year	Single	AUS	CAN	IRE	NED	UK	US
1986	"Is That It?"	82	25	—	—	82	70
1986	"Sun Street"	—	—	19	46	22	—
"—" denotes items that did not chart or were not released in that territory.

== Certifications ==
Region	Certification	Certified units/sales
Canada (Music Canada)	Gold	50,000^{^}
^{^} Shipments figures based on certification alone.
