= Walking on Sunshine (Katrina and the Waves album) =

Studio album by Katrina and the Waves
- Released: 1 December 1983
- Recorded: 1983
- Studios: Alaska Studios, London
- Genres: New wave; pop rock
- Length: 29:21
- Label: Attic
- Producer: Pat Collier

Katrina and the Waves chronology
Shock Horror! (1983)	Walking on Sunshine (1983)	Katrina and the Waves 2 (1984)

Singles from Walking on Sunshine
- 1. "Walking on Sunshine" Released: 1983; 2. "Que Te Quiero" Released: 1983

Alternative cover
- 1983 UK version and 2010 reissue by CGB

Walking on Sunshine is the debut, full-length studio album by English new wave band Katrina and the Waves, released on 1 December 1983, by Attic Records. The album was only officially released in Canada, but now appears worldwide on the 2003 compilation The Original Recordings 1983–1984. Several of these original 1983 vinyl releases are evidently still in circulation, primarily in the band's native UK, with the record being simply titled Katrina and the Waves (recognizable by the black and white cover, and not to be confused with the band's self-titled 1985 album, which contains revamped tracks from this and the following album, Katrina and the Waves 2). The same cover for this UK release was used when the album was remastered and re-released with four bonus tracks on CD in 2010, under the title Katrina and the Waves. To complicate things further, a later greatest hits album by the band is also called Walking on Sunshine. "Que Te Quiero" was released as a single in the UK where it reached #84 on the UK Singles Chart in January 1984.

This album contains the original version of the title track, which would be re-recorded two years later and thereupon become the band's biggest US hit.

== Background ==
Walking on Sunshine was recorded in London at Alaska Studios with engineer and producer Pat Collier, former bassist with the Vibrators. "I had a small studio in a rehearsal room ... I was recording indie records, and that's how I met Kimberley when he was in the Soft Boys," Collier said. Located in a railway arch under Waterloo Station, the studio was noisy and damp, and "very horrible," according to Collier. "They would always record as an entire band," he said. "They might patch and repair stuff after. They would always do the vocal again. But the basic thing was live."

The album, which was originally intended to be sold at gigs and to shop around for a record deal, cost $1,200 to make, which the band put up themselves. Labels in the UK and the US were approached, but only Canadian indie label Attic Records, which had previously released recordings by guitarist Kimberley Rew's former band the Soft Boys, responded with an offer. Consequently, Walking On Sunshine was released only in Canada, despite the band being based in the UK. Critical praise and radio airplay, for the title track in particular, resulted in a Canadian tour.

"Going Down to Liverpool", "Machine Gun Smith", "Walking on Sunshine" and "Que Te Quiero" would be re-recorded for the band's 1985 major label debut Katrina and the Waves, while "I Really Taught Me to Watusi" would be reworked for their 1991 album Pet the Tiger.

== Critical reception ==
Professional ratings
Review scores
Source	Rating
AllMusic	4/5 stars
The Rolling Stone Album Guide	4/5 stars
Trouser Press	very favourable

AllMusic's Mark Deming retrospectively called it "a good pop album," and wrote: "Kimberley Rew's guitar work is as stellar as ever, and his songwriting is clever and taut on each of these ten tunes." The Rolling Stone Album Guide called it "a masterpiece of guitar pop," and Trouser Press said that it "flows magnificently from start to end, and subsumes individual accomplishments into a true group effort. A greatest hits album the first time out."

== Reissue ==
Walking on Sunshine was reissued in 2010 on the CGB label in a limited edition of 1000 copies, each individually numbered. It includes previously unreleased material and all tracks have been remastered from the original master tapes. The booklet includes detailed recording credits, band interviews, rare photos, and liner notes by former Attic Records employee Ralph Alfonso, who got the band signed to the label in 1983. The cover art to the album is the self-released version that the band sold at gigs in the UK before signing with Attic.

== Track listing ==
All tracks are written by Kimberley Rew, except where noted.

No.	Title	Length
1.	"Dancing Street"	2:24
2.	"Spiderman"	3:12
3.	"Going Down to Liverpool"	3:45
4.	"Machine Gun Smith"	2:55
5.	"Walking on Sunshine"	3:15
6.	"Brown Eyed Son"	2:03
7.	"Que Te Quiero"	3:17
8.	"Don't Take Her Out of My World"	2:53
9.	"I Really Taught Me to Watusi"	3:02
10.	"Ain't No Money (Buy You Love)"	2:35
Total length:		29:21

2010 reissue bonus tracks
No.	Title	Writer(s)	Origin	Length
11.	"Wipe Out"	Bob Berryhill; Pat Connolly; Jim Fuller; Ron Wilson	B-side to "Brown Eyed Son" reissue single, 1991	2:22
12.	"I Want a Man"		Previously unreleased	2:05
13.	"She Loves to Groove" (7" version)		B-side to "Brown Eyed Son" single, 1982	2:37
14.	"Help Me"		Previously unreleased	3:08
Total length:				39:33

Notes

- An earlier recording of "Brown Eyed Son" was released as a one-off single for Albion Records in 1982, when the band was still called the Waves. Together with an earlier recording of "Going Down to Liverpool", it was included on the Waves' mini-album Shock Horror!.
- "Wipe Out" and "She Loves to Groove" were recorded in 1982 at Silo Studios in London.

== Personnel ==
Katrina and the Waves

- Katrina Leskanich – lead vocals, rhythm guitar
- Kimberley Rew – lead guitar, background vocals (all tracks); lead vocals (tracks 3, 8, 13)
- Vince de la Cruz – bass guitar
- Alex Cooper – drums

Additional musicians

- Nick Glennie-Smith – organ
- Kevin Flanagan – saxophone

Technical

- Pat Collier – production, engineering, mixing
- Richard Bishop – production (tracks 11, 13)
- Nick Cook – production (tracks 11, 13)
- John de la Cruz – photography
