= Everything (The Bangles album) =

Studio album by the Bangles
- Released: October 18, 1988
- Recorded: July 1987 – July 1988
- Studio: Ocean Way (Hollywood); Studio 55 (Los Angeles)
- Genre: Pop rock; jangle pop
- Length: 47:36
- Label: Columbia
- Producer: Davitt Sigerson

The Bangles chronology
Different Light (1986)	Everything (1988)	Greatest Hits (1990)

Singles from Everything
- 1. "In Your Room" Released: October 1988; 2. "Eternal Flame" Released: January 23, 1989; 3. "Be with You" Released: April 1989; 4. "I'll Set You Free" Released: October 1989 (UK)

Everything is the third studio album by American pop rock band the Bangles. It was released on October 18, 1988 through Columbia Records. Just like its predecessor, Everything produced a US Top 5 hit ("In Your Room"), and a number one single, "Eternal Flame", which became a chart-topper in almost every major country around the world.

The 2008 CD reissue on the Wounded Bird label (WOU 4056) adds a bonus track: "In Your Room" (12" Remix). Two songs that were recorded for the album but not included were "What I Meant to Say", written by Debbi and Vicki Peterson and sung by the former, which was released as the B-side of "Eternal Flame", as well as "Everything I Wanted", co-written and sung by Susanna Hoffs and released in 1990 on Greatest Hits.

Despite its chart success, Everything failed to meet sales expectations. It subsequently became the group's last album before their nine-year hiatus from 1989 to 1998.

== Critical reception ==
Professional ratings
Review scores
Source	Rating
AllMusic	3.5/5 stars
Chicago Sun-Times	3/4 stars
Los Angeles Times	3/4 stars
NME	4/10
Number One	4/5 stars
Q	3/5 stars
Rolling Stone	3/5 stars
Smash Hits	6/10
Spin Alternative Record Guide	4/10
The Village Voice	B−

In their review, Billboard commented that Everything "should do the trick again for the quartet" following the success of the Bangles' previous album Different Light, adding that Davitt Sigerson's production "gets the most out of the band, whose trademark harmonies are as bright as ever; playing and songwriting are uniformly fine." Cashbox noted the influence of Alex Chilton, the Beatles, and the Mamas & the Papas and described Everything as "more of the same – go-go '60s girl-guitar-pop with sweet harmonies and plentiful hooks – which is a blessing for radio listeners everywhere. The lead vocals are democratically distributed, but all the tunes are good to excellent."

Rolling Stone critic Jimmy Guterman commented, "Bangle members wrote or co-wrote everything on Everything, and new producer Davitt Sigerson, who helped David and David make their dark visions palatable to the masses, encourages the Bangles to kick hard into their songs ... by taking more chances, the Bangles sound more comfortable than they have since their 1982 EP Bangles ... their harmonies are the clearest and most evocative they've ever been – their voices float, coalesce and soar. The only problem is the lyrics. The Bangles are indeed comfortable on Everything, but the flip side to being comfortable is being complacent. The words of 'Bell Jar,' 'Glitter Years' and several other songs circle around ideas without zeroing in, settling for cliché when they give up on precision. But the lyrics are balanced by the strong music, which is everything the quartet wants it to be."

== Track listing ==
No.	Title	Writer(s)	Lead vocals	Length
1.	"In Your Room"	Susanna Hoffs, Tom Kelly, Billy Steinberg	Hoffs	3:33
2.	"Complicated Girl"	Michael Steele, David White	Steele	3:43
3.	"Bell Jar"	Debbi Peterson, Vicki Peterson	V. Peterson	3:23
4.	"Something to Believe In"	Eric Lowen, Dan Navarro, Steele, White	Steele	4:02
5.	"Eternal Flame"	Hoffs, Kelly, Steinberg	Hoffs	3:56
6.	"Be with You"	Walker Igleheart, D. Peterson	D. Peterson	3:05
7.	"Glitter Years"	Steele, White	Steele	3:44
8.	"I'll Set You Free"	Hoffs, Lowen, Navarro	Hoffs	4:32
9.	"Watching the Sky"	Hoffs, V. Peterson	V. Peterson	4:17
10.	"Some Dreams Come True"	Igleheart, D. Peterson	D. Peterson	3:33
11.	"Make a Play for Her Now"	V. Peterson, Vinnie Vincent	V. Peterson	3:53
12.	"Waiting for You"	Hoffs, Kelly, Steinberg	Hoffs	3:41
13.	"Crash and Burn"	V. Peterson, Rachel Sweet	V. Peterson	2:42

== Personnel ==
The Bangles

- Susanna Hoffs – lead and backing vocals, guitars, percussion
- Vicki Peterson – lead and backing vocals, lead and rhythm guitars, mandolin
- Michael Steele – bass, lead and backing vocals, guitars, percussion
- Debbi Peterson – drums, percussion, lead and backing vocals

Additional musicians

- Darryl Citizen – "noise"
- Paulinho da Costa – percussion
- Bobby Donati – guitar on "Some Dreams Come True"
- Vinnie Vincent – 12-string guitar on "Make a Play for Her Now"
- Tommy Morgan – harmonica
- Jim Snodgrass – tabla
- David Lindley – classical guitar, bouzouki, saz, dobro
- John Philip Shenale – keyboards, programming
- Walker Igleheart – keyboards, programming
- David White – keyboards, programming
- William Jones – sitar (uncredited)

== Production ==
- Producer – Davitt Sigerson
- A&R – Ron Oberman
- Engineer – John Beverly Jones
- Additional Recording – Ken Felton
- Assistant Engineers – Ken Felton and Joe Schiff
- Recorded at Ocean Way Recording and Studio 55 (Los Angeles, CA).
- Mixed by Frank Filipetti at Studio 55.
- Mastered by Doug Sax at The Mastering Lab (Los Angeles, CA).
- Art Direction – Nancy Donald and Tony Lane
- Artwork – Lesley Schiff
- Logo Design – David Coleman
- Photography – Sheila Rock
- Management – Miles Copeland III, Ian Lloyd-Bisley and Pamela Turbov at Firstars, Inc.

== Charts ==
=== Weekly charts ===
Weekly chart performance for Everything
Chart (1989)	Peak position
Australian Albums (ARIA)	7
Austrian Albums (Ö3 Austria)	8
Canada Top Albums/CDs (RPM)	32
Dutch Albums (Album Top 100)	4
European Albums (Music & Media)	14
Finnish Albums (Suomen virallinen lista)	37
German Albums (Offizielle Top 100)	15
New Zealand Albums (RMNZ)	15
Swedish Albums (Sverigetopplistan)	20
Swiss Albums (Schweizer Hitparade)	10
UK Albums (OCC)	5
US Billboard 200	15
US Cash Box Top 200 Albums	20

=== Year-end charts ===
Year-end chart performance for Everything
Chart (1989)	Position
Australian Albums (ARIA)	44
Austrian Albums (Ö3 Austria)	27
Dutch Albums (Album Top 100)	36
European Albums (Music & Media)	49
German Albums (Offizielle Top 100)	72
New Zealand Albums (RMNZ)	25
UK Albums (Gallup)	47
US Billboard 200	33

== Certifications ==
Certifications for Everything
Region	Certification	Certified units/sales
Australia (ARIA)	Platinum	70,000^{^}
Canada (Music Canada)	Platinum	100,000^{^}
France (SNEP)	Gold	100,000^{*}
New Zealand (RMNZ)	Gold	7,500^{^}
Spain (PROMUSICAE)	Gold	50,000^{^}
Switzerland (IFPI Switzerland)	Gold	25,000^{^}
United Kingdom (BPI)	Platinum	300,000^{^}
United States (RIAA)	Platinum	1,000,000^{^}
^{*} Sales figures based on certification alone.^{^} Shipments figures based on certification alone.
