= Break of Hearts (album) =

Studio album by Katrina and the Waves
- Released: July 26, 1989
- Recorded: 1988–1989
- Studios: Utopia Studios, London; The Lodge, Clare, Suffolk; Brook House, Suffolk
- Genres: Rock; pop rock
- Length: 40:22
- Labels: SBK; Attic (Canada)
- Producers: Katrina and the Waves; Jay Burnett

Katrina and the Waves chronology
Waves (1986)	Break of Hearts (1989)	Pet the Tiger (1991)

Professional ratings
Review scores
Source	Rating
AllMusic	2/5 stars
The Rolling Stone Album Guide	2/5 stars

Break of Hearts is the fifth studio album by rock band Katrina and the Waves, released in 1989. It is their last album to reach the Billboard 200, reaching No. 122, and contains their last top 40 hit in the United States, "That's the Way", which reached No. 16. It was their last studio album released in the United States and the first and only release for the SBK label (the band would briefly move to Virgin Records just before it was sold to Capitol's then-owner EMI).

== Background and critical reception ==
After being dropped by Capitol Records following 1986's Waves album, Katrina and the Waves secured a new deal with SBK Records, which released the more rock-oriented Break of Hearts. Despite a US Top 20 hit with "That's the Way", it was their only album for the label. Singer Katrina Leskanich said on the band's website, "SBK told us that they could see us as a stadium band, Bryan Adams style, and [guitarist Kimberley Rew] was coming up with this stuff that was perfect for rock radio." Retrospective reviews were less than positive. Trouser Press described the album as a "horrendously wrongheaded comeback bid that shows the Waves to be utterly oblivious to their own strengths," calling it "bland, overprocessed commercial slop." The Rolling Stone Album Guide felt that the writing was "empty and mannered." Rew was quoted on the website saying, "We've never been successful enough to be immune from the influences of producers and marketing men ... the more we fell for those 80s trademarks, the more we diluted the band." The album's closing track "Rock Myself to Sleep" (written by Rew and de la Cruz) was previously recorded in 1985 by April Wine on their album Walking Through Fire and Starship on their debut album Knee Deep in the Hoopla.

== Track listing ==
All tracks are written by Alex Cooper, Vince de la Cruz, Katrina Leskanich and Kimberley Rew, except where noted.

No.	Title	Writer(s)	Length
1.	"Rock n' Roll Girl"		4:06
2.	"Can't Tame My Love"		4:00
3.	"That's the Way"	Leskanich, Rew	3:56
4.	"Keep Running to Me"	Rew	4:29
5.	"Break of Hearts"		5:05
6.	"I Can Dream About It"	Leskanich, Rew	4:00
7.	"To Have and to Hold"	Rew	4:20
8.	"(I've Got a) Crush On You"		3:55
9.	"Love Calculator"	Leskanich, Rew	3:58
10.	"Rock Myself to Sleep"	de la Cruz, Rew	3:07
Total length:			40:22

== Personnel ==
Credits adapted from the album's liner notes.

Katrina and the Waves

- Katrina Leskanich – vocals, rhythm guitar
- Kimberley Rew – lead guitar, vocals, keyboards
- Vince de la Cruz – bass, additional guitars, vocals, keyboards
- Alex Cooper – drums, vocals, keyboards

Additional musicians

- Nick Glennie-Smith – additional keyboards
- Stevie Lange – backing vocals
- Shirley Lewis – backing vocals
- Dee Lewis – backing vocals
- Jimmy Helms – backing vocals
- George Chandler – backing vocals
- Jimmy Chambers – backing vocals

Technical

- Katrina and the Waves – producer
- Jay Burnett – additional production, engineer, mixing
- Stephen Stewart – engineer
- Mark Sayer-Wade – engineer
- Mike Vindice – additional engineer
- Dennis Herman – additional engineer
- Pat Collier – additional engineer
- Sarah Jarman – assistant engineer
- Simon Lee – assistant engineer
- Vicente Roix – assistant engineer
- Nigel Green – mixing
- Paul Cox – front cover photography
- Robin Emilien – back cover photography

== Charts ==
Chart (1989)	Peak position
The Billboard 200	122

Singles

Year	Single	Chart	Position
1989	"That's the Way"	The Billboard Hot 100	16
1989	"That's the Way"	UK Singles Chart	84
1989	"Rock n' Roll Girl"	UK Singles Chart	93
