= Pet the Tiger =

Studio album by Katrina and the Waves
- Released: 1991
- Studios: Good Luck Studios, London
- Genre: Pop rock
- Length: 38:26
- Label: Virgin
- Producers: Gordon Bennet; Bob Andrews

Katrina and the Waves chronology
Break of Hearts (1989)	Pet the Tiger (1991)	Edge of the Land (1993)

Singles from Pet the Tiger
- 1. "Pet the Tiger" Released: 1991; 2. "Tears of a Woman" Released: 1991; 3. "Birkenhead Garbage Pickers" Released: 1992

Pet the Tiger is the sixth studio album by rock band Katrina and the Waves, released in 1991 by Virgin Records. It was the band's only release on the label after signing with Virgin Germany, before moving to Polydor Records for their next two albums. The album features two songwriting collaborations with Liam Sternberg, writer of the Bangles' "Walk Like an Egyptian", and production and musical contributions from keyboardist Bob Andrews (Brinsley Schwarz, Graham Parker and the Rumour).

The album charted in the Swedish albums chart at number 48.

== Track listing ==
No.	Title	Writer(s)	Length
1.	"Birkenhead Garbage Pickers"	Kimberley Rew	3:45
2.	"Tin Horse"	Liam Sternberg, Katrina Leskanich, Vince de la Cruz, Alex Cooper	4:30
3.	"Pet The Tiger"	Rew, Sternberg, Leskanich, de la Cruz	3:57
4.	"Tears of a Woman"	Rew, Leskanich	3:57
5.	"I'll Do Anything"	Rew	4:35
6.	"I Really Taught Me to Watusi"	Rew, de la Cruz	3:42
7.	"S.W.A.L.K."	Rew	3:37
8.	"Blue Water Blues"	Rew, Leskanich, de la Cruz, Cooper	3:57
9.	"I Caught the Milktrain (He Took the Deux Cheveaux)"	Rew, de la Cruz	3:25
10.	"I Can't Stand Myself (Whenever You're Near Me)"	Rew	3:23

== Personnel ==
Credits adapted from the album's liner notes.

Katrina and the Waves

- Katrina Leskanich – vocals, guitar
- Kimberley Rew – guitar, vocals
- Vince de la Cruz – bass, guitar, vocals
- Alex Cooper – drums, vocals

Additional musicians

- Tim Lee – Hammond organ
- Bob Andrews – Hammond organ and keyboards on 4

Technical

- Gordon Bennet – producer (except 4), mixing (8)
- Bob Andrews – producer (4), co-producer (3)
- Stephen Stewart – engineer, mixing (4)
- Ted Hayton – mixing (except 2–4, 8)
- Matthew Ellard – assistant mixing engineer (except 2–4, 8)
- John Luongo – mixing (2, 3)
- Gary Hellman – mixing (2, 3)

== Charts ==
Chart (1991)	Peak position
Swedish Albums (Sverigetopplistan)	48
