= Be with You (The Bangles song) =

Single by The Bangles

from the album Everything
- A-side: "Be with You"
- B-side: "Let It Go"
- Released: April 1989 (US); May 1989 (UK)
- Recorded: 1988
- Genre: Pop rock
- Length: 3:02
- Label: CBS (United Kingdom)
- Songwriters: Walker Igleheart; Debbi Peterson
- Producer: Davitt Sigerson

The Bangles singles chronology
"Eternal Flame" (1989)	"Be with You" (1989)	"I'll Set You Free" (1989)

Music video
- "Be with You" on YouTube

"Be with You" is a song by The Bangles. Taken from their third album Everything (1988), it was released as a single in 1989.

== Credits ==
The song was composed by drummer Debbi Peterson and Walker Igleheart, and produced by Davitt Sigerson. Peterson sang lead vocals on the song, one of the only two A-sides upon which she did so (along with a cover of Katrina and The Waves "Going Down to Liverpool" in 1984). The track was remixed by Chris Lord-Alge for the single release. This is also their third consecutive Billboard Top 40 hit single written by at least one band member. The song reached #30 on Billboard in June 1989, becoming the last one to hit the charts, a situation that contributed more to the group's dissolution months later.

== Single ==
In the UK, its primary B-side was "Let It Go", from the band's 1986 album Different Light. The CD and 12" releases also included an extended version of "In Your Room".

The single version of "Be with You" was included on Greatest Hits (1990) and Best of The Bangles (1999, released only in Europe).

== Charts ==
Chart (1989)	Peak position
Australian Singles Chart	37
Austria (Ö3 Austria Top 40)	12
Canada Top Singles (RPM)	47
Europe (Eurochart Hot 100)	49
Finland (Suomen virallinen singlelista)	19
Germany (GfK)	32
Ireland (IRMA)	14
New Zealand (Recorded Music NZ)	41
Switzerland (Schweizer Hitparade)	19
UK Singles Chart	23
US Billboard Hot 100	30
US Cash Box	19
