= That's the Way =

That's the Way may refer to:

- "That's the Way", a song recorded by The Honeycombs in 1965
- "That's the Way", a song by Jennifer Lopez from her album J.Lo
- "That's the Way", a song by Katrina and the Waves from their album Break of Hearts
- "That's the Way" (1970 Led Zeppelin song)
- "That's the Way" (Jo Dee Messina song)
- "That's the Way (I Like It)", a song by KC and the Sunshine Band
- "That's the Way (My Love Is)", a song by The Smashing Pumpkins
- "That's the Way (I'm Only Trying to Help You)", a song by Culture Club from their album Colour by Numbers

== See also ==
- All pages beginning with That's the Way
