= Katrina and the Waves 2 =

Studio album by Katrina and the Waves
- Released: 1984
- Recorded: 1984
- Studios: Greenhouse; Alaska (London)
- Genre: New wave
- Length: 35:11
- Label: Attic
- Producers: Pat Collier; Katrina and the Waves

Katrina and the Waves chronology
Walking on Sunshine (1983)	Katrina and the Waves 2 (1984)	Katrina and the Waves (1985)

Katrina and the Waves 2 is the second studio album by English new wave band Katrina and the Waves, released in 1984. The album was originally only released in Canada on the Attic Records label. It was included on the 2003 compilation The Original Recordings 1983–1984, and also re-released with five bonus tracks in 2010 through the CGB label. Six of the album's songs would be reworked for the band's major label debut Katrina and the Waves.

The album outtake "That's Just the Woman in Me" was covered by Celine Dion in 2007 on her Taking Chances album.

== Reception ==
Professional ratings
Review scores
Source	Rating
AllMusic	3.5/5 stars
The Rolling Stone Album Guide	3/5 stars

Mark Deming, in a retrospective review for AllMusic, noted that the band had added a lot of "studio polish" to their sound on Katrina and the Waves 2. He wrote, "This was a good and a bad thing; the glossier production allows some of the finer details of Kimberley Rew's songwriting and guitar work to come to the surface, but the additional backing vocals, keyboards, and horns also clutter arrangements that had been lean and straightforward on their earlier recordings, and drummer Alex Cooper was asked to share percussion duties with a LinnDrum here, and as a result the music sounds stiffer and less energetic." Deming also noted that Rew, on tracks like "Cry for Me" and "The Game of Love", explored a "retro-styled pop sound that gave the recording a new twist."

Trouser Press wrote that, compared to the band's first album, Katrina and the Waves 2 "takes a harder-rocking bent, downplaying the tunefulness slightly to highlight jumping numbers like "She Loves to Groove," the nutty "Maniac House" and a powerful, Janis Joplin-like blues, "Cry for Me." They concluded that the album was "not as glorious as the debut, but a boss record nonetheless."

== Reissue ==
Katrina and the Waves 2 was reissued in 2010 on the CGB label in a limited edition of 1000 copies, each individually numbered. It includes previously unreleased material and all tracks have been remastered from the original master tapes. The booklet includes detailed recording credits, band interviews, rare photos, and liner notes by former Attic Records employee Ralph Alfonso, who got the band signed to the label in 1983.

== Track listing ==
All tracks are written by Kimberley Rew, except where noted.

No.	Title	Writer(s)	Length
1.	"Do You Want Crying"	Vince de la Cruz	4:02
2.	"Maniac House"		4:08
3.	"She Loves to Groove"		2:55
4.	"Cry for Me"		3:58
5.	"Red Wine and Whisky"		3:15
6.	"Mexico"	de la Cruz	2:50
7.	"One Woman"	de la Cruz	3:35
8.	"The Sun Won't Shine Without You"		3:54
9.	"He's a Charmer"		3:16
10.	"The Game of Love"		3:18
Total length:			35:11

2010 reissue bonus tracks
No.	Title	Writer(s)	Origin	Length
11.	"Wild Thing"	Chip Taylor	Album outtake; previously unreleased	2:28
12.	"River Deep, Mountain High"	Phil Spector; Jeff Barry; Ellie Greenwich	Album outtake; The Original Recordings 1983–1984, 2003	3:04
13.	"Plastic Man" (Single version)		Non-album single, 1984	3:32
14.	"That's Just the Woman in Me"		Album outtake; The Original Recordings 1983-1984	4:15
15.	"Yes Agatha"		1991 recording; previously unreleased	2:14
Total length:				50:44

Note

- "Yes Agatha" was recorded at Kimberley Rew's Remote Farm Studios, Cambridge in 1991. According to Rew, "recorded in what seemed like a novelty style at the time, but which actually makes it sound more like the earlier stuff."

== Personnel ==
Adapted from the album liner notes.

Katrina and the Waves

- Katrina Leskanich – vocals, rhythm guitar
- Kimberley Rew – lead guitar
- Vince de la Cruz – bass guitar
- Alex Cooper – drums

Additional musicians

- Nick Glennie-Smith – organ
- Alan Chaney – organ
- Eamon Fitzpatrick – brass
- Ed Briant – brass
- Chris Clarke – brass
- David Land – brass
- Wendy Nicholl – background vocals

Technical

- Pat Collier – production, engineering (1–14)
- Katrina and the Waves – production (1–12, 14)
- Steve Stewart – engineering (15)
- John de la Cruz – photography
- Randy Merrill – mastering (2010 reissue; at Masterdisk, March 2010)
