= I'll Set You Free =

- British cover.

Single by The Bangles

from the album Everything
- A-side: "I'll Set You Free"
- B-side: "Watching the Sky"
- Released: October 1989
- Recorded: 1988
- Genre: Pop rock, soft rock
- Length: 4:29 (Album Version); 4:51 (Greatest Hits Version); 4:09 (UK Single Version)
- Label: CBS (United Kingdom); Liberation (Australia)
- Songwriters: Eric Lowen; Dan Navarro; Susanna Hoffs
- Producer: Davitt Sigerson

The Bangles singles chronology
"Be with You" (1989)	"I'll Set You Free" (1989)	"Everything I Wanted" (1990)

Australian release

"I'll Set You Free" is a song by The Bangles. It first appeared on their third album Everything in 1988, and was later released as its fourth single in Europe in 1989 as a "goodbye" single to its fans. "I'll Set You Free" was released as a single in Australia in 1990 to promote their Greatest Hits.

== Personnel ==
The song was composed by guitarist and vocalist Susanna Hoffs with Eric Lowen and Dan Navarro, and produced by Davitt Sigerson.

The track was re-recorded and mixed by Bernard Edwards for release as a single, with additional engineering by Larry Alexander. The album version of the song runs to 4 minutes 27 seconds, and the single version lasts 24 seconds longer. As well as a thicker sound than the original recording, the single version has a more forceful introduction and a different lead vocal by Hoffs.

An edit of the single version was released in the United Kingdom, with a duration of 4:09.

== Single ==
In the UK its primary B-side was "Watching the Sky", another album track from Everything. The British 12" and CD singles also included a remix of "Walking Down Your Street" by David Kahne as a bonus track. In Australia the song was backed by "Everything I Wanted" — later released as a single in its own right in 1990 — and was housed in a different picture sleeve.

Unlike the preceding three singles from Everything, all of which had reached the UK Top 40, "I'll Set You Free" only reached number 74 in the United Kingdom. It was also a minor hit in Australia, reaching number 81 in July 1990. No promotional film was made for the single, as the band had broken up a few weeks earlier.

The single version of "I'll Set You Free" was included on Greatest Hits (1990) and Best of The Bangles (1999), though the album version was included on the vinyl version of Gold (2020).

The UK single version - which runs 4:09 - was included on the Bangles Japanese Singles Collection (2024).

== Reception ==
Writing in Rolling Stone in 1988, Jimmy Guterman wrote: "On numbers like "I'll Set You Free" and "Make a Play for Her Now", their harmonies are the clearest and most evocative they've ever been – their voices float, coalesce and soar".

== Covers ==
"I'll Set You Free" was covered by the song's songwriters, Eric Lowen & Dan Navarro, on their 1993 album Broken Moon. Their version featured Susanna Hoffs on backing vocals.

== Charts ==
Chart (1989)	Peak position
Australian Singles Chart	81
UK Singles (Official Charts)	74
