= Festival Too =

Music festival in King's Lynn, England

Festival Too is a free music festival held yearly in King's Lynn, Norfolk, in the East of England, running throughout July. It has been running since 1985. It is free for anyone to attend, and is funded by donations and through local business support. In the region of 60,000 attend over the three weeks, with headline night audiences reaching 12–14,000 every year allowing it to grow from a budget of around £5000 to around £250,000. The festival spans across three weeks with line-ups including well known acts, plus local music acts (such as Battle of the Bands winners). Since 2018 there has also been a Festival Too Fringe.

Some major acts who have performed at Festival Too include.

== Notable Acts ==
The festival is normally held across three weekends in July. The first weekend is held in King Staithe Square, while the final two weekends are held in the Tuesday Market Place. Notable acts normally appear across the final two weekends.

Due to the COVID-19 pandemic Festival Too did not take place in 2020 or 2021 but returned to both the King Staithe Square (for the first weekend) and the Tuesday Market Place (for the second and third weekend) in 2022.

=== 2026 ===
- Sleeper (band)
- The Hoosiers
- The Proclaimers

=== 2025 ===
- Ash (band)

=== 2024 ===
- Sigala
- Ocean Colour Scene
- The Boo Radleys
- Livin' Joy
- 911 (English group)
- Sandi Thom

=== 2023 ===
- Liberty X
- Example
- Newton Faulkner
- Feeder

=== 2022 ===
- K-Klass
- Rozalla
- Fleur East DJ Set
- Judge Jules
- Reef
- Heather Small
- Will Young

=== 2019 ===
- Judge Jules
- Nadine Coyle
- Cast
- 5ive
- Marti Pellow

=== 2018 ===
- Angelo Starr
- Pixie Lott
- The Sherlocks
- The Darkness

=== 2017 ===
- KT Tunstall
- Space
- Busted

=== 2016 ===
- Phats and Small
- The Vamps
- The Wonder Stuff
- Gabrielle

=== 2015 ===
- Heaven 17
- Bucks Fizz
- Republica
- Only the Young
- Dodgy
- The Fratellis

=== 2014 ===
- Katrina Leskanich
- Aswad
- Toploader
- Scouting for Girls

=== 2013 ===
- Gareth Gates
- Diana Vickers
- The Loveable Rogues
- Stooshe
- Blue

=== 2012 ===
- The Pigeon Detectives
- Brand New Heavies
- Soul II Soul
- Marcus Collins
- Ryan O'Shaughnessy
- Lemar

=== 2011 ===
- The Lightning Seeds
- Sophie Ellis-Bextor
- The Hoosiers
- The Feeling

=== 2010 ===
- Lemar
- The Wanted
- Hayseed Dixie
- The Beat

=== 2009 ===
- S Club 3
- Beverley Knight
