= Love Shine a Light =

1997 song by Katrina and the Waves

Single by Katrina and the Waves

from the album Walk on Water
- B-side: "Spiderman"
- Released: 28 April 1997
- Recorded: 1996
- Studio: Remote Farm
- Genre: Pop
- Length: 2:52
- Label: Eternal
- Songwriter: Kimberley Rew
- Producer: Mike Nocito

Katrina and the Waves singles chronology
"Walking on Sunshine" (1997)	"Love Shine a Light" (1997)	"Walk on Water" (1997)

Eurovision Song Contest 1997 entry
- Country: United Kingdom
- Artists: Katrina Leskanich; Kimberley Rew; Vince de la Cruz; Alex Cooper; Miriam Stockley
- As: Katrina & the Waves
- Language: English
- Composer: Kimberley Rew
- Lyricist: Kimberley Rew
- Conductor: Don Airey

Finals performance
- Final result: 1st
- Final points: 227

Entry chronology
- ◄ "Ooh Aah... Just a Little Bit" (1996)
- "Where Are You?" (1998) ►

Official performance video
- "Love Shine a Light" on YouTube

"Love Shine a Light" is a song by British rock band Katrina and the Waves written by Kimberley Rew and produced by Mike Nocito. It represented the United Kingdom in the Eurovision Song Contest 1997 held in Dublin, resulting in the country's fifth and most recent win at the contest. It was released as a single on 28 April 1997 and later included on the band's ninth studio album, Walk on Water (1997), serving as the album's lead single.

The song was the group's biggest success since their 1985 hit "Walking on Sunshine". It peaked within the top five of the charts in Austria, Ireland, Norway, the Netherlands, Sweden, and the United Kingdom. In 2022, it was named the best UK Eurovision entry by The Daily Telegraph.

== Background ==
=== Composition and Eurovision selection ===
The song was composed by the group's guitarist and regular songwriter Kimberley Rew following a request from the brother of the group's drummer Alex Cooper for an anthem for Samaritans in recognition of the thirtieth anniversary of the Swindon branch of that organization – Cooper's brother being a member of that branch. In a 1997 interview Katrina and the Waves lead vocalist Katrina Leskanich indicated that it was members of the Samaritans who opined that "Love Shine a Light" "was the type of song which would win the Eurovision Song Contest and [so] at the last minute, [Katrina and the Waves] submitted the song with our £250 [entrance fee]" for consideration to vie in the Great British Song Contest, the national preselection round organised by the British Broadcasting Corporation (BBC) to select its song and performer for the 42nd edition of the Eurovision Song Contest.

It was also reported that Carmina Cooper, the manager of Katrina and the Waves and Alex Cooper's wife, met up with BBC Radio Cambridgeshire's breakfast presenter (and Head of Music) Dan Chisholm to play the track for him: Chisholm's response was to urge that the number be entered in the Great British Song Contest, and after affording "Love Shine a Light" its radio airplay debut, Chisholm declared it "the song which will win this year's Eurovision Song Contest".

In a 2010 interview Leskanich would state that Great British Song Contest executive producer Jonathan King had in fact initiated Katrina and the Waves involvement in the Great British Contest as he had contacted Leskanich to ask if her group had a song which might be a suitable contender to vie for the UK entrant at Eurovision 1997. Leskanich would paraphrase her response to King as being: "Yes, we have this song called 'Love Shine A Light' which we’ve never put on a record because it's too cheesy, too ABBA, too Eurovision, so it would be perfect for you."

Leskanich stated in 2010 that the original plan was that an act other than Katrina and the Waves would be found to perform "Love Shine a Light" for Eurovision consideration but that Warner Bros. Records executive Steve Allan – who Leskanich describes as "a big Eurovision fan...it’s always been his dream to win it" – said: "Look, you guys have a name, we can still do business in Europe. All you need is a hit song, and we want you to do it. And if you do do it we’ll give you a record deal"; adds Leskanich: "So we couldn’t say no." Leskanich would also state that Kimberley Rew had said of Katrina and the Waves pursuing the Eurovision title with his composition: "I’m not having anything to do with it". The 9 March 1997 broadcast of the Great British Song Contest final featured a taped interview with Rew, in which he described Eurovision as "one of those great institutions of life"; he also accompanied Leskanich onstage to be congratulated for "Love Shine a Light"'s being announced as the British entrant for Eurovision 1997. However, he did not perform on stage for this appearance or the Eurovision final held on 3 May 1997.

In a 2020 interview, Leskanich revealed that she was asked if she could "try and talk like an English person" as some people were not happy with the UK being represented at the Eurovision Song Contest by an American artist. Leskanich had moved to the UK in 1976, at the age of 16, and had lived in the UK for more than two decades by the time of her Eurovision appearance.

One of eight songs aired in the Great British Song Contest semi-final broadcast on BBC Radio 2 on 7 February 1997, "Love Shine a Light" was one of four songs advanced by televote to the Great British Song Contest final. The Great British Song Contest final was a live performance show broadcast by BBC TV on 9 March 1997, at the conclusion of which "Love Shine a Light" was announced as the 1997 UK entrant in Eurovision, the song having received 69,834 televotes – 11,138 more than the second-place finisher.

=== Eurovision performance ===
On 3 May 1997, the Eurovision Song Contest was held at the Point Theatre in Dublin hosted by Radio Telefís Éireann (RTÉ), and broadcast live throughout the continent. Katrina and the Waves performed "Love Shine a Light" twenty-fourth in a field of twenty-five songs being preceded by the Croatian entry "Probudi me" and followed with the Icelandic entry "Minn hinsti dans".

Leskanich would later state she'd supplied her own outfit for her performance on Eurovision: "the boys [ie. the Waves] were getting beautiful suits made by William Hunt and my outfit was an afterthought. They came [in] with five different designers and every single outfit made me look like a clown or a chair cover...I ended up wearing this green blouse I’d been wearing all week that I’d bought in the Cambridge market for £3 [with] a [dark velvet] jacket that my sister had sent me, which was a Donna Karan second and it only had one shoulder pad. So while I was doing the song, I had to remember to lift my left shoulder slightly to even it out with the other". She also wore black leather trousers and black high-heeled boots.

The Eurovision performance of "Love Shine a Light" was simply staged with Leskanich singing center stage fronting background vocalists Beverley Skeete and Miriam Stockley: Skeete and Stockley, respectively dark-haired and blonde and clad in long dark dresses, also provided accompaniment with tambourines and handclaps. Two of Leskanich's co-members in Katrina and the Waves: drummer, Alex Cooper, and bassist, Vince de la Cruz (on this occasion playing guitar), were positioned towards the right side of the stage, while Phil Nicholl played bass stage left. Phil Nicholl was not a permanent member of Katrina and the Waves being a substitute for the group's regular guitarist – and the song's composer – Kimberley Rew, who Leskanich would later state had disassociated himself from the group's participating with his song in Eurovision. Don Airey, who played as a session musician on the single recording of the song, arranged and conducted the live version for Katrina & The Waves. He added strings, brass and a vibrato flute, giving the song a more anthemic feel.

=== Eurovision scoring ===
In a pre-performance interview on the night of the Eurovision finale Leskanich had stated that Katrina and the Waves winning Eurovision was "more than a dream – it's probably going to be a reality. I mean we wouldn't come here unless we were intending to win...For Eurovision [success] you need a song with a universal message, lighters in the air, Coca-Cola, heartwarming positive 'all-unite' [message]...[Our] song has a universality about it that unites everyone and I think people are looking for that message in Eurovision...they want something uplifting and positive, and I think once in a while a song comes along that says Eurovision and I think that's what 'Love Shine a Light' says and I'm just lucky that I'm the one that gets to sing it."

"Love Shine a Light" did indeed win Eurovision 1997 easily: with its first 12-point score being awarded by Austria the fourth reporting jury "Love Shine a Light" assumed permanent possession of first place on the scoreboard with its final vote tally an unprecedented 227 points besting the second-place entrant, the entrant for Ireland, "Mysterious Woman", by 70 points. The final vote tally for "Love Shine a Light" set a record unsurpassed until 2004, when the introduction of the semi-final greatly expanded the number of countries voting in the final (indeed, entire top three polled more than 227 points that year). It also received the maximum 12 points from ten countries, a feat not matched until 2005 and not beaten until 2009.

By a more directly comparable measure, "Love Shine a Light" received an average of 9.458 points per country or 78.82% of total votes available, the third-highest in the history of the present voting system, behind only "Save Your Kisses for Me" by Brotherhood of Man in 1976 (9.647 points per jury, 80.39% of available points) and "Ein bißchen Frieden" by Nicole in 1982 (9.470 votes per jury, 78.91% of available points). Furthermore, the song received maximum points from ten of twenty-four countries (41.7%), the fourth highest of all time behind "Euphoria" by Loreen in 2012 (which received 12 points from eighteen of forty-one countries, or 43.9%), "Non ho l'età" by Gigliola Cinquetti in 1964 (receiving the then-maximum 5 points from eight of fifteen countries, or 53.3%) and "Ein bißchen Frieden" in 1982 (12 points from nine of seventeen countries, or 52.9%).

Katrina Leskanich commented that it was the second landslide of the week – the Labour Party led by Tony Blair had won the UK general election held two days earlier, on 1 May 1997.

=== Aftermath ===
In a 2009 interview Leskanich restated her opinion of "Love Shine a Light": "It was such a feel-good, lighters-in-the-air, cheesy number.", while adding: "Our song was quickly forgotten because we didn't have any sensational gimmick like Bucks Fizz". Leskanich also stated that Katrina and the Waves Eurovision victory boosted the group's profile on the European cabaret circuit at the expense of their rock band credibility which heavily factored into the band's 1999 breakup.

On 22 October 2005, Leskanich co-hosted the Eurovision fiftieth anniversary competition Congratulations: 50 Years of the Eurovision Song Contest, held in Copenhagen, alongside Renārs Kaupers and sang her winning song in the opening sequence of the show with flag holders of all the nations who ever participated in Eurovision. The hosts of the Eurovision Song Contest 2006 –Sakis Rouvas and Maria Menounos– closed the opening act of its semi-final singing the song. A remix of the song was performed during the UK selection process final of 2008, Eurovision: Your Decision. In 2009, Leskanich performed it with the Dutch SuperVoices made up of 2000 Dutch choir singers. She also performed the song in UK's Eurovision selection process Eurovision: You Decide aired on BBC Four in 2016.

On 15 December 2019, Leskanich performed the song during Het Grote Songfestivalfeest, a Dutch live television concert programme starring artists of the Eurovision Song Contest as a prelude to the Eurovision Song Contest 2020 that had been scheduled to be held in Rotterdam, the Netherlands in May 2020. Following the 2020 contest's cancellation due to the COVID-19 pandemic, the contest organisers subsequently organised the replacement show Eurovision: Europe Shine a Light, whose title was inspired by the song. The song itself was performed during the show as an orchestral rendition by the Rotterdam Philharmonic Orchestra, and again near the end of the show by all the artists set to take part in the cancelled contest (with the exception of Hooverphonic from Belgium), with Leskanich finishing.

== Critical reception ==
British magazine Music Week rated "Love Shine a Light" three out of five, writing, "Though perfectly suited for Eurovision with its universal, everyone-come-together message, this anthemic-sounding song will require a decent competition performance to win over record buyers if it is to do anything chartwise."

== Track listings ==
- UK CD1
1. "Love Shine a Light" (radio version) – 2:52
2. "Love Shine a Light" (unplugged version) – 2:51
3. "Spiderman" – 3:12
- UK CD2 and Australian CD single
1. "Love Shine a Light" (radio version) – 2:51
2. "Spiderman" – 3:11
3. "Love Shine a Light" (Xenomania club mix) – 7:09
- UK cassette single
1. "Love Shine a Light" (radio version) – 2:52
2. "Spiderman" – 3:12
- European CD single
1. "Love Shine a Light" (radio version) – 2:52
2. "Love Shine a Light" (unplugged version) – 2:51

== Charts ==
=== Weekly charts ===
Chart (1997)	Peak position
Austria (Ö3 Austria Top 40)	2
Belgium (Ultratop 50 Flanders)	6
Belgium (Ultratop 50 Wallonia)	28
Europe (Eurochart Hot 100)	5
Finland (Suomen virallinen lista)	8
Germany (GfK)	62
Iceland (Íslenski Listinn Topp 40)	19
Ireland (IRMA)	5
Israel (Israeli Singles Chart)	1
Netherlands (Dutch Top 40)	4
Netherlands (Single Top 100)	6
Norway (VG-lista)	2
Scotland Singles (Official Charts)	3
Sweden (Sverigetopplistan)	5
Switzerland (Schweizer Hitparade)	26
UK Singles (Official Charts)	3

Chart (2020)	Peak position
Scotland Singles (Official Charts)	22

=== Year-end charts ===
Chart (1997)	Position
Austria (Ö3 Austria Top 40)	27
Belgium (Ultratop 50 Flanders)	40
Europe (Eurochart Hot 100)	64
Netherlands (Dutch Top 40)	40
Netherlands (Single Top 100)	65
Sweden (Topplistan)	53
UK Singles (OCC)	73

=== Certifications ===
Region	Certification	Certified units/sales
Norway (IFPI Norway)	Gold	
United Kingdom (BPI)	Silver	200,000^{‡}
^{‡} Sales+streaming figures based on certification alone.

== Legacy ==
- On the 1997 album Ett hus med många rum Kikki Danielssons orkester, featuring Kikki Danielsson on lead vocals, covered the song with lyrics in Swedish by Christer Lundh and Mikael Wendt, as Låt ett ljus få brinna (translated "Let a candle burn").
- Heidi Kyrö recorded the song in 1998, the Finnish version of the name "Päivänvaloon".
- Garry Hagger recorded the song as "Liefde brengt licht" for his 2014 album release 12 points which comprised Flemish renderings of Eurovision winners.
- The Irish singer Lee Matthews released it as a charity single on 23 May 2014 with proceeds going to the Irish charity Join Our Boys Trust, a charity for those suffering from Duchenne muscular dystrophy. The single charted at number 68 in the Irish Pop Charts.

Preceded by "The Voice" by Eimear Quinn	Eurovision Song Contest winners 1997	Succeeded by "Diva" by Dana International
