= Katrina and the Waves (album) =

Studio album by Katrina and the Waves
- Released: March 22, 1985
- Recorded: November 1984−January 1985
- Studios: Alaska Studios, London; The Greenhouse, London; Power Station, New York City
- Genres: Pop; new wave; power pop
- Length: 37:19
- Labels: Capitol; Attic (Canada)
- Producers: Pat Collier; Katrina and the Waves; Scott Litt

Katrina and the Waves chronology
Katrina and the Waves 2 (1984)	Katrina and the Waves (1985)	Waves (1986)

Singles from Katrina and the Waves
- 1. "Walking on Sunshine" Released: 15 April 1985; 2. "Red Wine and Whisky" Released: June 1985; 3. "Do You Want Crying" Released: July 1985; 4. "Que Te Quiero" Released: October 1985

Katrina and the Waves is the third studio album by American/English new wave band Katrina and the Waves, released in March 1985 by Capitol Records. It was their first album on a major label, and a Top 30 hit in the US and the UK. The majority of tracks were re-mixed and overdubbed versions of songs that had appeared on their first two albums; the tracks "Walking on Sunshine" and "Going Down to Liverpool" were entirely re-recorded versions of songs from their first independently released album.

This version of "Walking on Sunshine" became a top-ten pop hit in both the US and the UK.

== Background ==
Between 1983 and 1984, English-based Katrina and the Waves released their first two albums on the Canadian Attic label and enjoyed some airplay success in Canada as well as a chart position on the UK Singles Chart with "Que Te Quiero" (#84). Helped by intensive touring and the added mystique of their releases being on import in England and the United States, the band's reputation was growing. And when the Bangles covered "Going Down to Liverpool", a song from Katrina and the Waves' first album, major record labels started to take an interest. This eventually led to signing a deal with Capitol Records in Los Angeles.

It was decided to re-record, overdub or remix ten tracks from the two Canadian albums for their Capitol debut. The label wanted to make some of the songs more single-worthy, particularly "Going Down to Liverpool" and "Walking on Sunshine", so the band did some recording and mixing in London with producer Pat Collier, who had worked on their first two albums. "We did loads of versions [of "Walking on Sunshine"]," Collier said in 2017. "We just kept going round and round in circles. We kept redoing it nonstop." They also added a horn section, which the original 1983 version didn't have. Katrina Leskanich said in 2015, "As we were recording it, an arranger wandered in and said: "You should put horns on that." And he hummed what became that pumping melody. But the horn section we got in whinged so much about how hard it was to play that we had to drop the key just for them."

Ultimately, Capitol decided to outsource a remix, and the tracks were given to engineer Scott Litt at the Power Station in New York. The band arrived from London with Collier to meet with their new label and to be in New York while Litt mixed the album. Due to a problem with the drum tracks for "Walking on Sunshine", Litt had to re-record the drums at the Power Station. When drummer Alex Cooper had finished his work in a couple of takes, "it was phenomenal," Litt said in 2017. "All of a sudden the song exploded. As soon as the drums were done, that spurred us on to do more. I was flying guitars around." Talking with Goldmine magazine in 2021 about working with Litt on "Walking on Sunshine", Leskanich said, "Boy did he wave a magic wand over it, because it was his idea to start with the drums and said that the DJs will go crazy with that sound and it will wake up America. That was a stroke of genius. He was a great producer, getting the sound right." Litt also re-arranged parts in the song, like holding the horns out of the first chorus, and Leskanich's "Woo," which was somewhere else in the song, was put in after the drum intro. "Scott absolutely made that track," Collier said. "He took it in hand and made it what it is."

According to Leskanich, "Walking on Sunshine" was never meant to be the album's first single, as Capitol originally wanted to go with "Do You Want Crying". "Capitol sent out a sampler of four tracks and all the DJs said, "It's the "Sunshine" song because we can talk over the intro and it's got the right energy for summer," she said. When the song was released as a single in March 1985, it charted all over Europe, the US, Canada and Australia. By July 1985, Katrina and the Waves had sold more than 300,000 copies worldwide.

== Critical reception ==
Professional ratings
Review scores
Source	Rating
AllMusic	4.5/5 stars
Robert Christgau	A−
The Rolling Stone Album Guide	4/5 stars

In two contemporary reviews for Village Voice and Playboy, critic Robert Christgau wrote, "For a while I thought the only thing Capitol had done right was sign them, but between the exuberant Katrina Leskanich and the surefire Kimberley Rew this band would be hard for any label to fuck up: not one of the twenty songs on the band's two Attic LPs ... is a loser." Christgau felt that, as a songwriter, Rew has an "unerring knack for up-to-the-minute Sixties-style hooks" and writes "rock-outsider lyrics that never get obtrusively specific," while Leskanich has "a voice so big and enthusiastic she could make Barry Manilow's songs sound like Holland-Dozier-Holland." The "tricky" new version of "Machine Gun Smith" makes up for the "Motown horns" added to "Walking on Sunshine," Christgau said, and the re-recorded "hyped-up" drums on the latter "don't really hurt anything."

Commenting on the songs being re-recorded or remixed, Trouser Press wrote, "In most cases, it's an improvement, exposing untapped realms of both pop and power, but the second "Going Down to Liverpool" obliterates the atmosphere and the hooky melody of the original in an absurdly overheated arrangement. With that one caveat, Katrina and the Waves is otherwise a delight."

In a review for AllMusic, David Cleary wrote that re-recording ten songs from their first two albums made a lot of sense, given the "criminal" lack of attention the albums received. Recorded in what Cleary described as "an aggressive power pop style", most of the songs "hold up extremely well under this approach," he said. He singled out "Red Wine and Whisky" and "Do You Want Crying", describing them as "desperately driven and urgent tuneful rockers," while "Cry for Me" and "The Sun Won't Shine" "regenerate as blues-like shouting numbers of apocalyptic intensity." Cleary called the album "an essential purchase."

== Track listing ==
All tracks are written by Kimberley Rew, except where noted.

Side one
No.	Title	Writer(s)	Length
1.	"Red Wine and Whisky"		3:43
2.	"Do You Want Crying"	Vince de la Cruz	3:35
3.	"Que Te Quiero"		3:20
4.	"Machine Gun Smith"		3:03
5.	"Cry for Me"		4:58

Side two
No.	Title	Writer(s)	Length
6.	"Walking on Sunshine"		3:59
7.	"Going Down to Liverpool"		4:30
8.	"Mexico"	de la Cruz	3:17
9.	"The Sun Won't Shine Without You"		3:38
10.	"The Game of Love"		3:16
Total length:			37:19

== Personnel ==
Credits adapted from the album's liner notes.

Katrina and the Waves

- Katrina Leskanich – vocals, rhythm guitar, lead guitar (2, 4)
- Kimberley Rew – lead guitar, organ (8, 9), background vocals
- Vince de la Cruz – bass, rhythm guitar (1, 7, 10), background vocals
- Alex Cooper – drums, percussion, synthesizer (4), background vocals

Additional musicians

- Wendy Nicholl – background vocals (1, 5, 8, 9)
- Alan Chaney – organ (2)
- Nick Glennie-Smith – organ (5–7)
- John Earle – brass
- Dick Hanson – brass
- Ray Beavis – brass
- Eamon Fitzpatrick – brass arrangement (6)

Technical

- Katrina and the Waves – producer
- Pat Collier – producer, engineer
- Scott Litt – additional production, engineer, mixing
- Jon Goldberger – assistant engineer
- Bob Ludwig – mastering
- Pat Gorman/Manhattan Design – design
- Caroline Greyshock – photography

== Charts ==
Chart (1985)	Peak position
Australian Albums Chart	39
Canada RPM100 Albums	18
German Albums Chart	43
New Zealand Albums Chart	38
Swedish Albums Chart	6
UK Albums Chart	28
US Billboard 200	25

Singles - Billboard (United States)

Year	Single	Peak position			
Year	Single	Billboard Hot 100	Adult Contemporary	Hot Dance Music/Club Play	Mainstream Rock Tracks
1985	"Walking on Sunshine"	9	21	19	21
1985	"Do You Want Crying"	37	—	—	—
1985	"Que Te Quiero"	71	—	—	—
"—" denotes items that did not chart or were not released in that territory.

== Certifications ==
Region	Certification	Certified units/sales
Canada (Music Canada)	Platinum	100,000^{^}
Sweden (GLF)	Gold	50,000^{^}
^{^} Shipments figures based on certification alone.
