= Lesley Schiff =

American artist

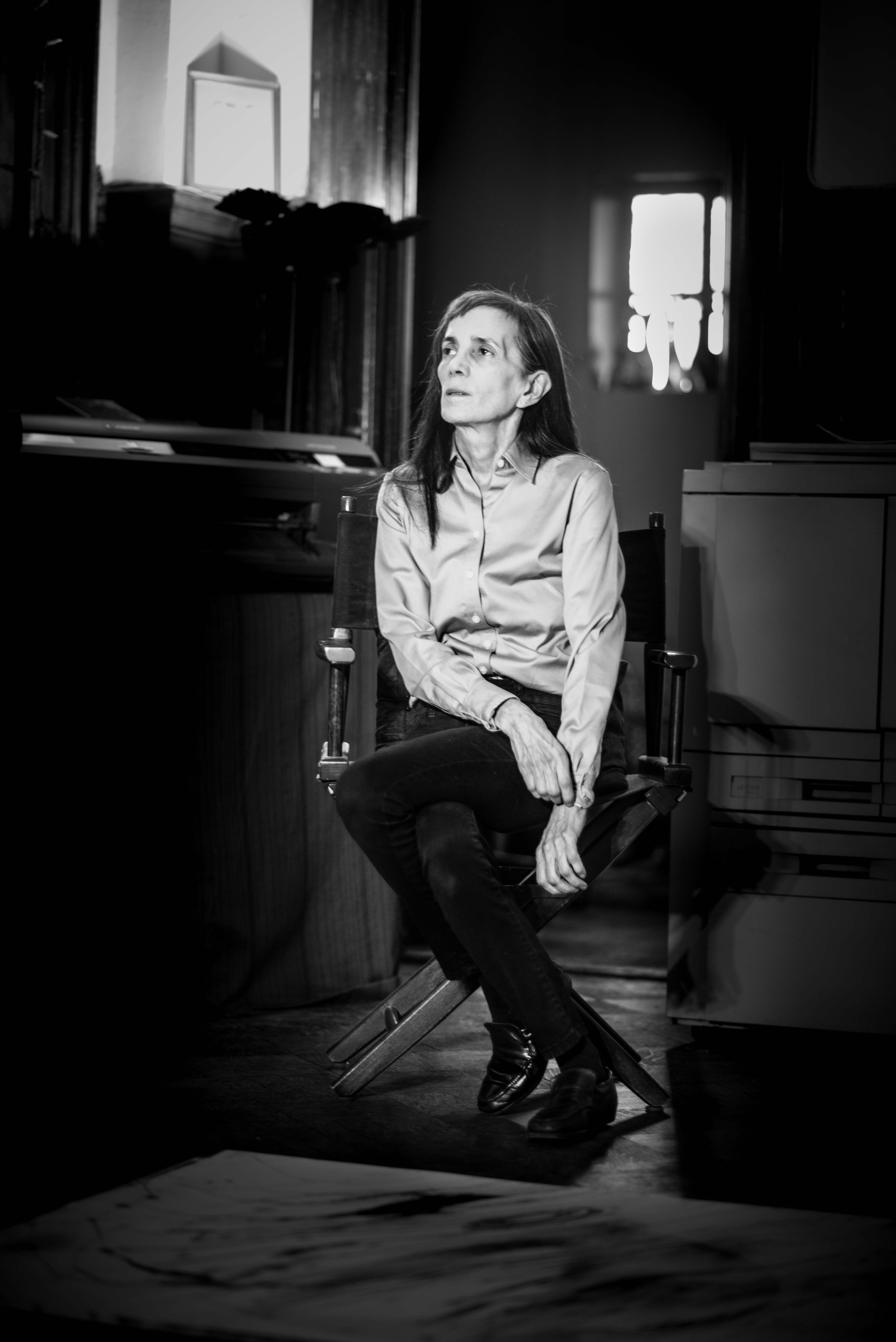
Lesley Schiff in 2018

Lesley Schiff (born January 27, 1951) is an American artist. She is known for her practice of using color laser printers to create images. Her art covers subjects from worldly affairs to nature and the mystical. Many of her works are included in the collections of The Metropolitan Museum of Art, The Whitney Museum of American Art, the Museum of Modern Art, and Buckingham Palace.

== Artistic career ==
Schiff majored in painting at The Art Institute of Chicago. After graduating in 1974 she moved to New York City. The next year she began using a Xerox 6500 color copier as a paintbrush and by 1981 she had completed her first collection of prints titled Seasons, which was acquired by The Metropolitan Museum of Art that same year.

After Seasons was obtained by the Metropolitan Museum of Art's permanent collection, the portfolio was acquired by Gianfranco Ferre, Manufacturers Hanover & Trust, Chase Manhattan Bank Collection, Goldman Sachs, The New York Public Library, and Security Pacific National Bank.

In 1990, Canon USA took notice of Schiff’s work and donated the Canon CLC 500, one of their newest color laser copiers to her studio. Unlike most other color copiers of the time, the Canon CLC 500 was able to use black ink, giving Schiff access to use darker tones in her art. Canon went on to fund her first exhibit using black: The Color of Light, and continues to sponsor her.

In 1992, Schiff was commissioned by International Papers, Hammermill brand to endorse the archival papers they produced for their laser photocopiers. They also sponsored her exhibition Angels & Money which delved into a wide range of documentary topics from government corruption to spirituality. To create these images, Schiff superimposed various banknotes over scenes from different countries.

In 1998, Angels and Money was exhibited at Galerie Mesmer and Arte Wallhoff in Basel, Switzerland, later being shown at galleries and museums around the United States in New York City, Atlanta, New Orleans, and Philadelphia.

In 1993, Columbia Records commissioned 104 portraits of their recording artists for a permanent installation on 3 floors of their executive offices. This project took her until 1995 to complete.

While on commission, Schiff was introduced to Bob Dylan’s manager in 1997, which finally resulted in a contract in 2005 for a limited edition portrait of Dylan. This portrait consisted of 45 images: 15 divergent images of Dylan, 15 icons that reflected his enigmatic persona and 15 illustrated songs using a font designed exclusively by Matthew Carter for the lyrics.

In 2015, Schiff’s “LIT: A Portrait of Bob Dylan” was displayed at a pop-up museum in Fenway, Boston.

=== Collections ===
Schiff's art is in individual, corporate and museum collections around the world including those of:

- The Metropolitan Museum of Art - New York City, NY
- Mick Jagger
- The Whitney Museum of Art - New York City, NY
- Buckingham Palace - Westminster, UK
- The Mead Art Museum - Amherst, MA
- Columbia Records
- Canon USA
- JP Morgan - New York City
- The New York Public Library - New York City, NY
- Yale University Art Gallery - New Haven, CT
- Gianfranco Ferre
