= Katrina and the Waves =

English-American rock band (1981–1999)

- Clockwise from top left: Alex Cooper, Vince de la Cruz, Kimberley Rew, and Katrina Leskanich; 1985

Background information
- Origin: Cambridge, Cambridgeshire, England
- Genres: Rock; new wave
- Years active: 1981–1999
- Labels: Attic; Capitol; SBK; EMI; Virgin; Polydor; Warner
- Past members: Katrina Leskanich; Kimberley Rew; Vince de la Cruz; Alex Cooper; Bob Jakins
- Website: katrinaandthewaves.com

Katrina and the Waves was an English rock band formed in Cambridge in 1981, widely known for their 1985 hit "Walking on Sunshine". They won the Eurovision Song Contest 1997 with the song "Love Shine a Light".

== History ==
=== Pre-history (1975–1980) ===
The band's earliest incarnation was as the Waves, a group that played in and around Cambridge, from 1975 to 1977. The Waves featured guitarist Kimberley Rew and drummer Alex Cooper. This incarnation of the Waves did not issue any recordings, and broke up when Rew left to join The Soft Boys.

A more direct ancestor of Katrina and the Waves was the band Mama's Cookin', a pop cover band from Feltwell. This band, founded in 1978, featured American Katrina Leskanich on vocals and keyboards, and fellow American, Vince de la Cruz on vocals and lead guitar. During a school production at RAF Lakenheath, Vince had noticed Katrina, and asked her to join his band.

By late 1980, Alex Cooper had joined the band on drums, with Bob Jakins on bass. Mama's Cookin' proceeded to gig steadily in England over the next two years, specialising in covers of songs by American acts such as Heart, Foreigner, Linda Ronstadt and ZZ Top.

=== Early days as The Waves (1981–1982) ===
When The Soft Boys broke up in 1981, Rew contacted his old Wave-mate Cooper to see about renewing their musical partnership. Cooper convinced Rew to join Mama's Cookin', and the five-piece group (Leskanich/Rew/Cooper/de la Cruz/Jakins) was quickly renamed the Waves after the band Rew and Cooper had been in together in the mid-1970s.

The Waves were initially fronted by singer/songwriter/guitarist Rew, who brought a wealth of original material to the band. Leskanich, meanwhile, originally only sang lead vocals on the cover tunes in the band's repertoire. However, over the first year of the Waves' existence, Rew began to write material for Leskanich to sing, and she was soon the primary vocalist.

The Waves made their initial recorded appearances on a 1982 single ("The Nightmare"/"Hey, War Pig!"); both tracks were included on the 1982 Rew solo album called The Bible of Bop. The Waves then issued their debut EP Shock Horror! later in 1982; Rew and Leskanich both sang lead, about 50/50. Around this time, bassist Jakins left the band, and de la Cruz took over on bass. Now a quartet, the Waves issued the single "Brown Eyed Son" in the UK in August 1982 before permanently renaming themselves Katrina and the Waves.

=== Early Canadian success (1983–1984) ===
In early 1983, the fledgling band recorded, at their own expense, an album of their original material designed to be sold at gigs. Rew wrote all the songs on this album, and Leskanich sang eight of the album's 10 tracks. (Rew sang lead on the other two.)

The album was shopped around to various labels, but only Attic Records in Canada responded with an offer. Consequently, although they were based in England, Katrina and the Waves' first album Walking on Sunshine was released only in Canada.

The album garnered enough critical attention and radio play (especially for the title track) to merit a Canadian tour. In 1984, the group released a follow-up album in Canada (Katrina and the Waves 2), with Leskanich now handling all the lead vocals. Rew was still the primary songwriter, but de la Cruz was also responsible for a few songs, including the Canadian airplay hit "Mexico".

Also in 1984, the band received their first ever airplay on BBC Radio 1 when DJ Richard Skinner played the track "Que te quiero", whilst their song "Going Down to Liverpool" was covered by the Bangles, which added to their profile. With the group building a fan base with their recordings and extensive touring, major label interest began to build, and Katrina and the Waves eventually signed an international deal with Capitol Records in 1985.

=== "Walking on Sunshine" and international success (1985–1989) ===
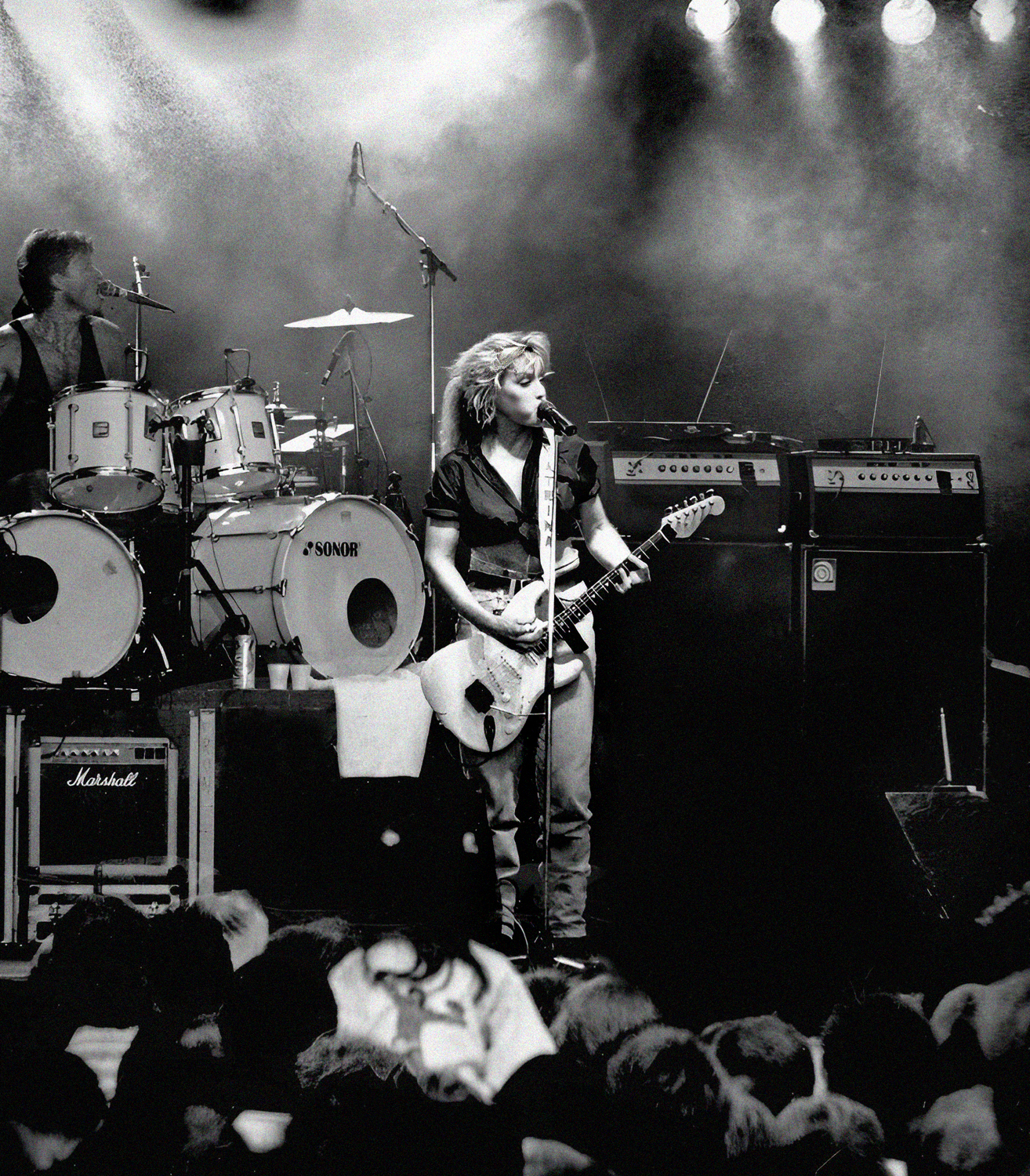
Katrina and the Waves performing live in Malmö, 14 August 1988

For the first Capitol album, the band re-recorded, remixed, or overdubbed 10 songs from their earlier Canadian releases to create their self-titled international debut album in 1985.

The Katrina and the Waves album was a substantial critical and commercial success, and the group had a worldwide hit with the song "Walking on Sunshine," (no. 9 US, no. 8 UK, a completely re-recorded, and substantially rearranged version of the song when compared to its initial 1983 Canada-only release). A Grammy Award nomination for Best New Artist followed, as did constant touring, both of which helped to spur moderate sales of new releases.

A follow-up single to "Walking on Sunshine" called "Do You Want Crying" (written by de la Cruz) also became a top 40 US hit, reaching no. 37 in the late summer of 1985.

However, the band's follow-up album to Katrina and the Waves (simply entitled Waves) did not meet with the same measure of success, either critically or commercially. Rew wrote only two of the 10 songs on the album; de la Cruz and Leskanich wrote the rest. Drummer Cooper, interviewed some years later, claimed "It was (a) mistake when we started taking over from Kimberley in the musical contribution side. The second Capitol album was awful".

The album did spin off a minor UK and US hit in the form of the Rew-penned "Is That It?" (no. 70 US, no. 82 UK), and "Sun Street" (a de la Cruz composition) was a UK top 30 hit in 1986. However, Capitol dropped the band after the Waves album.

The band subsequently recorded a 1989 album for Capitol-distributed SBK Records called Break of Hearts, a harder, more rock-oriented effort than their previous releases. The album included "That's the Way" which reached no. 16 in the US (credited to Leskanich/Rew), but subsequent singles, including "Rock 'n' Roll Girl", failed to chart, and the band once again were dropped from their label.

=== Downturn and surprise comeback winning Eurovision (1990–1997) ===
Throughout the 1990s, Katrina and the Waves recorded fairly steadily, though most releases were available only in continental Europe and/or Canada, and they issued no charting singles. They also recorded the song "We Gotta Get Out of This Place" with Eric Burdon for the TV series China Beach in 1990.

On 3 May 1997, the band won the Eurovision Song Contest 1997 for the United Kingdom with the song "Love Shine a Light". The song was written years earlier to celebrate an anniversary of a local branch of Samaritans; one of the members of the charity organization suggested the song be submitted. Although the band had nearly forgotten about the song, never releasing it on an album because it "felt too Eurovision-y", the band eventually submitted it last-minute. The song won the contest by a then-record margin of 70 points over the Irish runner-up. "Love Shine a Light" became Katrina and the Waves' biggest-ever UK hit, peaking at no. 3 in the UK Singles Chart.

In a 2020 interview, Katrina Leskanich revealed that, as an American national winning the Eurovision Song Contest for the UK, she was the target of criticism, with some people arguing that UK should have instead sent an English singer to the contest; she also claimed she was asked if she could "try and talk like an English person". Leskanich had moved to the UK in 1976, at the age of 16, and had lived in the UK for more than two decades by the time of her Eurovision appearance.

=== Dissolution (1998–1999) ===
Despite their return to the public eye in the UK, Katrina and the Waves were not able to follow up "Love Shine a Light" with another hit, and Leskanich left the group in 1998 after several disagreements within the band. Legal wrangling followed, preventing Leskanich from using the band name. Though attempts were made by the Waves to find a new "Katrina" to front the group, the three remaining group members eventually dissolved the band to pursue individual careers in 1999.

=== Impact of Hurricane "Katrina" (2005) ===
When Hurricane Katrina and its storm surge devastated much of the U.S. Gulf Coast on 29 August 2005, the MSNBC news program Countdown with Keith Olbermann dubbed its coverage of the storm "Katrina and the Waves"; the name also appeared in numerous headlines and blog postings. A New York Times reporter contacted Katrina Leskanich, who said: "The first time I opened the paper and saw 'Katrina kills 9,' it was a bit of a shock...I hope that the true spirit of 'Walking on Sunshine' will prevail. I would hate for the title to be tinged with sadness, and I will have to do my own part to help turn that around." She also stated that she hoped that "Walking on Sunshine" would become an anthem for the Gulf Coast's recovery.

=== Later years (2010–2013) ===
2010 marked the 25th anniversary of the release of "Walking on Sunshine" and a series of back-catalogue reissues and a re-recorded version of the track were released. A free download of one of the tracks from Kimberley Rew's solo album The Bible of Bop was given away in March 2010 from the band's website. Katrina Leskanich released The Live Album in July 2010 – a mix of Katrina and the Waves hits and new songs recorded in London and Germany.

In June 2011, the group threatened legal action against U.S. presidential candidate Michele Bachmann for playing their music on her campaign trail. A statement on the group's official website reads: "Katrina and the Waves would like it to be known that they do not endorse the use of "Walking on Sunshine" by Michele Bachmann and have instructed their lawyers accordingly." Leskanich stated that she wants to ban the Republican party from using the track because she does not agree with their politics.

In July 2013, Leskanich performed at the San Fermín festival in Spain for the penultimate gig of the season on Plaza del Castillo.

== Members ==
Final lineup

- Katrina Leskanich – vocals, rhythm guitar
- Kimberley Rew – vocals, lead guitar
- Vince de la Cruz – bass guitar
- Alex Cooper – drums

Other members

- Bob Jakins – bass guitar

== Discography ==
=== Studio albums ===
List of studio albums, with selected chart positions and certifications
Title	Album details	Peak chart positions											Certifications
Title	Album details	UK	AUS	AUT	CAN	FIN	GER	NED	NZ	NOR	SWE	US	Certifications
Shock Horror! (as The Waves)	Released: 1983; Label: Aftermath	—	—	—	—	—	—	—	—	—	—	—	
Walking on Sunshine	Released: 1983; Label: Attic	—	—	—	—	—	—	—	—	—	—	—	
Katrina and the Waves 2	Released: 1984; Label: Attic	—	—	—	—	—	—	—	—	—	—	—	
Katrina and the Waves	Released: 1985; Label: Capitol	28	39	—	18	—	46	—	38	—	6	25	CAN: Platinum
Waves	Released: 1986; Label: Capitol	70	92	—	35	17	—	—	—	12	3	49	CAN: Gold
Break of Hearts	Released: 1989; Label: SBK	—	127	—	63	—	—	—	—	—	6	122	
Pet the Tiger	Released: 1991; Label: Virgin	—	—	—	—	—	—	—	—	—	48	—	
Edge of the Land	Released: 1993; Label: Polydor	—	—	—	—	—	—	—	—	—	—	—	
Turnaround	Released: 1994; Label: Polydor	—	—	—	—	—	—	—	—	—	—	—	
Walk on Water	Released: 1997; Label: Warner	—	—	47	—	—	—	38	—	—	—	—	
"—" denotes a recording that did not chart or was not released in that territory.

=== Compilation albums ===
- The Best of (1991, Attic)
- Roses (1995, Polydor) (Canadian release only – compiles tracks from Edge of the Land and Turn Around)
- Anthology (1995, One Way Records / CEMA Special Markets)
- Katrina and the Waves / Waves (1996, BGO)
- Walking on Sunshine – The Greatest Hits of Katrina and the Waves (1997, EMI)
- The Original Recordings 1983 – 1984 (2003, Bongo Beat) (includes Walking on Sunshine, Katrina and the Waves 2, and bonus tracks)

=== Singles ===
List of singles, with selected chart positions and certifications, showing year released and album name
Title	Year	Peak chart positions												Certifications	Album
Title	Year	UK	AUS	AUT	CAN	FIN	GER	IRE	NED	NZ	NOR	SWE	US	Certifications	Album
"The Nightmare" (as The Waves)	1982	—	—	—	—	—	—	—	—	—	—	—	—		Non-album single
"Brown Eyed Son" (as The Waves)	1982	—	—	—	—	—	—	—	—	—	—	—	—		Shock Horror!
"Walking on Sunshine" (Attic version)	1983	—	—	—	—	—	—	—	—	—	—	—	—		Walking on Sunshine
"Que Te Quiero" (Attic version)	1983	84	—	—	—	—	—	—	—	—	—	—	—		Walking on Sunshine
"Plastic Man"	1984	—	—	—	—	—	—	—	—	—	—	—	—		Non-album single
"Mexico" (Attic version)	1984	—	—	—	—	—	—	—	—	—	—	—	—		Katrina and the Waves 2
"Walking on Sunshine" (Capitol version)	1985	8	4	—	3	25	28	2	—	20	—	12	9	UK: Silver; CAN: Gold	Katrina and the Waves
"Red Wine and Whiskey" (Capitol version)	1985	—	—	—	—	—	41	—	—	—	—	—	—		Katrina and the Waves
"Do You Want Crying?" (Capitol version)	1985	96	38	—	29	—	—	—	—	—	—	—	37		Katrina and the Waves
"Que Te Quiero" (Capitol version)	1985	—	—	—	—	—	—	—	—	—	—	—	71		Katrina and the Waves
"Mexico" (Capitol version; Spain only promo)	1985	—	—	—	—	—	—	—	—	—	—	—	—		Katrina and the Waves
"Is That It?"	1986	82	82	—	25	—	—	—	—	—	—	—	70		Waves
"Sun Street"	1986	22	—	—	—	—	—	19	46	—	—	—	—		Waves
"Tears for Me"	1986	—	—	—	—	—	—	—	—	—	—	—	—		Waves
"Lovely Lindsey"	1986	—	—	—	—	—	—	—	—	—	—	—	—		Waves
"That's the Way"	1989	84	58	—	16	—	—	—	—	50	—	—	16		Break of Hearts
"Rock 'n Roll Girl"	1989	93	146	—	—	—	—	—	—	—	—	—	—		Break of Hearts
"We Gotta Get Out of This Place" (featuring Eric Burdon)	1990	—	89	—	—	—	—	—	—	—	—	—	—		China Beach: Music and Memories
"Brown Eyed Son" (re-release)	1991	—	—	—	—	—	—	—	—	—	—	—	—		Non-album single
"Pet the Tiger"	1991	—	—	—	—	—	—	—	—	—	—	—	—		Pet the Tiger
"Tears of a Woman"	1991	—	—	—	—	—	—	—	—	—	—	—	—		Pet the Tiger
"Birkenhead Garbage Pickers	1992	—	—	—	—	—	—	—	—	—	—	—	—		Pet the Tiger
"Honey Lamb"	1993	—	—	—	—	—	59	—	—	—	—	—	—		Edge of the Land
"I'm in Deep"	1993	—	—	—	—	—	—	—	—	—	—	—	—		Edge of the Land
"Angel Eyes"	1993	—	—	—	—	—	—	—	—	—	—	—	—		Edge of the Land
"Cookin'"	1994	—	—	—	—	—	—	—	—	—	—	—	—		Edge of the Land
"The Street Where You Live"	1995	—	—	—	—	—	—	—	—	—	—	—	—		Turn Around
"Walking Where the Roses Grow"	1995	—	—	—	—	—	—	—	—	—	—	—	—		Turn Around
"Turn Around"	1995	—	—	—	—	—	—	—	—	—	—	—	—		Turn Around
"Walking on Sunshine" (re-release)	1996	53	—	—	—	—	—	—	—	—	—	—	—		Walking on Sunshine – The Greatest Hits of Katrina and the Waves
"Love Shine a Light"	1997	3	—	2	—	—	62	5	6	—	2	5	—		Walk on Water
"Walk on Water"	1997	—	—	—	—	—	—	—	94	—	—	—	—		Walk on Water
"Brown Eyed Son" (re-release)	1997	—	—	—	—	—	—	—	—	—	—	—	—		Non-album single
"—" denotes a single that did not chart or was not released in that territory.

Note

- The Capitol versions of "Que Te Quiero" and "Red Wine and Whiskey" were released as a double A-side in the UK following "Walking on Sunshine" and "Do You Want Crying?".

Awards and achievements
Preceded by (Republic of Ireland) Eimear Quinn with "The Voice"	Winner of the Eurovision Song Contest; 1997	Succeeded by (Israel) Dana International with "Diva"
Preceded by Gina G with "Ooh Aah... Just a Little Bit"	United Kingdom in the Eurovision Song Contest; 1997	Succeeded by Imaani with "Where Are You?"
