= The Bible of Bop =

EP by Kimberley Rew
- Released: 1982
- Recorded: 1980–1981
- Studios: Alaska Studios (London); Spaceward Studios (Cambridge)
- Genres: Pop rock; power pop
- Length: 20:46
- Labels: Compendium, Inc.
- Producers: Mike Kemp; Pat Collier; Gene Holder

Kimberley Rew chronology
The Bible of Bop (1982)	Tunnel into Summer (2000)

The Bible of Bop is a mini-album and the first solo release by English guitarist and songwriter Kimberley Rew, released in 1982. It mostly consists of tracks taken from three singles Rew released through indie label Armageddon between 1980 and 1982: two under his own name, backed by members of the dB's and the Soft Boys; and one as part of the Waves (soon to change their name to Katrina and the Waves). In 2010, the album was reissued on CD for the first time on the CGB label with three bonus tracks.

== Background ==
In 1980, while still a member of the Soft Boys, Kimberley Rew recorded the solo single "Stomping All Over the World" for Armageddon Records, to which the band was signed. Three songs were recorded with the Soft Boys for the single as a side project for Rew. "Can't remember if it was my idea or the record company's," Rew wrote in the 2010 reissue liner notes. By March 1981, the Soft Boys had disbanded, and Rew "inherited" their recording contract with Armageddon. Rew had met Peter Holsapple from American band the dB's during a visit to New York with the Soft Boys the previous year. According to Rew, the dB's were "one of the few to connect with the Soft Boys style", so for his second solo single for the label, Armageddon suggested that Rew record with the dB's, who were on a UK tour at the time. "And they were willing to spend a day with me in the studio on a friendly basis," Rew said. With regular bassist Gene Holder producing the session, crew member Mitch Easter stood in on bass. Three tracks were recorded for the single "My Baby Does Her Hairdo Long", which, like its predecessor, "disappeared" despite a positive write-up in Sounds magazine's "Singles of the Week" in May 1981.

The third and last session providing material for The Bible of Bop was recorded in 1981 with a band Rew had joined the same year. Originally called Mama's Cookin', the band included drummer Alex Cooper, with whom Rew had played in the pre-Soft Boys band the Waves. Mama's Cookin' was soon renamed the Waves, and two tracks from their session were released as the 1982 Armageddon single "The Nightmare". All three singles, their five B-sides, and one dB's session outtake were gathered by Armageddon into a 45 rpm mini-album under Rew's name and released in 1982 on the Compendium, Inc. imprint.

== Critical reception ==
Professional ratings
Review scores
Source	Rating
AllMusic	3.5/5 stars
Trouser Press	positive

In a contemporary review in Sounds magazine's "Singles of the Week", Mick Wall called the "My Baby Does Her Hairdo Long" single as a "pleasure-parlour", writing that the A-side "kicks harder, is bouncier and funnier than the Knack in their prime." The B-side, "Fishing", was described as "pure Bobby Vee schmaltz right down to the crashing waves of acoustic guitars and touchy sentimental chorus." Another contemporary review in the New York Rocker described the "Stomping All Over the World" single and its two B-sides (Nothing's Going to Change and Fighting Someone's War) as "a very mixed bag of tunes", but "highly recommended." New York Rocker wrote that the two B-sides move from "early Rundgren guitar pop to a Graham Nash (vocally)/Only Ones (musically) rocker without batting an eye," while "Stomping All Over the World" was a "Slade/T. Rex slice of fun."

Retrospective reviews were also positive. AllMusic's Mark Deming noted that the three tracks featuring the Soft Boys have a noticeably different feel from their last album Underwater Moonlight, but that the band "sounds every bit as bracing as it did on that album, and as always the guitar interplay between Rew and [Robyn] Hitchcock is splendid." Deming also felt that the three tracks are "clever and engaging pop tunes." For the three tracks recorded with the dB's, Deming wrote that "the energetic Dixie-fried pop style of the dB's is very much audible ... but they make a good match for Rew's talents in the studio and bring a welcome spark to the material." The two tracks with the Waves, Deming commented, "didn't offer much of a clue as to what the Waves would be doing a few years down the line, but it's clear they were a solid and sympathetic backing band that worked well with Rew and rocked with style and enthusiasm." Deming wrote that Rew has often stood in the shadow of his lead singers (Hitchcock and Katrina Leskanich), and that The Bible of Bop reveals he's always had "the talent and the charisma to be up front."

Trouser Press wrote that Rew survived the end of the Soft Boys "to take further forays into melodious '60s folk rock and psychedelia." Though Rew doesn't "pursue weirdness as avidly" as Soft Boys songwriter Robyn Hitchcock, Trouser Press felt that he has "a neat winner" with The Bible of Bop. Richard Foster from the Louder Than War website called it an "utterly classic record".

== Track listing ==
All songs written by Kimberley Rew, except where noted.

No.	Title	Writer(s)	Length
1.	"Nightmare"		2:19
2.	"Stomping All Over the World"		2:19
3.	"Nothing's Going to Change"		2:30
4.	"Fighting Someone's War"		4:04
5.	"My Baby Does Her Hairdo Long"		2:47
6.	"Walking in the Dew"	Traditional	1:54
7.	"Fishing"		2:12
8.	"Hey, War Pig!"		2:41
Total length:			20:46

2010 reissue bonus tracks
No.	Title	Length
9.	"Give Me Some of That Love" (Previously unreleased)	2:37
10.	"I'm Amazed" (Previously unreleased)	1:57
11.	"Animal Song" (Previously unreleased)	2:32
Total length:		27:52

== Personnel ==
Credits are adapted from the CD reissue liner notes.

- Kimberley Rew – vocals, guitar, piano

The Waves (tracks 1, 8–11)

- Katrina Leskanich – vocals
- Vince de la Cruz – guitar (1, 8–10), bass (11)
- Bob Jakins – bass (1, 8–10)
- Alex Cooper – drums

The Soft Boys (tracks 2–4)

- Robyn Hitchcock – guitar
- Matthew Seligman – bass
- Morris Windsor – drums, backing vocals

The dB's (tracks 5–7)

- Peter Holsapple – guitar, backing vocals
- Mitch Easter – bass, backing vocals
- Will Rigby – drums, backing vocals

Technical

- Mike Kemp – producer, engineer (1, 8)
- Pat Collier – producer, engineer (2–4, 9–11)
- Gene Holder – producer (5–7)
- Peter Wooliscroft – engineer (5–7)
- Rieuwert Buitenga – pre-mastering, restoration (2010 reissue)
- Randy Merrill – mastering (2010 reissue)

== Recording notes ==
- Tracks 1 and 8 recorded at Spaceward Studios, Cambridge, 1981. Originally released on "The Nightmare" single in 1982, credited to the Waves.
- Tracks 2-4 recorded at Alaska Studios, London, 1980. Originally released on the Kimberley Rew solo single "Stomping All Over the World" in 1980.
- Tracks 5-7 recorded at Advision Studios, London, 1981. 5 and 7 originally released on the Kimberley Rew solo single "My Baby Does Her Hairdo Long" in 1981. 6 is a session outtake.
- Tracks 9 and 10 recorded at Alaska Studios, London, June 1981. Previously unreleased.
- Track 11 recorded at Alaska Studios, London, 1982. Previously unreleased.
