= Walking on Sunshine (Katrina and the Waves song) =

1985 single by Katrina and the Waves

Single by Katrina and the Waves

from the album Walking on Sunshine
- B-side: "Going Down to Liverpool"
- Released: 15 April 1985
- Recorded: 1983
- Studio: Alaska Studios, London
- Genre: New wave; pop rock; bubblegum
- Length: 3:15 (original version); 3:59 (re-recorded version); 3:47 (video version)
- Label: Attic
- Songwriter: Kimberley Rew
- Producers: Katrina and the Waves; Pat Collier

Katrina and the Waves singles chronology
"Plastic Man" (1984)	"Walking on Sunshine" (1985)	"Do You Want Crying" (1985)

Music video
- "Walking on Sunshine" on YouTube

"Walking on Sunshine" is a song written by Kimberley Rew for the English rock band Katrina and the Waves' 1983 album Walking on Sunshine. A rerecorded version was included on the band's 1985 album Katrina and the Waves and was released as its second single in April 1985. The song reached No. 4 in Australia, No. 9 in the United States and No. 8 in the United Kingdom. It was the Waves' first American top-40 hit and their biggest success in the UK until "Love Shine a Light" (1997), which won them the Eurovision Song Contest 1997 held in Dublin.

== Background ==
"Walking on Sunshine" was written by the band's guitarist Kimberley Rew. "I'd love to say Walking on Sunshine relates to a significant event in my life, like walking out of my front door, seeing a comet and being inspired," he told The Guardian in 2015. "But it's just a piece of simple fun, an optimistic song, despite us not being outstandingly cheery people. We were a typical young band, insecure and pessimistic. We didn't have big hair and didn't look anything like a Motown-influenced group. We didn't have any credibility or a fanbase in awe of our mystique. We were a second-on-the-bill-at-a-festival-in-Germany pop band. But we had this song."

The rest of the band did not like the song at first. Lead singer Katrina Leskanich thought "it wasn't really us", while bassist Vince de la Cruz found it irritating.

The sheet music for "Walking on Sunshine" is in the key of B♭ major in standard time with a tempo indication of "bright rock".

== Success ==
Katrina and the Waves kept the song's publishing rights, and the royalties that are typically to the songwriter have been divided among the band members. The royalties from airplay and advertisements have been very lucrative; according to a former employee of EMI, the song was "the crown jewel in EMI's catalog", and it ranked among EMI's highest earners from advertisements.

When Hurricane Katrina devastated much of the U.S. Gulf Coast in 2005, the MSNBC program Countdown with Keith Olbermann dubbed its coverage of the storm "Katrina and the Waves". The name also appeared in numerous headlines and blog postings. A New York Times reporter contacted Katrina Leskanich, who said: "The first time I opened the paper and saw 'Katrina kills 9,' it was a bit of a shock. ... I hope that the true spirit of 'Walking on Sunshine' will prevail. I would hate for the title to be tinged with sadness, and I will have to do my own part to help turn that around." She also expressed her hope that "Walking on Sunshine" would become an anthem for the Gulf Coast's recovery.

In 2010, the 25th anniversary of the release of "Walking on Sunshine", the band's material was re-released and a re-recorded version of the track was produced. A free download of a track from Kimberley Rew's solo album Bible of Bop was made available in March 2010 at the band's website.

In August 2015, the song was acquired by BMG Rights Management for £10 million, along with all of the other songs written by Rew and Katrina and the Waves.

In a 2020 interview, Leskanich said that she believes that the song is going to outlive her.

== Personnel ==
Personnel for both recordings are the same except where noted.

Katrina and the Waves

- Katrina Leskanich – vocals, rhythm guitar
- Kimberley Rew – lead guitar
- Vince de la Cruz – bass
- Alex Cooper – drums

Additional musicians

- Nick Glennie-Smith – organ (Note: Producer and engineer Pat Collier believes that a sampling keyboard (likely an E-mu Emulator) sounding like a Hammond organ was used instead of a real organ.)
- Kevin Flanagan – saxophone (1983 version)
- John "Irish" Earle – brass (1985 version)
- Dick Hanson – brass (1985 version)
- Ray Beavis – brass (1985 version)
- Eamon Fitzpatrick – brass arrangement (1985 version)

== Charts ==
=== Weekly charts ===
1985 weekly chart performance for "Walking on Sunshine"
Chart (1985)	Peak position
Australia (Kent Music Report)	4
Canada Top Singles (RPM)	3
Canada Adult Contemporary (RPM)	3
Europe (European Hot 100 Singles)	13
Finland (Suomen virallinen lista)	25
Ireland (IRMA)	2
New Zealand (Recorded Music NZ)	20
Sweden (Sverigetopplistan)	12
Switzerland (Schweizer Hitparade)	14
UK Singles (Official Charts)	8
US Billboard Hot 100	9
US Adult Contemporary (Billboard)	21
US Dance Club Play (Billboard)	19
US Top Rock Tracks (Billboard)	21
US Cash Box Top 100	9
West Germany (GfK)	28

1996 weekly chart performance for "Walking on Sunshine"
Chart (1996)	Peak position
UK Singles (Official Charts)	53

2017 weekly chart performance for "Walking on Sunshine"
Chart (2017)	Peak position
Poland Airplay (ZPAV)	84

2026 weekly chart performance for "Walking on Sunshine"
Chart (2026)	Peak position
Netherlands Airplay (Dutch Charts)	33

=== Year-end charts ===
Year-end chart performance for "Walking on Sunshine"
Chart (1985)	Position
Australia (Kent Music Report)	21
Canada Top Singles (RPM)	18
US Billboard Hot 100	75
US Cash Box	80

== Certifications ==
Certifications for "Walking on Sunshine"
Region	Certification	Certified units/sales
Canada (Music Canada)	Gold	10,000^{*}
Denmark (IFPI Danmark)	Platinum	90,000^{‡}
Italy (FIMI)	Platinum	100,000^{‡}
Portugal (AFP)	Gold	20,000^{‡}
United Kingdom (BPI)	2× Platinum	1,200,000^{‡}
Summaries
Worldwide	—	2,000,000
^{*} Sales figures based on certification alone.^{‡} Sales+streaming figures based on certification alone.

== In popular culture ==
An instrumental version was used as a theme song for the short-lived, weekly hour-long Australian game show called The Main Event hosted by Larry Emdur; it aired on the Seven Network from 7 April 1991 until 22 November 1992. This was an arranged version by series music composer Jamie Rigg where it featured female vocalists repeating the title of the show as its only lyric.

The song is very popular in commercials, and advertisers typically pay $150,000 to $200,000 per year to use the song. This song appeared in a mashup with Beyoncé's "Halo" in the popular television show Glee, featured in the Season 1 episode "Vitamin D". It was performed by the female members of the glee club New Directions, with featured solos by Rachel Berry (Lea Michele) and Mercedes Jones (Amber Riley). It was released as a single on October 7, 2009, through digital download on iTunes, and debuted on the Billboard Hot 100 at number 40 while reaching number 4 in Ireland, number 9 in the UK and number 10 in Australia.

The song has been featured in many movies, such as High Fidelity, American Psycho, Daddy Day Care, Herbie: Fully Loaded, The Secret of My Success, Bean, The Master of Disguise, Look Who's Talking, Ella Enchanted, Ramona and Beezus, and more. It has also been featured in many TV series such as Sports Night, It's Always Sunny in Philadelphia, Prison Break, The Big Bang Theory, Cougar Town, Young Sheldon, The Goldbergs, and Landman. In Futurama, character Philip J Fry sang (off key) excerpts from the song in several episodes, indicating that it was one of his favorites.

The song was covered by metalcore band Ice Nine Kills and ska band Reel Big Fish for the soundtrack to the comic book adaptation of American Psycho.

The song was used in the opening cutscene and credits of the 2013 video game Lego City Undercover.

Covers of the song have been featured in two installments of Ubisoft's Just Dance rhythm videogame franchise, namely Just Dance 2023 Edition, Just Dance Kids 2014, and in one of its spinoffs, The Smurfs Dance Party.

Since the 2025 MLB season, the Tampa Bay Rays have played the song in the home games they won.

The song is also one of five songs covered on Rock n' Roller Coaster starring the Muppets, performed by guest star Kelly Clarkson.
