= Going Down to Liverpool =

1983 song by the Waves

Song by the Waves

from the EP Shock Horror!
- Released: 1983
- Length: 3:33
- Label: Aftermath
- Songwriter: Kimberley Rew
- Producer: Richard Bishop

Licensed audio
- "Going Down to Liverpool" on YouTube

"Going Down to Liverpool" is a song written by Kimberley Rew for his group Katrina and the Waves, and best remembered as a cover version by the Bangles.

== Background ==
The original version of the song appeared on Katrina and the Waves' 1982 EP Shock Horror! (with the band then simply named the Waves). Soon thereafter, they re-recorded the song for inclusion on their 1983 debut full-length album Walking on Sunshine, which was only released in Canada. The version included on both releases featured Rew on lead vocals.

When the band signed with major label Capitol Records, the song was re-recorded again with Katrina Leskanich on lead vocals and included on their 1985 self-titled album. Although never released as a single, it was featured as the B-side of two of the band's singles, "Plastic Man" and their breakthrough hit "Walking on Sunshine".

== The Bangles version ==
"Going Down to Liverpool"
- 1986 UK reissue cover

Single by the Bangles

from the album All Over the Place
- B-side: "Dover Beach"
- Released: September 1984 (US); March 1985 (UK)
- Genre: Paisley Underground; pop; new wave; jangle pop
- Length: 3:40
- Label: Discos CBS; Columbia
- Songwriter: Kimberley Rew
- Producer: David Kahne

The Bangles singles chronology
"Hero Takes a Fall" (1984)	"Going Down to Liverpool" (1984)	"Manic Monday" (1986)

Music video
- "Going Down to Liverpool" on YouTube

American band the Bangles covered the song on their 1984 major label debut album All Over the Place. The song features lead vocals by drummer Debbi Peterson and it was released as the album's second single, one of only two singles with Peterson on lead vocals, the other being "Be with You". The song had been introduced by a friend to Vicki Peterson, who immediately liked it and urged the band to record a cover.

The single failed to chart in the U.S., and became a minor UK hit in April 1985, peaking at No. 79. The single's B-side was the album track "Dover Beach", and the 12" single featured three songs from their Bangles EP on the B-side.

When the band found success with their subsequent album Different Light, "Going Down to Liverpool" was re-released as a single in the UK and Ireland in 1986 after the release of "If She Knew What She Wants", with new cover artwork and featuring the Different Light album track "Let It Go". This time the single fared better but still only became a minor hit, peaking at No. 56, while it became a top 40 hit in Ireland peaking at No. 21.

=== Music video ===
The music video for the song was directed by Tamar Simon Hoffs, the mother of Bangles member Susanna Hoffs. The video features the band inside a car being driven around by a chauffeur, who appears to be unimpressed by the group (at one point he turns off the car radio, stopping the song). The car stops inside a tunnel and the girls walk towards the end of it, which cuts to the band playing and dancing over a red background. After the girls leave the car, the chauffeur ends up tapping his fingers on the steering wheel. Leonard Nimoy played the part of the chauffeur; this came about due to Nimoy being a friend of Tamar and Susanna's family. The video entered rotation on MTV in mid-October 1984.

=== Critical reception ===
On 1986 British single release Sean O'Hagan left an ironic review for New Musical Express. As per him "The Bangles just transcend their spiritual roots here, and provide a hard-edged hymn to the joys of life on the dole."

=== Charts ===
Chart (1985)	Peak position
UK Singles Chart	79
Dutch Singles Chart	48
New Zealand Singles Chart	42
Chart (1986)	Peak position
UK Singles Chart	56
Irish Singles Chart	21
