= Katrina Leskanich =

American singer (born 1960)

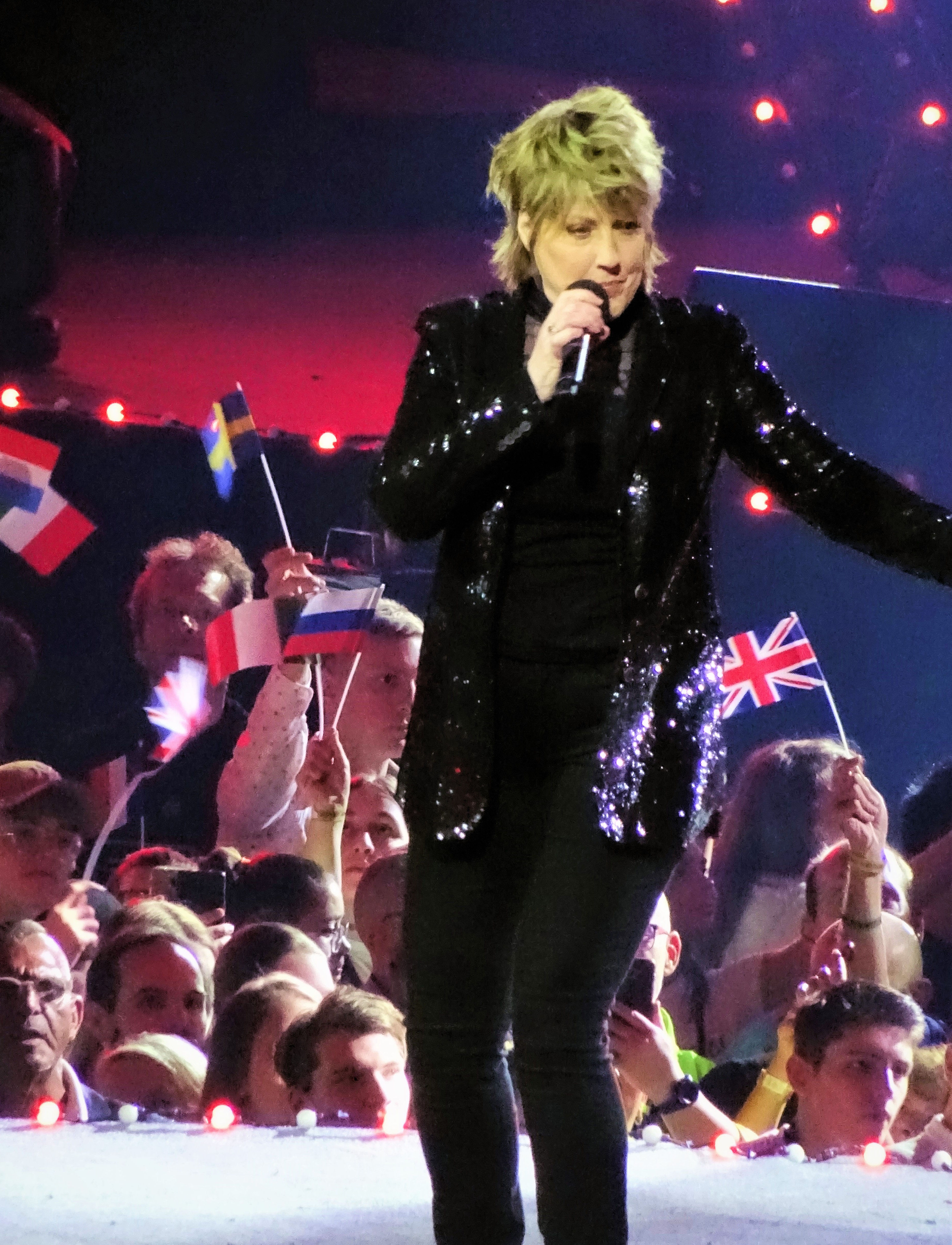
- Leskanich performing in 2019

Background information
- Born: Katrina Elizabeth Leskanich; April 10, 1960 (age 66); Topeka, Kansas, U.S.
- Genres: New wave, pop rock
- Occupations: Singer, musician
- Instruments: Vocals, guitar
- Years active: 1981–present
- Labels: Capitol, UMG, Virgin, Warner Bros., BMG, EMI, Katsweb
- Spouse: Sher Harper
- Website: katrinasweb.com

Katrina Elizabeth Leskanich (/lɛˈskɑːnɪtʃ/ lesk-AH-nitch; born April 10, 1960) is an American singer and musician and the former lead singer of the British pop rock band Katrina and the Waves. The band's song "Walking on Sunshine" was an international hit in 1985. In 1997, the band won the Eurovision Song Contest for the United Kingdom with the song "Love Shine a Light". Both songs were written by Leskanich's long-term bandmate Kimberley Rew.

== Early life ==
Leskanich was born in Topeka, Kansas. Her father was a Vietnam veteran who became a colonel in the United States Air Force. Katrina and her five siblings moved frequently as children. The family arrived in the United Kingdom in 1976. She graduated from RAF Lakenheath high school in 1978.

== Early career ==
Mama's Cookin', a pop cover band from Feltwell, Norfolk, England, was founded in 1978. It featured Leskanich on vocals and keyboards, her then-boyfriend (and fellow American) Vince de la Cruz on vocals and lead guitar, and Marcos de la Cruz on drums. By late 1980, Alex Cooper had joined the band on drums, with Bob Jakins on bass. Mama's Cookin' proceeded to gig steadily in England over the next two years, specializing in covers of songs by American acts.

In 1981, singer-songwriter Kimberley Rew joined Mama's Cookin', and the five-piece group was quickly renamed The Waves after a band Rew and Cooper had been in together in the mid-1970s. Rew initially fronted the Waves. However, over the first year of the Waves' existence, Rew began to write material for Leskanich to sing, and she was soon the primary vocalist. The Waves made their initial recorded appearances on a 1982 single ("Nightmare"/"Hey, War Pig!"); both tracks were included on the 1982 Rew solo album called The Bible of Bop. The Waves issued their debut EP, Shock Horror!, later in 1982. Around this time, bassist Jakins left the band. He was not replaced, as de la Cruz took over on bass, and the band was rechristened Katrina and the Waves.

== Katrina and the Waves ==
=== Early Canadian success (1983–84) ===
In early 1983, the fledgling band recorded—at their own expense—an LP of their original material to sell at gigs. Rew wrote all the songs on this LP, while Leskanich sang eight of the album's ten tracks.

The LP was shopped around to various labels, but only Attic Records in Canada responded with an offer. Consequently, although they were based in England, Katrina and The Waves' first album Walking on Sunshine was released only in Canada.

The album garnered enough critical attention and radio play to merit a Canadian tour. In 1984, the group released a follow-up album in Canada (Katrina and the Waves 2), with Leskanich now handling all the lead vocals. The same year, their song "Going Down to Liverpool" was covered by The Bangles, which added to their profile—with the group building a fan base with their recordings and extensive touring, major label interest began to build. Katrina and the Waves signed an international deal with Capitol Records in 1985.

=== "Walking on Sunshine" and international success (1985–89) ===
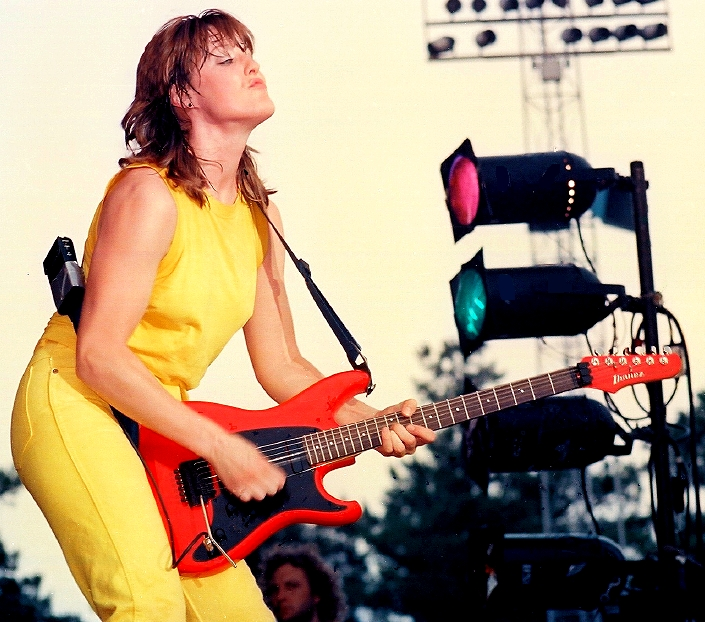
Leskanich performing in 1986 at a concert

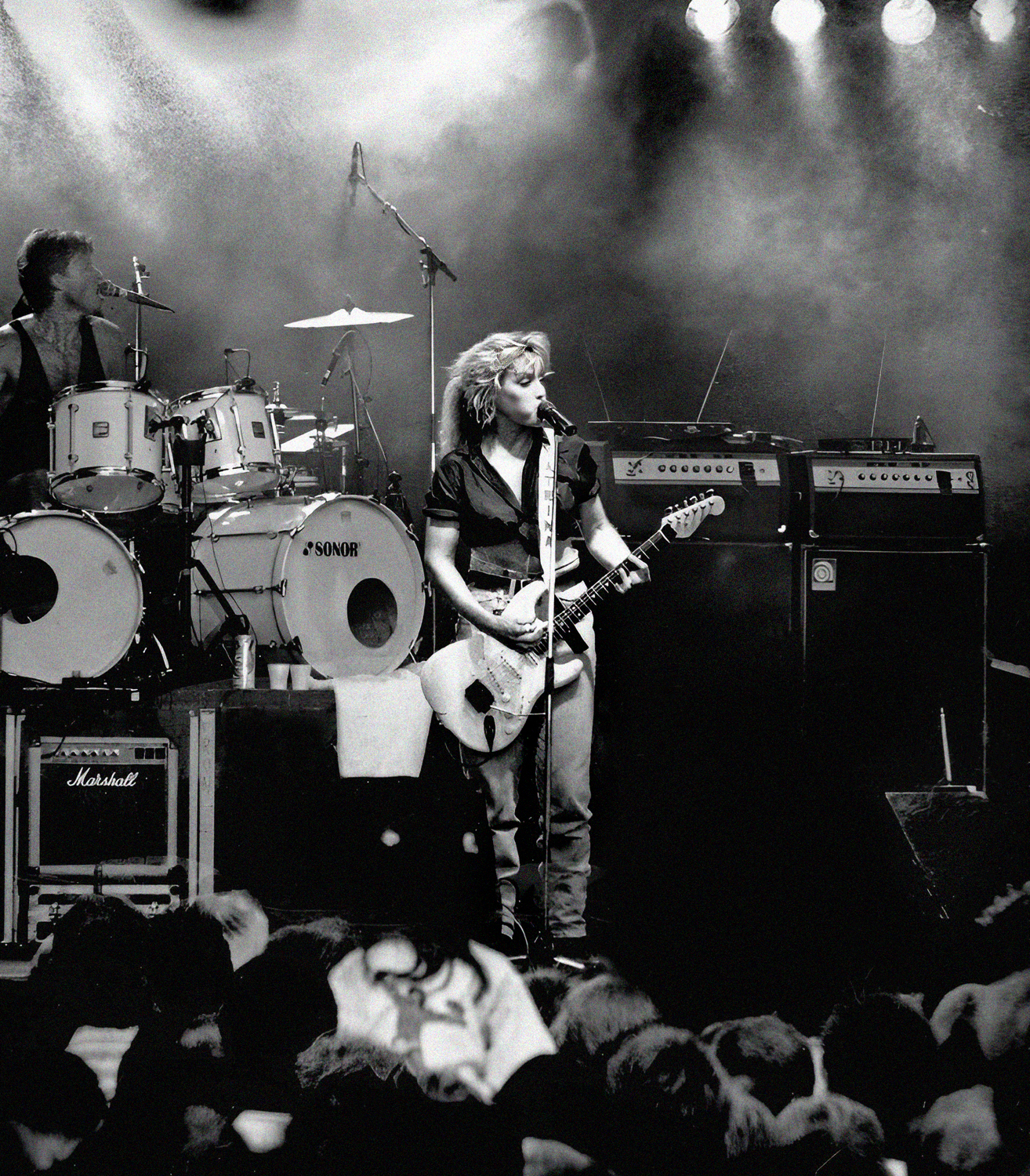
Katrina and the Waves during a live performance in Malmö, August 14, 1988

The band re-recorded, remixed, or overdubbed 10 songs from their earlier Canadian releases to create their self-titled international debut album in 1985.

The Katrina and the Waves album was a substantial critical and commercial success, and the group had a worldwide hit with the song "Walking on Sunshine," (No. 9 US, No. 8 UK, a completely re-recorded, and substantially rearranged version of the song compared to its initial 1983 Canada-only release). A Grammy award nomination for "Best New Artist" followed, and a tour, both of which helped to spur sales of new releases. A follow-up single called "Do You Want Crying" (written by de la Cruz) also became a top 40 US hit, reaching No. 37 in the late summer of 1985.

The band's follow-up album, entitled Waves, did not meet with the same measure of success as the first album. The album did spin off a minor UK and US hit in the form of the Rew-penned "Is That It?" (No. 70 US, No. 82 UK). "Sun Street" (a de la Cruz composition) was a UK Top 30 hit in 1986. However, Capitol dropped the band after the Waves album failed to meet expectations. The band subsequently recorded a 1989 album for Capitol-distributed SBK Records called Break of Hearts, a harder, more rock-oriented effort than their previous releases. The album included "That's the Way", which reached No. 16 in the US.

=== Downturn, comeback, and breakup (1990–97) ===
Throughout the 1990s, Katrina and the Waves recorded fairly steadily, though most releases were available only in continental Europe and/or Canada. They also recorded the song "We Gotta Get Out of This Place" with Eric Burdon for the TV series China Beach in 1990.

On May 3, 1997, after having somewhat faded into obscurity, the band won the Eurovision Song Contest 1997 for the United Kingdom with "Love Shine a Light". Reacting to the win, Leskanich said it was the second landslide victory in a week; the song won by a record points margin, and Tony Blair had won the 1997 British general election two days previously. The song won by a then-record margin of 70 points over the Irish runner-up. The song went to No. 3 in the UK Singles Chart (becoming the band's biggest-ever hit) and Katrina and The Waves performed an unprecedented four weeks running on the BBC One TV show Top of the Pops.

Katrina and the Waves broke up in 1999.

"Walking on Sunshine" has been used in many advertisements and films, including:

- Ask Max (1986)
- Secret of My Success (1987)
- Look Who's Talking (1989)
- Bean (1997)
- High Fidelity (2000)
- American Psycho (2000)
- The Master of Disguise (2002)
- Daddy Day Care (2003)
- Walking on Sunshine (2014)

Katrina and The Waves' song covers include:

- Bangles "Going Down to Liverpool" (1984)
- Dolly Parton "Walking on Sunshine" on her Treasures album (1996)
- Celine Dion "That's Just The Woman in Me" (2008)
- Glee cast mash up of "Walking on Sunshine" and Beyoncé "Halo" (2010)
- "Walking on Sunshine" has also been featured several times on American Idol, X Factor and The Voice.

"Walking on Sunshine" continues to be one of the most popular songs from the 1980s with over 700 million streams on Spotify, and over 6 million monthly listeners.

== Solo career ==
After the Waves broke up in 1999, Leskanich launched a solo career. She released her first solo CD, Katrina Leskanich, through Universal Records in Britain in 2005.

In February 2005, Leskanich participated in the Melodifestivalen 2005 pre-selection for Sweden's Eurovision Song Contest entry. She did a duet with the band 'The Nameless' in the 4th semi final. Their song 'As If Tomorrow Will Never Come' came 3rd in the semi-final, progressing to the Second Chance round, where they came 6th and did not qualify for the final.

In 2005, Leskanich reflected on sharing her name with a hurricane that devastated the U.S. Gulf Coast in late August and early September of that year, after the name "Katrina and the Waves" appeared on numerous news television shows, headlines, and blog postings that were covering her namesake hurricane. When a New York Times reporter contacted her about this, she said: "The first time I opened the paper and saw 'Katrina kills 9,' it was a bit of a shock. ... I hope that the true spirit of 'Walking on Sunshine' will prevail. I would hate for the title to be tinged with sadness, and I will have to do my part to help turn that around." She also stated that she hoped that "Walking on Sunshine" would become an anthem for the Gulf Coast's recovery.

To celebrate the 25th Anniversary of "Walking on Sunshine", Leskanich released her first live album The Live Album, in July 2010. The album includes both a live version and a blues version of "Walking on Sunshine". "I have performed 'Walking on Sunshine' for so many years in so many different countries that it's become the one constant in my life and the one thing I can count on to bring happiness to myself and others" said Leskanich. As part of the 25th Anniversary celebrations, Leskanich also performed 'Walking on Sunshine' on GMTV.

In September 2010, Leskanich re-released her solo album Turn The Tide with two bonus tracks: the club mix of "They Don't Know" and the Espirito mix of "Walking on Sunshine". In May 2011, Leskanich released an EP entitled Spiritualize. "In 1999 I wrote, collected and compiled some songs I thought would come together for an uplifting and spiritual type of album. I thought I'd try to make this a bit more personal" said Leskanich.

In 2013, Leskanich and her new band performed at festivals in the UK and Europe, including the San Fermín festival in Pamplona in Spain on Plaza del Castillo, and the Steinegg Festival in Italy. In 2014, Leskanich, a firm believer in animal rights, supported Wildlife Rocks with an acoustic performance. Other performers included Queen lead guitarist and founder of the Save Me organization, Brian May. The event raised awareness for vital wildlife projects, and was attended by several members of Parliament. The year end saw Leskanich perform on Hubei TV's Global New Year Revelry in Beijing

Leskanich released her second solo album, Blisland, which was inspired by the genre of music from her formative years. "I wanted to record an album that reflected my love of all the genres of music I grew up listening to, from Peter Frampton Live (sic) to Neil Young's Harvest. I fell in love with the South West of England; the beautiful beaches reminded me of California, and a little village called Blisland not only had a fantastic little pub but also gave me the perfect name for my new album."

In the summer of 2014 Leskanich performed at many UK and European festivals including Festival Too in Norfolk, Guilfest in Surrey, Audley End in Essex, Nostalgie Beach Festival in Belgium and the Flashback Festival at Clumber Park in Nottinghamshire. Leskanich went on to tour North America on the Retro Futura Tour with other 80s artists including Thompson Twins, Tom Bailey, Howard Jones, Midge Ure and China Crisis. In 2015 Leskanich performed at the Lasko Beer and Flowers festival in Slovenia, Rewind North at Capesthorne Hall, Pride Cymru, toured South Africa on the Rewind Tour and toured on her own in North America.

In 2016, Leskanich performed at festivals including We Love the 80s at the Telenor Arena in Oslo, Maspalomas Pride in Gran Canaria, Let's Rock the Moor in Cookham, Let's Rock Bristol, Let's Rock Leeds, and took part in the BBC's Eurovision: You Decide, toured Australia on the 'Totally 80s' Tour and toured in Sweden during the summer.

In 2017 Leskanich performed at various festivals including the Lotos 2017 Music Festival in Boca Raton, Florida with other 80s and 90s artists including Boy George and Ace of Base, Let's Rock Exeter, Let's Rock London, Let's Rock Southampton, Bristol Pride, and Manchester Pride. Leskanich toured the US with the Retro Futura Tour 2017 with 80s artists including Howard Jones, Paul Young, The English Beat and Modern English and in May 2017 released her first compilation album, The Very Best of Katrina. In 2018 Leskanich released her first Christmas single, "I Can't Give You Anything but Love". Leskanich also performed at Let's Rock Xmas at the SSE Wembley Arena and for the BBC's Children in Need Rocks the 80s charity fundraiser also at the SSE Wembley Arena.

In 2018 Leskanich performed on the 80's Cruise with 80s artists including Billy Ocean and Rick Springfield and at various festivals in the UK and Europe including Let's Rock Norwich, Let's Rock Scotland, Let's Rock Shrewsbury, Irlam Live in Manchester, W-Fest in Kluisbergen, Belgium.

2019 saw Leskanich performing at festivals around Europe including Yo Fui a EGB at Palau St Jordi in Barcelona, Donauinselfest in Vienna, Austria, Roze Zaterdag (Venlo Pride) in Venlo, Netherlands, Forever Young festival, Dublin, Ireland, Hestholmen Retrofestival in Norway, Skeikampenfestivalen, Gausdal in Norway, Top of the Top Sopot festival in Gdansk, Poland, and Gottschalks 80s TV show in Hanover, Germany.

In 2020, Leskanich was invited back to perform at Yo Fui a EGB at the Wizink Centre in Madrid and to the 80s Cruise.

The Eurovision Song Contest 2020 was cancelled due to the COVID-19 pandemic, and therefore the EBU decided to organize Eurovision: Europe Shine a Light as an alternative. The name was inspired by the song "Love Shine a Light" by Katrina and the Waves which won the Eurovision Song Contest 1997. Closing the show, most of the artists performed "Love Shine a Light" from their respective home countries with Leskanich singing the last line.

In July 2020, Leskanich released the single "Drive" which garnered many plays on BBC Radio 2 and BBC local radio stations. This was followed by the release of her album, Hearts, Loves & Babys and a second single, "I Want to Love Again".

COVID-19 put an end to any further touring until the summer of 2021 when Leskanich performed at Rewind North, Rewind South, Back to the 80s 90s festival in Leicestershire and Feile an Phobail in Belfast, Northern Ireland.

In 2022 Leskanich performed at various festivals in the UK and Europe, including the Upton House Concerts in Poole, Fest i Vest in Stord, Norway, Bristol Pride, Ravnedalen Live in Kristiansand, Norway, Here and Now at Tamworth Castle, Night of the Proms in Koksijde, Belgium, City of Guitars in Locarno, Switzerland and Arena Suzuki in Verona in Italy.

Leskanich joined The Beach Boys on the Beach Boys Good Vibrations Cruise, together with The Temptations, The Isley Brothers and many more. Other performances in 2023 included Tinghallen in Viborg, Denmark, Israel Calling in Tel Aviv, Eurovision in Concert in Amsterdam and two performances at the Eurovision Village in Liverpool in May when the UK hosted Eurovision on behalf of Ukraine. Plus shows in the Faeroe Islands, Belgium, Norway, Estonia, Europride in Malta, 80s in the Sand in Cancun and The Greatest 80s tour of Sweden in November and December.

Leskanich released a new single, 'Shut Your Mouth' on 21 April 2023.

In 2024 Leskanich performed at Rewind Scotland in Perth, Rewind North in Macclesfield and Rewind South in Henley-on-Thames. And performed at UK festivals and Prides including AppFest, Boogietown, Liverpool Pride and the ABBA Eurovision celebration at Brighton Dome. In April Leskanich released a cover of Petula Clark's 'I Couldn't Live Without Your Love' written by Tony Hatch and Jackie Trent which was Number One in the Heritage Chart in June. This was followed by a re-release of 'I Can't Give You Anything but Love' which reached Number 2 in the Heritage Chart in January 2025.

== Other work and personal life ==
She is married to Sher Harper with whom she entered into a civil union in 2008 in England. Harper is also Leskanich's professional manager.

Leskanich and Harper co-wrote Peggy Lee Loves London – My London Guide (2013), a quirky photographic guidebook about London. In 2025, Leskanich and Harper published a new dog-friendly travel guide, Peggy Lee Loves Cornwall - My Cornwall Guide (2025)

She is the cousin of former Major League Baseball player Curtis Leskanic.

== Discography ==
=== Solo ===
==== Solo albums ====
- Turn the Tide Limited release 2004
- Katrina Leskanich released in 2006 – Universal Distribution
- The Live Album digital release July 2010
- Turn the Tide digital re-release with bonus tracks September 2010
- Spiritualize digital release May 2011
- Blisland digital release August 19, 2014
- The Very Best of Katrina digital release May 3, 2017
- Hearts, Loves & Babys digital release August 28, 2020

==== Compilations ====
- We Gotta Get out of This Place with Eric Burdon – China Beach 1989 SBK
- Ride of Your Life – Return to the Centre of the Earth (Rick Wakeman) 1999 EMI
- Scar – This Is Not Retro – This Is the Eighties Up to Date 2005
- They Don't Know – Gylne tider 2 2007 Sony BMG
- Hitsville UK – The Sandinista Project 2007 3:59 Records
- Walking on Sunshine (live and studio version) – Countdown Spectacular 2 (2007) Liberation Blue Records (Australian-only release)

==== Singles ====
- "They Don't Know" digital release in 2006
- "They Don't Know" Club Mixes – Katrina vs Sleazesisters digital release 2008
- "Sun Coming Upper" digital release March 2015
- "I Can't Give You Anything but Love" digital release November 2018
- "Drive" digital release July 2020
- "I Want to Love Again" digital release August 2020
- "Holiday" digital release 2022
- "Shut Your Mouth" digital release April 2023
- "I Couldn't Live Without Your Love" digital release April 2024
- "Honey Lamb" digital release October 2025

==== Other appearances ====
- "Don't Follow Me" – Hanoi Rocks 1983 – backing vocals
- "Torn" – Natalie Imbruglia 1997 – backing vocals
- "I Quit" – Hepburn 1998 – backing vocals
- "Ride of Your Life" from Return to the Centre of the Earth – Rick Wakeman 1999 – guest vocals
- "Help Me Help You" – Holly Valance 2003 – backing vocals

=== With Katrina and the Waves ===
==== Albums ====
- The Bible of Bop (Kimberley Rew) 1982 Armageddon Records
- Shock Horror 1982 (The Waves) Aftermath Records
- Walking on Sunshine 1983 Attic Records
- The 2nd LP 1984 Attic Records
- Katrina & The Waves 1985 Capitol Records
- Waves 1986 Capitol Records
- Break of Hearts 1989 SBK Records
- Pet the Tiger 1991 Virgin Germany
- Edge of the Land 1993 Polydor
- Turnaround 1994 Polydor
- Roses 1995 Polydor
- Walk on Water 1997 Warner Music

==== Best-of albums ====
- The Best Of 1991 Attic Records
- Anthology 1995 One Way Records
- KATW/Waves 1996 BGO Records
- Premium Gold Collection 1997 EMI
- Greatest Hits of 1997 EMI
- Walking on Sunshine 1997 Polygram Records
- The Original Recordings 2003 BongoBeat Records

==== Singles ====
- "The Nightmare" 1982 (The Waves) Armagedon Records
- "Brown Eyed Son" 1982 (The Waves) Albion Records
- "Plastic Man" 1984 Silvertown Records
- "Walking on Sunshine" 1985 Capitol Records
- "Red Wine & Whisky" 1985 Capitol Records
- "Do You Want Crying?" 1985 Capitol Records
- "Que te quiero" 1985 Capitol Records
- "Mexico" 1985 Capitol Records
- "Is That It" 1986 Capitol Records
- "Tears for Me" 1986 Capitol Records
- "Lovely Lindsey" 1986 Capitol Records
- "Sun Street" 1986 Capitol Records
- "That's the Way" 1989 SBK Records
- "Rock 'n' Roll Girl" 1989 SBK Records
- "We Gotta Get out of This Place" 1989 SBK Records
- "Pet the Tiger" 1991 Virgin Records
- "Tears of a Woman" 1991 Virgin Records
- "Birkenhead Garbage Pickers" 1992 Virgin Records
- "I'm in Deep" 1993 Polydor
- "Cookin'" 1994 Polydor
- "The Street Where You Live" 1995 Polydor
- "Honey Lamb" 1995 Polydor
- "Turnaround" 1995 Polydor
- "Walking Where the Roses Grow" 1995 Polydor
- "Brown Eyed Son" 1997 Top Line records
- "Love Shine a Light" 1997 Warner Music
- "Walk on Water" 1997 Warner Music

Awards and achievements
Preceded by (Republic of Ireland) Eimear Quinn with "The Voice"	Winner of the Eurovision Song Contest; 1997 (as part of Katrina and the Waves)	Succeeded by (Israel) Dana International with "Diva"
Preceded by Gina G with "Ooh Aah... Just a Little Bit"	United Kingdom in the Eurovision Song Contest; 1997 (as part of Katrina and the Waves)	Succeeded by Imaani with "Where Are You?"
