= Kimberley Rew =

British musician (born 1951)

- Born: Kimberley Charles Rew; 3 December 1951 (age 74); Bristol, England
- Origin: British
- Genres: Pop rock, new wave
- Occupations: Singer-songwriter; guitarist
- Instrument: Electric guitar
- Years active: 1981–present
- Formerly of: The Soft Boys; Katrina and the Waves

Kimberley Charles Rew (born 3 December 1951) is an English rock singer-songwriter and guitarist. He was a member of Katrina and the Waves from 1981 to 1999 and of Robyn Hitchcock's the Soft Boys from 1978 to 1981. For Katrina and the Waves, he wrote "Walking on Sunshine" and "Love Shine a Light". The latter was performed as the United Kingdom's entry at the Eurovision Song Contest 1997, taking the country to its first victory in the contest since 1981.

== Early life ==
Rew is from Bristol and his family moved house several times during his boyhood. He joined Harrow County School for Boys at the age of 14, being known for being good at Ancient Greek and Latin, and playing the guitar. He lived at 206 Torbay Road, in South Harrow. In 1970, he gained a place at Jesus College, Cambridge, to study Modern Languages, on an exhibition. Another boy from his school joining the university at the same time was Geoff Egan. At Cambridge, Rew gained a degree in archaeology, receiving a 2.1, and settled in that city.

== Career ==
After a brief excursion into archaeology at West Stow Anglo-Saxon Village, in 1975 Rew formed the Waves with drummer Alex Cooper, named after Virginia Woolf's novel. The group first played together at the Galaxy Club at RAF Mildenhall in 1980. In the interim, Rew joined the Soft Boys in 1978, recording the albums A Can of Bees that year and Underwater Moonlight in 1980. Not finding commercial success or much critical response, Soft Boys' leader Robyn Hitchcock began his solo career in 1981 while Rew and Cooper merged The Waves with Katrina Leskanich and Vince de la Cruz to form Katrina and the Waves.

The group survived a slow career climb through tours of RAF bases and Canadian club gigs, then teamed up with the producers Pat Collier and Scott Litt to record Rew's compositions "Going Down to Liverpool", covered by the Bangles, and, in 1985, "Walking on Sunshine", which became the group's first and biggest hit.

In 1997, Rew was living on Mill Road, Cambridge when Katrina and the Waves won the Eurovision Song Contest for the United Kingdom with Rew's composition "Love Shine a Light". The song was written for the Samaritans' 30th anniversary.

In 1999, Leskanich left the band to pursue a solo career. Rew continued to write, record and release solo albums. From 1988 through to 2004, he was a guest member of the Cambridge band the Lonely. He played on three albums, Underground (1989), Rarer Gifts (1998) and Live (2000).

In 2001, Rew reunited and toured with Robyn Hitchcock, bassist Matthew Seligman, and drummer Morris Windsor for the Soft Boys' re-release of their 1980 album Underwater Moonlight. The following year they recorded and released a new album, Nextdoorland, which was accompanied by a short album of outtakes, Side Three.

In 2004, Rew joined Cambridge band Jack, which his wife Lee Cave-Berry had already joined in 2000. The two also perform together as a duo called Kim and Lee.

== Solo discography ==
- The Bible of Bop (1982)
- Tunnel into Summer (2000)
- Great Central Revisited (2003)
- Essex Hideaway (2005)
- Ridgeway (EP) (2006)
- The Safest Place (2010)
- Strawberry Fair (2011)
- Technically Closer than Tooting (2012)
- Healing Broadway (2013)
- The Next Big Adventure (2014)
- Are We There Yet, Daddy? (2015)
- Miles of Smiles (2016)
- Purple Kittens (2021)
