= The Bangles discography =

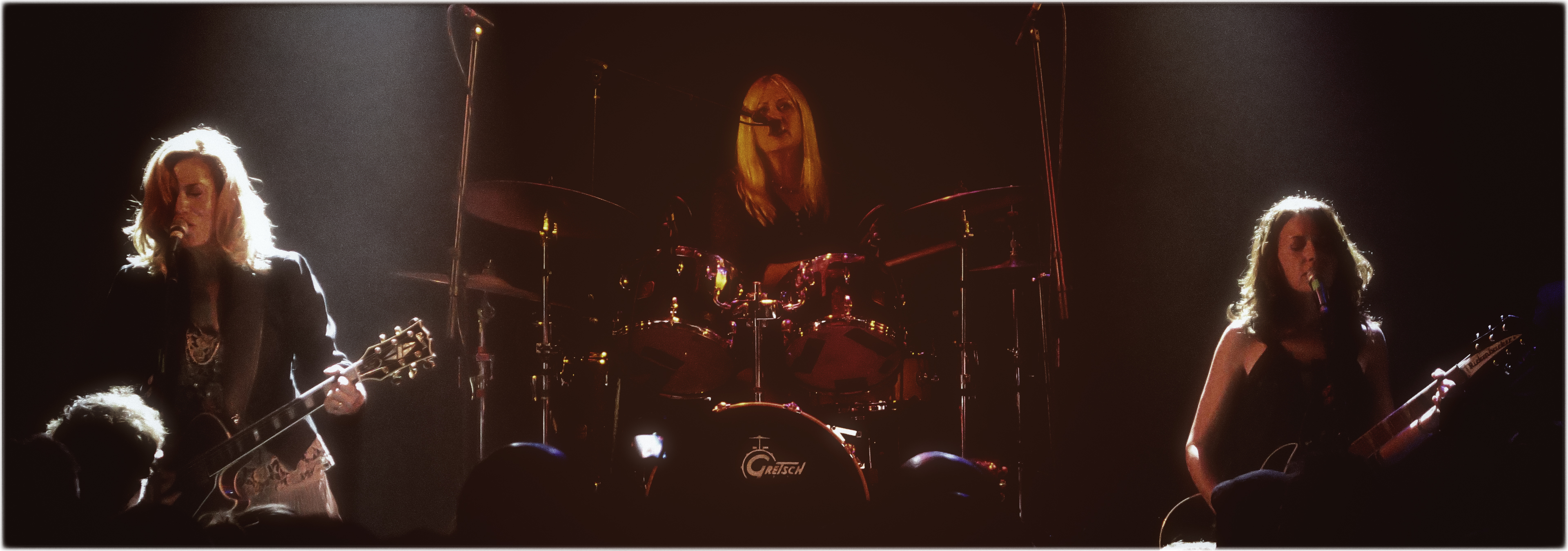
- The Bangles at The Troubadour in Los Angeles on November 1, 2014
- Studio albums: 5
- Extended plays: 1
- Compilation albums: 10
- Singles: 25
- Video albums: 3
- Music videos: 13

The discography of the Bangles, an American all-female band, consists of five studio albums, ten compilation albums, one extended play, twenty-five singles, and three video albums.

== Albums ==
=== Studio albums ===
Year	Album details	Peak chart positions									Certifications (sales thresholds)
Year	Album details	US	AUS	CAN	GER	NL	NZ	SWE	SWI	UK	Certifications (sales thresholds)
1984	All Over the Place: Released: May 23, 1984; Label: Columbia; Formats: CD, CS, LP	80	—	—	—	—	32	40	—	86	
1986	Different Light: Released: January 10, 1986; Label: Columbia; Formats: CD, CS, LP	2	2	8	21	26	4	24	16	3	RIAA: 3× Platinum; ARIA: 2× Platinum; BPI: Platinum; MC: 2× Platinum; RMNZ: Platinum
1988	Everything: Released: October 18, 1988; Label: Columbia; Formats: CD, CS, LP	15	7	34	15	4	15	20	10	5	RIAA: Platinum; ARIA: Platinum; BPI: Platinum; IFPI SWI: Gold; MC: Platinum; RMNZ: Gold
2003	Doll Revolution: Released: September 9, 2003; Label: Koch; Formats: CD, CS	—	—	—	35	—	—	—	80	62	
2011	Sweetheart of the Sun: Released: September 27, 2011; Label: Waterfront; Formats: CD, vinyl LP	148	—	—	—	—	—	—	—	—	
" — " denotes releases that did not chart or were not released in that country.

=== Compilation albums ===
Year	Album details	Peak chart positions								Certifications
Year	Album details	US	AUS	CAN	GER	NL	NZ	NO	UK	Certifications
1990	Greatest Hits: Released: May 8, 1990; Label: Columbia; Formats: CD, CS, LP	97	6	54	31	13	6	—	4	RIAA: Platinum; ARIA: Platinum; BPI: Platinum; IFPI SWI: Gold; NVPI: Gold; RMNZ: Gold
1995	September Gurls: Released: October, 1995; Label: Columbia; Formats: CD, CS, LP	—	—	—	—	—	—	—	—	
1998	Simply the Best: Released: 1998; Label: Columbia/Sony Music (Germany); Formats: CD, CS, LP	—	—	—	—	—	—	—	—	
1998	Super Hits: Released: July 21, 1998; Label: Columbia; Formats: CD, CS	—	—	—	—	—	—	—	—	
1999	Best of the Bangles: Released: May, 1999; Label: Columbia; Formats: CD, CS	—	—	—	—	—	—	—	—	BPI: Silver
2001	Eternal Flame – The Best of the Bangles: Released: 2001; Label: Columbia; Formats: CD, LP	—	—	—	—	—	—	15	15	BPI: Silver
2004	The Essential Bangles: Released: 2004; Label: Columbia; Formats: CD	—	—	—	—	—	—	—	—	
2005	Glitter Years: Rarities & Gems: Released: 2005; Label: Sony BMG; Formats: CD	—	—	—	—	—	—	—	—	
2008	Playlist: The Very Best of the Bangles: Released: 2008; Label: Columbia/Legacy; Formats: CD	—	—	—	—	—	—	—	—	
2014	Ladies and Gentlemen... The Bangles!: Released: 2014; Label: Down Kiddie!; Format: Digital download	—	—	—	—	—	—	—	—	
2020	Gold: Released: 2020; Label: Crimson; Format: 3-CD set	—	—	—	—	—	—	—	38	
" — " denotes releases that did not chart or were not released in that country.

- 3 × 4 (2018 compilation with Dream Syndicate, Rain Parade and The Three O'Clock) Yep Roc Records - #27 Billboard Independent Albums

== Extended plays ==
Year	Title
1982	Bangles: Released: June 1982; Label: Faulty Products; Re-released: 1983; Label: I.R.S. Records; Format: Vinyl, CS

== Singles ==
Year	Title	Peak chart positions										Certifications (sales thresholds)	Album
Year	Title	US	AUS	CAN	GER	IRE	NL	NZ	SWE	SWI	UK	Certifications (sales thresholds)	Album
1981	"Getting Out of Hand"	—	—	—	—	—	—	—	—	—	—		non-album single
1984	"Hero Takes a Fall"	—	—	—	—	—	—	—	—	—	96		All Over the Place
1984	"Going Down to Liverpool"	—	—	—	—	—	48	42	—	—	79		All Over the Place
1985	"Manic Monday"	2	3	2	2	2	22	5	2	4	2	BPI: Gold; MC: Gold	Different Light
1986	"If She Knew What She Wants"	29	31	29	17	23	—	39	33	20	31		Different Light
1986	"Going Down to Liverpool" (reissue)	—	—	—	—	21	—	—	—	—	56		All Over the Place
1986	"Walk Like an Egyptian"	1	1	1	1	2	1	2	9	8	3	RIAA: Gold; BPI: Platinum; MC: Gold; NVPI: Platinum	Different Light
1986	"Walking Down Your Street"	11	56	26	32	4	21	21	—	—	16		Different Light
1987	"Following"	—	—	—	—	22	—	—	—	—	55		Different Light
1987	"Hazy Shade of Winter"	2	7	3	52	8	14	12	—	17	11		Less than Zero (soundtrack)
1988	"The Real World"	—	—	—	—	—	—	—	—	—	—		Bangles (EP)
1988	"In Your Room"	5	41	8	—	25	—	11	—	—	35		Everything
1989	"Eternal Flame"	1	1	2	4	1	1	4	1	2	1	RIAA: Gold; ARIA: Platinum; BPI: Gold; IFPI SWE: Gold; NVPI: Platinum	Everything
1989	"Be with You"	30	37	47	32	14	26	41	19	—	23		Everything
1989	"I'll Set You Free"	—	81	—	—	—	—	—	—	—	74		Everything
1990	"Everything I Wanted"	—	—	—	—	—	41	—	—	—	—		Greatest Hits
1990	"Walk Like an Egyptian" (remix)	—	—	—	—	—	—	—	—	—	73		Greatest Hits
1990	"The Eternal Mix"	—	—	—	—	—	—	—	—	—	—		Greatest Hits
2003	"Something That You Said"	—	102	—	63	—	96	—	28	55	38		Doll Revolution
2003	"Tear Off Your Own Head"	—	—	—	—	—	—	—	—	—	—		Doll Revolution
2003	"I Will Take Care of You"	—	—	—	—	—	—	—	—	—	79		Doll Revolution
2006	"Light My Way"	—	—	—	—	—	—	—	—	—	—		Digital single
2011	"I'll Never Be Through with You"	—	—	—	—	—	—	—	—	—	—		Sweetheart of the Sun
2011	"Anna Lee (Sweetheart of the Sun)"	—	—	—	—	—	—	—	—	—	—		Sweetheart of the Sun
" — " denotes releases that did not chart or were not released in that country.

== Video albums ==
Year	Title	Certifications
1990	Greatest Hits: Released: May, 1990; Label: Sony Music; Format: VHS (1990), DVD (2005)	RIAA: Gold
2003	Doll Revolution DVD: Released: September 9, 2003; Label: Koch Records; Format: DVD	
2007	Return to Bangleonia: Released: April, 2007; Label: Koch Records; Format: DVD	

== Music videos ==
Year	Title	Director(s)
1983	"The Real World"	Frank Delia
1984	"Hero Takes a Fall"	David Rathod
1984	"Going Down to Liverpool"	Tamar Hoffs
1986	"Manic Monday"	Leslie Libman
1986	"If She Knew What She Wants"	Dan Perri
1986	"Walk Like an Egyptian"	Gary Weis
1987	"Walking Down Your Street"	Gary Weis
1987	"A Hazy Shade of Winter"	Jim Shea
1988	"In Your Room"	Tamra Davis
1988	"Eternal Flame"	Tim Pope
1989	"Be with You"	Marty Callner
1990	"Everything I Wanted"	
2003	"Something That You Said"	Charles Jensen
