= The Essential Bangles =

Greatest hits album by The Bangles
- Released: March 30, 2004
- Recorded: 1981–1988
- Genre: Pop rock
- Length: 49:41
- Label: Columbia
- Producers: David Kahne, Davitt Sigerson, Rick Rubin, Craig Leon

The Bangles chronology
Doll Revolution (2003)	The Essential Bangles (2004)	Sweetheart of the Sun (2011)

Professional ratings
Review scores
Source	Rating
AllMusic	4/5 stars

The Essential Bangles is a greatest hits album by American pop rock band the Bangles, released in 2004. The album includes 15 tracks from the band's first three studio albums, as well as non-studio album recordings and soundtrack contributions. It was released as a part of Sony BMG's The Essential series.

== Track listing ==
No.	Title	Writer(s)	Origin	Length
1.	"Manic Monday"	Prince	Different Light (1986)	3:05
2.	"Walking Down Your Street"	Susanna Hoffs, Louis Gutierrez, David Kahne	Different Light	3:04
3.	"I Got Nothing"	Hoffs, Vicki Peterson, Jules Shear	The Goonies: Original Motion Picture Soundtrack (1985)	3:12
4.	"If She Knew What She Wants"	Jules Shear	Different Light	3:51
5.	"Eternal Flame"	Hoffs, Billy Steinberg, Tom Kelly	Everything (1988)	3:58
6.	"Getting Out of Hand"	V. Peterson	Non-album single (1981)	2:15
7.	"I'll Set You Free"	Hoffs, Dan Navarro, Eric Lowen	Everything	4:47
8.	"Walk Like an Egyptian"	Liam Sternberg	Different Light	3:24
9.	"What I Meant To Say"	V. Peterson, Debbi Peterson	B-side of "Eternal Flame" (1989)	3:23
10.	"I'm In Line"	Hoffs, V. Peterson, D. Peterson	Bangles (EP) (1982)	3:03
11.	"Be with You"	D. Peterson, Walker Igleheart	Everything	3:04
12.	"In Your Room"	Hoffs, Steinberg, Kelly	Everything	3:29
13.	"Hero Takes a Fall"	Hoffs, V. Peterson	All Over the Place (1984)	2:56
14.	"Hazy Shade of Winter"	Paul Simon	Less than Zero soundtrack (1987)	2:49
15.	"Following"	Michael Steele	Different Light	3:21
Total length:				49:41

== Release history ==
Country	Date	Label	Format	Catalog
United States	2004	Columbia Records	CD, digital download	CK 89065

== Personnel ==
The Bangles

- Susanna Hoffs – rhythm guitar, percussion, vocals
- Vicki Peterson – lead guitar, mandolin, electric sitar, vocals
- Michael Steele – bass guitar, acoustic guitar, vocals
- Debbi Peterson – drums, percussion, vocals
- Annette Zilinskas – bass guitar, harmonica, vocals ("I'm In Line")
