= Greatest Hits (The Bangles album) =

Greatest hits album by the Bangles
- Released: May 8, 1990
- Genres: Pop rock, new wave
- Length: 48:00
- Labels: Columbia; CK 46125
- Producers: David Kahne; Davitt Sigerson; Rick Rubin

The Bangles chronology
| Everything (1988) | Greatest Hits (1990) | Doll Revolution (2003) |

Professional ratings
Review scores
| Source | Rating |
|---|---|
| AllMusic | 4.5/5 stars |
| Q | 4/5 stars |
| Record Mirror | 4/5 |
| The Rolling Stone Album Guide | 3/5 stars |
| Select | 2/5 |
| Spin Alternative Record Guide | 8/10 |
| The Village Voice | A− |

Greatest Hits is a compilation album by American pop rock band the Bangles. It was released by their record company, Columbia Records on May 8, 1990, to fulfill the band's contractual requirements; by the time of the release of the album, the group had already broken up. The album peaked at #97 on the US Billboard 200 and at #4 on the UK Albums Chart.

== Content ==
The album features the single remixes of "Hero Takes a Fall", "Walking Down Your Street" and "I'll Set You Free". It also includes the group's cover of Simon & Garfunkel's "Hazy Shade of Winter", which was released on the soundtrack of the film Less than Zero, and had not been included on a Bangles album. It also contains the non-album B-side cover of the Grass Roots' "Where Were You When I Needed You" and the previously unreleased song "Everything I Wanted" from the Everything album sessions. "Everything I Wanted" was released as a single in the Netherlands and Australia to promote the release. In the UK, a new remix of "Walk Like an Egyptian" was released instead, peaking at #73.

== Track listing ==
Tracks are included in chronological order by album, except the last track.

| No. | Title | Writer(s) | Origin | Length |
|---|---|---|---|---|
| 1. | "Hero Takes a Fall" (Single Mix) | Susanna Hoffs, Vicki Peterson | All Over the Place, 1984 | 2:55 |
| 2. | "Going Down to Liverpool" | Kimberley Rew | All Over the Place | 3:40 |
| 3. | "Manic Monday" | Prince | Different Light, 1986 | 3:06 |
| 4. | "If She Knew What She Wants" | Jules Shear | Different Light | 3:50 |
| 5. | "Walk Like an Egyptian" | Liam Sternberg | Different Light | 3:24 |
| 6. | "Walking Down Your Street" (Single Mix) | Louis Gutierrez, Hoffs, David Kahne | Different Light | 3:17 |
| 7. | "Following" | Michael Steele | Different Light | 3:21 |
| 8. | "Hazy Shade of Winter" | Paul Simon | Less than Zero soundtrack, 1987 | 2:47 |
| 9. | "In Your Room" | Hoffs, Tom Kelly, Billy Steinberg | Everything, 1988 | 3:29 |
| 10. | "Eternal Flame" | Hoffs, Kelly, Steinberg | Everything | 3:56 |
| 11. | "Be with You" | Walker Igleheart, Debbi Peterson | Everything | 3:02 |
| 12. | "I'll Set You Free" (Single Mix) | Hoffs, Eric Lowen, Dan Navarro | Everything | 4:51 |
| 13. | "Everything I Wanted" | Hoffs, Lowen, Navarro | Previously unreleased | 3:37 |
| 14. | "Where Were You When I Needed You" | Steve Barri, P. F. Sloan | B-side of "Hero Takes a Fall" single, 1984 | 3:05 |

== Band members ==
=== The Bangles ===
- Susanna Hoffs – rhythm guitar, percussion, vocals
- Vicki Peterson – lead guitar, mandolin, electric sitar, vocals
- Michael Steele – bass guitar, acoustic guitar, vocals
- Debbi Peterson – drums, percussion, vocals

=== Additional musicians ===
- Rusty Anderson – additional guitars
- Barbara Chapman – harp, additional guitars
- Mitchell Froom, David Kahne – keyboards
- Darryl Citizen – "noise"
- Paulinho da Costa – percussion
- Bobby Donati, Vinnie Vincent – guitars
- Tommy Morgan – harmonica
- Jim Snodgrass – tabla
- David Lindley – guitars, bouzouki, saxophone, Dobro, multi-instruments
- Walker Igleheart, John Philip Shenale, David White – keyboards, programming

== Charts ==
=== Weekly charts ===
Weekly chart performance for Greatest Hits
| Chart (1990–1995) | Peak position |
|---|---|
| Australian Albums (ARIA) | 6 |
| Austrian Albums (Ö3 Austria) | 19 |
| Canada Top Albums/CDs (RPM) | 54 |
| Dutch Albums (Album Top 100) | 13 |
| European Albums (Music & Media) | 15 |
| Finnish Albums (Suomen virallinen lista) | 38 |
| German Albums (Offizielle Top 100) | 31 |
| New Zealand Albums (RMNZ) | 6 |
| Scottish Albums (Official Charts) | 46 |
| UK Albums (Official Charts) | 4 |
| US Billboard 200 | 97 |
| US Cash Box Top 200 Albums | 92 |

=== Year-end charts ===
Year-end chart performance for Greatest Hits
| Chart (1990) | Position |
|---|---|
| Australian Albums (ARIA) | 43 |
| Dutch Albums (Album Top 100) | 98 |
| European Albums (Music & Media) | 68 |
| UK Albums (OCC) | 46 |

== Certifications ==
Certifications for Greatest Hits
| Region | Certification | Certified units/sales |
|---|---|---|
| Australia (ARIA) | Platinum | 70,000^{^} |
| Netherlands (NVPI) | Gold | 50,000^{^} |
| New Zealand (RMNZ) | Gold | 7,500^{^} |
| Switzerland (IFPI Switzerland) | Gold | 25,000^{^} |
| United Kingdom (BPI) | Platinum | 300,000^{^} |
| United States (RIAA) | Platinum | 1,000,000^{^} |
^{^} Shipments figures based on certification alone.
