= Sweetheart of the Sun =

Studio album by the Bangles
- Released: September 27, 2011
- Recorded: June 2009 – June 2011
- Genre: Pop rock
- Length: 42:23
- Label: Model Music Group
- Producers: The Bangles; Matthew Sweet

The Bangles chronology
The Essential Bangles (2004)	Sweetheart of the Sun (2011)	Ladies and Gentlemen... The Bangles! (2014)

Sweetheart of the Sun is the fifth studio album by American pop rock band the Bangles, released on September 27, 2011. It is the band's second album since their 2003 reunion, and their only one that does not feature an official bassist, as Michael Steele left the band in 2005. The group hired several session musicians for bass guitar accompaniment for the album. The twelve-song album was co-produced by the Bangles and Matthew Sweet.

== Background ==
Sweetheart of the Sun is only the fifth full-length studio album by the Bangles since the band's inception thirty years earlier. It came eight years after their initial reunion album, Doll Revolution (2003). That record had been followed by an extensive concert tour after which bassist Michael Steele left the group, and a lengthy period of readjustment ensued. The remaining trio tried out new bassists and toured sporadically. Eventually they focused on making a new album on their own – the process would take about two years to complete.

Susanna Hoffs attributed the long process to parenting and family responsibilities. In an interview she said:

... all of us had kids, and we're working moms ... It was just that juggling the family stuff with the creative stuff took a while. When the Bangles started ... we were sort of married to each other. We were on the road; we were like gypsies. It was all Bangles all the time during the whole decade of the '80s, and we worked it. We were in our twenties and our main responsibility was showing up to the gig on time, so it's quite different now.

The album's name comes from the song "Anna Lee (Sweetheart of the Sun)", which was inspired by the book Girls Like Us (2009) by Sheila Weller. The triple biography tells the intertwined stories of the Laurel Canyon-based singer-songwriters Carole King, Joni Mitchell, and Carly Simon. The book had a deep impact on Hoffs, and she passed it along to Vicki and Debbi Peterson, who also loved it. The song conveys the influence these musicians had on the Bangles, both in their music and as role models of independent feminist women.

The song's opening lines – "Got a picture of you sittin', In the kitchen without a stitch on, Beautiful and natural as can be" – were inspired by a particular passage in the book. Hoffs explained:

There was a section in the book about Carole King talking about her writing partner Toni Stern, and there's a great picture of her sort of crouching down in the garden — I can't remember what she's doing, but she's completely naked in the picture with Toni Stern. It's really iconic, and sort of said it all about the Ladies of the Canyon. It was an interesting time, because they were feminists in a way — they were affected by the whole feminist movement — but they were also free spirits and very feminine. There was this vibe ... I don't want to say it was a "hippie-chick" vibe, but it was a unique time for women. We just decided to use those images and some of those stories that we got from the Sheila Weller book to kind of make this composite character that we ended up naming Anna Lee.

== Compositions ==
Of the album's twelve songs, ten are original compositions by some combination of the three band members (with occasional outside collaborators, including the former Go-Go's guitarist Charlotte Caffey); three songs are credited to the full trio itself. In addition to new material expressly written for the album, some of the songs were selected from a trove of unrecorded songs stretching back many years; a few date back as far as the early 1990s. The album's two cover songs date back even farther, to the 1960s: "Sweet and Tender Romance" is a reworking of a 1964 single by the UK girl group the McKinleys, itself a cover of the 1963 single by Carter-Lewis and the Southerners; while "Open My Eyes" comes from Todd Rundgren's early psychedelic band, the Nazz.

== Releases ==
The album was officially released on September 27, 2011. An expanded version of the album was released exclusively through Barnes & Noble stores and included acoustic versions of "Through Your Eyes" and "What a Life" as bonus tracks. Two singles, "I'll Never Be Through with You" and "Anna Lee (Sweetheart of the Sun)", were also released to help promote the record. An acoustic studio version of "Hazy Shade of Winter" and "Let It Go" were included on the 7-inch single of "Anna Lee (Sweetheart of the Sun)".

== Reception ==
Professional ratings
Aggregate scores
Source	Rating
Metacritic	69/100
Review scores
Source	Rating
AllMusic	3.5/5 stars
Blurt	9/10
Classic Pop	4/5 stars
Entertainment Weekly	B+
Goldmine	3/5 stars
Mojo	3/5 stars
Shindig!	4/5 stars
Slant Magazine	3/5 stars
Uncut	3/5 stars
USA Today	3/4 stars

Sweetheart of the Sun was seen by many critics as a successful reinvention of the Bangles' early musical style – "a beautifully sustained salute to 1960s-inspired pop". "With nods to the past but no wallowing in it," opined No Depression reviewer Julie Wenger Watson, the album "highlights their considerable skills as musicians, vocalists and songwriters." Writing in The New York Times, music critic Jon Caramanica remarked that much of the album feels "like mature takes on youthful ideas" and harkens back to the Bangles EP of 1982 and the band's earliest days. Similarly, Steve Pick of Blurt stated that "it sounds remarkably like what we might have expected a follow-up to All Over the Place to be".

Addressing the album purely on its own terms, Fresh Air's music critic Ken Tucker gave it a wholly favorable review, saying: "The greatest accomplishment of this new album is that it's never necessary to have heard a single Bangles song before right now to appreciate the craft and cleverness of the music they're making. Good pop-rock conquers all time and space."

== Track listing ==
No.	Title	Writer(s)	Lead vocals	Length
1.	"Anna Lee (Sweetheart of the Sun)"	Susanna Hoffs, Vicki Peterson, Debbi Peterson	Group, Hoffs	3:31
2.	"Under a Cloud"	Hoffs, Brian MacLeod, Dan Schwartz	Hoffs	4:07
3.	"Ball N Chain"	D. Peterson, Walker Igleheart	D. Peterson	3:51
4.	"I'll Never Be Through with You"	Hoffs, V. Peterson, Charlotte Caffey	Hoffs	3:40
5.	"Mesmerized"	Hoffs, V. Peterson, D. Peterson	D. Peterson, V. Peterson	3:46
6.	"Circles in the Sky"	V. Peterson	V. Peterson	4:04
7.	"Sweet and Tender Romance"	John Carter, Ken Lewis, Bill Bates	Hoffs, V. Peterson	2:11
8.	"Lay Yourself Down"	V. Peterson	V. Peterson	3:23
9.	"One of Two"	Hoffs, V. Peterson, D. Peterson	D. Peterson	3:39
10.	"What a Life"	V. Peterson, D. Peterson	V. Peterson	3:22
11.	"Through Your Eyes"	Hoffs, V. Peterson	Group, Hoffs	3:50
12.	"Open My Eyes"	Todd Rundgren	Group	3:00
Total length:				42:23

== Personnel ==
The band's musical credits are described in the album's liner notes:

The Bangles

- Susanna Hoffs – vocals, electric guitar, percussion
- Debbi Peterson – vocals, drums, percussion, acoustic guitar on "Ball N Chain" and "One of Two"
- Vicki Peterson – vocals, electric guitar, acoustic guitar on "Circles in the Sky", "Lay Yourself Down", "One of Two", and "What a Life", 12-string guitar on "Anna Lee", "Mesmerized", "What a Life", and "Through Your Eyes", slide guitar on "Ball N Chain", percussion

Additional musicians

- Derrick Anderson – bass guitar
- Matthew Sweet – bass guitar on "Through Your Eyes"
- Greg Leisz – mandolin, pedal steel guitar, lap steel guitar, electric guitar
- Greg Hilfman – piano, keyboards
- Jim Scott – keyboards
- John Cowsill – harmony vocals on "Circles in the Sky"

Production

- The Bangles – producer
- Matthew Sweet – producer

== Charts ==
Chart performance for Sweetheart of the Sun
Chart (2011)	Peak position
US Billboard 200	148
US Independent Albums (Billboard)	29
