= Ladies and Gentlemen... The Bangles! =

Compilation album by The Bangles
- Released: November 27, 2014
- Recorded: 1981–1984
- Genres: Pop, garage rock, new wave
- Length: 34:49
- Label: DownKiddie! Records
- Producers: The Bangles, Craig Leon (tracks 4–8)

The Bangles chronology
Sweetheart of the Sun (2011)	Ladies and Gentlemen... The Bangles! (2014)	Gold (2020)

Ladies and Gentlemen... The Bangles! is a compilation album of early material by The Bangles. It was released by the band on Thanksgiving Day, 2014.

The band personally compiled a selection of demos and released material they produced before their signing to Columbia Records in 1984. Released independently on the band's own Down Kiddie! label established in 1981, the album was initially made available as a download in digital MP3 format, with simple cover artwork depicting a cassette tape and text with the band's name readable as both "BANGS" and "BANGLES". It was eventually released in 2016 in physical formats by Omnivore Recordings on CD and LP, with subsequent black and colored vinyl repressings in 2021 and 2022.

The remastered material on the album spans the years 1981 to 1984. The compilation reissues "Getting Out of Hand" and "Call on Me," from the band's debut independent single (as The Bangs), recorded as a trio and released in the fall of 1981; as well as all five songs from the group's self-titled EP produced by Craig Leon and first released in June 1982 on the Faulty Products label. Both of those early releases were repressed in 1982 and 1983 respectively, are considered vinyl-only rarities and have long been out of print.

Four previously unreleased songs appear here from the Bangs' first demo cassette from July 1981, six months after they'd first come together as the Colours: Early versions of "The Real World" and "Call on Me," and covers of The Turtles song "Outside Chance" (co-written by Warren Zevon) and Paul Revere & The Raiders' "Steppin' Out." All were recorded in singer-guitarist Susanna Hoffs' Brentwood garage apartment.

“I feel a very special connection to our early recordings," Hoffs stated upon the album's release. "The garage of my parents’ house was our musical laboratory, and we took all the flavors of our favorite bands and mixed up a concoction of jangly guitars, McCartney-inspired bass parts, grooves powered by punk energy, and harmonies galore! These songs and recordings were our musical manifesto—all that mattered and inspired us, fueled by youthful energy, hope and blind ambition.”

Two unreleased live songs from 1984 are the only tracks to feature bassist-singer Michael Steele - a cover of Love's "7 and 7 Is", and the Bangles original "Tell Me," a song later rerecorded for their 1984 Columbia debut album All Over The Place.

Also included are three oddities the Bangs/Bangles recorded in 1982-83 (with original bassist Annette Zilinskas) that ended up on various-artists compilation albums - the surf instrumental "Bitchen Summer/Speedway" (first appearing on the Rodney On The ROQ Vol. III LP in 1982); "No Mag Commercial" (a radio spot promoting a local Los Angeles music magazine, it appeared on The Radio Tokyo Tapes in 1983); and the theme song for the syndicated radio program "Rock And Roll Alternative," hosted by George Gimarc and originating from KZEW in Dallas. The band allowed the latter track to appear on the CD accompanying Gimarc's 1997 book Post Punk Diary 1980 - 1982.

The title of the compilation is taken from Hoffs' spoken intro to "Bitchen Summer/Speedway," the opening track here, recorded especially for KROQ DJ Rodney Bingenheimer's 1983 compilation LP.

== Track listing ==
1. "Bitchen Summer/Speedway" (1982) (Susanna Hoffs/David Roback)
2. "Getting Out of Hand" (1981) (Vicki Peterson)
3. "Call on Me" (1981) (S. Hoffs/V. Peterson/D. Roback)
4. "The Real World" (1982) (S. Hoffs/V. Peterson)
5. I'm in Line (1982) (Debbi Peterson/V. Peterson/S. Hoffs)
6. "Want You" (1982) (V. Peterson)
7. "Mary Street" (1982) (S. Hoffs/V. Peterson)
8. "How is the Air Up There?" (1982) (S. Duboff/A. Kornfeld)
9. "Outside Chance" (unreleased demo, 1981) (Glenn Crocker/Warren Zevon)
10. "Steppin’ Out" (unreleased demo, 1981) (Mark Lindsay/Paul Revere)
11. "The Real World" (unreleased demo, 1981) (S. Hoffs/V. Peterson)
12. "Call on Me" (unreleased demo, 1981) (S. Hoffs/V. Peterson/D. Roback)
13. "Tell Me" (live performance at Dingwalls, London, 1984) (S. Hoffs/V. Peterson)
14. "7 & 7 Is" (live performance at The Palace, Hollywood, 1984) (Arthur Lee)
15. "No Mag Commercial" (1982) (S. Hoffs/V. Peterson)
16. "The Rock & Roll Alternative Program theme song" (1982) (D. Peterson/V. Peterson/S. Hoffs)

== Personnel ==
- Susanna Hoffs – rhythm guitar, vocals
- Debbi Peterson – drums, vocals
- Vicki Peterson – lead guitar, vocals
- Annette Zilinskas – bass guitar, harmonica, vocals
- Michael Steele – vocals, bass guitar on live tracks 13 & 14
