= Kahne =

Kahne is a surname. Notable people with the surname include:

- David Kahne, American record producer
- Kasey Kahne (born 1980), American racing driver
