= Elton Duck =

Elton Duck was an American power pop band from Los Angeles, California. They played southern Californian stages in the period 1976 – 1981, a time described by Bud Scoppa as when new wave and punk launched "countless bands that filled clubs from the beach towns to the San Fernando Valley with devoted fans and label A&R reps in search of the next big thing."

== History ==
The band was founded by Mike McFadden and Mike Condello, earlier friends in their native Phoenix area. The first lineup featured another Phoenix native, Dave Birkett, on bass. Afterwards, Andy Robinson, the former Horsefeathers drummer, stepped in after being introduced by Birkett, at that time a coworker at Studio Instrument Rentals. Robinson was invited for an audition, being welcomed to the band almost immediately afterwards. After a short period with this line-up, Birkett decided to quit the band to focus more on life outside music. He was subsequently replaced by Michael Steele, former Runaways and later Bangles bass player. The final and official lineup was Mike McFadden (lead guitar and vocals), Mike Condello (rhythm guitar and vocals), Andy Robinson (drums, dulcimer and vocals) and Michael Steele (bass and background vocals). The original name came from their musician friend Ed Black, inspired by McFadden's nickname Duck and also because at that time McFadden, balding and wearing glasses, in his solo performing was reminiscent of Elton John. The group performed live in important Los Angeles rock clubs and cafés such as Doug Weston's Troubadour, Madame Wong's, Club 88, Hong Kong Café and others.

In 1980 after a deal with Arista Records by the veteran A&R executive Bud Scoppa, the band recorded a twelve-track album at Rumbo Studios, the songs mostly written by McFadden, except Robinson's song "Flame" and Bill Spooners' "Only a few Days". The track list also featured "She Won't Answer the Phone", "Runaways", and "Ordinary Guy", all recorded with the help of Earle Mankey. The band name "Elton Duck" was not well received by Arista, so the band joined the label under the less distinctive name The Decoys. Before the album could be released, however, Arista head Clive Davis decided to shelve it. His reasons are unknown, although Bud Scoppa speculates that his apparent change of heart "may have been motivated by the fresh commercial failures of albums by similarly poppy L.A. faves (and Arista labelmates) The Pop and The BusBoys." The band continued playing live gigs after this disappointment with another bassist, but had broken up by 1981.

== Legacy ==
After its initial shelving, Elton Duck was a difficult album to obtain, yet quietly celebrated as an overlooked power pop classic by musicians such as Robbie Rist. In 2012, the album was officially issued for the first time after over thirty years, for a non-commercial use to benefit the Mike Condello Music Scholarship Fund. In this crowd-funded reissue it contained remastered sound, liner notes from journalist Bud Scoppa and all three surviving band members (Condello committed suicide in 1995), and the bonus tracks "Xmas" (a 1979 single) and a cover of The Tubes' 1975 song "White Punks on Dope". Initial copies came autographed by McFadden, Robinson, and Steele. The band's music served as something of a bridge between 1970s new wave and 1980s alternative music, with chiming 12-string guitars, ironic lyrics and a melodic sound. The album was well received upon its release, with Popshifter's Cait Brennan declaring the album to be "a great time capsule of inventive, melodic, muscular rock, with an epic sense of drama and great vocal performances […] a record full of powerful, affecting tunes and amazing performances from four very talented musicians." As of 2013 the album is out of print.

== Discography ==
1. Xmas (12" single) (1979)
2. Elton Duck (1980 / released in 2012)
