= Hong Kong Café =

Music venue in Los Angeles, California

Coordinates: 34°3′55″N 118°14′13″W

- The Hong Kong
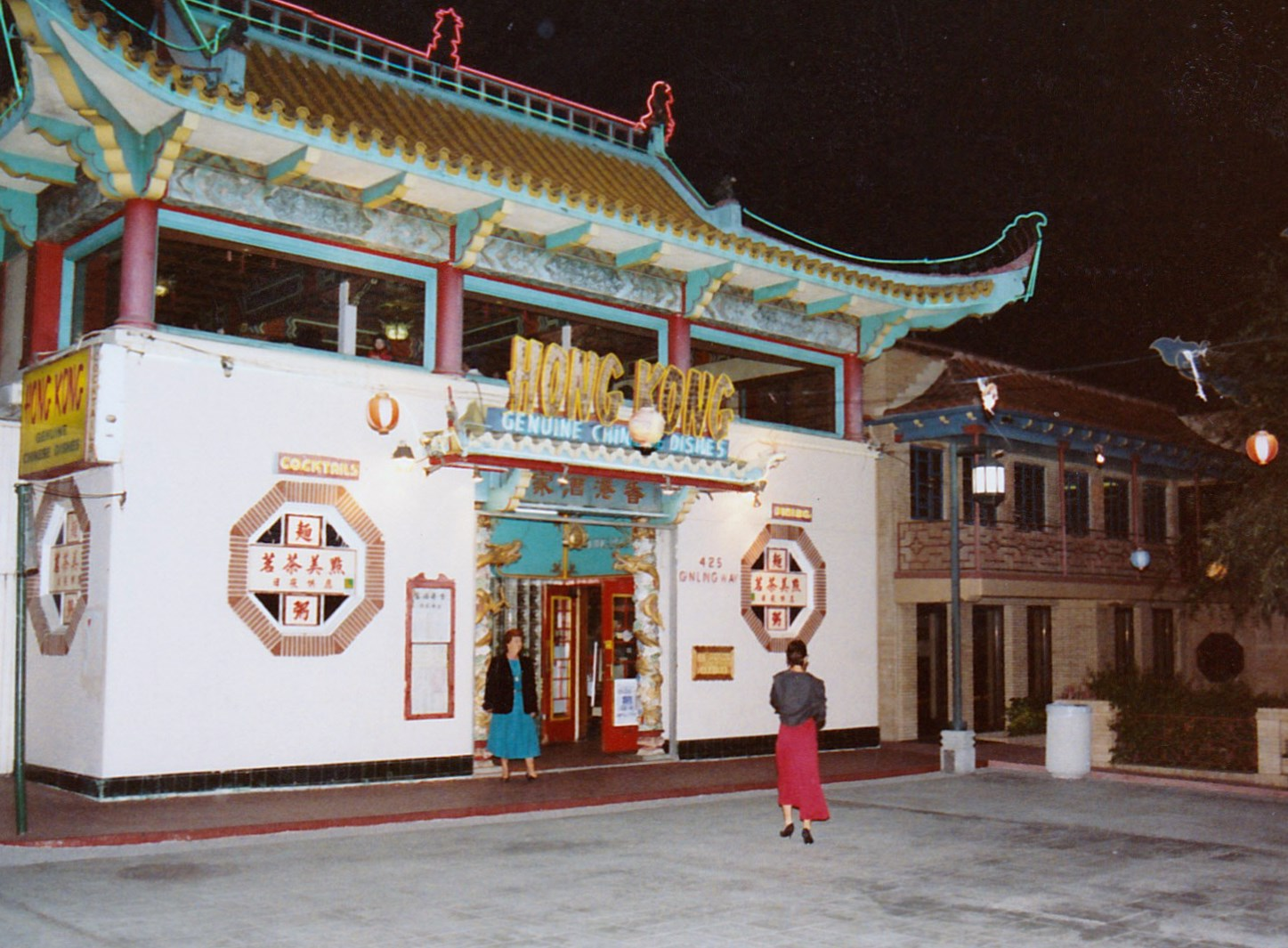
- Interactive map of Hong Kong Café
- Address: 425 Gin Ling Way
- Location: Chinatown, Los Angeles, California
- Events: Punk rock; hardcore punk

Construction
- Opened: For Music, June 5, 1979
- Closed: January, 1981

The Hong Kong Café was a Los Angeles restaurant and music venue that was a part of the Los Angeles punk rock scene during the late 1970s and early 1980s when the club was owned and operated by Barry Seidel, Kim Turner and Suzy Frank.

Located at 425 Gin Ling Way in the Chinatown district of Downtown Los Angeles, California and across the way from sometimes rival Esther Wong's Madame Wong's, the former Chinese restaurant was open to audiences of all ages.

It can briefly be seen in the 1974 movie, Chinatown.

== History ==
=== First run of shows: 1979-1981 ===
The Plugz and UXA played at the club's opening night on June 7, 1979, and numerous bands, including X, Catholic Discipline, The Mau Maus, Bags, The Smart Pills, Nervous Gender, and The Alley Cats, performed there until its closing in January 1981. Concert footage filmed at Hong Kong Café appears in the Penelope Spheeris documentary film The Decline of Western Civilization.

The Hong Kong Cafe was typically more open to punk and hardcore acts than Madame Wong's. Black Flag played some of its first few shows at the Hong Kong Cafe.

== Aftermath ==
The space is currently occupied by Realm, a housewares and gifts retailer.

== Shows at the Hong Kong Café ==
Shows from the Hong Kong's first months:

Date	Band	Band	Band	Band	Band Also appearing were Phil Seymour, the Textones, and Moon Martin.
June 5, 1979	Daily Planet	Elton Duck			
June 6, 1979	Uncle	Jammer			
June 7, 1979	The Plugz	U.X.A.			
June 8, 1979	The Alley Cats	Bags			
June 9, 1979	Snapp	Blow-Up			
June 10, 1979	Ryno	Curtis Bros.			
June 18, 1979	Black Flag	The Last			
June 22, 1979	The Controllers	Fear	The Plugz	X	Black Flag
June 29, 1979	The Controllers	Fear	The Plugz	X	Black Flag
July 1, 1979	The Dogs	The Tremors			
July 2, 1979	Copter	Big Wow			
July 3, 1979	Gorilla	Fingers			
July 4, 1979	The Flyboys	Fear	Satin Tones		
July 5, 1979	The Weasels	The Silencers			
July 6, 1979	Pink Section	The Units	The B-People		
July 7, 1979	The Pink Section				
July 8, 1979	The Plugz	The Tellers			
July 9, 1979	Roy Loney & the Phantom Movers	The Real Kids			
July 10, 1979	The Shieks of Shake	The Blitz Bros.			
July 11, 1979	The Alley Cats	The Eyes	Human Hands		
July 12, 1979	X	Unknown	Unknown		
July 13, 1979	Unknown				
July 14, 1979	Unknown				
July 15, 1979	Bags	Controllers	The B-People		
July 16, 1979	Yankee Rose	Shandi Cinnamon			
July 17, 1979	Germs	Adaptors	Extremes		
July 18, 1979	The Real Kids				
July 19, 1979	Bates Motel	Hero	Johanna Went		
July 20, 1979	The Plugz	Go-Go's			
July 21, 1979	The Alley Cats	Penetrators			
July 22, 1979	Elton Duck	Daily Planet	Dianna Harris	The Tufftones	
July 23, 1979	The Most	Keller and Webb			
July 24, 1979	Suburban Lawns	The Eyes	The Brainiacs		
July 25, 1979	The Weirz	U.S. Rock			
July 26, 1979	Middle Class	U.X.A.	Agent Orange		
July 27, 1979	Bates Motel	The Meckanics			
July 28, 1979	Bags	Nervous Gender			
July 29, 1979	Ivy and the Eaters	Big Wow			
July 30, 1979	Ivy and the Eaters	Big Wow			
July 31, 1979	Axis	The Real Kids			
August 1, 1979	Fear	Shandi	Johanna Went		
August 2, 1979	D.O.A.	Pointed Sticks			
August 3, 1979	D.O.A.	Pointed Sticks			
August 4, 1979	X	Eddie and the Subtitles			
August 5, 1979	Reddi Killawatt	Prankster			
August 6, 1979	Suburban Lawns	Rotters	Spy		
August 7, 1979	Simpletones	the Crowd	Stepmothers		
August 8, 1979	U.X.A.	Flyboys	Silencers		
August 9, 1979	Zero's (S.F.)	Urge			
August 10, 1979	Zero's (S.F.)	Urge			
August 11, 1979	Nervous Gender	Human Hands			
August 12, 1979	The Plugz				
August 13, 1979	Bates Motel				
August 15, 1979	Germs	The B-People	VS.		
October 22, 1979	210 IQ				
