= Everything I Wanted (The Bangles song) =

1990 single by the Bangles

Single by the Bangles

from the album Greatest Hits
- Released: May 1990
- Length: 3:37
- Label: Columbia
- Songwriters: Susanna Hoffs, Eric Lowen, Dan Navarro
- Producer: Davitt Sigerson

The Bangles singles chronology
| "I'll Set You Free" (1989) | "Everything I Wanted" (1990) | "Walk Like an Egyptian" (remix) (1990) |

Alternative cover
- Australian cover

"Everything I Wanted" is a song by American band the Bangles. With lead vocals by Susanna Hoffs, the song was recorded for the band's 1988 album, Everything, but it did not make the final track listing. It was co-written by Susanna Hoffs with Eric Lowen and Dan Navarro of Lowen & Navarro and features a barbershop quartet-style a capella bridge.

The Bangles broke up in late 1989, and a Greatest Hits album was released in 1990 to fulfill the band's contractual obligations with Columbia Records. Everything I Wanted was added to the release, where it was its sole new recording, and was released as a single to promote the album in continental Europe and Australia. A new "Walk Like an Egyptian" remix was released in the UK instead.

With the band no longer operative, the single relied solely on radio play and its music video for promotion. It performed poorly on the charts, only charting in the Netherlands at number 41 in July 1990. This would be the band's last official single for 13 years.

== Music video ==
A music video for the song was created, which consisted of an amalgamation of different shots from the band's earlier videos for Columbia Records.

== Charts ==
| Chart (1990) | Peak position |
|---|---|
| Netherlands (Single Top 100) | 41 |
