= Doll Revolution =

Studio album by The Bangles
- Released: September 9, 2003
- Recorded: June 2000 – June 2003
- Genre: Pop rock
- Length: 60:22
- Label: Koch
- Producers: Brad Wood; The Bangles

The Bangles chronology
Greatest Hits (1990)	Doll Revolution (2003)	The Essential Bangles (2004)

Doll Revolution is the fourth studio album by American pop rock band The Bangles. It was released in March 2003 in Europe and Japan, and in September of that year in the United States. It is the first album by the group since their 1998 reunion. It is also the final Bangles album to feature bassist and vocalist Michael Steele, who left the band in January 2004, during the promotional tour and was subsequently, 12 years later, replaced by Annette Zilinskas, the group's original bassist whom Steele had replaced.

== Background ==
Professional ratings
Review scores
Source	Rating
AllMusic	3/5 stars
Blender	3/5 stars
Entertainment Weekly	B−
The Guardian	3/5 stars
Mojo	4/5 stars
Q	3/5 stars
The Rolling Stone Album Guide	2.5/5 stars
Spin	B
The Times	4/5 stars
Uncut	3/5 stars

The Bangles initially disbanded in 1989 following the disappointing sales of their album Everything. They reunited in 1998 and released the song "Get the Girl" on the Austin Powers: The Spy Who Shagged Me soundtrack, the success of which enabled them to return to touring for the next four years to finance their next record. The group self-released Doll Revolution through their independent label Down Kiddie Records, which had been largely defunct after releasing their debut single "Getting Out of Hand" in 1981.

Doll Revolution was first released on CD in Europe and Japan in March 2003, and distributed through deals with the EMI subsidiary Liberty Records and Victor. The record came out in the US in September of that year, on Koch Records. It was also released on cassette in Thailand and Indonesia, and on CD in the UK, Australia, South Africa and Taiwan.

Doll Revolution contains 15 songs and is the group's lengthiest album. All tracks were composed or co-written by members of the Bangles, with the exception of "Tear Off Your Own Head (It's a Doll Revolution)", written by Elvis Costello and debuting on his 2002 album When I Was Cruel. Previous versions of some of the songs were released and performed by band members with other groups they worked with: "Mixed Messages" by Vicki Peterson and "The Rain Song", written by Vicki and Susan Cowsill, both appeared on Continental Drifters albums; while "Ask Me No Questions," written by Debbi Peterson, was released by her band Kindred Spirit. "Nickel Romeo" and "Between the Two", while never released, had been debuted by Michael Steele with her band, Crash Wisdom, in live shows starting in 1994.

The album spawned three singles. The lead single, "Something That You Said", reached No. 38 in the UK, and was a minor hit elsewhere in Europe. "Tear Off Your Own Head (It's a Doll Revolution)" and "I Will Take Care of You" were next released as singles, the latter reaching No. 79 in the UK. All three songs had lead vocals by Susanna Hoffs.

In the US, a bonus DVD was included with one version of the album, containing interviews, a photo gallery and the "Something That You Said" video. The Japanese CD in 2003 included as bonus tracks both songs from the Bangs'/Bangles' 1981 debut 7-inch single, "Getting Out of Hand" and "Call on Me" (the first time they had been released on CD), as well as an alternate mix of "Something That You Said". All of these tracks are featured on the audio player on the US bonus DVD as well.

In 2020 and 2021, the album was reissued in a 2-LP format in the US on four different colored vinyl editions by Real Gone Music.

== Track listing ==
No.	Title	Writer(s)	Lead vocals	Length
1.	"Tear Off Your Own Head (It's a Doll Revolution)"	Elvis Costello	Hoffs	3:57
2.	"Stealing Rosemary"	Susanna Hoffs, Debbi Peterson, Vicki Peterson	V. Peterson	3:32
3.	"Something That You Said"	Charlotte Caffey, Hoffs, V. Peterson	Hoffs	4:16
4.	"Ask Me No Questions"	Walker Igleheart, D. Peterson	D. Peterson	3:26
5.	"The Rain Song"	Susan Cowsill, V. Peterson	V. Peterson	3:41
6.	"Nickel Romeo"	Steve LeGassick, Brian Ray, Michael Steele	Steele	4:57
7.	"Ride the Ride"	Hoffs, D. Peterson, V. Peterson, Daniel Schwartz	Group	4:48
8.	"I Will Take Care of You"	Hoffs, Dillon O'Brian	Hoffs	3:56
9.	"Here Right Now"	D. Peterson, Peter Rafelson	D. Peterson	3:24
10.	"Single by Choice"	V. Peterson	V. Peterson	3:41
11.	"Lost at Sea"	Hoffs, D. Peterson	D. Peterson	3:55
12.	"Song for a Good Son"	Steele	Steele	4:01
13.	"Mixed Messages"	V. Peterson	V. Peterson	3:19
14.	"Between the Two"	Steele, David White	Steele	3:42
15.	"Grateful"	Bill Bottrell, Hoffs, Daniel Schwartz	Hoffs	4:59

== Personnel ==
=== The Bangles ===
- Susanna Hoffs – acoustic guitar, electric guitar, vocals
- Debbi Peterson – drums, acoustic guitar, percussion, vocals
- Vicki Peterson – guitar, acoustic guitar, electric guitar, mandolin, vocals
- Michael Steele – bass, acoustic guitar, electric guitar, vocals

=== Additional musicians ===
- Dillon O'Brian – acoustic & electric guitars, Wurlitzer electric piano
- Bangle Boys Choir (Dave Grohl, John Crooke & Chick Wolverton) – background vocals
- Greg Hilfman & Chick Wolverton – keyboards
- Greg Leisz – lap & pedal steel
- Peter Holsapple – mandolin, accordion & keyboards
- Tim Russell – acoustic guitar and background vocals on "Here Right Now"
- R. Walt Vincent – harmonium
- David Campbell – strings arranger on "I Will Take Care of You"
- Leah Katz – viola on "I Will Take Care of You"
- Melissa Reiner & Michael Nicholson – violin on "I Will Take Care of You"
- Guenevere Measham – cello on "I Will Take Care of You"

=== Production ===
- Brad Wood – production
- The Bangles – production

== Charts ==
Chart performance for Doll Revolution
Chart (2003)	Peak position
Austrian Albums (Ö3 Austria)	36
European Albums (Music & Media)	97
German Albums (Offizielle Top 100)	35
Scottish Albums (Official Charts)	78
Swiss Albums (Schweizer Hitparade)	80
UK Albums (Official Charts)	62
US Independent Albums (Billboard)	23
