= A Hazy Shade of Winter =

1966 single by Simon & Garfunkel

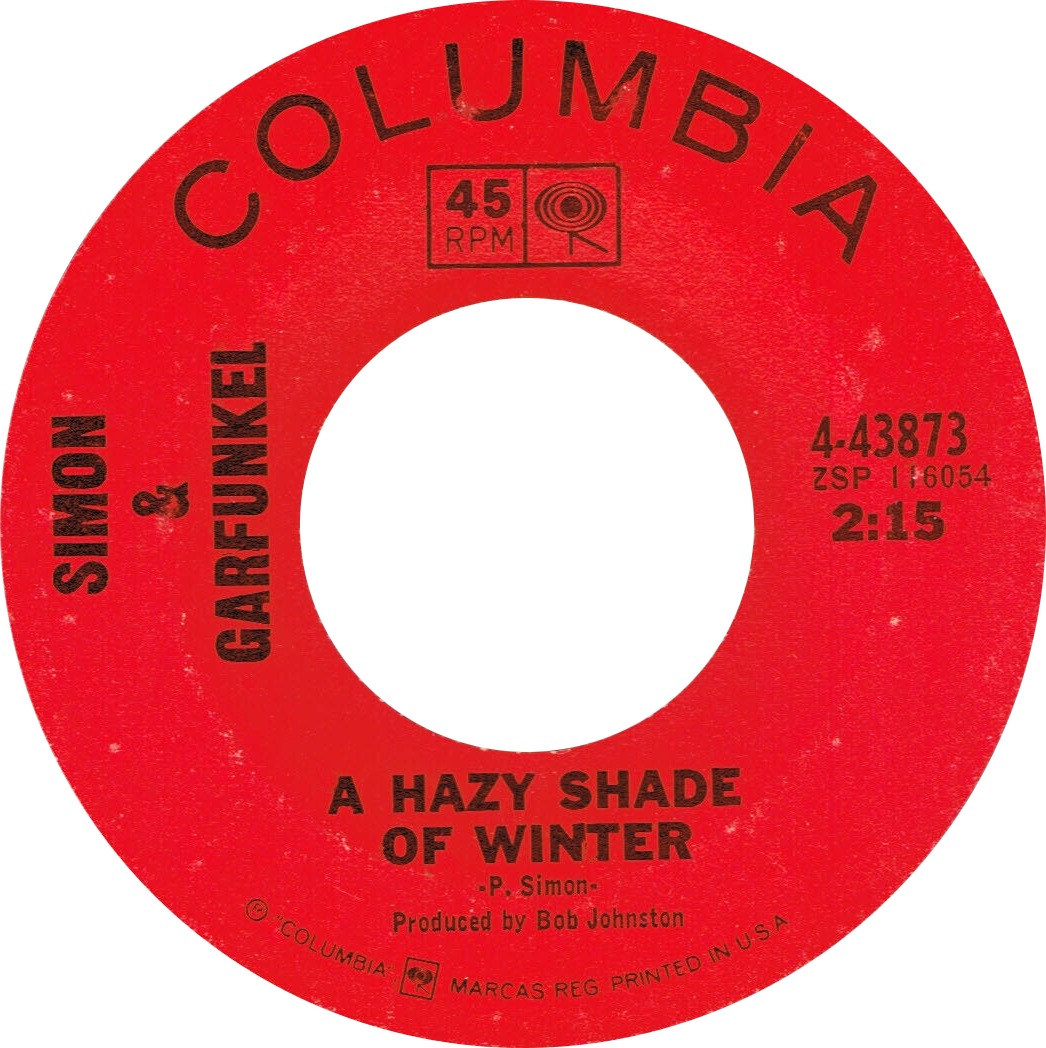
- Side-A label of the US vinyl single

Single by Simon & Garfunkel
- B-side: "For Emily, Whenever I May Find Her"
- Released: October 22, 1966
- Recorded: September 7, 1966
- Studio: Columbia 52nd Street (New York City)
- Genre: Folk rock
- Length: 2:17
- Label: Columbia
- Songwriter: Paul Simon
- Producer: Bob Johnston

Simon & Garfunkel singles chronology
"The Dangling Conversation" (1966)	"A Hazy Shade of Winter" (1966)	"At the Zoo" (1967)

Audio
- "A Hazy Shade of Winter" by Simon & Garfunkel on YouTube

"A Hazy Shade of Winter" is a song by American musician Paul Simon, recorded by American music duo Simon & Garfunkel, released on October 22, 1966, initially as a stand-alone single, but subsequently included on the duo's album Bookends (1968). It peaked at number 13 on the Billboard Hot 100.

In 1987, the Bangles recorded a cover version for the soundtrack of the film Less Than Zero, which peaked at number 2 on the Billboard Hot 100. In 2019, Gerard Way and Ray Toro recorded a cover version for the series The Umbrella Academy.

== Background ==
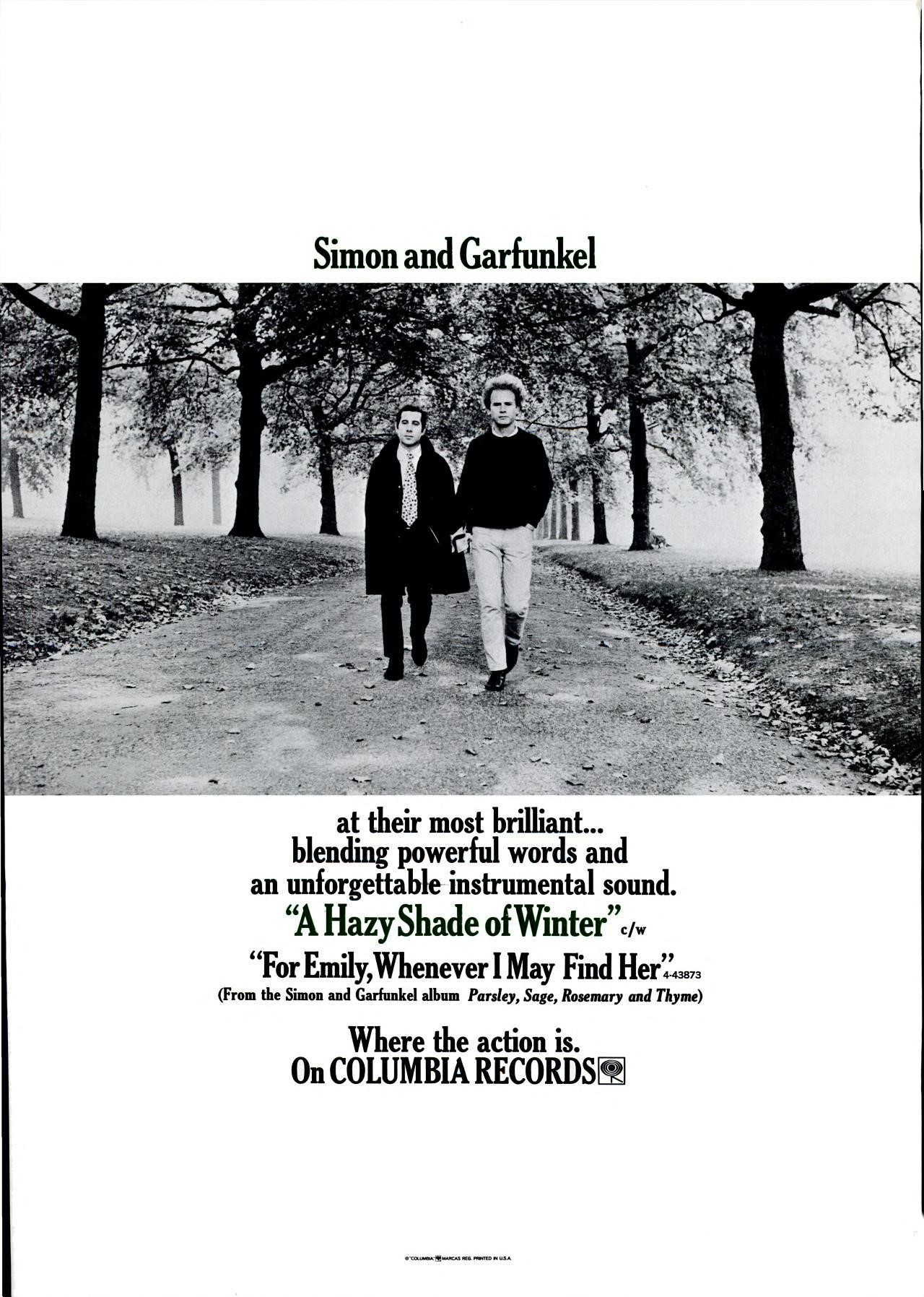
Billboard advertisement, 29 October 1966

The duo recorded "A Hazy Shade of Winter" during the sessions for Parsley, Sage, Rosemary and Thyme (1966), but the song was not included on an album until 1968's Bookends.

== Composition ==
"A Hazy Shade of Winter" follows a rock-tinged sound, with a fairly straightforward verse-refrain structure. The song dates back to Simon's days in England in 1965. The lyrics follows a hopeless poet with "manuscripts of unpublished rhyme", and unsure of his achievements in life.

The lyrics recall the transition from fall to winter, as suggested by the repetition of the final chorus of the song:

I look around,
leaves are brown
And the sky
is a hazy shade of winter

Look around,
leaves are brown
There's a patch of snow on the ground.

Author and disc jockey Pete Fornatale considered the lyrics evocative of, and standing in contrast with, those of John Phillips' "California Dreamin'".

== Reception ==
Billboard described the song as a "winning number" and a "change of tempo for the duo [which] could make this their biggest to date". Cash Box wrote that it is a "strong session bound for biggiesburg". Record World wrote that it "put[s] poetry in rock motion". Decades later, AllMusic critic Richie Unterberger described the song as "one of [Simon and Garfunkel's] best songs, and certainly one of the toughest and more rock-oriented."

== Chart history ==
=== Weekly charts ===
Chart (1966–67)	Peak position
Canada RPM Top Singles	11
New Zealand (Listener)	14
US Billboard Hot 100	13
US Cash Box Top 100	17

Chart (1991)	Peak position
UK Singles Chart	30

== The Bangles version ==
"Hazy Shade of Winter"

Single by the Bangles

from the album Less than Zero
- Released: November 1987
- Genre: Hard rock; pop rock
- Length: 2:46 (radio edit); 4:59 (12" version)
- Label: Def Jam Recordings
- Songwriter: Paul Simon
- Producer: Rick Rubin

The Bangles singles chronology
"Following" (1987)	"Hazy Shade of Winter" (1987)	"In Your Room" (1988)

Music video
- "Hazy Shade of Winter" on YouTube
- "Hazy Shade of Winter" (audio) on YouTube

In 1987, the Bangles were approached to record a song for the soundtrack of the film Less than Zero. They recorded a cover of "A Hazy Shade of Winter" as "Hazy Shade of Winter" in a hard rock style, which they had been performing live as early as 1982.

Susanna Hoffs explained:

I’m listening to K-EARTH 101, an oldies station. I’m alone in this dark room and all I had was the radio. “Hazy Shade of Winter” came on one day. I thought I was a Simon & Garfunkel aficionado but I, somehow, had missed that badass folk-rock song of theirs. I ran to our band rehearsal that night and was like, “We have to cover this song".

Their cover was a harder-edged rock song that removed one of the two verses of the bridge section. The record, like the rest of the soundtrack album, was produced by Rick Rubin. After a fruitful but disappointing experience with producer David Kahne for their album Different Light during which they had little say on production, the group's greater involvement in recording led to an additional producer credit for the band. Michael Steele later said that "we sounded the most on this record the way we actually sound live".

Lead vocals were performed jointly by all four members of the group, with a short solo led by Susanna Hoffs toward the end. This was a rare occurrence in Bangles songs as they mostly had just one member singing lead. Due to pressure from their record label, the Bangles removed the verse from the original song that contained the line "drinking my vodka and lime". According to liner notes on the soundtrack album, Steve Bartek from the band Oingo Boingo played acoustic guitar on the track.

When released as a single in November 1987, "Hazy Shade of Winter" became a huge hit, surpassing the popularity of the original version, peaking at number 2 on the Billboard Hot 100 and number 11 in the UK. It was also a hit around Europe.

The music video (the first for future country music video director Jim Shea) showed the group singing in a studio surrounded by television screens on the walls, similar to a scene from the film Less Than Zero, from which other scenes appear throughout the video.

"Hazy Shade of Winter" was not included on any of the group's studio albums, but later appeared on their first official Greatest Hits in 1990 and on many of their compilations. The accompanying video compilation for Greatest Hits did not include the promo for "Hazy Shade of Winter" due to complications with the licensing of the movie rights of the scenes from Less Than Zero that appear within the video clip. The video was also not included on any home media releases of the film itself, either.

The song appears during season 1, episode 2 of the Netflix series Stranger Things, season 1, episode 10 of the Netflix series The Umbrella Academy, episode 9 of The Assassination of Gianni Versace: American Crime Story, season 6, episode 9 of the Netflix series Lucifer; season 1, episode 1 of (as well as promotional trailers for) the Amazon Prime Video series Paper Girls. Season 1, episode 6 of the Amazon Prime Video series Gen V features a cover version of this cover version, performed by The Beautiful Distortion.

=== Chart history ===
==== Weekly charts ====
Chart (1987–1988)	Peak position
Australia (Kent Music Report)	7
Belgium (Ultratop 50 Flanders)	17
Canada Top Singles (RPM)	3
Europe (European Hot 100 Singles)	29
Finland (Suomen virallinen singlelista)	21
Germany (GfK)	52
Ireland (IRMA)	8
Luxembourg (Radio Luxembourg)	7
Netherlands (Single Top 100)	14
New Zealand (Recorded Music NZ)	12
Quebec (ADISQ)	21
UK Singles (Official Charts)	11
US Billboard Hot 100	2
US Billboard Hot Dance Music/Maxi-Singles Sales	37
US Cash Box Top 100	3

==== Year-end charts ====
Chart (1988)	Position
Australia (ARIA)	47
Canada Top Singles (RPM)	40
United States (Billboard)	35

== Gerard Way version ==
"Hazy Shade of Winter"

Single by Gerard Way featuring Ray Toro
- Released: January 24, 2019
- Length: 3:17
- Label: Reprise
- Songwriter: Paul Simon
- Producer: Doug McKean

Gerard Way singles chronology
"Dasher" (2018)	"Hazy Shade of Winter" (2019)	"Happy Together" (2019)

Ray Toro singles chronology
"Hope for the World" (2016)	"Hazy Shade of Winter" (2019)	"Happy Together" (2019)

Audio
- "Hazy Shade of Winter" on YouTube

Gerard Way released a version of "Hazy Shade of Winter" in January 2019 for the Netflix series The Umbrella Academy. The track is based on The Bangles' cover, and features fellow My Chemical Romance member Ray Toro on guitar and bass as well as Jarrod Alexander on drums.

=== Credits ===
Credits adapted from Tidal.

- Gerard Way – main artist
- Ray Toro – guitar, bass
- Doug McKean – production, record engineering, mixing
- Jarrod Alexander – drums
- Jamie Muhoberac – keyboards
- Ted Jensen – mastering

=== Charts ===
Chart (2019)	Peak position
Scottish Singles Sales (Official Charts)	76

== Sources ==
- Bennighof, James (2007). The Words and Music of Paul Simon. Greenwood Publishing Group. ISBN 978-0-275-99163-0.
- Browne, David (2012). Fire and Rain: The Beatles, Simon and Garfunkel, James Taylor, CSNY, and the Lost Story Of 1970. Da Capo Press. ISBN 978-0-306-82072-4.
- Charlesworth, Chris (1997). "Bridge Over Troubled Water". The Complete Guide to the Music of Paul Simon and Simon & Garfunkel. Omnibus Press. ISBN 978-0-7119-5597-4.
- Ebel, Roswitha (2004). Paul Simon: seine Musik, sein Leben [Paul Simon: His Music, His Life] (in German). epubli. ISBN 978-3-937729-00-8.
- Eliot, Marc (2010). Paul Simon: A Life. John Wiley and Sons. ISBN 978-0-470-43363-8.
- Fornatale, Pete (2007). Simon and Garfunkel's Bookends. Rodale. ISBN 978-1-59486-427-8.
- Humphries, Patrick (1982). Bookends: The Simon and Garfunkel story. Proteus Books. ISBN 978-0-86276-063-2.
- Kingston, Victoria (2000). Simon & Garfunkel: The Biography. Fromm International. ISBN 978-0-88064-246-0.
