= In Your Room (The Bangles song) =

Single by The Bangles

from the album Everything
- B-side: "Bell Jar"
- Released: October 1988
- Recorded: 1988
- Genre: Pop rock; psychedelic rock
- Length: 3:27
- Label: Columbia Records
- Songwriters: Susanna Hoffs; Tom Kelly; Billy Steinberg
- Producer: Davitt Sigerson

The Bangles singles chronology
"Hazy Shade of Winter" (1987)	"In Your Room" (1988)	"Eternal Flame" (1989)

Music video
- "In Your Room" on YouTube

"In Your Room" is a 1988 song by American rock group The Bangles, written by Susanna Hoffs in collaboration with Billy Steinberg and composer Tom Kelly. The song was released as the first single from the band's third album, Everything. It reached the top five of the US singles chart, and also charted in Australia, New Zealand, and the United Kingdom.

== Background ==
"In Your Room" was written around the same time as "Eternal Flame," according to Billy Steinberg. "Right from the get go The Bangles were a retro '60s kind of band. They loved '60s music, obscure groups like The Merry-Go-Round," Steinberg told Songfacts. "The Bangles liked everything from Petula Clark to The Beatles ... So when we got together to write with Susanna it was right up our alley because of course Tom and I grew up in the '60s and that was what we loved. [W]e had that in common with Susanna." He added that the song's style was somewhat similar to "Mony Mony," the 1968 hit single by Tommy James and the Shondells.

== Release and reception ==
Released in October 1988, "In Your Room" entered the Billboard Hot 100 the following month and peaked at number five in January. It reached number four on the Singles Sales chart, number nine on the Hot 100 Airplay chart, and number five on the Modern Rock chart. The song also peaked at number 11 in New Zealand, number 41 in Australia, and number 35 in the United Kingdom.

Matthew Greenwald's retrospective review for AllMusic praised the band's rhythm section (Debbi Peterson and Michael Steele) for the song's dynamics in the chorus and bridge sections, as well as Vicki Peterson's "simulated sitar riffs." He also noted that "Lyrically, the song is a perfect vehicle for lead singer Susanna Hoffs' kittenish sexuality." Rolling Stone writer Jim Freek said "In Your Room" was perhaps the band's best song to be released after their debut album.

== Charts ==
=== Weekly charts ===
Chart (1988–1989)	Peak position
Australian ARIA Singles Chart	41
Canada Top Singles RPM	8
European Airplay (European Hit Radio)	15
Irish Singles Chart	25
Italy Airplay (Music & Media)	8
New Zealand RIANZ Singles Chart	11
Quebec (ADISQ)	9
UK Singles Chart	35
US Billboard Hot 100	5
US Cash Box Top 100	10
US Modern Rock Tracks	5

=== Year-end charts ===
Chart (1989)	Position
United States (Billboard)	66
