= Bangles (EP) =

EP by the Bangles
- Released: June 1982
- Recorded: 1982
- Genre: Rock; pop
- Length: 13:20
- Label: Faulty Products; I.R.S.
- Producer: Craig Leon

The Bangles chronology
Bangles (1982)	All Over the Place (1984)

Bangles is the first EP by American pop rock band the Bangles. It was released in 1982 by Faulty Products and reissued in 1983 by I.R.S. Records when Faulty Products went out of business. The songs remained widely unavailable thereafter, with only occasional rereleases of individual songs. The whole five-song EP was eventually reissued as part of the Bangles' 2014 compilation, Ladies and Gentlemen... The Bangles!.

This would be the group's only release to feature original bassist Annette Zilinskas, who left in early 1983 and was replaced by Michael Steele, and did not record with them again until the 2018 multigroup album 3 × 4.

A three-song CD3 mini single version of the EP was released on A&M/I.R.S. Records in 1988.

== Background ==
The Bangles began in Los Angeles as a garage rock band called the Bangs, popularly associated with similar bands from the area in the Paisley Underground music scene. After self-releasing a well-received debut single, "Getting Out of Hand" (1981), the group was signed by music industry executive Miles Copeland to his new record label Faulty Products, an independent US-based subsidiary of I.R.S. Records. The band quickly recorded a five-song mini-album which was released in June 1982.

== Composition and recording ==
The EP includes four original songs penned by band members, as well as "How Is the Air Up There?", a cover version of the 1966 single by New Zealand band the La De Da's (which is itself a rendition of the Changin' Times' 1965 single). Vocals are credited to Vicki and Debbi Peterson and Susanna Hoffs on every track. Vicki sings the lead vocal on "Want You" and "How Is the Air Up There?" while Debbi sings "I'm in Line"; Hoffs sings "The Real World", and she and Vicki share the lead on "Mary Street". Annette Zilinskas provides backing vocals on "Want You".

Music industry veteran Craig Leon served as the record producer. Leon was already well known in rock and indie circles for his production work with the Ramones and Blondie. Leon also played piano on "Mary Street" and "The Real World", and the latter song includes additional piano work by Ethan James. The album cover art was designed by Ewa Wojciak with photography by Bob Seidemann.

Shortly after the EP's release, Zilinskas left the band and was replaced by former Runaways bassist Michael Steele.

== Musical style ==
The Bangles' early years were informed by a 1960s garage rock sensibility, and the 1982 EP maintains a stylistic link between the "Getting Out of Hand" debut single and the band's first full-length album, the critically acclaimed All Over the Place (1984). Music critics often note the irony of their subsequent rise from guitar-based rock devotees to "one of the most successful chart groups of the '80s with their slickly produced synth pop". In his book Music: What Happened?, Scott Miller names "The Real World" as one of the top songs of the 1980s, and remarks of the EP: "Those who know only 'Eternal Flame' might be amazed at how inventive and together they were in their relative infancy". The Bangles themselves consider the early material, lesser-known though it was, to be vital to their own story: as Hoffs told Billboard in 2014, "I think it's as representative of who we really are and as authentic as anything the Bangles have ever done. There's a kind of architecture to those songs – three-part harmonies, guitar-driven, jangly over a kind of garage rock rhythm is who we are now, still, as much as we were back then."

== Release ==
Professional ratings
Review scores
Source	Rating
AllMusic	4.5/5 stars
Christgau's Record Guide	B
Rolling Stone	3/5 stars

The original EP was released on vinyl in June 1982 by Faulty Products (catalog #FEP 1302), after a delay due to the change of the band's name from the Bangs to the Bangles and consequent retouching of the cover art. The label folded soon after and Copeland's major label, I.R.S. Records, re-released it in 1983 (catalog #SP-70506).

In 1988, A&M/I.R.S. Records released a three-song CD3 mini single with "Mary Street" and "I'm in Line" from the original vinyl EP release, and a very different mix of "The Real World" remixed and remastered by David Kahne prior to his producing the first Bangles album.

The full five-song set, however, remained out of print since its initial vinyl release until 2014, when it was included on the album Ladies and Gentlemen... The Bangles!. Featuring numerous early Bangles rarities, this compilation also includes a previously unreleased demo version of "The Real World", shorter and sung in a different key.

== Track listing ==
1. "The Real World" (Susanna Hoffs, Vicki Peterson)
2. "I'm in Line" (Debbi Peterson, V. Peterson, Hoffs)
3. "Want You" (V. Peterson)
4. "Mary Street" (Hoffs, V. Peterson)
5. "How Is the Air Up There?" (Steve Duboff, Artie Kornfeld)

1988 CD3 mini single

1. "The Real World" (Hoffs, V. Peterson) (remixed by David Kahne; previously unreleased)
2. "Mary Street" (Hoffs, V. Peterson)
3. "I'm in Line" (D. Peterson, V. Peterson, Hoffs)

== Personnel ==
The band's full musical credits are listed on the EP's back cover:

- Susanna Hoffs – rhythm guitar, vocals
- Debbi Peterson – drums, vocals
- Vicki Peterson – lead guitar, vocals
- Annette Zilinskas – bass guitar, harmonica, vocals
