= Walking Down Your Street =

Single by the Bangles

from the album Different Light
- B-side: "Let It Go"
- Released: December 1986 (UK); February 1987 (US)
- Recorded: 1985
- Studio: Sunset Sound Factory, Los Angeles
- Genre: Rock
- Length: 3:04 (LP version); 3:17 (7" mix)
- Label: Columbia
- Songwriters: Louis Gutierrez; Susanna Hoffs; David Kahne
- Producer: David Kahne

The Bangles singles chronology
"Walk Like an Egyptian" (1986)	"Walking Down Your Street" (1986)	"Following" (1987)

Music video
- "Walking Down Your Street" on YouTube

"Walking Down Your Street" is a song by the Bangles. It is the fourth single from their 1986 album Different Light. After its single release in 1987, the song charted at #9 on the Cash Box Top 100, #11 on the Billboard Hot 100, #16 on the UK Singles Chart, #26 on the Canadian RPM Top Singles and #56 on the Australian Kent Music Report chart. "Walking Down Your Street" was the final single from Different Light in the US; the album's next single, "Following", was only released in the UK.

== Production ==
The song was written in 1984 by singer-guitarist Susanna Hoffs with Louis Gutierrez, making it the Bangles' first of four US Top 40 hits composed by at least one band member. It is co-credited on the album and single to producer David Kahne.

"Walking Down the Street" was the most recent of a small batch of songs the band brought into the studio when recording for the album commenced in 1985. The original working title was "Desire". Hoffs has said she was going for a Supremes/Shangri-Las vocal style on the recording. It was initially discussed as a potential first single for Different Light, before "Manic Monday" was recorded.

The original LP version varies slightly from the 7" single mix and the version included on the 1990 Greatest Hits compilation. The video for the song features appearances by Randy Quaid and Little Richard.

== Video ==
The song's video features members of The Bangles as a neighborhood band, the Love Beats, that wins a contest in which the prize was a trip to Los Angeles to open a concert for Little Richard, who appears in the video chatting with the girls before they go on stage.

== Track listing ==
1. "Walking Down Your Street" – 3:17
2. "Return Post" – 4:21

== Charts ==
Chart performance for "Walking Down Your Street"
Chart (1987)	Peak position
Australia (Kent Music Report)	56
Belgium (Ultratop 50 Flanders)	22
Canada Top Singles (RPM)	26
Canada Adult Contemporary (RPM)	16
Ireland (IRMA)	4
Luxembourg (Radio Luxembourg)	12
New Zealand (Recorded Music NZ)	21
Quebec (ADISQ)	35
UK Singles (Official Charts)	16
US Adult Contemporary (Billboard)	33
US Billboard Hot 100	11
US Cash Box Top 100	9
West Germany (GfK)	32
Europe (European Hot 100 Singles)	33
Finland (Suomen virallinen singlelista)	16
