= Getting Out of Hand =

Single by the Bangles
- B-side: "Call on Me"
- Released: December 1981
- Genre: Pop rock
- Length: 2:13
- Label: Downkiddie Records
- Songwriter: Vicki Peterson
- Producer: The Bangles

The Bangles singles chronology
| "Getting Out of Hand" (1981) | "The Real World" (1983) |

Alternative cover
- 1982 reissue cover

"Getting Out of Hand" is the debut single by American female band the Bangles, produced by the band themselves and released in 1981.

The group was named at the time the Bangs, and its line-up consisted of Susanna Hoffs, Debbi Peterson and Vicki Peterson. The group was part of the Paisley Underground movement, a musical scene based around Los Angeles in which groups mixed 1960s-inspired pop with garage rock.

"Getting Out of Hand", written by Peterson and sung by Hoffs, was released as the Bangs' debut single on their own label DownKiddie Records, and distributed locally around Los Angeles in 1981. In order to gain more exposure, Hoffs personally handed a copy of the single to radio DJ Rodney Bingenheimer, pleading for the song to be aired on his radio show Rodney on the ROQ. In December 1981, Bingenheimer started playing the single, resulting in an increase of the audience on the band's live shows.

In early 1982, the Bangs had to rename themselves the Bangles after a New Jersey band with earlier naming rights threatened to sue the band. Accordingly, the single was reissued (again on the DownKiddie label) with the name change, with the subtitle "formerly the Bangs" on the cover. A group photograph on the back of this reissued single showed Bangles' bass player Annette Zilinskas, who had recently joined the band, although she did not play on the record.

The B-side, "Call On Me", was co-written by Hoffs, Peterson, and David Roback, a friend of Hoffs' brother and lead singer of fellow Paisley Underground band Rain Parade.

"Getting Out of Hand" was not a commercial success and did not hit the charts, but it did gain the attention of music executive Miles Copeland, who signed the band to his label Faulty Products. The Bangles then released the EP The Bangles in 1982, although neither "Getting out of Hand" nor "Call On Me" was included on the record.

"Getting Out of Hand" and "Call On Me" were never included on any Bangles studio album, and with the band shifting their sound as the 1980s progressed, the record fell into relative obscurity. In 2003, however, the group resurrected both songs and released as remastered B-sides to their new singles (respectively to "Something That You Said" and "Tear Off Your Own Head (It's A Doll Revolution)"). Both were included on the Japanese edition of their Doll Revolution album as bonus tracks.

== Track listing ==
1. "Getting Out of Hand" – 2:15
2. "Call On Me" – 1:31
