= Following (song) =

Single by the Bangles

from the album Different Light
- Released: 6 April 1987 (UK)
- Genre: Pop; acoustic
- Length: 3:22 (LP version); 2:55 (7" edit)
- Label: Columbia
- Songwriter: Michael Steele
- Producer: David Kahne

The Bangles singles chronology
"Walking Down Your Street" (1986)	"Following" (1987)	"Hazy Shade of Winter" (1987)

"Following" is a song by American pop rock band the Bangles, released in 1987 as the fifth and final single from their second studio album, Different Light (1986). The acoustic ballad has vocals by Michael Steele, who composed the song.

== Background and style ==
"Following" is one of two songs on Different Light on which Michael Steele sang lead vocals, the other one being a cover of Big Star's "September Gurls". The song was written solely by Steele, her first original composition released with the Bangles.

Musically, "Following" is radically different from the rest of Bangles' material, being a folky acoustic ballad featuring minimal instrumentation. Its lead instrument is an acoustic guitar. "Following" also features hovering, atmospheric keyboard sounds. The musical input from the other three Bangles members on the song appears to be limited to occasional wordless, atmospheric backing vocal textures.

Lyrically, the song deals with the subject of jealousy, paranoia and obsession that follows the breakup of a relationship. Sung in first person, the narrator starts with the accusations of stalking by the ex-lover. The gender of the ex-lover is not explicitly stated, although ambiguities in the lyrics suggest that the narrator may be referring to a female ex-lover (or a situation involving another, similar type of love triangle). As the song progresses, it is revealed both the narrator and the ex-lover accuse each other of obsessive behavior and paranoia. Steele half sings, half talks the lyrics, taking an approach similar to folk singer Bob Dylan or rock/jazz artist Rickie Lee Jones. Steele has indicated that Following was derived from personal experience, stating in a 2003 internet chat: "Yeah, it was about my high school sweetheart."

== Release and reception ==
"Following" was chosen as the band's fifth single from their successful Different Light album, and was released in April 1987 around Europe. It was never released in the USA. It would become the band's only single with Michael Steele on lead vocals.

For its single release, the track was edited from the album version, eliminating most of the outro. The single's B-side was "Dover Beach", a track from their 1984 album All Over the Place. The 12" single also included the "Bangles Hit Mix", a megamix including the band's previous four singles off Different Light and "Going Down To Liverpool" from their debut album.

The single was also released in two special editions, one including a poster of the single cover, and another including four badges.

No music video was done to support the release and the group did little promotion for it. "Following" peaked at #55 in the UK, and was a top 40 hit in Ireland, peaking at #22. It failed to chart in other European territories where it was not promoted.

== Charts ==
Chart (1987)	Peak position
Irish Singles Chart	22
UK Singles Chart	55
