= Less than Zero (soundtrack) =

Less than Zero: Original Motion Picture Soundtrack

Soundtrack album by various artists
- Released: November 16, 1987
- Recorded: 1987
- Genres: Rock; pop rock; hip hop; R&B; heavy metal
- Length: 41:28
- Labels: Def Jam; Columbia
- Producers: Chuck D; Eric "Vietnam" Sadler; Frederick Gordon; Hank Shocklee; Rick Rubin; Russell Simmons; Vincent Bell; Aerosmith (co.)

Singles from Less than Zero
- 1. "Rock and Roll All Nite" Released: October 12, 1987; 2. "Hazy Shade of Winter" Released: November 1987; 3. "Going Back to Cali" Released: January 25, 1988

Professional ratings
Review scores
Source	Rating
AllMusic	3/5 stars
Robert Christgau	B+
New Musical Express	8/10

Less than Zero is the soundtrack album to Marek Kanievska's 1987 drama film Less than Zero. It was released on November 16, 1987, through Def Jam/Columbia Records, and consisted of a variety of music genres, including hard rock, pop rock, hip hop, heavy metal and contemporary R&B, with most of the album being produced by Rick Rubin. The soundtrack found success, peaking at 31 on the Billboard 200 and 22 on the Top R&B/Hip-Hop Albums, and was certified gold by the Recording Industry Association of America on February 8, 1988.

Four singles made it to the Billboard charts. The Black Flames cover of "Are You My Woman (Tell Me So)" and Public Enemy's "Bring the Noise" were minor hits on the R&B charts, while LL Cool J's "Going Back to Cali" and The Bangles cover of "A Hazy Shade of Winter" reached Nos. 31 and 2 on the Billboard Hot 100, respectively.

== Track listing ==
No.	Title	Writer(s)	Producer(s)	Length
1.	"Rockin' Pneumonia and the Boogie Woogie Flu" (performed by Aerosmith)	Huey "Piano" Smith; Johnny Vincent	Rick Rubin; Aerosmith (co.)	2:56
2.	"Life Fades Away" (performed by Roy Orbison)	Glenn Danzig; Roy Orbison	Rick Rubin	3:42
3.	"Rock and Roll All Nite" (performed by Poison)	Paul Stanley; Gene Simmons	Rick Rubin	3:37
4.	"Going Back to Cali" (performed by LL Cool J)	James Todd Smith; Rick Rubin	Rick Rubin	4:10
5.	"You and Me (Less Than Zero)" (performed by Glenn Danzig & the Power and Fury Orchestra)	Danzig; Rubin	Rick Rubin	3:36
6.	"In-A-Gadda-Da-Vida" (performed by Slayer)	Doug Ingle	Rick Rubin	3:19
7.	"Bring the Noise" (performed by Public Enemy)	Carlton Ridenhour; James Henry Boxlee III; Eric Sadler	Carl Ryder; Hank Shocklee; Eric "Vietnam" Sadler	3:45
8.	"Are You My Woman? (Tell Me So)" (performed by the Black Flames)	Eugene Record	Russell Simmons; Vincent Bell	3:06
9.	"She's Lost You" (performed by Joan Jett and The Blackhearts)	Peter Gage	Rick Rubin	2:58
10.	"How to Love Again" (performed by Oran "Juice" Jones and Alyson Williams)	Frederick Paul Gordon; Vincent F. Bell	Frederick Gordon; Vincent Bell	4:42
11.	"Hazy Shade of Winter" (performed by The Bangles)	Paul Simon	Rick Rubin	2:47
Total length:				41:28

== Charts ==
Chart (1988)	Peak position
US Billboard 200	31
US Top R&B/Hip-Hop Albums (Billboard)	22

== Certifications ==
Region	Certification	Certified units/sales
United States (RIAA)	Gold	500,000^{^}
^{^} Shipments figures based on certification alone.
