= Different Light =

Studio album by the Bangles
- Released: January 13, 1986
- Recorded: 1985
- Studios: Sunset Sound and Sunset Sound Factory (Hollywood, California)
- Genre: Pop rock
- Length: 38:48
- Label: Columbia
- Producer: David Kahne

The Bangles chronology
All Over the Place (1984)	Different Light (1986)	Everything (1988)

Singles from Different Light
- 1. "Manic Monday" Released: December 23, 1985; 2. "If She Knew What She Wants" Released: April 14, 1986; 3. "Walk Like an Egyptian" Released: September 1, 1986; 4. "Walking Down Your Street" Released: December 1986 (UK); 5. "Following" Released: April 1987 (UK)

Different Light is the second studio album by American pop rock band the Bangles, released on January 13, 1986, by Columbia Records. The band recorded the album in 1985 with producer David Kahne. Its Top 40 sound was a departure from the Bangles' earlier 1960s-style rock and roll sound. It is their most successful album, reaching number two on the Billboard 200 and producing five charting singles, including the Billboard Hot 100 top two hits "Manic Monday" and "Walk Like an Egyptian". It is also the first album in which bassist Michael Steele sings lead vocals on some tracks.

The 2008 CD reissue on the Wounded Bird Records label (WOU 4039) adds a bonus track: "Walk Like an Egyptian (Extended Dance Mix)".

== Singles ==
Different Light produced five singles, the first three of which were written by someone other than the Bangles. Lead single "Manic Monday", written by Prince under the pseudonym "Christopher" in 1984 as a duet for Apollonia 6's self-titled album, peaked at number two in the United Kingdom and the United States in 1986. "If She Knew What She Wants", the second single from Different Light, was recorded by Jules Shear on his 1985 album The Eternal Return. The song was written in the first person, however the Bangles rewrote the lyrics in the third person as they considered it more appropriate; their version charted at number 29 in the United States and number 31 in the United Kingdom. "Walk Like an Egyptian" was written by Liam Sternberg after seeing people on a ferry walking awkwardly to keep their balance as figures do in ancient Egyptian reliefs; it became one of the most successful singles by the Bangles, hitting number one in the United States, Denmark, and the Netherlands, as well as peaking at number three in the United Kingdom. "Walking Down Your Street" hit number 11 in the United States and number 16 in the United Kingdom, and a fifth single, "Following", was released exclusively in the latter country, where it reached number 55.

== Album cover variations ==
The covers of most of the album's cassette pressings and the sheet music songbook only show 12 (out of 16) of the "different" snapshots, eliminating the third column to best fit the rectangular layout of cassette cases and book.

The back cover of European-made CDs replicates the back cover of the vinyl LP edition, with all 16 snapshots and the track index at the top. The back cover of the US version, however, only shows the first column of four snapshots, with the track index list occupying the rest of the space – a rare deviation for Columbia's CD issues during the 1980s.

== Critical reception ==
Professional ratings
Review scores
Source	Rating
AllMusic	3/5 stars
The Baltimore Sun	4/5 stars
Classic Pop	4/5 stars
Los Angeles Times	3/4 stars
Record Mirror	3.5/5
The Rolling Stone Album Guide	2.5/5 stars
Slant Magazine	4/5 stars
Smash Hits	7/10
Spin Alternative Record Guide	6/10
The Village Voice	B

Billboard commented that "the Californian quartet's spare '60s-influenced pop/rock gets a facelift from producer Kahne, who shepherds the band's shift toward a more emphatic pop sensibility by focusing on a lusher, more layered vocal sound." "Old fans will be divided over whether the change represents new subtlety or simply a softer edge," the review continued, "but the polish should help broaden their radio profile." Cashbox said that the band had "taken its ragged L.A. street image and polished it for what looks like a national campaign", noting that the album's "American sound, repleat with guitar-laden nascent psychedelia," makes it "right in line with current musical taste."

Rolling Stone critic Laura Fissinger observed that Different Light uses "less hook-happy song structure and more modernized production" than the Bangles' 1984 debut All Over the Place, "covering their roots without burying them ten feet under." She disagreed with objections to its more "deliberate, sophisticated and airwaves ready" production and felt that the album "puts then and now in significantly better balance", while also finding that the band had advanced "past the fan-apes-idol phase" in their musicianship.

In a retrospective review for Slant Magazine, Sal Cinquemani wrote that while Different Light was perceived as "a slicker, more commercial move for the Bangles at the time of its release", it "sounds surprisingly fresh in hindsight", adding that the band's "'60s-style pop melodies and classic rock references ... were deftly matched with the then-current new wave and rock rhythms of the early '80s." Classic Pop's Will Simpson said that with its mix of hit singles and other songs recalling the band's Paisley Underground origins, "the grit and gloss balance nicely." Slant Magazine ranked Different Light at number 78 on its 2012 list of the best albums of the 1980s. Slant also included it on their 2003 list of 50 Essential Pop Albums.

== Track listing ==
No.	Title	Writer(s)	Lead vocals	Length
1.	"Manic Monday"	"Christopher" (Prince)	Hoffs	3:06
2.	"In a Different Light"	Susanna Hoffs, Vicki Peterson	V. Peterson	2:52
3.	"Walking Down Your Street"	Hoffs, Louis Gutierrez, David Kahne	Hoffs	3:04
4.	"Walk Like an Egyptian"	Liam Sternberg	V. Peterson, Steele and Hoffs	3:24
5.	"Standing in the Hallway"	Hoffs, Kahne, Debbi Peterson, V. Peterson	D. Peterson	2:56
6.	"Return Post"	Hoffs, V. Peterson	V. Peterson	4:22
7.	"If She Knew What She Wants" (Jules Shear cover, 1985)	Jules Shear	Hoffs	3:49
8.	"Let It Go"	Hoffs, D. Peterson, V. Peterson, Michael Steele	Group	2:32
9.	"September Gurls" (Big Star cover, 1974)	Alex Chilton	Steele	2:45
10.	"Angels Don't Fall in Love"	Hoffs, V. Peterson	V. Peterson	3:23
11.	"Following"	Steele	Steele	3:21
12.	"Not Like You"	Hoffs, Kahne, D. Peterson	D. Peterson	3:06
Total length:				38:48

== Personnel ==
The Bangles

- Susanna Hoffs – vocals, guitars
- Vicki Peterson – vocals, lead guitar
- Michael Steele – vocals, bass
- Debbi Peterson – vocals, drums

Additional musicians

- Mitchell Froom – keyboards
- David Kahne – keyboards, LinnDrum programming
- Rusty Anderson – additional guitars
- Barbara Chapman – additional guitars, harp
- William Jones – electric sitar (uncredited)
- Carlos Vega – additional drums

== Production ==
- Producer – David Kahne
- Engineers – Tchad Blake and Peggy McLeonard
- Assistant engineers – David Glover and Mike Kloster
- Mixing – David Leonard
- Art direction – Nancy Donald and Tony Lane
- Photography – Raul Vega
- Wardrobe – Genny Schorr and Tony Riviera

== Charts ==
=== Weekly charts ===
Weekly chart performance for Different Light
Chart (1986–1987)	Peak position
Australian Albums (Kent Music Report)	2
Canada Top Albums/CDs (RPM)	8
Dutch Albums (Album Top 100)	26
European Albums (Music & Media)	19
Finnish Albums (Suomen virallinen lista)	30
German Albums (Offizielle Top 100)	21
Italian Albums (Musica e dischi)	15
New Zealand Albums (RMNZ)	4
Norwegian Albums (VG-lista)	5
Swedish Albums (Sverigetopplistan)	24
Swiss Albums (Schweizer Hitparade)	16
UK Albums (Official Charts)	3
US Billboard 200	2
US Cash Box Top 200 Albums	2

=== Year-end charts ===
1986 year-end chart performance for Different Light
Chart (1986)	Position
Canada Top Albums/CDs (RPM)	66
European Albums (Music & Media)	51
UK Albums (Gallup)	36
US Billboard 200	27

1987 year-end chart performance for Different Light
Chart (1987)	Position
Australian Albums (Kent Music Report)	10
Canada Top Albums/CDs (RPM)	39
European Albums (Music & Media)	78
New Zealand Albums (RMNZ)	45
UK Albums (Gallup)	82
US Billboard 200	25

== Certifications ==
Certifications for Different Light
Region	Certification	Certified units/sales
Australia (ARIA)	2× Platinum	140,000^{^}
Canada (Music Canada)	2× Platinum	200,000^{^}
New Zealand (RMNZ)	Platinum	15,000^{^}
United Kingdom (BPI)	Platinum	300,000^{^}
United States (RIAA)	3× Platinum	3,000,000^{^}
^{^} Shipments figures based on certification alone.
