= The Bangles =

American pop rock band

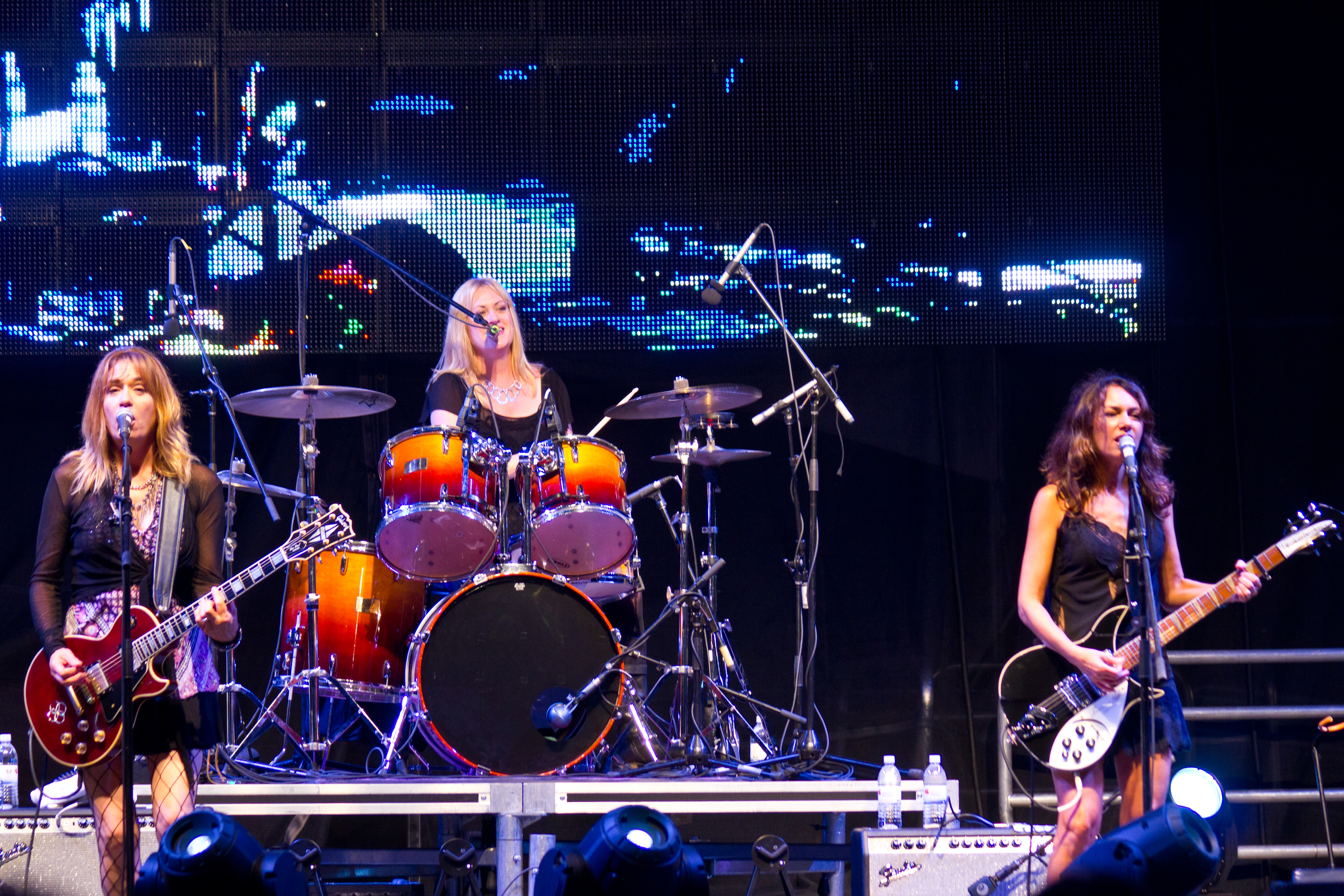
- The Bangles in 2012

Background information
- Also known as: Bangles; The Bangs
- Origin: Los Angeles, California, U.S.
- Genres: Pop rock; power pop; new wave; paisley underground
- Years active: 1981–1989; 1998–present
- Labels: Discos CBS; Columbia; Epic; I.R.S.; Elektra; Koch
- Members: Susanna Hoffs; Debbi Peterson; Vicki Peterson; Annette Zilinskas
- Past members: Michael Steele
- Website: thebangles.com

The Bangles are an American all-female pop rock band formed in Los Angeles in 1981. They are known for hit singles in the 1980s, making them one of the most successful pop-rock groups of the decade. The band’s biggest commercial successes include "Walk Like an Egyptian" (1986), which became a worldwide phenomenon; "Manic Monday" (1986), a song written by Prince; and a cover of Simon & Garfunkel’s "Hazy Shade of Winter" (1987), which was featured in the film Less Than Zero. Their ballad "Eternal Flame" (1989) became a big hit, topping the charts in several countries, and is one of their signature songs. Other hits included "In Your Room" (1988) and "If She Knew What She Wants" (1986).

Formed by Susanna Hoffs and sisters Vicki Peterson and Debbi Peterson, the group began as part of the Paisley Underground scene, a Los Angeles music movement heavily influenced by 1960s rock and psychedelic music. Their early work blended jangly guitar melodies with power-pop sensibilities. The original lineup included Hoffs (guitar and vocals), Vicki Peterson (guitar and vocals), Debbi Peterson (drums and vocals), and Annette Zilinskas (bass). After Zilinskas left in 1983 to focus on other projects, Michael Steele, formerly of the Runaways, joined as bassist and vocalist, cementing the classic lineup.

Their 1984 debut album, All Over the Place, received critical acclaim and earned the group a loyal following, setting the stage for their commercial breakthrough with the 1986 album Different Light. The success of Different Light established the Bangles as one of the top female-fronted acts of the 1980s.

After their third album, Everything (1988), and the success of "Eternal Flame", the band struggled with internal tensions, leading to their initial disbandment in 1989. However, they reunited in the late 1990s, recording new material and performing live. In 2018, founding bassist Annette Zilinskas rejoined the group.

== History ==
=== Formation and early years (1981–1983) ===
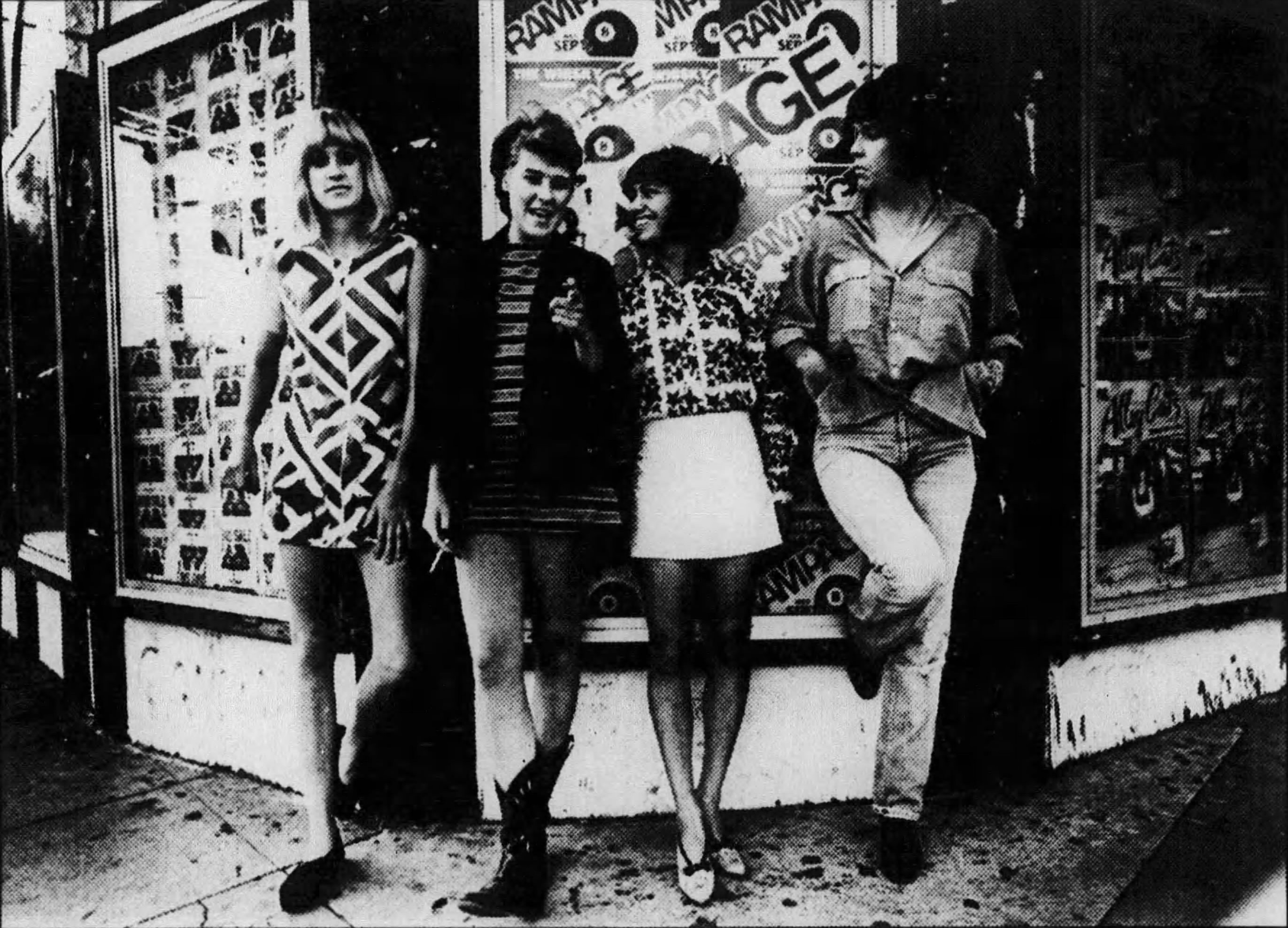
The Bangles in 1982

Susanna Hoffs and sisters Vicki and Debbi Peterson had each been in bands before coming together in Los Angeles, California, in December 1980. The impetus was two classified advertisements in the weekly paper The Recycler. One had been placed by Hoffs, and the only person to respond was Annette Zilinskas, and the other was by Lynn Elkind, the Petersons' housemate and a departing member of their then band Those Girls. When Hoffs called in response to Elkind's ad, Vicki Peterson answered the phone, and in their conversation, they discovered a great deal of common interests.

When Hoffs spoke to Elkind after Peterson gave her the message, Hoffs and Elkind did not have the same interests and Hoffs then formed a new band with the Petersons. The Those Girls bass guitarist, Vicki Peterson's lifelong best friend Amanda Hills, had also left the band. (Now a history professor, Amanda Hills Podany has performed as a guest with the Bangles on a few rare occasions.) and this left an opening for Zilinskas. When Annette Zilinskas responded to the ad in The Recycler, Hoffs told Zilinskas that the band was looking for a bass player and asked if she would be interested. Zilinskas accepted and the lineup was set. The resulting (and also current as of 2026) lineup first performed as the Colours in 1981.

Shortly afterward, they renamed themselves the Bangs. The band was part of the Los Angeles Paisley Underground scene, which featured groups that played a mixture of 1960s-influenced rock. In 1981, Hoffs and the Petersons recorded and released a single ("Getting Out of Hand" with "Call on Me" on the B side) on DownKiddie Records (their own label). The Bangs were signed to Faulty Products, a label formed by Miles Copeland.

The early Bangles lineup of Susanna Hoffs (vocals/guitars), Vicki Peterson (guitars/vocals), Debbi Peterson (vocals/drums) and Annette Zilinskas (vocals/bass) recorded an EP in 1982 and released the single "The Real World". For the release of the EP, they played in the Lhasa Club in Hollywood. At the last minute, they discovered another band had registered the Bangs name and would not let them use it without payment. In the meantime, Hoffs and Vicki Peterson appeared on a 1983 album Rainy Day (also the name of the group) which also featured members of Rain Parade, the Dream Syndicate and the Three O'Clock. The album was released in 1984 on Llama Records (E1024), and featured Hoffs on lead vocals on cover versions of Bob Dylan's "I'll Keep It with Mine" and Lou Reed's "I'll Be Your Mirror".

Their first EP was retitled Bangles and released. In 1983, Faulty Products issued a 12-inch "remix" single of "The Real World" to radio and media, but another setback came as the label folded. I.R.S. Records picked up distribution and reissued the EP. After Zilinskas left the band to focus on her own project Blood on the Saddle, she was replaced by Michael Steele, formerly of the all-female band the Runaways, Toni & the Movers, Slow Children and Elton Duck.

=== Career peak (1984–1989) ===
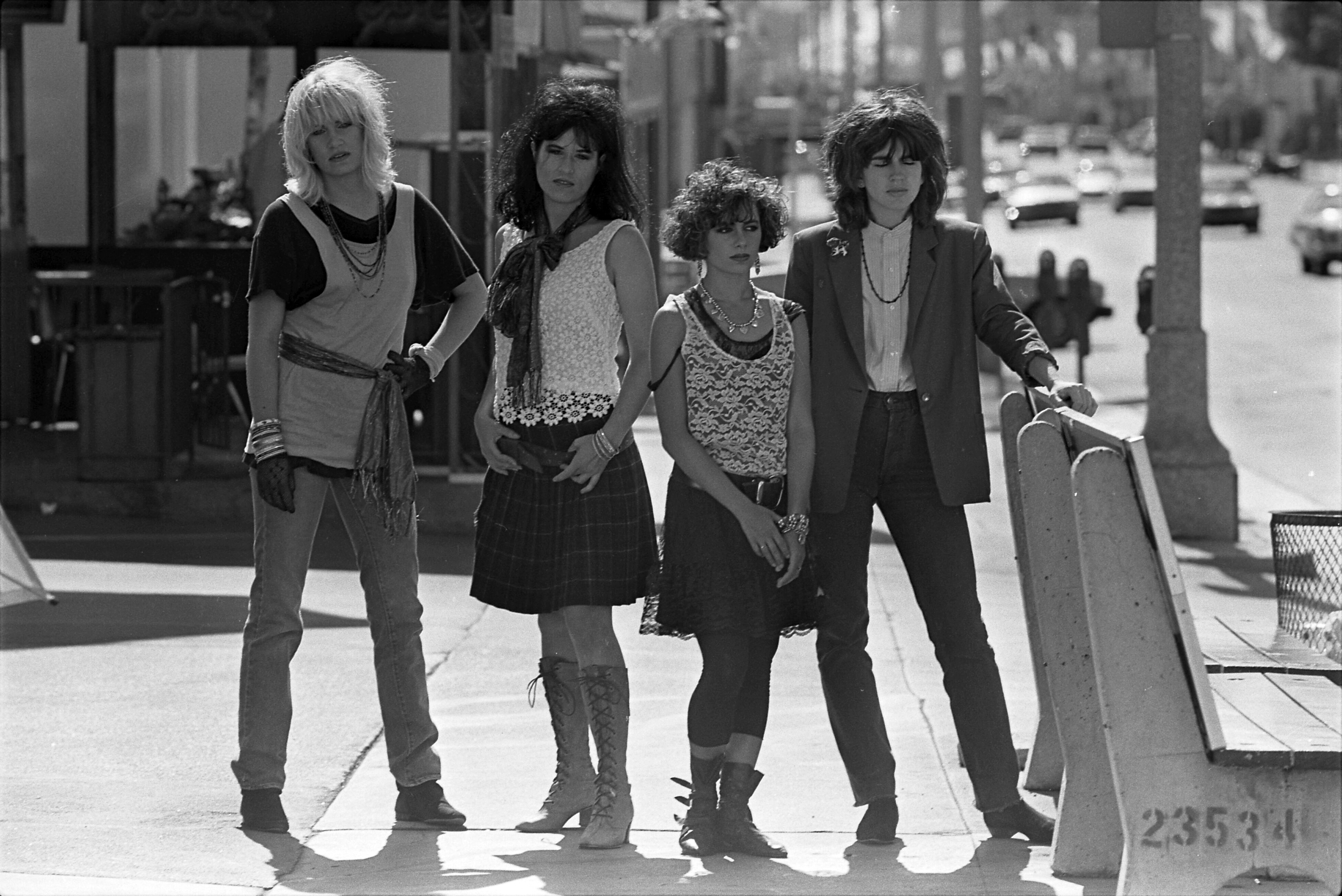
The Bangles in 1984

The Bangles' full-length debut album on Columbia Records, All Over the Place (1984), captured their power pop roots, featuring the singles "Hero Takes a Fall" and the Kimberley Rew-penned Beatlesque "Going Down to Liverpool" (originally recorded by Rew's band Katrina and the Waves). The record received positive reviews and the video for "Liverpool" featured Leonard Nimoy, which helped to generate further publicity. This came about through a friendship between the Hoffs and Nimoy families. They received a much wider audience serving as the opening act for Cyndi Lauper on her Fun Tour.

All this went some way to attracting the attention of Prince, who gave them "Manic Monday" originally written for his group Apollonia 6. "Manic Monday" went on to become a number-two hit in the US, the UK and Germany, outsold at the time only by another Prince composition, his own "Kiss". The band's second album, Different Light (January 1986), was more polished than its predecessor, and, with the help of the worldwide number-one hit "Walk Like an Egyptian" (written by Liam Sternberg), put the band firmly in the mainstream, reaching number two on the Billboard 200.

The song was sent to them in midsession and the group was divided about whether it would be a failure or a success. When it was released, the group was amazed to discover that it brought them a new audience of female fans, most of them very young. Commented Michael Steele to a Nine-O-One Network Magazine writer: "When I go out now it is usually girls who recognize me." Three additional hit singles released from the Different Light album were "Following" (top 40 in Ireland), "Walking Down Your Street" (number 11 on the US Billboard Hot 100) and the wistful "If She Knew What She Wants", written and first recorded by Jules Shear (which reached 29 on the Hot 100 in the summer of 1986 and was in the German top 20 for 13 weeks).

The band had another hit with a cover of Simon & Garfunkel's "A Hazy Shade of Winter" (1987) from the soundtrack of the film Less than Zero. The song reached number 2 in February 1988.

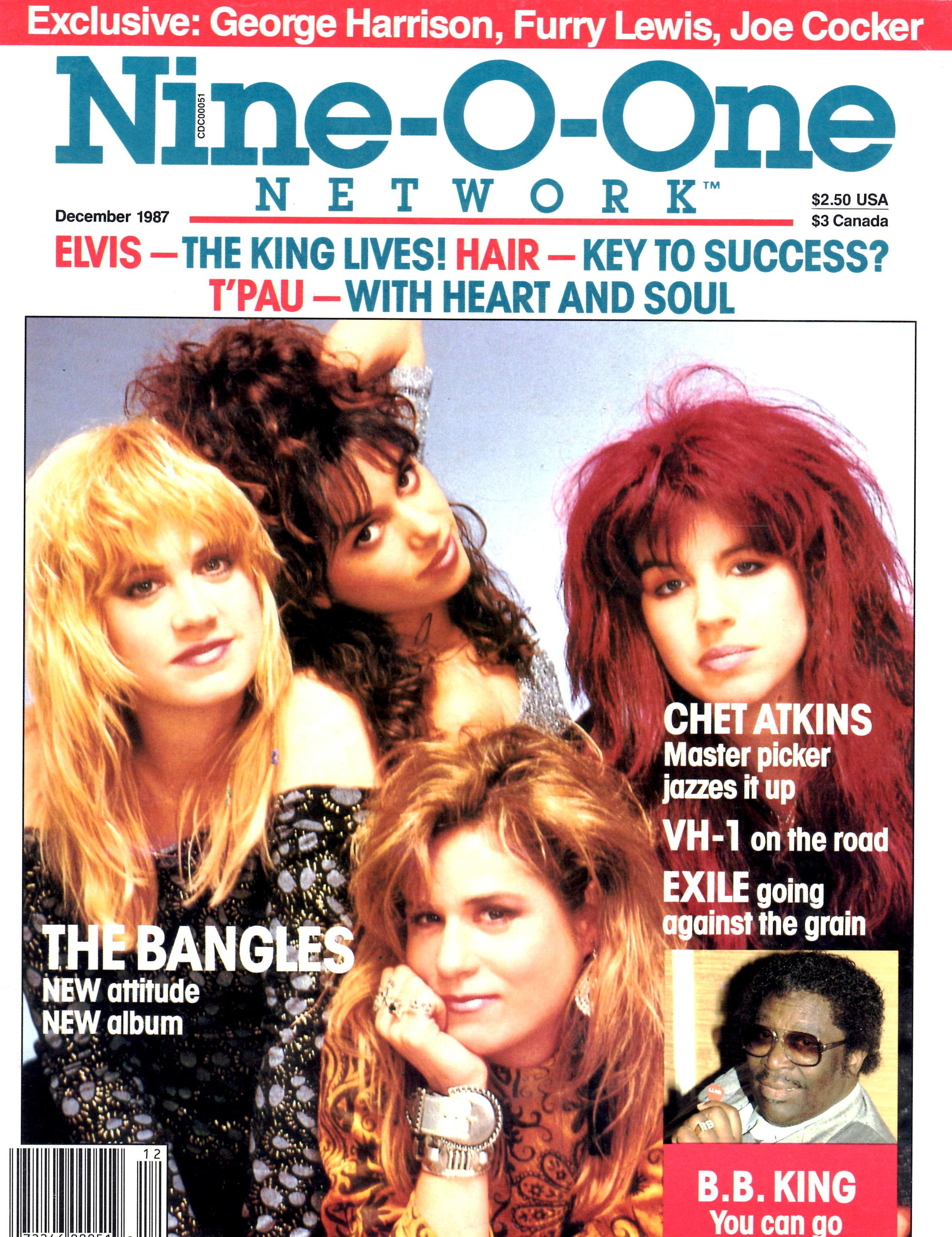
The Bangles on the cover of the December 1987 edition of Nine-O-One Network

The album Everything (1988) was produced by Davitt Sigerson, as the band had had a negative reaction to working with David Kahne on Different Light. It was another multiplatinum hit and included the top-five hit "In Your Room", as well as their biggest-selling single "Eternal Flame". Co-writer Billy Steinberg came up with the title after Hoffs told him about the band's recent trip to Memphis, Tennessee, where they visited Graceland, Elvis Presley's estate. An eternal flame is maintained at Presley's grave, but it had gone out on the day of their visit, and its clear plastic enclosure was flooded. They asked what was in the box and were told, "That's the eternal flame."

The single became their biggest worldwide hit and the biggest single by an all-female band in history. Hoffs was naked when she recorded the song, convinced by Sigerson that Olivia Newton-John got her amazing performances by recording everything naked. Hoffs said she felt it was like 'skinny dipping' and recorded most of the rest of the album naked.

=== Disbandment (1989) ===
Friction arose among band members after music industry media began singling out Hoffs as the lead singer of the group. In fact, singing duties on the band's albums were divided among the band's members, each of whom wrote or co-wrote songs. The band broke up in 1989.

Hoffs began a solo career and Vicki Peterson toured as a member of the Continental Drifters and as a fill-in member of the Go-Go's. Michael Steele joined a band that did not last long called Crash Wisdom, in which she performed songs such as "Nickel Romeo" and "Between the Two" which both would later be used for the Bangles's 2003 reunion album Doll Revolution.

=== Re-formation (1998–present) ===
In 1998, the band reformed to record a song for the soundtrack of Austin Powers: The Spy Who Shagged Me, at the behest of the film's director Jay Roach (who had married Hoffs in 1993). The song chosen for the album was "Get the Girl" and was released in 1999. The reunion continued with a tour in 2000. Later the same year, the group was also inducted into the Vocal Group Hall of Fame. From 2001 to 2002, they were in the studio recording the album Doll Revolution at Icon Recording Studios, Hollywood, California. The album, featuring such songs as "Stealing Rosemary", "Ride the Ride", "Nickel Romeo", and the single "Something That You Said", was released in early 2003.

The title track, which was written by Elvis Costello, was originally recorded for his 2002 album When I Was Cruel. Doll Revolution was a solid comeback success in Germany after the Bangles had performed in Germany's biggest television show Wetten dass, but failed to make any impact in other markets such as the UK, the U.S. and Australia. In July 2004, Paul McCartney presented the Bangles with "honorary rock'n'roll diplomas" from his Liverpool Institute for Performing Arts.

In 2005, Michael Steele left the band due to disputes over touring and recording. She was replaced by touring bassist Abby Travis for live appearances. On December 31, 2005, the group performed "Hazy Shade of Winter" in front of Times Square and later "Eternal Flame" as part of Dick Clark's New Year's Rockin' Eve 2006. Travis was fired in 2008.

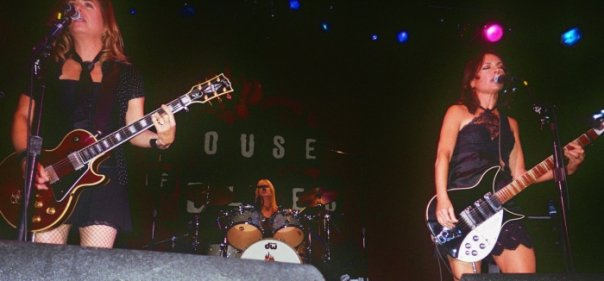
The Bangles performing at the House of Blues in Cleveland, Ohio, in August 2007

In the spring of 2009, the Bangles returned to the studio to begin work on a new album entitled Sweetheart of the Sun, which was released on September 27, 2011. The band went on tour in late 2011 in support of it, with dates on the East Coast, Midwest and West Coast. Openers for the various dates included rock band Antigone Rising and power pop band A Fragile Tomorrow.

In December 2013, the Bangles played two nights with three other reunited Paisley Underground bands—the Dream Syndicate, the Three O'Clock and Rain Parade—at the Fillmore in San Francisco and the Fonda Theatre in Los Angeles (benefit concert). Their set list focused on their early material, with remarks from the band at the beginning of the Fillmore show that they were going to be playing songs that they had not played in 30 years. In January 2014, they performed at the Whisky a Go Go in West Hollywood, California, in celebration of the Whisky's 50th anniversary.

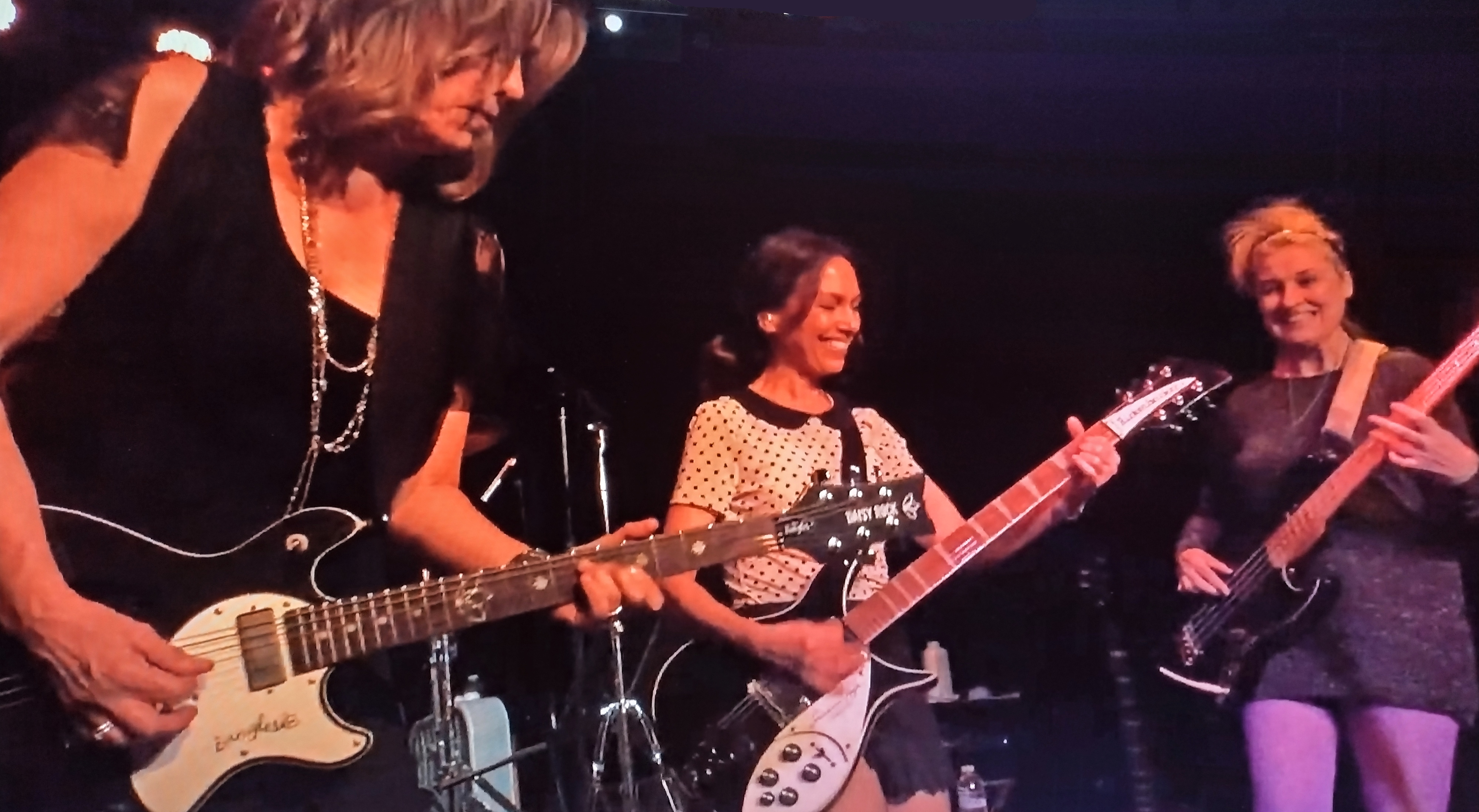
Founding bass player Annette Zilinskas joins Susanna Hoffs, Vicki Peterson, and Debbi Peterson of the Bangles for a live show in 2016 at The Whisky A Go Go.

Original bassist Annette Zilinskas began joining the band for selected live shows in 2014 and rejoined the band in 2018. This was the first time the original founding four members of the Bangles had played together since 1983.

Three new recordings by the Bangles were released in November 2018 as part of a compilation album called 3 × 4, which also included the Dream Syndicate, the Three O'Clock and Rain Parade, with each of the four bands covering songs by the other bands. Following the initial Record Store Day first-release as a double album on "psychedelic swirl" purple vinyl, Yep Roc Records released the album on LP, CD and digital in February 2019. All four of these bands assembled to play at the Grammy Museum in May 2019.

== Band members ==
=== Current ===
- Vicki Peterson – lead guitar, backing vocals (1981–1989, 1998–present)
- Susanna Hoffs – lead vocals, rhythm guitar, piano (1981–1989, 1998–present)
- Debbi Peterson – drums, acoustic guitar, percussion, backing vocals (1981–1989, 1998–present)
- Annette Zilinskas – bass guitar, occasional backing vocals, harmonica (1981–1983, 2018–present)

=== Former ===
- Michael Steele – bass guitar, acoustic guitar, occasional backing vocals (1983–1989, 1998–2005)

=== Touring ===
- Abby Travis – bass guitar (2005–2008)
- Derrick Anderson – bass guitar (2008–2016)
- Walker Igleheart – keyboards (1980s)
- Greg "Harpo" Hilfman – keyboards (1989, 1998–2011)

== Discography ==
Studio albums

- All Over the Place (1984)
- Different Light (1986)
- Everything (1988)
- Doll Revolution (2003)
- Sweetheart of the Sun (2011)

== Awards and nominations ==
Awards and nominations received by the Bangles
Year	Awards	Work	Category	Result
1987	Brit Awards	Themselves	Best International Group	Won
1987	Smash Hits Poll Winners Party	Themselves	Most Promising New Act	Nominated
1987	American Video Awards	"Walk Like an Egyptian"	Best Group Performance	Won
1987	MTV Video Music Awards	"Walk Like an Egyptian"	Best Group Video	Nominated
1987	MTV Video Music Awards	"Walk Like an Egyptian"	Best Choreography	Nominated
1988	MTV Video Music Awards	"Hazy Shade of Winter"	Best Video from a Film	Nominated
1988	Nickelodeon's Kids Choice Awards	Themselves	Favorite Music Group	Nominated
1988	Pollstar Concert Industry Awards	Themselves	Next Major Arena Headliner	Nominated
1989	Smash Hits Poll Winners Party	Themselves	Best Group	Nominated
1990	ASCAP Pop Music Awards	"Eternal Flame"	Most Performed Song	Won
2015	She Rocks Awards	Themselves	Lifetime Achievement Award	Won
