= Michael Steele (musician) =

American rock musician

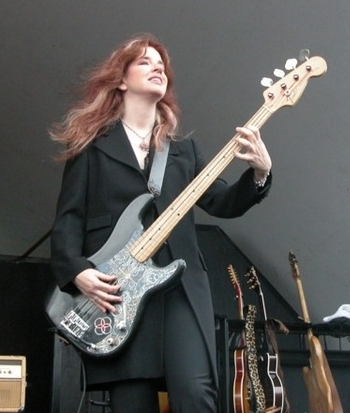
- Steele in 2003

Background information
- Also known as: Micki Steele
- Born: Susan Thomas; June 2, 1955 (age 71); Pasadena, California, U.S.
- Genres: Hard rock; pop rock
- Occupation: Musician
- Instruments: Bass; vocals; guitar
- Years active: 1975–2004

Michael Steele (born Susan Thomas; June 2, 1955) is an American former musician, best known as the bassist for the Bangles. Under the name Micki Steele, she was a founding member of the Runaways but left in 1975, shortly before the band's major label debut. For the next several years, she played with various other musical groups for short periods of time.

In 1983, Steele replaced original bassist Annette Zilinskas as a member of the Bangles. Steele joined just in time to play on the band's first full-length album, All Over the Place. She remained with the Bangles throughout the high point of their career, contributing as bassist, vocalist, and songwriter until the band's dissolution in 1989. She rejoined the band for a 2003 reunion album, Doll Revolution, and toured with them until the following year. Afterwards, Steele retired from the music industry and left the public eye.

== Career ==
Steele began her professional career as Micki Steele in the teen-girl band the Runaways, one of the first all-female rock groups. Her stay was brief, leaving the band in late 1975, months before the recording of their first album. The main recording of this early period is an August 1975 demo session, bootlegged and later released as the 1993 album Born to Be Bad, with Steele playing bass and singing lead vocals on most songs. This release has her first songwriting credit with "Born to Be Bad", cowritten with Sandy West and Kim Fowley. The Runaways recorded a second demo at the famed Gold Star Studios in September 1975; as of 2019 it remains officially unreleased.

Steele's departure from the group has been given several interpretations—her own account being that she was fired by manager Kim Fowley for refusing his sexual advances, and calling the band's debut single "Cherry Bomb" stupid. Fowley denigrated her for blowing a chance at fame and not possessing sufficient "magic" or "megalo" to make it in the music industry.

Steele played in many Los Angeles bands between 1976 and 1983, including the power-pop outfit Elton Duck (1979–80), an early version of Slow Children (1979), Toni and the Movers with Jack Sherman (1980–81), the improvisational band Nadia Kapiche (1981) and a brief period as bass player in avant-garde rock outfit Snakefinger.

Her influences include Paul McCartney, John Entwistle, Colin Moulding, Tom Petersson, Carol Kaye and Suzi Quatro.

=== The Bangles ===
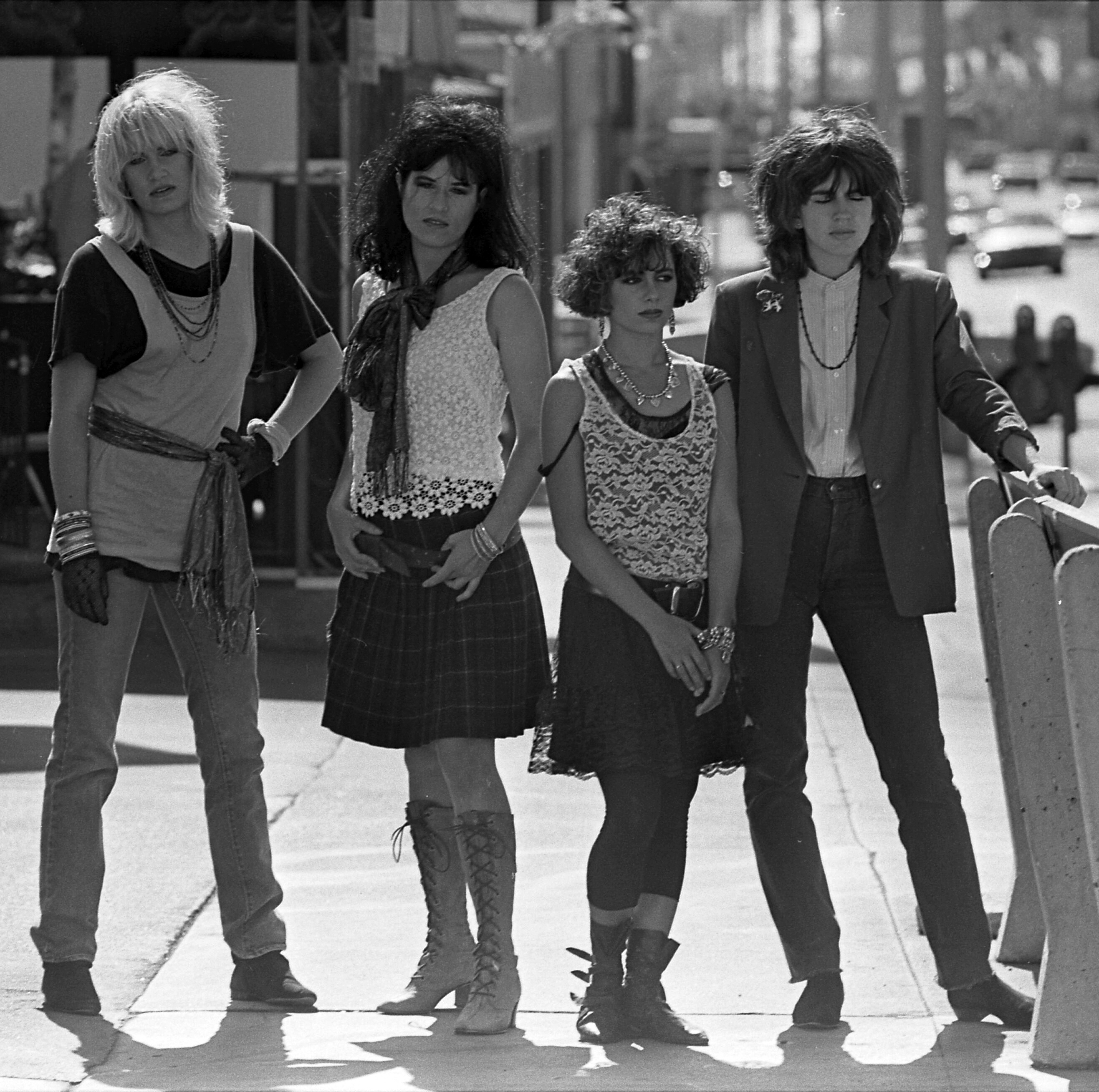
The Bangles L-R: Debbi Peterson, Vicki Peterson, Susanna Hoffs and Michael Steele (1984)

In mid-1983, Steele replaced Annette Zilinskas in the Bangles, a then little-known group. At this point, Steele was solely the band's bassist with no released compositions: her only live lead vocal at this time was on the band's cover of the Yardbirds' version of "I'm Not Talkin'" by Mose Allison. Steele was the oldest member of the band; Zilinskas had been the youngest.

==== All Over the Place ====
The Bangles' 1984 debut LP All Over the Place is the band's only album with no Steele-written songs (aside from Sweetheart of the Sun, released 6 years after Steele's departure from the band); her biggest showcase on the album is the bass solo on "Tell Me".

In addition to All Over the Place, in 1984 Steele also wrote and recorded the political spoken-word piece "El Pollo Loco" for the double LP compilation Neighborhood Rhythms.

==== Different Light ====
Although All Over the Place was well regarded by critics, it was not a chart success. Like her bandmates, Steele only achieved popular success and fame with the 1986 release of Different Light and its hit singles "Manic Monday" (No. 2) and "Walk Like an Egyptian" (No. 1). In addition to playing melodic and often intricate basslines, Steele sings lead on two songs: a cover of Big Star's "September Gurls", later credited for belatedly bringing songwriter Alex Chilton a large income from royalties, and the self-penned "Following", a stark and introspective ballad far from the glossy sound and more standard lyrical themes of Different Light's other tracks. Rolling Stone magazine praised "Following" upon the album's release as its standout song, a dark composition that pointed the band in new jazz and folk directions, only some of which were explored. Steele also sings lead on the second verse of "Walk Like an Egyptian".

As often discussed in later interviews, Different Light was also the product of significant contention and tension between the band and producer David Kahne; much of this contention surrounding the use of musicians outside the band on some songs. Despite lingering controversy about the extent to which session musicians were employed on the album, Steele is the only band member confirmed not to have been overdubbed, an achievement she later joked was only because Kahne "ran out of money".

==== Everything ====
A commercial success on its 1988 release, Everything was the Bangles' final album before their 1989 breakup. In terms of Steele's career, Everything also reflects her development as a songwriter, with her three songs, "Complicated Girl", "Something To Believe In" and "Glitter Years" being the most she had written on an album to this point. Two further songs written for the Everything sessions did not appear on the album, with "Between the Two" eventually appearing on 2003's Doll Revolution, and "Happy Man Today", played live on the band's summer 1987 tour, remaining unreleased. In addition to her usual bass credits, Steele is also credited with several guitar parts, referred to in the album liner notes as "occasional guitar". Although none of Steele's songs were released as singles, they were seen by several critics upon Everything's release as among the album's best tracks. A particularly emphatic example is that of the Chicago Sun-Times, stating that her songs provide "most of the album's highlights", combining sophistication and accessibility.

=== 1990s ===
Steele initially sought to write and record material for a solo release. She remained musically active throughout much of the decade. Besides recording songs for an unreleased solo album, she played in several bands in this time, most notably as rhythm guitarist and singer in her short-lived band Crash Wisdom (producing several more unreleased songs) and as bassist in Michelle Muldrow's San Francisco-based group Eyesore.

==== Doll Revolution ====
By the late 1990s, the Bangles agreed to reunite, with Steele being the last holdout, joining the reunion only with the expectation that they would focus on releasing new material and not become a "Dick Clark oldies band". The band soon recorded a 15-track album that was released in 2003 as Doll Revolution. The album had three Steele songs; "Nickel Romeo", "Between the Two" and the previously unheard "Song for a Good Son". Positive and negative reviews alike again noted these songs for their strikingly different sound and mood to the rest of the album.

Despite initial brief tours in 2003, various family commitments for her bandmates meant that the band could not tour and support the album following its American release as much as Steele wished, a problem later noted by Susanna Hoffs as contributing to Steele's leaving the band in the middle of a tour. Although her final concert was in early 2004, her departure was not officially acknowledged until May 2005.

In this period Steele also contributed guest bass parts to two albums by Lisa Dewey, playing on Weather Changer Girl (2000) and Busk (2004).

== Discography ==
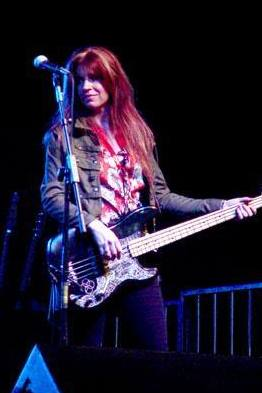
Steele performing

=== Albums ===
Release	Group	Title
1976	The Runaways	Born to Be Bad
1984	The Bangles	All Over the Place
1986	The Bangles	Different Light
1988	The Bangles	Everything
1990	The Bangles	Greatest Hits
2003	The Bangles	Doll Revolution
