= All Over the Place (The Bangles album) =

Studio album by the Bangles
- Released: May 23, 1984
- Recorded: October 1983 – February 1984
- Studios: Crystal Sound and Soundcastle (Hollywood, CA); Skyline Recording (Topanga, CA).
- Genres: Pop rock; new wave; power pop
- Length: 31:33
- Label: Columbia
- Producer: David Kahne

The Bangles chronology
Bangles (1982)	All Over the Place (1984)	Different Light (1986)

Singles from All Over the Place
- 1. "Hero Takes a Fall" Released: June 1984; 2. "Going Down to Liverpool" Released: September 1984

All Over the Place is the debut studio album by American pop rock band the Bangles. Released in May 1984 by Columbia Records, the album was not a major commercial success – peaking at number 80 on the Billboard 200 albums chart. It sold respectably, mostly through steady airplay on college radio stations. It also gave the band the chance to perform as an opening act for Cyndi Lauper and Huey Lewis and the News, and brought the group to the attention of Prince, who would write "Manic Monday", their first hit.

Two singles were released from the album: "Hero Takes a Fall", which peaked outside the top 40 on the UK Singles Chart, and "Going Down to Liverpool", written by Kimberley Rew of Katrina and the Waves. The video for "Going Down to Liverpool" features Leonard Nimoy, who plays the part of the band's chauffeur.

The album was reissued in 2008 on the Wounded Bird Records label (WOU 9220) adding a bonus track: "Hero Takes a Fall" (Single Remix). In 2010, UK label Cherry Pop re-released the album with one bonus track, their cover of the Grass Roots' "Where Were You When I Needed You", which was originally released as the B-side to "Hero Takes a Fall".

== Commercial performance ==
In the US, All Over the Place spent 30 weeks on the Billboard 200 albums chart and reached its peak position of number 80 in November 1984.

== Critical reception ==
Professional ratings
Review scores
Source	Rating
AllMusic	4.5/5 stars
Number One	4/5
Rolling Stone	3.5/5 stars
The Rolling Stone Album Guide	3/5 stars
Sounds	4.5/5 stars
Spin Alternative Record Guide	8/10
The Village Voice	A−

Reviewing All Over the Place for The Village Voice in October 1984, Robert Christgau found the songs "thoroughly realized in both the writing and playing", with "familiar heart-stopping harmonies", and wrote in conclusion: "Though the style is as derivative and even retro as on EP, they don't seem to be dabbling any more. Maybe they project such confidence because they know exactly what they want to say: don't fuck me over."

Cashbox stated "the debut single from this Los Angeles—based all female combo displays a lyrical intelligence while capturing a musical sound appealing to both album oriented and hit radio formats. Forget about comparisons to that other girl group, the Bangles have forged a unique, commercially satisfying sound. Susanna Hoff’s straight ahead vocals backed by Vicki Peterson’s guitar artistry produce a down to earth rock and roll cut sure to find its way on to summer playlists."

AllMusic's Mark Deming deemed All Over the Place "easily their best and most satisfying LP" in retrospect, noting that "it's the record that most openly embraces the folk-rock and garage rock influences that fueled their earliest music ... Susanna Hoffs hadn't yet been singled out as the star of the show, and the round-robin lead vocals, stellar harmonies, and tight, concise arrangements make them sound like a real-deal rock band."

== Track listing ==
No.	Title	Writer(s)	Lead vocals	Length
1.	"Hero Takes a Fall"	Susanna Hoffs, Vicki Peterson	Hoffs	2:54
2.	"Live" (cover of the Merry-Go-Round, 1967)	Emitt Rhodes	Debbi Peterson	2:36
3.	"James"	V. Peterson	Hoffs	2:36
4.	"All About You"	V. Peterson	V. Peterson	2:26
5.	"Dover Beach"	Hoffs, V. Peterson	Hoffs	3:48
6.	"Tell Me"	Hoffs, V. Peterson	Hoffs and V. Peterson	2:15
7.	"Restless"	Hoffs, V. Peterson	V. Peterson	2:41
8.	"Going Down to Liverpool" (cover of Katrina and the Waves, 1983)	Kimberley Rew	D. Peterson	3:41
9.	"He's Got a Secret"	V. Peterson	Hoffs	2:42
10.	"Silent Treatment"	V. Peterson	V. Peterson	2:07
11.	"More Than Meets the Eye"	V. Peterson	V. Peterson and D. Peterson	3:19

== Personnel ==
The Bangles

- Susanna Hoffs – rhythm guitar, lead and backing vocals
- Vicki Peterson – lead guitar, lead and backing vocals
- Debbi Peterson – drums, lead and backing vocals
- Michael Steele – bass guitar, backing vocals

Guest musician

- Jimmie Haskell – string arrangement on "More Than Meets the Eye"

== Production ==
- Producer and Engineer – David Kahne
- Additional Engineering – Andrew Berliner
- Mixing – Joe Chiccarelli
- Mastered by Jack Skinner at Sterling Sound (New York, NY)
- Art Direction – Nancy Donald and Tony Lane
- Inner Sleeve Collage Design – Pete Lamson
- Collage Photography – Ed Colver, Mike Condello, Terry Dorn, Bruce Kalberg, Pete Lamson, Larry Rodriguez, Jeffrey Scales and Bob Seidemann

== Charts ==
Chart performance for All Over the Place
Chart (1984–1985)	Peak position
New Zealand Albums (RMNZ)	32
Swedish Albums (Sverigetopplistan)	40
UK Albums (Official Charts)	86
US Billboard 200	80
US Cash Box Top 200 Albums	64
