= Vicki Peterson =

American musician

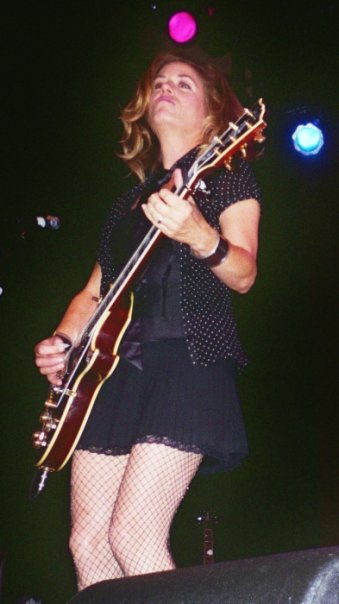
- Vicki Peterson performing with the Bangles at The House of Blues in Cleveland, Ohio, on August 30, 2007

Background information
- Born: Victoria Anne Theresa Peterson; January 11, 1958 (age 68)
- Origin: Northridge, Los Angeles, California, U.S.
- Genres: Punk rock; pop rock; pop
- Occupations: Musician; songwriter; producer
- Instruments: Vocals; guitar; bass guitar; mandolin
- Years active: 1976–present
- Member of: The Bangles
- Formerly of: Continental Drifters; Psycho Sisters; Action Skulls

Victoria Anne Theresa Cowsill (née Peterson, born January 11, 1958) is an American rock musician and songwriter. She has been the lead guitarist for the Bangles since their founding in 1981. After their first disbandment in 1989, she has returned to the band for all subsequent reunions. In intervening years, she has performed with other artists, most extensively with the Continental Drifters.

== Early life ==
Peterson described herself as a solo artist in her early years – "I was a kid who brought her guitar to every sleep-over and summer afternoon in the park to play her newest creation to anyone who would listen…" In high school she formed a band that went through various incarnations as Crista Galli, Aishi, the Muze, the Fans, and Those Girls from 1976 to 1980.

== Music career ==
In 1981, she founded the Bangs, later renamed the Bangles, with her sister Debbi Peterson and Susanna Hoffs.

After the Bangles disbanded in 1989, Peterson played with the Continental Drifters and the Psycho Sisters, in both cases with Susan Cowsill. In addition to performing their own material, the Psycho Sisters freelanced as backing singers (Steve Wynn's Fluorescent, Giant Sand's Center of the Universe), and Peterson has contributed harmony vocals to recordings by the Hoodoo Gurus, John Doe, Tom Petty and Belinda Carlisle. Additionally, she filled in for a pregnant Charlotte Caffey on the 1994–1995 Go-Go's reunion tour. In 1999 the Bangles reformed and have recorded and played sporadically.

Peterson married musician John Cowsill, brother of her Continental Drifters and Psycho Sisters bandmate Susan Cowsill, on October 25, 2003. The couple have no children together. An earlier relationship had ended when her fiancé Bobby Donati died of leukemia in 1991.

Peterson lived for several years in New Orleans before relocating back to Los Angeles.

In August 2014, after playing together as the Psycho Sisters for more than 20 years, Peterson and Susan Cowsill released their first album, titled Up on the Chair, Beatrice. In 2017, she and John Cowsill joined Bill Mumy as the band Action Skulls to release an album (also including posthumous contributions from the bassist Rick Rosas) titled Angels Hear.

== Gear ==
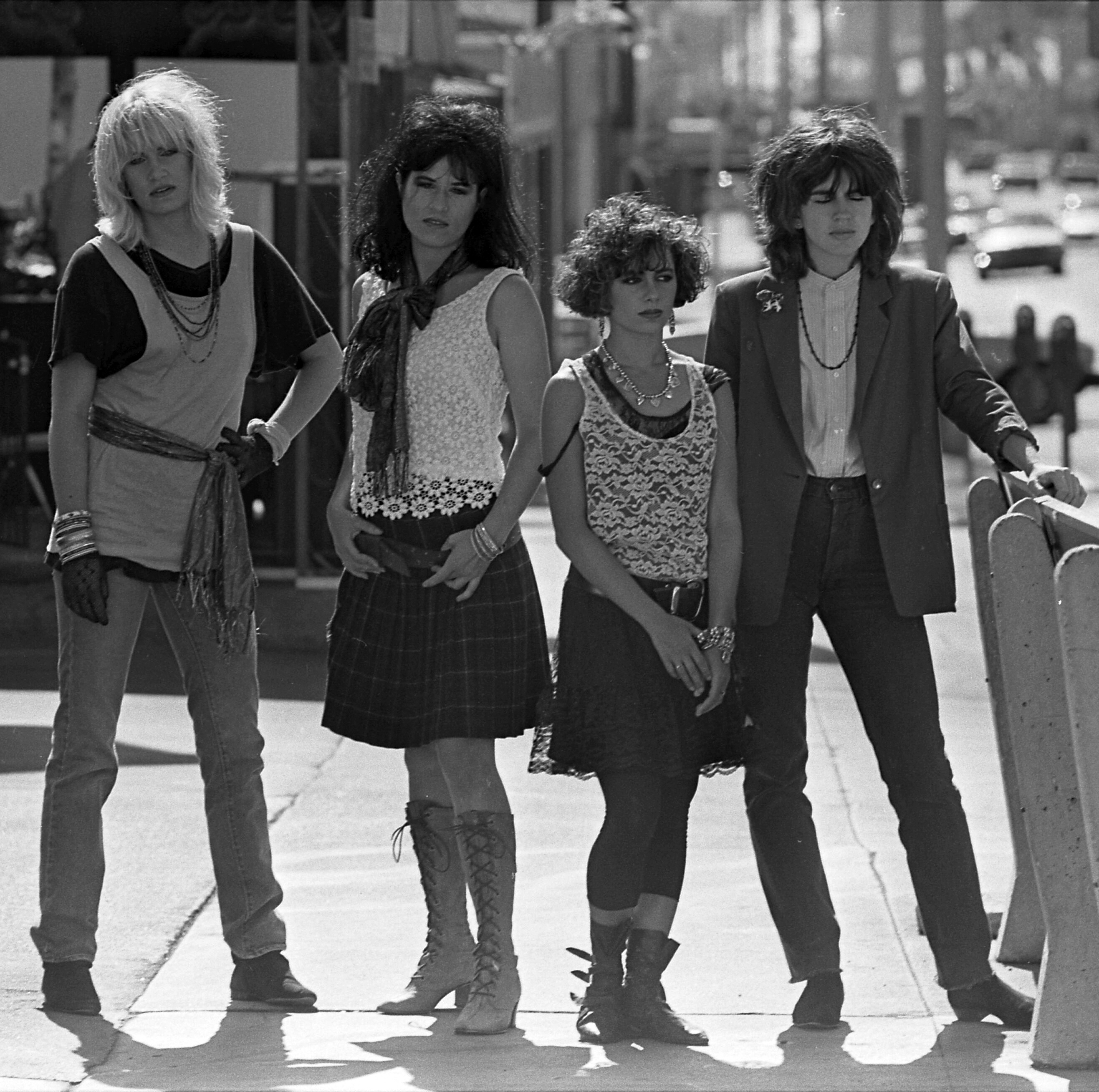
Debbi Peterson, Vicki Peterson, Susanna Hoffs and Michael Steele (1984)

Vicki Peterson's first guitar was a plastic guitar from Sears. She "got serious" when, at age nine, she became the proud owner of an Electro ES-17 guitar and an 8-watt Rickenbacker amplifier. Her next few guitars were a double cutaway Univox Ripper, a 1972 Gibson Les Paul Custom and a 1967 Fender Stratocaster, which she used on many of the Bangles early recordings. She has also been known to use Carvin guitars and amps, and by the time the Bangles reformed, Peterson also used a Gibson mandolin, a pink Fender Telecaster Thinline, several Daisy Rock Girl Guitars, and Gretsch guitars. When her 72 Les Paul Custom was stolen, Peterson eventually replaced it with a burgundy Les Paul Custom.

Peterson's primary amps were Carvin amps, as well as a Marshall combo, a Fender Twin, a 1965 Fender Deluxe Reverb, and a Fender Super Reverb, but as for pedals, she used an Ibanez Tube Screamer. She lists among her influences Paul Simon, Bonnie Raitt, Joni Mitchell, George Harrison, and Nancy Wilson.
