= 1986 in music =

This is a list of notable events in music that took place in the year 1986.

== Specific locations ==
- 1986 in British music
- 1986 in Japanese music
- 1986 in Norwegian music
- 1986 in Scandinavian music

== Specific genres ==
- 1986 in country music
- 1986 in heavy metal music
- 1986 in hip-hop
- 1986 in jazz
- 1986 in progressive rock

== Events ==
- January 30 – The Rock and Roll Hall of Fame in Cleveland, Ohio, holds its first induction ceremony with many rock pioneers attending.
- February 25
  - The 28th Annual Grammy Awards are presented in Los Angeles, hosted by Kenny Rogers. Phil Collins' No Jacket Required wins Album of the Year, while USA for Africa's "We Are the World" wins both Record of the Year and Song of the Year. Sade win Best New Artist.
  - Also, Whitney Houston wins her first GRAMMY award which she won the Best Pop Vocal Performance, Female.
- March 8 – After almost a year, Houston's debut album topped the charts and remained for 7 weeks, followed by another on May 17.
- May 3 – The 31st Eurovision Song Contest, held in Bergen, Norway, is won by Belgium with the song "J'aime la vie", performed by Sandra Kim. At 13 years old, Kim is the youngest-ever Eurovision winner.
- May 28 – The Monkees held a press conference at the Hard Rock Cafe in New York City to announce officially that they will embark on a 100-plus city tour. The tour became one of the biggest grossing tours of the year.
- June 10 – Bob Geldof is awarded an honorary UK knighthood in recognition of his work in organizing Live Aid and other concerts that raised millions of dollars for the starving people of Africa.
- June 15
  - The final show of the A Conspiracy of Hope benefit concert – organized by Amnesty International – took place at the Giants Stadium in East Rutherford, New Jersey. The show was headlined by U2, Sting, and Bryan Adams, and also features Peter Gabriel, Lou Reed, Joan Baez, and The Neville Brothers.
  - Also, The Police would perform one last time on stage during the show before disbanding that same year.
- June 30 – Madonna releases her "True Blue" album, which tops the charts in over 28 countries and becomes the best selling album of 1986.
- August 9 – Queen performed the band's final concert of the Magic Tour at Knebworth Park, which would be the last performance of the band with singer Freddie Mercury and bassist John Deacon. Later Mercury would be diagnosed with AIDS in 1987, dying in 1991, and Deacon would retire from the band in 1997.
- September 27 – A tour bus carrying the heavy metal band Metallica crashes in Sweden, killing their influential bassist, Cliff Burton.
- October – Popular music magazine Q is launched in the United Kingdom.
- November 15 – The 15th OTI Festival, held at the Municipal Theatre in Santiago, Chile, is won by the song "Todos", written by Vilma Planas, and performed by Dámaris Carbaugh, Miguel Ángel Guerra, and Eduardo Fabián representing the United States.
- November 17–18 – Billy Eckstine makes his final recordings, later released on his album Billy Eckstine Sings with Benny Carter.
- December 12 – The Smiths play Brixton Academy, the last gig before their dissolution.
- Approximate date – Axé (music) originates in Salvador, Bahia, Brazil.

== Bands formed ==
- See Musical groups established in 1986

== Bands disbanded ==
- See Musical groups disestablished in 1986

== Albums released ==
=== January ===
| Day | Album | Artist | Notes |
|---|---|---|---|
| 1 | Atomizer | Big Black | - |
| 1 | New Trails | Riders in the Sky | - |
| 13 | Different Light | The Bangles | US |
| 14 | Rich Mullins | Rich Mullins | Debut |
| 18 | Made to Be Broken | Soul Asylum | - |
| 20 | Seventh Star | Black Sabbath | US |
| 21 | Fight to Survive | White Lion | Debut/Japan |
| 21 | The Eyeball Show (Live In Japan) | The Residents & Snakefinger | - |
| 27 | Album | Public Image Ltd. | - |
| 27 | Does Humor Belong in Music? | Frank Zappa | Live |
| 27 | Premonition | Peter Frampton | - |
| ? | The Best of 10 Years – 32 Superhits | Boney M. | UK |
| ? | Gap Band 8 | The Gap Band | - |
| ? | Marilyn Martin | Marilyn Martin | Debut |
| ? | Ride the Tiger | Yo La Tengo | Debut |
| ? | Tuff Enuff | The Fabulous Thunderbirds | - |

=== February ===
| Day | Album | Artist | Notes |
|---|---|---|---|
| 1 | The Big Picture | Michael W. Smith | - |
| 3 | Mean Business | The Firm | - |
| 4 | Control | Janet Jackson | - |
| 10 | Live in New York City | John Lennon | Live 1972 |
| 10 | The Ultimate Sin | Ozzy Osbourne | UK |
| 12 | Juice | Oran "Juice" Jones | - |
| 13 | Clairvoyance | Screaming Trees | Debut |
| 13 | Precious Moments | Jermaine Jackson | - |
| 17 | The Colour of Spring | Talk Talk | - |
| 17 | Fatal Portrait | King Diamond | - |
| 17 | Strange Behavior | Animotion | - |
| 18 | Lives in the Balance | Jackson Browne | - |
| 21 | King of America | Elvis Costello | - |
| 24 | Finyl Vinyl | Rainbow | Live/Studio |
| 28 | Pretty In Pink | Various Artists | Soundtrack |
| 28 | Greed | Swans | - |
| ? | Cinema | Nazareth | - |
| ? | Kaleidoscope World | The Chills | - |
| ? | Samhain III: November-Coming-Fire | Samhain | - |
| ? | War Games | Grave Digger | - |

=== March ===
| Day | Album | Artist | Notes |
|---|---|---|---|
| 3 | Balance of Power | Electric Light Orchestra | - |
| 3 | Girls Like Me | Tanya Tucker | - |
| 3 | Master of Puppets | Metallica | - |
| 5 | Guitar Town | Steve Earle | - |
| 11 | Headed for the Future | Neil Diamond | - |
| 12 | Twitch | Ministry | - |
| 14 | Rrröööaaarrr | Voivod | - |
| 17 | Black Celebration | Depeche Mode | - |
| 17 | Candy Apple Grey | Hüsker Dü | - |
| 19 | Who's Got the 10½? | Black Flag | - |
| 20 | Rapture | Anita Baker | - |
| 24 | 5150 | Van Halen | - |
| 24 | Dirty Work | The Rolling Stones | - |
| 24 | Please | Pet Shop Boys | Debut |
| 24 | The Secret Value of Daydreaming | Julian Lennon | - |
| 24 | Big World | Joe Jackson | Live |
| 27 | Innocent Eyes | Graham Nash | - |
| 27 | Like a Rock | Bob Seger and the Silver Bullet Band | - |
| 31 | Parade | Prince and the Revolution | - |
| ? | 9½ Weeks | Various Artists | Soundtrack |
| ? | Born Sandy Devotional | The Triffids | - |
| ? | Gut Level Music | Altar Boys | - |
| ? | Liberty Belle and the Black Diamond Express | The Go-Betweens | - |
| ? | Little Miss Dangerous | Ted Nugent | - |
| ? | Matt Bianco | Matt Bianco | - |
| ? | Monster Walks the Winter Lake | David Thomas & The Wooden Birds | - |
| ? | The Pack Is Back | Raven | - |
| ? | Shot in the Dark | Great White | - |

=== April ===
| Day | Album | Artist | Notes |
|---|---|---|---|
| 1 | Rendez-Vous | Jean Michel Jarre | - |
| 1 | From Luxury to Heartache | Culture Club | - |
| 1 | Book of Love | Book of Love | Debut |
| 1 | New Kids on the Block | New Kids on the Block | Debut |
| 7 | Absolute Beginners | Various Artists | Soundtrack |
| 7 | Animal Magic | The Blow Monkeys | - |
| 7 | Getting the Holy Ghost Across | Bill Nelson | - |
| 7 | Human Frailty | Hunters & Collectors | - |
| 7 | Secret Dreams and Forbidden Fire | Bonnie Tyler | US |
| 7 | Turbo | Judas Priest | UK |
| 14 | In Visible Silence | Art of Noise | - |
| 14 | Victorialand | Cocteau Twins | - |
| 16 | Love & Hope & Sex & Dreams | BoDeans | - |
| 18 | Rembrandt Pussyhorse | Butthole Surfers | - |
| 21 | Raised on Radio | Journey | - |
| 21 | The Other Side of Life | The Moody Blues | - |
| 21 | Russian Roulette | Accept | - |
| 21 | Tinderbox | Siouxsie and the Banshees | - |
| 24 | The Way It Is | Bruce Hornsby & the Range | Debut |
| 24 | GTR | GTR | US |
| 24 | Back in Black | Whodini | - |
| 28 | Winner in You | Patti LaBelle | - |
| 28 | Truthdare Doubledare | Bronski Beat | - |
| 30 | The Final Frontier | Keel | - |
| ? | Classics Live I and II | Aerosmith | Live |
| ? | Cocker | Joe Cocker | - |
| ? | Mistrial | Lou Reed | - |
| ? | Big & Beautiful | Fat Boys | - |
| ? | Cendres de Lune | Mylène Farmer | - |
| ? | Ship of Fools | Tuxedomoon | - |
| ? | Strength in Numbers | 38 Special | - |
| ? | Measure for Measure | Icehouse | - |

=== May ===
| Day | Album | Artist | Notes |
|---|---|---|---|
| 5 | Poolside | Nu Shooz | - |
| 6 | Love Zone | Billy Ocean | - |
| 7 | Tom Cochrane & Red Rider | Red Rider | - |
| 12 | Sleight of Hand | Joan Armatrading | - |
| 15 | Top Gun | Various Artists | Soundtrack |
| 15 | Standing on a Beach | The Cure | Compilation |
| 19 | Animal Boy | The Ramones | - |
| 19 | So | Peter Gabriel | - |
| 19 | Walkabout | The Fixx | US |
| 23 | Look What the Cat Dragged In | Poison | Debut |
| 23 | Out of the Grey | The Dream Syndicate | - |
| 26 | The Final Countdown | Europe | - |
| 26 | Who Made Who | AC/DC | Soundtrack |
| 26 | Home of the Brave | Laurie Anderson | Soundtrack |
| 27 | Into the Light | Chris de Burgh | - |
| 27 | Raising Hell | Run-D.M.C. | - |
| ? | C86 | Various Artists | Cassette Compilation |
| ? | Cause for Alarm | Agnostic Front | - |
| ? | Evol | Sonic Youth | - |
| ? | Live In Brussels 02/1986 | Blaine L. Reininger | Live |
| ? | Melvins | Melvins | Debut/EP |
| ? | Moonlight Shadows | The Shadows | - |
| ? | Nightmare at Maple Cross | Girlschool | - |
| ? | Obsessed by Cruelty | Sodom | Debut album |

=== June ===
| Day | Album | Artist | Notes |
|---|---|---|---|
| 2 | A Kind of Magic | Queen | - |
| 2 | Intermission | Dio | Live |
| 2 | Emerson, Lake & Powell | Emerson, Lake & Powell | - |
| 2 | Storms of Life | Randy Travis | - |
| 2 | Wonderland | Erasure | Debut |
| 3 | Belinda | Belinda Carlisle | Debut |
| 5 | Afternoons in Utopia | Alphaville | - |
| 6 | Invisible Touch | Genesis | - |
| 9 | Night Songs | Cinderella | Debut |
| 10 | Epicus Doomicus Metallicus | Candlemass | Debut |
| 11 | The Thin Red Line | Glass Tiger | - |
| 13 | Criminal Tango | Manfred Mann's Earth Band | - |
| 16 | Change of Address | Krokus | - |
| 16 | The Queen Is Dead | The Smiths | - |
| 20 | Bring on the Night | Sting | Live |
| 23 | Bambini Forever | Righeira | - |
| 23 | Every Beat of My Heart | Rod Stewart | - |
| 23 | Labyrinth soundtrack | David Bowie, Trevor Jones | Soundtrack |
| 23 | Solitude/Solitaire | Peter Cetera | - |
| 24 | Time's Incinerator | Soul Asylum | - |
| 27 | Music from the Edge of Heaven | Wham! | US |
| 27 | Rage for Order | Queensrÿche | - |
| 27 | This Is the Voice | Agent Orange | - |
| 30 | True Blue | Madonna | - |
| 30 | The Seer | Big Country | - |
| 30 | Revenge | Eurythmics | - |
| 30 | The Divine Punishment | Diamanda Galás | - |
| 30 | Fight for the Rock | Savatage | - |
| 30 | The Twelve Inch Mixes | Spandau Ballet | Compilation |
| 30 | True Confessions | Bananarama | - |
| ? | As Close as You Think | Kevin Ayers | - |
| ? | Back in the High Life | Steve Winwood | - |
| ? | If You Swear, You'll Catch No Fish | SNFU | - |
| ? | Floridays | Jimmy Buffett | - |
| ? | Frantic Romantic | Jermaine Stewart | - |
| ? | Daring Adventures | Richard Thompson | - |
| ? | Gift | The Sisterhood | - |
| ? | Home and Abroad | The Style Council | Live |
| ? | Let the Snakes Crinkle Their Heads to Death | Felt | - |
| ? | London 0 Hull 4 | The Housemartins | - |
| ? | Giant | The Woodentops | - |

=== July ===
| Day | Album | Artist | Notes |
|---|---|---|---|
| 7 | The Final | Wham! | Compilation + New Songs |
| 7 | Eat 'Em and Smile | David Lee Roth | Solo debut |
| 7 | Made in U.S.A. | The Beach Boys | Compilation |
| 7 | Oh, My God! | Doug E. Fresh | Debut |
| 7 | Touch Me | Samantha Fox | Debut |
| 14 | Knocked Out Loaded | Bob Dylan | - |
| 14 | Communards | Communards | - |
| 21 | Orgasmatron | Motörhead | - |
| 21 | Landing on Water | Neil Young | - |
| 22 | The Collection | Amy Grant | Compilation |
| 22 | Emerald City | Teena Marie | - |
| 22 | Word Up! | Cameo | - |
| 25 | The Bridge | Billy Joel | - |
| 25 | The 2 Live Crew Is What We Are | 2 Live Crew | - |
| 25 | Lightning Strikes | Loudness | - |
| 28 | Lifes Rich Pageant | R.E.M. | - |
| 28 | Rat in the Kitchen | UB40 | - |
| 28 | Stutter | James | - |
| 28 | Flaunt It | Sigue Sigue Sputnik | - |
| 29 | Color in Your Life | Missing Persons | - |
| ? | QR III | Quiet Riot | - |
| ? | Destiny | Chaka Khan | - |
| ? | 54–40 | 54–40 | - |
| ? | East of Midnight | Gordon Lightfoot | - |
| ? | Montana Cafe | Hank Williams Jr. | - |
| ? | No Guru, No Method, No Teacher | Van Morrison | - |
| ? | Recognize No Authority | Détente | Debut |
| ? | Should the World Fail to Fall Apart | Peter Murphy | - |
| ? | Sound of Confusion | Spacemen 3 | - |
| ? | Then & Now... The Best of The Monkees | The Monkees | Compilation + 3 new recordings |

=== August ===
| Day | Album | Artist | Notes |
|---|---|---|---|
| 1 | Crowded House | Crowded House | Debut |
| 4 | Designer Beatnik | Dr Calculus | - |
| 5 | Dancing on the Ceiling | Lionel Richie | - |
| 11 | Now That's What I Call Music 7 | Various Artists | - |
| 13 | Feel My Power | MC Hammer | - |
| 18 | ABBA Live | ABBA | Live |
| 18 | Kicking Against the Pricks | Nick Cave and the Bad Seeds | - |
| 18 | Silk & Steel | Five Star | - |
| 18 | Slippery When Wet | Bon Jovi | - |
| 18 | True as Steel | Warlock | - |
| 19 | Guitars, Cadillacs, Etc., Etc. | Dwight Yoakam | - |
| 20 | Fahrenheit | Toto | - |
| 20 | Fore! | Huey Lewis and the News | - |
| 21 | Dangerous Games | Alcatrazz | - |
| 25 | Baby, the Stars Shine Bright | Everything but the Girl | - |
| 25 | The Big Lad in the Windmill | It Bites | Debut |
| 25 | Graceland | Paul Simon | - |
| 25 | Press to Play | Paul McCartney | US |
| 25 | While the City Sleeps... | George Benson | - |
| 29 | In the Army Now | Status Quo | - |
| ? | The Sport of Kings | Triumph | - |
| ? | Three Hearts in the Happy Ending Machine | Daryl Hall | - |
| ? | Camper Van Beethoven | Camper Van Beethoven | - |
| ? | Vinnie Vincent Invasion | Vinnie Vincent Invasion | - |
| ? | High Priest of Love | Zodiac Mindwarp | EP |
| ? | In the Pines | The Triffids | - |
| ? | Nasty Nasty | Black 'N Blue | - |

=== September ===
| Day | Album | Artist | Notes |
|---|---|---|---|
| 1 | Gone to Earth | David Sylvian | - |
| 1 | Reivax au Bongo | Hector Zazou | - |
| 1 | Strange Times | The Chameleons | - |
| 2 | Emotional | Jeffrey Osborne | - |
| 5 | Mind: The Perpetual Intercourse | Skinny Puppy | - |
| 8 | Break Every Rule | Tina Turner | - |
| 8 | Bouncing off the Satellites | The B-52's | - |
| 8 | Crash | The Human League | - |
| 15 | True Colors | Cyndi Lauper | - |
| 15 | True Stories | Talking Heads | - |
| 15 | Blood & Chocolate | Elvis Costello and the Attractions | - |
| 15 | Express | Love and Rockets | - |
| 15 | This Side of Paradise | Ric Ocasek | - |
| 15 | Sub Pop 100 | Various Artists | Compilation |
| 19 | Give Me the Reason | Luther Vandross | - |
| 20 | Throwing Muses | Throwing Muses | Debut |
| 22 | Blind Before I Stop | Meat Loaf | - |
| 22 | Constrictor | Alice Cooper | - |
| 22 | Filigree & Shadow | This Mortal Coil | - |
| 22 | Talking with the Taxman About Poetry | Billy Bragg | - |
| 24 | Third Stage | Boston | - |
| 24 | Dancing Undercover | Ratt | - |
| 25 | Peace Sells... but Who's Buying? | Megadeth | - |
| 26 | Vigilante | Magnum | - |
| 29 | Somewhere in Time | Iron Maiden | - |
| 29 | Blah-Blah-Blah | Iggy Pop | - |
| 29 | Brotherhood | New Order | - |
| 29 | Chicago 18 | Chicago | - |
| 29 | The Pacific Age | Orchestral Manoeuvres in the Dark | - |
| 29 | Bend Sinister | The Fall | - |
| ? | Another View | The Velvet Underground | Outtakes compilation |
| ? | The Age of Quarrel | Cro-Mags | - |
| ? | Back to the Street | Petra | - |
| ? | Duotones | Kenny G | - |
| ? | Fields of Fire | Corey Hart | - |
| ? | Forever Breathes the Lonely Word | Felt | - |
| ? | Menace to Society | Lizzy Borden | - |
| ? | Music That You Can Dance To | Sparks | - |

=== October ===
| Day | Album | Artist | Notes |
|---|---|---|---|
| 1 | Eye of the Zombie | John Fogerty | - |
| 2 | Whites Off Earth Now!! | Cowboy Junkies | Debut album |
| 6 | The Dark | Metal Church | - |
| 6 | The Lace | Benjamin Orr | - |
| 6 | Scoundrel Days | A-ha | - |
| 7 | Lovers | Babyface | Debut |
| 7 | United | Commodores | - |
| 13 | Count Three & Pray | Berlin | - |
| 13 | Rock the Nations | Saxon | - |
| 13 | Running the Endless Mile | John Parr | - |
| 13 | One to One | Howard Jones | - |
| 13 | U-Vox | Ultravox | - |
| 14 | Mosaic | Wang Chung | - |
| 17 | Better Than Heaven | Stacy Q | - |
| 20 | Reign in Blood | Slayer | - |
| 20 | Liverpool | Frankie Goes To Hollywood | - |
| 20 | Get Close | The Pretenders | - |
| 20 | Between Two Fires | Paul Young | - |
| 20 | Whiplash Smile | Billy Idol | - |
| 20 | Whispering Jack | John Farnham | Australia |
| 20 | Crimson Glory | Crimson Glory | Debut |
| 21 | Inside the Electric Circus | W.A.S.P. | - |
| 21 | Polka Party! | "Weird Al" Yankovic | - |
| 21 | Stars & Hank Forever! | The Residents | - |
| 23 | Hot Together | Pointer Sisters | - |
| 24 | Radio Musicola | Nik Kershaw | - |
| 24 | To Hell with the Devil | Stryper | - |
| 27 | Aretha | Aretha Franklin | - |
| 27 | Dreamtime | The Stranglers | - |
| 27 | Skylarking | XTC | - |
| 27 | Strange Charm | Gary Numan | - |
| 27 | No. 10, Upping St. | Big Audio Dynamite | - |
| 28 | Power | Kansas | - |
| 31 | Beyond the Gates | Possessed | - |
| 31 | Pearls of Passion | Roxette | Canada, Sweden Only Release |
| 31 | Trick or Treat | Fastway | Soundtrack |
| ? | Trilogy | Yngwie Malmsteen | - |
| ? | Alive and Screamin' | Krokus | Live |
| ? | Can't Hold Back | Eddie Money | - |
| ? | Fame and Fortune | Bad Company | - |
| ? | Greetings from Timbuk3 | Timbuk3 | - |
| ? | Repossessed | Kris Kristofferson | - |
| ? | Shake You Down | Gregory Abbott | - |

=== November ===
| Day | Album | Artist | Notes |
|---|---|---|---|
| 3 | Another Step | Kim Wilde | - |
| 3 | Christmas with The Jets | The Jets | Christmas |
| 3 | Forever | Kool & the Gang | - |
| 3 | Leather Jackets | Elton John | - |
| 3 | Menlove Ave. | John Lennon | - |
| 3 | Your Funeral... My Trial | Nick Cave and the Bad Seeds | - |
| 4 | They Might Be Giants | They Might Be Giants | Debut |
| 5 | Raw, Uncut and X-Rated | Too Short | - |
| 10 | The Whole Story | Kate Bush | Compilation + 2 new tracks |
| 10 | The Moon and the Melodies | Cocteau Twins and Harold Budd | - |
| 10 | Live/1975–85 | Bruce Springsteen and The E Street Band | Live Box Set |
| 10 | Brighter Than a Thousand Suns | Killing Joke | - |
| 10 | Morbid Visions | Sepultura | - |
| 10 | God's Own Medicine | The Mission (band) | - |
| 11 | Heartbeat | Don Johnson | |
| 15 | Jazz from Hell | Frank Zappa | - |
| 15 | Licensed to Ill | Beastie Boys | - |
| 15 | Live Alive | Stevie Ray Vaughan | Live |
| 15 | Rockbird | Debbie Harry | - |
| 17 | Darkness Descends | Dark Angel | - |
| 17 | Disco | Pet Shop Boys | Remix |
| 17 | Infected | The The | - |
| 17 | Saint of the Pit | Diamanda Galás | - |
| 17 | Strong Persuader | Robert Cray | - |
| 17 | Think Visual | The Kinks | - |
| 17 | Through the Barricades | Spandau Ballet | - |
| 20 | Holy Money | Swans | - |
| 21 | I Against I | Bad Brains | - |
| 24 | Notorious | Duran Duran | - |
| 24 | August | Eric Clapton | - |
| 24 | Deep in the Heart of Nowhere | Bob Geldof | - |
| 24 | Utter Madness | Madness | Compilation |
| 24 | Now That's What I Call Music 8 | Various Artists | - |
| ? | The 20 Greatest Christmas Songs | Boney M. | Compilation/Remix |
| ? | 3.V | Zebra | - |
| ? | Big Sexy Land | Revolting Cocks | - |
| ? | Burl | Killdozer | - |
| ? | Chronicle, Vol. 2 | Creedence Clearwater Revival | - |
| ? | The Doctor | Cheap Trick | - |
| ? | Famous Blue Raincoat | Jennifer Warnes | Canada |
| ? | In Your Face | Fishbone | Debut |
| ? | Medusa | Clan of Xymox | - |
| ? | No More the Fool | Elkie Brooks | - |
| ? | Pleasure to Kill | Kreator | - |
| ? | Shelter | Lone Justice | - |

=== December ===
| Day | Album | Artist | Notes |
|---|---|---|---|
| 1 | Live Magic | Queen | Live |
| 1 | Anything | The Damned | - |
| 1 | Planet Rock: The Album | Afrika Bambaataa & Soulsonic Force | - |
| 6 | Gang | Johnny Hallyday | - |
| 8 | Hot, Cool & Vicious | Salt-N-Pepa | - |
| 8 | Mechanical Resonance | Tesla | - |
| 9 | Good Music | Joan Jett and the Blackhearts | - |
| 15 | Charlotte for Ever | Charlotte Gainsbourg | - |
| 16 | Electric Café | Kraftwerk | - |
| 16 | Live ?!*@ Like a Suicide | Guns N' Roses | Live EP |
| ? | Eine kleine Nachtmusik | Venom | Live |
| ? | Mad, Bad and Dangerous to Know | Dead or Alive | US |

=== Release date unknown ===
- 1936, The Spanish Revolution – The Ex
- 22B3 – Device
- Awaken the Guardian – Fates Warning
- Back in Line – Steeleye Span
- Back to the Street – Petra
- Ballad of a Thin Line Man – Giant Sand
- Bares y Fondas – Los Fabulosos Cadillacs
- Between the Earth & Sky – Luba
- The Big Heat - Stan Ridgway
- Big Night Music - Shriekback
- Big Plans for Everybody - Let's Active
- The Big Shot Chronicles - Game Theory
- The Blind Leading the Naked – Violent Femmes
- Bloodgood – Bloodgood
- Boys Don't Cry – Boys Don't Cry
- BTO's Greatest – Bachman–Turner Overdrive
- Captured in Time and Space – Petra
- Certain Things Are Likely – Kissing the Pink
- Chasing Shadows – The Comsat Angels
- The Circle & The Square – Red Box
- Concrete Blonde – Concrete Blonde
- Crimson Glory – Crimson Glory
- Dangerous Dreams – The Nails
- A Date with Elvis – The Cramps
- David Foster – David Foster
- Discover – Gene Loves Jezebel
- Dreaming in Sequence – Chrome
- Don't Wait for the Movie – White Heart
- Eat Your Paisley! - The Dead Milkmen
- The Edge of the World – The Mekons
- Element of Light - Robyn Hitchcock and The Egyptians
- Emotional – Juice Newton
- Escape from the Fallen Planet – Crumbächer
- Especially for You – The Smithereens
- Friends - The Bolshoi
- Good Earth – The Feelies
- Gruts – Ivor Cutler
- Hand to Mouth – General Public
- Happy Head - The Mighty Lemon Drops
- Hey... Bo Diddley in Concert – Bo Diddley with Mainsqueeze
- Highlights of a Dangerous Life – The Johnnys
- Horse Bites Dog Cries – D.I.
- Horse Rotorvator – Coil
- House of Miracles – The Vels
- Hwgr Grawth-Og – Datblygu
- Idle Cure – Idle Cure
- In America EP – Britny Fox
- Inside – Matthew Sweet
- Isyu! – Ebiet G. Ade
- Jamboree - Guadalcanal Diary
- Journey to The Urge Within – Courtney Pine (debut)
- Keys to Imagination – Yanni
- Kings of Punk – Poison Idea
- Klymaxx – Klymaxx
- The Knife Feels Like Justice – Brian Setzer
- The Last of the True Believers – Nanci Griffith
- Le Mystère des Voix Bulgares – Le Mystère des Voix Bulgares
- Le sixième Jour – Dalida
- Le Visage de l'Amour – Dalida
- Letters Home – News from Babel
- Live Chronicles – Hawkwind
- Love in Bright Landscapes – The Triffids
- Lyle Lovett – Lyle Lovett
- Mad – Raven
- The Man – Bill Drummond
- Manic Pop Thrill - That Petrol Emotion
- Mind's Eye – Vinnie Moore
- Minuteflag – Minutemen/Black Flag
- Nerve War – Front Line Assembly
- New Grass Revival - New Grass Revival
- Nine Lives – Bonnie Raitt
- Not of This Earth – Joe Satriani
- Nowa Aleksandria – Siekiera
- Nuovi eroi – Eros Ramazzotti
- On the Beach – Chris Rea
- One Foot in Hell – Cirith Ungol
- Paint Your Wagon – Red Lorry Yellow Lorry
- People of the World – Burning Spear
- Permanent Sleep – Lowlife
- Pictures of Starving Children Sell Records – Chumbawamba
- Positively Dumptruck - Dumptruck
- Prince Ivor – Ivor Cutler
- Public Castration Is a Good Idea – Swans
- R&B Skeletons in the Closet – George Clinton
- Ragin', Full-On - fIREHOSE
- The Rainmakers – The Rainmakers
- Reconciled - The Call
- Reivax Au Bongo – Hector Zazou
- The River is Rising – Greg X. Volz
- Romeo Unchained – Tonio K
- Sex Mad – NoMeansNo
- Shakin' Like a Human Being – Kim Mitchell
- Show No Mercy – Bride
- Siempre Contigo – José José
- Songs from Liquid Days – Philip Glass
- Streetlight – DeGarmo and Key
- Stop Start – Modern English
- Tacky Souvenirs of Pre-Revolutionary America – Culturcide
- They Don't Make Them Like They Used To – Kenny Rogers
- Thrill of a Lifetime – King Kobra
- Time's End – Saint (band)
- Tones – Eric Johnson
- Total Terror – Front Line Assembly
- The Touch – Alabama
- Transit – Ira Stein and Russel Walder
- Tutu – Miles Davis
- Velvet & Steel – Dion DiMucci
- Vicious Pink – Vicious Pink
- Vicious Rumors – Timex Social Club
- Wants You – Rough Cutt
- Water from an Ancient Well – Abdullah Ibrahim
- Wear Your Colors – Rick Cua
- The Wedge – Pallas
- Weird Love – The Scientists
- Welcome Home – 'Til Tuesday
- What Price Paradise – China Crisis
- White Fields – The Escape Club
- The Wild Frontier – Randy Stonehill
- Yessir, That's My Baby – Count Basie and Oscar Peterson
- Yesterday Started Tomorrow (EP) – Angry Samoans
- Zangalewa – Golden Sounds

== Biggest hit singles ==
The following songs achieved the highest chart positions in the charts of 1986.

| # | Artist | Title | Year | Country | Chart entries |
|---|---|---|---|---|---|
| 1 | Berlin | "Take My Breath Away" | 1986 | (United States) | UK 1 - Oct 1986 (15 weeks), US Billboard 1 - Jun 1986 (21 weeks), Holland 1 - Sep 1986 (12 weeks), Sweden 1 - Sep 1986 (7 weeks), Belgium 1 - Oct 1986 (12 weeks), Eire 1 for 4 weeks - Oct 1986, Europe 1 for 4 weeks - Nov 1986, Oscar in 1986 (film 'Top Gun'), Golden Globe in 1986 (film 'Top Gun'), ASCAP song of 1986, Brazil 2 of 1986, Switzerland 2 - Oct 1986 (15 weeks), Springbok 2 - Oct 1986 (18 weeks), Germany 3 - Sep 1986 (3 months), ODK Germany 3 - Sep 1986 (18 weeks) (8 weeks in top 10), Austria 4 - Nov 1986 (4 months), Norway 4 - Oct 1986 (6 weeks), Poland 4 - Nov 1986 (9 weeks), US Gold (certified by RIAA in May 1992), UK Gold (certified by BPI in Nov 1986), Australia 6 of 1986, POP 7 of 1986, US CashBox 21 of 1986, Canada 23 of 1986, US BB 27 of 1986, ARC 28 of 1986 (peak 1 13 weeks), US Radio 29 of 1986 (peak 1 9 weeks), Italy 37 of 1986, TOTP 37, nuTsie 58 of 1980s, UKMIX 69, Scrobulate 80 of 80s, Holland free40 93 of 1986, OzNet 251, Germany 310 of the 1980s (peak 3 9 weeks), RYM 16 of 1986 |
| 2 | Falco | "Rock Me Amadeus" | 1985 | (Austria) | UK 1 - Mar 1986 (15 weeks), US Billboard 1 - Feb 1986 (17 weeks), Canada 1 - Dec 1985 (6 weeks), Sweden 1 - Aug 1985 (7 weeks), Sweden (alt) 1 - Sep 1985 (17 weeks), Austria 1 - May 1985 (6 months), Germany 1 - Jun 1985 (4 months), ODK Germany 1 - Jun 1985 (23 weeks) (4 weeks at number 1) (14 weeks in top 10), Eire 1 for 1 week - Apr 1986, Canada RPM 1 for 1 week - Feb 1986, New Zealand 1 for 5 weeks - Mar 1986, Springbok 1 - Apr 1986 (20 weeks), Europe 1 for 2 weeks - Jul 1985, Germany 1 for 4 weeks - Jul 1985, France 2 - Nov 1985 (3 weeks), Switzerland 2 - Jun 1985 (20 weeks), Belgium 2 - May 1986 (10 weeks), Holland 3 - May 1986 (9 weeks), South Africa 3 of 1986, UK Gold (certified by BPI in May 1986), Germany Gold (certified by BMieV in 1985), Switzerland 5 of 1985, Norway 6 - Apr 1986 (7 weeks), US Radio 12 of 1986 (peak 1 9 weeks), Italy 18 of 1985, US CashBox 19 of 1986, Brazil 20 of 1986, Canada 22 of 1986, Poland 24 - Jun 1985 (5 weeks), US BB 28 of 1986, POP 29 of 1986, ARC 38 of 1986 (peak 1 12 weeks), Germany 50 of the 1980s (peak 1 16 weeks), Scrobulate 65 of 80s, KROQ 74 of 1986, Holland free40 96 of 1986, RYM 63 of 1985 |
| 3 | Dionne Warwick and Friends | "That's What Friends Are For" | 1985 | (United States) (United Kingdom) | US Billboard 1 - Nov 1985 (22 weeks), US BB 1 of 1986, ARC 1 of 1986 (peak 1 15 weeks), US Radio 1 of 1986 (peak 1 12 weeks), Canada 1 - Dec 1985 (7 weeks), Canada RPM 1 for 1 week - Jan 1986, Australia 1 for 1 week - Mar 1986, POP 1 of 1986, Top Song of 1986 of the Billboard 50th list, Springbok 2 - Dec 1985 (15 weeks), Grammy in 1986 (Nominated), US Gold (certified by RIAA in Jan 1986), Norway 6 - Dec 1985 (11 weeks), Sweden (alt) 7 - Nov 1985 (7 weeks), Sweden 9 - Nov 1985 (4 weeks), Brazil 10 of 1986, Belgium 10 - Nov 1985 (5 weeks), Canada 10 of 1986, Holland 11 - Nov 1985 (9 weeks), Switzerland 11 - Dec 1985 (9 weeks), Australia 12 of 1986, UK 16 - Nov 1985 (10 weeks), South Africa 17 of 1986, US CashBox 20 of 1986, ODK Germany 36 - Jan 1986 (11 weeks), Italy 49 of 1986, Billboard 50th song 61, nuTsie 69 of 1980s, 55th Billboard 100 71 (1986), Billboard100 75, RIAA 292 |
| 4 | Madonna | "Papa Don't Preach" | 1986 | (United States) | UK 1 - Jun 1986 (15 weeks), US Billboard 1 - Jun 1986 (18 weeks), Sweden 1 - Aug 1986 (5 weeks), Norway 1 - Jul 1986 (10 weeks), Belgium 1 - Jul 1986 (12 weeks), Italy 1 of 1986, Italy 1 for 7 weeks - Jul 1986, Eire 1 for 2 weeks - Jun 1986, Canada RPM 1 for 2 weeks - Aug 1986, Australia 1 for 6 weeks - Aug 1986, Europe 1 for 11 weeks - Aug 1986, Holland 2 - Jun 1986 (13 weeks), Switzerland 2 - Jul 1986 (13 weeks), Poland 2 - Aug 1986 (18 weeks), Germany 2 - Jul 1986 (3 months), ODK Germany 2 - Jul 1986 (17 weeks) (9 weeks in top 10), Austria 4 - Aug 1986 (4 months), Springbok 4 - Sep 1986 (15 weeks), US Gold (certified by RIAA in Oct 1998), UK Gold (certified by BPI in Aug 1986), ARC 8 of 1986 (peak 1 13 weeks), Australia 9 of 1986, US Radio 10 of 1986 (peak 1 9 weeks), Canada 13 of 1986, Switzerland 14 of 1986, US CashBox 18 of 1986, US BB 29 of 1986, POP 35 of 1986, 37 in 2FM list, nuTsie 44 of 1980s, Brazil 70 of 1986, Germany 215 of the 1980s (peak 2 11 weeks), France (InfoDisc) 219 of the 1980s (peak 2, 22 weeks, 456k sales estimated, 1986), UKMIX 720, Acclaimed 761 (1986), RYM 43 of 1986 |
| 5 | The Bangles | "Walk Like an Egyptian" | 1986 | (United States) | US Billboard 1 - Sep 1986 (22 weeks), US BB 1 of 1987, Holland 1 - Nov 1986 (14 weeks), Belgium 1 - Nov 1986 (15 weeks), ODK Germany 1 - Nov 1986 (16 weeks) (4 weeks at number 1) (9 weeks in top 10), Canada RPM 1 for 1 week - Jan 1987, Australia 1 for 2 weeks - Feb 1987, Springbok 1 - Dec 1986 (19 weeks), Germany 1 for 4 weeks - Dec 1986, Top Song of 1987 of the Billboard 50th list, Germany 2 - Jan 1987 (4 months), UK 3 - Sep 1986 (21 weeks), ARC 3 of 1986 (peak 1 15 weeks), US Gold (certified by RIAA in Apr 1989), US Radio 6 of 1986 (peak 1 10 weeks), Austria 7 - Jan 1987 (3 months), Australia 7 of 1987, Switzerland 8 - Jan 1987 (8 weeks), South Africa 8 of 1987, POP 9 of 1986, Sweden 14 - Nov 1986 (2 weeks), Canada 25 of 1987, KROQ 27 of 1986, Italy 38 of 1987, Brazil 50 of 1987, Scrobulate 75 of 80s, nuTsie 86 of 1980s, Holland free40 90 of 1986, Germany 220 of the 1980s (peak 1 10 weeks), UKMIX 788, Acclaimed 2472 (1986), UK Silver (certified by BPI in Nov 1986), RYM 81 of 1986, Party 166 of 2007 |

== Top 40 Chart hit singles ==
| Song title | Artist(s) | Release date(s) | US | UK | Highest chart position | Other Chart Performance(s) |
|---|---|---|---|---|---|---|
| "Absolute Beginners" | David Bowie | March 1986 | 53 | 2 | 1 (Europe, Finland, Ireland) | See chart performance entry |
| "Addicted To Love" | Robert Palmer | January 1986 | 1 | 5 | 1 (Australia, United States) | See chart performance entry |
| "All I Ask of You" | Cliff Richard and Sarah Brightman | September 1986 | n/a | 3 | 1 (Ireland, South Africa) | 24 (Australia) |
| "All I Need Is a Miracle" | Mike + The Mechanics | February 1986 | 5 | 53 | 5 (United States) | See chart performance entry |
| "All the Things She Said" | Simple Minds | April 1986 | 28 | 9 | 4 (Ireland) | See chart performance entry |
| "Amanda" | Boston | September 1987 | 1 | 84 | 1 (Canada, United States) | See chart performance entry |

=== Other Chart hit singles ===
- "All Cried Out" – Lisa Lisa & Cult Jam (# 8 US, # 3 US Hot Black Singles)
- "Baby Love" – Regina Richards
- "Bad Boy" – Miami Sound Machine
- "Be Good to Yourself" – Journey
- "Best of Both Worlds" – Van Halen
- "Born Yesterday" – The Everly Brothers
- "Brand New Lover" – Dead or Alive
- "Breakout" – Swing Out Sister (charted in 1987 in U.S.)
- "Bigmouth Strikes Again" – The Smiths
- "Big Time" – Peter Gabriel (also charted in the U.S. in 1987)
- "Bizarre Love Triangle" – New Order
- "Brother Louie" – Modern Talking
- "Both to Each Other (Friends and Lovers)" – Juice Newton and Eddie Rabbitt
- "Burning Heart" – Survivor
- "Calling America" – Electric Light Orchestra
- "Candy" – Cameo
- "Can't Wait Another Minute" – Five Star
- "Capitaine abandonné" – Gold
- "The Captain of Her Heart" – Double (released in 1985)
- "Chain Reaction" – Diana Ross
- "Cheap Love" – Juice Newton
- "Coming Around Again" – Carly Simon (released in UK in 1987)
- "Conga" – Miami Sound Machine
- "Crush on You" – The Jets
- "Cry to Heaven" – Elton John
- "Dancing on the Ceiling" – Lionel Richie
- "Danger Zone" – Kenny Loggins
- "Don't Forget Me (When I'm Gone)" – Glass Tiger
- "Don't Stand So Close to Me '86" – The Police
- "Dreams" – Van Halen
- "The Edge of Heaven" – Wham!
- "En Rouge et Noir" – Jeanne Mas
- "Ève lève-toi" – Julie Pietri
- "Everybody Have Fun Tonight" – Wang Chung
- "The Final Countdown" – Europe
- "Flash" – Princess Stéphanie of Monaco
- "Friends and Lovers" – Gloria Loring and Carl Anderson
  - also recorded as "Both to Each Other" by country music artists Juice Newton and Eddie Rabbitt
- "French Kissin' In The USA" – Debbie Harry
- "Girl Can't Help It" – Journey
- "Glory of Love" – Peter Cetera
- "Go Home" – Stevie Wonder
- "Greatest Love of All" – Whitney Houston
- "Harlem Shuffle" – The Rolling Stones
- "Heartbeat" – Don Johnson
- "He's Back (The Man Behind the Mask)" – Alice Cooper
- "Higher Love" – Steve Winwood
- "Hip to Be Square" – Huey Lewis and the News
- "Holding Back the Years" (1985) – Simply Red (originally released in 1985)
- "Human" – Human League
- "I Can't Wait" – Nu Shooz
- "(I Just) Died In Your Arms" – Cutting Crew (charted in 1987 in the U.S.)
- "I Want to Wake Up with You" – Boris Gardiner
- "If I Say Yes" – Five Star
- "If She Knew What She Wants" – Bangles
- "If You Leave" – Orchestral Manoeuvres in the Dark
- "In the Army Now" – Status Quo
- "In Too Deep" – Genesis (charted in 1987 in the U.S.)
- "Invisible Touch" – Genesis
- "Jody" – Jermaine Stewart
- "Jumpin' Jack Flash" – Aretha Franklin
- "A Kind of Magic" – Queen
- "Keep Your Hands to Yourself" — The Georgia Satellites
- "The Kid's American" – Jermaine Stewart
- "Kiss" – Prince and the Revolution
- "Kyrie" – Mr. Mister
- "La Isla Bonita" – Madonna
- "La puerta de Alcalá" – Ana Belén and Víctor Manuel
- "The Lady in Red" – Chris de Burgh (charted in 1987 in the U.S.)
- "Land of Confusion" – Genesis
- "Le Sixième Jour" – Dalida
- "Les Bêtises" – Sabine Paturel
- "Les Démons de minuit" – Images
- "Lessons in Love" – Level 42
- "Libertine" – Mylène Farmer
- "Live to Tell" – Madonna
- "Livin' On a Prayer" – Bon Jovi (also in 1987)
- "Living In America" – James Brown
- "Living Doll" – Cliff Richard and The Young Ones featuring Hank B. Marvin
- "Locked In" – Judas Priest
- "Love Touch" – Rod Stewart
- "Love Walks In" – Van Halen
- "Mad About You" – Belinda Carlisle
- "Manic Monday" – The Bangles
- "Master of Puppets" – Metallica
- "A Matter of Trust" – Billy Joel
- "Misfit" – Curiosity Killed the Cat
- "Modern Woman" – Billy Joel
- "Mountains" – Prince
- "Move Away" – Culture Club
- "My Hometown" (1984) – Bruce Springsteen
- "Nasty" – Janet Jackson
- "Never as Good as the First Time" – Sade
- "The Next Time I Fall" – Peter Cetera and Amy Grant
- "Nikita" – Elton John
- "No One Is to Blame" (originally recorded in 1985) – Howard Jones
- "No Promises" – Icehouse
- "Nobody's Fool" – Cinderella
- "Notorious" – Duran Duran
- "Now and Forever (You and Me)" – Anne Murray
- "Old Flame" – Juice Newton
- "On My Own" – Patti LaBelle and Michael McDonald
- "Open Your Heart" – Madonna
- "Opportunities (Let's Make Lots of Money)" – Pet Shop Boys
- "Ouragan" – Princess Stéphanie of Monaco
- "Overjoyed" – Stevie Wonder
- "Papa Don't Preach" – Madonna
- "Peace Sells" – Megadeth
- "Point of No Return" – Nu Shooz
- "Pressure Down" – John Farnham
- "Pretty in Pink" – The Psychedelic Furs
- "Private Number" – The Jets
- "A Question of Lust" – Depeche Mode
- "A Question of Time" – Depeche Mode
- "¿A quién le importa?" – Alaska
- "The Rain" – Oran "Juice" Jones
- "Rain or Shine" – Five Star
- "Raining Blood" – Slayer
- "Rock Me Amadeus" – Falco
- "Rough Boy" (1985) – ZZ Top
- "The Rumour" – Jeanette Jurado and George Michael
- "Rumors" – Timex Social Club
- "Ruthless People" – Mick Jagger
- "Sara" (1985) – Starship
- "Say You Really Want Me" – Kim Wilde (North American issue)
- "Schoolgirl" – Kim Wilde
- "Showing Out (Get Fresh at the Weekend)" – Mel and Kim
- "Silent Running" (1985) – Mike + The Mechanics
- "Sledgehammer" – Peter Gabriel
- "Slice of Heaven" – Dave Dobbyn
- "Slow Rivers" – Cliff Richard and Elton John
- "Small Town" (1985) – John Cougar Mellencamp
- "So Far, So Good" – Sheena Easton
- "Something About You" (1985) – Level 42
- "Sometimes" – Erasure
- "Somewhere" – Barbra Streisand
- "Stripped" – Depeche Mode
- "Stuck with You" – Huey Lewis and the News
- "Suburbia" – Pet Shop Boys
- "Sweet Freedom" – Michael McDonald
- "Sweet Love" – Anita Baker
- "The Sweetest Taboo" (1985) – Sade
- "System Addict" – Five Star
- "Take Me Home Tonight" – Eddie Money
- "Take My Breath Away" – Berlin
- "Taken In" – Mike + The Mechanics
- "Teenage Frankenstein" – Alice Cooper
- "Tender Love" – Force MD's
- "That Was Then, This Is Now" – The Monkees
- "That's What Friends Are For" – Dionne Warwick (duets with Elton John, Gladys Knight and Stevie Wonder)
- "The Themes from 'EastEnders' and 'Howards Way'" – The Shadows
- "(There's Gonna Be) A Showdown" – The Johnnys
- "These Dreams" (1985) – Heart
- "Thorn in My Side" – Eurythmics
- "Throw Your Arms Around Me" – Hunters & Collectors
- "Throwing It All Away" – Genesis
- "Turbo Lover" – Judas Priest
- "True Blue"- Madonna
- "True Colors" – Cyndi Lauper
- "Twist and Shout" – The Beatles
- "Two People" – Tina Turner
- "Two of Hearts" – Stacey Q
- "Typical Male" – Tina Turner
- "Venus" – Bananarama
- "Voyage, voyage" – Desireless
- "Walk Like an Egyptian" – The Bangles (also in 1987)
- "Walk This Way" – Run DMC featuring Aerosmith
- "War" – Bruce Springsteen
- "Wasted Years" – Iron Maiden
- "The Way It Is" – Bruce Hornsby and the Range
- "We Don't Have to Take Our Clothes Off" – Jermaine Stewart
- "Welcome Home (Sanitarium)" – Metallica
- "We're Ready" (recorded 1981) – Boston
- "What Have You Done for Me Lately" – Janet Jackson
- "What You Need" – INXS
- "When You Gonna" – Rick Astley
- "When I Think of You" – Janet Jackson
- "Who's Johnny" – El DeBarge
- "Who Made Who" – AC/DC
- "Why Can't This Be Love" – Van Halen
- "Word Up!"- Cameo
- "Words Get in the Way" – Gloria Estefan and Miami Sound Machine
- "You Can Call Me Al" – Paul Simon
- "You Give Love a Bad Name" – Bon Jovi
- "You Got It All" – The Jets (also in 1987)
- "You Keep Me Hangin' On" – Kim Wilde (charted in the U.S. in 1987)
- "Your Love" – The Outfield
- "Your Wildest Dreams" – The Moody Blues
- "You're the Voice" – John Farnham (#1 in Australia, South Africa, and Quebec; not released in Europe until 1987, released in USA in 1990)

== Notable singles ==
| Song title | Artist(s) | Release date(s) | Other Chart Performance(s) |
|---|---|---|---|
| "Behind the Wall of Sleep" | The Smithereens | July 1986 | 8 (UK Indie Chart) – 23 (U.S. Billboard Mainstream Rock) |
| "Bigmouth Strikes Again" | The Smiths | May 1986 | 26 (UK Singles Chart) – 38 (Belgium) |
| "Wide Open Road" | The Triffids | February 1986 | 26 (UK Singles Chart) – 64 (Australia) |

=== Other Notable singles ===
- "You're So Fine" – Egyptian Lover

== Published popular music ==
- "All I Ask of You" w.m. Andrew Lloyd Webber
- "Crush On You" w.m. Jerry Knight & Aaron Zigman
- "I Used To Be An Animal, But I'm Alright Now" w.m. Eric Burdon
- "The Lady in Red" w.m. Chris de Burgh
- "True Colors" Cyndi Lauper
- Montego Bay Amazulu – a minor hit in the U.S. in September.

== Classical music ==
- Malcolm Arnold – Symphony No. 9
- Pascal Bentoiu – Symphony No. 7 ("Volume"), Op.29
- Elliott Carter – String Quartet No.4
- George Crumb – An Idyll for the Misbegotten (Images III) for amplified flute and percussion (three players).
- George Crumb – Federico's Little Songs for Children for soprano, flute/piccolo/alto flute/bass flute, and harp
- Mario Davidovsky – Salvos for flute, clarinet, harp, percussion, violin and cello
- Jacob Druckman – Reflections on the Nature of Water, for solo marimba
- Ludovico Einaudi – Movimento
- Peter Eötvös – Chinese Opera
- Morton Feldman
  - For Christian Wolff, for flute and piano/celesta
  - For Stefan Wolpe, for choir and 2 vibraphones
- Lorenzo Ferrero
  - La fuga di Foscolo
  - Anemia (film score)
  - Passacaglia, for flute, clarinet, and string quartet
  - Intermezzo "Portella della Ginestra"
  - Ninna-nanna
- Karel Goeyvaerts –
  - De Heilige Stad (The Holy City), for chamber orchestra
  - De Zeven Segels (The Seven Seals), for string quartet
- Martun Israelyan
  - Violin Concerto
  - Sonata No. 2 for cello and piano
- Wojciech Kilar – Orawa, a symphonic poem for a string orchestra
- György Kurtág – Three Ancient Inscriptions, for voice and piano
- Alvin Lucier – Hommage to James Tenney, for double bass and pure wave oscillator
- Witold Lutoslawski – Chain 3 for orchestra
- Per Nørgård
  - Viola Concerto No. 1 Remembering Child
  - Najader (The Naiads)
- Krzysztof Penderecki – The Song of Cherubin
- Paul Schoenfield – Café Music for Piano Trio

== Opera ==
- Harrison Birtwistle's opera The Mask of Orpheus is premiered in London, UK on May 21
- Rudolf Brucci – Gilgamesh
- Lorenzo Ferrero's opera Salvatore Giuliano is premiered at the Teatro dell'Opera di Roma on January 25
- Lee Hoiby – The Tempest
- Gian-Carlo Menotti – Goya
- Michael Nyman – The Man Who Mistook His Wife for a Hat

== Musical theater ==
- La Cage aux Folles – London production
- Charlie Girl – London revival
- Chess – London production
- Me and My Girl – Broadway revival
- The Phantom Of The Opera – London production
- Time (musical) – London production
- Sweet Charity – Broadway revival

== Musical films ==
- Absolute Beginners
- HMS Pinafore
- Labyrinth
- Long Da Lishkara
- Little Shop of Horrors
- Naam
- Otello
- Round Midnight

== Musical television ==
- Barnum

== Music festivals ==
- Inaugural Festival International

== Births ==
- January 1
  - Lee Sung-min, South Korean singer and actor
  - Karol Conká, Brazilian rapper and songwriter
  - Colin Morgan, Irish actor
- January 2 – Trombone Shorty, American trumpet and trombone player
- January 3 – Lloyd Polite, American singer (N-Toon)
- January 5 – Teppei Koike, Japanese singer and actor
- January 6
  - Alex Turner, English singer and guitarist (Arctic Monkeys)
  - Kenzie, English rapper, DJ, actor and personal trainer (Blazin' Squad)
- January 7
  - Megan Washington, Australian musician and singer-songwriter
  - Marcel Somerville, English rapper, DJ and record producer (Blazin' Squad)
  - Yummy Bingham, American R&B singer
- January 9 – Wengie, Chinese Australian YouTuber, vlogger, pop singer and voice actress
- January 11 – Mithoon, Indian film score composer and singer
- January 17 – Chloe Rose Lattanzi, American singer and actress
- January 16 – Nadine Shah, British singer-songwriter
- January 20
  - Victoria Asher, American keyboard player
  - Olga Buzova, Russian singer
  - Kevin Parker, Australian singer-songwriter, multi-instrumentalist and record producer (Tame Impala)
- January 21 – Kirin J. Callinan, Australian singer-songwriter and guitarist (Mercy Arms)
- January 22 – Ella Edmondson, British musician
- January 23 - Anne Foy, British television presenter
- January 24
  - Raviv Ullman, Israeli-American actor and musician
  - Katie Waissel, English singer-songwriter
- January 26
  - Hero, Korean singer (TVXQ)
  - Matt Heafy, Japenese-American singer and guitarist (Trivium)
- January 28 – Michael Paynter, Australian singer-songwriter and musician (the Veronicas, Delta Goodrem)
- February 2 – Blaine Larsen, American country singer
- February 5 – Kevin Gates, American rapper, singer-songwriter and entrepreneur
- February 6 – U-Know, Korean singer (TVXQ)
- February 8 – Anderson .Paak, American rapper, singer-songwriter, record producer and drummer
- February 11 – Hudson Mohawke, Scottish producer, composer and DJ
- February 14 – Tiffany Thornton, American actress
- February 15 – Amber Riley, American actress, stage performer, singer and author
- February 16 - Josje Huisman, Dutch singer (K3)
- February 19 – Maria Mena, Norwegian singer
- February 21 – Charlotte Church, Welsh singer-songwriter, activist and actress
- February 23 – Skylar Grey, American singer-songwriter
- February 25 – Danny Saucedo, Swedish singer
- February 26
  - Crystal Kay, Japanese singer-songwriter, radio host and actress
  - Juliet Simms, American singer-songwriter and model (front woman of Automatic Loveletter)
  - Oscar Holter, a Swedish record producer and songwriter based in the United States (Taylor Swift, Charli XCX, Hailee Steinfeld, The Weeknd)
- February 27 – Ashthon Jones, American singer
- March 3 – Stacie Orrico, American singer-songwriter and occasional actress
- March 4 – Saif Nabeel, Iraq singer
- March 6
  - Ginny Blackmore, New Zealand singer-songwriter
  - Maya Postepski, Canadian musician and producer
- March 9
  - Brittany Snow, American actress, producer and singer
  - Young Fyre, American record producer (Britney Spears, Tech N9ne, Jaden Smith)
- March 12 – Danny Jones, British musician, singer and guitarist (McFLY)
- March 13 – Rose Elinor Dougall, English singer-songwriter and musician (Mark Ronson, The Pipettes)
- March 14 – Este Haim, American multi-instrumentalist and singer (member of sisterhood and Los Angeles pop rock band Haim)
- March 15
  - Adrianne Leon, American actress and singer
  - Natalie Prass, American singer-songwriter
- March 17
  - Andrew Goldstein, American singer-songwriter and record producer
  - Miles Kane, English singer and musician
- March 18 – Lykke Li, Swedish singer-songwriter and model
- March 20
  - Dean Geyer, South African–Australian singer-songwriter and actor
  - Oscar Görres, Swedish songwriter, record producer and musician
  - Ruby Rose, Australian model, DJ, recording artist, actress, television presenter, MTV VJ
- March 21
  - Sam Nixon, English singer and television presenter (Sam & Mark)
  - Scott Eastwood, American actor and producer son of Clint Eastwood
- March 22 – Amy Studt, English singer-songwriter and musician
- March 26
  - Jonny Craig, Canadian singer-songwriter
- March 28 – Lady Gaga, American singer-songwriter, activist, pianist and actor
- March 28 – J-Kwon, American rapper
- April 1 – Kid Ink, American rapper, singer-songwriter and record producer
- April 2
  - Mykki Blanco, American rapper, performance artist, poet and activist
  - Lee DeWyze, American singer-songwriter
- April 4 – Eunhyuk, Korean singer (Super Junior)
- April 7 – Choi Si-won, South Korean singer (Super Junior)
- April 8
  - Bridget Kelly, American singer-songwriter
  - Erika Sawajiri, Japanese actress and singer
- April 9 – Leighton Meester, An American actress, singer and model
- April 9 – Andy Nicholson, English musician, DJ, record producer and photographer (Arctic Monkeys)
- April 11 – Hayley Aitken, Australian singer-songwriter and record producer (Scarlett Belle)
- April 16 – Penny, American R&B singer (Git Fresh)
- April 19 – Zhou Mi, Chinese-South Korean singer
- April 23
  - Laura Mvula, British singer
  - Cirkut, Canadian musician, songwriter and producer (Ava Max)
- April 24 – Kellin Quinn, American post-hardcore singer-songwriter, musician, lead vocalist and keyboardist (Sleeping with Sirens; duet with Maggie Lindemann)
- April 28 – Jenna Ushkowitz, South Korean-born American actress, singer and podcast host
- April 29 – Qveen Herby, American rapper, singer-songwriter and entrepreneur
- April 30 – Dianna Agron, American actress, singer and dancer
- May 5 – Bart Baker, American parody artist
- May 6 – Emily Armstrong, American musician, singer-songwriter (Linkin Park, Dead Sara)
- May 7 – Matt Helders, English musician, singer-songwriter (Arctic Monkeys)
- May 8 – Tommy English (producer), American songwriter and producer
- May 12 – Emily VanCamp, French Canadian actress, dancer and martial artist
- May 13 – Alexander Rybak, Norwegian singer
- May 14
  - Alyosha, Ukrainian singer
  - Joseph Attieh, Lebanese singer
  - Amy Shark, Australian indie singer-songwriter and producer
- May 16
  - Andy Morin, Audio engineer for Death Grips
  - Charlie Fink, British songwriter, producer and filmmaker
- May 17 – Hannah Lux Davis, American music video director
- May 21
  - Myra, American singer
  - Da'Vine Joy Randolph, American actress and singer
- May 29 – No Min-woo, South Korean rapper (TRAX)
- May 30
  - Claudia Beni, Croatian pop singer
  - Jade Novah, American singer-songwriter
- May 31
  - Sopho Khalvashi, Georgian musician
  - Waka Flocka Flame, American rapper
- June 4 – Park Yoo-chun, South Korean singer (TVXQ)
- June 5 – Gin Wigmore, New Zealand singer-songwriter
- June 6 – Leslie Carter, American pop singer (sister of Aaron and Nick Carter) (D. 2012)
- June 9
  - Luis Felber, British-Peruvian musician
  - Kary Ng, Hong Kong singer (Cookies)
- June 10
  - Keith Harkin, Northern Irish singer (Celtic Thunder)
  - Tinchy Stryder, English rapper and producer
- June 13
  - DJ Snake, French DJ and record producer
  - Måns Zelmerlöw, Swedish singer-songwriter
- June 17 – Lingua Ignota, born Kristin Hayter, American classically trained neoclassical industrial multi-instrumentalist and activist against abuse
- June 24 – Solange Knowles, American singer-songwriter, activist, model and actress (Kelly Rowland and Michelle Williams)
- June 25 – Aya Matsuura, Japanese singer
- June 26 – Jordan Fish, British keyboardist, singer-songwriter and producer
- June 27 – Drake Bell, American actor/singer/musician
- June 28 – Kellie Pickler, American Idol singer
- June 29
  - Austin Drage, British actor and singer
  - Edward Maya, Romanian musician, record producer, DJ and singer-songwriter
- June 30 – Jamai Loman, Dutch singer, actor and presenter
- July 1 – Agnez Mo, Indonesian diva singer-songwriter, dancer,and actress
- July 2 – Lindsay Lohan, American actress, musician, singer-songwriter, documentary-maker, businesswoman and model (Samantha Ronson, Hilary Duff, Aliana Lohan)
- July 5 – Adam Young, American singer-songwriter and producer (Owl City, Sky Sailing)
- July 16 – Misako Uno, Japanese singer (Attack All Around)
- July 17
  - Jason Aalon Butler, American musician (Letlive, Fever 333, Pressure Cracks), married to Gin Wigmore
  - Dana, South Korean actress and singer
- July 21 – Rebecca Ferguson, British singer-songwriter
- July 24 – Jai McDowall, Scottish singer-songwriter (G4)
- July 28 – Alexandra Richards, American DJ
- August 1 – Marissa Paternoster, American artist, singer and guitarist (Screaming Females)
- August 19 – Christina Perri, American singer/songwriter, musician and artist
- August 23
  - Neil Cicierega, American singer/songwriter, musician (Lemon Demon)
  - Sky Blu, American rapper, singer-songwriter, record producer, DJ and dancer
- August 26
  - Big K.R.I.T., American rapper and record producer
  - Cassie, American singer and dancer
  - Laza Morgan, singer
- August 27 – Mario, American R&B singer-songwriter
- August 28 – Florence Welch, English musician, singer-songwriter, music producer, author, poet and performer (Florence and the Machine)
- August 29 – Lea Michele, American singer and actress
- August 30 – Ryan Ross, American musician, singer-songwriter (Panic! at the Disco)
- September 3 – OMI, Jamaican singer
- September 6
  - Anna von Hausswolff, Swedish singer-songwriter, musician, composer and pipe organist
  - Illy, Australian rapper
  - Michael Murphy, New Zealand singer
- September 8 – Leah LaBelle, Canadian-born American singer
- September 9 – JJ Bird, English boxer
- September 10 – Ashley Monroe, American country music singer-songwriter (Pistol Annies)
- September 12 – Emmy Rossum, American actress and singer
- September 14 – Ai Takahashi, Japanese singer and actress (Morning Musume)
- September 15
  - Heidi Montag, American reality television personality, model, singer and actress
  - George Watsky, American hip-hop artist, author and poet
- September 17 – SOPHIE, Scottish music producer, songwriter and DJ
- September 19 – Ilya Salmanzadeh, Swedish music producer
- September 21 – Lindsey Stirling, American violinist, dancer, YouTuber, record producer and performance artist
- September 22 – Casisdead, a UK rap and grime MC, songwriter, record producer, music video director and entrepreneur from Tottenham, London.
- September 26 – Brooke Allison, American pop singer
- September 27
  - Natasha Thomas, Danish singer-songwriter
  - Alison Wonderland, Australian electronic dance music DJ, producer and singer
- October 1 – Jurnee Smollett-Bell, American actress and singer
- October 6 – Meg Myers, American singer-songwriter
- October 12 – Boi-1da, Canadian record producer and songwriter
- October 13 – Illa J, American rapper, singer, record producer and songwriter (Slum Village)
- October 14 – Swings, South Korean rapper (Uptown)
- October 15 – Lee Donghae, South Korean singer (Super Junior)
- October 16 – Inna, Romanian singer
- October 17 – Mohombi, Congolese-Swedish musician, singer, composer and dancer9
- October 21 – Christopher von Uckermann, Mexican singer and actor (RBD)
- October 23 – Briana Evigan, American actress and dancer
- October 24 – Drake, Canadian rapper
- October 25 – Didi Benami, American singer
- October 28 – Aki Toyosaki, Japanese actress and singer (K-On!)
- October 29 – Nataly Dawn, American musician
- November 2 – Ryan Hurd, American singer-songwriter
- November 3
  - Jermaine Jones, American singer
  - Jasmine Trias, Filipino-American singer-entertainer
- November 4 – Alexz Johnson, Canadian musician, actress and philanthropist
- November 5 – BoA, South Korean singer, dancer, songwriter and producer
- November 7 – Toro y Moi, American singer-songwriter, record producer and graphic designer
- November 8 – Nikola Rachelle, British recording artist and songwriter
- November 11 – Jon Batiste, American jazz musician
- November 14 – Yuna (singer), Malaysian singer-songwriter.
- November 15 – Jerry Roush, American singer-songwriter (Of Mice & Men, Sky Eats Airplane, Glass Cloud)
- November 20 – Oli Sykes, English/Brazilian heavy metal vocalist, singer-songwriter and entrepreneur (Bring Me the Horizon)
- November 21 – Colleen Ballinger, American comedian, actress, singer and YouTube personality
- November 25 – Katie Cassidy, American actress, singer and voice actress
- November 27
  - Christina Novelli, English DJ and singer-songwriter
  - Oritsé Williams, English R&B singer (JLS)
- December 7 – JB Gill, English R&B singer, television presenter and farmer (JLS)
- December 8 – Kate Voegele, American singer-songwriter and actress
- December 10 – Natti Natasha, Dominican singer
- December 11 – Shuta Sueyoshi, Japanese singer
- December 15
  - Mikaila, American actress and singer-songwriter
  - Xiah, Korean singer (TVXQ)
- December 20 – Anoop Desai, American singer-songwriter
- December 26 – Marina Satti, Greek singer-songwriter and music producer
- December 29 – Colin Brittain, American drummer (Linkin Park)
- December 30
  - Ellie Goulding, English singer-songwriter
  - Caity Lotz, American singer, dancer, actor and martial artist
- Unknown:
  - Samantha McClymont, Australian singer-songwriter (Brooke McClymont)
  - Kirsten Joy, English singer-songwriter and touring member of Clean Bandit.
  - Jourdan Thibodeaux, American Cajun music fiddler and singer

== Deaths ==
- January 4 – Phil Lynott, bassist/singer and co-founder of Thin Lizzy, 36 (heart failure & pneumonia)
- January 6 – Joe Farrell, jazz saxophonist, 48 (bone cancer)
- January 8 – Pierre Fournier, cellist, 79
- February 2 – Francisco Mignone, composer, 88
- February 14 – Edmund Rubbra, composer, 84
- February 15 – Galliano Masini, operatic tenor, 90
- March 4
  - Richard Manuel (The Band), 42 (suicide)
  - Howard Greenfield, songwriter, 49 (AIDS)
- March 11 – Sonny Terry, blues musician, 74
- March 21 – Raymond Burke, jazz clarinetist, 81
- March 22 – Mark Dinning, US singer, 52 (heart attack)
- March 30 – James Cagney, US actor, singer and dancer, 86
- March 31 – O'Kelly Isley of the Isley Brothers, 48 (heart attack)
- April 1 – Donald Grobe, operatic tenor, 56
- April 3 – Peter Pears, opera singer and partner of Benjamin Britten, 75
- April 6 – Boris Gutnikov, violinist, 54
- April 8 – Yukiko Okada, singer, 18 (suicide)
- April 13 – Dorothy Ashby, jazz harpist and composer, 53 (cancer)
- April 19
  - Dag Wirén, composer, 80
  - Estelle Yancey, blues singer, 90
- June 3 – Anna Neagle, actress, singer and dancer, 81
- June 13 – Benny Goodman, bandleader, 77
- June 14 – Alan Jay Lerner, lyricist, 67
- June 16 – Maurice Duruflé, composer, 84
- June 17 – Kate Smith, singer, 79
- June 19 – Jean Bonhomme, Canadian tenor, 49
- June 29 – Dusolina Giannini, operatic soprano, 83
- July 3 – Rudy Vallee, American singer, 84
- July 18 – Don Wilkerson, American saxophonist
- July 23 – Kazimierz Sikorski, Polish composer, 91
- July 31 – Teddy Wilson, American jazz pianist, 73
- September 27 – Cliff Burton (Metallica), 24 (tour bus accident)
- September 28 – Robert Helpmann, dancer and choreographer, 77
- October 16 – Arthur Grumiaux, violinist, 65
- October 22 – Thorgeir Stubø, Norwegian jazz guitarist, 42
- October 29 – Abel Meeropol ('Lewis Allan'), American lyricist, 83
- November 1 – Sippie Wallace, blues singer, 88
- November 3 – Eddie Davis, saxophonist, 64
- November 6 – Elisabeth Grümmer, operatic soprano, 75
- November 7 – Tracy Pew, bass guitarist, 28 (brain hemorrhage)
- November 13 – Rudolf Schock, operatic tenor, 71
- November 18 – Lajos Bárdos, composer and conductor, 87
- November 22 – Scatman Crothers, singer, dancer and musician, 76
- December 1 – Horace Heidt, pianist and bandleader, 85
- December 10
  - Victor Guillermo Ramos Rangel, Venezuelan classical musician, 75
  - Kate Wolf, folk singer and songwriter, 44 (leukemia)
- December 30 – Charles Magnante, accordionist, composer, arranger, author, and educator, 81

== Awards ==
- Rock and Roll Hall of Fame opened; the following artists were the first inductees: Elvis Presley, Chuck Berry, James Brown, Ray Charles, Sam Cooke, Fats Domino, The Everly Brothers, Buddy Holly, Jerry Lee Lewis, Little Richard and record producer Sam Phillips.
- Grammy Awards of 1986
- 1986 Country Music Association Awards
- Eurovision Song Contest 1986
- 28th Japan Record Awards

== Charts ==
- List of Billboard Hot 100 number ones of 1986
- 1986 in British music#Charts
- List of Oricon number-one singles of 1986

== See also ==
- Record labels established in 1986
