= Just Listen =

Just Listen may refer to:

- Just Listen (novel), a 2006 novel by Sarah Dessen
- Just Listen, a 2009 book by Mark Goulston
- Just Listen (Seven album), 2003
- Just Listen (Joey Baron album), 2013
- Just Listen (EP), an EP by Younha
- Just Listen, a 1976 album by Alan Steward
- Just Listen, a 2000 album by Pat Kirtley
- "Just Listen", a song by Ivor Cutler from A Wet Handle
- "Just Listen", a poem by Peter Johnson
