= Life in a Scotch Sitting Room, Vol. 2 =

Live album by Ivor Cutler
- Released: 1978
- Recorded: 3rd Eye Centre, Sauchiehall Street, Glasgow 7 July 1977–9 July 1977
- Genre: Spoken word
- Length: 53:14
- Label: Harvest

Ivor Cutler chronology
Jammy Smears (1976)	Life in a Scotch Sitting Room, Vol. 2 (1978)	Privilege (1983)

Professional ratings
Review scores
Source	Rating
Allmusic	(4.5/5)

Life in a Scotch Sitting Room, Vol. 2 is an album by Ivor Cutler, originally released in 1978. It was recorded live in Cutler's native Glasgow, and tells stories from his childhood growing up in a middle-class family around the time of the Great Depression.

The poems and stories from the album were also published as a book in 1984.

The sleeve notes include the following:

"Recorded by Pete Shipton of Radio Clyde at the 3rd Eye Centre, Sauchiehall Street, Glasgow, on the 7th, 8th, 9th of July, 1977.

Edited by Seán Murphy & Pat Stapely, and Master Record cut by Mick Webb.

All tracks registered with P.R.S and M.C.P.S and ©1977 Ivor Cutler.

Sleeve front - Helen Oxenbury ©1977. Lettering - Phyllis April King.

Deep gratitude to Al Clark and Seán Murphy."

Episodes 1 and 3 were tracks on the 1974 album Dandruff, although there is a discrepancy in the title shown for one of the tracks on that album compared with the track titles on Life in a Scotch Sitting Room, Vol.2. Four other episodes in total were previously recorded on Velvet Donkey and Jammy Smears.

== Track listing ==
(All tracks written by Ivor Cutler)
Side one

1. "Episode 2" – 4:55
2. "Episode 3" – 3:45
3. "Episode 9" – 3:40
4. "Jungle Tip: Owl" – 0:44
5. "Episode 1" – 3:12
6. "Episode 11" – 4:02
7. "Jungle Tip: Lion" – 0:45
8. "Episode 5" – 3:13
9. "Episode 14" – 3:53

Side two

1. "Episode 7" – 3:54
2. "Episode 12" – 4:10
3. "Jungle Tip: Leopard" – 0:41
4. "Episode 8" – 3:52
5. "Episode 6" – 2:47
6. "Episode 4" – 3:44
7. "Jungle Tip: Boa" – 0:31
8. "Episode 13" – 5:22
9. "Episode 0" – 0:00
