= Eternity Road =

Eternity Road may refer to:

- "Eternity Road" (song), a 1969 song by The Moody Blues
- Eternity Road (novel), a 1998 science fiction novel by American author Jack McDevitt
- Eternity Road: Reflections of Lowlife 85–95, a 2006 compilation album by Scottish alternative rock/dream pop band Lowlife
