= Godhead (disambiguation) =

Godhead (from Middle English godhede, "godhood", and unrelated to the modern word "head") is a Middle English variant of the word godhood, and denotes the divinity or substance (ousia) of God.

Godhead may also refer to:

- Godhead (band), an American industrial rock/metal band
- Godhead (album), an album by Scottish dream pop band Lowlife
- "Godhead", the second single taken from Nitzer Ebb's 1991 album Ebbhead
- "Godhead", a song by Garbage from No Gods No Masters
- Godhead, a member of the Marvel Comics characters Celestials
- Krishna, the Supreme Personality of Godhead, a book by A. C. Bhaktivedanta Swami Prabhupada
- Godhead Trilogy, science fiction series by James K. Morrow published 1994–1999
