= Diminuendo (disambiguation) =

Diminuendo is a gradual decrease of loudness in music.

Diminuendo may also refer to:

- Diminuendo (album), by Lowlife
- Diminuendo (film), starring Richard Hatch
- Diminuendo (horse), 1988 winner of the Epsom Oaks
