= Goulston =

Goulston is a surname. Notable people with the surname include:

- Mark Goulston (born 1948), American psychiatrist
- Theodore Goulston (1572–1632), English physician and scholar

== See also ==
- Goulston Street graffito, writing on a wall associated with the 1888 Whitechapel murders investigation
