= Jammy Smears =

Studio album by Ivor Cutler
- Released: 1976
- Recorded: 1976
- Genre: Spoken word
- Length: 45:23
- Label: Virgin Records

Ivor Cutler chronology
Velvet Donkey (1975)	Jammy Smears (1976)	Life in a Scotch Sitting Room, Vol. 2 (1978)

Professional ratings
Review scores
Source	Rating
Allmusic	4/5 stars

Jammy Smears is a studio album by Ivor Cutler, originally released in 1976. It was the last of the three albums he released on Virgin Records, and as with the previous two he is joined by Phyllis King, who reads six of her own poems and short stories.

== Track listing ==
All tracks written by Ivor Cutler except where noted

Side one

1. "Bicarbonate of Chicken" – 0:50
2. "Filcombe Cottage, Dorset" – 0:22 (King)
3. "Squeeze Bees" – 2:24
4. "The Turn" – 0:30
5. "Life in a Scotch Sitting Room, Vol. 2 Ep. II" – 3:54
6. "A Linnet" – 0:25 (King)
7. "Jumping and Pecking" – 0:44
8. "The Other Half" – 0:46
9. "Beautiful Cosmos" – 2:10
10. "The Path" – 0:40
11. "Barabadabada" – 1:02
12. "Big Jim" – 3:01
13. "In the Chestnut Tree" – 1:29
14. "Dust" – 1:02 (King)
15. "Rubber Toy" – 2:03
16. "Fistyman" – 0:08

Side two

1. "Unexpected Join" – 0:12
2. "A Wooden Tree" – 2:13
3. "When I Stand on an Open Cart" – 0:38
4. "High Is the Wind" – 1:26
5. "The Surly Buddy" – 4:16
6. "Pearly-Winged Fly" – 0:41 (King)
7. "Garden Path at Filcombe" – 0:40
8. "Paddington Town" – 1:34
9. "Cage of Small Birds" – 0:18 (King)
10. "Life in a Scotch Sitting Room, Vol. 2 Ep. 6" – 3:09
11. "Irk" – 0:23
12. "Lemon Flower" – 1:02
13. "Red Admiral" – 0:47 (King)
14. "Everybody Got" – 2:08
15. "The Wasted Call" – 4:26 (with King)
