= Phyllis King =

British poet

Phyllis April King, née Leiterman, is a British poet and children's author. She appears and reads her material on Ivor Cutler's albums Dandruff, Velvet Donkey and Jammy Smears. King designed some of the Ivor Cutler album covers, and worked with him on the radio series King Cutler which was broadcast on BBC Radio 3 in 1990.

== Personal life ==
King was born in Canada to a creative family whose siblings Douglas, Richard and Elaine (Campbell) were all in film and television. She married film director Allan King, with whom she had a daughter, and they moved to London in the 1960s where she worked as a teacher. They divorced in the late 1960s.

King was in a long-term relationship with Ivor Cutler for over forty years up to his death in 2006 though they did not live together, preferring to retain their independence. Cutler wrote the song "Beautiful Cosmos" about her. She lives in Wiltshire.

== Stage portrayal ==
In 2014 she was portrayed by Elicia Daly in the stage play The Beautiful Cosmos of Ivor Cutler, a co-production by Vanishing Point and National Theatre of Scotland.

== Bibliography ==
=== Poetry ===
- Dust – Newcastle upon Tyne: Morden Tower Publications, 1978.
- Close Views – Newcastle upon Tyne: Morden Tower Publications, 1980.

=== Children's books ===
- The Hungry Cat – London: Walker, 1986. (Illustrated by Phyllis King) ISBN 0744514150
- Apple Green and Runner Bean – London: Walker, 1993. (Illustrated by Phyllis King) ISBN 0744547334
