= From a Scream to a Whisper =

From a Scream to a Whisper (a retrospective 85–88)

Compilation album by Lowlife
- Released: 1990
- Recorded: Scotland
- Genre: Post-punk, alternative rock, dream pop, shoegaze
- Label: Nightshift Records
- Producer: Keith Mitchell and Lowlife

Lowlife chronology
Godhead (1989)	From a Scream to a Whisper (a retrospective 85–88) (1990)	San Antorium (1991)

Professional ratings
Review scores
Source	Rating
College Music Journal	favourable

From a Scream to a Whisper is a compilation album consisting of material taken from all of Lowlife's previously released singles, EPs and albums. No new or previously unavailable songs appeared on the album.

== Track listing ==
1. "Ramafied"
2. "Sometime: Something"
3. "Cowards Way"
4. "Big Uncle Ugliness"
5. "Wild Swan"
6. "Hollow Gut"
7. "Again and Again"
8. "A Sullen Sky"
9. "As It Happens"
10. "Eternity Road"
11. "Swing"
12. "From Side to Side"

All tracks were written by Will Heggie/Craig Lorentson/Stuart Everest/Grant McDowall

== Personnel ==
Lowlife

- Craig Lorentson - vocals
- Stuart Everest - guitar
- Will Heggie - bass guitar
- Grant McDowall - drums
