= San Antorium =

Studio album by Lowlife
- Released: 1991
- Studio: Tower Studios, Glasgow
- Genre: Alternative rock, dream pop
- Length: 43:16
- Label: Nightshift Records; LTM
- Producer: Calum MacLean

Lowlife chronology
| From a Scream to a Whisper (1990) | San Antorium (1991) | Gush (1995) |

Professional ratings
Review scores
| Source | Rating |
|---|---|
| AllMusic | 4/5 stars |

San Antorium was Lowlife's fourth album, released in 1991 in Scotland on Nightshift Records. The LP was recorded at Tower Studios in Glasgow, Scotland. Personnel changes prior to the album's recording involved the near-simultaneous departures of guitarist Hamish McIntosh and drummer Grant McDowall, who were replaced by Hugh Duggie and Greg Orr, respectively. Orr's role was somewhat limited as several of the tracks employed drum programming and/or drum loops. LTM Recordings reissued much of the band's entire back catalogue on CD in 2006, and San Antorium was released with five bonus tracks taken from the band's "Black Sessions" demo album.

== Track listing ==
All tracks composed by Lowlife

1. "Jaw" – 3:31
2. "Inside In" – 5:09
3. "My Mothers Fatherly Father" – 4:08
4. "Big Fat Funky Whale" – 3:51
5. "Good As It Gets" – 5:05
6. "Suddenly Violently Random" – 4:02
7. "June Wilson" – 4:52
8. "Give Up Giving Up" – 4:15
9. "Bathe" – 4:06
10. "As Old As New" – 4:17

Bonus Tracks on 2006 CD Reissue:

1. "Missing the Kick" – 3:48
2. "Bittersweet" – 3:52
3. "Forever Filthy" – 3:20
4. "Neverending Shroud" – 3:30
5. "We the Cheated" – 3:23

== Personnel ==
Lowlife

- Craig Lorentson - vocals
- Hugh Duggie - guitar
- Will Heggie - bass guitar
- Greg Orr McDowall - drums

Additional musicians

- Calum MacLean - guitars, three-hand bass, chorus guitar, programming
- Steven Nelson - additional drum programming
- Martin Fleming - drum loops, Burst snare drum loops
- Linda Jackson - backing vocals
- Joyce Monaghen - backing vocals
- Jacqueline Balloch - backing vocals
