= Dandruff (album) =

Studio album by Ivor Cutler
- Released: 1974
- Recorded: 1974
- Genre: Spoken word
- Length: 44:31
- Label: Virgin
- Producer: Ivor Cutler

Ivor Cutler chronology
Ludo (1967)	Dandruff (1974)	Velvet Donkey (1975)

Professional ratings
Review scores
Source	Rating
AllMusic	(2.5/5)

Dandruff is an album by Ivor Cutler, originally released in 1974. It was the first of three LPs that Cutler released through Virgin Records in the mid-1970s; Cutler had signed to the label after an appearance on Robert Wyatt's Rock Bottom, which Virgin had released earlier that year. Many of the album's 45 tracks are simple poems or brief short stories—including seven poems composed and read by Phyllis King, but there are also a number of musical pieces including the calypso-inspired "I Believe in Bugs", which became particularly well loved among Cutler's compositions. The LP was also the first to feature episodes from Cutler's Life in a Scotch Sitting Room series of autobiographical stories, which resulted in 1978's Life in a Scotch Sitting Room, Vol. 2.

== Track listing ==
All tracks written by Ivor Cutler except where noted.

Side one

1. "Solo on Mbira (Bikembe) in – 5:3 Time" – 0:14
2. "Dad's Lapse" – 0:19
3. "I Worn My Elbows" – 2:06
4. "Hair Grips" (Phyllis King) – 0:13
5. "I Believe in Bugs" – 1:15
6. "Fremsley" – 3:13
7. "Goozeberries and Bilberries" – 1:01
8. "Time" (King) – 0:15
9. "I'm Walking to a Farm" – 2:27
10. "The Railway Sleepers" – 1:19
11. "Life in Scotch Sitting Room, Vol. 2 Ep. 1" – 2:54
12. "Three Sisters" – 0:42
13. "Baby Sits" – 2:07
14. "Not Big Enough" (King) – 0:07
15. "A Barrel of Nails" – 1:35

Side two

1. "Men" (King) – 0:10
2. "Trouble Trouble" – 1:35
3. "I Love You" (King) – 0:09
4. "Vein Girl" – 0:31
5. "Five Wise Saws" – 0:43
6. "Life in a Scotch Sitting Room" – 3:08
7. "The Painful League" – 0:58
8. "Piano Tuner Song 2000 AD" – 1:17
9. "Self Knowledge" – 0:22
10. "An Old Oak Tree" – 1:11
11. "The Aimless Dawnrunner" – 2:15
12. "Face Like a Lemon" – 3:20
13. "A Bird" (King) – 0:34
14. "A Hole in My Toe" – 1:26
15. "My Mother Has Two Red Lips" – 0:19
16. "I Like Sitting" – 0:28
17. "The Forgetful Fowl" – 0:28
18. "If Everybody" – 0:08
19. "For Sixpence" – 0:43
20. "I Used to Lie in Bed" – 0:21
21. "If All the Cornflakes" – 0:31
22. "My Sock" – 0:27
23. "When I Entered" – 0:13
24. "Two Balls" – 0:15
25. "Miss Velvetlips" – 0:42
26. "Lean" – 0:32
27. "Fur Coats" – 0:35
28. "The Darkness" – 0:44
29. "A Beautiful Woman" – 0:19
30. "Making Tidy" (King) – 0:19

Note: Side 2 Track 6 is listed as Life in a Scotch sittingroom, Vol.2 ep.1 on the cover of the original LP. However, this track appears as Episode 3 on the Life in a Scotch Sitting Room Vol II CD.

== Personnel ==
- Ivor Cutler – piano, harmonium, keyboards, vocals
- Phyllis King – vocals

Technical

- Tom Newman – recording
