= Ludo (Ivor Cutler album) =

Studio album by Ivor Cutler Trio
- Released: November 1967
- Recorded: 1967
- Genres: Spoken word, singer-songwriter
- Length: 32:11
- Label: EMI
- Producer: George Martin

Ivor Cutler Trio chronology
| Get Away from the Wall (1961) | Ludo (1967) | Dandruff (1974) |

Professional ratings
Review scores
| Source | Rating |
|---|---|
| Allmusic | 4.5/5 stars |
| The Daily Telegraph | (favourable) |

Ludo is a 1967 album by Ivor Cutler, credited to the Ivor Cutler Trio, comprising Cutler with bassist Gill Lyons and percussionist Trevor Tomkins. The album was produced by George Martin, famous for his work with the Beatles, in a collaboration that came about after Cutler had appeared in the Beatles' Magical Mystery Tour film earlier that year.

The album's title and cover allude to the board game of the same name. The music takes inspiration from trad jazz and boogie-woogie and has drawn comparisons to The Goon Show. Four of the album's tracks are spoken stories, some backed with Cutler's ambient harmonium music.

== Track listing ==
All compositions by Ivor Cutler

1. "Mud" – 1:03
2. "A Great Grey Grasshopper" – 2:21
3. "Darling, Will You Marry Me Twice" – 0:53
4. "A Still, Small Fly" – 1:12
5. "Deedle, Deedly, I Pass" – 1:47
6. "I Had a Little Boat" – 2:03
7. "Cockadoodledon't" – 1:11
8. "Shoplifters" – 2:18
9. "Mary's Drawer" – 3:34
10. "I'm Happy" – 0:38
11. "I'm Going in a Field" – 2:09
12. "Go on, Jump!" – 0:49
13. "Flim Flam Flum" – 2:06
14. "Good Morning! How Are You? Shut Up!" – 1:26
15. "Last Song" – 2:02
16. "A Suck of My Thumb" – 2:25
17. "The Shapely Balloon" – 4:04

== Personnel ==
=== Ivor Cutler Trio ===
- Ivor Cutler – vocals, keyboards
- Gill Lyons – double bass
- Trevor Tomkins – percussion

=== Technical ===
- Producer – George Martin
- Artwork – Toby Egelnick
