= Privilege (Ivor Cutler album) =

Studio album by Ivor Cutler
- Released: 1983
- Recorded: 1983
- Genre: Spoken word
- Label: Rough Trade
- Producer: David Toop, Steve Beresford

Ivor Cutler chronology
| Life in a Scotch Sitting Room, Vol. 2 (1978) | Privilege (1983) | Prince Ivor (1986) |

Professional ratings
Review scores
| Source | Rating |
|---|---|
| Allmusic | 2.5/5 stars |

Privilege is an album by Ivor Cutler, originally released in 1983 on Rough Trade Records. It was produced by David Toop and Steve Beresford, both of whom are better known for their work in improvisational music and, unlike Cutler's 1970s recordings, it sees Cutler's vocals accompanied by a wide range of musical instruments including keyboards, banjo, euphonium and alto flute. The LP is co-credited to Linda Hirst, who recites a number of poems and provides vocals on some of the tracks. The closing track, "Women of the World", was released as a single and became a minor hit on the UK Indie Chart. It has since been covered by Jim O'Rourke, on his 1999 album Eureka, YACHT, on their 2007 album I Believe In You. Your Magic Is Real. and KarinePolwart, on her album Karine Polwart's Scottish Songbook (2019).

The album was re-released on CD in 2009 by Hoorgi House Records.

== Track listing ==
(all tracks written by Ivor Cutler)
Side one

1. "Sit Down"
2. "Use a Brick"
3. "Home Is the Sailor"
4. "For Practice"
5. "A Doughnut in My Hand"
6. "Fair's Fair"
7. "Killer Bee (Jungle Tip)"
8. "Whale Badge"
9. "Blue Bear"
10. "Creamy Pumpkins"
11. "Counting Song"
12. "My Darling"
13. "Life in a Scotch Sitting Room Vol.2 (Episode 15)"
14. "Mostly Tins"
15. "Tomato Brain"
16. "Bad Eye"
17. "Silent 'S'"
18. "Halfway Through"
19. "Look at the Moon"

Side two

1. "Old Black Dog"
2. "The Gathering Doubt"
3. "Pussy on the Mat"
4. "Large & Puffy"
5. "People Run to the Edge"
6. "Country Door"
7. "Piranhas (Jungle Tip)"
8. "Brenda"
9. "I Love You But I Don't Know What I Mean"
10. "Breathing Regularly"
11. "Life in a Scotch Sitting Room Vol.2 (Episode 16)"
12. "Full of Goods"
13. "Ok, I'll Count to 8"
14. "Secret Drinker"
15. "Pass the Ball Jim (for John Peel)"
16. "Over You Go"
17. "Step It Out Lively, Boys"
18. "Uncut Moquette"
19. "Women of the World"
