= Ivor Cutler =

Musical artist (1923–2006)

Background information
- Born: Isadore Cutler; 15 January 1923; Govan, Glasgow, Scotland
- Died: 3 March 2006 (aged 83) London, England
- Genres: Poetry, trad jazz, comedy, spoken word
- Occupations: Poet, singer, musician, songwriter, humorist
- Instruments: Harmonium, piano
- Years active: 1959–2006
- Labels: Decca, Virgin, Harvest, Rough Trade, Creation

Ivor Cutler (born Isadore Cutler, 15 January 1923 – 3 March 2006) was a Scottish poet, singer, musician, songwriter, artist and humorist. He became known for his regular performances on BBC radio, and in particular his numerous sessions recorded for the distinguished DJ John Peel's influential eponymous late-night radio programme (on BBC Radio 1), and later for Andy Kershaw's programme. He appeared in the Beatles' Magical Mystery Tour film in 1967, and on Neil Innes's television programmes. Cutler also wrote books for children and adults, and was a teacher at A. S. Neill's Summerhill School and for 30 years in inner-city schools in London.

In live performances Cutler would often accompany himself on a harmonium. Phyllis King appears on several of his records, and for several years was a part of his concerts. She usually read small phrases but also read a few short stories. The two starred in a BBC radio series, King Cutler, in which they performed their material jointly and singly. Cutler also collaborated with pianist Neil Ardley, singer Robert Wyatt, guitarist Fred Frith, and musicians David Toop and Steve Beresford.

== Early life ==
Ivor Cutler was born on 15 January 1923 at 3 Ralston Drive, Govan, Glasgow, into a family of Ashkenazi Jewish origins.. He was the second son and the third of five children. His father Jack Moris Cutler was a draper and jeweller. He cited his childhood as the source of his artistic temperament, recalling a sense of displacement when his younger brother was born: "Without that I would not have been so screwed up as I am, and therefore not as creative." He was educated at the Shawlands Academy. In 1939 Cutler was evacuated to Annan. He joined the Royal Air Force as a navigator in 1942 but was soon grounded for "dreaminess" and worked as a storeman. He moved to London where he was employed by the Inner London Education Authority to teach music, dance, drama and poetry to 7-to-11-year-olds. Cutler's deeply held views on humanity meant he disliked corporal punishment and on leaving a teaching job he held in the 1950s he cut up his tawse and handed the pieces to the class.

== Musical career ==
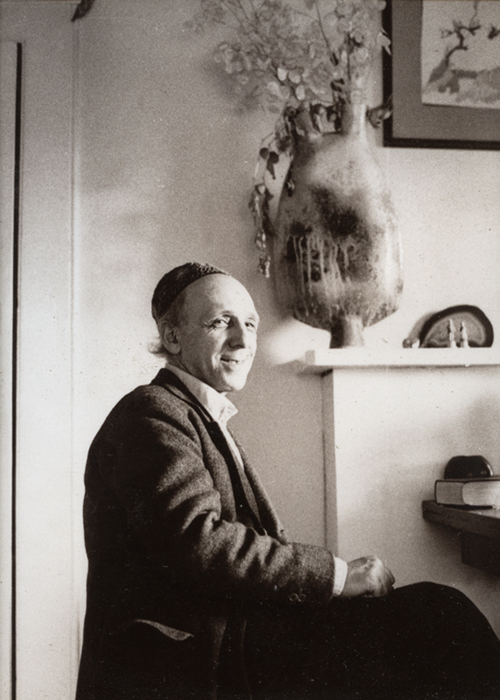
Cutler at his flat in Gospel Oak, North London, in 1973

Cutler began writing songs and poetry in the late 1950s, making the first of many appearances on BBC radio on the Home Service, where he featured on the Monday Night at Home programme on 38 occasions between 1959 and 1963. He gained popularity playing songs where he would often accompany himself on either a piano or the harmonium, and this success led to the release of a series of records starting with 1959's Ivor Cutler of Y'Hup EP. Cutler appeared in the pop musical film It's All Over Town in 1964, and continued to make appearances on the BBC's programmes during the 1960s, and as a result of an appearance on the television show Late Night Line-Up, he was noticed by Paul McCartney, who invited Cutler to appear in the Beatles' Magical Mystery Tour film. In the film, Cutler plays would-be courier Buster Bloodvessel who becomes passionately attracted to Ringo Starr's Aunt Jessie. Following this film role, Cutler recorded an LP, Ludo (1967), produced by George Martin, and credited to the Ivor Cutler Trio, made up of Cutler with bassist Gill Lyons and percussionist Trevor Tomkins. The album, taking inspiration from trad jazz and boogie-woogie, sees Cutler playing the piano as well as his usual harmonium, and is considered the most traditionally musical of all his records. After its release Cutler continued to perform for BBC radio, recording the first of his sessions for John Peel in 1969. Cutler's work on Peel's shows would introduce him to successive generations of fans, and in the early 1990s, Cutler said, "Thanks to Peel, I gained a whole new audience, to the amazement of my older fans, who find themselves among 16-to-35s in theatres, and wonder where they came from."

In the 1970s, Neil Ardley had Cutler sing on his album A Symphony of Amaranths (1971), and former-Soft Machine drummer Robert Wyatt asked Cutler to play harmonium and sing on two of the tracks on his album Rock Bottom (1974). The collaboration with Wyatt led to Cutler being signed to Wyatt's record label Virgin Records, for whom Cutler recorded three albums in the mid-1970s: Dandruff (1974), Velvet Donkey (1975) and Jammy Smears (1976). Each of these discs intersperses Cutler's poems and songs with readings by his performing companion Phyllis King. Wyatt would later cover Cutler's song "Go and Sit upon the Grass".

During the decade Cutler used his sessions for John Peel to introduce numerous episodes of his Life in a Scotch Sitting Room series, culminating in the 1978 album Life in a Scotch Sitting Room, Vol. 2, regarded as a particularly autobiographical work, on which Cutler recounts tales from his childhood amid an environment of exaggerated Scottishness. Cutler also produced the work as a book, which was published in 1984 with illustrations by Martin Honeysett.

Cutler contributed the track "Brooch Boat" to the cult 1980 album Miniatures, produced and edited by Morgan Fisher, which consisted entirely of one-minute-long recordings. In the 1980s, Rough Trade Records released three albums—Privilege (1983), Prince Ivor (1986) and Gruts (1986). Cutler also released the single "Women of the World", recorded with Linda Hirst, through the label in 1983. In the 1990s, Creation Records released two new volumes of poems and spoken word work: A Wet Handle (1997) and A Flat Man (1998).

== Books and poetry ==
Poetry and books for children were an important part of Cutler's literary output. There were crossovers, where parts of the public performances, albums, and books had the same name; the most notable and regular favourite at performances was Life in a Scotch Sitting Room, Volume 2, combining the book with the album.

== Reception and legacy ==
Cutler was a noted eccentric, dressing in a distinctive style including plus-fours and hats adorned with many badges, travelling mainly by bicycle and often communicating by means of sticky labels printed with "Cutlerisms", one of which, "never knowingly understood" came to be applied by supporters and detractors alike (the latter phrase is a play on 'never knowingly undersold', which was for many years the slogan of the John Lewis Partnership). Others included "Kindly disregard", reserved for official correspondence, and "to remove this label take it off". The reception room of his home contained some pieces of ivory cutlery, a pun on his name. He was a member of the Noise Abatement Society and the Voluntary Euthanasia Society.

Composer, multi-instrumentalist and producer Jim O'Rourke covered Cutler's 1983 song "Women of the World" on his album Eureka (1999). This song was also covered by Karine Polwart on her "Scottish Songbook" album. In April 2005 BBC Four broadcast Ivor Cutler: Looking for Truth with a Pin, an hour-long documentary directed by Paul Spencer, featuring contributions from Paul McCartney and Billy Connolly. In October 2012 in Seattle, Washington, the Mark Morris Dance Group premiered a work entitled "Wooden Tree," featuring recordings of Cutler's renditions of his songs. In 2014 a new play, The Beautiful Cosmos of Ivor Cutler, a co-production by Vanishing Point and National Theatre of Scotland, was performed. In October 2020 Sky Arts broadcast Ivor Cutler by KT Tunstall, an hour-long documentary in which the singer-songwriter explored Cutler's life and work, with contributions from Noel Fielding, Arnold Brown and Alan McGee.

Cutler earned a faithful cult following. English radio host John Peel once remarked that Cutler was probably the only performer whose work had been featured on Radio 1, 2, 3 and 4.

He retired from performing in 2004, and died on 3 March 2006, from a stroke while in London.

Reflections upon his poetry, humour and legacy continued well after his death.

== Discography ==
=== Albums and EPs ===
- 1959 Ivor Cutler of Y'Hup (EP, Decca)
- 1961 Who Tore Your Trousers? (Decca)
- 1961 Get Away from the Wall (EP, Decca)
- 1967 Ludo (EMI)
- 1974 Dandruff (Virgin)
- 1975 Velvet Donkey (Virgin)
- 1976 Jammy Smears (Virgin)
- 1978 Life in a Scotch Sitting Room, Vol. 2 (Harvest)
- 1983 Privilege (with Linda Hirst, Rough Trade)
- 1986 Prince Ivor (Rough Trade)
- 1986 Gruts (Rough Trade)
- 1989 Peel Sessions (EP, Strange Fruit, 1969 recordings)
- 1997 A Wet Handle (Creation)
- 1997 Ludo (Rev-Ola, 1967 recordings)
- 1998 A Flat Man (Creation)
- 2019 Singing While Dead (EP, Hoorgi House, 4 unreleased 1950s recordings)

=== Compilations ===
- 1980 Brooch Boat Ivor's contribution to Morgan Fisher's Miniatures LP. A compilation of 51 one minute masterpieces by 51 different artists (Cherry Red)
- 2005 An Elpee and Two Epees (the Decca recordings)
- 2012 Essential Masters 1959-1961 (Comedy Classics, the Decca recordings in a different order)
- 2017 Gruts For Tea Again (Coda)

=== Video ===
- 2005 Looking for Truth with a Pin, and Cutler's Last Stand documentary and live performance (Claptrap)

== Bibliography ==
=== Poetry ===
- Many Flies Have Feathers (1973). Trigram Press.
- A Flat Man (1977). Trigram Press. ISBN 0-85465-053-9
- Private Habits (1981). Arc Publications. ISBN 0-902771-89-2
- LARGE et Puffy (1984). Arc Publications. ISBN 0-902771-70-1
- Fresh Carpet (1986). Arc Publications. ISBN 0-902771-68-X
- A Nice Wee Present from Scotland (1988). Arc Publications. ISBN 0-902771-73-6
- A Fly Sandwich and Other Menu (1991). Methuen. ISBN 0-413-65940-2
- Is That Your Flap, Jack? (1992). Arc Publications. ISBN 0-946407-76-2
- A Stuggy Pren (1994). Arc Publications. ISBN 0-946407-94-0
- A Wet Handle (1996). Arc Publications. ISBN 1-900072-06-8
- South American Bookworms (1999). Arc Publications. ISBN 1-900072-35-1
- Under the spigot (2001). Arc Publications. ISBN 1-900072-66-1
- Scots Wa' Straw (2003). Arc Publications. ISBN 1-900072-94-7
- Ivor Cutler: Selected Poems (2026). Hoorgi House Publishing. ISBN 978-1-915428-02-8

=== Prose ===
- Gruts (1962). Museum Press.
- Cockadoodledon't!!! (1966). Dennis Dobson.
- Life in a Scotch Sitting Room, Vol.2 (1984). Methuen. ISBN 0-413-73580-X
- Gruts (1986). Methuen. ISBN 0-413-40810-8
- Fremsley (1987). Methuen. ISBN 0-413-15540-4
- Glasgow Dreamer (1990). Methuen. ISBN 0-413-73600-8
- Life in a Scotch Sitting Room, Vol.2 (2022). Hoorgi House Publishing. ISBN 978-1-915428-00-4
- Gruts, and Other Wireless Menu: Collected Radio Scripts (2023). Hoorgi House Publishing. ISBN 978-1-915428-01-1

=== Children's books ===
- Meal One. (1971) Armada Lions Edition (1988)
- Balooky Klujypop. (1975) Heinemann.
- The Animal House. (1976) Armada Lions.
- The Vermillion Door (1984). Walker Books.
- The Pomegranate Door (1984). Walker Books.
- Herbert the Chicken (1984). Walker Books.
- Herbert the Elephant (1984). Walker Books.
- Herbert the Questionmark (1984). Walker Books.
- Herbert the Herbert (1984). Walker Books.
- One and a Quarter (1987). ISBN 0-233-98060-1
- Herbert: 5 Stories (1988). Walker Books. ISBN 0-7445-4778-4
- Grape Zoo (1991). Walker Books. ISBN 0-7445-2327-3
- Doris the Hen (1992). Heinemann. ISBN 0-434-93354-6
- The New Dress (1995). The Bodley Head. ISBN 0-370-31873-0

=== Other ===
- Befriend a Bacterium: Stickies by Ivor Cutler (1992). Pickpocket Books. ISBN 1-873422-11-3 (A collection of stickers that Cutler used to hand out to people).

== DVD video ==
- Looking for Truth with a Pin (BBC Four documentary, 2005)
- "I'm going in a field" - musical performance/outtake on the Magical Mystery Tour Blu-ray. (2012)
