= Gruts =

Studio album by Ivor Cutler
- Released: 1986
- Genre: Spoken word
- Label: Rough Trade

Ivor Cutler chronology
Prince Ivor (1986)	Gruts (1986)	A Wet Handle (1997)

Professional ratings
Review scores
Source	Rating
Allmusic	link

Gruts is an album by Ivor Cutler, originally released in 1986 on Rough Trade Records.

== Track listing ==
1. "I'm Happy"
2. "Gruts for Tea"
3. "A Red Flower"
4. "Shoplifters"
5. "How to Make a Friend"
6. "Fish Fright"
7. "Darling, Will You Marry Me Twice"
8. "Scratch My Back"
9. "Egg Meat"
10. "Mud"
11. "Old Cups of Tea"
12. "The Judge's Parcel"
13. "I Had a Little Boat"
14. "The Hoorgi House"
15. "A Steady Job"
16. "In My Room There Sits a Box"
17. "The Dirty Dinner"
