= Permanent Sleep =

Studio album by Lowlife
- Released: August 1986
- Recorded: June–July 1986
- Studio: Palladium Studios, Edinburgh
- Genre: Post-punk, dream pop, gothic rock
- Label: Nightshift
- Producer: Keith Mitchell, Lowlife

Lowlife chronology
Rain (1985)	Permanent Sleep (1986)	Diminuendo (1987)

Professional ratings
Review scores
Source	Rating
AllMusic	4/5 stars

Permanent Sleep is the debut studio album by Scottish post-punk band Lowlife. It was released in 1986 in Scotland by the independent music record label Nightshift Records.

== Background ==
Permanent Sleep was recorded at Palladium Studios in Edinburgh, Scotland during June–July 1986.

== Track listing ==
All tracks are written by Lowlife (Craig Lorentson, Stuart Everest, Will Heggie and Grant McDowall)

Side A
No.	Title	Length
1.	"Coward's Way"	3:54
2.	"As It Happens"	5:04
3.	"Mother Tongue"	3:14
4.	"Wild Swan"	4:40

Side B
No.	Title	Length
1.	"Permanent Sleep"	4:00
2.	"A Year Past July"	3:37
3.	"The Betting and Gaming Act 1964"	3:36
4.	"Do We Party"	4:34

2006 CD reissue bonus tracks
No.	Title	Length
9.	"Sometime: Something" (from Rain EP)	4:34
10.	"Reflections of I" (from Rain EP)	4:05
11.	"Gallery of Shame" (from Rain EP)	5:17
12.	"Sense of Fondness" (from Rain EP)	4:25
13.	"Hail Ye" (from Rain EP)	3:15
14.	"Again and Again" (from Rain EP)	4:04
15.	"From Side to Side (Version)"	4:11

== Reissue ==
The 2006 reissue by LTM Recordings was augmented by seven bonus tracks: the six-song EP Rain (1985) and a slightly different version of the track "From Side to Side", taken from the band's 1987 Diminuendo album.

== Personnel ==
Lowlife

- Craig Lorentson – vocals, production
- Stuart Everest – guitar, production
- Will Heggie – bass guitar, production
- Grant McDowall – drums, production

Technical

- Keith Mitchell – production
