= Godhead (album) =

Studio album by Lowlife
- Released: 1990
- Recorded: Summer of 1989
- Studio: Pet Sound Studios, Glasgow
- Genre: Alternative rock, dream pop, post-punk
- Length: 38:34 (original edition)/57:35 (2006 CD reissue)
- Label: Nightshift Records; LTM
- Producer: Ted Blakeway, Lowlife

Lowlife chronology
Black Sessions and Demos (1988)	Godhead (1990)	From a Scream to a Whisper (1990)

Professional ratings
Review scores
Source	Rating
AllMusic	3.5/5 stars

Godhead was Lowlife's third album, released in 1990 in Scotland on Nightshift Records, an independent music record label. The LP had been recorded at Pet Sounds Studios in Glasgow, Scotland. Prior to the recording of the album, original guitarist Stuart Everest had been asked to leave the group by the other band members, and was replaced by Hamish McIntosh. LTM Recordings reissued much of the band's entire back catalogue on CD, and released Godhead in August 2006, with five bonus tracks taken from the band's unreleased "Black Sessions" demo album.

The album received critical acclaim, but not a significant amount of mainstream attention. Martin Aston, of Music Week said of the album: "Lowlife's Godhead takes us back to that classic case of a band who never reap enough acclaim because they won't play the game, but they deserve serious attention" The Catalogue gave the album 4 stars, stating: "Lowlife cast aside past references and perceptions with the most evocatively impressive music. It would be unforgivable if this album remains totally unnoticed"

== Track listing ==
All tracks were written by Will Heggie, Craig Lorentson, Hamish McIntosh and Grant McDowall

1. "In Thankful Hands" - 3:43
2. "Where I Lay, I'll Lie" - 3:52
3. "Marjory's Dream" - 3:19
4. "I Don't Talk to Me" - 3:05
5. "Drowning Leaves" - 2:18
6. "Bittersweet" - 4:12
7. "River of Woe" - 3:01
8. "I the Cheated" - 3:25
9. "Missing the Kick" - 3:45
10. "Forever Filthy" - 3:43
11. "Neverending Shroud" 4:05

Bonus Tracks on 2006 CD Reissue (from "The Black Sessions" demos):

1. "The Beggar's Burning Bush" – 3:41
2. "Moved to Tears" – 3:54
3. "Acrid Tongue" – 2:43
4. "River of Woe" – 3:35
5. "Where I Lay, I'll Lie" – 4:15

== Personnel ==
Lowlife

- Craig Lorentson - vocals
- Hamish McIntosh (credited as "Fuel") - guitar, co-lead vocals on "In Thankful Hands"
- Will Heggie - bass guitar
- Grant McDowall - drums

Additional personnel

- Paul Baggy - additional keyboards and programming
- Steve Swinney - artwork
- Ted Blakeway - production
- Brian Guthrie - management
- Pierre Vale - digital remastering (2006 reissue)
