= Eternity Road: Reflections of Lowlife 85–95 =

Eternity Road: Reflections of Lowlife 85-95

Compilation album by Lowlife
- Released: 2006
- Recorded: Scotland
- Genres: Post-punk, alternative rock, dream pop
- Label: LTM
- Producer: Various

Lowlife chronology
| Gush (1995) | Eternity Road: Reflections of Lowlife 85-95 (2006) |

Professional ratings
Review scores
| Source | Rating |
|---|---|
| AllMusic | 4.5/5 stars |

Eternity Road: Reflections of Lowlife 85–95 is a compilation album by Lowlife, released in 2006 by LTM Recordings as part of their re-release of the band's entire back catalogue. It served as an introduction to the band and spanned their entire career. Allmusic gave the album "4.5" stars (out of 5) and noted, "Eternity Road taken as a whole is so shockingly good that it's practically astonishing at how the group never gained greater attention or cachet during its lifetime -- in retrospect they easily deserve mention alongside groups like The Sound and most especially The Chameleons."

== Track listing ==
1. "Sometime, Something"
2. "Again and Again"
3. "Coward's Way"
4. "Permanent Sleep"
5. "The Betting & Gaming Act 1964"
6. "Hollow Gut"
7. "Ragged Rise to Tumbledown"
8. "From Side To Side"
9. "Eternity Road" (7" version)
10. "Swing"
11. "Ramafied"
12. "Where I Lay, I'll Lie"
13. "I Don't Talk to Me"
14. "I The Cheated"
15. "My Mother's Fatherly Father"
16. "Suddenly Violently Random"
17. "Give Up Giving Up"
18. "Truth in Needles"
19. "Swell"
