= Diminuendo (album) =

Studio album by Lowlife
- Released: May 1987
- Studio: Palladium Studios, Edinburgh
- Genre: Post-punk, dream pop
- Length: 58:41 (2006 Reissue)
- Label: LTM
- Producer: Keith Mitchell, Lowlife

Lowlife chronology
Permanent Sleep (1986)	Diminuendo (1987)	Black Sessions and Demos (1988)

Professional ratings
Review scores
Source	Rating
AllMusic	4/5 stars

Diminuendo is the second album by Lowlife, was released in 1987 in Scotland on the independent label Nightshift Records. The LP was recorded at Palladium Studios in Edinburgh, Scotland, and released in May.

In 2006, LTM Recordings reissued it as a CD with six bonus tracks: two songs from the "Vain Delights" 12" single (1986) and three from the Swirl It Swings EP (1986). The sixth bonus track is "Ramified", which had been specially recorded by the band for Underground Magazine and provided on a free cassette that was included with the debut issue of that publication in 1987.

== Track listing ==
All tracks written by Will Heggie, Craig Lorentson, Stuart Everest and Grant McDowall

1. "A Sullen Sky" – 4:11
2. "Big Uncle Ugliness" – 4:06
3. "Ragged Rise To Tumbledown" – 3:49
4. "From Side to Side" – 4:26
5. "Off Pale Yellow" – 4:00
6. "Tongue Tied and Twisted" – 3:56
7. "Licking One's Wounds" – 4:34
8. "Wonders Will Never Cease" – 3:20
9. "Given To Dreaming" – 3:38

=== Bonus tracks on 2006 CD reissue ===
10. "Hollow Gut" – 4:16
11. "Permanent Sleep" (Steel Mix) – 4:16
12. "Eternity Road" (12" Mix) – 3:57
13. "Swing" – 3:44
14. "Colours Blue" – 3:22
15. "Ramified" – 4:13

== Personnel ==
Lowlife

- Craig Lorentson - vocals
- Stuart Everest - guitar
- Will Heggie - bass guitar
- Grant McDowall - drums
