= Velvet Donkey =

Studio album by Ivor Cutler
- Released: 1975
- Recorded: 1975
- Genre: Spoken word
- Length: 47:03
- Label: Virgin

Ivor Cutler chronology
Dandruff (1974)	Velvet Donkey (1975)	Jammy Smears (1976)

Professional ratings
Review scores
Source	Rating
AllMusic	3/5 stars

Velvet Donkey is an album by Ivor Cutler, originally released in 1975 on Virgin Records. Cutler is joined on the record by Fred Frith who plays viola on several tracks, and by Phyllis King who reads six of her own poems and short stories and is also credited with designing the album cover.

== Track listing ==
All tracks written by Ivor Cutler except where noted

Side one

1. "If Your Breasts" – 0:09
2. "I Got No Common Sense" – 0:34
3. "Useful Cat" – 0:27 (King)
4. "Oho My Eyes" – 1:30
5. "The Dirty Dinner" – 3:34
6. "Yellow Fly" – 1:37
7. "Mother's Love" – 0:25 (King)
8. "The Meadows Go" – 1:11
9. "Phonic Poem" – 0:47
10. "Life in a Scotch Sitting Room Vol. 2, Ep. 2" – 3:40
11. "Birdswing" – 0:49
12. "Nobody Knows" – 1:54
13. "Uneventful Day" – 0:31 (King)
14. "Little Black Buzzer" – 1:53
15. "Bread and Butter" – 0:42

Side two

1. "A Nuance" – 0:35
2. "Go and Sit upon the Grass" – 2:09
3. "The Even Keel" – 0:37
4. "Pearly Gleam" – 1:54
5. "The Best Thing" – 0:22 (King)
6. "Life in a Scotch Sitting Room Vol. 2, Ep. 7" – 3:34
7. "Once upon a Time" – 0:49
8. "There's Got to Be Something" – 2:01
9. "The Purposeful Culinary Implements" – 1:10
10. "Gee, Amn't I Lucky" – 1:34
11. "The Curse" – 2:07
12. "I Think Very Deeply" – 0:54
13. "I, Slowly" – 0:23 (King)
14. "Sleepy Old Snake" – 2:33
15. "Titchy Digits" – 0:32
16. "The Stranger" – 6:00 (King)
