= Lowlife (band) =

Scottish alternative rock-dream pop band

- left to right, Stuart Everest, Will Heggie, Craig Lorentson, Grant McDowall

Background information
- Origin: Grangemouth, Scotland
- Genres: Post-punk; gothic rock; dream pop; indie pop
- Years active: 1985–1997
- Labels: Nightshift Records; Anoise Annoys; LTM
- Past members: Craig Lorentson; Stuart Everest; Will Heggie; Grant McDowall

Lowlife were a Scottish post-punk band, active from 1985 to 1997, formed from the earlier act Dead Neighbours. The band was founded by vocalist Craig Lorentson and former Cocteau Twins bassist Will Heggie after his departure from that group. Their sound was described as a "dark hybrid of the Cocteau Twins and Joy Division/New Order."

== Pre Lowlife ==
Dead Neighbours were an early-1980s psychobilly band from Grangemouth, Scotland, originally consisting of Craig Lorentson (vocals), David Steel (bass), Ronnie Buchanan (guitar), and Grant McDowall (drums). The group were managed by Brian Guthrie, brother of Robin Guthrie of Cocteau Twins, and had recorded an album, Harmony in Hell (1982), that briefly hit the lower regions of the UK independent record charts.

In 1983, Steel left Dead Neighbours in the middle of recording the band's second album, Strangedays/Strangeways. Upon learning that Cocteau Twins' founding member and bassist Will Heggie had recently departed that band (after a lengthy and reportedly difficult European tour), Guthrie asked Heggie to help Dead Neighbours out in finishing the album's recording and join them on a tour opening for Johnny Thunders. Heggie agreed and, after the album was completed and the tour was done, he stayed on and began rehearsing new material with the band. Guthrie noticed that with Heggie, the entire chemistry of the group suddenly changed and they began forging a completely new, atmospheric sound very different from their original Cramps-influenced beginnings. Apparently unhappy with the direction they were clearly aiming for, Buchanan abruptly departed the band. A new guitarist was brought in, Stuart Everest, who adapted quickly to the band's updated vision. In 1984, the group retired the Dead Neighbours moniker for good and rechristened themselves as Lowlife.

== 1980s ==
In 1985, Lowlife recorded Rain, a six-song mini-album. It was released on Nightshift Records, a label formed by Guthrie specifically to release material by the band. All subsequent Lowlife LPs, singles, and EPs would appear on Nightshift, with the exception of their final album, Gush, which was released on the Anoise Annoys Records label. Rain was modestly successful, receiving generally positive reviews and sold well enough to appear on several independent charts in the UK, US and France.

In 1986, the band's debut album, Permanent Sleep was released and received critical praise from several UK and US music publications. Trouser Press noted that the album "... delves deeper into instrumental and vocal textures, with layers of strummed and picked guitar and slippery bass chords (shades of New Order) dominating the sound. Despite Lowlife's concentration on ambience, the affecting "Wild Swan" is a lovely song, punctuated by repeated guitar triplets fluttering overhead." Melody Maker said "Lowlife practice a mystical form of musical alchemy, with crystalline perfection." Sounds gave the album four stars and commented "Lowlife construct their deep atmospheres through hypnotically mysterious songs…"

An EP, Vain Delights, was released in late 1986. The production of the EP was financed by the band's new association with Working Week, a recently formed publishing company run by Jeff Chegwin, twin brother of television presenter Keith Chegwin. Record Mirror called the release "Profound, melancholic, and reaches the parts other ephemeral pieces of plastic cannot reach." A song from the EP, "Hollow Gut", received airplay on BBC Radio by both John Peel and Janice Long (Jeff Chegwin's sister), and a music video for the song made appearances on UK television, including DEF II.

The band took six months to record their second album, Diminuendo. Released in 1987, the album received extremely positive reviews and is generally considered to be the band's finest full-length effort. Q magazine gave it four stars and observed, "A further phase in Lowlife's refinement…Evocative and dramatic. But never overbearing". Melody Maker noted, "Lowlife emerge from a distant eerie grace, out of an echo or pause with unworldly drama. The isolation, resonance of this music can bring to mind the notion of the Music of the Spheres." Music Week said, "Diminuendo is a landmark album, bustling with feeling, dripping with emotion and soft to the touch." Trouser Press stated, "The aptly titled and excellent Diminuendo reduces Lowlife's volume by stripping the arrangements of their thickening ingredients, leaving only the bass, simple drums and frugal bits of guitar and keyboards to support Lorentson's increasingly ambitious and musical vocals."

Subsequent to the release of Diminuendo, the group underwent a lengthy UK tour as support to headliners The Go-Betweens. The tour helped bring Lowlife to a wider audience, and culminated in a critically well-received show at The Town & Country Club in London, a performance which Guthrie would later describe as "possibly the best set of their career".

Also in 1987, a live performance of the band specifically shot for BBC Scotland was broadcast on television, and a single ("Eternity Road") and an EP (Swirl It Swings) were released.

In 1988, Lowlife rehearsed new material and Guthrie presented demos of some songs to Working Music, which was associated at the time with Chappell Music. Stephen Fellows, vocalist and guitarist of the Comsat Angels, heard the demos and agreed to produce the album, but this was dependent on whether Working Music and Chappell Music would commit to finance the recording. However, while discussions were underway, Warner Bros. Records absorbed Chappell Music, and the Warner regime passed on the option of signing Lowlife. Working Music subsequently dropped the band.

The band started undergoing a level of internal strife. Guitarist Everest was asked by the other band members to leave, for reasons never made clear. Hamish McIntosh was brought into the group as Everest's replacement.

In 1989, the band's third album, Godhead was released. Critical response was slightly less effusive this time, with Music Week noting that the album "…takes us back to that classic case of a band who never reap enough acclaim because they won’t play the game. But they deserve serious attention." Trouser Press was unimpressed: "The misnamed Godhead lacks the emotional drive that sparks all of Lowlife's other albums and winds up labored and dull, a collection of unaffecting songs that plod – even at brisk tempos."

== 1990s ==
In early 1990, following a football match accident in which he lost a finger, McDowall decided to retire from the music business and left the band. McIntosh also left, to pursue a career with his own band, Fuel. New guitarists Robin James Hurt and Hugh Duggie and drummer Martin Fleming were brought in as replacements. At the same time Ian Stewart, who was playing with Duggie and Fleming in the band Mutiny Strings, also joined for a brief time on second bass. That same year, while the band adjusted to these most recent personnel changes, Nightshift issued a compilation album, From a Scream to a Whisper, consisting of previously released songs taken from the band's earlier singles and albums.

In 1991, Lowlife and Nightshift Records began experiencing a series of financial problems, brought on by the collapse of Rough Trade Distribution, which left small independent labels with far less options to have their various titles distributed to record stores. Guthrie had to borrow a substantial amount of money to finance the recording of the band's fourth album, San Antorium. The album received positive but unspectacular reviews, and the sales were no better or worse than their previous offerings. There were few live shows to support the release. The band's momentum had clearly stagnated.

It would be four years later before the group got around to recording their fifth, and final, album, Gush. The recording sessions were apparently by a very professional but unenthusiastic band, and the extremely muted critical reviews reflected this lack of excitement. As with San Antorium, Lowlife did not tour to support Gush.

In 1997, after playing fewer and fewer shows to progressively smaller audiences, and with family commitments an ever-growing concern for all band members, Lowlife effectively called it quits, although there was never any "official" announcement of a breakup.

== 2000s ==
In 2006, all of Lowlife's back catalogue (except Gush) was re-released on CD by LTM, augmented with multiple bonus tracks and extensive liner notes by Brian Guthrie.

The band's website, Permanent Sleep, reported that Craig Lorentson died on 4 June 2010, at the age of 44 after a period of liver and kidney problems. Lorentson's funeral took place on 11 June 2010.

== Discography ==
=== Studio albums ===
- Permanent Sleep (1986)
- Diminuendo (1987)
- Godhead (1989)
- San Antorium (1991)
- Gush (1995)

=== Compilation albums ===
- Black Sessions and Demos (1988) (Commercially unreleased demos)
- From a Scream to a Whisper (1990)
- Eternity Road: Reflections of Lowlife 85–95 (2006)

=== Singles and EPs ===
- Rain (1985) EP
- Vain Delights (1986) EP
- Eternity Road (1987) Single
- Swirl It Swings (1987) EP

== Main source ==
Guthrie, Brian, Eternity Road: Reflections of Lowlife 85-95 (2006) CD Liner notes, LTM.
