= A Wet Handle =

Studio album by Ivor Cutler
- Released: 1997
- Genre: Spoken word
- Label: Creation

Ivor Cutler chronology
| Gruts (1986) | A Wet Handle (1997) | A Flat Man (1998) |

Professional ratings
Review scores
| Source | Rating |
|---|---|
| Allmusic | 2.5/5 stars |
| NME | 7/10 |

A Wet Handle is an album by Ivor Cutler, originally released in 1997 on Creation Records.

== Track listing ==
(all by Cutler)

1. "Her Tissues" (1:20)
2. "An American Drink" (0:29)
3. "One Day" (0:32)
4. "Out of Decency" (0:30)
5. "My Disposition" (1:10)
6. "No I Won't" (0:49)
7. "It's Stupid" (0:36)
8. "By the Bush" (1:04)
9. "The Thatcher Generation" (0:58)
10. "My Vest" (0:31)
11. "Goosie" (1:03)
12. "When It Wants" (0:44)
13. "Her Zimmer" (0:24)
14. "The Farmer's Wife" (0:26)
15. "Bets" (0:55)
16. "Just in Time" (1:09)
17. "The Specific Sundry" (1:50)
18. "Just Listen" (0:38)
19. "The Breaking Point" (0:38)
20. "Spring Back" (0:35)
21. "Hell" (0:25)
22. "A Man" (0:14)
23. "The Place" (0:37)
24. "Hello Explorer!" (0:38)
25. "Not Asking" (0:40)
26. "His Slow Hand" (0:32)
27. "Local Creatures" (1:00)
28. "Heptagon" (0:37)
29. "Where's My Razor?" (0:54)
30. "One Side" (0:33)
31. "Singing to My Foot" (0:35)
32. "Ride Off" (0:26)
33. "A Great Albatross" (0:33)
34. "A Berd" (0:26)
35. "Half and Half" (0:40)
36. "Get off the Road" (0:42)
37. "A Fine Example" (0:32)
38. "Faces of People" (0:29)
39. "Stand Well Clear" (0:44
40. "Naughty Sydney" (0:50)
41. "Perverse" (0:51)
42. "The Bargain" (0:43)
43. "Space Sandwich" (0:44)
44. "Baked Beetles" (1:07)
45. "Taking Hands" (0:34)
46. "Entities" (0:52)
47. "It" (0:20)
48. "A Kitchen Knife" (0:44)
49. "Not from Hens" (0:43)
50. "The Carpet" (0:27)
51. "Beyond" (0:36)
52. "The Way Out" (0:27)
53. "To Take" (0:15)
54. "Do You Call That Living?" (0:29)
55. "On Holiday" (0:26)
56. "The Taste of Gunny" (0:34)
57. "A Blunt Yashmak" (0:42)
58. "The Kiddies" (0:29)
59. "I Give Up" (0:56)
60. "My Window Box" (1:08)
61. "A Pain in the Neck" (1:47)
62. "Not Even" (0:16)
63. "Tablets" (1:00)
64. "Flat Thin Chests" (0:43)
65. "A Good Girl" (0:41)
66. "He Himself" (0:57)
67. "Uncrossing Her Legs" (0:47)
68. "Crete/Greece" (0:31)
69. "Squeaky" (0:46)
70. "Oddly Comforting" (1:06)
71. "An Original Sweet" (0:31)
72. "The Bridge" (1:00)
73. "Butterfly" (0:50)
74. "Snaps" (0:18)
75. "Just" (0:23)
76. "Hummed and Hawed" (0:56)
77. "Thursday" (0:25)
78. "A Cosy Nest" :22
79. "A Slice of Seedcake" (0:47)
80. "What a Funny Room" (0:37)
81. "Heavy Rock" (0:34)
82. "The Whole Forest" (0:41)
83. "Little Hetty" (0:23)
