= List of Oricon number-one singles of 1986 =

The highest-selling singles in Japan are ranked in the Oricon Singles Chart, which in 1986 was published in what was then called Oricon Weekly magazine. The data are compiled by Oricon based on each singles' physical sales. This list includes the singles that reached the number one place on that chart in 1986.

== Oricon Weekly Singles Chart ==
Issue date	Song	Artist(s)	Ref.
January 6	"Koi ni Ochite: Fall in Love"	Akiko Kobayashi	
January 13	"Fuyu no Opera-Glass"	Eri Nitta	
January 20	"Fuyu no Opera-Glass"	Eri Nitta	
January 27	"Fuyu no Opera-Glass"	Eri Nitta	
February 3	"Banana no Namida"	Ushiroyubi Sasaregumi	
February 10	"Kuchibiru Network"	Yukiko Okada	
February 17	"Desire (Jōnetsu)"	Akina Nakamori	
February 24	Broken Sunset	Momoko Kikuchi	
March 3	"Jā ne"	Onyanko Club	
March 10	"Kisetsu Hazure no Koi"	Akie Yoshizawa	
March 17	"Kisetsu Hazure no Koi"	Akie Yoshizawa	
March 24	"My Revolution"	Misato Watanabe	
March 31	"Aoi Station"	Sonoko Kawai	
April 7	"Aoi Station"	Sonoko Kawai	
April 14	"Watashi wa Rika-chan"	Nyangilas	
April 21	"Koi no Rope wo Hodokanai de"	Eri Nitta	
April 28	"Koi no Rope wo Hodokanai de"	Eri Nitta	
May 5	"Otto CHIKAN!"	Onyanko Club	
May 12	"Zō-san no Scanty"	Ushiroyubi Sasaregumi	
May 19	"Natsu wo Matenai"	Sayuri Kokushō	
May 26	"Natsu Iro Kataomoi"	Momoko Kikuchi	
June 2	"Kaze no Invitation"	Satomi Fukunaga	
June 9	"Gypsy Queen"	Akina Nakamori	
June 16	"Song for U.S.A"	The Checkers	
June 23	"Ajisai Bashi"	Sanae Jonouchi	
June 30	"Jibun de Yūnomo Nan Desukeredo"	Nyangilas	
July 7	"Cinderella-tachi e no Dengon"	Mamiko Takai	
July 14	"Saikai no Labyrinth"	Sonoko Kawai	
July 21	"Diamond Eyes"	Shonentai	
July 28	"Hitomi ni Yakusoku"	Minayo Watanabe	
August 4	"Osaki ni Shitsurei"	Onyanko Club	
August 11	"Fushigi na Tejina no Yoni"	Eri Nitta	
August 18	"Skipped Beat"	Kuwata Band	
August 25	"Noble Red no Toki"	Sayuri Kokushō	
September 1	"Aozora no Kakera"	Yuki Saito	
September 8	"Nagisa no Kagikakko"	Ushiroyubi Sasaregumi	
September 15	"Say Yes!"	Momoko Kikuchi	
September 22	"Kagami no Naka no Watashi"	Akie Yoshizawa	
September 29	"Melody"	Mamiko Takai	
October 6	"Fin"	Akina Nakamori	
October 13	"Cha-Cha-Cha"	Akemi Ishii	
October 20	"Shin Kōkyū Shite"	Marina Watanabe	
October 27	"Yuki no Kaerimichi"	Minayo Watanabe	
November 3	"Kanashii Yoru wo Tomete"	Sonoko Kawai	
November 10	"Koi wa Question"	Onyanko Club	
November 17	"One Day"	Kuwata Band	
November 24	"Naisho de Love Story"	Eri Nitta	
December 1	"Waza-Ari!"	Ushiroyubi Sasaregumi	
December 8	"Ballad no Yoni Nemure"	Shonentai	
December 15	"Ano Natsu no Bike"	Sayuri Kokushō	
December 22	"Naimono Nedari no I Want You"	C-C-B	
December 29	"Yakusoku"	Mamiko Takai	

== See also ==
- 1986 in Japanese music
