= Prince Ivor (Ivor Cutler album) =

Studio album by Ivor Cutler
- Released: 1986
- Genre: Spoken word
- Label: Rough Trade

Ivor Cutler chronology
Privilege (1983)	Prince Ivor (1986)	Gruts (1986)

Professional ratings
Review scores
Source	Rating
Allmusic	link

Prince Ivor is a double album by Ivor Cutler, originally released in 1986 on Rough Trade Records.

The album's title should be pronounced "Prance eeVOR" (cf. Prince Igor). It contains 12 plays written for Radio 3 between January 1979 and March 1983.

== Track listing ==
(all tracks written by Ivor Cutler)

=== Record 1 Side 1 ===
1. "Silence"
2. "Ivor Cutler and ... the Mermaid"

=== Record 1 Side 2 ===
1. "Ivor Cutler and ... the Mole"
2. "Ivor Cutler and a Barber"
3. "Ivor Cutler and the Paperseller"
4. "Ivor Cutler and a Storeman"

=== Record 2 Side 1 ===
1. "Ivor Cutler and ... a Princess"
2. "A Miner Is Approached by Ivor Cutler"
3. "Ivor Cutler and ... his Dad"

=== Record 2 Side 2 ===
1. "A Sheet Metal Worker Is Approached by Ivor Cutler"
2. "Ivor Cutler and a Small Holder"
3. "Prince Ivor"

== Album credits ==
- Ivor Cutler: keyboards, voices, main performer, vocals
- Bill Wallis: voices
