= Mark Goulston =

American psychiatrist and consultant (1948-2023)

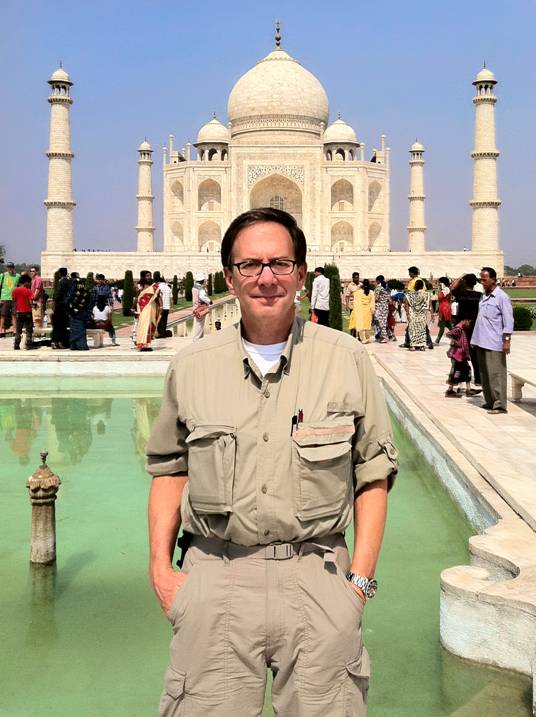
- Goulston at the Taj Mahal in 2014
- Born: February 21, 1948; Boston, Massachusetts
- Died: December 30, 2023 (aged 75)
- Education: M.D., Boston University; B.A., University of California, Berkeley
- Occupations: psychiatrist, author, consultant
- Website: MarkGoulston.com

Mark Goulston (February 21, 1948 – December 30, 2023) was an American psychiatrist, executive coach and consultant who had worked with Fortune 500 companies, universities, and other organizations. He was the inventor and developer of the process called Surgical Empathy whereby, using targeted and focused empathy, one is able to break through to people and free them from internal emotional and psychological blocks that can impair their functioning, well-being and satisfaction in life.

== Early life ==
Goulston was born in Boston, MA, to Irving Goulston, who rose from bookkeeper to controller and CFO at United Liquors, and Ruth Goulston, who was a homemaker and shop owner. He skipped a grade and graduated early from Newton South High School. He attended the University of Vermont from 1965 to 1966 and then transferred to the University of California, Berkeley, where he received his B.A. in 1969 with a major in Zoology.

From there, he went on to a year of graduate school in Zoology at the University of Massachusetts, Amherst from 1969–1970 and then on to medical school at Boston University School of Medicine (BUSM), where he took two non-consecutive medical leaves of absence. He attributes this to untreated depression.

During his second leave of absence, he took a three-month medical student elective at the Menninger Psychiatric Clinic in Topeka, Kansas, where he worked with schizophrenics. He learned that listening and empathy in addition to drugs and ECT were key to addressing even severe mental illness. He then returned to BUSM and completed his MD degree in 1976.

Goulston completed an internship at Harbor General Hospital in Torrance, California, and his psychiatric residency at UCLA's Neuropsychiatric Institute under supervision and then mentorship of suicidologist Edwin Shneidman. He then became an assistant clinical professor of psychiatry at UCLA, where he served for over 20 years.

== Career ==
Goulston started a private practice. It specialized in suicide, death, and dying, including making house calls, and working with families and couples. After doing psychiatric house calls to dying patients and their family members, he worked with surviving families and their businesses.

That expanded to his being a consultant, speaker, trainer and coach to such organizations as IBM, Goldman Sachs, Merrill Lynch, Xerox, Deutsche Bank, Hyatt, Accenture, AstraZeneca, British Airways, Sodexo, ESPN, Kodak, FedEx, YPO, YPOWPO India, Association for Corporate Growth, FBI, Los Angeles County District Attorney, White & Case, Seyfarth Shaw, UCLA Anderson School of Management, USC and Pepperdine University.

In 2015, Goulston founded and became CEO of the Goulston Group. Companies and organizations hired the Goulston Group when they want to significantly increase "buy in" and sustained engagement from customers/clients, investors and talent they are hoping to attract.

In August 2019, Goulston launched @wmystglobal, a global movement to combat disconnect, loneliness and unhappiness using the power of tactical kindness.

He was the co-founder of the Deeper Coaching Institute a division of On Global Leadership.

== Advisory boards ==
Goulston sat on the board of advisors at HealthCorps (Dr. Mehmet Oz's foundation) and American Women Veterans, and he was a Fellow of the American Psychiatric Association. He was also the co-founder, co-curator and co-guardian of Heartfelt Leadership.

In 2015, Goulston became Chief Mentor and a principal at China Foundations and in 2016 he became a principal and Board Advisor to the transdisciplinary consulting firm Alchemy.

Until his death Goulston served on the Board of Advisors at: Healthcorps, BiasSync and No Worry No Tension Healthcare .

== Media ==
Goulston was interviewed, appeared in or and written for media outlets including: The New York Times, The Wall Street Journal, Forbes, Fortune, Los Angeles Times, CNN, MSNBC, and HLN. He also co-hosted the Zo Williams Morning Radio Show. In 2016, he became a co-host on It's Your Health with his day entitled, "Dr. G and Lisa" carried on NPR and commercial radio stations.

Beginning in late 2016, Goulston also began performing a one-man show, entitled "Steve Jobs Returns – How to Think Like a Visionary", that Goulston wrote, produced, directed and starred in.

In 2017, he began hosting the weekly Prison Letters with Dr. Mark Goulston podcast.

In October 2018, Goulston began hosting the "My Wakeup Call" weekly podcast where he interviews influencers about what matters most to them and there journey and personal wakeup calls to arriving at that commitment.

In March 2019, Goulston co-created and moderated a multi-honored documentary: Stay Alive: An Intimate Conversation about Suicide Prevention.

He was the host of My Wakeup Call a podcast where guests conversationally share their purpose and calling and their origin story and wakeup calls that led them there.

In 2022 Goulston became Executive Producer of the documentary, What I Wish My Parents Knew, a film directed by Jason Reid interviewing teenagers about their lowest points mentally and emotionally.

In 2023 became the co-host of, "Hurt Less, Live More," on UK Health Radio.

== Presentations ==
In October 2017, Goulston ventured to Moscow to provide a one-day training for Best Business Ideas to 400+ CEO's, managers from the Russian Federation and HR directors on the topic of his book, "Just Listen," whose Russian edition was, "I Hear You Through and Through". Related to that visit, Goulston was interviewed by the Russian business publication, RBC, in an article entitled, Managers Hate the Word "People" which resulted in a record 455,000 views.

In May 2019, Goulston presented a session at the International Academy of Mediators in Banff, Alberta and Canada.

In October 2019, Goulston returned to Moscow to give a presentation along with Nobel laureate Daniel Kahneman. This was partially because his most recent book, Talking to Crazy, which, when translated into Russian became How to Talk With Dicks, became a national bestseller and went viral.

In October 2019, Goulston presented "A Novel Approach to De-stigmatizing Mental Illness: Design Thinking Suicide Prevention" at the California Community College Mental Health and Wellness Fall Conference.

== Intellectual property ==
Goulston was co-developer of The Exam Performance Program, an eLearning course which teaches students how to be calm, confident and focused so they can perform better and score better on academic exams and standardized tests. The course has been developed to (I) improve student cognitive performance and test scores on academic exams and standardized tests, (II) improve student mindset, self-confidence, self-efficacy, motivation, engagement, retention and academic trajectory, (III) eliminate/prevent test-anxiety and "stereotype-threat", and (IV) motivate STEM achievement, especially in low-income/minority/female/foster-care student groups.

In 2021, he co-created the "Goulston-Vohra Happiness Scale," along with Dr. Sandeep Vohra. The digital scale measures an individual's emotional wellness and is very famous in India.

== "Surgical Empathy" ==
Surgical Empathy has been used to break through to suicidal teenagers and young adults, to help people including healthcare professionals recover from and in many cases heal from PTSD, and to assist organizations and companies with overcoming implicit bias.

One of the techniques in Surgical Empathy is the "Five Reallys" that Goulston learned from Lt. General Martin Steele, who employed it in helping transitioning U.S. Marines from 2006 to 2008. The "Five Reallys" is a technique where you listen empathically to what people are saying and keep repeating, "I understand that, but what's really going on?" According to the technique, people eventually reveal that and when they do and you just listen without rushing in to give them advice or a solution, they will often begin to cry with relief, calm down and be better able to think of solutions with you.

For more than twenty years, Goulston used Surgical Empathy as his principal approach as a psychiatrist with a focus on suicide prevention and none of his patients died by suicide. He was the co-creator and moderator of the documentary, "Stay Alive: A Personal Conversation about Suicide Prevention" which received accolades including: Winner, Award of Merit, IndieFEST Film Awards, May 2019.

His book, Just Listen, was an Amazon bestseller, has been translated into 24 languages, reached No. 1 in Munich and Shanghai, and became the basis of a 2010 PBS special. He was also on the Board of Advisors for the PBS film, "Cry for Help."

The Consumers Research Council three times named him one of America's top psychiatrists, including in 2011. For over 20 years, he has been Clinical Assistant Professor of Medicine at UCLA's Neuropsychiatric Institute. Goulston has appeared on Oprah, The Today Show, The Phil Donahue Show, CNN and hosted a PBS pledge drive special.

His column Solve Anything with Dr. Mark was nationally syndicated by Tribune Media Services. He blogged for the Huffington Post, Psychology Today, Fast Company and Business Insider, contributes to the Harvard Business Review and wrote a syndicated column for "Biz Journals". He was a TEDx speaker and frequently gives keynote speeches at women's conferences.

== Writing ==
=== Articles ===
Goulston was a contributing writer for Business Journals.

=== Books ===
- Goulston, M., & Goldberg, P. (1996). Get out of your own way : overcoming self-defeating behavior. Berkley Pub. Group.
- Goulston, M. (2006). Get Out of Your Own Way at Work--and Help Others Do the Same. Penguin.
- Goulston, M., & Goldberg, P. (2002). The 6 secrets of a lasting relationship : how to fall in love again--and stay there. The Berkley Pub. Group.
- Goulston, M. (2008). Post-traumatic stress disorder for dummies. Wiley Pub.
- Goulston, M., & Ullmen, J. B. (2013). Real influence : persuade without pushing and gain without giving in. American Management Association. This book was selected as the lead book for the American Management Association and one of the 30 Best Business Books for 2013 by Soundview Executive Summaries.
- Goulston, M. (2015). Just listen : discover the secret to getting through to absolutely anyone. Amacom.
- Goulston, M. (2015b). Talking to Crazy: How to Deal with the Irrational and Impossible People in Your Life. AMACOM. This became an Oprah featured book, and to be an Audie Awards 2016 Finalist.
- Boelkes, D., & Goulston, M. (2020). The WOW factor workplace : how to create a best place to work culture. Deb Boelkes.
- Boelkes, D., & Goulston, M. (2020a). Heartfelt Leadership. Business World Rising.
- Goulston, M., & Hendel, D. (2020). Why cope when you can heal? : how healthcare heroes of COVID-19 can recover from PTSD. Harper Horizon.
- Goulston, M., & Hendel, D. (2021). Trauma to Triumph: A Roadmap for Leading Through Disruption (and Thriving on the Other Side). HarperCollins Leadership.
- Consorte, D., Goulston, M., Hall, T., Hogan, K., & Sharpe, L. (2023). Back After Burnout: Master your BURNOUT RECOVERY with the MASHPLAY framework. Luminary Tiger.

== Awards ==
In April 2019, Goulston was honored with the First Dr. W. Mark Warfel Resilient Heart Award at the Healthcorp Annual Gala in NYC.

In 2022, Dr. Goulston was honored with "The Shine the Light Media Award," by the Los Angeles County Medical Association's Patient Care Foundation for his focus on bringing attention to mental health and teen suicide.

== Personal life ==
Goulston lived in Los Angeles with his wife and three children.

He died on December 30, 2023, due to an unforeseen infection during recovery from a bone marrow transplant. His family planned a recorded virtual memorial. After receiving a terminal diagnosis for lymphoma, Goulston reflected on the characteristics of a "good death" as defined by Dr. Ed Schneiderman of UCLA.
