= Airplay 100 (disambiguation) =

Airplay 100 may refer to:

- Airplay 100, national Romanian music chart since 2012
- Brasil Hot 100 Airplay, official music singles charts in Brazil. It has been compiled by Crowley Broadcast Analysis and published monthly by Billboard Brasil since the release of the magazine, in October 2009
- Hot 100 Airplay (Radio Songs), released weekly by Billboard magazine and measures the airplay of songs being played on radio stations throughout the United States across all musical genres
- Pop 100 Airplay, an earlier chart created in 2005 and released weekly by Billboard in the United States measuring mainstream radio airplay. It was one of the three component charts, along with the Hot 100 Singles Sales and Hot Digital Songs charts, that determined the chart positions of singles on the Pop 100 chart.

== See also ==
- List of Hot 100 Airplay number-one singles of the 1980s
- List of Hot 100 Airplay number-one singles of the 1990s
- List of Hot 100 Airplay number-one singles of the 2000s
- List of Hot 100 Airplay number-one singles of the 2010s
- List of Airplay 100 number ones of the 2010s
- List of Airplay 100 number ones of the 2020s
