= List of Cash Box Top 100 number-one singles of 1986 =

These are the number-one singles of 1986 according to the Top 100 Singles chart in Cash Box magazine.

Key
†	Indicates best-performing single of 1986

Issue date	Song	Artist
January 4	"Say You, Say Me"	Lionel Richie
January 11	"Say You, Say Me"	Lionel Richie
January 18	"Say You, Say Me"	Lionel Richie
January 25	"That's What Friends Are For"	Dionne Warwick & Friends
February 1	"That's What Friends Are For"	Dionne Warwick & Friends
February 8	"That's What Friends Are For"	Dionne Warwick & Friends
February 15	"When the Going Gets Tough, the Tough Get Going"	Billy Ocean
February 22	"How Will I Know"	Whitney Houston
March 1	"Kyrie"	Mr. Mister
March 8	"Kyrie"	Mr. Mister
March 15	"Sara"	Starship
March 22	"These Dreams"	Heart
March 29	"Rock Me Amadeus"	Falco
April 5	"Rock Me Amadeus"	Falco
April 12	"Kiss"	Prince & Revolution
April 19	"Kiss"	Prince & Revolution
April 26	"Addicted To Love"	Robert Palmer
May 3	"Addicted To Love"	Robert Palmer
May 10	"West End Girls"	Pet Shop Boys
May 17	"Why Can't This Be Love"	Van Halen
May 24	"Greatest Love Of All"	Whitney Houston
May 31	"Greatest Love Of All"	Whitney Houston
June 7	"Live to Tell"	Madonna
June 14	"On My Own"	Patti LaBelle & Michael McDonald
June 21	"On My Own"	Patti LaBelle & Michael McDonald
June 28	"On My Own"	Patti LaBelle & Michael McDonald
July 5	"There'll Be Sad Songs (To Make You Cry)"	Billy Ocean
July 12	"There'll Be Sad Songs (To Make You Cry)"	Billy Ocean
July 19	"Invisible Touch"	Genesis
July 26	"Sledgehammer"	Peter Gabriel
August 2	"Sledgehammer"	Peter Gabriel
August 9	"Glory of Love"	Peter Cetera
August 16	"Papa Don't Preach"	Madonna
August 23	"Papa Don't Preach"	Madonna
August 30	"Higher Love" †	Steve Winwood
September 6	"Higher Love" †	Steve Winwood
September 13	"Take My Breath Away"	Berlin
September 20	"Stuck with You"	Huey Lewis and the News
September 27	"Stuck with You"	Huey Lewis and the News
October 4	"Stuck with You"	Huey Lewis and the News
October 11	"When I Think Of You"	Janet Jackson
October 18	"When I Think Of You"	Janet Jackson
October 25	"Typical Male"	Tina Turner
November 1	"True Colors"	Cyndi Lauper
November 8	"Amanda"	Boston
November 15	"Amanda"	Boston
November 22	"Amanda"	Boston
November 29	"Human"	The Human League
December 6	"You Give Love A Bad Name"	Bon Jovi
December 13	"The Way It Is"	Bruce Hornsby & Range
December 20	"Walk Like an Egyptian"	The Bangles
December 27	"Everybody Have Fun Tonight"	Wang Chung

== See also ==
- 1986 in music
- List of Hot 100 number-one singles of 1986 (U.S.)

== Sources ==
- http://members.aol.com/_ht_a/randypny4/cashbox/1986.html
- http://www.cashboxmagazine.com/archives/80s_files/1986.html
- https://web.archive.org/web/20060614052228/http://musicseek.info/no1hits/1986.htm
