= List of Hot 100 Airplay number-one singles of the 1980s =

The Hot 100 Airplay chart ranks the most frequently played songs on United States radio stations, published by Billboard magazine. The chart was introduced in the magazine's issue dated October 20, 1984. During the 1980s, 132 songs topped the chart.

== Number-one airplay hits ==
Issue date	Song	Artist(s)	Wks.
1984
October 20	"I Just Called to Say I Love You"	Stevie Wonder	3
November 10	"Wake Me Up Before You Go-Go"	Wham!	4
December 8	"Out of Touch"	Daryl Hall and John Oates	2
December 22	"Like a Virgin"	Madonna	5
1985
January 26	"You're the Inspiration"	Chicago	1
February 2	"I Want to Know What Love Is"	Foreigner	2
February 16	"Careless Whisper"	Wham! featuring George Michael	3
March 9	"Can't Fight This Feeling"	REO Speedwagon	3
March 30	"One More Night"	Phil Collins	2
April 13	"We Are the World"	USA for Africa	4
May 11	"Crazy for You"	Madonna	1
May 18	"Don't You (Forget About Me)"	Simple Minds	1
May 25	"Everything She Wants"	Wham!	2
June 8	"Everybody Wants to Rule the World"	Tears for Fears	2
June 22	"Sussudio"	Phil Collins	4
July 20	"Raspberry Beret"	Prince	1
July 27	"Everytime You Go Away"	Paul Young	1
August 3	"Shout"	Tears for Fears	3
August 24	"The Power of Love"	Huey Lewis and the News	3
September 14	"St. Elmo's Fire (Man in Motion)"	John Parr	1
September 21	"Money for Nothing"	Dire Straits	3
October 12	"Take On Me"	a-ha	2
October 26	"Part-Time Lover"	Stevie Wonder	3
November 16	"We Built This City"	Starship	2
November 30	"Separate Lives"	Phil Collins and Marilyn Martin	2
December 14	"Broken Wings"	Mr. Mister	1
December 21	"Say You, Say Me"	Lionel Richie	5
1986
January 25	"That's What Friends Are For"	Dionne and Friends	3
February 15	"How Will I Know"	Whitney Houston	2
March 1	"Kyrie"	Mr. Mister	2
March 15	"Sara"	Starship	1
March 22	"These Dreams"	Heart	1
March 29	"Rock Me Amadeus"	Falco	3
April 19	"Kiss"	Prince	2
May 3	"West End Girls"	Pet Shop Boys	2
May 17	"Greatest Love of All"	Whitney Houston	2
May 31	"Live to Tell"	Madonna	3
June 21	"On My Own"	Patti LaBelle and Michael McDonald	2
July 5	"There'll Be Sad Songs (To Make You Cry)"	Billy Ocean	1
July 12	"Invisible Touch"	Genesis	3
August 2	"Glory of Love"	Peter Cetera	2
August 16	"Papa Don't Preach"	Madonna	2
August 30	"Higher Love"	Steve Winwood	2
September 13	"Dancing on the Ceiling"	Lionel Richie	1
September 20	"Stuck with You"	Huey Lewis and the News	3
October 11	"When I Think of You"	Janet Jackson	2
October 25	"True Colors"	Cyndi Lauper	2
November 8	"Amanda"	Boston	3
November 29	"Human"	The Human League	1
December 6	"The Way It Is"	Bruce Hornsby and the Range	2
December 20	"Walk Like an Egyptian"	The Bangles	4
1987
January 17	"Shake You Down"	Gregory Abbott	1
January 24	"At This Moment"	Billy Vera and the Beaters	1
January 31	"Open Your Heart"	Madonna	2
February 14	"Livin' on a Prayer"	Bon Jovi	4
March 14	"Jacob's Ladder"	Huey Lewis and the News	1
March 21	"Lean on Me"	Club Nouveau	2
April 4	"Nothing's Gonna Stop Us Now"	Starship	3
April 25	"I Knew You Were Waiting (For Me)"	Aretha Franklin and George Michael	1
May 2	"(I Just) Died in Your Arms"	Cutting Crew	2
May 16	"With or Without You"	U2	3
June 6	"You Keep Me Hangin' On"	Kim Wilde	1
June 13	"Always"	Atlantic Starr	1
June 20	"Head to Toe"	Lisa Lisa and Cult Jam	1
June 27	"I Wanna Dance with Somebody (Who Loves Me)"	Whitney Houston	3
July 18	"Alone"	Heart	2
August 1	"Shakedown"	Bob Seger	1
August 8	"I Still Haven't Found What I'm Looking For"	U2	1
August 15	"Who's That Girl"	Madonna	2
August 29	"La Bamba"	Los Lobos	3
September 19	"I Just Can't Stop Loving You"	Michael Jackson with Siedah Garrett	1
September 26	"Didn't We Almost Have It All"	Whitney Houston	1
October 3	"Here I Go Again"	Whitesnake	1
October 10	"Carrie"	Europe	1
October 17	"Lost in Emotion"	Lisa Lisa & Cult Jam	1
October 24	"Bad"	Michael Jackson	2
November 7	"I Think We're Alone Now"	Tiffany	2
November 21	"(I've Had) The Time of My Life"	Bill Medley and Jennifer Warnes	2
December 5	"Heaven Is a Place on Earth"	Belinda Carlisle	1
December 12	"Faith"	George Michael	5
1988
January 16	"Got My Mind Set On You"	George Harrison	1
January 23	"Need You Tonight"	INXS	1
January 30	"Could've Been"	Tiffany	3
February 20	"Father Figure"	George Michael	4
March 19	"Never Gonna Give You Up"	Rick Astley	1
March 26	"Man in the Mirror"	Michael Jackson	3
April 16	"Get Outta My Dreams, Get Into My Car"	Billy Ocean	2
April 30	"Where Do Broken Hearts Go"	Whitney Houston	1
May 7	"Anything for You"	Gloria Estefan and Miami Sound Machine	2
May 21	"One More Try"	George Michael	4
June 18	"Together Forever"	Rick Astley	1
June 25	"Foolish Beat"	Debbie Gibson	2
July 9	"The Flame"	Cheap Trick	2
July 23	"Hold On to the Nights"	Richard Marx	1
July 30	"Roll with It"	Steve Winwood	4
August 27	"Monkey"	George Michael	2
September 10	"Perfect World"	Huey Lewis & the News	1
September 17	"Sweet Child o' Mine"	Guns N' Roses	2
October 1	"Love Bites"	Def Leppard	2
October 15	"Red Red Wine"	UB40	1
October 22	"Groovy Kind of Love"	Phil Collins	2
November 5	"Kokomo"	The Beach Boys	2
November 19	"Wild, Wild West"	The Escape Club	1
November 26	"Baby, I Love Your Way/Freebird Medley"	Will to Power	1
December 3	"Look Away"	Chicago	3
December 24	"Every Rose Has Its Thorn"	Poison	3
1989
January 14	"Two Hearts"	Phil Collins	3
February 4	"When I'm with You"	Sheriff	1
February 11	"Straight Up"	Paula Abdul	3
March 4	"Lost In Your Eyes"	Debbie Gibson	3
March 25	"The Living Years"	Mike + The Mechanics	1
April 1	"Eternal Flame"	The Bangles	1
April 8	"The Look"	Roxette	2
April 22	"Like a Prayer"	Madonna	3
May 13	"I'll Be There for You"	Bon Jovi	1
May 20	"Forever Your Girl"	Paula Abdul	2
June 3	"Rock On"	Michael Damian	1
June 10	"I'll Be Loving You (Forever)"	New Kids on the Block	2
June 24	"Satisfied"	Richard Marx	2
July 8	"Good Thing"	Fine Young Cannibals	2
July 22	"If You Don't Know Me by Now"	Simply Red	1
July 29	"Toy Soldiers"	Martika	1
August 5	"Right Here Waiting"	Richard Marx	5
September 9	"Cold Hearted"	Paula Abdul	1
September 16	"Don't Wanna Lose You"	Gloria Estefan	1
September 23	"Girl I'm Gonna Miss You"	Milli Vanilli	3
October 14	"Miss You Much"	Janet Jackson	3
November 4	"Listen to Your Heart"	Roxette	1
November 11	"When I See You Smile"	Bad English	2
November 25	"Blame It on the Rain"	Milli Vanilli	2
December 9	"We Didn't Start the Fire"	Billy Joel	1
December 16	"Another Day in Paradise"	Phil Collins	5

== See also ==
- 1980s in music

== Sources ==
- Whitburn, Joel. The Billboard Book of Top 40 Hits. (2004) ISBN 0-8230-7499-4
