= List of number-one hits of 1986 (Flanders) =

These hits topped the Ultratop 50 in the Flanders region of Belgium in 1986.

Date	Artist	Title
January 4	Elton John	"Nikita"
January 11	Elton John	"Nikita"
January 18	Elton John	"Nikita"
January 25	Elton John	"Nikita"
February 1	Elton John	"Nikita"
February 8	Elton John	"Nikita"
February 15	Feargal Sharkey	"A Good Heart"
February 22	Billy Ocean	"When the Going Gets Tough, the Tough Get Going"
March 1	Billy Ocean	"When the Going Gets Tough, the Tough Get Going"
March 8	Survivor	"Burning Heart"
March 15	Survivor	"Burning Heart"
March 22	Billy Ocean	"When the Going Gets Tough, the Tough Get Going"
March 29	Cock Robin	"The Promise You Made"
April 5	Cock Robin	"The Promise You Made"
April 12	Cock Robin	"The Promise You Made"
April 19	Cock Robin	"The Promise You Made"
April 26	Cock Robin	"The Promise You Made"
May 3	Cliff Richard & The Young Ones	"Living Doll"
May 10	Cliff Richard & The Young Ones	"Living Doll"
May 17	Cliff Richard & The Young Ones	"Living Doll"
May 24	Cliff Richard & The Young Ones	"Living Doll"
May 31	Sandra Kim	"J'aime La Vie"
June 7	Sandra Kim	"J'aime La Vie"
June 14	Sandra Kim	"J'aime La Vie"
June 21	Sandra Kim	"J'aime La Vie"
June 28	Sam Cooke	"Wonderful World"
July 5	Sandra Kim	"J'aime La Vie"
July 12	Sandra Kim	"J'aime La Vie"
July 19	Sandra Kim	"J'aime La Vie"
July 26	Wham!	"The Edge of Heaven
August 2	Wham!	"The Edge of Heaven
August 9	Madonna	"Papa Don't Preach"
August 16	Madonna	"Papa Don't Preach"
August 23	MC Miker G & DJ Sven	"Holiday Rap"
August 30	MC Miker G & DJ Sven	"Holiday Rap"
September 6	Matia Bazar	"Ti sento"
September 13	Matia Bazar	"Ti sento"
September 20	Matia Bazar	"Ti sento"
September 27	Chris de Burgh	"The Lady in Red"
October 4	Chris de Burgh	"The Lady in Red"
October 11	Europe	"The Final Countdown"
October 18	Europe	"The Final Countdown"
October 25	Europe	"The Final Countdown"
November 1	Berlin	"Take My Breath Away"
November 8	Berlin	"Take My Breath Away"
November 15	The Communards	"Don't Leave Me This Way"
November 22	The Communards	"Don't Leave Me This Way"
November 29	The Communards	"Don't Leave Me This Way"
December 6	The Communards	"Don't Leave Me This Way"
December 13	The Communards	"Don't Leave Me This Way"
December 20	The Communards	"Don't Leave Me This Way"
December 27	The Bangles	"Walk Like an Egyptian"

== See also ==
- 1986 in music
