= List of Billboard Hot 100 number ones of 1986 =

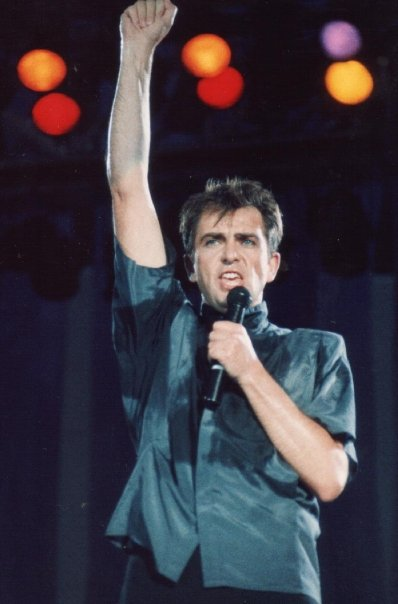
"Sledgehammer" was the first Hot 100 number one for Peter Gabriel. Genesis, the band which he had fronted in the 1970s, also reached the top spot for the first time in 1986.

The Billboard Hot 100 is a chart published since August 1958 by Billboard magazine which ranks the best-performing singles in the United States. In 1986, it was compiled based on a combination of sales and airplay data sourced from surveys of retail outlets and playlists submitted by radio stations, respectively. During the year, 31 different singles spent time at number one.

At the start of the year, "Say You, Say Me" by Lionel Richie held the number-one position, having reached the top spot in the issue of Billboard dated December 21. It was replaced in the issue dated January 18 by "That's What Friends Are For", credited to Dionne & Friends. A charity single intended to raise funds for HIV/AIDS-related causes, the song was performed by Dionne Warwick, Elton John, Gladys Knight and Stevie Wonder. It was the first Hot 100 number one for Knight without her long-time backing group the Pips. The single spent four weeks atop the chart, the year's longest unbroken run at number one. In March, the rock band Heart, which had charted regularly on the Hot 100 since 1976, reached number one for the first time with "These Dreams". In contrast, the song which replaced it at number one, "Rock Me Amadeus", was the first single by the Austrian musician Falco to enter the Hot 100. In June, "On My Own", a duet by Patti LaBelle and Michael McDonald, began a three-week run at number one. The singers had previously spent time atop the Hot 100 as the lead vocalists of Labelle and the Doobie Brothers respectively but the single was the first chart-topper for each as a soloist. Similarly, Peter Cetera achieved his first solo number one with "Glory of Love" having previously topped the chart as the lead singer of Chicago. He returned to number one later in the year with "The Next Time I Fall", a collaboration with Amy Grant, and was one of three acts with multiple chart-toppers in 1986; Whitney Houston and Madonna also took two singles to number one. Houston's total of five weeks in the top spot was the most for any act during the year.

A number of British acts topped the Hot 100 for the first time as the so-called Second British Invasion of the U.S. music scene, which had begun in 1981, continued. Nearly a decade after he first appeared on the chart, Robert Palmer reached the top spot for the first time with "Addicted to Love", its success helped by a striking music video. A week later, Pet Shop Boys topped the listing for the first time with "West End Girls". In July, the rock band Genesis reached number one with "Invisible Touch"; it was the first Hot 100 chart-topper for the group, which had been active since the late 1960s and had first charted in the United States in 1977. After a single week in the top spot, the single was displaced by "Sledgehammer", the first number one for Peter Gabriel, who had been the lead singer of Genesis from its formation until 1975. Further British acts Simply Red, Steve Winwood, and Bananarama all gained their first U.S. number ones in 1986; none of their chart-topping songs achieved equivalent success in their home country. Two acts whose long and successful careers have been recognized with induction into the Rock and Roll Hall of Fame achieved their first Hot 100 number ones in 1986, Janet Jackson with "When I Think of You" in October and Bon Jovi with "You Give Love a Bad Name" the following month. Berlin, Boston, Amy Grant, and Bruce Hornsby & the Range also topped the Hot 100 for the first time in 1986, as did the Bangles, whose single "Walk Like an Egyptian" was the year's final number one.

== Chart history ==
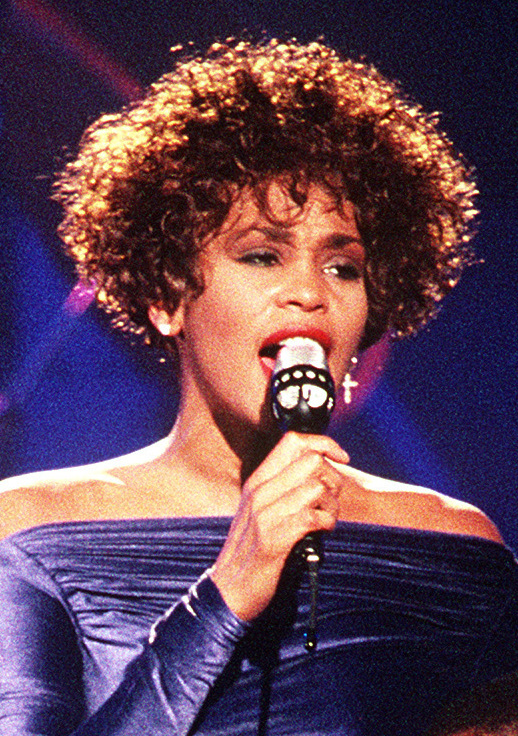
Whitney Houston had two number ones in 1986.

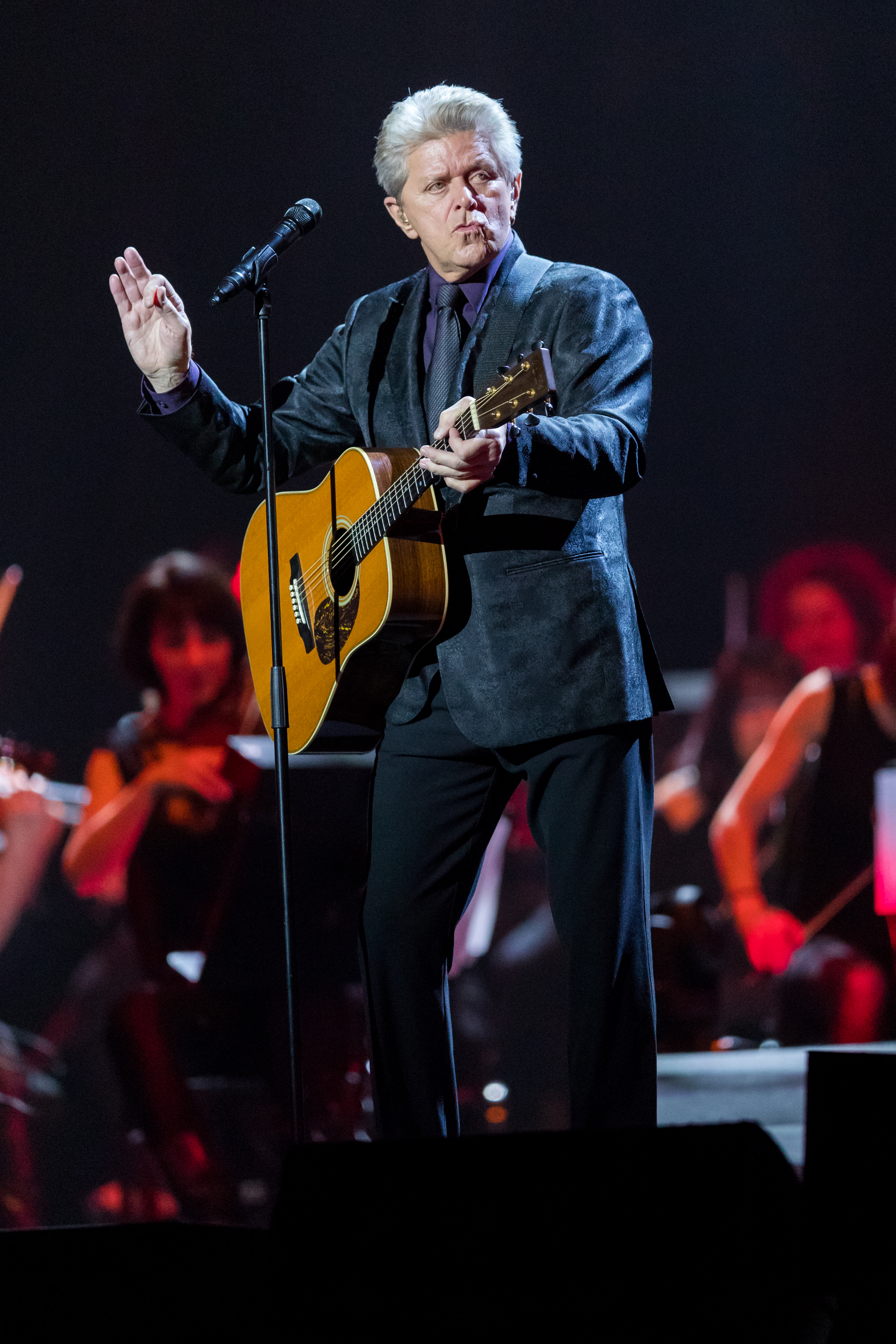
Peter Cetera (pictured in 2017) had two chart-toppers.

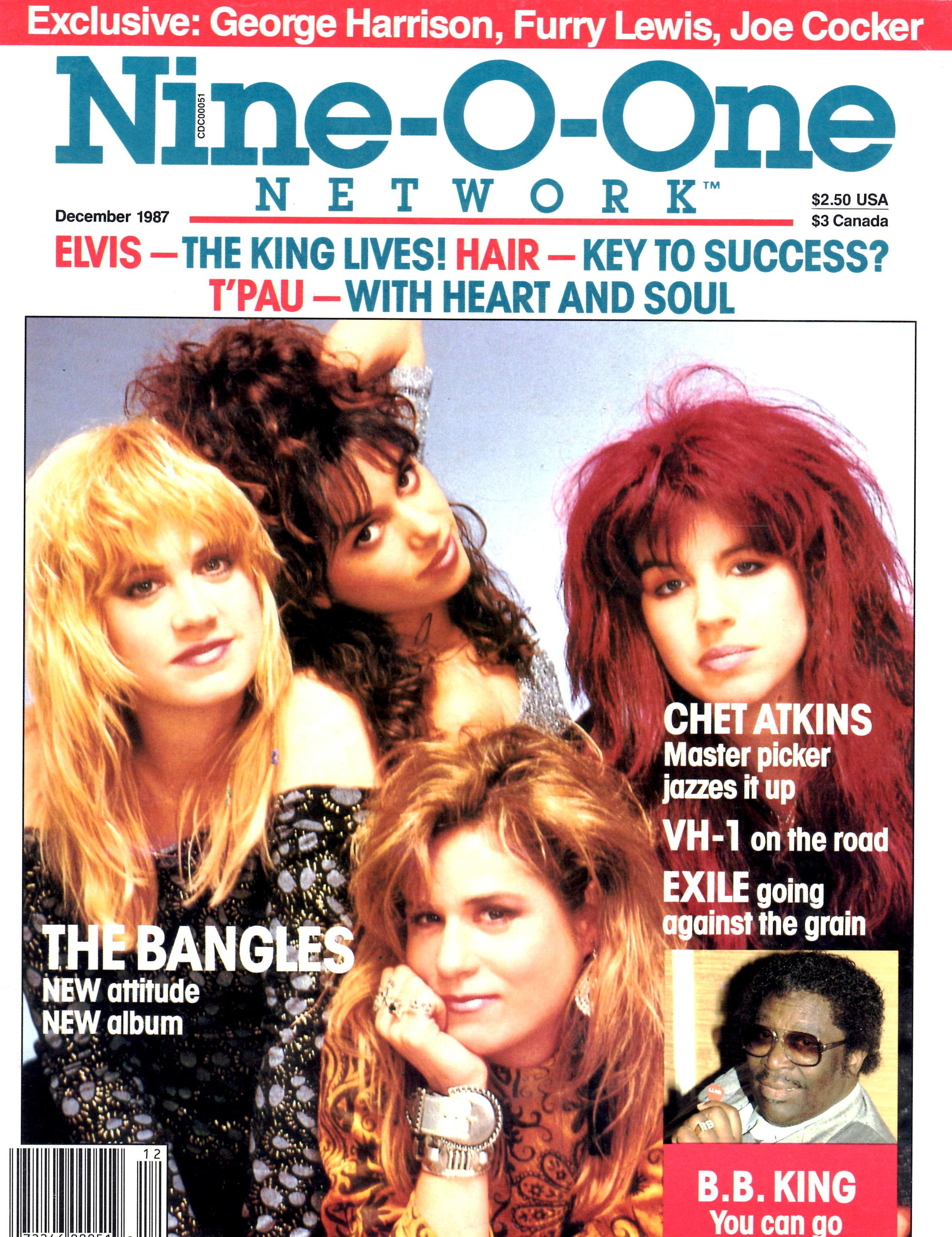
The Bangles gained their first number one.

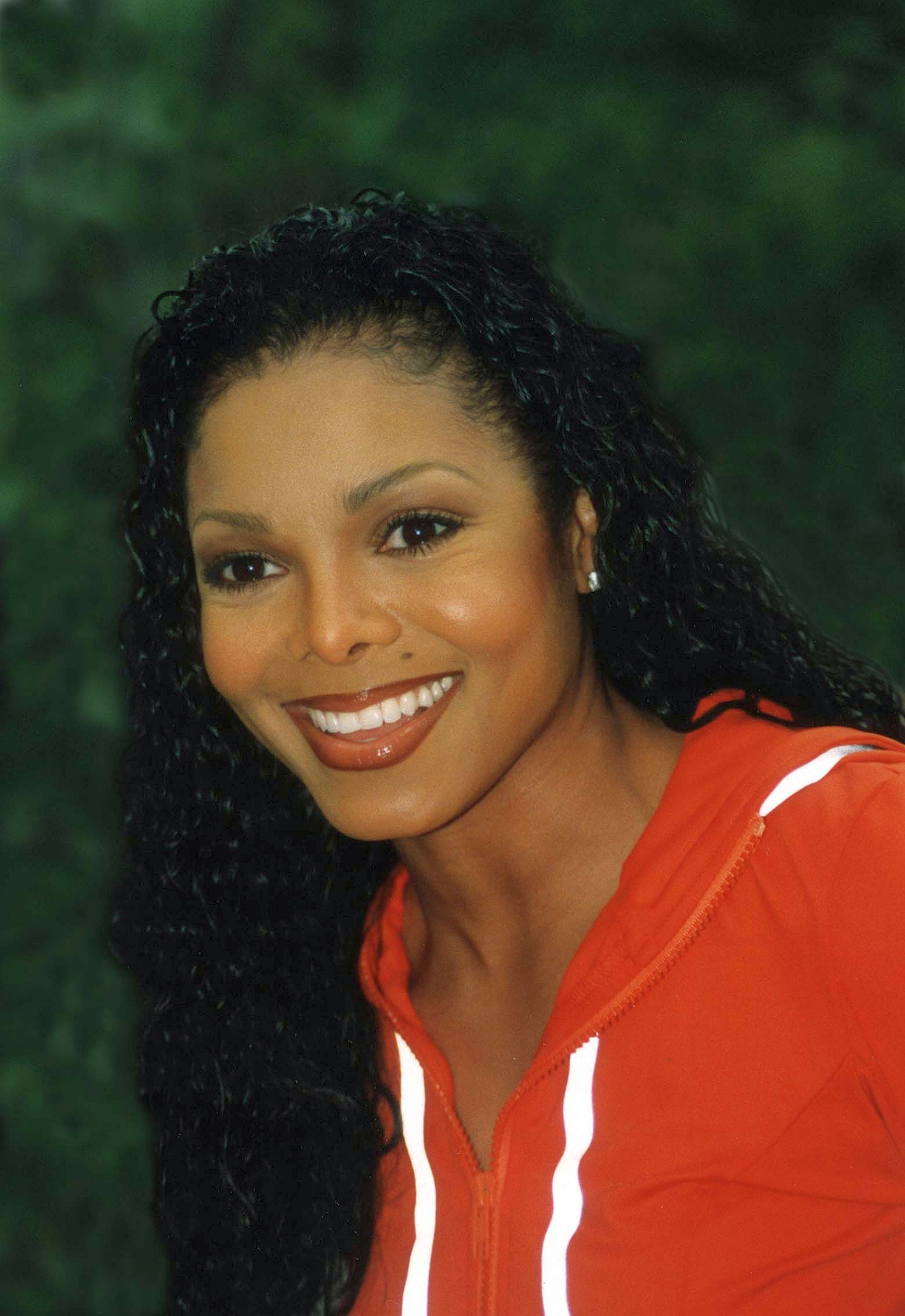
"When I Think of You" was the first number one for Janet Jackson (pictured in 1998).

Chart history
No. (Note: The "No." column indicates the numerical sequence of number ones in Hot 100 history.)	Issue date	Title	Artist(s)	Ref.
587	January 4 (Note: This was an unpublished week, due to a special double issue that Billboard published in print the previous week. All positions on the Hot 100 were "frozen" during the break.)	"Say You, Say Me"	Lionel Richie	
587	January 11	"Say You, Say Me"	Lionel Richie	
588	January 18	"That's What Friends Are For"	Dionne and Friends (Note: Dionne & Friends consisted of Dionne Warwick, Elton John, Gladys Knight and Stevie Wonder.)	
588	January 25	"That's What Friends Are For"	Dionne and Friends	
588	February 1	"That's What Friends Are For"	Dionne and Friends	
588	February 8	"That's What Friends Are For"	Dionne and Friends	
589	February 15	"How Will I Know"	Whitney Houston	
589	February 22	"How Will I Know"	Whitney Houston	
590	March 1	"Kyrie"	Mr. Mister	
590	March 8	"Kyrie"	Mr. Mister	
591	March 15	"Sara"	Starship	
592	March 22	"These Dreams"	Heart	
593	March 29	"Rock Me Amadeus"	Falco	
593	April 5	"Rock Me Amadeus"	Falco	
593	April 12	"Rock Me Amadeus"	Falco	
594	April 19	"Kiss"	Prince and the Revolution	
594	April 26	"Kiss"	Prince and the Revolution	
595	May 3	"Addicted to Love"	Robert Palmer	
596	May 10	"West End Girls"	Pet Shop Boys	
597	May 17	"Greatest Love of All"	Whitney Houston	
597	May 24	"Greatest Love of All"	Whitney Houston	
597	May 31	"Greatest Love of All"	Whitney Houston	
598	June 7	"Live to Tell"	Madonna	
599	June 14	"On My Own"	Patti LaBelle and Michael McDonald	
599	June 21	"On My Own"	Patti LaBelle and Michael McDonald	
599	June 28	"On My Own"	Patti LaBelle and Michael McDonald	
600	July 5	"There'll Be Sad Songs (To Make You Cry)"	Billy Ocean	
601	July 12	"Holding Back the Years"	Simply Red	
602	July 19	"Invisible Touch"	Genesis	
603	July 26	"Sledgehammer"	Peter Gabriel	
604	August 2	"Glory of Love"	Peter Cetera	
604	August 9	"Glory of Love"	Peter Cetera	
605	August 16	"Papa Don't Preach"	Madonna	
605	August 23	"Papa Don't Preach"	Madonna	
606	August 30	"Higher Love"	Steve Winwood	
607	September 6	"Venus"	Bananarama	
608	September 13	"Take My Breath Away"	Berlin	
609	September 20	"Stuck with You"	Huey Lewis and the News	
609	September 27	"Stuck with You"	Huey Lewis and the News	
609	October 4	"Stuck with You"	Huey Lewis and the News	
610	October 11	"When I Think of You"	Janet Jackson	
610	October 18	"When I Think of You"	Janet Jackson	
611	October 25	"True Colors"	Cyndi Lauper	
611	November 1	"True Colors"	Cyndi Lauper	
612	November 8	"Amanda"	Boston	
612	November 15	"Amanda"	Boston	
613	November 22	"Human"	The Human League	
614	November 29	"You Give Love a Bad Name"	Bon Jovi	
615	December 6	"The Next Time I Fall"	Peter Cetera and Amy Grant	
616	December 13	"The Way It Is"	Bruce Hornsby & the Range	
617	December 20	"Walk Like an Egyptian"	The Bangles	
617	December 27	"Walk Like an Egyptian"	The Bangles	

== Number-one artists ==
List of number-one artists by total weeks at number one
Weeks at No. 1	Artist
5	Whitney Houston
4	Dionne Warwick
4	Elton John
4	Stevie Wonder
4	Gladys Knight
3	Falco
3	Madonna
3	Patti Labelle
3	Michael McDonald
3	Huey Lewis and the News
3	Peter Cetera
2	Lionel Richie
2	Mr. Mister
2	Prince and the Revolution
2	Janet Jackson
2	Cyndi Lauper
2	Boston
2	The Bangles
1	Starship
1	Heart
1	Robert Palmer
1	Pet Shop Boys
1	Billy Ocean
1	Simply Red
1	Genesis
1	Peter Gabriel
1	Steve Winwood
1	Bananarama
1	Berlin
1	The Human League
1	Bon Jovi
1	Amy Grant
1	Bruce Hornsby & the Range

== See also ==
- 1986 in music
- List of Billboard number-one singles
- Cash Box Top 100 number-one singles of 1986
- List of Billboard Hot 100 number-one singles of the 1980s
