= Radio Songs (chart) =

US radio airplay music chart published by Billboard magazine

The Radio Songs chart (previously named Top 40 Radio Monitor until July 1993 and Hot 100 Airplay until 2014) is released weekly by Billboard magazine and measures the airplay of songs being played on radio stations throughout the United States across all musical genres. It is one of the three components, along with sales (both physical and the digital) and streaming activity, that determine the chart positions of songs on the Billboard Hot 100.

== History ==
Radio airplay has always been one of the component charts of the Hot 100. Prior to the establishment of the Hot 100, Billboard published a radio airplay chart, a singles sales chart and a jukebox play chart, the last of which was discontinued in 1959 as jukeboxes lost their popularity. During the 1960s and 1970s, Billboard continued to collect airplay data as a component of the Hot 100 but did not make the chart public.

The airplay-only chart debuted as a 30-position chart on October 20, 1984, and was expanded to 40 positions on May 31, 1986. Rankings were based on playlists received by a panel of Top 40 radio stations. On December 8, 1990, Billboard introduced the 75-position Top 40 Radio Monitor chart positions, which ranked songs measured by the number of spins each song on monitored radio stations and the ratings for those stations when the songs were being played based on Nielsen BDS technology. The BDS-measured Top 40 Radio Monitor chart became the official airplay-component of the Hot 100 on November 30, 1991.

== Chart data collection ==
Each week, the Radio Songs chart ranks the top 100 songs by most airplay points (frequently referred to as audience impressions, which is a calculation of the number of times a song is played and the audience size of the station playing the tune). A song can pick up an airplay point every time it is selected to be played on specific radio stations that Billboard monitors. Radio stations across the board are used, from Top 40 Mainstream (which plays a wide variety of music that is generally the most popular songs of the time) to more genre-specific radio stations such as urban radio and country music. Paid plays of a song or treatment as bumper music do not count as an impression.

During the early years of the chart, only airplay data from top 40 radio stations were compiled to generate the chart. Effective from issue dated July 17, 1993, adult contemporary stations were added to the panel, followed by modern rock few months later. However, beginning in December 1998, the chart profile expanded to include airplay data from radio stations of other formats such as R&B, rock and country. To preserve the notion of the former chart, the Top 40 Tracks chart (now defunct) was introduced at the same time.

Per Billboard (as of October 2011):

"1,214 stations, encompassing pop, adult, rock, country, R&B/hip-hop, Christian, gospel, dance, jazz and Latin formats, are electronically monitored 24 hours a day, 7 days a week by Nielsen Broadcast Data System. This data is used to compile the Billboard Hot 100."

The radio airplay data was previously collected on a Wednesday to Tuesday weekly cycle prior to July 2015, and on a Monday to Sunday weekly cycle from July 2015 to July 2021. As of the chart dated July 17, 2021, the radio airplay data is collected on a Friday through Thursday weekly cycle, which matches that of the other Hot 100 metrics (streaming and sales).

== Lists of number ones ==
- 1980s
- 1990s
- 2000s
- 2010s
- 2020s

== Song records ==
=== Highest debut ===
No. 2

- Madonna – "Erotica" (October 17, 1992)

No. 4

- Mariah Carey featuring Trey Lorenz – "I'll Be There" (May 30, 1992)
- Janet Jackson – "That's the Way Love Goes" (May 1, 1993)
- Adele – "Easy on Me" (October 30, 2021)

No. 6

- Lady Gaga – "Born This Way" (February 26, 2011)
- Rihanna – "Lift Me Up" (November 12, 2022)

No. 7

- Taylor Swift - "The Fate of Ophelia" (October 18, 2025)
- Taylor Swift - "I Knew It, I Knew You” (June 20, 2026)

No. 8

- Mariah Carey – "Fantasy" (September 9, 1995)

No. 9

- Janet Jackson – "All for You" (March 17, 2001)

=== Most weeks at number one ===
Weeks	Artist	Song	Year(s)	Source
27	Shaboozey	"A Bar Song (Tipsy)"	2024–2025	
27	Alex Warren	"Ordinary"	2025–2026	
26	The Weeknd	"Blinding Lights"	2020	
21	Bruno Mars	"I Just Might"	2026	
18	Goo Goo Dolls	"Iris"	1998	
18	Miley Cyrus	"Flowers"	2023	
16	No Doubt	"Don't Speak"	1996–1997	
16	Mariah Carey	"We Belong Together"	2005	
16	Maroon 5 featuring Cardi B	"Girls Like You"	2018	
15	Adele	"Easy on Me"	2021–2022	
14	Céline Dion	"Because You Loved Me"	1996	
14	Alicia Keys	"No One"	2007–2008	
14	Panic! at the Disco	"High Hopes"	2018–2019	

=== Highest audience peaks ===
- 228.9 million, "Blurred Lines", Robin Thicke featuring T.I. and Pharrell, August 31, 2013
- 225.9 million, "Happy", Pharrell Williams, April 12, 2014
- 212.1 million, "We Belong Together", Mariah Carey, July 9, 2005
- 196.3 million, "Irreplaceable", Beyoncé, January 20, 2007
- 196.0 million, "All of Me", John Legend, May 10, 2014
- 192.5 million, "No One", Alicia Keys, December 22, 2007
- 189.8 million, "Uptown Funk", Mark Ronson featuring Bruno Mars, March 14, 2015
- 189.6 million, "Let Me Love You", Mario, February 5, 2005
- 185.0 million, "Shape of You", Ed Sheeran, April 29, 2017
- 175.6 million, "Gold Digger", Kanye West featuring Jamie Foxx, October 22, 2005

Listed here are airplay peaks by song. Even if a song has registered enough impressions to be listed during multiple weeks, it is only listed once.

=== Shortest climbs to number one ===
4 weeks

- Mariah Carey – "Dreamlover" (1993)
- Adele – "Hello" (2015)

5 weeks

- TLC – "No Scrubs" (1999)
- Destiny's Child – "Survivor" (2001)
- Miley Cyrus – "Flowers" (2023)

== Artist records ==
=== Most number-one songs after BDS-based chart's December 1990 inception ===
Number of songs	Artist	Source
13	Rihanna	
12	Bruno Mars	
11	Mariah Carey	
9	Taylor Swift	
7	Usher	
7	Katy Perry	
7	Maroon 5	
6	Ludacris	
6	Kanye West	
6	Beyoncé	

=== Most cumulative weeks at number one ===
Weeks	Artist	Source
91	Mariah Carey	
91	Bruno Mars	
72	Rihanna	
50	Usher	
50	Boyz II Men	
50	Maroon 5	
45	Beyoncé	
44	The Weeknd	
44	Taylor Swift	
40	Adele	

=== Most-consecutive number-one songs ===
- 5 (tie) – Katy Perry ("California Gurls", "Teenage Dream", "Firework", "E.T.", "Last Friday Night (T.G.I.F.)")
- 5 (tie) – Rihanna ("Rude Boy", "Love the Way You Lie", "Only Girl (In the World)", "What's My Name?", "S&M")

=== Most charting songs ===
Number of Songs	Artist	Source
101	Drake	
83	Chris Brown	
82	Lil Wayne	
63	Nicki Minaj	
59	Kenny Chesney	
56	Jay-Z	
55	Taylor Swift	
54	Tim McGraw	
52	Rihanna	
48	Usher	
44	Beyoncé	
44	Ludacris	
40	Mariah Carey	
39	Justin Bieber	
32	Ariana Grande	
30	P!nk	

=== Most top 10 songs ===
Number of Songs	Artist	Source
30	Rihanna	
25	Taylor Swift	
24	Drake	
24	Mariah Carey	
23	Justin Bieber	
22	Bruno Mars	
21	Beyoncé	
20	Lil Wayne	
20	Ariana Grande	
19	Chris Brown	
18	Maroon 5	
18	Usher	

=== Self-replacement at number one ===
- Boyz II Men – "On Bended Knee" replaced "I'll Make Love to You" (December 1994)
- Mariah Carey – "One Sweet Day" replaced "Fantasy" (December 1995)
- Nelly – "Dilemma" replaced "Hot in Herre" (August 2002)
- Usher – "Confessions Part II" replaced "Burn", which replaced "Yeah!" (May, July 2004)
- Mariah Carey – "Shake It Off" replaced "We Belong Together" (September 2005)
- T.I. – "Live Your Life" replaced "Whatever You Like" (November 2008)
- Rihanna – "What's My Name?" replaced "Only Girl (In the World)" (January 2011)
- The Weeknd – "The Hills" replaced "Can't Feel My Face" (October 2015)
- Justin Bieber – "Love Yourself" replaced "Sorry" (February 2016)
- Cardi B – "Girls Like You" replaced "I Like It" (August 2018)

== Use in media ==
On November 30, 1991, after 21 years of using the Billboard Hot 100 as their source, American Top 40 started using this chart, which at the time was called the Top 40 Radio Monitor. This relationship ended in January 1993, as American Top 40 switched to the Billboard Mainstream Top 40 chart. The ongoing splintering of Top 40 radio in the early 1990s led stations to lean into specific formats, meaning that practically no station would play the wide array of genres that typically composed each weekly Hot 100 chart.
