= Walk Like an Egyptian =

1986 single by the Bangles

- Australian 1986 12-inch vinyl picture sleeve

Single by the Bangles

from the album Different Light
- B-side: "Angels Don't Fall in Love"; "Not Like You"
- Released: September 1, 1986
- Studio: Sunset Sound Factory (Los Angeles)
- Genre: Pop rock; new wave; novelty
- Length: 3:24
- Label: Columbia; Bangle-a-lang Music
- Songwriter: Liam Sternberg
- Producer: David Kahne

The Bangles singles chronology
"If She Knew What She Wants" (1986)	"Walk Like an Egyptian" (1986)	"Walking Down Your Street" (1986)
"Everything I Wanted" (1990)	"Walk Like an Egyptian (remix)" (1990)	"The Eternal Mix" (1990)

Music video
- "Walk Like an Egyptian" on YouTube

"Walk Like an Egyptian" is a song by the American pop rock band the Bangles. It was released in September 1986 as the third single from the band's second album, Different Light (1986). It was the band's first number-one single in the United States, being certified gold by the Recording Industry Association of America (RIAA), and Billboard ranked it the top song of 1987 in the US. It was also successful internationally, reaching number one in seven other countries and peaking at number three on the UK Singles Chart.

== Inspiration ==
Liam Sternberg said he was inspired to create the song while on a ferry crossing the English Channel. When the vessel hit choppy water, passengers stepped carefully and moved their arms awkwardly while struggling to maintain their balance, and that reminded Sternberg of the depiction of human figures in ancient Egyptian tomb paintings. He wrote the words "Walk like an Egyptian" in a notebook. Later, Sternberg looked back in the notebook and, composing the melody with a guitar, he put together an up-tempo song with lyrics about Egyptian hieroglyphs, the Nile River, crocodiles, desert sand, bazaars and hookah pipes and then segued into modern scenes of blonde waitresses, school children and police officers.

Sternberg referring to "the sand dance" in the song's lyrics has made some see Sternberg inspired by earlier pop culture dances associated with Ancient Egypt, such as the 1930s sand dance of Wilson, Keppel and Betty and even earlier performances.

== Recording ==
Sternberg finished a demo version by January 1984 with the singer Marti Jones, featuring percussion with kitchen implements. He offered it to Toni Basil, who turned it down. Lene Lovich recorded the first version of the song, but it was unreleased when she decided to take a break from music to raise her family. David Kahne, who like Sternberg was affiliated with Peer International Publishing, was the producer of Different Light. He received a copy of the demo and liked it, especially Jones's "offhand quality", and took the song to the Bangles, who agreed to record it.

Kahne constructed a multitrack consisting of a tape loop of him playing a "dog head shaker", overlaid himself playing a drum beat on a LinnDrum drum machine by hand, and then had each member of the group sing the lyrics to determine who would sing each verse; Vicki Peterson, Michael Steele and Susanna Hoffs sang lead vocals in the final version on the first, second and third verses, respectively. Kahne disliked Debbi Peterson's leads, so she was relegated to backing vocals, which angered her and caused tension within the group. The situation was exacerbated by the use of the LinnDrum in place of her drumming, further diminishing her role in the song. She plays the tambourine during their 1986 performance on BBC's The Old Grey Whistle Test. Kahne performed the whistling hook in the song that precedes Hoffs' final verse. In live performances, the whistling part is either played by a keyboard and mimed by Debbi, or substituted by the band's scatting vocals.

== Critical reception ==
Di Cross of Record Mirror considered "Walk Like an Egyptian" an example of the Bangles "adopting an eastern flavour amidst the statutory guitars, jangly noises, and quaint vocals, sucking in the candyfloss pop of some predictably inoffensive lyrics", which the reviewer deemed a style regression in the band's career.

== Chart performance ==
"Walk Like an Egyptian" was the third single released from Different Light. It debuted on the Billboard Hot 100 in September 1986. The song reached a peak of number three on the UK Singles Chart in November 1986 and reached number one in the US on December 20, staying at the top of the Hot 100 for four weeks, carrying it over into January 1987. The success of the song and "Manic Monday" propelled Different Light to number two on the Billboard 200 chart, making it the group's most successful album.

== Music video ==
The music video for "Walk Like an Egyptian" was nominated for Best Group Video at the 1987 MTV Video Music Awards. It shows the Bangles performing the song at a concert and scenes of people dancing in poses similar to those depicted in the Ancient Egyptian reliefs that inspired Sternberg. Most of these people were filmed on the streets of New York City, although special effects were used to modify photos of Diana, Princess of Wales and the then Prince Charles, the Libyan leader Muammar Gaddafi, and the Statue of Liberty.

In a popular scene from the video, Susanna Hoffs was filmed in a close-up where her eyes moved from side to side. When asked about the scene in an interview, she explained that she was looking at individual audience members during the video shoot, which took place with a live audience. Looking directly at individual audience members was a technique she used to overcome stage fright and she was unaware that the camera had a close-up on her while she was using this technique, switching between one audience member on her left and one on her right.

== 1990 re-release ==
In 1990, "Walk Like an Egyptian" was reissued as a single in the UK to promote the Bangles' Greatest Hits album. It included new remixes for the song called Ozymandias Remix. It charted at number 73 in the UK.

== Airplay restrictions ==
"Walk Like an Egyptian" was one of the songs which were claimed to have been banned by Clear Channel following the September 11 attacks. In researching this, Snopes found that the list was simply suggestions regarding songs to be sensitive about when deciding what to play. It was also included in a "list of records to be avoided" drawn up by the BBC during the Gulf War.

== Accolades ==
Year	Publisher	Country	Accolade	Rank
1986	Hot Press	Ireland	"Singles of the Year" (20)	4
1986	The Village Voice	United States	"Singles of the Year" (25)	16
2003	Giannis Petridis	Greece	"2004 of the Best Songs of the Century"	*
2003	Paul Morley	United Kingdom	"Greatest Pop Single of All Time"	*
2003	Pause & Play	United States	"Vault of Fame" (Songs)	*
2005	Bruce Pollock	United States	"The 7,500 Most Important Songs of 1944–2000"	*
2006	VH1	United States	"100 Greatest Songs of the 80's"	14
2009	Gilles Verlant and Thomas Caussé	France	"3000 Rock Classics"	*
2009	Radio Veronica	Netherlands	"Best of the 80s" (100)	99

(*) indicates the list is unordered.

== Track listings ==
7-inch single

1. "Walk Like an Egyptian" (3:21)
2. "Not Like You" (3:05)

12-inch single

1. "Walk Like an Egyptian" (extended dance mix) (5:48)
2. "Walk Like an Egyptian" (dub mix) (5:17)
3. "Walk Like an Egyptian" (a cappella mix) (2:47)
4. "Angels Don't Fall in Love" (3:21)

== Personnel ==
Personnel are sourced from Sound on Sound.

- Susanna Hoffs – lead and backing vocals, electric rhythm guitar
- Vicki Peterson – lead and backing vocals, electric lead guitar
- Michael Steele – lead and backing vocals, bass guitar
- Debbi Peterson – backing vocals, drums
- David Kahne – E-mu Emulator II, LinnDrum programming, electric rhythm guitar, "dog head" shaker, whistling

== Charts ==
=== Weekly charts ===
1986–1987 weekly chart performance for "Walk Like an Egyptian"
Chart (1986–1987)	Peak position
Australia (Kent Music Report)	1
Austria (Ö3 Austria Top 40)	6
Belgium (Ultratop 50 Flanders)	1
Canada Retail Singles (The Record)	1
Canada Top Singles (RPM)	1
Europe (European Hot 100 Singles)	7
Finland (Suomen virallinen lista)	11
France (SNEP)	15
Ireland (IRMA)	2
Italy Airplay (Music & Media)	9
Japan (Oricon)	83
Luxembourg (Radio Luxembourg)	3
Netherlands (Dutch Top 40)	1
Netherlands (Single Top 100)	1
New Zealand (Recorded Music NZ)	2
Quebec (ADISQ)	2
South Africa (Springbok Radio)	1
Spain (AFYVE)	1
Switzerland (Schweizer Hitparade)	8
UK Singles (Official Charts)	3
US Billboard Hot 100	1
US 12-inch Singles Sales (Billboard)	15
US Dance/Disco Club Play (Billboard)	46
US Cash Box Top 100	1
West Germany (GfK)	1

1990 weekly chart performance for "Walk Like an Egyptian"
Chart (1990)	Peak position
UK Singles (Official Charts)	73

=== Year-end charts ===
1986 year-end chart performance for "Walk Like an Egyptian"
Chart (1986)	Position
Belgium (Ultratop 50 Flanders)	48
Netherlands (Dutch Top 40)	63
Netherlands (Single Top 100)	27
UK Singles (OCC)	23

1987 year-end chart performance for "Walk Like an Egyptian"
Chart (1987)	Position
Australia (Australian Music Report)	7
Belgium (Ultratop 50 Flanders)	51
Canada Top Singles (RPM)	25
European Top 100 Singles (Music & Media)	27
Netherlands (Dutch Top 40)	64
Netherlands (Single Top 100)	95
New Zealand (RIANZ)	39
South Africa (Springbok Radio)	8
US Billboard Hot 100	1
West Germany (Media Control)	28

=== All-time charts ===
All-time chart performance for "Walk Like an Egyptian"
Chart (1958–2018)	Position
US Billboard Hot 100	165

== Certifications and sales ==
Certifications and sales for "Walk Like an Egyptian"
Region	Certification	Certified units/sales
Canada (Music Canada)	Gold	50,000^{^}
Netherlands (NVPI)	Platinum	100,000^{^}
United Kingdom (BPI)	Platinum	600,000^{‡}
United States (RIAA)	Gold	500,000^{^}
^{^} Shipments figures based on certification alone.^{‡} Sales+streaming figures based on certification alone.

== In popular culture ==
The song was used during the closing credits of Asterix & Obelix: Mission Cleopatra (2002) by Alain Chabat, one of the biggest successes in French cinema box-office history.

The song was used in Totally Spies! The Movie (2009).

In 2009, in the Family Guy episode title "420" (S07 E12), Carter Pewterschmidt is shown listening to the song while singing different lyrics that relate to his life.

In 2012, the song was used in season 3 of Eastbound & Down.

In 2014, the song was used as the ending credits theme for the first 24 episodes of the Japanese animated series JoJo's Bizarre Adventure: Stardust Crusaders, which was based on the third part of the manga series JoJo's Bizarre Adventure, which is set on a travel from Japan to Egypt.

The song was performed in the Spanish animated movie Mummies (2023).

== See also ==
- Sand dance
- List of Billboard Hot 100 number-one singles of 1986
- List of Billboard Year-End number-one singles and albums
- List of Hot 100 Airplay number-one singles of the 1980s
- List of number-one singles in Australia during the 1980s
- List of Cash Box Top 100 number-one singles of 1986
- List of Dutch Top 40 number-one singles of 1986
- List of number-one hits of 1986 (Flanders)
- List of number-one hits of 1986 (Germany)
- List of number-one singles of 1987 (Canada)
- List of number-one singles of 1987 (Spain)
