= List of Dutch Top 40 number-one singles of 1986 =

These hits topped the Dutch Top 40 in 1986.

Issue Date	Song	Artist(s)	Reference
4 January	"Nikita"	Elton John	
11 January	"Nikita"	Elton John	
18 January	"Nikita"	Elton John	
25 January	"Nikita"	Elton John	
1 February	"A Good Heart"	Feargal Sharkey	
8 February	"A Good Heart"	Feargal Sharkey	
15 February	"When the Going Gets Tough, the Tough Get Going"	Billy Ocean	
22 February	"When the Going Gets Tough, the Tough Get Going"	Billy Ocean	
1 March	"When the Going Gets Tough, the Tough Get Going"	Billy Ocean	
8 March	"When the Going Gets Tough, the Tough Get Going"	Billy Ocean	
15 March	"When the Going Gets Tough, the Tough Get Going"	Billy Ocean	
22 March	"The Promise You Made"	Cock Robin	
29 March	"The Promise You Made"	Cock Robin	
5 April	"Jeanny"	Falco	
12 April	"Jeanny"	Falco	
19 April	"Living Doll"	Cliff Richard & The Young Ones	
26 April	"Living Doll"	Cliff Richard & The Young Ones	
3 May	"Living Doll"	Cliff Richard & The Young Ones	
10 May	"Living Doll"	Cliff Richard & The Young Ones	
17 May	"A Different Corner"	George Michael	
24 May	"Wonderful World"	Sam Cooke	
31 May	"Wonderful World"	Sam Cooke	
7 June	"Wonderful World"	Sam Cooke	
14 June	"Wonderful World"	Sam Cooke	
21 June	"What Have You Done for Me Lately"	Janet Jackson	
28 June	"What Have You Done for Me Lately"	Janet Jackson	
5 July	"What Have You Done for Me Lately"	Janet Jackson	
12 July	"The Edge of Heaven"	Wham!	
19 July	"The Edge of Heaven"	Wham!	
26 July	"The Edge of Heaven"	Wham!	
2 August	"Holiday Rap"	MC Miker G & DJ Sven	
9 August	"Holiday Rap"	MC Miker G & DJ Sven	
16 August	"Holiday Rap"	MC Miker G & DJ Sven	
23 August	"Sing Our Own Song"	UB40	
30 August	"Sing Our Own Song"	UB40	
6 September	"Sing Our Own Song"	UB40	
13 September	"Sing Our Own Song"	UB40	
20 September	"The Way It Is"	Bruce Hornsby and the Range	
27 September	"The Final Countdown"	Europe	
4 October	"The Final Countdown"	Europe	
11 October	"The Final Countdown"	Europe	
18 October	"The Final Countdown"	Europe	
25 October	"Take My Breath Away"	Berlin	
1 November	"Don't Leave Me This Way"	The Communards	
8 November	"Don't Leave Me This Way"	The Communards	
15 November	"Don't Leave Me This Way"	The Communards	
22 November	"Don't Leave Me This Way"	The Communards	
29 November	"Don't Leave Me This Way"	The Communards	
6 December	"Walk Like an Egyptian"	The Bangles	
13 December	"Walk Like an Egyptian"	The Bangles	
20 December	"Walk Like an Egyptian"	The Bangles	
27 December	No Top 40 released		

== See also ==
- 1986 in music
