= List of Radio Songs number ones of the 2010s =

This article list the songs which received the most airplay per week on radio stations in the United States as ranked and published by Billboard magazine on the Radio Songs chart (previously named Hot 100 Airplay) during the 2010s.

== Number-one airplay hits ==
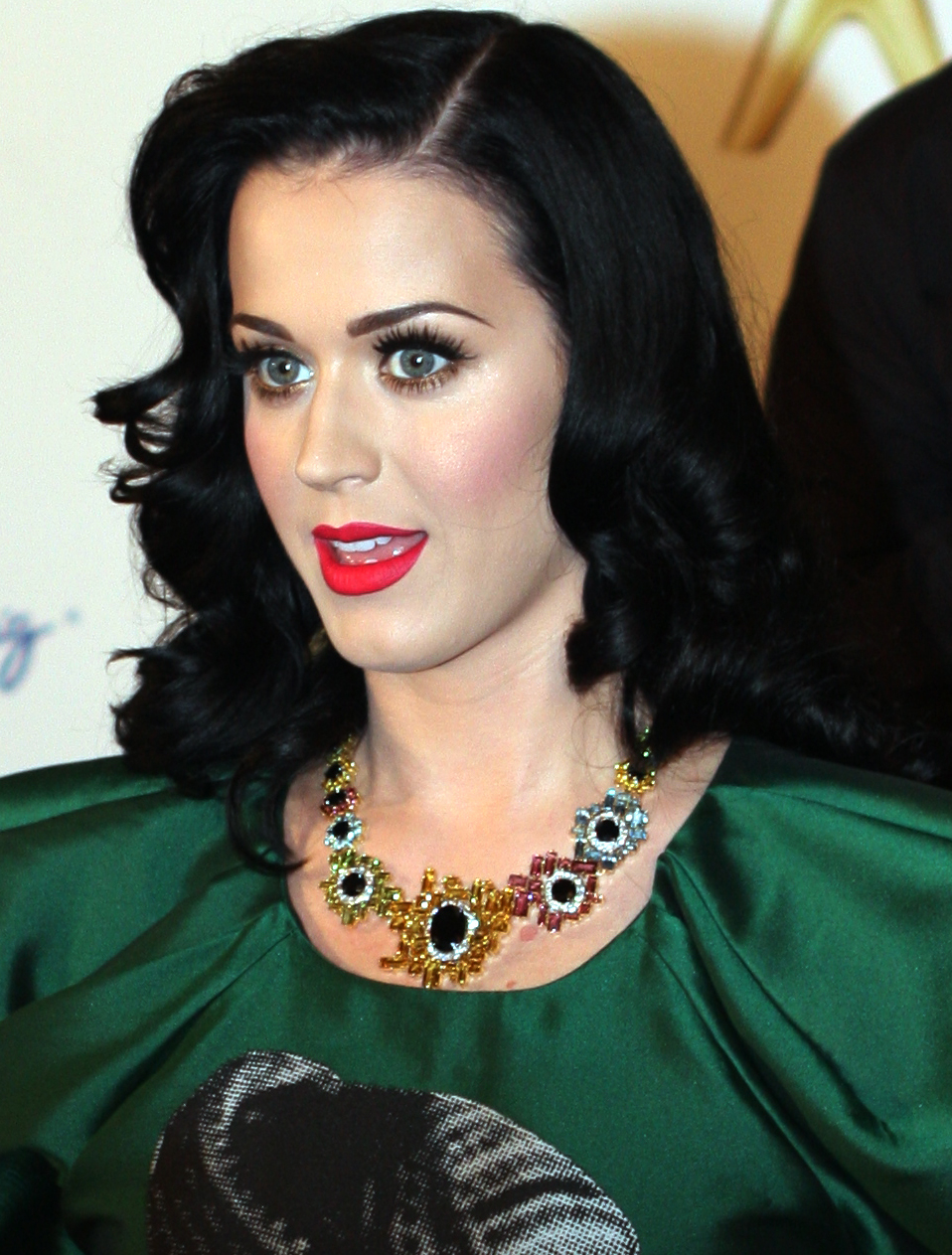
Katy Perry has the third-most number-one singles of the 2010s, with seven. She is also tied with Rihanna for the most-consecutive singles at number one on the chart with five.

Key
†	Indicates best-performing radio song of the year

Issue date	Song	Artist(s)	Ref.
2010
January 2	"Empire State of Mind"	Jay-Z and Alicia Keys	
January 9	"Empire State of Mind"	Jay-Z and Alicia Keys	
January 16	"Empire State of Mind"	Jay-Z and Alicia Keys	
January 23	"Empire State of Mind"	Jay-Z and Alicia Keys	
January 30	"Tik Tok"	Kesha	
February 6	"Tik Tok"	Kesha	
February 13	"Tik Tok"	Kesha	
February 20	"Tik Tok"	Kesha	
February 27	"Tik Tok"	Kesha	
March 6	"Tik Tok"	Kesha	
March 13	"Tik Tok"	Kesha	
March 20	"BedRock"	Young Money featuring Lloyd	
March 27	"Need You Now" †	Lady Antebellum	
April 3	"Need You Now" †	Lady Antebellum	
April 10	"Rude Boy"	Rihanna	
April 17	"Rude Boy"	Rihanna	
April 24	"Rude Boy"	Rihanna	
May 1	"Rude Boy"	Rihanna	
May 8	"Rude Boy"	Rihanna	
May 15	"Rude Boy"	Rihanna	
May 22	"Nothin' on You"	B.o.B featuring Bruno Mars	
May 29	"Nothin' on You"	B.o.B featuring Bruno Mars	
June 5	"Nothin' on You"	B.o.B featuring Bruno Mars	
June 12	"OMG"	Usher featuring will.i.am	
June 19	"OMG"	Usher featuring will.i.am	
June 26	"OMG"	Usher featuring will.i.am	
July 3	"OMG"	Usher featuring will.i.am	
July 10	"OMG"	Usher featuring will.i.am	
July 17	"OMG"	Usher featuring will.i.am	
July 24	"OMG"	Usher featuring will.i.am	
July 31	"California Gurls"	Katy Perry featuring Snoop Dogg	
August 7	"California Gurls"	Katy Perry featuring Snoop Dogg	
August 14	"California Gurls"	Katy Perry featuring Snoop Dogg	
August 21	"Love the Way You Lie"	Eminem featuring Rihanna	
August 28	"Love the Way You Lie"	Eminem featuring Rihanna	
September 4	"Love the Way You Lie"	Eminem featuring Rihanna	
September 11	"Love the Way You Lie"	Eminem featuring Rihanna	
September 18	"Love the Way You Lie"	Eminem featuring Rihanna	
September 25	"Love the Way You Lie"	Eminem featuring Rihanna	
October 2	"Love the Way You Lie"	Eminem featuring Rihanna	
October 9	"Love the Way You Lie"	Eminem featuring Rihanna	
October 16	"Teenage Dream"	Katy Perry	
October 23	"Just the Way You Are"	Bruno Mars	
October 30	"Just the Way You Are"	Bruno Mars	
November 6	"Just the Way You Are"	Bruno Mars	
November 13	"Just the Way You Are"	Bruno Mars	
November 20	"Just the Way You Are"	Bruno Mars	
November 27	"Just the Way You Are"	Bruno Mars	
December 4	"Just the Way You Are"	Bruno Mars	
December 11	"Only Girl (In the World)"	Rihanna	
December 18	"Only Girl (In the World)"	Rihanna	
December 25	"Only Girl (In the World)"	Rihanna	
2011
January 1	"What's My Name?"	Rihanna featuring Drake	
January 8	"What's My Name?"	Rihanna featuring Drake	
January 15	"What's My Name?"	Rihanna featuring Drake	
January 22	"What's My Name?"	Rihanna featuring Drake	
January 29	"What's My Name?"	Rihanna featuring Drake	
February 5	"What's My Name?"	Rihanna featuring Drake	
February 12	"What's My Name?"	Rihanna featuring Drake	
February 19	"Firework"	Katy Perry	
February 26	"Grenade"	Bruno Mars	
March 5	"Grenade"	Bruno Mars	
March 12	"Grenade"	Bruno Mars	
March 19	"Tonight (I'm Lovin' You)"	Enrique Iglesias featuring Ludacris and DJ Frank E	
March 26	"Tonight (I'm Lovin' You)"	Enrique Iglesias featuring Ludacris and DJ Frank E	
April 2	"Born This Way"	Lady Gaga	
April 9	"Fuck You"	CeeLo Green	
April 16	"S&M"	Rihanna	
April 23	"S&M"	Rihanna	
April 30	"S&M"	Rihanna	
May 7	"E.T."	Katy Perry featuring Kanye West	
May 14	"E.T."	Katy Perry featuring Kanye West	
May 21	"E.T."	Katy Perry featuring Kanye West	
May 28	"E.T."	Katy Perry featuring Kanye West	
June 4	"E.T."	Katy Perry featuring Kanye West	
June 11	"Rolling in the Deep"	Adele	
June 18	"Rolling in the Deep"	Adele	
June 25	"Rolling in the Deep"	Adele	
July 2	"Rolling in the Deep"	Adele	
July 9	"Rolling in the Deep"	Adele	
July 16	"Rolling in the Deep"	Adele	
July 23	"Give Me Everything" †	Pitbull featuring Ne-Yo, Afrojack and Nayer	
July 30	"Give Me Everything" †	Pitbull featuring Ne-Yo, Afrojack and Nayer	
August 6	"Give Me Everything" †	Pitbull featuring Ne-Yo, Afrojack and Nayer	
August 13	"Party Rock Anthem"	LMFAO featuring Lauren Bennett and GoonRock	
August 20	"Last Friday Night (T.G.I.F.)"	Katy Perry	
August 27	"Last Friday Night (T.G.I.F.)"	Katy Perry	
September 3	"Party Rock Anthem"	LMFAO featuring Lauren Bennett and GoonRock	
September 10	"Last Friday Night (T.G.I.F.)"	Katy Perry	
September 17	"Last Friday Night (T.G.I.F.)"	Katy Perry	
September 24	"Last Friday Night (T.G.I.F.)"	Katy Perry	
October 1	"Moves Like Jagger"	Maroon 5 featuring Christina Aguilera	
October 8	"Moves Like Jagger"	Maroon 5 featuring Christina Aguilera	
October 15	"Moves Like Jagger"	Maroon 5 featuring Christina Aguilera	
October 22	"Moves Like Jagger"	Maroon 5 featuring Christina Aguilera	
October 29	"Moves Like Jagger"	Maroon 5 featuring Christina Aguilera	
November 5	"Moves Like Jagger"	Maroon 5 featuring Christina Aguilera	
November 12	"Someone Like You"	Adele	
November 19	"Someone Like You"	Adele	
November 26	"Moves Like Jagger"	Maroon 5 featuring Christina Aguilera	
December 3	"We Found Love"	Rihanna featuring Calvin Harris	
December 10	"We Found Love"	Rihanna featuring Calvin Harris	
December 17	"We Found Love"	Rihanna featuring Calvin Harris	
December 24	"We Found Love"	Rihanna featuring Calvin Harris	
December 31	"We Found Love"	Rihanna featuring Calvin Harris	
2012
January 7	"We Found Love"	Rihanna featuring Calvin Harris	
January 14	"We Found Love"	Rihanna featuring Calvin Harris	
January 21	"We Found Love"	Rihanna featuring Calvin Harris	
January 28	"We Found Love"	Rihanna featuring Calvin Harris	
February 4	"We Found Love"	Rihanna featuring Calvin Harris	
February 11	"We Found Love"	Rihanna featuring Calvin Harris	
February 18	"We Found Love"	Rihanna featuring Calvin Harris	
February 25	"Set Fire to the Rain"	Adele	
March 3	"Set Fire to the Rain"	Adele	
March 10	"Set Fire to the Rain"	Adele	
March 17	"Set Fire to the Rain"	Adele	
March 24	"Set Fire to the Rain"	Adele	
March 31	"Set Fire to the Rain"	Adele	
April 7	"Stronger (What Doesn't Kill You)"	Kelly Clarkson	
April 14	"Stronger (What Doesn't Kill You)"	Kelly Clarkson	
April 21	"We Are Young"	Fun featuring Janelle Monáe	
April 28	"We Are Young"	Fun featuring Janelle Monáe	
May 5	"We Are Young"	Fun featuring Janelle Monáe	
May 12	"We Are Young"	Fun featuring Janelle Monáe	
May 19	"We Are Young"	Fun featuring Janelle Monáe	
May 26	"We Are Young"	Fun featuring Janelle Monáe	
June 2	"Somebody That I Used to Know" †	Gotye featuring Kimbra	
June 9	"Somebody That I Used to Know" †	Gotye featuring Kimbra	
June 16	"Somebody That I Used to Know" †	Gotye featuring Kimbra	
June 23	"Somebody That I Used to Know" †	Gotye featuring Kimbra	
June 30	"Somebody That I Used to Know" †	Gotye featuring Kimbra	
July 7	"Somebody That I Used to Know" †	Gotye featuring Kimbra	
July 14	"Payphone"	Maroon 5 featuring Wiz Khalifa	
July 21	"Payphone"	Maroon 5 featuring Wiz Khalifa	
July 28	"Payphone"	Maroon 5 featuring Wiz Khalifa	
August 4	"Payphone"	Maroon 5 featuring Wiz Khalifa	
August 11	"Payphone"	Maroon 5 featuring Wiz Khalifa	
August 18	"Payphone"	Maroon 5 featuring Wiz Khalifa	
August 25	"Lights"	Ellie Goulding	
September 1	"Lights"	Ellie Goulding	
September 8	"Lights"	Ellie Goulding	
September 15	"Lights"	Ellie Goulding	
September 22	"Lights"	Ellie Goulding	
September 29	"Blow Me (One Last Kiss)"	Pink	
October 6	"Blow Me (One Last Kiss)"	Pink	
October 13	"Blow Me (One Last Kiss)"	Pink	
October 20	"One More Night"	Maroon 5	
October 27	"One More Night"	Maroon 5	
November 3	"One More Night"	Maroon 5	
November 10	"One More Night"	Maroon 5	
November 17	"One More Night"	Maroon 5	
November 24	"One More Night"	Maroon 5	
December 1	"One More Night"	Maroon 5	
December 8	"One More Night"	Maroon 5	
December 15	"Diamonds"	Rihanna	
December 22	"Diamonds"	Rihanna	
December 29	"Diamonds"	Rihanna	
2013
January 5	"Locked Out of Heaven"	Bruno Mars	
January 12	"Locked Out of Heaven"	Bruno Mars	
January 19	"Locked Out of Heaven"	Bruno Mars	
January 26	"Locked Out of Heaven"	Bruno Mars	
February 2	"Locked Out of Heaven"	Bruno Mars	
February 9	"Locked Out of Heaven"	Bruno Mars	
February 16	"Locked Out of Heaven"	Bruno Mars	
February 23	"I Knew You Were Trouble"	Taylor Swift	
March 2	"I Knew You Were Trouble"	Taylor Swift	
March 9	"I Knew You Were Trouble"	Taylor Swift	
March 16	"I Knew You Were Trouble"	Taylor Swift	
March 23	"Thrift Shop"	Macklemore and Ryan Lewis featuring Wanz	
March 30	"Thrift Shop"	Macklemore and Ryan Lewis featuring Wanz	
April 6	"When I Was Your Man"	Bruno Mars	
April 13	"When I Was Your Man"	Bruno Mars	
April 20	"When I Was Your Man"	Bruno Mars	
April 27	"When I Was Your Man"	Bruno Mars	
May 4	"When I Was Your Man"	Bruno Mars	
May 11	"Stay"	Rihanna featuring Mikky Ekko	
May 18	"Stay"	Rihanna featuring Mikky Ekko	
May 25	"Just Give Me a Reason"	Pink featuring Nate Ruess	
June 1	"Mirrors"	Justin Timberlake	
June 8	"Mirrors"	Justin Timberlake	
June 15	"Mirrors"	Justin Timberlake	
June 22	"Mirrors"	Justin Timberlake	
June 29	"Mirrors"	Justin Timberlake	
July 6	"Mirrors"	Justin Timberlake	
July 13	"Mirrors"	Justin Timberlake	
July 20	"Blurred Lines" †	Robin Thicke featuring T.I. and Pharrell	
July 27	"Blurred Lines" †	Robin Thicke featuring T.I. and Pharrell	
August 3	"Blurred Lines" †	Robin Thicke featuring T.I. and Pharrell	
August 10	"Blurred Lines" †	Robin Thicke featuring T.I. and Pharrell	
August 17	"Blurred Lines" †	Robin Thicke featuring T.I. and Pharrell	
August 24	"Blurred Lines" †	Robin Thicke featuring T.I. and Pharrell	
August 31	"Blurred Lines" †	Robin Thicke featuring T.I. and Pharrell	
September 7	"Blurred Lines" †	Robin Thicke featuring T.I. and Pharrell	
September 14	"Blurred Lines" †	Robin Thicke featuring T.I. and Pharrell	
September 21	"Blurred Lines" †	Robin Thicke featuring T.I. and Pharrell	
September 28	"Blurred Lines" †	Robin Thicke featuring T.I. and Pharrell	
October 5	"Roar"	Katy Perry	
October 12	"Roar"	Katy Perry	
October 19	"Roar"	Katy Perry	
October 26	"Roar"	Katy Perry	
November 2	"Royals"	Lorde	
November 9	"Royals"	Lorde	
November 16	"Royals"	Lorde	
November 23	"Royals"	Lorde	
November 30	"Royals"	Lorde	
December 7	"Royals"	Lorde	
December 14	"Wake Me Up"	Avicii	
December 21	"The Monster"	Eminem featuring Rihanna	
December 28	"The Monster"	Eminem featuring Rihanna	
2014
January 4	"The Monster"	Eminem featuring Rihanna	
January 11	"The Monster"	Eminem featuring Rihanna	
January 18	"The Monster"	Eminem featuring Rihanna	
January 25	"The Monster"	Eminem featuring Rihanna	
February 1	"Counting Stars"	OneRepublic	
February 8	"Counting Stars"	OneRepublic	
February 15	"Counting Stars"	OneRepublic	
February 22	"Counting Stars"	OneRepublic	
March 1	"Dark Horse"	Katy Perry featuring Juicy J	
March 8	"Dark Horse"	Katy Perry featuring Juicy J	
March 15	"Happy"	Pharrell Williams	
March 22	"Happy"	Pharrell Williams	
March 29	"Happy"	Pharrell Williams	
April 5	"Happy"	Pharrell Williams	
April 12	"Happy"	Pharrell Williams	
April 19	"Happy"	Pharrell Williams	
April 26	"Happy"	Pharrell Williams	
May 3	"Happy"	Pharrell Williams	
May 10	"All of Me" †	John Legend	
May 17	"All of Me" †	John Legend	
May 24	"All of Me" †	John Legend	
May 31	"All of Me" †	John Legend	
June 7	"All of Me" †	John Legend	
June 14	"All of Me" †	John Legend	
June 21	"All of Me" †	John Legend	
June 28	"Fancy"	Iggy Azalea featuring Charli XCX	
July 5	"Fancy"	Iggy Azalea featuring Charli XCX	
July 12	"Fancy"	Iggy Azalea featuring Charli XCX	
July 19	"Am I Wrong"	Nico & Vinz	
July 26	"Am I Wrong"	Nico & Vinz	
August 2	"Am I Wrong"	Nico & Vinz	
August 9	"Am I Wrong"	Nico & Vinz	
August 16	"Rude"	Magic!	
August 23	"Stay with Me"	Sam Smith	
August 30	"Stay with Me"	Sam Smith	
September 6	"Stay with Me"	Sam Smith	
September 13	"Stay with Me"	Sam Smith	
September 20	"Stay with Me"	Sam Smith	
September 27	"Stay with Me"	Sam Smith	
October 4	"All About That Bass"	Meghan Trainor	
October 11	"All About That Bass"	Meghan Trainor	
October 18	"All About That Bass"	Meghan Trainor	
October 25	"Shake It Off"	Taylor Swift	
November 1	"Shake It Off"	Taylor Swift	
November 8	"Shake It Off"	Taylor Swift	
November 15	"Shake It Off"	Taylor Swift	
November 22	"Habits (Stay High)"	Tove Lo	
November 29	"Animals"	Maroon 5	
December 6	"Animals"	Maroon 5	
December 13	"Animals"	Maroon 5	
December 20	"Animals"	Maroon 5	
December 27	"Blank Space"	Taylor Swift	
2015
January 3	"Blank Space"	Taylor Swift	
January 10	"Blank Space"	Taylor Swift	
January 17	"Blank Space"	Taylor Swift	
January 24	"Blank Space"	Taylor Swift	
January 31	"Blank Space"	Taylor Swift	
February 7	"Uptown Funk" †	Mark Ronson featuring Bruno Mars	
February 14	"Uptown Funk" †	Mark Ronson featuring Bruno Mars	
February 21	"Uptown Funk" †	Mark Ronson featuring Bruno Mars	
February 28	"Uptown Funk" †	Mark Ronson featuring Bruno Mars	
March 7	"Uptown Funk" †	Mark Ronson featuring Bruno Mars	
March 14	"Uptown Funk" †	Mark Ronson featuring Bruno Mars	
March 21	"Uptown Funk" †	Mark Ronson featuring Bruno Mars	
March 28	"Uptown Funk" †	Mark Ronson featuring Bruno Mars	
April 4	"Uptown Funk" †	Mark Ronson featuring Bruno Mars	
April 11	"Uptown Funk" †	Mark Ronson featuring Bruno Mars	
April 18	"Uptown Funk" †	Mark Ronson featuring Bruno Mars	
April 25	"Uptown Funk" †	Mark Ronson featuring Bruno Mars	
May 2	"Love Me like You Do"	Ellie Goulding	
May 9	"Earned It"	The Weeknd	
May 16	"Earned It"	The Weeknd	
May 23	"Earned It"	The Weeknd	
May 30	"Earned It"	The Weeknd	
June 6	"See You Again"	Wiz Khalifa featuring Charlie Puth	
June 13	"See You Again"	Wiz Khalifa featuring Charlie Puth	
June 20	"See You Again"	Wiz Khalifa featuring Charlie Puth	
June 27	"See You Again"	Wiz Khalifa featuring Charlie Puth	
July 4	"See You Again"	Wiz Khalifa featuring Charlie Puth	
July 11	"See You Again"	Wiz Khalifa featuring Charlie Puth	
July 18	"Bad Blood"	Taylor Swift featuring Kendrick Lamar	
July 25	"Bad Blood"	Taylor Swift featuring Kendrick Lamar	
August 1	"Bad Blood"	Taylor Swift featuring Kendrick Lamar	
August 8	"Bad Blood"	Taylor Swift featuring Kendrick Lamar	
August 15	"Bad Blood"	Taylor Swift featuring Kendrick Lamar	
August 22	"Can't Feel My Face"	The Weeknd	
August 29	"Can't Feel My Face"	The Weeknd	
September 5	"Can't Feel My Face"	The Weeknd	
September 12	"Can't Feel My Face"	The Weeknd	
September 19	"Can't Feel My Face"	The Weeknd	
September 26	"Can't Feel My Face"	The Weeknd	
October 3	"Can't Feel My Face"	The Weeknd	
October 10	"The Hills"	The Weeknd	
October 17	"The Hills"	The Weeknd	
October 24	"The Hills"	The Weeknd	
October 31	"The Hills"	The Weeknd	
November 7	"The Hills"	The Weeknd	
November 14	"Wildest Dreams"	Taylor Swift	
November 21	"Wildest Dreams"	Taylor Swift	
November 28	"Hello"	Adele	
December 5	"Hello"	Adele	
December 12	"Hello"	Adele	
December 19	"Hello"	Adele	
December 26	"Hello"	Adele	
2016
January 2	"Hello"	Adele	
January 9	"Hello"	Adele	
January 16	"Hello"	Adele	
January 23	"Hello"	Adele	
January 30	"Hello"	Adele	
February 6	"Hello"	Adele	
February 13	"Sorry"	Justin Bieber	
February 20	"Sorry"	Justin Bieber	
February 27	"Love Yourself" †	Justin Bieber	
March 5	"Love Yourself" †	Justin Bieber	
March 12	"Love Yourself" †	Justin Bieber	
March 19	"Love Yourself" †	Justin Bieber	
March 26	"Love Yourself" †	Justin Bieber	
April 2	"Love Yourself" †	Justin Bieber	
April 9	"Love Yourself" †	Justin Bieber	
April 16	"Love Yourself" †	Justin Bieber	
April 23	"Love Yourself" †	Justin Bieber	
April 30	"Love Yourself" †	Justin Bieber	
May 7	"Love Yourself" †	Justin Bieber	
May 14	"7 Years"	Lukas Graham	
May 21	"7 Years"	Lukas Graham	
May 28	"7 Years"	Lukas Graham	
June 4	"7 Years"	Lukas Graham	
June 11	"One Dance"	Drake featuring Wizkid and Kyla	
June 18	"Can't Stop the Feeling!"	Justin Timberlake	
June 25	"Can't Stop the Feeling!"	Justin Timberlake	
July 2	"Can't Stop the Feeling!"	Justin Timberlake	
July 9	"One Dance"	Drake featuring Wizkid and Kyla	
July 16	"Can't Stop the Feeling!"	Justin Timberlake	
July 23	"Can't Stop the Feeling!"	Justin Timberlake	
July 30	"One Dance"	Drake featuring Wizkid and Kyla	
August 6	"One Dance"	Drake featuring Wizkid and Kyla	
August 13	"One Dance"	Drake featuring Wizkid and Kyla	
August 20	"Cheap Thrills"	Sia featuring Sean Paul	
August 27	"Cheap Thrills"	Sia featuring Sean Paul	
September 3	"Cheap Thrills"	Sia featuring Sean Paul	
September 10	"Cheap Thrills"	Sia featuring Sean Paul	
September 17	"Cheap Thrills"	Sia featuring Sean Paul	
September 24	"Cheap Thrills"	Sia featuring Sean Paul	
October 1	"Cheap Thrills"	Sia featuring Sean Paul	
October 8	"Cheap Thrills"	Sia featuring Sean Paul	
October 15	"Closer"	The Chainsmokers featuring Halsey	
October 22	"Closer"	The Chainsmokers featuring Halsey	
October 29	"Closer"	The Chainsmokers featuring Halsey	
November 5	"Closer"	The Chainsmokers featuring Halsey	
November 12	"Closer"	The Chainsmokers featuring Halsey	
November 19	"Closer"	The Chainsmokers featuring Halsey	
November 26	"Closer"	The Chainsmokers featuring Halsey	
December 3	"Closer"	The Chainsmokers featuring Halsey	
December 10	"Closer"	The Chainsmokers featuring Halsey	
December 17	"Closer"	The Chainsmokers featuring Halsey	
December 24	"Closer"	The Chainsmokers featuring Halsey	
December 31	"Don't Wanna Know"	Maroon 5 featuring Kendrick Lamar	
2017
January 7	"Don't Wanna Know"	Maroon 5 featuring Kendrick Lamar	
January 14	"Don't Wanna Know"	Maroon 5 featuring Kendrick Lamar	
January 21	"Don't Wanna Know"	Maroon 5 featuring Kendrick Lamar	
January 28	"Don't Wanna Know"	Maroon 5 featuring Kendrick Lamar	
February 4	"Don't Wanna Know"	Maroon 5 featuring Kendrick Lamar	
February 11	"Don't Wanna Know"	Maroon 5 featuring Kendrick Lamar	
February 18	"Don't Wanna Know"	Maroon 5 featuring Kendrick Lamar	
February 25	"Shape of You" †	Ed Sheeran	
March 4	"Shape of You" †	Ed Sheeran	
March 11	"Shape of You" †	Ed Sheeran	
March 18	"Shape of You" †	Ed Sheeran	
March 25	"Shape of You" †	Ed Sheeran	
April 1	"Shape of You" †	Ed Sheeran	
April 8	"Shape of You" †	Ed Sheeran	
April 15	"Shape of You" †	Ed Sheeran	
April 22	"Shape of You" †	Ed Sheeran	
April 29	"Shape of You" †	Ed Sheeran	
May 6	"Shape of You" †	Ed Sheeran	
May 13	"Shape of You" †	Ed Sheeran	
May 20	"That's What I Like"	Bruno Mars	
May 27	"That's What I Like"	Bruno Mars	
June 3	"That's What I Like"	Bruno Mars	
June 10	"That's What I Like"	Bruno Mars	
June 17	"That's What I Like"	Bruno Mars	
June 24	"That's What I Like"	Bruno Mars	
July 1	"That's What I Like"	Bruno Mars	
July 8	"That's What I Like"	Bruno Mars	
July 15	"That's What I Like"	Bruno Mars	
July 22	"Despacito"	Luis Fonsi and Daddy Yankee featuring Justin Bieber	
July 29	"Despacito"	Luis Fonsi and Daddy Yankee featuring Justin Bieber	
August 5	"Despacito"	Luis Fonsi and Daddy Yankee featuring Justin Bieber	
August 12	"Despacito"	Luis Fonsi and Daddy Yankee featuring Justin Bieber	
August 19	"Despacito"	Luis Fonsi and Daddy Yankee featuring Justin Bieber	
August 26	"Wild Thoughts"	DJ Khaled featuring Rihanna and Bryson Tiller	
September 2	"Wild Thoughts"	DJ Khaled featuring Rihanna and Bryson Tiller	
September 9	"Wild Thoughts"	DJ Khaled featuring Rihanna and Bryson Tiller	
September 16	"Wild Thoughts"	DJ Khaled featuring Rihanna and Bryson Tiller	
September 23	"Attention"	Charlie Puth	
September 30	"Attention"	Charlie Puth	
October 7	"Attention"	Charlie Puth	
October 14	"Attention"	Charlie Puth	
October 21	"Attention"	Charlie Puth	
October 28	"Feel It Still"	Portugal. The Man	
November 4	"Feel It Still"	Portugal. The Man	
November 11	"Feel It Still"	Portugal. The Man	
November 18	"Feel It Still"	Portugal. The Man	
November 25	"Feel It Still"	Portugal. The Man	
December 2	"Thunder"	Imagine Dragons	
December 9	"Thunder"	Imagine Dragons	
December 16	"Thunder"	Imagine Dragons	
December 23	"Havana"	Camila Cabello featuring Young Thug	
December 30	"Havana"	Camila Cabello featuring Young Thug	
2018
January 3	"Havana"	Camila Cabello featuring Young Thug	
January 6	"Havana"	Camila Cabello featuring Young Thug	
January 13	"Perfect" †	Ed Sheeran	
January 20	"Perfect" †	Ed Sheeran	
January 27	"Perfect" †	Ed Sheeran	
February 3	"Perfect" †	Ed Sheeran	
February 10	"Perfect" †	Ed Sheeran	
February 17	"Perfect" †	Ed Sheeran	
February 24	"Perfect" †	Ed Sheeran	
March 3	"Perfect" †	Ed Sheeran	
March 10	"Perfect" †	Ed Sheeran	
March 17	"Finesse"	Bruno Mars and Cardi B	
March 24	"Finesse"	Bruno Mars and Cardi B	
March 31	"Finesse"	Bruno Mars and Cardi B	
April 7	"Finesse"	Bruno Mars and Cardi B	
April 14	"Meant to Be"	Bebe Rexha and Florida Georgia Line	
April 21	"Meant to Be"	Bebe Rexha and Florida Georgia Line	
April 28	"Meant to Be"	Bebe Rexha and Florida Georgia Line	
May 5	"Meant to Be"	Bebe Rexha and Florida Georgia Line	
May 12	"Meant to Be"	Bebe Rexha and Florida Georgia Line	
May 19	"The Middle"	Zedd, Maren Morris, and Grey	
May 26	"The Middle"	Zedd, Maren Morris, and Grey	
June 2	"The Middle"	Zedd, Maren Morris, and Grey	
June 9	"The Middle"	Zedd, Maren Morris, and Grey	
June 16	"The Middle"	Zedd, Maren Morris, and Grey	
June 23	"The Middle"	Zedd, Maren Morris, and Grey	
June 30	"The Middle"	Zedd, Maren Morris, and Grey	
July 7	"The Middle"	Zedd, Maren Morris, and Grey	
July 14	"The Middle"	Zedd, Maren Morris, and Grey	
July 21	"I Like It"	Cardi B, Bad Bunny and J Balvin	
July 28	"I Like It"	Cardi B, Bad Bunny and J Balvin	
August 4	"Girls Like You"	Maroon 5 featuring Cardi B	
August 11	"Girls Like You"	Maroon 5 featuring Cardi B	
August 18	"Girls Like You"	Maroon 5 featuring Cardi B	
August 25	"Girls Like You"	Maroon 5 featuring Cardi B	
September 1	"Girls Like You"	Maroon 5 featuring Cardi B	
September 8	"Girls Like You"	Maroon 5 featuring Cardi B	
September 15	"Girls Like You"	Maroon 5 featuring Cardi B	
September 22	"Girls Like You"	Maroon 5 featuring Cardi B	
September 29	"Girls Like You"	Maroon 5 featuring Cardi B	
October 6	"Girls Like You"	Maroon 5 featuring Cardi B	
October 13	"Girls Like You"	Maroon 5 featuring Cardi B	
October 20	"Girls Like You"	Maroon 5 featuring Cardi B	
October 27	"Girls Like You"	Maroon 5 featuring Cardi B	
November 3	"Girls Like You"	Maroon 5 featuring Cardi B	
November 10	"Girls Like You"	Maroon 5 featuring Cardi B	
November 17	"Girls Like You"	Maroon 5 featuring Cardi B	
November 24	"Happier"	Marshmello and Bastille	
December 1	"High Hopes" †	Panic! at the Disco	
December 8	"High Hopes" †	Panic! at the Disco	
December 15	"High Hopes" †	Panic! at the Disco	
December 22	"High Hopes" †	Panic! at the Disco	
December 29	"High Hopes" †	Panic! at the Disco	
2019
January 5	"High Hopes" †	Panic! at the Disco	
January 12	"High Hopes" †	Panic! at the Disco	
January 19	"High Hopes" †	Panic! at the Disco	
January 26	"High Hopes" †	Panic! at the Disco	
February 2	"High Hopes" †	Panic! at the Disco	
February 9	"High Hopes" †	Panic! at the Disco	
February 16	"High Hopes" †	Panic! at the Disco	
February 23	"High Hopes" †	Panic! at the Disco	
March 2	"High Hopes" †	Panic! at the Disco	
March 9	"Without Me"	Halsey	
March 16	"Without Me"	Halsey	
March 23	"Without Me"	Halsey	
March 30	"Without Me"	Halsey	
April 6	"Without Me"	Halsey	
April 13	"7 Rings"	Ariana Grande	
April 20	"7 Rings"	Ariana Grande	
April 27	"Sucker"	Jonas Brothers	
May 4	"Sucker"	Jonas Brothers	
May 11	"Sucker"	Jonas Brothers	
May 18	"Dancing with a Stranger"	Sam Smith and Normani	
May 25	"Dancing with a Stranger"	Sam Smith and Normani	
June 1	"Sucker"	Jonas Brothers	
June 8	"Sucker"	Jonas Brothers	
June 15	"Sucker"	Jonas Brothers	
June 22	"Talk"	Khalid	
June 29	"Talk"	Khalid	
July 6	"Talk"	Khalid	
July 13	"Talk"	Khalid	
July 20	"Talk"	Khalid	
July 27	"Talk"	Khalid	
August 3	"Talk"	Khalid	
August 10	"Talk"	Khalid	
August 17	"Talk"	Khalid	
August 24	"Talk"	Khalid	
August 31	"Talk"	Khalid	
September 7	"I Don't Care"	Ed Sheeran and Justin Bieber	
September 14	"Señorita"	Shawn Mendes and Camila Cabello	
September 21	"Señorita"	Shawn Mendes and Camila Cabello	
September 28	"Truth Hurts"	Lizzo	
October 5	"Truth Hurts"	Lizzo	
October 12	"Truth Hurts"	Lizzo	
October 19	"Truth Hurts"	Lizzo	
October 26	"Truth Hurts"	Lizzo	
November 2	"Truth Hurts"	Lizzo	
November 9	"Someone You Loved"	Lewis Capaldi	
November 16	"Someone You Loved"	Lewis Capaldi	
November 23	"Someone You Loved"	Lewis Capaldi	
November 30	"Good as Hell"	Lizzo	
December 7	"Good as Hell"	Lizzo	
December 14	"Good as Hell"	Lizzo	
December 21	"Good as Hell"	Lizzo	
December 28	"Circles"	Post Malone	

== Statistics ==
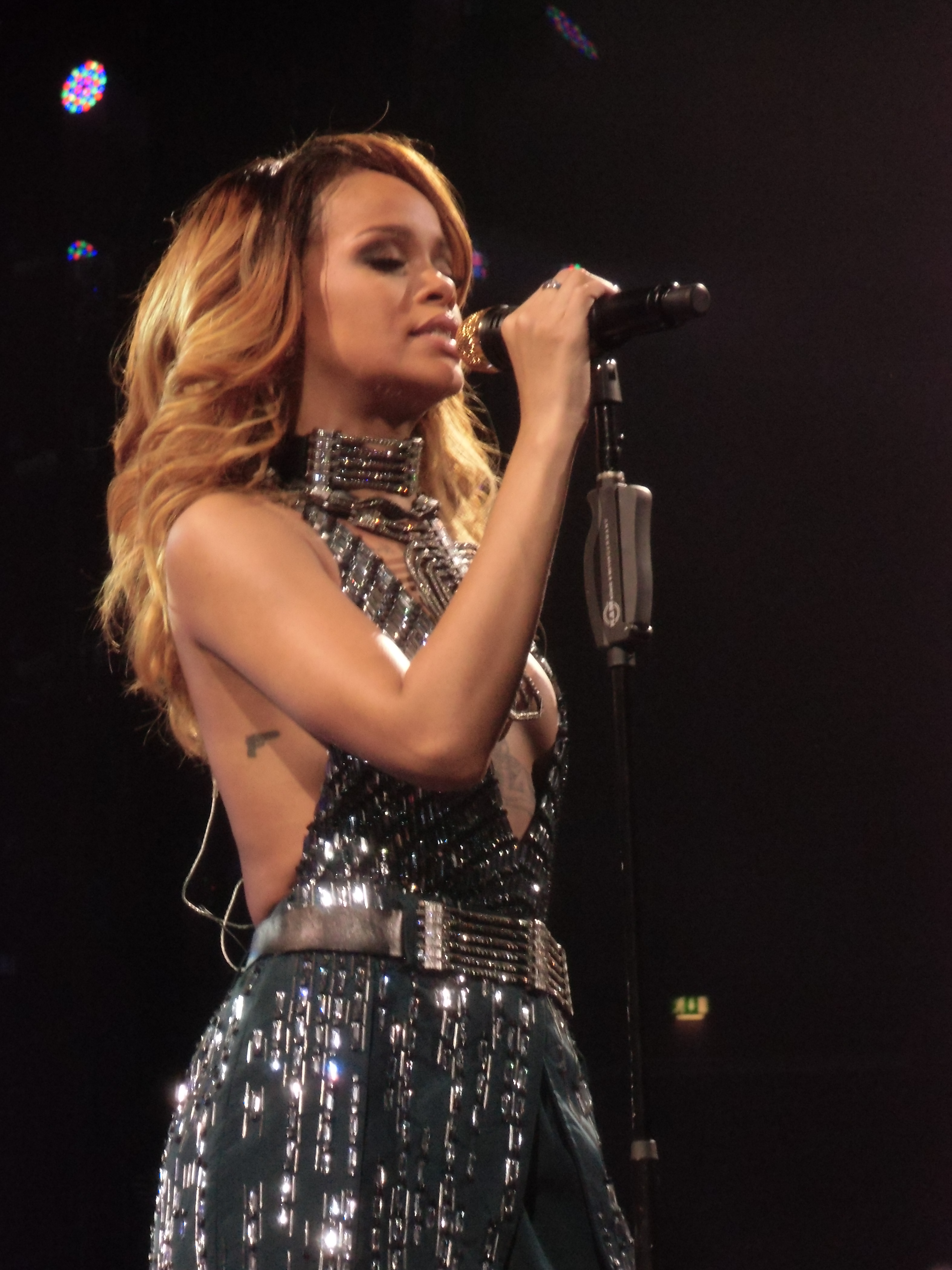
Barbadian artist Rihanna holds the record for the most songs atop the Radio Songs chart with ten, the longest cumulative run at number one with 54 weeks, and is tied with "Uptown Funk" and "See You Again" for the third-longest-running number-one single for "We Found Love" featuring Calvin Harris with twelve weeks, during the 2010s.

=== Artists by total number-one songs ===
The following artists achieved three or more number-one songs during the 2010s. A number of artists had number-one singles on their own as well as part of a collaboration.

Artist	Number-one singles
Rihanna	10
Bruno Mars	8
Katy Perry	7
Maroon 5	6
Taylor Swift	5
Adele	4
Justin Bieber	4
The Weeknd	3
Cardi B	3
Ed Sheeran	3

=== Artists by total cumulative weeks at number one ===
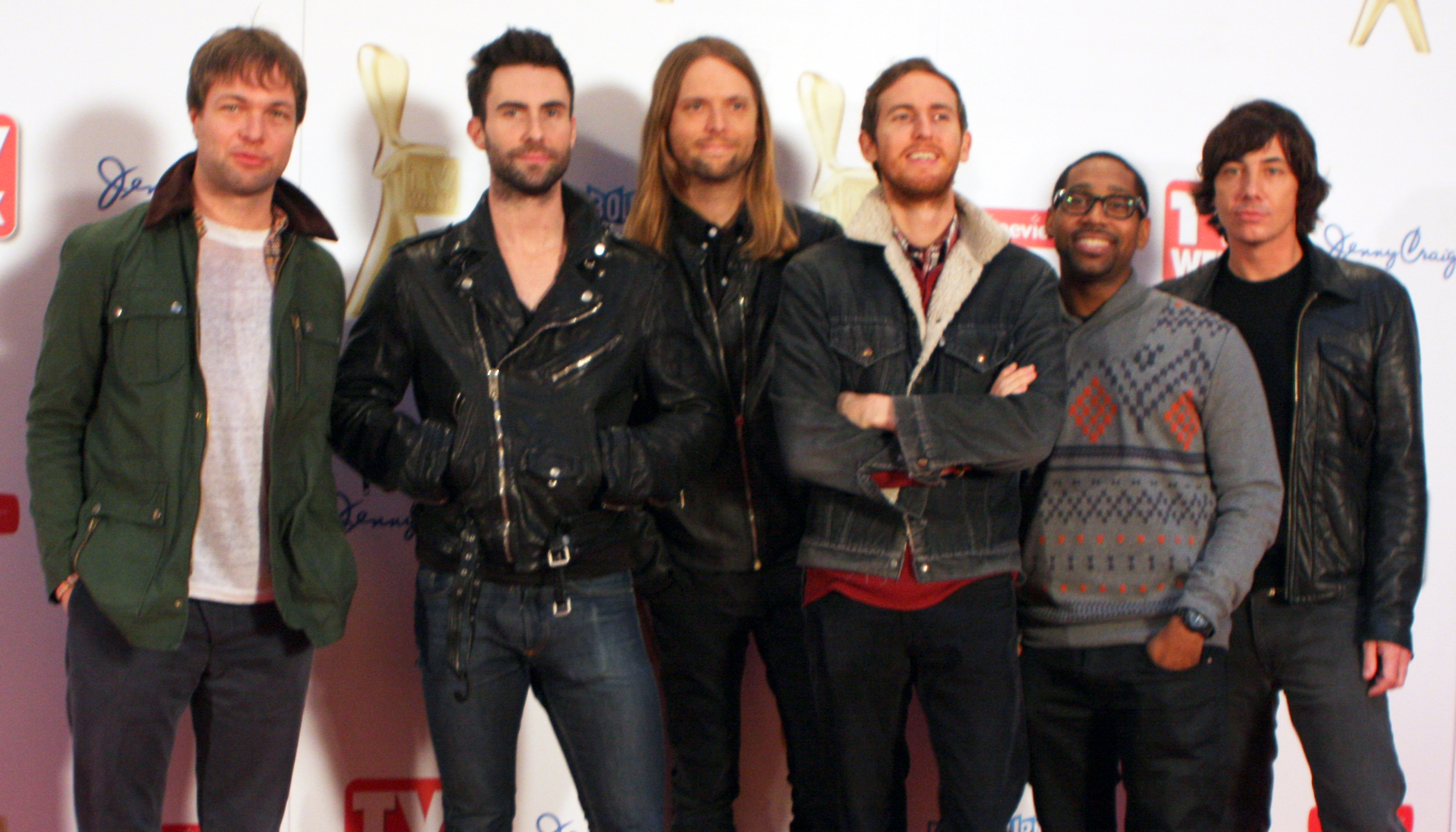
Maroon 5 has the third-longest run at the top of the Radio Songs chart in the 2010s, with 49 weeks. Their song "Girls Like You" with Cardi B was the longest-running number-one song on the chart in the 2010s, with 16 weeks.

The following artists were featured at the top of the Hot 100 for the highest cumulative number of weeks during the 2010s. Some totals include in part or in whole weeks spent at number one as part of a collaboration.

Artist	Weeks at number one
Rihanna	54
Bruno Mars	50
Maroon 5	49
Adele	25
Cardi B	24
Ed Sheeran	24
Katy Perry	21
Taylor Swift	21
Pharrell Williams	19
Justin Bieber	19
The Weeknd	16
Halsey	16
Eminem	14
Panic! at the Disco	14
Calvin Harris	12
Justin Timberlake	12
Mark Ronson	12
Wiz Khalifa	12
Drake	12
Robin Thicke	11
T.I.	11
The Chainsmokers	11
Charlie Puth	11
Khalid	11
Post Malone	11

=== Songs by total number of weeks at number one ===
The following songs were featured at the top of Radio Songs for the highest number of weeks during the 2010s.

Song	Artist(s)	Weeks at number one
"Girls Like You"	Maroon 5 featuring Cardi B	16
"High Hopes"	Panic! at the Disco	14
"We Found Love"	Rihanna featuring Calvin Harris	12
"Uptown Funk"	Mark Ronson featuring Bruno Mars	12
"Shape of You"	Ed Sheeran	12
"Blurred Lines"	Robin Thicke featuring T.I. and Pharrell	11
"Hello"	Adele	11
"Love Yourself"	Justin Bieber	11
"Closer"	The Chainsmokers featuring Halsey	11
"Talk"	Khalid	11
"Circles"^{A}	Post Malone	11
"That's What I Like"	Bruno Mars	9
"Perfect"	Ed Sheeran	9
"The Middle"	Zedd, Maren Morris and Grey	9
"Love the Way You Lie"	Eminem featuring Rihanna	8
"One More Night"	Maroon 5	8
"Happy"	Pharrell Williams	8
"Cheap Thrills"	Sia featuring Sean Paul	8
"Don't Wanna Know"	Maroon 5 featuring Kendrick Lamar	8
"Tik Tok"	Kesha	7
"OMG"	Usher featuring will.i.am	7
"Just the Way You Are"	Bruno Mars	7
"What's My Name?"	Rihanna featuring Drake	7
"Moves Like Jagger"	Maroon 5 featuring Christina Aguilera	7
"Locked Out of Heaven"	Bruno Mars	7
"Mirrors"	Justin Timberlake	7
"All of Me"	John Legend	7
"Can't Feel My Face"	The Weeknd	7

^{A} "Circles" spent six consecutive weeks at number one starting in December 2019, then returned to the top spot for an additional five consecutive weeks in February 2020.

== See also ==
- 2010s in music
- List of Billboard Hot 100 number-one singles of the 2010s
- Digital Song Sales
- Streaming Songs
