= Sara (Starship song) =

- Japanese single cover

Single by Starship

from the album Knee Deep in the Hoopla
- B-side: "Hearts of the World (Will Understand)"
- Released: December 1985
- Recorded: 1985
- Genre: Pop rock; soft rock
- Length: 4:52 (album version); 4:18 (edited version)
- Label: Grunt; RCA
- Composers: Peter Wolf; Ina Wolf
- Lyricist: Ina Wolf
- Producers: Peter Wolf; Jeremy Smith

Starship singles chronology
| "We Built This City" (1985) | "Sara" (1985) | "Tomorrow Doesn't Matter Tonight" (1986) |

Music video
- "Sara" on YouTube

"Sara" is a song recorded by the American rock band Starship which reached number one on the U.S. Billboard Hot 100 chart on March 15, 1986. It was sung by Mickey Thomas, of the newly renamed band Starship, from their first album Knee Deep in the Hoopla (1985), and Grace Slick provided the backing vocals.

The recording became one of the best-selling singles of 1986 in North America. It was the band's second number-one hit after the song "We Built This City" hit that mark a few months earlier in 1985. It also became the band's first number-one song on the adult contemporary chart, where it remained for three weeks. Although written by Peter and Ina Wolf, the song was named for Sara (née Kendrick), Thomas's wife at the time.

== Reception ==
Cash Box called it a "melodic ballad [that] has a biting rock edge led by Mickey Thomas' riveting vocal" and said it has "an ethereal chorus and shy guitars".

In a retrospective review from 2020, Stereogum's Tom Breihan wrote that while "'We Built This City' gets all the hate", "Sara" he opines is "even shittier", calling it a "bad, boring '80s song, and it's pretty easy to forget its existence entirely."

== Music video ==
The music video for "Sara" featured Thomas, and actress Rebecca De Mornay as the song's titular character, in a storyline about the ending of a relationship, set on a Dust Bowl farm in the Midwest, with frequent flashbacks to what is presumably the Thomas character's childhood, and the tornado that wrecked his home and took the life of his beloved mother. It was filmed, not in the Midwest, but at an old farm residence located west of Lancaster, California. It ends with a panoramic view of the farm, with Thomas walking down the dirt road Sara (De Mornay) has driven away on, with another dust cloud closing in. The flashback portions of the music video were set in the 1950s and directed by Francis Delia.

== Personnel ==
- Mickey Thomas – lead vocals
- Grace Slick – backing vocals
- Craig Chaquico – lead guitar
- Peter Sears – bass synth
- Donny Baldwin – electronic drums

Additional personnel

- Peter Wolf – keyboards, synthesizers, LinnDrum programming

== Charts ==
=== Weekly charts ===
| Chart (1986) | Peak position |
|---|---|
| Australia (Kent Music Report) | 10 |
| Austria (Ö3 Austria Top 40) | 15 |
| Belgium (Ultratop 50 Flanders) | 21 |
| Canada Top Singles (RPM) | 1 |
| Canada Adult Contemporary (RPM) | 1 |
| Finland (Suomen virallinen lista) | 18 |
| Ireland (IRMA) | 19 |
| Netherlands (Dutch Top 40) | 30 |
| Netherlands (Single Top 100) | 43 |
| New Zealand (Recorded Music NZ) | 16 |
| South Africa (Springbok) | 10 |
| Switzerland (Schweizer Hitparade) | 9 |
| UK Singles (Official Charts) | 66 |
| US Adult Contemporary (Billboard) | 1 |
| US Billboard Hot 100 | 1 |
| US Mainstream Rock Airplay (Billboard) | 12 |
| West Germany (GfK) | 15 |

=== Year-end charts ===
| Chart (1986) | Ranking |
|---|---|
| Australia (Kent Music Report) | 67 |
| Canada (RPM) | 30 |
| US Top Pop Singles (Billboard) | 24 |

== See also ==
- List of Billboard Hot 100 number ones of 1986
- List of Hot Adult Contemporary number ones of 1986
