= List of Hot 100 Airplay number-one singles of the 1990s =

The Hot 100 Airplay chart ranks the most frequently broadcast songs on US radio stations, published by Billboard magazine. Prior to December 1990, radio stations were simply asked what songs were on their playlists and what songs have recently been added. Nielsen BDS was introduced in Billboard in January 1990 and first used on the Billboard Country music chart. Billboard introduced the Top 40 Radio Monitor on December 8, 1990, as a BDS-monitored airplay chart for comparison to the Hot 100 airplay-component chart, which was determined by radio playlists. The Top 40 Radio Monitor became the official airplay component of the Hot 100 with the issue dated November 30, 1991, when the methodology of the Hot 100 was changed to utilize both BDS (airplay) and Soundscan (sales) technology. BDS measures actual airplay by monitoring radio stations continuously with computers that "listen for the unique 'audio fingerprint' of each song and register a detection every time a song is played." One of the first noticeable effects of the change in methodology was that there tended to be less turnover of the top songs. Before the switch, no song had spent at least ten weeks at number one on the Hot 100 Airplay chart, but from December 1990 until the end of the decade, 17 songs had a minimum ten-week run at the top of the chart. While the BDS technology may have had some impact as to why this was happening, the cause has also been attributed to the trends of the radio industry at the time with stations playing the same songs over longer periods of time.

In the mid-1990s, a new trend began to emerge: singles without being released commercially in an attempt to boost album sales. While not a new concept, it started becoming commonplace. With the June 17, 1995, issue, "I'll Be There for You", became the first single to top the Hot 100 Airplay chart without appearing on the Hot 100. (It would later peak at No. 17 on the Hot 100 when released as a B-side to the Rembrandts follow-up single, "This House Is Not a Home", combined with its continued but fading dominance on the radio.) More songs followed with tracks such as "Don't Speak", "Men in Black", "Fly", "Torn", and "Iris", each becoming the most played song on American pop radio, despite being ineligible to chart on the Hot 100 itself due to a lack of a commercially available single. While this practice did not end, in the Billboard issue dated December 5, 1998, policy was revised to allow "airplay-only" songs to chart on the Hot 100.

== Number-one airplay hits ==
Issue date (Note: The artist, song name, issue date and weeks at number one are those given by Billboard.)	Song	Artist(s)
1990
January 6	"Another Day in Paradise"	Phil Collins
January 13	"Another Day in Paradise"	Phil Collins
January 20	"How Am I Supposed to Live Without You"	Michael Bolton
January 27	"How Am I Supposed to Live Without You"	Michael Bolton
February 3	"Opposites Attract"	Paula Abdul with The Wild Pair
February 10	"Opposites Attract"	Paula Abdul with The Wild Pair
February 17	"Opposites Attract"	Paula Abdul with The Wild Pair
February 24	"Opposites Attract"	Paula Abdul with The Wild Pair
March 3	"Escapade"	Janet Jackson
March 10	"Escapade"	Janet Jackson
March 17	"Escapade"	Janet Jackson
March 24	"Escapade"	Janet Jackson
March 31	"Love Will Lead You Back"	Taylor Dayne
April 7	"Love Will Lead You Back"	Taylor Dayne
April 14	"Don't Wanna Fall in Love"	Jane Child
April 21	"Don't Wanna Fall in Love"	Jane Child
April 28	"Nothing Compares 2 U"	Sinéad O'Connor
May 5	"Nothing Compares 2 U"	Sinéad O'Connor
May 12	"Nothing Compares 2 U"	Sinéad O'Connor
May 19	"Nothing Compares 2 U"	Sinéad O'Connor
May 26	"Vogue"	Madonna
June 2	"Vogue"	Madonna
June 9	"Vogue"	Madonna
June 16	"It Must Have Been Love"	Roxette
June 23	"It Must Have Been Love"	Roxette
June 30	"It Must Have Been Love"	Roxette
July 7	"Step by Step"	New Kids on the Block
July 14	"She Ain't Worth It"	Glenn Medeiros featuring Bobby Brown
July 21	"She Ain't Worth It"	Glenn Medeiros featuring Bobby Brown
July 28	"She Ain't Worth It"	Glenn Medeiros featuring Bobby Brown
August 4	"Vision of Love"	Mariah Carey
August 11	"Vision of Love"	Mariah Carey
August 18	"Vision of Love"	Mariah Carey
August 25	"Come Back to Me"	Janet Jackson
September 1	"Come Back to Me"	Janet Jackson
September 8	"Release Me"	Wilson Phillips
September 15	"Release Me"	Wilson Phillips
September 22	"Release Me"	Wilson Phillips
September 29	"Something Happened on the Way to Heaven"	Phil Collins
October 6	"Something Happened on the Way to Heaven"	Phil Collins
October 13	"Praying for Time"	George Michael
October 20	"Praying for Time"	George Michael
October 27	"I Don't Have the Heart"	James Ingram
November 3	"I Don't Have the Heart"	James Ingram
November 10	"Ice Ice Baby"	Vanilla Ice
November 17	"Ice Ice Baby"	Vanilla Ice
November 24	"Love Takes Time"	Mariah Carey
December 1	"Love Takes Time"	Mariah Carey
December 8	"Love Takes Time"	Mariah Carey
December 15	"Love Takes Time"	Mariah Carey
December 22	"Because I Love You (The Postman Song)"	Stevie B
December 29	"Because I Love You (The Postman Song)"	Stevie B
1991
January 5	"Love Will Never Do (Without You)"	Janet Jackson
January 12	"Love Will Never Do (Without You)"	Janet Jackson
January 19	"Love Will Never Do (Without You)"	Janet Jackson
January 26	"Love Will Never Do (Without You)"	Janet Jackson
February 2	"Love Will Never Do (Without You)"	Janet Jackson
February 9	"Love Will Never Do (Without You)"	Janet Jackson
February 16	"Love Will Never Do (Without You)"	Janet Jackson
February 23	"Someday"	Mariah Carey
March 2	"Someday"	Mariah Carey
March 9	"Someday"	Mariah Carey
March 16	"Someday"	Mariah Carey
March 23	"Someday"	Mariah Carey
March 30	"Someday"	Mariah Carey
April 6	"Someday"	Mariah Carey
April 13	"Someday"	Mariah Carey
April 20	"Someday"	Mariah Carey
April 27	"Someday"	Mariah Carey
May 4	"Touch Me (All Night Long)"	Cathy Dennis
May 11	"Touch Me (All Night Long)"	Cathy Dennis
May 18	"Baby Baby"	Amy Grant
May 25	"Baby Baby"	Amy Grant
June 1	"Rush Rush"	Paula Abdul
June 8	"Rush Rush"	Paula Abdul
June 15	"Rush Rush"	Paula Abdul
June 22	"Rush Rush"	Paula Abdul
June 29	"Rush Rush"	Paula Abdul
July 6	"Rush Rush"	Paula Abdul
July 13	"Rush Rush"	Paula Abdul
July 20	"Rush Rush"	Paula Abdul
July 27	"Rush Rush"	Paula Abdul
August 3	"(Everything I Do) I Do It for You"	Bryan Adams
August 10	"(Everything I Do) I Do It for You"	Bryan Adams
August 17	"(Everything I Do) I Do It for You"	Bryan Adams
August 24	"(Everything I Do) I Do It for You"	Bryan Adams
August 31	"(Everything I Do) I Do It for You"	Bryan Adams
September 7	"(Everything I Do) I Do It for You"	Bryan Adams
September 14	"(Everything I Do) I Do It for You"	Bryan Adams
September 21	"(Everything I Do) I Do It for You"	Bryan Adams
September 28	"I Adore Mi Amor"	Color Me Badd
October 5	"I Adore Mi Amor"	Color Me Badd
October 12	"I Adore Mi Amor"	Color Me Badd
October 19	"Emotions"	Mariah Carey
October 26	"Emotions"	Mariah Carey
November 2	"Emotions"	Mariah Carey
November 9	"Emotions"	Mariah Carey
November 16	"When a Man Loves a Woman"	Michael Bolton
November 23	"When a Man Loves a Woman"	Michael Bolton
November 30	"When a Man Loves a Woman"	Michael Bolton
December 7	"Black or White"	Michael Jackson
December 14	"Black or White"	Michael Jackson
December 21	"Black or White"	Michael Jackson
December 28	"Black or White"	Michael Jackson
1992
January 4	"All 4 Love"	Color Me Badd
January 11	"All 4 Love"	Color Me Badd
January 18	"All 4 Love"	Color Me Badd
January 25	"All 4 Love"	Color Me Badd
February 1	"I Love Your Smile"	Shanice
February 8	"I Love Your Smile"	Shanice
February 15	"I Love Your Smile"	Shanice
February 22	"I Love Your Smile"	Shanice
February 29	"I Love Your Smile"	Shanice
March 7	"Remember the Time"	Michael Jackson
March 14	"Remember the Time"	Michael Jackson
March 21	"Save the Best for Last"	Vanessa Williams
March 28	"Save the Best for Last"	Vanessa Williams
April 4	"Save the Best for Last"	Vanessa Williams
April 11	"Save the Best for Last"	Vanessa Williams
April 18	"Save the Best for Last"	Vanessa Williams
April 25	"Save the Best for Last"	Vanessa Williams
May 2	"Save the Best for Last"	Vanessa Williams
May 9	"Save the Best for Last"	Vanessa Williams
May 16	"My Lovin' (You're Never Gonna Get It)"	En Vogue
May 23	"My Lovin' (You're Never Gonna Get It)"	En Vogue
May 30	"My Lovin' (You're Never Gonna Get It)"	En Vogue
June 6	"My Lovin' (You're Never Gonna Get It)"	En Vogue
June 13	"I'll Be There"	Mariah Carey
June 20	"I'll Be There"	Mariah Carey
June 27	"I'll Be There"	Mariah Carey
July 4	"I'll Be There"	Mariah Carey
July 11	"I'll Be There"	Mariah Carey
July 18	"I'll Be There"	Mariah Carey
July 25	"I'll Be There"	Mariah Carey
August 1	"I'll Be There"	Mariah Carey
August 8	"Baby-Baby-Baby"	TLC
August 15	"Baby-Baby-Baby"	TLC
August 22	"End of the Road"	Boyz II Men
August 29	"End of the Road"	Boyz II Men
September 5	"End of the Road"	Boyz II Men
September 12	"End of the Road"	Boyz II Men
September 19	"End of the Road"	Boyz II Men
September 26	"End of the Road"	Boyz II Men
October 3	"End of the Road"	Boyz II Men
October 10	"End of the Road"	Boyz II Men
October 17	"End of the Road"	Boyz II Men
October 24	"End of the Road"	Boyz II Men
October 31	"End of the Road"	Boyz II Men
November 7	"End of the Road"	Boyz II Men
November 14	"End of the Road"	Boyz II Men
November 21	"I'd Die Without You"	P.M. Dawn
November 28	"I'd Die Without You"	P.M. Dawn
December 5	"I Will Always Love You"	Whitney Houston
December 12	"I Will Always Love You"	Whitney Houston
December 19	"I Will Always Love You"	Whitney Houston
December 26	"I Will Always Love You"	Whitney Houston
1993
January 2	"I Will Always Love You"	Whitney Houston
January 9	"I Will Always Love You"	Whitney Houston
January 16	"I Will Always Love You"	Whitney Houston
January 23	"I Will Always Love You"	Whitney Houston
January 30	"I Will Always Love You"	Whitney Houston
February 6	"I Will Always Love You"	Whitney Houston
February 13	"I Will Always Love You"	Whitney Houston
February 20	"A Whole New World"	Peabo Bryson & Regina Belle
February 27	"A Whole New World"	Peabo Bryson & Regina Belle
March 6	"A Whole New World"	Peabo Bryson & Regina Belle
March 13	"A Whole New World"	Peabo Bryson & Regina Belle
March 20	"I Have Nothing"	Whitney Houston
March 27	"I Have Nothing"	Whitney Houston
April 3	"I Have Nothing"	Whitney Houston
April 10	"I Have Nothing"	Whitney Houston
April 17	"I Have Nothing"	Whitney Houston
April 24	"I Have Nothing"	Whitney Houston
May 1	"Freak Me"	Silk
May 8	"Freak Me"	Silk
May 15	"Freak Me"	Silk
May 22	"That's the Way Love Goes"	Janet Jackson
May 29	"That's the Way Love Goes"	Janet Jackson
June 5	"That's the Way Love Goes"	Janet Jackson
June 12	"That's the Way Love Goes"	Janet Jackson
June 19	"That's the Way Love Goes"	Janet Jackson
June 26	"That's the Way Love Goes"	Janet Jackson
July 3	"That's the Way Love Goes"	Janet Jackson
July 10	"That's the Way Love Goes"	Janet Jackson
July 17	"That's the Way Love Goes"	Janet Jackson
July 24	"That's the Way Love Goes"	Janet Jackson
July 31	"Can't Help Falling in Love"	UB40
August 7	"Can't Help Falling in Love"	UB40
August 14	"Can't Help Falling in Love"	UB40
August 21	"Can't Help Falling in Love"	UB40
August 28	"Dreamlover"	Mariah Carey
September 4	"Dreamlover"	Mariah Carey
September 11	"Dreamlover"	Mariah Carey
September 18	"Dreamlover"	Mariah Carey
September 25	"Dreamlover"	Mariah Carey
October 2	"Dreamlover"	Mariah Carey
October 9	"Dreamlover"	Mariah Carey
October 16	"Dreamlover"	Mariah Carey
October 23	"Dreamlover"	Mariah Carey
October 30	"Dreamlover"	Mariah Carey
November 6	"Dreamlover"	Mariah Carey
November 13	"Again"	Janet Jackson
November 20	"Again"	Janet Jackson
November 27	"Again"	Janet Jackson
December 4	"Again"	Janet Jackson
December 11	"Hero"	Mariah Carey
December 18	"Hero"	Mariah Carey
December 25	"Hero"	Mariah Carey
1994
January 1	"Hero"	Mariah Carey
January 8	"Hero"	Mariah Carey
January 15	"Hero"	Mariah Carey
January 22	"Hero"	Mariah Carey
January 29	"Hero"	Mariah Carey
February 5	"Hero"	Mariah Carey
February 12	"Hero"	Mariah Carey
February 19	"Breathe Again"	Toni Braxton
February 26	"The Sign"	Ace of Base
March 5	"The Sign"	Ace of Base
March 12	"The Sign"	Ace of Base
March 19	"The Sign"	Ace of Base
March 26	"The Sign"	Ace of Base
April 2	"The Sign"	Ace of Base
April 9	"The Sign"	Ace of Base
April 16	"The Sign"	Ace of Base
April 23	"The Sign"	Ace of Base
April 30	"The Sign"	Ace of Base
May 7	"The Sign"	Ace of Base
May 14	"The Sign"	Ace of Base
May 21	"The Sign"	Ace of Base
May 28	"I Swear"	All-4-One
June 4	"I Swear"	All-4-One
June 11	"I Swear"	All-4-One
June 18	"I Swear"	All-4-One
June 25	"I Swear"	All-4-One
July 2	"I Swear"	All-4-One
July 9	"I Swear"	All-4-One
July 16	"I Swear"	All-4-One
July 23	"I Swear"	All-4-One
July 30	"Don't Turn Around"	Ace of Base
August 6	"Don't Turn Around"	Ace of Base
August 13	"Stay (I Missed You)"	Lisa Loeb & Nine Stories
August 20	"Stay (I Missed You)"	Lisa Loeb & Nine Stories
August 27	"Stay (I Missed You)"	Lisa Loeb & Nine Stories
September 3	"Stay (I Missed You)"	Lisa Loeb & Nine Stories
September 10	"I'll Make Love to You"	Boyz II Men
September 17	"I'll Make Love to You"	Boyz II Men
September 24	"I'll Make Love to You"	Boyz II Men
October 1	"I'll Make Love to You"	Boyz II Men
October 8	"I'll Make Love to You"	Boyz II Men
October 15	"I'll Make Love to You"	Boyz II Men
October 22	"I'll Make Love to You"	Boyz II Men
October 29	"I'll Make Love to You"	Boyz II Men
November 5	"I'll Make Love to You"	Boyz II Men
November 12	"I'll Make Love to You"	Boyz II Men
November 19	"I'll Make Love to You"	Boyz II Men
November 26	"I'll Make Love to You"	Boyz II Men
December 3	"On Bended Knee"	Boyz II Men
December 10	"On Bended Knee"	Boyz II Men
December 17	"On Bended Knee"	Boyz II Men
December 24	"On Bended Knee"	Boyz II Men
December 31	"On Bended Knee"	Boyz II Men
1995
January 7	"On Bended Knee"	Boyz II Men
January 14	"On Bended Knee"	Boyz II Men
January 21	"On Bended Knee"	Boyz II Men
January 28	"On Bended Knee"	Boyz II Men
February 4	"On Bended Knee"	Boyz II Men
February 11	"On Bended Knee"	Boyz II Men
February 18	"Take a Bow"	Madonna
February 25	"Take a Bow"	Madonna
March 4	"Take a Bow"	Madonna
March 11	"Take a Bow"	Madonna
March 18	"Take a Bow"	Madonna
March 25	"Take a Bow"	Madonna
April 1	"Take a Bow"	Madonna
April 8	"Take a Bow"	Madonna
April 15	"Take a Bow"	Madonna
April 22	"I Know"	Dionne Farris
April 29	"I Know"	Dionne Farris
May 6	"I Know"	Dionne Farris
May 13	"I Know"	Dionne Farris
May 20	"I Know"	Dionne Farris
May 27	"I Know"	Dionne Farris
June 3	"I Know"	Dionne Farris
June 10	"Water Runs Dry"	Boyz II Men
June 17	"I'll Be There for You"	The Rembrandts
June 24	"I'll Be There for You"	The Rembrandts
July 1	"I'll Be There for You"	The Rembrandts
July 8	"I'll Be There for You"	The Rembrandts
July 15	"I'll Be There for You"	The Rembrandts
July 22	"I'll Be There for You"	The Rembrandts
July 29	"I'll Be There for You"	The Rembrandts
August 5	"I'll Be There for You"	The Rembrandts
August 12	"Kiss from a Rose"	Seal
August 19	"Kiss from a Rose"	Seal
August 26	"Kiss from a Rose"	Seal
September 2	"Kiss from a Rose"	Seal
September 9	"Kiss from a Rose"	Seal
September 16	"Kiss from a Rose"	Seal
September 23	"Kiss from a Rose"	Seal
September 30	"Kiss from a Rose"	Seal
October 7	"Kiss from a Rose"	Seal
October 14	"Kiss from a Rose"	Seal
October 21	"Fantasy"	Mariah Carey
October 28	"Fantasy"	Mariah Carey
November 4	"Fantasy"	Mariah Carey
November 11	"Fantasy"	Mariah Carey
November 18	"Fantasy"	Mariah Carey
November 25	"Fantasy"	Mariah Carey
December 2	"Fantasy"	Mariah Carey
December 9	"One Sweet Day"	Mariah Carey and Boyz II Men
December 16	"One Sweet Day"	Mariah Carey and Boyz II Men
December 23	"One Sweet Day"	Mariah Carey and Boyz II Men
December 30	"One Sweet Day"	Mariah Carey and Boyz II Men
1996
January 6	"One Sweet Day"	Mariah Carey and Boyz II Men
January 13	"One Sweet Day"	Mariah Carey and Boyz II Men
January 20	"One Sweet Day"	Mariah Carey and Boyz II Men
January 27	"One Sweet Day"	Mariah Carey and Boyz II Men
February 3	"One Sweet Day"	Mariah Carey and Boyz II Men
February 10	"One Sweet Day"	Mariah Carey and Boyz II Men
February 17	"One Sweet Day"	Mariah Carey and Boyz II Men
February 24	"One Sweet Day"	Mariah Carey and Boyz II Men
March 2	"One Sweet Day"	Mariah Carey and Boyz II Men
March 9	"Missing"	Everything but the Girl
March 16	"Missing"	Everything but the Girl
March 23	"Missing"	Everything but the Girl
March 30	"Missing"	Everything but the Girl
April 6	"Missing"	Everything but the Girl
April 13	"Because You Loved Me"	Celine Dion
April 20	"Because You Loved Me"	Celine Dion
April 27	"Because You Loved Me"	Celine Dion
May 4	"Because You Loved Me"	Celine Dion
May 11	"Because You Loved Me"	Celine Dion
May 18	"Because You Loved Me"	Celine Dion
May 25	"Because You Loved Me"	Celine Dion
June 1	"Because You Loved Me"	Celine Dion
June 8	"Because You Loved Me"	Celine Dion
June 15	"Because You Loved Me"	Celine Dion
June 22	"Because You Loved Me"	Celine Dion
June 29	"Because You Loved Me"	Celine Dion
July 6	"Because You Loved Me"	Celine Dion
July 13	"Because You Loved Me"	Celine Dion
July 20	"You Learn"	Alanis Morissette
July 27	"You Learn"	Alanis Morissette
August 3	"You Learn"	Alanis Morissette
August 10	"You Learn"	Alanis Morissette
August 17	"You Learn"	Alanis Morissette
August 24	"I Love You Always Forever"	Donna Lewis
August 31	"I Love You Always Forever"	Donna Lewis
September 7	"I Love You Always Forever"	Donna Lewis
September 14	"I Love You Always Forever"	Donna Lewis
September 21	"I Love You Always Forever"	Donna Lewis
September 28	"I Love You Always Forever"	Donna Lewis
October 5	"I Love You Always Forever"	Donna Lewis
October 12	"I Love You Always Forever"	Donna Lewis
October 19	"I Love You Always Forever"	Donna Lewis
October 26	"I Love You Always Forever"	Donna Lewis
November 2	"I Love You Always Forever"	Donna Lewis
November 9	"I Love You Always Forever"	Donna Lewis
November 16	"It's All Coming Back to Me Now"	Celine Dion
November 23	"It's All Coming Back to Me Now"	Celine Dion
November 30	"I Love You Always Forever"	Donna Lewis
December 7	"Don't Speak"	No Doubt
December 14	"Don't Speak"	No Doubt
December 21	"Don't Speak"	No Doubt
December 28	"Don't Speak"	No Doubt
1997
January 4	"Don't Speak"	No Doubt
January 11	"Don't Speak"	No Doubt
January 18	"Un-Break My Heart"	Toni Braxton
January 25	"Un-Break My Heart"	Toni Braxton
February 1	"Don't Speak"	No Doubt
February 8	"Don't Speak"	No Doubt
February 15	"Don't Speak"	No Doubt
February 22	"Don't Speak"	No Doubt
March 1	"Don't Speak"	No Doubt
March 8	"Don't Speak"	No Doubt
March 15	"Don't Speak"	No Doubt
March 22	"Don't Speak"	No Doubt
March 29	"Don't Speak"	No Doubt
April 5	"Don't Speak"	No Doubt
April 12	"You Were Meant for Me"	Jewel
April 19	"You Were Meant for Me"	Jewel
April 26	"You Were Meant for Me"	Jewel
May 3	"You Were Meant for Me"	Jewel
May 10	"You Were Meant for Me"	Jewel
May 17	"You Were Meant for Me"	Jewel
May 24	"You Were Meant for Me"	Jewel
May 31	"You Were Meant for Me"	Jewel
June 7	"You Were Meant for Me"	Jewel
June 14	"MMMBop"	Hanson
June 21	"MMMBop"	Hanson
June 28	"MMMBop"	Hanson
July 5	"MMMBop"	Hanson
July 12	"Sunny Came Home"	Shawn Colvin
July 19	"Sunny Came Home"	Shawn Colvin
July 26	"Sunny Came Home"	Shawn Colvin
August 2	"Sunny Came Home"	Shawn Colvin
August 9	"Men in Black"	Will Smith
August 16	"Men in Black"	Will Smith
August 23	"Men in Black"	Will Smith
August 30	"Men in Black"	Will Smith
September 6	"Semi-Charmed Life"	Third Eye Blind
September 13	"Semi-Charmed Life"	Third Eye Blind
September 20	"Semi-Charmed Life"	Third Eye Blind
September 27	"Foolish Games"	Jewel
October 4	"Foolish Games"	Jewel
October 11	"Foolish Games"	Jewel
October 18	"Fly"	Sugar Ray
October 25	"Fly"	Sugar Ray
November 1	"Fly"	Sugar Ray
November 8	"Fly"	Sugar Ray
November 15	"Fly"	Sugar Ray
November 22	"Fly"	Sugar Ray
November 29	"Tubthumping"	Chumbawamba
December 6	"Tubthumping"	Chumbawamba
December 13	"Tubthumping"	Chumbawamba
December 20	"Tubthumping"	Chumbawamba
December 27	"Tubthumping"	Chumbawamba
1998
January 3	"Tubthumping"	Chumbawamba
January 10	"Tubthumping"	Chumbawamba
January 17	"Tubthumping"	Chumbawamba
January 24	"Tubthumping"	Chumbawamba
January 31	"My Heart Will Go On"	Celine Dion
February 7	"My Heart Will Go On"	Celine Dion
February 14	"My Heart Will Go On"	Celine Dion
February 21	"My Heart Will Go On"	Celine Dion
February 28	"My Heart Will Go On"	Celine Dion
March 7	"My Heart Will Go On"	Celine Dion
March 14	"My Heart Will Go On"	Celine Dion
March 21	"My Heart Will Go On"	Celine Dion
March 28	"My Heart Will Go On"	Celine Dion
April 4	"My Heart Will Go On"	Celine Dion
April 11	"Truly Madly Deeply"	Savage Garden
April 18	"Truly Madly Deeply"	Savage Garden
April 25	"Truly Madly Deeply"	Savage Garden
May 2	"Truly Madly Deeply"	Savage Garden
May 9	"Truly Madly Deeply"	Savage Garden
May 16	"Torn"	Natalie Imbruglia
May 23	"Torn"	Natalie Imbruglia
May 30	"Torn"	Natalie Imbruglia
June 6	"Torn"	Natalie Imbruglia
June 13	"Torn"	Natalie Imbruglia
June 20	"Torn"	Natalie Imbruglia
June 27	"Torn"	Natalie Imbruglia
July 4	"Torn"	Natalie Imbruglia
July 11	"Torn"	Natalie Imbruglia
July 18	"Torn"	Natalie Imbruglia
July 25	"Torn"	Natalie Imbruglia
August 1	"Iris"	Goo Goo Dolls
August 8	"Iris"	Goo Goo Dolls
August 15	"Iris"	Goo Goo Dolls
August 22	"Iris"	Goo Goo Dolls
August 29	"Iris"	Goo Goo Dolls
September 5	"Iris"	Goo Goo Dolls
September 12	"Iris"	Goo Goo Dolls
September 19	"Iris"	Goo Goo Dolls
September 26	"Iris"	Goo Goo Dolls
October 3	"I Don't Want to Miss a Thing"	Aerosmith
October 10	"Iris"	Goo Goo Dolls
October 17	"Iris"	Goo Goo Dolls
October 24	"Iris"	Goo Goo Dolls
October 31	"Iris"	Goo Goo Dolls
November 7	"Iris"	Goo Goo Dolls
November 14	"Iris"	Goo Goo Dolls
November 21	"Iris"	Goo Goo Dolls
November 28	"Iris"	Goo Goo Dolls
December 5	"Iris"	Goo Goo Dolls
December 12	"Lullaby"	Shawn Mullins
December 19	"Lullaby"	Shawn Mullins
December 26	"Have You Ever?"	Brandy
1999
January 2	"Have You Ever?"	Brandy
January 9	"Have You Ever?"	Brandy
January 16	"Have You Ever?"	Brandy
January 23	"Have You Ever?"	Brandy
January 30	"Have You Ever?"	Brandy
February 6	"Have You Ever?"	Brandy
February 13	"Have You Ever?"	Brandy
February 20	"Have You Ever?"	Brandy
February 27	"Slide"	Goo Goo Dolls
March 6	"Angel of Mine"	Monica
March 13	"Angel of Mine"	Monica
March 20	"No Scrubs"	TLC
March 27	"No Scrubs"	TLC
April 3	"No Scrubs"	TLC
April 10	"No Scrubs"	TLC
April 17	"No Scrubs"	TLC
April 24	"No Scrubs"	TLC
May 1	"No Scrubs"	TLC
May 8	"No Scrubs"	TLC
May 15	"No Scrubs"	TLC
May 22	"No Scrubs"	TLC
May 29	"No Scrubs"	TLC
June 5	"No Scrubs"	TLC
June 12	"No Scrubs"	TLC
June 19	"Livin' La Vida Loca"	Ricky Martin
June 26	"Livin' La Vida Loca"	Ricky Martin
July 3	"Livin' La Vida Loca"	Ricky Martin
July 10	"Livin' La Vida Loca"	Ricky Martin
July 17	"I Want It That Way"	Backstreet Boys
July 24	"I Want It That Way"	Backstreet Boys
July 31	"I Want It That Way"	Backstreet Boys
August 7	"All Star"	Smash Mouth
August 14	"All Star"	Smash Mouth
August 21	"All Star"	Smash Mouth
August 28	"All Star"	Smash Mouth
September 4	"All Star"	Smash Mouth
September 11	"Genie in a Bottle"	Christina Aguilera
September 18	"Genie in a Bottle"	Christina Aguilera
September 25	"Genie in a Bottle"	Christina Aguilera
October 2	"Mambo #5"	Lou Bega
October 9	"Mambo #5"	Lou Bega
October 16	"Mambo #5"	Lou Bega
October 23	"Mambo #5"	Lou Bega
October 30	"Mambo #5"	Lou Bega
November 6	"Mambo #5"	Lou Bega
November 13	"Smooth"	Santana featuring Rob Thomas
November 20	"Smooth"	Santana featuring Rob Thomas
November 27	"Smooth"	Santana featuring Rob Thomas
December 4	"Smooth"	Santana featuring Rob Thomas
December 11	"Smooth"	Santana featuring Rob Thomas
December 18	"Back at One"	Brian McKnight
December 25	"Back at One"	Brian McKnight

== See also ==
- 1990s in music
- List of Hot 100 number-one singles of the 1990s (U.S.)

== Notes and references ==
=== Additional sources ===
- Whitburn, Joel. The Billboard Book of Top 40 Hits. (2004) ISBN 0-8230-7499-4
- Billboard Biz
