= Diva (Dana International song) =

1998 song by Dana International

Single by Dana International

from the album Free
- Language: Hebrew
- Released: 25 May 1998
- Genre: Eurodance; disco
- Length: 3:02
- Label: CNR; Dance Pool
- Composer: Tzvika Pick
- Lyricist: Yoav Ginai
- Producers: Offer Nissim; arrangements by Alon Levin

Dana International singles chronology
"Diva" (1998)	"Makat hom (i la dirla da da)" (2002)

Eurovision Song Contest 1998 entry
- Country: Israel
- Artist: Dana International
- Language: Hebrew
- Composer: Tzvika Pick
- Lyricist: Yoav Ginai

Finals performance
- Final result: 1st
- Final points: 172 (Note: After the broadcast it was announced that Televisión Española wrongly tallied the Spanish votes and Germany should have got the top mark – 12 points – instead of being snubbed, as it happened. The mistake was corrected and so Germany was placed seventh over Norway. Israel and Norway both received two points less than originally and Croatia, Malta, Portugal, the United Kingdom, Netherlands, Belgium, Estonia and Turkey all received one point less than indicated during the broadcast. Originally Estonia, Cyprus and Portugal had tied for 11th place with 37 points but because Portugal and Estonia received one point less than indicated during the broadcast, Cyprus was placed 11th over Estonia and Portugal.)

Entry chronology
- ◄ "Amen" (1995)
- "Yom Huledet (Happy Birthday)" (1999) ►

Official performance video
- "Diva" on YouTube

"Diva" (Hebrew: דיווה) is a song recorded by Israeli singer Dana International with music composed by Tzvika Pick and lyrics written by Yoav Ginai. It represented Israel in the Eurovision Song Contest 1998 held in Birmingham, resulting in the country's third win in the contest. Her win is considered influential in making transexual identity mainstream.

== Background ==
=== Conception ===
The music of "Diva" was composed by Svika Pick, with lyrics written by Yoav Ginai. The song was produced by Offer Nissim with music arrangements by Alon Levin. It was recorded by Dana International in Hebrew and English and was included on her fifth album, Free, released in 1999.

The song is a moderately uptempo number. It is an ode to powerful women of history and mythology: Victoria, the Roman goddess of victory or Queen Victoria, Aphrodite, the Greek goddess of beauty and love, and the Greek queen Cleopatra are named.

=== Eurovision ===
The Israeli Broadcasting Authority (IBA) internally selected "Diva" as its song for the 43rd edition of the Eurovision Song Contest, becoming the Israeli entry – and Dana International the performer – for the contest. Dana was selected out of fifteen entries in November 1997. The selection already triggered concern from conservative Jewish sections of the population.

On 9 May 1998, the Eurovision Song Contest was held at the National Indoor Arena in Birmingham hosted by the British Broadcasting Corporation (BBC) and broadcast live throughout the continent. The selection of Dana International's song caused so much controversy amongst conservative groups in Israel that on her arrival in Britain, police escorts and security were required continuously. She performed "Diva" in Hebrew eighth on the evening, following Poland's "To takie proste" by Sixteen and preceding Germany's "Guildo hat euch lieb!" by Guildo Horn. She wore a silver blue dress designed by Israeli designer Galit Levi and was backed by four other female singers wearing black. It involved no dancing and no live orchestral accompaniment.

At the close of voting, the song had received 172 points, placing first in a field of twenty-five, and winning the contest. After the results were announced, Dana International caused a stir by arriving to the presentation late after a long delay, because she changed into an extravagant costume designed by Jean-Paul Gaultier adorned with bird feathers before performing the reprise. This was Israel's third victory in the contest and, as they had not entered the previous year's contest, they achieved the unusual distinction of having won a contest the year after not competing.

The song became the last entry entirely in a language other than English to win the contest until 2007. As the song did not have any live orchestral accompaniment, the interval act was the last time live music from an orchestra was used in the contest, as the 1999 contest lacked the necessary budget and was held in a venue not large enough to hold one. The song was succeeded in 1999 as contest winner by "Take Me to Your Heaven" by Charlotte Nilsson for Sweden. It was succeeded as Israeli representative at the 1999 contest by "Yom Huledet (Happy Birthday)" by Eden.

=== Aftermath ===
Dana International's win is considered influential in making transexual identity mainstream, in part because she is transexual.

"Diva" was one of fourteen songs chosen by Eurovision fans and a European Broadcasting Union (EBU) reference group, from among the 992 songs that had ever participated in the contest, to participate in the fiftieth anniversary competition Congratulations: 50 Years of the Eurovision Song Contest held on 22 October 2005 in Copenhagen. It was re-enacted by Dana International along with six dancers equipped with giant feathered fans and a live orchestra as the original footage was shown in the background. It came 13th in the final voting.

Dana International would go on to participate in the 2011 contest with "Ding Dong" placing 15th in the second semi-final and not competing in the grand final. On 31 March 2015, she performed "Diva" in the Eurovision sixtieth anniversary show Eurovision Song Contest's Greatest Hits held in London. On 18 May 2019, she performed it as part of the opening act of the 2019 contest grand final held in Tel Aviv.

== Track listings ==
- UK and Australian CD1
1. "Diva" (English radio version) – 3:03
2. "Diva" (Hebrew radio version) – 3:03
3. "Diva" (Handbaggers remix) – 7:17
4. "Diva" (G's Heavenly vocal) – 6:04
5. "Diva" (G's Heavenly dub) – 7:28
- UK and Australian CD2
1. "Diva" (English radio version) – 3:03
2. "Diva" (Sleaze Sisters Paradise Revisited 7-inch) – 3:26
3. "Diva" (Sleaze Sisters Paradise Revisited 12-inch) – 6:39
4. "Diva" (Sleaze Sisters Euro Anthem) – 7:08
5. "Diva" (Sleaze Sisters Paradise Revisited instrumental) – 6:39
- UK cassette single
1. "Diva" (English radio version) – 3:03
2. "Diva" (Hebrew radio version) – 3:03
- European CD single
1. "Diva" (English version) – 3:01
2. "Diva" (Hebrew version) – 3:01
- European remixes CD single
1. "Diva" (original English version) – 3:01
2. "Diva" (C & W Project mix) – 7:10
3. "Diva" (Handbaggers remix) – 7:17
4. "Diva" (Sleaze Sisters Paradise Revisited 12-inch) – 6:38
- French remixes 12-inch single

A1. "Diva" (Handbaggers remix) – 7:18
A2. "Diva" (C & W Project mix) – 7:10
B1. "Diva" (Sleaze Sisters Paradise Revisited) – 6:40
B2. "Diva" (original English 7-inch version) – 3:01

=== Digital release ===
Despite its legacy as a well remembered Eurovision winner, as of 2018, the song was unavailable on digital music platforms (with the sole exception of Scandinavia). Efforts were made to get the rights holders to release the song digitally; the efforts finally paid off, as on 11 April 2019 the English version of the song was released, with the Hebrew version following the week after.

== Charts ==
=== Weekly charts ===
Weekly chart performance for "Diva"
Chart (1998)	Peak position
Australia (ARIA)	63
Austria (Ö3 Austria Top 40)	37
Belgium (Ultratop 50 Flanders)	2
Belgium (Ultratop 50 Wallonia)	4
Europe (Eurochart Hot 100)	13
Finland (Suomen virallinen lista)	7
France (SNEP)	59
Germany (GfK)	47
Iceland (Íslenski Listinn Topp 40)	24
Ireland (IRMA)	10
Netherlands (Dutch Top 40)	11
Netherlands (Single Top 100)	11
Norway (VG-lista)	12
Scottish Singles Sales (Official Charts)	8
Sweden (Sverigetopplistan)	3
Switzerland (Schweizer Hitparade)	15
UK Singles (Official Charts)	11

=== Year-end charts ===
Year-end chart performance for "Diva"
Chart (1998)	Position
Belgium (Ultratop 50 Flanders)	27
Belgium (Ultratop 50 Wallonia)	55
Europe Border Breakers (Music & Media)	46
Sweden (Hitlistan)	34

== Certifications ==
Certifications and sales for "Diva"
Region	Certification	Certified units/sales
Belgium (BRMA)	Gold	25,000^{*}
Sweden (GLF)	Gold	15,000^{^}
^{*} Sales figures based on certification alone.^{^} Shipments figures based on certification alone.

== Notes ==
Preceded by "Love Shine a Light" by Katrina and the Waves	Eurovision Song Contest winners 1998	Succeeded by "Take Me to Your Heaven" by Charlotte Nilsson
