= Estonia in the Eurovision Song Contest 1998 =

- Eurovision Song Contest 1998
- Participating broadcaster: Eesti Televisioon (ETV)
- Country: Estonia
- Selection process: Eurolaul '98
- Selection date: 24 January 1998

Competing entry
- Song: "Mere lapsed"
- Artist: Koit Toome
- Songwriters: Maria Rahula; Tomi Rahula; Peeter Pruuli

Placement
- Final result: 12th, 36 points

Participation chronology

Estonia was represented at the Eurovision Song Contest 1998 with the song "Mere lapsed", composed by Maria Rahula and Tomi Rahula, with lyrics by Peeter Pruuli, and performed by Koit Toome. The Estonian participating broadcaster, Eesti Televisioon (ETV), organised the national final Eurolaul '98 in order to select its entry for the contest. Ten songs competed in the national final and "Mere lapsed" performed by Koit Toome was selected as the winner by a jury panel.

Estonia competed in the Eurovision Song Contest which took place on 9 May 1998. Performing during the show in position 23, Estonia placed twelfth out of the 25 participating countries, scoring 36 points.

== Background ==
Prior to the 1998 contest, Eesti Televisioon (ETV) had participated in the Eurovision Song Contest representing Estonia three times since its first entry in 1994. Its best result in the contest was fifth, which was achieved in in 1996 with the song "Kaelakee hääl" performed by Maarja-Liis Ilus and Ivo Linna. In 1997, "Keelatud maa" performed by Maarja (in her second consecutive Eurovision appearance) placed eighth.

As part of its duties as participating broadcaster, ETV organises the selection of its entry in the Eurovision Song Contest and broadcasts the event in the country. Since its debut, the broadcaster has organised national finals that feature a competition among multiple artists and songs in order to select its entry for the contest. ETV has organised the Eurolaul competition since 1996 in order to select its entry, with the broadcaster organising Eurolaul '98 in order to select its 1998 entry.

== Before Eurovision ==
=== Eurolaul '98 ===
Eurolaul '98 was the fifth edition of the Estonian national selection Eurolaul organised by ETV to select its entry for the Eurovision Song Contest 1998. The competition consisted of a ten-song final on 24 January 1998 at the ETV studios in Tallinn, hosted by Marko Reikop and Anu Välba and broadcast on ETV.

==== Competing entries ====
ETV opened the submission period for artists and composers to submit their entries up until 15 December 1997. 51 submissions were received by the deadline. An 11-member jury panel selected ten finalists from the submissions and the selected songs were announced on 17 December 1997 during the ETV program Eurolaul '98 eelvoor. The selection jury consisted of Nancy Himma (singer), Ingrid Tähismaa (journalist), Romi Erlach (Raadio 2 presenter), Kaidi Klein (PolyGram label manager), Raivo Tafenau (saxophonist), Jaak Joala (musician), Tõnis Kõrvits (arranger), Heli Pikk (Eesti Raadio phono library manager), Allan Roosileht (Raadio 2 music editor), Olavi Pihlamägi (Raadio Uuno director) and Paul Himma (Estonian National Opera general director). Among the competing artists were Janika Sillamaa (who represented Estonia in 1993), and Ivo Linna (who represented Estonia in 1996 together with Maarja-Liis Ilus). Evelin Samuel, Karl Madis, Kate, Koit Toome and Tõnis Mägi have all competed in previous editions of Eurolaul.

Artist	Song	Songwriter(s)
Evelin Samuel	"Unistus igavesest päevast"	Kaari Sillamaa, Priit Pajusaar, Glen Pilvre
Evelin Samuel and Ivo Linna	"Andesta"	Kaari Sillamaa, Priit Pajusaar, Glen Pilvre
Janika Sillamaa	"Viimne valge kuu"	Kaari Sillamaa, Koit Toome
Kaire Vilgats and Lauri Liiv	"Kristallid"	Argo Kasela, Kalle Erm
Kate	"Tulepuuhuulte luule"	Villu Kangur, Aivar Joonas
Koit Toome	"Mere lapsed"	Peeter Pruuli, Maria Rahula, Tomi Rahula
Mona and Karl Madis	"Maailm kahele"	Sven Lõhmus
Rumal Noorkuu	"Säravad tähed"	Villu Olesk, Ivar Must
Siiri Sisask	"Tagareas"	Lauri Saatpalu
Tõnis Mägi	"Mõni mägi"	Tõnis Mägi

==== Final ====
The final took place on 24 January 1998. Ten songs competed during the show and a jury selected "Mere lapsed" performed by Koit Toome as the winner. A non-competitive public televote was also held and also selected Toome as the winner. The jury panel that voted in the final consisted of Jordi Català from Spain, Séamus Crimmins from Ireland, Máté Victor from Hungary, Hans Barksjö from Sweden, Birte Krohn from Germany, Kato Hansen from Norway, Erkki Pohjanheimo from Finland, Tanya Peck from the United Kingdom, Erman Munis from Turkey, Jos Moons from Belgium, and Jacques Donzel from Switzerland.

Final – 24 January 1998
R/O	Artist	Song	Jury Votes											Total	Place
R/O	Artist	Song	J. Català	S. Crimmins	M. Victor	H. Barksjö	B. Krohn	K. Hansen	E. Pohjanheimo	T. Peck	E. Munis	J. Moons	J. Donzel	Total	Place
1	Koit Toome	"Mere lapsed"	5	7	10	2	12	7	10	10	12	10	12	97	1
2	Kaire Vilgats and Lauri Liiv	"Kristallid"	7	6	4	1	7	4	5	3	3	3	4	47	8
3	Kate	"Tulepuuhuulte luule"	10	8	12	3	2	6	12	7	10	6	3	79	3
4	Evelin Samuel	"Unistus igavesest päevast"	3	12	8	10	8	12	8	12	4	12	5	94	2
5	Rumal Noorkuu	"Säravad tähed"	12	10	1	8	6	5	1	6	7	7	2	65	5
6	Tõnis Mägi	"Mõni mägi"	2	5	5	5	5	2	2	2	2	5	1	36	10
7	Siiri Sisask	"Tagareas"	1	3	7	12	3	1	6	5	8	1	6	53	7
8	Janika Sillamaa	"Viimne valge kuu"	6	4	6	4	4	10	7	8	6	4	10	69	4
9	Mona and Karl Madis	"Maailm kahele"	4	2	2	6	1	8	4	4	1	2	8	42	9
10	Evelin Samuel and Ivo Linna	"Andesta"	8	1	3	7	10	3	3	1	5	8	7	56	6

== At Eurovision ==
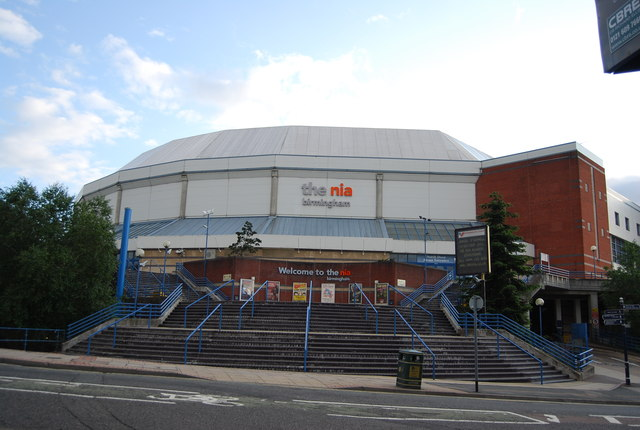
The Eurovision Song Contest 1998 took place at the National Indoor Arena in Birmingham, UK, on 9 May 1998.

The Eurovision Song Contest 1998 took place at the National Indoor Arena in Birmingham, United Kingdom on 9 May 1998. According to the Eurovision rules, the 25-country participant list for the contest was composed of: the winning country from the previous year's contest; the 17 countries, other than the previous year's winner, which had obtained the highest average number of points over the last five contests; and any countries which had not participated in the previous year's content. On 13 November 1997, an allocation draw was held which determined the running order and Estonia was set to perform in position 23, following the entry from Norway and before the entry from Turkey. The Estonian conductor at the contest was Heiki Vahar, and Estonia finished in twelfth place with 25 points.

The contest was broadcast in Estonia on ETV with commentary by Reet Linna as well as via radio on Raadio 2 with commentary by Marko Reikop. ETV appointed Mart Sander as its spokesperson to announce the results of the Estonian televote during the show.

=== Voting ===
Below is a breakdown of points awarded to Estonia and awarded by Estonia in the contest. The nation awarded its 12 points to Sweden in the contest.

Points awarded to Estonia
Score	Country
12 points	Finland
10 points	
8 points	Slovakia
7 points	
6 points	
5 points	
4 points	Hungary; Sweden
3 points	
2 points	Netherlands; Slovenia; Spain
1 point	Ireland; Poland

Points awarded by Estonia
Score	Country
12 points	Sweden
10 points	Finland
8 points	United Kingdom
7 points	Israel
6 points	Belgium
5 points	Malta
4 points	Norway
3 points	Croatia
2 points	Ireland
1 point	Germany
