= Guildo hat euch lieb! =

1998 song by Guildo Horn & Die Orthopädischen Strümpfe

Single by Guildo Horn & Die Orthopädischen Strümpfe

from the album Danke!
- Released: 2 March 1998
- Genre: Rock
- Length: 2:58
- Label: Spin; EMI Electrola
- Songwriter(s): Stefan Raab
- Producer(s): Raab; Michael Holm

Eurovision Song Contest 1998 entry
- Country: Germany
- Artist(s): Guildo Horn
- Language: German
- Composer(s): Stefan Raab
- Lyricist(s): Stefan Raab
- Conductor: Stefan Raab

Finals performance
- Final result: 7th
- Final points: 86

Entry chronology
- ◄ "Zeit" (1997)
- "Reise nach Jerusalem – Kudüs'e seyahat" (1999) ►

"Guildo hat euch lieb!" (German pronunciation: [ˈɡɪldoː hat ʔɔʏç ˈliːp]; "Guildo loves you!") was the German entry in the Eurovision Song Contest 1998, performed in German by Guildo Horn & Die Orthopädischen Strümpfe. The song was performed ninth on the night, following Israel's Dana International with "Diva" and preceding Malta's Chiara with "The One That I Love". At the close of voting, it had received 86 points, placing 7th in a field of 25.

== Background ==
Written by television host Stefan Raab under the pseudonym "Alf Igel" (a reference to prolific composer Ralph Siegel), the song is a tongue-in-cheek parody of the schlager style for which Germany had become known at previous contests. Horn (whose backing band's name translates as "the Orthopedic Stockings") sings about his desire to return to "a time of tenderness / when 'Caressing' and 'Cuddling' and 'Loving' / were always written with capitals" and "when [he] daily wrote in a poetry book: / 'Yoo hoo hoo – I love you'".

He promises the objects of his affections – singing in the third person – that if they are ever sad, he will come to their house and sing songs. Later still he expresses a desire to fly away to the stars, before explaining, "if the stars weren't so far away / and from there I'd send you the proof of my love: / nut wedges and raspberry ice cream".

== Eurovision Song Contest ==
The song was performed ninth on the night, following Israel's Dana International with "Diva" and preceding Malta's Chiara with "The One That I Love". At the close of voting, it had received 86 points, placing 7th in a field of 25. The performance was equally tongue-in-cheek, with Horn climbing on the lighting gantries of the stage while dressed in a green velvet shirt, as well as playing a series of cowbells during the song. He also came into the audience, and ruffled the hair of Katie Boyle, former Eurovision hostess and guest of honour. Perhaps unsurprisingly, footage of this performance appeared in a montage of "unforgettable performances" at the Congratulations special in late 2005. The single release also saw a video produced with a similarly irreverent take on things. While the song did not win, it is credited with rekindling German interest in the contest, as well as paving the way for Raab's own entry two years later with "Wadde hadde dudde da?". Following Austria's "Boom Boom Boomerang" and Belgium's "Euro-Vision", it is considered to be the third parody song to make an appearance at the contest.

It was succeeded as German representative at the 1999 contest by Sürpriz with "Reise nach Jerusalem – Kudüs'e seyahat".

== Charts ==
=== Weekly charts ===
Weekly chart performance for "Guildo hat euch lieb!"
Chart (1998)	Peak position
Germany (GfK)	4

=== Year-end charts ===
Year-end chart performance for "Guildo hat euch lieb!"
Chart (1998)	Position
Germany (Official German Charts)	51

Preceded by "Zeit" by Bianca Shomburg	Germany in the Eurovision Song Contest; 1998	Succeeded by "Reise nach Jerusalem – Kudüs'e seyahat" by Sürpriz
