= Neka mi ne svane =

1998 song by Danijela Martinović

Single by Danijela Martinović

from the album To malo ljubavi
- Language: Croatian
- Released: 6 March 1998
- Recorded: 1998
- Studio: Studio Lisinski, Zagreb
- Length: 2:59
- Label: Tonika Records, Orfej
- Songwriters: Petar Grašo, Marina Mudrinić, Vesna Žagar
- Producers: Remi Kazinoti, Stipica Kalogjera

Danijela Martinović singles chronology
"Nemam s kime dočekati zime" (1997)	"Neka mi ne svane" (1998)	"Što sam ja, što si ti" (1998)

Music video
- "Neka mi ne svane" on YouTube

Eurovision Song Contest 1998 entry
- Country: Croatia
- Conductor: Stipica Kalogjera

Finals performance
- Final result: 5th
- Final points: 131

Entry chronology
- ◄ "Probudi me" (1997)
- "Marija Magdalena" (1999) ►

"Neka mi ne svane" is a song by Croatian singer Danijela Martinović, released on 6 March 1998. It was written and composed by Petar Grašo and produced by Remi Kazinoti and Stipica Kalogjera. The song won Dora 1998 and represented Croatia in the Eurovision Song Contest 1998 where it finished in fifth place with 131 points.

== Background and composition ==
"Neka mi ne svane" was written and composed by Petar Grašo and produced by Remi Kazinoti and Stipica Kalogjera. The song was recorded at the beginning of 1998 at Studio Lisinski in Zagreb. It was first performed at Dora 1998 on 6 March 1998 and serviced to Croatian radio stations a day after. Shortly after, the song was released as a CD single with the instrumental and English language versions as b-sides. The English version titled "Despair" had its lyrics written by Marina Mudrinić.

The song is a dramatic ballad, often described as the archetypal "Balkan ballad", with Danijela wishing that she will "cease to exist" rather than live another day without her lover. The song begins quietly, with only Danijela's voice heard, but swells to a climax with backing vocals and light instrumentation.

In 2001, Croatian songwriter Vesna Žagar accused, Petar Grašo, the song's main writer, of plagiarizing her song "K'o mirisni pupoljci". Žagar claimed that Grašo used the melodic lines of "K'o mirisni pupoljci" in "Neka mi ne svane". According to her, Grašo, received an audio cassette with her demo tapes from Žarko Černjul which he later, allegedly, used and incorporated in the chorus of the disputed composition.

== Music video ==
The music video for the song "Neka mi ne svane" was filmed at the Plitvice lakes National Park in 1998 and was directed by Denis Wolfarth. Years later, in 2012, the music video was aploaded to Martinović's official YouTube page where it gathered four million views by June 2023.

== Eurovision Song Contest ==
=== At Dora ===
On 6 March 1998, Dora 1998, the selection show to find Croatia's Eurovision Song Contest 1998 representative was held. In a field of 25 entries, Martinović was 17th to perform her entry. During the voting sequence the song received 165 points from the regional juries with additionally receiving a set of 12 points from the public thus winning the competition.

=== At Eurovision ===
The song represented Croatia in the Eurovision Song Contest 1998, after it was chosen through Dora 1998. Due to the high number of countries wishing to enter the contest a relegation system was introduced in 1993 in order to reduce the number of countries which could compete in each year's contest. Croatia had a high enough average points total to qualify to the final of the 1998 edition held at the Utilita Arena Birmingham on 9 May 1998. It was Martinović's second time representing Croatia as she had previously represented Croatia in 1995 as a member of the group Magazin.

The song was performed first on the night, preceding Greece's Thalassa with "Mia Krifi Evesthisia". At the close of voting, it had received 131 points, placing fifth in a field of 25. The song received the maximum of 12 points from judges from Slovenia and Macedonia. It was succeeded as Croatian representative at the 1999 contest by Doris with "Marija Magdalena".

During the first part of the performance, Martinović was standing dressed in a dark cloak, before the last chorus she undressed revealing the white evening dress that was under the cloak. It's considered one of the most memorable moments in Croatia's history at the Eurovision Song Contest and created the widely used term "dress change".

In a May 2018 poll by Eurofest Hrvatska, the Croatian Eurovision Song Contest fan group, "Neka mi ne svane" was voted the best among 23 Croatian ESC entries to date.

== Track listing ==
CD single

1. "Neka mi ne svane" – 2:59
2. "Despair" (English version) – 2:59
3. "Neka mi ne svane" (Instrumental) – 2:59
4. Dora 1998 footage

== Charts ==
=== Weekly charts ===
Chart performance for "Neka mi ne svane"
Chart (1998)	Peak position
Croatia (HR Top 20)	1

=== Year-end charts ===
Chart performance for "Neka mi ne svane"
Chart (1998)	Peak position
Croatia (HR Top 20)	2
