= Switzerland in the Eurovision Song Contest 1998 =

- Eurovision Song Contest 1998
- Participating broadcaster: Swiss Broadcasting Corporation (SRG SSR)
- Country: Switzerland
- Selection process: Eurosong 98
- Selection date: 18 December 1997

Competing entry
- Song: "Lass ihn"
- Artist: Gunvor
- Songwriters: Gunvor Guggisberg; Egon Egemann

Placement
- Final result: 25th, 0 points

Participation chronology

Switzerland was represented at the Eurovision Song Contest 1998 with the song "Lass ihn", written by Egon Egemann and Gunvor Guggisberg, and performed by Gunvor herself. The Swiss participating broadcaster, the Swiss Broadcasting Corporation (SRG SSR), selected its entry through a national final.

== Background ==
Prior to the 1998 contest, the Swiss Broadcasting Corporation (SRG SSR) had participated in the Eurovision Song Contest representing Switzerland forty-one times since its first entry at the inaugural contest in 1956. It won that first edition of the contest with the song "Refrain" performed by Lys Assia. Its second victory was achieved in 1988 with the song "Ne partez pas sans moi" performed by Canadian singer Céline Dion. In 1997, Switzerland finished 22nd earning 5 points with the song "Dentro di me" performed by Barbara Berta.

Despite regularly using national finals to select their Eurovision entrants (yearly since 1981), SRG SSR selected their entrants through non-televised internal selections from 1994 to 1997 due to the low publicity and high expenses on their national finals. However, SRG SSR continued to hold national finals on a regular basis, starting in this year.

== Before Eurovision ==
=== Eurosong 98 ===
Swiss German and Romansh broadcaster Schweizer Fernsehen der deutschen und rätoromanischen Schweiz (SF DRS) held the national final on 18 December 1997 at 20:00 (CET) at its television studios in Zürich. It hosted by Sandra Studer, who represented Switzerland in 1991. The national final was broadcast on SF 1, TSI 2, and TSR 2 (with commentary from Pierre Grandjean). Katrina and the Waves, who won for the United Kingdom in 1997, and Johnny Logan, who won for Ireland in 1980 and 1987, made guest appearances and performed popular Eurovision songs with Studer.

Six songs participated in the selection, with three songs being performed in French, two in Italian, and one in German. The voting consisted entirely of public voting, with votes being cast from five cities. The winner was the song "Lass ihn", composed by Egon Egemann (who represented Switzerland in 1990) and performed by Gunvor, who also composed the song.

Final – 18 December 1997
R/O	Artist	Song	Songwriter(s)		Language	Points	Place
R/O	Artist	Song	Composer(s)	Lyricist(s)	Language	Points	Place
1	Susan Orús	"L'enfant des étoiles"	Benoît Kaufmann	Rébecca Jonckheere	French	19	3
2	Filippo Trojani	"Amerò di più"	Filippo Trojani		Italian	17	5
3	Anne Francoeur	"Le rêve d'Alice"	Régis Mounir		French	5	6
4	Gunvor	"Lass ihn"	Egon Egemann; Gunvor Guggisberg		German	34	1
5	Talk About Girls	"Qualcosa di te"	Nella Martinetti; Thomas Marin; Berni Staub		Italian	26	2
6	Vanessa Jüdt	"Trouver ma place"	Benoît Kaufmann	Rébecca Jonckheere	French	19	3

Detailed Regional Televoting Results
R/O	Song	Bern	Zürich	Chur	Geneva	Lugano	Total
1	"L'enfant des étoiles"	3	6	4	3	3	19
2	"Amerò di più"	2	3	2	2	8	17
3	"Le rêve d'Alice"	1	1	1	1	1	5
4	"Lass ihn"	8	8	8	6	4	34
5	"Qualcosa di te"	6	4	6	4	6	26
6	"Trouver ma place"	4	2	3	8	2	19

== At Eurovision ==
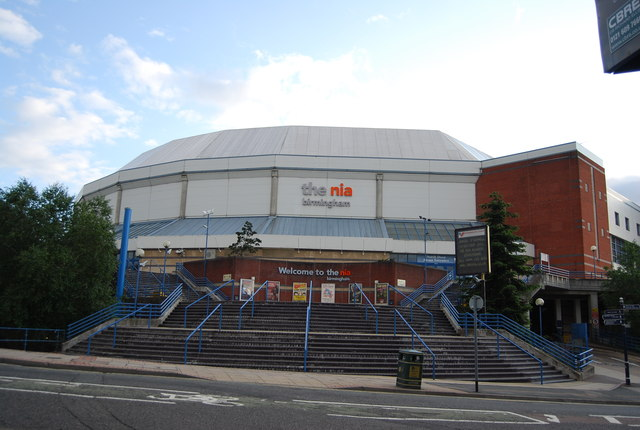
The Eurovision Song Contest 1998 took place at the National Indoor Arena in Birmingham, UK, on 9 May 1998.

According to Eurovision rules, all nations with the exceptions of the eight countries which had obtained the lowest average number of points over the last five contests competed in the final on 9 May 1998. On 13 November 1997, an allocation draw was held which determined the running order and Switzerland was set to perform in position 5, following the entry from Spain and before the entry from Slovakia. Switzerland finished in twenty-fifth (last) place, failing to score any points. This was the fourth time Switzerland finished in last place and the third time the nation received nul points after 1964 and 1967.

In Switzerland, the contest was aired on the three broadcasters that form SRG SSR: Heinz Margot and Roman Kilchsperger provided German commentary on SF 2, Jean-Marc Richard provided French commentary on TSR 1, while Jonathan Tedesco provided Italian commentary on TSI 1. SRG SSR appointed Regula Elsener as its spokesperson to announce the Swiss votes during the show.

=== Voting ===
Below is a breakdown of points awarded to Switzerland and awarded by Switzerland in the contest. The nation awarded its 12 points to Germany in the contest.

==== Points awarded to and by Switzerland ====
Switzerland did not receive any points at the 1998 Eurovision Song Contest.

Points awarded by Switzerland
Score	Country
12 points	Germany
10 points	Israel
8 points	Malta
7 points	Netherlands
6 points	Spain
5 points	Croatia
4 points	Belgium
3 points	United Kingdom
2 points	Ireland
1 point	Norway
