= United Kingdom in the Eurovision Song Contest 1998 =

- Eurovision Song Contest 1998
- Participating broadcaster: British Broadcasting Corporation (BBC)
- Country: United Kingdom
- Selection process: The Great British Song Contest 1998
- Selection date: 15 March 1998

Competing entry
- Song: "Where Are You?"
- Artist: Imaani
- Songwriters: Scott English; Phil Manikiza; Simon Stirling

Placement
- Final result: 2nd, 166 points

Participation chronology

The United Kingdom was represented at the Eurovision Song Contest 1998 with the song "Where Are You?", written by Scott English, Phil Manikiza, and Simon Stirling, and performed by Imaani. In addition, the British Broadcasting Corporation (BBC) was also the host broadcaster and staged the event at the National Indoor Arena in Birmingham on 9 May 1998 after it won the competition in 1997 with the song "Love Shine a Light" performed by Katrina and the Waves. The BBC organised a public selection to select its entry for the contest, The Great British Song Contest 1998. Eight songs competed over two rounds, with four songs selected through a radio-broadcast semi-final advancing to the televised final round, held on 15 March 1998, where viewers selected the winning entry through televoting. Imaani received the most votes and was selected to represent the UK in the contest with the song "Where Are You?". She performed 16th at the international contest, and at the close of the voting process the UK finished in second place with 166 points, the nation's 15th second-place finish since its debut.

== Background ==
Prior to the 1998 contest, the British Broadcasting Corporation (BBC) had participated in the Eurovision Song Contest 40 times since their first entry in 1957 and had competed in all but two editions of the contest. Before this year's event, it had won the contest five times: in 1967 with the song "Puppet on a String" performed by Sandie Shaw, in 1969 with the song "Boom Bang-a-Bang" performed by Lulu, in 1976 with the song "Save Your Kisses for Me" performed by Brotherhood of Man, in 1981 with the song "Making Your Mind Up" performed by Bucks Fizz, and in 1997 with the song "Love Shine a Light" performed by Katrina and the Waves. It had also finished in second place on 14 occasions, more than any other country.

Per the rules of the 1998 contest, as the previous year's winner and contest host, the BBC was given an automatic place in the competition, and was subsequently included on the European Broadcasting Union's (EBU) list of the 25 broadcasters that had signed up to partake in the contest. The BBC opted to select its chosen entry for the contest through a national final entitled The Great British Song Contest 1998.

== Before Eurovision ==
=== The Great British Song Contest 1998 ===
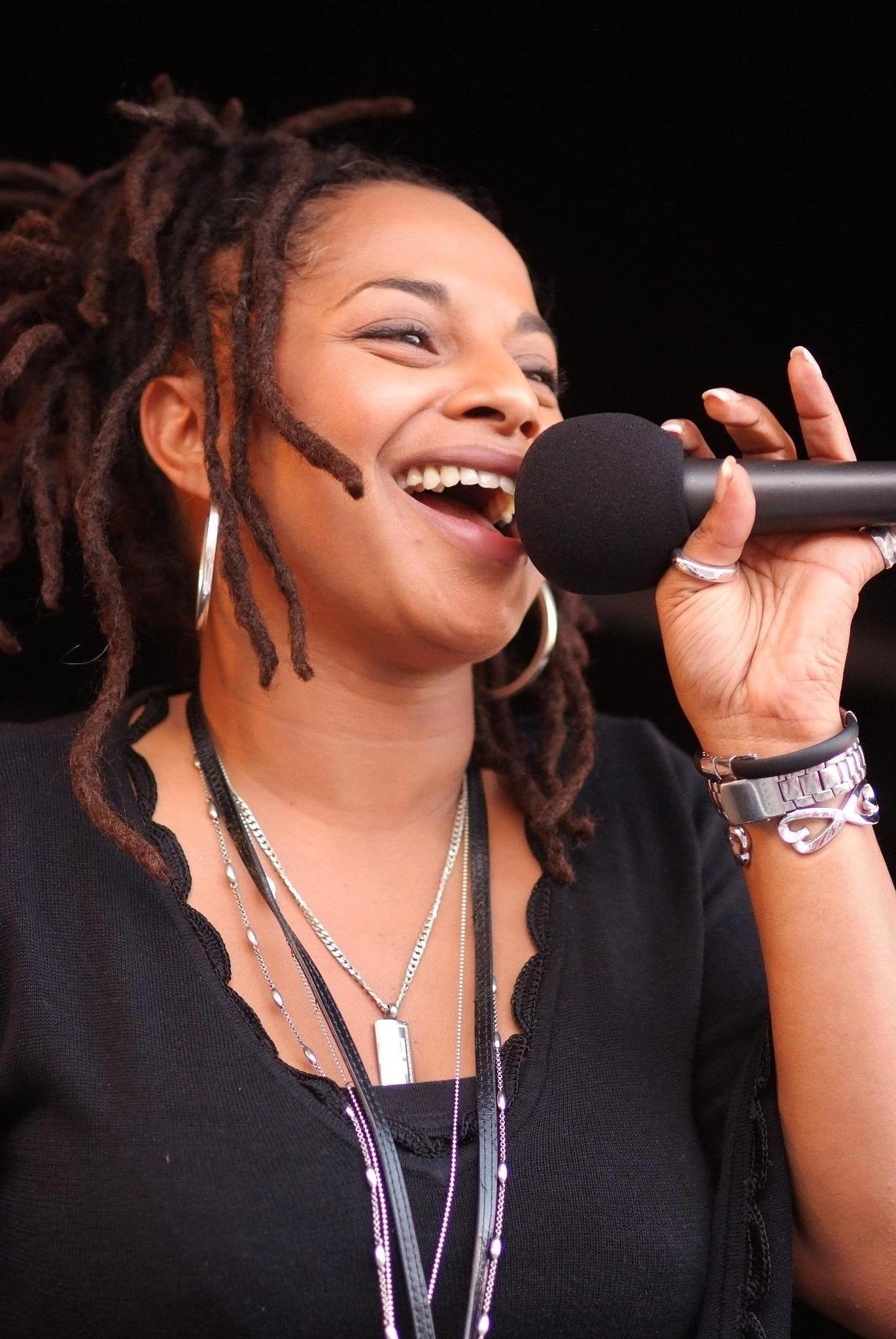
The Great British Song Contest winner Imaani was the first black artist to represent the United Kingdom at Eurovision.

The BBC organised a public selection process to determine its entry for the Eurovision Song Contest 1998. The Great British Song Contest was organised for the third time, following the same format used the previous year: after a public submission process, eight songs were selected to compete in a semi-final broadcast on BBC Radio 2, where listeners would choose four entries via televoting to progress to a final on BBC One. A second round of public voting during the televised broadcast would determine the winning song that would represent the UK at Eurovision. More than 800 songs were submitted to the competition and following several rounds of shortlisting from these songs, the eight semi-finalists were determined.

==== Semi-final ====
The eight songs which featured in the semi-final were previewed on the Radio 2 shows Wake Up to Wogan and The Ken Bruce Show between 2 and 5 February 1998, with two songs being played each day on both programmes. The semi-final was then held on 6 February, hosted by Ken Bruce and Terry Wogan. Once all songs had been played, listeners were invited to phone in and vote for their favourites from 9–10am. The result was announced at the end of the broadcast; the qualifying songs were announced in alphabetical order by title.

Contestants and results of the semi-final – 6 February 1998
R/O	Artist	Song	Songwriter(s)	Result
1	Alberta	"Don't It Make You Feel So Good"	Paul Brown; Mike Connaris	Qualified
2	Lisa Millet	"Give It Up"	Gary Benson; Livingstone Brown; Lisa Millet	—N/a
3	Kitt	"I'll Never Be Lonely Again"	Kate Cameron; Stephen Christopher Jones; Richard Louis Simmonds	Qualified
4	Farrell Lennon	"Suddenly"	Tim Laws; Farrell Lennon; Simon May	—N/a
5	The Collective	"When We're Alone (We Dream)"	Yenka Charles; Debbie Ffrench; Greg Lester; Stephen Rudden; Nick Whitecross; Jay Williams	Qualified
6	Mandy Wilson	"When We Were In Love"	Nicky Graham; Cheryl Parker	—N/a
7	Imaani	"Where Are You?"	Scott English; Phil Manikiza; Simon Stirling	Qualified
8	Anita Madigan	"Wish You Were Here"	Dave King; Anita Madigan; Dave Major	—N/a

==== Final ====
Each of the finalists featured on weekly editions of The National Lottery Draw on BBC One, with one act appearing each week over a period of four weeks: Kitt appeared on the 21 February 1998 broadcast; Alberta on 28 February 1998; Imaani on 7 March 1998; and The Collective on 14 March 1998. A free promotional CD featuring extracts of the four finalists was also released and made available in high street record shops, while the four finalists and the previous year's winning act Katrina Leskanich performed live at London's G-A-Y nightclub on 14 March 1998. Between the semi-final and the final, Kitt changed her stage name to Sapphire.

The final was held on 15 March 1998, broadcast on BBC One and presented by Wogan. The broadcast featured the same performances of the acts as those featured on The National Lottery Draw, with Wogan providing live links between songs and short pre-recorded introductions by the songwriters of each song preceding each performance. Other segments of the broadcast included behind-the-scenes footage featuring Ulrika Jonsson at Birmingham's National Indoor Arena, the venue for the then-upcoming Eurovision Song Contest, an interview with Leskanich hosted by Jonsson and clips during the end credits of previous UK winning Eurovision performances. Following a brief recap of the participating acts, a one-hour voting window was opened for viewers to vote through telephone at a cost of 10p per call and via the internet; the results were subsequently announced by Wogan on 21 March 1998 during that evening's National Lottery Draw on BBC One, with the top three acts announced in reverse order along with the number of votes received. 2.66 million viewers watched the Great British Song Contest final and the National Lottery Draw which featured the results attracted an audience of 9.81 million.

Contestants and results of the final – 15 March 1998
R/O	Artist	Song	Televote	Place
1	The Collective	"When We're Alone (We Dream)"	53,950	4
2	Imaani	"Where Are You?"	70,421	1
3	Alberta	"Don't It Make You Feel So Good"	66,278	2
4	Sapphire	"I'll Never Be Lonely Again"	65,712	3

=== Promotion ===
Ahead of the contest, Imaani made several appearances on UK television programmes to promote her entry to the British public. Imaani performed her Eurovision song on the BBC's children's programmes Blue Peter on 23 March 1998, Live & Kicking on both 28 March 1998 and 11 April 1998, and Fully Booked on 3 May 1998, while she also appeared on the BBC's music chart show Top of the Pops on both 8 and 22 May 1998. BBC Radio 2 also produced a radio documentary, titled Going for a Song, broadcast 9 May 1998, the day of the Eurovision final, which followed Imaani's preparations for the Eurovision Song Contest. "Where Are You?" was released in the formats of both CD and cassette on 9 March 1998, featuring an additional ballad mix of the song. The song peaked at number 15 on the UK Singles Chart, while it also charted on the Netherlands' Mega Top 100 and Belgium's Ultratop chart.

== At Eurovision ==
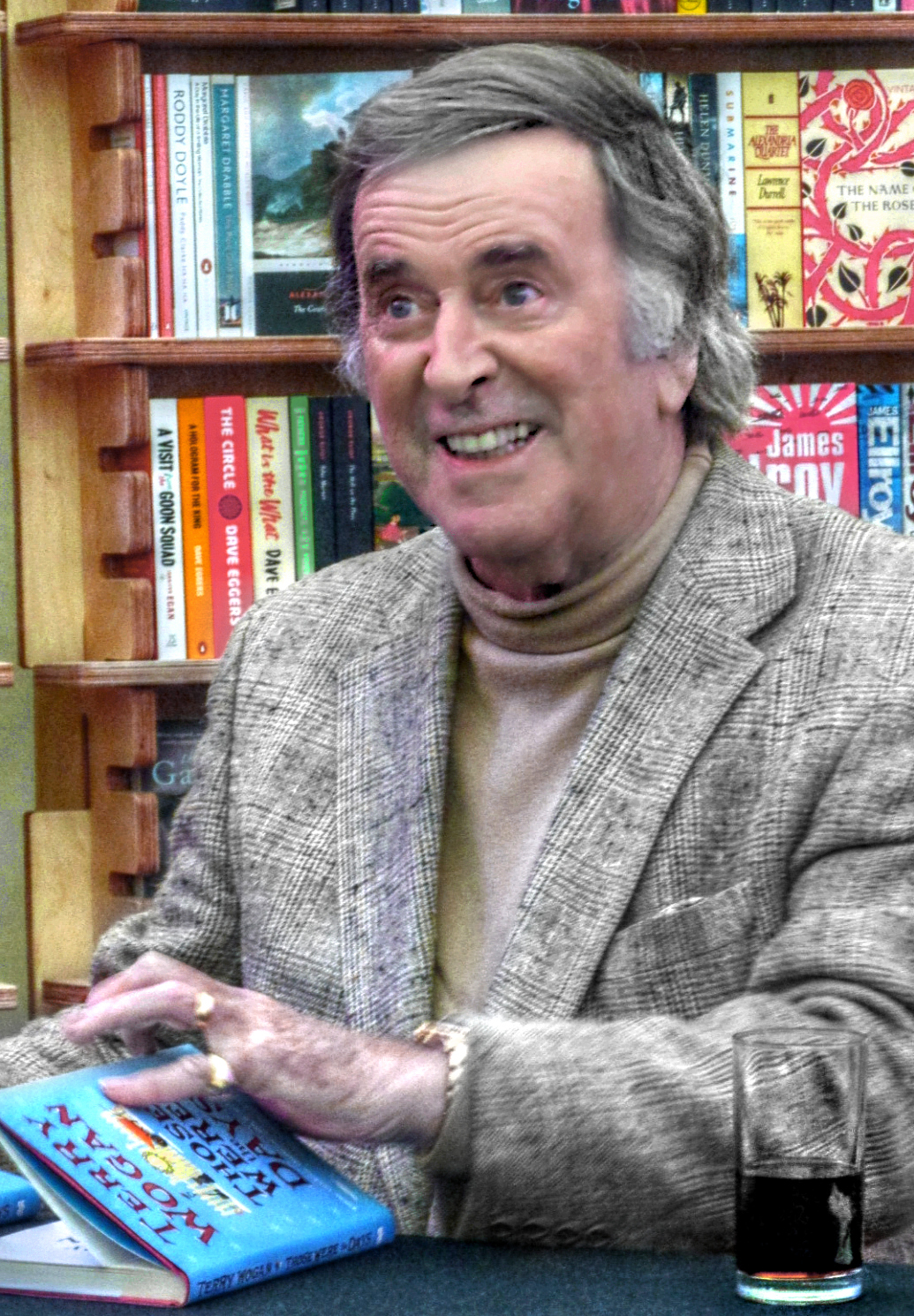
In addition to his role as the BBC commentator, Terry Wogan was also one of the hosts.

As the winners of the previous year's event, the BBC was given the chance to host the Eurovision Song Contest in 1998, selecting the National Indoor Arena in Birmingham as the venue of the contest, held on 9 May 1998. Following confirmation of the 25-country participant list, the running order for the contest was decided by a draw held on 13 November 1997; the UK was assigned position 16, following Romania and preceding Cyprus.

Imaani took part in technical rehearsals at the venue on 5 and 7 May 1998, followed by dress rehearsals on 8 and 9 May. The contest was hosted by Wogan and Jonsson and was broadcast in the UK on television and radio, with Wogan also providing commentary for BBC One and Bruce doing likewise on BBC Radio 2. Imaani performed alongside the BBC Concert Orchestra, which was conducted by James McMillan for her performance.

At the end of the contest, the UK finished in second place, receiving a total of 166 points. The result gave the UK its 15th second-place finish in its competitive history, which remains a contest record as of 2022. The United Kingdom would achieve another second place in 2022.

=== Voting ===
The same voting system in use since 1975 was again implemented for the contest, with each country providing 1–8, 10 and 12 points to their 10 highest-ranking songs, with countries not allowed to vote for themselves. For the first time however, the contest results were determined predominantly by public voting via telephone, following a successful trial among five countries the previous year; an eight-member back-up jury was also assembled in case technical failures rendered the telephone votes invalid.

A total of 407,167 valid votes were registered in the UK in total during the five-minute voting window, which determined the UK's points; the BBC subsequently published a full breakdown of the votes cast for each country after the Eurovision Song Contest. Bruce was also appointed the spokesperson and announced the results of the UK vote during the broadcast.

Points awarded to the United Kingdom
Score	Country
12 points	Croatia; Israel; Romania; Turkey
10 points	Hungary; Macedonia
8 points	Cyprus; Estonia; Finland; Malta
7 points	Greece; Netherlands; Poland; Sweden
6 points	Belgium; Portugal
5 points	Ireland; Norway; Slovenia
4 points	
3 points	France; Spain (Note: During the contest, Spain had originally awarded the United Kingdom four points; however it was later revealed that Spain had miscalculated the televotes received and that Germany, who had originally received no points, should have received 12 as their favourite act. As a consequence the Spanish results were modified after the contest, with the points given to all other countries being reduced.); Switzerland
2 points	
1 point	Germany; Slovakia

Points awarded by the United Kingdom
Score	Country
12 points	Malta
10 points	Netherlands
8 points	Ireland
7 points	Belgium
6 points	Germany
5 points	Israel
4 points	Norway
3 points	Cyprus
2 points	Croatia
1 point	Sweden

Detailed televoting results from the United Kingdom
Draw	Country	Televotes	Rank	Points
01	Croatia	15,805	9	2
02	Greece	4,913	15	
03	France	3,477	19	
04	Spain	4,684	16	
05	Switzerland	3,209	20	
06	Slovakia	3,201	21	
07	Poland	9,625	11	
08	Israel	32,995	6	5
09	Germany	34,321	5	6
10	Malta	69,000	1	12
11	Hungary	2,975	22	
12	Slovenia	4,267	17	
13	Ireland	43,280	3	8
14	Portugal	7,140	13	
15	Romania	2,762	23	
16	United Kingdom			
17	Cyprus	16,422	8	3
18	Netherlands	54,394	2	10
19	Sweden	12,177	10	1
20	Belgium	38,395	4	7
21	Finland	3,617	18	
22	Norway	23,320	7	4
23	Estonia	7,689	12	
24	Turkey	6,052	14	
25	Macedonia	2,447	24	
