= Belgium in the Eurovision Song Contest 1998 =

- Eurovision Song Contest 1998
- Participating broadcaster: Radio-télévision belge de la Communauté française (RTBF)
- Country: Belgium
- Selection process: Finale Nationale Concours Eurovision de la Chanson 1998
- Selection date: 13 March 1998

Competing entry
- Song: "Dis oui"
- Artist: Mélanie Cohl
- Songwriter: Philippe Swan

Placement
- Final result: 6th, 122 points

Participation chronology

Belgium was represented at the Eurovision Song Contest 1998 with the song "Dis oui", written by Philippe Swan, and performed by Mélanie Cohl. The Belgian participating broadcaster, Walloon Radio-télévision belge de la Communauté française (RTBF), selected its entry through a national final. The entry placed sixth out of the 25 entries, scoring 122 points.

== Background ==
Prior to the 1998 contest, Belgium had participated in the Eurovision Song Contest forty times since its debut as one of seven countries to take part in 1956.Since then, they have won the contest on one occasion in 1986 with the song "J'aime la vie", performed by Sandra Kim. In 1996, the latest Belgian entry, "Liefde is een kaartspel" by Lisa del Bo placed sixteenth.

The Belgian participation in the contest alternates between two broadcasters: Flemish Vlaamse Radio- en Televisieomroeporganisatie (VRT) and Walloon Radio-télévision belge de la Communauté française (RTBF) at the time, with both broadcasters sharing the broadcasting rights. Both broadcasters –and their predecessors– had selected the Belgian entry using national finals and internal selections in the past. RTBF had the turn to participate in 1998. The broadcaster returned to the contest after a two-year absence following Belgium's relegation from 1997 as one of the six countries with the least average points over the preceding four contests. RTBF selected its entry for the 1998 contest through the national final Finale Nationale Concours Eurovision de la Chanson 1998.

== Before Eurovision ==
=== Finale Nationale Concours Eurovision de la Chanson 1998 ===
Finale Nationale Concours Eurovision de la Chanson 1998 was the national final organised by RTBF to select its entry in the Eurovision Song Contest 1998. 128 entries were received for the competition following a submission period, from which ten acts were selected by a committee chaired by Head of the RTBF variety and entertainment department Pierre Meyer and announced on 12 December 1997. The national final was broadcast live at 20:20 (CET) on 13 March 1998 on La Une from Studio 6 in the RTBF Studios in Brussels and was hosted by Jean-Pierre Hautier. The winner, "Dis oui" performed by Mélanie Cohl, was selected solely by public televoting with the results being revealed by Belgium's six regions: four provinces in Wallonia with votes from Namur and Luxembourg being combined, a "Rest of Belgium" region made up of votes from Flanders, and Brussels.

Final – 13 March 1998
R/O	Artist	Song	Songwriter(s)	Televote	Place
1	Alexis	"Rien qu'une passagère"	Jacques Broun, Alexis Vanderheyden	2,661	5
2	Betty	"Ferme la porte à tes larmes"	Pierre Theunis	1,761	7
3	Valérie Buggea	"Dans quel monde"	Daniel Willem, Joseph Reynaerts, Damir Ceric	1,131	10
4	Curt Close	"Ton image"	Curt Close	2,503	6
5	Mélanie Cohl	"Dis oui"	Philippe Swan	15,424	1
6	Alain Colard and Sabrine	"Pour t'entendre encore"	Alain Colard	2,700	4
7	Maira	"Ma séduction"	Christian Vidal, Wota, M. Pools	1,217	9
8	Les Mas	"Ils sont là"	Asukulu Yunu Mukalay	11,021	2
9	Dida Robbert	"Tant besoin de toi"	Luc Mourinet	1,227	8
10	Manon Selyn	"Tu es libre"	Martine Cugnon, Adelin Deltenre	4,831	3

Detailed Regional Televoting Results
R/O	Song	Walloon Brabant	Hainaut	Namur and Luxembourg	Liège	Rest of Belgium	Brussels	Total
1	"Rien qu'une passagère"	53	147	159	2,008	112	182	2,661
2	"Ferme la porte à tes larmes"	75	434	216	650	121	265	1,761
3	"Dans quel monde"	103	128	80	459	151	210	1,131
4	"Ton image"	159	378	229	704	450	583	2,503
5	"Dis oui"	1,002	5,281	1,690	2,228	2,565	2,658	15,424
6	"Pour t'entendre encore"	229	546	375	434	290	756	2,700
7	"Ma séduction"	69	219	147	404	174	204	1,217
8	"Ils sont là"	942	3,851	1,211	1,443	1,303	2,271	11,021
9	"Tant besoin de toi"	79	217	129	152	190	460	1,227
10	"Tu es libre"	326	896	1,054	727	540	1,288	4,831

== At Eurovision ==
According to Eurovision rules, all nations with the exceptions of the eight countries which had obtained the lowest average number of points over the last five contests competed in the final on 9 May 1998. On 13 November 1997, an allocation draw was held which determined the running order and Belgium was set to perform in position 20, following the entry from Sweden and before the entry from Finland. Belgium finished in sixth place with 122 points.

The contest was broadcast in Belgium by both the Walloon and Flemish broadcasters. RTBF televised the show on La Une with commentary in French by Jean-Pierre Hautier. VRT broadcast the show on TV1 and Radio 2 with commentary in Dutch by André Vermeulen and Andrea Croonenberghs. RTBF appointed Marie-Hélène Vanderborght as its spokesperson to announce the results of the Belgian televote during the final.

=== Voting ===
Below is a breakdown of points awarded to Belgium and awarded by Belgium in the contest. The nation awarded its 12 points in the contest to the Netherlands.

Points awarded to Belgium
Score	Country
12 points	Poland
10 points	Netherlands
8 points	Portugal
7 points	France; Ireland; Norway; Slovakia; Spain; United Kingdom
6 points	Cyprus; Estonia; Macedonia; Slovenia
5 points	Israel
4 points	Germany; Greece; Switzerland
3 points	Hungary; Malta
2 points	Sweden
1 point	Turkey

Points awarded by Belgium
Score	Country
12 points	Netherlands
10 points	Israel
8 points	Malta
7 points	Germany
6 points	United Kingdom
5 points	Croatia
4 points	Norway
3 points	Spain
2 points	Cyprus
1 point	Portugal
