= Philippe Swan =

Belgian singer-songwriter (born 1961)

- Origin: Belgium
- Genre: Pop
- Occupations: Singer, songwriter
- Years active: 1988–present

Philippe Swan (born Philippe Colpaert) is a Belgian singer-songwriter. He had a hit in 1989 with "Dans ma rue".

He is now practising painting under the artist name Le Closier, in a style close to pop art and urban art. He lives and works in the United States.

== Biography ==
After his studies in Solvay, he worked in a Belgian record company. Then he wrote a few songs, including "J'ai joué, j'ai perdu", "Suzy", "Policy of Love", "Je plane", "Machinalement" and "Rien faire sauf l'amour". "Dans ma rue" was released in France in 1989 and reached No. 36 on the French SNEP Singles Chart. However, he preferred to write and compose for other artists, released a few albums under his own name, then became a producer. His most notable client was Mélanie Cohl, who performed a song from the soundtrack of the Walt Disney movie Mulan. He also wrote "Dis oui", the song she entered in the Eurovision Song Contest 1998, as well as lyrics for Günther Neefs (2000), Priscilla (2002), Lutin Plop, and Fred & Samson (2007).
