= Janika Sillamaa =

Estonian singer and actress (born 1975)

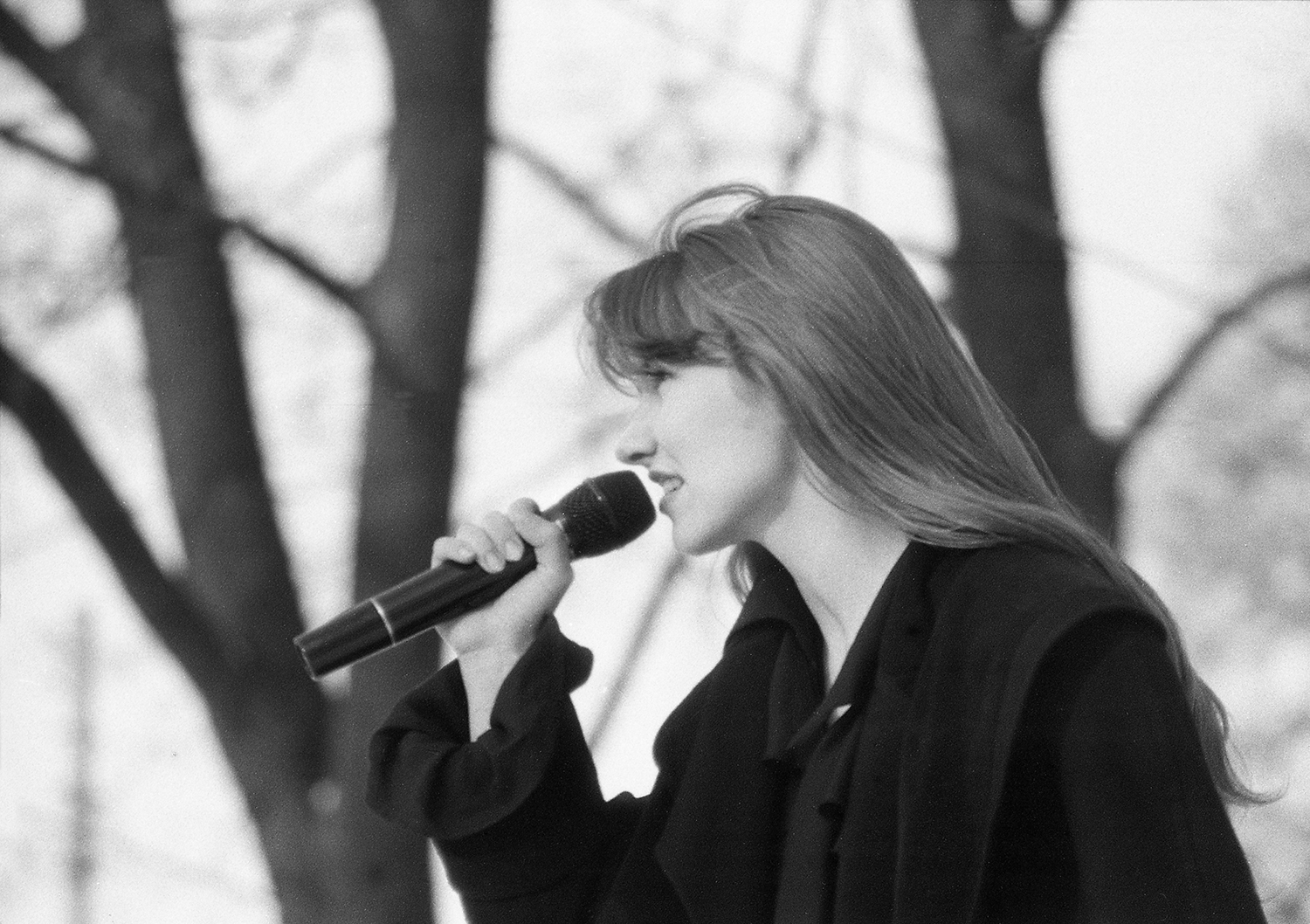
- Janika Sillamaa, on the beach of Pärnu 1994

Background information
- Born: 23 June 1975 (age 51); Tallinn, then part of Estonian SSR, Soviet Union
- Genres: Theatre, pop, jazz
- Occupations: Singer, actress
- Instrument: Vocals
- Years active: 1993–present

Janika Sillamaa (born 23 June 1975) is an Estonian singer and actress.

Born into a musical family, Sillamaa was herself onstage from a very young age: in the musical theatre Colombina, founded by her mother Kaari Sillamaa, she played lead roles in many children's musicals, including "Thumbelina" and a revue programme "Mini-Cabaret".

In 1993 Sillamaa performed at the Roskilde Festival. She was then a student in the pop-jazz department of the Georg Ots Music School in Tallinn, where her vocal-coaches were Jaak Joala and Kare Kauks. In 1992 Sillamaa was internally chosen to represent Estonia at Eurovision 1993 - Estonia's first Eurovision participation - with Sillamaa performing eight potential entrant songs in a national preliminary round televised live as Eurolaul 1993 on 20 February 1993. The song selected for Sillamaa to perform as the Estonian Eurovision entrant was "Muretut meelt ja südametuld". With representatives of six other former Eastern bloc nations and nations of former Yugoslavia, Sillamaa performed "Muretut meelt ja südametuld" at the Kvalifikacija za Millstreet semi-final round broadcast live on 3 April 1993 in Ljubljana, when four of the seven competing entrants were eliminated, including "Muretut meelt ja südametuld" which finished the round at #5.

In 1992 Sillamaa played her first adult role in a stage musical: Mary Magdalene Jesus Christ Superstar at the Linnahall. Having recorded a few singles as vocalist for rock group the Names from 1995, Sillamaa again participated in Eurolaul in 1998 bidding to represent Estonia at Eurovision with "Viimne valge kuu" a song composed by Sillamaa's mother Kaari which finished Eurolaul 1998 in fourth place. In 2000 Sillamaa commenced studies at the Higher Drama School of Estonia intending to complete a four-year programme in stage directing. Only a matter of months before her graduation, however, a red card was shown for delicate reasons, possibly. Neither of the sides, nor the commission or the drop-out herself have yet agreed to reveal on the matter. Despite the controversy over the diploma she was never awarded, Sillamaa has since directed stage plays on a regular basis.

The 2000s (decade) also mark another turn to Janika Sillamaa's career. Several lead roles of blockbuster musicals have come on her credit, such as Elton John's "Aida" (title role), Ulvaeus-Andersson's "Chess" (Svetlana), Schönberg-Boublil's "Miss Saigon" (Ellen) and Webber's "Cats" to name a few. In 2009, she formed a rock band, Famagusta, with friends and recorded a single, Rong, which she described as an anthem for women in their 30s.

Janika Sillamaa has settled in Tallinn with her partner, Villu Feldberg, and their daughter, Alma (b. 2015).
