= Slovakia in the Eurovision Song Contest 1998 =

- Eurovision Song Contest 1998
- Participating broadcaster: Slovenská televízia (STV)
- Country: Slovakia
- Selection process: Artist: Bratislavská lýra 97; Song: Internal selection
- Selection date: Artist: 7 June 1997; Song: 9 March 1998

Competing entry
- Song: "Modlitba"
- Artist: Katarína Hasprová
- Songwriters: Gabriel Dušík; Anna Wepperyová

Placement
- Final result: 21st, 8 points

Participation chronology

Slovakia was represented at the Eurovision Song Contest 1998 with the song "Modlitba", composed by Gabriel Dušík, with lyrics by Anna Wepperyová, and performed by Katarína Hasprová. The Slovak participating broadcaster, Slovenská televízia (STV), selected its performer for the contest through Bratislavská lýra '97 and, subsequently, the song internally once the national final was over. The competition was held on 7 June 1997 where Katarína Hasprová eventually emerged as the winner. The song Hasprová performed at the contest, "Modlitba", was released on 9 March.

Slovakia competed in the Eurovision Song Contest which took place on 9 May 1998. Performing during the show in position 6, Slovakia placed 21st out of the 25 participating countries, scoring 8 points.

== Background ==
Prior to the 1998 contest, Slovenská televízia (STV) had participated in the Eurovision Song Contest representing Slovakia two times since its first entry in 1994. It missed the 1993 contest when its selected song, "Amnestia na neveru" performed by the band Elán, failed to make it through the special qualifying round Kvalifikacija za Millstreet. To this point, its best placing was 18th, achieved in 1996 with the song "Kym nas mas" performed by Marcel Palonder. Its least successful result was in 1994 when it placed 19th with the song "Nekonecna piesen" by Martin Durinda and Tublatanka.

As part of its duties as participating broadcaster, STV organises the selection of its entry in the Eurovision Song Contest and broadcasts the event in the country. Since its debut at the contest, the broadcaster has used internal selections to select its entry in the past. However, in 1998, it opted to stage a national final for the first time in its competitive history in order to select artist that would represent Slovakia.

== Before Eurovision ==
=== Bratislavská lýra '97 ===
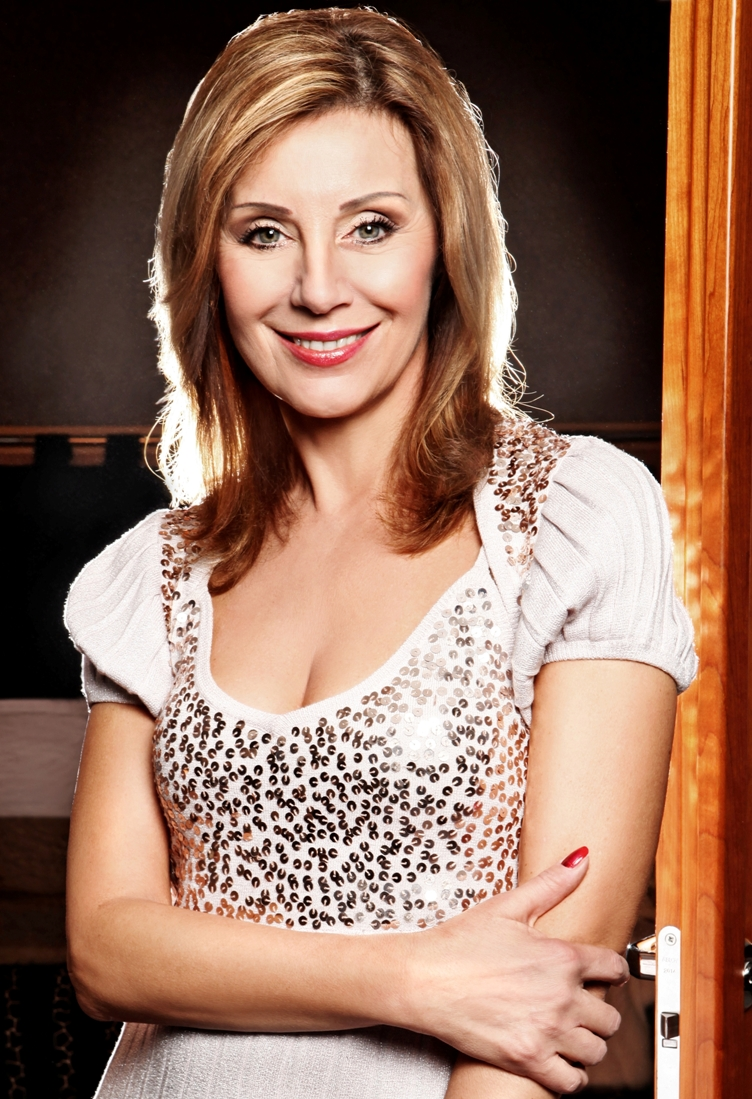
Alena Heribanová (pictured in 2009) hosted Bratislavská lýra '97

STV used the international festival Bratislavská lýra '97 to select its performer for the Eurovision Song Contest 1998. The final was held on 7 June 1997 at House of Culture Istropolis in Bratislava, hosted by Alena Heribanová and broadcast on STV1. All competing songs were accompanied by an orchestra, conducted by Vlado Valovič. 14 songs performed by artists from nine countries competed during the show, and "Jedno zbohom" performed by Katarína Hasprová was selected as the winner by a 10-member international jury panel headed by editor-in-chief of the STV entertainment and music editorial board Martin Sarvaš. By winning the competition, Hasprová gained the right to represent the country at the Eurovision Song Contest 1998, and was also awarded a monetary prize of US$5,000. In addition to the performances of the competing entries, Berco Balogh and Lucie Bílá Boom Band performed as guests.

| R/O | Country | Artist | Song | Place |
|---|---|---|---|---|
| 1 | Slovakia | Cross the Roads | "Súkromné požiare" | —N/a |
| 2 | Hungary | Péter Gerendás | "Elkésett karnevál" | —N/a |
| 3 | Slovakia | Trend | "Som hádankou" | —N/a |
| 4 | Czech Republic | Rebecca | "Do nikam" | —N/a |
| 5 | Poland | Zbigniew Gniewaszewski | "Ten moj Nowy Jork" | —N/a |
| 6 | Croatia | Branka Bliznac | "Zašto?" | —N/a |
| 7 | Slovakia | Brigita Szelidová | "Modlitba za mamu" | —N/a |
| 8 | Germany | Jill Scherer | "Aber Morgen" | —N/a |
| 9 | Slovakia | Braňo Černák | "Za riekou" | —N/a |
| 10 | Slovakia | No Name | "Môj kámoš" | —N/a |
| 11 | Malta | Catherine Vigar | "The Call" | 2 |
| 12 | Netherlands | Marleen | "Zij" | 3 |
| 13 | Slovakia | Katarína Hasprová | "Jedno zbohom" | 1 |
| 14 | Austria | Ruediger | "Desiree" | —N/a |

=== Song selection ===
On 9 March 1998, STV announced that Katarína Hasprová would perform the song "Modlitba" at the Eurovision Song Contest 1998. "Modlitba" was written by Gabriel Dušík and Anna Wepperyová.

== At Eurovision ==
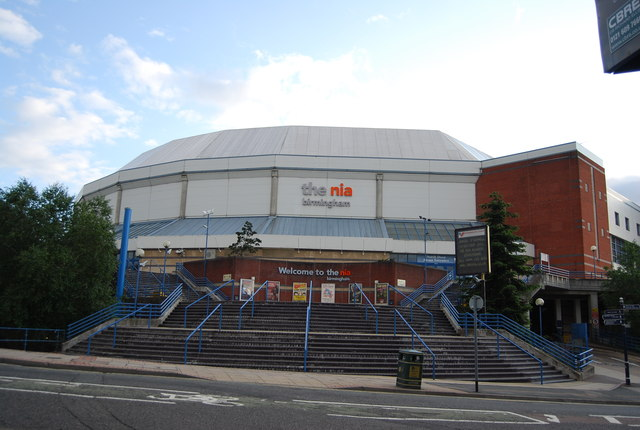
The Eurovision Song Contest 1998 took place at the National Indoor Arena in Birmingham, UK, on 9 May 1998.

The Eurovision Song Contest 1998 took place at the National Indoor Arena in Birmingham, UK, on 9 May 1998. According to the Eurovision rules, the twenty-five participants were made up of the previous year's winning country and host nation UK, the eighteen countries which had the highest average points total over the preceding five contests, and any eligible countries which did not compete in the 1997 contest. Slovakia was one of the eligible countries which did not compete in the 1997 contest, and thus were permitted to participate. The running order for the contest was decided by a draw held on 13 November 1997. Slovakia was assigned to perform 6th at the 1998 Contest, following Switzerland and preceding Poland.

After the voting concluded, Slovakia scored 8 points, all from Croatia, and placed 21st in a field of 25. At the time, this result was Slovakia's worst placing in its competitive history, and was the nation's first finish outside of the top 20. The Slovak conductor at the contest was Vladimír Valovič.

Due to a poor average score, Slovakia was excluded from the Eurovision Song Contest 1999 and was therefore not eligible to participate until 2000. However, after being due to return in 2000, STV withdrew due to financial concerns. Slovakia ultimately did not return to the contest until 2009.

=== Voting ===
The same voting system in use since 1975 was again implemented for 1998 contest, with each country providing 1–8, 10 and 12 points to the ten highest-ranking songs as determined by a selected jury or the viewing public through televoting, with countries not allowed to vote for themselves. Slovakia opted to use public televoting to determine which countries would receive their points. STV appointed Alena Heribanová as its spokesperson to announce the points awarded by the Slovak public during the show.

Points awarded to Slovakia
| Score | Country |
|---|---|
| 12 points | |
| 10 points | |
| 8 points | Croatia |
| 7 points | |
| 6 points | |
| 5 points | |
| 4 points | |
| 3 points | |
| 2 points | |
| 1 point | |

Points awarded by Slovakia
| Score | Country |
|---|---|
| 12 points | Malta |
| 10 points | Croatia |
| 8 points | Estonia |
| 7 points | Belgium |
| 6 points | Netherlands |
| 5 points | Cyprus |
| 4 points | Ireland |
| 3 points | Macedonia |
| 2 points | Portugal |
| 1 point | United Kingdom |
