= Croatia in the Eurovision Song Contest 1998 =

- Eurovision Song Contest 1998
- Participating broadcaster: Croatian Radiotelevision (HRT)
- Country: Croatia
- Selection process: Dora 1998
- Selection date: 6 March 1998

Competing entry
- Song: "Neka mi ne svane"
- Artist: Danijela Martinović
- Songwriters: Petar Grašo; Stjepan Kalogjera; Remi Kazinoti

Placement
- Final result: 5th, 131 points

Participation chronology

Croatia was represented at the Eurovision Song Contest 1998 with the song "Neka mi ne svane", written by Petar Grašo, Stjepan Kalogjera, and Remi Kazinoti, and performed by Danijela Martinović. The Croatian participating broadcaster, Croatian Radiotelevision (HRT), selected its entry through Dora 1998.

== Before Eurovision ==
=== Dora 1998 ===
Croatian Radiotelevision (HRT) held the national final on 6 March 1998 at the Crystall Ballroom of the Hotel Kvarner in Opatija, hosted by Daniela Trbović and Ljudevit Grgurić Grga. Twenty songs competed in the national final, accompanied by the big orchestra of HRT. The winning song was chosen primarily by jury voting, with 20 juries – one from each of the 20 Croatian counties – plus the votes of the televoting public – given the same weight as one jury – determining the winner.

Final – 6 March 1998
R/O	Artist	Song	Songwriter(s)	Points	Place
1	Valentina Brzović	"Sve što si ti"	Valentina Brzović	2	17
2	Zorica Kondža	"Nebo"	Alida Šarar, Davor Tolja	78	7
3	Ready Cool	"Život iza ponoći"	Marin Limić	32	15
4	Stijene	"Još te volim kao nekada"	Marin Limić	70	8
5	Ena	"Stara zvone jedne ljubavi"	Nenad Ninčević	0	18
6	Melani	"Ja ću po svom, ti ćeš po svom"	Fayo, Franjo Valentić	10	16
7	Tina and Nikša	"Ako me ikad poželiš"	Nikša Jurinović	48	13
8	Branimir Mihaljević	"Daj daj"	Branimir Mihaljević	132	3
9	Colonia	"U ritmu ljubavi"	Boris Đurđević	87	4
10	Magazin	"Na svijetu sve"	Vjekoslava Huljić, Tonči Huljić	79	6
11	Ivan Mikulić	"Pjesma putuje"	Zrinko Tutić	61	11
12	Marsell Benzon	"Sve je za tebe"	Marina Valković, Slobodan Vujović	52	12
13	Alen Nižetić	"Bez ljubavi"	Nenad Ninčević, Alen Nižetić	63	10
14	Andrea Čubrić	"Samo ti je ljubav potrebna"	Alida Šarar, Davor Tolja	42	14
15	Sanja Trumbić	"Da bar vječno živimo"	Zeljko Krušlin	0	18
16	Lana Cenčić	"Ljubi me i to je to"	Sanja Mudrinić, Fayo, Miro Buljan	0	18
17	Danijela	"Neka mi ne svane"	Petar Grašo, Stjepan Kalogjera, Remi Kazinoti	177	1
18	Zrinka and Goran	"Bolero"	Vjekoslava Huljić, Zdenko Runjić	133	2
19	Novi fosili	"Pričaj mi o ljubavi"	Stevo Cvikić, Rajko Dujmić	69	9
20	Azzurro and Nikad dosta	"Ruku na srce"	Zlatan Stipišić Gibonni	83	5

Detailed Voting Results
R/O	Song	Bjelovar	Čakovec	Dubrovnik	Gospić	Karlovac	Koprivnica	Krapina	Osijek	Pazin	Požega	Rijeka	Sisak	Slavonski Brod	Split	Šibenik	Varaždin	Vinkovci	Vukovar	Zadar	Zagreb	Televote	Total
1	"Sve što si ti"																					2	2
2	"Nebo"	7	1			5	7	6	6			10	12	1	7		3	5	7	1			78
3	"Život iza ponoći"			8										8	4				5		2	5	32
4	"Još te volim kao nekada"	3	7	1	3	1	3	7		3		6	7	7	6	5		1		3	7		70
5	"Stara zvone jedne ljubavi"																						0
6	"Ja ću po svom, ti ćeš po svom"		5								1						1				3		10
7	"Ako me ikad poželiš"			6	12			1		7	5			5		2					10		48
8	"Daj daj"	5		12		4	8	8	12	8	10	12	4				7	8	8	7	12	7	132
9	"U ritmu ljubavi"					6			10		12	4	8	10	5	10			12		6	4	87
10	"Na svijetu sve"	1	8	4	5	10		3	1	5			10		3	3	5	2	4	4	5	6	79
11	"Pjesma putuje"	4		10	2	2	4	2		10			1	4	1	7		4				10	61
12	"Sve je za tebe"	12	2				5		4	1		1	6	3				6		8	4		52
13	"Bez ljubavi"	8		2	1		6		2	2	4			6		8	4	12	3	5			63
14	"Samo ti je ljubav potrebna"		3		6						8	7			2	4	2		2		8		42
15	"Da bar vječno živimo"																						0
16	"Ljubi me i to je to"																						0
17	"Neka mi ne svane"	10	12	7	4	12	12	12	8	6	6	8	3	12	8	6	10	7	10	12		12	177
18	"Bolero"	2	4	5	7	8	10	4	5	12	3	3	5		12	12	6	10	6	10	1	8	133
19	"Pričaj mi o ljubavi"		10	3	8	3	1	5	3	4	7	5		2			12		1	2		3	69
20	"Ruku na srce"	6	6		10	7	2	10	7		2	2	2		10	1	8	3		6		1	83

== At Eurovision ==
Danijela performed 1st in the running order on the night of the contest, preceding Greece. At the close of voting "Neka mi ne svane" received 131 points, placing Croatia 5th out of 25 competing countries. The Croatian televoting awarded its 12 points to the United Kingdom.

=== Voting ===
Points awarded to Croatia
Score	Country
12 points	Macedonia; Slovenia
10 points	Germany; Israel; Malta; Slovakia
8 points	France
7 points	Cyprus
6 points	Norway; Poland
5 points	Belgium; Greece; Switzerland
4 points	Netherlands; Turkey
3 points	Estonia; Finland; Ireland; Sweden
2 points	Portugal; United Kingdom
1 point	Spain

Points awarded by Croatia
Score	Country
12 points	United Kingdom
10 points	Netherlands
8 points	Slovakia
7 points	Malta
6 points	Macedonia
5 points	Turkey
4 points	Cyprus
3 points	Slovenia
2 points	Ireland
1 point	Spain
