= Portugal in the Eurovision Song Contest 1998 =

- Eurovision Song Contest 1998
- Participating broadcaster: Radiotelevisão Portuguesa (RTP)
- Country: Portugal
- Selection process: Festival RTP da Canção 1998
- Selection date: 7 March 1998

Competing entry
- Song: "Se eu te pudesse abracar"
- Artist: Alma Lusa
- Songwriter: José Cid

Placement
- Final result: 12th, 36 points

Participation chronology

Portugal was represented at the Eurovision Song Contest 1998 with the song "Se eu te pudesse abraçar" written by José Cid, and performed by the group Alma Lusa. The Portuguese participating broadcaster, Radiotelevisão Portuguesa (RTP), organised the national final Festival RTP da Canção 1998 in order to select its entry for the contest. The competition took place on 7 March 1998 where "Se eu te pudesse abraçar" performed by Alma Lusa emerged as the winner following the votes from a five-member jury panel. Songwriter José Cid represented Portugal in the Eurovision Song Contest 1980 with the song "Um grande, grande amor" which placed seventh in the competition.

The song competed in the Eurovision Song Contest which took place on 9 May 1998. Performing during the show in position 14, it placed twelfth out of the 25 participating songs from different countries, scoring 36 points.

== Background ==
Prior to the 1998 contest, Radiotelevisão Portuguesa (RTP) had participated in the Eurovision Song Contest representing Portugal thirty-three times since its first entry in 1964. Its highest placing in the contest was sixth, achieved in 1996 with the song "O meu coração não tem cor" performed by Lúcia Moniz. Its least successful result has been last place, which it has achieved on three occasions, most recently in 1997 with the song "Antes do adeus" performed by Célia Lawson. The Portuguese entry has also received nul points on two occasions; in 1964 and 1997.

RTP has traditionally selected its entry for the Eurovision Song Contest via the music competition Festival da Canção, with an exception in 1988 when it selected its entry internally. The broadcaster organized Festival RTP da Canção 1998 in order to select the 1998 Portuguese entry.

== Before Eurovision ==
=== Festival RTP da Canção 1998 ===
Festival RTP da Canção 1998 was the 35th edition of Festival da Canção that selected the Portuguese entry for the Eurovision Song Contest 1998. Eight entries, selected from 29 submissions received through the Portuguese Phonographic Association, the Independent Phonographic Association and individual composers invited by RTP, competed in the competition which took place at the Teatro São Luiz in Lisbon on 7 March 1998, hosted by Carlos Ribeiro and former Eurovision Song Contest entrant Lúcia Moniz, who represented Portugal in the 1996 contest, and broadcast on RTP1 and RTP Internacional. The winner, "Se eu te pudesse abraçar" performed by Alma Lusa, was selected based on the votes of a jury panel. The jury that voted consisted of Maria do Rosário Domingues, João Filipe Barbosa, Nuno Galopim, Paulo de Carvalho and Sara Tavares. In addition to the performances of the competing entries, among the artists which performed as the interval act included Portuguese Eurovision 1985 entrant Adelaide Ferreira and Portuguese Eurovision 1993 entrant Anabela.

Alma Lusa were a short-lived Portuguese musical group, set up specifically to participate in Festival da Canção 1998. The group consisted of vocalist Inês Santos and musicians José Cid, Carlos Jesus, Henrique Lopes, Carlos Ferreirinha and Pedro Soares; Cid represented Portugal in the Eurovision Song Contest 1980.

Final – 7 March 1998
R/O	Artist	Song	Songwriter(s)	Points	Place
1	Sofia Barbosa	"Uma lua em cada mão"	José Fanha, Jorge Quintela	29	3
2	Carlos Evora	"Saudade que eu sou"	José Fanha, João Balucio	25	5
3	Teresa Radamanto	"Só o mar ficou"	Nuno Gomes dos Santos, João Mota Oliveira	32	2
4	Ana Isabel	"O encanto da sereia"	José Fanha, Eduaro Paes Mamede	27	4
5	Ana Ritta	"Basta só um olhar"	Carlos Soares, José Orlando	8	7
6	Janot	"Aqui ou além"	Pedro Malaquias, Janot, Carlos Maria de Carvalho	7	8
7	Axel	"Só à tua espera"	Carlos Soares, Jorge do Carmo, Fernando Correia Martins	17	6
8	Alma Lusa	"Se eu te pudesse abraçar"	José Cid	50	1

Detailed Jury Votes
R/O	Song	M. Domingues	J. Barbosa	N. Galopim	P. de Carvalho	S. Tavares	Total
1	"Uma lua em cada mão"	8	4	4	5	8	29
2	"Saudade que eu sou"	6	5	3	6	5	25
3	"Só o mar ficou"	4	8	6	8	6	32
4	"O encanto da sereia"	5	6	8	4	4	27
5	"Basta só um olhar"	2	1	2	2	1	8
6	"Aqui ou além"	1	2	1	1	2	7
7	"Só à tua espera"	3	3	5	3	3	17
8	"Se eu te pudesse abraçar"	10	10	10	10	10	50

== At Eurovision ==
According to Eurovision rules, all nations with the exceptions of the eight countries which had obtained the lowest average number of points over the last five contests competed in the final on 9 May 1998. On 13 November 1997, an allocation draw was held which determined the running order and Portugal was set to perform in position 14, following the entry from Ireland and before the entry from Romania. The Portuguese conductor at the contest was Mike Sergeant, and Portugal finished in twelfth place with 36 points.

In Portugal, the show was broadcast on RTP1 and RTP Internacional with commentary by Rui Unas. The Portuguese spokesperson, who announced the points awarded by the Portuguese televote, was 1996 contest entrant Lúcia Moniz.

=== Voting ===
Below is a breakdown of points awarded to Portugal and awarded by Portugal in the contest. The nation awarded its 12 points in the contest to Israel.

Points awarded to Portugal
Score	Country
12 points	
10 points	France
8 points	
7 points	
6 points	Spain; Turkey
5 points	
4 points	Macedonia
3 points	
2 points	Cyprus; Israel; Malta; Slovakia
1 point	Belgium; Greece

Points awarded by Portugal
Score	Country
12 points	Israel
10 points	Germany
8 points	Belgium
7 points	Netherlands
6 points	United Kingdom
5 points	Malta
4 points	Cyprus
3 points	Norway
2 points	Croatia
1 point	Ireland
