= Alberta (singer) =

Sierra Leone singer

- Citizenship: Sierra Leone
- Occupation: Singer

Alberta (born Alberta Sheriff) is a singer from Sierra Leone, who twice participated in the United Kingdom's Eurovision Song Contest pre-selection, The Great British Song Contest, finishing second on both occasions. Firstly in 1998 with "Don't It Make You Feel So Good", and then in 1999 with "So Strange".

Her 1998 single, "Yoyo Boy", peaked at 48 in the UK Singles Chart in December that year.

"Don't It Make You Feel So Good" was used in a television advertisement for Danone yogurt drinks.
