= Karl Madis =

Estonian singer

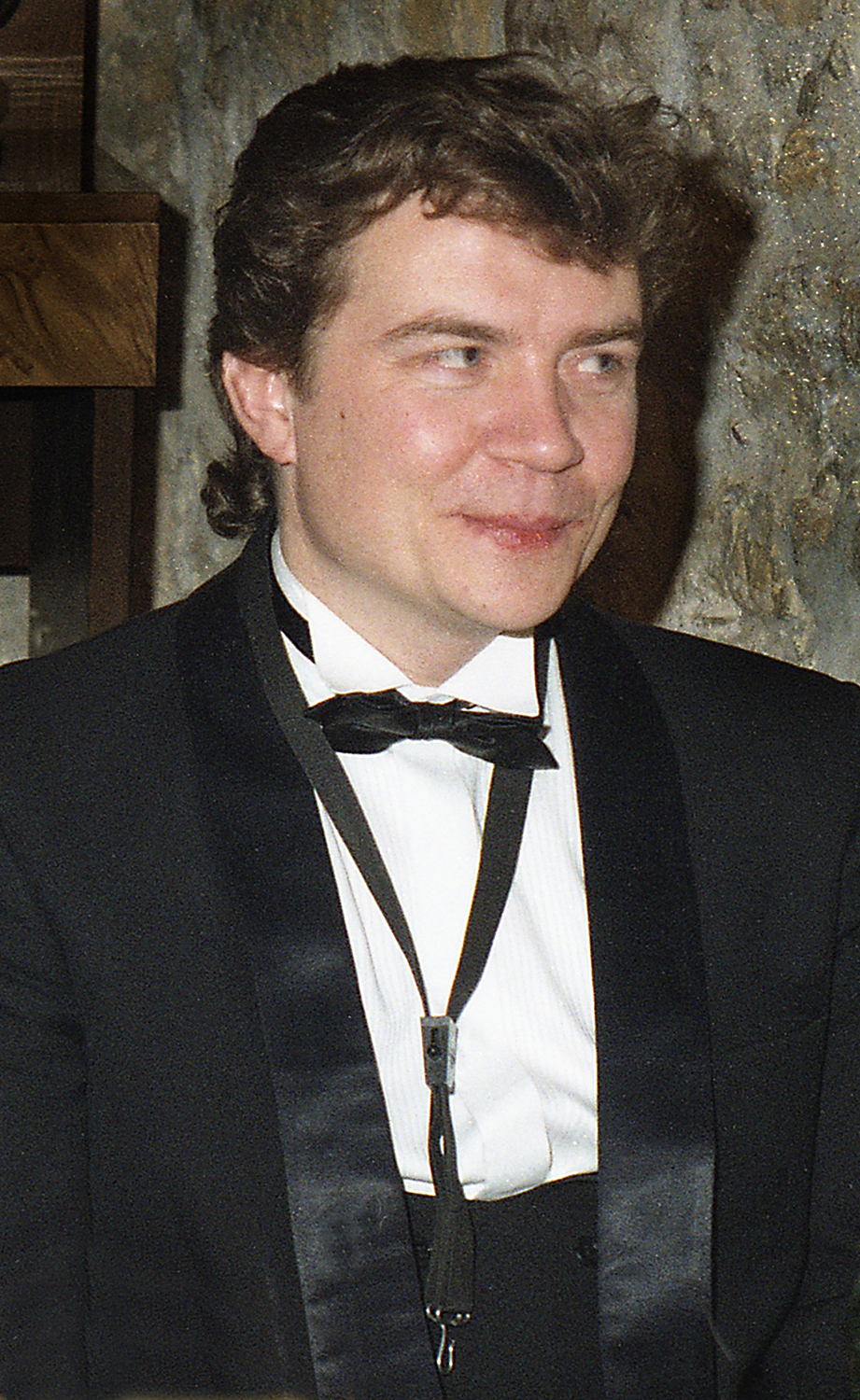
Karl Madis

Karl Madis (born 23 November 1959 in Tallinn) is an Estonian singer.

In 1984 he graduated from Georg Ots Tallinn Music School in saxophone speciality.

He has been a singer for several bands, including Mahavok and Karavan.
