= Cyprus in the Eurovision Song Contest 1998 =

- Eurovision Song Contest 1998
- Participating broadcaster: Cyprus Broadcasting Corporation (CyBC)
- Country: Cyprus
- Selection process: Epilogí Tis Kypriakís Symmetochís Sto Diagonismó Tragoudioú Tis Giourovízion 1998
- Selection date: 11 March 1998

Competing entry
- Song: "Genesis"
- Artist: Michalis Hatzigiannis
- Songwriters: Michalis Hatzigiannis; Zenon Zindilis

Placement
- Final result: 11th, 37 points

Participation chronology

Cyprus was represented at the Eurovision Song Contest 1998 with the song "Genesis" (Γένεσις), composed by Michalis Hatzigiannis, with lyrics by Zenon Zindilis, and performed by Hatzigiannis himself. The Cypriot participating broadcaster, the Cyprus Broadcasting Corporation (CyBC), selected its entry through a national final.

Eight songs competed in the national final, held on 11 March 1998, where a jury chose the winning song. Michalis Hatzigiannis with the song "Genesis" received the most votes and was selected to represent the nation in the contest. Hatzigiannis performed 17th at the international contest and at the close of the voting process, finished in 11th place, receiving 37 points from 10 countries.

== Background ==
Prior to the 1998 contest, the Cyprus Broadcasting Corporation (CyBC) had participated in the Eurovision Song Contest representing Cyprus 16 times since its first entry in 1981. It then participated yearly, only missing the 1988 contest when its selected song "Thimame" by Yiannis Dimitrou was disqualified for being previously released. To this point, its best placing was fifth, which it achieved twice: in 1982 with the song "Mono i agapi" performed by Anna Vissi and in 1997 with "Mana mou" performed by Hara and Andreas Constantinou. Its least successful result was in 1986 when it placed last with the song "Tora zo" by Elpida, receiving only four points in total.

== Before Eurovision ==
=== Epilogí Tis Kypriakís Symmetochís Sto Diagonismó Tragoudioú Tis Giourovízion 1998 ===
==== Competing entries ====
The Cyprus Broadcasting Corporation (CyBC) opened a submission period for Cypriot artists and composers to submit songs until 16 January 1998. By the end of the submission period, 53 entries had been submitted. On 1 February 1998, in radio room one of the CyBC studios, an 11-member jury listened to the received submissions and chose eight songs to compete in the national final.

==== Final ====
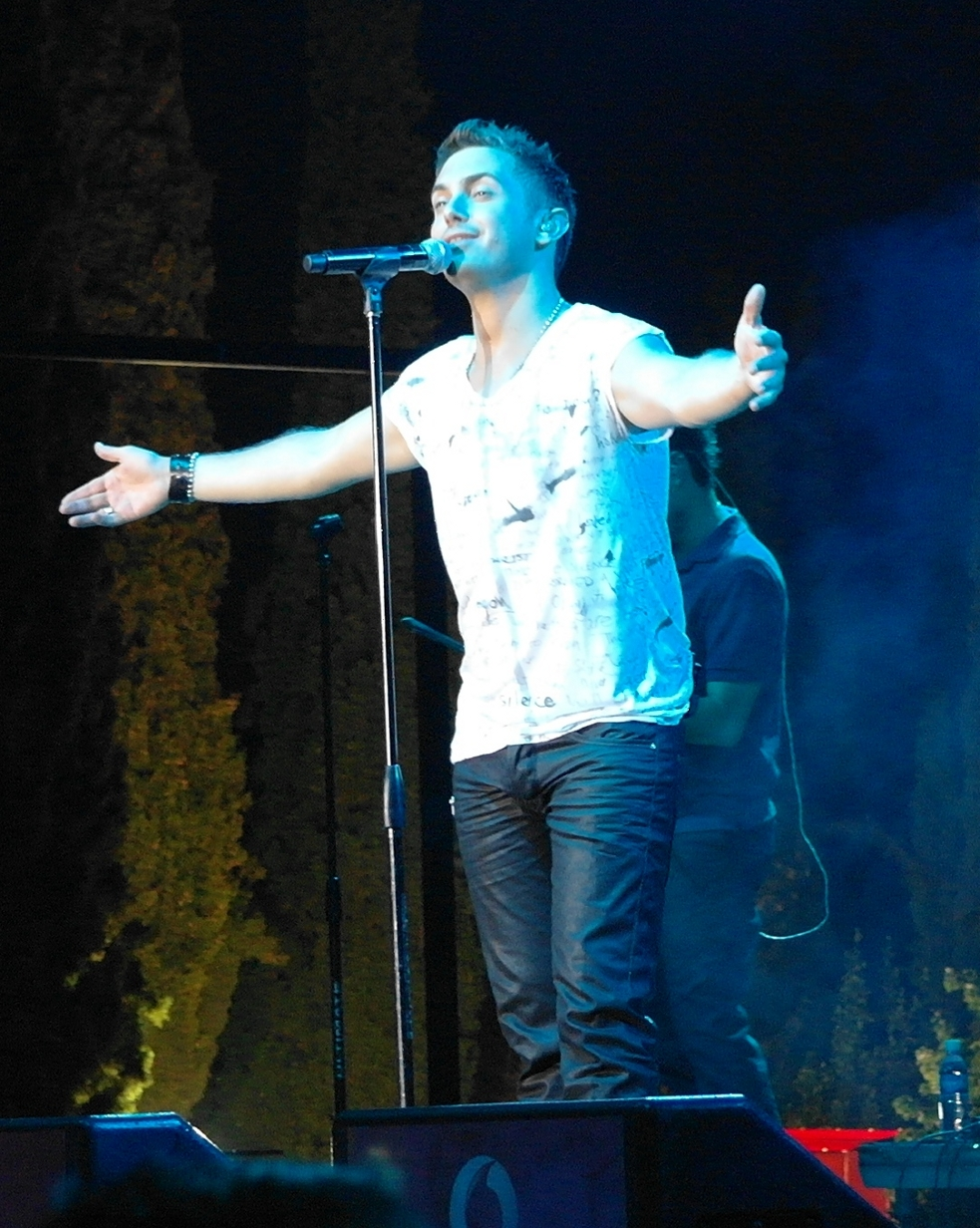
Michalis Hatzigiannis (pictured in 2011) represented Cyprus in 1998 with the song "Genesis".

The final was broadcast live at 21:05 EET on RIK 1 on 11 March 1998 in a show titled Epilogí Tis Kypriakís Symmetochís Sto Diagonismó Tragoudioú Tis Giourovízion 1998 (Greek: Επιλογή Της Κυπριακής Συμμετοχής Στο Διαγωνισμό Τραγουδιού Της Γιουροβίζιον 1998). The contest was held at the Monte Caputo Nightclub in Limassol, and was hosted by Marina Maleni and Loukas Hamatsos. The running order was decided by a random draw which was done in the presence of the songwriters of the competing entries on 3 February 1998. The winner was chosen by a panel of juries appointed by CyBC.

Final – 11 March 1998
R/O	Artist	Song	Songwriter(s)	Points	Place
1	Elena	"Magissa moira" (Μάγισσα μοίρα)	Koralia Schiza	38	8
2	Annie	"Ligi chara gia tin Mona" (Λίγη χαρά για την Μόνα)	Giannis Savvidis, Michalis Michailidis	108	3
3	Nasia Trachonitou	"Prepei na xechasteis" (Πρέπει να ξεχαστείς)	Giorgos Adamou, Christiana Alonefti	52	7
4	Dalida Mitzi	"Nychta min peis" (Νύχτα μην πεις)	Andreas Karanikolas	95	6
5	Kyriakos Zymboulakis	"Oneiro" (Όνειρο)	Kyriakos Zymboulakis	98	5
6	Alexandros Panayi & Marlain Angelidou	"Fterougisma" (Φτερούγισμα)	Giorgos Kallis, Constantinos Odysseos	123	2
7	Giorgos Stamataris	"Onomase me" (Ονόμασέ με)	Andreas Gerolemou, Ioannis Hatzigeorgiou	108	3
8	Michalis Hatzigiannis	"Genesis" (Γένεσις)	Michalis Hatzigiannis, Zenon Zindilis	158	1

== At Eurovision ==
The Eurovision Song Contest 1998 took place at the National Indoor Arena in Birmingham, United Kingdom on 9 May 1998. According to the Eurovision rules, the 25-country participant list for the contest was composed of: the winning country from the previous year's contest; the 17 countries, other than the previous year's winner, which had obtained the highest average number of points over the last five contests; and any countries which had not participated in the previous year's content. Following confirmation of the participant list, the running order for the contest was decided by a draw held on 13 November 1998; Cyprus was assigned position 17, following United Kingdom and preceding Netherlands.

=== Voting ===
The same voting system in use since 1975 was again implemented for the contest, with each country providing 1–8, 10 and 12 points to their 10 highest-ranking songs, with countries not allowed to vote for themselves. For the first time however, the contest results were determined predominantly by public voting via telephone, following a successful trial among five countries the previous year; an eight-member back-up jury was also assembled in case technical failures rendered the telephone votes invalid. The use of televoting caused phone lines in Cyprus to be jammed as viewers attempted to cast their votes using the 60 phone lines assigned to the contest. Despite receiving over 150,000 calls for votes, only 5,000 were registered during the five-minute voting window.

Points awarded to Cyprus
Score	Country
12 points	Greece
10 points	
8 points	
7 points	
6 points	
5 points	Slovakia
4 points	Croatia; Portugal; Romania
3 points	United Kingdom
2 points	Belgium
1 point	Hungary; Israel; Malta

Points awarded by Cyprus
Score	Country
12 points	Greece
10 points	Israel
8 points	United Kingdom
7 points	Croatia
6 points	Belgium
5 points	Malta
4 points	Spain
3 points	Norway
2 points	Portugal
1 point	France
