= Greece in the Eurovision Song Contest 1998 =

- Eurovision Song Contest 1998
- Participating broadcaster: Hellenic Broadcasting Corporation (ERT)
- Country: Greece
- Selection process: National final
- Selection date: 7 March 1998

Competing entry
- Song: "Mia krifi evaisthisia"
- Artist: Thalassa
- Songwriters: Yiannis Valvis; Yiannis Malachias

Placement
- Final result: 20th, 12 points

Participation chronology

Greece was represented at the Eurovision Song Contest 1998 with the song "Mia krifi evaisthisia" (Μια κρυφή ευαισθησία), composed by Yiannis Valvis, with lyrics by Yiannis Malachias, and performed by Thalassa. The Greek participating broadcaster, the Hellenic Broadcasting Corporation (ERT), selected its entry through a national final.

Performing second in the running order at the contest, they finished in 20th place out of the 25 countries competing. This marked a new record for the least successful placement for Greece.

== Background ==
Prior to the 1998 contest, the National Radio Television Foundation (EIRT) in 1974, and the Hellenic Broadcasting Corporation (ERT) since 1975, had participated in the Eurovision Song Contest representing Greece 20 times since EIRT debut in 1974. By 1998, their best result was fifth place which was achieved twice: in 1977 with the song "Mathima solfege" performed by the band Paschalis, Marianna, Robert and Bessy and in in 1992 with "Olou tou kosmou i Elpida" performed by Cleopatra. Their least successful result was in 1990 when it placed 19th with the song "Horis skopo" by Christos Callow and Wave, receiving only 11 points in total.

== Before Eurovision ==
=== National final ===
Before the final, ERT held eight semi-finals at its television studios in Athens, hosted by Giorgos Marinos. Televoting selected the winning song in each semi-final to qualify for the final.

==== Semi-finals ====
Semi-final 1
R/O	Artist	Song	Televote	Place
1	Yiannis Haniotakis	"Gynekes" (Γυναίκες)	1,799	3
2	Marianna Efstratiou	"Ekleges gia mena" (Έκλαιγες για μένα)	3,438	2
3	Katerina Kourentzi	"Na ziso to fili" (Να ζήσω το φιλί)	3,890	1

Semi-final 2
R/O	Artist	Song	Televote	Place
1	Kostas Katsigiannis	"Me ekatonpeninta" (Με εκατόν πενήντα)	2,086	3
2	Theodoros Zaharis	"Tha s'agapo" (Θα σ'αγαπώ)	5,609	1
3	Dionysis Schinas	"Palies agapes" (Παλιές αγάπες)	4,102	2

Semi-final 3
R/O	Artist	Song	Televote	Place
1	Haralampos Kavalieros	"Agapi pou pote" (Αγάπη που ποτέ)	3,218	2
2	Evi Dikou	"San oneiro" (Σαν όνειρο)	2,156	3
3	Dionysia Karoki and Thalassa	"Mia krifi evaisthisia" (Μια κρυφή ευαισθησία)	9,226	1

Semi-final 4
R/O	Artist	Song	Televote	Place
1	Stamatis Papadakis	"Erota sofe" (Έρωτα σοφέ)	1,423	2
2	Yiannis Haniotakis	"An itan i agapi" (Αν ήταν η αγάπη)	1,382	3
3	Hara Konstantinou	"Fantasia mou" (Φαντασία μου)	3,323	1

Semi-final 5
R/O	Artist	Song	Televote	Place
1	Victor Polydorou	"Melodia" (Μελωδία)	3,383	2
2	Iro Lehouriti	"Tipota" (Τίποτα)	5,232	1
3	Yiannis Drakopoulos	"Alexandra" (Αλεξάνδρα)	1,366	3

Semi-final 6
R/O	Artist	Song	Televote	Place
1	Marianna Efstratiou	"Opos i vrochi" (Όπως η βροχή)	3,199	2
2	Stavros Siolas	"Agapi moni" (Αγάπη μόνη)	1,861	3
3	Nikos Blios	"Kita to fos" (Κοίτα το φως)	3,264	1

Semi-final 7
R/O	Artist	Song	Televote	Place
1	Nikos Katikaridis	"O vasilias ton ftohon" (Ο βασιλιάς τών φτωχών)	5,614	3
2	Marianna Efstratiou	"Ta hili pou filouses" (Τα χειλή που φιλούσες)	5,891	2
3	Vivetta Koursi	"Se nostalgo" (Σε νοσταλγώ)	10,706	1

Semi-final 8
R/O	Artist	Song	Televote	Place
1	Efstathia Mantzoufa	"Deisdaemona" (Δεισδαίμονα)	4,677	3
2	Dionysia Karoki and Thalassa	"Kosme cinema" (Κόσμε σινεμά)	7,580	1
3	Robert Williams, Konstantinos Paliatsaras and Mara Thrasivoulidou	"Promitheas" (Προμηθέας)	6,299	2

==== Final ====
ERT held the final on 7 March 1998 at its television studios in Athens, hosted by Giorgos Marinos. The winner was chosen by televoting. At the end of the event, Dionisia Karoki and Thalassa were selected to represent Greece with the song "Mia krifi evaisthisia". Following the selection, the group did not receive promotional support for the entry and they were not signed to a record label.

Final – 7 March 1998
R/O	Singer	Song	Televote	Place
1	Nikos Blios	"Kita to fos" (Κοίτα το φως)	7,274	5
2	Iro Lehouriti	"Tipota" (Τίποτα)	19,421	2
3	Katerina Kourentzi	"Na ziso to fili" (Να ζήσω το φιλί)	8,249	4
4	Dionysia Karoki and Thalassa	"Kosme cinema" (Κόσμε σινεμά)	2,295	7
5	Hara Konstantinou	"Fantasia mou" (Φαντασία μου)	1,538	8
6	Theodoros Zaharis	"Tha s'agapo" (Θα σ'αγαπώ)	5,964	6
7	Vivetta Koursi	"Se nostalgo" (Σε νοσταλγώ)	17,364	3
8	Dionysia Karoki and Thalassa	"Mia krifi evaisthisia" (Μια κρυφή ευαισθησία)	19,477	1

== At Eurovision ==
The Eurovision Song Contest 1998 took place at National Indoor Arena in Birmingham, United Kingdom, on 9 May 1998. Following confirmation of the 25-country participant list, the running order for the contest was decided by a draw held on 13 November 1997; Greece was assigned to perform second, following Croatia and preceding France.

In the lead up to the event, the song's composer, Yiannis Valvis, was not happy with the way the group's performance was to be filmed and demanded changes. When his demands were not met, the group threatened to quit the contest on the morning of the final day of rehearsals, and on the afternoon, they pulled out. Only minutes after their withdrawal, however, the group returned to the green room, having decided to go through with the performance after all, without the composer watching them on stage. Valvis was not permitted to attend the contest, on account of his aggressive behaviour. He watched the contest locked inside his hotel room with two security guards guarding his door.

The Greek spokesperson announcing the nation's votes was Alexis Kostalas who, with the exceptions of 1999 and 2000 in which Greece did not participate, would serve as spokesperson until 2010. At the close of voting, "Mia krifi evaisthisia" received 12 points in total, all from Cyprus, placing Greece 20th out of the 25 entries. This was the worst result for Greece in the contest at this point, and remained as so until 2016. Following this result, Greece was relegated from participation in 1999 contest.

=== Voting ===
Points awarded to Greece
Score	Country
12 points	Cyprus
10 points	
8 points	
7 points	
6 points	
5 points	
4 points	
3 points	
2 points	
1 point	

Points awarded by Greece
Score	Country
12 points	Cyprus
10 points	Israel
8 points	Netherlands
7 points	United Kingdom
6 points	Malta
5 points	Croatia
4 points	Belgium
3 points	Germany
2 points	Slovenia
1 point	Portugal
