= Norway in the Eurovision Song Contest 1998 =

- Eurovision Song Contest 1998
- Participating broadcaster: Norsk rikskringkasting (NRK)
- Country: Norway
- Selection process: Melodi Grand Prix 1998
- Selection date: 28 February 1998

Competing entry
- Song: "Alltid sommer"
- Artist: Lars A. Fredriksen
- Songwriters: David Eriksen; Linda Andernach Johansen

Placement
- Final result: 8th, 79 points

Participation chronology

Norway was represented at the Eurovision Song Contest 1998 with the song "Alltid sommer", composed by David Eriksen, with lyrics by Linda Andernach Johansen, and performed by Lars A. Fredriksen. The Norwegian participating broadcaster, Norsk rikskringkasting (NRK), organised the national final Melodi Grand Prix 1998 in order to select its entry for the contest. Eight entries competed in a show that took place on 27 February 1999 and the winner, "All I Ever Wanted (Was You)" performed by Lars A. Fredriksen, was determined by the votes from a six-member jury panel and a regional televote. The song was later translated from English to Norwegian for Eurovision and was titled "Alltid sommer".

Norway competed in the Eurovision Song Contest which took place on 9 May 1999. Performing during the show in position 22, Norway placed eighth out of the 25 participating countries, scoring 79 points.

== Background ==
Prior to the 1998 contest, Norsk rikskringkasting (NRK) had participated in the Eurovision Song Contest representing Norway 37 times since its first entry in 1960.It had won the contest on two occasions: in 1985 with the song "La det swinge" performed by Bobbysocks!, and in 1995 with the song "Nocturne" performed by Secret Garden. It also had the two distinctions of having finished last in the Eurovision final more than any other country and for having the most nul points (zero points) in the contest, the latter being a record the nation shared together with Austria. It had finished last seven times and had failed to score a point during four contests.

As part of its duties as participating broadcaster, NRK organises the selection of its entry in the Eurovision Song Contest and broadcasts the event in the country. The broadcaster has traditionally organised the national final Melodi Grand Prix to select its entry for the contest in all but one of its participation. NRK organized Melodi Grand Prix 1998 in order to select its 1998 entry.

== Before Eurovision ==
=== Melodi Grand Prix 1998 ===
Melodi Grand Prix 1998 was the 37th edition of the national final Melodi Grand Prix and was organised by NRK to select its entry for the Eurovision Song Contest 1998. The broadcaster held the show on 28 February 1998 at its Studio 2 in Oslo, hosted by Øystein Bache and Rune Gokstad, and televised on NRK1. A live orchestra conducted by Geir Langslet accompanied each performance in varying capacities. The national final was watched by 1.271 million viewers in Norway.

==== Competing entries ====
Composers were directly invited by NRK to compete in the national final. Eight songs were selected for the competition and among the competing artists was former Eurovision entrant Elisabeth Andreassen who represented Sweden in 1982 (as part of Chips), Norway in 1985 (as part of Bobbysocks!), Norway in 1994 (alongside Jan Werner Danielsen), and Norway in 1996. For the first time in Melodi Grand Prix, artists were allowed to perform their song in English, with Andreassen, G'stén and Lars A. Fredriksen opting to do so.

| Artist | Song | Songwriter(s) |
|---|---|---|
| Bjelleklang | "På do" | Finn Evensen |
| Christin Hoff and Erik Jacobsen | "Bare du og jeg" | Ulf Risnes |
| Elisabeth Andreassen | "Winds of the Northern Seas" | Torhild Nigar, Rolf Graf |
| G'stén | "Always Will" | Kyrre Fritzner, Åge Sten Nilsen |
| Gjermund Elgenes | "Som en engel" | Ingrid Bjørnov |
| Lars A. Fredriksen | "All I Ever Wanted (Was You)" | David Eriksen, Per Kristian Ottestad |
| Malin Holberg | "En ny mårrån" | Stein Berge Svendsen, Nora Skaug, Malin Holberg |
| Tore Holm | "Nam nam" | Geir Olav Bøkestad, Per Kristian Indrehus |

==== Final ====
Eight songs competed during the final on 28 February 1998. The winner was selected by a combination of votes from regional televoting (5/7) and an expert jury (2/7). The results of the public televote were divided into Norway's five regions and each region distributed points as follows: 1, 2, 3, 5, 7 and 10 points. The jury then distributed points that had a weighting equal to the votes of two televoting regions, leading to the victory of "All I Ever Wanted (Was You)" performed by Lars A. Fredriksen. The jury panel consisted of Ellen Foss-Sørensen (NRK P2 radio host), Tor Milde (music journalist), Finn Bjelke (NRK P3 radio producer), Olve Brekke (product manager), Stein Dag Jensen (NRK P1 radio host) and Silje Stang (P4 Radio music director and TVNorge presenter). More than 63,000 votes were registered by the televote during the show, however Telenor later revealed that an additional 440,000 votes were unable to be registered due to technical issues. In addition to the performances of the competing entries, the interval act featured the Great Garlic Girls performing several past British Eurovision entries.

Final – 28 February 1998
| R/O | Artist | Song | Jury | Public | Total | Place |
|---|---|---|---|---|---|---|
| 1 | Lars A. Fredriksen | "All I Ever Wanted (Was You)" | 6 | 50 | 56 | 1 |
| 2 | Christin Hoff and Erik Jacobsen | "Bare du og jeg" | 14 | 0 | 14 | 6 |
| 3 | Gjermund Elgenes | "Som en engel" | 4 | 1 | 5 | 7 |
| 4 | G'stén | "Always Will" | 20 | 11 | 31 | 3 |
| 5 | Elisabeth Andreassen | "Winds of the Northern Seas" | 10 | 35 | 45 | 2 |
| 6 | Bjelleklang | "På do" | 0 | 23 | 23 | 4 |
| 7 | Tore Holm | "Nam nam" | 0 | 4 | 4 | 8 |
| 8 | Malin Holberg | "En ny mårrån" | 2 | 16 | 18 | 5 |

Detailed Regional Televoting Results
| Song | Trondheim | Tromsø | Bergen | Kristiansand | Oslo | Total |
|---|---|---|---|---|---|---|
| "All I Ever Wanted (Was You)" | 10 | 10 | 10 | 10 | 10 | 50 |
| "Bare du og jeg" | | | | | | 0 |
| "Som en engel" | | 1 | | | | 1 |
| "Always Will" | 2 | 2 | 2 | 2 | 3 | 11 |
| "Winds of the Northern Seas" | 7 | 7 | 7 | 7 | 7 | 35 |
| "På do" | 3 | 5 | 5 | 5 | 5 | 23 |
| "Nam nam" | 1 | | 1 | 1 | 1 | 4 |
| "En ny mårrån" | 5 | 3 | 3 | 3 | 2 | 16 |

== At Eurovision ==
According to Eurovision rules, all nations with the exceptions of the eight countries which had obtained the lowest average number of points over the last five contests competed in the final on 9 May 1998. On 13 November 1997, an allocation draw was held which determined the running order and Norway was set to perform in position 22, following the entry from Finland and before the entry from Estonia. At the contest, Lars A. Fredriksen performed the Norwegian version of "All I Ever Wanted (Was You)", titled "Alltid sommer". The Norwegian conductor at the contest was Geir Langslet, and Norway finished in eighth place with 79 points.

In Norway, the show was broadcast on NRK1 with commentary by Jostein Pedersen as well as broadcast via radio on NRK P1 with commentary by Stein Dag Jensen. NRK appointed Ragnhild Sælthun Fjørtoft as its spokesperson to announce the Norwegian votes during the show.

=== Voting ===
Below is a breakdown of points awarded to Norway and awarded by Norway in the contest. The nation awarded its 12 points to Malta in the contest.

Points awarded to Norway
| Score | Country |
|---|---|
| 12 points | Sweden |
| 10 points | Slovenia |
| 8 points | Spain |
| 7 points | |
| 6 points | |
| 5 points | Hungary; Malta |
| 4 points | Belgium; Estonia; Ireland; Israel; Poland; United Kingdom |
| 3 points | Cyprus; Germany; Netherlands; Portugal |
| 2 points | Finland |
| 1 point | Switzerland |

Points awarded by Norway
| Score | Country |
|---|---|
| 12 points | Malta |
| 10 points | Sweden |
| 8 points | Netherlands |
| 7 points | Belgium |
| 6 points | Croatia |
| 5 points | United Kingdom |
| 4 points | Ireland |
| 3 points | Israel |
| 2 points | Hungary |
| 1 point | Finland |
