= Netherlands in the Eurovision Song Contest 1998 =

- Eurovision Song Contest 1998
- Participating broadcaster: Nederlandse Omroep Stichting (NOS)
- Country: Netherlands
- Selection process: Nationaal Songfestival 1998
- Selection date: 8 March 1998

Competing entry
- Song: "Hemel en aarde"
- Artist: Edsilia Rombley
- Songwriters: Eric van Tijn; Jochem Fluitsma

Placement
- Final result: 4th, 150 points

Participation chronology

The Netherlands was represented at the Eurovision Song Contest 1998 with the song "Hemel en aarde", written by Eric van Tijn and Jochem Fluitsma, and performed by Edsilia Rombley. The Dutch participating broadcaster, Nederlandse Omroep Stichting (NOS), selected its entry for the contest through Nationaal Songfestival 1998. Eight entries competed in the national final on 8 March 1998 where "Hemel en aarde" performed by Edsilia Rombley was selected as the winner following the combination of votes from an eight-member jury panel and a public vote.

The Netherlands competed in the Eurovision Song Contest which took place on 9 May 1998. Performing during the show in position 18, the Netherlands placed fourth out of the 25 participating countries, scoring 150 points.

== Background ==
Prior to the 1998 contest, Nederlandse Televisie Stichting (NTS) until 1969, and Nederlandse Omroep Stichting (NOS) since 1970, had participated in the Eurovision Song Contest representing the Netherlands thirty-nine times since NTS début in the inaugural contest in 1956. They have won the contest four times: in 1957 with the song "Net als toen" performed by Corry Brokken; in 1959 with the song "'n Beetje" performed by Teddy Scholten; in 1969 as one of four countries to tie for first place with "De troubadour" performed by Lenny Kuhr; and finally in 1975 with "Ding-a-dong" performed by the group Teach-In. The Dutch least successful result has been last place, which they have achieved on four occasions, most recently in the 1968 contest. They has also received nul points on two occasions; in 1962 and 1963.

As part of its duties as participating broadcaster, NOS organises the selection of its entry in the Eurovision Song Contest and broadcasts the event in the country. The Dutch broadcasters had used various methods to select the Dutch entry in the past, such as the Nationaal Songfestival, a live televised national final to choose the performer, song or both to compete at Eurovision. However, internal selections have also been held on occasion. In 1997, NOS has internally selected the artist for the contest, while Nationaal Songfestival was organised in order to select the song. For 1998, Nationaal Songfestival was continued to select both the artist and song.

== Before Eurovision ==
=== Nationaal Songfestival 1998 ===
Nationaal Songfestival 1998 was the national final developed by NOS that selected its entry for the Eurovision Song Contest 1998. Eight entries competed in the competition that consisted of a final on 8 March 1998 which took place at the Rai Congrescentrum in Amsterdam, hosted by Paul de Leeuw and Linda de Mol and was broadcast on TV2.

==== Competing entries ====
107 submissions were received by the Dutch broadcaster following a submission period and the eight selected competing entries were announced on 2 February 1998. Four of the entries for the competition came from the public submission, while the remaining four entries came from composers directly invited by NOS.

Artist	Song	Songwriter(s)	Selection
Claudia Nelson	"Zintuigen"	Harto Soemodihardjo, Derick Stadwijk, Sjon Looy	Open submission
Edsilia Rombley	"Hemel en aarde"	Eric van Tijn, Jochem Fluitsma	Invited by NOS
Frederique Spigt	"Mijn hart kan dat niet aan"	Leo van de Ketterij, Huub van der Lubbe	Open submission
Marco Marlé	"Hou me nu maar vast"	Theo Nabuurs, Ramon Roelofs	Invited by NOS
Nubia	"Ze kwamen over zee"	Ad van Olm	Open submission
Nurlaila	"Alsof je bij me bent"	John Ewbank	Invited by NOS
Ryan van den Akker and Lone van Rozendaal	"Over"	Fons Merkies, Jack Pisters, Hans Ravestein, Edwin de Jong	Open submission
Sylvia Samson	"Mijn wens voor 2000"	Henk Temming, Jan de Roos	Invited by NOS

==== Final ====
The final took place on 8 March 1998 where eight entries competed. The winner, "Hemel en aarde" performed by Edsilia Rombley, was selected by the 50/50 combination of a public televote and the votes of an eight-member expert jury. The viewers and the juries each had a total of 256 points to award. Each juror distributed their points as follows: 1, 2, 3, 4, 5, 7 and 10 points. The viewer vote was based on the percentage of votes each song achieved. For example, if a song gained 10% of the vote, then that entry would be awarded 10% of 256 points rounded to the nearest integer: 26 points. The expert jury panel consisted of Angela Groothuizen (singer), Cor Bakker (pianist), Cornald Maas (television editor), Martin Buitenhuis (singer-songwriter, member of the group Van Dik Hout), Sandra Reemer (singer, who represented the Netherlands in 1972, in 1976, and in 1979), Albert Verlinde (television producer and editor), Ton de Zeeuw (journalist at De Telegraaf) and Manuela Kemp (singer and television presenter), while 250,000 votes were cast by the public during the show. In addition to the performances of the competing entries, the show featured guest performances by Katrina and the Waves (1997 Eurovision winner).

Final – 8 March 1998
R/O	Artist	Song	Jury	Televote	Total	Place
1	Sylvia Samson	"Mijn wens voor 2000"	28	10	38	7
2	Frederique Spigt	"Mijn hart kan dat niet aan"	49	21	70	3
3	Marco Marlé	"Hou me nu maar vast"	9	20	29	8
4	Ryan van den Akker and Lone van Rozendaal	"Over"	17	31	48	5
5	Edsilia Rombley	"Hemel en aarde"	57	81	138	1
6	Nubia	"Ze kwamen overzee"	14	51	65	4
7	Nurlaila	"Alsof je bij me bent"	49	35	84	2
8	Claudia Nelson	"Zintuigen"	33	7	40	6

Detailed Jury Votes
R/O	Song	A. Groothuizen	C. Bakker	M. Buitenhuis	C. Maas	S. Reemer	A. Verlinde	T. de Zeeuw	M. Kemp	Total
1	"Mijn wens voor 2000"	5	3	10	3	3	2	1	1	28
2	"Mijn hart kan dat niet aan"	4	4	7	10	5	4	5	10	49
3	"Hou me nu maar vast"	1	1	2	1	1	3			9
4	"Over"	2	2	3	2	2	1	3	2	17
5	"Hemel en aarde"	10	7	5	7	7	7	7	7	57
6	"Ze kwamen over zee"			1				10	3	14
7	"Alsof je bij me bent"	7	10		4	10	10	4	4	49
8	"Zintuigen"	3	5	4	5	4	5	2	5	33

== At Eurovision ==
According to Eurovision rules, all nations with the exceptions of the eight countries which had obtained the lowest average number of points over the last five contests competed in the final on 9 May 1998. On 13 November 1997, a special allocation draw was held which determined the running order and the Netherlands was set to perform in position 18, following the entry from Cyprus and before the entry from Sweden. The Dutch conductor at the contest was Dick Bakker, and the Netherlands finished in fourth place with 150 points.

The show was broadcast in the Netherlands on TV2 with commentary by Willem van Beusekom as well as via radio on Radio 2. The contest was watched by 3.1 million people. NOS appointed Conny Vandenbos as its spokesperson to announce the Dutch votes during the show.

=== Voting ===
Below is a breakdown of points awarded to the Netherlands and awarded by the Netherlands in the contest. The nation awarded its 12 points to Germany in the contest.

Points awarded to the Netherlands
Score	Country
12 points	Belgium; Hungary
10 points	Croatia; Ireland; United Kingdom
8 points	Greece; Israel; Norway; Sweden
7 points	Finland; Malta; Portugal; Switzerland; Turkey
6 points	Germany; Slovakia
5 points	France; Poland
4 points	Spain
3 points	Macedonia
2 points	
1 point	

Points awarded by the Netherlands
Score	Country
12 points	Germany
10 points	Belgium
8 points	Malta
7 points	United Kingdom
6 points	Israel
5 points	Sweden
4 points	Croatia
3 points	Norway
2 points	Estonia
1 point	Turkey
