= Ulvaeus =

Ulvaeus is a Swedish surname. Notable people with the surname include:

- Björn Ulvaeus (born 1945), Swedish songwriter, composer, and musician
- Linda Ulvaeus (born 1973), Swedish singer-songwriter and actress
