= Spain in the Eurovision Song Contest 1998 =

- Eurovision Song Contest 1998
- Participating broadcaster: Televisión Española (TVE)
- Country: Spain
- Selection process: Internal selection
- Announcement date: 5 March 1998

Competing entry
- Song: "¿Qué voy a hacer sin ti?"
- Artist: Mikel Herzog
- Songwriters: Adolfo Estébanez; Mikel Herzog

Placement
- Final result: 16th, 21 points

Participation chronology

Spain was represented at the Eurovision Song Contest 1998 with the song "¿Qué voy a hacer sin ti?", composed by Adolfo Estébanez, with lyrics by Mikel Herzog, and performed by Herzog himself. The Spanish participating broadcaster, Televisión Española (TVE), selected internally both the song and the performer.

== Before Eurovision ==
In order to select its entry for the 1998 contest, Televisión Española (TVE) held an internal selection. Ultimately, the song "¿Qué voy a hacer sin ti?" performed by Mikel Herzog was selected. It was announced as the Spanish entry on 5 March 1998.

== At Eurovision ==
Herzog performed fourth in the running order, following France and preceding Switzerland. He received 21 points for his performance, coming 16th.

=== Voting ===
Points awarded to Spain
Score	Country
12 points	
10 points	
8 points	
7 points	
6 points	Switzerland
5 points	
4 points	Cyprus; France
3 points	Belgium; Israel
2 points	
1 point	Croatia

Points awarded by Spain
Score	Country
12 points	Germany
10 points	Israel
8 points	Norway
7 points	Belgium
6 points	Portugal
5 points	Malta
4 points	Netherlands
3 points	United Kingdom
2 points	Estonia
1 point	Croatia
