= Israel in the Eurovision Song Contest 1998 =

- Eurovision Song Contest 1998
- Participating broadcaster: Israel Broadcasting Authority (IBA)
- Country: Israel
- Selection process: Internal selection
- Announcement date: 23 November 1997

Competing entry
- Song: "Diva"
- Artist: Dana International
- Songwriters: Svika Pick; Yoav Ginai

Placement
- Final result: 1st, 172 points

Participation chronology

Israel was represented at the Eurovision Song Contest 1998 with the song "Diva", composed by Svika Pick, with lyrics by Yoav Ginai, and performed by Dana International. The Israeli participating broadcaster, the Israel Broadcasting Authority (IBA), internally selected its entry for the contest. The entry eventually won the Eurovision Song Contest.

== Before Eurovision ==
=== Internal selection ===
Fifteen songs were submitted by the public to the Israel Broadcasting Authority (IBA), where they were subsequently evaluated by a special committee that selected the Israeli entry for 1998 contest. On 23 November 1997, IBA announced that Dana International was selected as the Israeli representative for the Eurovision Song Contest 1998 with the song "Diva". Among entries considered by the selection committee, "Shir Tikva" performed by Arkadi Duchin and Halimonim was highly considered before Dana International was ultimately selected.

Internal selection - First Round
Artist(s)	Song
Arkadi Duchin and Halimonim	"Shir Tikva"
Dana International	"Diva"
Hi-Five	Unknown
Josefa Barocha Frindlach	"Malach"
Ufira Yosefi	Unknown

Internal selection - Second Round
Artist(s)	Song	Points
Arkadi Duchin and Halimonim	"Shir Tikva"	Unknown
Dana International	"Diva"	78

== At Eurovision ==
Israel was drawn to compete eighth in the contest, held on 9 May 1998. At the end of the night the nation placed 1st in the field of 25 entries, receiving 172 points.

=== Voting ===
Points awarded to Israel
Score	Country
12 points	France; Malta; Portugal
10 points	Belgium; Cyprus; Finland; Greece; Poland; Spain; Switzerland
8 points	Macedonia
7 points	Estonia; Germany; Romania; Slovenia
6 points	Ireland; Netherlands
5 points	Sweden; Turkey; United Kingdom
4 points	
3 points	Norway
2 points	
1 point	

Points awarded by Israel
Score	Country
12 points	United Kingdom
10 points	Croatia
8 points	Netherlands
7 points	Malta
6 points	Romania
5 points	Belgium
4 points	Norway
3 points	Spain
2 points	Portugal
1 point	Cyprus

== Congratulations: 50 Years of the Eurovision Song Contest ==
"Diva" was one of fourteen Eurovision songs selected by fans to participate in the Congratulations 50th anniversary show in 2005. It was both the only entry from the '90s and the only Israeli entry to appear in the main competition. The song was drawn to perform third, following "What's Another Year?" by Johnny Logan and preceding "Eres tú" by Mocedades. Like the other acts that night, "Diva" was represented by dancers performing alongside footage of Dana International's original performance from 1998, with Dana herself appearing to lip-sync to the ending of the song and introduce the next act. She would appear later in the show to perform an English version of Baccara's "Parlez-vous français?" during a medley of Eurovision favorites.

At the end of the first round, "Diva" was not among the five songs proceeding to the final round. It was later revealed that "Diva" finished thirteenth with 39 points. It received a sole 12 points from Israel themselves, who (unlike in standard Eurovision editions) were allowed to vote for their own entry.

=== Voting ===
Points awarded to "Diva" (Round 1)
Score	Country
12 points	Israel
10 points	
8 points	
7 points	
6 points	Russia
5 points	
4 points	Ukraine
3 points	Belgium; Finland; Spain
2 points	Latvia; Lithuania; Serbia and Montenegro
1 point	Cyprus; Monaco
