= Germany in the Eurovision Song Contest 1998 =

- Eurovision Song Contest 1998
- Participating broadcaster: ARD (Note: Arbeitsgemeinschaft der öffentlich-rechtlichen Rundfunkanstalten der Bundesrepublik Deutschland) – Norddeutscher Rundfunk (NDR)
- Country: Germany
- Selection process: Countdown Grand Prix 1998
- Selection date: 26 February 1998

Competing entry
- Song: "Guildo hat euch lieb!"
- Artist: Guildo Horn
- Songwriter: Stefan Raab

Placement
- Final result: 7th, 86 points

Participation chronology

Germany was represented at the Eurovision Song Contest 1998 with the song "Guildo hat euch lieb!", written by Alf Igel, and performed by Guildo Horn. The German participating broadcaster on behalf of ARD, Norddeutscher Rundfunk (NDR), organised the national final Countdown Grand Prix 1998 in order to select their entry for the contest. The national final took place on 26 February 1998 and featured eleven competing acts with the winner being selected through public televoting. "Guildo hat euch lieb!" performed by Guildo Horn won the national final after gaining 426,050 of the votes.

Germany competed in the Eurovision Song Contest which took place on 9 May 1998. Performing during the show in position 9, Germany placed seventh out of the 25 participating countries, scoring 86 points.

== Background ==
Prior to the 1998 Contest, ARD had participated in the Eurovision Song Contest representing Germany forty-one times since its debut in 1956. It has won the contest on one occasion: in 1982 with the song "Ein bißchen Frieden" performed by Nicole. Germany, to this point, has been noted for having appeared in the contest more than any other country; they have competed in every contest since the first edition in 1956 except for 1996 when it was eliminated in a pre-contest elimination round. In 1997, the German entry "Zeit" performed by Bianca Shomburg placed eighteenth out of twenty-five competing songs scoring 22 points.

As part of its duties as participating broadcaster, ARD organises the selection of its entry in the Eurovision Song Contest and broadcasts the event in the country. Since 1996, ARD had delegated the participation in the contest to its member Norddeutscher Rundfunk (NDR). NDR had set up national finals with several artists to choose both the song and performer to compete at Eurovision. The broadcaster organised a multi-artist national final in cooperation to select their entry for the 1998 contest.

== Before Eurovision ==
=== Countdown Grand Prix 1998 ===
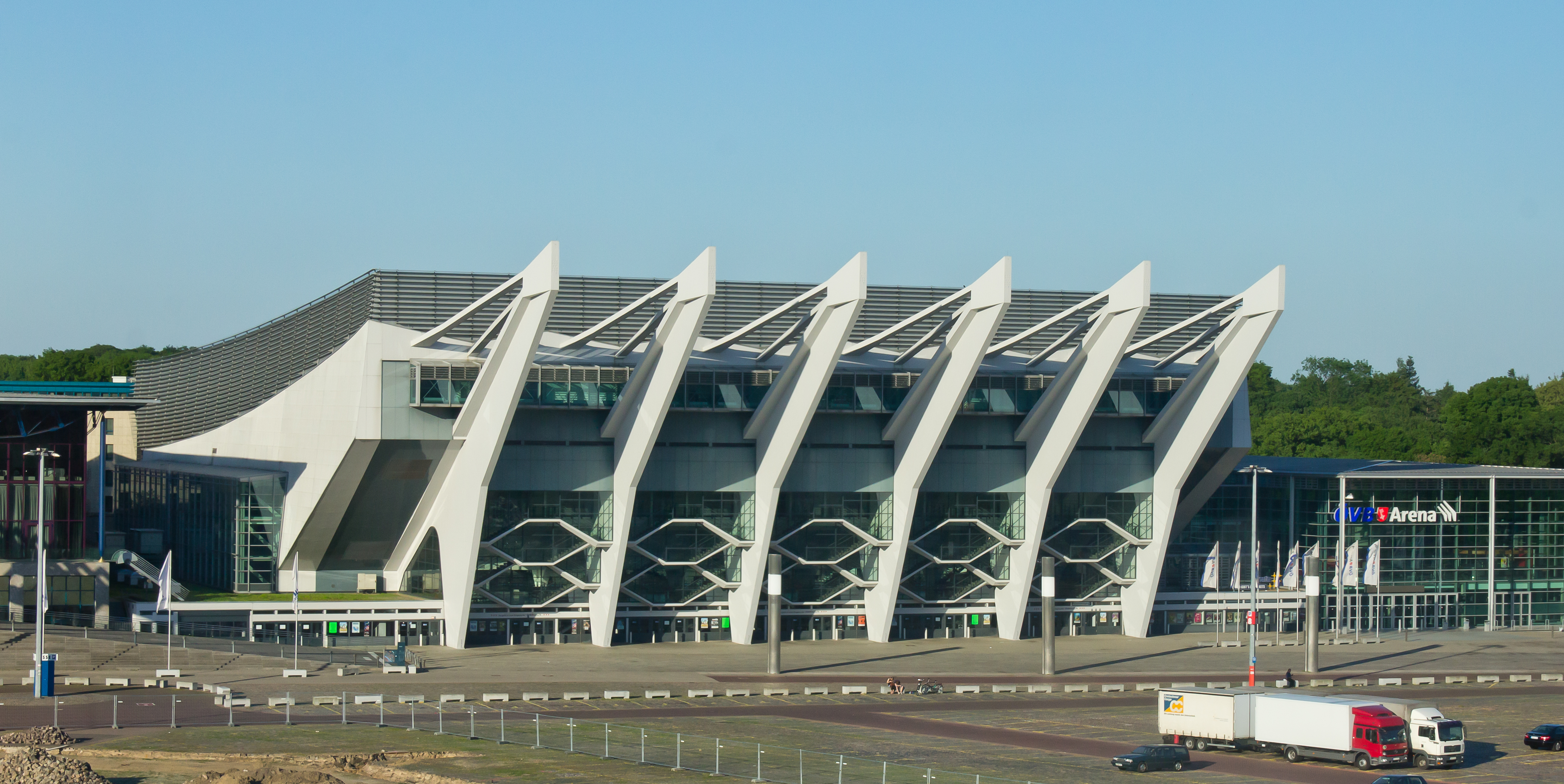
The Stadthalle in Bremen was the host venue of Countdown Grand Prix 1998

Countdown Grand Prix 1998 was the competition organised by NDR to select its entry for the Eurovision Song Contest 1998. Ten acts were selected by a panel consisting of representatives of NDR, which included head of the entertainment department Jürgen Meier-Beer, from proposals received by the broadcaster from record companies and producers and among the competing artists was Wind (with different group members) which represented Germany in 1985, in 1987, and in 1992.

The televised final took place on 26 February 1998 at the Stadthalle in Bremen, hosted by Axel Bulthaupt and Nena and broadcast on Das Erste. The winner, "Guildo hat euch lieb!" performed by Guildo Horn, was selected solely through public televoting. In addition to the performances of the competing entries, Nena performed her song "Was hast du mit meinem Traum gemacht", and Paul Oscar, who represented Iceland in 1997, performed his entry "Minn hinsti dans". The national final was watched by 7.73 million viewers in Germany and 689,402 votes were cast during the show.

Final – 26 February 1998
R/O	Artist	Song	Songwriter(s)	Televote	Place
1	Shana	"Es regnet nie in Texas"	Franz Troja, Klaus Hirschburger	Unknown	9
2	Ballhouse	"Can-Can"	Ralph Siegel, Bernd Meinunger	Unknown	6
3	Maria Perzil	"Freut Euch!"	Markus Krüger, Dirk Schelpmeier	Unknown	10
4	Diana and Wind	"Lass die Herzen sich berühren"	Peter Weigel, Dave Tchorz, Andreas Lebbing	Unknown	5
5	Sharon	"Kids"	Ralph Siegel, Bernd Meinunger	Unknown	8
6	Guildo Horn	"Guildo hat euch lieb!"	Alf Igel	426,050	1
7	Rosenstolz	"Herzensschöner"	Peter Plate, Andrea Rosenbaum	73,077	2
8	Köpenick	"Carneval"	Ralph Siegel, Bernd Meinunger	Unknown	7
9	Fokker	"Gel-Song (Kleine Melodie)"	Christian von Richthofen	Unknown	4
10	Hearts and Roses	"Du bist ein Teil von mir"	Jörg Evers	69,630	3

== At Eurovision ==
According to Eurovision rules, all nations with the exceptions of the eight countries which had obtained the lowest average number of points over the last five contests competed in the final on 9 May 1998. Germany was originally relegated for being one of the eight lowest scoring countries but was eventually allowed to compete after Italy withdrew from the contest. On 13 November 1997, an allocation draw was held which determined the running order and Germany was set to perform in position 9, following the entry from Israel and before the entry from Malta. The German conductor at the contest was Stefan Raab who composed "Guildo hat euch lieb!" under the pseudonym Alf Igel, and Guildo Horn performed on stage together with his band Die Orthopädischen Strümpfe. Germany finished in seventh place with 86 points.

In Germany, the show was broadcast on Das Erste, with commentary by Peter Urban. The show was watched by 12.67 million viewers in Germany. NDR appointed Nena as its spokesperson to announce the points awarded by the German televote.

=== Voting ===
Below is a breakdown of points awarded to Germany and awarded by Germany in the contest. The nation awarded its 12 points to Turkey in the contest.

Points awarded to Germany
Score	Country
12 points	Netherlands; Spain; Switzerland
10 points	Portugal
8 points	Ireland; Slovenia
7 points	Belgium
6 points	Romania; United Kingdom
5 points	
4 points	
3 points	Greece
2 points	
1 point	Estonia; Finland

Points awarded by Germany
Score	Country
12 points	Turkey
10 points	Croatia
8 points	Malta
7 points	Israel
6 points	Netherlands
5 points	Poland
4 points	Belgium
3 points	Norway
2 points	Ireland
1 point	United Kingdom
