= Curt Close =

Belgian musician (born 1975)

- Born: 23 October 1975 (age 51); Waremme, Belgium
- Genre: Pop
- Occupation: Singer-songwriter
- Instrument: Vocals

Curt Close is a Belgian singer-songwriter. At the age of ten, he began to play the piano. He composed his first song at the age of 14 and began to perform at small school concerts. When he was 19, he met Pierre Rapsat, a composer and performer who became his mentor and friend and with whom he would write several songs. Later on, an advertisement led to a meeting with Nicolas Varak, a producer in Paris who signed him up with East West (Warner Music France) for his first album, Le vent se lève, which came out in 2001.

In 2005, Close played the role of Merlin in Catherine Lara's musical comedy Graal, and he contributed vocals to the recording of the show, which was released the same year.

In 2007, Close formed the band Enfantsonic with Londoners Jonny & Archie Dyke.

== Discography ==
- Le vent se lève (2001)
