= Poland in the Eurovision Song Contest 1998 =

- Eurovision Song Contest 1998
- Participating broadcaster: Telewizja Polska (TVP)
- Country: Poland
- Selection process: Internal selection
- Announcement date: 30 March 1998

Competing entry
- Song: "To takie proste"
- Artist: Sixteen
- Songwriters: Jarosław Pruszkowski; Olga Pruszkowska

Placement
- Final result: 17th, 19 points

Participation chronology

Poland was represented at the Eurovision Song Contest 1998 with the song "To takie proste", composed by Jarosław Pruszkowski, with lyrics by Olga Pruszkowska, and performed by the band Sixteen. The Polish participating broadcaster, Telewizja Polska (TVP), internally selected its entry for the contest. The broadcaster announced the entry on 30 March 1998.

Poland competed in the Eurovision Song Contest which took place on 9 May 1998. Performing during the show in position 7, Poland placed seventeenth out of the 23 participating countries, scoring 19 points.

== Background ==
Prior to the 1998 contest, Telewizja Polska (TVP) had participated in the Eurovision Song Contest representing Poland four times since its first entry in 1994. Its highest placement in the contest, to this point, has been second place, achieved with its debut entry in 1994 with the song "To nie ja!" performed by Edyta Górniak.

As part of its duties as participating broadcaster, TVP organises the selection of its entry in the Eurovision Song Contest and broadcasts the event in the country. Having internally selected its entries since 1994, the broadcaster opted to continue selecting its entry via an internal selection for 1998.

== Before Eurovision ==
=== Internal selection ===
TVP selected its entry for the Eurovision Song Contest 1998 via an internal selection with record companies, artist managers and individual artists being directly invited to submit entries. The broadcaster received 45 submissions from 38 artists including De Su, Kasia Stankiewicz and Mietek Szcześniak, and a five-member selection committee, which among its members included composer Wojciech Trzciński and journalist Janusz Kosiński, reviewed the received submissions in February 1998 and selected the Polish entry. On 30 March 1998, a press conference took place at the TVP Headquarters in Warsaw where it was announced that the band Sixteen would represent Poland in the Eurovision Song Contest 1998 with the song "To takie proste", written by band members Jarosław Pruszkowski and Olga Pruszkowska.

Following the entry announcement, a group of Polish music producers protested against TVP's lack of clear rules for selecting their representative, as the regulations initially published by the broadcaster assumed the possibility of selecting the Polish entry through a national final. They also alleged that the selection of Sixteen was influenced by the fact that the son of committee member Wojciech Trzciński worked for the band's record company Poly Gram. Trzciński subsequently denied the allegations, explaining that Sixteen was selected in accordance with the contest regulations and that the level of submitted songs did not allow for a national final to be organised.

== At Eurovision ==
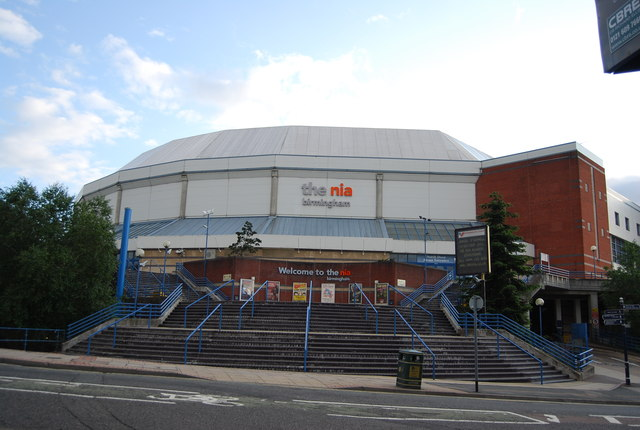
The Eurovision Song Contest 1998 took place at the National Indoor Arena in Birmingham, UK, on 9 May 1998.

According to Eurovision rules, all nations with the exceptions of the eight countries which had obtained the lowest average number of points over the last five contests competed in the final on 9 May 1998. On 13 November 1997, an allocation draw was held which determined the running order and Poland was set to perform in position 7, following the entry from Slovakia and before the entry from Israel. The Polish conductor at the contest was Wiesław Pieregorólka, and Poland finished in seventeenth place with 19 points.

The show was broadcast in Poland on TVP1 with commentary by Artur Orzech. TVP appointed Jan Chojnacki as its spokesperson to announced the results of the Polish televote during the show.

=== Voting ===
Below is a breakdown of points awarded to Poland and awarded by Poland in the contest. The nation awarded its 12 points in the contest to Belgium.

Points awarded to Poland
Score	Country
12 points	
10 points	Romania
8 points	
7 points	
6 points	
5 points	Germany
4 points	
3 points	
2 points	France; Hungary
1 point	

Points awarded by Poland
Score	Country
12 points	Belgium
10 points	Israel
8 points	Malta
7 points	United Kingdom
6 points	Croatia
5 points	Netherlands
4 points	Norway
3 points	Sweden
2 points	Ireland
1 point	Estonia
