= Turkey in the Eurovision Song Contest 1998 =

- Eurovision Song Contest 1998
- Participating broadcaster: Turkish Radio and Television Corporation (TRT)
- Country: Turkey
- Selection process: 21. Eurovision Şarkı Yarışması Türkiye Finali
- Selection date: 28 February 1998

Competing entry
- Song: "Unutamazsın"
- Artist: Tüzmen
- Songwriters: Erdinç Tunç; Canan Tunç

Placement
- Final result: 14th, 25 points

Participation chronology

Turkey was represented at the Eurovision Song Contest 1998 with the song "Unutamazsın", composed by Erdinç Tunç, with lyrics by Canan Tunç, and performed by Tüzmen. The Turkish participating broadcaster, the Turkish Radio and Television Corporation (TRT), selected its entry through a national final.

== Before Eurovision ==
=== 21. Eurovision Şarkı Yarışması Türkiye Finali ===
67 songs were submitted to the Turkish Radio and Television Corporation (TRT) that selected ten of them for the national final.

The final took place on 28 February 1998 at the TRT Studios in Ankara, hosted by Bülend Özveren and Ekin Olcayto. Ten songs competed and the winner was determined by an expert jury. One of the contestants, Şebnem Paker and her group, had performed in Eurovision Song Contest 1997 and had received the highest points for Turkey up to 1997, but in 1998 they couldn't repeat their previous success.

Final – 28 February 1998
R/O	Artist	Song	Lyricist	Composer	Conductor	Points	Place
1	Metropolis Sürgünleri	"Kayıp Aşk"	Semih Güneri	Semih Güneri	Semih Güneri	1	4
2	Tuğrul Arsever	"Oyna"	Sevingül Bahadır	Aslıgül Ayas	Timur Selçuk	2	2
3	Meltem Büyükuğurgör	"Soramadım"	Hakan Süersan	Hakan Süersan	Hakan Süersan	0	7
4	Pamela Spence	"Gökkuşağı"	İlter Yeşilay	Bilge Yüksel Dural	Ümit Eroğlu	0	7
5	Berk Özbek	"Serden Geçtiğim"	Çetin Akcan	Serpil Toparlak	Doğan Kospançalı	1	4
6	Kubat	"Dertli Saz"	Günay Çoban	Mete Aydın Çelik	Volkan Şanda	2	2
7	Tüzmen	"Unutamazsın"	Canan Tunç	Erdinç Tunç	Ümit Eroğlu	4	1
8	Şebnem Paker	"Çal"	Günay Çoban	Levent Çoker	Levent Çoker	1	4
9	Elçin Engin	"Yalan Aşklar"	Hale Turan	Şansal Engin	Ümit Eroğlu	0	7
10	Gözde Ural & Elif Özel	"Sevmek Zamanı"	Aylin Sarıkayalı	Mine Mucur	Sadun Ersönmez	0	7

== At Eurovision ==
On the night of the contest Tüzmen performed 24th in the running order, following Estonia and preceding Macedonia. At the close of the voting, Unutamazsın had received 25 points, placing Turkey 14th out of 25 contestants. The Turkish jury awarded its 12 points to the United Kingdom.

=== Voting ===
Points awarded to Turkey
Score	Country
12 points	Germany
10 points	
8 points	
7 points	
6 points	
5 points	Croatia; Macedonia
4 points	
3 points	
2 points	Romania
1 point	Netherlands

Points awarded by Turkey
Score	Country
12 points	United Kingdom
10 points	Malta
8 points	Ireland
7 points	Netherlands
6 points	Portugal
5 points	Israel
4 points	Croatia
3 points	Slovenia
2 points	Sweden
1 point	Belgium
