= Malta in the Eurovision Song Contest 1998 =

- Eurovision Song Contest 1998
- Participating broadcaster: Public Broadcasting Services (PBS)
- Country: Malta
- Selection process: National final
- Selection date: 7 February 1998

Competing entry
- Song: "The One That I Love"
- Artist: Chiara
- Songwriters: Jason Cassar; Sunny Aquilina

Placement
- Final result: 3rd, 165 points

Participation chronology

Malta was represented at the Eurovision Song Contest 1998 with the song "The One That I Love", composed by Jason Cassar, with lyrics by Sunny Aquilina, and performed by Chiara. The Maltese participating broadcaster, Public Broadcasting Services (PBS), selected its entry through a national final.

== Before Eurovision ==
=== National final ===
Public Broadcasting Services (PBS) held the national final on 6 and 7 February 1998 at the Mediterranean Conference Centre in Valletta, hosted by Angela Agius, John Demanuele, Denise Mintoff, and Patrick Vella. On the first night, 22 songs were presented, 6 of which were in a special category for newcomers to the contest. Those 6 were reduced to 4 after the first night, so that on the second night there were 20 songs. The 2 songs that were eliminated after the first night were "Come Back Home" performed by Rita Pace and "That Magic In Your Eyes" performed by Tonio Cuschieri. On the second night, all 20 finalists performed, and the winner was chosen by an expert jury.

R/O	Artist	Song	Points	Place
1	Claudette Pace and 6th Above	"Listen to Our Voices"	137	3
2	Orion	"Longing Dawn"	91	7
3	Marvic Lewis	"Voice in the Night"	113	4
4	Tarcisio Barbara	"How Can I Get Over You"	82	8
5	Fiona	"Same Time Tomorrow"	76	9
6	Miriam Christine	"It's Up to You"	102	5
7	Leontine	"Children of Mother Earth"	65	13
8	Fate	"Listen"	41	19
9	Natasha Grima	"Nights Alone"	53	16
10	Marisa D'Amato	"Love Will Be Your Light"	97	6
11	Olivia Lewis	"You're the One"	59	15
12	Karen Polidano	"Searching the Seas"	63	14
13	Vince Bongailas	"Unexplained"	28	20
14	Ivan Spiteri Lucas	"Playing with My Heart"	44	18
15	Enzo Gusman	"As Far as I Can See"	47	17
16	Catherine Vigar	"Give Love More Space"	69	11
17	Fabrizio Faniello	"More Than Just a Game"	142	2
18	Chiara	"The One That I Love"	164	1
19	Lawrence Gray	"Newborn Heart"	76	9
20	Georgina	"The Morning Rain"	68	12

Detailed Jury Votes
R/O	Song	Juror							Total
R/O	Song	1	2	3	4	5	6	7	Total
1	"Listen to Our Voices"	20	9	22	26	20	24	16	137
2	"Longing Dawn"	13	16	7	18	5	22	10	91
3	"Voice in the Night"	9	26	18	20	14	8	18	113
4	"How Can I Get Over You"	4	11	11	22	9	5	20	82
5	"Same Time Tomorrow"	18	20	8	3	10	13	4	76
6	"It's Up to You"	12	14	13	13	22	14	14	102
7	"Children of Mother Earth"	10	4	14	11	8	16	2	65
8	"Listen"	5	12	2	5	4	7	6	41
9	"Nights Alone"	14	5	4	9	12	1	8	53
10	"Love Will Be Your Light"	22	22	12	1	16	2	22	97
11	"You're the One"	8	6	5	14	6	9	11	59
12	"Searching the Seas"	7	7	6	12	2	20	9	63
13	"Unexplained"	1	18	1	2	1	4	1	28
14	"Playing with My Heart"	3	1	3	8	13	3	13	44
15	"As Far as I Can See"	2	2	9	16	3	12	3	47
16	"Give Love More Space"	11	13	20	7	7	6	5	69
17	"More Than Just a Game"	24	24	24	4	24	18	24	142
18	"The One That I Love"	26	10	26	24	26	26	26	164
19	"Newborn Heart"	16	3	16	6	18	10	7	76
20	"The Morning Rain"	6	8	10	10	11	11	12	68

== At Eurovision ==
The song received 165 points, finishing 3rd. This was Malta's best result along with 1992 up to that point.

=== Voting ===
Points awarded to Malta
Score	Country
12 points	Ireland; Norway; Slovakia; United Kingdom
10 points	Turkey
8 points	Belgium; Germany; Netherlands; Poland; Switzerland
7 points	Croatia; Hungary; Israel
6 points	France; Greece; Sweden
5 points	Cyprus; Estonia; Finland; Portugal; Spain
4 points	
3 points	Slovenia
2 points	
1 point	

Points awarded by Malta
Score	Country
12 points	Israel
10 points	Croatia
8 points	United Kingdom
7 points	Netherlands
6 points	Ireland
5 points	Norway
4 points	Sweden
3 points	Belgium
2 points	Portugal
1 point	Cyprus
