= Netherlands in the Eurovision Song Contest 1965 =

- Eurovision Song Contest 1965
- Participating broadcaster: Nederlandse Televisie Stichting (NTS)
- Country: Netherlands
- Selection process: Nationaal Songfestival 1965
- Selection date: 13 February 1965

Competing entry
- Song: "'t Is genoeg"
- Artist: Conny Vandenbos
- Songwriters: Johnny Holshuyzen; Joke van Soest

Placement
- Final result: 11th, 5 points

Participation chronology

The Netherlands was represented at the Eurovision Song Contest 1965 with the song "'t Is genoeg", composed by Johnny Holshuyzen, with lyrics by Karel Prior, and performed by Conny Vandenbos. The Dutch participating Broadcaster, Nederlandse Televisie Stichting (NTS), selected its entry through a national final.

Five acts participated in the Dutch preselection, which consisted of five qualifying rounds, followed by the final on 13 February. All the shows were held at the Theater Concordia in Bussum, hosted by the 1959 Eurovision winner Teddy Scholten. Vandenbos had previously taken part in the Dutch preselection of 1962. Future Dutch representative Ronnie Tober (1968) was one of the other participants.

== Before Eurovision ==
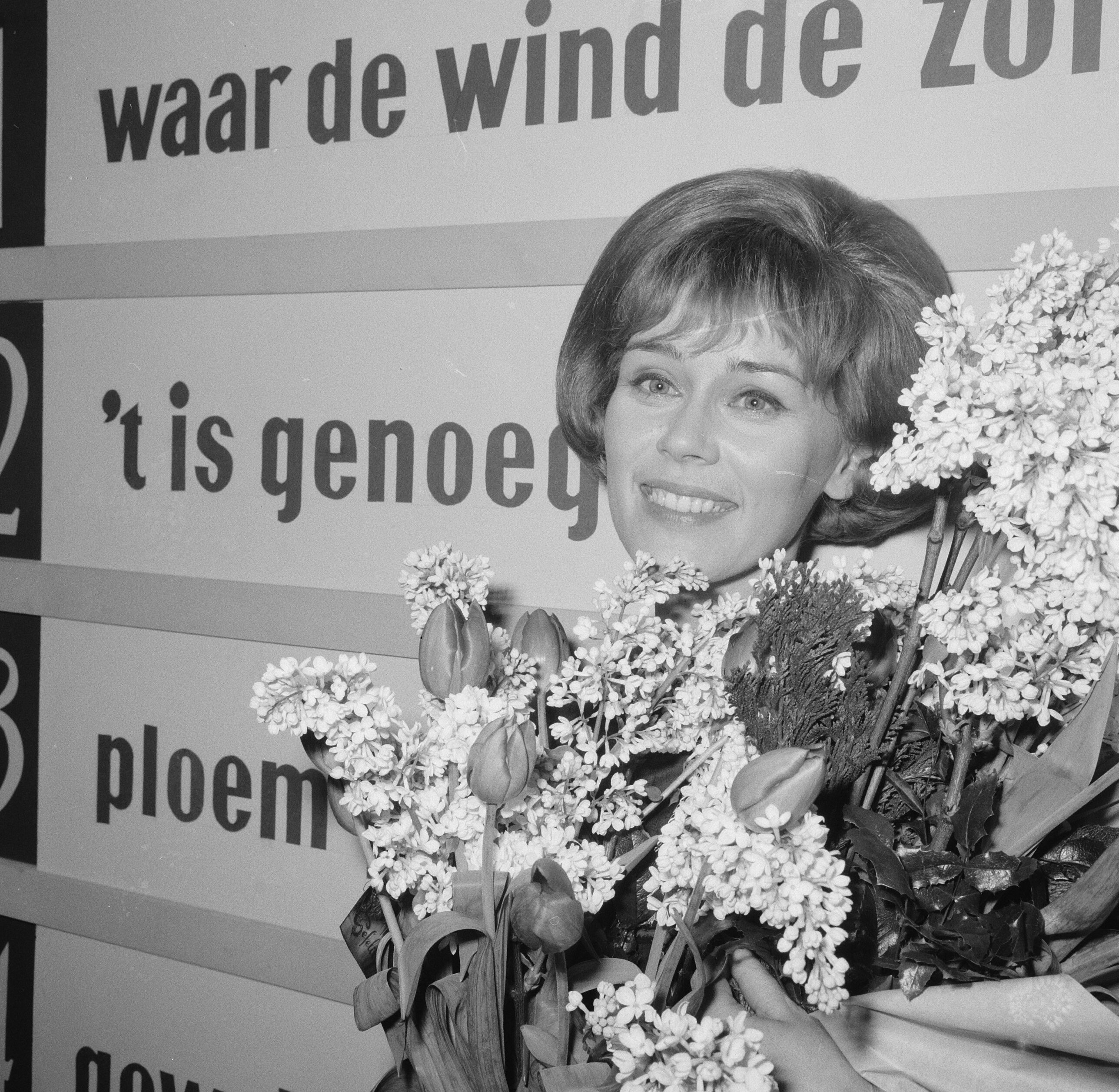
Connie Vandenbos was selected to represent Netherlands in 1965

=== Nationaal Songfestival 1965 ===
==== Heats ====
Five qualifying heats took place on consecutive evenings between 8 and 12 February. Each involved one of the selected acts performing three songs, with the jury winner from each act going forward to the final. The 31-member jury contained a mixture of journalists, employees of the organizing broadcaster, NTS, and randomly chosen audience members. The same format was used again in the Dutch preselections of 1966 and 1996. The NTS jury consisted of Jany Bron, Pim Jacobs, Lex Karsemeijer, Co de Kloet, Kitty Knappert, Ton Kool, Frans Muriloff, Leo Nelissen, Bep Ogterop, Tonny Schiferstein, and Skip Voogd.

Heat 1 – Trea Dobbs – 8 February 1965
R/O	Song	Songwriters		Press jury	NTS jury	Public vote	Total	Place
R/O	Song	Composer	Lyricist	Press jury	NTS jury	Public vote	Total	Place
1	"Stad"	Rudy van Houten	Gerrit den Braber	4	2	6	12	2
2	"Ploem ploem jenka"	Pieter Goemans		4	7	5	16	1
3	"Kijk maar niet om"	Joop Portengen	Gerrit den Braber	2	1	0	3	3

The detailed results of Ronnie Tober's semifinal are currently unknown.

Heat 2 – Ronnie Tober – 9 February 1965
R/O	Song	Songwriters		Total	Place
R/O	Song	Composer	Lyricist	Total	Place
1	"Geweldig"	Pieter Goemans		16	1
2	"Kip in het water"	Hans Peters		4	3
3	"Een lied wordt oud"	Pi Scheffer	Louis Dusee; Pieter Goemans	11	2

Heat 3 – Conny Vandenbos – 10 February 1965
R/O	Song	Songwriters		Press jury	NTS jury	Public vote	Total	Place
R/O	Song	Composer	Lyricist	Press jury	NTS jury	Public vote	Total	Place
1	"Laat me alleen"	Bert Paige	Fred Kaps; Joke van Soest	6	2	1	9	2
2	"'t Is genoeg"	Johnny Holshuyzen	Joke van Soest	4	6	3	13	1
3	"Van de week"	Bert Paige	Willy van Hemert	0	2	7	9	2

Heat 4 – Gert Timmerman – 11 February 1965
R/O	Song	Songwriters		Press jury	NTS jury	Public vote	Total	Place
R/O	Song	Composer	Lyricist	Press jury	NTS jury	Public vote	Total	Place
1	"Jij bent het lichtpunt in mijn leven"	Joop Portengen	Gerrit den Braber	2	6	8	11	2
2	"Alleen"	Ger Rensen	Fred Gaasbeek; P. Zoll	1	1	2	4	3
3	"Waar de wind de zomer vindt"	P. Dertien	M. Schwarzmann; P. Zoll	7	3	1	16	1

Heat 5 – Shirley – 12 February 1965
R/O	Song	Songwriters		Press jury	NTS jury	Public vote	Total	Place
R/O	Song	Composer	Lyricist	Press jury	NTS jury	Public vote	Total	Place
1	"Blijf bij mij"	Shirley		3	6	9	18	1
2	"Als een vlinder"	Joop Portengen	Gerrit den Braber	5	3	2	10	2
3	"Requiem voor een clown"	Pieter Goemans		2	1	0	3	3

==== Final ====
The national final was held on 13 February. The winning song was again chosen by a mixed 31-member jury, each awarding 1 point to their favourite song. The winner was "'t Is genoeg", written by Johnny Holshuyzen, composed by Joke van Soest, and performed Conny Vandenbos, who won by a 5-point margin.

Final – 13 February 1965
R/O	Artist	Song	Press jury	NTS jury	Public vote	Points	Place
1	Gert Timmerman	"Waar de wind de zomer vindt"	0	0	1	1	5
2	Conny Vandenbos	"'t Is genoeg"	4	5	4	13	1
3	Trea Dobbs	"Ploem ploem jenka"	3	3	0	6	3
4	Ronnie Tober	"Geweldig"	1	2	5	8	2
5	Shirley	"Blijf bij mij"	2	0	1	3	4

== At Eurovision ==
On the night of the final Vandenbos performed first in the running order, preceding the United Kingdom. Voting was by each national jury awarding 5-3-1 to its top three songs, and at the close of the voting "'t Is genoeg" had received 5 points (all from Norway), placing the Netherlands 11th of the 18 entries. The Dutch jury awarded its 5 points to contest winners Luxembourg.

The Dutch conductor at the contest was Dolf van der Linden.

The Dutch jury included Annie Bosma-Banning, Kitty Knappert, and Frans Boelen.

=== Voting ===
Points awarded to the Netherlands
Score	Country
5 points	Norway
3 points	
1 point	

Points awarded by the Netherlands
Score	Country
5 points	Luxembourg
3 points	Italy
1 point	France
