= Martin Koch (orchestrator) =

- Occupation(s): Conductor, Arranger, Producer
- Education: Royal College of Music
- Awards: Drama Desk Award for Outstanding Orchestrations; Tony Award for Best Orchestrations

Martin Koch is a British music supervisor, orchestrator, conductor, and composer who won the 2009 Drama Desk Award for Outstanding Orchestrations and was a co-winner of the 2009 Tony Award for Best Orchestrations for Billy Elliot the Musical, sharing the honor with Michael Starobin and Tom Kitt of Next to Normal.

== Life ==
Koch studied at the Royal College of Music. He has served as the musical supervisor for numerous productions, including Cats, Moby Dick, Chicago, Blondel, Follies, and Into the Woods in the West End; several international tours of Les Misérables; and the United Kingdom tour of Martin Guerre.

Koch made his Broadway debut as the musical director for Shirley Bassey in 1986. He orchestrated and arranged the music for Mamma Mia!, which garnered him his first Tony nomination, prior to Billy Elliot.

He was the musical director of the 1998 Eurovision Song Contest, the final edition of the contest to date with a full orchestra present. Koch conducted the BBC Concert Orchestra for the intro music, the interval act "Jupiter, the Bringer of Joviality," and the French entry, "Où aller" by Marie Line, which initially was performed entirely to a backing track before the decision was made to incorporate the orchestra's string section. Thus, although it saved Koch from being one of the handful of Eurovision musical directors who didn't actually conduct any competing entry, he also didn't take the customary conductor's bow prior to the French performance.

Koch has recorded numerous albums, including Les Misérables: The Complete Symphonic Recording and original cast recordings of Hey, Mr. Producer!, Oliver!, and Miss Saigon.

Koch recently orchestrated five operas by Richard Thomas, a project commissioned by the BBC. He and collaborator Nick Gilpin own and operate a music production company that has been responsible for numerous television programs and several recordings, including Jerry Springer: The Opera.

Preceded by (Republic of Ireland) Frank McNamara	Eurovision Song Contest conductor 1998	Succeeded by
