= Goemans =

Goemans is a surname. Notable people with the surname include:

- Michel Goemans, mathematician at MIT
- Pieter Goemans, Dutch composer
