= Aan de Amsterdamse grachten =

1949 dutch song by Pieter Goemans

- The song's first released recording, by Hans and Nan Boskamp

Song by Hans and Nan Boskamp
- Language: Dutch
- Written: 1949
- Recorded: 1956
- Genre: Traditional pop
- Label: Imperial
- Songwriter: Pieter Goemans

Aan de Amsterdamse grachten (Dutch pronunciation: [ˈaːn də ʔɑmstərˌdɑmsə ˈɣrɑxtə(n)]; "At the Amsterdam canals") is a Dutch song by Pieter Goemans. It was written in 1949 but not recorded until 1956, and many times more since then. It is one of the standard songs celebrating the city of Amsterdam and one of the best-known and most popular songs in the Netherlands.

== Structure and content ==
"Aan de Amsterdamse grachten" lyrics

Aan de Amsterdamse grachten
heb ik heel mijn hart voor altijd verpand.
Amsterdam vult mijn gedachten,
als de mooiste stad in ons land.
Al die Amsterdamse mensen,
al die lichtjes 's avonds laat op het plein.
Niemand kan zich beter wensen
dan een Amsterdammer te zijn.

("To the Amsterdam canals
I have given my heart for ever;
Amsterdam fills my mind
as the most beautiful city of our country.
All those Amsterdam people,
all those lights late at night on the square.
No one could wish for anything better
than to be an Amsterdammer")

The song is a waltz, in 3/4 time. Typical accompaniment is the accordion. The first verse recounts a childhood experience in the house of the grandparents, a house now occupied by other people and partly converted to office space. The second explains that after having traveled widely the speaker still longs to return to the city "on the Amstel and the IJ". A transitional verse suggests that the trees, high above traffic, and the boats on the water are unchanged. According to the refrain, the speaker has given his heart to the Amsterdam canals; Amsterdam fills his thoughts, and nothing could be better than to be an Amsterdammer.

== History ==
Goemans was inspired to write the song in 1949 while walking across the bridge where the Prinsengracht and Leidsegracht canals intersect. It wasn't set to sheet music or recorded until 1956, when an arrangement was written by pianist Dick Schallies (then a member of the Metropole Orkest), because, as Schallies explained, Goemans couldn't write music. Schallies denies rumors that Enrico Neckheim was responsible for the music. Goemans published the song under a pseudonym, Peter Shott; he was a diplomat's son and his father only allowed him to be associated with the popular music industry if he did so under an assumed name.

Henk Visscher, a singer, guitarist and bassist with John Kraaijkamp Sr., was the first to sing and record the song, though other sources state that Kraaijkamp sang it first, in the Café de Paris near the Leidseplein. In 2006, Visscher, a friend of Goemans from the cafe, explained that he had been asked to record a demo for the song the morning after Goemans and Schallies had finally put music to the lyrics, with Schallies playing piano. Goemans had wanted Kraaijkamp, but knew better than to call him early in the morning; he called Visscher, since he did not drink.

The first recording that was released was made in 1956 by singer and footballer Hans Boskamp in a duet with his wife Nan; the spelling on that recording is the old-fashioned "Amsterdamsche". A page dedicated to the song on the website of the Amsterdam City Archives contains that first released recording. Another notable artists of the 1950s and 1960s to record the song is Tante Leen.

Of all renditions, Wim Sonneveld's in 1962 is probably the best known. It was covered by foreigners as well, including the Belgian singer Louis Neefs, and by experimental jazz musician Willem Breuker. More recent versions were made by Huub van der Lubbe and André Rieu.

== Legacy ==
After his death in 2000, Goeman's ashes were spread over the Prinsengracht. A plaque is affixed to the bridge, commemorating the place of inspiration for the song, and in 2008, the bridge was named for him.

The annual Prinsengrachtconcert is traditionally closed with a (classical) rendition of the song. The carillon of the Westertoren plays the song every half hour on Tuesday; on a list of the top 100 Dutch songs compiled by the Amsterdam newspaper Het Parool, the song holds first place.
