= Dawn Martin =

Irish singer

- Born: 1976 (age 49–50); Dundalk, County Louth, Ireland
- Genre: Easy listening
- Occupations: Singer, hairdresser

Dawn Martin (born 1976 in Dundalk) is an Irish singer. She represented Ireland in the Eurovision Song Contest 1998.

== Career and Eurovision ==
Dawn Martin left school at the age of 14 and began working as a hairdresser. Being the eldest of eight children, she helped her parents to raise the family. In 1996 Martin had been asked to sing at a friend's wedding and was persuaded by the band to enter a local talent contest. Although working full-time as a hairdresser, Martin continued singing and became a member of a local cabaret band called Us, who performed at weddings and local pubs. In 1997 Martin appeared on The George Jones Show on BBC Radio Ulster and was heard by Gerry Morgan, who invited Martin to perform his song "Is Always Over Now?".

After winning the Irish National heats, she won the right to represent Ireland with "Is Always Over Now?". However this result gained some controversy from Louis Walsh, whose act The Carter Twins were beaten, when he labelled the singer "an amateur". The Carter Twins song had been composed by Ronan Keating and was favourite to win. There was further minor controversy when her two backing singers were axed by RTÉ before the final. These were friends of Martin's, but RTÉ decided that they needed more experienced singers, former winner Paul Harrington being chosen as one of them. In the lead up to the contest, Martin was ranked as 10 to 1 by bookmakers, but had been more favourably viewed by journalists, who predicted that singing in English would be an advantage with this being the first year that the contest was to include televotes. On the night of the Contest, Martin performed 13th and received 64 points, finishing in ninth place. The single reached No.24 in the Irish singles chart.

In 2011 Dawn appeared at Eurobash at Panti Bar in Dublin singing "Is Always Over Now?".

Awards and achievements
Preceded by Marc Roberts with "Mysterious Woman"	Ireland in the Eurovision Song Contest; 1998	Succeeded by The Mullans with "When You Need Me"
