= Fanny (singer) =

French singer (1979–2025)

- Born: Fanny Biascamano; 16 September 1979; Sète, Occitania, France
- Died: 27 December 2025 (aged 46) Sète, Occitania, France
- Genres: Pop
- Occupation: Singer
- Years active: 1991–2025
- Website: Official site

Fanny Biascamano (16 September 1979 – 27 December 2025), known as Fanny, was a French singer. She was born in Sète in the department of Hérault, France.

== Life and career ==
Fanny became known in 1991 by participating at the age of 12 in the "Numéro 1 de demain" ('Number 1 of Tomorrow') segment of the television show Sacrée Soirée hosted by Jean-Pierre Foucault on TF1. Her performance of Édith Piaf's rock hit "L'Homme à la moto" allowed her to release her first single. It became a top seven hit in France and earned a gold record.

The same year, she released her first album, entitled Fanny, and her second single, "Un poète disparu". In 1993, she released her second album, Chanteuse populaire, written in part by Didier Barbelivien, but its success was more modest.

In 1997, she was chosen to represent France at the Eurovision Song Contest in Dublin with the song Sentiments songes. She placed seventh with 95 points.

Fanny died from cancer on 27 December 2025 at the age of 46.

== Discography ==
=== Albums ===
- 1992: Fanny
- 1993: Chanteuse populaire

=== Singles ===
- 1991: "L'Homme à la moto"
- 1992: "Un poète disparu"
- 1992: "On s'écrit"
- 1993: "Halo"
- 1994: "Solo myself”

Preceded by Dan Ar Braz & l'Héritage des Celtes with Diwanit bugale	France in the Eurovision Song Contest; 1997	Succeeded by Marie Line with Où aller
