= Leidsegracht =

Canal in Amsterdam

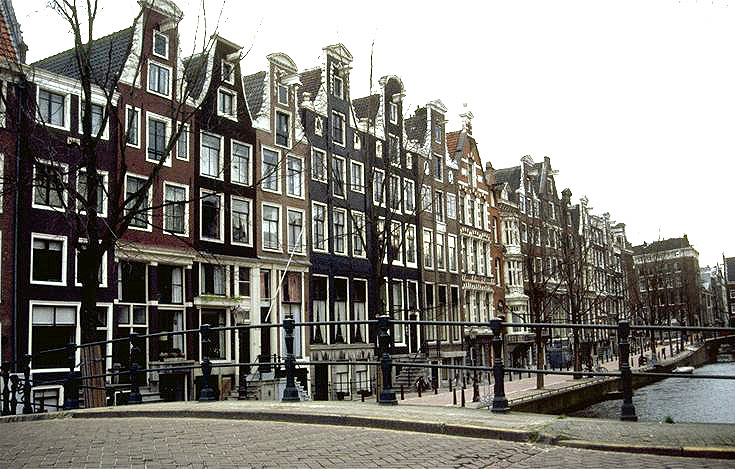
- Leidsegracht

- Location of Leidsegracht (dark blue)
- Length: .5 kilometres (0.31 mi)
- Location: Amsterdam
- Postal code: 1016
- Coordinates: 52.366389°N 4.883611°E
- East end: Herengracht
- To: Singelgracht

Construction
- Construction start: 17th century

The Leidsegracht (Dutch pronunciation: [ˈlɛitsəˌɣrɑxt]) is a canal in Amsterdam, Netherlands. It is a cross-canal in Amsterdam-Center that connects Herengracht, Keizersgracht, Prinsengracht and Lijnbaansgracht and flows into the Singelgracht at Marnixstraat.

== History ==
The Leidsegracht was part of the Expansion of Amsterdam and marked the border between the first and the second phase of the construction of the Grachtengordel (canal belt). Between 1615 and 1658, the Leidsegracht was the southern boundary of the city. The canal got its name in 1658 and is named after the city of Leiden.

Cornelis Lely (1854–1929), the hydraulic engineer, governor and minister who made the original plans for the reclamation of the Zuiderzee, was born on Leidsegracht no. 39. He is depicted on a gable stone between the Zuiderzee and the new IJsselmeer.

Pieter Goemans was inspired to write the classic song Aan de Amsterdamse grachten (On the Amsterdam canals) in 1949 while walking across the bridge where the Prinsengracht and the Leidsegracht intersect.

Almost all canal houses and former warehouses on this canal are now houses.

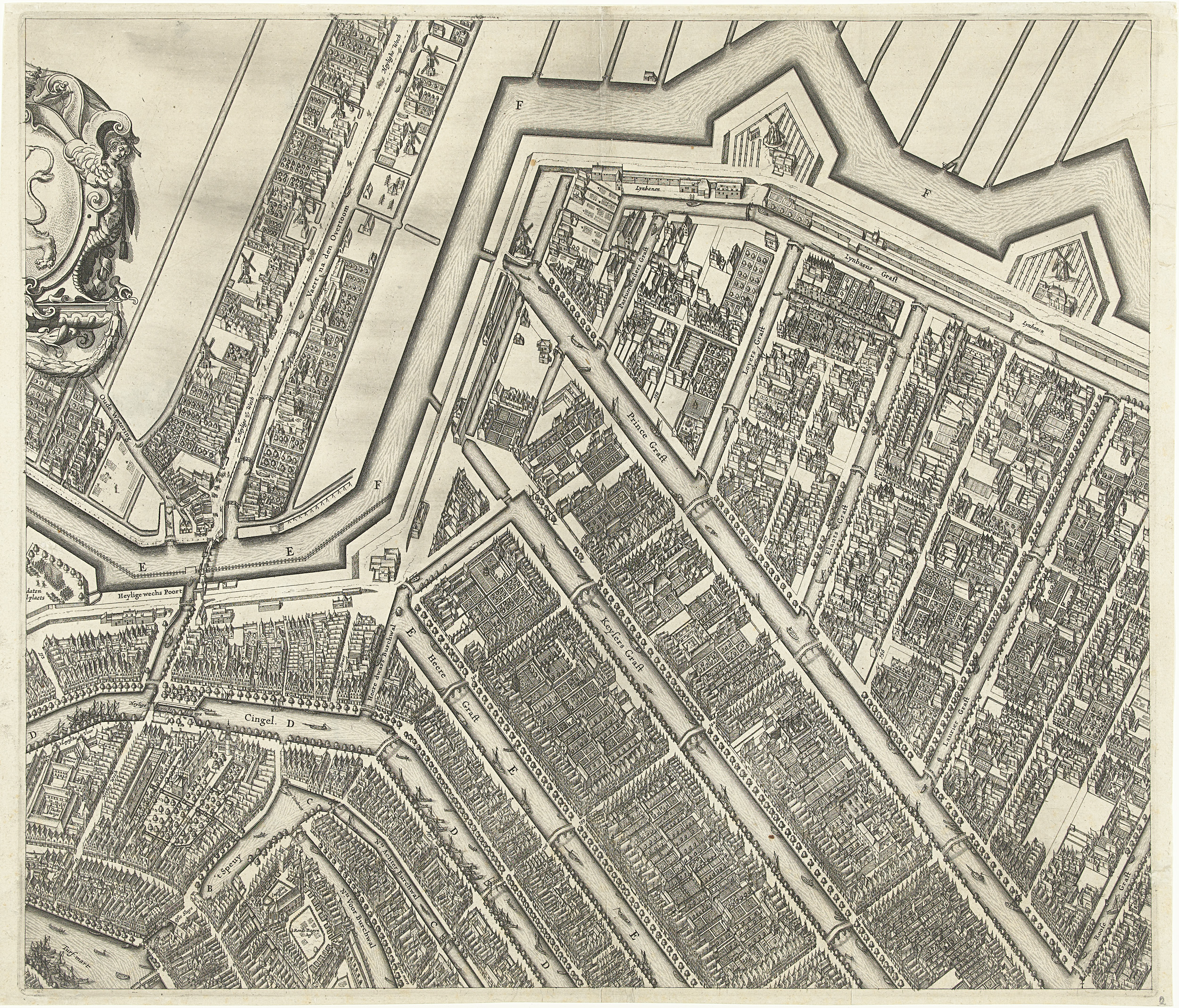
Map of Amsterdam by Balthasar van Berckenrode (1625). Shows Leidsegracht as the boundary of the buildings at the time, with the still short Prinsengracht (Prince Graft), ending at the Leidsegracht (top center).

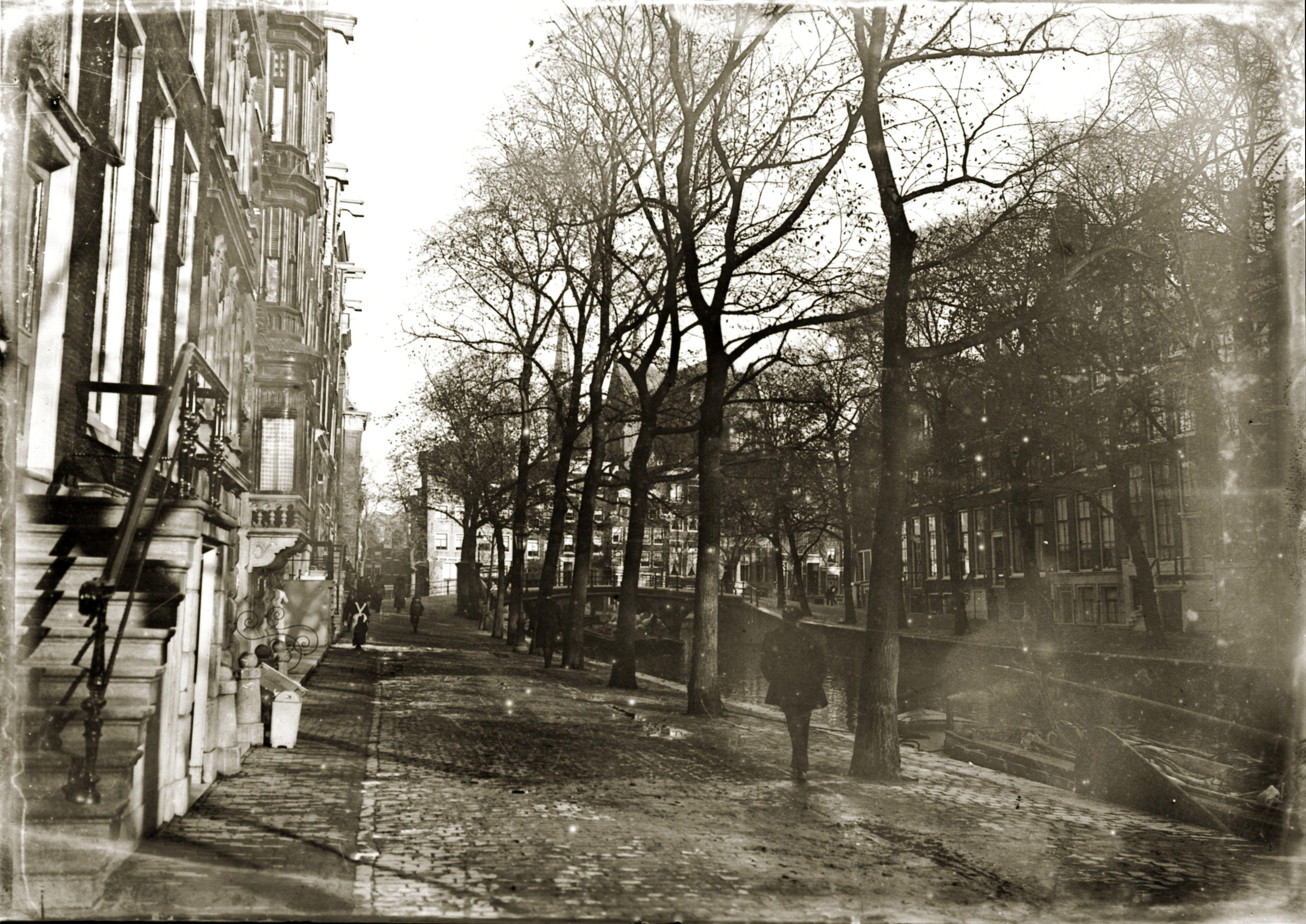
Leidsegracht 2-22 c. 1904

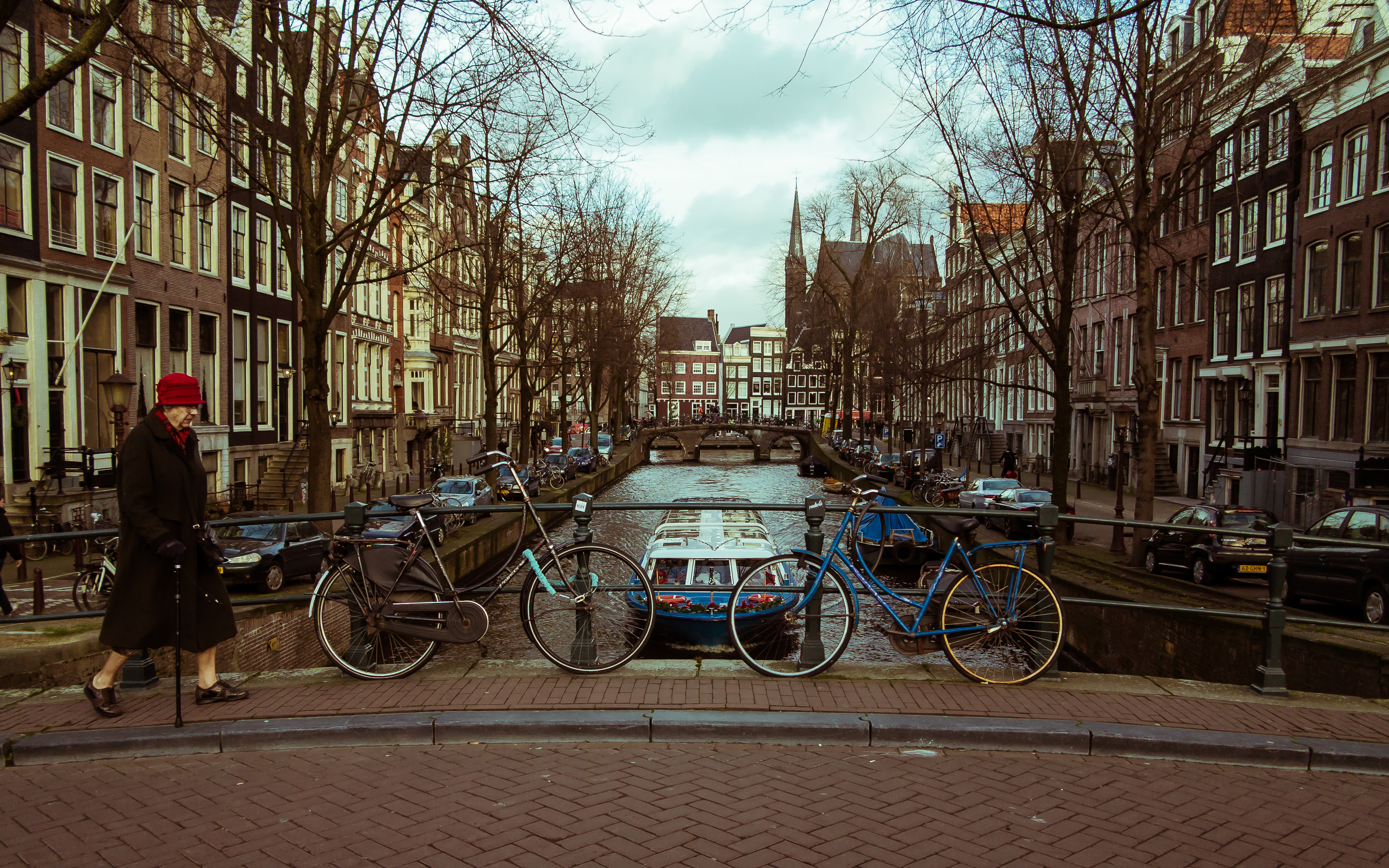
View of the canal

== See also ==
- Canals of Amsterdam
