= Conny Vandenbos =

Dutch singer

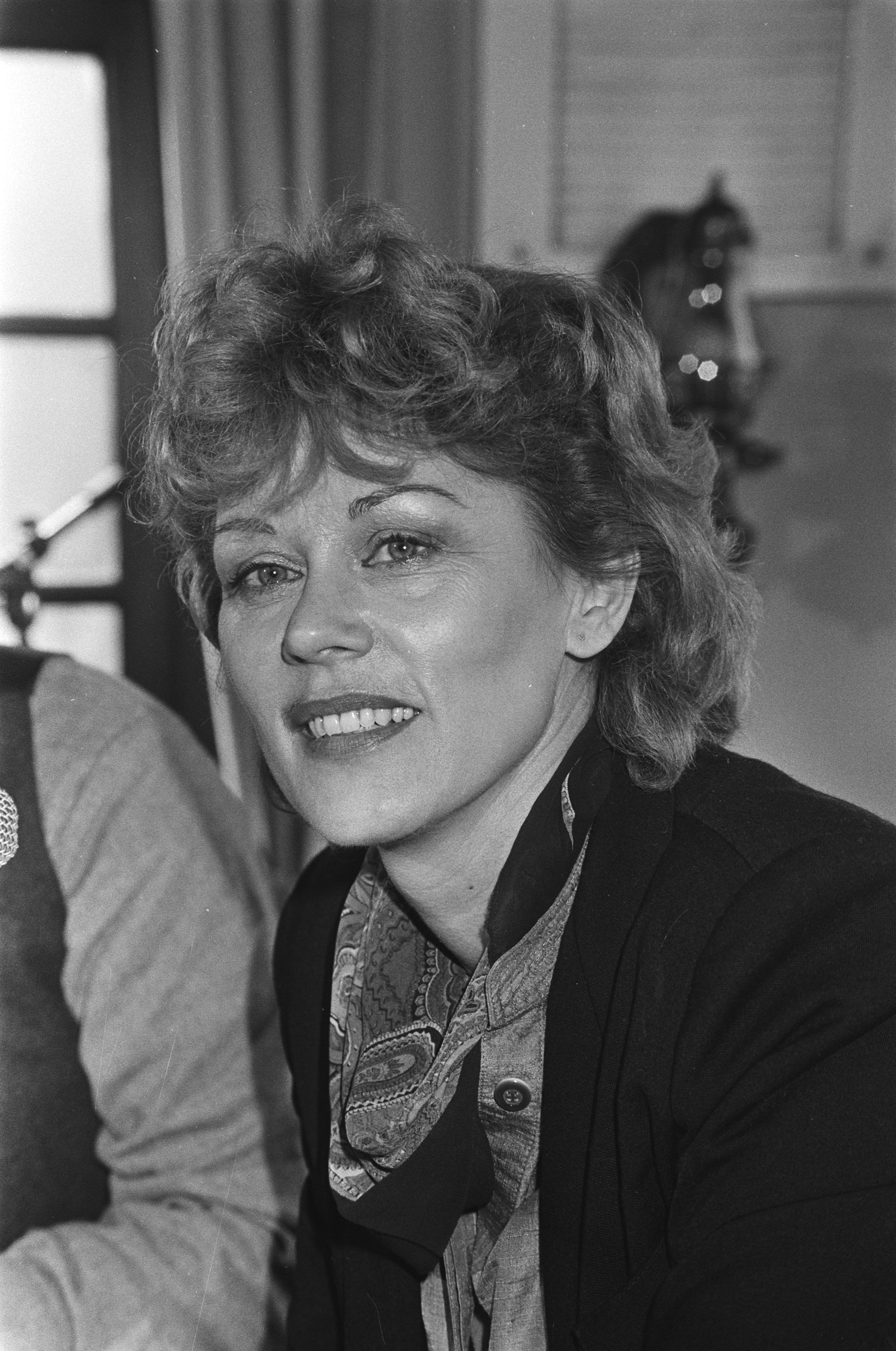
- Vandenbos in 1981

Background information
- Born: Jacoba Adriana Hollestelle; 16 January 1937; The Hague, Netherlands
- Died: 7 April 2002 (aged 65) Amsterdam, Netherlands
- Occupation: Singer
- Website: www.connyvandenbos.com

Jacoba Adriana "Conny" Hollestelle (formerly van den Bos; 16 January 1937 – 7 April 2002), known professionally as Conny Vandenbos, was a popular Dutch singer. She had her first radio hit in 1966 and continued to make hit recordings throughout the 1970s. She represented the Netherlands in the Eurovision Song Contest 1965 with the song "'t Is genoeg".

== Career ==
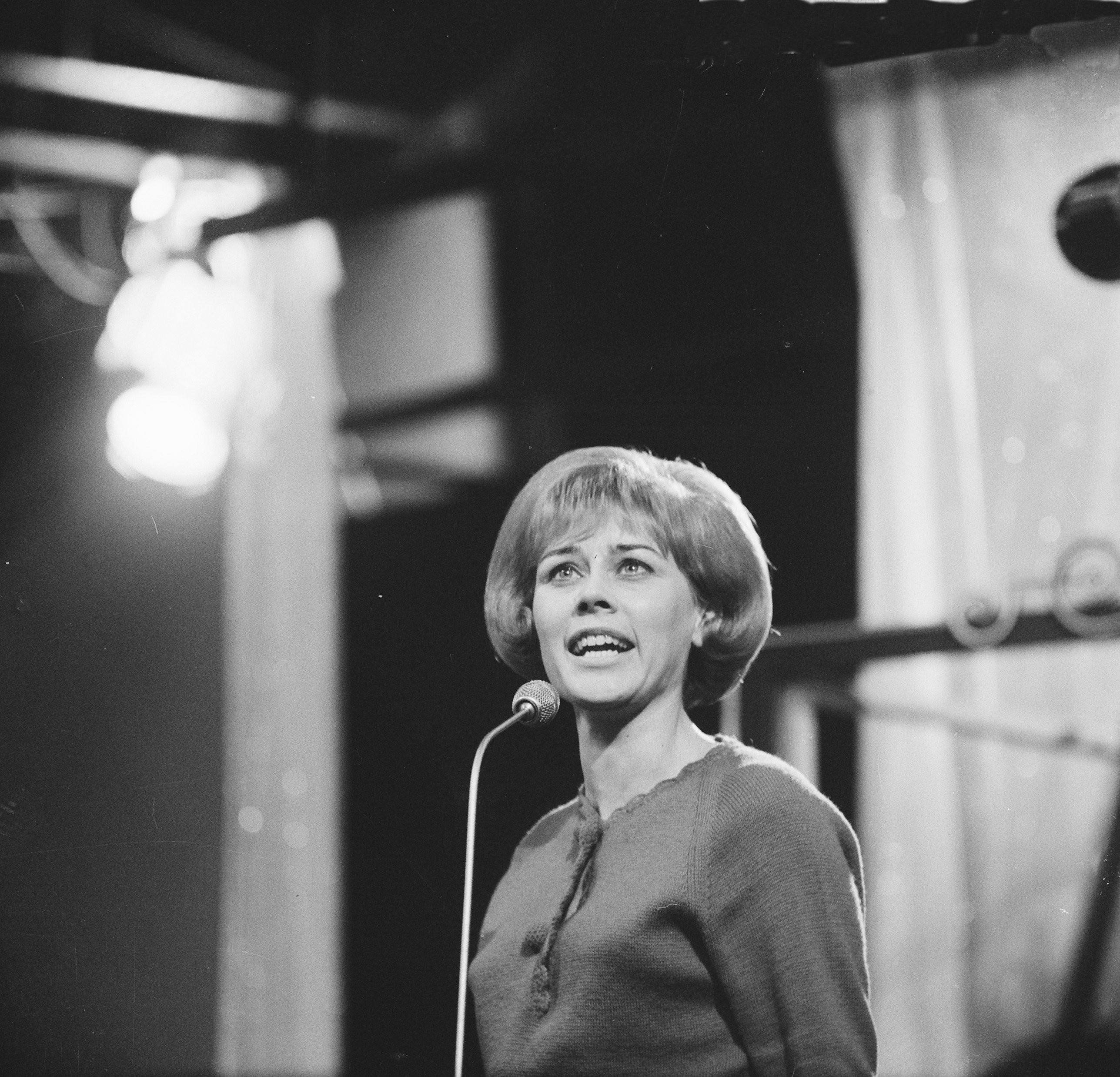
Vandenbos at the Nationaal Songfestival in 1965

Vandenbos made her solo debut in the KRO radio programme Springplank, a showcase for young talent, in which she performed French chansons. After her performance at the Belgian Knokkefestival in 1961, Conny signed a recording contract with Philips. In 1964, she made a television series Zeg maar Conny ("Call me Conny") for the Dutch public broadcaster NCRV.

She represented the Netherlands in the Eurovision Song Contest 1965 with the song "'t Is genoeg", finishing in eleventh place. One year later, Vandenbos finally achieved chart success with her first hit single, "Ik ben gelukkig zonder jou".

In 1974, Conny parted company from Philips and signed with Basart Records. During her contract at Basart, several albums were released, such as Een vrouw van deze tijd and Zo wil ik leven. A number of her singles, "Sjakie van de hoek", "Drie zomers lang" and "Ome Arie", charted on the Dutch pop charts. During this period, many of her hits were Dutch translations of foreign songs including her highest charting song "Een roosje, m'n roosje", which was a translation of "Daisy a Day" by Jud Strunk. She also released a German version of the song. In 1980, while back with Philips Records, Conny released an album of songs by Janis Ian titled Conny Vandenbos zingt Janis Ian. A duet with Janis Ian, "Don't Leave Tonight", reached number 17 in the Dutch charts in December 1980.

In 1976, she received an Edison Golden Harp for the album Zo wil ik leven. In 1993, she was awarded a gold disc for her album De 14 grootste hits van Conny Vandenbos. In the 1990s, her singing career was put on hold due to lack of record sales and to her other activities, such as hosting radio shows at various national and regional radio stations (Radio Noordzee and Radio West). Vandenbos presented the Dutch televoting result at the Eurovision Song Contest 1998. In 2000, she was honoured with a tile in the Rotterdam Walk of Fame.

== Personal life ==
In 1959, Conny married Wim van den Bos. The couple had a daughter. In 1965, this marriage ended, but since she was now known under the name Conny van den Bos, she decided to keep that name. However, the name was now written together as Conny Vandenbos. She now considered this a stage name, no longer the name of her ex-husband. Her second marriage was to Ger Faber, bass player of the band Leedy Trio, with whom she had one son.

In 1971, Vandenbos moved to Hoevelaken, Gelderland. Conny Vandenbos died in Amsterdam on 7 April 2002, two weeks after it was announced that she was suffering from lung cancer.

Awards and achievements
Preceded by Anneke Grönloh with "Jij bent mijn leven"	Netherlands in the Eurovision Song Contest; 1965	Succeeded by Milly Scott with "Fernando en Filippo"
