= Sixteen (Polish band) =

Polish band

Sixteen was a Polish band, which was founded in 1997 and disbanded in 2004. Renata Dąbkowska is its lead singer, and it represented Poland in the Eurovision Song Contest 1998.

Their debut album "Lawa" (Lava) was released in 1997.

During the later part of 1998, the band became known as Seventeen and sometimes Sixteen-Seventeen.

== Sixteen at Eurovision ==
Sixteen represented Poland in the Eurovision Song Contest 1998. They performed the song "To takie proste" in the final of the competition on May 9 in Birmingham, United Kingdom, finishing 17th of 25 entrants.

== Group Members ==
- Renata Dąbkowska - vocals
- Jarosław Pruszkowski - guitar
- Janusz Witaszek - bass guitar
- Tomasz Stryczniewicz - percussion
- Mirosław Hoduń - keyboard

additions for Seventeen:

- Grzegorz Kloc - vocals, guitar
- Olga Pruszkowska - violin, background vocals

Awards and achievements
Preceded by Anna Maria Jopek with "Ale jestem"	Poland in the Eurovision Song Contest; 1998	Succeeded by Mietek Szcześniak with "Przytul mnie mocno"
