= Spain in the Eurovision Song Contest 1999 =

- Eurovision Song Contest 1999
- Participating broadcaster: Televisión Española (TVE)
- Country: Spain
- Selection process: Internal selection
- Announcement date: 10 March 1999

Competing entry
- Song: "No quiero escuchar"
- Artist: Lydia
- Songwriters: Fernando Rodríguez Fernández; Alejandro Piqueras Ramírez; Carlos López González; Adolfo Carmona Zamarreño

Placement
- Final result: 23rd, 1 point

Participation chronology

Spain was represented at the Eurovision Song Contest 1999 with the song "No quiero escuchar" written by Adolfo Carmona Zamarreno, Carlos López González, Alejandro Piqueras Ramírez and Fernando Rodríguez Fernández, and performed by Lydia. The Spanish participating broadcaster, Televisión Española (TVE), selected internally both the song and the performer, who were announced on 10 March 1999.

The song competed in the Eurovision Song Contest which took place on 29 May 1999. Performed during the show in position 3, it placed twenty-third (last) out of the 23 participating songs from different countries with one point.

== Background ==
Prior to the 1999 contest, Televisión Española (TVE) had participated in the Eurovision Song Contest representing Spain thirty-eight times since its first entry in 1961. It has won the contest on two occasions: in 1968 with the song "La, la, la" performed by Massiel and in 1969 with the song "Vivo cantando" performed by Salomé, the latter having won in a four-way tie with France, the Netherlands, and the United Kingdom. It has also finished second four times, with "En un mundo nuevo" by Karina in 1971, "Eres tú" by Mocedades in 1973, "Su canción" by Betty Missiego in 1979, and "Vuelve conmigo" by Anabel Conde in 1995. In 1998, it placed sixteenth with the song "¿Qué voy a hacer sin ti?" performed by Mikel Herzog.

As part of its duties as participating broadcaster, TVE organises the selection of its entry in the Eurovision Song Contest and broadcasts the event in the country. TVE selected in 1998 both the artist and song that would compete at the Eurovision Song Contest via an internal selection. The procedure was continued in order to select their 1999 entry.

== Before Eurovision ==
=== Internal selection ===
On 10 March 1999, TVE announced that they had internally selected Lydia as its representative in Jerusalem. It was also revealed that she would sing the song "No quiero escuchar", written by Adolfo Carmona Zamarreno, Carlos López González, Alejandro Piqueras Ramírez, and Fernando Rodríguez Fernández and selected from more than seventy entries received from record labels. Prior to the entry announcement, Esmeralda Grao (with the song "Aquí"), Irene and Chelo, Malú, M.O.M. and Rosario Mohedano (with the song "Lere lele") were speculated by the Spanish press to have been selected by TVE for the 1999 contest. To promote "No quiero escuchar" as the Spanish Eurovision entry, Lydia filmed a music video for the song in Milan and performed during the La Primera television programmes Hyakutake and Música sí.

== At Eurovision ==
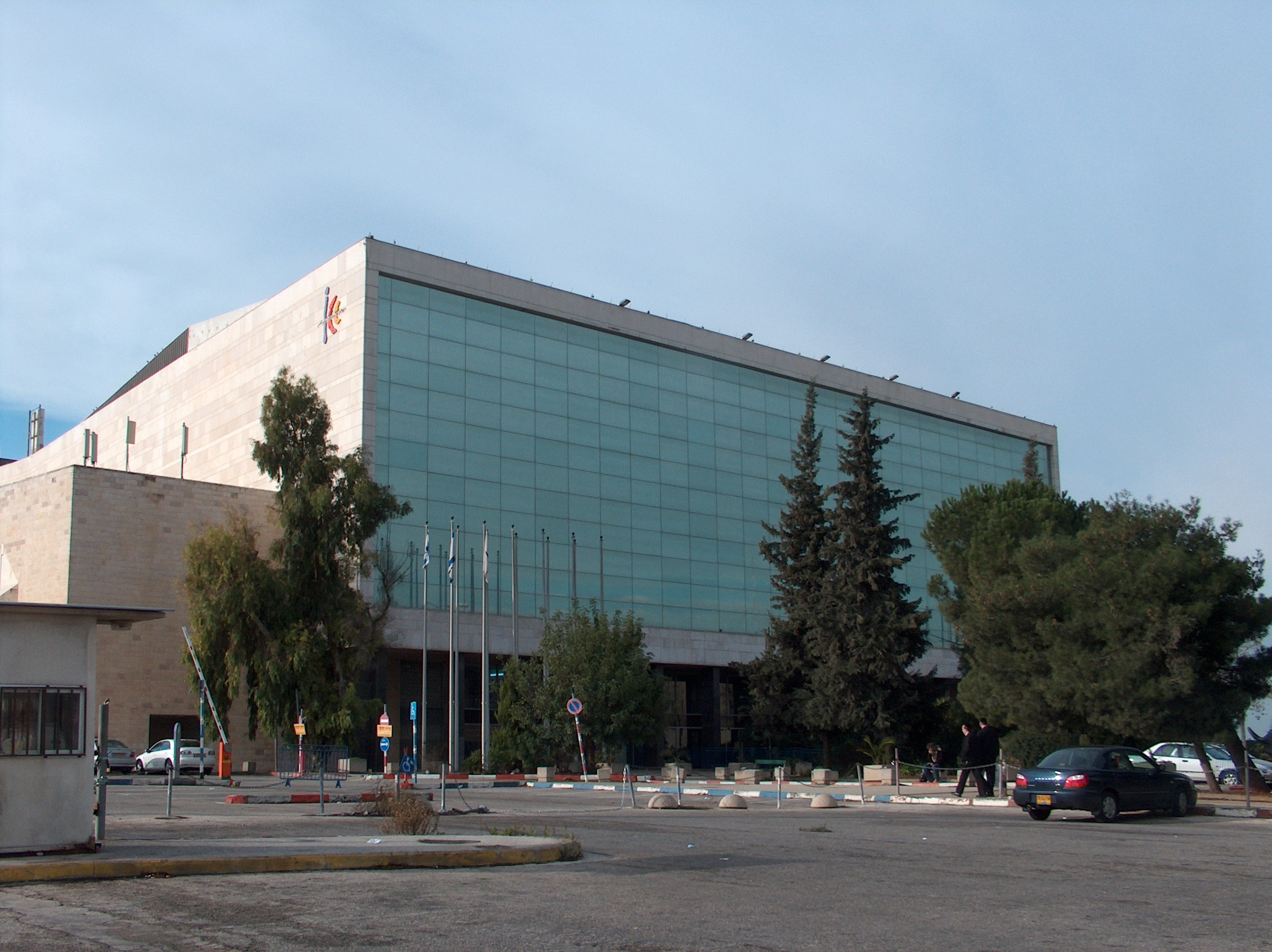
The Eurovision Song Contest 1999 took place at the International Convention Center in Jerusalem, Israel, on 29 May 1999.

The Eurovision Song Contest 1999 took place at the International Convention Center in Jerusalem, Israel, on 29 May 1999. According to the Eurovision rules, the 23-country participant list for the contest was composed of: the previous year's winning country and host nation, the seventeen countries which had obtained the highest average points total over the preceding five contests, and any eligible countries which did not compete in the 1998 contest. Spain was one of the seventeen countries with the most average points and thus was permitted to participate. On 17 November 1998, an allocation draw was held which determined the running order and Spain was set to perform in position 3, following the entry from Belgium and before the entry from Croatia. At the contest, Lydia appeared on stage wearing a rainbow coloured dress designed by Ágatha Ruiz de la Prada, and she finished in twenty-third (last) place with one point.

TVE broadcast the show on La Primera with commentary by José Luis Uribarri. The broadcast of the contest was watched by 3.95 million viewers in Spain with a market share of 34.2%.

=== Voting ===
Below is a breakdown of points awarded to Spain and awarded by Spain in the contest. The nation awarded its 12 points to Croatia in the contest.

TVE appointed Hugo de Campos to announce the results of the Spanish televote during the final.

Points awarded to Spain
Score	Country
12 points	
10 points	
8 points	
7 points	
6 points	
5 points	
4 points	
3 points	
2 points	
1 point	Croatia

Points awarded by Spain
Score	Country
12 points	Croatia
10 points	Iceland
8 points	Israel
7 points	Germany
6 points	Sweden
5 points	Denmark
4 points	United Kingdom
3 points	Netherlands
2 points	Slovenia
1 point	Estonia
