= Prinsengrachtconcert =

Annual open-air concert in Amsterdam, Netherlands

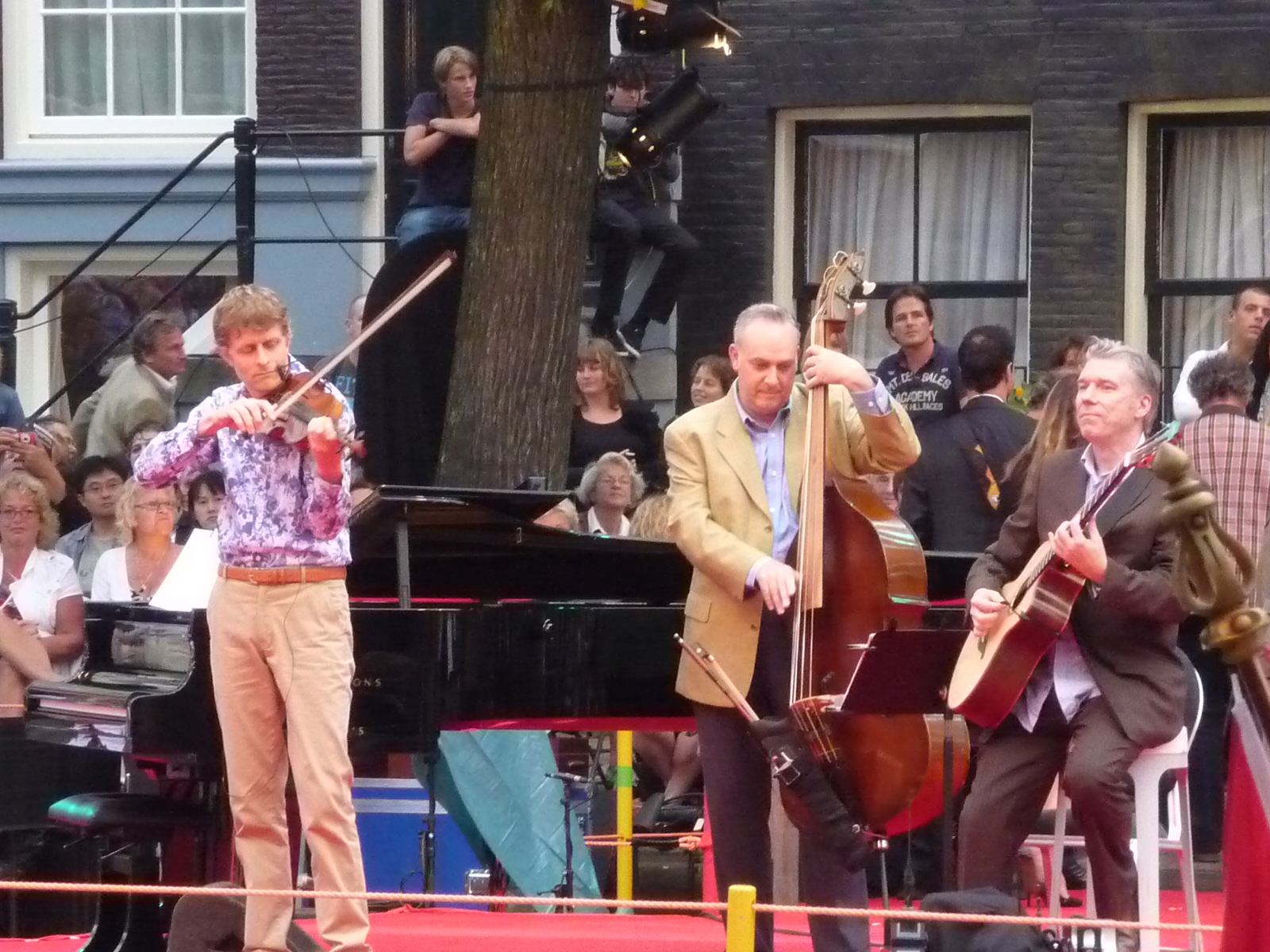
Tim Kliphuis Trio in 2011

The Prinsengrachtconcert is an annual open-air classical music concert held annually in August since 1981. It occurs on the Prinsengracht in Amsterdam. The orchestra is situated on a pontoon anchored in front of the Hotel Pulitzer. Many of the audience watches and listens from boats. Traditionally the concert is closed with a rendition of one of the city's anthems, "Aan de Amsterdamse grachten".

Since 1984 it has been televised by the AVRO. The first Prinsengrachtconcert on ice was held in February 2012.
