= Lydia (singer) =

Spanish pop singer

- Born: Lydia Rodríguez Fernández; 15 January 1980 (age 46); Madrid, Spain
- Genres: Pop; rock
- Occupation: Singer
- Instrument: Voice
- Years active: 1996–present
- Label: Warner Music

Lydia Rodríguez Fernández (Spanish pronunciation: [ˈliðja]; born 1980 in Madrid), better known as Lydia, is a Spanish pop singer and vocal coach.

== Career ==
When Lydia was 16 years old, she released her first album, Lydia, which went platinum in Spain. She became famous after dedicating a song to her musical idol Alejandro Sanz. In 1998 she released her second album, that became gold in Spain.

She represented Spain at the Eurovision Song Contest 1999 with the song "No quiero escuchar" (I don't want to listen), finishing last with one point. Her colorful dress, designed by Ágatha Ruiz de la Prada, attracted much attention and criticism from the Spanish media and spectators.

In 2002, she released her last album as solo singer. In 2007, she starred in the musical Jesus Christ Superstar in several Spanish cities and other projects. In 2008, she replaced Sole Giménez as singer for the Spanish multi-platinum band Presuntos Implicados. The first album that she released with this band, Será (It will be), was nominated for the Latin Grammy Awards 2009.

== Discography ==
=== With Presuntos Implicados ===
==== Albums ====
- 2008 Será
- 2011 Banda Sonora

==== Singles ====
- 2008 "Tu cómo estás"
- 2008 "¿A dónde voy?"
- 2011 "Vuelvo a pensar en ti"

=== Solo studio albums ===
- 1996 Lydia (x1 Platinum)
- 1998 Cien veces al día (x1 Gold)
- 1999 Cien veces al día, Edición Eurovisión (Eurovision Edition)
- 2002 Si no me pides la vida

==== Compilations ====
- 1999 Lydia: el tacto de tu piel y otros grandes éxitos (Greatest Hits)
- 2002 Discografía básica (Discography Box)
- 2003 Lydia: grandes éxitos (Best of

==== Solo singles ====
- 1996 "De la amistad al amor"
- 1996 "Fueron buenos tiempos"
- 1996 "El tacto de tu piel"
- 1996 "No sé si es amor"
- 1997 "Sin ti no puedo"
- 1998 "No sé vivir sin ti"
- 1998 "Cien veces al día"
- 1998 "Aún no quiero enamorarme"
- 1998 "Pienso en"
- 1999 "No quiero escuchar" (Eurovision)
- 2001 "Across the universe"
- 2002 "Esta vez no caeré"
- 2002 "A través de mi ventana"
- 2002 "Ansiedad"
- 2002 "Si no me pides la vida" (with Nacho Campillo)

Preceded by Mikel Herzog with "¿Qué voy a hacer sin ti?"	Spain in the Eurovision Song Contest; 1999	Succeeded by Serafín Zubiri with "Colgado de un sueño"
