= Guildo Horn =

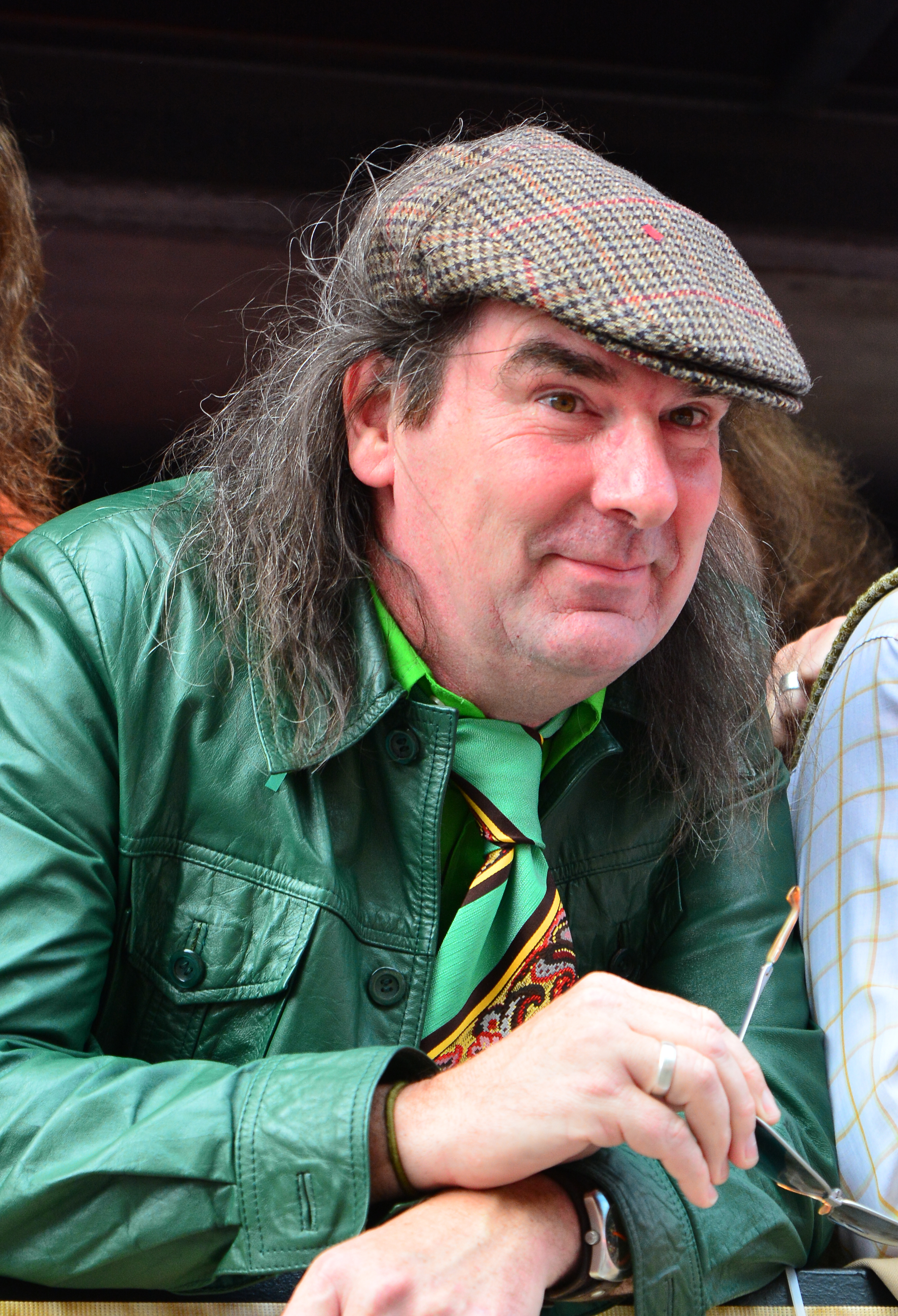
- Horn at Schlagermove in Hamburg, Germany, 2015

Background information
- Born: Horst Heinz Köhler; 15 February 1963 (age 63); Trier, West Germany
- Genres: Schlager
- Occupation: Singer
- Website: guildo-horn.com

Horst Heinz Köhler (born 15 February 1963), known professionally as Guildo Horn (German pronunciation: [ˈɡɪldo ˈhɔʁn]), is a German Schlager singer. He is best known for his eccentric stage persona, which includes outrageous clothes and extroverted antics.

At the Eurovision Song Contest 1998, he came seventh with the song "Guildo hat euch lieb!" ("Guildo loves you!").

== Discography ==
Albums

- Rückkehr nach Mendocino (1992)
- Sternstunden der Zärtlichkeiten (1995)
- Danke! (1997)
- Schön! (1999)
- Der König der Möwen (2002)
- Guildo Horn featuring Pomp & Brass (2003)
- Essential (2005)
- Die Rocky Horny Weihnachtsshow (2005)
- Erhebet die Herzen (2008)
- 20 Jahre Zärtlichkeit (2010)
- Weihnachtsfestival der Liebe (MCD) (2012)

| Preceded by Bianca Shomburg with Zeit | Germany in the Eurovision Song Contest; 1998 | Succeeded by Sürpriz with Reise nach Jerusalem - Kudüs'e seyahat |
