= Eurovision Song Contest 1998 =

International song competition

Date and venue
- Final: 9 May 1998
- Venue: National Indoor Arena; Birmingham, United Kingdom

Organisation
- Organiser: European Broadcasting Union (EBU)
- Scrutineer: Christine Marchal-Ortiz

Production
- Host broadcaster: British Broadcasting Corporation (BBC)
- Director: Geoff Posner
- Executive producer: Kevin Bishop
- Musical director: Martin Koch
- Presenters: Terry Wogan; Ulrika Jonsson

Participants
- Number of entries: 25
- Debuting countries: Macedonia
- Returning countries: Belgium; Finland; Israel; Romania; Slovakia
- Non-returning countries: Austria; Bosnia and Herzegovina; Denmark; Iceland; Italy; Russia
- Participation map: Competing countries Relegated countries unable to participate due to poor results in previous contests Countries that participated in the past but not in 1998

Vote
- Voting system: Each country awarded 12, 10, 8–1 points to their ten favourite songs
- Winning song: Israel; "Diva"

The Eurovision Song Contest 1998 was the 43rd edition of the Eurovision Song Contest, held on 9 May 1998 at the National Indoor Arena in Birmingham, United Kingdom, and presented by Terry Wogan and Ulrika Jonsson. It was organised by the European Broadcasting Union (EBU) and host broadcaster the British Broadcasting Corporation (BBC), who staged the event after winning the 1997 contest for the United Kingdom with the song "Love Shine a Light" by Katrina and the Waves.

Broadcasters from twenty-five countries participated in the contest. Six participating countries in the 1997 edition were absent, with Austria, Bosnia and Herzegovina, Denmark, Iceland and Russia relegated due to achieving the lowest average points totals over the previous five contests and Italy actively choosing not to participate. These countries were replaced by Macedonia in its first contest appearance, and previously relegated and absent countries Belgium, Finland, Israel, Romania and Slovakia.

The winner was Israel with the song "Diva", composed by Svika Pick, written by Yoav Ginai and performed by Dana International. The United Kingdom, Malta, the Netherlands, and Croatia rounded out the top five. Dana International was a winning artist; however, her participation for Israel was controversial among sections of Israeli society and resulted in opposition and death threats against her in the run-up to the contest.

It was the first contest in which the results were determined predominantly through televoting, and would become the last contest in which all participants were required to perform in the language of their country and the last to feature an orchestra and live music accompaniment for the competing entries.

== Location ==
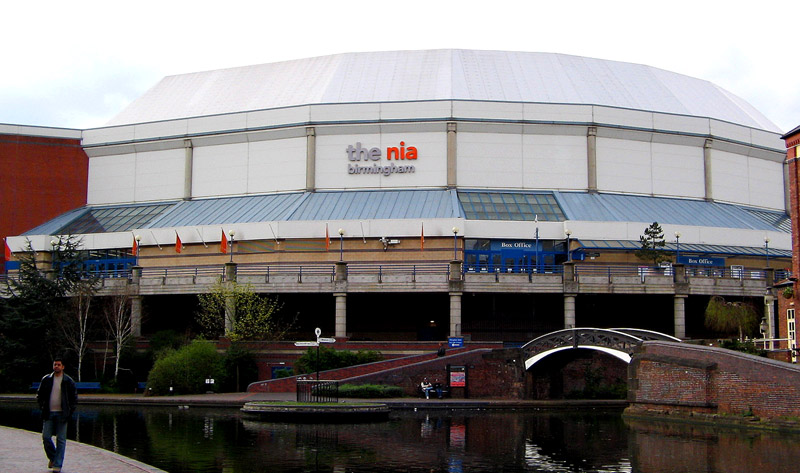
National Indoor Arena, Birmingham – host venue of the 1998 contest

Location of the selected host city (in blue), shortlisted cities (in green) and other cities that expressed interest (in red)

The 1998 contest took place in Birmingham, the United Kingdom, following the country's victory at the 1997 edition with the song "Love Shine a Light", performed by Katrina and the Waves. This was the first contest to take place outside the host nation's capital city since the 1993 contest in Millstreet. It was the eighth time that the United Kingdom had hosted the contest – setting a new contest record – with the nation having previously hosted the contest in London in 1960, 1963, 1968 and 1977, in Edinburgh in 1972, in Brighton in 1974 and in Harrogate in 1982. The selected venue was the National Indoor Arena, a sporting venue and indoor arena opened in 1991 which prior to the contest had previously hosted the 1993 IBF Badminton World Championships and 1995 World Netball Championships, as well as being the principal venue for the recording of UK television programme Gladiators.

Many cities across the United Kingdom expressed interest in hosting the contest, the first to be held in the country in sixteen years, with venues in Aberdeen, Belfast, Bournemouth, Brighton, Birmingham, Cardiff, Edinburgh, Glasgow, Harrogate, Inverness, Liverpool, London, Manchester, Newcastle and Sheffield being considered. Following visits by the production team to each city, Belfast, Birmingham, Cardiff, Glasgow, London and Manchester were shortlisted as potential host cities, and Birmingham's National Indoor Arena was subsequently announced as the host venue on 8 August 1997.

== Participants ==
Eurovision Song Contest 1998 – Participation summaries by country
- Belgium; Croatia; Cyprus; Estonia; Finland; France; Germany; Greece; Hungary; Ireland; Israel; Macedonia; Malta; Netherlands; Norway; Poland; Portugal; Romania; Slovakia; Slovenia; Spain; Sweden; Switzerland; Turkey; United Kingdom

Per the rules of the contest twenty-five countries were allowed to participate in the event. Macedonia participated in the contest for the first time, having previously applied to enter the 1996 contest but failing to progress from that edition's qualifying round; due to the then-ongoing Macedonia naming dispute with Greece, the nation participated under the provisional reference "the former Yugoslav Republic of Macedonia" or its shortened form "FYR Macedonia". Belgium, Finland, Israel, Romania, and Slovakia made a return to the contest, replacing Austria, Bosnia and Herzegovina, Denmark, Iceland, and Russia, which were relegated following the previous year's contest, and Italy which decided against entering the event. Italy would not return to the contest again until 2011.

Among the performers at this year's contest were five representatives who had previously competed as lead artists in past editions. Two artists returned as lead artists in the 1998 contest: Danijela had previously represented Croatia in 1995 as a member of the group Magazin; and José Cid, a member of Alma Lusa, had represented Portugal in 1980. Additionally, three artists who had previously competed as lead artists at Eurovision returned as backing performers for their respective countries at this year's event: José María Guzmán, who had represented Spain in 1986 as a member of the group Cadillac, was a backing singer for Mikel Herzog; Egon Egemann, who had represented Switzerland in 1990, performed on stage as violinist for Gunvor; and Paul Harrington, who won the contest for Ireland in 1994 with Charlie McGettigan, providing backing vocals for Dawn Martin.

Eurovision Song Contest 1998 participants
Country	Broadcaster	Artist	Song	Language	Songwriter(s)	Conductor
Belgium	RTBF	Mélanie Cohl	"Dis oui"	French	Philippe Swan	No conductor
Croatia	HRT	Danijela	"Neka mi ne svane"	Croatian	Petar Grašo	Stipica Kalogjera
Cyprus	CyBC	Michael Hajiyanni	"Genesis" (Γένεσις)	Greek	Michalis Hatzigiannis; Zenon Zindilis	Costas Cacogiannis
Estonia	ETV	Koit Toome	"Mere lapsed"	Estonian	Peeter Pruuli; Maria Rahula; Tomi Rahula	Heiki Vahar
Finland	YLE	Edea	"Aava"	Finnish	Alexi Ahoniemi; Tommy Mansikka-Aho	Olli Ahvenlahti
France	France Télévision	Marie Line	"Où aller"	French	Moïse Crespy; Jean-Philippe Dary; Marie-Line Marolany; Micaël Sene	Martin Koch
Germany	NDR (Note: On behalf of the German public broadcasting consortium ARD)	Guildo Horn	"Guildo hat euch lieb"	German	Stefan Raab	Stefan Raab (Note: Although a conductor was present, the song featured no orchestral accompaniment and was performed entirely to backing track.)
Greece	ERT	Thalassa	"Mia krifi evaisthisia" (Μια κρυφή ευαισθησία)	Greek	Yiannis Malachias; Yiannis Valvis	No conductor
Hungary	MTV	Charlie	"A holnap már nem lesz szomorú"	Hungarian	Attila Horváth; István Lerch	Miklós Malek
Ireland	RTÉ	Dawn Martin	"Is Always Over Now"	English	Gerry Morgan	Noel Kelehan
Israel	IBA	Dana International	"Diva" (דיווה)	Hebrew	Yoav Ginai; Svika Pick	No conductor
Macedonia	MRT	Vlado Janevski	"Ne zori, zoro" (Не зори, зоро)	Macedonian	Vlado Janevski; Grigor Koprov	Aleksandar Džambazov
Malta	PBS	Chiara	"The One That I Love"	English	Sunny Aquilina; Jason Paul Cassar	No conductor
Netherlands	NOS	Edsilia	"Hemel en aarde"	Dutch	Jochem Fluitsma; Eric van Tijn	Dick Bakker
Norway	NRK	Lars A. Fredriksen	"Alltid sommer"	Norwegian	David Eriksen; Linda Andernach Johannesen; Per Kristian Ottestad	Geir Langslet
Poland	TVP	Sixteen	"To takie proste"	Polish	Olga Pruszkowska; Jarosław Pruszkowski	Wiesław Pieregorólka
Portugal	RTP	Alma Lusa	"Se eu te pudesse abraçar"	Portuguese	José Cid	Mike Sergeant
Romania	TVR	Mălina Olinescu	"Eu cred"	Romanian	Adrian Romcescu; Liliana Ștefan	Adrian Romcescu
Slovakia	STV	Katarína Hasprová	"Modlitba"	Slovak	Gabriel Dušík; Anna Wepperyová	Vladimír Valovič
Slovenia	RTVSLO	Vili Resnik	"Naj bogovi slišijo"	Slovene	Matjaž Vlašič; Urša Vlašič	Mojmir Sepe
Spain	TVE	Mikel Herzog	"¿Qué voy a hacer sin ti?"	Spanish	Alberto Estébanez; Mikel Herzog	Alberto Estébanez
Sweden	SVT	Jill Johnson	"Kärleken är"	Swedish	Håkan Almqvist; Ingela "Pling" Forsman; Bobby Ljunggren	Anders Berglund
Switzerland	SRG SSR	Gunvor	"Lass ihn"	German	Egon Egemann; Gunvor Guggisberg	No conductor
Turkey	TRT	Tüzmen	"Unutamazsın"	Turkish	Canan Tunç; Erdinç Tunç	Ümit Eroğlu
United Kingdom	BBC	Imaani	"Where Are You?"	English	Scott English; Phil Manikiza; Simon Stirling	James McMillan

=== Qualification ===
Due to the high number of countries wishing to enter the contest a relegation system was introduced in 1993 in order to reduce the number of countries which could compete in each year's contest. Any relegated countries would be able to return the following year, thus allowing all countries the opportunity to compete in at least one in every two editions. The relegation rules introduced for the 1997 contest were again utilised ahead of the 1998 contest, based on each country's average points total in previous contests. The twenty-five participants were made up of the previous year's winning country and host nation, the eighteen countries which had the highest average points total over the preceding four contests, and any eligible countries which did not compete in the 1997 contest. In cases where the average was identical between two or more countries the total number of points scored in the most recent contest determined the final order.

Austria, Bosnia and Herzegovina, Denmark, Germany, Iceland and Russia were therefore excluded from participating in the 1998 contest; however, after Italy declined to participate Germany was subsequently provided a reprieve and allowed to enter. The calculations used to determine the countries relegated for the 1998 contest are outlined in the table below.

Table key

Qualifier
‡ Automatic qualifier
† New/returning countries which did not compete in 1997

Calculation of average points to determine qualification for the 1998 contest (Note: Determined by totalling all points awarded in the past five contests and dividing by the number of times that country had participated)
Rank	Country	Average	Yearly Point Totals				
Rank	Country	Average	1993	1994	1995	1996	1997
1	Ireland	155.20	187	226	44	162	157
2	United Kingdom ‡	121.40	164	63	76	77	227
3	Norway	91.60	120	76	148	114	0
4	France	80.40	121	74	94	18	95
5	Italy (Note: As Italy decided not to participate the eliminated country with the next highest average points total, Germany, was awarded its place.)	79.50	45				114
6	Malta	75.20	69	97	76	68	66
7	Sweden	74.60	89	48	100	100	36
8	Poland	66.50		166	15	31	54
9	Cyprus	63.40	17	51	79	72	98
10	Spain	61.40	58	17	119	17	96
11	Estonia	59.33	DNQ	2	R	94	82
12	Hungary	54.67	DNQ	122	3	DNQ	39
13	Croatia	54.20	31	27	91	98	24
14	Turkey	52.25	10	R	21	57	121
15	Greece	50.20	64	44	68	36	39
16	Switzerland	47.50	148	15	R	22	5
17	Portugal	46.00	60	73	5	92	0
18	Netherlands	44.75	92	4	R	78	5
19	Israel †	42.50	4	R	81	DNQ	
20 (Note: Despite having the same average score, Slovenia ranked higher than Germany by virtue of receiving more points in the most recent contest.)	Slovenia	42.25	9	R	84	16	60
21	Germany	42.25	18	128	1	DNQ	22
22	Denmark	42.00	9	R	92	DNQ	25
23	Russia	40.00		70	17	DNQ	33
24	Austria	39.60	32	19	67	68	12
25	Iceland	38.20	42	49	31	51	18
26	Bosnia and Herzegovina	23.00	27	39	14	13	22
27	Slovakia †	17.00	DNQ	15	R	19	R
28	Romania †	14.00	DNQ	14	R	DNQ	R
29	Finland †	13.33	20	11	R	9	R
30	Belgium †	11.00	3	R	8	22	R
–	Macedonia †	– (Note: Debut appearance)				DNQ	R

== Production ==
The Eurovision Song Contest 1998 was produced by the British public broadcaster British Broadcasting Corporation (BBC). Kevin Bishop served as executive producer, Guy Freeman served as producer, Geoff Posner served as director, Andrew Howe-Davies served as designer, and Martin Koch served as musical director, leading the 60-piece BBC Concert Orchestra and arranging and orchestrating the music for the opening and closing sequences and the interval act. On behalf of the contest organisers, the European Broadcasting Union (EBU), the event was overseen by Christine Marchal-Ortiz as scrutineer.

Construction within the National Indoor Arena began on 19 April 1998 to build out the stage and orchestral area for the contest, as well as creating space for the green room, the dressing rooms, the press centre and accreditation area, and small rooms for use by each country's individual commentators. Although the arena could hold up to 13,000 people, the assembled audience during the contest was limited to around 4,500, with tickets for the dress rehearsal and live show awarded by ballot. The contest organisers also engaged with fan groups, and tickets in the front rows of the arena were distributed among these groups for the first time.

The green room was situated behind the stage, and was designed to resemble a nightclub. The arena featured three large video screens to enable the audience to follow the voting, and video walls were also constructed for use on stage, in the press centre and the green room. A 400-seat auditorium for press conferences and 38 booths for journalists equipped with phone lines were installed within the press centre, and 40 commentary boxes were constructed in the arena to accommodate the teams from the various broadcasters, with 28 built for television and 12 for radio. Much of the press centre facilities constructed for the contest were subsequently retained and augmented for use during the 24th G8 summit held in Birmingham the following week.

Orchestral rehearsals and rehearsals of the main elements of the interval act took place on 2 and 3 May, with rehearsals for the competing countries beginning on 4 May. The first rehearsals for each country, lasting 40 minutes in total followed by a 20 minute press conference, took place on 4 and 5 May, with second rehearsals for each country taking place on 6 and 7 May and lasting 30 minutes. Three dress rehearsals were held on 8 and 9 May, with an audience in attendance during the evening dress rehearsal on 8 May, which was also recorded for use in case of problems during the live contest that resulted in the broadcast being suspended. Stand-in studios were also prepared in Studio 4 of BBC Television Centre, London and in the Pebble Mill Studios in Birmingham in case of an emergency at the National Indoor Arena that resulted in evacuation.

=== Presenters ===
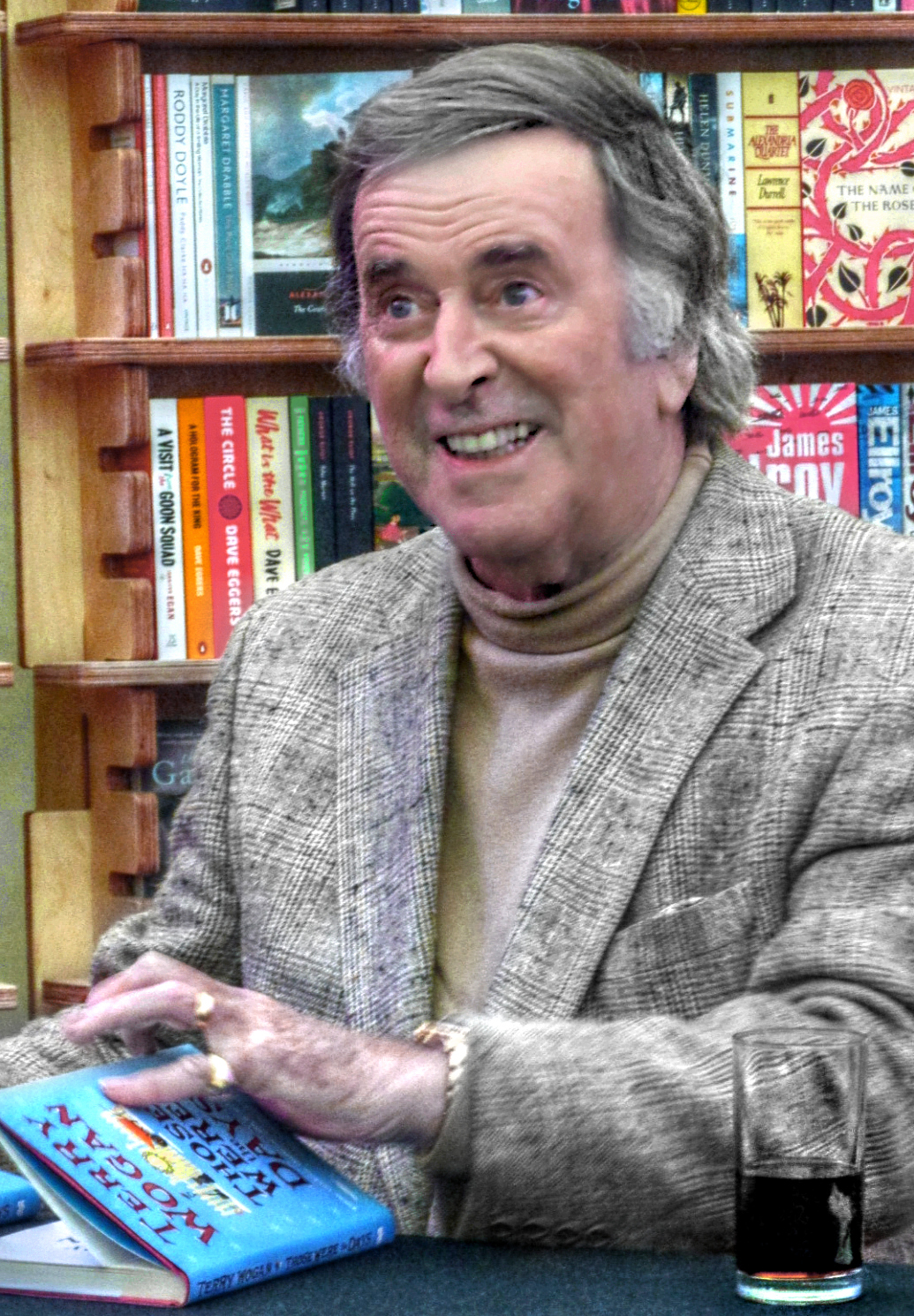
Terry Wogan (pictured in 2015), co-presenter of the 1998 contest

The Swedish-British television presenter and model Ulrika Jonsson and the Irish television and radio presenter Terry Wogan were the presenters of the 1998 contest. Wogan had previously provided television and radio commentary on the BBC since 1971, and performed this role once again for the contest's broadcast on BBC One from a separate commentary booth erected behind the stage in addition to his role as the contest presenter.

The draw to the determine the running order, held on 13 November 1997 in the National Indoor Arena, was compered by Wogan and Katrina Leskanich, lead vocalist of the 1997 contest winners Katrina and the Waves.

=== Conductors ===
For those countries which opted to utilise the orchestra during their performance a separate musical director could be nominated to lead the orchestra, with the host musical director, Martin Koch, also conducting for those countries which did not nominate their own conductor.

The entries from Belgium, Greece, Germany, Israel, Malta, Slovenia and Switzerland were performed entirely without orchestration; however, in the case of Germany and Slovenia, conductors for those countries were present during the contest. Stefan Raab, the writer of the German entry under the pseudonym "Alf Igel", had no intention of conducting the orchestra but insisted on taking the customary conductor's bow before the entry, while the Slovenian entry had been due to be performed with the orchestra before a change of mind by the songwriters during the rehearsals led to the full backing track being used and the original conductor for the Slovenian delegation Mojmir Sepe instead signalling to start the track. The French entry had been planned to be performed completely with the backing track, but during rehearsals a decision was reached to incorporate additional live string accompaniment from the orchestra directed by Martin Koch.

During rehearsals conflict occurred between the contest organisers and the Greek delegation, with the Greeks unhappy with the way that their entry was being presented on screen. Aggressive behaviour by the Greek composer, Yiannis Valvis, during the dress rehearsals led to his accreditation being rescinded, and on the day of the contest the Greek broadcaster Hellenic Broadcasting Corporation (ERT) withdrew from the contest, a decision which was ultimately reversed minutes later. Issues also arose during the rehearsals for the Turkish entry, when its conductor Ümit Eroğlu was found to be leading the orchestra at too slow a tempo, resulting in the performance running over the three minute limit and thus breaking the rules of the contest. Ultimately the final performance lasted two minutes and fifty-nine seconds, ensuring that Turkey could not be disqualified for exceeding the time limit during the final and would remain in the competition.

=== Trophy ===
The trophy awarded to the writers of the winning song was designed by Anongkarat Unyawong, a student at the Birmingham School of Jewellery, who had won a competition conducted at the school for the occasion. The winning performers received a glass bowl designed by Susan Nickson bearing the Eurovision Song Contest 1998 logo. The winners were heralded by the trumpeters of the Life Guards as they entered the stage, and the awards were presented by Katrina Leskanich.

== Format ==
The rules of the Eurovision Song Contest 1998 were published in November 1997. The document set out the overall aim of the contest and provided detail on the organisation of the event, the qualification process, the criteria for the competing songs and performers, the voting system to be used to determine the results of the contest, as well as the rights and responsibilities conferred by the EBU onto the participating broadcasters.

=== Entries ===
Each participating broadcaster submitted one song to the contest, which was required to be no longer than three minutes in duration and performed in the language, or one of the languages, of the participating country. Short quotations from another language, no more than a single phrase repeated a maximum of three times, were permitted. Each entry was able to utilise all or part of the live orchestra and could use instrumental-only backing tracks. This was the second edition of the contest in which the entire song could be performed with a backing track, following the 1997 contest; previously any backing tracks which were used could only include the sound of instruments which featured on stage being mimed by the performers. A maximum of six performers were allowed on stage during each country's performance, and all performers must have reached the age of 16 in the year of the contest.

Selected entries were not permitted to be released commercially before 1 January 1998; entries were only permitted to be released after being selected for the contest, and were then only allowed to be released in the country they represented until after the contest was held. Entries were required to be selected by each country's participating broadcaster by 15 March, and the final submission date for all selected entries to be received by the contest organisers was set for 23 March. This submission was required to include the score of the song for use by the orchestra, a sound recording of the entry and backing track for use during the contest, and the text of the song lyrics in its original language and translations in French and English for distribution to the participating broadcasters, their commentators and juries.

For the first time a watermark was included on screen during each entry with the name of the country being performed, an innovation which has become a standard feature in each contest. This edition of the contest would conversely be the last in which countries would be obliged to perform in their own language and the last to feature an orchestra accompanying the competing entries; from the following year's contest participating countries were able to send entries in any language and the organising broadcaster was no longer obliged to provide an orchestra. In subsequent years the rules would be modified again to remove the option for entries to be accompanied by live music entirely.

=== Voting procedure ===
The results of the 1998 contest were determined through the same scoring system as had first been introduced in 1975: each country awarded twelve points to its favourite entry, followed by ten points to its second favourite, and then awarded points in decreasing value from eight to one for the remaining songs which featured in the country's top ten, with countries unable to vote for their own entry. For the first time each participating country was required to use televoting to determine their points, with countries with weak telephone networks that prevented them from holding a large-scale televote being granted an exception. This followed a trial held in the 1997 contest where televoting was used to determine the points from five of the twenty-five competing countries. Viewers had a total of five minutes to register their vote by calling one of twenty-four different telephone numbers to represent the twenty-five competing entries except that which represented their own country, with voting lines opening following the performance of the last competing entry. Once phone lines were opened a video recap containing short clips of each competing entry with the accompanying phone number for voting was shown in order to aid viewers during the voting window. Systems were also put in place to prevent lobby groups from one country voting for their song by travelling to other countries.

The points from countries which were unable to use televoting were determined by an assembled jury of sixteen individuals, which was required to be split evenly between members of the public and music professionals, comprised additionally of an equal number of men and women, and below and above 30 years of age. In addition countries using televoting were required to appoint a back-up jury of eight members which would be called into action upon technical failure preventing the televote results from being used, with the same equal split of gender, age and occupation. Each jury member voted in secret and awarded between one and ten votes to each participating song, excluding that from their own country and with no abstentions permitted. The votes of each member were collected following the country's performance and then tallied by the non-voting jury chairperson to determine the points to be awarded. In any cases where two or more songs in the top ten received the same number of votes, a show of hands by all jury members was used to determine the final placing; if a tie still remained, the youngest jury member would have the deciding vote.

=== Postcards ===
Each entry was preceded by a video postcard which served as an introduction to the competing artists from each country, as well as providing an opportunity to showcase the running artistic theme of the event and creating a transition between entries to allow stage crew to make changes on stage. The postcards for the 1998 contest continued the theme of the opening segment, with each clip focussing on a particular theme – either an object, place or concept – and creating a juxtaposition between its older and newer versions. Each postcard was accompanied by extracts of Britpop or classical music, with a pattern featured in the final moments of the footage forming into the flag of the country which was about to perform. The various themes for each postcard, and the musical accompaniment which featured, are listed below by order of performance:

1. Croatia – Football; "Sight for Sore Eyes" (M People)
2. Greece – Beaches; "Alright" (Supergrass)
3. France – Aircraft; "Ordinary World" (Duran Duran)
4. Spain – Leisure; The Young Person's Guide to the Orchestra (performed by the Birmingham Symphony Orchestra)
5. Switzerland – Loch Ness; "Enchanted Highland" (APM Celtic Players)
6. Slovakia – Jewellery; "Ain't Talkin' 'bout Dub" (Apollo 440)
7. Poland – Glasgow, Scotland; "Slight Return" (The Bluetones)
8. Israel – Art; "Common People" (Pulp)
9. Germany – Ironworks; "Always on My Mind" (Pet Shop Boys)
10. Malta – Fashion; "Mulder and Scully" (Catatonia)
11. Hungary – Wales; "A Design for Life" (Manic Street Preachers)
12. Slovenia – Pubs; "Ocean Drive" (Lighthouse Family)
13. Ireland – London, England; "Bitter Sweet Symphony" (The Verve)
14. Portugal – Education; "Beautiful Ones" (Suede)
15. Romania – Sailing; "Sailing" (Rod Stewart)
16. United Kingdom – Cars; "Hush" (Kula Shaker)
17. Cyprus – Food; "Born Slippy" (Underworld)
18. Netherlands – Broadcasting; "Polo Mint City" (Texas)
19. Sweden – Retail; "Don't Marry Her" (The Beautiful South)
20. Belgium – Theatres; "She's a Star" (James)
21. Finland – Films; "The Chad Who Loved Me" (Mansun)
22. Norway – Medieval; "Hail to the King" (performed by the Kneller Hall State Trumpeters)
23. Estonia – Belfast, Northern Ireland; "Bright Side of the Road" (Van Morrison)
24. Turkey – National landmarks; Symphony No. 5, III: Romanza (Ralph Vaughan Williams)
25. Macedonia – Weather; "Sugar Coated Iceberg" (The Lightning Seeds)

== Contest overview ==
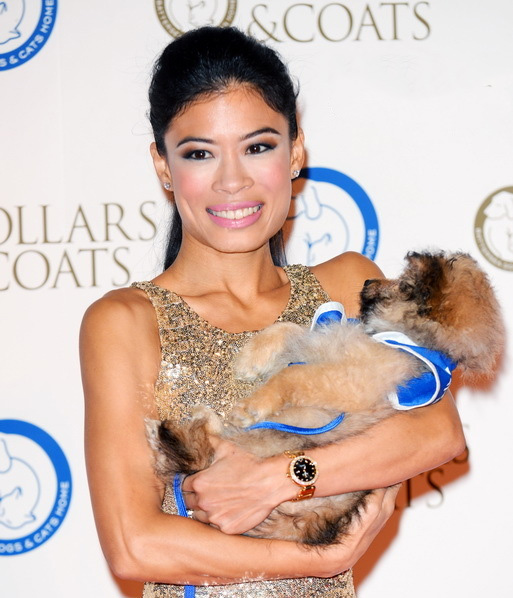
Violinist Vanessa-Mae performed as part of the interval act.

The contest took place on 9 May 1998 at 20:00 (BST) and lasted 3 hours. The table below outlines the participating countries, the order in which they performed, the competing artists and songs, and the results of the voting.

The contest began with a video entitled "Birmingham, Old and New", which presented overlapping images of Birmingham in 1998 with archive footage of the city, including shots of Brindleyplace and boats on the city's canal network, to music from the BBC Concert Orchestra. A fanfare from the trumpeters of the Life Guards greeted the contest's presenters as they entered the stage. Also featured during the opening section of the broadcast was a summary video of the 1960 contest, the first to be held in the United Kingdom, with that year's presenter Katie Boyle – the only individual to host four contests – in attendance as a special guest. Special appearances were also featured from Katrina Leskanich and Carrie Crowley, the co-presenter of the 1997 contest, who appeared via video link from Dublin.

The interval performance was entitled "Jupiter, The Bringer of Jollity", based on music from the movement of the same name from the orchestral suite The Planets by English composer Gustav Holst. A medley of vocal and instrumental pieces inspired by English, Scottish, Welsh, Irish, Indian and Zulu cultures, the segment included over 200 performers and featured music from the BBC Concert Orchestra and performances by soprano Lesley Garrett, violinist Vanessa-Mae, the Sutherland Pipe Band, Andrew Findon on tin whistle, Carys Hughes on harp, the bhangra dance group Nachda Sansaar, the Canoldir Male Voice Choir, the Grimethorpe Colliery Band, trumpeters from the Band of the Blues and Royals and an excerpt of Patti Boulaye's Sun Dance.

The winner was Israel represented by the song "Diva", composed by Svika Pick, written by Yoav Ginai and performed by Dana International. This marked Israel's third contest win, following the country's back-to-back victories in 1978 and 1979. Dana International, the contest's first openly transgender participant, also became the first openly LGBTQ+ and first openly transgender artist to win the event. The United Kingdom earned a record-extending fifteenth second place finish, Malta's third place finish equalled its previous best contest performance, and the Netherlands obtained its best placing since its most recent victory in 1975 by finishing in fourth place.

Following her victory Dana International also caused a delay in the production when, following the conclusion of the voting, she changed outfits into one specially designed for the contest by Jean Paul Gaultier but which was ultimately not used for the original performance. This led to scenes towards the end of the broadcast of hosts Terry Wogan and Ulrika Jonsson, and last year's winning vocalist Katrina Leskanich, looking perturbed and confused as to the delay and location of Dana International.

Following the contest it was announced the results of the Spanish vote had been incorrectly tabulated, resulting in Germany, which should have been awarded twelve points, receiving no points at all; this subsequently had an impact on the remaining countries which were awarded points by Spain. The tables in this article present the corrected results as published by the EBU.

Results of the Eurovision Song Contest 1998 (Note: The below table reflects the official results as published by the EBU following the contest. Due to a calculation error the Spanish points were incorrectly awarded, and Germany, which should have been awarded 12 points as the highest voted song by the Spanish public, received zero points during the original broadcast. As a result of the correction, the points total of the remaining countries in the Spanish top ten were modified, with Israel and Norway being reduced by two points and Belgium, Portugal, Malta, the Netherlands, the United Kingdom, Estonia, Croatia and Turkey being reduced by one point.)
R/O	Country	Artist	Song	Points	Place
1	Croatia	Danijela	"Neka mi ne svane"	131	5
2	Greece	Thalassa	"Mia krifi evaisthisia"	12	20
3	France	Marie Line	"Où aller"	3	24
4	Spain	Mikel Herzog	"¿Qué voy a hacer sin ti?"	21	16
5	Switzerland	Gunvor	"Lass ihn"	0	25
6	Slovakia	Katarína Hasprová	"Modlitba"	8	21
7	Poland	Sixteen	"To takie proste"	19	17
8	Israel	Dana International	"Diva"	172	1
9	Germany	Guildo Horn	"Guildo hat euch lieb"	86	7
10	Malta	Chiara	"The One That I Love"	165	3
11	Hungary	Charlie	"A holnap már nem lesz szomorú"	4	23
12	Slovenia	Vili Resnik	"Naj bogovi slišijo"	17	18
13	Ireland	Dawn Martin	"Is Always Over Now"	64	9
14	Portugal	Alma Lusa	"Se eu te pudesse abraçar"	36	12
15	Romania	Mălina Olinescu	"Eu cred"	6	22
16	United Kingdom	Imaani	"Where Are You?"	166	2
17	Cyprus	Michael Hajiyanni	"Genesis"	37	11
18	Netherlands	Edsilia	"Hemel en aarde"	150	4
19	Sweden	Jill Johnson	"Kärleken är"	53	10
20	Belgium	Mélanie Cohl	"Dis oui"	122	6
21	Finland	Edea	"Aava"	22	15
22	Norway	Lars A. Fredriksen	"Alltid sommer"	79	8
23	Estonia	Koit Toome	"Mere lapsed"	36	12
24	Turkey	Tüzmen	"Unutamazsın"	25	14
25	Macedonia	Vlado Janevski	"Ne zori, zoro"	16	19

=== Spokespersons ===
Each participating broadcaster appointed a spokesperson who was responsible for announcing, in English or French, the votes for its respective country. As had been the case since the 1994 contest, the spokespersons were connected via satellite and appeared in vision during the broadcast. Spokespersons at the 1998 contest are listed below.

During the voting procedure Ulrika Jonsson had an unplanned comical moment with the Dutch spokesperson Conny Vandenbos; after Vandenbos had expressed her sympathy with the performers in the contest – having previously represented the Netherlands in 1965 – she added that "it's long ago". This comment was not heard by the audience in the arena due to noise, but Jonsson's reply, "a long time ago, was it?" was, leading to a reaction from the crowd due to the perceived rudeness of the remark out of context.

1. Croatia – Davor Meštrović
2. Greece – Alexis Kostalas
3. France – Marie Myriam
4. Spain – Belén Fernández de Henestrosa
5. Switzerland – Regula Elsener
6. Slovakia – Alena Heribanová
7. Poland – Jan Chojnacki
8. Israel – Yigal Ravid
9. Germany – Nena
10. Malta – Stephanie Spiteri
11. Hungary – Barna Héder
12. Slovenia – Mojca Mavec
13. Ireland – Eileen Dunne
14. Portugal – Lúcia Moniz
15. Romania – Anca Țurcașiu
16. United Kingdom – Ken Bruce
17. Cyprus – Marina Maleni
18. Netherlands – Conny Vandenbos
19. Sweden – Björn Hedman
20. Belgium – Marie-Hélène Vanderborght
21. Finland – Marjo Wilska
22. Norway – Ragnhild Sælthun Fjørtoft
23. Estonia – Urve Tiidus
24. Turkey – Osman Erkan
25. Macedonia – Evgenija Teodosievska

== Detailed voting results ==
Televoting was used to determine the points awarded by all countries, except Hungary, Romania and Turkey. The announcement of the results from each country was conducted in the order in which they performed, with the spokespersons announcing their country's points in English or French in ascending order. The detailed breakdown of the points awarded by each country is listed in the tables below.

Detailed voting results of the Eurovision Song Contest 1998
Voting procedure used: 100% televoting 100% jury vote		Total score	Croatia	Greece	France	Spain	Switzerland	Slovakia	Poland	Israel	Germany	Malta	Hungary	Slovenia	Ireland	Portugal	Romania	United Kingdom	Cyprus	Netherlands	Sweden	Belgium	Finland	Norway	Estonia	Turkey	Macedonia
Contestants	Croatia	131		5	8	1	5	10	6	10	10	10		**12**	3	2		2	7	4	3	5	3	6	3	4	**12**
Contestants	Greece	12																	**12**								
Contestants	France	3																	1								2
Contestants	Spain	21	1		4		6			3									4			3					
Contestants	Switzerland	0																									
Contestants	Slovakia	8	8																								
Contestants	Poland	19			2						5		2				10										
Contestants	Israel	**172**		10	**12**	10	10		10		7	**12**		7	6	**12**	7	5	10	6	5	10	10	3	7	5	8
Contestants	Germany	86		3		**12**	**12**							8	8	10	6	6		**12**		7	1		1		
Contestants	Malta	165	7	6	6	5	8	**12**	8	7	8		7	3	**12**	5		**12**	5	8	6	8	5	**12**	5	10	
Contestants	Hungary	4			1												1							2			
Contestants	Slovenia	17	3	2													5						4			3	
Contestants	Ireland	64	2				2	4	2		2	6	6	1		1	8	8			1			4	2	8	7
Contestants	Portugal	36		1	10	6		2		2		2							2			1				6	4
Contestants	Romania	6								6																	
Contestants	United Kingdom	166	**12**	7	3	3	3	1	7	**12**	1	8	10	5	5	6	**12**		8	7	7	6	8	5	8	**12**	10
Contestants	Cyprus	37	4	**12**				5		1		1	1			4	4	3				2					
Contestants	Netherlands	150	10	8	5	4	7	6	5	8	6	7	**12**		10	7		10			8	**12**	7	8		7	3
Contestants	Sweden	53							3			4	8		2			1		5			6	10	**12**	2	
Contestants	Belgium	122		4	7	7	4	7	**12**	5	4	3	3	6	7	8		7	6	10	2			7	6	1	6
Contestants	Finland	22																			10			1	10		1
Contestants	Norway	79				8	1		4	4	3	5	5	10	4	3		4	3	3	**12**	4	2		4		
Contestants	Estonia	36				2		8	1				4	2	1					2	4		**12**				
Contestants	Turkey	25	5								**12**						2			1							5
Contestants	Macedonia	16	6					3						4			3										

=== 12 points ===
The below table summarises how the maximum 12 points were awarded from one country to another. The winning country is shown in bold. Malta and the United Kingdom each received the maximum score of 12 points from four countries, with Germany and Israel receiving three sets of 12 points each, Croatia and the Netherlands receiving two sets each, and Belgium, Cyprus, Estonia, Greece, Norway, Sweden and Turkey each receiving one maximum score.

Distribution of 12 points awarded at the Eurovision Song Contest 1998
N.	Contestant	Nation(s) giving 12 points
4	Malta	Ireland, Norway, Slovakia, United Kingdom
4	United Kingdom	Croatia, Israel, Romania, Turkey
3	Germany	Netherlands, Spain, Switzerland
3	**Israel**	France, Malta, Portugal
2	Croatia	Macedonia, Slovenia
2	Netherlands	Belgium, Hungary
1	Belgium	Poland
1	Cyprus	Greece
1	Estonia	Finland
1	Greece	Cyprus
1	Norway	Sweden
1	Sweden	Estonia
1	Turkey	Germany

== Broadcasts ==
Each participating broadcaster was required to relay live and in full the contest via television. Non-participating EBU member broadcasters were also able to relay the contest as "passive participants"; any passive countries wishing to participate in the following year's event were also required to provide a live broadcast of the contest or a deferred broadcast within 24 hours. Broadcasters were able to send commentators to provide coverage of the contest in their own native language and to relay information about the artists and songs to their television viewers. These commentators were typically sent to the venue to report on the event, and were able to provide commentary from small booths constructed at the back of the venue.

The 1998 contest was transmitted to 33 European countries, as well as to Australia, Canada and South Korea, with an estimated audience of 600 million viewers reported following the contest. Known details on the broadcasts in each country, including the specific broadcasting stations and commentators, are shown in the tables below.

Broadcasters and commentators in participating countries
Country	Broadcaster	Channel(s)	Commentator(s)	Ref.
Belgium	RTBF	RTBF La 1	Jean-Pierre Hautier	
Belgium	VRT	TV1, Radio 2	André Vermeulen and Andrea Croonenberghs	
Croatia	HRT	HRT 1	Aleksandar Kostadinov	
Cyprus	CyBC	RIK 1	Evi Papamichail	
Estonia	ETV		Reet Linna	
Estonia	ER	Raadio 2	Marko Reikop	
Finland	YLE	TV1	Maria Guzenina and Sami Aaltonen	
Finland	YLE	Radio Suomi	Sanna Kojo	
Finland	YLE	Radio Vega		
France	France Télévision	France 2	Chris and Laura Mayne	
Germany	ARD	Das Erste	Peter Urban	
Hungary	MTV	MTV 1	Gábor Gundel Takács	
Hungary	MR	Petőfi Rádió	Péter Deák Horváth	
Ireland	RTÉ	RTÉ One	Pat Kenny	
Ireland	RTÉ	RTÉ Radio 1	Larry Gogan	
Israel	IBA	Channel 1		
Malta	PBS	TVM		
Netherlands	NOS	TV2	Willem van Beusekom	
Netherlands	NCRV	Radio 2		
Norway	NRK	NRK1	Jostein Pedersen	
Norway	NRK	NRK P1	Stein Dag Jensen	
Poland	TVP	TVP1	Artur Orzech	
Portugal	RTP	RTP1 (Note: Additional live broadcast on RTP Internacional)	Rui Unas	
Romania	TVR	TVR 1	Leonard Miron	
Slovakia	STV	STV2		
Slovenia	RTVSLO	SLO 1		
Slovenia	RTVSLO	Val 202	Andrej Karoli	
Spain	TVE	La Primera	José Luis Uribarri	
Sweden	SVT	SVT2	Pernilla Månsson and Christer Björkman	
Sweden	SR	SR P4	Anna Hötzel and Claes-Johan Larsson	
Switzerland	SRG SSR	SF 2		
Switzerland	SRG SSR	TSR 1	Jean-Marc Richard	
Switzerland	SRG SSR	TSI 1	Jonathan Tedesco	
Switzerland	Radio 24			
Turkey	TRT	TRT 1 (Note: Additional live broadcast on TRT Int)	Bülend Özveren	
United Kingdom	BBC	BBC One (Note: Additional live broadcast on BBC Prime)	Terry Wogan	
United Kingdom	BBC	BBC Radio 2	Ken Bruce	

Broadcasters and commentators in non-participating countries
Country	Broadcaster	Channel(s)	Commentator(s)	Ref.
Australia	SBS	SBS TV (Note: Deferred broadcast the following day at 19:00 (ACST))		
Austria	ORF	ORF 1	Ernst Grissemann	
Austria	ORF	FM4	Stermann & Grissemann	
Denmark	DR	DR1	Keld Heick	
Falkland Islands	BFBS	BFBS Television		
Faroe Islands	SvF			
Greenland	KNR	KNR (Note: Deferred broadcast at 22:35 (WGST))		
Iceland	RÚV	Sjónvarpið, Rás 2	Páll Óskar Hjálmtýsson	
Latvia	LTV		Kārlis Streips	
Lithuania	LRT	LTV		
Yugoslavia	RTS	RTS 3K		

== Other awards ==
=== Barbara Dex Award ===
The Barbara Dex Award, created in 1997 by fansite House of Eurovision, was awarded to the performer deemed to have been the "worst dressed" among the participants. The winner in 1998 was Germany's representative Guildo Horn, as determined by the founders of the House of Eurovision site Edwin van Thillo and Rob Paardekam.

== Reception and legacy ==
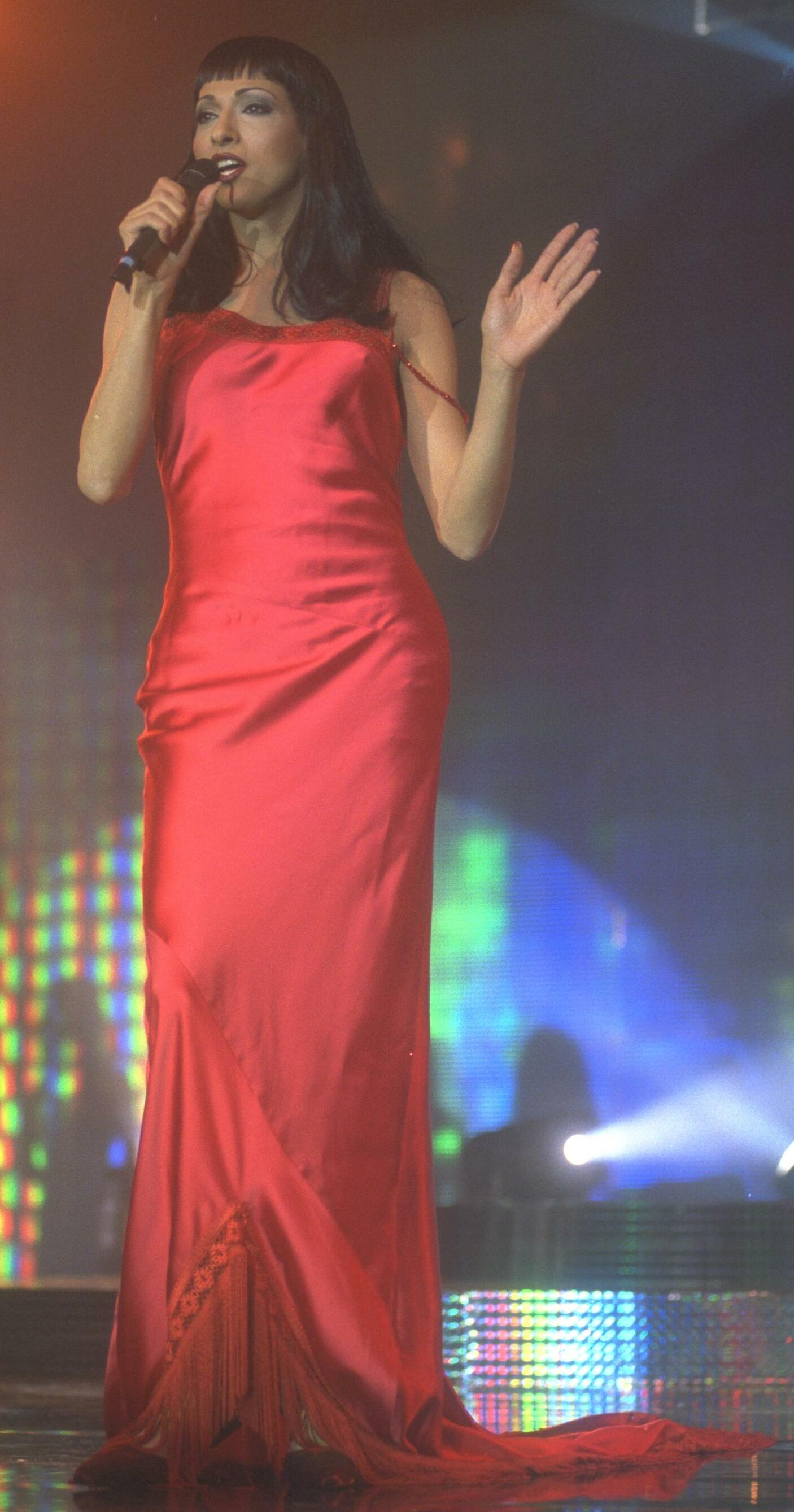
Dana International brought Israel its third victory in the contest and became the contest's first openly LGBTQ+ winner.

The selection of Dana International as the Israeli representative for the contest by the Israel Broadcasting Authority (IBA) created uproar among members of the Orthodox Jewish community in Israel. Taking issue with the singer's transgender status, groups mounted street protests against her selection, and she also received death threats ahead of the contest. Her selection was also opposed by political figures, with deputy minister Shlomo Benizri demanding her removal, referring to the singer as "an abomination" and another member of the Knesset describing her selection as "sending a message of darkness". On arriving at the contest Dana International was accommodated in the Hyatt Regency Birmingham, the only hotel in Birmingham with bulletproof windows, and was accompanied in public by armed guards.

"Diva" was subsequently nominated in 2005 to compete in Congratulations: 50 Years of the Eurovision Song Contest, a special broadcast to determine the contest's most popular entry of its first 50 years as part of the contest's anniversary celebrations. One of fourteen entries chosen to compete – the only song from the 1990s on the list – "Diva" ultimately finished in thirteenth place.

== Notes and references ==
=== Bibliography ===
- Murtomäki, Asko (2007). Finland 12 points! Suomen Euroviisut (in Finnish). Helsinki, Finland: Teos. ISBN 951-851-106-3.
- O'Connor, John Kennedy (2010). The Eurovision Song Contest: The Official History (2nd ed.). London, United Kingdom: Carlton Books. ISBN 978-1-84732-521-1.
- Pajala, Mari (2007). "Closeting Eurovision. Heteronormativity in the Finnish national television". Queer Eurovision. 2. Suomen Queer-tutkimuksen Seuran lehti: 25–42. Archived from the original on 20 June 2022.
- Roxburgh, Gordon (2020). Songs for Europe: The United Kingdom at the Eurovision Song Contest. Vol. Four: The 1990s. Prestatyn, United Kingdom: Telos Publishing. ISBN 978-1-84583-163-9.
- Thorsson, Leif; Verhage, Martin (2006). Melodifestivalen genom tiderna : de svenska uttagningarna och internationella finalerna [Melodifestivalen through the ages: the Swedish selections and international finals] (in Swedish). Stockholm, Sweden: Premium Publishing. pp. 266–267. ISBN 91-89136-29-2.
