= Ireland in the Eurovision Song Contest 1998 =

- Eurovision Song Contest 1998
- Participating broadcaster: Radio Telefís Éireann (RTÉ)
- Country: Ireland
- Selection process: Eurosong '98
- Selection date: 8 March 1998

Competing entry
- Song: "Is Always Over Now?"
- Artist: Dawn Martin
- Songwriter: Gerry Morgan

Placement
- Final result: 9th, 64 points

Participation chronology

Ireland was represented at the Eurovision Song Contest 1998 with the song "Is Always Over Now?", written by Gerry Morgan, and performed by Dawn Martin. The Irish participating broadcaster, Radio Telefís Éireann (RTÉ), selected its entry through a national final.

== Before Eurovision ==
=== Eurosong '98 ===
==== Réalta '98 ====
Réalta was a radio song contest started in 1995 by RTÉ Raidió na Gaeltacht exclusively for Irish songs. The first edition of the contest was not related to Eurosong, but from 1996 until 1999, the recent winner of Réalta would qualify to Eurosong. The 4th edition of Réalta took place on 31 December 1997. The running order and results of Réalta '98 are unknown.

Artist	Song
Alan Milligan	"Caipín bán"
Art Ó Dufaigh	"Céim ar chéim"
Brendan Monaghan	"Fonn sin i mo cheann"
Caitriona McDermott	"Eist go fóill"
Cathal Ó Cathain	"Lúrabóg larabóg"
Deirdre Ní Chinnéide	"Seo chugainn an samradh"
Diane Ní Chanainn	"Sráideacha"
Melanie O'Reilly	"Chugat an púca"
Micheál Ó hAlluráin	"Galar an cheoil"
Seán Monaghan	"Ina measc"

==== Final ====
RTÉ held Eurosong '98 on 8 March 1998 at the RTÉ Television Centre in Dublin, hosted by Pat Kenny. 400 entries were submitted for the competition, and eight artists and songs were selected to compete. Votes from ten regional juries determined the winner and after the combination of votes, "Is Always Over Now?" performed by Dawn Martin was selected as the winner.

Final – 8 March 1998
R/O	Artist	Song	Songwriter(s)	Points	Place
1	Dawn Martin	"Is Always Over Now?"	Gerry Morgan	95	1
2	Partners in Crime	"Shine On"	Niall O'Brien-Moran	63	5
3	Ray Doherty	"Cold Shoulder"	Ray Doherty	39	8
4	The Vard Sisters	"Seol"	Liam Lawton	92	2
5	Family	"Save This Dance for Me"	Danny Sheerin, Des Sheerin	57	6
6	Seán Monaghan	"Ina measc"	Sean Monagahan	43	7
7	The Carter Twins	"Make the Change"	Ronan Keating	77	4
8	Jo Collins	"Overload"	Jo Collins	84	3

Detailed Regional Jury Votes
R/O	Song	Athlone	Cork	Dingle	Dublin	Dundalk	Galway	Limerick	Maghery	Sligo	Waterford	Total
1	"Is Always Over Now?"	12	12	10	12	7	10	12	6	8	6	95
2	"Shine On"	5	6	6	6	6	7	7	5	7	8	63
3	"Cold Shoulder"	3	4	3	3	4	5	4	4	4	5	39
4	"Seol"	7	8	12	8	10	8	5	12	10	12	92
5	"Save This Dance for Me"	6	5	5	4	8	4	8	8	5	4	57
6	"Ina measc"	4	3	4	5	3	12	3	3	3	3	43
7	"Make the Change"	10	10	7	7	5	6	6	10	6	10	77
8	"Overload"	8	7	8	10	12	3	10	7	12	7	84

== At Eurovision ==
Dawn performed 13th in the running order on the evening of the contest. "Is Always Over Now?" went on to place 9th with 64 points. Paul Harrington, who won the contest for Ireland in 1994, performed backing vocals.

=== Voting ===
Points awarded to Ireland
Score	Country
12 points	
10 points	
8 points	Romania; Turkey; United Kingdom
7 points	Macedonia
6 points	Hungary; Malta
5 points	
4 points	Norway; Slovakia
3 points	
2 points	Croatia; Estonia; Germany; Poland; Switzerland
1 point	Portugal; Slovenia; Sweden

Points awarded by Ireland
Score	Country
12 points	Malta
10 points	Netherlands
8 points	Germany
7 points	Belgium
6 points	Israel
5 points	United Kingdom
4 points	Norway
3 points	Croatia
2 points	Sweden
1 point	Estonia
