= Mikel Herzog =

- Birth name: Miguel Herzog Herzog
- Born: 16 April 1960 (age 65); Bergara, Gipuzkoa, Spain
- Genres: Pop
- Occupation: Singer

Mikel Herzog Herzog (born 16 April 1960 in Bergara, Gipuzkoa, Basque Country, Spain) is a Spanish singer-songwriter known for his participation in the 1998 Eurovision Song Contest.

Herzog was a member of various groups in the 1980s, including his own band Ébano. For a short time he was the drummer for the band Cadillac, and later became a member of La Década Prodigiosa. He also wrote songs for other artists, including "Tractor amarillo" which was a hit for the group Zapato Veloz in 1993; and "La Puerta del Colegio" (1991) and "Mi Amada" (1993), hits for the Mexican group Magneto (along with Alberto Estébanez). He released several solo singles in the 1990s, and "Hasta el final del mundo", a duet with Mónica Naranjo.

In 1998, Herzog was chosen by broadcaster Televisión Española as the Spanish representative for the 43rd Eurovision Song Contest with the song "¿Qué voy a hacer sin ti?" ("What Will I Do Without You?"). At the contest, held in Birmingham on 9 May, "¿Qué voy a hacer sin ti?" finished in 16th place of 25 entries.

In 2001, Herzog joined the team of reality TV singing competition Operación Triunfo, which served to select the Spanish entrant for the 2002 Eurovision Song Contest. Herzog was the post-academy director, responsible for ongoing coaching of eliminated contestants, some of whom would provide backing vocals for the ultimate winner of the show. In 2007, he was again involved in Spain's Eurovision selection as one of five judges on the show Misión Eurovisión 2007.

== Discography ==
=== Albums (as a solo artist) ===
- Bienvenidos al paraíso (1992)
- Un regalo de amor (1994)
- La magia del amor (1996)
- ¿Qué voy a hacer sin ti? (1998)
- En tu mano está (1999)
- Cómo pasa el tiempo (2006)

Preceded by Marcos Llunas with "Sin rencor"	Spain in the Eurovision Song Contest; 1998	Succeeded by Lydia with "No quiero escuchar"
