= Presuntos Implicados =

Spanish pop band

- Origin: Yecla, Murcia, Spain
- Genres: Sophisti-pop; dance-pop; smooth soul
- Years active: 1983–2021
- Labels: RCA; Intermitente; Warner Music Spain
- Members: Lydia Rodríguez; Nacho Mañó; Juan Luís Giménez
- Past members: Sole Giménez (1983–2006); Pablo Gómez (1984–1986); Javier Vela (1986–1988)
- Website: www.presuntos.com

Presuntos Implicados was a Spanish pop band, created in March 1983 in Yecla, Murcia. The band was originally composed of the siblings Sole Giménez and Juan Luís Giménez, and their friend Pablo Gómez. In the same year 1983, they won a radio contest and their first recording, Danzad, Danzad Malditos, appeared one year later under the RCA label. But the record company forced them to write more commercial songs outside their style, and they left in 1986 to work with an independent label, Discos Intermitentes. Pablo Gómez left the group and Javier Vela arrived to replace him.

In 1987, they recorded their De sol a sol album and their song "En la oscuridad" (In the darkness) was chosen as best single of the year by RNE. This recording went to be double platinum and allowed them to sign a contract with WEA Records. Javier Vela left and was replaced by Nacho Mañó, who had produced De sol a sol.

Over an eight year period, the band prolifically released new recordings, each time adding more Latino, Brazilian, and jazz sounds to their usual pop and funk repertoire, and always led by the distinctive voice of Sole Giménez. The three members of the group controlled all aspects of their recordings, including composition, arrangements, and record production.

In 1995, they gave a big concert in the Palau de la Música in Valencia producing a double live album called La Noche, which featured a duet between Sole Giménez and Randy Crawford and another one with Ana Torroja (vocalist of the Spanish pop group Mecano) in Torroja's first public appearance after Mecano's first break up, singing with Sole Giménez on one of Presuntos' hits, "Cada historia".

After a two year break, the band released Siete in 1997, supported by a long tour. Versión Original (1999), their next album, is an homage to some of their favourite songs, especially dedicated to their Latin influences. Gente (2001) resulted in a breaking album, with the title track as a hit.

The album Postales (2005), changed the tone of their lyrics to tackle social and pacifist topics. As with previous albums, the band supported this release with a tour, at first with the core band, and later in an acoustic lineup in theatres and small venues.

Twenty years after their debut, Presuntos Implicados became one of the top groups in the Spanish music landscape. However, in February 2006, lead vocalist Sole Giménez announced she was leaving the band in May at the close of the tour. Sole and Juan Luís went on to establish solo careers; Juan Luís would record under different names and many more records. Nacho and Juan Luís are also top producers for many bands in Spain.

Presuntos Implicados' final lead vocalist was Lydia., heard on the album Será (September 2008), with 14 tracks.

== Discography ==
- Danzad, danzad malditos (Dance! Dance, Damn You!) (1985)
- De sol a sol (From sunrise to sunset) (1987)
- Alma de Blues (Soul of Blues) (1989)
- Ser de Agua (Water being) (1991)
- El pan y la sal (Bread and salt) (1994)
- La noche (The night) (1995)
- Siete (Seven) (1997)
- Versión Original (Original version) (1999)
- Gente (People) (2001)
- Selección natural (Natural selection) (2002)
- Postales (Postcards) (2005)
- Será (It will be) (2008)
- Banda Sonora (2011)
- La Noche 2 desde Ciudad de México (The Night 2 from México City) (2013/2014)
