= Hans Boskamp =

Dutch footballer and actor

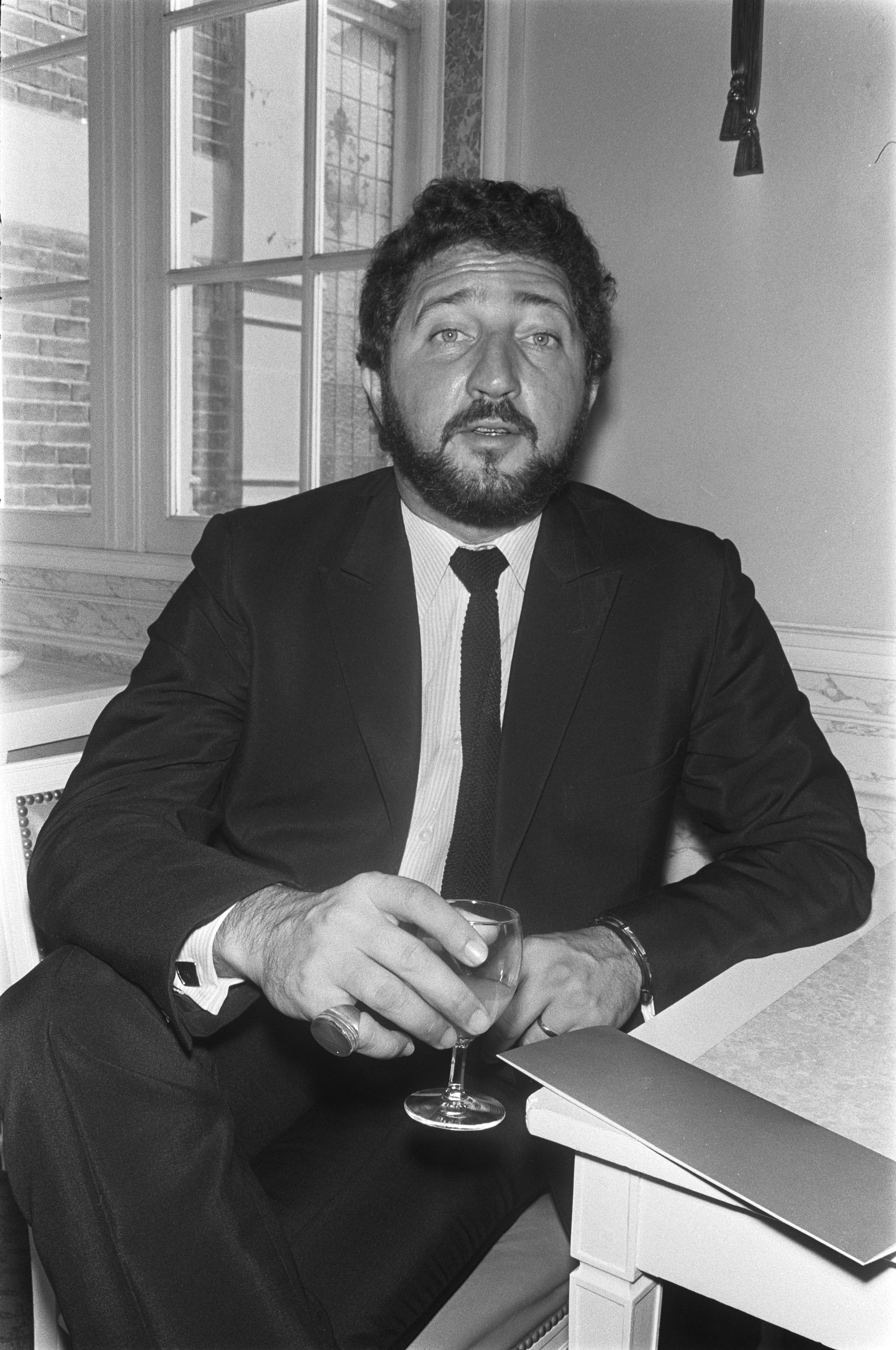
- Boskamp in 1970

Personal information
- Full name: Johannes Hendricus Gerardus Hölscher
- Date of birth: 7 May 1932
- Place of birth: Rotterdam, Netherlands
- Date of death: 21 March 2011 (aged 78)
- Place of death: Dordrecht, Netherlands
- Position: Left back

Senior career*
Years	Team	Apps	(Gls)
1949–1954	Ajax		
1954–1958	BVC Amsterdam		
1958–1962	DWS	103	(4)

International career
1952–1954	Netherlands	4	(0)
- * Club domestic league appearances and goals

Hans Boskamp, born Johannes Hendricus Gerardus Hölscher, (7 May 1932 – 21 March 2011) was a Dutch footballer and actor.

== Football career ==
=== Club ===
Rotterdam-born Hölscher moved with his family to Amsterdam at 10 years of age and joined Ajax under his father's stage name Boskamp. He played his first match for the club on 26 March 1950 and his final one on 27 May 1954. He then became a professional with BVC Amsterdam and played his final seasons for DWS.

=== International ===
Boskamp made his debut for the Netherlands in a September 1952 friendly match against Denmark and earned a total of four caps, scoring no goals. His final international was a May 1954 friendly match against Switzerland.

== Entertainment career ==
After retiring as a footballer, Boskamp worked at the Amsterdam stock exchange and later became a singer and actor. He also worked for the Bovema record company and accompanied several big-name artists, among them John Lennon and Yoko Ono during their Bed-In in the Hilton Amsterdam. He also provided the Dutch dub of Sesame Street's Oscar the Grouch.

== Later life and death ==
Boskamp died of a stroke on 21 March 2011, at the age of 78.
