= Marie Line =

French singer

Marie Line, also known as Marie Line Marolany or Maro Lany, is a French singer who took part in the Eurovision Song Contest 1998 for France with the song "Où aller".

== Life and career ==
Marie-Line Marolany was born in Saint-Raphaël, Var on the French Riviera. She has French-Caribbean roots and early on was backing singer in her brothers' group, Soul Afro Punk. She then started to sing her own compositions in piano bars all over in France and then went to record two albums with Raoul Petite. Afterwards she toured Europe with many famous French singer doing backing vocals. In 1998 she was chosen to represent France to the Eurovision Song Contest held in Birmingham, with her song Ou Aller? (Where to?). The song was totally different from the other pop entries and some suggested that it was a reminder of the French "exotic" and "afro-Caribbean" entries of 1991 and 1992. The song was awarded only 3 points (1 point from Cyprus and 2 points from North Macedonia) and ranked 24th doing only better than Switzerland. After that Marie Line did not record any of her songs. She continued her career as a backing vocalist and a composer – she is known for have written music for three French movies: Les Caprices d'un fleuve, Cuisine américaine and Agathe Cléry.

== See also ==
- France in the Eurovision Song Contest

| Preceded by Fanny with Sentiments songes | France in the Eurovision Song Contest; 1998 | Succeeded by Nayah with Je veux donner ma voix |
