= Pieter Goemans =

Dutch composer (1925–2000)

- Goemans in 1970
- Born: 6 June 1925; Amsterdam, Netherlands
- Died: 8 July 2000 (aged 75)
- Occupation: Composer
- Notable work: "Aan de Amsterdamse grachten" (1949)

Pieter Goemans (6 June 1925 – 8 July 2000) was a Dutch composer, probably best known for having written the classic song "Aan de Amsterdamse grachten".

== Biography ==
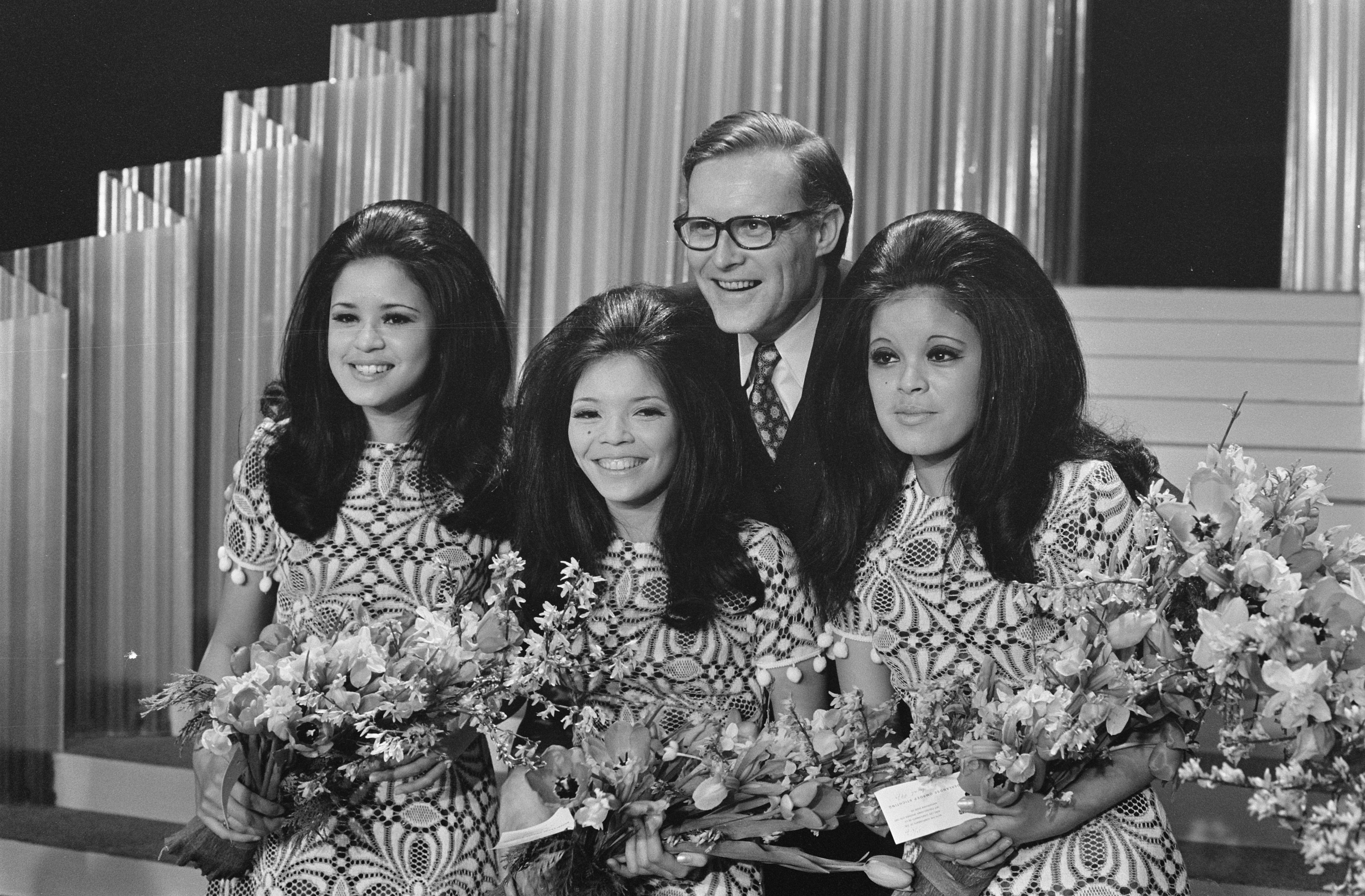
Goemans with the Hearts of Soul at the Eurovision Song Contest, the Hague, 1970

Goemans was born on 6 June 1925 in Amsterdam. The son of a diplomat, his father forced him to write under a pseudonym to avoid any association between the family and the popular entertainment industry. In 1949, under the name Peter Shott, he wrote the song "Aan de Amsterdamse grachten"; Goemans was inspired to write the song in 1949 while walking across the bridge where the Prinsengracht and Leidsegracht canals intersect. It wasn't set to sheet music or recorded until 1956, when an arrangement was written by pianist Dick Schallies (then a member of the Metropole Orkest), because, as Schallies explained, Goemans couldn't write music. Henk Visscher, a singer, guitarist and bassist with John Kraaijkamp Sr., was the first to sing and record the song.

In the 1960s, Goemans was one of the regular lyricists for Corry Brokken, translating foreign material. One of his tunes, "Bach bijvoorbeeld", was sung by Shirley Zwerus and produced by Willem Duys, used as the opening tune for his weekly radio program. In 1970, the Hearts of Soul won the Nationaal Songfestival with Goemans's song "Waterman"; the song finished seventh at the Eurovision Song Contest 1970.

Goemans died on 8 July 2000. The bridge on which "Aan de Amsterdamse grachten" came to him was marked with a plaque and later named for him; his ashes were spread over the Prinsengracht.
