= The Carter Twins =

Irish musical duo

- Origin: Dublin, Ireland
- Genres: Pop music
- Years active: 1996–1998
- Label: BMG Records
- Past members: Anthony Carter; Stephen Carter

The Carter Twins were an Irish musical duo consisting of twin brothers Anthony and Stephen Carter who were active from the late 1990s. They released one studio albums and achieved three top ten singles.

== History ==
In 1996, The Carter Twins were signed by Louis Walsh and won the Smash Hits Newcomers Award in 1996.

In February 1997, The Carter Twins released their debut single "The Twelfth of Never"/"Too Right to Be Wrong". The song peaked at number 7 on the Irish Singles Chart and 61 on the UK Singles Chart. This was followed by a cover of Climie Fisher's "Love Changes" in August 1998 and The Bee Gees' "The First of May" in November 1997. The duo released their debut studio album Number One in late 1997.

In 1998, The Carter Twins entered the Ronan Keating-penned "Make the Change" for Eurosong 1998 in an attempt to represent Ireland in the Eurovision Song Contest 1998. The song placed 4th in the national final.

In July 1998, The Carter Twins released "Let's Go Dancing (Oh La La La)" with "Make the Change" as the B-side. The song peaked at number 6 on the Irish Singles Chart.

== Personal lives ==
In mid-2008, Anthony married Amanda Lynch in Cancun, Mexico.

In February 2011, Stephen married Avril Kelly in County Kildare.

== Discography ==
=== Studio albums ===
List of albums, with selected details
Title	Album details
Number One	Released: late 1997; Label: BMG (74321534112); Formats: CD, cassette

=== Singles ===
List of singles, with selected chart positions, showing year released and album name
Single	Year	Peak chart positions		Album
Single	Year	IRE	UK	Album
"The Twelfth of Never" / "Too Right to Be Wrong"	1997	7	61	Number One
"Love Changes"	1997	5	—	Number One
" The First of May"	1997	30	—	Number One
"Let's Go Dancing (Oh La La La)"	1998	6	—	Non-album single
