= Regula Elsener =

- Born: March 3, 1975 (age 51); Thurgau, Switzerland
- Occupations: Journalist and author
- Children: Two daughters

Regula Elsener (born 3 March 1975) is a Swiss journalist, author and former TV presenter from Schweizer Fernsehen (Swiss television).

== Life ==
Regula Elsener grew up in Thurgau. She has two daughters with her husband. Today she lives with her family near Uster.

== Career ==
As a 15-year-old, Regula Elsener wrote her first newspaper article. After graduating as a commercial clerk, she managed to switch to television at the age of 21. There she hosted various programs such as TAF, Weekend Music, Monte Carlo Circus Festival, Tagesschau Nacht and five times she hosted the Saturday evening show "Ein Abend mit ...."

In 1998, she hosted weather forecasts on RTL Switzerland for some months.

In 2005 she ended her career as a TV presenter. Today she works as a freelance journalist and event host.

== Works ==
- Sex and the City ist nicht alles – wie frau erwachsen wird, Orell Füssli Verlag, Zürich 2005, ISBN 3-280-05150-9.
