= Shirley (Dutch singer) =

Dutch singer and pianist (born 1946)

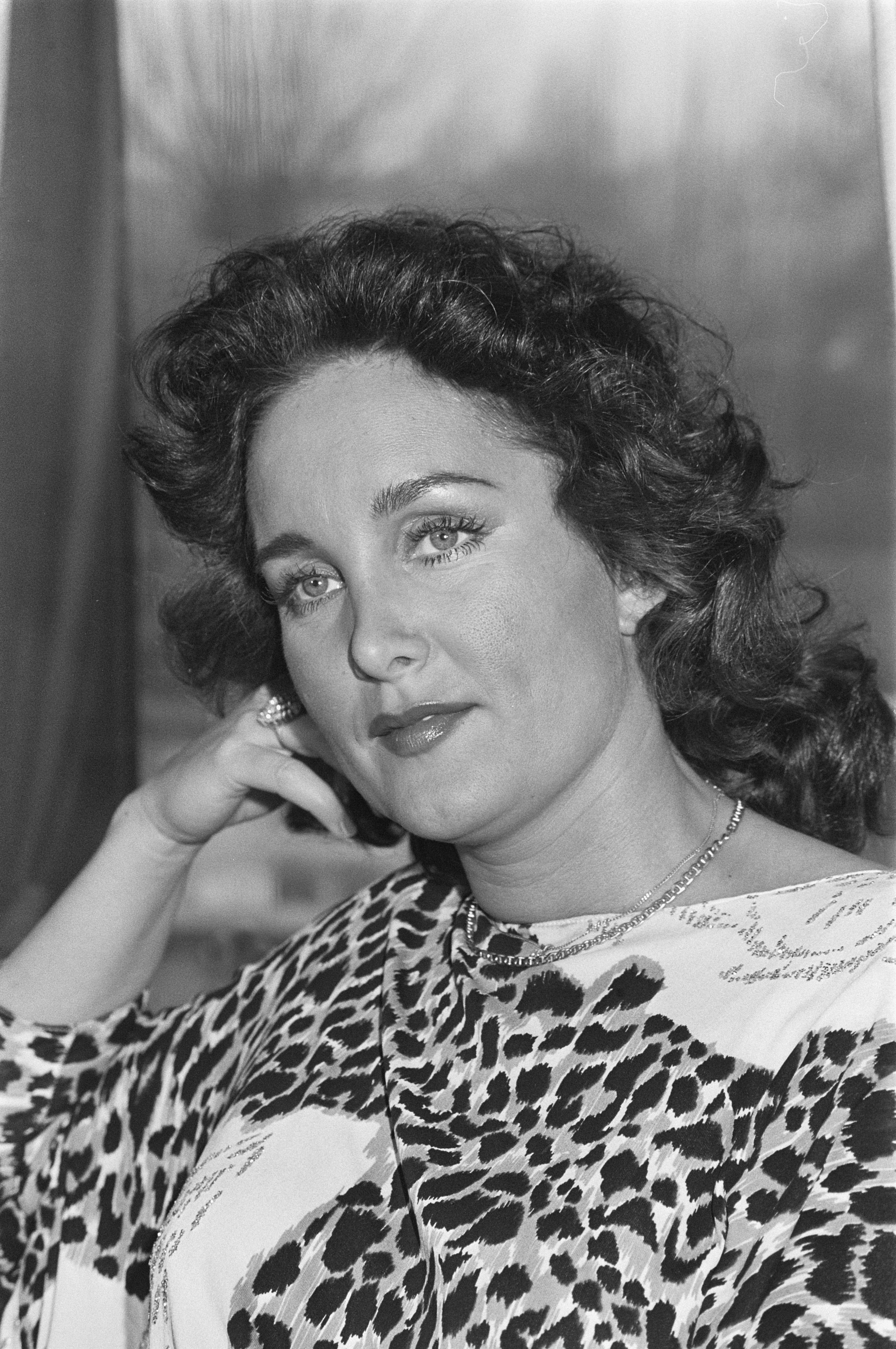
Shirley in 1981

Shirley Zwerus, stage name Shirley (Zandvoort, 22 May 1946) is a Dutch singer and pianist. Her records were released internationally on Fontana Records from 1969.

== Discography ==
=== Albums ===
- 1978: Makin’ Love Is Good for You (als Shirley Zwerus)
  - Have You Ever Seen the Rain / Makin’ Love Is Good for You / The Light I Wanna Be / Save a Little for the Morning / The Next Time // A Bad Case of Rock ’n’ Roll / Fool, Fool / Love Has Tied Our Hearts Together / Giving It Up for Love / Don't Cry Out Loud
- 1981: Shirley
  - Bij jou / Eerste liefde vergeet je nooit / Bloemen bloeien zelfs als het koud is / Jij maakt me so blij / Het is voorbij // Heel even / Oh, het is waar / Nu ik jou niet heb / Dromen van een ander / Zonder woorden

=== Singles ===
- 1958: Maar ondanks dat (Ben jij m’n lieve schat) / Mambo Olé (als Duo Godert en Shirley)
- 1959: Teenager Melody / Jolly Joker (NL #14) (als Shirley and her Rhythms Stars)
- 1959: Vakantie in Honolulu / Mijn Daddy
- 1961: Blue Moon / Besame mucho
- 1961: Spaar me / Wat zou je doen? (B-Seite von Joop van der Marel & Het Leedy Trio)
- 1962: Ya-Ya / Shadows of the Past
- 1963: Zeven witte meeuwen / Mooi zijn de nachten op Ikaria (unter dem Pseudonym Rosemarie)
- 1963: Cimeroni / Toen kwam Johnny
- 1963: Verliefd, verloofd en dan getrouwd / Blondie (Shirley en Tony Ronald)
- 1963: Ich wollt’ ich wär’ Prinzessin / Wer wird der erste sein
- 1964: Ik ga weg / Huil toch om de liefde niet
- 1964: Bitte geh’ / Meinen Mann such’ ich mir selbst aus
- 1964: Vergessen (Remember) / Es war einmal
- 1964: "You're My World" / Who Knows Why
- 1965: Nimm den Kuß als Souvenir / Georgia
- 1965: In Swing and Sweet (EP): Hands Off Him – Misty Moonray / Lost and Lookin’
- 1966: Ik wist allang (dat jij zou komen) (Çe soir je t’attendais) / Georgia
- 1966: Bach bijvoorbeeld / Het orgelconcert
- 1967: No More Love for Me / I Come Another Step Closer to Your Heart (Robert Dahl & Shirley)
- 1967: Big Boss Man / I’m an Evil Gal (Single-Titel: Shirley Goes Soul)
- 1968: Anatole / Ev’ry day
- 1968: That’s Why I Die a Little / Save the Last Dance for Me
- 1970: Fantasy in Fiction / Love Her in the Car (B-Seite von Corner Act ’68; beide Titel aus dem Film Fantasy in Fiction)
- 1971: Amsterdam... het blijft een gezellige stad / Doe ’t met je neus (A: Shirley met leden van het Amsterdams Toneel / B: Shirley & John Brands)
- 1977: It’s Me / I Will Love You (NL #13)
- 1978: Nothing Has Changed / Take Me
- 1978: Persil: Een nieuw geluid (Werbe-Flexidisc)
- 1978: The Light I Wanna Be / Makin’ Love Is Good for You (als Shirley Zwerus)
- 1979: What a Lovely Day / What a Lovely Dub (A-Seite: Errol & Shirley, B-Seite: Errol Ross Orchestra plus vocals Shirley & Errol)
- 1980: Easy Livin’/It's the Only Way / Theme from ‚You're My Future‘ (instr.) (als Shirley Zwerus)
- 1981: Heel even / I'm Sorry (NL #24)
- 1981: Bij jou / Oh, het is waar
- 1981: Eerste liefde vergeet je nooit / Jij maakt me zo blij
- 1982: Een kind, een kind / De jaren van je jeugd (Charity-Single von Lenny, Bonnie, Dimitri, Shirley, Willem & Alexander)
- 1983: The Way Old Friends Do / One and Only
- 1995: Heel even (neue Version) / Soms (If I Have to Go Away) (von Gerard Joling & Shirley Zwerus)
- 1996: Wil je me soms kwijt / Wil je me soms kwijt (instrumentaal)
