= The Well-Known and Some Other Favourite Stories =

Box set by Jill Johnson
- Released: 27 October 2010
- Recorded: 1998–2010
- Genre: Country, country pop, country rock, schlager
- Label: Lionheart International

Jill Johnson chronology
Music Row II (2009)	The Well-Known and Some Other Favourite Stories (2010)	Flirting with Disaster (2011)

The Well-Known and Some Other Favourite Stories is a Jill Johnson box set, released 27 October 2010, consisting of three CDs. The first CD includes some new-written songs, including a vocal duet with Chip Taylor, while the second includes some other "favourites" and the third a live CD from the 2008 Baby Blue Paper tour in Sweden

== Track listing ==
=== The Well-Known ===
1. No Surrender
2. Why'd You Come in Here Lookin' Like That
3. Stumble and Fade Away (new)
4. Angel of the Morning
5. Say Something
6. Jolene
7. Can't Get Enough of You
8. Hopelessly Devoted
9. Someone to flatter (new)
10. Cowboy Up
11. Forever's Going Underground (new)
12. It's a Heartache
13. Desperado
14. Song to Heaven
15. The Heat is On
16. Mother's Jewel
17. Crazy in Love
18. Top of the World
19. Lost Without Yor Love
20. Oh, vilken härlig da'
21. Kärleken är

=== Some Other Favourite Stories ===
1. Roots & Wings
2. Love Ain't Nothin'
3. Don't Feel Like Me
4. Love Lessons
5. When Love Doesn't Love You
6. Nathalie
7. Too Late to be Drinkin'
8. Breakfast in New York
9. Something I Can't Do
10. Better than Me
11. What Happened to us
12. A Woman Knows
13. Baby Blue Paper
14. When Being Who You Are
15. You're Still Here
16. Just Where the Rainbow Ends
17. Just Like You Do
18. Little Girl of Mine
19. It is too Late

=== Baby Blue Paper (live) ===
1. Baby Blue Paper
2. Where the Rainbow Ends
3. You're Looking for Me
4. Roots & Wings
5. I Should Have Left Sooner
6. You Think You're the Man
7. Say Something
8. Don't Feel Like Me
9. What Happened to us
10. When Being Who You Are
11. A Woman Knows
12. You Better Think Again
13. Angel of the Morning
14. Love Lessons
15. Better than Me
16. Papa Come Quick
17. Jolene

== Charts ==
Chart (2010)	Peak position
Sweden (Sverigetopplistan)	2
