= Going Down to the River =

Doug Seegers song

Song by Doug Seegers

from the album Going Down to the River
- Released: 2014
- Recorded: 2014
- Genre: Country music, Soul
- Length: 4:14
- Label: Lionheart Music Group
- Songwriter: Doug Seegers

"Going Down to the River"

Song by Doug Seegers, Jill Johnson and Magnus Carlson

from the album Livemusiken från Jills veranda Nashville
- Released: 2014
- Recorded: 2014
- Genre: Country music, Soul
- Songwriter: Doug Seegers

"Going Down to the River" is a song written, composed and performed by American country music singer, songwriter and guitarist Doug Seegers.

== History ==
Seegers, a struggling street artist in Nashville, Tennessee lived as a homeless musician.

On 17 December 2012, Aaron Espe an American singer-songwriter and record producer based in Nashville uploaded a live 1 minute 11 second rendition of Seegers singing "Going Down to the River" to his own YouTube account. Espe entitled his upload "Who Is Doug Seegers?". The video did not pick up much reaction though.

Doug Seegers became known to the Swedish public with the song when he appeared during the Swedish TV show presented by Jill Johnson titled Jills veranda on 5 March 2014. Jills veranda was a 6-episode SVT TV series recorded in Nashville, where Johnson and six Swedish artists explore the city. At the time the program was recording, its presenters Jill Johnson and Magnus Carlson and the production team from Eyeworks met Seegers who was sitting on a park bench in Nashville. Just minutes earlier, Johnson, was buying food from a street vendor, and the latter upon hearing she was filming a documentary about music in Nashville, recommended that they give a listen to a street musician just across the street telling her "You have to hear him, he has the most unique voice in country music". Johnson took the advice and headed towards Seegers. Doug Seegers performed his own song "Going Down to the River".

Johnson and Carlson loved his performance of the song so much that they returned some time later and offered to record the song with him. Doug Seegers gained instant popularity after the episode was broadcast with Seegers' live performance. His Facebook account was inundated by new Swedish fans and the song "Going Down to the River" was number 1 on Swedish iTunes Charts for 12 consecutive days.

A studio-recorded version in Johnny Cash's old studio in Nashville first appeared on the album Livemusiken från Jills veranda Nashville with two versions, one with vocals of Doug Seegers alone, and another a vocal collaboration with Seegers, Jill Johnson and Magnus Carlson singing various verses. The album included another track from Seegers titled "Gotta Catch That Train" as a bonus track. The album reached number one on Sverigetopplistan, the official Swedish Albums Chart and was certified gold.

Doug Seegers was soon offered a recording contract with Lionheart Music Group resulting in the release of his debut album that included the song in a new recording with only his vocals. The album appropriately also titled Going Down to the River on Lionheart Music Group, was released on 28 May 2014 reaching number one in the Sverigetopplistan chart on 5 June 2014, its first week of release and again on the August 14, 2014 chart. It was certified gold.

== Collaborations ==
The album had collaborations from Emmylou Harris in a cover of Gram Parsons' hit "She" and Buddy Miller a friend of Seegers' from his Austin days in "There'll Be No Teardrops Tonight". The album was produced by Will Kimbrough. Seeger's album also Seegers was engaged on a 60-gig tour in Sweden and appeared at Sverige sommaren 2014, a major music festival in Sweden.

== Certifications ==
Certifications for "Going Down to the River"
Region	Certification	Certified units/sales
Sweden (GLF)	Gold	20,000^{‡}
^{‡} Sales+streaming figures based on certification alone.
