= Going Down to the River (album) =

Studio album by Doug Seegers
- Released: May 28, 2014
- Genre: Country music
- Label: Lionheart Music Group

Going Down to the River is a debut album by American country music singer, songwriter and guitarist Doug Seegers.

Seegers, a struggling street artist in Nashville, Tennessee, basically lived as a homeless musician, when he became known to the Swedish public. He sang the album's title song when appearing on a Swedish TV show hosted by Jill Johnson and called Jills veranda March 5, 2014. Jills veranda was a 6-episode SVT TV series recorded in Nashville, where Johnson and six altering Swedish artists were exploring the city. Johnson and one of her guest musicians Magnus Carlson loved Doug Seegers singing performance so much that they returned some time later and offered to record the song with him.

Doug Seegers was soon offered a recording contract with Lionheart Music Group resulting in the release of his debut album that included the song in a new recording with only his vocals. The album appropriately also titled Going Down to the River on Lionheart Music Group, was released on 28 May 2014 reaching number one in the Sverigetopplistan chart on 5 June 2014, its first week of release. It was certified gold.

The album had collaborations from Emmylou Harris in a cover of Gram Parsons' hit "She" and Buddy Miller a friend of Seegers' from his Austin days. The album was produced by Will Kimbrough. Seeger's album also Seegers was engaged on a 60-gig tour in Sweden and appeared at Sverige sommaren 2014, a major music festival in Sweden.

== Commercial performance ==
In the US, the album was released on October 7, 2014, and debuted at No. 25 on the Top Country Albums chart with 1,900 copies sold for the week.

The album was released in Sweden in May 2014, and reached No. 1 on Sverigetopplistan album chart. It returned to the top of Sverigetopplistan for an additional week on the chart dated 14 August 2014 and a third time on 2 October 2014.

== Track listing ==
1. "Angie's Song" (3:29)
2. "Going Down to the River" (4:14)
3. "She" (feat. Emmylou Harris) (4:36)
4. "Lonely Drifter's Cry" (3:37)
5. "Hard Working Man" (3:28)
6. "Pour Me" (3:42)
7. "There'll Be No Teardrops Tonight" (feat. Buddy Miller) (2:34)
8. "Memory Lane" (3:15)
9. "Gotta Catch That Train" (2:36)
10. "Burning a Hole in My Pocket" (4:00)
11. "She's in a Rock 'n' Roll Band" (3:29)
12. "Baby Lost Her Way Home Again" (2:38)

== Charts ==
=== Weekly charts ===
Chart (2014)	Peak position
Swedish Albums (Sverigetopplistan)	1
US Top Country Albums (Billboard)	25
US Heatseekers Albums (Billboard)	9

=== Year-end charts ===
Chart (2014)	Position
Swedish Albums (Sverigetopplistan)	6

== Certifications ==
Region	Certification	Certified units/sales
Sweden (GLF)	Platinum	40,000^{‡}
^{‡} Sales+streaming figures based on certification alone.
