= Livemusiken från Jills veranda =

Studio album by Jill Johnson
- Released: March 2014
- Recorded: 2013–2014
- Genre: Country
- Label: Universal Music

Jill Johnson chronology
Duetterna (2013)	Livemusiken från Jills veranda (2014)	Songs for Daddy (2014)

Livemusiken från Jills veranda (meaning live music from Jill's porch) is a country music album resulting from the Swedish television Jills veranda where Swedish singer Jill Johnson visits Nashville, Tennessee to shoot a documentary in six episodes about Nashville's music and culture.

A collaboration with a number of Swedish artists, the album, a cover of renowned country music classics, also introduced very notably to the [Swedish] public three recordings by the American homeless country music singer, songwriter and guitarist Doug Seegers in three original tracks including two versions of Seegers' own composition "Going Down to the River" plus the bonus "Gotta Catch That Train" by him.

The album topped Sverigetopplistan, the official Swedish Albums Chart in its week of release and was certified gold.

== Track list ==
1. "Going Down to the River" – Doug Seegers – 3:17
2. "Color Him Father" – Jill Johnson feat. Titiyo – 3:00
3. "Orphan Girl" – Jill Johnson feat. Titiyo – 3:00
4. "Red Dirt Girl" – Jill Johnson feat. Kakan Hermansson
5. "Not Ready to Make Nice" – Jill Johnson feat. Kakan Hermansson – 3:38
6. "Du" – Jill Johnson – 3:44
7. "Jolene" – Jill Johnson feat. Rikard "Skizz" Bizzi – 3:47
8. "Crazy Girl" – Jill Johnson feat. Rikard "Skizz" Bizzi – 3:14
9. "Will the Circle Be Unbroken" – Jill Johnson feat. Marit Bergman – 5:14
10. "Never You" – Pam Rose & Lisa Carver – 4:33
11. "Blue Eyes Crying in the Rain" – Jill Johnson feat. Kristian Gidlund – 2:44
12. "Follow the Lights" – Jill Johnson feat. Kristian Gidlund – 3:08
13. "Always on My Mind – Jill Johnson feat. Magnus Carlson – 4:05
14. "Sleepless Nights" – Jill Johnson feat. Magnus Carlson – 3:04
15. "Night Flyer" – Jill Johnson feat. Kristian Gidlund – 2:52
16. "Going Down to the River" Doug Rivers, Jill Johnson & Magnus Carlson – 3:24
17. "Crying Time" – Jill Johnson feat. Magnus Carlson (Bonus track)
18. "Gotta Catch That Train" – Doug Seegers (Bonus track)

== Charts ==
Chart (2014)	Peak position
Swedish Albums (Sverigetopplistan)	1
