= Discography (Jill Johnson album) =

Compilation album by Jill Johnson
- Released: 27 March 2003
- Recorded: 1996–2003
- Genre: Country

Jill Johnson chronology
Good Girl (2002)	Discography (2003)	Roots and Wings (2003)

Discography was released on 27 March 2003 and is a compilation album from Swedish pop and country singer Jill Johnson. It peaked at number four on the Swedish Albums Chart.

== Track listing ==
1. Crazy in Love - 3:00
2. Desperado - 3:38
3. What's Wrong with You - 4:41
4. Good Girl - 3:04
5. Moonlight and Roses - 3:21
6. Jump in a Car - 3:43
7. Just Like You Do - 3:40
8. Luckiest People - 4:16
9. Mothers Jewel - 3:38
10. My Love for You - 4:40
11. Secrets in my Life - 3:29
12. It's too Late - 3:20
13. Everybody's Confidante - 4:07
14. I'll Be There (with Michael Ruff) - 4:12
15. Kärleken är - 3:00
16. Tell Me Why 4:05 (with Annika Ljungberg)
17. Jag har havet ett stenkast från mig - 3:33
18. Kommer tid, kommer vår - 4:39
19. All Kinds of People 3:31
20. Shake the Sugartree - 3:17

== Charts ==
=== Weekly charts ===
Chart (2003–2004)	Peak position
Swedish Albums (Sverigetopplistan)	4

=== Year-end charts ===
Chart (2003)	Position
Swedish Albums (Sverigetopplistan)	80
