= Doug Seegers =

American singer-songwriter (born c.1952)

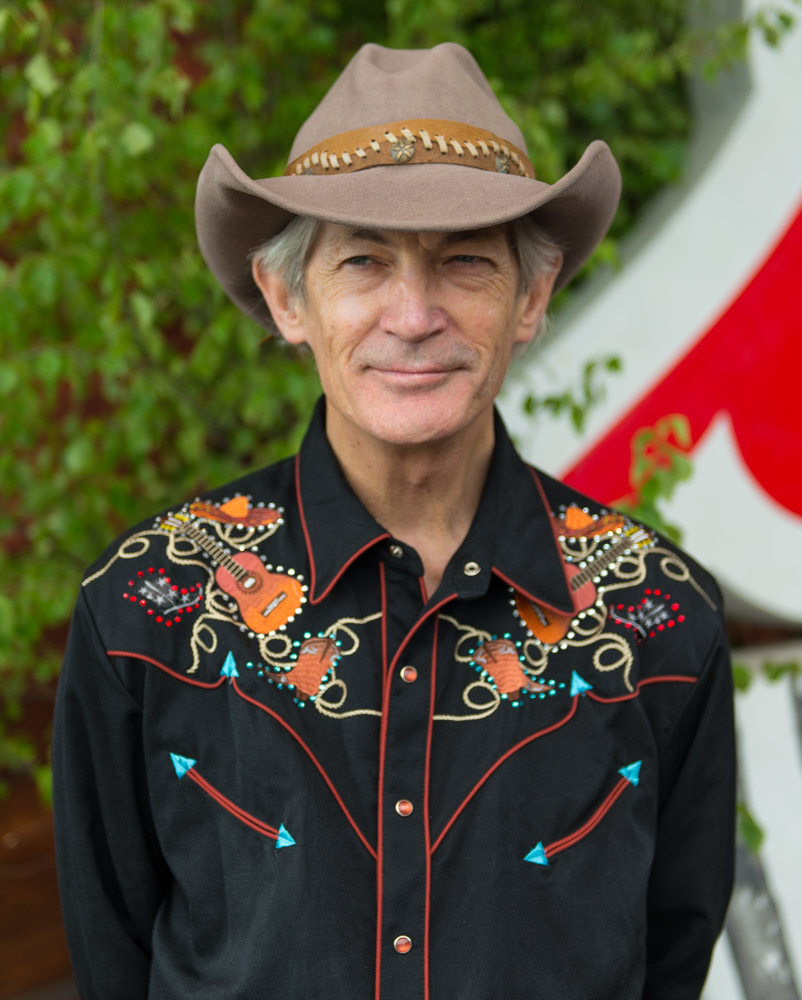
- Doug Seegers before Allsång på Skansen in 2015

Background information
- Born: 1952 (age 73–74); Long Island, New York, United States
- Genres: Country
- Occupations: Singer, musician, songwriter
- Instrument: Guitar
- Years active: 2014-present
- Label: Lionheart

Douglas Seegers (born c. 1952 in Long Island, New York, United States) is an American country music artist, guitarist and songwriter.

== Life and work ==
Seegers graduated from West Islip High School and started playing music in New York and Austin, Texas, before moving to upstate New York, where he married and raised two children. Eventually, he went alone to Nashville, where he played on the streets and became a regular at The Little Pantry That Could, a West Nashville charity that holds regular songwriter nights. He lived as a homeless struggling musician.

On 17 December 2012, Aaron Espe, an American singer-songwriter and record producer based in Nashville, uploaded a live 1 minute 11 second rendition of Seegers singing "Going Down to the River" on his own YouTube account. Espe entitled his upload "Who Is Doug Seegers?". The video did not pick up much reaction.

Seegers became known to the Swedish public when he appeared on the Swedish TV show Jills veranda, presented by Jill Johnson, on 5 March 2014. Jills veranda was a 6-episode SVT TV series recorded in Nashville, in which Johnson and six Swedish artists explored the city. At the time the program was recording, its Johnson, her guest Magnus Carlson and the production team from Eyeworks met Seegers who was sitting on a park bench in Nashville. Minutes earlier, Johnson was buying food from a street vendor and the latter, hearing she was filming a documentary about music in Nashville, recommended that they listen to a street musician across the street telling her, "You have to hear him, he has the most unique voice in country music." Johnson went to Seegers who performed his own song, "Going Down to the River". Johnson and Carlson loved his performance so much that they returned some time later and offered to record the song with him in Johnny Cash's old studio in Nashville.

Seegers gained instant popularity after the episode was broadcast. His Facebook account was inundated by new Swedish fans and "Going Down to the River" was number 1 on the Swedish iTunes Charts for 12 consecutive days. The track also appeared on Johnson's album, Livemusiken från Jills Veranda Nashville, which topped Sverigetopplistan, the official Swedish Albums Chart, and was certified gold.

Seegers was offered a recording contract with Lionheart Music Group resulting in the release of his first album also titled Going Down to the River on Lionheart Music Group. It was released on 28 May 2014. The album had collaborations from Emmylou Harris in a cover of Gram Parsons' hit "She" and Buddy Miller, a friend of Seegers' from his Austin days, in "There'll Be No Teardrops Tonight". The album was produced by Will Kimbrough. Seeger's album also reached number one in the Sverigetopplistan chart on 5 June 2014, its first week of release and again on the 14 August 2014 chart. It was certified gold. Seegers was engaged on a 70-gig summer tour of Sweden and appeared at Stockholm Music & Arts 2014, a music festival in Sweden.

In March 2015, he released a joint album with Johnson, In Tandem, on the Capitol Music Group / Universal Records label.

== Discography ==
=== Albums ===
Title	Album details	Peak chart positions			Certifications
Title	Album details	US Country	US Heat	SWE	Certifications
Going Down to the River	Release date: May 28, 2014; Label: Lionheart Music Group	25	9	1	SWE: Gold
In Tandem (with Jill Johnson)	Release date: March 2015; Label: Capitol Music Group	–	–	1	
Let's All Go Christmas Caroling Tonight	Release: October 2015; Label: Lionheart Music Group	–	–	7	
Walking on the Edge of the World	Release: May 27, 2016; Label: Capitol Music Group	–	–	5	
Sings Hank Williams	Release: May 26, 2017; Label: Capitol Music Group	–	–	7	
A Story I Got to Tell	Release: May 31, 2019; Label: BMG	–	–	–	

Appearances on compilation albums

- 2014: Livemusiken från Jills Veranda Nashville (#1 on Sverigetopplistan Swedish Albums Chart)
  - Track 1: "Going Down to the River" – Doug Seegers - 3:17
  - Track 17: "Going Down to the River" – Doug Seegers, Jill Johnson & Magnus Carlson (Bonus track)
  - Track 18: "Gotta Catch That Train" – Doug Seegers (Bonus track)

=== Singles ===
Year	Album	Peak positions	Notes
Year	Album	SWE	Notes
2014	"Going Down to the River"	–	(#1 on Swedish iTunes chart)

=== Music videos ===
Year	Video	Director
2015	"Angie's Song"	Gregg Roth
