= Down in the River to Pray =

American folk hymn

- Sheet music cover

Song
- Published: 1867
- Genre: Gospel music
- Songwriter: Traditional

"Down in the River to Pray" (Roud 4928, also known as "Down to the River to Pray," "Down in the Valley to Pray," "The Good Old Way," and "Come, Let Us All Go Down") is a traditional American song variously described as a Christian folk hymn, an African-American spiritual, an Appalachian song, and a Southern gospel song. The exact origin of the song is unknown. The most famous version, featured in O Brother Where Art Thou?, uses a pentatonic scale, common in many African American spirituals.

== Lyrics and versions ==
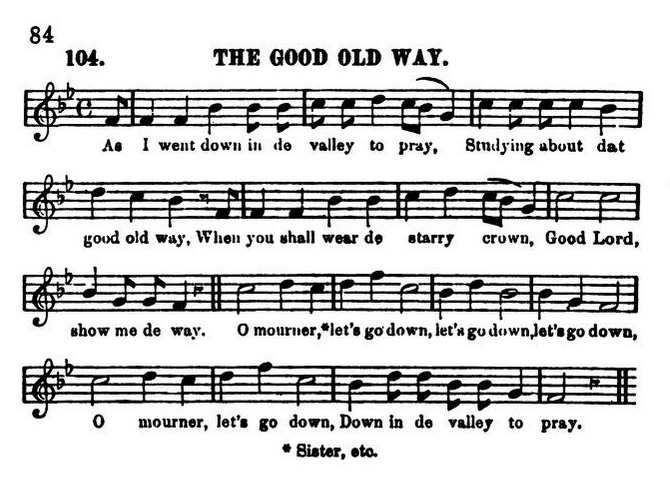
Earliest known form of the song, from Slave Songs of the United States

The earliest known version of the song, titled "The Good Old Way," was published in Slave Songs of the United States in 1867. The song (#104) was contributed to that book by George H. Allan of Nashville, Tennessee, who may also have been the transcriber. The lyrics printed in this collection are:

As I went down in the valley to pray,
Studying about that good old way,
When you shall wear the starry crown,
Good Lord, show me the way.
O mourner, let's go down, let's go down, let's go down,
O mourner, let's go down,
Down in the valley to pray

Another version, titled "Come, Let Us All Go Down," was published in 1880 in The Story of the Jubilee Singers; With Their Songs, a book about the Fisk Jubilee Singers.

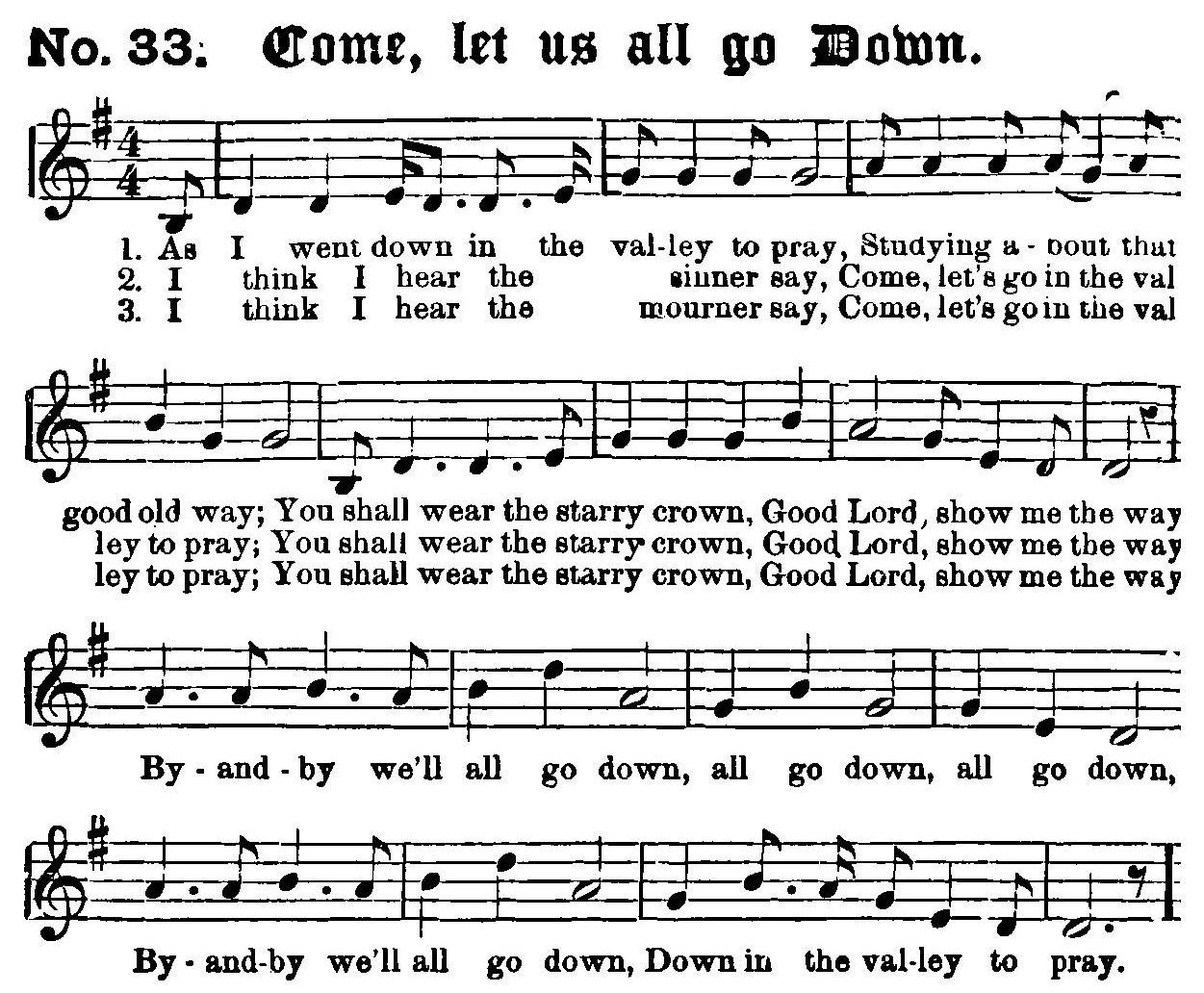
Version of the song as sung by the Fisk Jubilee Singers

This version also refers to a valley rather than a river; the first verse is:

As I went down in the valley to pray,
Studying about that good old way;
You shall wear the starry crown,
Good Lord, show me the way.
By-and-by we'll all go down, all go down, all go down,
By-and-by we'll all go down,
Down in the valley to pray.

In some versions, "in the river" is replaced by "to the river". The phrase "in the river" is significant, for two reasons. The more obvious reason is that the song has often been sung at outdoor baptisms (such as the full-immersion baptism depicted in the 2000 film O Brother, Where Art Thou?). Another reason is that many songs sung by victims of slavery contained coded messages for escaping. When the enslaved people escaped, they would walk in the river because the water would cover their scent from the bounty-hunters' dogs. And "Good Lord, show me the way" could be a prayer for God's guidance to find the escape route, commonly known as "the Underground Railroad."

=== Mistaken attributions ===
Some sources mistakenly claim that the song was published in The Southern Harmony and Musical Companion in 1835, several decades before the effort to gather and publish Black spirituals gained momentum in the Reconstruction Era. There is in fact a song called "The Good Old Way" in The Southern Harmony (also found in the Sacred Harp); that song, however, has completely different melody and lyrics (which likewise should not be confused with a Manx hymn tune of the same name and text, made famous by the Watersons). Its lyrics begin as follows:

Lift up your heads, Immanuel's friends
And taste the pleasure Jesus sends
Let nothing cause you to delay
But hasten on the good old way

== Notable recordings ==
- 1927: Price Family Sacred Singers (Okeh 40796)
- 1929: Delta Big Four from Screamin' and Hollerin' the Blues: The Worlds of Charley Patton (Gennett Records)
- 1940: Lead Belly from Let It Shine On Me -- The Library Of Congress Recordings, V. 3 (New Rounder)
- 1966: Doc Watson from Home Again! (Vanguard Records)
- 1970: Arlo Guthrie, single, Reprise Records 0951
- 2000: Alison Krauss from O Brother, Where Art Thou? (Lost Highway/Mercury)
- 2002: Little Axe from Hard Grind (On-U Sound)
- 2003: Doc Watson, Ricky Skaggs and Alison Krauss from The Three Pickers (Rounder / Umgd)
- 2004: The Spooky Men's Chorale on their CD Tooled up
- 2005: The King's Singers from Six (Signum UK)
- 2005: Jill Johnson from The Christmas in You (Lionheart Records)
- 2009: Mormon Tabernacle Choir from Come Thou Fount of Every Blessing: American Folk Hymns & Spirituals (Mormon Tabernacle Choir)
- 2010: The National Lutheran Choir from Hymns We love to Sing - Volume Two (The National Lutheran Choir)
- 2012: Sonya Isaacs from Hymns from the Old Country Church (Spring Hill Music Group)
- 2014: Nia Frazier performed a solo to a version of the song on Lifetime's Dance Moms
- 2014: Noah Gundersen partially covered the song on his 2014 album "Ledges". It was titled "Poor Man's Son."
- 2015: DeAnna Johnson performed on The Voice.
- 2015: Pacific Boychoir Academy and Kevin Fox performed on The Kenyon Family episode of The Blacklist.
- 2016: Michael W. Smith from Hymns II - Shine On Us.
- 2018 The Jason Lovins Band album Songs From Sunday-Volume 3
- 2020: Greg Jong for the Wasteland 3 soundtrack (INgrooves / inXile Entertainment)
- 2022: The Petersens from My Ozark Mountain Home (The Petersens)

== See also ==
- Songs of the Underground Railroad
