= Mark Evitts =

American musician

Col. Mark Evitts
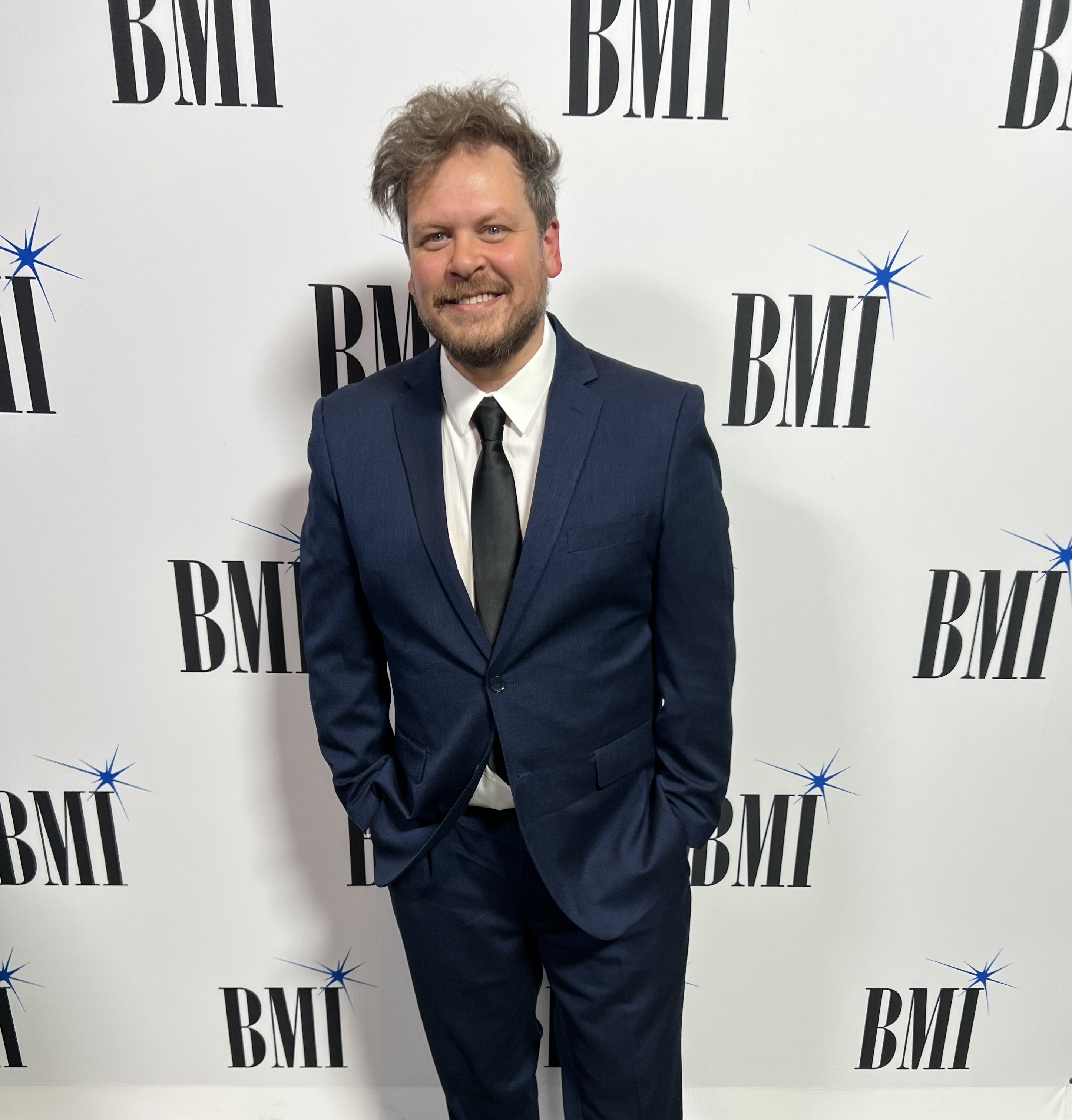
- Evitts at the 2023 BMI Awards in Los Angeles, California
- Born: July 14, 1981 (age 45); Paducah, Kentucky, U.S.
- Education: Murray State University; Berklee College of Music (BA)
- Occupations: Composer; record producer; musician; songwriter
- Years active: 1996–present
- Honours: Kentucky Colonel
- Website: markevitts.com

Mark Steven Evitts is an Emmy award-winning American composer, producer, songwriter, and multi-instrumentalist. His work spans television, film, and music working on shows for Apple TV+, Netflix, and artists like Nas, Hit-Boy, G Herbo, Train, Blues Traveler, Rodney Atkins, The Band Perry, Drew Seeley, Jaida Dreyer, We the Kings, among many others.

In 2025 Evitts won a Children's and Family Emmy Awards for his music direction of Apple TV+'s animated program Frog and Toad.

== Early life and education ==
A Kentucky native, Evitts began his classical music training at age twelve with the Concertmaster of the Paducah Symphony Orchestra, Kathy McCann Gardner. In 1999, he went to Murray State University where he met mandolinist, Chris Thile. Evitts left Murray State University after only a semester. In 2006, he began touring with the band Scarlet Kings (previously Oval Opus) until 2009. In 2010, he ventured into film as the musical director and producer for the documentary Newport. He went back to school to finish his degree and is a 2024 graduate of Berklee College of Music.

== Career ==
In April 2023, Frog and Toad released as a series on Apple TV+, in which Evitts was the composer and songwriter. Speaking of Evitts's original song for the show about Ice Cream, in which Tom Kenny sang the lead, Laura Zornosa of Time said, "It’s an earworm song—one that’s easy to imagine kids requesting again and again." In December 2024, The Academy of Television Arts & Sciences announced that Frog and Toad's 2nd season would be nominated for three Emmy Awards: Preschool Animated Series, Music Direction and Composition for an Animated Program, and Editing for a Preschool Animated Program. At the 3rd Children's and Family Emmy Awards, Frog and Toad won the Emmy for Music Direction and Composition.

In 2021, Evitts was a co-writer on the Nas (feat. Blxst) single, "Brunch on Sundays" for the Grammy nominated rap album, King's Disease II. Evitts also recorded on Joey + Rory's RIAA certified Gold selling, Grammy winning album, "Hymns", as well as working with producers Sam Hollander and Josh Edmondson on ten episodes of NBC's Smash, including the Emmy nominated original song, "I Heard Your Voice In a Dream".

Evitts co-wrote additional music with film composer Alex Geringas on the Netflix Animation feature film Arlo the Alligator Boy. He has been an arranger, musician and music producer on several hit television shows, including The Bachelor, Nashville, Blood & Oil, the BBC documentary, Love In A Day, Discovering Lucy Angel, SVT's award winner documentary series Jills veranda, as well as films such as Summer Forever and Finding Your Feet.

In addition to his original compositions and arranging, Evitts was also in the trio, St. Alban consisting of himself, Peter McVeigh of Belfast, Northern Ireland, and Andy Dunlop (guitarist for Travis) of Glasgow, Scotland. Their self-titled debut album was BBC Radio's Album of the Week.

== Honors ==
In 2022, Evitts was commissioned a Kentucky Colonel by Kentucky governor, Andy Beshear. In May 2024, Evitts was inducted into the Paducah Tilghman High School Hall of Fame.

== Selected film and television ==
Year	Film/TV Title	Network/Distributor	Credits	Notables for Film/TV Series
2024	The Runt		Composer	Dances with Films - Grand Jury Award; Indy Film Fest - Best of American Spectrum - Best Narrative Short Film; Lonestar Film Festival - Best Short Film; Wyoming International Film Festival - Best Screenplay Short Film
2024	Frog and Toad	Apple TV+	Series Composer/Songwriter	3rd Children's and Family Emmy Awards - Frog and Toad (Winner) Music Direction and Composition for an Animated Program; Preschool Animated Series (Nominee); Editing for a Preschool Animated Program (Nominee)
2023	Frog and Toad	Apple TV+	Series Composer/Songwriter	Common Sense Media Best Kids TV Show of 2023; 2nd Children's and Family Emmy Awards - (Nominee) Editing for a Preschool Animated Program
2021	Arlo the Alligator Boy	Netflix	Additional Music Composer	
2020	Jills veranda (Season 4)	Sveriges Television	Violin, Viola, Mandolin, Arranger	
2018	Christmas Under The Stars	BYU TV	String Arranger, String Samples, Engineer	
2018	Finding Your Feet	Entertainment One FilmsRoadside Attractions	String Arranger, Strings, Engineer	
2017	Love In A Day	BBC One	String Arranger, Violins, Viola, Engineer	
2017	Jills veranda (Season 3)	Sveriges Television	Fiddle	
2016	The Bachelor (Season 20)	American Broadcasting Company (ABC)	Mandolin	
2015	Jills veranda (Season 2)	Sveriges Television	Fiddle, Viola, Arranger	
2015	Summer Forever	Maker Studios	String Arranger, Strings, Engineer	
2015	Nashville (Season 3)	American Broadcasting Company (ABC)	Mandolin	
2015	Blood & Oil (Season 1)	American Broadcasting Company (ABC)	String Arranger, Strings, Engineer	
2012	Smash (Season 2)	NBC	String Arrangements, Violins, Violas, Cellos	Primetime Emmy Award for Outstanding Original Music and Lyrics, for "I Heard Your Voice In a Dream"
2012	New Year's Eve with Carson Daly	NBC	String Arranger, Violins, Violas, Engineer	
2011	Before Vegas, There Was Newport	PBS	Composer, music director, Music Producer, String Arranger, Violins, Violas, Fiddle, Mandolin, Engineer	

== Selected discography ==
Year	Album/Song Title	Artist	Credits	Label	Notables
2023	Birthday Cake	Dylan Conrique	Strings	KYN Entertainment	RIAA certification GOLD Single; 100 Million Streams
2023	White Buffalo "Horses and Weed"	Ian Munsick	Fiddle	Warner Music Group	
2023	Frog and Toad: Season 1 (Apple Original Series Soundtrack)	Mark Evitts	Composer, Producer	Apple TV	
2021	King's Disease II "Brunch on Sundays"	Nas feat. Blxst	Composer	Mass Appeal Records	2022 Grammy nominated "Best Rap Album"; #1 US Billboard Top R&B/Hip-Hop Albums; #1 US Billboard Top Rap Albums; #1 iTunes; #3 US Billboard 200
2021	Judas and the Black Messiah The Inspired Album "Revolutionary"	G Herbo featuring Bump J	Composer	RCA Records	#1 US Billboard Soundtrack Albums; #12 US Billboard 200; #32 Canadian Albums (Billboard)
2020	St. Alban	St. Alban	Composer, Strings, Mandolin, Engineer		BBC Radio Album of the Week
2019	Caught Up in the Country	Rodney Atkins	Fiddle, Strings	Curb Records	
2018	Wind	Sister Hazel	String Arranger, Violins, Violas, Engineer	Croakin' Poets Records	#1 iTunes
2017	"Shed a Light" (Remixes 2)	David Guetta, Robin Schulz, Cheat Codes (DJs), Mokita	String Arranger, Strings, Engineer	Warner Music Group	
2016	Hymns That Are Important to Us	Joey + Rory	String Arranger, Violins, Viola, Engineer	Gaither Music Group	#1 Billboard Country Albums; #1 Billboard Christian Albums; #4 Billboard 200; Grammy Award for Best Roots Gospel Album; RIAA certification GOLD Album; RIAA certification GOLD Video Longform
2015	Blow Up the Moon	Blues Traveler ft. Jewel (singer), Secondhand Serenade	Violins, Violas, Cellos	Loud and Proud Records	
2013	Waiting for the Dawn	The Mowgli's	Fiddle, Mandolin, Tenor Guitar	Def Jam Recordings	#2 Billboard Heatseeksers
2011	Sunshine State of Mind	We the Kings	Strings	S-Curve Records	#5 Alternative Songs; #9 Billboard Rock Chart

== Tours ==
Year	Artist	Tour Name	Label	Countries
2018-2019	Rodney Atkins	Caught Up In The Country	Curb Records	United States; Germany
2016-2018	Rodney Atkins	These Are My People	Curb Records	United States; Germany
2014-2015	Caroline Larsson and Music City Band	Nashville Country Night	Weeki Records	Sweden; Denmark
2015	Caroline Larsson and Music City Band	Nashville Christmas Night	Weeki Records	Sweden; Denmark
2013-2015	Lindsay Lawler	Highway Angel		United States
2013-2014	Lisa-Marie Fischer	Holding On	Stevja Records	Germany; Switzerland
2012-2013	Lisa-Marie Fischer	Sugar and Salt	Stevja Records	Germany; Switzerland
2011-2012	Lisa-Marie Fischer	Introducing Lisa-Marie Fischer	Stevja Records	Germany; Switzerland
2012-2013	Jaida Dreyer	Guy's Girl	Streamsound Records	United States
2011	Jimmy Wayne	Sara Smile		United States
2010	Trip Lee	Between Two Worlds	Reach Records	United States
2009-2010	Rodney Atkins	It's America	Curb Records	United States
2008	Rodney Atkins	Cowboy Town (Support for Brooks & Dunn, ZZ Top)	Curb Records	United States
