= The Woman I've Become =

The Woman I've Become may refer to:

- The Woman I've Become (album), a 2006 album by Jill Johnson
- The Woman I've Become (EP), a 2021 EP by Jessie James Decker
