= Changed (album) =

Studio album by Rascal Flatts
- Released: April 3, 2012
- Genre: Country
- Length: 44:08 (Standard Edition); 58:08 (Deluxe Edition)
- Label: Big Machine
- Producers: Dann Huff; Rascal Flatts

Rascal Flatts chronology
The Best of Rascal Flatts Live (2011)	Changed (2012)	Rewind (2014)

Singles from Changed
- 1. "Banjo" Released: January 16, 2012; 2. "Come Wake Me Up" Released: May 21, 2012; 3. "Changed" Released: December 17, 2012; 4. "Sunrise" Released: June 28, 2013

Changed is the eighth studio album by American country music group Rascal Flatts. It is their second studio album released on Big Machine Records, and was released on April 3, 2012. The band released the album's debut single, "Banjo", on January 16, 2012. The album's second single "Come Wake Me Up" released to country radio on May 21, 2012. The album's third single, "Changed", released to country radio on December 17, 2012, AC and Christian AC on January 22, 2013. On June 28, 2013, Rascal Flatts released "Sunrise" as their first official single in the UK. This is the first album from the group to not have a Top 40 hit on the pop chart. This is the group's first album not to go platinum and last to go gold.

== Content ==
Gary LeVox explains the title, "Actually there's a song on the album called "Changed" and it's a really, really special song. And we thought that title of that song really captures what this new season of our career is because everything in our professional career has changed...(we) thought the title was appropriate." Rascal Flatts worked with long-time producer Dann Huff on their new album but also produced a few of the tracks on their own.

The Limited Deluxe Edition 'ZinePak includes the 15-song Changed Deluxe CD, an exclusive 72-page magazine, and a set of four Rascal Flatts guitar picks. The magazine includes exclusive interviews with the band, rare photographs, lyrics, commentary on the band's career and more. 40,000 copies were made available. The Limited Deluxe Edition version was exclusively available at Wal-Mart stores. In the weeks leading up to the album's release, three promotional singles were released for music download; the title track was released on March 13, 2012, "Hot In Here" on March 20, 2012, and "She's Leaving" on March 27, 2012.

Joe Don Rooney told Taste of Country that he believed Changed was the trio's best album to that point in their career, saying: "We joke that it's taken us 12 years and eight albums to make this album. We've been through a lot and I think the hardcore fan can hear it in this album. I think it's our strongest record to date. It's exactly what the three of us are about musically."

== Commercial performance ==
In the United States, the album debuted at No. 3 on the Billboard 200 with first-week sales of 130,000 copies. It also was the trio's seventh consecutive album to debut at No. 1 on the Billboard Country Albums chart, making them only the fourth act in Nielsen Soundscan history to attain this goal. As of April 3, 2013, the album has sold 502,000 copies in the US.

In Australia, Changed made its debut on the ARIA albums at No. 51 and peaked at No. 2, the band's highest position on the ARIA country chart to date. On January 11, 2013, Changed debuted on the Swedish Albums Chart at No. 14. It is the band's first appearance and highest position on the Swedish Albums Chart to date. In the United Kingdom, "Changed" debuted on the Official UK Albums Top 100 chart at No. 87 and No. 1 on the Country Artist Albums Top 20 chart.

As of April 2014, the album has sold 560,000 copies in the United States.

== Critical reception ==
Professional ratings
Review scores
Source	Rating
AllMusic	3/5 stars
Associated Press	(positive)
Country Weekly	3.5/5 stars
Roughstock	4/5 stars
Taste of Country	4/5 stars
Under The Gun Review	7/10
USA Today	3/5 stars
The New York Times	(positive)
About.com	3/5 stars
ukCOUNTRYmusic.NET	9/10 stars

Billy Dukes of Taste of Country gave the album four stars out of five, saying that it was true that Changed is the most country project they've released in 10 years, and there are some new approaches on tracks like "Sunrise" and "Let It Hurt", on which he notes, "The second verse of this dark, brooding ballad is brilliant, and LeVox goes somewhere deep to bring it to life." Matt Bjorke of Roughstock gave it four stars out of five, saying, "Changed represents the continuation of a new chapter for the trio in their career and while the songs on the album don't represent the "change" some critics and some fans may have hoped for, what they have done is provide their loyal set of fans and other country fans a strong, consistent album of radio-ready material and something that can compete with the bands chompin' at their feet to take their place as the #1 band in country music."" Jessica Nicholson of Country Weekly gave the release three-and-a-half stars out of five, saying that "the album lacks some of the energy and freshness of 2010's Nothing Like This, but introspective tunes such as "A Little Home," "Sunrise" and "Come Wake Me Up" add even more depth to the trio's sound." AllMusic's Stephen Thomas Erlewine gave the album three out of five stars, saying the album "errs on the side of caution" and "toned down the brightness" from their prior release, but praised the consistency of the songs and the "cool assured adult contemporary pulse of "Hot in Here.""

Michael McCall of the Associated Press gave the album a positive review, saying that they sound wiser and more grounded, balancing grown-up, light country-rockers with ballads grounded in real life and the album proves they have moved forward in the most important of ways — with their music. Grace Duffy of the Under The Gun Review gave the album seven out of ten stars, saying that the album is an open and natural addition to Rascal Flatts’ repertoire. Meena Iyer of Musicperk gave the album eight-and-a-half out of ten stars, saying "the album is a mixture of soulful music which can melt your heart and few fun upbeat tracks to make you dance."

Brian Mansfield of USA Today gave the album three out of five stars, saying "the trio has streamlined its mix of pop and country in Changed." Jon Caramanica of The New York Times gave the album a positive review, saying "on this album has largely taken to heart." Robert Silva of About.com gave the album three out of five stars, saying "the new record puts the trio in more rootsy territory than their previous effort, Nothing Like This." Sarah Gibson of ukCOUNTRYmusic.NET gave the album nine out of ten stars, saying "this album reflects the style we know and love from the group and not a "changed" style as the title suggests, and the album is reflective of their true country roots."

== Tours ==
Rascal Flatts started their Changed Tour on October 26, 2012 and their Live and Loud Tour on May 31, 2013.

=== Set list ===
The following set list is representative of the show in Camden that Took Place at Susquehanna Bank Center. It does not represent all concerts for the duration of the tour.

Camden
1. "Changed"
2. "Banjo"
3. "Summer Nights
4. "Fan Choice"
5. "Fan Choice"
6. "Fan Choice"
7. "Stand"
8. "Come Wake Me Up"
9. "Hot in Here"
10. "Bless The Broken Road"
11. "Fast Cars and Freedom"
12. "Me and My Gang"
13. "What Hurts The Most
14. "Life Is a Highway" (Tom Cochrane cover)

Encore

1. "We're an American Band" (Grand Funk Railroad cover) (with all three openers)

=== Tour dates ===
Tour dates
Date	City	Country	Venue
Leg 1 – North America 2012
June 15, 2012	Hartford	United States	Comcast Theatre
June 23, 2012	Bristow	United States	Jiffy Lube Live
June 24, 2012	Virginia Beach	United States	Farm Bureau Live
June 29, 2012	Cuyahoga Falls	United States	Blossom Music Center
June 30, 2012	Darien Lake	United States	Darien Lake Performing Arts Center
October 6, 2012	Grand Rapids	United States	Van Andel Arena
October 26, 2012	Tampa	United States	Live Nation Amphitheatre
October 27, 2012	West Palm Beach	United States	Cruzan Amphitheater
October 29, 2012	Battle Creek	United States	FireKeepers Casino Hotel
Leg 2 – North America 2013
January 10, 2013	Green Bay	United States	Resch Center
January 11, 2013	Moline	United States	iWireless Center
January 12, 2013	Springfield	United States	JQH Arena
January 17, 2013	Sioux City	United States	Tyson Events Center
January 18, 2013	Tulsa	United States	BOK Center
January 19, 2013	Wichita	United States	INTRUST Bank Arena
January 24, 2013	Spokane	United States	Spokane Veterans Memorial Arena
January 25, 2013	Missoula	United States	Adams Center
January 26, 2013	Billing	United States	Rimrock Auto Arena at MetraPark
February 2, 2013	New Orleans	United States	New Orleans Sugar Mill (CMT Crossroads with Journey)
February 7, 2013	Terre Haute	United States	ISU Hulman Center
February 8, 2013	Lexington	United States	Rupp Arena
February 9, 2013	Columbus	United States	Nationwide Arena
February 14, 2013	North Charleston	United States	North Charleston Coliseum
February 15, 2013	Greensboro	United States	Greensboro Coliseum
February 16, 2013	Charlottesville	United States	John Paul Jones Arena
February 21, 2013	Wilkes-Barre	United States	Mohegan Sun Arena at Casey Plaza
February 22, 2013	Youngstown	United States	Covelli Centre
February 23, 2013	Pickeville	United States	Eastern Kentucky Expo Center
February 28, 2013	Topeka	United States	Landon Arena
March 1, 2013	Jonesboro	United States	ASU Convocation Center
March 2, 2013	Tupelo	United States	BancorpSouth Arena
Leg 3 – Australia 2013
March 13, 2013	South Bank	Australia	Brisbane Convention & Exhibition Centre
March 15, 2013	Melbourne	Australia	Palais Theatre
March 17, 2013	Hunter Valley	Australia	Hope Estate Winery

=== Box office score data ===
Venue	City	Tickets sold / Available	Gross revenue
I wireless Center	Moline	7,867 / 10,228 (76%)	$332,159
Comcast Center	Mansfield	12,987 / 14,000 (93%)	$536,442
Comcast Theatre	Hartford	24,003 / 24,003 (100%)	$890,557
Saratoga Performing Arts Center	Saratoga Springs	12,988 / 20,000 (72%)	$539,552

== Track listing ==
Standard edition
No.	Title	Writer(s)	Length
1.	"Changed"	Gary LeVox, Wendell Mobley, Neil Thrasher	4:22
2.	"Banjo"	Tony Martin, Mobley, Thrasher	4:16
3.	"Hot in Here"	Dallas Davidson, Ashley Gorley, Kelley Lovelace	3:51
4.	"Come Wake Me Up"	Johan Fransson, Tim Larsson, Tobias Lundgren, Sean McConnell	4:23
5.	"She's Leaving"	Tom Hambridge, Jeffrey Steele	3:16
6.	"Let It Hurt"	Jay DeMarcus, Gordie Sampson, Caitlyn Smith	3:53
7.	"Lovin' Me"	Tom Shapiro, Thrasher, Jimmy Yeary	3:25
8.	"Hurry Baby"	Paul Jenkins, Jason Sellers, Shapiro	3:55
9.	"Sunrise"	Nathan Chapman, Joe Don Rooney	5:06
10.	"Great Big Love"	LeVox, Kara DioGuardi, Marti Frederiksen, Sampson	3:23
11.	"A Little Home"	Gorley, Lovelace, Thrasher	4:01
Total length:			44:08

Deluxe Edition
No.	Title	Writer(s)	Length
12.	"Friday"	Ira Dean, Jeffrey Steele	2:56
13.	"Fall Here"	Lee Thomas Miller, Neil Thrasher, Tom Shapiro	3:28
14.	"Right One Time"	Wendell Mobley, Jimmy Yeary, Tony Martin	3:24
15.	"Next to You, Next to Me"	Robert Ellis Orrall, Curtis Wright	4:08
Total length:			58:08

== Chart performance ==
=== Weekly charts ===
Chart (2012)	Peak position
Australian Country Albums (ARIA)	2
Canadian Albums (Billboard)	10
Scottish Albums (Official Charts)	70
Swedish Albums (Sverigetopplistan)	14
UK Albums (Official Charts)	87
UK Country Albums (Official Charts)	1
US Billboard 200	3
US Top Country Albums (Billboard)	1

=== Year-end charts ===
Chart (2012)	Position
US Billboard 200	68
US Top Country Albums (Billboard)	17
Chart (2013)	Position
US Top Country Albums (Billboard)	40

=== Singles ===
Year	Single	Peak chart positions						
Year	Single	US Country	US Country Airplay	US Christian	US Christian AC	US	CAN Country	CAN
2012	"Banjo"	1	—	—	—	51	—	57
2012	"Come Wake Me Up"	8	4	—	—	52	—	99
2012	"Changed"	25	20	21	23	73	43	54
2013	"Sunrise"	—	—	—	—	—	—	—
"—" denotes releases that did not chart

== Certifications ==
Region	Certification
United States (RIAA)	Gold

== Personnel ==
The following musicians are credited on the booklet.

Rascal Flatts

- Jay DeMarcus – bass guitar, backing vocals, electric guitar (10, 13), bouzouki (13), mandolin (13), lead vocals (11)
- Gary LeVox – lead vocals
- Joe Don Rooney – electric guitar, backing vocals, acoustic guitar (14), lead vocals (11)

Additional Musicians

- Charlie Judge – Hammond B3 organ (1, 2, 3, 9), synthesizers (1, 3, 4, 6, 9), keyboards (2, 5, 7, 8, 10–15), synth strings (4, 6), programming (8, 10, 12, 13, 15)
- Robbie Buchanan – Wurlitzer electric piano (2), acoustic piano (3, 4, 6, 7, 8)
- Gordon Mote – acoustic piano (6, 11, 14)
- David Huff – programming (10, 13)
- Sean Neff – programming (10)
- Tom Bukovac – electric guitar, acoustic guitar (11, 14, 15)
- Dann Huff – electric guitar (1, 2, 4–9, 11, 14), acoustic guitar (1, 4, 7, 9, 11, 14), 12-string acoustic guitar (2), bouzouki (2, 4, 14), mandolin (2, 4, 7, 9, 14), B-Bender guitar (3), ganjo (4), banjo (9), sitar (9), programming (13)
- Ilya Toshinsky – acoustic guitar (1, 2, 5, 6, 8, 10–15), banjo (2, 5), fiddle (2), dobro (5), bouzouki (6), mandolin (7, 10, 11, 12), octomandolin (7)
- Paul Franklin – steel guitar (3, 4, 6, 8, 11, 14)
- Travis Toy – banjo (7), steel guitar (10, 12, 13), dobro (15)
- Dorian Crozier – drums (1–4, 7, 8)
- Chris McHugh – drums (5, 6, 9, 11, 14)
- Shannon Forrest – drums (10, 12, 13, 15), cowbell (10)
- Eric Darken – percussion (1–9, 11, 14)
- Jonathan Yudkin – fiddle (2, 5), accordion (3), mandolin (3), viola (3, 5, 11), cello (5, 11), violin (5, 11)
- Jenee Fleener – fiddle (10, 12, 15), viola (13), violin (13)
- Jill Johnson – lead vocals (4)

=== Production ===
- Dann Huff – producer (1–9, 11, 14)
- Rascal Flatts – producers
- Darrell Franklin – A&R
- Allison Jones – A&R
- Kelly King – A&R
- Drew Bollman – recording (1–9, 11, 14), recording assistant (1–9, 11, 14), mix assistant (1–9, 11, 14)
- Mark Hagen – recording (1–9, 11, 14), digital editing (1–9, 11, 14)
- Sean Neff – recording, digital editing, mixing (10, 12, 13, 15)
- Justin Niebank – recording (1–9, 11, 14), mixing (1–9, 11, 14)
- Amir Aly – vocal recording for Jill Johnson (4)
- Taylor Nyquist – recording assistant
- Seth Morton – mix assistant (1–9, 11, 14)
- Nathan Yarborough – mix assistant (1–9, 11, 14)
- Adam Ayan – mastering
- Big Machine Creative – art direction
- Becky Reiser – design
- Randee St. Nicholas – photography
- Spalding Entertainment – management

Studios

- Recorded at Blackbird Studio and The Grip Recording Studio (Nashville, Tennessee); Pop Planet Studios (Johannesburg, South Africa).
- Mixed at Blackbird Studio and The Grip Recording Studio.
- Mastered at Gateway Mastering (Portland, Maine).

== Release history ==
Country	Date	Edition(s)	Label	Format(s)
United States	April 3, 2012	Standard, Deluxe	Big Machine Records	CD, Digital download
Canada	April 3, 2012	Standard, Deluxe	Universal Music	CD, Digital download
Australia	April 6, 2012	Standard, Deluxe	Universal Music	CD, Digital download
New Zealand	April 6, 2012	Standard, Deluxe	Universal Music	CD, Digital download
Sweden	January 2, 2013	Deluxe	Lionheart Music Group	CD, Digital download
Netherlands	January 4, 2013	Deluxe	Universal Music	CD, Digital download
Brunei Darussalam	January 7, 2013	Deluxe	Big Machine Records	Digital download
Belarus	January 7, 2013	Deluxe	Big Machine Records	Digital download
Belgium	January 7, 2013	Deluxe	Big Machine Records	Digital download
Bulgaria	January 7, 2013	Deluxe	Big Machine Records	Digital download
Cyprus	January 7, 2013	Deluxe	Big Machine Records	Digital download
Czech Republic	January 7, 2013	Deluxe	Big Machine Records	Digital download
Denmark	January 7, 2013	Deluxe	Big Machine Records	Digital download
Spain	January 7, 2013	Deluxe	Big Machine Records	Digital download
Estonia	January 7, 2013	Deluxe	Big Machine Records	Digital download
Finland	January 7, 2013	Deluxe	Big Machine Records	Digital download
France	January 7, 2013	Deluxe	Big Machine Records	Digital download
Greece	January 7, 2013	Deluxe	Big Machine Records	Digital download
Hungary	January 7, 2013	Deluxe	Big Machine Records	Digital download
Italy	January 7, 2013	Deluxe	Big Machine Records	Digital download
Latvia	January 7, 2013	Deluxe	Big Machine Records	Digital download
Lithuania	January 7, 2013	Deluxe	Big Machine Records	Digital download
Luxembourg	January 7, 2013	Deluxe	Big Machine Records	Digital download
Malta	January 7, 2013	Deluxe	Big Machine Records	Digital download
Moldova	January 7, 2013	Deluxe	Big Machine Records	Digital download
Norway	January 7, 2013	Deluxe	Big Machine Records	Digital download
Poland	January 7, 2013	Deluxe	Big Machine Records	Digital download
Portugal	January 7, 2013	Deluxe	Big Machine Records	Digital download
Romania	January 7, 2013	Deluxe	Big Machine Records	Digital download
Switzerland	January 7, 2013	Deluxe	Big Machine Records	Digital download
Slovakia	January 7, 2013	Deluxe	Big Machine Records	Digital download
Turkey	January 7, 2013	Deluxe	Big Machine Records	Digital download
Ukraine	January 7, 2013	Deluxe	Big Machine Records	Digital download
Russia	January 7, 2013	Deluxe	Big Machine Records	Digital download
Armenia	January 7, 2013	Deluxe	Big Machine Records	Digital download
Azerbaijan	January 7, 2013	Deluxe	Big Machine Records	Digital download
Botswana	January 7, 2013	Deluxe	Big Machine Records	Digital download
Burkina Faso	January 7, 2013	Deluxe	Big Machine Records	Digital download
Cape Verde	January 7, 2013	Deluxe	Big Machine Records	Digital download
Gambia	January 7, 2013	Deluxe	Big Machine Records	Digital download
Ghana	January 7, 2013	Deluxe	Big Machine Records	Digital download
Guinea-Bissau	January 7, 2013	Deluxe	Big Machine Records	Digital download
India	January 7, 2013	Deluxe	Big Machine Records	Digital download
Israel	January 7, 2013	Deluxe	Big Machine Records	Digital download
Kenya	January 7, 2013	Deluxe	Big Machine Records	Digital download
Mauritius	January 7, 2013	Deluxe	Big Machine Records	Digital download
Mozambique	January 7, 2013	Deluxe	Big Machine Records	Digital download
Namibia	January 7, 2013	Deluxe	Big Machine Records	Digital download
Niger	January 7, 2013	Deluxe	Big Machine Records	Digital download
Nigeria	January 7, 2013	Deluxe	Big Machine Records	Digital download
South Africa	January 7, 2013	Deluxe	Big Machine Records	Digital download
Swaziland	January 7, 2013	Deluxe	Big Machine Records	Digital download
Uganda	January 7, 2013	Deluxe	Big Machine Records	Digital download
Zimbabwe	January 7, 2013	Deluxe	Big Machine Records	Digital download
Cambodia	January 7, 2013	Deluxe	Big Machine Records	Digital download
Fiji	January 7, 2013	Deluxe	Big Machine Records	Digital download
Indonesia	January 7, 2013	Deluxe	Big Machine Records	Digital download
Kazakhstan	January 7, 2013	Deluxe	Big Machine Records	Digital download
Kyrgyzstana	January 7, 2013	Deluxe	Big Machine Records	Digital download
Lao, People's Democratic Republic	January 7, 2013	Deluxe	Big Machine Records	Digital download
Malaysia	January 7, 2013	Deluxe	Big Machine Records	Digital download
Federated States of Micronesia	January 7, 2013	Deluxe	Big Machine Records	Digital download
Mongolia	January 7, 2013	Deluxe	Big Machine Records	Digital download
Nepal	January 7, 2013	Deluxe	Big Machine Records	Digital download
Papua New Guinea	January 7, 2013	Deluxe	Big Machine Records	Digital download
Philippines	January 7, 2013	Deluxe	Big Machine Records	Digital download
Sri Lanka	January 7, 2013	Deluxe	Big Machine Records	Digital download
Tajikistan	January 7, 2013	Deluxe	Big Machine Records	Digital download
Thailand	January 7, 2013	Deluxe	Big Machine Records	Digital download
Turkmenistan	January 7, 2013	Deluxe	Big Machine Records	Digital download
Uzbekistan	January 7, 2013	Deluxe	Big Machine Records	Digital download
Vietnam	January 7, 2013	Deluxe	Big Machine Records	Digital download
Singapore	January 7, 2013	Deluxe	Big Machine Records	Digital download
Macao	January 7, 2013	Deluxe	Big Machine Records	Digital download
Hong Kong	January 7, 2013	Deluxe	Big Machine Records	Digital download
Anguilla	January 7, 2013	Deluxe	Big Machine Records	Digital download
Antigua and Barbuda	January 7, 2013	Deluxe	Big Machine Records	Digital download
Argentina	January 7, 2013	Deluxe	Big Machine Records	Digital download
Bahamas	January 7, 2013	Deluxe	Big Machine Records	Digital download
Barbados	January 7, 2013	Deluxe	Big Machine Records	Digital download
Bermuda	January 7, 2013	Deluxe	Big Machine Records	Digital download
Bolivia	January 7, 2013	Deluxe	Big Machine Records	Digital download
Brasil	January 7, 2013	Deluxe	Big Machine Records	Digital download
British Virgin Islands	January 7, 2013	Deluxe	Big Machine Records	Digital download
Cayman Islands	January 7, 2013	Deluxe	Big Machine Records	Digital download
Chile	January 7, 2013	Deluxe	Big Machine Records	Digital download
Colombia	January 7, 2013	Deluxe	Big Machine Records	Digital download
Costa Rica	January 7, 2013	Deluxe	Big Machine Records	Digital download
Dominica	January 7, 2013	Deluxe	Big Machine Records	Digital download
Dominican Republic	January 7, 2013	Deluxe	Big Machine Records	Digital download
Ecuador	January 7, 2013	Deluxe	Big Machine Records	Digital download
El Salvador	January 7, 2013	Deluxe	Big Machine Records	Digital download
Grenada	January 7, 2013	Deluxe	Big Machine Records	Digital download
Guatemala	January 7, 2013	Deluxe	Big Machine Records	Digital download
Honduras	January 7, 2013	Deluxe	Big Machine Records	Digital download
Nicaragua	January 7, 2013	Deluxe	Big Machine Records	Digital download
Panama	January 7, 2013	Deluxe	Big Machine Records	Digital download
Paraguay	January 7, 2013	Deluxe	Big Machine Records	Digital download
Peru	January 7, 2013	Deluxe	Big Machine Records	Digital download
Saint Kitts and Nevis	January 7, 2013	Deluxe	Big Machine Records	Digital download
Trinidad and Tobago	January 7, 2013	Deluxe	Big Machine Records	Digital download
Venezuela	January 7, 2013	Deluxe	Big Machine Records	Digital download
Germany	January 22, 2013	Deluxe	Universal Music	CD, Digital download
Austria	January 22, 2013	Deluxe	Universal Music	CD, Digital download
Slovenia	January 22, 2013	Deluxe	Universal Music	CD, Digital download
Taiwan	February 1, 2013	Deluxe	Universal Music	CD, Digital download
Japan	February 13, 2013	Deluxe	Universal Music	CD, Digital download
Ireland	July 5, 2013	Deluxe	Universal Music	CD, Digital download
United Kingdom	July 8, 2013	Deluxe	Decca Records	CD, Digital download
