= Songs for Daddy =

Studio album by Jill Johnson
- Released: 22 October 2014
- Genre: country, jazz
- Label: Lionheart

Jill Johnson chronology
Livemusiken från Jills veranda (2014)	Songs for Daddy (2014)

Songs for Daddy is a 2014 Jill Johnson studio album. The album is a tribute to her father's music taste.

== Track listing ==
1. Crazy in Love
2. Hallelujah I Love Him So
3. Fly Me to the Moon
4. Moon River
5. Something's Gotta Give
6. That's Life
7. Love is Here to Stay
8. The Very thought of You
9. No other Daddy but You
10. After You've Gone
11. Everybody Loves Somebody
12. I Can't Give You Anything but Love

== Charts ==
=== Weekly charts ===
Chart (2014)	Peak position
Swedish Albums (Sverigetopplistan)	1

=== Year-end charts ===
Chart (2014)	Position
Swedish Albums (Sverigetopplistan)	18
