= Come Wake Me Up =

Single by Rascal Flatts

from the album Changed
- Released: May 21, 2012
- Genre: Country
- Length: 4:23 (Album Version); 4:05 (Single Version)
- Label: Big Machine
- Songwriters: Johan Fransson; Tim Larsson; Tobias Lundgren; Sean McConnell
- Producers: Dann Huff; Rascal Flatts

Rascal Flatts singles chronology
"Banjo" (2012)	"Come Wake Me Up" (2012)	"Changed" (2012)

"Come Wake Me Up" is a song recorded by American country music group Rascal Flatts. It was released in May 2012 as the second single from their eighth studio album, Changed. The song was written by Johan Fransson, Tim Larsson, Tobias Lundgren and Sean McConnell. On November 7, a duet version with Swedish country/pop female singer, Jill Johnson was released on Johnson's album, A Woman Can Change Her Mind. The duet version was also released as a digital download internationally on November 16, 2012.

"Come Wake Me Up" debuted at number 59 on the U.S. Billboard Hot Country Songs chart for the week of June 2, 2012. It also debuted at number 98 on the U.S. Billboard Hot 100 chart for the week of August 11, 2012. It also debuted at number 99 on the Canadian Hot 100 chart for the week of October 6, 2012.

== Content ==
"Come Wake Me Up" is about a man who has broken up with his lover. Affected by the emotions, he wishes that he were dreaming and asks that she awaken him.

The song has a 6/8 time signature with an approximate tempo of 52 dotted quarter notes per minute. It is set in the key of E major with a main chord pattern of E^{M7}–C♯m^{7}–E^{M7}–C♯m^{7}–A–B–G♯m–C♯m^{7}–B on the verses.

== Reception ==
Professional ratings
Review scores
Source	Rating
Taste of Country	4.5/5 stars
Roughstock	(favorable)
Country Universe	(B+)

Billy Dukes of Taste of Country gave the song four and a half stars out of five, calling it "another fine example of how this trio continues to work at a level few country artists are aware of." It also received a favorable review from Matt Bjorke of Roughstock, who wrote that it "fits well with their classic ballads while also having a slightly different sonic landscape to the past songs along with a return to more of their classic harmonies on the choruses." Kevin John Coyne of Country Universe gave the song a B+, calling it "an incredible lyric and a nuanced vocal performance" and "the best composition that Rascal Flatts has tackled since 'I'm Movin' On'", although he criticized its production.

== Music video ==
The music video was directed by Shaun Silva and premiered on August 10, 2012. Guitarist Joe Don Rooney acts as the video’s male protagonist, his first leading role in a video. A cameo from Rooney’s real-life wife, Tiffany Fallon, as his love interest gives the video a realistic angle. Two-time female street freestyle world champion Dena Sodano acted as Fallon’s stunt double during the motorcycle scenes. “So I had this story unfolding, this moment of — here’s a girl who really is just from a different world than what he’s from,” says video director Shaun Silva. “Joe Don’s character is doing all the things anybody would want to do for someone they love, but it threatens her identity, until one night after an argument, she removes a necklace like breaking free from his lavish grasp. Her decision to leave, and his to chase after her, only pushes her further towards her foreshadowed fate.” The video was nominated for Group Video of the Year at the 2013 CMT Music Awards.

== Charts ==
=== Weekly charts ===
Chart (2012)	Peak position
Canada Hot 100 (Billboard)	99
US Billboard Hot 100	52
US Country Airplay (Billboard)	4
US Hot Country Songs (Billboard)	8

=== Year-end charts ===
Chart (2012)	Position
US Country Songs (Billboard)	43

== Certifications ==
Region	Certification	Certified units/sales
United States (RIAA)	Platinum	1,000,000^{*}
^{*} Sales figures based on certification alone.
