= Music Row II =

Studio album by Jill Johnson
- Released: 28 October 2009
- Genre: Country, pop
- Length: 48:04
- Label: Lionheart Records

Jill Johnson chronology
Baby Blue Paper (2008)	Music Row II (2009)	The Well-Known And Some Other Favourite Stories (2010)

Music Row II is the second cover album by Jill Johnson, recorded in Nashville and released on 28 October 2009, two years after Music Row.

== Track listing ==
No.	Title	Writer(s)	Length
1.	"Love Is a Rose" (Linda Ronstadt cover)	Neil Young	2:41
2.	"Thing Called Love" (Bonnie Raitt cover, duet with Björn Skifs)	John Hiatt	3:50
3.	"It's a Heartache" (Bonnie Tyler cover)	Ronnie Scott, Steve Wolfe	3:57
4.	"What Good I Am" (Bob Dylan cover)	Bob Dylan	4:45
5.	"Lost Without Your Love" (Bread cover)	David Gates	4:04
6.	"No Surrender" (Bruce Springsteen cover)	Bruce Springsteen	4:03
7.	"Here You Come Again" (Dolly Parton cover)	Barry Mann, Cynthia Weil	3:05
8.	"Too Far Gone" (Emmylou Harris cover, duett with Titiyo)	Billy Sherrill	3:59
9.	"Love Me Like a Man" (Bonnie Raitt cover)	Chris Smither, Bonnie Raitt	4:49
10.	"Two Doors Down" (Dolly Parton cover)	Dolly Parton	3:32
11.	"Together Again" (Buck Owens cover)	Buck Owens	4:06
12.	"I Can't Make You Love Me" (Bonnie Raitt cover)	Mike Reid, Allen Shamblin	5:13

== Charts ==
Chart (2009–2010)	Peak position
Swedish Albums (Sverigetopplistan)	2
