= Changed (Rascal Flatts song) =

2012 single by Rascal Flatts

Single by Rascal Flatts

from the album Changed
- Released: December 17, 2012
- Genre: Christian country
- Length: 4:22 (Album Version); 3:40 (Radio Edit)
- Label: Big Machine
- Songwriters: Gary LeVox; Wendell Mobley; Neil Thrasher
- Producers: Dann Huff; Rascal Flatts

Rascal Flatts singles chronology
"Come Wake Me Up" (2012)	"Changed" (2012)	"Sunrise" (2013)

"Changed" is a song recorded by American country music group Rascal Flatts. It was released in December 2012 as the third single from their eighth studio album of the same name. The song was written by Gary LeVox, Wendell Mobley and Neil Thrasher. It was released to country radio on December 17, 2012, and AC and Christian AC radio on January 22, 2013.

== History ==
The song came about from a true story told by the co-writer Neil Thrasher after his daughter was baptized on the beach. Thrasher shared the story of his daughter's baptism with Rascal Flatts lead vocalist Gary LeVox, and presented him with some lyrics that he had written about it. He sang the lines to LeVox, who finished the song with him and Wendell Mobley at LeVox's farm.

== Critical reception ==
Professional ratings
Review scores
Source	Rating
Taste of Country	4.5/5 stars
Roughstock	(favorable)
Country Universe	(B)

Billy Dukes of Taste of Country gave the song four and a half stars out of five, writing that "sonically, the soaring ballad has all of the hallmarks of a choice Rascal Flatts song." Matt Bjorke of Roughstock gave the song a favorable review, calling it "a lyrically strong song about giving up the past transgressions for a better path." Tara Seetharam of Country Universe gave the song a B, calling it "an earnest and relatively restrained performance and has legs."

== Music videos ==
A live music video, directed by Shaun Silva, premiered in November 2012. It was cut from their DVD, All Access & Uncovered: The Making of Changed and Beyond. The official music video, directed by Carl Diebold, premiered in April 2013. The official video stars Charles Esten.

== Chart performance ==
"Changed" debuted at number 52 on the U.S. Billboard Country Airplay chart for the week of January 5, 2013. It also debuted at number 48 on the U.S. Billboard Hot Country Songs chart for the week of January 26, 2013. As of the chart dated February 2, 2013, the song debuted at number 26 on the U.S. Billboard Christian Songs chart. This makes Rascal Flatts' first appearance on that chart. It also debuted at number 73 on the U.S. Billboard Hot 100 chart and number 54 on the Canadian Hot 100 chart for the week of March 31, 2012. As of the chart dated March 2, 2013, the song debuted at number 29 on the U.S. Billboard Hot Christian Adult Contemporary chart. This is Rascal Flatts' first appearance on that chart. It peaked at number 20 on Country Airplay and number 25 on Hot Country Songs.

Chart (2012–2013)	Peak position
Canada Hot 100 (Billboard)	54
Canada Country (Billboard)	43
US Billboard Hot 100	73
US Christian Songs (Billboard)	21
US Hot Christian Adult Contemporary (Billboard)	19
US Country Airplay (Billboard)	20
US Hot Country Songs (Billboard)	25

=== Year-end charts ===
Chart (2013)	Position
US Country Airplay (Billboard)	89
US Hot Country Songs (Billboard)	75

== Certifications ==
Region	Certification	Certified units/sales
United States (RIAA)	Gold	500,000^{‡}
^{‡} Sales+streaming figures based on certification alone.

== Release history ==
List of radio and release dates with formats and record labels
Country	Date	Format	Label
United States	December 17, 2012	Country radio	Big Machine Records
United States	January 22, 2013	Christian AC radio	Big Machine Records
United States	January 22, 2013	AC radio	Big Machine Records
