= Being Who You Are =

Studio album by Jill Johnson
- Released: 23 March 2005
- Length: 44:05
- Label: Lionheart

Jill Johnson chronology
Roots and Wings (2003)	Being Who You Are (2005)	The Christmas in You (2005)

Being Who You Are was released on 23 March 2005 and is an album from Swedish pop and country singer Jill Johnson. It peaked at number four on the Swedish Albums Chart.

== Track listing ==
1. God Bless a Girl in Love – 3:07
2. So Much Love to Make – 3:36
3. A Little Bit More – 4:14
4. Baby You're Mine – 3:02
5. Ringing Bells – 2:50
6. When Being Who You Are – 2:56
7. The Heartache Wont Be Mine – 3:04
8. I Don't Wanna be that Girl – 3:16
9. You Can Have It All – 3:29
10. Some People Are Just Not Cool – 4:01
11. (Im Not) in Love with You – 2:59
12. Without Your Love – 3:58
13. Redneck Woman – 3:33

== Charts ==
Chart (2005)	Peak position
Swedish Albums (Sverigetopplistan)	4
