= Sugartree =

Studio album by Jill Johnson
- Released: 28 March 1996
- Recorded: 1996
- Genre: Country
- Length: 40:00
- Label: EMI
- Producer: Jan Lysdahl, Mikael Henderson, Poul Bruun

Jill Johnson chronology
Sugartree (1996)	När hela världen ser på (1998)

Sugartree is the debut studio album by Swedish pop and country singer Jill Johnson. It was released on 28 March 1996 and includes the singles "Shake the Sugartree" and "All Kinds of People".

== Track listing ==
1. Shake the Sugar Tree (Chapin Hartford) 3:17
2. As Dreams Go By (Andy Hill, Pete Sinfield) 5:25
3. The Street Where You Live 3:38
4. It's My House 3:23
5. Can't Get You Out of My Head 4:01
6. Killing Time 3:31
7. All Kinds of People 3:31
8. In My Own Way 3:43
9. Unbreakable Heart 4:43
10. Less of the Same 4:25
11. Jag Skulle så Gerna Vilja Gifte Meg 0:15
12. There'll Be Pork in the Treetops Come Morning

== Contributors ==
- Jill Johnson, vocals
- Jan Lysdahl, drums, keyboard, guitar, bass
- Mikael Henderson - keyboard
