= No Surrender (Bruce Springsteen song) =

Promotional single by Bruce Springsteen

from the album Born in the U.S.A.
- Released: June 4, 1984
- Recorded: October 25–27, 1983
- Studio: Hit Factory, New York City
- Genre: Rock; rock and roll
- Length: 4:02
- Label: Columbia
- Songwriter: Bruce Springsteen
- Producers: Jon Landau; Bruce Springsteen; Steven Van Zandt

Bruce Springsteen singles chronology
"Dancing in the Dark" (1984)	"No Surrender" (1984)	"Born in the U.S.A." (1984)

"No Surrender" is a song from Bruce Springsteen's album Born in the U.S.A. It was only included on the album at the insistence of Steven Van Zandt, but has since become a concert staple for Springsteen. Though it was not one of the seven top ten hits of the album, "No Surrender" nevertheless charted on the Mainstream Rock chart, peaking at No. 29. It returned to prominence during the 2004 United States presidential election when John Kerry, the Democratic candidate and a fan of Springsteen, used the song as the main theme song for his campaign.

== Live performances ==
During the Born in the U.S.A. Tour, Springsteen played a slower version of the song on acoustic guitar and harmonica. The song was played less and less towards the end of the tour. Springsteen wrote years later: "It was a song I was uncomfortable with. You don't hold out and triumph all the time in life. You compromise, you suffer defeat; you slip into life's gray areas." An August 6, 1984 recording at the Meadowlands Arena is included on the box set Live 1975–85.

The song was performed at 41% of shows on The River tour; 44% of shows on the High Hopes tour; 29% of the shows on the Wrecking Ball tour; 48% of shows on the Working On A Dream tour; 47% of shows on the Magic tour; 58% of shows on The Rising tour; 7% of shows on the Reunion Tour; 47% of shows on the solo acoustic The Ghost Of Tom Joad tour; and 33% of shows on the Born In The U.S.A. tour. It did not feature at any shows on the Devils & Dust tour; the 1992-93 World Tour, the Human Rights Now! tour, or the Tunnel of Love Express tour.

As of 14 April 2024, the song has been performed at 71 of 74 shows (96%) on the 2023-2024 International Tour. It was played at each of the tour's initial 70 shows, being omitted for the first time at the 31 March 2024 show at Chase Center in San Francisco.

== Personnel ==
According to authors Philippe Margotin and Jean-Michel Guesdon:

- Bruce Springsteen – vocals, guitars
- Roy Bittan – piano
- Danny Federici – organ
- Garry Tallent – bass
- Max Weinberg – drums
- Richie Rosenberg – backing vocals, vocal harmonies

== Cover versions ==
In 2008, Hot Water Music recorded the song on their B-sides and rarities album Til The Wheels Fall Off.

In 2009, Jill Johnson from Sweden recorded the song on the cover album Music Row II.

In 2009, Two Cow Garage recorded the song for the A side of Vol. 9 of Suburban Home Records' "Under the Influence" 7" covers series. Side B of the 7" features Jr. Juggernaut covering "Trouble" by Cat Stevens.

In 2010, Maeve O'Boyle recorded the song for her album Intermission which was released in 2011.

In 2013, Mark Salling recorded a cover of the song for the TV show Glee as a tribute to cast member Cory Monteith who died suddenly earlier in the year. His version of the song was featured in the season 5 episode "The Quarterback", a tribute to Monteith, and his character Finn Hudson, who had recently died.

In 2017, Australian country music singer James Blundell recorded the song as a duet with Paul Costa on his Campfire album

In 2017, at the No Surrender Festival in Vilanova de Bellpuig, Catalonia, 1004 musicians and singers recorded a live version of the song.

Hawthorne Heights recorded a cover of the song on their 2019 album 'Lost Frequencies'

In 2020 The City Kids recorded a cover of this song on their album ‘Sh*t That We Like’ that accompanied their debut album ‘Things That Never Were’.
