= Banjo (song) =

Single by Rascal Flatts

from the album Changed
- Released: January 16, 2012
- Genre: Country
- Length: 4:16 (Album Version); 3:44 (Radio Edit); 3:29 (Radio Edit 2)
- Label: Big Machine
- Songwriters: Tony Martin; Wendell Mobley; Neil Thrasher
- Producer: Dann Huff Rascal Flatts

Rascal Flatts singles chronology
"Easy" (2011)	"Banjo" (2012)	"Come Wake Me Up" (2012)

"Banjo" is a song written by Neil Thrasher, Wendell Mobley, and Tony Martin and recorded by American country music group Rascal Flatts. It was released in January 2012 as the first single from their eighth studio album, Changed. Rascal Flatts also performed the song live with Steve Martin at the Academy of Country Music Awards in 2012.

== Content ==
"Banjo" is an up-tempo song in which the narrator invites his lover to escape with him to a faraway place that "ain't on the map". He tells her to "go-go-go / 'Til [she] hear[s] a banjo."

Neil Thrasher and Wendell Mobley, both of whom have written several singles for Rascal Flatts, told Taste of Country that the line "'til you hear a banjo" came when Rascal Flatts' lead singer Gary LeVox was giving the two directions to his farm. Although they did not write the song at the farm, Mobley and Thrasher presented the idea to Tony Martin. The next time Mobley went to LeVox's farm, he presented LeVox with a demonstration recording of the song, and LeVox said that he would cut the song "right now".

== Critical reception ==
The song has received mixed reviews from critics. Rating it three-and-a-half stars out of five, Matt Bjorke thought that the band sounded "refreshed" and that the song itself was "well-produced". The song received an identical rating from Billy Dukes of Taste of Country, who criticized the song's lyrics, but said that it "should be enjoyed for what's on the surface". Noah Eaton of Country Universe gave the song a "C+" grade, saying that LeVox "actually sounds like he's enjoying the ride here", but criticizing the production for its "stereotypical stadium-rock histrionics" in the last verse. Ben Foster of The 1-to-10 Country Music Review gave it five stars out of 10, saying, "the song will more than likely supply the group with another chart hit, and a high-volume set opener for their live shows."

== Chart performance ==
"Banjo" debuted at number 37 on the U.S. Billboard Hot Country Songs charts for the week of January 28, 2012, and became the group's 12th number-one hit, for the week of May 12, 2012.

Chart (2012)	Peak position
Canada Hot 100 (Billboard)	57
US Billboard Hot 100	51
US Hot Country Songs (Billboard)	1

=== Year-end charts ===
Chart (2012)	Position
US Country Songs (Billboard)	33

== Certifications ==
Region	Certification	Certified units/sales
United States (RIAA)	Gold	500,000^{‡}
^{‡} Sales+streaming figures based on certification alone.

== Parody ==
- American parody artist Cledus T. Judd released a parody of "Banjo" titled "Tebow" on his 2012 album Parodyziac!!.
