= Flirting with Disaster (Jill Johnson album) =

Studio album by Jill Johnson
- Released: 28 September 2011
- Genre: Country, country pop
- Length: 46,55 minutes
- Label: Lionheart International
- Producer: Amir Aly

Jill Johnson chronology
| The Well-Known And Some Other Favourite Stories (2010) | Flirting with Disaster (2011) | Välkommen jul (2011) |

Flirting with Disaster is a 2011 studio album by Jill Johnson produced by Amir Aly, allowing Johnson to score her first number-one album in Sweden.

== Track listing ==
| | Title | Songwriter | Length |
|---|---|---|---|
| 1 | Flirting With Disaster | Jill Johnson, Liz Rose, Lisa Carver | 3:19 |
| 2 | What's a Little Rain | Jill Johnson, Liz Rose, Lisa Carver, Pam Rose | 4:01 |
| 3 | In One Piece | Jill Johnson, Liz Rose, Lisa Carver | 3:39 |
| 4 | While You're Sleeping | Jill Johnson, Liz Rose, Lisa Carver | 3:45 |
| 5 | I'm Awake Now | Jill Johnson, Liz Rose, Pam Rose | 3:32 |
| 6 | Don't Wanna Let You Go | Jill Johnson, Liz Rose, Lisa Carver | 3:01 |
| 7 | I'm Never Far | Jill Johnson, Liz Rose, Pam Rose | 3:23 |
| 8 | When We Had It So Good | Jill Johnson, Liz Rose, Pam Rose | 3:15 |
| 9 | Roll My Way | Jill Johnson, Liz Rose, Lisa Carver, Pam Rose | 4:01 |
| 10 | The Sound of Leaving | Jill Johnson, Liz Rose, Lisa Carver | 3:38 |
| 11 | Used to Think He Was Everything | Jill Johnson, Liz Rose, Lori McKenna | 3:38 |
| 12 | Dreaming Me Away | Jill Johnson, Liz Rose, Lisa Carver | 3:29 |
| 13 | Song to Heaven (bonus track) | Aleena Gibson, Molly Sandén | 4:12 |

== Charts ==
| Chart (2011–2012) | Peak position |
|---|---|
| Sweden (Sverigetopplistan) | 1 |
