= A Woman Can Change Her Mind =

Studio album by Jill Johnson
- Released: 7 November 2012
- Recorded: YLA Studios
- Genre: country
- Label: Lionheart International
- Producer: Amir Aly

Jill Johnson chronology
Välkommen jul (2011)	A Woman Can Change Her Mind (2012)	Duetterna (2013)

A Woman Can Change Her Mind is a 2012 Jill Johnson studio album.

== Track listing ==
1. A Woman Can Change Her Mind
2. The Chill
3. Fast Trip Up
4. Jacked Up Heart
5. Are You Feeling It Now
6. Over a Man
7. Scene of the Crime
8. The Whiskey’s Working
9. Hurting Out Loud
10. That Boy Is a Long Story
11. Nobody’s Getting Out of This Love
12. Looking for Home
13. White Lightning
14. Come Wake Me Up (with Rascal Flatts)

== Charts ==
=== Weekly charts ===
Chart (2012–2013)	Peak position
Swedish Albums (Sverigetopplistan)	3

=== Year-end charts ===
Chart (2012)	Position
Swedish Albums (Sverigetopplistan)	40
