= Daughter of Eve =

Studio album by Jill Johnson
- Released: 30 November 2000
- Length: 42:15
- Label: Lionheart Records

Jill Johnson chronology
När hela världen ser på (1998)	Daughter of Eve (2000)	Good Girl (2002)

Daughter of Eve was released on 30 November 2000 and is a studio album from Swedish pop and country singer Jill Johnson. It peaked at number 59 on the Swedish Albums Chart.

== Track listing ==
1. Mother's Jewel - 3:38
2. Secrets in My Life - 3:29
3. My Love for You - 4:40
4. Live for Today - 4:16
5. It's Only You - 3:34
6. Everybody's Confidante - 4:07
7. When I Look at You - 4:06
8. No One Else But You - 3:17
9. Only in Your Dreams - 4:19
10. Lonely, Lonely - 4:11
11. It's Too Late - 5:38

== Charts ==
Chart (2000)	Peak position
Swedish Albums (Sverigetopplistan)	59
