= När hela världen ser på =

Studio album by Jill Johnson
- Released: 10 May 1998
- Length: 43:11
- Label: Lionheart Records

Jill Johnson chronology
Sugartree (1996)	När hela världen ser på (1998)	Daughter of Eve (2000)

När hela världen ser på was released on 10 May 1998 and is an album from Swedish pop and country singer Jill Johnson. The album peaked at number 37 on the Swedish Albums Chart.

== Track listing ==
1. När hela världen ser på - 4:30
2. Kärleken är - 3:00
3. Jag har havet ett stenkast ifrån mig - 3:46
4. Det här är mitt hem - 2:53
5. Vart jag än går - 3:42
6. Vi brinner - 3:10
7. Hennes ögon - 3:04
8. Låt mig få vila i dig - 4:02
9. För att - 3:36
10. Halvvägs till himlen - 3:30
11. Som en båt på öppet hav - 4:58
12. Eternal Love (Kärleken är) - 3:00

== Charts ==
Chart (1998)	Peak position
Swedish Albums (Sverigetopplistan)	37
