= Roots and Wings (Jill Johnson album) =

Studio album by Jill Johnson
- Released: 26 November 2003
- Genre: Country pop
- Length: 49:24
- Label: Lionheart Records

Jill Johnson chronology
Discography (2003)	Roots and Wings (2003)	Being Who You Are (2005)

Roots and Wings, released on 26 November 2003, is a studio album from Swedish pop and country singer Jill Johnson. It peaked at number five on the Swedish Albums Chart.

== Track listing ==
1. Can't Get Enough of You - 3:16
2. God's Gift - 3:13
3. Breakfast in New York - 4:05
4. Natalie - 3:35
5. A Woman Knows - 3:44
6. You Can't Love Me Too Much - 3:24
7. Good for You - 2:54
8. You're Still Here - 3:15
9. Hopelessly Devoted - 4:05
10. Roots and Wings - 3:27
11. It Ain't the End of the World - 2:43
12. When I Found You - 4:17
13. Time Will Fly - 3:49
14. Desperado - 3:37

== Charts ==
=== Weekly charts ===
Chart (2003–2004)	Peak position
Swedish Albums (Sverigetopplistan)	5

=== Year-end charts ===
Chart (2003)	Position
Swedish Albums (Sverigetopplistan)	76
Chart (2004)	Position
Swedish Albums (Sverigetopplistan)	26
