= Välkommen jul =

Studio album by Jill Johnson
- Released: November 2011
- Recorded: Gävle Concert Hall, Gävle, Sweden, August 2011
- Genre: Christmas, country
- Length: 46:17
- Label: Lionheart Music Group
- Producer: Peter Nordahl

Jill Johnson chronology
Flirting With Disaster (2011)	Välkommen jul (2011)	A Woman Can Change Her Mind (2012)

Välkommen jul is a 2011 Country Christmas album, recorded with the Gävle Symphony Orchestra. The album was sold in the ICA stores of Sweden to bring money for the World Childhood Foundation.

== Track listing ==
	Title	Writer	Length
1	Amazing Grace	trad.	3:55
2	I'll Be Home for Christmas	Kim Gannon, Buck Ram, Walter Kent	3:52
3	I väntan på julen ("Greensleeves") (duet with Tommy Körberg)	trad.	3:39
4	Det är en ros utsprungen (Es ist ein Ros entsprungen)	trad. lyrics by Tekla Knös	3:20
5	A Cradle in Bethlehem	Larry Stock, Alf Bryan	3:09
6	Christmas Without You	Jörgen Elofsson, Liz Rodrigues	3:38
7	En julsaga ("Fairytale of New York") (duet with Stefan Sundström)	Shane MacGowan, Jem Finer (Swedish: Marie Nilsson, Per Persson)	4:54
8	The First Noel	trad.	4:26
9	Angel	Sarah McLachlan	3:40
10	Away in a Manger	William J. Kirkpatrick, lyrics: trad	2:14
11	Stilla natt ("Stille Nacht, heilige Nacht")	Franz Gruber, Torsten Fogelqvist, Oscar Mannström	4:26
12	Silver Bells	Jay Livingston, Ray Evans	5:02
