= Good Girl (Jill Johnson album) =

Studio album by Jill Johnson
- Released: 15 November 2002
- Genre: Country pop
- Length: 42:38
- Label: Lionheart Records

Jill Johnson chronology
Daughter of Eve (2000)	Good Girl (2002)	Discography (2003)

Good Girl is a 2002 studio album by Swedish pop and country singer Jill Johnson. It peaked at number 37 on the Swedish Albums Chart. The album was recorded in Nashville, Tennessee in the United States.

== Track listing ==
1. Jump in a Car - 3:43
2. What's Wrong with You - 3:41
3. Faking Loving Me - 3:19
4. Luckiest People - 4:16
5. Good Girl - 3:04
6. Too Much of You (Ain't Enough for Me) - 3:01
7. Just Like You Do - 3:40
8. Astroturf - 3:46
9. Moonlight and Roses - 3:21
10. Simply Because of Me - 3:48
11. I Didn't Know My Heart Could Break - 3:22
12. Final Call - 3:37

== Charts ==
Chart (2002)	Peak position
Swedish Albums (Sverigetopplistan)	37
