= Myrra Malmberg =

Swedish singer

- Born: Anna Myrra Malmberg; 20 December 1966 (age 58); Farsta, Sweden
- Occupation(s): Singer, dancer, songwriter, photographer
- Website: myrramalmberg.com

Anna Myrra Malmberg (born 20 December 1966) is a Swedish singer, dancer, songwriter, and photographer.

== Early life ==
Anna Myrra Malmberg was born in the Stockholm suburb of Farsta, and spent her childhood in Minneapolis, Minnesota and her teenage years in Stockholm, Sweden. She graduated the Stockholm High School of Music and immediately embarked upon a theatrical career. Early on she took on roles such as Maria in West Side Story, Hodel in Fiddler on the Roof and Grizabella in Cats, but also straight acting roles such as Poppy in Noises Off.

== Career ==
In London's West End, where she was cast as Christine in The Phantom of the Opera by director Hal Prince, Malmberg also played Cosette in Les Misérables, Estella in Great Expectations and The Narrator in Joseph and the Amazing Technicolor Dreamcoat. She caught the attention of Andrew Lloyd Webber and joined the cast of The Music of Andrew Lloyd Webber at St Paul's Cathedral and elsewhere. Malmberg also appeared in the Royal Variety Show, broadcast by the BBC from the London Palladium, BBC's Blue Peter, GMTV and the BBC series Showstoppers, opposite Gary Wilmot.

Other roles include Eva Perón in Evita at the Gothenburg Opera, Emma Carew in Jekyll and Hyde at Stockholm's China Theatre and Maria in West Side Story at the Rome Opera in Italy and the Gothenburg Opera, Sweden.

Malmberg's Swedish TV credits span drama, including Fallet Paragon, to popular entertainment shows, such as Allsång på Skansen, Go'kväll, Söndagsöppet and Så ska det låta. She also appeared on Celebrity Jeopardy (which she won) and participated in Melodifestivalen (Eurovision Song Contest). She has also performed as a special guest star in Russia's own Eurovision in the early 1990s to 80 million viewers.

Her discography includes the Stephen Sondheim retrospective What Can You Lose, the string quartet Lloyd Webber retrospective Unexpected, a handful of bossa nova albums especially successful throughout Asia, the singer/songwriter album Serendipity, plus various cast albums and soundtracks. She has been awarded a Grammy.

Malmberg's latest recording is the classical crossover, Another World. Together with the Norrköping Symphony Orchestra and internationally renowned conductor Paul Bateman she explores the musical territory between the classical and popular music genres.

Malmberg has lent her voice to a long list of Disney characters in their Swedish incarnations, including Princess Jasmine in Aladdin, Ariel in The Little Mermaid, Wendy in Peter Pan, Megara in Hercules and Norma Jean in Happy Feet.

She has written songs and lyrics for other recording artists and has translated lyrics and scripts into Swedish from English, French and Danish, including Jekyll and Hyde – the Musical for Malmö Opera.

Her photography includes portraits and album covers for various recording artists such as Benny Andersson, Berndt Rosengren, and The Sweet Jazz Trio. Malmberg has also held solo exhibits of her work.

On 14 March 1998 Myrra Malmberg competed at Melodifestivalen in Malmö with the song Julia, ending up third.

== Selected stage performances ==
Year	Production	Role	Theatre
1987	Cats	Grizabella	China Theatre, Stockholm
1990	Fiddler on the Roof	Hodel	Stockholms Stadsteater & Riksteatern
1992	Noises Off	Poppy	Theatre Folkan, Stockholm
1993	The Music of Andrew Lloyd Webber		Cirkusbygningen, Copenhagen, Denmark
1994	The Music of Andrew Lloyd Webber		St Paul's Cathedral, London
1994	Great Expectations	Estella	Apollo Theatre, London
1995	Les Misérables	Cosette	The Palace Theatre, London
1997	The Phantom of the Opera	Christine	Her Majesty's Theatre, London
1999	West Side Story	Maria	The Gothenburg Opera
2000	Joseph and the Amazing Technicolour Dreamcoat	The Narrator	UK
2000	West Side Story	Maria	Teatro dell'Opera, Rome
2000	One Touch of Kurt Weill		Theater Kilen in Kulturhuset, Stockholm
2001	Evita	Eva Perón	The Gothenburg Opera
2002	Evita	Eva Perón	Cirkus, Stockholm
2003	Myrra & Helen	Bit by Bit	The Malmö Opera
2005	Myrra & Helen	Bit by Bit	Riksteatern
2006	West Side Story	Maria	The China Theatre, Stockholm
2008	Jekyll and Hyde	Emma Carew	The China Theatre, Stockholm

== Filmography ==
- 2019 – Toy Story 4, "Andy's mother" Disney
- 2018 – Ralph Breaks the Internet, "Ariel and Princess Jasmine" Disney
- 2014 – Song of the Sea, "Bronagh" Cartoon Saloon
- 2012 – Secret of the Wings, "Healing Fairy" Disney
- 2011 – Happy Feet Two, "Norma Jean" Warner Bros
- 2010 – Toy Story 3, "Andy's mother" Disney
- 2009 – Hannah Montana: The Movie, "Lorelai" Disney
- 2008 – Kiki's Delivery Service, "Mrs Osono" Studio Ghibli
- 2008 – Deep Sea, "Narrator" IMAX
- 2008 – The Little Mermaid: Ariel's Beginning, "Ariel" Disney
- 2008 – Disney Princess Enchanted Tales: Follow Your Dreams, "Princess Jasmine" Disney
- 2007–2015 – Phineas and Ferb, "Linda Flynn-Fletcher" Disney
- 2007 – Kim Possible, "Shego" Disney
- 2007 – Happy Feet, "Norma Jean" Warner Bros
- 2006 – Underdog, "Polly" Disney
- 2005 – The Emperor's New Groove 2: Kronk's New Groove, "Miss Birdwell" Disney
- 2005 – Barbie and the Magic of Pegasus, "Brietta" Universal Pictures
- 2002 – Peter Pan II: Return to Never Land, "Wendy" Disney
- 2000 – The Little Mermaid II: Return to the Sea, "Ariel" Disney
- 1999 – The Magic Sword: Quest for Camelot, "Kayley" Warner Bros
- 1998 – Mary Poppins, "Mary Poppins" Disney
- 1997 – Beauty and the Beast: The Enchanted Christmas, "Angelique" Disney
- 1997 – Hercules, "Megara" Disney
- 1997 – 101 Dalmatians, "Anita" Disney
- 1996 – Aladdin and the King of Thieves, "Princess Jasmine" Disney
- 1994 – The Return of Jafar, "Princess Jasmine" Disney
- 1994 – Fallet Paragon, "Ulrika" Swedish Television Drama
- 1993 – Peter Pan, "Wendy" Disney
- 1993 – We're Back! A Dinosaur's Story, "Elsa and Dr. Bleeb" Amblin Entertainment and Steven Spielberg
- 1992 – Aladdin, "Princess Jasmine" Disney

== Discography ==
=== Solo albums ===
Album	Year	Label
What Can You Lose: Myrra Malmberg sings Sondheim	1995	Arietta Discs
Unexpected: Myrra Malmberg sings Lloyd Webber	1997	Arietta Discs
Julia	1999	Musikverkstan
Sweet Bossa	2003	Spice of Life Records
Serendipity	2004	BMG
Bossa Kiss Pop	2006	Kang & Music
Bossa Volym 1	2007	Arietta Discs
Bossa Volym 2	2007	Arietta Discs
Another World	2011	Warner Music

=== Cast recording & soundtracks ===
- 2009 – Bröderna Lejonhjärta, Naxos
- 2009 – Disney: En magisk värld, Egmont
- 2001 – Evita, Swedish cast, BMG
- 1997 – Hercules – Swedish soundtrack, Buena Vista
- 1995 – Great Expectations – Highlights Cast Recording, TER records
- 1994 – Aladdin: The Return of Jafar – Swedish soundtrack, Buena Vista
- 1993 – Aladdin – Swedish soundtrack, Buena Vista

=== Compilations ===
- 2010 – 100 Moments Lounge
- 2005 – Svenska Musikalfavoriter

=== Guest appearances ===
- 2005 – My Rubber Soul/Peter Nordahl Trio, BMG
- 1998 – Easy Listening för Masochister/Carl-Johan Vallgren, Twin
