= The Christmas in You =

Studio album by Jill Johnson
- Released: 16 November 2005
- Genre: Christmas
- Label: Lionheart Records

Jill Johnson chronology
Being Who You Are (2005)	The Christmas in You (2005)	The Woman I've Become (2006)

The Christmas in You was released on 16 November 2005 and is a Christmas album from Swedish pop and country singer Jill Johnson. The album was recorded in Nashville, Tennessee in the United States. It peaked at number three on the Swedish Albums Chart.

== Track listing ==
1. The Christmas in You
2. The Angels Cried
3. What Child Is This?
4. Blue December
5. Merry Christmas To You
6. Blame it on Christmas
7. Winter in July
8. Have Yourself a Merry Little Christmas
9. First Christmas in You
10. The Christmas Song
11. O Come All Ye Faithful (Adeste Fideles)
12. I Bring Christmas Back to You
13. I Want You for Christmas
14. I Wanna Wish You All a Merry Christmas
15. Down to the River to Pray

=== 2008 bonus tracks ===
- 16. When Christmas Was Mine
- 17. Big Bag Of Money

== Charts ==
=== Weekly charts ===
Chart (2005–2007)	Peak position
Swedish Albums (Sverigetopplistan)	3

=== Year-end charts ===
Chart (2005)	Position
Swedish Albums (Sverigetopplistan)	37
