= Radiant3 Productions =

Radiant3
- Company type: private
- Industry: Production Company
- Founded: Atlanta, Georgia, 2008
- Founder: James Boston
- Headquarters: Atlanta, Georgia, United States
- Key people: James Boston, Elle Richardson
- Products: Advertising, corporate video, Film
- Website: www.radiant3.com

Radiant3 is a video production company headquartered in Atlanta, Georgia, United States and founded in 2008 by James Boston. Radiant3 was nominated a "Top 25 Business" in 2010 by Atlanta Tribune Magazine. Radiant3 primarily films corporate video and advertisements.

Radiant3's client list includes McDonald's, AT&T Mobility, InComm, Graphic Packaging, Urban One, Hansgrohe, and Professional Photographers of America.

== Awards ==
The music video for Changed directed by Carl Diebold stars Chip Esten and won the ACM Award for "Mainstream Inspirational Country Video." Radiant3 also won a Silver Telly on a campaign for Professional Photographers of America and Bronze Telly on a campaign for Dura-Line.
