= The Woman I've Become (album) =

Studio album by Jill Johnson
- Released: 25 October 2006
- Genre: Country
- Label: Lionheart
- Producer: Nathan Chapman

Jill Johnson chronology
The Christmas in You (2005)	The Woman I've Become (2006)	Music Row (2007)

The Woman I've Become is the ninth album by Swedish pop and country singer Jill Johnson, released on 25 October 2006. The album was recorded in Nashville and was produced by Nathan Chapman and his musicians. It peaked at number two on the Swedish albums chart and was certified gold.

== Track listing ==
1. "Till the Cowboys Come Home"
2. "When Love Doesn't Love You"
3. "Blessed Are the Brokenhearted"
4. "Baby Don't Go"
5. "Same Everything"
6. "Cowboy Up"
7. "I'm Sorry"
8. "Something I Can't Do"
9. "Love Ain't Nothin'"
10. "Too Late to Be Drinkin'"
11. "Everybody Smile"
12. "Red Corvette"
13. "The Woman I've Become"

== Charts ==
Chart (2006–2007)	Peak position
Swedish Albums (Sverigetopplistan)	2

== Certifications ==
Certifications for The Woman I've Become
Region	Certification	Certified units/sales
Sweden (GLF)	Gold	30,000^{^}
^{^} Shipments figures based on certification alone.
