= Kommer tid, kommer vår =

1996 song performed by Jan Johansen & Jill Johnson

Single by Jan Johansen & Jill Johnson
- A-side: "Kommer tid, kommer vår"
- Released: 1996
- Genre: pop, schlager
- Songwriters: Jon van der Bring (music), Fredrik Möller (lyrics)

"Kommer tid, kommer vår" is a song with music by Jon van der Bring and lyrics Fredrik Möller. The song is intended to be sung as a vocal duet.

The original recording was done by Jan Johansen and Jill Johnson, and became a major Sveriges Radio hit during 1996, and also reached Svensktoppen staying at the chart during the period of 25 May-2 June 1996, with a sixth respective a fourth position. Together, Jan Johansen and Jill Johnson also toured the folkparks of Sweden together that summer.

At the singles chart the Jan Johansen and Jill Johnson recording reached 13th position in Norway and 38th position in Sweden.

After the Elisabeth Andreassen song "I evighet" had ended up 2nd in the Eurovision Song Contest 1996 Jan Johansen and Elisabeth Andreassen recorded the song with lyrics in Swedish and released it as a single in Norway. It was originally intended to be sung in Norwegian, but Jan Johansen thought singing in Swedish was "simpler".

== Charts ==
=== Jan Johansen & Jill Johnson version ===
Chart (1996)	Peak position
Norway (VG-lista)	13
Sweden (Sverigetopplistan)	38
