= Music Row (album) =

Studio album by Jill Johnson
- Released: 28 November 2007
- Genre: Country, pop
- Length: 54:46
- Label: Lionheart Records
- Producer: Scott Baggett

Jill Johnson chronology
The Woman I've Become (2006)	Music Row (2007)	Baby Blue Paper (2008)

Music Row is a cover album by Jill Johnson, recorded in Nashville and released on 28 November 2007. The album sold platinum in Sweden and peaked at number three on the Swedish Albums Chart.

== Track listing ==
1. Rhythm Guitar - 3.20
2. Jolene - 3.30
3. Why'd You Come in Here Lookin' Like That (duet with Nina Persson) - 2.41
4. Angel of the Morning - 3.56
5. Papa Come Quick - 3.09
6. Mama He's Crazy - 3.21
7. Tumbling Dice (duet with Kim Carnes) - 3.37
8. You're No Good - 3.43
9. Why Not Me - 4.04
10. Life in the Fast Lane - 4.37
11. You Don't Have to Say You Love Me (Io che non vivo senza te) - 4.14
12. Need Your Love So Bad - 4.31
13. To Know Him Is to Love Him (duet with Lisa Miskovsky) - 3.56
14. Angel from Montgomery - 6.07

== Charts ==
Chart (2007–2008)	Peak position
Swedish Albums (Sverigetopplistan)	3
