= Kärleken är =

1998 song by Jill Johnson

Single by Jill Johnson
- Language: Swedish
- Released: 1998
- Composers: Håkan Almqvist; Bobby Ljunggren
- Lyricist: Ingela Forsman

Eurovision Song Contest 1998 entry
- Country: Sweden
- Artist: Jill Johnson
- Language: Swedish
- Composers: Håkan Almqvist; Bobby Ljunggren
- Lyricist: Ingela Forsman
- Conductor: Anders Berglund

Finals performance
- Final result: 10th
- Final points: 53

Entry chronology
- ◄ "Bara hon älskar mig" (1997)
- "Take Me to Your Heaven" (1999) ►

"Kärleken är" (Swedish pronunciation: [ˈɕæ̂ːˌɭeːkɛn ˈæːr]; literally "[The] Love Is"; English title: "Eternal Love") is a song by Swedish pop and country singer Jill Johnson. A Swedish-language ballad about love, it was written by Ingela Forsman, Bobby Ljunggren and Håkan Almqvist, won the Melodifestivalen 1998, and represented Sweden in the Eurovision Song Contest 1998. It finished 10th with 53 points. It was the last Swedish entry in the contest to be sung in Swedish until 2025.

Although lyricist Ingela "Pling" Forsman did not comment on the background of the song when it won Melodifestivalen and competed at Eurovision, she has since confirmed that the lyrics indeed were inspired by the aftermath of the death of Diana, Princess of Wales, in a car accident in France in 1997. The chorus in Swedish translates as follows: "An angel flew by on her way to heaven, so free, but she left her smile here on earth – like a warming sun, like heavenly starlight, so that we can contemplate life and its events with a faith; love is..."

== Single ==
The single "Kärleken är" was released on 20 March 1998. It reached #5 on the Swedish Singles Chart.

=== Track listing ===
1. "Kärleken är" (radio version) – 3:00
2. "Kärleken är" (instrumental version) – 3:00

== List placings ==
=== Svensktoppen ===
"Kärleken är" entered the Sveriges Radio radio chart Svensktoppen on 2 May 1998 at #1 and spent a total of six weeks on the listing.

=== Tracks ===
"Kärleken är" also featured on Sveriges Radio's hit list Trackslistan. On 11 April 1998 the song entered the list, and spent eight weeks on the chart, peaking at #6 on 16 May 1998.

== English ==
Jill Johnson recorded the song on her 1998 album När hela världen ser på, both in its Swedish and English versions, the latter entitled "Eternal Love" and retaining the theme of the original Swedish lyrics.

== Charts ==
Chart (1998)	Peak position
Sweden (Sverigetopplistan)	5

Preceded by "Bara hon älskar mig" by Blond	Melodifestivalen winners 1998	Succeeded by "Tusen och en natt" by Charlotte Nilsson
