= Sweden in the Eurovision Song Contest 1998 =

- Eurovision Song Contest 1998
- Participating broadcaster: Sveriges Television (SVT)
- Country: Sweden
- Selection process: Melodifestivalen 1998
- Selection date: 14 March 1998

Competing entry
- Song: "Kärleken är"
- Artist: Jill Johnson
- Songwriters: Håkan Almqvist; Bobby Ljunggren; Ingela "Pling" Forsman

Placement
- Final result: 10th, 53 points

Participation chronology

Sweden was represented at the Eurovision Song Contest 1998 with the song "Kärleken är", composed by Håkan Almqvist and Bobby Ljunggren, with lyrics by Ingela "Pling" Forsman, and performed by Jill Johnson. The Swedish participating broadcaster, Sveriges Television (SVT), selected its entry through Melodifestivalen 1998.

== Before Eurovision ==
=== Melodifestivalen 1998 ===
Melodifestivalen 1998 was the selection for the 38th song to represent Sweden at the Eurovision Song Contest. It was the 37th time that this system of picking a song had been used. 1,141 songs were submitted to Sveriges Television (SVT) for the competition, with ten songs selected to compete. Five of the songs were eliminated and the remaining five were voted on by 11 regional juries. The final was held in the Malmö Musikteater in Malmö on 14 March 1998, presented by Pernilla Månsson and Magnus Karlsson, and was broadcast on SVT2 and Sveriges Radio's P4 network. The show was watched by 2,881,000 people and the winner was "Kärleken är", sung by Jill Johnson and composed by Bobby Ljunggren, Håkan Almqvist and Ingela "Pling" Forsman.

First Round – 14 March 1998
R/O	Artist	Song	Songwriter(s)	Result
1	Annika Fehling	"När en stjärna faller"	Annika Fehling	—N/a
2	B.I.G.	"Ingen annan väg"	Peo Thyrén, Richard Evenlind, Erika Evenlind, Stefan Almqvist	Advanced
3	Elisabeth Melander	"Ta dej tid"	Margareta Nilsson, Gertrud Hemmel	—N/a
4	Nanne Grönvall	"Avundsjuk"	Peter Grönvall, Nanne Grönvall	Advanced
5	Linda Eriksson	"Bara månen får se"	Torgny Söderberg	—N/a
6	Helena Eriksson	"Kärleken finns överallt"	Frank Ådahl	—N/a
7	Fredrik Karlsson	"Långsamma timmar"	Fredrik Karlsson, Peter Svensson	—N/a
8	Myrra Malmberg	"Julia"	Claes Andreasson, Torbjörn Wassenius	Advanced
9	Black Ingvars	"Cherie"	Stephan Berg	Advanced
10	Jill Johnson	"Kärleken är"	Bobby Ljunggren, Håkan Almqvist, Ingela "Pling" Forsman	Advanced

Second Round – 14 March 1998
R/O	Artist	Song	Points	Place
1	B.I.G.	"Ingen annan väg"	52	2
2	Nanne Grönvall	"Avundsjuk"	35	4
3	Myrra Malmberg	"Julia"	38	3
4	Black Ingvars	"Cherie"	34	5
5	Jill Johnson	"Kärleken är"	72	1

Detailed Regional Jury Voting
R/O	Song	Luleå	Örebro	Umeå	Norrköping	Falun	Karlstad	Sundsvall	Växjö	Stockholm	Gothenburg	Malmö	Total
1	"Ingen annan väg"	8	6	6	4	6	2	4	4	2	2	8	52
2	"Avundsjuk"	1	1	1	6	2	4	6	2	4	4	4	35
3	"Julia"	4	4	2	1	1	8	2	8	1	6	1	38
4	"Cherie"	2	2	8	2	4	1	1	1	6	1	6	34
5	"Kärleken är"	6	8	4	8	8	6	8	6	8	8	2	72

== At Eurovision ==
Johnson sang in the 19th position on the night of the contest, and at the close of voting she finished 10th out of 25 countries, receiving 53 points. The Swedish televoting awarded its 12 points to Norway.

=== Voting ===
Points awarded to Sweden
Score	Country
12 points	Estonia
10 points	Norway
8 points	Hungary
7 points	
6 points	Finland
5 points	Netherlands
4 points	Malta
3 points	Poland
2 points	Ireland; Turkey
1 point	United Kingdom

Points awarded by Sweden
Score	Country
12 points	Norway
10 points	Finland
8 points	Netherlands
7 points	United Kingdom
6 points	Malta
5 points	Israel
4 points	Estonia
3 points	Croatia
2 points	Belgium
1 point	Ireland
