= Baby Blue Paper =

- Album cover

Studio album by Jill Johnson
- Released: 22 October 2008
- Genre: Blues, country, rock
- Length: 49:35
- Label: Lionheart Records
- Producer: Scott Baggett, Tom Harding

Jill Johnson chronology
Music Row (2007)	Baby Blue Paper (2008)	Music Row II (2009)

Baby Blue Paper is the eleventh album from Swedish pop and country singer Jill Johnson, released on 22 October 2008. The album was recorded in Nashville. It peaked at #3 at the Swedish album charts.

== Track listing ==
No.	Title	Writer(s)	Length
1.	"Say Something"	Lisa Carver, Liz Rose	4:12
2.	"You're Looking for Me"	Bruce Wallace, Liz Rose	3:31
3.	"Love Lessons"	Scott Baggett	4:18
4.	"Where the Rainbow Ends"	Aleena Gibson, Peter Kvint	2:59
5.	"You Think You're the Man"	Liz Rose, Stephanie Chapman	3:06
6.	"I Should've Left Sooner"	Liz Rose, Lori McKenna	3:49
7.	"You Better Think Again"	Scott Baggett	3:56
8.	"Top of the World"	Aleena Gibson, Peter Kvint	3:35
9.	"Better than Me"	Lisa Carver, Liz Rose	3:28
10.	"What Happened to Us"	Rachel Thibodeau, Rebecca Lynn Howard	5:04
11.	"Don't Feel Like Me"	Jessie Alexander, Liz Rose	4:04
12.	"Little Girl of Mine"	Liz Rose, Pam Rose	4:02
13.	"Baby Blue Paper"	Liz Rose, Pam Rose	3:28

== Personnel ==
- Scott Baggett - electric guitar, acoustic guitar, keyboards, bass
- Mike Brignardello - bass
- Pat Buchanan - electric guitar, acoustic guitar, harmonica
- Tom Bukovac - electric guitar, piano
- Chris Carmichael - cello, viola, violin
- Mike Durham - electric guitar
- Tony Harrell - keyboards, electric guitar
- Mark Hill - bass
- Jim Hoke - alto saxophone, baritone saxophone, tenor saxophone, pedal steel guitar
- Don Jackson - saxophone
- Walter King - saxophone
- Greg Morrow - drums
- Russ Pahl - lap steel guitar, electric guitar
- Tom Roady - percussion
- Jerry Roe - drums
- Mike Rojas - keyboards
- James Williamsson - trumpet
- John Willis - acoustic guitar
- Jonathan Yudkin - mandolin, viola

Backing vocals

- Chris Byrne
- Britton Cameron
- Melodie Crittenden
- KK Falkner
- Jason McCoy
- Crystal Taliefero
- Russel Terrell

== Charts ==
=== Weekly charts ===
Chart (2008–2009)	Peak position
Swedish Albums (Sverigetopplistan)	3

=== Year-end charts ===
Chart (2008)	Position
Swedish Albums (Sverigetopplistan)	39
Chart (2009)	Position
Swedish Albums (Sverigetopplistan)	89

== Certifications ==
Region	Certification	Certified units/sales
Sweden (GLF)	Gold	20,000^{^}
^{^} Shipments figures based on certification alone.
