= Aaron Espe =

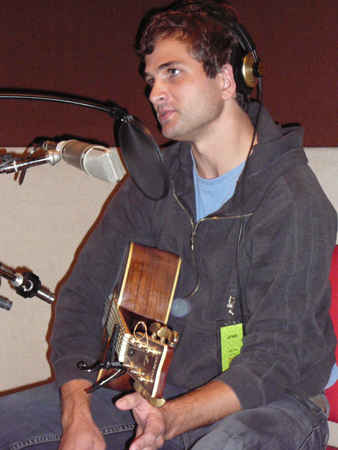

Background information
- Born: Aaron Sheldon Espe; August 27, 1981 (age 45); Roseau, Minnesota
- Genre: Pop
- Occupations: Singer-songwriter, record producer, musician
- Instrument: Vocals guitar
- Website: aaronespe.com

Aaron Sheldon Espe (born August 27, 1981) is an American singer-songwriter, instrumentalist and record producer.

== Biography ==
Of Norwegian and Swedish descent, Espe, the third of four children, was born in Roseau, Minnesota, a small town with a population of 2633. The son of an electrician and piano teacher, he began singing in church alongside his sisters, with mom at the piano and dad leading the congregation in song. This was Espe's first introduction to music equipment: speakers, amplifiers, microphones, and years later, drums. Piano lessons came at the age of six, and after seeing a concert at the age of 14, he went to his grandfather to borrow a guitar and learn to play. This lesson consisted of a few chords written on a piece of paper with an explanation of how to play them.

Espe was educated at The University of North Dakota and Colorado State University where he studied English Literature.

In 2004, Espe was introduced to touring by opening for the folk duo Storyhill in Minneapolis. Chris Cunningham (member of the duo) took Espe under his wing and invited him to open on his solo sets around Minnesota. After a self-released album in 2005, Espe continued to open for Storyhill. He toured solo across the U.S., including Western Alaska. He played in coffee shops, bars, churches, and a yoga studio once. Espe toured Northern Ireland opening for Juliet Turner and Brian Houston. He also opened for The Fray and John Gorka.

In 2011 Espe moved to Nashville, Tennessee and signed his first publishing contract with JMHB and Revelry Music Group in January 2012.

Espe signed a recording contract with Nettwerk in November 2012 and released the self-produced "Through Frozen Forests" – EP in December 2012.

He sings and plays guitar and has released six solo albums. Espe is also the front man in Bombs Over Nowhere with busbee, and a member of the band Haviland, alongside Mike Ayers (guitarist of Meese). Espe's music has appeared in various television shows on MTV, Animal Planet, and VH1 as well as commercial's for Sainsbury's, Payless ShoeSource, and The University of Minnesota. Espe's music also appeared on the soundtrack for the film, "Where the Yellowstone Goes.”

Espe's album Three was co-produced with The Fray guitarist, Dave Welsh, and mastered by Thom Donovan. Ben Wysocki of The Fray, played drums on Espe's Songs from a Small Town and co-produced Christmas Songs.

His song "Back to the Beginning" plays over the final scenes of season three, episode one of Ricky Gervais series After Life.

== Discography ==
=== Solo ===
- My Whole Life (2005)
- Songs from a Small Town (2008)
- Christmas Songs (2008)
- Three (2012)
- Tennessee Sky (2012)
- Through Frozen Forests (2012)
- This Time of the Year (2017)
- Up North (2022)

=== With Haviland ===
- An Introduction – EP (2011)
- "Never Wanted to Fall in Love" – Single (2012)
