= Crazy in Love (Jill Johnson song) =

Single by Jill Johnson

from the album Discography
- Released: 10 March 2003
- Genre: Pop, country
- Length: 3:00
- Songwriter(s): Lennart Wastesson, Larry Forsberg, Sven-Inge Sjöberg

Jill Johnson singles chronology
"Luckiest People" (2002)	"Crazy in Love" (2003)	"Can't Get Enough of You" (2003)

"Crazy in Love" is a song in English, written by Lennart Wastesson, Larry Forsberg, and Sven-Inge Sjöberg, and performed by Swedish pop and country singer Jill Johnson at the Swedish Melodifestivalen 2003, where "Crazy in Love" finished 4th. However, "Crazy in Love" became a Svensktoppen hit in 2003, where it got 13404 points and stayed for 36 weeks. The best placement there was a 1st place.

The single peaked at #9 at the Swedish singles chart.

== Charts ==
Chart (2003)	Peak position
Sweden (Sverigetopplistan)	9
