= Jills veranda =

- Genre: documentary
- Country of origin: Sweden
- Original language: Swedish
- No. of seasons: 4
- No. of episodes: 18

Original release
- Network: SVT1
- Release: 22 January 2014 – 2020

Jills veranda (Jill's veranda) is an SVT documentary series. In the programmes, Swedish female country singer Jill Johnson invites six Swedish artists to explore the town of Nashville together with her. Jill Johnson and the guest artists sing and play, explore the history of country music and encounter social issues in the USA like racism, high number of weapons, homophobia and poverty.

Recording of the first season began in Nashville during mid-2013, and broadcast began in early 2014. The programme was awarded Kristallen 2014 in the category "programme of the year" and " reality programme of the year". Jill Johnson also won in the "Female show host of the year" category.

== Contributors ==
=== Season 1 ===
1. 22 January 2014 - Titiyo Jah
2. 29 January 2014 - Kakan Hermansson
3. 5 February 2014 - Rikard "Skizz" Bizzi
4. 12 February 2014 - Marit Bergman
5. 26 February 2014 - Kristian Gidlund
6. 5 March 2014 - Magnus Carlson, Doug Seegers

==== Season 2 ====
1. 11 November 2015 - Seinabo Sey
2. 18 November 2015 - Joel Alme
3. 25 November 2015 - Veronica Maggio
4. 2 December 2015 - Jerry Williams
5. 9 December 2015 - Adam Baptiste
6. 16 December 2015 - Annika Norlin

=== Season 3 ===
1. 15 November 2017 – Maxida Märak, Bill Miller
2. 22 November 2017 – Mia Skäringer
3. 29 November 2017 – Dregen
4. 6 December 2017 – Lisa Nilsson
5. 13 December 2017 – Ana Diaz
6. 20 December 2017 – Erik Lundin

=== Season 4 ===
1. 12 February 2020 – Miriam Bryant
2. 19 February 2020 – Mikael Wiehe
3. 26 February 2020 – Emil Svanängen
4. 4 March 2020 – Shima Niavarani
5. 11 March 2020 – Amanda Werne
6. 18 March 2020 – Mauro Scocco

=== 2020 Special ===
1. 23 July 2020 – Jill i Lilla Hult was broadcast from café Lilla Ro outside Ängelholm including Maja Francis
