= Magnus Carlson =

Swedish musician (born 1968)

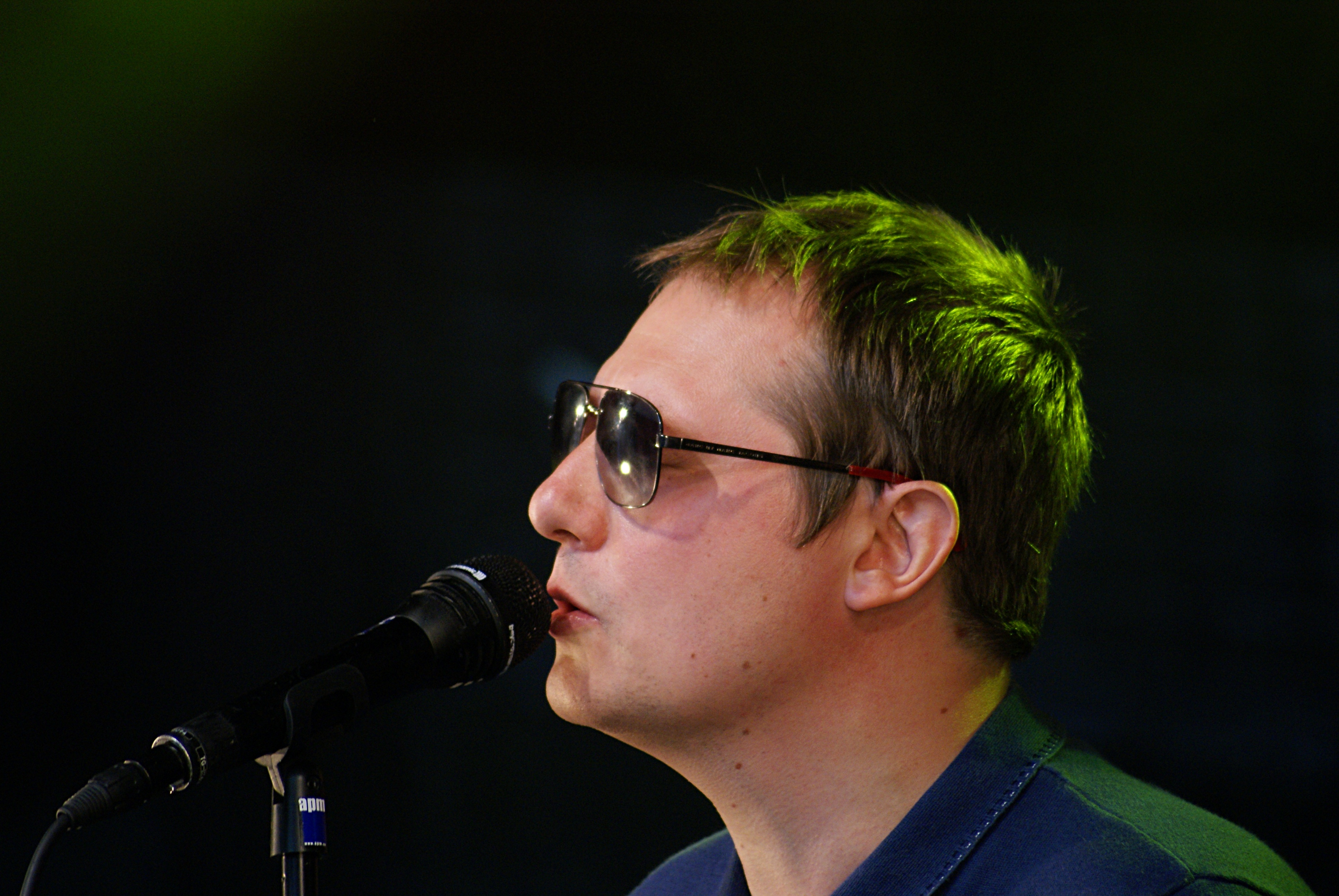

Background information
- Born: 3 August 1968 (age 58)
- Origin: Stockholm, Sweden
- Genres: Soul; indie rock; jazz; indie pop
- Years active: 1995–present
- Labels: Warner; EMI; Blue Note

Magnus Carlson (born 3 August 1968) is a Swedish singer, composer, songwriter, DJ, and record collector. After playing in various cover bands in the nineties he formed the indie group, Weeping Willows. Their 1997 debut album was an instant success and the band soon became a national household name. In 2003 Magnus launched what would become a very successful solo career, establishing him as a prominent male artist in Sweden. He has released a total of 16 albums in the last twenty years, several of them gold and platinum records and he's collaborated with numerous artists. These collaborations include duets with singer Anna Ternheim, house tracks with members of Swedish House Mafia, performing Velvet Underground-covers with Nina Persson of The Cardigans and Ebbot Lundberg of The Soundtrack of Our Lives, selling out concert halls performing an acclaimed Royal Symphony Orchestral tribute to the late David Bowie, and playing horns with Noel Gallagher's High Flying Birds.

In general, his passion for music comes from his love of the sixties, which is particularly evident in his most recent releases. In the autumn of 2017, he released a string of authentic northern soul singles followed up by Motown/Spector-influenced Christmas mini-album together with Weeping Willows. A jazz EP is lined up for release in 2018, as is his first ever full-length solo album in the UK, which was largely recorded and produced by Andy Lewis at Paul Weller's Black Barn studio in Surrey.

== Discography ==
=== Albums ===
- 2001 – Allt är bara du, du, du - featuring Håkan Hellström, Mick Jones and Joakim Thåström
- 2006 – Ett Kungarike För En Kram
- 2009 – Magnus Carlson & The Moon Ray Quintet
- 2010 – Echoes
- 2013 – Tandem Sky
- 2016 – Tolkningarna – Så mycket bättre Säsong 7
- 2017 – Den långa vägen hem
