= Jill Johnson =

Swedish singer-songwriter (born 1973)

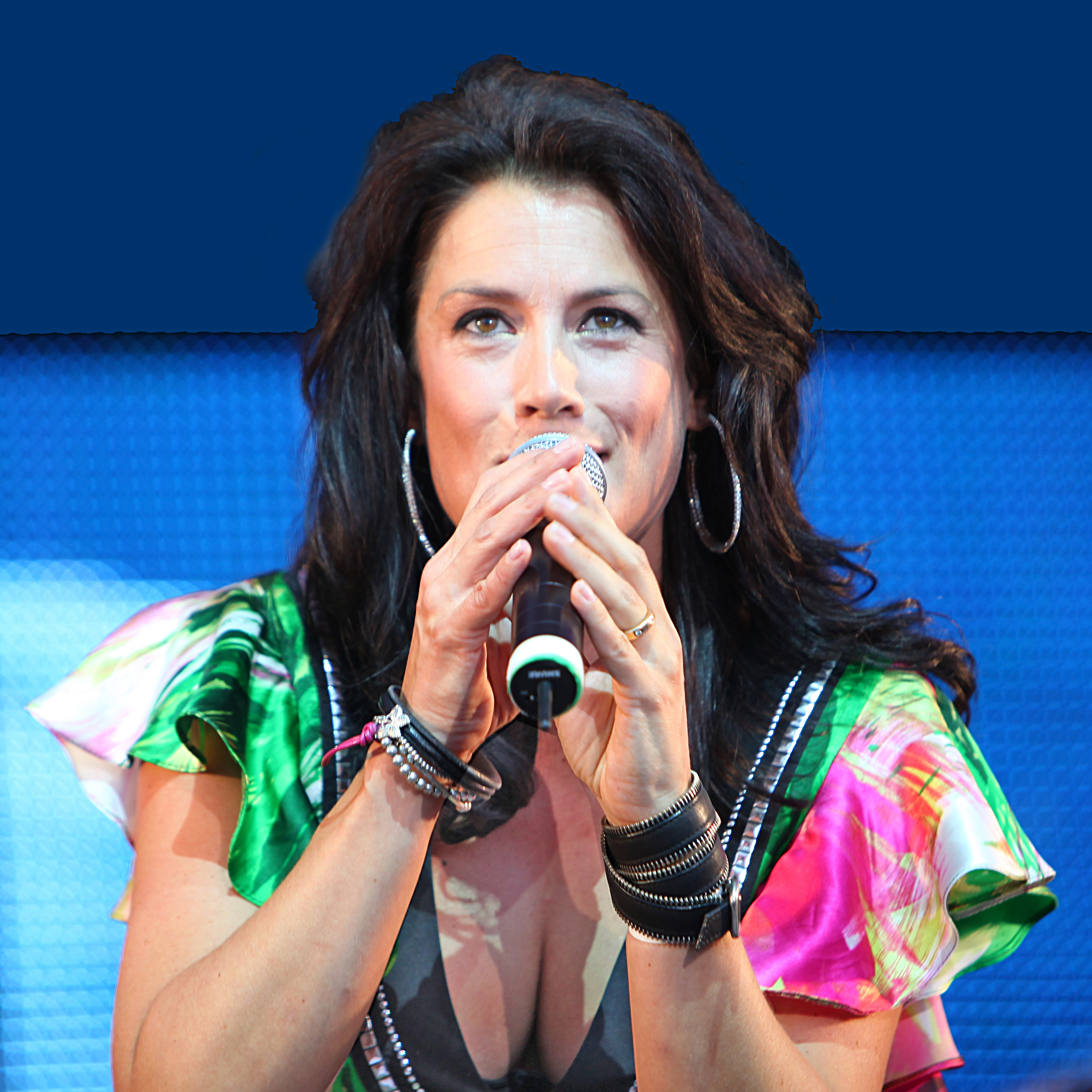
- Johnson in 2009

Background information
- Born: Jill Anna Maria Johnson; 24 May 1973 (age 52); Ängelholm, Sweden
- Genres: Country; country rock; pop; schlager
- Instrument: Vocals
- Years active: 1996–present
- Labels: Freebird Entertainment
- Website: jilljohnson.se

Jill Anna Maria Johnson (born 24 May 1973) is a Swedish country and pop singer, songwriter and TV-host. She performed in the Melodifestivalen 1998 contest, winning with the song "Kärleken är" ("Love Is"), and represented Sweden at the Eurovision Song Contest 1998 with that song, which finished 10th with 53 points. In 2003 she entered Melodifestivalen for the second time with "Crazy in Love", which finished fourth in the final. She also hosted the final of Melodifestivalen 2005. Johnson is today one of the most successful artists in Sweden, with several Gold and Platinum records and since 2014 has hosted her own Swedish TV-show from Nashville, Jills veranda.

== Biography ==
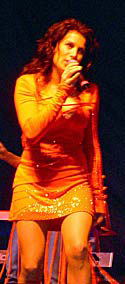
Johnson in 2003

Johnson is from the small town of Ängelholm in the south western part of Sweden. By the age of four, she had decided she wanted to become an artist, an aspiration towards which she was highly encouraged by her local choir leader. As a 12-year-old, she started off as the vocalist in a Country & Western band, Tomboola Band, touring in Norway and Denmark. She signed eventually with EMI-Medley in Denmark and recorded an album, produced by producer Paul Bruun. The title-track, "Sugar Tree", became a hit in Denmark. In 1996, she had her first Swedish hit with "Kommer tid, kommer vår", a duet with Jan Johansen.

In 1998, she performed "Kärleken är" ("Love is") at national contest Melodifestivalen, winning the Swedish finals and going on to represent Sweden in the Eurovision Song Contest. The success was followed by the hit album När hela världen ser på and a successful tour.

In mid-1999, Johnson went to Los Angeles to look for material for her second album. At home, she worked with Andreas Carlsson (ASCAP Writer of the Year 2000), who is known for several hits, including Celine Dion's "That's the Way It Is". She also tried out a few local newcomers and the album Daughter of Eve was released in early 2000. It was very well received and Johnson was compared with some of the world's best artists.

In 2000, she received a Platinum-record in Denmark for the sound-track "Promise To Love" from the Danish block-buster, Eneste Ene. Later that year, Johnson started to collaborate with other songwriters such as Jenny Orenstein, Charlie Stefl, Mary Green [Biem Writer of the Year 2001]. This resulted in her receiving a publishing contract in Nashville, Tennessee. Consequently, in 2002 Johnson's album entitled Good Girl came to be with the help of producer Scott Baggett and some of Nashville's top musicians. This album secured Johnson's artistic sound and style and once again she was extremely well received by the press in their reviews where she was described as an artist of international calibre.

In the Swedish finals of the Eurovision Song Contest 2003 she qualified at fourth place (out of 32 entries) but and her song "Crazy in Love" became a hit and received a great deal of radio play and was followed by a successful tour.

Johnson's collective Discography CD was released in late March 2003. It contains the 20 most popular songs since her debut in 1995. The CD went straight into the sales charts for best selling CDs in Sweden. The single "Crazy in Love" stayed at No 1 in the Swedish Top Charts (Svensktoppen) 12 weeks consecutively and No 2 for 15 weeks. Discography sold Gold in Sweden and Johnson also got a Grammis for this album.

The album Roots and Wings was released in November 2003, recorded and produced by Amir Aly in Sweden and by Scott Baggett in Nashville, Tennessee. Roots and Wings sold Gold in less than two weeks and Platinum a few months later.

The album Being who you are was released in Sweden in late March 2005 and sold Gold in only a few weeks.

Johnson was the host of the 2005 Swedish finals of the Eurovision Song Contest in Stockholm. In 2014 she became the hostess of her own Swedish musical TV-series, Jills veranda, where she brought together and performed with different Swedish and American music personalities in Nashville, the city where she also spends much time working with her own music. In 2014, she was awarded with the Swedish Kristallen-prize for "Female host of the year", due to Jills veranda. The show aired two following seasons in 2015 and 2017. In 2016 she participated in the popular musical TV-series Så mycket bättre, which was broadcast on TV4.

In 2019, Jill released the single "Is It Hard Being A Man?" among others which topped the Swedish radio charts. The same year, Jill went on a club tour, "My Remedy Tour", which visited fifteen citites and premiered on 8 March in Malmö. On 18 August 2019, Jill hosted her own episode in the popular Swedish radio show Sommar i P1.

Johnson will play the role as Camilla in the Swedish TV-series "Udda Veckor", which airs on Discovery+ during the spring of 2021. Jill's participation in the show marks her debut as an actress in a fictional role.

== Discography ==
=== Albums ===
Studio albums

Title	Details	Peak positions	Certifications (sales threshold)
Title	Details	SWE	Certifications (sales threshold)
Sugartree	Release date: 28 March 1996; Label: EMI; Formats: CD, cassette	—	
När hela världen ser på	Release date: 10 May 1998; Label: Lionheart Records; Formats: CD, cassette	37	
Daughter of Eve	Release date: 30 November 2000; Label: Lionheart Records; Formats: CD, cassette	59	
Good Girl	Release date: 2002; Label: Lionheart Records; Formats: CD, cassette	37	
Roots and Wings	Release date: 26 November 2003; Label: Lionheart Records; Formats: CD, music download	5	SWE: Platinum
Being Who You Are	Release date: 23 March 2005; Label: Lionheart Records; Formats: CD, music download	4	SWE: Gold
The Woman I've Become	Release date: 25 October 2006; Label: Lionheart Records; Formats: CD, music download	2	SWE: Gold
Music Row	Release date: 28 November 2007; Label: Lionheart Records; Formats: CD, music download	2	SWE: Platinum
Baby Blue Paper	Release date: October 2008; Label: Lionheart Records; Formats: CD, music download	3	SWE: Gold
Music Row II	Release date: 28 October 2009; Label: Lionheart Records; Formats: CD, music download	2	
Flirting with Disaster	Release date: 7 October 2011; Label: Lionheart Records; Formats: CD, music download	1	
A Woman Can Change Her Mind	Release date: 7 November 2012; Label: Lionheart Records; Formats: CD, music download	3	
Duetterna	Release date: 25 October 2013; Label: Lionheart Records; Formats: CD, music download	—	
Songs for Daddy	Release date: 22 October 2014; Label: Lionheart Records / Universal Records; Formats: CD, music download	1	
In Tandem (with Doug Seegers)	Release date: March 2015; Label: Capitol Music Group / Universal Records; Formats: CD, music download	1	
For You I'll Wait	Release date: 23 September 2016; Label: Lionheart Records / Universal Records; Formats: CD, music download	3	
Tolkningarna – Så mycket bättre säsong 7	Release date: 11 December 2016; Label: Capitol Music Group; Formats: CD, music download	37	
"—" denotes releases that did not chart

Compilation albums

Title	Details	Peak positions	Certifications (sales threshold)
Title	Details	SWE	Certifications (sales threshold)
Discography	Release date: 27 March 2003; Label: Lionheart Records; Formats: CD, music download	4	SWE: Platinum
The Well-Known And Some Other Favourite Stories	Release date: 27 October 2010; Label: Lionheart Records; Formats: CD, music download	2	

Christmas albums

Title	Details	Peak positions	Certifications (sales threshold)
Title	Details	SWE	Certifications (sales threshold)
The Christmas in You	Release date: 16 November 2005; Label: Lionheart Records; Formats: CD, music download	3	SWE: Gold
Välkommen jul	Release date: November 2011; Label: Lionheart Records; Formats: CD	-	
Christmas Island	Release date: 27 October 2017; Label: Lionheart Records; Formats: CD	9	

Live albums

Title	Details	Peak positions	Certifications (sales threshold)
Title	Details	SWE	Certifications (sales threshold)
Livemusiken från Jills veranda	Release date: March 2014; Label: Lionheart Records; Formats: CD, music download	1	SWE: Gold
Livemusiken från Jills veranda, Nashville säsong 2	Release date: December 2015; Label: Lionheart Records; Formats: CD, music download	11	
Livemusiken från Jills veranda, Nashville säsong 3	Release date: 14 December 2017; Label: Sveriges Television; Format: Music download	38	

=== Extended plays ===
Title	Details	Peak positions
Title	Details	SWE
Rodeo	Release date: 4 August 2017; Label: Capitol Music Group; Formats: CD, music download	11

=== Singles ===
Year	Single	Peak positions	Album
Year	Single	SWE	Album
1995	"Shake the Sugartree"	—	Sugartree
1996	"All Kinds of People"	—	Sugartree
1998	"Kärleken är" ("Eternal Love")	5	När hela världen ser på
1998	"När hela världen ser på"	—	När hela världen ser på
2000	"Mother's Jewel"	—	Daughter of Ever
2000	"Secrets in My Life"	—	Daughter of Ever
2000	"It's Only You"	—	Daughter of Ever
2001	"Jump in a Car"	—	Good Girl
2002	"What's Wrong with You"	—	Good Girl
2002	"Luckiest People"	—	Good Girl
2003	"Crazy in Love"	9	Discography, 1996–2003
2003	"Can't Get Enough of You"	27	Roots and Wings
2004	"Hopelessly Devoted to You"	—	Roots and Wings
2004	"God's Gift"	12	Roots and Wings
2005	"God Bless a Girl in Love"	37	Being Who You Are
2005	"A Little Bit More"	—	Being Who You Are
2006	"Cowboy Up"	32	The Woman I've Become
2006	"Baby Don't Go"	—	The Woman I've Become
2007	"Angel of the Morning"	30	Music Row
2008	"Jolene"	—	Music Row
2008	"Top of the World"	56	Baby Blue Paper
2009	"It's a Heartache"	—	Music Row II
2016	"Open Your Heart"	2	Så mycket bättre
2016	"The Burden"	93	TBA
2016	"Himlen är oskyldigt blå"	75	TBA
2019	"Aqualung"	— (Note: "Aqualung" did not enter the Swedish Singellista Chart, but peaked at number four on the Swedish Heatseeker Chart.)	Så mycket bättre
2019	"Are You Ready"	— (Note: "Are You Ready" did not enter the Swedish Singellista Chart, but peaked at number three on the Swedish Heatseeker Chart.)	Så mycket bättre
2020	"Miles of Blue" (feat. Robin Stjernberg)		
2020	"When I Get Older"		
"—" denotes releases that did not chart

=== Music videos ===
Year	Video
1996	"Kärleken är"
2000	"Mother's Jewel"
2001	"Jump in a Car
2006	"Cowboy Up"

Awards and achievements
Preceded by Blond with "Bara hon älskar mig"	Sweden in the Eurovision Song Contest; 1998	Succeeded by Charlotte Nilsson with "Take Me to Your Heaven"
