= Free (Dana International album) =

Studio album by Dana International
- Released: 1999, 2000
- Recorded: 1999, 2000
- Genres: Dance; pop
- Labels: CNR Music; FM Records; Star Records; NMC Records; Network Records

Dana International chronology
The Album (1998)	Free (1999)	Yoter VeYoter (2001)

Alternative cover
- Israeli edition

Free is the fifth studio album by Israeli singer Dana International, released in 1999, the year after she won the Eurovision Song Contest 1998 with the song "Diva"; it includes an alternative version of the track. The album was produced by Dutch production team Bolland & Bolland with additional production and remix by influential Israeli DJ Offer Nissim.

The title song, "Free", a Stevie Wonder cover, sung in a medley with a version of a traditional prayer for freedom, "Dror Yikra", was performed as part of the interval act in the Eurovision Song Contest 1999 held in Jerusalem. The album also includes a cover version of Barbra Streisand's 1980 hit "Woman In Love". The Free album, in fact Dana International's international debut, was released in three different editions: European, Japanese and Israeli. The album mainly contains songs in English; however, one or two Hebrew tracks appear as well and even more so on the Israeli edition.

The European editions have three catalogue numbers:

- CNR 5300351 (on CNR Music, Continental Europe and Scandinavia)
- FM 1106 (on FM Records, Greece)
- CDPRC 0043 (on Star Records, South Africa)

The Free album was released in a different version in Japan in January 2000 and in Israel in March 2000. Most tracks were remixed for the Japanese and Israeli editions and are different from the ones on the European album. They also contain additional tracks not found on the European editions. The version of "Dror Yikra" on the European edition of the album is slightly different from the one used in the intermission show of the 1999 Eurovision final - that version is only available on the Israeli edition of the "Free" single.

The Japanese version was released in 2000 on Network Records with the catalogue number NXCA 00003.

The Israeli edition was released in 2000 on NMC records with the catalogue number NMC 20457 2. This edition also includes the video of "Woman in Love" on CD-ROM format on the CD itself.

All tracks that are included on both the Japanese and the Israeli editions are identical, but differ from the European editions. The track listing is not the same. The remixes of "This Is the Night" and "Glamorous" were made by Offer Nissim together with Dana International.

"La vita e bella" on the Japanese release, "la vita e bella" is by the Sleaze Sisters. Both the radio edit and the remix

The original version of "Women in Love" is only available on the Israeli edition of "Free"

== Track listing ==
All tracks sung in English unless otherwise noted

European edition, 1999

1. "Dror Yikra" (Hebrew; "Freedom Will Come") (1999 Re-Recording) - 4:03
2. "Free" (Single Version) - 2:56
3. "Love Is All There Is" - 3:54
4. "Language of Love" - 3:36
5. "La Vita È Bella"(Italian title, "Life Is Beautiful", English lyrics) - 4:02
6. "Tease Me" - 3:52
7. "If You Don't Love Me The Way I Am" - 2:52
8. "This Is The Night" - 4:41
9. "Ani Ohevet" (Hebrew; "I Love It") - 4:00
10. "Glamorous" - 4:32
11. "Woman in Love" (C&N Single Remix) - 3:36
12. "Diva" (Hebrew/English) (1999 version) - 3:59
13. "Free" (C&N Remix) - 7:50

Japanese edition, 2000

1. "Dror Yikra" (Hebrew; "Freedom Will Come") (1999 Re-Recording) - 4:10
2. "Free" (Single Version) - 2:53
3. "Diva" (Hebrew/English) (2000 remix) - 3:48
4. "Love Is All There Is" (Remix) - 3:52
5. "Language of Love" - 3:36
6. "La Vita È Bella" (Italian title, "Life Is Beautiful", English lyrics) ( Sleaze Sisters radio edit)
7. 3:52
8. "If You Don't Love Me The Way I Am" (Remix) - 3:52
9. "This Is The Night" (Remix) - 3:51
10. "Ani Ohevet" (Hebrew; "I Love It") (Radio Edit) - 3:32
11. "Glamorous" (Remix) - 3:38
12. "Woman in Love" (C&N Single Remix) - 3:36
13. "Diva '99" (Hebrew/English) (1999 remix) - 4:02
14. La Vita È Bella" (Italian title, "Life Is Beautiful", English lyrics) (Sleaze Sisters

Israeli edition, 2000

1. "Dror Yikra" (Hebrew; "Freedom Will Come") (1999 Re-Recording) - 4:00
2. "Free" (Single Version) - 2:53
3. "Mokher HaPrakhim" (Hebrew; "The Flower Vendor") (with Alon Olearchik - Radio Version) - 3:50
4. "Love Is All There Is" (Remix) - 3:52
5. "'Ad Sof HaZman" (Hebrew; "Until The End of Time") (Radio Version) - 3:49
6. "La Vita È Bella" (Italian title, "Life Is Beautiful", English lyrics) (Sleaze Sisters Short Remix) - 3:28
7. "Glamorous" (Remix) - 3:38
8. "Ani Ohevet" (Hebrew; "I Love It") (Radio Edit) - 3:32
9. "This Is The Night" (Remix) - 3:51
10. "If You Don't Love Me The Way I Am" (Remix) - 3:52
11. "Woman in Love" (Original Mix) - 3:58
12. "Free" (Matin's Anthem Mix) - 6:40
13. "Diva" (Hebrew/English) (C&N Project Mix (2000 Remix)) - 7:10
14. "Woman in Love" (C&N Single Remix) - 3:24
15. CD-ROM track; "Woman In Love" (Video)

== Charts ==
The single "Woman in Love" peaked 40 in Belgium

Chart	Peak position
Belgian (Wallonia) Singles Chart	40
