= Hakol Ze Letova =

Hakol Ze Letova הכל זה לטובה

Studio album by Dana International
- Released: 15 August 2007 (Israel)
- Recorded: 2007
- Genre: Dance; pop; electronica
- Length: 60:12
- Label: Hed Arzi Music

Dana International chronology
HaHalom HaEfshari (2002)	Hakol Ze Letova הכל זה לטובה (2007)

Hakol Ze Letova (Hebrew: הכל זה לטובה, It Is All for the Best) is the eighth studio album by Israeli singer Dana International, released on 15 August 2007 by Hed Arzi label with the catalogue number 64726.

== Album information ==
Hakol Ze Letova was Dana International's first full-length album in five years.

Dana came back in March 2007 with her new single release, "Hakol Ze Letova." She signed with the Hed Artzi label, her official website was given a full makeover, and stunning new promotional photos of Dana appeared in magazines and newspapers. Along with performing "Hakol Ze Letova" on Israel's Rokdím im Kokhavím (Dancing With the Stars), Dana performed live at several events. "Hakol Ze Letova" received admirable airplay, but the next single, "Love Boy", was a smash summer hit. Released in June, "Love Boy" quickly reached the top of the charts and a music video was released soon after. Dana appeared on The Yair Lapid Show, the number one talk show in Israel, in June to chat and perform. She also performed at Israel's Pride Party the same month. In August, it was announced that "Love Boy" had broken an Israeli radio record.

The album includes five single releases, the title track "Hakol Ze Letova", "Love Boy", "At Muhana", "Seret Hodi", a duet featuring Idan Yaniv and "Yom Huledet". The album adds two remixes as bonus tracks as well as two videos, one for the biggest hit "Love Boy" and the other for the French language non-album single "Lola".

Hakol Ze Letova was Dana International's first release for the record company Hed Arzi, incidentally the same label as one of her greatest childhood idols, the late Ofra Haza.

== Track listing ==
Note: the English translations of the song titles do not appear on the album cover and are given here for informational purposes only.

#	Title	Transcription	Translation	Time
1.	הכל זה לטובה	"Hakol Ze LeT'ova"	It Is All For The Best	3:51
2.	יום הולדת	"Yom Huledet"	Birthday	3:55
3.	בראשית	"Bereshit"	In The Beginning	3:42
4.	לא מאמינה	"Lo Maamina"	I Don't Believe	3:18
5.	יאללה בלאגן	"Yalla Balagan"	Come Mess	3:45
6.	סרט הודי (featuring Idan Yaniv)	"Seret' Hodi" (featuring Idan Yaniv)	Indian Movie	3:19
7.	Love Boy	"Love Boy"		3:32
8.	את מוכנה	"At Mukhana"	You Are Ready	4:10
9.	איפה הלב	"Eifo Halev?"	Where Is The Heart?	4:26
10.	אתה ממגנט אותי	"Ata Memagnet Oti"	You Are Magnetizing Me	3:09
11.	יום אחר	"Yom Akher"	Other Day	4:06
12.	חורבות האהבה	"Khoravot HaAhava"	Ruins Of Love	4:24
Bonus tracks
13.	הכל זה לטובה (Ziv Goland & Dani Tuval Remix)	"It Is All For The Best (Ziv Goland & Dani Tuval Remix)"	It's All For The Best (Ziv Goland & Dani Tuval Remix)	7:35
14.	Love Boy (Eli Abramov & Ziv Goland Remix)	" Love Boy (Eli Abramov & Ziv Goland Remix)"	Love Boy(Eli Abramov & Ziv Goland Remix)	7:00
Bonus video
15.	Lola	"Lola"		7:35
16.	Love Boy	"Love Boy"		3:23
