= List of LGBTQ participants in the Eurovision Song Contest =

The following list includes those participants in the Eurovision Song Contest who are known to be members of the LGBTQ community.

== Artists ==
As of the 2025 contest, LGBTQ participants have won 12 times, including six out of the last eight contests held.

Table key:	First place	Second place	Third place

Artist	Country	Year	Song	Sexual orientation or gender identity	Points	Place
Dany Dauberson	France	1956	"Il est là"	Lesbian	—N/a (Note: The 1956 contest had secret voting and, apart from the winner, no results were released.)	
Bob Benny	Belgium	1959	"Hou toch van mij"	Gay (Note: Came out subsequent to the Eurovision performance)	9	6
Bob Benny	Belgium	1961	"September, gouden roos"	Gay	1	15
Jean-Claude Pascal	Luxembourg	1961	"Nous les amoureux"	Gay (Note: Never publicly came out during his lifetime)	31	1
Kathy Kirby	United Kingdom	1965	"I Belong"	Was in a same-sex relationship after the contest	26	2
Ronnie Tober	Netherlands	1968	"Morgen"	Gay	1	16
Patrick Juvet	Switzerland	1973	"Je vais me marier, Marie"	Bisexual	79	12
Jürgen Marcus	Luxembourg	1976	"Chansons pour ceux qui s'aiment"	Gay	17	14
Jean-Claude Pascal	Luxembourg	1981	"C'est peut-être pas l'Amérique"	Gay	41	11
Gerard Joling	Netherlands	1988	"Shangri-La"	Gay	70	9
Sigga Beinteins (Note: Performed as part of the duo Stjórnin)	Iceland	1990	"Eitt lag enn"	Lesbian	124	4
Sigga Beinteins (Note: Performed as part of the band Heart 2 Heart)	Iceland	1992	"Nei eða já"	Lesbian	80	7
Dina	Portugal	1992	"Amor d'água fresca"	Lesbian	26	17
Christer Björkman	Sweden	1992	"I morgon är en annan dag"	Gay	9	22
Sara	Portugal	1994	"Chamar a música"	Bisexual	73	8
Sigga Beinteins	Iceland	1994	"Nætur"	Lesbian	49	12
Paul Oscar	Iceland	1997	"Minn hinsti dans"	Gay	18	20
Gabriel Forss (Note: Performed as part of the band Blond)	Sweden	1997	"Bara hon älskar mig"	Gay	36	14
Katrina Leskanich (Note: Performed as part of the band Katrina and the Waves)	United Kingdom	1997	"Love Shine a Light"	Lesbian	227	1
Dana International	Israel	1998	"Diva"	Trans woman	172	1
Piasek	Poland	2001	"2Long"	Gay	11	20
Kim Kärnfalk (Note: Performed as part of the band Friends)	Sweden	2001	"Listen to Your Heartbeat"	Bisexual	100	5
Sarit Hadad	Israel	2002	"Light a Candle"	Lesbian	37	12
Julia Volkova (Note: Performed as part of the duo t.A.T.u.)	Russia	2003	"Ne ver', ne boysia"	Bisexual	164	3
Deen	Bosnia and Herzegovina	2004	"In the Disco"	Bisexual	91	9
Tomas Thordarson	Denmark	2004	"Shame on You"	Gay	Failed to qualify	
Jari Sillanpää	Finland	2004	"Takes 2 to Tango"	Gay	Failed to qualify	
Jonatan Cerrada	France	2004	"À chaque pas"	Gay	40	15
Knut Anders Sørum	Norway	2004	"High"	Bisexual	3	24
Donna McCaul (Note: Performed as part of the duo Donna and Joe)	Ireland	2005	"Love?"	Lesbian	Failed to qualify	
Brian Kennedy	Ireland	2006	"Every Song Is a Cry for Love"	Gay	93	10
Andreas Lundstedt (Note: Performed as part of the group six4one)	Switzerland	2006	"If We All Give a Little"	Gay	30	16
Marija Šerifović	Serbia	2007	"Molitva" (Молитва)	Lesbian	268	1
Olga Seryabkina and Elena Temnikova (Note: Performed as part of the band Serebro)	Russia	2007	"Song #1"	Bisexuals	207	3
Javi Soleil (Note: Performed as part of the band D'Nash)	Spain	2007	"I Love You Mi Vida"	Gay	43	20
Ola Salo (Note: Performed as part of the band The Ark)	Sweden	2007	"The Worrying Kind"	Bisexual	51	18
David Ducasse (Note: Performed as part of the band Scooch)	United Kingdom	2007	"Flying the Flag (For You)"	Gay	19	22
Lucy Diakovska (Note: Performed as part of the band No Angels)	Germany	2008	"Disappear"	Lesbian	14	23
Friðrik Ómar (Note: Performed as part of the band Eurobandið)	Iceland	2008	"This is My Life"	Gay	64	14
Oscar Loya (Note: Performed as part of the duo Alex Swings Oscar Sings!)	Germany	2009	"Miss Kiss Kiss Bang"	Gay	35	20
Gordon Heuckeroth (Note: Performed as part of the band De Toppers)	Netherlands	2009	"Shine"	Gay	Failed to qualify	
Harel Skaat	Israel	2010	"Milim" (מילים)	Gay	71	14
Michael von der Heide	Switzerland	2010	"Il pleut de l'or"	Gay	Failed to qualify	
Dana International	Israel	2011	"Ding Dong"	Trans woman	Failed to qualify	
Glen Vella	Malta	2011	"One Life"	Gay	Failed to qualify	
Duncan James and Lee Ryan (Note: Performed as part of the band Blue)	United Kingdom	2011	"I Can"	Gay (James); Bisexual (Ryan)	100	11
Tooji	Norway	2012	"Stay"	Gay	7	26
Loreen	Sweden	2012	"Euphoria"	Bisexual	372	1
Ryan Dolan	Ireland	2013	"Only Love Survives"	Gay	5	26
Conchita Wurst	Austria	2014	"Rise Like a Phoenix"	Gay (Note: Thomas Neuwirth, the person behind the drag persona Conchita Wurst, is openly gay)	290	1
Axel Hirsoux	Belgium	2014	"Mother"	Gay	Failed to qualify	
Amber	Malta	2015	"Warrior"	Lesbian	Failed to qualify	
Deen (Note: Performed with Dalal and feat. Ana Rucner and Jala)	Bosnia and Herzegovina	2016	"Ljubav je"	Bisexual	Failed to qualify	
Nina Kraljić	Croatia	2016	"Lighthouse"	Bisexual	73	23
Johannes Nymark (Note: Performed as part of the band Lighthouse X)	Denmark	2016	"Soldiers of Love"	Gay	Failed to qualify	
Jamie-Lee	Germany	2016	"Ghost"	Non-binary gender	11	26
Hovi Star	Israel	2016	"Made of Stars"	Gay	135	14
Douwe Bob	Netherlands	2016	"Slow Down"	Bisexual	153	11
Michal Szpak	Poland	2016	"Color of Your Life"	Pansexual	229	8
Rykka	Switzerland	2016	"The Last of Our Kind"	Non-binary gender	Failed to qualify	
Imri Ziv	Israel	2017	"I Feel Alive"	Gay	39	23
Slavko Kalezić	Montenegro	2017	"Space"	Gay	Failed to qualify	
Salvador Sobral	Portugal	2017	"Amar pelos dois"	Intersex	758	1
Johnny Manuel (Note: Performed as part of the group Equinox)	Bulgaria	2018	"Bones"	Gay	166	14
Saara Aalto	Finland	2018	"Monsters"	Lesbian	46	25
Isaura (Note: Performed uncredited vocals for Cláudia Pascoal)	Portugal	2018	"O jardim"	Lesbian	39	26
Mélovin	Ukraine	2018	"Under the Ladder"	Bisexual	130	17
Bilal Hassani	France	2019	"Roi"	Queer	105	16
Duncan Laurence	Netherlands	2019	"Arcade"	Bisexual	498	1
Tom Hugo (Note: Performed as part of the group Keiino)	Norway	2019	"Spirit in the Sky"	Gay	331	6
Montaigne	Australia	2021	"Technicolour"	Bisexual (Note: Open during the contest) and non-binary gender	Failed to qualify	
Jendrik	Germany	2021	"I Don't Feel Hate"	Gay	3	25
Lesley Roy	Ireland	2021	"Maps"	Lesbian	Failed to qualify	
Victoria De Angelis and Ethan Torchio (Note: Performed as part of the band Måneskin)	Italy	2021	"Zitti e buoni"	Lesbian (De Angelis) "Sexually free" (Torchio)	524	1
Jeangu Macrooy	Netherlands	2021	"Birth of a New Age"	Gay	11	23
Vasil	North Macedonia	2021	"Here I Stand"	Gay	Failed to qualify	
Roxen	Romania	2021	"Amnesia"	Non-binary gender	Failed to qualify	
Blas Cantó	Spain	2021	"Voy a quedarme"	Bisexual	6	24
Tusse	Sweden	2021	"Voices"	Queer	109	14
Sheldon Riley	Australia	2022	"Not the Same"	Gay	125	15
Elín Eyþórsdóttir (Note: Performed as part of the group Systur)	Iceland	2022	"Með hækkandi sól"	Lesbian	20	23
Michael Ben David	Israel	2022	"I.M"	Gay	Failed to qualify	
Andrei Ursu (Note: Performed under the stage name Wrs)	Romania	2022	"Llámame"	Bisexual	65	18
Chanel	Spain	2022	"SloMo"	Queer	459	3
Gustaph	Belgium	2023	"Because of You"	Gay	182	7
Alessandra Mele	Norway	2023	"Queen of Kings"	Bisexual	268	5
Luke Black	Serbia	2023	"Samo mi se spava" (Само ми се спава)	Gay	30	24
Loreen	Sweden	2023	"Tattoo"	Bisexual	583	1
Zaachariaha Fielding and Michael Ross (Note: Performed as part of the band Electric Fields)	Australia	2024	"One Milkali (One Blood)"	Gay	Failed to qualify	
Mustii	Belgium	2024	"Before the Party's Over"	Queer	Failed to qualify	
Aiko	Czech Republic	2024	"Pedestal"	Bisexual	Failed to qualify	
Saba	Denmark	2024	"Sand"	Lesbian	Failed to qualify	
Bambie Thug	Ireland	2024	"Doomsday Blue"	Non-binary gender	278	6
Angelina Mango	Italy	2024	"La noia"	Queer	268	7
Silvester Belt	Lithuania	2024	"Luktelk"	Bisexual	90	14
Iolanda	Portugal	2024	"Grito"	Lesbian	152	10
Kenzy Loevett and Kat Almagro (Note: Performed as part of the band Megara)	San Marino	2024	"11:11"	Lesbian	Failed to qualify	
Nemo	Switzerland	2024	"The Code"	Non-binary gender and pansexual	591	1
Olly Alexander	United Kingdom	2024	"Dizzy"	Gay and non-binary gender	46	18
JJ	Austria	2025	"Wasted Love"	Queer	436	1
Red Sebastian	Belgium	2025	"Strobe Lights"	Queer	Failed to qualify	
Marko Bošnjak	Croatia	2025	"Poison Cake"	Gay	Failed to qualify	
Adonxs	Czech Republic	2025	"Kiss Kiss Goodbye"	Queer	Failed to qualify	
Erika Vikman	Finland	2025	"Ich komme"	Bisexual	196	11
Miriana Conte	Malta	2025	"Serving"	Queer	91	17
Kyle Alessandro	Norway	2025	"Lighter"	Queer	89	18
Søren Torpegaard Lund	Denmark	2026	"Før vi går hjem"	Gay	243	7
Akylas	Greece	2026	"Ferto"	Queer	220	10
Lion Ceccah	Lithuania	2026	"Sólo quiero más"	Queer	22	22
Boy George (Note: Performed as uncredited backup vocal for Senhit)	San Marino	2026	"Superstar"	Gay	Failed to qualify	
George Perris	Cyprus	2027	TBD	Gay	TBD	TBD

=== Artists with multiple appearances ===
Six of the LGBT artists listed above have competed in the Eurovision Song Contest at least twice:

- Belgium: Bob Benny, 1959 and 1961
- Luxembourg: Jean-Claude Pascal, 1961 and 1981 (won the first time)
- Iceland: Sigga Beinteins, 1990, 1992 and 1994
- Israel: Dana International, 1998 and 2011 (won the first time)
- Bosnia and Herzegovina: Deen, 2004 and 2016
- Sweden: Loreen, 2012 and 2023 (won both times)

=== Summaries ===
As of the 2026 contest:

- Of the 50 countries that have competed in the contest, (Note: Excluding Yugoslavia and Serbia and Montenegro, countries that no longer exist and were not represented by LGBT artists during their existence) 34 have been represented by LGBT artists at least once, 29 of which have been represented by LGBT artists more than once.
  - Of the 16 countries that have competed in the contest but have never been represented by LGBT artists, five have not been active for over a decade (Andorra, Monaco, Morocco, Slovakia, and Turkey). A sixth country, Belarus, is currently ineligible to participate.
  - Of the 29 countries that have been represented by LGBT artists more than once, Bosnia and Herzegovina is the only country that was represented by only a single LGBTQ artist, who represented the country more than once.

LGBT participation by country
Country	Number of years represented by LGBT artists	Years represented by LGBT artists	Number of unique LGBT artists representing the country
Australia	3	2021, 2022, 2024	4 (two different artists shared in the representation for the country in 2024)
Austria	2	2014, 2025	2
Belgium	6	1959, 1961, 2014, 2023, 2024, 2025	5 (same artist represented Belgium in 1959 and 1961)
Bosnia and Herzegovina	2	2004, 2016	1 (same artist represented Bosnia and Herzegovina in 2004 and 2016)
Bulgaria	1	2018	1
Croatia	2	2016, 2025	2
Cyprus	1	2027	1
Czech Republic	2	2024, 2025	2
Denmark	4	2004, 2016, 2024, 2026	4
Finland	3	2004, 2018, 2025	3
France	3	1956, 2004, 2019	3
Germany	4	2008, 2009, 2016, 2021	4
Greece	1	2026	1
Iceland	6	1990, 1992, 1994, 1997, 2008, 2022	4 (same artist represented Iceland in 1990, 1992 and 1994)
Ireland	5	2005, 2006, 2013, 2021, 2024	5
Israel	7	1998, 2002, 2010, 2011, 2016, 2017, 2022	6 (same artist represented Israel in 1998 and 2011)
Italy	2	2021, 2024	3 (two different artists shared in the representation for the country in 2021)
Lithuania	2	2024, 2026	2
Luxembourg	3	1961, 1976, 1981	2 (same artist represented Luxembourg in 1961 and 1981)
Malta	3	2011, 2015, 2025	3
Montenegro	1	2017	1
Netherlands	7	1968, 1988, 2001, 2009, 2016, 2019, 2021	7
North Macedonia	1	2021	1
Norway	5	2004, 2012, 2019, 2023, 2025	5
Poland	2	2001, 2016	2
Portugal	5	1992, 1994, 2017, 2018,2024	5
Romania	2	2021, 2022	2
Russia	2	2003, 2007	3 (two different artists shared in the representation for the country in 2007)
San Marino	2	2024, 2026	3 (two different artists shared in the representation for the country in 2024)
Serbia	2	2007, 2023	2
Spain	3	2007, 2021, 2022	3
Sweden	7	1992, 1997, 2001, 2007, 2012, 2021, 2023	6 (same artist represented Sweden in 2012 and 2023)
Switzerland	5	1973, 2006, 2010, 2016, 2024	5
Ukraine	1	2018	1
United Kingdom	5	1965, 1997, 2007, 2011, 2024	6 (two different artists shared in the representation for the country in 2011)

- Of the 70 editions of the contest that have been held, 39 had at least one entry performed by an LGBTQ artist, 24 of which had more than one entry performed by LGBT artists.
  - Every contest held in the 21st century has featured at least one LGBTQ artist.
  - The 2024 contest featured 11 entries with LGBT artists (13 LGBT artists altogether), the most of any edition.

LGBT participation by year
Year	Number of entries with LGBT artists	Countries with LGBT artists
1956	1	France
1959	1	Belgium
1961	2	Belgium, Luxembourg
1965	1	United Kingdom
1968	1	Netherlands
1973	1	Switzerland
1976	1	Luxembourg
1981	1	Luxembourg
1988	1	Netherlands
1990	1	Iceland
1992	3	Iceland, Portugal, Sweden
1994	2	Iceland, Portugal
1997	3	Iceland, Sweden, United Kingdom
1998	1	Israel
2001	3	Netherlands, Poland, Sweden
2002	1	Israel
2003	1	Russia
2004	5	Bosnia and Herzegovina, Denmark, Finland, France, Norway
2005	1	Ireland
2006	2	Ireland, Switzerland
2007	5	Russia, Serbia, Spain, Sweden, United Kingdom
2008	2	Germany, Iceland
2009	2	Germany, Netherlands
2010	2	Israel, Switzerland
2011	3	Israel, Malta, United Kingdom
2012	2	Norway, Sweden
2013	1	Ireland
2014	2	Austria, Belgium
2015	1	Malta
2016	8	Bosnia and Herzegovina, Croatia, Denmark, Germany, Israel, Netherlands, Poland, Switzerland
2017	3	Israel, Montenegro, Portugal
2018	4	Bulgaria, Finland, Portugal, Ukraine
2019	3	France, Netherlands, Norway
2021	9	Australia, Germany, Ireland, Italy, Netherlands, North Macedonia, Romania, Spain, Sweden
2022	5	Australia, Iceland, Israel, Romania, Spain
2023	4	Belgium, Norway, Serbia, Sweden
2024	11	Australia, Belgium, Czech Republic, Denmark, Ireland, Italy, Lithuania, Portugal, San Marino, Switzerland, United Kingdom
2025	7	Austria, Belgium, Croatia, Czech Republic, Finland, Malta, Norway
2026	4	Denmark, Greece, Lithuania, San Marino
2027	1	Cyprus

== Presenters ==
Presenter	Host country	Year	Sexual orientation or gender identity
Yigal Ravid	Israel	1999	Gay
Assi Azar	Israel	2019	Gay
Nikkie de Jager	Netherlands	2021	Trans woman
Mika	Italy	2022	Gay
Graham Norton (Note: Has also served as the UK's television commentator for the contest since 2009)	United Kingdom	2023 (final only)	Gay

== See also ==
- LGBTQ visibility in the Eurovision Song Contest
- Drag performances in the Eurovision Song Contest:
  - Norway in the Eurovision Song Contest 1986 (Note: Performance featured dancers in drag)
  - Slovenia in the Eurovision Song Contest 2002
  - Denmark in the Eurovision Song Contest 2007
  - Ukraine in the Eurovision Song Contest 2007
  - Austria in the Eurovision Song Contest 2014 (Note: Listed in this article since the performer is also LGBT)
  - Australia in the Eurovision Song Contest 2024
  - Spain in the Eurovision Song Contest 2024
