= Umpatampa =

Umpatampa אומפטמפה

Studio album by Dana International
- Released: 1994
- Recorded: 1994
- Genre: Dance; techno; house; electronica
- Label: IMP Dance; IMP 2012-2

Dana International chronology
Danna International (1993)	Umpatampa אומפטמפה (1994)	E.P. Tampa (1995)

Umpatampa is the second studio album by Israeli singer Dana International, released on the IMP Dance label in 1994 with the catalogue number, IMP 2012-2. There are four slightly different editions of this album, all with the same catalogue number:

- The first edition of the album contained only 12 tracks as it was released before "Layla Tov, Eropa" ("Good Evening, Europe") was recorded.
- The second edition does not include "Layla Tov, Eropa" in the track listing - but a yellow sticker in Hebrew on the cover misguidedly claims that it does.
- Two 13 track re-releases do include "Layla Tov, Eropa", the only difference being that one cover has a yellow horizontal line through Dana's hair on the front cover.

The Umpatampa album includes songs sung in four languages; Hebrew, Arabic, English and French.

== Track listing ==
Note: The Hebrew language title appear in Hebrew script only along with the time length. Additional details such as English translations of the song titles are given here for informational purposes on each track only.

1. "Layla T'ov, Eiropa" (Hebrew; "Good Night, Europe") (Original Version) - 3:00
2. "Petrance" (Hebrew) - 3:49
3. "Ani Lo Yekhola Bil'adeikha" (Hebrew; "I Can't Live Without You") (Radio Edit) - 4:14
4. "Yeshnan Banot" (Hebrew; "Some Girls") (Radio Edit) - 2:33
5. "Umpatampa" (English) - 3:49
6. "Qu'Est-Ce Que C'est?" (French; "What Is It?") - 4:16
7. "Right Now" (English) - 4:37
8. "Mea Akhuz Gever" (Hebrew; "One Hundred Percent Man") - 3:21
9. "Betula" (Hebrew; "Virgin") (Radio Edit) - 3:10
10. "Zomba" (Arabic) - 4:02
11. "Dror Yikra" (Hebrew; "Freedom Will Come") - 3:28
12. "Nosa'at LePet'ra" (Hebrew; "Going to Petra") - 3:39
13. "Ani Lo Yekhola Bil'adeikha" (Hebrew; "I Can't Live Without You") (Power Dance Version) - 3:31
