= HaHalom HaEfshari =

HaHalom HaEfshari החלום האפשרי

Studio album by Dana International
- Released: November 14, 2002
- Recorded: 2002
- Genre: Dance; pop
- Label: IMP Records; IMP 2104

Dana International chronology
Yoter VeYoter (2001)	HaHalom HaEfshari החלום האפשרי (2002)	Hakol Ze Letova (2007)

HaHalom HaEfshari (Hebrew: החלום האפשרי, lit. The Possible Dream) is the seventh studio album by the Israeli singer Dana International. It was released in 2002 on the IMP Records label with the catalogue number IMP 2104.

The Possible Dream features two English-language songs, "Gotta Move On" and "Superman", along with the Israeli single releases "'Ad HaYom" ("To This Day"), the title track "HaHalom HaEfshari" ("The Possible Dream"), "Makát Chom ('Ey La Dir La Da Da)" ("Heatstroke"), a cover of a classic 1970s hit single by legendary Italian/Egyptian/French entertainer Dalida then titled "Darladirladada", "Sipur Katzar", "Tachlom" ("Dream On"), "Tagíd Li Mi" ("Tell Me Who"), a cover version of "Storie di tutti i giorni" by the Italian singer Riccardo Fogli, and "Yihye Tov" ("I'll Be Fine"). Some of the tracks were only issued as promotional singles. The album was released in two versions: a standard jewel case and a card sleeve. Both formats feature identical track lists.

In 2003, a limited edition 8-CD box set, The CDs Collection, was released, with only 2,000 copies being made. The 18 track box set included seven of the Possible Dream singles, some previously never commercially available, with the eighth disc being the non-album release "AloRaroLa".

In promotion of the album's release, Dana made her debut performance in the United States in New York City.

== Track listing ==
Note: The English translations of the song titles are given here for informational purposes only.

1. "'Ad Hayom" ("To This Day [Until Today]") - 4:06
2. "Takhlom" ("Dream On") (Radio Edit) - 3:43
3. "Tagid Li Mi" ("Tell Me Who") - 3:29
4. "Makat Khom" ("'Ey La Dir La Da Da") ("Heatstroke") - 2:59
5. "HaKhalom HaEfshari" ("The Possible Dream") - 3:20
6. "Yihye T'ov" ("I'll Be Fine") - 3:30
7. "Raq Lo Hayom" ("But Not Today") - 3:38
8. "Gotta Move On" - 3:45
9. "Superman" - 4:12
10. "Sipur Qatzar" (Short Story)- 3:51
11. "Nitzakhti" ("I Won") (Acoustic Version) - 3:07
12. "Yihye T'ov" ("I'll Be Fine") (S.T.E.R.N. Remix) - 6:09
13. "Takhlom" ("Dream On") (Zigo Remix) - 6:31
