= Yoter VeYoter =

Yoter VeYoter יותר ויותר

Studio album by Dana International
- Released: September 2, 2001
- Recorded: 2001
- Genres: Pop; dance; EDM
- Labels: NMC Music; NMC 20569 2

Dana International chronology
Free (1999)	Yoter VeYoter יותר ויותר (2001)	HaHalom HaEfshari (2002)

Yoter Ve Yoter (Hebrew: יותר ויותר, More and More) is the sixth studio album by Israeli singer Dana International, released in 2001 on the NMC Music label with the catalogue number NMC 20569 2.

More and More was Dana International's first album entirely sung in Hebrew and includes the single releases "elef Yamím Shel Ahava" (Qesher)" ("A Thousand Days of Love (Connection)"), "Lama Katavta Li Shir" ("Why Did You Write Me A Song"), "Nitzachti" ("I Won"), "Ten Likhhyot" ("Let Live") and "VeAkharey Hakol" ("And After All"). The album was released in a regular jewel case but also as a limited edition which came in a 7" cardboard box. The track list on both editions is identical.

== Track listing ==
Note: All titles sung in Hebrew. The English translations of the song titles are given here for informational purposes only.

1. "Nitzakhti" ("I Won") - 3:32
2. "Ten Likhyot" ("Let Live") 4:03
3. "Elef Yamím Shel Ahava" (Qesher)" ("A Thousand Days of Love (Connection)") - 3:41
4. "Yoter VeYoter" ("More and More") - 4:29
5. "Laqúm BaBóqer ("To Get Up in the Morning") - 3:24
6. "Ata Hores" ("You Are a Heartbreaker") - 4:07
7. "Ata Ha-DJ Shelí" ("You're My DJ") - 4:03
8. "Hargasha T'ova" (A Good Feeling") - 4:36
9. "Lama Katavta Li Shir" ("Why Did You Write Me A Song") - 4:49
10. "BaDerekh El HaKhófesh" ("On The Road To Freedom") - 4:46
11. "Hakol Yihye Varód" ("Everything Will Be Pink") - 4:10
12. "VeAkharey Hakol" ("And After All") (Radio Version) - 4:35
13. "'Ad Sof HaZman" ("Till The End of Time") (New Version) - 4:24
