= LGBTQ visibility in the Eurovision Song Contest =

The Eurovision Song Contest has had a long-held fan base in the LGBTQ community, and the contest organisers have actively worked to include these fans since the 1990s.

== LGBTQ participants ==
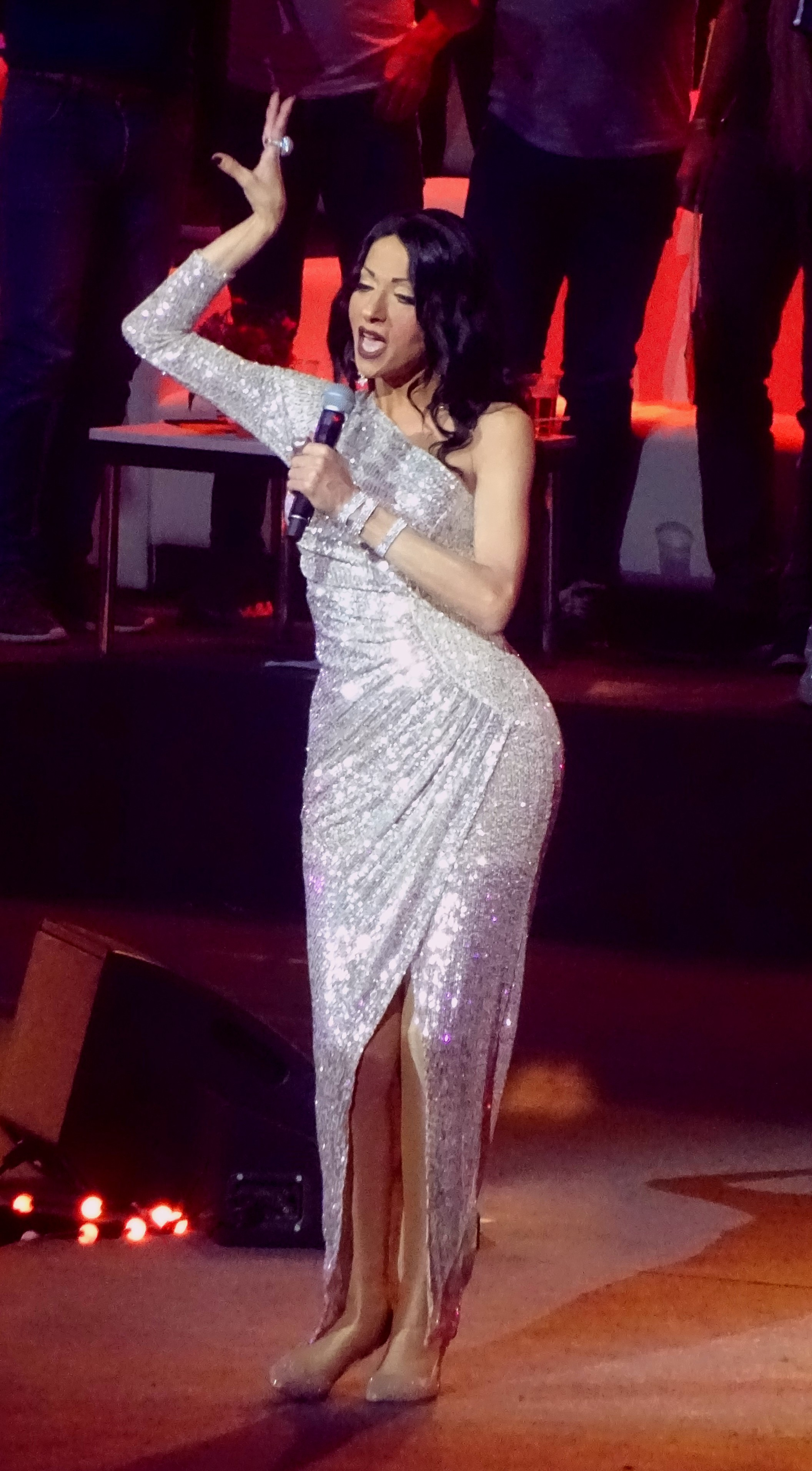
Dana International, the contest's first trans participant, and winner for Israel in 1998

Paul Oscar became the contest's first openly gay artist when he represented Iceland in 1997. Katrina Leskanich, who won representing the United Kingdom in 1997 as lead singer of the group Katrina and the Waves later came out. Dana International, representing Israel in 1998, was the contest's first trans performer, and became the first trans artist to win the contest. Several open members of the LGBTQ community have since gone on to compete and win the contest: Conchita Wurst, the drag persona of openly gay Thomas Neuwirth, won for Austria in 2014; and openly bisexual performer Duncan Laurence was the winner for the Netherlands in 2019. Marija Šerifović, who won for Serbia in 2007, subsequently came out publicly as a lesbian in 2013. Loreen, who won for Sweden in 2012 and 2023, came out as bisexual in 2017. Victoria De Angelis, a member of Måneskin, the band who won for Italy in 2021, is openly bisexual, with fellow band member Ethan Torchio defining himself as "sexually free". Nemo, who won for Switzerland in 2024, is the first openly non-binary artist to win the contest.

As attitudes have changed across Europe, and same-sex attraction has become more accepted in many European countries, several artists have since come out as LGBTQ years or decades after participating in the contest. These include Bob Benny, who represented Belgium in 1959 and 1961 and came out publicly as gay in 2001, and Patrick Juvet, who represented Switzerland in 1973, who came out publicly as bisexual in 2005.

Several presenters of the Eurovision Song Contest have also identified as LGBTQ, including Yigal Ravid and Assi Azar, who hosted in Israel in 1999 and 2019 respectively, and Nikkie de Jager, who hosted in the Netherlands in 2021. De Jager was the first transgender person to host the contest. Mika, who is gay, hosted the 2022 edition in Italy. Graham Norton, who is also gay, hosted the final of the 2023 edition in the United Kingdom and has additionally served as the BBC's television commentator for the contest since 2009.

== LGBTQ themes in competing acts ==
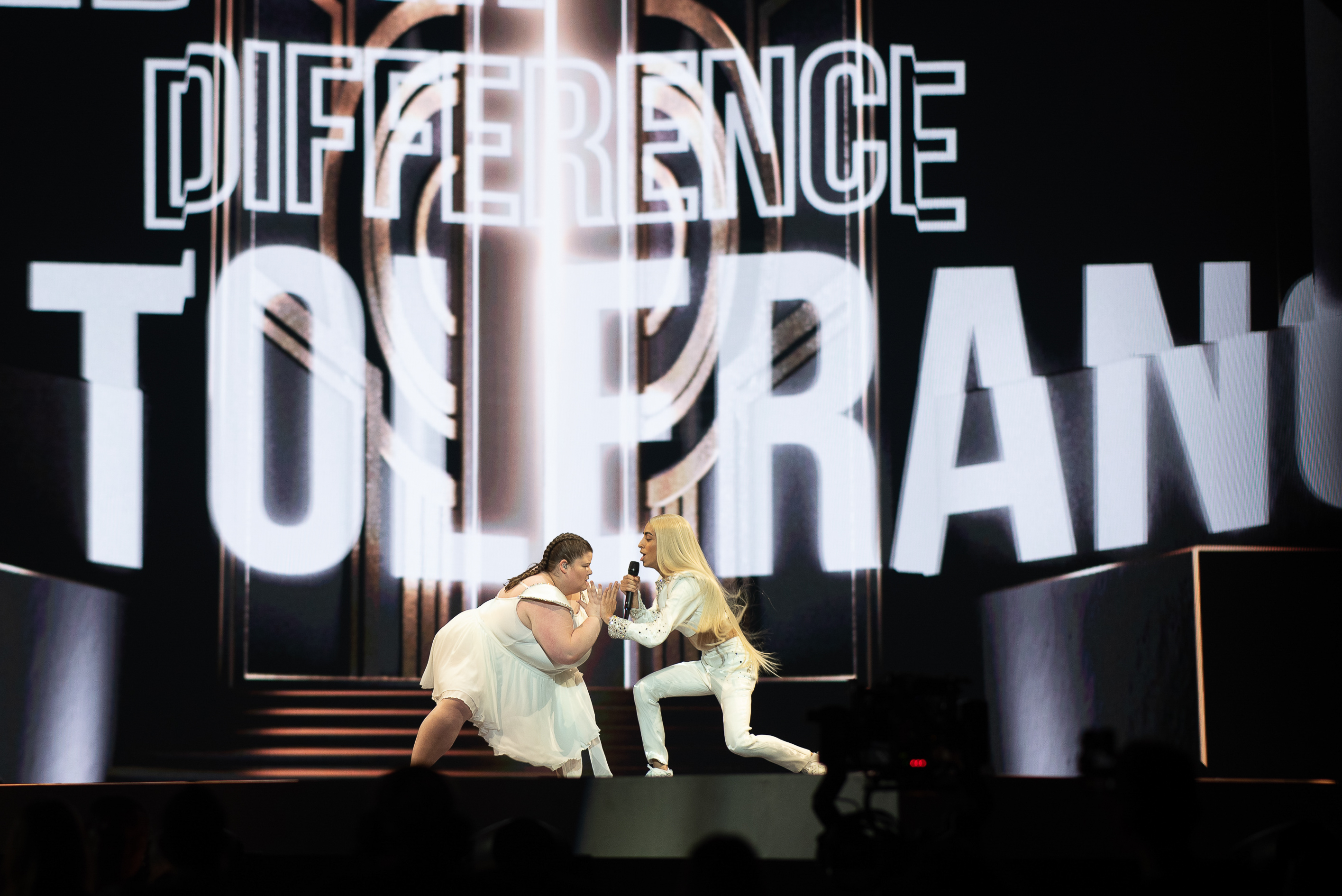
Bilal Hassani, who identifies as queer, represented France in 2019

Past competing songs and performances have included references and allusions to same-sex relationships. One of the contest's earliest winning songs, "Nous les amoureux" for Luxembourg in 1961, was later confirmed by its performer Jean-Claude Pascal as containing references to a homosexual relationship and the difficulties faced by the pair, considered controversial during the early 1960s when in many European countries homosexual relations were still criminalised. Pascal notes, however, that the song's lyrics were deliberately made ambiguous to avoid the mention of the gender of either of the lovers since homosexuality was taboo at the time. The gay rights message of the song was therefore obscured. Pascal also stated that because of its ambiguity, it was not understood as a gay song by the general public at the time. In addition, Pascal was himself gay.

Krista Siegfrids' performance of "Marry Me" for Finland in 2013 featured a same-sex kiss with one of her female backing dancers at the end. The stage performance of "Together" by Ryan O'Shaughnessy for Ireland in 2018 featured two male dancers portraying a same-sex relationship. The performance of "This Time" by Monika Linkytė and Vaidas Baumila for Lithuania in 2015 featured a kiss between two men and two women in the background. Achille Lauro, the entrant for San Marino in 2022, engaged in a same-sex kiss with guitarist, producer and long-time collaborator Boss Doms. The performance of "Because of You" by Gustaph for Belgium in 2023 featured vogue dancer PussCee West.

Several drag acts have featured in Eurovision performances, including Conchita Wurst for Austria in 2014, Verka Serduchka for Ukraine in 2007, DQ for Denmark in 2007, Sestre for Slovenia in 2002; the latter's selection sparked protests and debate on LGBTQ rights in Slovenia at the time and resulted in concerns raised at the European Parliament ahead of Slovenia's upcoming accession to the European Union.

== Criticism of LGBTQ visibility ==
Dana International's selection for the 1998 contest was marked by objections and death threats from Orthodox religious sections of Israeli society, and at the contest her accommodation was reportedly in the only hotel in Birmingham with bulletproof windows.

In more recent years, various political ideologies across Europe have clashed in the Eurovision setting, particularly on LGBTQ rights. Türkiye Radyo ve Televizyon Kurumu (TRT) from Turkey, once a regular participant in the contest and a one-time winner, first pulled out of the contest in 2013, citing dissatisfaction in the voting rules; more recently when asked about returning to the contest it has cited LGBTQ performances as another reason for their continued boycott. After initially planning on airing the 2013 contest, TRT eventually pulled its broadcast of the event in response to Krista Siegfrids's same-sex kiss. It has also been reported that LGBTQ visibility in the contest was also a deciding factor when Médiaszolgáltatás-támogató és Vagyonkezelő Alap (MTVA) from Hungary chose not to enter the 2020 contest amid a rise in anti-LGBTQ sentiment in the Hungarian government of Viktor Orbán, although no official reason has been given by the broadcaster.

Following the introduction of a "gay propaganda" law in Russia in 2013, as well as developments in Ukraine, the 2014 contest saw a marked increase in booing from the audience, particularly during the Russian performance, getting qualified to the final, and during the voting when Russia received points. Conchita Wurst's win in the contest was also met with criticism on the Russian political stage, with several conservative politicians voicing displeasure in the result. In response to the booing, the producers of the 2015 contest installed "anti-booing technology" for the broadcast, and the contest's presenters repeatedly called on the audience not to boo; the Russian participant, Polina Gagarina, was interviewed by Conchita in the green room during a break in the voting, and attracted criticism from Russian conservatives when she posted a backstage video to social media of herself hugging Conchita.

Clashes on LGBTQ visibility in the contest have also occurred in countries which do not compete in the contest. Eurovision had been broadcast in China for several years, however in 2018, the rights held by Mango TV were terminated during the 2018 contest. The live broadcast of the first semi-final featured censorship by Mango TV of Ireland's Ryan O'Shaughnessy, as well as audience members displaying pride flags during the performance by Switzerland's Zibbz; these performances reportedly went against Chinese guidelines that prohibit "abnormal sexual relationships and behaviours" due to the same-sex dancing. Albania's Eugent Bushpepa was also censored due to the open display of tattoos, which broke guidelines around the featuring of "sub-cultures" and "dispirited cultures". As a result of the termination, the Chinese broadcaster was unable to broadcast the second semi-final or the final of the 2018 contest or any future contests.
