= Maganuna =

Studio album by Dana International
- Released: 1996
- Recorded: 1996
- Genre: Dance; techno; house
- Length: 52:13
- Label: Helicon/Big Foot; HL 8143

Dana International chronology
| E.P. Tampa (1995) | Maganuna (1996) | Diva – The Hits (1998) |

Maganona, or "Majnoona" (a broken pronunciation for the Egyptian Arabic word: مجنونة magnūna [mæɡˈnuːnæ], "crazy") is the third studio album to by Israeli singer Dana International, released in 1996 on the Helicon/Big Foot label, with the catalog number HL 8143. There are three editions of the Maganona album:

- The first edition has a special cross-formed poster containing the lyrics booklet. It also lists the title "Cinquemila" as lasting 3:14, but the version included on all CDs is 4:04 long.
- Later pressings have a more regular cover booklet.
- The third edition is an Israeli budget edition with "Cherry Series" printed on the cover on the inside of the jewel case.

All three editions of the album have identical track listings. The Maganona album includes songs sung in four languages; Hebrew, Arabic, English and Italian.

== Track listing ==
Note: Only the titles in their own language script and the time lengths appear on the actual cover, with the exception of the last three tracks which have "Instrumental" and "Club Mix" listed in Latin script. Additional details such as the language in which the songs are sung and the English translations of the song titles are given here for informational purposes only.

1. "Maganuna" (Arabic; "Crazy") (radio edit) – 3:45
2. "Let Kiss" (Hebrew) – 3:16
3. "Don Quixote" (Hebrew) – 4:05)
4. "Yesh Bo Esh" (Hebrew; "He's Got Fire") (with Igi Wachsman) – 4:16
5. "I'm Gonna Let" (English) – 5:21
6. "Cinquemila" (Italian/English; "Five Thousand") (album version) – 4:04
7. "Menafnefet" (Hebrew; "Waving") (radio edit) – 4:15
8. "Ot MiShamayim" (Hebrew; "A Sign From Heaven") – 3:27
9. "Sipur Ahavatam Shel Khas VeKhalila" (Hebrew; "The Love Story of Oh and My God") – 3:14
10. "Bo" (Hebrew; "Come") – 3:39
11. "Sipur Ahavatam Shel Khas VeKhalila" ("The Love Story of Oh and My God") (instrumental) – 2:42
12. "Menafnefet" (Hebrew; "Waving") (club mix) – 5:16
13. "Maganuna" (Arabic; "Crazy") (club mix) – 5:43
