= Loca (Dana International song) =

Single by Dana International
- Released: 2013
- Genre: pop
- Length: 3:05
- Songwriter(s): Dana International

"Loca" is the title of a pop song written and performed by Israeli singer Dana International. It is the second single from the album Ma La'asot.

The clip of "Loca" promoted the Gay Pride of Tel Aviv in 2013. It was presented at the main event for the Tel Aviv Gay Pride on June 7.

== Lists ==
Country	Ranking	first week	Entry position	Pick position	Weeks in top position	Weeks in the ranking	Last week
Asia
Israel	Top 50 songs	02/07/2013	9	1	4	?	?
Europe
Spain	Top 50 songs	23/07/2013	49	49	1	1	23/07/2013
Belgium	Top 100 songs	14/08/2013	97	97	2	3	04/08/2013
