= Danna International (Offer Nissim Presents) =

Dana International דנה אינטרנשיונל

Studio album by Dana International
- Released: 1993
- Recorded: 1992/1993
- Genres: Dance; electronica
- Labels: IMP Dance; IMP 2004
- Producer: Offer Nissim

Dana International chronology
Dana International דנה אינטרנשיונל (1993)	Umpatampa (1994)

Danna International (Offer Nissim Presents) is the first album by Israeli singer Dana International, released in 1993. In her early days it was common to see her first name spelt "Danna". The album's catalogue number is IMP Dance 1993 - IMP 2004, although quite a few copies of the album misprint the catalogue number as "IMP 4004" on the CD label.

The album has covers of Baccara's popular 1970s disco hit "Yes Sir, I Can Boogie" and the Queen song "The Show Must Go On" sung in Hebrew, with the chorus in English. The song "Fata Morgana" appears on this album in two different versions. Singer Ofra Haza and the Austrian band Erste Allgemeine Verunsicherung recorded totally different songs each with the same name.

The Danna International album includes songs sung in three languages; Hebrew, Arabic and English.

During 1994, bootleg cassette copies of Danna International became a smash hit in Egypt, despite being banned by the government's censors. The recordings were only obtainable at a section at a music kiosk in Cairo, granted that the user said the codeword Sousou, which was taken from the Arabic verse of the song Saida Sultana. The song in itself was also popular at local discos.

== Track listing ==
Note: Hebrew language tracks appear in Hebrew script on the cover notes. The language in which the songs are sung and the English translations of the titles do not appear on the cover, they are here for informational purposes only, (apart from "Yes Sir, I Can Boogie" and "No Alibi").

1. "Fata Morgana" (Hebrew) - 4:42
2. "Samar-Mar" (Arabic) - 3:55
3. "Mi SheLo Rotze Oti" (Hebrew; "Who Does Not Want Me") - 3:57
4. "Miskhaq HaDma'ot" (Hebrew; "The Game of Tears") - 2:59
5. "No Alibi" (English) - 4:12
6. "Arusa" (Arabic; "Bride") - 3:39
7. "Yes Sir, I Can Boogie" (English) - 4:25
8. "Sa'Ida Sultana" (Arabic; "Miss Sultana") - 5:44
9. "Danna International" (Radio Edit) (Arabic/English) - 3:52
10. "HaHatzaga Khayevet Lehimashekh" (Hebrew/English; "The Show Must Go On") - 3:06
11. "Fata Morgana" (Strings Mix) - 4:42
12. "Samar-Mar" (Night Mix) - 3:45
13. "Danna International" (Airport Version) - 3:53
