= E.P.Tampa (Offer Nissim Featuring) =

EP by Dana International
- Released: 1995
- Recorded: 1995
- Genre: Dance
- Label: IMP Dance; IMP 2022

Dana International chronology
Umpatampa (1994)	E.P.Tampa (Offer Nissim Featuring) (1995)	Maganuna (1996)

E.P. Tampa is the first extended play by Israeli singer Dana International, released on the IMP Dance label in 1995.

E.P. Tampa, released in Israel with the catalogue number IMP 2022, is a remix album with two new recordings: "Flash Gordon" and "Mi She-Lo Roked - Omed", the latter a duet with Tzvika Pik who later composed Dana's Eurovision Song Contest winner "Diva".

The E.P. Tampa album includes songs sung in three languages; Hebrew, Arabic and French.

== Track listing ==
Note: on the CD cover only song titles appear with time lengths in Hebrew script, except for "Qu'est-Ce Que C'est". Remix descriptions appear in Latin script. Additional details such as the language in which the songs are sung and English translations of the song titles are given here for informational purposes only.

1. "Ani Rotza Likhyot" (Hebrew; "I Want To Live") – 3:55
2. "Mi SheLo Roqed - 'Omed" (Hebrew; "The One Who Doesn't Dance - Stands") (with Tzvika Pick) – 4:00
3. "Flash Gordon" (Hebrew) – 3:52
4. "Layla T'ov, Eiropa" (Hebrew; "Good Evening, Europe") (Club Remix) – 4:09
5. "Danna International" (Arabic) (International Remix) – 4:34
6. "Qu'est-Ce Que C'est?" (French; "What Is It?") (The Ti.Pi.Cal Remix - Italy) – 6:26
7. "Betula" (Hebrew; "Virgin") (Ethnic Virgin Mix) – 3:21
