= Devai Haser =

10th Century Jewish poem by Dunash ben Labrat

Devai Haser is a piyyut by Dunash ibn Labrat (920/925 – after 985), whose first name is signed in the first verse by acrostic. Ashkenazi Jews incorporate the first stanza of the piyyut into the Birkat Hamazon for weddings and Sheva Brachot.

This piyyut, like Dunash's D'ror Yikra, was originally intended for the Sabbath; the content of the piyyut suggests that it is meant to be recited immediately before the Priestly Blessing. Some say that the practice of reciting the first stanza after weddings and sheva brachot owes to the general obligation to temper celebration with reminder of the destruction of the temple, à la "Let my tongue cleave to the roof of my mouth, If I remember thee not; if I set not Jerusalem above my chiefest joy." One 15th-century machzor describes the first stanza as "a song for weddings by Dunash ibn Labrat, in the metre of Adon Olam." Originally the stanza was recited responsively.

== Versions ==
Some prayerbooks recommend slight variations in wording, such as replacing "Guide the blessing of the sons of Aaron" with "Guide the blessing of the sons of Jeshurun" when there are no kohanim present. However, Solomon Hanau opposed this innovation on the grounds that it makes no sense.

In many recent prayerbooks, both options are printed in sequence: "Guide the blessing of the sons of Jeshurun, the sons of Aaron." Abraham David Wahrman suggested that, in order to make this fit with the meter of the preceding line while enhancing the rhyme, one should read "Steer us to the right path and success; Make the blessing of Jeshurun like that of the sons of Aaron".

Geniza fragments evidence at least three more verses (preserved are 1,3,6-7) but none have survived complete.

== Words ==
Four verses are preserved in T-S K8 86:

Hebrew Original	English translation
דְּוַי הָסֵר וְגַם חָרוֹן, וְאָז אִלֵּם בְּשִׁיר יָרוֹן. נְחֵנוּ בְמַעְגְּלֵי צֶדֶק, שְׁעֵה בִרְכַּת בְּנֵי אַהְרֹן.	Banish illness, and also anger, And then the mute will sing with joy! Steer us on the right paths, Guide the blessing of Aaron's sons.
אֲרוּרִים [הַ]ךְ אֲשֶׁר אָרוּ חֲבַצֶּלֶת הַשָּׁרוֹן וְצָרֵי עַמְּךָ כֻלָּם, לְשִׁגָּעוֹן וְעִוָּרוֹן.	Cursed be they who plucked the Rose of Sharon, And the enemies of your people, all to blindness and madness.
וְיַקְרִיבוּ בְיוֹם שַׁבָּת בְּחִירֶיךָ בְנֵי אַהְרֹן, שְׁנֵי כְבָשִׂים בְּנֵי שָׁנָה וְלַכֶּבֶשׂ עִשָּׂרוֹן.	And they'll sacrifice on the Sabbath day, Your chosen sons of Aaron, Two yearling sheep, and for each sheep a measure.
וְיָשִׁירוּ בְנֵי לֵוִי חֲסִידֶיךָ בְקוֹל גָּרוֹן, וְשִׁירָתָם תְּהֵא לָעַד וְתִכָּתֵב לְדוֹר אַחְרֹן.	And the sons of Levi will sing, Your kindnesses, loudly, And their songs will last forever, And be inscribed for the final generation.
