= 2018 Israeli LGBTQ strike =

2018 series rally and protest for LGBTQ equal rights in Israel

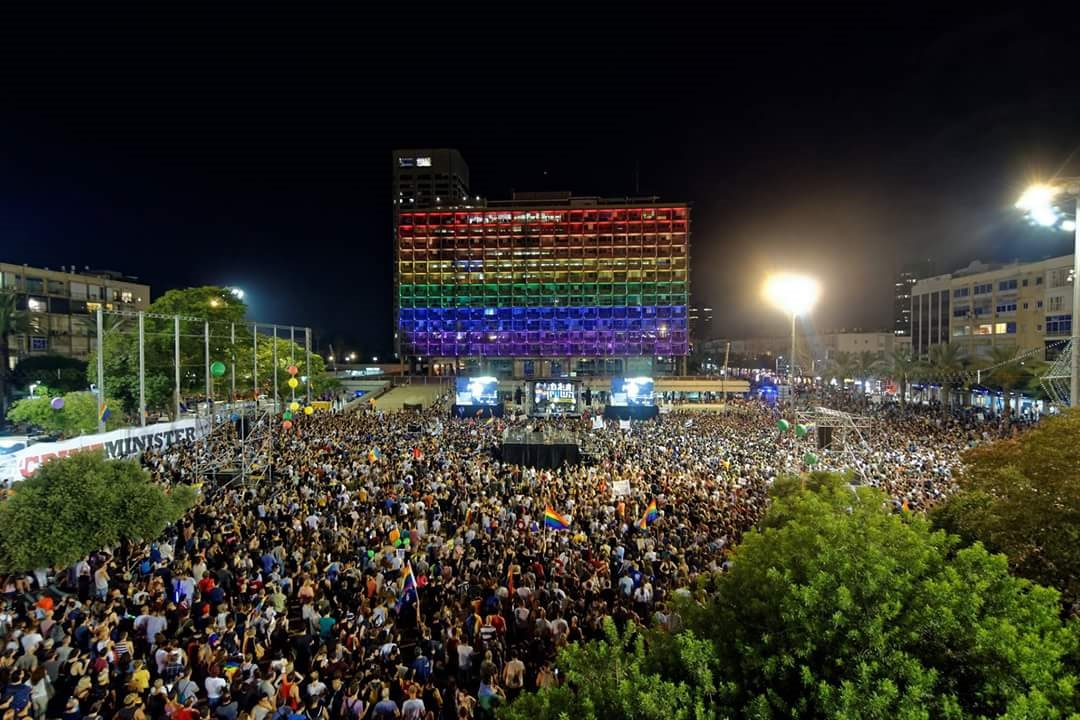
Protesters in main demonstration "Equality for the LGBT community" at Rabin Square

On July 22, 2018, Israeli members of the LGBTQ community went on strike to protest the Israeli Surrogacy Law's discrimination against the LGBTQ community, and the continuing violence towards the Israeli trans community. During the strike, which was held on the Jewish fast day of Tisha B'Av, many organizations and companies allowed their employees to be absent to participate in the protest. Protest events that were held across the country, including in Tel Aviv-Yafo, Jerusalem, Haifa, Be'er Sheba, Ra'anana and other cities.

== Background ==
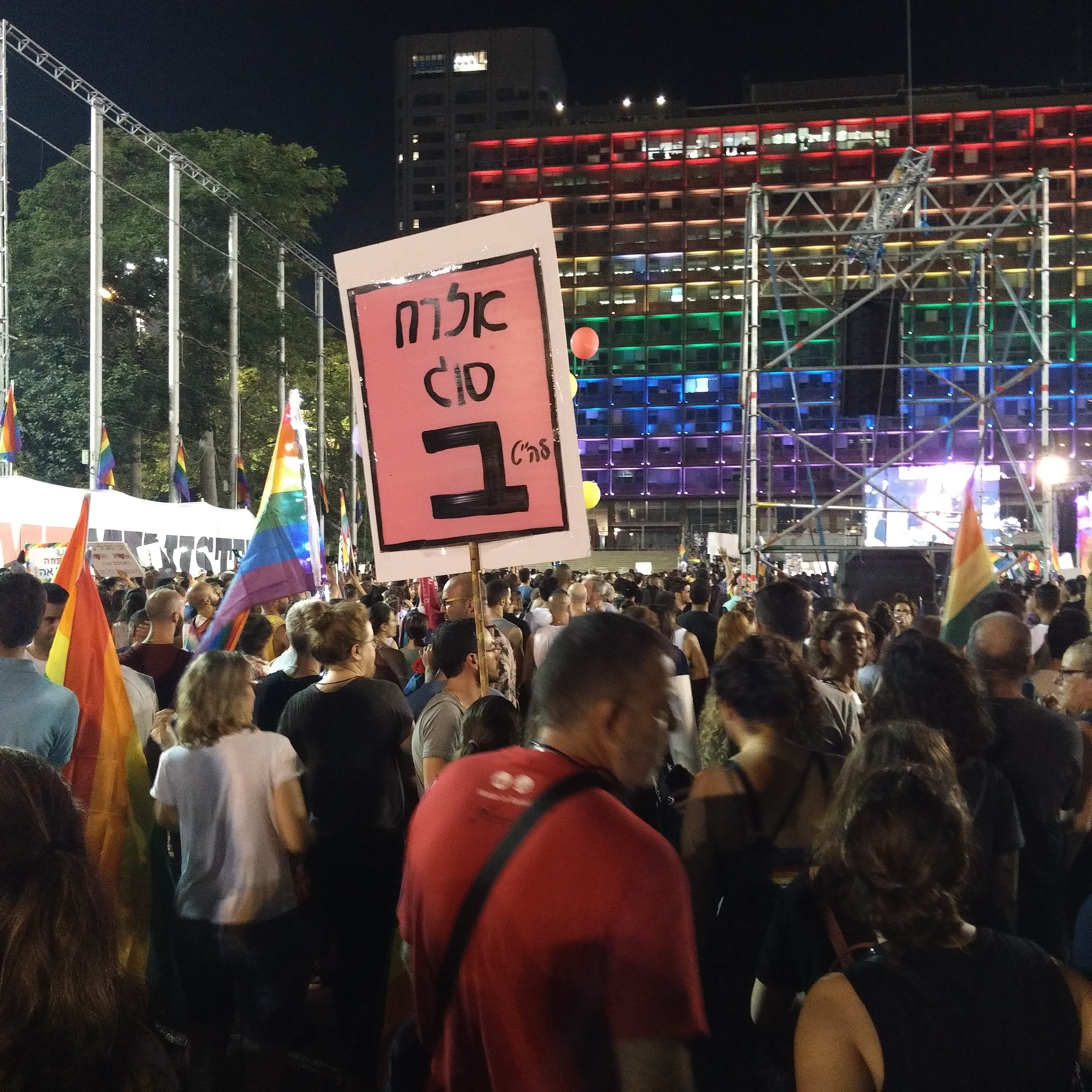
Protesters in the main rally in Rabin Square. The sign translates into "2nd class citizen". The literal translation of the sign is "type B citizen", with the "B" also being used in the Hebrew equivalent of the LGBT acronym.

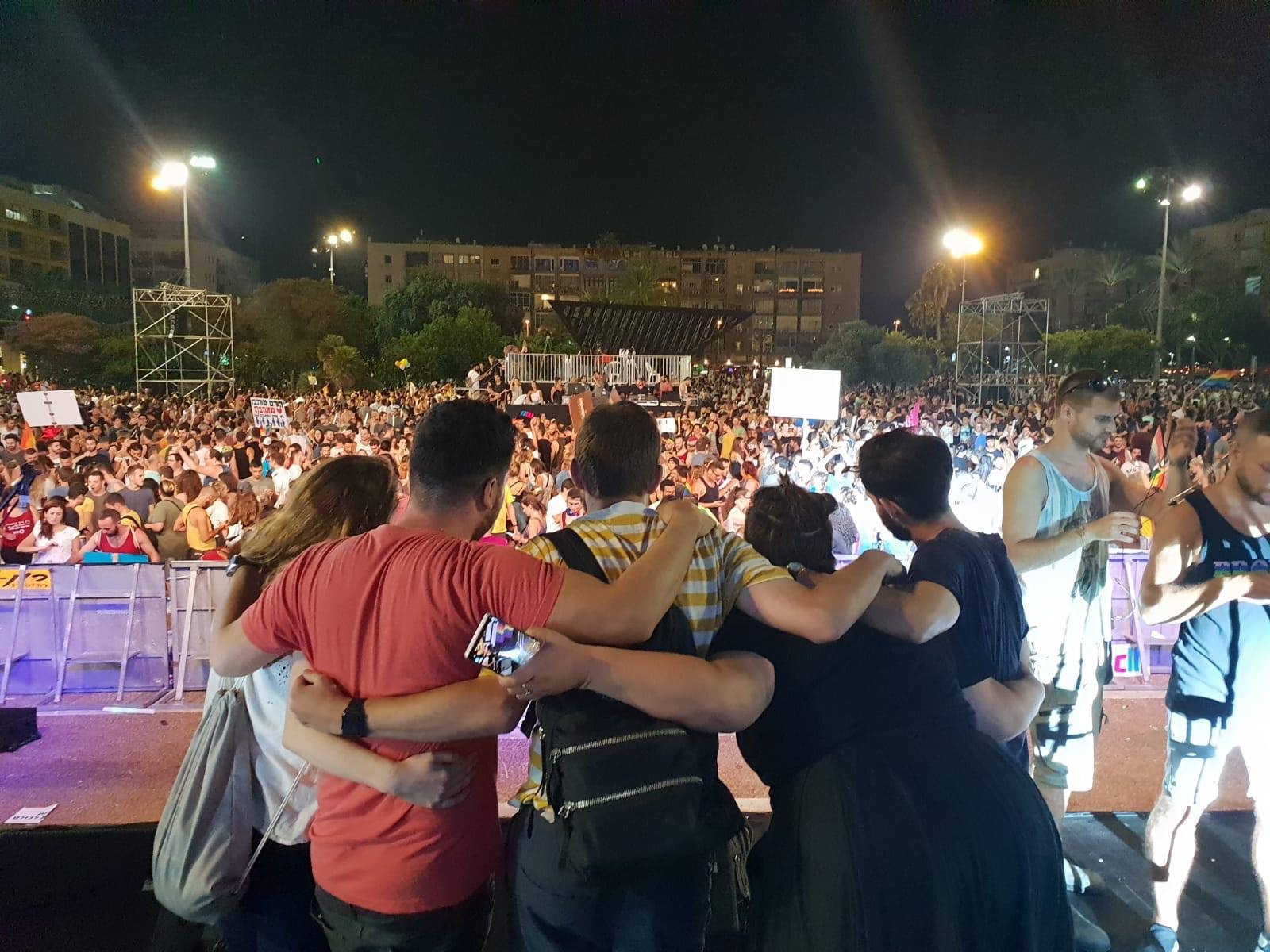
Strike leaders on the main stage. From left to right: Roni Belenki, Ran Shalhavi, Yarden Brikman, Chen Arieli, Ohad Hizki

Following a Supreme Court case regarding the 1997 Israeli Surrogacy Law, which sought to include gay couples under the law, the State responded that the law would be amended. To make the appropriate changes, the government formed several professional health committees, such as the Mor-Yosef committee, which then passed along their recommendations to Minister of Health, Yael German. After the 34th government was formed, headed by Benjamin Netanyahu, this issue was discussed in the Knesset's Labour, Welfare, and Health Committee headed by Eli Alaluf. In the proceedings to bring the bill to a second and third reading, the committee voted to add single women to the bill, while still excluding single men and gay couples from using surrogacy.

The bill was brought to its second and third reading on July 18, 2018, with reservations, including one by Amir Ohana of the Likud Party, adding single men to the bill. Because of the stance declared by the ultra-orthodox factions in the coalition, headed by the United Torah Judaism, the coalition decided to oppose the reservation while supporting the original amendment. Prior to the vote, Prime Minister Benjamin Netanyahu published a video to his Facebook page, explaining that he will support a future amendment to the bill that will be brought by MK Ohana during the Knesset's Winter Session, to allow single men to use surrogacy in Israel, but despite his support, he voted against Ohana's reservation. The Knesset then passed the amended bill in its original form with 59 for and 52 against.

Other pressing issues during that time were several lesbian couples who are fighting for the state's recognition of their joint parenthood, and in at least one case that went public, 2 women found out that they were unilaterally removed as the second parents from their children's birth certificates.

Even before the vote, on July 14 and July 17, demonstrations against it were held in Tel Aviv and in Jerusalem. On July 19, protesters walked to the government office building in Tel Aviv.

Around the same time, on July 17, a sex worker trans woman was stabbed in her apartment in south Tel Aviv.

== Planning ==
As a result of the vote on the bill and the reservation, LGBTQ rights organization The Aguda called members of the LGBTQ community to strike on Sunday, July 22 (Sunday being the first workday in Israel).

A strike was first suggested following a protest in July 2017, which brought around 15,000 protesters against the Ministry of Welfare's stance in a Supreme Court hearing regarding adoption by same-sex couples. In a position paper presented to court, the ministry claimed that same-sex parents are "anomalous" and therefore could not become adoptive families. After receiving public pressure, welfare minister Haim Katz announced that he planned to change the ministry's stance on the issue.

In order to plan the strike, many PR and advertising agencies and journalists were contacted to pressure companies in Israel to prepare for a future strike.

When the new surrogacy law passed in the Knesset, which included only single women but not single men or gay couples, Israeli LGBTQ organizations, headed by the Aguda, decided to implement the strike plan immediately. The organizers contacted CEOs and prominent public figures and asked them to join the strike and have their companies and organizations publish their support. Most agreed, although some gave their support after organizers said they would publicize companies’ lack of support through traditional and social media. An Israeli economic publication, The Marker, posted a list of companies that refused to support the strike.

=== Corporate sector's support ===
Many Israeli companies and workers unions announced that they would allow their employees to strike in order to attend the protests, without risking their jobs or deducting their pay. In the few days before the strike, more than 250 publicly and privately own businesses announced their support for LGBTQ equality, and allowed their employees to stay home in order to strike and attend the protests. Some companies allowed their employees to use a personal day or an elective day, while some gave the employees a paid one-day leave. One of the first companies to join the strike was Microsoft Israel, which later announced that it would give its employees a grant if they sought to pursue surrogacy outside the country. The companies that supported were from various sectors: law firms, restaurants, architecture firms, communication providers, travel agencies and hi-tech companies, along with big public and government sector organizations, including Ben Gurion Airport, Haifa and Ashdod ports, El-Al and Israir, Teva, Tnuva, cellphone, landline, cable and satellite providers, municipalities, hospitals and emergency services, food chains and supermarkets, banks, credit card companies and more. This was the biggest ever support by businesses for a social cause in Israel, and the first LGBTQ strike in the world.

Israel's Workers Union, the Histadrut, issued a statement that it supported both the protest and the strike, and called employers in the public and private sector to allow employees to strike without harming their rights.

== Protest events ==
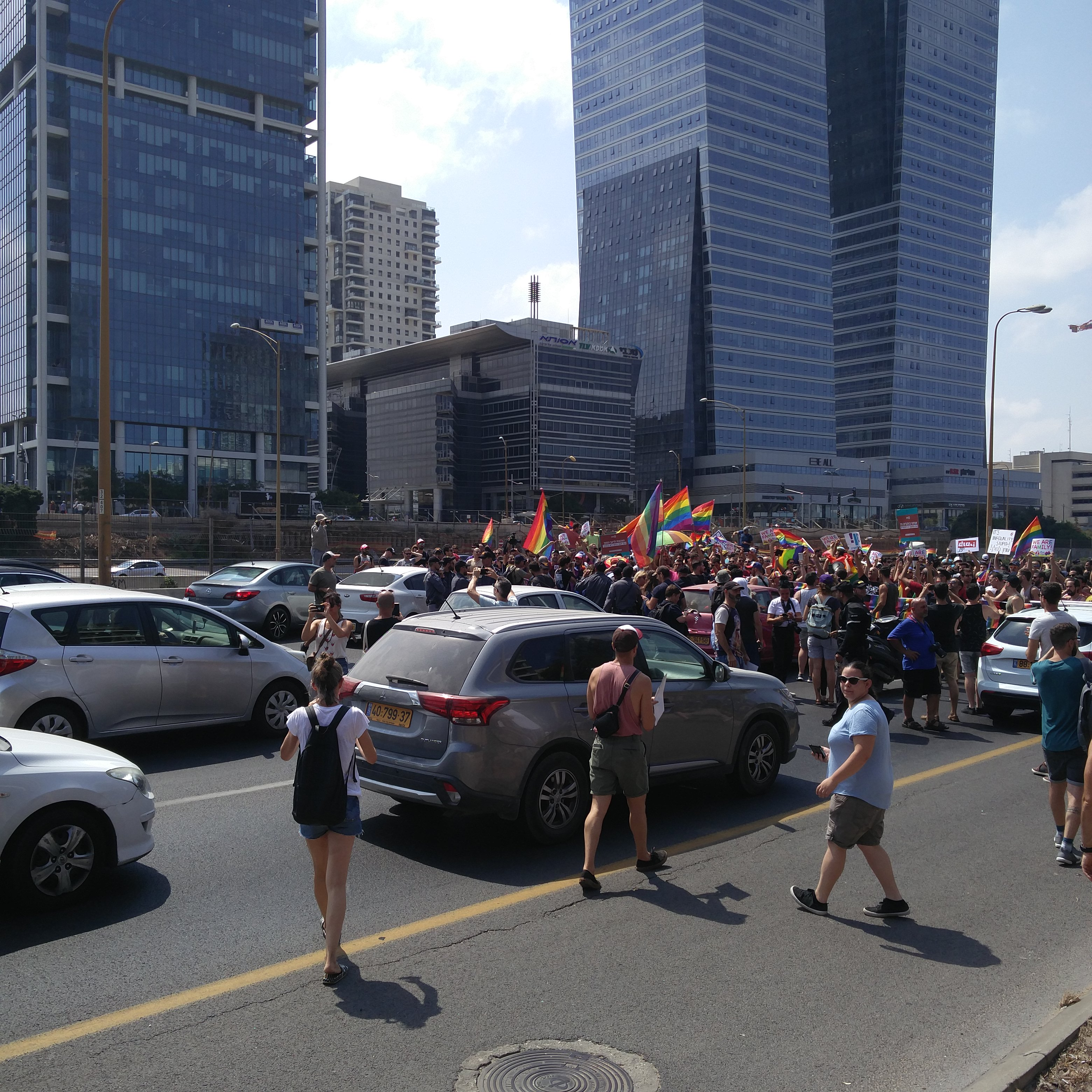
Protesters marching on Ayalon Highway in Tel Aviv

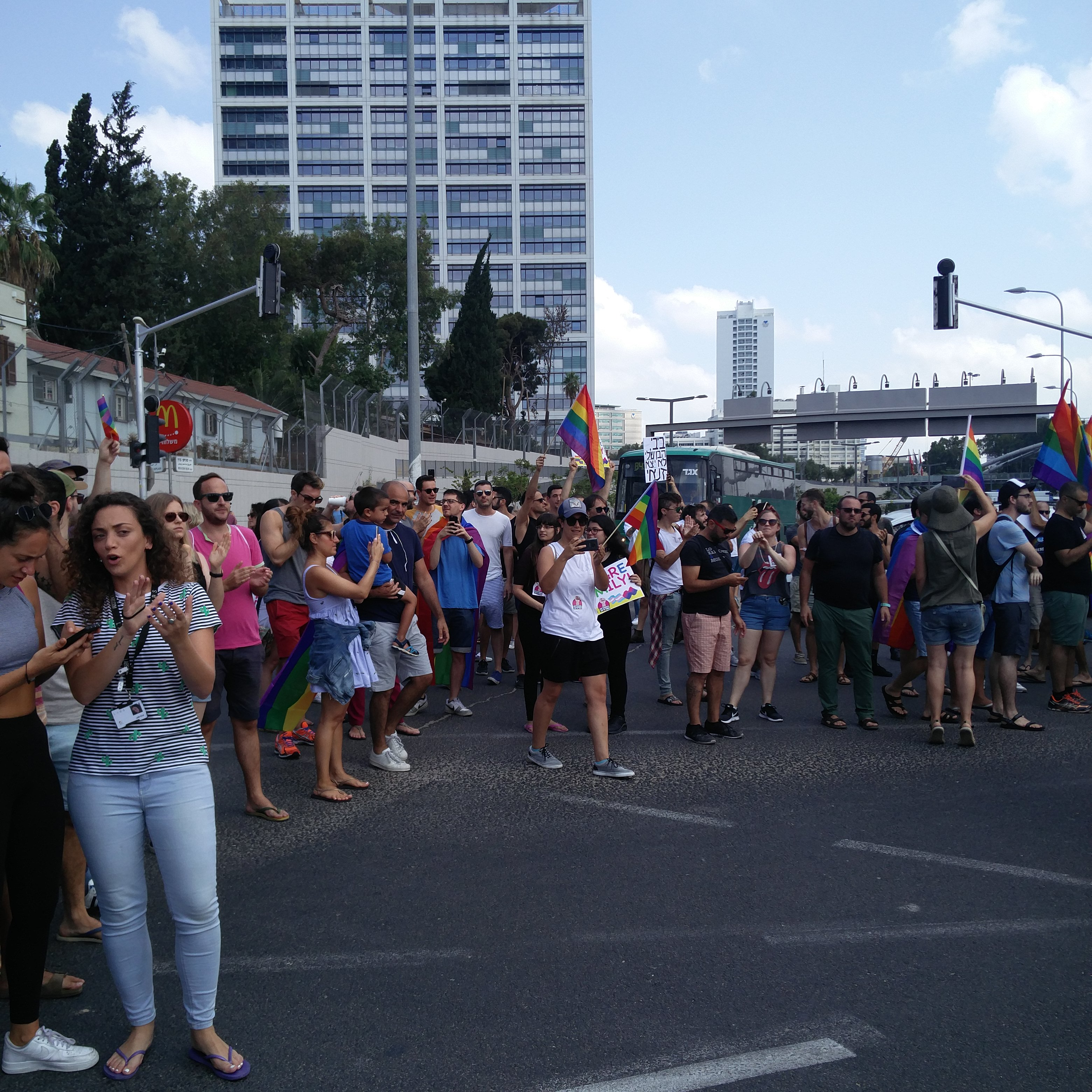
A demonstration on HaShalom Intersection

During the day of the strike, some 1000 strikers in Tel Aviv demonstrated and marched from the government office building on HaShalom Intersection, through Ayalon Highway to Rothschild Boulevard, where a field studio was built, broadcasting live interviews throughout the day. In Jerusalem's France (Paris) Square, outside the Prime Minister's official residence, 250 protesters demonstrated and blocked roads. The police detained 3 demonstrators only to release them later that day. More demonstrations were held around the country – in Haifa's main road, the entrance to Karmiel and other major junctions across the country.

Roads were blocked by protesters in several cities, some of them were main city roads. Around 1000 protesters blocked HaShalom intersection and marched down to the highway, chanting about equality for all, social justice and government-backed discrimination. Protesters also blocked roads in other cities; In a demonstration on Ragher avenue, the main road in Beersheba, a driver tried running over a protester. The end of the protest day was marked with a march in Florentin in south Tel Aviv, supporting the transgender community, following an attempted murder of a trans woman sex worker a few days prior. This attack was the peak of many transphobic acts of violence in Israel. The march ended in the Tel Aviv Central Bus Station, a location known as a center of prostitution, and was attended by around 6000 people, making it the largest transgender demonstration in Israel, to date.

=== Rabin Square rally ===
The strike day, along with its demonstrations and protests against anti-LGBTQ discrimination and violence, culminated in a rally in Rabin Square in central Tel Aviv. According to police estimate, between 80,000 and 100,000 people attended that rally. The rally was hosted by TV presenters Lucy Aharish and Nadav Borenstein, and among the speakers were former parliament member and longtime human rights activist Yael Dayan, actress Orna Banai, and Orly and Ravit Weiselberg-Tzur, who were to appear in front of the Supreme Court the next day in their case pleading to register both of them as their son's parents. Many artists also performed at the rally, like Rita, Dana International, Ilay Botner, Ran Danker, Korin Alal, Rona Kenan and others. All main Israeli broadcast networks dedicated a major part of their programs to the strike, and broadcast live from different demonstrations across Israel, from the strike headquarters in Rothschild Avenue and from the rally in Rabin Square.

== See also ==
- LGBT rights in Israel
- Surrogacy in Israel
