= Idan Yaniv =

Israeli singer (born 1986)

Idan Yaniv עידן יניב
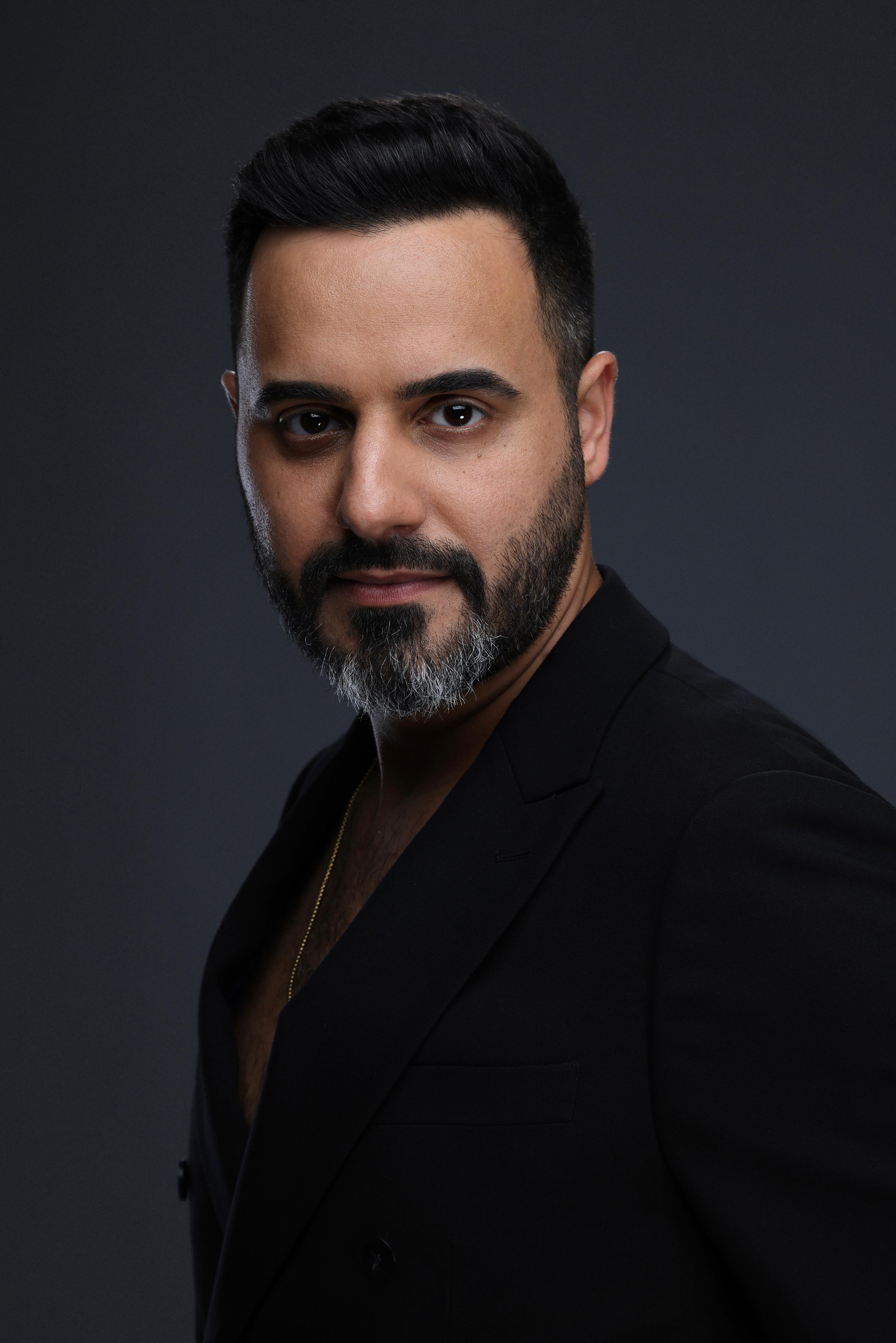
- Idan Yaniv

Background information
- Born: October 18, 1986 (age 38); Tel Aviv, Israel
- Genres: Pop
- Occupation: Musician
- Instrument: Vocals

Idan Yaniv (Hebrew: עידן יניב; born October 18, 1986) is an Israeli singer.

== Biography ==
Yaniv was born in Tel Aviv, to a family of Bukharian origin.

In 2005, Yaniv released his first single, "Wishing Only to Rejoice", which he translated freely from Greek. In 2006, Yaniv released his third single, "Thinking About Her", in a duet with Lior Dataoker, who wrote and composed the song. At the beginning of 2006, the song was a little success on the Jozatz Song Chart, but a few months later it was a huge success on other radio stations and various TV channels. In July 2006, after two years of work, Yaniv's debut album was released, "Thinking About It."

He has successfully recorded five albums with many popular singles. His debut single was "Hoshev Aleha" and it was a hit that generated a lot of attention in Israel and in other Jewish communities in the world. Also, he recorded a duet with famous pop singer Dana International named Seret Hodi ("Movie from India"), and its video reached the top video charts, making it the most requested videoclip in the history of Israel so far. Idan Yaniv became the 2007 Artist of the Year in Israel.

In 2017, Yaniv released his first single called "Who" in preparation for his sixth album, and in 2022, released a new album in collaboration with other artists called "I Love You Everything."

== Discography ==
Title	Hebrew	Translation	Year
Hoshev Aleha	חושב עליה	Thinking about Her	2006
Haki Li	חכי לי	Wait for Me	2007
Al HaRehava	על הרחבה	On The Plaza	2009
