= D'ror Yikra =

10th Century Jewish poem by Dunash ben Labrat

D'ror Yikra (Hebrew: דְּרוֹר יִקְרָא; also spelled Dror Yikra, Deror Yikra and Dror Yiqra) is a piyyut (Jewish religious song or hymn), of the kind known as zemer, traditionally sung during Sabbath meals, particularly the first meal on Friday evening.

Dror Yikra was written in 960 CE in Córdoba by the poet, linguist, and musician Dunash ben Labrat, who is said to have been born in Fez but moved to Spain after a period of study in Baghdad under the rabbinic scholar Saadia Gaon.

According to the ArtScroll Siddur, "Dror Yikra" is "a plea to God to protect Israel, destroy its oppressors, and bring it peace and redemption."

== Words ==
The poem consists of six four-line stanzas with the rhyme-scheme a a a a, b b b b, c c c c, etc. The wording varies slightly between manuscripts. The first three verses make up the song proper; each is signed with the acrostic DUNaSH. Many manuscripts continue with verse 4 or verses 4-5, which are not signed. MS Giessen 742, Add MS 27200, NY JTS 8092, and BUD 370 include verses 1-5 and then continue directly into another poem in a similar metre beginning "אדום עקר", which also completes the poem in abbreviated form in MS Parma 1721. The final verse in prayerbooks and MS Bod. 1100 is grafted from another of Dunash's poems, beginning "דלה שובב" and found in MS 27200, AIU H133, and some Geniza fragments. One Geniza fragment includes four stanzas of Devai Haser, then verses 2,3,1, and 4 (in that order) of Dror Yikra, but these are properly separate piyyutim.

Hebrew Original	English translation	Transliteration
דְּרוֹר יִקְרָא לְבֵן עִם בַּת. וְיִנְצָרְכֶם כְּמוֹ בָבַת. נְעִים שִׁירְכֶם וְלֹא יֻשְׁבַּת. שְׁבוּ וְנוּחוּ בְּיוֹם שַׁבָּת.	He will proclaim freedom to all And he'll keep you as the apple of his eye. Pleasant are your songs, (Note: In many manuscripts and printings, "Pleasant are your names". According to Fleischer, this is clearly incorrect and "makes no sense whatsoever".) which are eternal, Rest and relax on the Sabbath day!	D'ror yikra l'ven im bat, V'yintzorchem k'mo vavat, N'im shimchem v'lo yushbat, SH'vu v'nuchu b'yom shabbat.
דְּרוֹשׁ נָוִי וְאוּלָמִי. וְאוֹת יֶשַׁע עֲשֵׂה עִמִּי. נְטַע שׂוֹרֵק בְּתוֹךְ כַּרְמִי. שְׁעֵה שַׁוְעַת בַּת עַמִּי.	Seek my sanctuary, and my hall, And a sign of salvation, make for me, Plant a vine within my vineyard, Attend the cry of my fair people! (Note: In printings emended to "the sons of my people", which follows the metre more strictly but loses the intended allusion to Jer. 8:19.)	D'rosh navi v'ulami, V'ot yesha aseh imi, N'ta sorek b'toch karmi, SH'e shavat b'nei ami.
דְּרוֹךְ פּוּרָה בְּתוֹךְ בָּצְרָה. וְגַת בֶּאֱדוֹם אֲשֶׁר גָּבְרָה. נְתוֹשׁ צָרַי בְּאַף וְעֶבְרָה. שְׁמַע קוֹלִי בְּיוֹם אֶקְרָא.	Tread a vat within Botzrah, and a press in once-strong Edom, (Note: In printings emended to "and also Babyl". Fleischer says this represents censorship.) Smash my enemies in anger and fury, (Note: In some manuscripts, "on the day of anger", which better fits the metre. However, it is unlikely that the payytan intended to end this line and the final line in this stanza in the same manner (Joshua Isaac Janklowitz, Zemirot leShabbat).) Hear my cry when I call!	D'roch purah b'toch batzrah, V'gam bavel asher gavrah, N'totz tzarai b'af v'evrah, SH'ma koli b'yom ekra.
אֱלֹהַי תֵּן לַמִּדְבָּר הַר. הֲדַס שִׁטָּה בְּרוֹשׁ תִּדְהָר. וְלַמַּזְהִיר וְלַנִּזְהָר. נְטֵה שָׁלוֹם כְּמֵי נָהָר.	My god, grant to the desert mountain, (Note: In some manuscripts, "on the desert mountain".) Fir, acacia, myrtle, elm, And to the leader and the led, spread peace like the river waters. (Note: In some manuscripts and in printings, "Give peace like the river waters". This line exists in several variations.)	Elohim ten b'midbar har, hadas shitah b'rosh tidhar, v'lamazhir v'lanizhar, sh'lomim ten k'mei nahar.
הֲדוֹךְ קָמַי אֵל קַנָּא. בְּמוֹג לֵבָב וּבִמְגִנָּה. וְנַרְחִיב פֶּה וּנְמַלְּאֶ(נָּה). לְשׁוֹנֵנוּ לְךָ רִנָּה.	Cast down my enemies, O zealous God, In fear and with broken hearts, And our mouths will open, and we'll fill our tongues with song to you.	Hadoch kamai, el kanah, b'mog levav uvamginah, v'narchiv peh unmalenah, l'shonenu l'cha rinah.
דְּעֶה חָכְמָה לְנַפְשֶׁךָ. וִיהִי כֶתֶר לְרֹאשֶׁךָ. נְצוֹר מִצְוַת קְדֹשֶׁךָ שְׁמוֹר שַׁבָּת קָדְשֶׁךָ.	Know that wisdom for your soul is like a crown for your head. Keep the commandment of your Holy One, (Note: This stanza is grafted on from another of Dunash's poems, found Add MS 27200. There the penultimate line is נטוך מצוה לדורשיך.) Guard the holy Sabbath.	D'eh chochmah l'nafshecha, V'hi cheter l'roshecha, N'tzor mitzvat k'doshecha, SH'mor shabbat kodshecha.

== Biblical references ==
The poem is full of Biblical references and quotations, sometimes adapted to suit the demands of the metre. For example, the opening words are based on Leviticus 25:10: "You shall proclaim release throughout the land" and Jeremiah 34:15: "Proclaim a release for them". "He will keep you as the apple (or pupil) of His eye" is based on Deuteronomy (32:10): "He engirded him, watched over him, guarded him as the pupil of His eye". "Pleasant is Your name" is based on Psalm 135:3: "Sing hymns to His name, for it is pleasant"; and "Repose, rest" comes from Numbers 22:19 ("sit and rest").

== Interpretation ==
The poem has been commented on by such commentators as Jacob Emden (Beit Yaakov), Ya'akov Yosef HaKohen (Ben Porat Yosef, Toldot Yaakov Yosef), and Judah Leib Oppenheim (Mateh Yehuda).

Yehoshua Grant of the Hebrew University of Jerusalem has proposed that "Dror Yikra," on account of its incorporation of a new poetic tradition emerging out of Andalusia at the time, may be indicative of "the most important turning point...of medieval Hebrew poetry." Grant identifies three structural properties that suggest a synthesis of traditional and novel forms: the rhyme ending repeating four times in each stanza recalls a pattern commonly found in early Hebrew liturgical poetry; the acrostic manifestation of the author's name is similarly characteristic of an ancient tradition; the carefully measured meter, however, was unprecedented in the annals of Hebrew poetry.

== Metre ==
The poem was unusual for the time since unlike previous piyyutim, its language is entirely Biblical, rather than a mixture of Biblical and later Hebrew. Secondly, Dunash was apparently the first Jewish poet to write Hebrew using Arabic quantitative metres (up to his time, Hebrew poetry had been based on stress, not on quantity). Dunash's two innovations caused a revolution in Jewish poetry and influenced all later poets.

The metre itself is the Arabic-Persian hazaj metre (called in Hebrew הַמִּשְׁקָל הַמַּרְנִין, ha-mishqal ha-marnin), which is based on a repeated rhythm of short-long-long-long (u – – –), a rhythm which it shares with the well-known Adon Olam. These days it is sung to two or three different tunes, not all of which, however, follow the rhythm of the metre.

== Modern performances ==
"Dror Yikra" is often sung to the tune of Simon & Garfunkel's "Scarborough Fair" and the Beach Boys' "Sloop John B."

The song has been covered extensively by various Israeli artists, among them the Parvarim, Yaffa Yarkoni, Bo'az Shar'abi, and Ofra Haza. At the 1999 Eurovision Song Contest in Jerusalem, transgender Israeli artist Dana International performed "Dror Yikra," despite threats from Orthodox Jews to disrupt the performance.

== See also ==
- Music of Israel
- Jewish music

== Bibliography ==
- Rosenfeld-Hadad, Merav (2011) Mishaf al-Shbahot - The Holy Book of Praises of the Babylonian Jews: One Thousand Years of Cultural Harmony between Judaism and Islam. In M.M. Laskier and Y. Lev. "The Convergence of Judaism and Islam: Religious, Scientific, and Cultural Dimensions". University Press of Florida.
