= Dana International =

Israeli singer

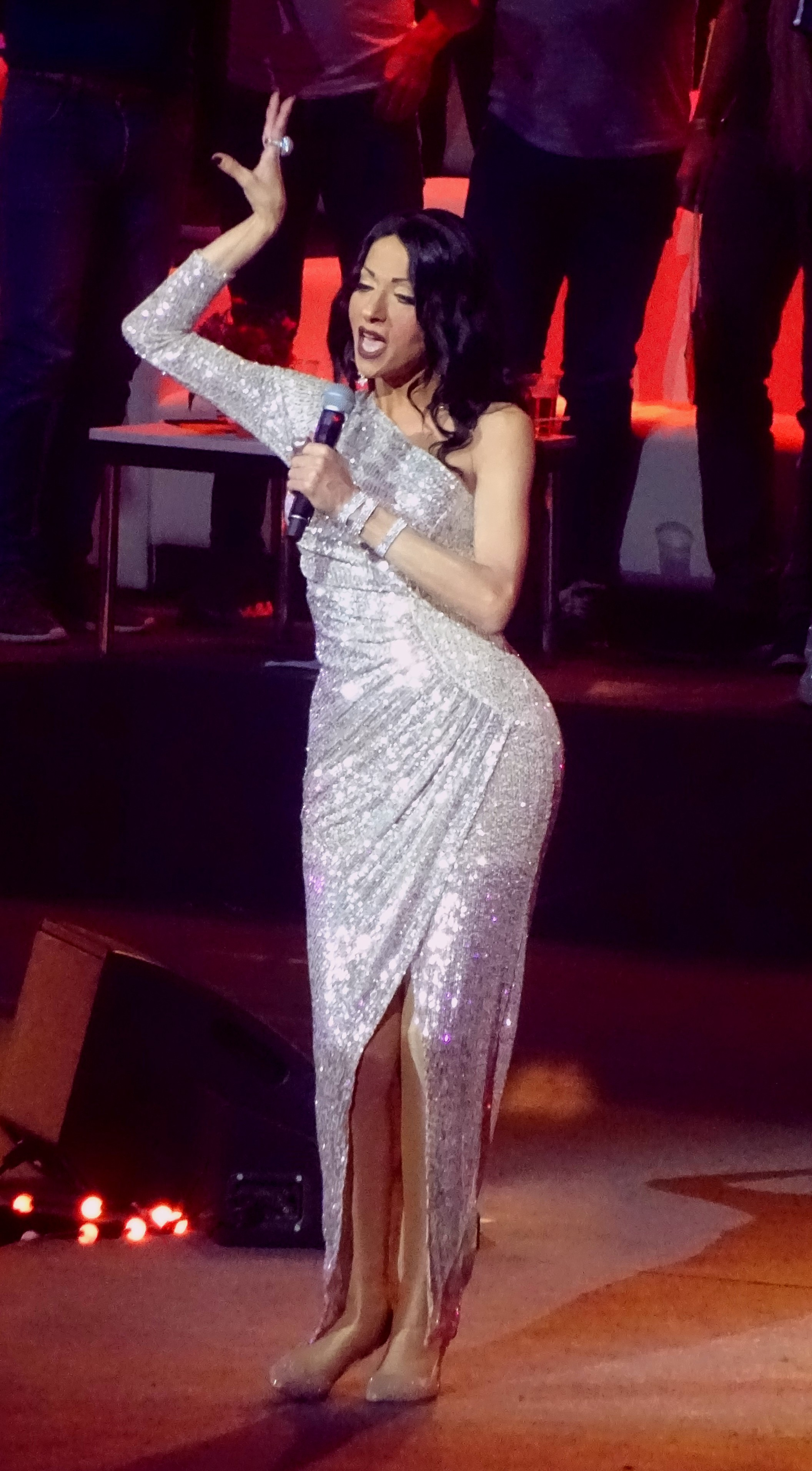
- Dana International performing at Het Grote Songfestivalfeest, 2019

Background information
- Also known as: Sharon Cohen
- Born: 2 February 1969 (age 57); Tel Aviv, Israel
- Genres: Dance; pop; world; trance
- Occupations: Singer
- Years active: 1992–present
- Label: Hed Arzi
- Website: danainternational.com

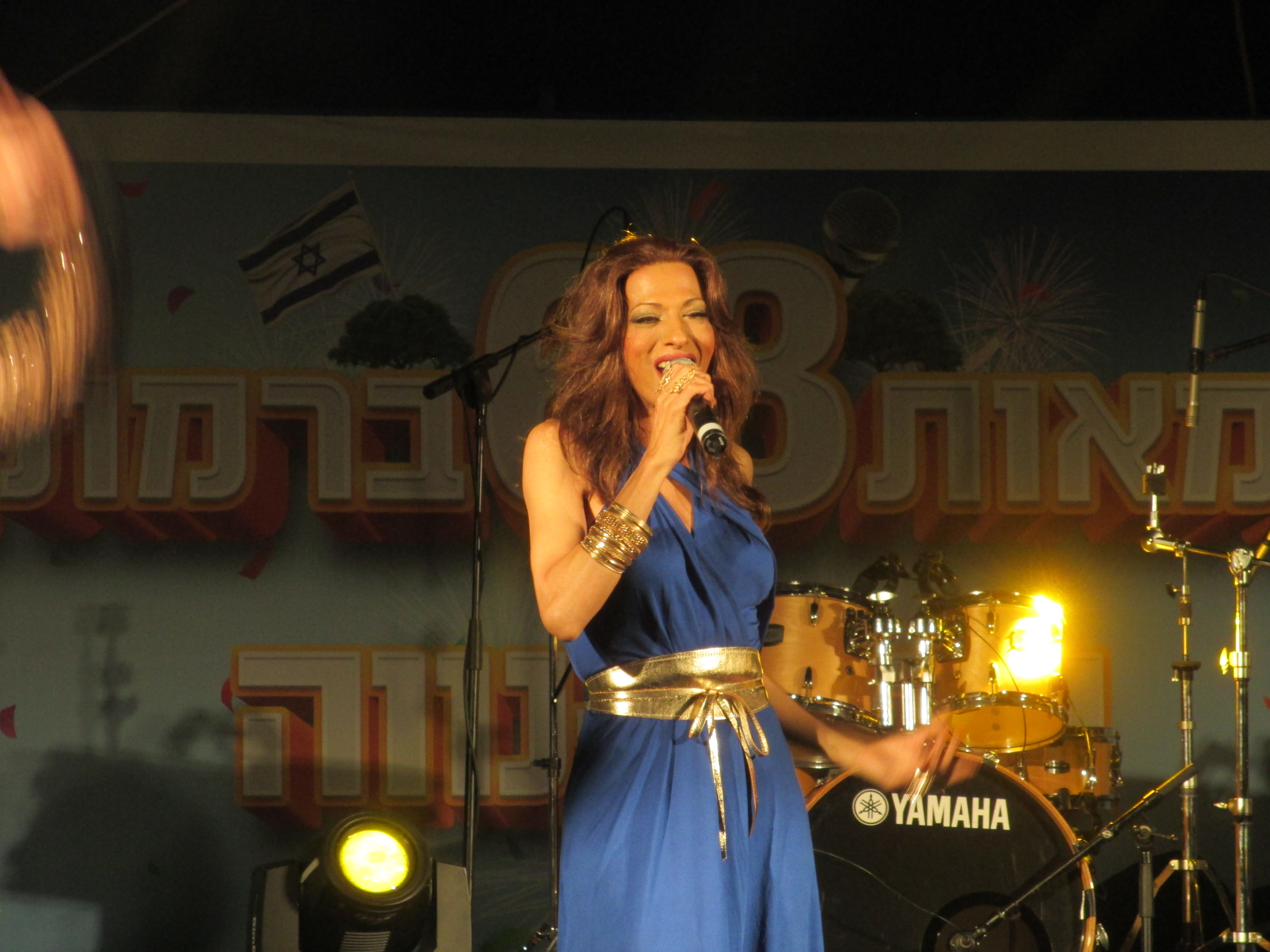
Dana International performing in 2016

Sharon Cohen (Hebrew: שרון כהן; born 2 February 1969), professionally known as Dana International (Hebrew: דנה אינטרנשיונל), is an Israeli pop singer. She has released eight albums and three additional compilation albums. She was the winner of the Eurovision Song Contest 1998 in Birmingham with the song "Diva" - the first transgender winner in Eurovision history.

After consolidating her initial commercial success with the albums Umpatampa (1994) and Maganuna (1996), she was selected in 1998 to represent Israel in the Eurovision Song Contest with her song "Diva". Placing first at the international competition, she came to public attention throughout Europe.

Following her success with the albums Free (1999), Yoter VeYoter (2001), HaHalom HaEfshari (2002) and Hakol Ze Letova (2007), she represented Israel in Eurovision a second time in 2011, this time with the song "Ding Dong", which failed to make it into the final. The same year, she became a judge on the Israeli television music talent contest Kokhav Nolad.

== Early life ==
Cohen was born in Tel Aviv, Israel, to a family of Yemenite-Jewish descent. Her paternal grandparents lived in Petah Tikva. She is the youngest of three children, and was named after an uncle who had been killed during a terrorist attack.

Though assigned male at birth, she identified as female from a very young age. She wanted to become a singer from the age of eight. Although the family was quite poor, her mother worked to pay for her music lessons, and she stated that her childhood was happy. She came out as transgender at the age of 13.

== Career ==
=== 1990–1993: Dana International ===
At 18 years of age, Cohen (still legally male at the time) earned a living as a drag queen, parodying many famous female singers. During one of her performances, she was discovered by Offer Nissim, a well-known Israeli DJ, who produced her debut single "Saida Sultana" ("The Great Saida"), a satirical version of Whitney Houston's song "My Name Is Not Susan". The song received considerable exposure and helped launch her career as a professional singer.

In 1993, Dana International flew to London for male-to-female sex reassignment surgery and legally changed her name to Sharon Cohen. Returning home with her new name, that same year Cohen released her first album, titled Danna International, in Israel. Soon after, the album was also released in several other countries including Greece, Jordan, and Egypt (In Jordan and Egypt the album sold illegally; in the latter's case, these were only accessible at a music kiosk in Cairo by saying the code word "sousou", which was taken from the Arabic verse of Saida Sultana). Sharon's stage name Dana International comes from the title track of the album, and was originally spelled with two n's. Danna International soon became a gold record in Israel.

=== 1994–1995: Umpatampa and Eurovision Song Contest ===
In 1994, Dana released her second, Trance-influenced album Umpatampa, which built on the success of her debut and provided further hit singles. The album went platinum in Israel and has sold more than 50,000 copies to date. Because of her popularity and the success of this album, she won the award for Best Female Artist of the Year in Israel.

In 1995, Dana attempted to fulfill her childhood dream of performing in the Eurovision Song Contest. She entered the Eurovision qualifying contest in Israel with a song entitled "Layla Tov, Eropa" ("Good Night Europe") which finished second in the pre-selections, but became another hit single.

In late 1995, Dana released an E.P. called E.P. Tampa with three new songs and four remixes and special versions of her earlier songs.

=== 1996–1998: Consolidating popularity, Diva and mainstream spotlight ===
In 1996, Dana released her third album, Maganuna. Although this album was less successful than her previous efforts, it still reached gold record sales in Israel and included the hits "Don Quixote", "Menafnefet" (Waving) and the club favorite "Cinque Milla." In 1997, Dana collaborated with the Israeli artist Eran Zur on his album Ata Havera Sheli, and together they sang the duet "Shir Kdam-Shnati (Sex Acher)" ("Pre-Bed Song (A Different Kind of Sex)") which became a huge hit. Still in 1997, following a visit to Cairo for an autobiographic film, Egyptian authorities banned her music. Local newspapers considered her to be an "Israeli prostitute"; while conservative preachers believed that she was "part of a Mossad conspiracy".

Dana was chosen to represent Israel in the Eurovision Song Contest 1998 in Birmingham with the song "Diva". Orthodox Jews and others with conservative views were opposed to the choice and attempted to void her participation in the contest. In May 1998, Dana performed "Diva" at the Eurovision final and won the contest with 172 points. She became known internationally, and was interviewed by CNN, BBC, Sky News, and MTV, among others, mostly focusing on her life as a transsexual person before winning the contest. Dana's message of reconciliation was: "My victory proves God is on my side. I want to send my critics a message of forgiveness and say to them: Try to accept me and the kind of life I lead. I am what I am and this does not mean I don't believe in God, and I am part of the Jewish Nation."

Dana released "Diva" as a single in Europe and it became a hit, reaching number 11 in the UK charts and the top ten in Sweden, Belgium, Finland, Ireland, and the Netherlands.

=== 1999–2001: Stage falling, Streisand cover and new albums ===
In 1999, Dana released "Woman in Love", a Barbra Streisand cover. In May 1999, Dana again participated in the Eurovision Song Contest held in Jerusalem. Dana was a part of the interval act and sang the Stevie Wonder song "Free". One memorable moment from the event happened when she presented the award to the winners of the contest. Whilst she was carrying the heavy trophy, one of the composers of the winning Swedish entry stepped on the long trail of her dress by mistake, and she fell over on stage – in front of a television audience estimated to be one million or more, making it one of the most memorable moments in the 50-year-long history of the contest.

She released her next album Free in Europe in 1999, which enjoyed moderate success. A few months later Dana moved back to Israel and started to work on different projects. Israeli and Japanese editions of Free were released in 2000. That same year, an Israeli documentary film was made about Dana called Lady D.

In 2001, after a break, Dana released her seventh album Yoter Ve Yoter (More and More). The album put her career in Israel back on track and provided two hits called "Ani Nitzachti" (I Won) and "Achrei HaKol" (After All), which eventually both went gold.

=== 2002–2007: Fading from the scene and Sony BMG incident ===
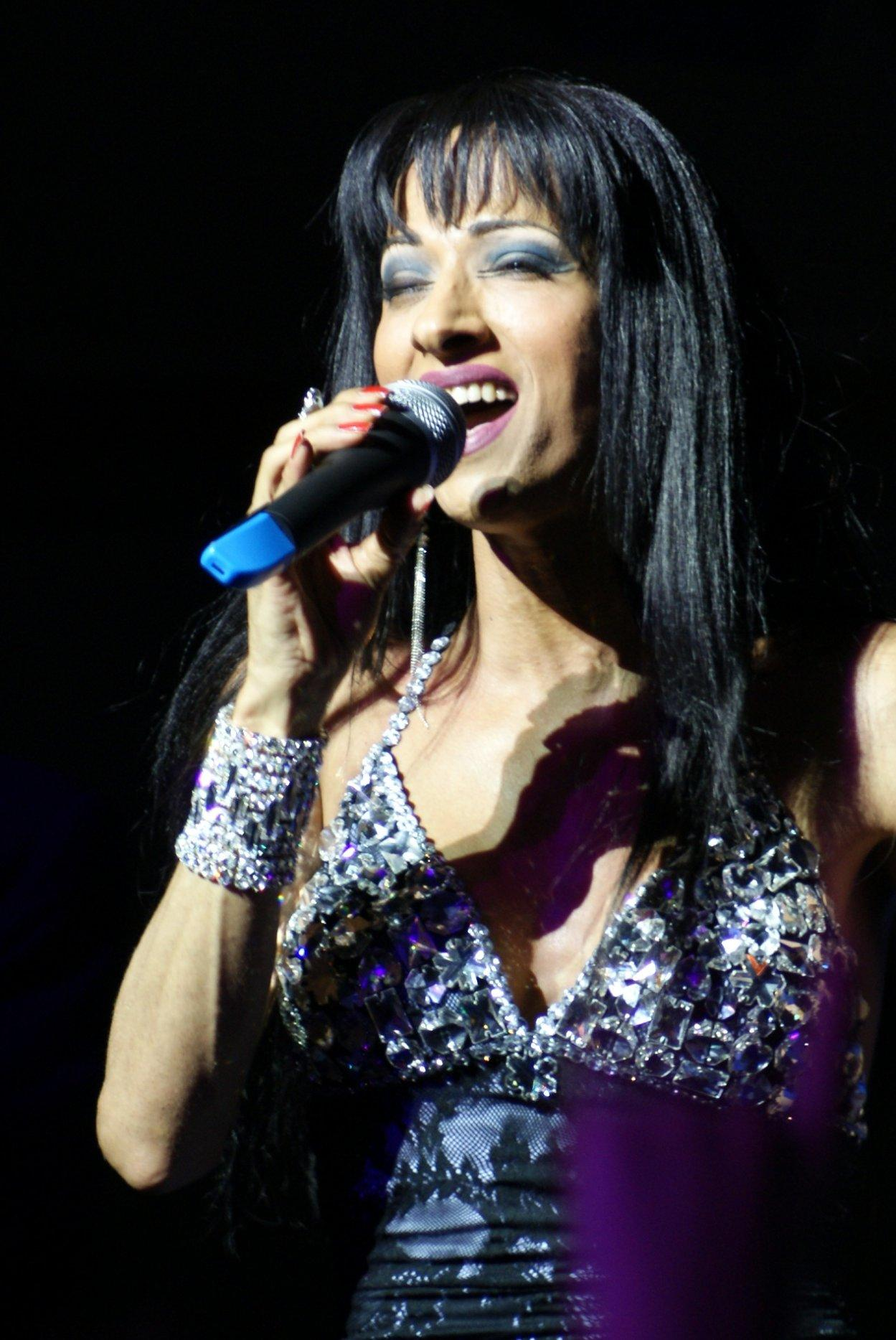
Dana International became a famous singer after winning Eurovision.

Dana was about to sign with a major label, Sony BMG Music Entertainment, for an international recording contract. There were disagreements that led to Sony Music cancelling the deal before it was completed.

In 2002, she released another album, HaHalom HaEfshari (The Possible Dream), which was a minor chart success. In 2003, she released an exclusive 8-CD box set, containing all singles from The Possible Dream and a new house version of the hit single "Cinque Milla", titled A.lo.ra.lo.la.

A few years later, in 2005, Dana participated in the 50th anniversary of the Eurovision Song Contest, held in Copenhagen, after "Diva" was selected as one of fourteen songs considered to be the best Eurovision songs. The song did not make it into the final top five. Dana got the chance to perform both "Diva" and an old Eurovision favourite of hers, Baccara's 1978 entry "Parlez-Vous Français?". She also recorded the song "Lola" (sung in French), to which she released a video. This video can be found on the CD Hakol Ze Letova, released in 2007 as a bonus CD-rom video.

=== 2007–2011: Return to music and Eurovision comeback ===
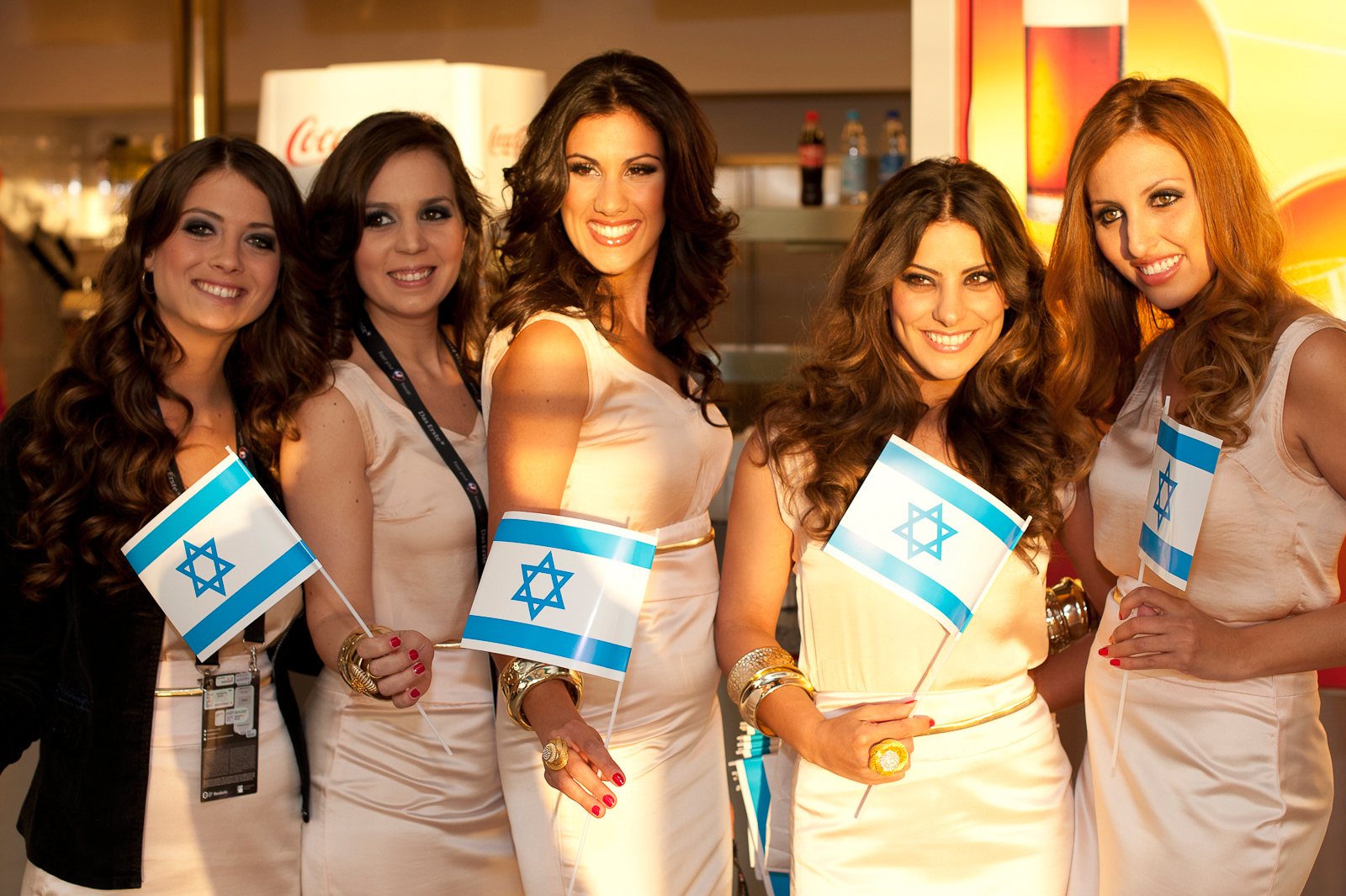
Backing vocalists of Dana International at the Eurovision Song Contest 2011, in Düsseldorf, Germany

After a few years away from show business, together with the relaunch of her official website, a first single of the upcoming album was released in March 2007: "HaKol Ze LeTova" ("It's All For the Best"). The second single to be released from the album, "Love Boy", became the most played song on Israeli radio in a decade. It also gained a respectable place on the airplay of the Greek radio station FLY FM 89,7. The following album, also titled Hakol Ze Letova, was released on 15 August 2007. "At Mukhana" (You Are Ready) was the third single and "Seret Hodi" (Indian Movie; feat. Idan Yaniv) the fourth to be released from the album, which became a bestseller in many online stores. The next single released from the album was "Yom Huledet" (Birthday).

On 26 February 2008, Dana gained an additional achievement when the song "Ke'ilu Kan" written and composed by her and performed by Boaz Mauda, was chosen on Kdam Eurovision to represent Israel at Eurovision Song Contest 2008 in Belgrade, Serbia. It came 5th in the semi-final and gained 9th place in the final rank.

Dana also recorded the song "Mifrats HaAhava" ("The Love Bay") for an Israeli version of the TV-show "Paradise Hotel". She also collaborated with the Ukrainian duo NeAngely (Not Angels), recording "I Need Your Love" and releasing a video. In 2009, Dana starred in a mock reality show called Dana Kama/Nama for cellphone provider Cellcom

Dana campaigned for Kadima chairwoman Tzipi Livni shortly before 2009 legislative elections in Israel. At a women's political rally in Jerusalem Dana performed a disco song alongside Livni onstage, announcing "I now formally invite you to the diva sisterhood."

In April 2009, Dana performed in the opening concert of Tel Aviv-Yafo Centennial Year. She performed a cover version of Danny Robas' song "Lo Nirdemet Tel Aviv" (Tel Aviv Doesn't Fall Asleep) in front of 250,000 people.

Also in 2009, Dana International joined the 7th season of "Kokhav Nolad" (the Israeli version of Pop Idol) as a judge, also joining the 8th one in 2010. Dana made a guest appearance, as herself, in an episode of the second series of UK sitcom Beautiful People, which was set around her Eurovision appearance.

On 8 March 2011, Dana International won the Israeli National Final for Eurovision with the song "Ding Dong", and represented Israel at Eurovision for a second time. The song did not qualify for the final; she thus became the first Eurovision winner to do so.

=== 2013–present: new singles, TV show and album ===
In April 2013, after a two-year break, Dana released a new single, "Ma La'asot" (What To Do). It was released digitally worldwide on 24 April 2013. On 29 May, Dana released a video clip for the song Loca, to promote the Tel Aviv Pride 2013. Dana would perform on the main event for the Gay Pride on 7 June. Her third single for that year, "Ir Shlema" (A Whole City), was released in July. Late in January 2014, Dana's new music reality show "Yeshnan Banot" premiered. Dana is the main judge on the show, attempting to find Israel's next girl group.

Also in 2014, Dana was the main attraction aboard the first Jewish boat to participate in the Amsterdam Pride Canal Parade. Dana stated, "I don't believe in any religion, so I'm here as an Israeli, not as a Jew. But it's time to end the persecution over religion or national reasons. Just cut out all that shit. That's my message." Previously, after she won the Eurovision song competition, a religious debate had been held as to whether, and how, Dana should pray in a synagogue, with one rabbinical authority concluding that Dana should be counted in a minyan as a man. She could not sing in front of the community since she was also a woman, according to the rabbi, and that would violate the Orthodox rule of kol isha.

In June 2017, Dana released a new single, called "Ruti". In August 2017 she released another single, called "Yesh Li Ahava (La Costa)". In November 2017 she released a third single, called "Nish'eret Itcha" (Staying With You).

In April 2018, Dana recorded a new version of the Jewish folk song "Hava Nagila" to promote "Israel Calling", a pre-Eurovision event. 20 years after her win in the 1998 Eurovision Song Contest in Birmingham with her song Diva, Dana released a new version of her hit in June 2018, in association with NYX Hotel and pagfilms.

In July 2018, Dana performed at the rally during the 2018 Israeli LGBT's strike events with her song "Ani Nitzakhti" (I Won). Later that month she released a new version of the Jewish song "Mi Ha'Ish" (Who is the Man) to promote the Jerusalem Pride and Tolerance Parade, in which she performed in August.

In May 2019, Dana performed "Just The Way You Are" as an interval act in the first semi-final of the Eurovision Song Contest 2019, held in Tel Aviv, 20 years after her Eurovision win last brought the contest to Israel. She later performed Omer Adam's "Tel Aviv" and her Eurovision-winning song "Diva" during the final's opening flag parade.

In 2025, Dana was honored as one of the torchbearers in the national Israeli Independence Day ceremony.

== Dana's Eurovision records ==
Year	Artist	Language	Title	Writers	Final	Points	Semi	Points	Kdam
1995	Dana International	Hebrew	"Layla Tov, Eropa"	Dana International	Failed to qualify for Eurovision		No Semi-finals		2
1998	Dana International	Hebrew	"Diva"	Yoav Ginai	1	172	No Semi-finals		–
2008	Bo'az Ma'uda	Hebrew, English	"The Fire in Your Eyes"	Dana International, Shay Kerem	9	124	5	104	1
2011	Dana International	Hebrew, English	"Ding Dong"	Dana International	Failed to qualify		15	38	1

== Discography ==
=== Albums ===
- 1993 Danna International (Offer Nissim Presents), IMP Dance
- 1994 Umpatampa, IMP Dance
- 1995 E.P.Tampa (Offer Nissim Featuring), IMP Dance
- 1996 Maganuna (Crazy), Helicon/Big Foot
- 1998 Diva – The Hits, IMP Dance
- 1998 Dana International The Album, Helicon/Big Foot/PolyGram
- 1999 Free, (European edition), CNR Music
- 2000 Free, (Israeli & Japanese edition), NMC/NXCA
- 2001 Yoter Ve Yoter (More and More), NMC
- 2002 HaHalom HaEfshari (The Possible Dream), IMP Dance
- 2003 The CDs collection, IMP Dance
- 2007 Hakol Ze Letova (It's All for The Best), Hed Arzi Ltd.

=== Singles ===
- 1998 "Diva"
- 2002 "Makat hom (i la dirla da da)"
- 2008 "I Need Your Love (feat. neAngely)"
- 2010 "Alay (feat. Subliminal)"
- 2011 "Ding Dong"
- 2012 "When Men Dance (feat. Yardena Arazi)"
- 2013 "Ma La'asot" (What Can You Do?)
- 2013 "Loca"
- 2013 "Ir Shlema" (Entire City)
- 2014 "Down On Me"
- 2014 "Yeladim Ze Simcha" (Children Are Joy)
- 2014 "Emunot Ktanot" (Little Faiths)
- 2016 "We Can Make It (feat. Offer Nissim)"
- 2017 "Ruti"
- 2017 "Yesh Li Ahava"
- 2017 "Nish'eret Itcha"
- 2019 "Diva to Diva (along Charlotte Perrelli)" (a special single commemorating the 20 years of her victory in the Eurovision Song Contest 1998)
- 2022 "Achala Gvar" (along Static & Ben El Tavori)

== See also ==
- Conchita Wurst
- List of LGBTQ participants in the Eurovision Song Contest

Awards and achievements
Preceded by Harel Skaat with "Milim"	Israel in the Eurovision Song Contest; 2011	Succeeded by Izabo with "Time"
Preceded by (United Kingdom) Katrina and the Waves with "Love Shine a Light"	Winner of the Eurovision Song Contest; 1998	Succeeded by (Sweden) Charlotte Nilsson with "Take Me to Your Heaven"
Preceded by Liora with "Amen"	Israel in the Eurovision Song Contest; 1998	Succeeded by Eden with "Yom Huledet"
