= Stadlshow =

- Directed by: Kurt Palmer
- Presented by: Francine Jordi and Alexander Mazza
- Country of origin: Austria
- Original language: German
- No. of episodes: 1

Production
- Production locations: Austria; Germany; Switzerland; South Tyrol
- Running time: 2 hours 15 minutes (Stadlshow); 3 hours 45 minutes (Silvester-Stadlshow)
- Production companies: Österreichischer Rundfunk; Bayerischer Rundfunk; Schweizer Radio und Fernsehen

Original release
- Release: 12 September 2015

Stadlshow (also called by the show's original name, Musikantenstadl) is a live broadcast entertainment show of German pop music, Schlager and Volkstümliche Musik. The program tours Austria, Germany, Switzerland and South Tyrol being produced by ORF, and broadcast via the Eurovision with the cooperation of Bayerischer Rundfunk and Schweizer Radio und Fernsehen. Formerly known as Musikantenstadl which was produced for over 30 years, the show was remodelled into what is now the Stadlshow in an attempt to attract younger viewers. The show is presented by Francine Jordi and Alexander Mazza.

== Reception ==
The new Stadlshow was broadcast 12 September 2015 and received mainly negative views with the premier show being labelled 'disastrous' and many commenting that Andy Borg, who presented Musikantenstadl for nine years as successor to Karl Moik should return. Borg's last show which was live from Pula, Croatia attracted 673,000 viewers (30 percent) in Austria, whilst the new Stadlshow attracted 526,000. Viewing records in Germany performed even worse only reaching 9.6 percent of German viewers.

Many performers from the volksmusik world voiced their opinion following the premier. Stefan Mross who presents Immer wieder Sonntags stated the new stage set, sound and overall mood of the show was a disaster and he was sad and disappointed. Another volksmusik legend in the German speaking world Heino came up with a five-point plan for the ORF bosses which included:

- Going back to the show's original name 'Musikantenstadl' which he stated was a top brand like Mercedes-Benz. He stated Hansi Hinterseer would make a better main host, Alexander Mazza should be dropped, and Francine Jordi should be an after-stadl host.
- The show should go back to its original Borg stage setting as opposed to the new modern mountain-resort stage.
- There were too many unfamiliar stars in the premier show and that ORF should bring in some already big name stars in volksmusik and schlager.
- Finally the ORF bosses should stop trying to rejuvenate Musikantenstadl for young people when they are not as interested in the stadl as much as older generations and families no matter how much they try. This has been the opinion of many viewers and volksmusik artists alike.

On 31 December 2015, the new Stadlshow new year special, Silvester-Stadlshow was broadcast live from Linz, Austria. Failing to reach high ratings it was decided by ORF to broadcast the Stadlshow only on the New Year's Eve as opposed to a year long program. Most of the critical reception has been a result of ORF's decision to remove Borg and Musikantenstadl which has been received negatively, with many calls for the broadcaster to reverse their decision.

Musikantenstadl is still used in conjunction with Stadlshow when referring to the program as Musikantenstadl technically never ended but was just re-branded.
