= Adiós Amor (disambiguation) =

"Adiós Amor", originally "Adiós Mi Amor"(English: 'Goodbye my Love'), is a song written by Salvador Garza for Los Dareyes de la Sierra.

Adiós Amor may also refer to:

== Film ==
- Adiós Amor, film by Abel Salazar

== Music ==
=== Albums ===
- Adiós Amor, a 1982 album by Andy Borg
- Adiós amor, a 1992 album by Marisela

=== Songs ===
- "Adiós Amor" (Sheila song), 1967
- "Adiós Amor" (Andy Borg song), 1982
- "Adiós Amor (Goodbye My Love)", a 1967 song by José Feliciano
- "Adiós Amor", a 1968 song by the Casuals
- "Adiós Amor", title track from Marisela's 1992 album
- "Adiós Amor", a 1999 song by Mar de Copas

== See also ==
- Adiós, amor mío, a telenovela
- Goodbye My Love (disambiguation)
