= Oberalm =

- Municipality
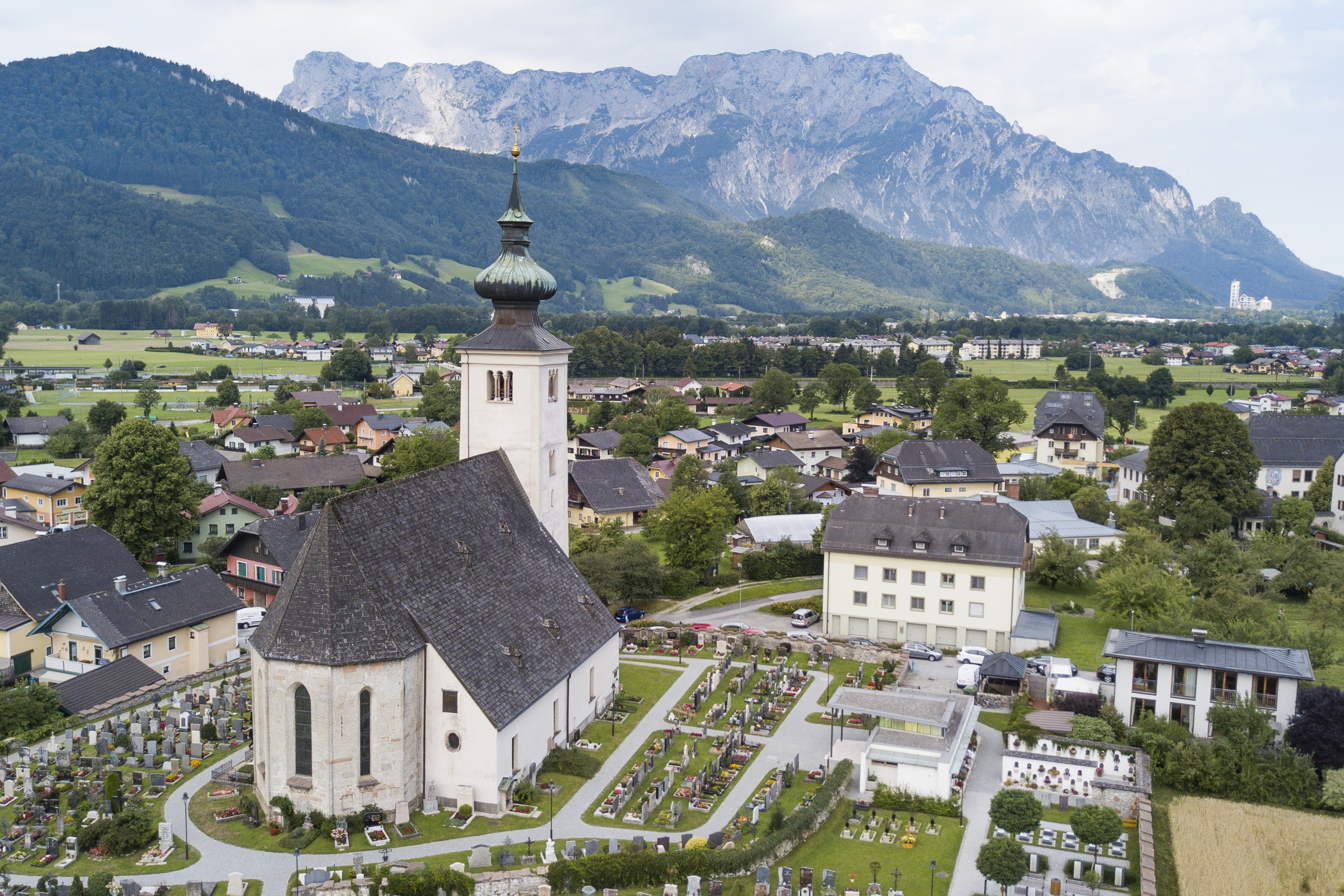

- Coat of arms

- Location within Austria
- Coordinates: 47°42′00″N 13°06′00″E
- Country: Austria
- State: Salzburg
- District: Hallein

Government
  - Mayor: Hans-Jörg Haslauer (ÖVP)

Area
  - Total: 6.39 km^{2} (2.47 sq mi)
- Elevation: 452 m (1,483 ft)

Population (2018-01-01)
  - Total: 4,325
  - Density: 677/km^{2} (1,750/sq mi)
- Time zone: UTC+1 (CET)
  - Summer (DST): UTC+2 (CEST)
- Postal code: 5411
- Area code: 06245
- Vehicle registration: HA
- Website: www.oberalm.at

Oberalm is a market town in the Hallein district in the Austrian state of Salzburg. It is the burial town of volksmusik singer Karl Moik, the longtime presenter of ORF Musikantenstadl.

== See also ==
- Salzburgerland
- Salzburg
