= Goodbye Love =

Goodbye Love may refer to:

- Goodbye Love (film), a 1933 film directed by H. Bruce Humberstone
- "Goodbye Love", a song written by Buzz Clifford and recorded in 1967 by Meredith MacRae
- "Goodbye Love", a song written by Andy McMaster on the albums Bodies and Souls (1973) and Stumbledown Romancer (1988)
- "Goodbye Love", a song written by Alterman/Green a recorded in 1975 by Geordie
- "Goodbye Love", a song written by Jim Capaldi on his 1975 album Short Cut Draw Blood
- "Goodbye Love", a song written by Koos Versteeg and recorded in 1975 by Teach-In
- "Goodbye Love", a 1980 song written by Lewis Furey for the film Fantastica
- "Goodbye Love", a 1982 song by the Steve Miller Band from the album Abracadabra
- "Good Bye Love", a song written by Joseph Eisenhut and recorded by the Fernando Express
- "Goodbye Love", a song and video recorded in 2012 (see Danny! discography)
- "Goodbye Love", a song written by Jonathan Larson for the musical Rent
- "Goodbye, Love", a 2006 Everwood episodes (see List of Everwood episodes)
- Goodbye, Love. Goodbye, Joy. Hello, Travis McElroy, a 2009 play by Aaron Kozak

== See also ==
- Goodbye Lover
- Hello Heartache, Goodbye Love, a 1963 song recorded by Little Peggy March
- Adiós Amor (disambiguation) (English: Goodbye Love)
- Goodbye My Love (disambiguation)
