= Marilena Kirchner =

German singer

- Born: 10 July 1997 (age 27); Fulda
- Genres: volksmusik, schlager
- Occupation: Singer
- Instrument(s): Piano, guitar
- Years active: 2011–present
- Website: marilena-musik.de

Marilena Kirchner (born 10 July 1997), also known as simply Marilena, is a German volksmusik and schlager singer.

== Career ==
On 7 May 2011, Marilena represented Germany with the song "A Lausbua muass er sei" at the young talent competition held in Croatia by Andy Borg's volksmusik television show Musikantenstadl and won with over 58% of the popular vote.

In the summer of 2011, she released her first album, titled Ich bin wie ich bin.

On 16 December 2011, she won the Herbert Roth Prize in the soloist category. The Herbert Roth Prize was a prestigious award that annually recognized young volksmusik artists.

On 31 December 2011, Marilena won the Young Talent Award given out annually at Silvesterstadl, a special New Year's Eve edition of Musikantenstadl.

As of early 2018, Marilena's latest album is Hey DJ leg a Polka auf!, issued in the summer of 2014. A new album is in the works.

In 2019, after she graduated in Paderborn University with a degree in music, she started to work as a radio editor in Antenne Bayern de.

== Style ==
Marilena plays piano and guitar. Her role models are Stefanie Hertel and Helene Fischer.

== Discography ==
=== Albums ===
- 2011: Ich bin wie ich bin
- 2013: Lust auf's Leben
- 2014: Hey DJ leg a Polka auf!

=== Singles ===
- 2009: Der erste Kuss
- 2012: Bin ich noch Kind
- 2012: Dann macht es bumm-bumm-bumm
- 2013: Du bist mei Sommer
- 2021: Hey DJ, leg a Polka auf! (Kloß mit Soß Remix)
- 2022: Berghoamat
- 2023: Mambo (mit MaddaBrassKa)
