= List of number-one hits of 1982 (Germany) =

This is a list of the German Media Control Top100 Singles Chart number-ones of 1982.

Key
†	Indicates best-performing single and album of 1982

Issue date	Song	Artist	Album	Artist
4 January	"One of Us"	ABBA	"The Visitors"	ABBA
11 January	"Polonäse Blankenese"	Gottlieb Wendehals	"The Visitors"	ABBA
18 January	"Polonäse Blankenese"	Gottlieb Wendehals	"The Visitors"	ABBA
25 January	"Polonäse Blankenese"	Gottlieb Wendehals	"The Visitors"	ABBA
1 February	"Polonäse Blankenese"	Gottlieb Wendehals	"Classic Disco"	The Royal Philharmonic Orchestra
8 February	"Skandal im Sperrbezirk"	Spider Murphy Gang	"Ich will leben"	Peter Maffay
15 February	"Polonäse Blankenese"	Gottlieb Wendehals	"Berlin - A Concert For The People"	Barclay James Harvest
22 February	"Skandal im Sperrbezirk"	Spider Murphy Gang	"Ich will leben"	Peter Maffay
1 March	"Skandal im Sperrbezirk"	Spider Murphy Gang	"Berlin - A Concert For The People"	Barclay James Harvest
8 March	"Skandal im Sperrbezirk"	Spider Murphy Gang	"Ich will leben"	Peter Maffay
15 March	"Skandal im Sperrbezirk"	Spider Murphy Gang	"Dolce vita" †	Spider Murphy Gang
22 March	"Skandal im Sperrbezirk"	Spider Murphy Gang	"Dolce vita" †	Spider Murphy Gang
29 March	"Skandal im Sperrbezirk"	Spider Murphy Gang	"Dolce vita" †	Spider Murphy Gang
5 April	"Skandal im Sperrbezirk"	Spider Murphy Gang	"Dolce vita" †	Spider Murphy Gang
12 April	"Der Kommissar"	Falco	"Dolce vita" †	Spider Murphy Gang
19 April	"Ein bißchen Frieden"	Nicole	"Dolce vita" †	Spider Murphy Gang
26 April	"Der Kommissar"	Falco	"Olé España"	Michael Schanze und die Fußball-Nationalmannschaft WM '82
3 May	"Der Kommissar"	Falco	"Dolce vita" †	Spider Murphy Gang
10 May	"Ein bißchen Frieden"	Nicole	"Olé España"	Michael Schanze und die Fußball-Nationalmannschaft WM '82
17 May	"Ein bißchen Frieden"	Nicole	"Dolce vita" †	Spider Murphy Gang
24 May	"Ein bißchen Frieden"	Nicole	"85555"	Spliff
31 May	"Ein bißchen Frieden"	Nicole	"Eye in the Sky"	The Alan Parsons Project
7 June	"Ebony and Ivory"	Paul McCartney & Stevie Wonder	"Eye in the Sky"	The Alan Parsons Project
14 June	"Ebony and Ivory"	Paul McCartney & Stevie Wonder	"85555"	Spliff
21 June	"Ebony and Ivory"	Paul McCartney & Stevie Wonder	"Tug of War"	Paul McCartney
28 June	"Ebony and Ivory"	Paul McCartney & Stevie Wonder	"Tug of War"	Paul McCartney
5 July	"Ebony and Ivory"	Paul McCartney & Stevie Wonder	"Eye in the Sky"	The Alan Parsons Project
12 July	"Maid of Orleans (The Waltz Joan of Arc)" †	OMD	"85555"	Spliff
19 July	"Maid of Orleans (The Waltz Joan of Arc)" †	OMD	"Ein bißchen Frieden"	Nicole
26 July	"Maid of Orleans (The Waltz Joan of Arc)" †	OMD	"Ein bißchen Frieden"	Nicole
2 August	"Ich will Spaß"	Markus	"Ein bißchen Frieden"	Nicole
9 August	"Maid of Orleans (The Waltz Joan of Arc)" †	OMD	"Ein bißchen Frieden"	Nicole
16 August	"Ich will Spaß"	Markus	"Ein bißchen Frieden"	Nicole
23 August	"Adiós Amor"	Andy Borg	"Ein bißchen Frieden"	Nicole
30 August	"Adiós Amor"	Andy Borg	"Für usszeschnigge!"	BAP
6 September	"Adiós Amor"	Andy Borg	"Abracadabra"	Steve Miller Band
13 September	"Adiós Amor"	Andy Borg	"Vun drinne noh drusse"	BAP
20 September	"Adiós Amor"	Andy Borg	"Vun drinne noh drusse"	BAP
27 September	"Words"	F. R. David	"Vun drinne noh drusse"	BAP
4 October	"Words"	F. R. David	"Vun drinne noh drusse"	BAP
11 October	"Words"	F. R. David	"Vun drinne noh drusse"	BAP
18 October	"Words"	F. R. David	"Vun drinne noh drusse"	BAP
25 October	"Words"	F. R. David	"Vun drinne noh drusse"	BAP
1 November	"Words"	F. R. David	"Vun drinne noh drusse"	BAP
8 November	"Words"	F. R. David	"Vun drinne noh drusse"	BAP
15 November	"Words"	F. R. David	"Your Songs - Die große Edition seiner romantischen Welthits"	Elton John
22 November	"Words"	F. R. David	"Your Songs - Die große Edition seiner romantischen Welthits"	Elton John
29 November	"Words"	F. R. David	"Your Songs - Die große Edition seiner romantischen Welthits"	Elton John
6 December	"Words"	F. R. David	"Rock Classics"	Peter Hofmann
13 December	"Do You Really Want to Hurt Me"	Culture Club	"Rock Classics"	Peter Hofmann
20 December	"Do You Really Want to Hurt Me"	Culture Club	"Rock Classics"	Peter Hofmann
27 December	"Do You Really Want to Hurt Me"	Culture Club	"Rock Classics"	Peter Hofmann

== See also ==
- List of number-one hits (Germany)
