= Goodbye My Love =

Goodbye My Love may refer to:

- "Goodbye My Love" (James Brown song), a 1968 song written and recorded by James Brown
- "Goodbye My Love" (Ann Lewis song), a 1974 song recorded by Ann Lewis, later covered by various artists including Teresa Teng
- Goodbye My Love (TV series), a 1999 South Korean television drama series
- "Goodbye My Love”, a 1965 song recorded by The Searchers (original title "Goodbye My Lover Goodbye")
- "Goodbye My Love”, a 1995 song written by Yoko Ono from the album Rising

== See also ==
- "Goodbye, My Love, Goodbye", a 1973 song recorded by Demis Roussos
- "Island Love Songs: Goodbye My Love", a 1975 album recorded by Teresa Teng containing a cover of the 1974 song by Ann Lewis
- "Goodbye My Love, Goodbye", a 2006 Italian film also known as The Goodbye Kiss
- "Goodbye My Lover", a 2005 song recorded by James Blunt
- "Goodbye My Lover Goodbye", a 1963 song first recorded by Robert Mosely
- "Goodbye, My Lady Love", a 1900 song written by Joe Howard
- "Goodbye to Love", a 1972 song recorded by The Carpenters
- Adiós, amor mío (English: 'Goodbye my love'), telenovela
- Adiós Amor (disambiguation)
- Goodbye Love (disambiguation)
