= The Masked Singer (German TV series) season 13 =

The Masked Singer
- Season 13
- Starring: Verona Pooth; Chris Tall; Various guests
- Hosted by: Matthias Opdenhövel
- No. of contestants: 16
- Winner: Vincent Gross as "Fernando El Toro"
- Runner-up: Anna-Carina Woitschack as "Wild Thing"
- No. of episodes: 6

Release
- Original network: ProSieben
- Original release: 16 September – 21 October 2026

Season chronology
- ← Previous; Season 12

The thirteenth season of the German singing competition The Masked Singer premiered on 16 September 2026 on ProSieben.

== Panelists and host ==
Season 13 main panelists and host

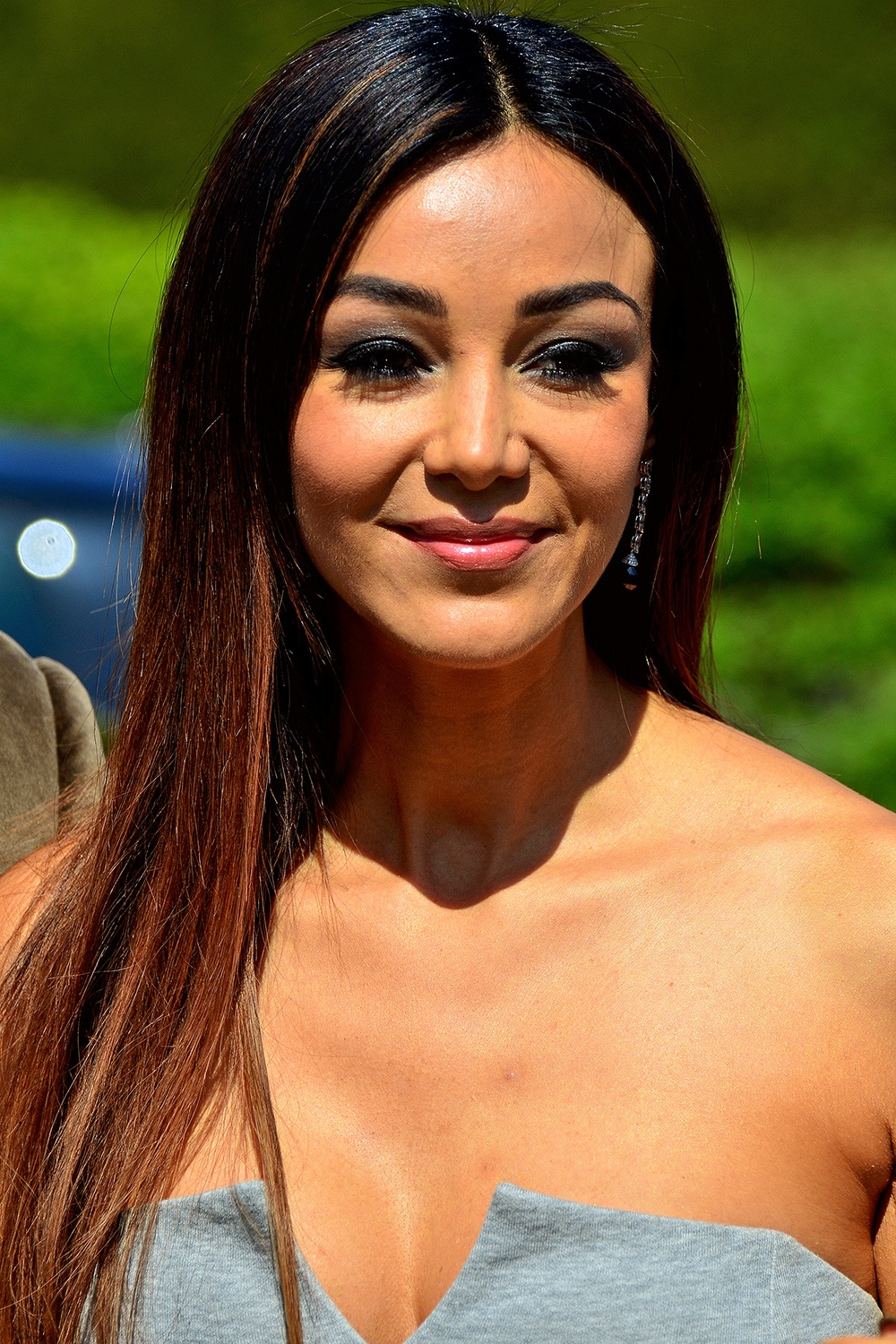
Verona Pooth

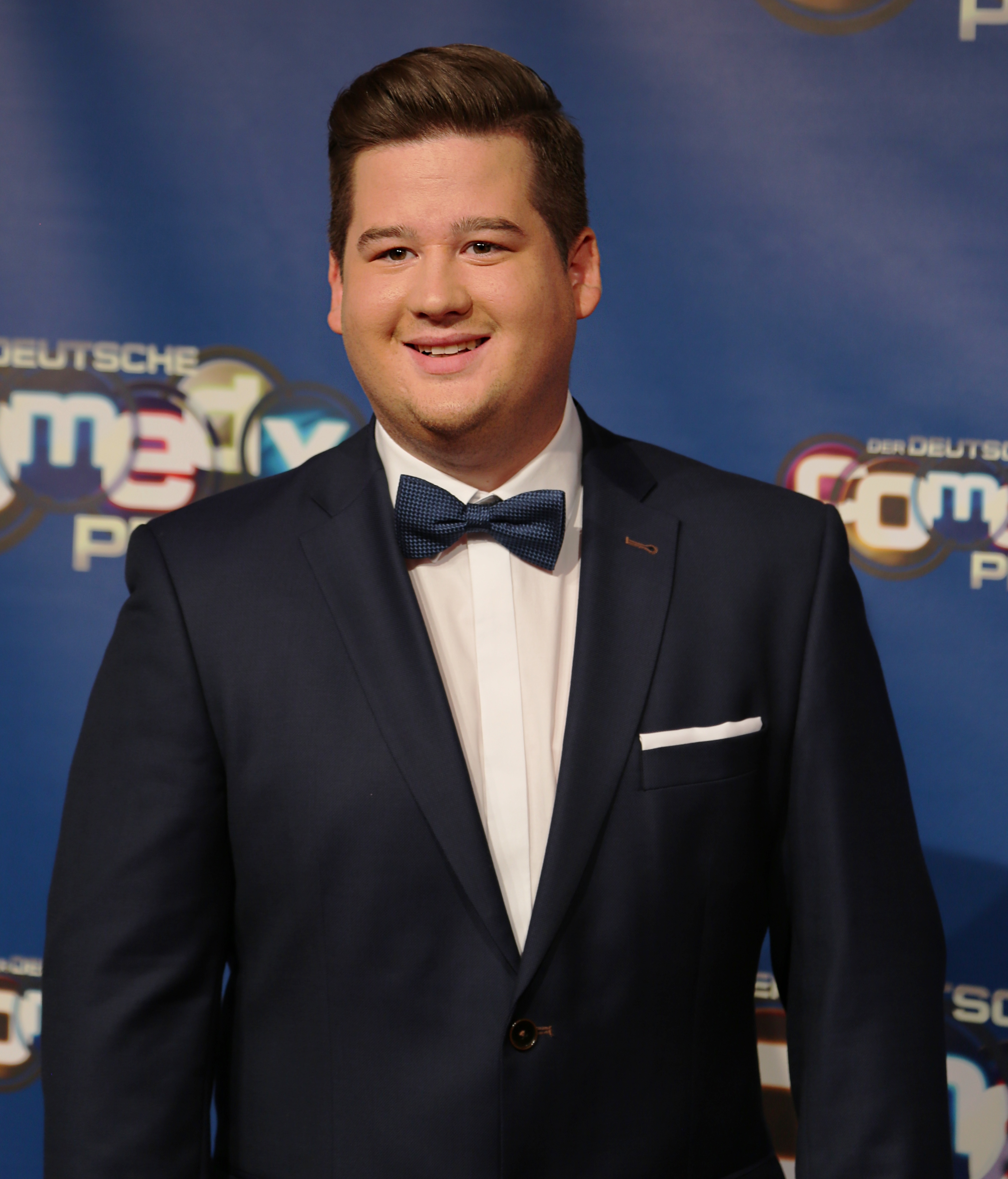
Chris Tall

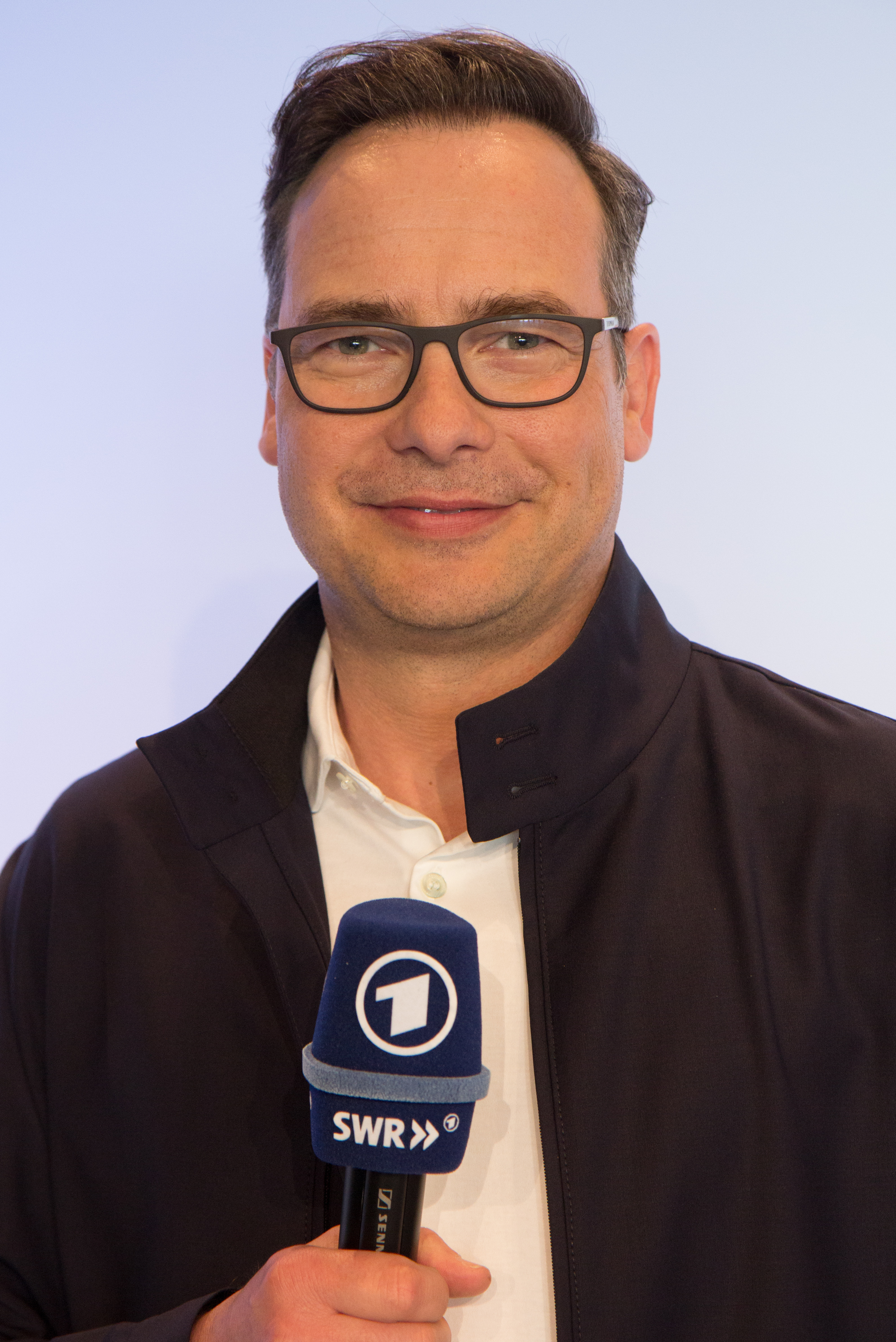
Matthias Opdenhövel

In this season, actress and TV host Verona Pooth, and comedian Chris Tall returned to the guessing panel. Matthias Opdenhövel returned for his thirteenth season as host.

=== Guest panelists ===
Various guest panelists appeared as the third judge in the judging panel for one episode. These guest panelists included:

Episode	Panelist		Guest Panelist
1	Verona Pooth	Chris Tall	The BossHoss
2	Verona Pooth	Chris Tall	Michi Beck
3	Verona Pooth	Chris Tall	Amira Aly
4	Verona Pooth	Chris Tall	Pietro Lombardi
5	Verona Pooth	Chris Tall	Eko Fresh
6	Verona Pooth	Chris Tall	Ruth Moschner

Season 13 guest panelists

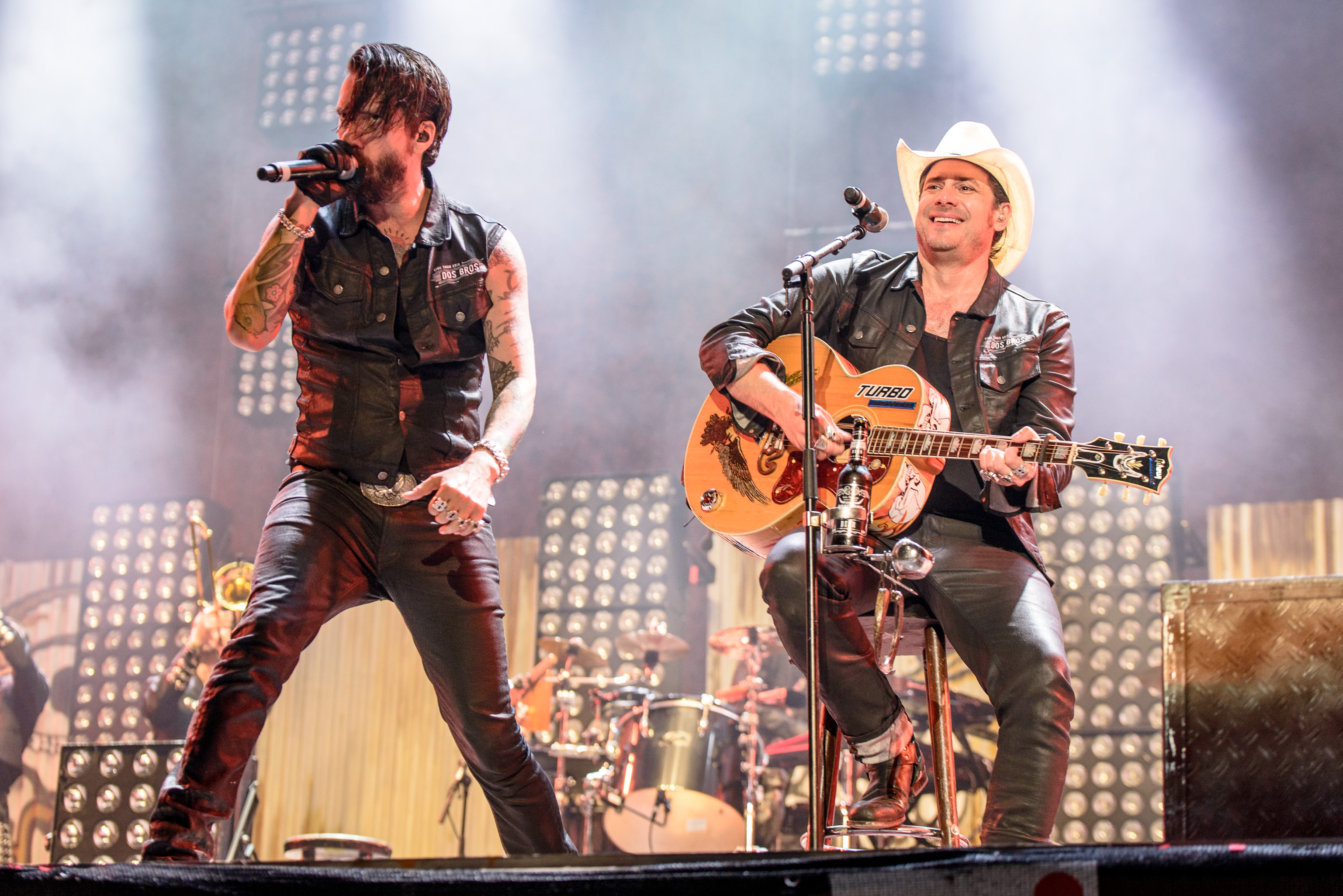
The BossHoss (episode 1)

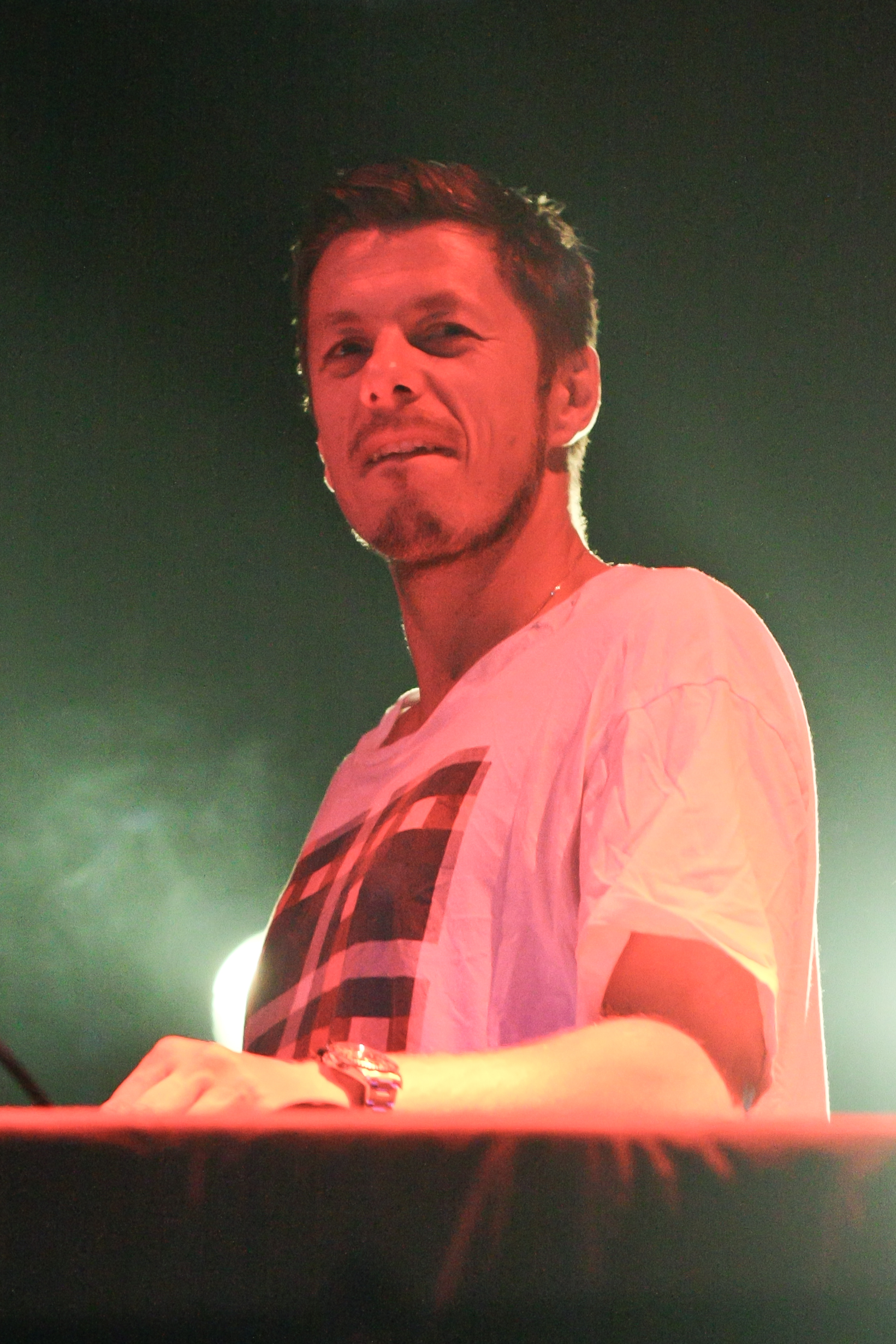
Michi Beck (episode 2)

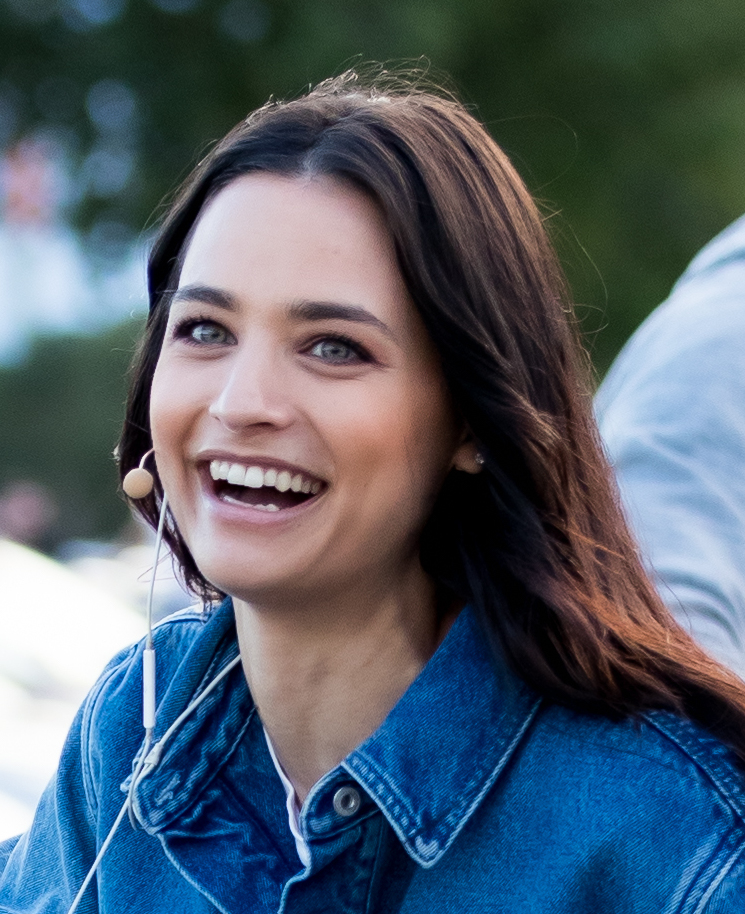
Amira Aly (episode 3)

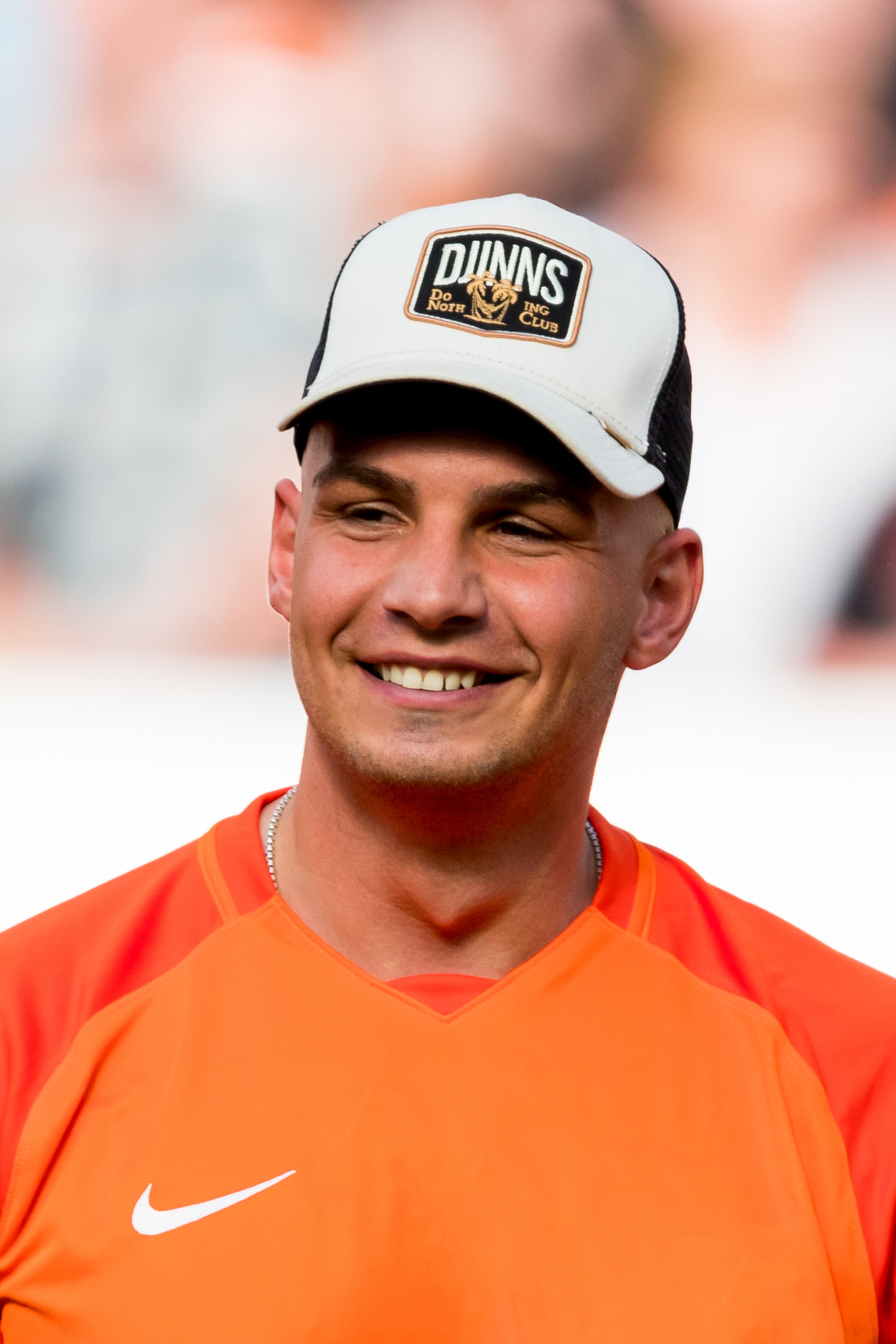
Pietro Lombardi (episode 4)

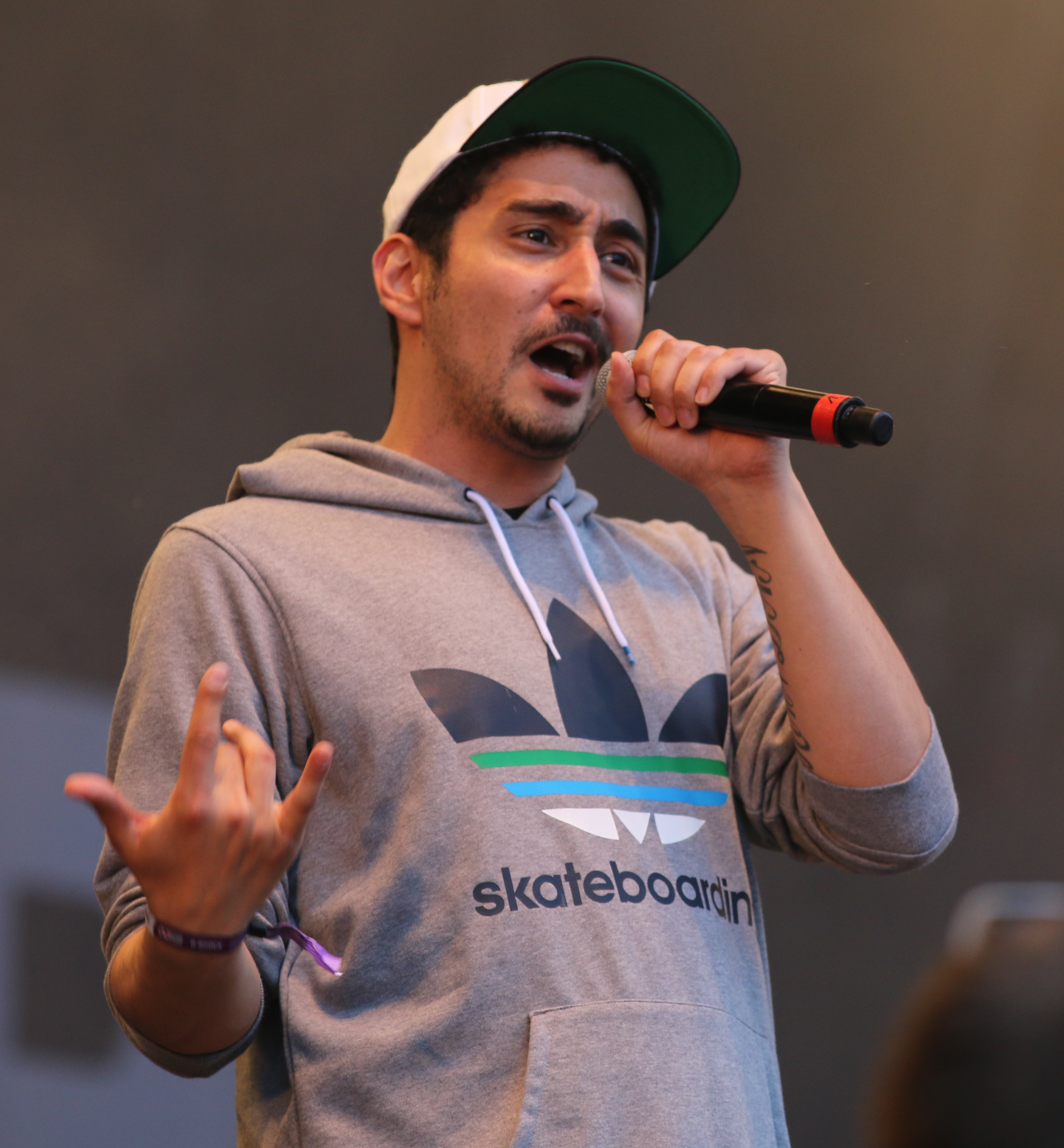
Eko Fresh (episode 5)

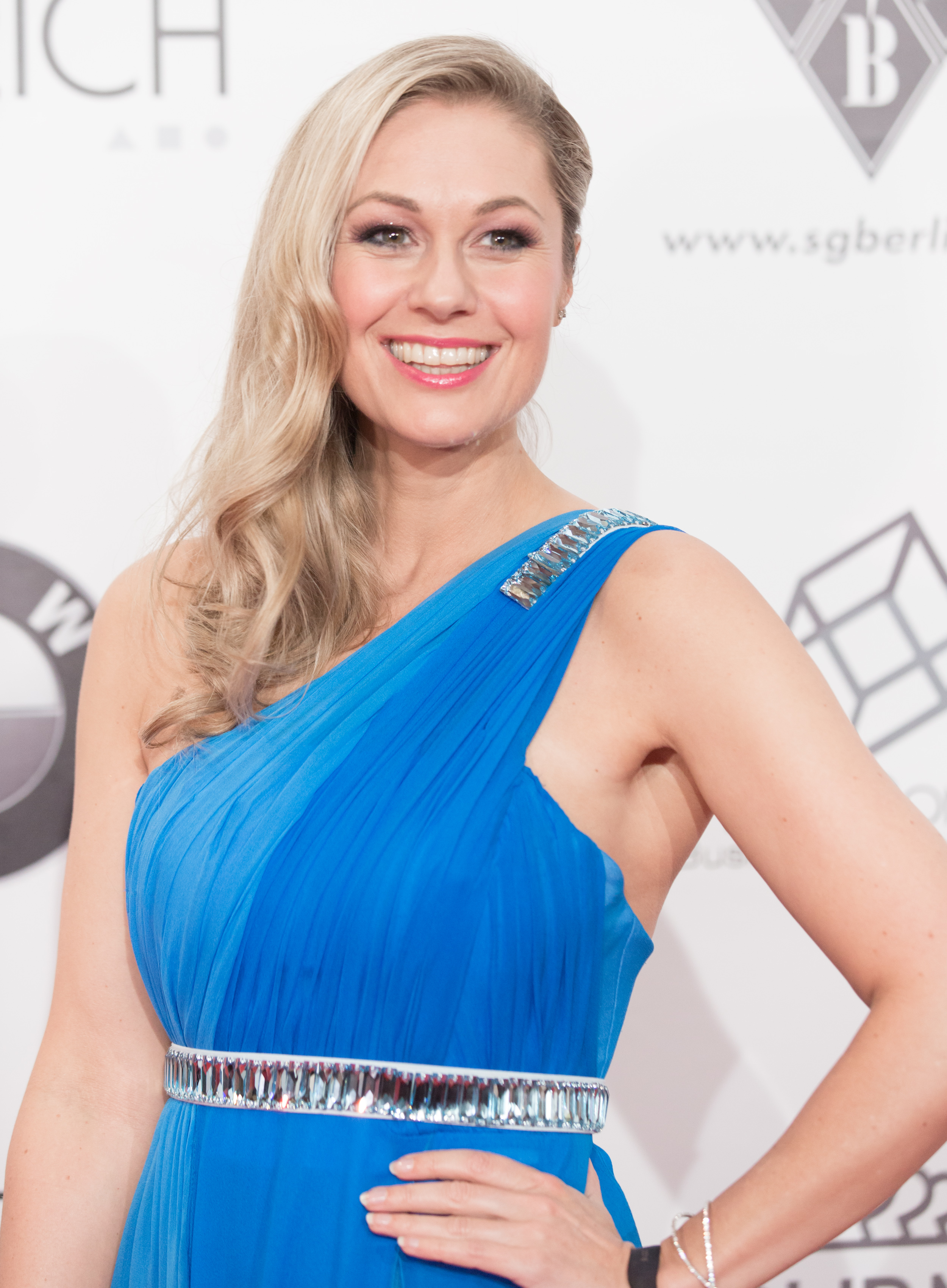
Ruth Moschner (episode 6)

== Contestants ==
The season features 16 contestants, which is the most contestants for a season since the seasons before had no more than 10 contestants.

Results
Stage name	Celebrity	Notability	Episodes										
Stage name	Celebrity	Notability	1		2		3		4		5	6	
Stage name	Celebrity	Notability	A		B		C		D		5	A	B
Fernando El Toro	Vincent Gross	Singer							SAFE	SAFE	WIN	SAFE	WINNER
Wild Thing	Anna-Carina Woitschack	Singer							SAFE	SAFE	WIN	SAFE	RUNNER-UP
P.S. "H.P."	Joey Heindle	Singer					SAFE	SAFE			WIN	SAFE	THIRD
Professor Dr. Dr. Schweinstein	Jasmin Schwiers	Actress	SAFE	SAFE							RISK	OUT	
Yeti Cat	Gisa Flake	Actress/Singer					SAFE	SAFE			WIN	OUT	
Mr. Mic	Ronan Keating	Singer			SAFE	SAFE					OUT		
Momo	Guido Cantz	TV Presenter/Comedian	RISK	SAFE							OUT		
Erdbär "Strawbeary"	Isi Glück	Singer			RISK	SAFE					OUT		
Groovy	Bastian Bielendorfer	Author/Comedian							RISK	OUT			
Three Sixty	Ruth Moschner	Actress/TV Presenter							OUT				
Cosma	Evelyn Burdecki	Reality TV star					SAFE	OUT					
Luigi Eishörnchen "Luigi Ice Cream Cone"	Mathias Mester	Athlete					OUT						
Perla "Pearl"	Prince Damien	Singer			SAFE	OUT							
Hippo Jones	Stefan Mross	Singer/TV Presenter			OUT								
Bubble	Ben Zucker	Singer	SAFE	OUT									
Emily Wau	Isabel Edvardsson	Dancer	OUT										

The masked singer won their face-off and remained in the competition.
The masked singer was safe from elimination.
The masked singer was in the bottom two, but was not eliminated.
The masked singer was eliminated from the competition and unmasked upon their elimination.
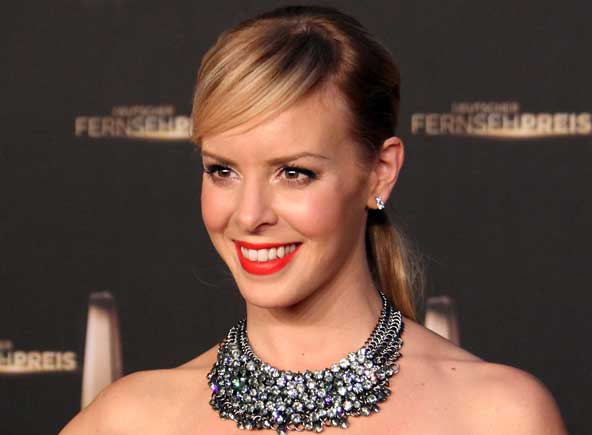
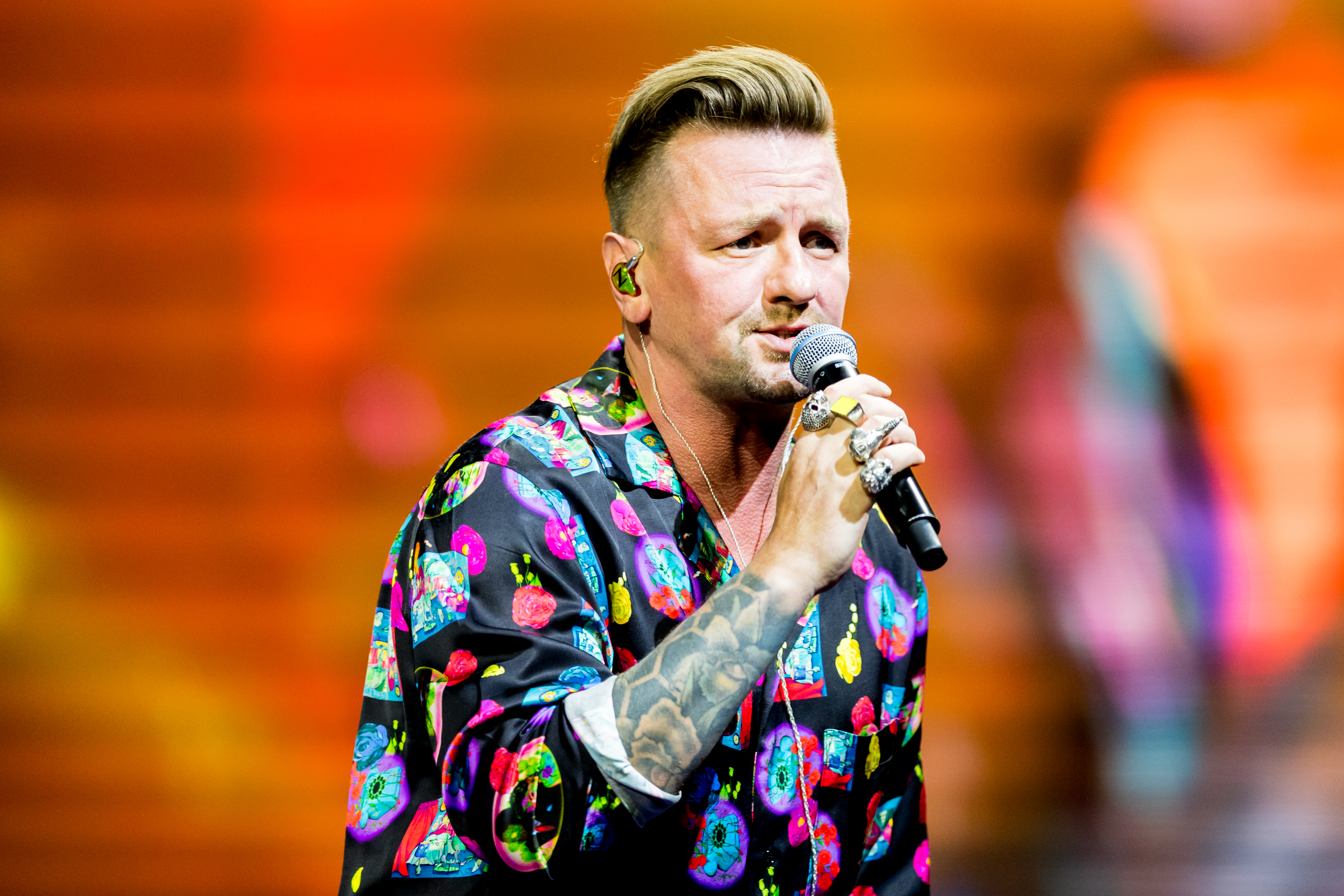
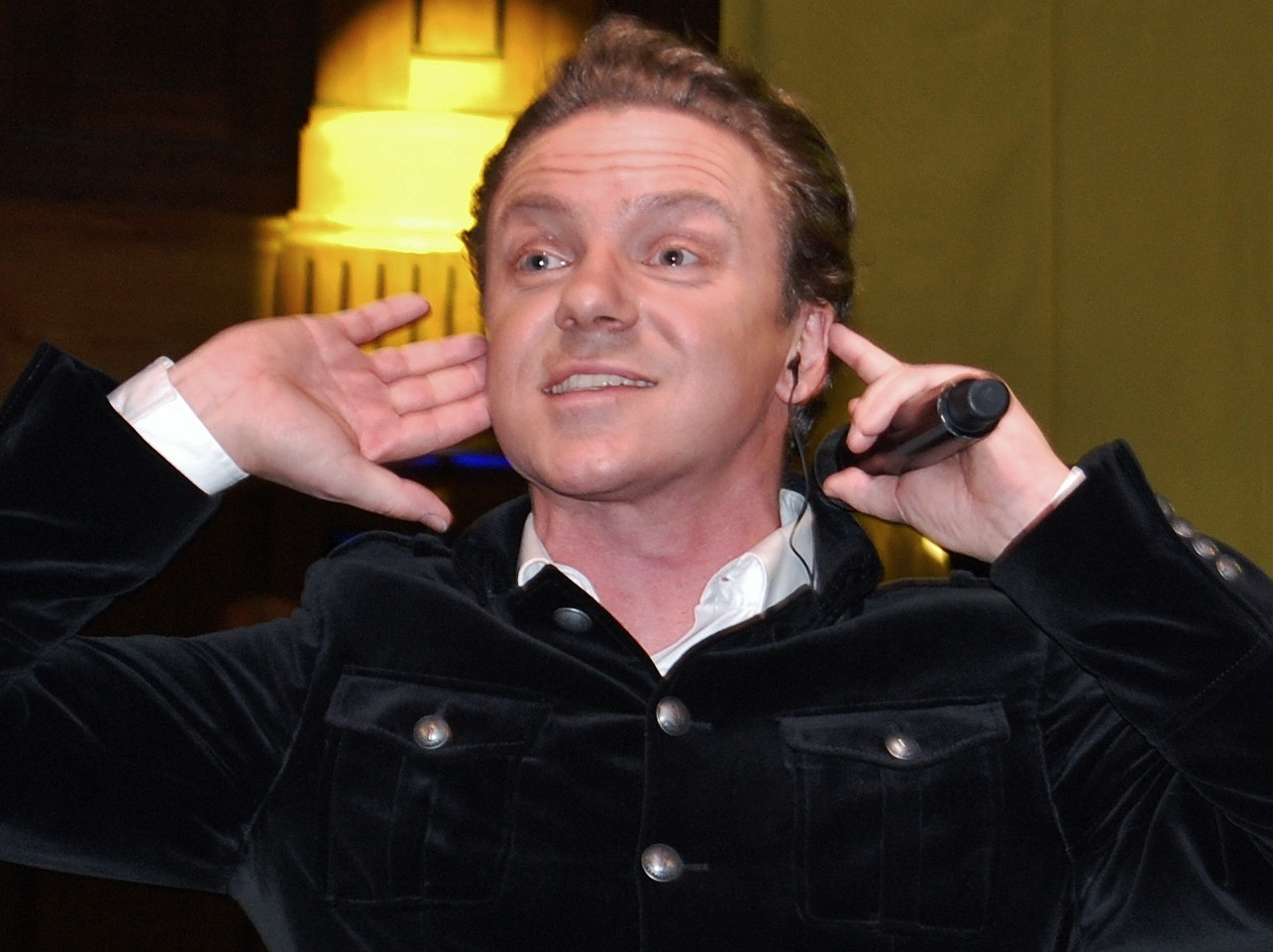
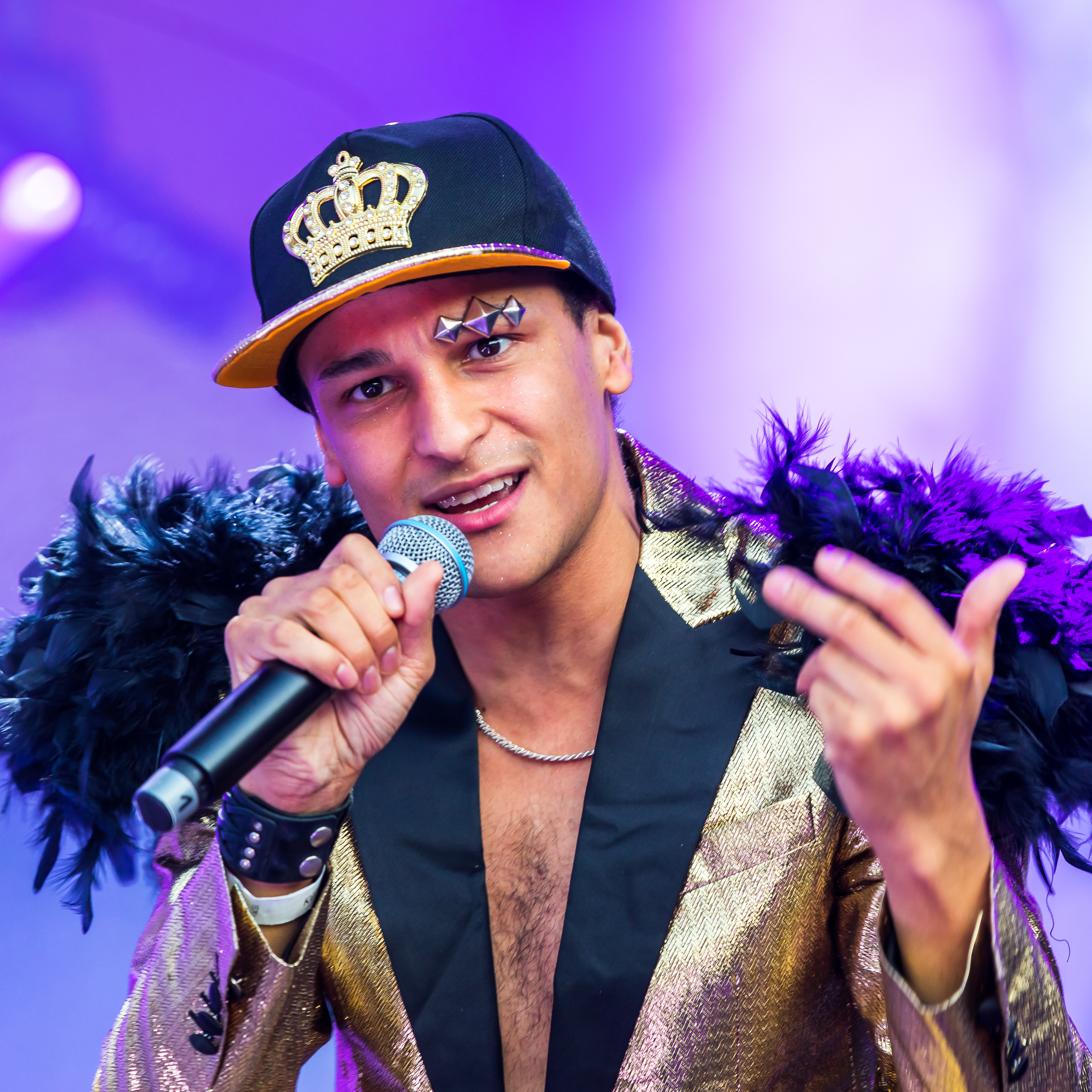
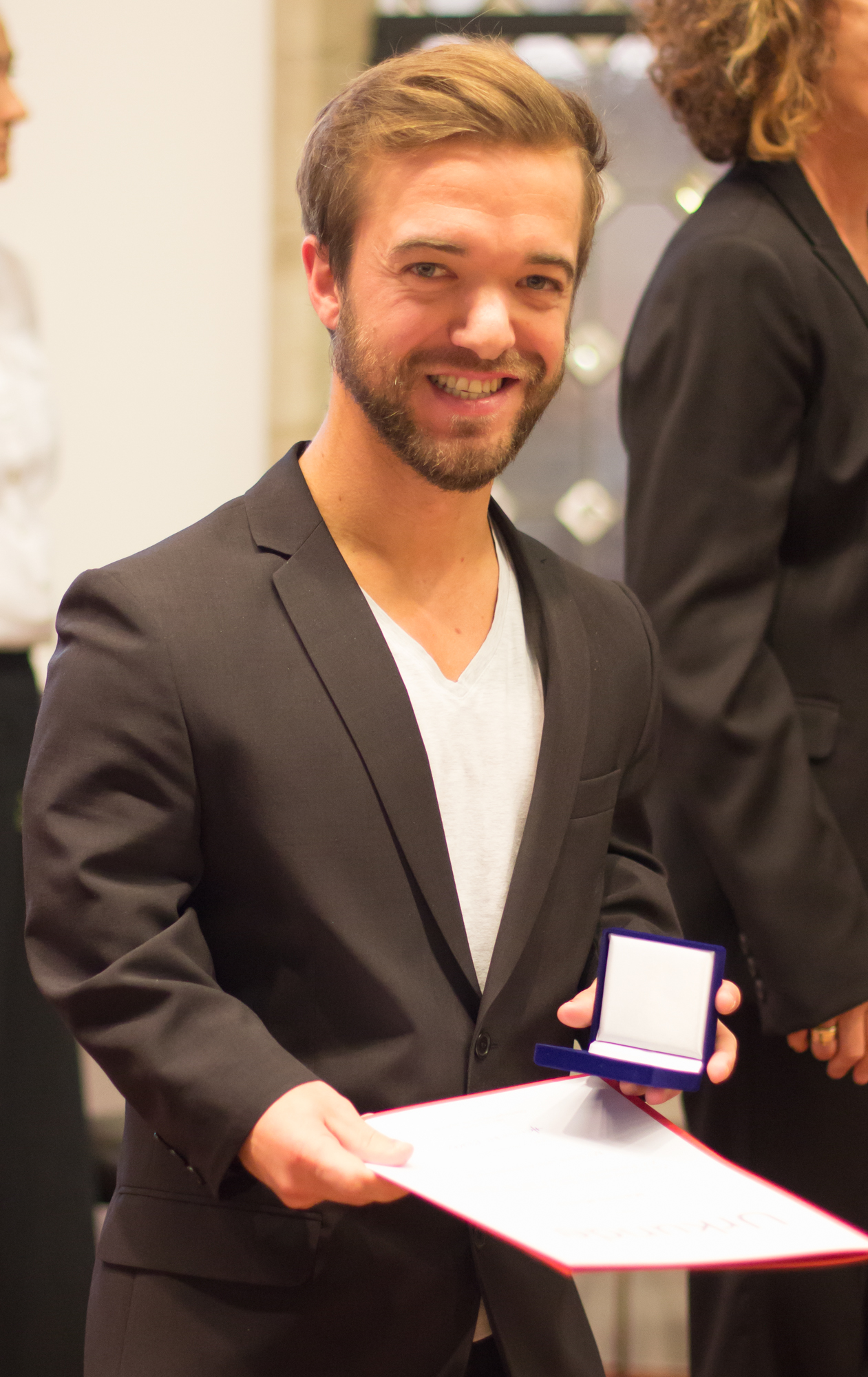
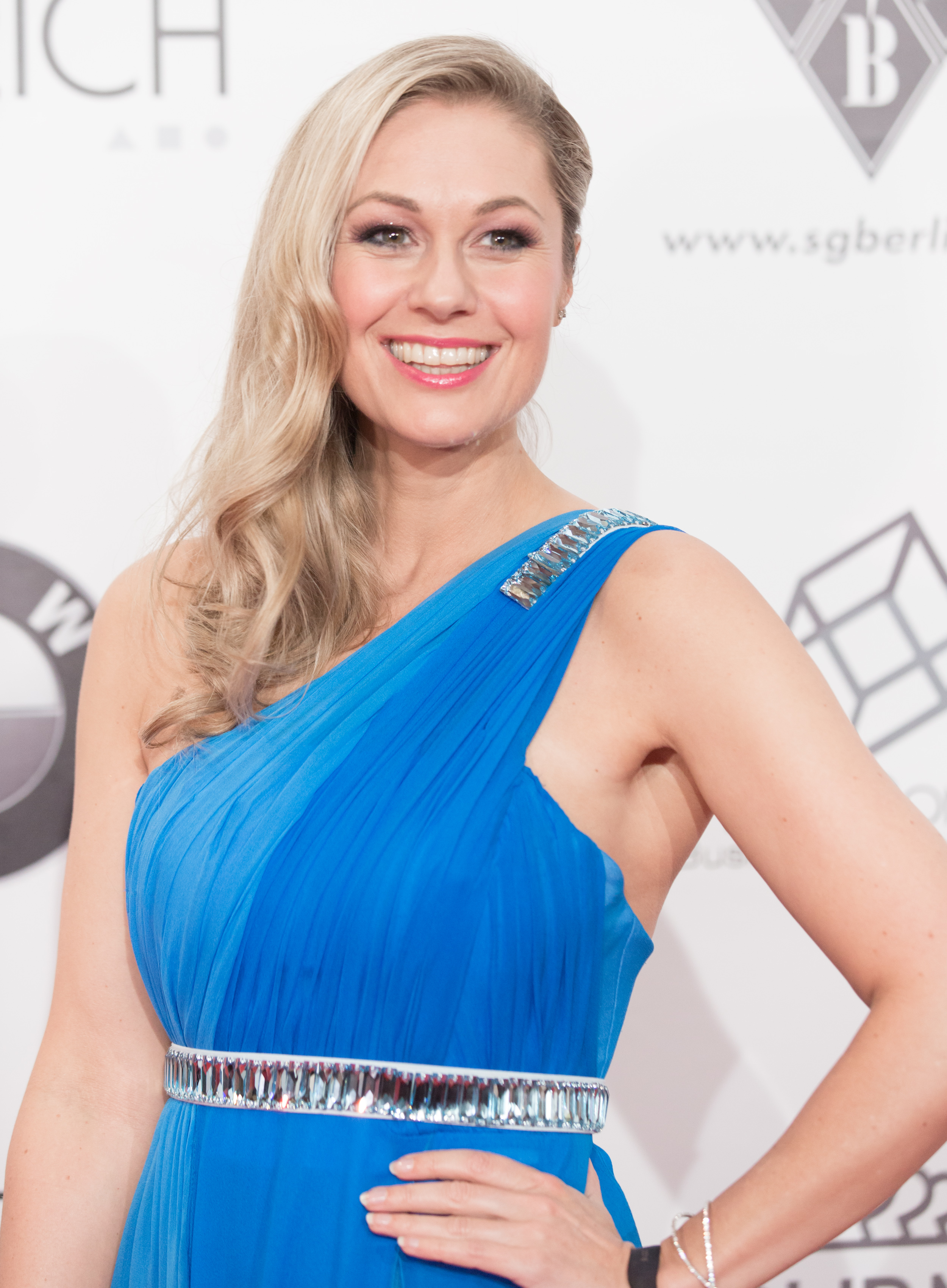
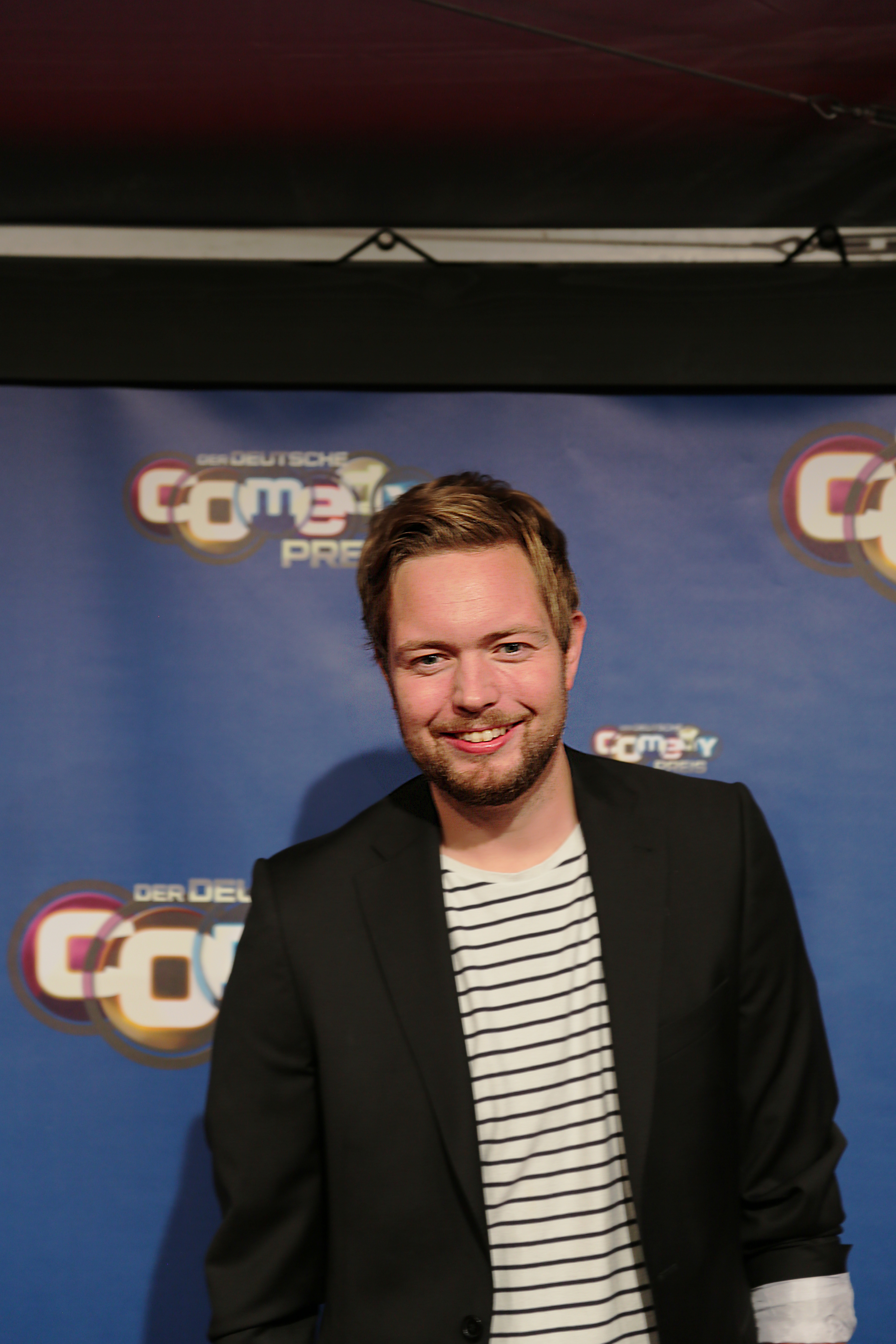
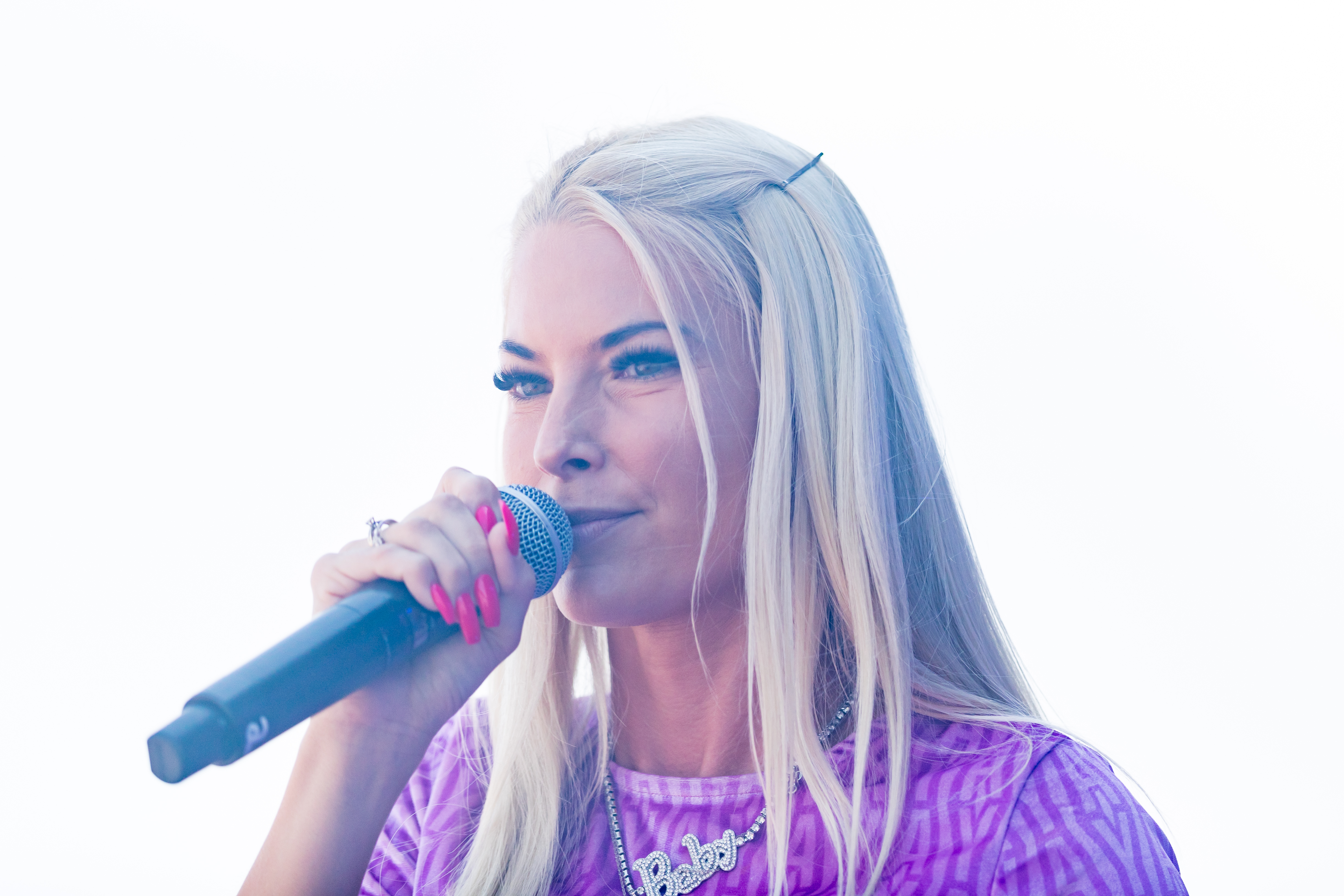
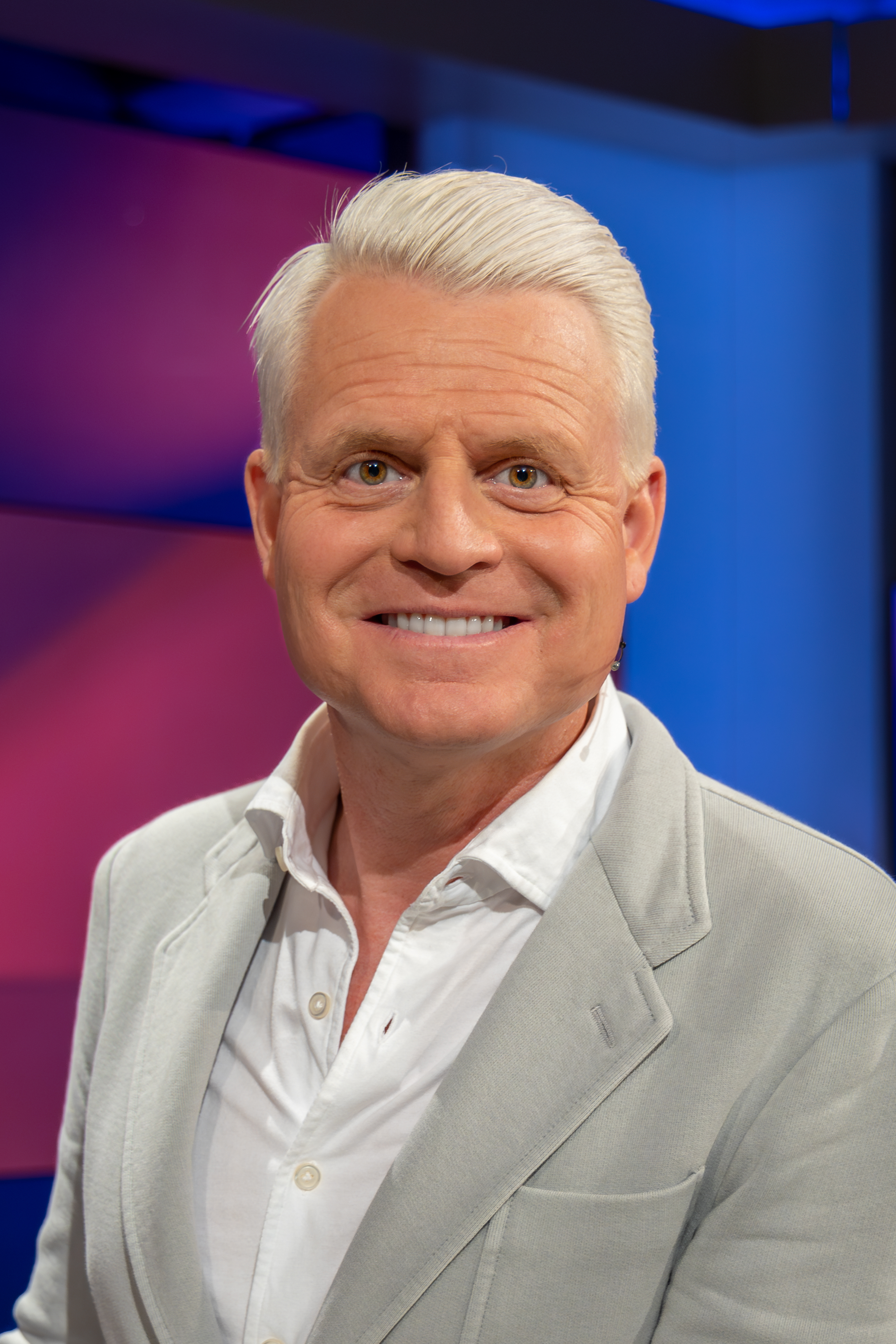
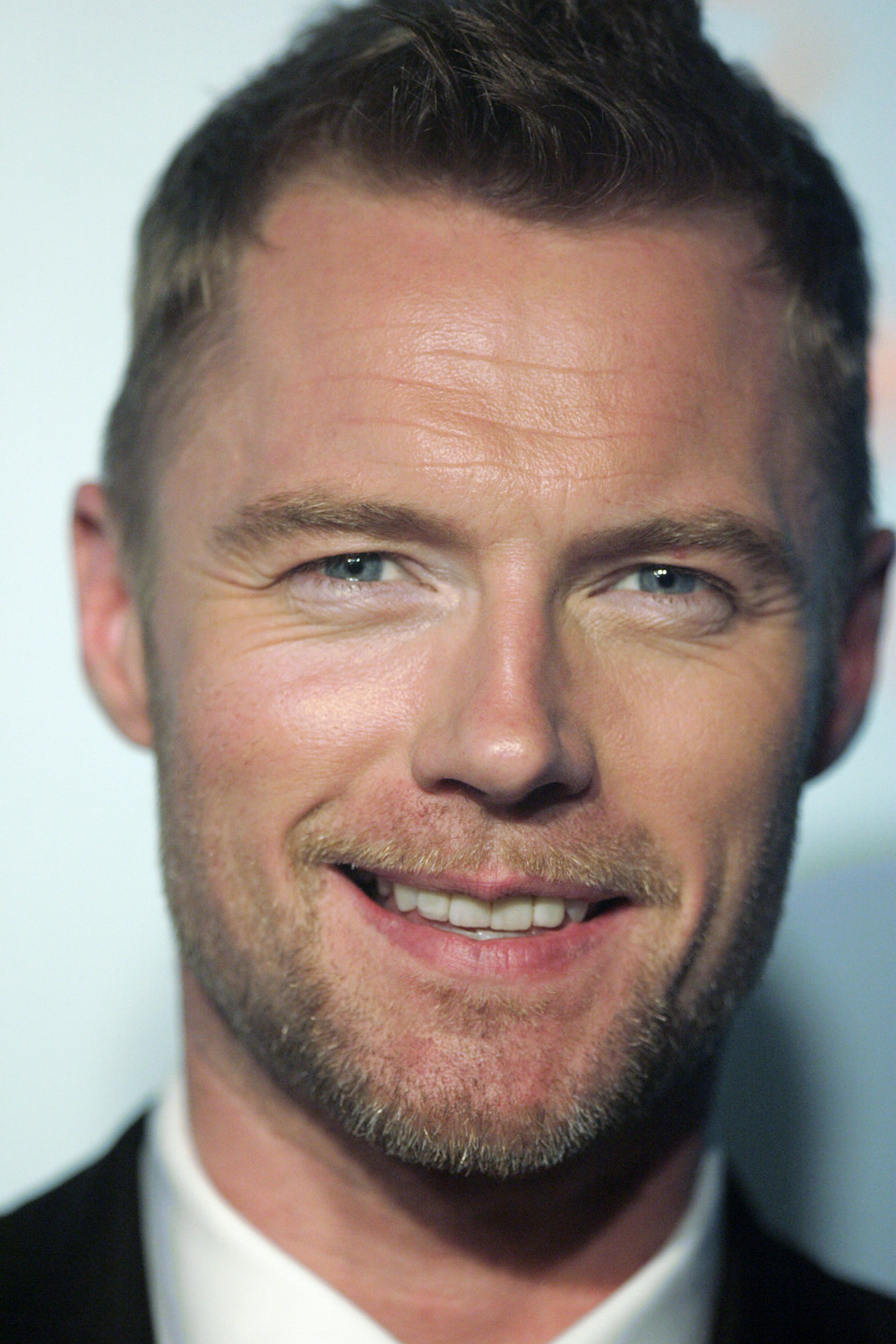
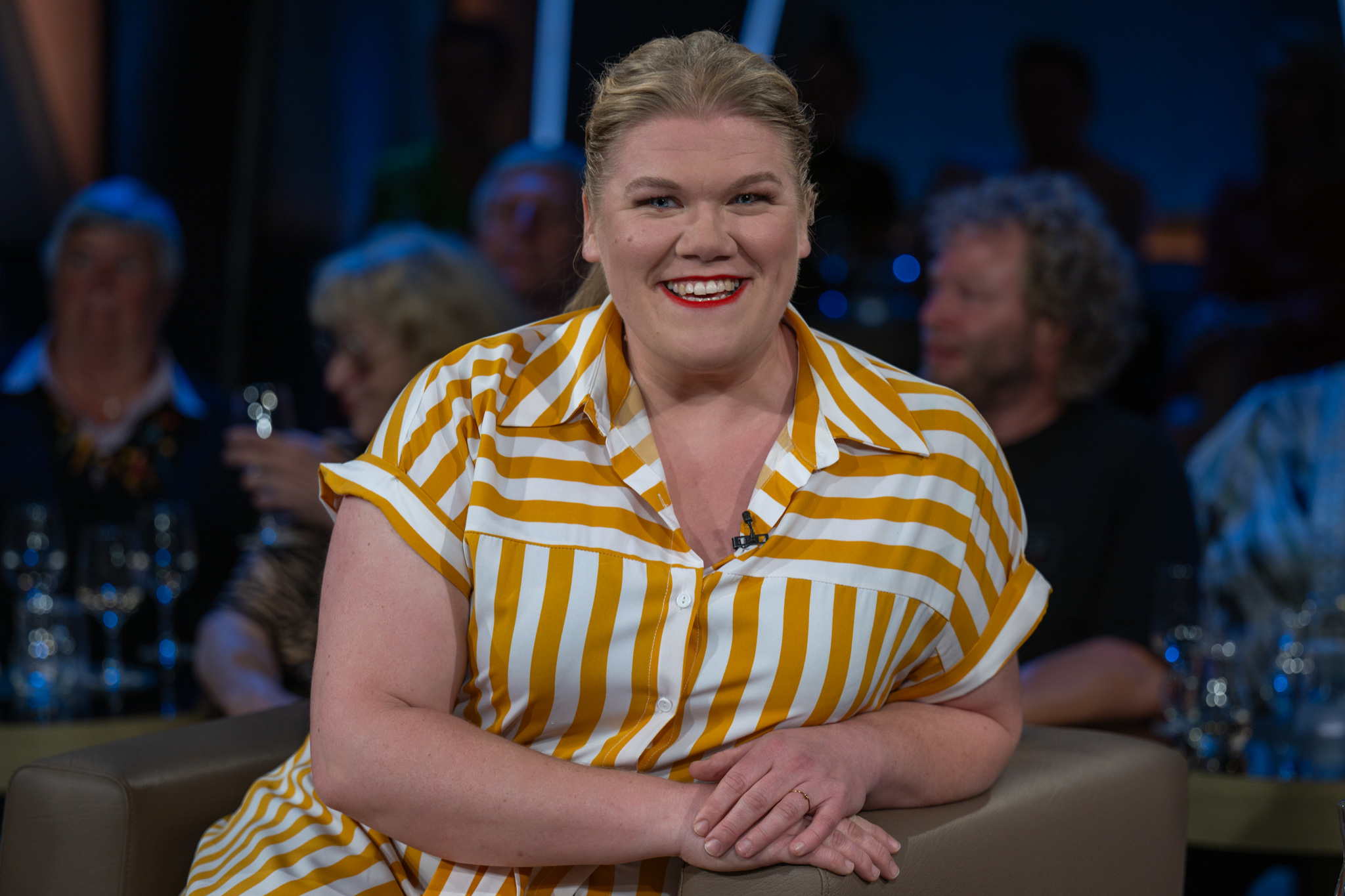
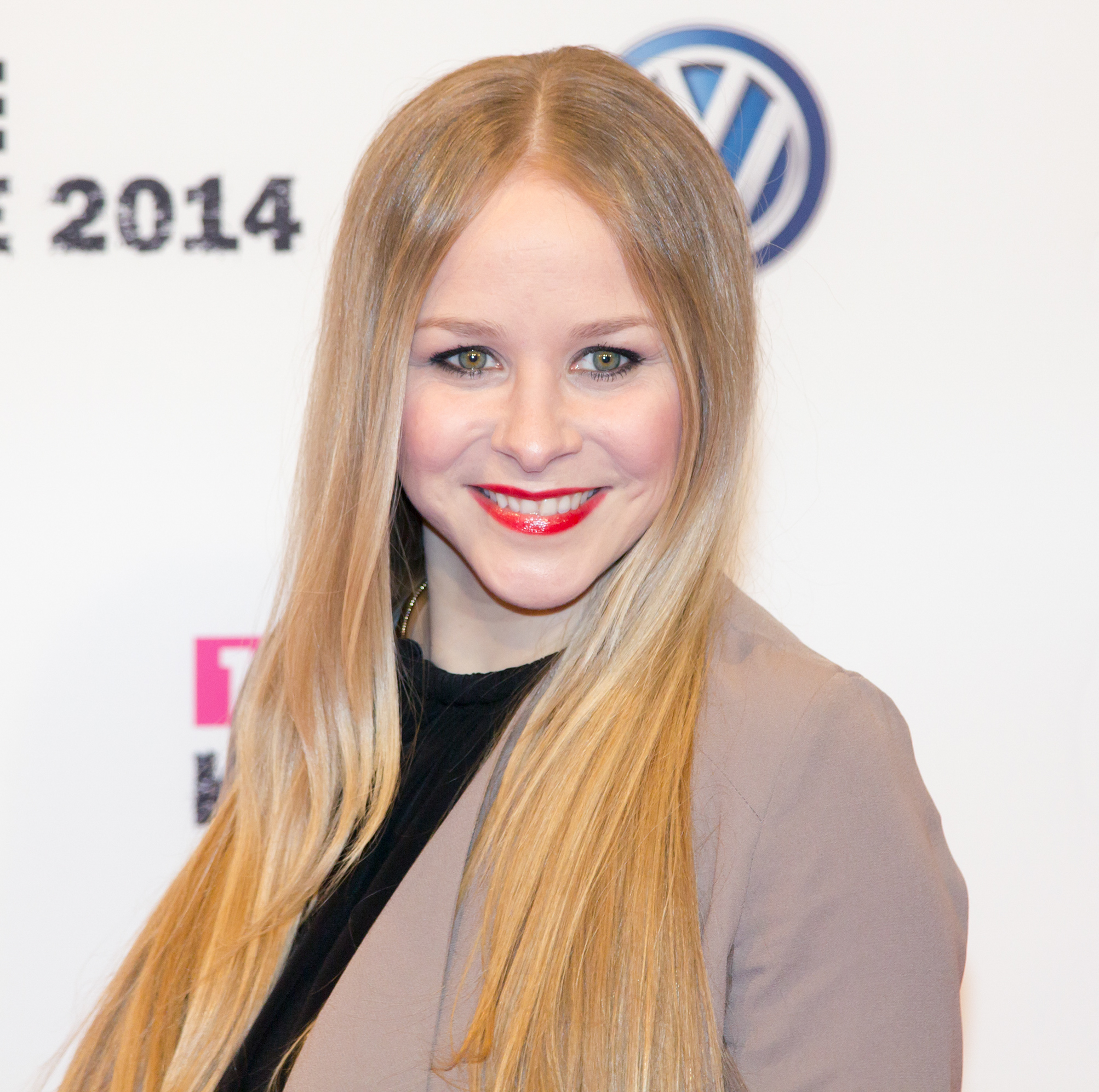
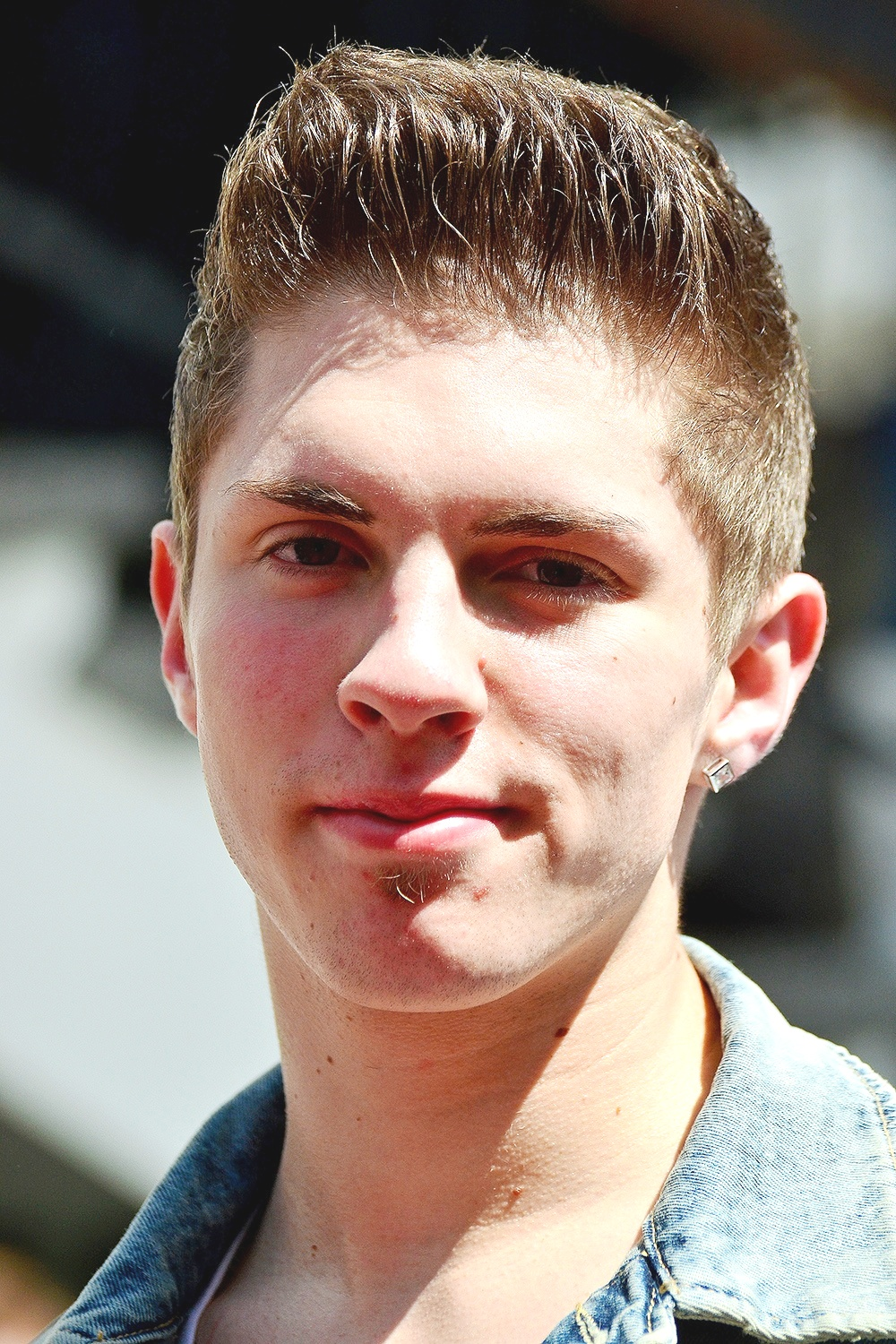
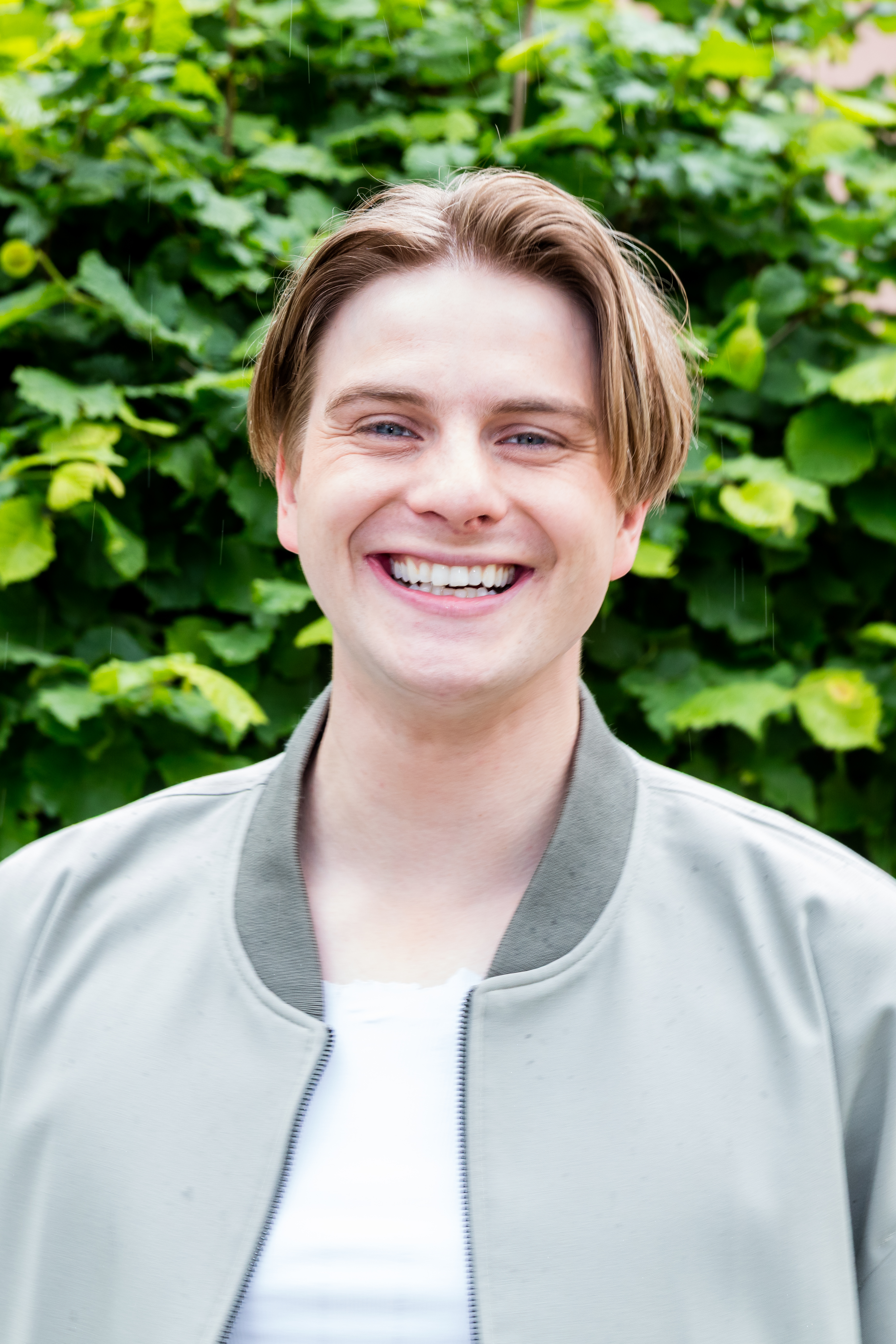
The celebrities who have competed in thirteenth season of The Masked Singer, pictured in order of elimination (l-r):
Isabel Edvardsson ("Emily Wau"), Ben Zucker ("Bubble"), Stefan Mross ("Hippo Jones"), Prince Damien ("Perla"), Mathias Mester ("Luigi Eishörnchen"), Evelyn Burdecki ("Cosma"), Ruth Moschner ("Three Sixty"), Bastian Bielendorfer ("Groovy"), Isi Glück ("Erdbär"), Guido Cantz ("Momo"), Ronan Keating ("Mr. Mic"), Gisa Flake ("Yeti Cat"), Jasmin Schwiers ("Professor Dr. Dr. Schweinstein"), Joey Heindle ("P.S."), Anna-Carina Woitschack ("Wild Thing"), and Vincent Gross ("Fernando El Toro")

== Episodes ==
=== Week 1 (16 September) ===
- Theme: Dancefloor

Performances on the first live episode
#	Stage name	Song	Identity	Result
1	Professor Dr. Dr. Schweinstein	"I Am What I Am" by Gloria Gaynor	undisclosed	SAFE
2	Momo	"Blinded by the Light" by Manfred Mann	undisclosed	RISK
3	Bubble	"Bangaranga" by DARA	undisclosed	SAFE
4	Emily Wau	"Material Girl" by Madonna	Isabel Edvardsson	OUT
Sing-off details			Identity	Result
1	Momo	"Boogie Wonderland" by Earth, Wind & Fire & The Emotions	undisclosed	SAFE
2	Professor Dr. Dr. Schweinstein	"Toxic" by Britney Spears	undisclosed	SAFE
3	Bubble	"Cake by the Ocean" by DNCE	Ben Zucker	OUT

=== Week 2 (23 September) ===
- Theme: Movie Songs

Performances on the second live episode
#	Stage name	Song	Identity	Result
1	Erdbär	"Mamma Mia" from Mamma Mia!	undisclosed	RISK
2	Mr. Mic	"When You Say Nothing at All" from Notting Hill	undisclosed	SAFE
3	Hippo Jones	"Medley" from Pulp Fiction	Stefan Mross	OUT
4	Perla	"I Have Nothing" from The Bodyguard	undisclosed	SAFE
Sing-off details			Identity	Result
1	Erdbär	"Car Wash" from Shark Tale	undisclosed	SAFE
2	Perla	"Golden" from KPop Demon Hunters	Prince Damien	OUT
3	Mr. Mic	"Love Is All Around" from Four Weddings and a Funeral	undisclosed	SAFE

=== Week 3 (30 September) ===
- Theme: Stadium Anthems

Performances on the third live episode
#	Stage name	Song	Identity	Result
1	P.S.	"Don't Stop Believin'" by Journey	undisclosed	SAFE
2	Cosma	"Freed from Desire" by Gala	undisclosed	SAFE
3	Yeti Cat	"Rise Like a Phoenix" by Conchita Wurst	undisclosed	SAFE
4	Luigi Eishörnchen	"Bello e impossibile" by Gianna Nannini	Mathias Mester	OUT
Sing-off details			Identity	Result
1	P.S.	"Numb" by Linkin Park feat. Jay-Z	undisclosed	SAFE
2	Cosma	"A Sky Full of Stars" by Coldplay	Evelyn Burdecki	OUT
3	Yeti Cat	"Livin' on a Prayer" by Bon Jovi	undisclosed	SAFE

=== Week 4 (7 October) ===
- Theme: Festival

Performances on the fourth live episode
#	Stage name	Song	Identity	Result
1	Fernando El Toro	"Everybody (Backstreet's Back)" by Backstreet Boys	undisclosed	SAFE
2	Groovy	"That's the Way (I Like It)" by KC and the Sunshine Band	undisclosed	RISK
3	Wild Thing	"Cryin'" by Aerosmith	undisclosed	SAFE
4	Three Sixty	"Hard out Here" by Lily Allen	Ruth Moschner	OUT
Sing-off details			Identity	Result
1	Fernando El Toro	"Tage wie diese" by Die Toten Hosen	undisclosed	SAFE
2	Groovy	"Narcotic" by Liquido	Bastian Bielendorfer	OUT
3	Wild Thing	"Use Somebody" by Kings of Leon	undisclosed	SAFE

=== Week 5 (14 October) ===
Performances on the fifth live episode
#	Stage name	Song	Identity	Result
1	Professor Dr. Dr. Schweinstein	"Don't Stop Me Now" by Queen	undisclosed	RISK
2	P.S.	"Iris" by Goo Goo Dolls	undisclosed	WIN
3	Erdbär	"Upside Down" by Diana Ross	Isi Glück	OUT
4	Fernando El Toro	"Hero" by Enrique Iglesias	undisclosed	WIN
5	Yeti Cat	"Running Up That Hill" by Kate Bush	undisclosed	WIN
6	Momo	"Moves like Jagger" by Maroon 5 feat. Christina Aguilera	Guido Cantz	OUT
7	Wild Thing	"Try" by P!nk	undisclosed	WIN
8	Mr. Mic	"Faith" by George Michael	Ronan Keating	OUT

=== Week 6 (21 October) – Final ===
==== Round One ====
Performances on the final live episode – round one
#	Stage name	Song	Identity	Result
1	Yeti Cat	"Let It Go" from Frozen	Gisa Flake	OUT
2	P.S.	"Yellow" by Coldplay	undisclosed	SAFE
3	Fernando El Toro	"Y.M.C.A." by Village People	undisclosed	SAFE
4	Professor Dr. Dr. Schweinstein	"The Story" by Brandi Carlile	Jasmin Schwiers	OUT
5	Wild Thing	"Black Velvet" by Alannah Myles	undisclosed	SAFE

==== Round Two ====
Performances on the final live episode – round two
#	Stage name	Song	Identity	Result
1	P.S.	"Numb" by Linkin Park feat. Jay-Z	Joey Heindle	THIRD
2	Fernando El Toro	"Everybody (Backstreet's Back)" by Backstreet Boys	Vincent Gross	WINNER
3	Wild Thing	"Cryin'" by Aerosmith	Anna-Carina Woitschack	RUNNER-UP

- Before the winner unmasked, the previous winner, Meltem Kaptan sings: "I Was Made for Lovin' You" by Kiss

== Reception ==
=== Ratings ===
Episode	Original airdate	Timeslot	Viewers (in millions)		Share (in %)		Source
Episode	Original airdate	Timeslot	Household	Adults 14–49	Household	Adults 14–49	Source
1	16 September 2026	Wednesday 8:15 pm	1.07	0.23	6.0%	7.5%	
2	23 September 2026	Wednesday 8:15 pm	0.84	0.25	4.7%	8.6%	
3	30 September 2026	Wednesday 8:15 pm	0.89	0.16	5.1%	5.7%	
4	7 October 2026	Wednesday 8:15 pm	0.82	0.18	4.5%	5.8%	
5	14 October 2026	Wednesday 8:15 pm	0.85	0.19	5.1%	7.1%	
6	21 October 2026	Wednesday 8:15 pm	1.22	0.26	6.9%	8.8%	
Average			0.95	0.21	5.38%	7.25%	
