= Musikantenstadl =

- Genre: Volksmusik, Schlager
- Directed by: Kurt Palmer
- Presented by: Karl Moik (1981–2005); Andy Borg (2006–2015)
- Opening theme: Trumpet-Echo; 1981–2006; Stadlzeit; 2006–
- Country of origin: Austria
- Original language: German
- No. of episodes: 210 (as 15 December 2020)

Production
- Production locations: Austria; Germany; Switzerland
- Running time: 2 hours 15 minutes (Musikantenstadl); 3 hours 45 minutes (Silvesterstadl)
- Production companies: Österreichischer Rundfunk; Bayerischer Rundfunk; Schweizer Radio und Fernsehen

Original release
- Release: 5 March 1981 – 31 December 2023

Musikantenstadl was a live television entertainment program broadcast in the German language throughout Austria, Germany, and Switzerland. It features Austrian, Swiss, and German popular folk music (Schlager, Volkstümliche Musik), international pop and folk music as well as interviews and comedy. As a production of Eurovision, is co-produced by the Österreichischer Rundfunk, Bayerischer Rundfunk and Schweizer Radio und Fernsehen. Aside from the live television broadcasts it also tours in Austria and Germany as live concerts. It is currently hosted by Andy Borg and its location of broadcast varies between towns in different regions in Austria, Germany, and Switzerland.

The show could be compared to being a much larger German version of the United Kingdom 1970's entertainment show The Wheeltappers and Shunters Social Club. However Musikantenstadl consists of a large barn Set construction and not a Social Club. The show also has similarities to Noel's House Party.

In 2015, the show was re-branded as the Stadlshow with new stage setting and presenter team, Francine Jordi and Alexander Mazza. Musikantenstadl and Stadlshow are both used conjunctively when referring to the program.

== Format ==
The show takes its name from "Musikanten" meaning musicians and "Stadl" which is the Austrian-Bavarian word for barn. The first Musikantenstadl was broadcast in Enns Austria and mainly consists of easy listening, catchy music (Schlager and Volkstümliche Musik) and conversations between the presenter, musicians and members of the audience. Each episode which is referred to as a Stadl is broadcast from different locations in either Austria, Switzerland, Germany and sometimes South Tyrol in front of a live audience at a large city or small town arena. The audience members sit at long tables in a German beer house style and are served drinks from a bar. Most also arrive to the show wearing Tracht including Lederhosen and Dirndls. There have been two set backdrops since 1981; in 2005 a new set was introduced along with the new presenter Andy Borg which included a staircase. Since the start, the Wolfgang-Lindner Band from Austria has provided the music which the artists sing and audience members dance to. When the original band leader, Wolfgang Lindner Sr., died, his son, Wolfgang Lindner Jr., took his place and now plays drums in the band. In 2005 the original theme music Trumpet Echo was replaced with the new Stadlzeit which also includes words which are sung by Andy Borg at the opening and closing of each show.

== Special editions ==
=== Silvesterstadl ===
Every year on 31 December, a 5-hour New Year's Eve special of the show Silvesterstadl is broadcast live throughout Germany, Austria and Switzerland leading up to the midnight countdown. The first Silvesterstadl was broadcast in 1984 and became an annual program as of 1989. In 2005 Karl Moik presented his last Silvesterstadl. The stadl special features a 'kiss-cam' whereby camera crew select couples throughout the night from the audience who then give each other a New Year's Eve kiss on TV. Throughout the program viewers also call in to vote who they want to win 'Stadlstern' (Barn star) of that year.

=== Overseas broadcasts ===
Musikantenstadl has been broadcast live from several non-German speaking countries. In August 1985, the show featured its first overseas broadcast live in Portorož, part of the then state of Yugoslavia. It was also the first time the show featured as an open-air concert, live from the Adriatic sea side resort.

In September 1988 with the cooperation of Soviet Union broadcasters, Musikantenstadl was broadcast live from Moscow in Russia with Tatyana Wedenejewa, a well known Russian TV presenter acting as co-host.

== Stadlstern ==
Stadlstern or Barnstar for the English translation is awarded to a volksmusik singer or group live on Silvesterstadl following a public vote. The viewers choose who they want to be the stadlstern winner of that year from 3 contestants, each representing Austria, Switzerland and Germany. Stadlstern began in 2006 and for 5 consecutive years (2006-2010) was won by performers from Switzerland. On the 30th year celebration show of Musikantenstadl, the stadlstern winners of 2006 to 2010 performed in a medley format.

=== Stadlstern winners ===
- 2006 – Nicolas Senn
- 2007 – Oesch's die Dritten
- 2008 – Yasmine-Melanie
- 2009 – Lisa Stoll
- 2010 – Florian & Seppli
- 2011 – Marilena
- 2012 – Sandra Ledermann
- 2013 – Geschwister Weber
- 2014 – Johannes Weinberger

== TV Channels ==
It is broadcast on the 3 European TV Channels ORF 2 (ORF), Das Erste (ARD) and SRF 1 (SRF).

== History ==
=== Karl Moik Era (1981–2005) ===
Musikantenstadl's first episode was broadcast from Enns, Austria on 5 March 1981 hosted by Karl Moik along with Hias Mayer a comedian. Moik traveled the world with this show to places such as:

Special Show Locations

- Toronto, Canada at Coliseum Arena at Exhibition Place on 26 May 1994
- Melbourne, Australia at Flinders Park on 23 September 1995.
- Cape Town, South Africa at Good Hope Centre on 30 November 1996.
- Orlando, Florida, United States at Disney World on 14 March 1998.
- Beijing, China on 16 October 1999.
- Dubai, United Arab Emirates at Dubai Creek on 8 December 2001.

=== Andy Borg Era (2006–Present) ===
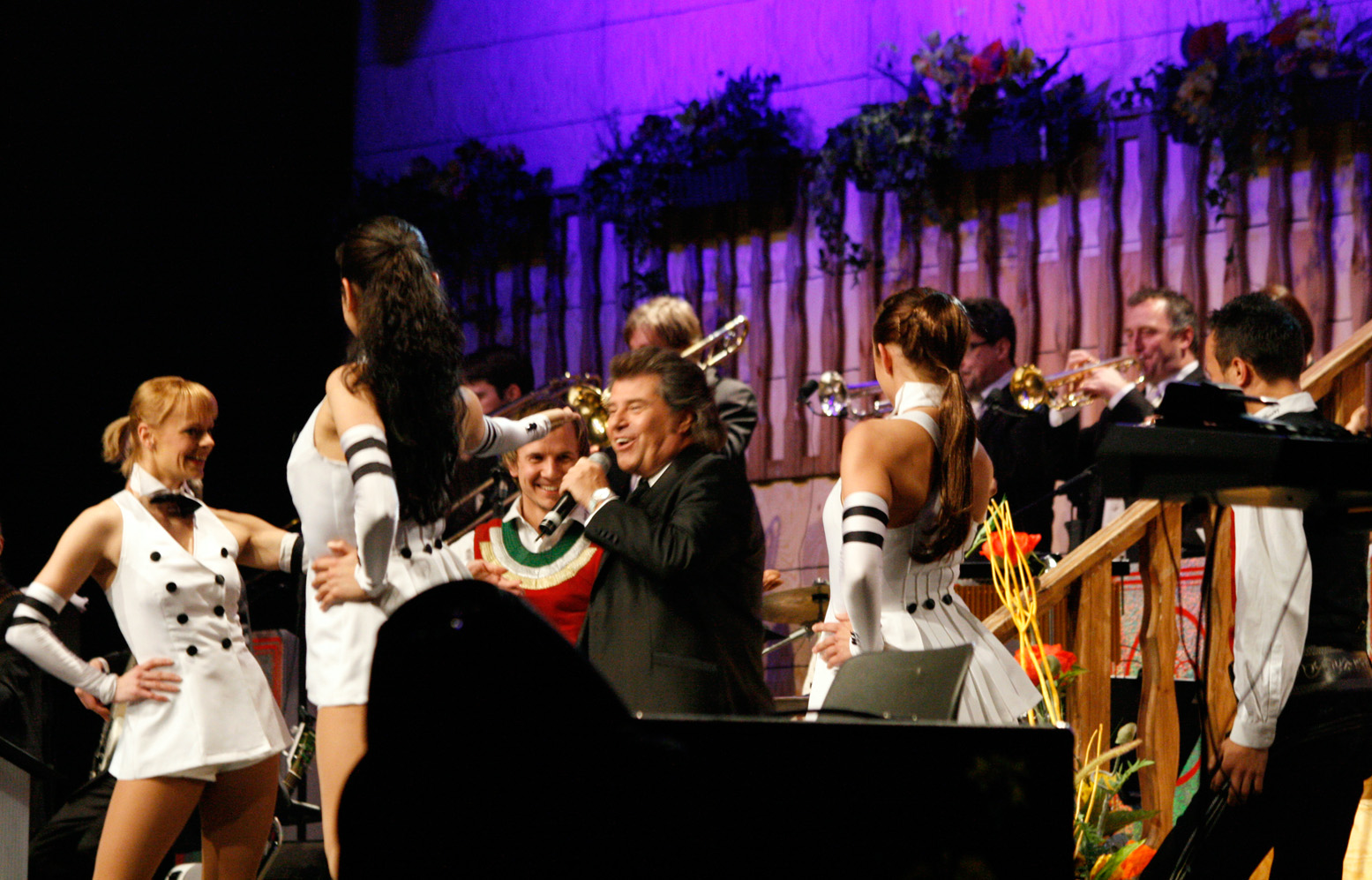
Andy Borg, Musikantenstadl Live Tour in 2010

In 2005, Andy Borg became host of the revamped program, with the German comedy duo "Waltraud & Mariechen" (Volker Heißmann & Martin Rassau) providing humor. His first show was aired on 23 September 2006 in Wiener Neustadt, Austria. Andy Borg is starting to take the show worldwide just like Karl Moik did. His first stop Poreč, Croatia on 7 May 2011. In April 2013 there is a Cruise planned to travel to Florida, Haiti, Mexico and Jamaica.

On Saturday 20 June 2015 Andy presented his last Musikantenstadl in an open-air show live from Pula, Croatia. As of September 2015, the new Stadlshow will be presented by Francine Jordi and Alexander Mazza.

== 30 Years on TV ==
On 12 March 2011 Musikantenstadl celebrated their 30-year anniversary of being on TV. The show was located in Freiburg, Germany was hosted by Andy Borg. Unfortunately this was the same day as the Japan tsunami, so Musikantenstadl was not broadcast live. The show was later aired on 26 March 2011. A few singers performing were: Hansi Hinterseer, Semino Rossi, Die Stoakogler, Peter Kraus, Stefan Mross, Francine Jordi, DJ Ötzi, Oesch's die Dritten and Ursprung Buam. The first host Karl Moik was not present at the celebration show.

== Reception ==
=== Overall response ===
Musikantenstadl is the most successful and long running show featuring volksmusik and schlager in the German-speaking world. As of November 2012 the program had recorded 174 shows including 7 overseas broadcasts.

=== United Kingdom ===
In the United Kingdom only some people know about the show, it being in the German language and not being broadcast in the country by United Kingdom broadcasters, however in the 1990s and into the early 21st century the widespread home reception of direct satellite broadcast analogue television from the Astra satellite system, usually bought for receiving English language broadcasts from the Sky television company, gave access to several German channels such as ARD, ZDF, SAT1, MDR, NDR, WDR which were carried on the Astra satellite and due to the large size of the broadcast footprint were available in the clear with an ordinary household satellite reception dish, where there were many music programmes, such as volksmusik and Andre Rieu concerts; indeed England got mentioned on SAT1 when in one programme the presenter, Ramona Leiss, listed from where postcards to the programme had been sent. However Musikantenstadl has attracted a number of artists from Britain including Tony Christie, Ross Antony and Roger Whitaker who have become successful schlager artists in the German-speaking world as a result of the show. The broadcast has had mixed views from British people who are aware of it with some positives to the point where some have questioned if a similar style of program to Musikantenstadl could work in Britain.
