= Ursprung Buam =

Ursprung Buam is an Austrian folk music trio from Zillertal, Tyrol. One of the most popular touring groups in Austria, Ursprung Buam often tours Germany, many places across the European Union, as well as the Tirolean festival scene. They have had over twenty releases since 1998. Most of these albums have held strong positions on the Austrian popular music charts. The group consists of brothers Martin Brugger (born 11 December 1976) and Andreas Brugger (born 29 December 1978) and their older cousin, Mannfred Höllwarth (born 5 April 1962). Founded in 1993, the trio is widely considered Austria's number-one folk music group; in 2001, the group won the Austria Music Award - Amadeus in recognition of its status. On 12 March 2011 they performed "Grande Canale" as Musikantenstadl celebrated their 30-year anniversary of being on TV.

Ursprung Buam means "Origin Boys" in Austro-Bavarian, in which their song lyrics are written as well.

Martin Brugger plays the fiddle, and Andreas Brugger the accordion; Höllwarth plays the bass and harp. The group cultivates the art of yodeling in its songs, which focus on the Zillertal region.

== Discography ==
=== Studio albums ===
- 2020 Weihnachten mit Den Ursprung Buam
- 2020 Walpurgisnacht
- 2019 Hund hemma scho
- 2018 25 Jahre - 25 Lieder
- 2017 C'est la Vie
- 2016 Trachtig übernachtig
- 2015 Große Erfolge
- 2015 Do ist der Wurm drin
- 2014 A Geig'n muass her
- 2013 Gamsjaga
- 2012 Das Beste - Live
- 2012 Adam und Eva
- 2011 Mück'n fliagn
- 2010 Amors Pfeil
- 2009 Hereinspaziert ins Zillertal
- 2008 Grande Canale
- 2008 Unsere schönsten volkstümlichen Schlager
- 2007 Ursprung Baum-Star Edition (compilation)
- 2007 Diamanten der Volksmusik
- 2007 A fesches boarisches Madl
- 2007 Sonderedition (3 disk compilation)
- 2006 Zwei rehbraune Augen
- 2005 Hit-Mix (compilation)
- 2005 Ein Casanova kann nicht aufgeig'n
- 2004 Das Beste der Ursprung Buam (compilation)
- 2004 Der Geigenspieler aus dem Zillertal
- 2004 Aufgeigt weacht im Zillertal
- 2004 S'Original vom Zillertal
- 2004 Gold (compilation)
- 2003 Die schönsten Jodler
- 2003 Romeo & Julia
- 2002 Don Camillo und Peppone
- 2001 Damenwahl hamma heit'
- 2000 A urige Weihnacht
- 2000 I bin der Teufelsgeigerbua
- 1999 Aufgeigt weacht
- 1998 A Riesenstimmung aus dem Zillertal

=== Live albums ===
- 2007 Live Im Zillertal

=== Other ===
- 2007 Ursprung Buam - Live im Zillertal DVD
- 2005 Ursprung Buam - Ein Casanova kann nicht aufgeig'n DVD
