= Switzerland in the Eurovision Song Contest 2002 =

- Eurovision Song Contest 2002
- Participating broadcaster: Swiss Broadcasting Corporation (SRG SSR)
- Country: Switzerland
- Selection process: Eurosong 2002
- Selection date: 2 February 2002

Competing entry
- Song: "Dans le jardin de mon âme"
- Artist: Francine Jordi
- Songwriter: Francine Lehmann

Placement
- Final result: 22nd, 15 points

Participation chronology

Switzerland was represented at the Eurovision Song Contest 2002 with the song "Dans le jardin de mon âme" written and performed by Francine Jordi. The Swiss participating broadcaster, the Swiss Broadcasting Corporation (SRG SSR), selected its entry through a national final. The broadcaster returned to the contest after a one-year absence following its relegation from 2001 as one of the bottom six entrants in 2000. Eight entries performed during the national final on 2 February 2002 where two rounds of public voting ultimately selected "Dans le jardin" performed by Francine Jordi as the winner. The song was later retitled as "Dans le jardin de mon âme".

Switzerland competed in the Eurovision Song Contest which took place on 25 May 2002. Performing during the show in position 11, Switzerland placed twenty-second out of the 24 participating countries, scoring 22 points.

== Background ==
Prior to the 2002 Contest, the Swiss Broadcasting Corporation (SRG SSR) had participated in the Eurovision Song Contest representing Switzerland forty-two times since its first entry in 1956. It won that first edition of the contest with the song "Refrain" performed by Lys Assia. Its second victory was achieved in 1988 with the song "Ne partez pas sans moi" performed by Canadian singer Céline Dion. In 2000 "La vita cos'è?" performed by Jane Bogaert placed 20th earning 14 points.

As part of its duties as participating broadcaster, SRG SSR organises the selection of its entry in the Eurovision Song Contest and broadcasts the event in the country. The broadcaster has selected its entry for the contest through both national finals and internal selections in the past. Since 1998, it has opted to organize a national final in order to select its entry, a selection procedure it continued for its 2002 entry.

== Before Eurovision ==
=== Eurosong 2002 ===
Eurosong 2002 was the national final organised by SRG SSR to select its entry for the Eurovision Song Contest 2002. The Swiss-Italian broadcaster Televisione Svizzera di lingua italiana (TSI) staged the national final on 2 February 2002 at the Garage Music nightclub in Arbedo-Castione (Bellinzona). The show was hosted by Milena Martelli and was televised on SF 2 with German commentary by Sandra Studer, TSI 1, and TSR 2 with French commentary by Jean-Marc Richard and Phil Mundwiller. The competition was also streamed online at the TSI's official website rtsi.ch.

==== Competing entries ====
A submission period was opened for interested artists and composers to submit their entries to the three divisions of SRG SSR — Swiss-German and Romansh broadcaster Schweizer Fernsehen der deutschen und rätoromanischen Schweiz (SF DRS), Swiss-French broadcaster Télévision suisse romande (TSR), and TSI — between 19 July 2001 and 19 October 2001. Eligible songs were required to have been composed by songwriters from Switzerland. A total of 154 entries were submitted following the submission deadline: 60 were submitted to TSR, 58 were submitted to SF DRS, and 36 were submitted to TSI. The nine artists and songs that qualified for the national final were announced on 13 November 2001. Prior to the competition, Camen withdrew his song "First Love", written by Pascal Camenzind and Martin Gisler, due to health issues.

==== Final ====
The final took place on 2 February 2002. The eight candidate songs in contention to represent Switzerland were performed and two rounds of televoting selected the winner. In the first round, the top three entries were selected to advance to the second round. In the second round, "Dans le jardin" performed by Francine Jordi was selected as the winner. In addition to the performances from the competing entries, the interval act featured a newly recorded performance of "O mein Papa" by Lys Assia.

First Round – 2 February 2002
R/O	Artist	Song	Songwriter(s)	Televote	Place
1	Matì	"Via dal buio"	Matteo Mazza	1.6%	8
2	Francine Jordi	"Dans le jardin"	Francine Lehmann	—	—
3	Marc Neff and Friends	"It's a Perfect Day"	Marc Neff	7.5%	5
4	Amanda	"Fuego latino"	Amanda Blatter, Urs Wiesendanger	3.7%	6
5	Luciano de Soria	"Mia vita"	Luciano de Soria, Bernardos Yorgos	1.9%	7
6	Tanisha	"My Little Freaky Boy"	Martin Kohler, Tanisha Ammann	10.7%	4
7	A-Live	"Cosa"	Peter Zehnder	—	—
8	Nina Dimitri	"Die Engel tanzen um Mitternacht per te"	Véronique Müller	—	—

Second Round – 2 February 2002
R/O	Artist	Song	Televote	Place
1	Francine Jordi	"Dans le jardin"	41.1%	1
2	A-Live	"Cosa"	35.6%	2
3	Nina Dimitri	"Die Engel tanzen um Mitternacht per te"	23.3%	3

== At Eurovision ==
According to Eurovision rules, all nations with the exceptions of the bottom six countries in the 2001 contest competed in the final. On 9 November 2001, a special allocation draw was held which determined the running order and Switzerland was set to perform in position 11, following the entry from Israel and before the entry from Sweden. Switzerland finished in twenty-second place with 15 points.

In Switzerland, three broadcasters that form SRG SSR aired both shows of the contest. Sandra Studer (who represented Switzerland in 1991) provided German commentary on SF DRS, Phil Mundwiller provided French commentary on TSR, while Jonathan Tedesco and Claudio Lazzarino provided Italian commentary on TSI.

=== Voting ===
Below is a breakdown of points awarded to Switzerland and awarded by Switzerland in the contest. The nation awarded its 12 points to Spain in the contest. SRG SSR appointed Diana Jörg as its spokesperson to announce the Swiss votes during the show.

Points awarded to Switzerland
Score	Country
12 points	
10 points	
8 points	
7 points	
6 points	
5 points	Austria
4 points	
3 points	France; Romania
2 points	Germany
1 point	Latvia; Slovenia

Points awarded by Switzerland
Score	Country
12 points	Spain
10 points	France
8 points	Latvia
7 points	Austria
6 points	United Kingdom
5 points	Croatia
4 points	Malta
3 points	Germany
2 points	Slovenia
1 point	Israel
