= Stefan Mross =

German trumpeter, singer and television presenter (born 1975)

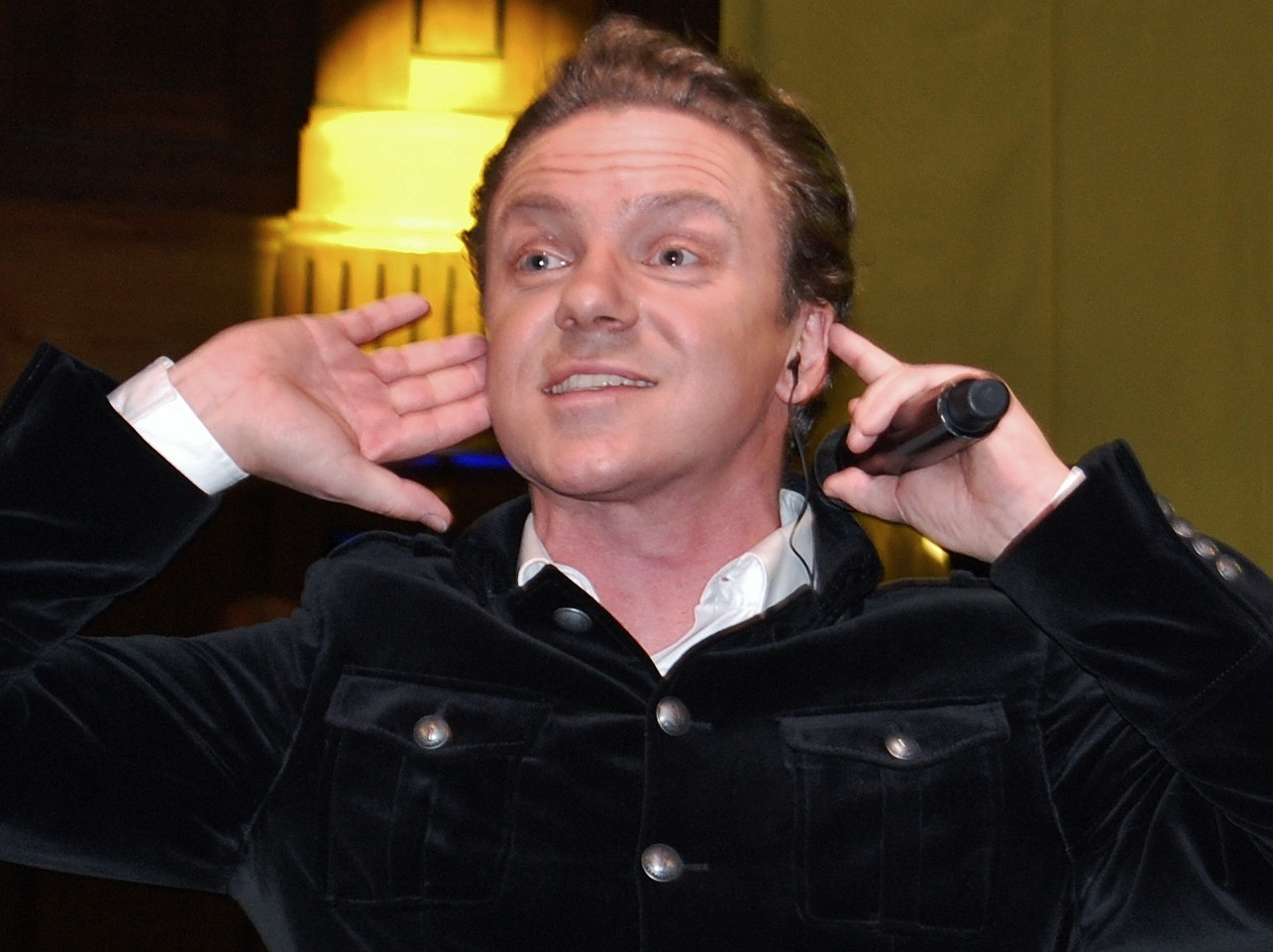
- Mross in 2013
- Born: November 26, 1975 (age 49); Traunstein, Upper Bavaria, Germany
- Education: Mozarteum University Salzburg
- Occupations: Trumpeter; singer; television presenter
- Spouse(s): Stefanie Hertel (married 2006–2012); Susanne Schmidt (married 2013–2016); Anna-Carina Woitschack (married 2020–2022)
- Partner: Eva Luginger (2023–present)
- Children: 3
- Musical career
- Instruments: Vocals; trompet
- Website: stefan-mross.de

Stefan Mross (born November 26, 1975) is a German trumpeter, singer, and television presenter. He is one of the most famous German folk musicians.

== Early life and education ==
Stefan Mross was born on November 26, 1975, in Traunstein, Upper Bavaria.

Mross completed his secondary education in his hometown. He took the entrance exam to the Mozarteum in Salzburg, but then concentrated on his musical career.

== Career ==
Since 2005, Mross has hosted the ARD (SWR) show Immer wieder sonntags live from Europa-Park in Rust. On August 10, 2014, Mross collapsed during a live broadcast of the show after eating a very hot currywurst and had to stop presenting. He was represented by Guido Cantz for the rest of the broadcast.

== Personal life ==
Mross was married to Stefanie Hertel from 2006 to 2012 and has a daughter with her in 2001. Three months after the couple announced their separation, Karl Moik claimed on December 6, 2011, on the ZDF show Markus Lanz that the partnership between his former Mross and Hertel had been arranged for the media.

Mross was married to production assistant Susanne Schmidt from 2013 to 2016. The marriage produced a daughter in 2013 and a son in 2015. The couple lived in Unterwössen, a municipality in the Traunstein district of Upper Bavaria, until their separation in autumn 2016.

Since December 2016, he has been in a relationship with singer Anna-Carina Woitschack, whom he met on his show Immer wieder sonntags in the summer of 2016. In the show Das Adventsfest der 100.000 Lichter he proposed to her on November 30, 2019. On June 6, 2020, the two got married live on television in the music show Schlagerlovestory.2020 with presenter Florian Silbereisen as witnesses. The couple lived in Windorf near Passau. In November 2022, they announced their separation. Mross has been in a relationship with Eva Luginger since March 2023.

== Discography ==
=== Albums ===
- Heimwehmelodie (1989)
- In unserer Hand liegt unsere Erde (1993)
- Sehnsuchtsmelodie (1994)
- Das große Wunschkonzert (1994)
- Weihnachten mit dir (1994)
- Ein Lied für jeden Sonnenstrahl (1995)
- Zauber der Trompete (1996)
- Musik ist Trumpf (1996)
- So schön ist Volksmusik (1997)
- Weihnachten: Unser Fest der Liebe (1997)
- Gold (1998)
- Herz an Herz (1999)
- Mein Wunschkonzert (2000)
- Trompetenzauber (2002)
- Stille Nacht, heilige Nacht (2003)
- Musik fürs Herz (2003)
- Von Herzen alles Gute (2004)
- Immer wieder Stefan (2006)
- Echte Freunde (2008)
- Greif zu (2011)
- Meine beste Zeit (2013)
- 25 Jahre – Das große Jubiläumsalbum (2014)
- Stark wie zwei (2020)
