= Adiós Amor (Andy Borg song) =

German-language song by Andy Borg

Single by Andy Borg
- Released: 1982
- Label: Papagayo
- Composer(s): Tex Shultzieg
- Lyricist(s): Kurt Feltz

"Adios Amor" is a 1982 hit German-language song by Andy Borg on Papagayo/EMI Electrola. It was Borg's debut single, and was No. 1 in Germany for five weeks 27 August–24 September, remaining in the charts for a total 39 weeks. The single was also No. 1 in Austria, where it spent 30 weeks in the charts, and No. 2 in Switzerland. The album Adiós Amor in the same year also went to the top of the album charts in both Germany and Austria. It remains Borg's signature song. The lyrics by Kurt Feltz to music by Tex Shultzieg (b.1948) arranged by Alexander Gietz. The song begins "Ich sah dir in's Gesicht, du sagtest: Frag mich nicht".

== Trivia ==
Kurt Feltz died hours before the song has been aired first time in the German Hitparade on a heart attack while he was swimming in the sea.
