= Francine Jordi =

Swiss pop singer (born 1977)

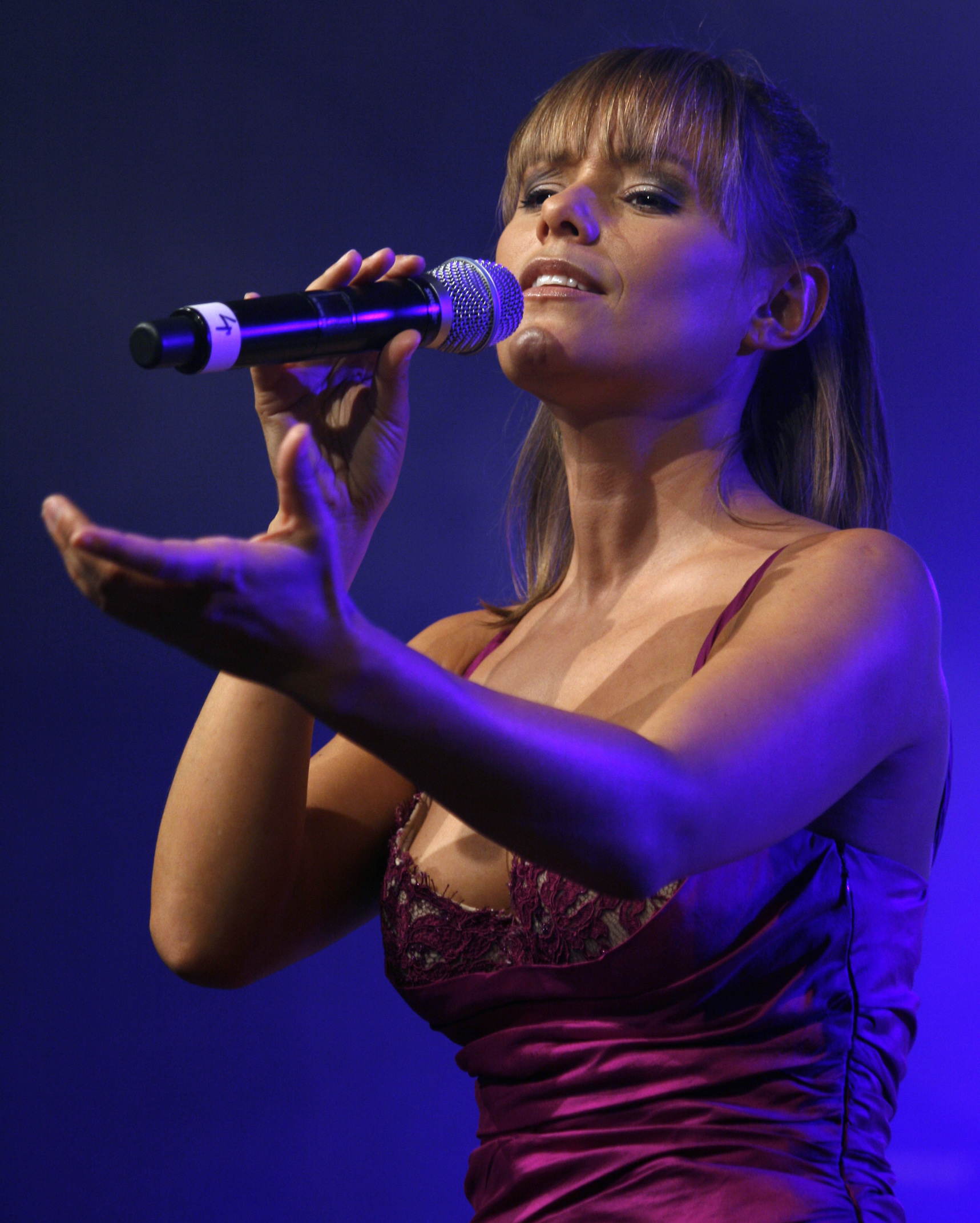
- Francine Jordi (Vienna 2008)

Background information
- Born: Francine Lehmann; 24 June 1977 (age 49)
- Origin: Worb, Canton of Bern, Switzerland
- Genres: Schlager, Volksmusik
- Occupation: Singer
- Years active: 1998–present
- Website: www.francinejordi.ch

Francine Jordi (born Francine Lehmann, 24 June 1977) is a Swiss pop singer.

As a young child, she sang songs for Japanese tourists in Interlaken. With this musical background she won the German Grand Prix der Volksmusik in 1998 with the song "Das Feuer der Sehnsucht". Jordi subsequently became a star in Switzerland with chart success singing mostly in German and leading to golden records and tours throughout not only Switzerland, but also Germany and Austria. She hosted two TV shows at the ARD. In 2002, she represented Switzerland at the Eurovision Song Contest in Tallinn with a French language song "Dans le jardin de mon âme". In autumn that year, she made a solo tour with her band in Switzerland.

As of September 2015, Jordi has been presenter of the long-running TV show, Musikantenstadl.

== Albums discography ==
- 1998: Das Feuer der Sehnsucht
- 1999: Ein Märchen aus Eis
- 2000: Wunschlos glücklich
- 2001: Verliebt in das Leben
- 2002: Im Garten meiner Seele
- 2003: Alles steht und fällt mit Dir
- 2004: Einfach Francine Jordi (compilation)
- 2005: Halt mich
- 2007: Dann kamst du
- 2009: Meine kleine grosse Welt
- 2011: Lago Maggiore (with Florian Ast)
- 2013: Verliebt geliebt
- 2015: Wir
- 2016: Nur für dich
- 2018: Noch lange nicht genug
- 2021: Herzfarben
- 2024: Ein Stückchen Weihnacht - Mein Geschenk für Dich

Preceded by Jane Bogaert with "La vita cos'è?"	Switzerland in the Eurovision Song Contest; 2002	Succeeded by Piero and the MusicStars with "Celebrate"
