= Adiós, amor mío =

Mexican telenovela

- Genre: Telenovela
- Starring: Amparo Rivelles
- Country of origin: Mexico
- Original language: Spanish

Original release
- Network: Telesistema Mexicano
- Release: 1962 – 1962

Adiós, amor mío (English: Goodbye, my love) is a Mexican telenovela produced by Televisa and broadcast by Telesistema Mexicano in 1962.

== Cast ==
- Amparo Rivelles - Juana
- José Gálvez - Gabriel
- Rosa Elena Durgel - Paulina
- Ramón Bugarini - Rolando
- Rosa Cué - María
- Rosa Elena Durgel - Paulina
