= Karl Moik =

Austrian television presenter (1938–2015)

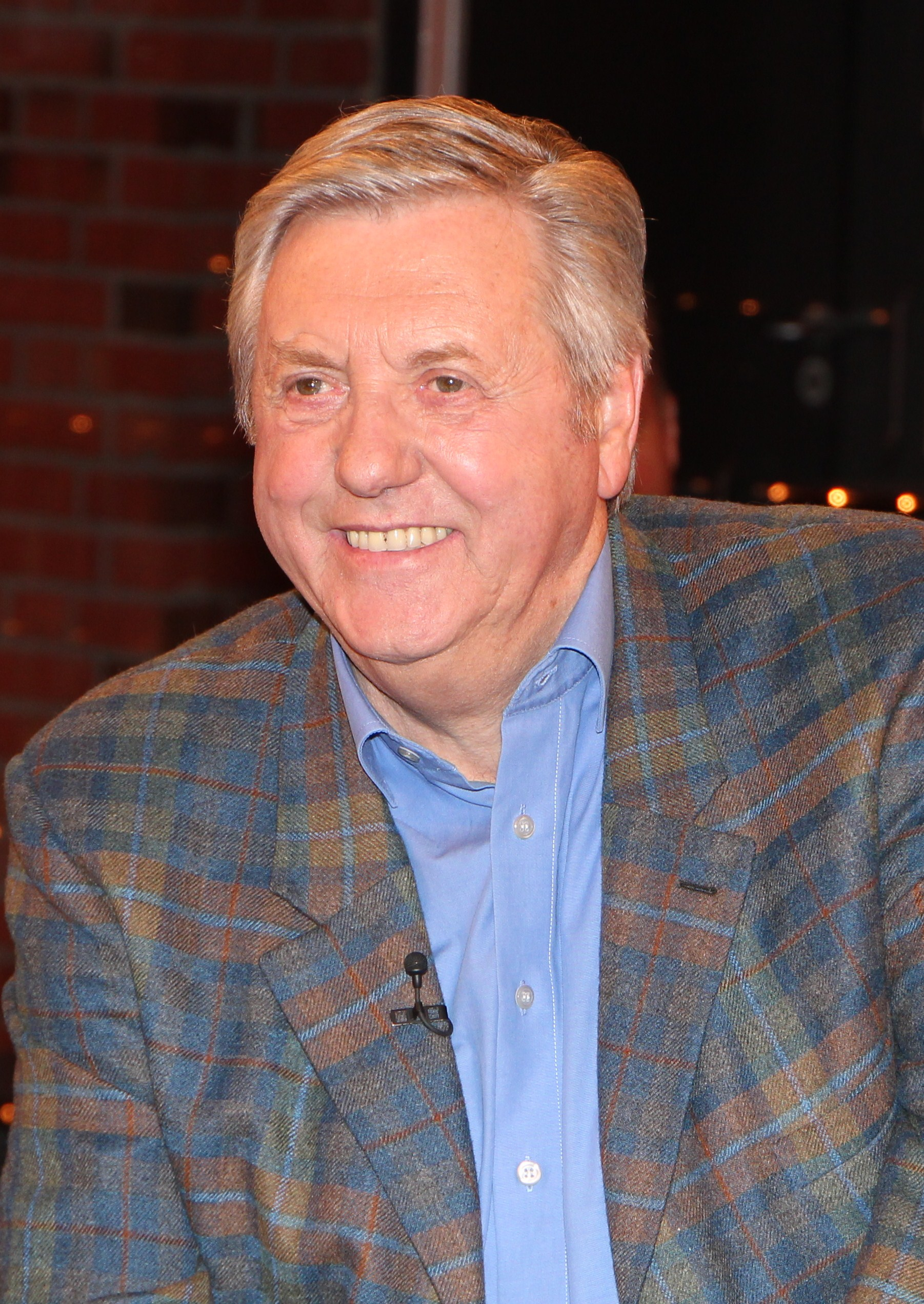
- Moik in 2011
- Born: 19 June 1938; Linz, Upper Austria, Nazi Germany
- Died: 26 March 2015 (aged 76); Salzburg, Salzburg, Austria
- Occupations: Television presenter, singer
- Years active: 1973–2014
- Known for: Presenting the Musikantenstadl from 1981 till 2005

Karl Moik (19 June 1938 – 26 March 2015) was an Austrian television presenter and singer.

== Life ==
Moik was born in Linz. He became famous in Austria, Germany, German-speaking Switzerland and South Tyrol as the television presenter of the music show Musikantenstadl, an Austrian-German-Swiss co-production (Eurovision). He presented the Musikantenstadl from 1981 to 2005, earning him the honorary title by fans as Mr. Musikantenstadl. He died in Salzburg, aged 76, and was buried in Oberalm.

== Songs ==
- Das Zipferl vom Glück
- Servus, pfüat Gott und Auf Wiedersehn
- Ja, heute woll'n wir feiern
- Einer hat immer das Bummerl
- Es dreht sich alles nur um's Geld

== Awards ==
- 2004: Krone der Volksmusik
- 2007: Krone der Volksmusik
