= Andy Borg =

Austrian Schlager singer (born 1960)

Adolf Andreas Meyer
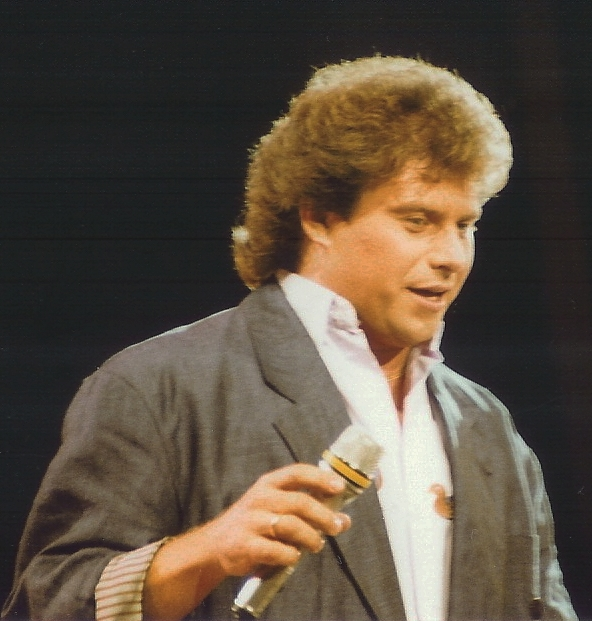
- Borg in 1989
- Born: 2 November 1960 (age 65); Vienna, Austria
- Other name: Andy Borg
- Occupations: Singer, television presenter
- Known for: Hosting the Musikantenstadl (since September 2006)

Adolf Andreas Meyer (born 2 November 1960 in Floridsdorf, Vienna), best known by his stage name Andy Borg, is an Austrian Schlager singer and TV presenter. He lives in the Passau area and has been recording music since his debut album Adios Amor which was released as an English version in 1982. In 2006 he replaced Karl Moik as host of the popular ORF show Musikantenstadl. His most successful song was his debut "Adiós Amor" in 1982 which spent 39 weeks in the German charts.

== Discography ==
=== Albums ===
Year	Name	Chart position		
Year	Name	Germany	Switzerland	Austria
1982	Adios Amor	1	2	1
1984	Zärtliche Lieder	12	5	1
1984	Gabentisch der Lieder	–	–	2
1985	Komm ganz nah' zu mir	39	–	7
1986	Am Anfang war die Liebe	37	–	18
1987	Ich brauch' Dich jeden Tag	–	–	13
1988	Endstation Sehnsucht	–	–	15
1989	Bis wir uns wiederseh'n	–	–	–
1990	Komm setz di auf an Sonnenstrahl (mit Alexandra)	–	–	–
1991	Ich sag' es mit Musik	–	–	–
1992	Bleib bei mir heut' Nacht	–	–	38
1993	Einmal und immer wieder	–	–	–
1993	Single Hit Collection 1982 – 1992	–	–	–
1994	Ich brauch' ein bisschen Glück	–	–	29
1995	Ich freu' mich auf Dich	45	–	24
1996	Was wäre wenn ...	–	–	44
1997	Gold	–	–	31
1998	Ich sag' ja zu Dir	–	–	41
2000	Andy Borg 2000	–	–	–
2001	Super Glücklich	–	–	–
2002	Herzklopfzeichen	–	–	63
2004	Träumen erlaubt	–	–	66
2005	Wenn erst der Abend kommt (Andy Borg singt seine Lieblingshits von Peter Alexander)	100	–	–
2005	Für dich allein – Die schönsten Liebeslieder	–	–	–
2006	Das ist mir zu gefährlich	–	–	37
2008	Weinachten	–	–	71
2009	Santa Maria	58	48	4
2011	Komm ein bisschen mit	–	95	26
2012	Blauer Horizont	51	42	6
2014	San Amore	40	28	4
2015	33 Jahre Adios Amor – 33 große Erfolge	90	37	4
2017	Cara Mia	67	28	1
2018	Meine ersten großen Hits	–	–	62
2018	Jugendliebe – Unvergessene Schlager	68	39	1
