= Michael Johnson =

Michael, Mike, Mick or Mickey Johnson may refer to:

== Arts ==
=== Music ===
- Mike Johnson (bassist) (born 1965), American songwriter and bass guitarist
- Michael Johnson (drummer) (born 1982), American pop singer and drummer
- Mike Johnson (guitarist) (born 1952), American experimental rock guitarist and composer
- Michael Johnson (singer) (1944–2017), American pop, country and folk singer-songwriter and guitarist
- Mike Johnson (yodeler) (born 1946), American country music yodeler
- Michael Johnson, known by his stage name Twisted Insane (born 1982), American rapper and songwriter

=== Other arts ===
- Michael Johnson (graphic designer) (born 1964), British graphic designer
- Mick Johnson, fictional character in the soap opera Brookside
- Mike Johnson (animator), stop motion animator and co-director of Corpse Bride
- Mike Johnson (author) (born 1947), New Zealand writer
- Mike Johnson (The Real World), cast member of MTV reality series The Real World: London
- Mike Johnson (The Bachelorette contestant) (born 1987), contestant of The Bachelorette US
- Mika Johnson, American-Finnish multimedia artist

== Politicians ==
- Mike Johnson (born 1972), 56th Speaker of the United States House of Representatives
- Michael Johnson (Australian politician) (born 1970), member of the Australian House of Representatives
- Michael Johnson (Alaska politician)
- Michael Johnson (Wisconsin politician) (1832–1908), member of the Wisconsin State Assembly
- Michael Johnson (Missouri politician), member of the Missouri House of Representatives
- Mike Johnson (Oklahoma politician) (1944–2022), member of the Oklahoma Senate
- Michael Johnson (South Carolina politician), member of the South Carolina Senate
- Michael T. Johnson, member of the Louisiana House of Representatives

== Sports ==
=== American football ===
- Mike Johnson (cornerback) (1943–2003), American football player for the Dallas Cowboys, 1966–1969
- Mike Johnson (linebacker) (born 1962), American football player, 1984–1995, mostly for the Cleveland Browns
- Mike Johnson (defensive end) (born 1962), American football player, 1984, Houston Oilers
- Mike Johnson (American football coach) (born 1967), former offensive coordinator for the San Francisco 49ers
- Michael Johnson (safety) (born 1984), American football player for the Detroit Lions. 2011, New York Giants, 2007–2010
- Michael Johnson (defensive end) (born 1987), American football player for the Tampa Bay Buccaneers 2014, Cincinnati Bengals, 2009–2013
- Mike Johnson (offensive lineman) (born 1987), American football player for the Atlanta Falcons, 2010–2014

=== Association football ===
- Mike Johnson (footballer, born 1933) (1933–2004), English footballer and manager
- Michael Johnson (footballer, born 1941) (1941–1991), Welsh international footballer (Swansea City)
- Michael Johnson (footballer, born 1973), English-born Jamaican international footballer and manager
- Michael Johnson (footballer, born 1988), English footballer (Manchester City)
- Michael Johnson (footballer, born 1994), Maltese footballer

=== Other sports ===
- Michael Johnson (Australian rules footballer) (born 1984), Australian rules player for the Fremantle Dockers, 2005–2018
- Michael Johnson (bodybuilder), Canadian bodybuilder
- Michael Johnson (canoeist) (born 1941), American Olympic canoeist
- Michael Johnson (cricketer) (born 1988), Australian cricketer
- Michael Johnson (field hockey) (born 1979), British former field hockey player
- Michael Johnson (fighter) (born 1986), American mixed martial arts fighter
- Michael Johnson (Gaelic footballer), former Antrim Gaelic footballer
- Michael Johnson (sprinter) (born 1967), American World and Olympic Champion sprinter
- Michael Johnson (sprinter, born 1978), American sprinter, winner of the 1998 NCAA Division I outdoor 4 × 400 m relay championship
- Michael Johnson (sport shooter) (born 1973), New Zealand World and Paralympic Champion shooter
- Mickey Johnson (born 1952), American basketball player
- Mike Johnson (ice hockey) (born 1974), Canadian ice hockey player, 1997–2008
- Mike Johnson (1990s pitcher) (born 1975), Canadian Olympic and Major League Baseball pitcher
- Mike Johnson (1970s pitcher) (1951–2026), American Major League Baseball player
- Mike Johnson (hurdler) (born 1955), American hurdler, 1975 and 1977 All-American for the USC Trojans track and field team

== Others ==
- Crispus Attucks (1723–1770), sailor who may have used the alias "Michael Johnson"
- Michael Johnson (murderer, born 1977) (1977–2006), American criminal sentenced to death for one murder
- Michael Johnson (serial killer) (born 1986), American serial killer
- Mike Johnson (technologist), technologist and pioneer in superscalar microprocessor design
- Michael D. Johnson, dean of Cornell University School of Hotel Administration
- Michael P. Johnson (born 1942), American sociologist
- Michael O. Johnson, American entrepreneur; CEO of Herbalife

== See also ==
- Michael Johnston (disambiguation)
- Michael Johnsen, Australian politician
- Michael Jonzun, musician and producer in the band Jonzun crew
- Mikael Jonsson (born 1966), Swedish chef
