= Beatin Hearts =

Studio album by Builders
- Released: July 1983 (NZ)
- Recorded: July–September, 1982
- Studio: Progressive Studio, Auckland New Zealand
- Genre: Rock; pop; psychedelic rock
- Length: 57:00
- Label: Flying Nun, South Indies, Grapefruit
- Producer: Flying Nun

Beatin Hearts is the debut studio album by New Zealand band Builders. It was recorded in August 1982 and released in 1983. Characteristically for the band, the album caused typographical difficulties for critics writing about the album, as its title contains an ambiguous character. The capital "I" of the word "Beatin" contains a cross bar in the centre, so that it doubles as an "E". The title may therefore be read (but not spoken) as both "Beatin' Hearts" and "Beaten Hearts".

Sessions for the album were held in three days at Progressive Studios in Anzac Ave, Auckland, with Terry King engineering. The album was mixed at Progressive. The entire project was financed by Flying Nun and steered by Chris Knox and promoter Doug Hood. Two years after its initial release the album was purchased by South Indies, who licensed the album to Grapefruit in the US for 2016 vinyl re-release. Flying Nun re-released the album as a CD, in 1994.

== Critical reception ==
"Direen's masterpiece, Beatin Hearts (1983), was recorded in Auckland's Progressive studios with prize money from the 1982 Battle of the Bands in Christchurch. The album is chock-full of smoky beat musings."

"The early Builders ... played gritty garage punk that owed a heavy musical debt to the Velvet Underground while addressing more indigenous lyrical concerns." Bill Meyer.

"He [Direen] plays fucking brilliantly, throws all his gut feelings, hard-won insights and barbed intellect into these unique songs while the pinball machines and drunken flirtations drown him out" Chris Knox, quoted in 1994.

== Personnel ==
Builders (1982)

- Bill Direen – lead, harmony and backing vocals; rhythm and lead guitars; Jansen organ; violin, bass, maracas.
- Campbell McLay – bass, lead and rhythm guitars.
- Malcolm Grant – drums.
- Chris Knox – Organ, harmonising vocals
- Mike Dooley – Drums.
