= Bill Direen, A Memory of Others =

2017 film by Simon Ogston

- Directed by: Simon Ogston
- Produced by: Simon Ogston
- Cinematography: Simon Ogston and Jeff Smith
- Release date: 14 July 2017 (Auckland)
- Running time: 87 minutes
- Country: New Zealand
- Language: English

Bill Direen, A Memory of Others is a 2017 documentary film produced and directed by Simon Ogston that follows Dunedin-Christchurch poet Bill Direen from Dunedin to Auckland on a tour of music and phono-aesthetic poetry. The full 87-minute documentary begins in a small Otago town where Direen is preparing for the tour, leading to interviews at radio stations and live performances in cafés, music foundations, libraries and a children's school. Ogston invited Direen to write poems along the way, which he performed on subjects such as (and in locations related to) writer Janet Frame, composer Douglas Lilburn and poet James K. Baxter. The film shows him rehearsing with the current lineup of his band The Bilders, while playing footage of earlier groups, and showing the process whereby a 16mm film of song The Cup was restored and remastered by the New Zealand Film Archive. Final interviews with Kiran Dass and with Ogston himself reveal something of Direen's approach to poetry and music. The film ends with an extract from his novel Song of the Brakeman and a tune from a rare vinyl LP of 1987.

A double vinyl LP of all tracks that feature in the film was released in 2019 by USA label Sophomore Lounge.

== See also ==
- List of New Zealand films
