= Michael Morrissey (writer) =

New Zealand writer

Michael Morrissey

Michael James Terence Morrissey (born 1942) is a New Zealand poet, short story writer, novelist, essayist, editor, feature article writer, book reviewer and columnist. He is the author of 14 volumes of poetry, two collections of short stories, a memoir, two stage plays and four novels and he has edited five other books.

Michael Morrissey was educated at St Peter's College, Auckland and studied law and English literature at the University of Auckland.

== Author ==
=== Literary career ===
Michael Morrissey has published five books of fiction and 14 books of poetry.

Morrissey's fiction and poetry have been published in literary journals in New Zealand and other countries. His work has appeared in Islands, Mate Landfall, Morepork, Climate, Poetry New Zealand, Listener, Pilgrims, Rambling Jack, Printout, brief, Bravado, Comment, Echoes, Tango, Cornucopia, IKA, Takahe, Titirangi Poets, Phantom Billstickers, Blackmail, Trout (New Zealand); Ocarina, Literary Half Yearly (India); New Poetry, Poetry Australia, Mattoid, Inprint (Australia); Gargoyle, Fiction International, Chelsea (United States); Percutio (France); Kunapipi (Denmark). His stories have also appeared in Metro and on newsroom.co.nz.

Morrissey's novel, Tropic of Skorpeo, published in 2012, is a satiric sci-fi fantasy in thriller mode.

His 80 plus published short stories range in genre from neo-social realism to surreal and postmodern styles.

His anthology The New Fiction (1985) was the first anthology of New Zealand postmodern fiction.

In 1979, he was the first Writer-in-Residence at the University of Canterbury. A Fulbright Cultural Travel Award in 1981 enabled him to visit several leading American universities where he studied the teaching of creative writing. On his return to New Zealand, he founded the Waiheke Summer Writing School which ran from 1983 to 1991.

In 1985, Morrissey was the first New Zealand participant in the International Writing Program at the University of Iowa from which he earned an Honorary Fellowship in Writing. In 1986, he was the New Zealand delegate at the 48th World Congress of International PEN in New York.

In 2012, he was appointed Writer-in-Residence at the University of Waikato.

Morrissey's essays have appeared in Landfall); in NZ Review of Books); in Islands); in Brief). In 1996, the Journal of New Zealand Literature included (in Volume 14) Morrissey's essay Lyricism, language and history: New Zealand poetry in 1992 a critical examination of 14 books of poetry - including works by Alistair Te Ariki Campbell, Hone Tuwhare, Keri Hulme and others. That essay was prefaced by a found poem comprising a line from each of the 14 books under review.

Morrissey's art criticism includes A bright apple beckons (a study of Wystan Curnow's art writings) and an analysis of the work of artist Jacqueline Fahey,

While in New York, Morrissey met and had dialogue with many famous writers. Subsequently, he wrote obituaries based on his personal encounters with Saul Bellow (7 May 2005), Kurt Vonnegut (28 April 2007) and Norman Mailer (1 December 2007) – all published in the New Zealand Listener. He has also written accounts of encounters with Samuel Beckett and Susan Sontag, published in Brief magazine.

Michael Morrissey's blog also includes a number of essays.

A short film by Costa Botes of one of Morrissey's stories, Stalin's Sickle, won the Grand Jury Prize at the Clermont-Ferrand Short Film Festival, in France, in 1988. Morrissey also created the original screenplay for The Last Surrealist, a film directed by Paul Judge and nominated for Best Short Film at the 1993 New Zealand Film and TV Awards.

In 2019, he was honoured by the NZ Society of Authors by being included in the NZSA honours list, recognising his years of service to writing in New Zealand and to the NZSA.

=== Influences ===
An autobiographical essay, Self portrait: Michael Morrissey, published on newsroom.co.nz in 2021, traces Morrissey's writing career and identifies important early influences on the development of his writing. He states that his interest in story-telling dates from his childhood when his Irish father would regale him with retellings of Gaelic myths.

A 1983 interview by Massey University academic Suzann Olsson with Michael Morrissey, published in Landfall 146, contains information on his evolution as a writer, noting how his poetry reflects his reading of poets such as William Carlos Williams and Wallace Stevens. The interview also traces the many strands that have influenced the evolution of his fiction. Morrissey also discusses the importance in his development as a writer of his Catholic upbringing.

Morrissey's memoir, Taming the Tiger (2011) documents his experiences with bipolar disorder, graphically describing two serious bipolar episodes and his forced hospitalisation. These episodes and Morrissey's mania were the subject of a feature-length documentary, Daytime Tiger, directed by Costa Botes, which premiered at the [New Zealand international film festival in 2011. An abridgement of Taming the Tiger in five episodes was read on RNZ National Radio on 23–27 July 2012.

Morrissey's bipolar disorder is also an important source of inspiration in his later poetry - for instance, his 2018 collection Poems from Hotel Middlemore.

=== Critics' views ===
In his extended essay on Morrissey's poetry in Poetry New Zealand in 2008, poet and critic John Horrocks described the range of Morrissey's verse, noting also that "one of the pleasures of reading these poems is the variety of personae assumed by the poet. This reflects an underlying energy that emerges in startling ways". Horrocks writes "The venturings in these poems are like those ... of the nameless principal of Henry Miller's novel Sexus. There is the same intentness and curiosity about ideas, the writer's licence to draw anything into consideration ... These are some of the reasons why Michael Morrissey's poetry stands apart". Horrocks says that Morrissey's collection Dreams "disturbs as it taps into the familiar territory of dreams: journeys, being trapped, superheroes, erotic encounters, sudden transformations, capricious authority figures and various kinds of death. These are extraordinary poems". Horrocks notes that Morrissey's development as a poet was influenced by Wallace Stevens and Sylvia Plath, and later by Curnow, Tony Beyer and Ian Wedde. Horrocks likens Morrissey's poetry variously to Kafka, Ginsberg, Miller and, especially Walt Whitman.

Critic Jack Ross notes that Morrissey's "fictions ranged from the Barthelme-like fables of The Fat Lady & The Astronomer (1981) to the gentle postmodernism of Doctorow's Ragtime in his classic story Jack Kerouac Sat Down beside the Wanganui River & Wept ... Paradise to Come (1997), his book of two novellas describing New Zealand's most distant and most recent waves of immigration, remains Morrissey's most accomplished and moving fiction to date". Ross also expresses his admiration for Morrissey's "... earlier works ... where a basic sense of Sargesonian realism underlies his taste for the extravagant and postmodern".

Discussing Morrissey's poetry in The Press in 1981, critic Peter Simpson wrote: "... women and warfare are ... inextricably tangled in Morrissey's mind; most of the poems read like dispatches from the front lines of a succession of sexual battlefields .... The few poems on topics other than the power politics of the bedroom tend to read like what the Americans call R-and-R between engagements ... there is ... a range of tone and mood, ranging through the spectrum of emotional postures from infatuation to bitter disenchantment ..."

Critic David Hill, reviewing Morrissey's The Fat Lady and the Astronomer in The New Zealand Listener noted that "... the whirligigs of style are always clever and often impressive, and the steady surrealism is a change from the muscular orthodoxy of much New Zealand fiction ..."

An extended interview with Michael Morrissey (by Suzann Olsson), appeared in Landfall 146. University of Otago literary historian, Lawrence Jones, included an essay on Morrissey's contribution to post-modern fiction in his 1987 collection of essays Barbed Wire and Mirrors: Essays on New Zealand Prose.

Australian critic Peter Goldsworthy wrote: "Morrissey is an extremely funny, extremely inventive writer … brims with a talent that is ironic, intelligent, fascinated by cliché and illuminated by an understanding of all the resources of language ..."

Reviewing Taming the Tiger in North & South magazine in November 2011, Paul Little wrote:

   "Michael Morrissey has written a brave, funny account of his mental illness. It begins when he has a breakdown while teaching a writing class – the sort of outburst that could easily be passed off as someone having a bad day. In his case, however, it seems no time at all before he is convinced he has AIDS, develops a way to end crime by holding neighbourhood parties, and comes up with a scheme to make millions by encouraging people to get naked on Waiheke – like that's hard. Finally, he is convinced he is the messiah and wrestles with the tricky question of whether or not to tell people.  Lithium comes into play and he slowly returns to normal. Then follows a cycle of feeling well, going off medication and becoming ill again.  He learns in the course of dealing with his own illness that his mother suffered from the same complaint and that her mother had died in an asylum.  It's a heart-rending and harrowing account, made compellingly readable by Morrissey's formidable literary skills, which have seldom been put to such good use. The objectivity of his self-portrait is remarkable but the real hero is his wife, Anne. He didn't have any choice about living with his condition. She did, and chose to stay, which can't have been easy when he decided she was a demon he had to destroy. ..... [This] is such a raw and thorough examination of a not uncommon condition. The author's stoicism brings to mind the last words of Samuel Beckett's The Unnameable: 'I can't go on. I'll go on.' It deserves a prominent place in the annals not just of literature about mental health but of New Zealand autobiography".

=== Awards ===
In 1989, Michael Morrissey was the inaugural winner of the Sunday-Star Times short story prize. He won the Auckland Star/Air New Zealand short story prize as well as the Auckland Teachers Short Story award. He won the poetry prize at Te Awamutu Rose Festival of the Arts 1981. In 1982, The Fat Lady and the Astronomer won the PEN Best First Book of Fiction award .

In 2019, he was honoured by the Society of Authors for his contribution to New Zealand writing. He has been appointed writer in residence by two New Zealand universities. He is an honorary fellow in writing at the University of Iowa.

=== Representation in anthologies ===
Morrissey's short stories have been widely anthologised, including in All the Dangerous Animals Are in Zoos (1981), New Zealand Writing Since 1945 (1983), I Have Seen the Future (1986), Metro Fiction (1987), Antipodes New Writing (1987), Short Story International (1987), Penguin Book of Contemporary New Zealand Short Stories (1989), The Oxford Book of New Zealand Short Stories (1992), The Faber Book of Contemporary South Pacific Stories (1994), Rutherford's Dreams (1995), Essential New Zealand Short Stories (2002 and 2009).

His poems have also been widely anthologised. Poems by Morrissey appear in The Penguin Book of Contemporary New Zealand Poetry (edited by Miriama Evans, Harvey McQueen and Ian Wedde (1989)), 100 New Zealand Poems (edited by Bill Manhire (1993)), Big Weather: Poems of Wellington. (selected by Gregory O’Brien and Louise White (2000)), 121 New Zealand Poems (chosen by Bill Manhire (2005)), the New Zealand Poetry Society's anthology Ice Diver (2011), Poetry New Zealand (2008), the New Zealand Poetry Yearbook (2020) and Live Lines. the series of anthologies of Poetry Live Auckland.

=== Readings and performances ===
In 1980, Morrissey organised and participated in a reading of new books of poetry at the Christchurch Town Hall. While in the US in 1895, he read his poetry at events hosted by the University of Iowa and was a panelist in seminars on cultural matters. Since 1992, Morrissey has been a regular reader at Poetry Live Auckland (a weekly poetry reading set up by poet David Mitchell in 1980 and held at Auckland's Thirsty Dog). The poems he read at those events have been published in the Poetry Live Auckland anthologies. He has also read at Lopdell House Gallery's Rhythm and Verse events. He also took part in the Writers Lounge series. He was one of 22 writers invited to take part in the 22 Fictioneers series of readings at the Auckland Art Gallery in 1992, sponsored by the Northern Regional Arts Council.

=== Creative writing classes ===
Morrissey taught creative writing over many years. In 1983, he set up the annual Waiheke Writing School on Waiheke Island in the Hauraki Gulf. He ran that school until 1991. Other tutors in the Waiheke school included the novelist Mike Johnson, script writer Neil Illingworth and the novelist and poet Daphne de Jong, author of 75 romance novels. Among the alumni of the Waiheke programme is food writer Annabel Langbein. Morrissey also taught creative writing in the University of Auckland's continuing education programme and through several Community Education Centres, and he was a tutor at the New Zealand Institute of Business Studies, Auckland between 2008 and 2010. He also offered creative writing classes at 10 Auckland secondary schools.

=== Reviewer ===
Between 2000 and 2013, Michael Morrissey contributed a monthly book review column to Investigate magazine (since renamed and reformatted as HIS/HERS). He has also reviewed books for Listener, Landfall, Islands, The Sunday Star-Times, the New Zealand Herald, The Press, Printout, and Quote Unquote.

Morrissey's survey of New Zealand poetry books published in 1992 appeared in the Journal of New Zealand Literature.

=== Journalism ===
Morrissey contributed feature articles and interviews to a number of magazines and newspapers, such as the Listener, Metro, The Sunday Star-Times, NZ Catholic, New Zealand Herald and other publications. For the Listener, he wrote articles about his encounters with Norman Mailer, Kurt Vonnegut and Saul Bellow among others. In Metro, he interviewed actors (such as Bruce Allpress) and politicians (eg, Douglas Graham).

In 1986 and 1987, Morrissey was employed as a feature writer on the New Zealand Herald. In 1967, he was editor of Craccum, the University of Auckland student newspaper.

=== Book launch incident ===
The launch of Morrissey's novella Terra Incognita 1526 on 12 June 1997 led to violence and four arrests. The novella told the story of the (fictional) arrival in New Zealand in 1526, of a Spanish ship. The ship's crew of conquistadores made friends with the Māori they encountered and helped them fight a rival iwi. Morrissey organised a re-enactment of the Spaniards' arrival in New Zealand, the greeting of them by local Māori.

Auckland novelist Graeme Lay, who attended the launch, described the incident in New Zealand Books Vol 28 No. 4 Issue 124. He wrote that a 53-foot boat was hired from the Maritime Museum. An historical hobbyist group called the Knights Draconis was recruited to play the conquistadores. A group from the Hoani Waititi Marae were hired to play the local Māori warriors.

Lay wrote: “... right on cue, there appeared the long boat, crammed with Spaniards, their helmets gleaming in the winter sunshine. The crowd buzzed with expectation. A Māori sentry blew a conch to signal the arrival of the strangers. ... But the war party did not appear... Instead, a solitary, bare-chested Maori man descended to the beach ... wielding a taiaha. As the ... Spaniards disembarked, the man rushed forward and began attacking them with his staff. The crowd was at first impressed; this was very realistic theatre. When the man began to whack the visitors more wildly, we became uneasy. ... Helmets flew off, blood spurted from the Spaniards' noses. This was not in the script ...”

The attacker also lunged at Morrissey who then called the police.

Graeme Lay reports that Morrissey recalled that he had been contacted by a kuia (whom he later learned was the veteran activist Titewhai Harawira) several days before the event to express concern about the launch. He had not acted on that warning. Lay quotes Morrissey as saying that his dismissive response may have led to the assault on the event.

Lay wrote: "Before the police arrived, the crowd on the foreshore became angry. Several of the Spaniards had been injured. People in the crowd ... were condemnatory of [the assault]. .... So, the launch of Terra Incognita 1526 turned out to be a lamentation more than a celebration. Books were bought, more in sympathy than enthusiasm. Nevertheless, 60 copies were sold at the launch, and extensive media coverage of the assault ensured that many more copies were sold after that".

Lay reports that the assailant, Arthur Harawira – Titewhai Harawira's son – told the television news “'If you say the Spaniards conquered us then you can take it up somewhere else.' Morrissey thinks: 'Harawira believed my book was a work of history, not a novel'”. Lay concluded "They don't launch them like that anymore".

The launch of Terra Incognita 1526 wasn't Morrissey's only attention-grabbing book launch; he once invited all the people he could track down with the name "Michael Morrissey" to the launch of one of his poetry books.

== Bibliography ==
=== Poetry ===
- Make Love in All the Rooms (1978), Caveman Press, Dunedin. ISBN 0 908562 75 6
- Closer to the Bone (1981), Sword Press, Christchurch. ISBN 0 9597596 0 3
- She's Not the Child of Sylvia Plath (1981), Sword Press, Christchurch. ISBN 0-9597596-1-1
- Dreams, (1981), Sword Press, Christchurch. ISBN 0-9597596-3-8
- Taking in the View (1986), Auckland University Press. ISBN 1-86940-004-6
- New Zealand – What Went Wrong? (1988), Van Guard Xpress, Auckland. ISBN 0-908836-02-3
- Dr Strangelove's Prescription (1988), Van Guard Xpress, Auckland. ISBN 0-908836-03-1
- A Case of Briefs (1989), Van Guard Xpress, Auckland. ISBN 0-908836-01-5
- The American Hero Loses His Tie (1989), Van Guard Xpress, Auckland. ISBN 0-908836-04-X
- From the Swimming Pool Question (2006), Zenith Publishing. ISBN 1-877365-36-X
- Memory Gene Pool (2012), Cold Hub Press, Governors Bay. ISBN 978-0-473-21916-1
- Poems from Hotel Middlemore (2018), Cold Hub Press, Governors Bay ISBN 978-0473-43853-1
- Poems about Iris the Coronavirus (2020), (light verse), Aries Press, Auckland ISBN 978-0-473-52114-1
- Tigers of the Mind (2023) Aries Press, Auckland ISBN 978-1-7386238-0-8

=== Short fiction ===
- The Fat Lady & The Astronomer (1981) Sword Press, Christchurch. ISBN 0 9597596 2 X
- Octavio's Last Invention (1991), Brick Row Publishing, Auckland. ISBN 0-908595-52-2

=== Novellas ===
- Paradise to Come (1997), Flamingo, Auckland. ISBN 1 86950 252 3 – containing: Terra Incognita 1526 and Captain Nemo's Child
- Heart of the Volcano (2000), BookCaster Press, Auckland, ISBN 0 473 06844 3

=== Novel ===
- Tropic of Skorpeo (2012), Steam Press, ISBN 978-0-9876635-3-5.

=== Memoir ===
- Taming the Tiger (2011), Polygraphia, Auckland. ISBN 978-1-877332-96-8

=== Non Fiction ===
- NZ's Top 10 (1993) Moa Beckett, Auckland. ISBN 1-86958-013-3

=== Edited ===
- The New Fiction (1985), Lindon Publishing, Auckland. ISBN 0-86470-016-4
- The Globe Tapes (1985) (with Mike Johnson and Rosemary Menzies), Hard Echo Press, Auckland. ISBN 0-908715-15-3
- The Flamingo Anthology of New Zealand Short Stories (2000), Flamingo, Auckland. ISBN 1-86950-335-X
- The Flamingo Anthology of New Zealand Short Stories – Extended Edition, (2004), Flamingo, Auckland. ISBN 1 86950 496 8

=== Stage plays ===
- Come Here Beethoven (1979). Performed at the University of Canterbury, Christchurch and the University of Otago, Dunedin.
- Exorcisms (1979). Performed at Theatre Corporate, Auckland.

=== Fiction anthology appearances ===
- All The Dangerous Animals Are in Zoos (1981)
- New Zealand Writing Since 1945 (1983)
- New Zealand Short Stories (4th Series) (1984)
- Listener Short Stories 3 (1984)
- The New Fiction (1985)
- I Have Seen the Future (1986)
- Metro Fiction (1987)
- Antipodes New Writing (1987)
- Short Story International (1987)
- Penguin Book of Contemporary New Zealand Short Stories (1989)
- Tabasco Sauce and Ice Cream (1990)
- The Oxford Book of New Zealand Short Stories (1992)
- Faber Book of Contemporary South Pacific Stories (1994)
- Rutherford's Dreams (1995)
- Beethoven's Ears (1995)
- 100 NZ Short Stories (1997)
- Flamingo Anthology of New Zealand Short Stories (2000)
- Author's Choice (2001)
- Essential New Zealand Short Stories (2002)
- Flamingo Anthology of New Zealand Short Stories Extended edition (2004)
- Sunday 22 (2006)
- Essential New Zealand Short Stories Second Edition (2009)
- 46 by 44 (2009)

=== Poetry anthology appearances ===
- Bright But Invisible edited by Jeremy Bartlett (1978)
- Te Awamutu Festival of the Arts (1979)
- The International Portland Review (1980)
- The Penguin Book of Contemporary New Zealand Poetry edited by Miriama Evans, Harvey McQueen and Ian Wedde (1989)
- Frosted Rails edited by Harry Ricketts and Janette Stace (1990)
- Auckland Live (1992)
- 100 New Zealand Poems edited by Bill Manhire (1993)
- Below the Surface: Protests at French Testing on Mururoa edited by Ambury Hall (1995)
- Big Weather: Poems of Wellington edited by Gregory O’Brien and Louise White (2000)
- Poems Selected by Lauris Edmond and Bill Sewell (2001)
- Spirit in a Strange Land: A Selection of New Zealand Spiritual Verse edited by Paul Morris, Harry Ricketts and Mike Grimshaw (2002)
- 121 New Zealand Poems edited by Bill Manhire (2005)
- Shards of Silver edited by Paul Thompson (2006)
- Poetry New Zealand 37 edited by Owen Bullock (2008)
- Auckland in Poetry, Just Another Anthology edited by Stu Bagby (2008)
- Voyagers: Science Fiction Poetry from New Zealand edited by Mark Pirie and Tim Jones (2009)
- Broadsheet 6 edited by Mark Pirie (2010)
- Live Lines Volume III (2010)
- Ice Diver New Zealand Poetry Society (2011)
- Live Lines Volume IV (2011)
- Poems 4 Peace edited by Gus Simonovic (2014)
- The Unexpected Greenness of Trees Caselberg Trust International Poetry Competition (2016)
- Forty Years of Titirangi Poets edited by Ron Riddell (2017)
- Cutting Through edited by Melanie Wittwer, Amanda Eason, Rachel Hughes, Robert Moore (2018)
- Poetry New Zealand Yearbook edited by Johanna Emeney (2020)
- This Twilight Menagerie – Poetry Live (2021)
- The Ultimate Reader of Love for the Book edited by Bill Direen (2021)

== Awards ==
- MacMillan Brown Prize (1977)
- Writer's Bursary (1977)
- Writer-in-Residence – University of Canterbury (1979)
- Tom-Gallon Trust Award (1979)
- Auckland Teachers Short Story award (judged by Bruce Mason) (1980)
- Fulbright Cultural Travel Award (1981)
- PEN Best First Book of Prose Award (1982)
- Sunday Star Times Short Story Competition (1984)
- Auckland Star-Air New Zealand short story competition (1985)
- Lilian Ida Smith Poetry Award (1986)
- Writer-in-Residence – University of Waikato (2012)

Morrissey was also awarded major project grants by Creative New Zealand in 1993 and 1998.
