= Carolyn Noll Sorg =

American academic administrator

27th President of John Carroll University
- Assuming office June 1, 2026
- Succeeding: Alan Miciak

Personal details
- Children: 2
- Education: Baldwin Wallace University; Columbia University; Miami University

Carolyn Noll Sorg is an American academic administrator and the president of John Carroll University. In December 2025, she was named the university's 27th president, a term effective June 1, 2026. Upon assuming office, she became the first woman and the third layperson to lead the institution in its history. She previously served as the university's vice president for enrollment and marketing.

== Early life and education ==
Noll Sorg is a native of Northeast Ohio and graduated from Independence High School in 2002. She comes from a working-class family. Her parents and grandparents worked as a boiler operator, registered nurse, autobody mechanic, and school bus driver. She was a first-generation college student.

She attended Baldwin Wallace University, where she worked as a tour guide in the admission office, an experience that introduced her to a career path in higher education. She graduated summa cum laude from Baldwin Wallace in 2006 with a B.A. in English. Noll Sorg earned a M.A. in higher education from Columbia University. In 2024, she completed a M.F.A. in experience design from Miami University. Her thesis was titled Radical Hospitality and the Campus Visit: A Case Study in Increasing Prospective Student Engagement. Dennis Cheatham was her thesis advisor.

== Career ==
Noll Sorg began her professional career at her alma mater, Baldwin Wallace University, where she worked as an admission counselor. She subsequently held administrative positions at the University of Akron and Barnard College. From 2013 to 2017, she served as the director of admission and deputy chief enrollment officer at Ursuline College.

Following her work on university campuses, Noll Sorg joined the College Board, working in its BigFuture division. As the director of recruitment and enrollment success management, she consulted with more than 1,500 colleges and universities.

In 2023, Noll Sorg was appointed vice president for enrollment management at John Carroll University. She was promoted to vice president for enrollment and marketing in 2024. In this expanded role, she was responsible for admissions, student enrollment and financial services, enrollment operations, enrollment communications, and all university marketing. Her appointment to the position was part of a leadership reorganization at the university that coincided with the departure of Ryan Daly to serve as president of the foundation for Corewell Health East.

During her tenure as a vice president, Noll Sorg oversaw the university's largest increase in first-year enrollment of the century. Her initiatives contributed to a 43 percent increase in out-of-state student enrollment beginning in 2023. She secured $7 million in philanthropic funding for the university's "Go National" strategy and helped drive the development of "Onward," a career-readiness program scheduled to launch in late 2026.

In December 2025, John Carroll University announced Noll Sorg would become its 27th president, succeeding the retiring Alan Miciak. When her presidency begins on June 1, 2026, she will be the first woman and the third layperson to hold the office in the university's 139-year history. Upon assuming the role, she is also set to join the board of the Association of Jesuit Colleges and Universities.

== Personal life ==
Noll Sorg is married to Brendan Sorg, who holds a senior leadership position at The MetroHealth System. They have two children. The family plans to reside on the John Carroll University campus.
