= Jan Kemp (writer) =

New Zealand writer (born 1949)

Jan Kemp MNZM
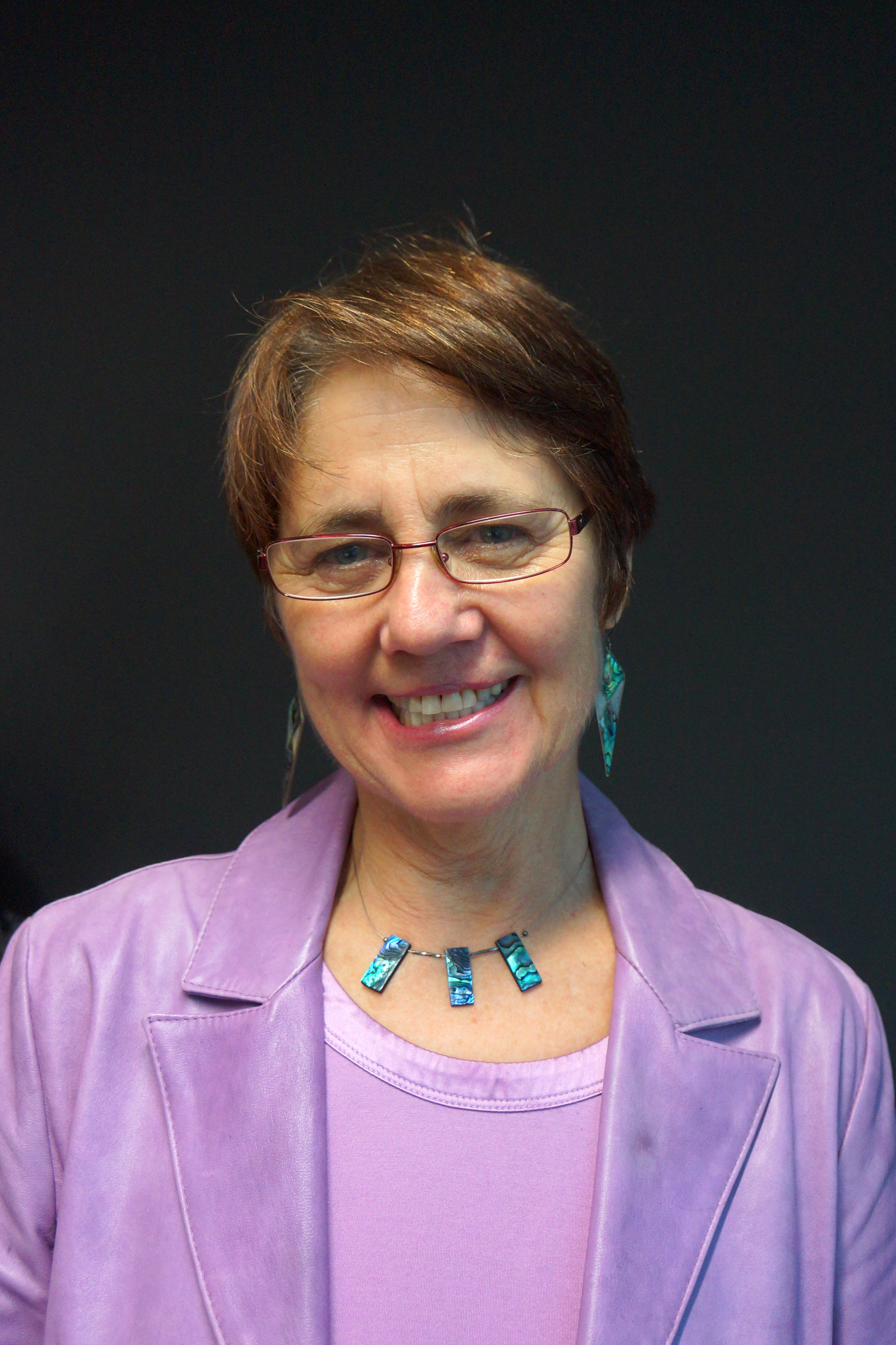
- Kemp in 2012
- Born: Janet Mary Kemp; 12 March 1949 (age 77); Hamilton, New Zealand
- Education: Pakūranga College; University of Auckland (MA)
- Occupations: Poet; short story writer; memoirist
- Spouse: Dieter Riemenschneider

Janet Mary Riemenschneider-Kemp MNZM (born 12 March 1949) is a New Zealand poet, short story writer, memoirist and public performer of her work. Her writing career began in the late 1960s and early 1970s and has continued into the 21st century, with ten published collections; her poems often focus on personal and intimate subjects. Her poems also reflect her international travel experiences, including periods spent teaching English as a foreign language.

In addition to her poems, Kemp has also published short stories, two novellas, and two memoirs. Since 2008 she has lived in Kronberg im Taunus, Germany, where she sings in the St Johann choir.

== Early life and education ==
Kemp was born in Hamilton on 12 March 1949. The family moved to Morrinsville before she was one, and subsequently to Auckland when she was 13, where she attended Pakūranga College. It was at Pakūranga College that Kemp was encouraged in her poetry writing by an English teacher, whom she describes as her first mentor.

Kemp graduated from the University of Auckland with a Master of Arts in English in 1974. She gained a Diploma in Teaching from Auckland Teachers' College in 1972, and an RSA Certificate, British Council, Hong Kong (Teacher of English as a Foreign Language) in 1984. In 1974, while studying at the University of Auckland, she and two other members of the English department collected and published the first cassette series of recorded New Zealand poetry. She spent a year teaching primary school before beginning her master's degree.

== Career ==
=== Poetry ===
Kemp began contributing to the poetry magazine The Word is Freed (usually abbreviated to Freed) in the late 1960s. The magazine had been established in 1968 by a group of poets at the University of Auckland; Kemp was one of the few women who performed poetry with the group, and one of only two women to have poems accepted by the magazine. She was also the only woman poet whose work was included in the 1973 anthology The Young New Zealand Poets edited by Arthur Baysting.

Kemp's first volume of poetry, Against the Softness of Women, was published in 1976 by Caveman Press. Kemp says in her memoir Raiment (2022) that she had written all the poems and submitted them to the publisher by 1972, but that he "stalled on releasing it for some years, as he wasn't certain a book solely by a woman poet would sell". Academic Janet Wilson, writing in The Oxford Companion to New Zealand Literature, notes that despite Kemp's prominence as a woman poet at this time, "she has never been an overtly feminist writer"; many of her poems focus on the self and the "illuminations that the challenge to discover intimacy can bring". In 1977, her poems were included in Private Gardens, an anthology of New Zealand women poets edited by Riemke Ensing; Peter Simpson described Kemp's poetry as standing out for its "erotic directness and delicacy".

In winter 1979, Kemp toured New Zealand as part of the 'Gang of Four' poetry tour, with Sam Hunt, Alistair Campbell and Hone Tuwhare. Once again the only woman, Kemp was described in the programme published by the New Zealand Students' Art Council as "the youngest — and prettiest? — of the four poets on tour". During the tour they gave public readings, visited schools and universities, and visited Parliament.

Kemp's poems are often influenced by her world travels. Between 1974 and 1978 Kemp travelled overseas in the Pacific Islands, Australia, Canada and Malaysia. Her second collection, Diamonds and Gravel (1979) contained a number of the poems that she wrote on these travels. In the 1980s, she worked as a teacher of English as a foreign language at the University of Papua, Papua New Guinea (1980–1982), the University of Hong Kong (1982–1985), and the National University of Singapore (1985). In 1980, she was the Queen Elizabeth II Arts Council Poetry Representative at the South Pacific Festival of Arts in Papua New Guinea. The Other Hemisphere (1992) was described in the New Zealand Review of Books as "very well-travelled writing, crossing continents to base itself in foreign universities, making affectionate allusions to other writers".

In 2001 her poem "Elephant Riding" was selected for inclusion in Best New Zealand Poems. Her collection Only One Angel was also published in this year, and included illustrations of angels by Claudia Pond Eyley. Emma Neale, reviewing the collection, noted that "love is a guiding principle" of Kemp's poems, "an absolute that is as tangible as a rock or a tree", and said that Kemp's work is "very often expressive, lyrical, written from a fount of feeling".

Her 2006 collection Dante's Heaven was translated into German by her husband Dieter Riemenschneider under the title Dantes Himmel, and released as part of the 2012 Frankfurt Book Fair. It was also translated into Italian by Aldo Magnanino as Il Cielo di Dante. A review in The New Zealand Review of Books called it a "strong collection — dense, varied, occasionally arch, more often perceptive and affecting".

In 2012 her collection Voicetracks was published as a joint German and New Zealand publication. It is based around Kemp's life as a New Zealand expatriate in Germany, features Kemp's own photos as illustrations, and references the life and ideas of philosopher Walter Benjamin. Cliff Fell in Landfall says Kemp "seems to be inviting us to drill down into deeper mysteries, into events of the past that the places she depicts were once setting to, events which — as Benjamin suggests — can never, and perhaps should never, be fully understood". He concludes that the collection is a "collection of accomplished lyrics, on the whole, but it's an unsettling read, as though the poems haven’t quite settled into their new landscape".

In Poetry New Zealand, issue 48, Kemp discusses her poetic practice:

I still hear a line or lines or just a phrase in my head and have taught myself to listen, to let the words keep on coming; I chant them aloud, to remember them, say if out walking; when I can get to paper and pencil, I write them down. Later, I type them up into a text and spend time finessing them. I do the thinking work then, once I've seen what I've said or am trying to say. A poem can take years or a moment to write itself. The music or cadence of the line and its rhythm are of utter importance to me—the speaking voice of the poet in me who, if I'm lucky, sometimes speaks up.

Her tenth collection of poems, Dancing Heart: New & Selected Poems 1968-2024, was published in 2024, with an introduction by Jack Ross.

=== Other work ===
Kemp was the main founder of the Aotearoa New Zealand Poetry Sound Archive, launched in 2004. The archive is housed in the Special Collections at the University of Auckland Library and in the Alexander Turnbull Library, and features recordings of 171 New Zealand poets reading their work, and is accompanied by text files, photographs and bibliographical notes about the poets. Together with Jack Ross, Kemp has edited several collections of New Zealand poetry in performance, including Classic New Zealand Poets in Performance (2006), Contemporary NZ Poets in Performance (2007) and New New Zealand Poets in Performance (2008).

In 2022, Kemp published Raiment, her memoir of her life up to age 25. Stephanie Johnson praised Kemp's treatment of her university years, "a rollcall of many of the most well-known poets, artists and scholars of that generation", and Kemp's gift in "the stringing together of images to create an imagined or recalled world". Wendy Parkins, reviewing the memoir for Landfall, said Kemp "writes frankly and with an appealing humility about her uncertainties and false starts in both writing and relations", but also noted she would have liked Kemp to discuss in more detail what she thinks now about her life choices and why she became a poet. Steve Braunias in Newsroom called it "small but perfectly charming", and his review concludes:

With its sunny disposition, its bright idealism, and its neatly detailed settings (hippies in the bush in Titirangi, Friday night drinks hosted by Karl Stead at a bar on Constitution Hill), Raiment is a fascinating document of a young life lived in thrall to love and language.

In 2023, Kemp published her second memoir, To See a World, covering her life from 1974 to 1994.

== Honours and awards ==
In 1979, Kemp was awarded a New Zealand Literary Fund writer's bursary of $4,000. In 1991, Kemp was awarded a PEN-Stout Fellowship at Victoria University of Wellington.

In the 2005 Queen's Birthday Honours, Kemp was appointed a Member of the New Zealand Order of Merit, for services to literature.

In 2008, Kemp was a Writer in Residence at the Chateau de Lavigny, Switzerland.

== Personal life ==
Kemp's first marriage was at the age of 20 and did not last; she was divorced by her mid-20s. In 2007, Kemp moved to Germany with her husband, Dieter Riemenschneider; they had lived together in Frankfurt previously from 1994 to 1999 and at Torbay in NZ from 1999 to 2007. Since 2008 they have lived in Kronberg im Taunus, where Kemp is a member of the church choir.

== Selected works ==
=== Poetry ===
- Contributor to The Young New Zealand Poets (1973), edited by Arthur Baysting
- Against the Softness of Woman (1976)
- Contributor to Private Gardens: An Anthology of New Zealand Women Poets (1977), edited by Riemke Ensing
- Diamonds and Gravel (1979)
- The Other Hemisphere: Poems (1992)
- Ice-breaker Poems (1980) (pamphlet)
- Five Poems (1988)
- Only One Angel: Poems (2001)
- The Sky's Enormous Jug — Love Poems Old & New (2002)
- Dante's Heaven (2003), translated into German by Dieter Riemenschneider and published as Dantes Himmel (2012); translated into Italian by Aldo Magnanino and published as Il Cielo di Dante (2016)
- Nine Poems from Le Château de Lavigny (2010)
- Voicetracks (2012)
- Jennet's Poem: Wild Love (2012)
- Dancing Heart: New & Selected Poems 1968-2024 (2024)

=== Prose ===
- "Them Bulls", published in Landfall (1977)
- Raiment (memoir, 2022)
- To See a World (memoir, 2023)

=== As editor ===
- New Zealand Poets Read Their Work (1974)
- Classic New Zealand Poets in Performance (with Jack Ross, 2006)
- Contemporary NZ Poets in Performance (with Jack Ross, 2007)
- New New Zealand Poets in Performance (with Jack Ross, 2008)
