= Titus Books =

Titus Books may refer to:

- the books Titus Groan, Titus Alone and Titus Awakes in the Gormenghast series by Mervyn Peake
- Titus Books (publisher), an independent New Zealand publisher
