= The Bilders =

New Zealand music group

Bilders
- Also known as: Builders, Die Bilder (1980s)
- Origin: Christchurch, New Zealand
- Years active: 1980–present
- Labels: Unwucht; Zelle; South Indies; Powertool Records; Thokei Tapes; Flying Nun
- Members: Bill Direen

Bilders (or Builders) is a New Zealand music group of varying lineups that produced a string of self-recorded 7-inch vinyl releases between 1980 and 1982 leading to Beatin Hearts, the first studio-album from fledgling New Zealand independent record label 'Flying Nun Records'.

Known variously from pre-internet times as Die Bilder (German, for "The Pictures"), Bilderbergers, bilderine, Soluble Fish, Feast of Frogs, and High Thirties Piano, their alternative band names reflected a playfulness that challenged priority branding. The band does not maintain a steady profile. Months or years may pass without a performance, however 2018 was a prolific year for remastering and re-releases, with many live performances. New material of the spoken word and improvisation show Expendable Animals, however, was not recorded, unless on iPhones.

Labels such as Grapefruit, Carbon Records, Sophomore Lounge, Zelle Records (Austria), Unwucht (Germany), Grapefruit (USA), Siltbreeze (USA), Powertool (NZ) and SmartGuy (USA) have issued or reissued vinyl releases since 2010. Latest releases are two outstanding releases highlighted by American musicians Alex McManus (multi-instruments) and Matthew Swanson (bass), A vinyl reissue of 1984 LP Split Second, a vinyl remaster of 1994 CD "Cut", vinyl remaster of 2008 CD Chrysanthemum Storm, vinyl reissue and remaster of the 1982 recorded LP Beatin Hearts, a 7-inch EP of new songs Measly (Grapefruit, USA), 'Cell Songs' (on a vinyl compilation by SmartGuy Records), participation in two compilations of music by Dunedin (New Zealand) bands based on poems by Scottish poet Robert Burns (1759-1796) with Zelle Records, a spoken word side project Ferocious on (Rattle Records, and the original soundtrack of the film Bill Direen, A Memory of Others released by Sophomore Lounge.

Early to mid-career Bilders' material was known for 'rough' music making (often live in the studio), and a lo-fi recording style that has produced "many genuine classic compositions". The 1985 song "The Alligator Song" gained a cult following on New Zealand student radio stations. More recent compositions have been attempting to integrate lyrical and musical processes into true collaborative shaping. The last albums (Grapefruit/Sophomore Lounge, 2024) present 32 new songs from two different groups. The new material overruns geographical or national boundaries, having members from Canada, USA and NZ.

== Guests and collaborators ==
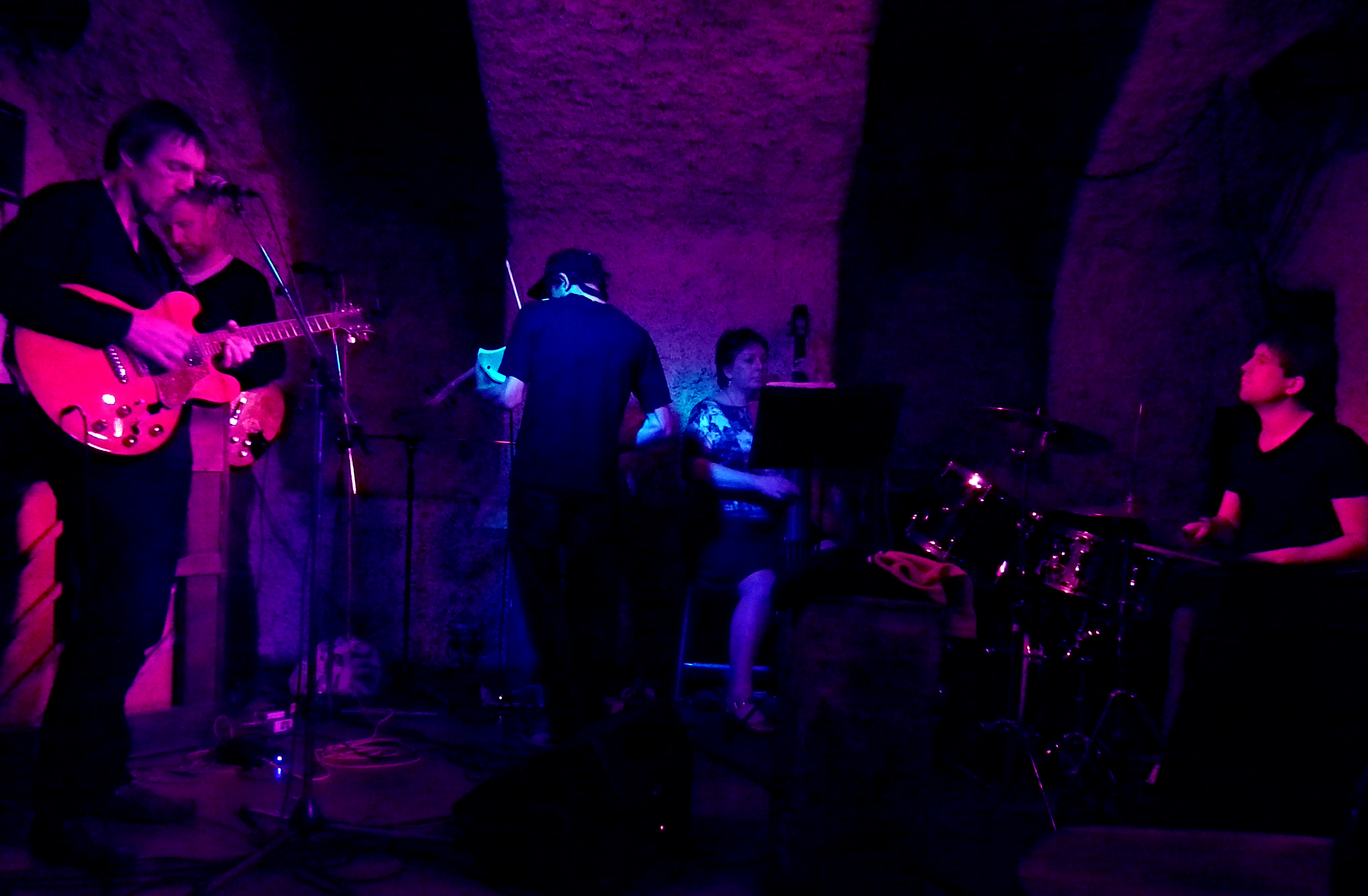
On tour in Vienna 2013

Many musicians have taken part in Bilders performances and recordings. In the 1980s co-workers included Bill Direen (consistent member), Campbell McLay, mastermind of the Onset Offset label (bass, 1980–82), members of The Terminals, Scorched Earth Policy and Victor Dimisich Band, along with other prime movers such as entrepreneur/composer Alastair Galbraith 1994, artist and guitarist Alec Bathgate (recording project, 1984), Chris Knox (recording and production, 1982) of Toy Love and Tall Dwarfs, and poet/performer Alan Brunton (opera project Comrade Savage on the life of Australian-born NZ politician Michael Joseph Savage) (Red Mole) and journalist Steve Braunias. Malcolm Grant was Bilders drummer (1980–82) before moving to The Bats.

Guests and collaborators are varied in musical styles and backgrounds. in 2018, a theatre-cabaret event with an important improvisational ingredient played in all the main centres in New Zealand with a flexible lineup. Key members were Stuart Porter (saxophone, improvisation guide), William Henry Meung (synthesiser), Alex Wolken (piano), Brendon Ryniker (drums, South Island), Steve Cournane (drums, Auckland), Susan Ellis (trumpet-cello, South Island), Pania Simmonds (bass, Dunedin), Greig Bainbridge (electric bass), with guests appearing "à l'improviste" in many centres. Co-musicians for a short tour of the state of Tennessee with an appearance at Cropped Out Festival in Kentucky were Nashville residents Matthew Swanson (bass) and Chris Davis (percussion). Other US collaborators have been members of Simon Joyner's Ghosts including Joyner himself, with Dave Nance and Chris Deden, and notably Alex McManus (2023-2025) who found in Bilders an outlet for his significant talent. Steve Cournane (percussion and drums) and Greig Bainbridge (bass), working with Stuart Porter of Primitive Art Group (saxophone) were among musicians essential to a Builders tour of New Zealand in 2016. After a ten-year break from the band, pianist Andrew McCully rejoined Builders in Auckland in 2019 to revive Songs for Michael Joseph Savage. In Wellington (NZ) Direen, guitarist/curator/founder of Marineville Mark Williams and poet/composer/percussionist Jo Contag formed a splinter group combining spoken word/poetry by Bill Direen, guitar loops/enrichment and drum patterns, known as Ferocious. Stuart Page (1983–85, 2010–present) can also be found in NZ lineups. Steve Cournane and Greig Bainbridge play regularly in NZ, expanding the repertoire to include rarer material. Various guests joined Bilders for a 2025 tour of New Zealand., with a surprise appearance by Peter Jefferies in Wellington.

The group has developed both American and European lineups. In the USA, Bill Direen has toured solo from West to East. In 1989, a six-member group recorded spontaneously at PPI studios in Manhattan, resulting in an album released on cassette, and later on vinyl. He was joined by Derek Champion (drums) for shows in 1994 and Hamish Kilgour for shows from 1989 to 2013. More recently (2018, 2019), American guests have joined the band to play small venues from Tennessee to Massachusetts.

Other past members include Berlin violinist TThomthom G'schrey (Germany, violin, 1997, 2006–present), Robbie Yeats (Dunedin, The Dead C, 2014, drums), David Watson (NYC, 2013, bagpipes, 335 semi-acoustic guitar), Miggy Littleton (Brooklyn, 2013, bass), Hamish Kilgour of The Clean (Brooklyn, 1989, 2013–14), David Wukitsevits of Austrian band Der Nino aus Wien (2013, drums), Jess McCann (Melbourne, accordion), Stuart Porter (saxophones, percussion), Louise Johns (Germany/Singapore, bass), Mark Williams (Wellington/Germany, guitar), Jo Contag (Wellington, drums), Barry Stockley (Wellington/Melbourne, bass and instrumentation, 1987, 2013), artist-guitarist Nikola Kapétanovic (2009–11, [France, electric guitar, dumbra, kalimba), dancer and actress France Herv] (France, 2010, chanteuse, actor), Kersten Ginsberg (Germany, drums, 1997), pianist, composer, improvisor, filmmaker Jonathan Crayford (Paris-NZ) – piano (2010–11, a special poetry-piano project), Rick And (2011, vocal), Peter Scott (2012, bass), Andrew McCully (piano, organ 2007-08, 2010, 13, 14) and Andrew Maitai (drums, 2008). Further groups have played or collaborated in Europe, USA, Australia and NZ; musicians include Jon Evans (Berlin, synthesiser, 2008, Berlin) and French DJ Fred Morvan (beatbox, 2008, Berlin). Since 2018 Direen has been working with Steve Cournane and others on improvised compositions in an old house in Otago (a cassette is expected in 2024), while collaborating with musicians in Wellington. In 2023-24 Direen worked intensively with multi-instrumentalist Alex McManus and bassist Matthew Swanson to create the albums Dustbin of Empathy and Neverlasting, released in May, 2024 and October 2025.

This list is not complete.

== Selected discography ==
Since the early 1980s, Bilders' music has been released on labels such as South Indies (NZ), Unwucht (Germany), SmartGuy (USA), Sophomore Lounge (USA), Thokei Tapes (Germany), Zelle Records (Austria), Grapefruit Record Club (USA), Onec Records (Plymouth UK), Siltbreeze (USA), Onset Offset (Christchurch NZ), Democrazy (Belgium), Powertool NZ [Auckland, CDs only 2006–2010], EMI, and Warner Bros Flying Nun.

- Neverlasting (vinyl LP) Grapefruit and Carbon Records. 2025.
- Dustbin of Empathy (vinyl LP) Grapefruit and Sophomore Lounge, 2024.
- Mindful (Thokei Tapes, cassette reissue, 2023). spoken word and songs recorded in Berlin in 2010. (Distributed from Europe or private distribution in NZ).
- Split Seconds (vinyl LP, Grapefruit and Sophomore Lounge co-production). 2022
- M.A.L.A (2021, Thokei Tapes) spoken and sung poems integrated in collaboration with musicians Steve Cournane and William Henry Meung. The full title of the release is Move Along, Love Among. The texts were published in a 26pp accompanying brochure. 2021.
- "A Memory of Others" 2019, double LP of all tracks that feature in the feature-length documentary, Bill Direen, A Memory of Others dir. by Simon Ogston. Sophomore Lounge SL100.
- Oh! 88, on "My Bonie Bell", Robert Burns compilation Volume 2 (Zelle Records). ZR008
- "Chrysanthemum Storm" vinyl 12" recorded 2008 Auckland (NZ). Zelle/Powertool/South Indies. Rerelease LP 2017. ZR010.
- "Cut" with artwork by Ronnie van Hout, rerelease 2018. Zelle Records/Powertool/South Indies. ZR011.
- There's a Youth in this City, on "Ae Fond Kisse", Burns compilation Volume 1 (Zelle Records). ZR004
- "Measly". Buildermash EP. Four tracks. Grapefruit Recs GY6-7.
- "Beatin Hearts". Builders. Reissue of remastered album of 1982. Grapefruit Recs GY6-1.
- "The Utopians". 7-inch 45 rpm vinyl & iTunes download. Studio recordings from Melbourne and Auckland, with a live extract (Austria). 2014. SmartGuy Records smart35.
- "Fiat Lux". Builders live recordings 1980-82. Democrazy Records DR 009.
- "The Flavour of the Meat". 2013. 12-inch vinyl. 33 rpm. Grapefruit Record Club. GY3-3.
- "New York Songs". 2013. 12-inch vinyl. 33 rpm. Unwucht. UN015
- Bilders Live. Tour merchandise CD. South Indies. 2012.
- "Wonders". 7-inch lathe. OneC Records. Plymouth, UK. 2012.
- High 30s Piano. (Live studio recordings, 1981-2). 2012. Unwucht. UN013
- Soloman's Ball. 2012. 12-inch vinyl (from the quality studio recordings of 1981). Unwucht. UN09
- Six Impossible Things. 2012. 12-inch vinyl (from the quality studio recordings of 1980-81). Unwucht. UN07
- Vacuum, two 7-inch vinyl releases from the cult Philadelphia label from cassettes of early (1978–79) group Vacuum (Peter Stapleton, Steve Cogle, Peter Fryer, Allen Meek, Brendan Arnold). (Siltbreeze, 2011, 2012). Of these only the second remains in production.
- Above Ground. Siltbreeze. Philadelphia, US. LP. Vinyl (from cassette of 1983). 2011.
- Krypton 10. 12" double vinyl album includes BD collabs with Onset-Offset stable in Christchurch c. 1980-82; taken partly from 20 Solid Krypton Hits (above). Unwucht, Augsburg, Germany. 2011
- Parisian Friday. CD (jewel case). Non-studio recordings (gallery openings, practices). 2010. Bilders Paris Sessions (w. Nikola Kapétanovic). Powertool Music.
- Flying Nun Box Set (Alligator Song). Limited period usage. Warner Bros. 2007.
- Divina Comedia. LP vinyl compilation of Builders material 1980-88). South Indies. 1989.
- Life in Bars. Bill Direen and Barry Stockley. 12-inch vinyl. 45 rpm. South Indies. 1987.
- The Cup. Builders. 12-inch vinyl. 45 rpm. South Indies. 1987. (w. John McDermott, Stuart Porter, Bainbridge, Holdorf).
- Let's Play. Builders. 12-inch LP vinyl. South Indies. 1986. (w. Bainbridge, Tony Green, Karl Holdorf. Incl. a Vacuum archive song).
- CoNCH3. Builders. 12-inch LP vinyl. South Indies. 1985. (w. Page, Bainbridge, various).

== Films ==
Bill Direen, A Memory of Others 2017. 87 mins. Director/producer/editor Simon Ogston. Photography, Jeff Smith, Simon Ogston. With Nick Bollinger, Stephen Cogle, Marie Direen, David Eggleton, Ferocious, Hamish Kilgour, Lisa Samuels, Peter Stapleton.

Numerous music videos, notably The Alligator Song, directed by Peter Bannon (1985), and Russian Rug, cinematography by Ronnie van Hout (1982).
