= Mike Johnson (author) =

New Zealand author and creative writing teacher

Michael Oliver Johnson (born 1947) is a New Zealand author and creative writing teacher. He has written thirteen novels, eleven books of poetry, several short stories featured in critically acclaimed anthologies, and three children's books. Johnson has been awarded two literary fellowships in New Zealand, one with the University of Canterbury, and one with the University of Auckland. His novel Dumb Show won the Buckland Memorial Literary Award for fiction in 1997. He is also a founder of Lasavia Publishing Ltd, a publishing house created in Waiheke Island, New Zealand.

Johnson's prose contains elements of magic realism and science fiction.

== Early life ==
Johnson grew up in Hinds, a small, rural town about 12 miles south of Ashburton, New Zealand. The rugged, sparsely populated landscape of his childhood is a feature in his novel Dumb Show. He attended the University of Canterbury, earning a degree in Political Science in 1971. He travelled around Europe and North Africa before returning to New Zealand in the late 1970s, when he began to focus on his writing.

== Career ==
Johnson's writing career was launched with his first book of poetry, The Palanquin Ropes, which co-won the John Cowie Reid Memorial Competition in 1981. This prestigious literary award has been won by writers such as Alistair Paterson and Cilla McQueen. In 1986, Johnson's first novel, Lear – The Shakespeare Company Plays Lear at Babylon, was shortlisted for the New Zealand Book Awards.

Johnson has been the recipient of a number of awards and creative writing grants from 1985 to 2002. To date, he has written eight novels, two collections of shorter fiction, one non-fiction, one children's title and six poetry collections, in addition to having various works selected for literary anthologies.

Mike Johnson's teaching career spans over twenty years. Since the late 80s, he has taught creative writing in a variety of institutions and circumstances, at both undergraduate and graduate level. From 2008 to 2020, he taught a Master of Creative Writing course at the Auckland University of Technology (AUT). In addition, he is involved in a publishing company, Lasavia Publishing Ltd, in partnership with his wife, Leila Lees.

== Critical reception ==
Because of its mixed genre nature, Johnson's work is not considered a part of mainstream New Zealand literature. His novels and poetry have, however, received a positive response from the critics.

Dr David Dowling, writing in the prestigious Landfall magazine on Johnson's first novel, Lear, comments: 'Johnson makes an original contribution to the literature of disaster, and certainly to the nation's literature that still struggles beneath the mantle of social realism; he does it by the sheer intensity of his poetic vision, combined with an adroit metafictional sense ... In this fallen world, does falling matter? Johnson's novel is an exuberant, artful meditation on this question.'

Commenting on his 2011 novel, Travesty, Jodie Dalgleish writes, '(Johnson) has achieved a kind of 'worldmaking' [...] that confirms his position as one of New Zealand's most important fiction writers.'

Siobhan Harvey, prominent poet and critic, writes about Johnson's last book of poetry, To Beatrice Where We Cross the Line, 'A skilled practitioner at whatever literary craft he turns his hand to...Johnson is a writer at one with the word, its power, its airy finesses and everyday solidities, its resourcefulness, its craft.'

Writing in the New Zealand Herald on Johnson's critically well-received English to English translations of the Dang Dynasty poet, Li He (The Vertical Harp – the selected poems of Li He) writer and critic Iain Sharp wrote: 'Mike Johnson is the most underrated of all living New Zealand authors. Sometimes gothic, sometimes lyrical, sometimes both at once, his output over the past three decades has been extraordinary. Yet much of his fiction and most of his poetry has slipped by, barely reviewed...'

Following the successful reception of his dystopian fiction novel Driftdead, in December 2021, Johnson was featured in North & South Magazine. Paul Little described the book as, 'a door-stopping piece of dystopian fiction whose large and colourful cast includes the zombie-like driftdead of the title.'

Well known, contemporary writer, Witi Ihimaera, has described Johnson as 'One of the most innovative, original and fearless writers I know.'

== Literary works ==
=== Novels ===
- Lear: The Shakespeare Company Plays Lear at Babylon, Hard Echo Press, Auckland, 1986
- Antibody Positive, Hard Echo Press, Auckland, 1986
- Foreigners: Three Novellas, Penguin Books: Auckland, 1991
- Lethal Dose, Hard Echo Press: Auckland, 1991
- Dumb Show, Longacre Press: Dunedin, 1996
- Counterpart, Harper Collins: Sydney, 2001
- Stench, Hazard Press: Christchurch, 2004
- Travesty, Titus Books: Auckland, 2010 (reprinted 2016)
- Hold my Teeth While I Teach you to Dance, Lasavia Publishing Ltd: Auckland, 2014
- Back in the Day, Lasavia Publishing Ltd: Auckland, 2015
- Confessions of a Cockroach and Headstone, two novellas published together, Lasavia Publishing Ltd: Auckland, 2017
- Zombie in a Spacesuit, Lasavia Publishing Ltd: Auckland, 2018
- Driftdead, Lasavia Publishing Ltd: Auckland, 2020

=== Poetry ===
- The Palanquin Ropes, Voice Press: Wellington, 1983
- From a Woman in Mt Eden Prison & Drawing Lessons, Hard Echo Press: Auckland, 1984
- Standing Wave. Hard Echo Press: Auckland, 1985
- Mary Mouse, Manuscript of Children's Poetry, broadcast on Radio New Zealand national radio, 1991
- Treasure Hunt, Auckland University Press: Auckland, 1996
- The Vertical Harp: selected poems of Li He, Titus Books: Auckland, 2007
- To Beatrice Where We Crossed The Line, Second Avenue Press: Auckland, 2014
- Two Lines and a Garden, with Leila Lees. Lasavia Publishing Ltd: Auckland, 2017
- Ladder with No Rungs, with Leila Lees. Lasavia Publishing Ltd: Auckland, 2019
- The Toy Box, Part One of "The Raising Light Trilogy", Lasavia Publishing Ltd: Auckland, 2020
- Hide Your Eyes: The Rumi Poems, Part Two of "The Raising Light Trilogy", Lasavia Publishing Ltd: Auckland, 2020
- Extinction Rebellion, Part Three of "The Raising Light Trilogy", Lasavia Publishing Ltd: Auckland, 2020

=== Children's ===
- Taniwha, Illustrated by Jennifer Rackham, Lasavia Publishing, first published in 2015 with a bilingual Te Reo (Maori) edition released in 2016
- Kenny and the Roof Slide, illustrated by Jennifer Rackham, Lasavia Publishing, 2018
- Flippity Fluppity Flop, illustrated by Leila Lees, Lasavia Publishing, 2021

=== Non-fiction ===
- Dialogue, A text for senior English, Co-author with A.T. Johnson, Whitcombe and Tombs: Christchurch 1973
- The Angel of Compassion, Lasavia Publishing Ltd: Auckland, 2014

=== Anthologised poetry ===
- The New Poets, Initiatives in New Zealand Poetry, Murray Edmond & Mary Paul (Editors), Allen & Unwin NZ Limited/Port Nicholson Press, 1987
- Essential New Zealand Poems, Siobhan Harvey, Harry Ricketts and James Norcliffe (Editors), Penguin, 2014

=== Anthologised short stories ===
- 'The Woman of Tuscany House', Erotic Writing, Edited by Sue McCauley and Richard Mc Lachlan, Penguin: 1992
- 'The Harmony of the Swine', Tart and Juicy, Edited by Michael Gifkins, Vintage: 1994
- 'Rutherford's Dream', Rutherford's Dreams, Edited by Warwick Bennett and Patrick Hudson, IPL: 1995
- 'When That Shark Bites', Men Love Sex, Edited by Alan Close, Vintage: Australia, 1995
- 'Teledildonics', Lust, Edited by Michael Gifkins, Vintage: 1995
- 'The Fohn Effect', Antipodean Tales, Edited by Geoff Churchman, IPL: 1996
- 'Towards the bottom of the garden, the plum blossom shows pink', One hundred Short Short Stories, Edited by Graeme Lay, Tandem: 1998
- 'Frames', Nine New Zealand Novellas, Peter Simpson, Reed Publishing (NZ) Ltd, 2005
- 'The Wedding of Psyche', The myth of the 21st Century, Edited by Tina Shaw and Jack Ross, Reed Publishing: 2006
- 'A visit to Te Wharau Bay: A Conversation at the End of the World', The Best New Zealand Fiction # 6, Edited by Owen Marshall, Random House: 2009
- 'The Coming of the Gray Ghost', Scorchers, Edited by Paul Mountfort, Eunoia Press, 2021

== Awards and honours ==
- 1981 – Co winner of the John Cowie Reid Memorial Competition for a long poem or sequence of poems, with The Palanquin Ropes
- 1982 – Poetry Prize: Te Awamutu Festival of the Arts
- 1986 – Lear – The Shakespeare Company Plays Lear At Babylon shortlisted for New Zealand Book Awards
- 1987 – University of Canterbury Literary Fellowship (Writer in Residence)
- 1997 – Buckland Memorial Literary Award for the novel Dumb Show
- 1999 – Francis Keane Award for best short story, Magic Strings
- 2002 – University of Auckland Literary Fellowship
- 2002 – Nominated for the Sir Julius Vogel Award for the novel Counterpart
- 2006 – Wellington composer Carol Shortis wins the Philip Neil Memorial Prize with a song entitled 'The riddle of her flight' with the lyrics of a poem from Mike Johnson's book Treasure Hunt
