= Michael D. Johnson =

American academic

Michael Johnson

25th President of John Carroll University
- In office June 1, 2018 – June 1, 2021
- Preceded by: Robert L. Niehoff
- Succeeded by: Alan Miciak

Personal details
- Education: University of Wisconsin-Madison (BS); University of Chicago (MBA, PhD)

Michael D. Johnson is Dean Emeritus and E.M. Statler Professor Emeritus at the Nolan School of Hotel Administration, SC Johnson College of Business, Cornell University. He is also Marketing Department Chair at the Wisconsin School of Business, University of Wisconsin-Madison. He was previously the D. Maynard Phelps Professor of Business Administration and Professor of Marketing at the Stephen M. Ross School of Business at the University of Michigan, Dean and E.M. Statler Professor of Hotel Administration at Cornell University School of Hotel Administration, Provost and Professor of Marketing at Babson College, and President of John Carroll University.

Professor Johnson’s research focuses on customer satisfaction and loyalty, marketing strategy, and innovation. He is the author of six books, including Customer Portfolio Management: Creating Value with a Large Leaky Bucket of Customers (2025, MIT Press) and over 100 academic articles and technical reports.

== Early life and education ==
Michael Johnson was born on January 26, 1956 in Bottineau, ND and raised in Madison, WI. He earned his Bachelor of Science from the University of Wisconsin–Madison. He later earned both his Ph.D. and Master of Business Administration from University of Chicago.

== Professorships ==
Until July 2006, Johnson was the D. Maynard Phelps Collegiate Professor of Business Administration and professor of marketing at the Stephen M. Ross School of Business at the University of Michigan.

== Cornell ==
On May 4, 2005, the Cornell School of Hotel Administration announced that they had hired Mr. Johnson. He took the post in July 2006.

== John Carroll ==
On June 1, 2018 Michael D. Johnson became the 25th president in John Carroll's history. The University's Board of Directors had previously elected him to the position on December 6, 2017. On September 6, 2018 he was formally installed as president, but on June 1, 2021 he stepped down from this role.
