= Michael Johnston =

Michael Johnston may refer to:

- Michael Johnston (actor) (born 1996), American actor
- Michael Johnston (Australian footballer) (born 1971), former Hawthorn AFL footballer
- Mike Johnston (Colorado politician) (born 1974), mayor of Denver, Colorado
- Michael Johnston (Welsh footballer) (born 1987), Welsh footballer and player-manager
- Mike Johnston (baseball) (born 1979), American baseball player
- Mike Johnston (drummer) (born 1976), American drummer
- Mike Johnston (ice hockey) (born 1957), NHL coach
- Mikey Johnston (born 1999), Irish footballer
- Mike Johnston (Kansas politician) (born 1945), Kansas state senator and cabinet secretary

== See also ==
- Michael Johnson (disambiguation)
