= Lilian Ida Smith Award =

New Zealand literary award

- Date: 1986 -->
- Country: New Zealand
- Hosted by: New Zealand Society of Authors
- Reward: NZ$3,000
- Website: Official website

The Lilian Ida Smith Award also known as the NZSA Lilian Ida Smith Award is a New Zealand literary award from the New Zealand Society of Authors. The award is named after Lilian Ida Smith, a music teacher from Whanganui. She granted the New Zealand Society of Authors funds to ‘assist people aged 35 yrs and over to embark upon or further a literary career’.

From 1986–1990 the award consisted of three categories, poetry, fiction and non-fiction, with each recipient awarded $1000. From 1992 the award became biennial award with a prize fund of $3000 for a project in any genre, while after 2017 it was awarded every three years and from 2024 every four years.

Between 1986 and 1990 recipients of the award were:

Year	Poetry	Fiction	Non-fiction
1985	Michael Morrissey	Owen Marshall	Daphne de Jong
1987	Lauris Edmond	Bill Manhire	Rosemary Wildblood
1988	Mavis Wentworth	Owen Marshall	Graeme Lay
1989	Bill Manhire	Michael Gifkins	Elizabeth Smither
1990	Jan McAllum	James Norcliffe	Greg Newbold

From 1992 the recipients of the award are:

Year	Winner
1992	Debra Daley
1994	Joy McKenzie
1996	Katrina Willoughby
1998	Carolyn McCurdie
2000	Jackie Davis
2003	Mary McCallum
2005	Rachael King
2008	Sue Orr
2009	Leanne Radojkovich
2011	John MacKinven
2015	Caroline Barron
2017	Paula Harris
2020	Safia Archer
