= Jackie Davis (writer) =

New Zealand author, poet, and playwright

- Born: 1963 (age 62–63); New Plymouth, New Zealand
- Education: Victoria University of Wellington
- Writing career
- Language: English
- Genres: Fiction, poetry

Jackie Davis (born 1963) is a New Zealand author, poet, and playwright.

Davis was born in 1963 in New Plymouth, New Zealand and grew up in Taranaki. She worked as a registered nurse until 2001, when she became a professional writer.

Davis graduated with an MA in creative writing from the International Institute of Modern Letters at Victoria University of Wellington, studying under Bill Manhire.

In 2002 Davis published her first novel, Breathe, and her second, Swim, in 2003. She was included in Graeme Lay's The New Zealand Book of the Beach 2 and has been published in literary journals including the New Zealand Listener, Takahe, Metro and the Australian School Magazine. Davis is also a playwright, including writing and directing Whether I Fall and A Time Like This (first performed at Gisborne Unity Theatre in 2017).

Davis has won the 2000 Lilian Ida Smith Award and the 2005–2006 NZSA Foxton Fellowship (now Peter & Dianne Beatson Fellowship). In 2003 she received a grant from Creative New Zealand to complete her third novel.
