= Debra Daley =

New Zealand author

- Born: New Zealand
- Education: University of Auckland
- Website: Official website

Debra Daley is a New Zealand author.

Daley was born in New Zealand and is of Irish heritage. She grew up in the west of Auckland and graduated from the University of Auckland with an MA in English Literature. She currently lives in the Bay of Plenty.

Daley has worked as journalist, in public health, and as a screenwriter, working on the television dramas Universal Drive, The Shadow Trader, At the End of the Day, Pristine.

Daley has published three novels, The Revelations of Carey Ravine (2016), Turning the Stones (2014), and The Strange Letter Z (1996). The Revelations of Carey Ravine and Turning the Stones are both historical fiction, set in 18th-century England and Ireland. Her first novel, The Strange Letter Z, takes place in Mexico and New Zealand in the 1980s. She has also published a number of short stories.

In 1992 she won the Lilian Ida Smith Award. She received the Grimshaw-Sargeson Fellowship in 2013 with Toa Fraser. In 2005 she was awarded the Creative New Zealand Louis Johnson New Writers’ Bursary.
