= SmartGuy =

American record label

SmartGuy is an American record label. It has released bands from the UK, US, Australia and New Zealand. Releases include The Tyrades, Total Control, Billy Childish, Thee Headcoats, Dan Melchior, and Bill Direen. The label has been described as "seriously diverse" and "delving into divergent sounds and coming up with some real treats".

== Selected discography ==
- The Bilders "The Utopians R Just Out Boozin'". 7-inch 45 rpm vinyl & iTunes download. Recordings from Melbourne and Auckland, with a live extract (Austria). 2014. SmartGuy Records smart 035.
- "Ninety to the Dozen", a digital comp of the Australian 7-inches ( Total Control, Boomgates, Rat Columns and Soviet Valves )
- Division Four 12-inch EP 1983 Demo Cassette. Six songs of post-punk. The sounds of 1983 Perth, Australia.
- Total Control "Paranoid Video" 7-inch
- Boomgates "Layman's Terms" 7-inch
- Soviet Valves 7-inch EP
- Russell St. Bombings LP – debut full-length by Melbourne, Australia's New Sensations (out 24 Feb 2015)
