= Alan Miciak =

26th President of John Carroll University
- Incumbent
- Assumed office June 1, 2021
- Preceded by: Michael D. Johnson

Personal details
- Education: Kent State University (BA, PhD); University of Toledo (MBA)

Alan R. Miciak is the 26th and current President of John Carroll University. Formerly, he was the Dean of the John M. and Mary Jo Boler College of Business at John Carroll University. Under Miciak's leadership, the Boler College of Business ranked #1 in the nation by Bloomberg Businessweek's 2016 "Best Undergraduate Business Schools" Employer Survey.

== Early life and education ==
Miciak earned a B.A. (Business Administration) from Kent State University. He later earned a Master of Business Administration from the University of Toledo, and a Doctor of Philosophy (Marketing and International Business) from Kent State University.

== Career ==
Until 2002, Miciak was Director, Haskayne-Alberta Executive MBA Program at the University of Calgary, Canada. Until August 2005, he served as Dean of the Sobey School of Business at Saint Mary's University in Halifax, Nova Scotia. Miciak served as dean of the Duquesne University Palumbo and Donahue School of Business from 2005 to 2013. He launched Duquesne's "Sustainability MBA," ranked in the Top 10 MBA programs by the Aspen Institute in 2007/8 for integrating social and environmental issues into an MBA. Miciak was named as one of the "100 Most Influential People in Finance" by Treasury and Risk Magazine in 2008.

== John Carroll ==
The John Carroll University's Board of Directors elected Alan R. Miciak the 26th president in John Carroll's history on March 10, 2021. On April 7, 2025, Miciak announced his intention to retire after the 2026 school year.
