= Carolyn McCurdie =

New Zealand poet and author

- Born: England
- Writing career
- Notable awards: Lilian Ida Smith Award, First prize New Zealand Poetry Society’s International Poetry Competition

Carolyn McCurdie is a British-born New Zealand author.

McCurdie was born in England and moved to New Zealand in 1950, aged three. She grew up in Dunedin and has also lived in Auckland, Waiheke Island, and Australia.

McCurdie has worked as a teacher and librarian at the Blueskin Bay library. In 2002 she was mentored by Sue McCauley.

In 2012 McCurdie published her first novel for young adults, The Unquiet. She published Albatross, a collection of short stories in 2006, and a poetry collection, Bones in the Octagon, in 2015. McCurdie has also been published in Landfall and Takahē, and her work has appeared on Radio New Zealand.

== Awards ==
McCurdie received the 1998 Lilian Ida Smith Award. Her first novel, The Unquiet was named as one of Storylines Trust's Notable New Zealand Children's and Young Adult Books of 2007.

In 2013 she won first prize in the New Zealand Poetry Society's International Poetry Competition with Making Up the Spare Beds for the Brothers Grimm. Her poem Bridge received a highly commended in the 2017 Caselberg Trust International Poetry Prize, and she also received a highly commended in the 2012 prize.
