= Michael Gifkins =

New Zealand literary agent, publisher and author

- Born: 1945
- Died: 29 July 2014 (aged 68–69)
- Occupation: Literary agent; short story writer; critic; publisher; editor
- Genre: Short stories
- Notable awards: Katherine Mansfield Menton Fellowship (1983); Lilian Ida Smith Award (1989)

Michael Gifkins (1945 – 29 July 2014) was a New Zealand literary agent, short story writer, critic, publisher and editor. Having written three collections of short stories himself in the 1980s, Gifkins later represented a number of leading New Zealand writers, including Lloyd Jones. After his death, the New Zealand Society of Authors established the Michael Gifkins Prize for an Unpublished Novel which is awarded annually.

== Life and career ==
Gifkins was born in Wellington, New Zealand, in 1945. He attended the University of Auckland where he later taught English literature.

As literary agent, Gifkins represented a number of leading New Zealand writers, including Lloyd Jones and Greg McGee. As Jones' literary agent, Gifkins played a major role in the international success of both the novel and film of Jones' novel Mister Pip.

Gifkins wrote three short-story collections: After the Revolution (1982), Summer Is the Côte d'Azur (1987) and The Amphibians (1989). His stories appeared in a number of New Zealand literary journals including Landfall and Islands, and in 1984 one of his stories featured in Some Other Country: New Zealand's best stories, an anthology edited by Bill Manhire and Marion McLeod. He also edited and published a number of anthologies, beginning with The Gramophone Room (with C. K. Stead in 1983) and Listener Short Stories 3 (1984), and including Through The Looking Glass (1988), in which he collected the childhood recollections of 20 well-known New Zealanders.

In 1982, Owen Marshall reviewed Gifkins' first collection for The Press. He described Gifkins' writing as having a contemporary, modern focus, with several of the stories dealing with "the questing, mobile lifestyle of young adults". he also noted that the stories had an authentic New Zealand character and setting. In a review of Gifkins' second collection, Marshall described Gifkins as "that rare creature among contemporary writers — the short story specialist" and noted that his short stories often featured "wit and urbanity", but also "a sense of individual distance which is almost sadness".

In 1985 Gifkins was the Katherine Mansfield Memorial Fellow in Menton, France. He described it as his "first taste" of an OE (overseas experience), and used the time to work on his third short story collection.

Gifkins was the Writer-in-Residence at the University of Auckland in 1983, and won the Lilian Ida Smith Award for fiction in 1989. He was a member of the New Zealand Society of Authors (PEN NZ Inc) from 1982 until his death. He died on 29 July 2014.

== Legacy ==
The Michael Gifkins Prize for an Unpublished Novel has been awarded annually by the New Zealand Society of Authors since 2018. The recipient receives a publishing contract from Text Publishing and an advance in the value of NZ$10,000.

Michael Heywood of Text Publishing said of Gifkins: "[He] was kind, wise and generous. A gifted writer himself, he was a fine agent, and completely committed to the cause of New Zealand literature. He loved his writers. He challenged them, spurred them on, and caught them when they fell".
