= Michael Johnson (Alaska official) =

American politician

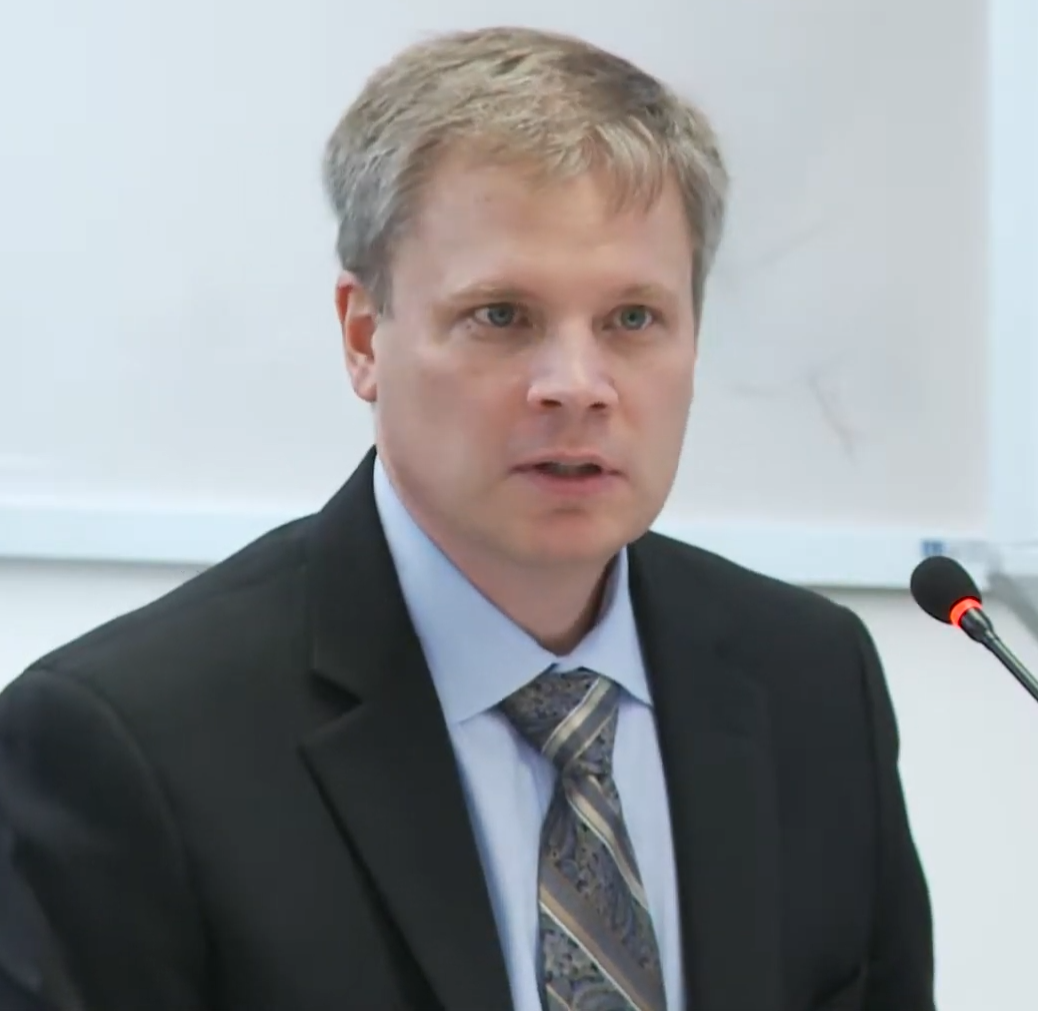

Commissioner of the Alaska Department of Education & Early Development
- In office 1 July 2016 – 30 June 2022
- Governor: Bill Walker; Mike Dunleavy
- Deputy: Karen Melin
- Preceded by: Michael Hanley
- Succeeded by: Deena Bishop

Superintendent of Copper River School District
- In office 2009–2016

Personal details
- Born: Georgia, United States
- Party: Republican
- Education: Columbia International University (MA, BA); University of Alaska Fairbanks (PhD)

Michael Johnson is an American educator who served as Commissioner of the Department of Education & Early Development of Alaska from 2016 to 2022. Prior to that he served in the Copper River School District as superintendent, school principal, district curriculum and staff development director, elementary teacher and special education program assistant. He announced his resignation on June 8, 2022, and officially left office June 30, 2022. Since then, Johnson served as the Dean of the College of Education and now as Senior Vice President at Columbia International University in Columbia, South Carolina. For a brief period from December 2, 2024, to March 31, 2025, he served as the Interim Headmaster of Ben Lippen School.

Johnson is a recipient of the Milken Educator Award.
