= Michael Johnson (serial killer) =

American serial killer and rapist

- Johnson in 2024
- Born: Michael A. Johnson Jr. September 5, 1985 (age 41); South Side, Chicago, Illinois, U.S.
- Convictions: First degree murder Aggravated criminal sexual assault (4 counts); Aggravated battery
- Penalty: 185 years imprisonment

Details
- Victims: 4+
- Span of crimes: August 2008 – May 2010
- Country: United States
- State: Illinois
- Date apprehended: May 30, 2010

Michael A. Johnson Jr. (born September 5, 1985) is an American serial killer who, between 2008 and 2010, killed four women in Chicago, Illinois, and discarded their bodies in abandoned buildings throughout the South Side. After a survivor came forward and reported him to police, Johnson was apprehended. He was sentenced to 90 years in prison, later reduced to 85 years, for beating, raping, and trying to kill a woman. In 2015, Johnson was convicted of raping and murdering a woman and sentenced to 100 years in prison.

== Early life ==
Johnson was born in South Side, Chicago, in 1985. He was born missing three fingers from his right hand, which is possibly due to his mother's heavy use of drugs during her pregnancy. When he was five years old, his father left the family, leaving Johnson and his six other siblings in the custody of his mother, who often neglected them. His mother also regularly beat Johnson with electrical cords and barred him along with his siblings from leaving the house. Due to this, she would not let any of them attend high school. The family struggled financially, so as a way of working, his mother resorted to prostitution, while Johnson would often travel to the corner store to beg for food.

Johnson met Tena Anderson at a friend's birthday in 2006. The two dived into a relationship, and a year later, Anderson delivered Johnson's baby. In April 2008, Johnson was granted work at FedEx, but due to him struggling financially, he became homeless and was subsequently laid off from work.

== Murders ==
A few months after being laid off, Johnson met a 43-year-old sex worker at a gas station, and he was able to convince her to agree to have sex for money. The two voyaged to a foreclosed home Johnson once lived in. The two had sex, but the woman refused to go on when Johnson requested a certain sex act. The refusal caused Johnson to be thrown into rage, and he attacked the woman, choking her until she lost consciousness, then sexually assaulted her and threw her off the second-story balcony. He then dragged her unconscious body to an alleyway where he left her for dead. The woman survived but suffered a collapsed lung, a lacerated liver, and permanent scars all over her back.

Two months later, in November 2008, Johnson attacked another woman, 38-year-old Eureka Jackson, whom he strangled and who died as a result. He discarded her body in a boarded-up building on the border in the West Pullman neighborhood. She was found with her shirt tied to her neck, which was also tied to a closet door handle. Johnson then took a year-long hiatus. In January 2010, Johnson struck again when he strangled Leslie Brown to death and dumped her dead body at 119th and Wentworth, where it was found frozen and nude by a passerby.

In March, Johnson attacked Candice Franklin in the neighborhood of Roseland. He choked her until she was unconscious, raped her, and left her for dead. She later awoke with a swollen eye and a bloodied face but survived from her injuries. Later that same month, Johnson strangled 30-year-old Siobhan "Shay" Hampton to death, later discarding her body near Harold's Chicken Shack. In May Johnson killed his final victim, 29-year-old Lutelda Hudson, who was also strangled.

== Arrest ==
Later in May, Franklin had recovered from her injuries and returned to prostitution as a way to make money. While out on the streets, she noticed Johnson and knew he was the one who attacked her. She quickly ran away, but Johnson followed. When Franklin made it to her boyfriend's home, Johnson retreated. Coincidently, a few weeks later, she noticed Johnson on the street again. This time she called her boyfriend, who arrived and confronted Johnson. Police quickly arrived and arrested Johnson; a swab of his DNA was taken, and it matched to DNA found at the crime scene, proving his guilt. Apparently, police had already been looking for Johnson after his DNA was matched to three of the four murders he committed, and DNA soon linked him to the fourth. He was charged with the four murders and the attempted murder of Franklin.

== Trial and imprisonment ==
Johnson was convicted of the attack on Franklin in March 2014 and sentenced to 90 years in prison. At sentencing, the prosecution sought the maximum, stating that DNA evidence had conclusively linked Johnson to four murders. On appeal, Johnson's 10-year sentence for aggravated battery was reduced to 5 years. The following year he was sentenced to 100 years imprisonment for the murder of Brown. Johnson has yet to be tried for the other three murders.

== See also ==
- List of serial killers in the United States
