= Titus Books (publisher) =

Independent New Zealand publisher

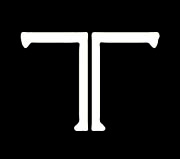

Titus Books is an independent New Zealand publisher. Founded in 2005, it was noted by reviewer Katherine Liddy in Landfall as an "exciting" addition to New Zealand literature.

Publishing a mixture of emerging and established novelists, poets and translators, authors have included Thomas Pors Koed, Olivia Macassey, Alan Brunton, Arno Loeffler, Scott Hamilton, Bronwyn Lloyd, Kendrick Smithyman, Jack Ross, Alex Wild, Mike Johnson , Edward Jenner, David Lyndon Brown, Olwyn Stewart, Stephen Oliver , Bill (William) Direen), Richard von Sturmer, Rogelio Guedea es:Rogelio Guedea , Richard Taylor and Jen Crawford. Titus Books has also published a collection of drawings by Ellen Portch, who has designed many of the Titus Books covers. Contributors to the literary journal Percutio have included some of the above and many others such as Jacques Coulardeau, Geoff Cush, Wystan Curnow, Peter Olds and Sally McIntyre, with cover art and photographs by Nigel Bunn, Sandra Bianciardi, Catherine James, Stuart Page and Ben Webb (artist).

== Publications ==
- Archetypes by Diana Halstead
- Postcard Stories by Richard von Sturmer
- Everything’s Something in Place by John Geraets
- Tales of the Waihorotiu by Carin Smeaton
- Moonshine Eggs by Russell Haley
- White City by David Lyndon Brown
- No Relation, stories by Thomas Pors Koed. May 2015. ISBN 978-1-8774414-9-3
- The Burnt Hotel, poetry by Olivia Macassey. Sept 2015. ISBN 978-1-877441-51-6
- Excerpts from a Natural History, poetry by Holly Painter. Sept 2015. ISBN 978-1-877441-50-9
- Carbon Shapes and Dark Matter, poetry by Stephanie Christie. Sept 2015. ISBN 978-1- 877441-52-3
- Beyond the Ohlala Mountains, Poems 1968–2002, by Alan Brunton, 2014. ISBN 978-1-877441-47-9
- Tourtagebuch, A performance tour diary translated into German by Arno Loeffler, 2013. ISBN 979-10-91280-00-6
- The Second Location, stories by Bronwyn Lloyd, 2011.
- Feeding the Gods, poems by Scott Hamilton with ten photographs by Kendrick Smithyman, 2011.
- Private Bestiary, Selected Unpublished Poems, Kendrick Smithyman, 2010.
- Kingdom of Alt, short stories by Jack Ross, 2010.
- The Constant Losers, novel by Alex Wild, 2010.
- Travesty, graphic SF novel, Mike Johnson, 2010.
- Wall, Art book, Ellen Portch (Artist), 2010.
- On the Eve of Never Departing, poetry, Richard von Sturmer, 2009.
- Free Fall, short passages of prose writing (called "microfictions"), Rogelio Guedea (translated from the Spanish by Peter Broad and Sandra Delgado Merill (USA)), 2009.
- Skin Hunger, poetry, David Lyndon Brown, 2009.
- Writers in Residence and Other Captive Fauna, poetry, Edward (Ted) Jenner, 2009.
- bad appendix, poetry, Jen Crawford, 2008.
- Enclosures, novel, William Direen, 2008. ISBN 978-1-877441-06-6
- EMO, novel, Jack Ross, 2008.
- Marked Men, novel, David Lyndon Brown, 2007.
- Luce Cannon, poetry, Will Christie, 2007.
- Conversation With a Stone, poetry, Richard Taylor , 2007.
- To the Moon in Seven Easy Steps', poetry & prose, Scott Hamilton, 2007.
- Song of the Brakeman, science fiction novel, Bill Direen, 2006. ISBN 0-9582586-7-8
- The Imaginary Museum of Atlantis, novel, Jack Ross, 2006.
- Vertical Harp: selected poems of Li He, free versions from the Chinese, Mike Johnson (writer)|Mike Johnson, 2006.
- Love in the Age of Mechanical Reproduction, poetry, Olivia Macassey, 2005.
- New Sea Land, long poem, Bill Direen, 2005. ISBN 0-9582586-4-3
- Either Side the Horizon poetry by Stephen Oliver, , 2005.
- Curriculum Vitae, short novel Olwyn Stewart, 2005.
- Trouble In Mind, short novel, Jack Ross, 2005.
- Coma, short novel and two short stories, Bill Direen, 2005.

== Affiliates ==
Percutio Magazine

- Percutio Literary Magazine (Annual). 2006 (pilot), 2007 (N° 1), 2008 (N° 2), 2009 (Performance, N° 3), 2010 (Necessity, N° 4), 2011 (Collaboration, N° 5), 2012 (Ah ! L'Europe, N° 6), 2013 (Outlying Hands, N° 7), 2014 (Expérience, N° 8), 2015 (No theme/Sujet libre, Nº 9). ISSN 1953-1427.
- History of Percutio annual

Brief (Journal)

- brief literary magazine
