= Bill Direen =

New Zealand writer and musician

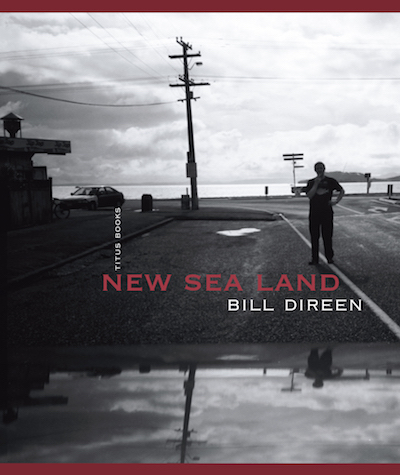
- Direen at Kawakawa Bay, New Zealand. "New Sea Land" (poems, 2005).

Background information
- Born: William Direen; 1957 (age 68–69); Christchurch, New Zealand
- Genres: Alternative rock; Post-punk; Neo-folk; Experimental literature
- Occupations: Musician; Poet
- Instruments: vocals; guitar
- Years active: 1975–present
- Labels: Grapefruit (music label); Carbon Records; Sophomore Lounge; Rattle; Unwucht; Zelle Records; SmartGuy; Flying Nun; Powertool Records; South Indies; Thokei Tapes; Corazoo; Siltbreeze; Titus Books; Editions de Titus (France); Nag's Head Press; Holloway Press; Sport New Zealand New Writing; Takahe Magazine; Broadsheet New New Zealand Poetry; South Indies

William Direen (born 1957) is a New Zealand-born musician-poet. As a writer Direen has published many books and read at events and book festivals at home and overseas. He is better known for his music and songs, recorded and performed with other musicians. He manages music group Bilders. Alone or with a group, he has made short tours of New Zealand, USA, Europe, Serbia and Australia. He is the subject of a documentary, Bill Direen, A Memory of Others, directed by Simon Ogston (2017). In 2025, Direen became an Arts Foundation/Te Tumu Toi laureate, for his lifetime contribution to writing and music.

== Books and Theatre ==
Direen directed the alternative Blue Ladder Theatre at 87 Cashel Street in 1984–85 Christchurch, and later produced a series of experimental "psycho-musicals" in Wellington. Later writing (1994–present) ranges from criticism and speculative fiction to science fiction and poetry sometimes performed with collaborating musicians.

From 2006 to 2017 he edited a trans-cultural literary annual Percutio, "dedicated to aspects of the creative process and to works that bridge cultures". He edited a special anthology in 2021 to oppose cost-cutting depletion of New Zealand National Library's non-NZ books. He still performs music live, solo and with Bilders. A new album is slated for 2027.

== Bibliography (for Discography see Bilders) ==
- Apropos (126 pages with 70 photographs, 2025, Grapefruit USA). Recollections, impressions and snapshots of musicians (1976–2025). https://www.grapefruitrecordclub.com/products/bilders-neverlasting-lp-w-book-add-on-option-pre-order
- 100 Years of Darkness (102pp, 2023, Grapefruit USA). A poetry collection about films.
- Lyrics of songs from albums are found in Grapefruit, Carbon or Zelle music album inserts.
- Stream Light: poems about place, broken by an imagined exhibition in an art gallery, where the audience moves through exhibits of sometimes threatening events. The small book is interlaced with colour works by ex-Christchurch artist Scott Flanagan. (South Indies).
- Mindful Expanded (Thokei Tapes, cassette reissue, 2023), spoken word and songs recorded in Berlin in 2010. (Distributed from Hamburg, or private distribution in NZ).
- Seasons (72pp, 2022, South Indies, NZ), a long poem, it spans a year in Otago, New Zealand. ISBN 978-1-99-116710-1.
- Overboard2, a history, 160 years of acquisitions of 'overseas' literature that led to the National Library of New Zealand's campaign to destroy its own collection. Despite opposition, this led to disposals on an unprecedented scale (the shredding of 500,000 books). 2021. 28pp.
- M.A.L.A (2021, Thokei Tapes) spoken and sung poems integrated in collaboration with musicians Steve Cournane and William Henry Meung. The full title of the release is Move Along, Love Among. The texts were published in a 26pp accompanying brochure. 2021.
- Ferocious, texts integrated in collaboration with musicians Mark Williams and Johannes Contag, published in booklet accompanying audio release. (20pp, RAT D-095 2020; UPC 822601400955).
- Road Runner, a poetic "record and testament to [...] a twelve date tour of Eastern USA". (40 pp, 2020).
- NS USAAUS RZ, a sampler of poetry and prose extracts from novels from 2006 to 2019, sold during tours of Serbia, USA, Australia and NZ (44pp, 2019).
- EN WOLFSKEHL ZU, a poetic tribute to the life of Karl Wolfskehl in New Zealand (1938–48) and to his partner in New Zealand, Dr. Margot Ruben (20pp, 2019).
- Enclosures 2–4, further titles in the Enclosures series containing essay, song lyrics, fiction, interview, diary (of an outpatient), experimental fiction, travel diary, creative essay ISBN 978-09951010-05, auto-biography, poetry, fiction, science fiction (zootopia) and utopian vision ISBN 979-10-91280-04-4. 2016–2018. Enclosures info
- Christchurch, Canal City, futuristic utopian vision of a Christchurch preserving historical suburban identities, with elevated trains, networks of canals and other approaches to organising a new society. Published in Percutio 2014, Nr. 8.
- The Book of Flanagan Christchurch pre-history, flora and fauna, arrival of humans and recent events including the Christchurch earthquakes. Edition of one. Exhibited at Christchurch Art Gallery as part of larger exhibition containing many further booklets filled by guests, conceived by artist Scott Flanagan, 2011.
- Versions Translations (Poetry, Kilmog Press, 2014). Responses to a range of European language poems, later enlarged and published with an introduction discussing each poem, in 'Percutio 2017'.
- The Ballad of Rue Belliard (Novel, The Writers Group, 2013). Author name, Guillaume Direen. An experimental romance set within a community on the outer perimeter of Paris. Entire issue of ISSN 1175-9313 No. 48.
- Wormwood (Novel, Titus Books, 2012). Re-edition of the 1997 experimental novel set in Berlin.
- Tourtagebuch (Diary, Titus Books, 2012). ISBN 979-10-91280-00-6. German translation by Arno Loeffler of Direen's 1994 personal diary of a European performance tour.
- Fallen to a Field. Poem in five parts recorded with Jonathan Crayford (piano) at NZ Embassy in Paris. 30 mins. Broadcast Radio New Zealand Concert, 10 July 2012. Percutio 2011.
- Dunedin Poems (Kilmog Press, 2011). ISBN 978-0-9864665-5-7
- Devonport, A Diary Diary impressions of Devonport, Auckland, during tenure of the University of Auckland Fellowship at the Michael King Writers Centre in 2010. (Signalman's House Series Nº.1, Holloway Press, University of Auckland, 2011) ISBN 978-0-9864618-0-4
- L. A novella, set in New Zealand in the midst of guerrilla warfare between two economic factions; the world has been reshaped after geological upheavals. Published in an anthology of NZ speculative fiction writers A Foreign Country. (Random Static. Anna Caro & Juliet Buchanan, editors). 2010. ISBN 978-0-473-16916-9
- Enclosures. First work in the Enclosures series, containing Jonah (at Kapiti), The Stadium (history of a people confined to a biosphere), a folk tale and autobiographical content. 2010 & 2008 (1st edition) ISBN 978-1-877441-06-6 Enclosures (1) info
- Song of the Brakeman (Novel, 2006). Apocalyptic vision of a future South Pacific. Science fiction novel. (Titus Books) ISBN 0-9582586-7-8
- New Sea Land, long poem with a triple focus, upon the new (childhood), land and ocean, which accumulates refrains of acclamatory word-groupings relating to New Zealand culture or history. ISBN 978-0-958258-64-7
- Coma (three novellas, 2005). 'Digging Ground', a tale of separation and momentary reunion, 'Sunshower', a monologue of an abusive encounter on a country road, and 'Coma', a life-thread recounted by a young woman in a drug-related blackout.
- Jules (Novel, 2003). 24 hours in the life of a Parisian art teacher, who is hallucinating characters from the paintings he researches. (Alpha Books) ISBN 9780958326643
- Onaevia (Fable, 2002). Short history and mythology of an imaginary land. (Alpha Books) ISBN 0-9583266-0-6
- Nusquama (also published as Utopia Rag), 2002. Several stories told in different voices, describing the family histories of a musician (Mike) and of his spouse (Fay) up until the first person monologue of their daughter, victim of a rape. The stories are interlaced with that of the apparently accidental death of Fay's father when she was a child. Nusquama was translated into German by Arno Loeffler in 2005 (Titus Books ISBN 9780958253451).
- Wormwood (short novel), 1997. Tale of a refugee from the Balkan wars of the 1990s, his affair with a Berlin woman (originally from West Germany), and his involvement with a criminal group originally from West Berlin, which wishes to control profitable areas in former East Berlin. Published in its entirety in SPORT 18 1997; reissued in chapbook form to be sold at performances; thereafter translated into Serbian (Pelen) by Milan Pupezin for Partizanska knjiga in 2019.
- Crappings Poems. 1993. 5 to 12.
- Inklings Poems. 1988. (Printed letter press). R. S. Gormack (Printer), Nick Gormack (Printer), Nag's Head Press (Christchurch, N.Z.).
- Evolition Poems. Publisher: 1995 (Printed letter press). R. S. Gormack (Printer), Nick Gormack (Printer), Nag's Head Press (Christchurch, N.Z.), F. Cartwright & Son (Binder), Print Book, English, 1995
- 20-9-1 Twenty song lyrics, nine short stories and a theatre piece (The Shell). Prototype. Christchurch. 1980.
- Editor Percutio, ISSN 1953-1427, a trans-cultural literary annual (poetry, fiction extracts, translations & versions, essays, reviews and history). 2006, −07, −08, −09, −10, −11, −12, −13, −14, −15. 16, 17. Guest Editor of Landfall No. 219 'On Music' (ISSN 0023-7930). ISBN of Landfall #219 as separate book ISBN 978-1-877372 98-8; brief No. 36 and No. 42 (ISSN 1175-9313).

== Awards and fellowships ==
- Royal Society Award for Secondary School Science, 1972 (now The Prime Minister's Future Scientist Prize)
- John Tinline Prize for English, 1980, Canterbury University, Christchurch, NZ.
- M.A. Hons (1st Class), 1982, Canterbury University, Christchurch, NZ.
- University of Auckland Writers Resident at the Michael King Writers Centre, 2010.
- The novella ‘L’, set in the South Pacific after geological and political upheavals (from the collection A Foreign Country, edited by Anna Caro and Juliet Buchanan, Random Static, 2010), was nominated for the 2011 Sir Julius Vogel SF Awards. The anthology itself won Best Collected Work award.
- Arts Foundation Te Tumu Toi laureate award
