= Edward Jenner (writer) =

New Zealand-born poet (1946–2021)

Edward (Ted) Jenner was born in 1946 in Dunedin and died 8 July 2021 in Auckland. He was a New Zealand born poet, translator, teacher and researcher of Ancient Greek texts. He lived in New Zealand and overseas teaching Classics and producing poems, translations, and scholarly articles. His poetry and research have been reviewed and remarked upon.

After publishing two short volumes of poetry in 1980 and 1991, Jenner published "Writers in Residence and Other Captive Fauna" in 2009. Based on this work, the writer Jack Ross discussed Jenner's 'postmodern classicism' and his attention to landscapes, 'above all those of Africa' along with his 'devotion to the particularities of memory'.

Poet and critic Michael Harlow referred to subjects such as 'certitude, the insistently rational and dogmatic ... and the posturing of much prevailing literary narcissism' as being 'challenged and unmasked' in "Writers in Residence".

"Complete Gold Leaves", being his translations and the original Greek texts of Ancient Greek lamellae with messages on the afterlife for adherents of some unknown cult, appeared in 2016 in the magazine Percutio 2016 (number 10, 2016) accompanied by an article on the relevance of the journeys of the dead from Malakula and the small islands (Vanuatu) to 'Aeneid' VI and Greco-Roman mythology. Gold Leaves (Atuanui Press, 2014), outlined his tentative conclusions about the state of research into those "lamellae", and contained all of his translations (without originals) of these texts.

His last book "The Arrow that Missed" (Cold Hub Press 2017) was reviewed in different publications by Johanna Emeney and by critic-poet Jack Ross. The former called attention to his evocations of landscape and the latter to his 'examination of "cracks in the edifice", the things we can never know, can never reconcile with one another'. But perhaps the most comprehensive review of this volume is that by Richard von Sturmer, who examined the prose poem in general and the possibilities 'offered by fragmentation'.

== Works ==
- A Memorial Brass (Hawk Press, 1980).
- Dedications (Omphalos Press, 1991). ISBN 0473011867
- The Love Songs of Ibykos: 22 Fragments (The Holloway Press, 1997).
- Sappho Triptych, Puriri Press, 2007
- Writers in Residence and Other Captive Fauna (Titus Books, Auckland, 2009). ISBN 978-1-877441-09-7. 130 pp.
- Gold Leaves, an account of the so-called 'Orphic' Gold tablets, with translations from the Ancient Greek. Atuanui Press. 2014. ISBN 978-0-9922453-7-5
- Percutio 2016. No.10 Special issue devoted to two projects by Classicist and poet Edward Jenner. ISBN 978-1-877441-53-0
- 'The arrow that missed' (Cold Hub Press, Lyttelton, 2017) ISBN 978-0-473-39818-7. 52 pp.
