= Jack Ross (writer) =

New Zealand poet and novelist

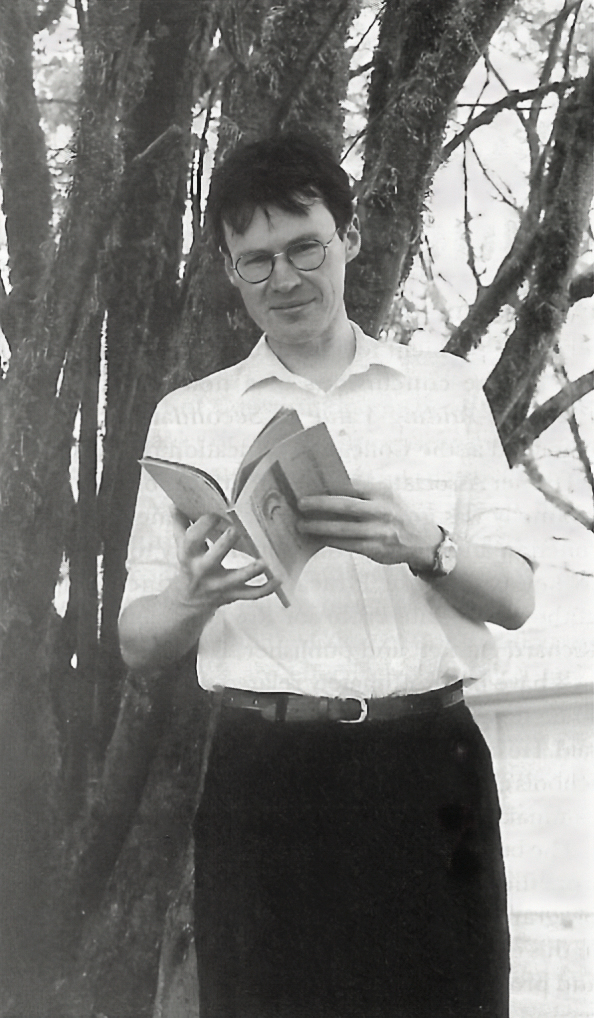
Ross in 1998, holding a copy of his poetry collection, City of Strange Brunettes, published that year

Jack Ross (born 6 November 1962) is a New Zealand poet, novelist, translator, editor and lecturer in creative writing. A trilogy of novels has been published by two different publishers, Alan Brunton's Bumper Books (Volume 1) and Titus Books.

== Biography ==
Born on Auckland's North Shore, Ross was raised and educated in the East Coast Bays. After completing degrees in English and Italian at the University of Auckland, Ross was given a Commonwealth Scholarship to study in the UK in and was awarded a PhD in English and Comparative Literature by the University of Edinburgh. He is a Lecturer specialising in Academic and Creative Writing at Massey University's Albany campus.

From 2002 to 2005 Ross was editor of the literary magazine brief. He has also edited other literary magazines The Pander (co-editor 1998–99), Spin (co-editor 1999–2003), Landfall (guest editor: issue 214, 2007), and Poetry NZ (guest editor: issue 38, 2008).

== Criticism ==
Ross is little known outside New Zealand avant-garde literary circles. He was described by Richard Reeve in Landfall as "a leading contributor to the field of experimental writing in New Zealand", Mark Houlahan remarked in New Zealand Books [15 (2) (June 2005): 14–15], that "Nobody else in New Zealand writes quite like Ross, though some of Bill Manhire's fictions in The New Land are precedents." Other reviewers have been less positive: Laurence Jenkins wrote that "Not all the contents are evil, but the spirit of darkness certainly prevails," about Nights with Giordano Bruno [in JAAM 16 (2001): 185]. According to Joe Wylie "Outside of literati farm, this sort of thing has a very limited life expectancy ... Can Ross move beyond this? Does he choose not to?" [Takahe 54 (2005) 63].

== Works ==
- City of Strange Brunettes. ISBN 0-473-05446-9 (Auckland: Pohutukawa Press, 1998) [poems]
- (with Gabriel White) A Town like Parataxis. ISBN 0-473-07104-5 (Auckland: Perdrix Press, 2000) [poems / photos]
- Nights with Giordano Bruno. ISBN 0-9582225-0-9 (Wellington: Bumper Books, 2000) [novel (R.E.M. Trilogy, 1)]
- (with Gabriel White) The Perfect Storm. ISBN 0-473-07350-1 (Auckland: Perdrix Press, 2000) [poems / video]
- The Writing Skills Workshop. prod. Robert van der Vyver (Otago University: Higher Education Development Centre, 2001) [workbook / video]
- Chantal's Book. ISBN 0-473-08744-8 (Wellington: HeadworX, 2002) [poems]
- Monkey Miss Her Now. ISBN 0-476-00182-X (Auckland: Danger Publishing, 2004) [short stories]
- Trouble in Mind. ISBN 0-9582586-1-9 (Auckland: Titus Books, 2005) [novella]
- A Bus Called Mr Nice Guy. ISBN 0-473-10526-8 (Auckland: Perdrix Press, 2005) [poems / travelogue]
- The Imaginary Museum of Atlantis. ISBN 0-9582586-8-6 (Auckland: Titus Books, 2006) [novel (R.E.M. Trilogy, 2)]
- To Terezín. Social and Cultural Studies, 8. ISSN 1175-7132 (Auckland: Massey University, 2007) [poems / travelogue]
- Papyri: Love Poems & Fragments from Sappho. ISBN 978-0-473-12397-0 (Auckland: Soapbox Press, 2007)
- EMO. ISBN 978-1-877441-07-3 (Auckland: Titus Books, 2008) [novel (R.E.M. Trilogy, 3)]
- The Return of the Vanishing New Zealander. ISBN 978-0-9864507-6-1. (Dunedin: Kilmog Press, 2009) [poems]
- Kingdom of Alt. ISBN 978-1-877441-15-8. (Auckland: Titus Books, 2010) [short stories / novella]

Jack Ross has also edited and co-edited a number of publications.
