= Grapefruit (record label) =

Graefruit Records
- Founded: 2011
- Founder: Simon Joyner, Ben Goldberg
- Genre: Rock
- Country of origin: United States
- Location: Brooklyn, New York
- Official website: www.grapefruitrecordclub.com

Grapefruit is an independent record label and distributor. It began in 2011 as a subscription record club, launching the first series with an album by American band Lambchop, which was a collection of juvenilia by Kurt Wagner, titled Turd Goes Back: Essential Tracks from Secret Sourpuss & Hot Tussy.

== History ==
The label switched from being a subscription-only record club to releasing albums individually. Grapefruit distributes other independent labels as well as its own artists.

== Artists ==
Kurt Wagner, Dead C, Jackson C. Frank, Simon Joyner, Marisa Anderson, Bill Direen, Dump.

== See also ==
- List of record labels
