= John Carroll University =

Private university in University Heights, Ohio, US

Coordinates: 41.491°N 81.530°W

- Former name: St. Ignatius College (1886–1923)
- Motto: Ad Majorem Dei Gloriam (Latin)
- Motto in English: For the greater glory of God
- Type: Private university
- Established: 1886; 140 years ago
- Religious affiliation: Catholic (Jesuit)
- Academic affiliations: AJCU; ACCU; CIC
- Endowment: $302.15 million (2025)
- President: Carolyn Noll Sorg
- Faculty: 146 full-time, 173 part-time (fall 2024)
- Students: 2,864 (fall 2024)
- Undergraduates: 2,339 (fall 2024)
- Postgraduates: 525 (fall 2024)
- Location: University Heights, Ohio, U.S.
- Campus: Suburban, 63 acres (25.5 ha)
- Colors: Blue & gold
- Nickname: Blue Streaks
- Sporting affiliations: NCAA Division III – NCAC
- Mascot: Lobo
- Website: jcu.edu
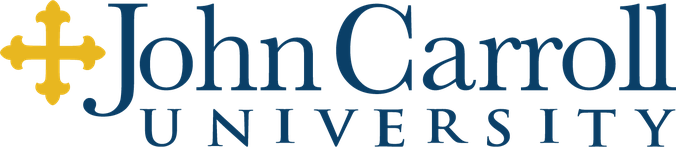

John Carroll University (JCU) is a private Jesuit university in University Heights, Ohio, United States, a suburb of Cleveland. It was founded in 1886 as St. Ignatius College and renamed in 1923 for John Carroll, the first Catholic bishop in the United States. For the 2025–2026 academic year, the university enrolled 2,906 undergraduate and graduate students.

The university is primarily an undergraduate, liberal arts institution composed of three colleges: the College of Arts and Sciences, the Boler College of Business, and the College of Health. As a Jesuit institution, the university follows an educational approach shaped by Jesuit traditions.

== History ==
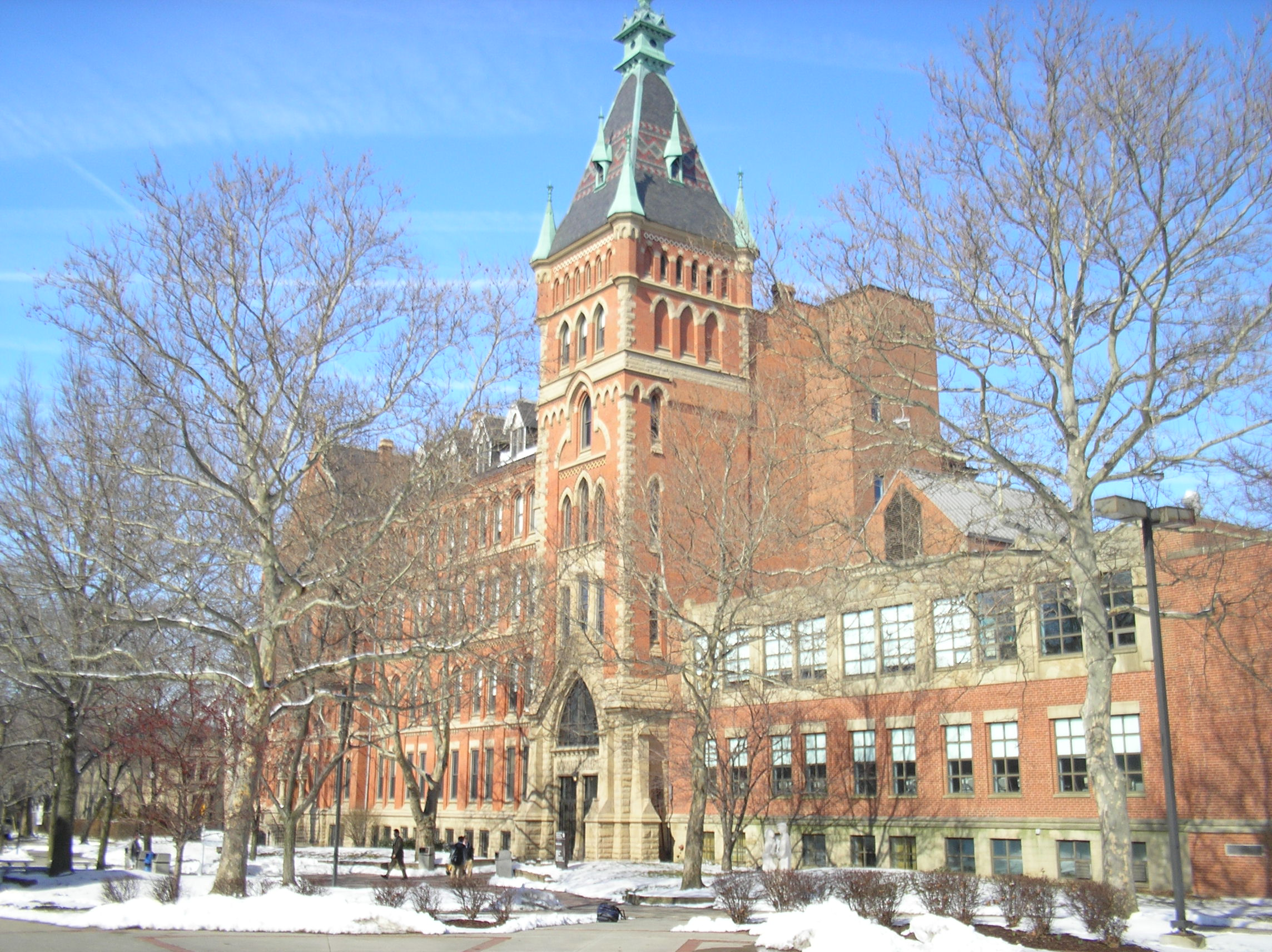
The main building of St. Ignatius College, now part of the Saint Ignatius High School campus

John Carroll University was founded in 1886 by the Society of Jesus under the title of St. Ignatius College, after Ignatius of Loyola, as a college for men. It has been in continuous operation as a degree-granting institution since then. Founded as the 19th of 27 Jesuit colleges and universities in the United States, it is a member of the Association of Jesuit Colleges and Universities.

In 1923, the college was renamed in honor of John Carroll, the first archbishop of the Catholic Church in the United States and the founder of Georgetown University. The university relocated in 1935 from its original site on Cleveland's West Side to its current campus in University Heights, Ohio. However, the high school section retained its name as Saint Ignatius High School and continues to operate at the original site.

During World War II, the university participated in the V-12 Navy College Training Program, which prepared students for service as commissioned officers in the United States Navy.

John Carroll University became coeducational in 1968 with the admission of women to the College of Arts and Sciences. In the decades that followed, the campus underwent significant expansion, including construction of the Dolan Center for Science and Technology, development of the Athletic, Wellness, and Event Center, renovation of residence halls, and recent additions such as the Gateway North development.

=== Jesuit tradition ===
John Carroll University is affiliated with the Society of Jesus, a Catholic religious order. Its educational approach is informed by Jesuit values, including service and justice, community and accompaniment, magis (striving for more), and reflection and discernment. The Jesuit concept of cura personalis, or care for the whole person, is reflected in the university's mission and programming. Related initiatives include community-based research, service-immersion programs, and internships with local organizations.

== Campus ==
The John Carroll University campus occupies 65 acres in University Heights, Ohio, approximately 10 miles east of downtown Cleveland. Campus buildings reflect a Collegiate Gothic architectural style, with Saint Ignatius Hall and Grasselli Tower among the university's central and historic structures.

Academic facilities include the Dolan Center for Science and Technology, the Boler College of Business, and buildings supporting programs in the College of Health. These facilities house classrooms, laboratories, and multipurpose instructional spaces.

All undergraduate students live in University-sponsored housing for four years, with the exception of commuting students. On-campus housing includes traditional residence halls and suite-style accommodations. Campus grounds include green spaces such as the Hamlin Quad, along with pedestrian walkways and outdoor gathering areas. Additional facilities include dining locations, fitness and recreation spaces, and areas used by student organizations, campus ministry, and leadership programs.

== Academics ==
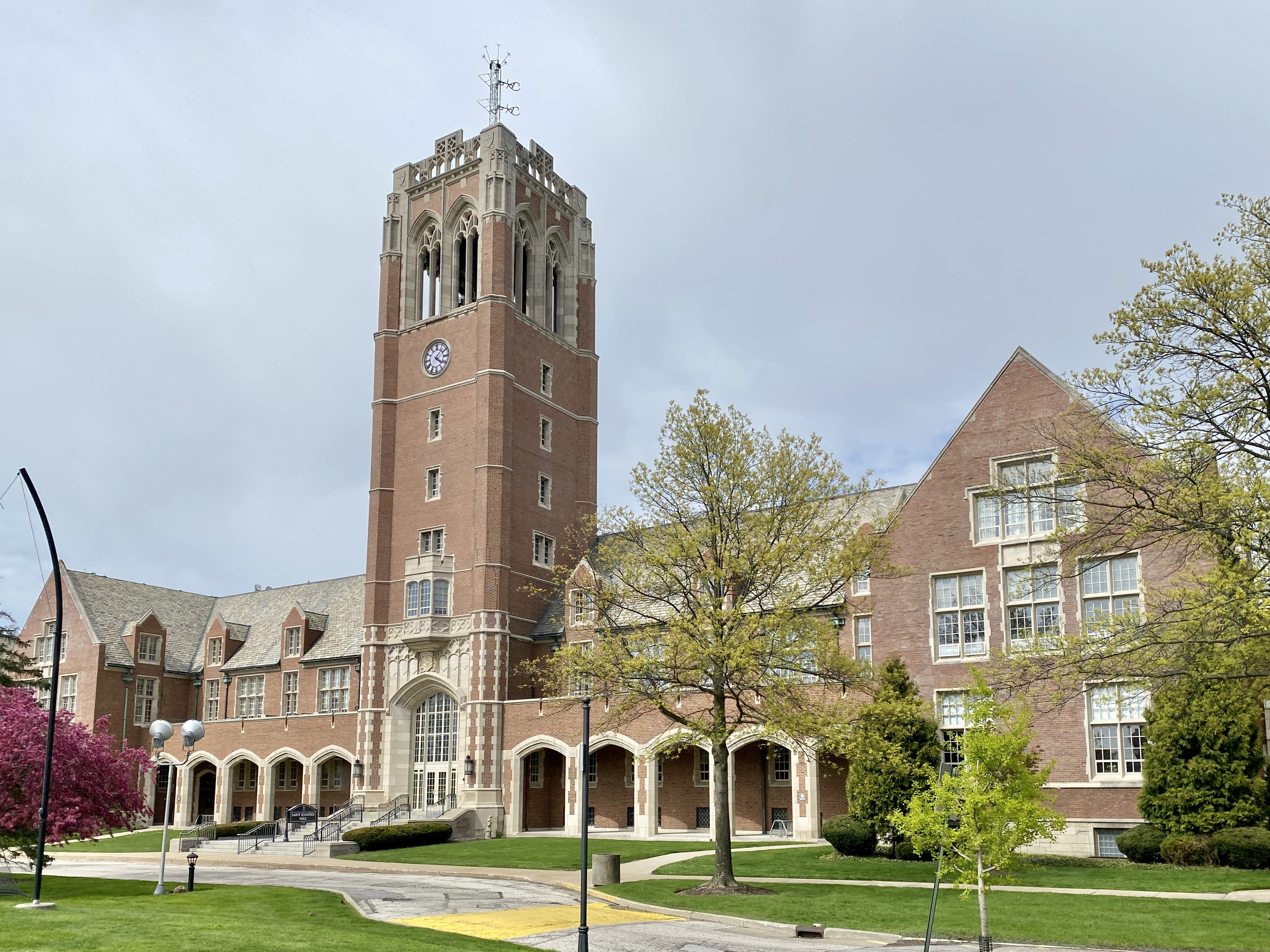
Saint Ignatius Hall

John Carroll University offers undergraduate and graduate programs across the arts and sciences, business, and health fields. Academic programs are organized into three colleges: the College of Arts and Sciences, the Boler College of Business, and the College of Health.

The university's curriculum is based on a Jesuit educational framework and includes required coursework in humanities, natural sciences, and social sciences. General education requirements cover areas such as communication, ethics, and social issues.

John Carroll University offers several honors and scholars programs, as well as pre-professional tracks and selected dual-degree or accelerated programs in fields including medicine, law, business, and health professions.

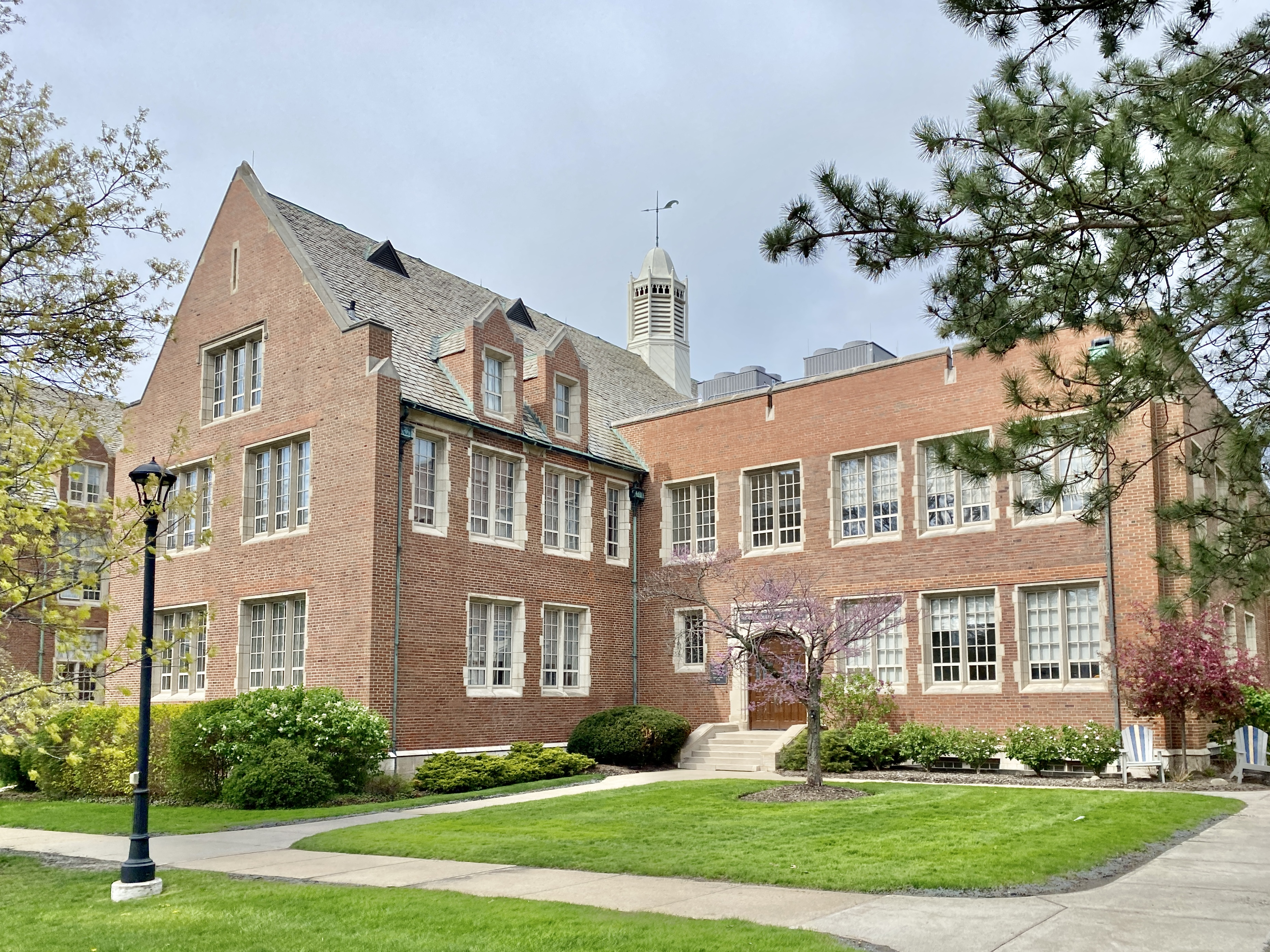
Boler College of Business

=== Undergraduate programs & admissions ===
John Carroll University offers more than 70 undergraduate majors and minors through its three academic colleges. The College of Arts and Sciences includes programs in humanities, natural sciences, social sciences, and education. The Boler College of Business offers programs in finance, marketing, management, economics, and entrepreneurship. The College of Health focuses on programs such as exercise science, public health, and healthcare leadership. Students may combine majors and minors across colleges for interdisciplinary study.

In 2025, John Carroll University accepted 81.1% of undergraduate applicants, with admission standards considered difficult, applicant competition considered very low, and with those enrolled having an average 3.66 high school GPA. The college does not require submission of standardized test scores. If submitted, scores are considered. Those enrolled that submitted test scores had an average 1240 SAT score (18% submitting) or an average 27 ACT score (24% submitting).

=== Rankings ===
Academic rankings

Master's
- Washington Monthly: 66

Regional
- U.S. News & World Report: 3

National
- Forbes: 343

In 2025, John Carroll University was included among the Princeton Review's Best 390 Colleges in America and was listed by Princeton Review as one of the 209 Best Value Colleges in the country.

In the Wall Street Journal's 'The 2025 Best Colleges in the U.S.,' John Carroll University was ranked 206th out of 500 top institutions of higher learning nationwide, placing it in the top 7% of all colleges and universities in the United States.

In the 2025 U.S. News & World Report college rankings, John Carroll University was ranked third out of 165 regional universities in the Midwest. The university has been ranked within the top ten of this category since 1988. The university was also ranked third (tied) for undergraduate teaching, third for "most innovative" schools, and 23rd as a "best value" school.

== Student life ==
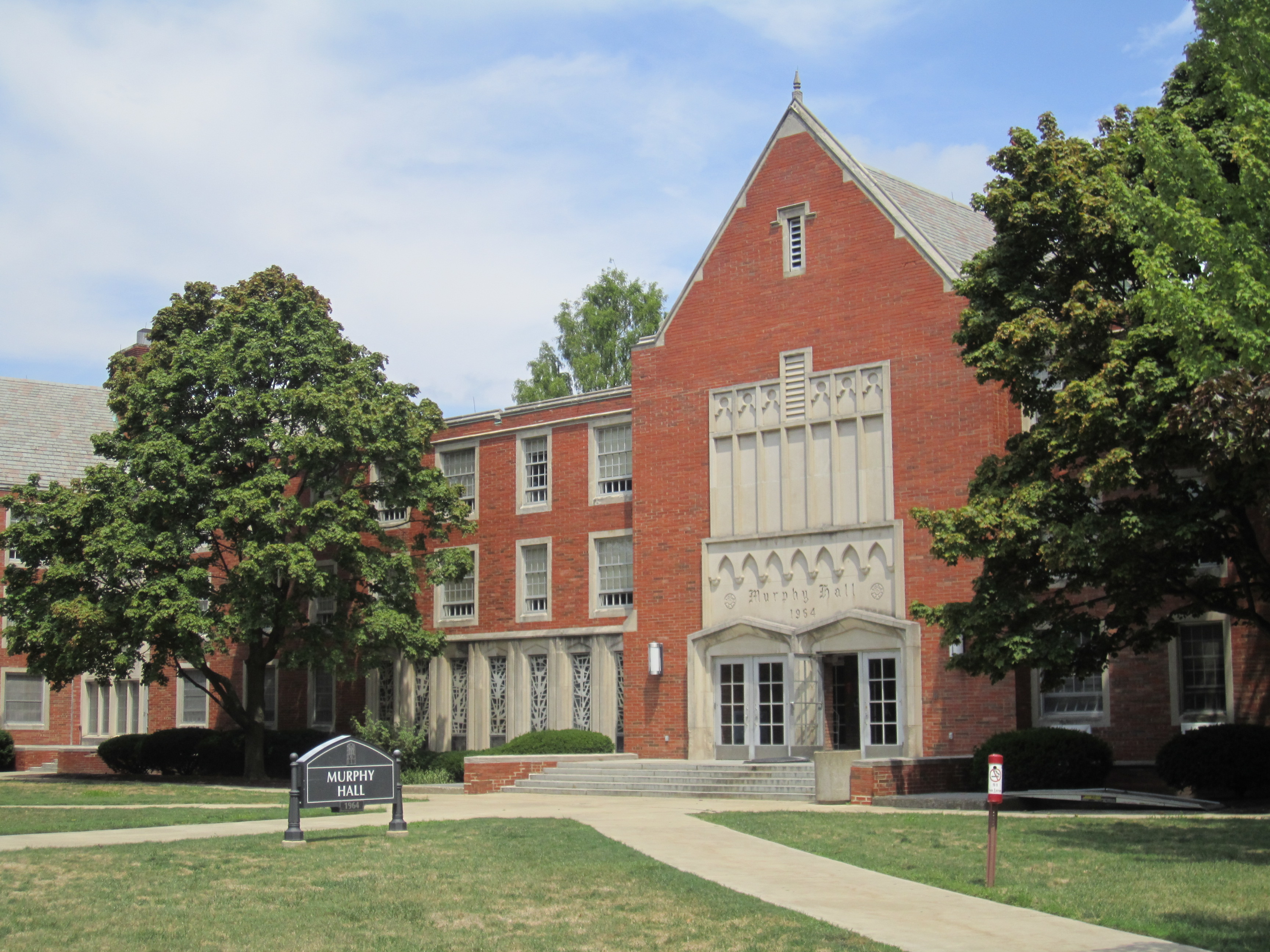
Murphy Hall is the university's largest residence hall.

The university has over 100 student-led organizations representing academic, cultural, spiritual, and recreational interests. Some organizations include service-related activities at local and international levels. Student groups include academic societies, performance ensembles, political organizations, advocacy groups, and cultural clubs.

Greek life at John Carroll is organized under the Interfraternity Council and the Panhellenic Council. Recognized fraternities and sororities participate in leadership development and community service.

== Athletics ==
John Carroll athletics logo

John Carroll offers 24 men's and women's varsity sports teams. The university's official colors are blue and gold and teams compete under the nickname Blue Streaks. In 2025, John Carroll joined the North Coast Athletic Conference (NCAA) Division III. The university was previously a member institution of the Ohio Athletic Conference since 1989.

Major athletic events are held at Don Shula Stadium, named for NFL coach and alumnus Don Shula. Both Shula and former NFL player and alumnus London Fletcher contributed to the stadium's construction. Additional facilities support indoor sports, fitness programs, and recreational activities.

The university's wrestling team won the NCAA Division III national championship in 1974–75. Other teams reaching national semifinals include football (2002, 2016) and men's basketball (2003–04). On November 12, 2016, the football team ended Mount Union's 112-game regular-season winning streak. John Carroll athletes have also achieved 22 individual national championships across wrestling, track and field, swimming, and diving.

Students have access to intramural sports, fitness classes, and recreational programs, which accommodate both competitive and casual participation.

== Student newspaper ==
The Carroll News is the student-run newspaper of John Carroll University, founded in 1925. It initially covered both the university and St. Ignatius High School, but after 1927 it focused exclusively on the university.

The publication includes sections on campus news, arts and life, sports, business, and opinion. It is operated by students and publishes issues on a weekly basis.

== See also ==
- List of Jesuit sites
- WJCU
