= South Indies =

South Indies is a rights and publishing label established in Christchurch, New Zealand, in 1984 as a vinyl records label and small book publisher. It released vinyl, books, cassettes and video-cassettes before moving into the leasing of material to distributing labels, and the protection of existing copyright. It subsumes various "one-off" projects and imprints such as Alpha Books (NZ), Tank Publishing, 5 to 12 publishing and some early Titus Books titles. It has entered into collaborative or licensed releases with enterprises Powertool Records (NZ), Sophomore Lounge (USA), Grapefruit (USA), Partizanska (Serbia) and Zelle (Austria). It has facilitated use of existing artwork for publications such as In Love With These Times (Flying Nun Records) and, more recently, a 92-page colour illustrated artbook dedicated to the artists of the early Flying Nun period, Hellzapoppin (Christchurch Art Gallery Te Puna o Waiwhētu, 2021).

== Releases ==
South Indies released local (New Zealand) groups on 12" vinyl, cassettes or compilations *Bread and Board. Artists included Sparky's Magic Baton (Barry Stockley (bass) & Jessica Walker (voice & 12-string)), The Trephines (Wall of Waiararapa, 12" cover & cassette), Neil Jones (Dobro guitar & voice)), Paul Sutherland (compilation), Free Radicals (Jonathan Besser and Ross Harris 12" EP) The Haemogoblins Psychodelicatessen (LP), Bill Direen & Barry Stockley (12" EP), Soluble Fish (LP & 12" & 7"), Material by early Bilders, Urbs & Vacuum (Siltbreeze) was issued or reissued ... and a 12" EP of theatre songs by the Soluble Fish troupe & Blue Ladder Theatre.

1984: South Indies managed release of Bilders album Split Seconds (1984) followed by a reissue of Beati/en Hearts (Bilders album (repurchased from Flying Nun, 1985)), CoNCH3 and others. Rights and sub-leasing (sometimes in collaboration) include projects such as Above Ground (cassette) (Stuart Page, M.R.Crook, C. Woodward, B. Direen) for Siltbreeze (Philadelphia), Alien/Skulls for Hecuba (San Francisco), Twenty Minutes for Hayfever (Bremen), No Name (Germany), Human Kindness LP & CD for Corazoo (Switzerland), Vacuum (Siltbreeze) and early Bilders material (a matching set of four 12 inch EPs) compiled by Unwucht (Augsburg). South Indies was discussed in Stranded in Paradise (The History of NZ Rock and Roll), magazines such as Germany's Spex (magazine) ('Und waehrend ich noch ueberlege...'), as well as small distribution magazines . 'Later in the year Direen shifted to the capital, released yet another album ... and began fostering a bunch of artists for his South Indies label.'

== Releases ==
- 1993-2003 : Flying Nun (Mushroom/Festival/Warner Bros) leases and releases Bilders material from the eighties in four retrospective CDs.
- 2004-2007 : Flying Nun DVD II Second Season, features 'The Alligator Song' video clip (Festival).
- 2007 : Flying Nun retrospective box set features 'Alien' (Warner Bros).
- 2006 - 2009 : NZ's Powertool Records leases and releases recent recorded material on CD only. Chrysanthemum Storm (L.P.), October 2008, was supported by a national tour organised by Powertool Records.
- 2010–present : leasing of existing material and protection of new works on vinyl —— Flavour of the Meat (Grapefruit Record Club), The Utopians are Just Out Boozin' (SmartGuy Records), Bilders, Bilderine, Die Bilder and Six Impossible Things rereleases with Unwucht, new Bilders recording 'Wonders' with Onec Records Plymouth UK, Vacuum songs written or co-written by Bill Direen on two 7 inch EPS with Siltbreeze, material released by Onset Offset Christchurch NZ —— and the amicable completion and termination of digital release rights with Powertool NZ [CDs only 2006-2010], EMI, Warner Bros and Flying Nun (1990–94).
- 2012 : Flying Nun release TIME TO GO: THE SOUTHERN PSYCHEDELIC MOMENT 1981 - 86 with Russian Rug at Track 5.
- 2013-16 : South Indies oversees the interpretation of music with several small labels such as Unwucht (Germany), Grapefruit (USA), Siltbreeze (USA), SmartGuy (USA), Zelle (Austria) as well as giving permission for use of music to video and film producers.
- 2017 : South Indies gives permission to Simon Ogston to use original recorded material in his film about Bill Direen; assures the release of an online album Bilders Tour Europe with Zelle Records (Germany/Austria); and participates in the physical release of Chrysanthemum Storm songs [vinyl] and the vinyl reissue of the album "Cut" in partnership with Zelle Records and Powertool Records.
- 2019 : South Indies gives permission to the American label Sophomore Lounge to release 26 original recordings on the Original Soundtrack double album, "Bill Direen, A Memory of Others".

== See also ==
- List of record labels
- Music of New Zealand
