= Biondi =

Biondi is an Italian surname. Notable people with the surname include:

- Guido Biondi (1952–1999) Italian football player
- Alfredo Biondi (1928–2020), Italian politician and lawyer
- Dick Biondi (1932–2023), Radio Hall of Fame Top 40 and Oldies disc jockey
- Ernesto Biondi (1855–1917), Italian sculptor who won the grand prix at the 1900 Exposition Universelle in Paris
- Fabio Biondi (born 1961), Italian violinist and conductor
- Fabrizio Biondi (born 1954), Italian rower
- Ferdinand Biondi, CM, CQ (1909–1998), French Canadian radio broadcaster
- Frank Biondi (1945–2019), American businessman
- Ivan Franjo Biondić (1572–1644), Croatian-Italian writer, diplomat and historian
- Jean Biondi (1900–1950), French politician
- Josefa Biondi (1916–2019), Argentine politician
- Laurent Biondi (born 1959), French former cyclist
- Lawrence Biondi, S.J., president emeritus of Saint Louis University
- Lidia Biondi (1941–2016), Italian film and television actress
- Marcella Biondi (born 1970), Italian alpine skier and freestyle skier
- Martha Biondi, American scholar
- Maria Domenica Fumasoni Biondi (1766–1828), Italian archeologist
- Mario Biondi (born 1971), Italian singer
- Mario Biondi (writer) (born 1939), Italian writer, poet, literary critic, journalist and translator
- Matt Biondi (born 1965), three-time U.S. Olympic swimmer, winning 11 medals
- Nicola Biondi (1866–1929), Italian painter
- Paul Biondi, American composer for television and guitar teacher
- Pepe Biondi (1909–1975), Argentine comedian
- Peter J. Biondi (1942–2011), American Republican Party politician, in the New Jersey General Assembly since 1998
- Pierluigi Biondi (born 1974), Italian politician
- Pietro Fumasoni Biondi (1872–1960), Italian Cardinal of the Roman Catholic Church
- Pietro Biondi (born 1939), Italian actor and voice actor
- Salvador Biondi (1926–2016), Argentine football player and manager
- Valentina Costa Biondi (born 1995), Argentine field hockey player

== See also ==
- Stadio Guido Biondi, multi-use stadium in Lanciano, Italy
- Biondini
