= Leopoldo Fregoli =

Italian actor

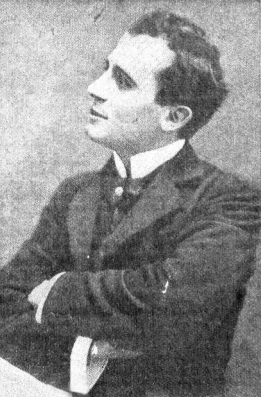
Leopoldo Fregoli, as he appeared in the Argentinian magazine Caras y Caretas in 1935.

Leopoldo Fregoli (Italian pronunciation: [leoˈpɔldo ˈfreːɡoli]; 2 July 1867 – 26 November 1936) was an Italian actor and quick-change artist.

== Early professional years ==
Originally an amateur entertainer, he took his first steps to professionalism while serving in the Italian army in Abyssinia under General Baldissera in 1890. A troupe of theatrical performers the general hired to entertain his soldiers did not materialise. Fregoli offered to fill in and was an immediate success. General Baldissera subsequently had Fregoli posted, not as a soldier but as a performer, to the theatre at Massowah, which he used to entertain soldiers. Fregoli became the director and stage manager of the theatre and casino. After a year he returned to Italy and performed in Rome, Genoa and Florence. In the audience at Florence was a government registry clerk, Ugo Biondi, who was so impressed with Fregoli's performance that he sought him out and asked for some lessons in how to follow in his footsteps. Fregoli generously complied and Biondi went on to be another great quick change artist – first claiming to be a pupil, but later set up as the 'original' Fregoli.

== London ==
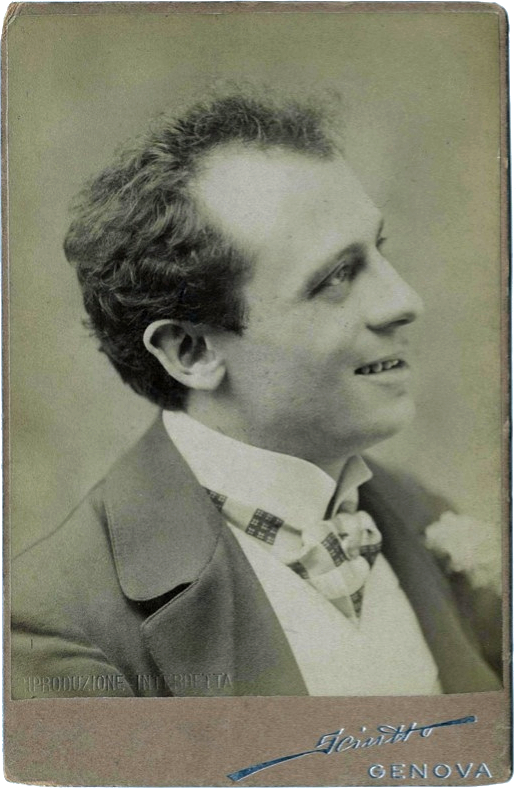
Fregoli circa 1900

From Italy Fregoli went to Brazil, Spain, and the United States. While he was in Madrid he was watched in performance by Alfred Moul, the general manager of the Alhambra Theatre in London's Charing Cross Road (which was being refitted at that time in the Moorish style under the direction of the great designer Owen Jones). Moul had heard of Fregoli's genius and wanted to be the first impresario in Britain to sign him up. He subsequently claimed that Fregoli (and his team of supporting assistants) were being paid £350 per week to perform at the Alhambra – a remarkable amount for the time. But this was nothing compared to what Fregoli was to generate in ticket sales.

The Alhambra was scheduled to reopen early in March 1897 with the premiere of Sir Arthur Sullivan's new ballet "Victoria and Merrie England". There were a few problems with this work (it was rather over-long in its original form) and so it was thought that for a week or two, Leopoldo Fregoli could perform (he needed little in the way of permanent sets, etc.) until Sir Arthur was satisfied his work was just right. Such was Fregoli's success that it was to be late in May of that year before the Sullivan piece was finally performed.

Fregoli took London by storm. He did quick-fire performances, impersonating Wagner, Rossini, Verdi and Paderewski one after another. He would exit stage left as a street musician and appear almost immediately stage right as a woman. Everybody - including the great actors and performers of the day, such as Dan Leno - wanted to see him, and his run was extended and extended, as was the seating in the theatre; not bad for someone who didn't even speak English. The general view of him was that, apart from his obvious abilities as a quick change artist he was - unlike his rivals - a consummate actor and a brilliant writer. He gave private performances for royalty and aristocrats (such as the Rothschilds, for whom he calmly explained all of his tricks). He inspired a host of imitators, male and female. Every theatre in London soon had its protean artist; even Biondi was there, performing at the same time. There were spoofers and parodists: journalists claimed tipsy theatregoers were demanding their money back upon discovering that all the performers they had just witnessed were actually just one man.

== International tours and final years ==
While there is no doubt Fregoli enjoyed himself and his success, he seems to have been essentially a modest man and he did not wish to carry on in London forever. Late in May 1898 he left for Argentina, promising to be back in London the following February. Whether he did so is presently unclear. Several of his performances were later filmed.

His greatest success was in the Olympia Theatre in Paris, where he performed for more than a year. He continued to come back to Paris until 1910. He then for many years toured Italy and South America. Rather suddenly, in 1922, while performing in Niterói, a city across the bay, opposite Rio de Janeiro, he decided to quit the world of quick change.

He returned to Italy and subsequently inspired Futurist theatre performers, but very little information is available about him in English. He did write an autobiography (published by Rizzoli) and was the subject of another book (Fregoli, 1867–1936. Sa vie et ses secrets by Jean Nohain, Francois Caradec and Fregoli ). The poet Joan Brossa and the painter Antoni Tàpies made an artist's book relating to Fregoli.

He is buried in Italy with the words "His last transformation" on his gravestone.

== Legacy ==
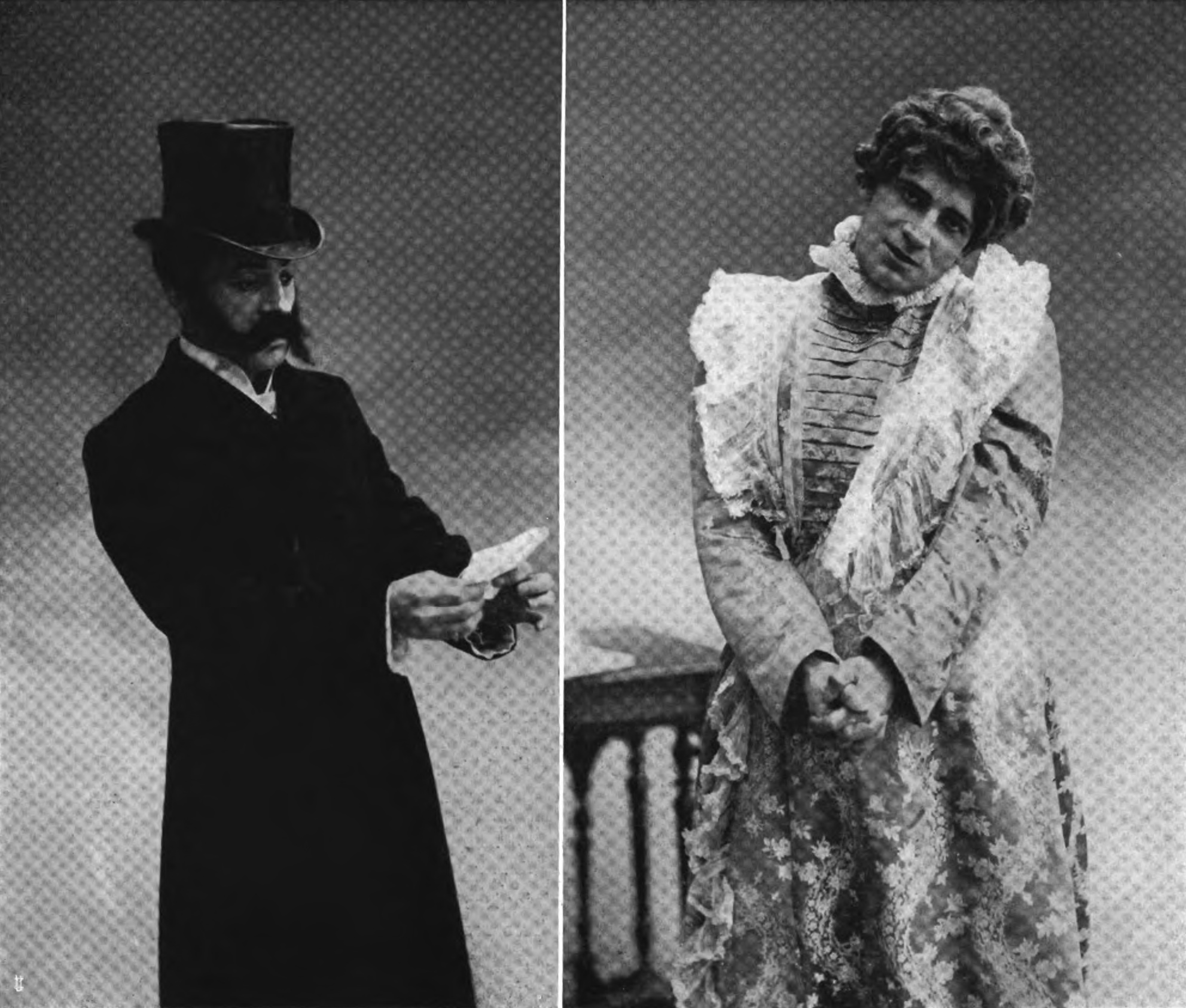
Two of Fregoli's characters from his show Camaleonte ("Chameleon")

Fregoli was thought to be the greatest, most versatile quick-change artist of his day. He was famous for his extraordinary ability in impersonations and his quickness in exchanging roles – so much so that while he was performing in London in the 1890s, rumours spread that there was more than one Fregoli. He quickly quashed these rumours by inviting journalists and doubters backstage to see him at work: Fregoli had no secrets. He even went to see the host of imitators he inspired ("The Great Trickoli" and "Fregolina" were some examples) and offered them advice about how to improve their performances.

The Fregoli delusion or Fregoli syndrome is a rare disorder in which a person holds a delusional belief that different people are in fact a single person who changes appearance or is in disguise. The syndrome may be related to a brain lesion and is often of a paranoid nature with the delusional person believing the person they believe to be in disguise is persecuting them.

=== Followers ===
The Italian magician and quick-change artist Arturo Brachetti is a follower of Fregoli's style. In 1979 he was the first quick change performer in the world after Fregoli. He reinvented the art and created new techniques for changing costume. His artistic career spanned genres including a wide range of acting, magic, and Chinese shadows. He is listed in the Guinness World Records as the quickest and most prolific performer in the world. His one-man show has been seen by more than 2,000,000 people worldwide.

Another famous Quick change artist is the Venetian Ennio Marchetto, who has created his own style of quick changes and impersonations. All his costumes, wigs and props are bi-dimensional and made out of cardboard and paper. His costumes transform in front of the audience like origami. Also called "The Living Cartoon," Ennio has enjoyed worldwide success since his first appearance at the Edinburgh Fringe in 1989.

Another follower was Lizzie Ramsden, billed as 'The Female Fregoli,' who appeared at Music Halls all over Britain and in America from about 1895 - 1904. Born in Bolton, Lancashire in 1867 she died in 1940 in Lambeth and is buried among the stars at Streatham Park Cemetery.
