= Ennio Marchetto =

Italian comedic live entertainer (born 1960)

- Born: 20 February 1960 (age 66); Venice, Italy
- Occupation: Stage comedian
- Years active: 1980s – present
- Website: enniomarchetto.com

Ennio Marchetto (Italian pronunciation: [ˈɛnnjo marˈketto]; born 20 February 1960) is an Italian comedic live entertainer whose performances feature quick-change artistry, impersonations and his trademark two-dimensional paper costumes. He is also known as The Living Paper Cartoon.

In his one-hour show he goes through more than fifty costume changes, in front of the audience without hiding behind drapes or screens and without any assistance by stage hands. In the last thirty years, Marchetto has performed in over 170 countries and has been seen by more than one million people. His shows have been honoured with numerous awards and highly praised by international critics.

== Biography ==
=== Early years ===
Marchetto was born next to playwright Carlo Goldoni's home. Inspired by cartoons, especially those by Walt Disney – he used to cut paper figures for his sister and decorations for the Christmas tree based on them – modern dance performances like those choreographed by Pina Bausch and the mime performer Lindsay Kemp, his career began during the 1980s with various performances during the Venetian Carnival.

Back then, Marchetto worked in his father's company, a repair shop for espresso machines. Everyone was convinced that he would carry on the family tradition, but Marchetto did not want to. While working there, he was lost in daydreams and in one of these he saw actress Marilyn Monroe before him – all dressed in paper. On the same day he created his first paper costume, which he showed to friends, family and amused people on the streets during the Carnival. In 1988, he received the Golden Lion prize from the Venice Entertainment Festival for his creations.

In subsequent years, he created more and more paper figures. With just a few costumes, Marchetto presented his show at the Zanzara d'Oro (the Golden Mosquito), an annual competition for young comedians. Marchetto was awarded the first prize and soon started appearing on television and in cabaret shows. He developed more and more characters and began to think about his own theatre show.

His first attempt was a written and staged piece by Daniele Sala, which was about the life of the famous change artist Leopoldo Fregoli at the turn of the century. Marchetto sang, acted and transformed himself in quick succession using his paper costumes. However, he soon realized that this kind of show was not what he had in mind and called it off after only four performances.

After his last performance, he met Dutch costume designer Sosthen Hennekam. This encounter was the beginning of a long and prolific collaboration. Sosthen devised numerous improvements. For example, he introduced the origami technique thanks to which it was possible to change the costumes even faster. After a few months, Hennekam and Marchetto had designed enough costumes for a one-hour show. At the moment, he has around 350 characters in his repertoire, often celebrities, but that also include other cultural icons and works of art. Marchetto's first performance of his new show was at the Festa dell'Unità in Bologna and it was an instant success, which led to other television and guest appearances throughout Italy.

In 1989, the London producer Glynis Henderson saw a video recording of the show and offered Marchetto a spot at the Edinburgh Festival Fringe; Marchetto accepted the invitation. However, half of his costumes were Italian celebrities, unknown by the festival's international audience. In just two weeks, Marchetto created eighteen new characters, including crowd favourites like Queen Elizabeth II, Freddie Mercury, Tina Turner and the Venus de Milo. The first few days in Edinburgh were very hard; there were only a few spectators, but then the first critic came in, Malcolm Hay from Time Out magazine. He wrote an enthusiastic article. A few days later, the show was sold out up to the last date and Marchetto became a festival cult star. From then on, everything moved on very fast.

=== 1990s ===
After several tours of the UK, guest performances in London's West End and at international festivals, Marchetto's and Hennekam's show was nominated at the Laurence Olivier Awards in 1993 in London for Best Entertainment. In the same year, Granada Television Celebrations produced Paper Marilyn, a one-hour documentary about Marchetto's life and his artistic career.

At the first MTV Europe Music Awards in Berlin the following year, Marchetto joined on stage with some of the same stars from his repertoire, including Prince, George Michael and Björk. Other international engagements followed, including a four-month run at the Théâtre Grevin in Paris, a Germany tour with Erasure and an appearance at Radio City Music Hall in New York City.

In 1995, Marchetto won the Performance d’Acteur prize at the Cannes Festival and in 1996, the FAD Sebastià Gasch Award in Barcelona.

In 1998, Marchetto was invited to perform with the Spice Girls, Bryan Adams and other artists on the Royal Variety Performance for then-Prince Charles, broadcast by the BBC. He was also commissioned to celebrate the birthday of Queen Beatrix of the Netherlands with an exclusive show for the Dutch royal family.

His off-off-Broadway show was nominated for a Drama Desk Award in 1999, followed by guest appearances in San Francisco and Los Angeles, where he received the Garland Award.

=== 2000s ===
In summer 2001, he was invited to perform at the White Tie and Tiara Ball, an AIDS gala hosted every year by Sir Elton John at his estate in Oxfordshire. The following year, Marchetto attended a performance by Elton John and José Carreras on the luxury liner Seven Seas Mariner.

He has toured extensively in Italy and performed in theatres, including Teatro Ciak in Milan, Teatro Parioli in Rome and Arena del Sole in Bologna. In Barcelona, he appeared for a six-week run at the Club Capitol. He also starred in various prime-time television programs.

In 2003, Marchetto returned to the UK and Ireland with sell-out shows. His great success was confirmed by appearances in the Live Floor Show on BBC2 and the Italian television show Uno di Noi with Gianni Morandi on Rai Uno.

After two months of guest performances in Berlin and Hamburg, Marchetto returned once again to Los Angeles to amuse audiences in packed houses. Furthermore, his performance was the opening show at the Napa Valley Opera House in Napa County, California, where seats were sold out for the entire three-week run.

Further guest performances in Germany and Edinburgh followed in 2004, after the première of Marchetto's new show in Amsterdam in the historic Nieuwe de la Mar Theater. He then performed in Palm Beach, Florida, at the Cuillo Centre for the Arts. Together with Nancy Sinatra, the New York Dolls, Morrissey and Sparks, he appeared at the Morrissey-launched Meltdown Festival at the Southbank Centre in London. In addition, he appeared again in the Royal Variety Show.

At the beginning of 2005, the 200th birthday of Danish writer Hans Christian Andersen was celebrated in Copenhagen's Parken Stadium and transmitted on television throughout Europe. For the occasion, Marchetto performed with specially designed costumes to honour the Anderson in front of the Danish royal family and 40,000 other spectators. Among the guests were also Olivia Newton-John, Tina Turner, Isabel Allende, Jean Michel Jarre and Sir Roger Moore.

In Paris's Auditorium Saint-Germain, Marchetto premiered with many new French characters and later in the winter season he returned once again to the city to perform at La Cigale. He was also seen on the French television show Star Académie. Marchetto continued to tour all over the world, in the U.S. (Los Angeles, Napa Valley and Austin), Hong Kong, Singapore and Germany (Mannheim, Düsseldorf and Berlin).

At the beginning of 2006, Marchetto continued his show in Berlin and started on an extensive tour to Italy. He performed for three weeks in Rome and returned to his hometown to perform at a special Carnival show at the Teatro Goldoni, filmed and broadcast by SkyTV several times. He also took part in various worldwide charities. At Berkeley Repertory Theater in California his show was an absolute summer hit. Marchetto ended the year with full houses in Rome and a special Christmas programme at the Southbank Centre in London, a show with many new pop icons, including Lily Allen, Boy George as a street sweeper and a crazy Vincent van Gogh in the style of Gnarls Barkley.

In 2007, Marchetto toured in Italy, Berlin, the Netherlands, New Zealand, South Africa, Dubai and the U.S. He was also a regular guest on the cult show Markette on the Italian television channel La7.

In 2008, he appeared in the music video for Blow-Up's song "John Travolta" for which he created an original costume and in January 2009, Marchetto appeared on the show World of Comedy (RTL), together with celebrities including Eminem and Gloria Gaynor.

=== 2010s ===
Marchetto continues to be extremely popular and tour the world with his show. He has been a recurring guest at the Tipi Am Kanzleramt in Berlin ever since 2008 and every year tours extensively in Germany. In 2010 and 2012, he took part in the Cavalchina Grand Ball at the Teatro La Fenice in Venice to celebrate the Carnival together with Grace Jones and Italian singer Ornella Vanoni.

In May 2011, Marchetto went on a short tour of Spain, followed by an appearance at the Festival Ple de Riure. Later in the year, he was invited to perform at the New York Musical Theatre Festival and in October he performed at the Jürgen Hart Satire Matinee at the end of the Leipziger Lachmesse.

Over the next few years, he took part in several television programmes in Belgium, Spain, Brazil, the Netherlands and Italy (Zelig). For the first time in 2013 he performed on the Chinese television programme CCTV International Humour Festival and again in 2015 he participated in the Chinese New Year's celebrations on the BTV Spring Gala, alongside many Chinese and international artists, including Celine Dion.

== Awards ==
- 1987: Golden Lion, Venice Entertainment Festival
- 1988: Zanzara d'Oro, "Best New Comedian" category, Bologna
- 1994: nominated for the Laurence Olivier Award for Best Entertainment
- 1995: "Best Show", Cannes Performance d'Acteur
- 1996: FAD Sebastià Gasch Award, Barcelona
- 1999: nominated for Drama Desk Award for a "Unique Theatrical Experience", New York
- 1999: Back Stage West Garland Award, "Best Costume Design" category, Los Angeles
- 2007: Arosa Schneestern, Audience award from the Arosa Humor-Festival
- 2008: Nominated for an IRNE Award, "Best solo performance at a large theatre" category, Boston
- 2011: NYMF award for "Outstanding Performance", New York Musical Theatre Festival, New York
