= Eurovision (network) =

Television network that is part of the European Broadcasting Union

- Branding: Eurovision
- Headquarters: Geneva, Switzerland
- Owner: European Broadcasting Union
- Launch date: 6 June 1954; 72 years ago
- Official website: eurovisionservices.com

Eurovision is a pan-European television telecommunications network owned and operated by the European Broadcasting Union (EBU). It was officially founded in 1954 in Geneva, Switzerland, and its first official transmission took place on 6 June 1954. In the lead-up to the network's formal establishment, the coronation of Elizabeth II on 2 June 1953 was one of the first events to be broadcast across Europe.

Major television broadcasts are distributed live through the Eurovision network to EBU members. Members share breaking news footage through the daily Eurovision news exchange (EVN). They also exchange television programmes through the network.

The EBU department that operated the Eurovision network became a separate joint-stock company under Swiss law (Aktiengesellschaft or société anonyme) in 2019, with the EBU as its sole shareholder.

In January 2023, Eurovision Services was sold to a German investment advisory company, DUBAG AG, based in Munich. The terms of the agreement were not published.

The EBU has also owned and operated a radio counterpart, Euroradio, since 1989.

== Background ==
Logo of Eurovision used from 1 December 2012 to 31 December 2025.

The name "Eurovision" was originally coined by British journalist George Campey when writing for the Evening Standard, and was adopted by the EBU for its network.

The first official Eurovision transmission took place on 6 June 1954. It broadcast the Narcissus Festival in Montreux, Switzerland, followed by an evening program from Rome, including a tour of the Vatican, an address from Pope Pius XII and an apostolic blessing. A year before the official launch, the Coronation of Elizabeth II was one of the first Eurovision broadcasts. Sports programming was the compelling reason for Eurovision; sports were 518 of 645 programs shared on the network in 1970. Eurovision was managed by the European Broadcasting Union's Eurovision Operations Department and offered permanent coverage of Europe, the Americas, the Middle East, North Africa and the Asia-Pacific region, as well as ad-hoc coverage of the African continent and the Pacific Rim.

Not confined only to Europe, the EBU is the "largest community of public service media organizations throughout the world". It currently encompasses 117 television broadcasting organizations located in 57 countries of Europe, North Africa, and the Middle East, for a total of 68 associated broadcasting organizations in Europe, Africa, America, Asia, and Oceania.

== Eurovision events ==
The European Broadcasting Union in co-operation with the respective host broadcaster, organises competitions and events in which its members can participate.

=== Eurovision Song Contest ===
Logo of the Eurovision Song Contest

The Eurovision Song Contest (ESC) is an annual pan-European song competition organized annually since 1956. Each participating broadcaster submits an original song representing its country to be performed live via the Eurovision and Euroradio networks. It stands as one of the world's longest-running and most-watched non-sporting television programs, drawing millions of global viewers each year. The contest is traditionally hosted by the country that won the previous year's edition, turning the event into a massive tourism and cultural showcase for the host city.

The competition operates on a structured format of live performances followed by a rigorous voting process. Each participating nation sends one musical act to perform a song lasting no longer than three minutes. After all contestants have performed, viewers and professional music juries from each country cast votes for their favorite entries, though voters are strictly barred from voting for their own nation. The country with the highest accumulated score at the end of the voting sequence is declared the winner and receives the iconic glass microphone trophy. Over the decades, the voting has evolved from simple telephone lines to a complex system combining international jury points with global televoting and online apps.

Beyond its cultural status, Eurovision has served as a powerful platform for geopolitical expression and music industry breakthroughs. The contest has famously launched the international careers of legendary artists, including ABBA, Celine Dion, and Måneskin. While the EBU maintains a strict policy banning political statements during the broadcast, the event frequently mirrors contemporary European relations, societal shifts, and regional alliances through public voting patterns and artistic themes. Today, it remains a celebrated symbol of European unity and diverse musical expression.

=== Junior Eurovision Song Contest ===
Logo of the Junior Eurovision Song Contest

The Junior Eurovision Song Contest (JESC) is a spin-off of the main Eurovision Song Contest for children aged 9 to 14. Established in 2003, the contest mirrors the adult version but focuses on showcasing young musical talent from participating countries. Unlike the main contest, the winning nation does not automatically host the next edition; the host country is chosen through a bidding process organized by the EBU.

The competition features original songs performed live, with a format designed to ensure a supportive environment for young performers. Winners are determined by a combination of professional national juries and a global online public vote, which allows fans to vote for their own countries. The contest serves as an early career launchpad for young artists and promotes cultural exchange and friendship among youth across Europe and beyond.

=== Eurovision Song Contest Asia ===
The Eurovision Song Contest Asia is a music competition aimed in the Asia-Pacific region in partnership with media companies Voxovation and S2O Productions. Officially announced on March 31, 2026, the event marks the first multi-country franchise expansion of the Eurovision brand outside of Europe. The inaugural edition takes place in Bangkok, Thailand.

The contest is structured to mirror the long-standing European format, featuring live television performances of original three-minute songs. Each participating broadcaster is responsible for managing its own national selection process to choose its representative artist and song. To incentivize high-level competition, the EBU has announced that the winner of the inaugural Asian contest will earn a guest performance spot at the main Eurovision Song Contest in 2027.

=== Other competitions ===
==== Eurovision Young Musicians ====
The Eurovision Young Musicians is a biennial international classical music competition. Established in 1982, the event showcases outstanding young classical instrumentalists aged between 12 and 21 from participating nations. Modeled closely after the Eurovision Song Contest, it stands as one of the most prestigious classical music events on television, aimed at providing an international platform and springboard for emerging artists. Unlike the flagship song contest, the winning nation does not automatically host the next edition, with venues instead selected independently by the EBU.

The format consists of musicians performing a solo classical piece of their choice, backed by the host broadcaster's symphony orchestra. Rather than public voting, the winners are determined exclusively by an international panel of professional, expert music juries who grade contestants on technical precision, musicality, and stage presence. Over its history, the competition has helped launch the professional careers of world-renowned artists such as violinist Julian Rachlin and cellist Natalie Clein.

==== Let the Peoples Sing ====
Let the Peoples Sing is a biennial international choral competition dedicated to celebrating and showcasing elite amateur choral singing. Founded 1961, the event is primarily structured as a live multiplex radio broadcast via the Euroradio network where non-professional choirs from across the globe compete across two main categories: Adult, and Children and Youth. An international panel of professional musical judges assesses each choir based on live performances broadcast directly from their home countries. Rather than receiving a standard trophy, the absolute top-scoring choir across both categories is awarded the prestigious Silver Rose Bowl, with Denmark's Copenhagen Girls' Choir earning the honor as the most recent champion during the October 2024 edition.

=== Discontinued competitions ===
==== Jeux sans frontières ====
Jeux sans frontières (English: Games Without Frontiers, or Games Without Borders) was a Europe-wide television game show organized by the EBU that ran for 30 seasons between 1965 and 1999. Originally conceived by French President Charles de Gaulle to foster post-war friendship between French and German youth, the competition expanded to feature towns and cities from across Europe competing in absurd, highly physical tasks while wearing giant, outlandish foam-and-latex costumes. Each episode was hosted live by a different participating country, with local broadcasters transmitting the action across the unified Eurovision network. While widely celebrated across the continent for decades—and known fondly in the United Kingdom under its domestic name, It's a Knockout—the elaborate, high-budget production was eventually cancelled by the EBU due to soaring costs and declining viewership at the turn of the century.

==== Eurovision Young Dancers ====
Eurovision Young Dancers was a biennial televised dance competition for non-professional performers aged 16 to 21. Launched in 1985 as a parallel event to Eurovision Young Musicians, the contest allowed solo acts and couples to showcase various dance styles, including ballet, jazz, and hip-hop. An international panel of professional dance experts evaluated the live solo and group routines, narrowing the competitors down to a final 90-second "dance-off" duel to crown the champion. Spain stands as the most successful nation in the tournament's history with five victories, while Paulina Bidzińska from Poland won the most recent edition held in Prague in December 2017. The event was ultimately cancelled and permanently ruled out by the EBU due to a lack of broadcasting interest.

==== Eurovision Choir ====
Logo of Eurovision Choir

Eurovision Choir (formerly Eurovision Choir of the Year) was a biennial choral launched by the EBU and the Interkultur Foundation, modelled after the latter's World Choir Games. First launched in 2017 in Latvia, the event serves as a visual, television-focused counterpart to older radio-centric choral contests. It features top-class, non-professional choirs selected by their respective national broadcasters to perform unaccompanied, four-to-six-minute sets reflecting regional or national traditions. Instead of utilizing public telephone voting, a small panel of elite, professional musical juries evaluates the acts live on stage to crown the champion.The contest returned for a second edition in August 2019 staged in Gothenburg, Sweden. In October 2024, following the cancellation of the 2021 and 2023 contests, the EBU confirmed that it was not considering organising a new edition in 2025 making it unlikely that the contest will return in the near future. This was reaffirmed in January 2026.

==== European Championships ====
Logo of the European Championships

The European Championships was a quadrennial multi-sport event designed to combine the existing continental championships of Europe’s leading sports into a single, high-profile tournament. Inaugurated in 2018 across the co-host cities of Berlin and Glasgow, and followed by a highly successful second edition in Munich in 2022, the event was heavily supported by the EBU to maximize free-to-air television exposure across the continent. The collaborative format allowed individual sports, such as athletics, cycling, rowing, and gymnastics, to share resources and capture a massive aggregated audience. However, the unified multi-sport framework collapsed when the organizing venture dissolved, leading to the definitive cancellation of the planned 2026 combined event.

=== Other events ===
Routine transmissions of sport and culture events amount to over 15,000 transmission hours per year. High-profile Eurovision events include:

- The Proms
- Eastertime papal blessing Urbi et Orbi
- Euroclassic Notturno
- Palio in Siena
- Rose d'Or
- Musikantenstadl
- Stadlshow
- Vienna New Year's Concert
- Sanremo Music Festival
- Summer Night Concert Schönbrunn
- Congratulations: 50 Years of the Eurovision Song Contest
- Eurovision Dance Contest
- Magic Circus Show
- Eurovision Song Contest's Greatest Hits
- Eurosonic Noorderslag
- European Border Breakers Award
- Rockpalast Nacht
- Euroradio Folk Festival
- Eurovision Debate
- Eurovision: Europe Shine a Light

== News ==
Member broadcasting organisations also provide each other with news footage (over 30,000 separate news items per year) within the framework of the daily Eurovision News Exchanges (EVN). Eurovision also sponsors the annual broadcast news industry conference, News Xchange. Despite the similarity in name this has no direct connection with Eurovision News Exchanges.

== Eurovision Sports ==
Eurovision has offered free internet streaming of major sports events such as the London 2012 Olympics on its website, under the name Eurovision Sports.

Eurovision Sports also offered all FIFA World Cup coverage for 2018 and 2022, and coverage of the 2021 FINA World Swimming Championships.

Eurosport, now owned by Warner Bros. Discovery, was first created in 1989 by the EBU as a method of exploiting the member stations' sports rights.

=== Digital streaming platform ===
The EBU launched on 5 February 2024 a digital streaming platform for the business-to-consumer market called Eurovision Sport. The platform is accessible via the website eurovisionsport.com and as an app for Android and iOS mobile and tablet devices, and via connected TVs and selected free ad-supported streaming television channels.

== Transmission ident ==
Eurovision television transmissions may be recognised by the Eurovision ident and the opening theme of Marc-Antoine Charpentier's "Te Deum" which appears before and after the programme to indicate to viewers they are connected and watching via the Eurovision network. The most famous and well known times for this to occur is before and after the Eurovision Song Contest, although most contributed items, such as international relays of sports events, including the Olympics, are not thus credited and the general public is therefore mostly unaware of Eurovision's involvement.
