= Gospel magic =

Category of magic used to promote Christian messages

Gospel magic is the use of otherwise standard stage magic tricks and illusions as object lessons to promote Christian messages. Gospel magic does not claim to invoke spirits or paranormal powers. Gospel magic is intended to present the Christian good news through "visual parables"; the trick or illusion is used to present theological points in an entertaining way with the intention that people will remember the message. Gospel magic is generally presented as stage magic or platform magic, but it can be adapted to close-up magic or micromagic situations.

== History ==
The first modern use of Gospel magic is in the ministry of the Italian Catholic priest Giovanni Melchiorre Bosco (Don Bosco, 1815–1888). His autobiography lists many dozens of magic tricks used for the purpose of offering religious instruction to children and youth. Don Bosco has been seen as the Patron Saint of Catholic Magicians and, specifically, Catholic Gospel Magicians.

In 1910, Rev. C. H. (Clarence Herbert) Woolston (1856-1927) published Seeing Truth: Object Lessons with Magical and Mechanical Effects which aimed to help adults working with children in church. Woolston was a Baptist minister who was instructed in magic by famed magician Howard Thurston (1869-1936). Woolston also wrote three other books on the subject: Penny Object Lessons (1916), The Curiosity Book (1922), and The Bible Object Book (1926). Other texts were soon written that incorporated Gospel messages with magic.

In 1953, the International Fellowship of Christian Magicians began in the US. This rapidly spread the use of the creative arts to teach the Gospel. An international magazine, The Voice of the FCM, is published every two months. Annual conventions are held in US, UK and Germany.

== See also ==
- Silvio Mantelli
- Illusionist
- List of magic tricks

== Bibliography ==
- Miller, Jule L. Spiritual Applications for Tarbell I. Gospel Services, 1976.
- Miller, Jule L. Spiritual Applications for Tarbell II. Gospel Services, 1984.

→These books are based on the Tarbell Course, a standard for stage magicians pre-World War II. It was originally intended to be expanded to cover all eight-volumes in the Tarbell Series, but Miller died before this project was completed. This work is slowly being completed by other magicians unofficially.

- Laflin, Duane. Grand Gospel Magic Routines. Laflin Magic, Branson, OH, 2017.
- Oswald, G and Anderson, K. Gospel Patter for Fifty Familiar Effects. 2007
- Regling, Dennis.52 Weeks of Gospel Magic
- Stagnaro, Angelo. The Catechist's Magic Kit. Crossroad Publishing. 2009.
- Thompson, AD Gospel Magic How to use magic Tricks as Visual Aids, Grove Books Limited Cambridge UK 2001
