= Keelan Leyser =

British magician

Keelan Leyser is a British-born magician, mentalist and quick change artist, who is known for his multiple television appearances spanning over 25 years. He is recognised for his magic with digital technology and his quick change act.

== Early life ==
Leyser was raised in Coulsdon, Surrey. He attended The John Fisher School in Purley. Leyser was inspired to become a magician at the age of four after seeing magician Lance Burton perform in Las Vegas. In 1994, when he was 13 years old, Leyser won the title of British Junior Magical Champion at the British Magical Championships. When Leyser was 15 years old he performed for Prince Charles in Croydon, Surrey. After performing on many television shows, including Surprise Surprise, Blue Peter and This Morning, he went on to tour the UK alongside Basil Brush in a show called The Fox Factor. Leyser was the magic consultant for the BBC 1 TV series Dick & Dom in da Bungalow. In 2005, he won the cabaret section of Ceroc's Modern Jive Championships. In 2007, Leyser won the titles of British Magical Grand Prix Champion and the British Magical Champion of General Magic at the Blackpool Magic Convention. In 2010, he was one of the main performers in the Hocus Pocus show in Cairo, Egypt. As of 2019 Leyser resides in Las Vegas, Nevada, US.

== Television career ==
Leyser's first appearance on British television was on Cilla Black's Surprise Surprise in 1994, where he performed a trick with Geoffrey Durham. After that, the BBC filmed a documentary about Leyser on The Lowdown series called The Magical World of Keelan Leyser, which was broadcast on BBC 1 on 16 April 1996 and described him as "the next David Copperfield".

Leyser was one of the main magicians on the 10-part TV series Playing Tricks created by Endemol and broadcast first on the Trouble channel in October 2003.

He competed on the third season of Britain's Got Talent in 2009 with his quick change act.

In 2011, Leyser appeared alongside partner Charlotte Marie on the first season of Penn & Teller: Fool Us with his quick change act, but failed to fool the duo. His act on the show has gained over 15 million views on YouTube. In 2013, he competed on the French TV show The Best: Le Meilleur Artiste on TF1 and was judged by fellow quick change artist Arturo Brachetti, who gave their performance a 7.5 rating. On 19 January 2013, Leyser was again with Marie as the main guest act on BBC 1's Britain's Brightest. During the show, Leyser and Marie performed their act, then host Clare Balding tested the contestants' memory about the act. In 2014, Leyser performed his Digital Magic Act with ShahRukh Khan and Deepika Padukone for the music launch of the Bollywood film Happy New Year.

On 1 February 2015 Leyser trained Emmerdale actors Matthew Wolfenden and Natalie Anderson to perform his quick change act with himself and his dance partner Shereen on Get Your Act Together, presented by Stephen Mulhern on ITV. On 6 February 2016, Leyser performed for the first time on The CW's Masters of Illusion, an American television show about magic, by performing his quick change act with Shereen. In 2018, he returned twice more on season 6 of Masters of Illusion, performing technology-themed magic tricks with iPads and iPhones. He made another appearance on Penn & Teller: Fool Us on 23 September 2019, where he performed a prediction trick with Instagram, iPads and an iPhone.

In February 2022, Leyser was a featured guest on the Huckabee show on Trinity Broadcasting Network, where he performed his iPad act and a mind reading trick with Mike Huckabee.

== Awards ==
- British Junior Magical Champion 1995
- British Magical Grand Prix Champion 2007
- British Magical Champion of General Magic 2007
