= Billy George (acrobat) =

British gymnast

- Born: 4 April 1991 (age 34); Batley, Kirklees, West Yorkshire, England
- Years active: 2011–present
- Website: https://twitter.com/billyjacques https://www.instagram.com/billyjacques/

Billy George (born 4 April 1991) is a British acrobat.

== Education ==
George trained IDTA Ballet, Tap, and Modern Jazz at his mother's dance school, Armley Dance Studios, Leeds. Billy attended Intake Arts College in Bramley, Leeds, a specialist performing arts school. In 2009, he attended the National Centre for Circus Arts in London formally known as Circus Space.

== Career ==
George first became well known on the sixth series of Britain's Got Talent where he was a semi-finalist. He then went on to be a professional gymnast on BBC series, Tumble, where his celebrity partner was TOWIE's Lucy Mecklenburgh. He was a trainer on Get Your Act Together, training TOWIE's Elliott Wright. In 2015, Billy joined Diversity on their UK Arena tour of 'Up Close and Personal' as a Special Guest.
