= Laflin =

Laflin may refer to:

- Laflin, Missouri
- Laflin, Pennsylvania
- Addison H. Laflin, a New York politician
- Bonnie-Jill Laflin, an American model and television personality
- Duane Laflin, a magician
- Fordyce L. Laflin, a New York politician
- Matthew Laflin, an American 19th-century businessman
