= Sos and Victoria Petrosyan =

German magician duo

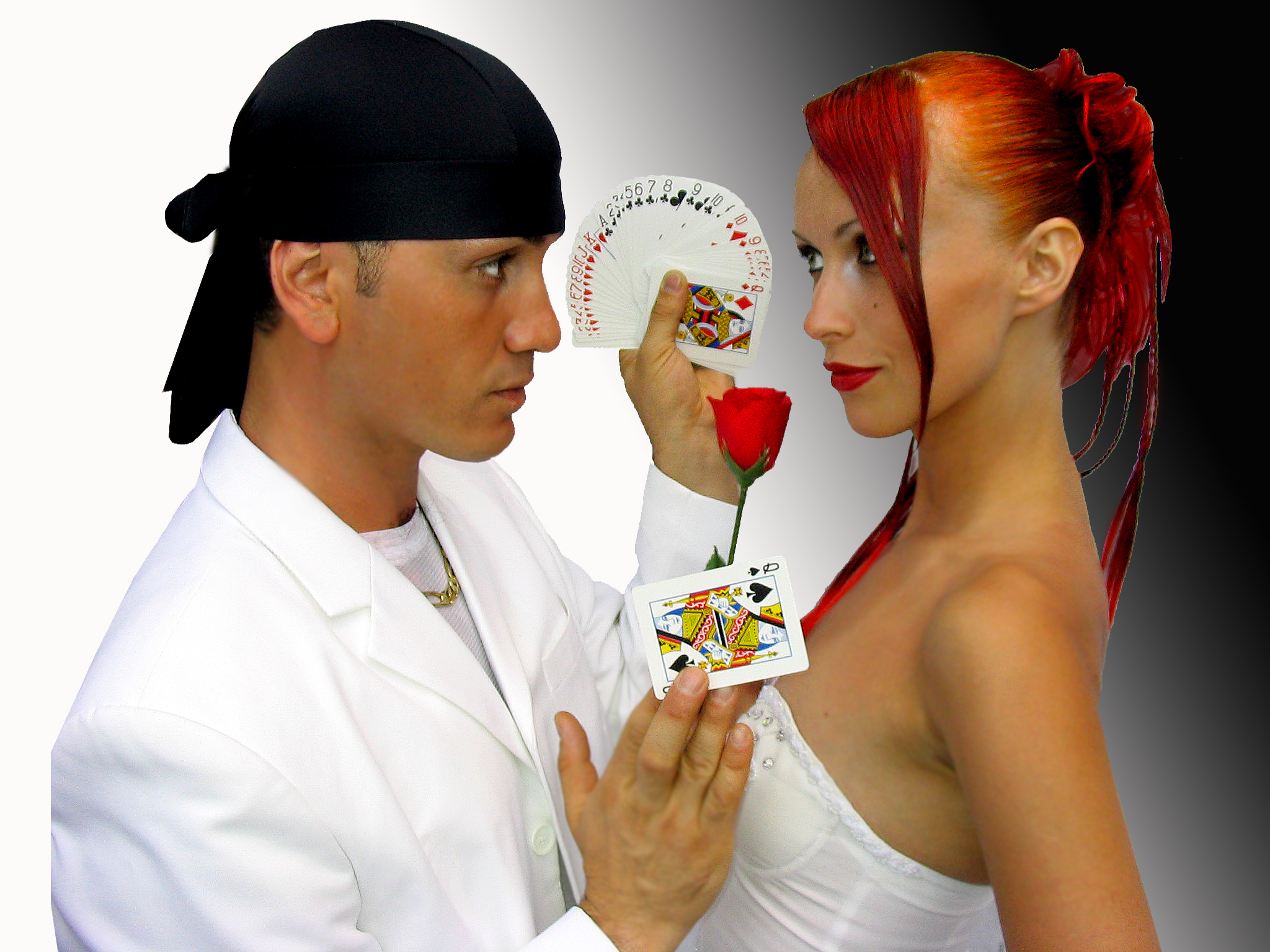

Sos and Victoria are a husband and wife quick-change artist act. Sos and his wife Victoria are from Altrip, Germany. The pair began their act in 1991, and have earned several awards and achieving a Guinness World Record for their performances.

In 2011 they got to the semi-final of the German TV Show Das Supertalents. In 2012, they performed in at the "China International 'Great Wall' Magic Carnival" in Beijing. In 2016, they competed on the eleventh season of America's Got Talent.
