= Tumble (TV series) =

British celebrity gymnastics show (2014)

- Created by: Jimmy Baker; J Bidmead; Aniello DeSanti; Leon Wilde
- Directed by: Phil Heyes
- Presented by: Alex Jones
- Judges: Nadia Comăneci; Louis Smith; Craig Heap; Sebastien Stella
- Narrated by: Mitch Fenner
- Theme music composer: Paul Farrer
- Country of origin: United Kingdom
- Original language: English
- No. of series: 1
- No. of episodes: 6

Production
- Executive producers: Rachel Arnold; Cat Lawson
- Production location: Elstree Studios
- Editor: Andrew Cartmell
- Camera setup: Multi-camera
- Running time: 90 minutes

Original release
- Network: BBC One
- Release: 9 August – 13 September 2014

Tumble (originally Let's Get Ready to Tumble) is a British television show, featuring celebrities taking part in gymnastics to win the votes of the public. Learning sessions were given on the basics of gymnastics to the celebrities taking part. The show was backed by British Gymnastics. The trainers were the same ones who trained Louis Smith and Beth Tweddle. The show was broadcast live over six episodes on BBC One, starting on 9 August 2014.

The series was hosted by Alex Jones. The judges were Nadia Comăneci, Louis Smith, Craig Heap and Sebastien Stella. On occasions the judges would perform a routine.

On 14 November 2014, BBC One cancelled the show after only one series.

== Production ==
The television show was commissioned by Charlotte Moore and Mark Lindsay. Katie Taylor, the controller of BBC entertainment and events, said: "One thing’s for certain, you can expect the celebs to be pushed out of their comfort zone in what is probably the most physically demanding show of its kind anywhere in the world." BBC Worldwide has invested in the series. Charlotte Moore said: "Let's Get Ready to Tumble will see brave celebrity contestants sign up to the toughest live Saturday night TV challenge yet!"

== Couples ==
The celebrities taking part were announced on 13 June 2014. On 25 July, it was announced that fitness instructor & motivational speaker Mr Motivator had withdrawn from the programme after dislocating his knee, necessitating surgery. His professional partner Kerry Scotts withdrew as well. On 28 July, it was confirmed that screen actor Peter Duncan was to replace Mr Motivator in the competition with his partner Kate McWilliam.

Celebrity	Known for	Professional partner	Status
Andrea McLean	Loose Women panellist	Alex Uttley	Eliminated 1st on 16 August 2014
Emma Samms	Dynasty actress	Ivan Pastore	Eliminated 2nd on 23 August 2014
John Partridge	Former EastEnders actor	Kat Would	Eliminated 3rd on 30 August 2014
Peter Duncan	Former Blue Peter presenter & actor	Kate McWilliam	Eliminated 4th on 6 September 2014
Amelle Berrabah	Sugababes singer	Doug Fordyce	Eliminated 5th on 13 September 2014
Carl Froch	Retired professional boxer	Sita Bhuller	Eliminated 5th on 13 September 2014
Lucy Mecklenburgh	Former The Only Way Is Essex star	Billy George	Eliminated 5th on 13 September 2014
Sarah Harding	Former Girls Aloud singer	Leon Fagbemi	Runners-up on 13 September 2014
Ian "H" Watkins	Steps singer	Holly Johnstone	Runners-up on 13 September 2014
Bobby Lockwood	Wolfblood & House of Anubis actor	Kristin Allen	Winner on 13 September 2014

== Scoring chart ==
Couple	Place	1	2	PB (1+2)	3	4	5	6
Bobby & Kristin	1	26.0	28.0	28.0	32.5	35.0	36.0+32.5=68.5	33.5
H & Holly	2	26.5	31.0	31.0	26.5	34.0	33.5+29.0=62.5	40.0
Sarah & Leon	2	25.0	28.5	28.5	26.5	29.0	29.5+21.0=50.5	38.0
Lucy & Billy	6	20.0	28.5	28.5	29.5	28.0	28.5+26.5=55.0	35.0
Carl & Sita	6	26.0	24.5	26.0	29.5	31.0	33.0+30.5=63.5	38.0
Amelle & Doug	6	24.0	29.0	29.0	24.0	29.5	32.5+31.5=64.0	36.0
Peter & Kate	7	23.5	26.0	26.0	29.5	31.0	26.0+24.5=50.5	
John & Kat	8	27.5	28.5	28.5	30.0	26.0		
Emma & Ivan	9	21.0	30.0	30.0	23.5			
Andrea & Alex	10	21.0	22.0	22.0				

indicates the couple eliminated that week
indicates the couple were in the bottom two but not eliminated
indicates the couple were eliminated immediately (no bottom two)
indicates the winning couple
indicates the runner-up couples
Green scores indicate the highest score for that week
Red scores indicate the lowest score for that week
"—" indicates the couple(s) that did not perform that week

=== Average chart ===
This table only counts for performances scored on a traditional 40-point scale.

Rank by average	Place	Couple	Total	Number of disciplines	Average
1	1	Bobby & Kristin	223.5	7	31.9
2	2	H & Holly	220.5	7	31.5
3	4	Carl & Sita	212.5	7	30.4
4	4	Amelle & Doug	206.5	7	29.5
5	2	Sarah & Leon	197.5	7	28.2
6	4	Lucy & Billy	196.0	7	28.0
6	8	John & Kat	112.0	4	28.0
8	7	Peter & Kate	160.5	6	26.8
9	9	Emma & Ivan	74.5	3	24.8
10	10	Andrea & Alex	43.0	2	21.5

== Highest and lowest scoring performances of the series ==
The best and worst performances in each discipline according to the judges' 40-points scale are as follows:

Discipline	Celebrity	Highest score	Celebrity	Lowest score
Aerial Hoop	Ian "H" Watkins	31.0	Andrea McLean	21.0
Floor	Bobby Lockwood	36.0	Lucy Mecklenburgh	20.0
Rhythmic	Bobby Lockwood	34.5	Emma Samms	23.5
Trampoline	Bobby Lockwood	35.0	John Partridge	26.0
Parallel bars	Bobby Lockwood	32.5	Peter Duncan	24.5
Beam	Amelle Berrabah	31.5	Sarah Harding	21.0
Trapeze	Ian "H" Watkins	40.0	Bobby Lockwood	33.5

== Weekly scores and songs ==
=== Week 1 (9 August) ===
- Additional performance: Louis Smith (plus Kristian Thomas, Max Whitlock, Adam Cox, Nile Wilson and Daniel Purvis) - “Runaway Baby” by Bruno Mars

Order	Couple	Judges' scores				Total	Scoreboard	Discipline	Song
Order	Couple	Stella	Smith	Comăneci	Heap	Total	Scoreboard	Discipline	Song
1	Amelle & Doug	7.0	5.5	6.5	5.0	24.0	6th	Aerial hoop	"Man in the Mirror" — Michael Jackson
2	Peter & Kate	6.5	5.5	7.0	4.5	23.5	7th	Floor	"It's a Man's Man's Man's World" — Seal
3	Andrea & Alex	6.0	5.0	5.5	4.5	21.0	=8th	Aerial hoop	"No More Tears (Enough Is Enough)" — Barbra Streisand & Donna Summer
4	H & Holly	8.0	6.5	6.5	5.5	26.5	2nd	Floor	"Johnny B. Goode" — Chuck Berry
5	Bobby & Kristin	7.0	7.0	6.5	5.5	26.0	=3rd	Aerial hoop	"All of Me" — John Legend
6	Lucy & Billy	5.0	4.5	6.0	4.5	20.0	10th	Floor	"Good Time" — Owl City & Carly Rae Jepsen
7	Sarah & Leon	8.0	5.5	6.0	5.5	25.0	5th	Aerial hoop	"You've Got The Love" — Florence and the Machine
8	Emma & Ivan	5.5	4.5	6.5	4.5	21.0	=8th	Floor	"Get The Party Started" — Dame Shirley Bassey
9	Carl & Sita	6.5	6.0	7.0	6.5	26.0	=3rd	Aerial hoop	"I Just Want To Make Love To You" — Etta James
10	John & Kat	8.0	7.0	7.0	5.5	27.5	1st	Floor	"Of the Night" — Bastille

=== Week 2 (16 August) ===
- Additional performance: Beth Tweddle - “Rule The World” by Take That

Order	Couple	Judges' scores				Total	Scoreboard	Discipline	Song	Result
Order	Couple	Stella	Smith	Comăneci	Heap	Total	Scoreboard	Discipline	Song	Result
1	John & Kat	6.5	7.0	7.5	7.5	28.5	=5th	Aerial hoop	"Ain't That a Kick in the Head" — Dean Martin	Safe
2	Bobby & Kristin	7.0	7.0	7.0	7.0	28.0	7th	Floor	"Kiss You" — One Direction	Safe
3	H & Holly	7.5	8.0	7.5	8.0	31.0	1st	Aerial hoop	"I Believe in a Thing Called Love" — The Darkness	Safe
4	Sarah & Leon	7.0	7.0	7.5	7.0	28.5	=5th	Floor	"Rather Be" — Clean Bandit	Safe
5	Carl & Sita	6.0	5.5	7.0	6.0	24.5	9th	Floor	"Viva La Vida" — Coldplay	Safe
6	Emma & Ivan	7.5	7.0	8.0	7.5	30.0	2nd	Aerial hoop	"No More I Love Yous" — Annie Lennox	Safe
7	Amelle & Doug	6.5	7.5	7.0	8.0	29.0	=3rd	Floor	"It's Oh So Quiet" — Björk	Safe
8	Peter & Kate	7.5	6.0	6.5	6.0	26.0	8th	Aerial hoop	"Footloose" — Kenny Loggins	Bottom two
9	Andrea & Alex	5.5	5.5	6.0	5.0	22.0	10th	Floor	"Pure Shores" — All Saints	Eliminated
10	Lucy & Billy	7.0	7.0	7.5	7.0	28.5	=5th	Aerial hoop	"Somewhere Only We Know" — Lily Allen	Safe

=== Week 3 (23 August) ===
- Additional performance: The Saturdays - "Up"/"Higher"/"All Fired Up"/"Ego"/"What About Us"

Order	Couple	Judges' scores				Total	Scoreboard	Discipline	Song	Result
Order	Couple	Stella	Smith	Comăneci	Heap	Total	Scoreboard	Discipline	Song	Result
1	Carl & Sita	6.5	7.0	8.0	8.0	29.5	=3rd	Trampoline	"Bamboléo" — Gipsy Kings	Safe
2	H & Holly	7.0	6.0	7.0	6.5	26.5	=6th	Trampoline	"Summer" — Calvin Harris	Safe
3	Lucy & Billy	7.0	7.5	7.5	7.5	29.5	=3rd	Trampoline	"The Only Way Is Up" — Yazz	Safe
4	Peter & Kate	6.5	7.5	8.0	7.5	29.5	=3rd	Trampoline	"Jump Around" — House of Pain	Safe
5	Sarah & Leon	6.0	6.5	7.0	7.0	26.5	=6th	Trampoline	"Burn" — Ellie Goulding	Safe
6	Amelle & Doug	6.0	5.0	6.5	6.5	24.0	8th	Rhythmic	"These Boots Are Made for Walkin'" — The Supremes	Bottom two
7	Emma & Ivan	6.0	5.0	6.5	6.0	23.5	9th	Rhythmic	"Ghost" — Ella Henderson	Eliminated
8	John & Kat	7.5	7.5	7.5	7.5	30.0	2nd	Rhythmic	"Should I Stay or Should I Go" — The Clash	Safe
9	Bobby & Kristin	8.0	8.0	8.0	8.5	32.5	1st	Rhythmic	"Everybody Get Up" — 5ive	Safe

=== Week 4 (30 August) ===
- Additional performance: Circulus

Order	Couple	Judges' scores				Total	Scoreboard	Discipline	Song	Result
Order	Couple	Stella	Smith	Comăneci	Heap	Total	Scoreboard	Discipline	Song	Result
1	John & Kat	6.0	6.0	7.0	7.0	26.0	8th	Trampoline	"Treasure" — Bruno Mars	Eliminated
2	Amelle & Doug	7.0	7.0	7.5	8.0	29.5	5th	Trampoline	"Diamonds" — Rihanna	Safe
3	Peter & Kate	7.5	7.0	8.0	8.5	31.0	=3rd	Rhythmic	"Money, Money, Money" — ABBA	Safe
4	Bobby & Kristin	8.5	9.0	9.0	8.5	35.0	1st	Trampoline	"Rocket Man" — Elton John	Safe
5	Sarah & Leon	7.5	7.0	7.0	7.5	29.0	6th	Rhythmic	"Le Freak" — Chic	Safe
6	Carl & Sita	8.0	7.5	8.0	7.5	31.0	=3rd	Rhythmic	"Born To Be Wild" — Steppenwolf	Safe
7	Lucy & Billy	7.5	7.0	7.0	6.5	28.0	7th	Rhythmic	"I Put a Spell on You" — Nina Simone	Bottom Two
8	H & Holly	9.0	8.0	8.5	8.5	34.0	2nd	Rhythmic	"Don't Rain on My Parade" from Funny Girl	Safe

=== Week 5 (6 September) ===
- Additional performance: Sebastien Stella

Order	Couple	Judges' scores				Total	Scoreboard	Discipline	Song	Result
Order	Couple	Stella	Smith	Comăneci	Heap	Total	Scoreboard	Discipline	Song	Result
1	Peter & Kate	6.5	5.5	7.0	7.0	26.0	7th	Acro-floor	"I Wan'na Be Like You" — Robbie Williams feat. Olly Murs	Eliminated
2	Sarah & Leon	7.0	7.5	7.5	7.5	29.5	5th	Acro-floor	"Don't Let Go (Love)" — En Vogue	Safe
3	H & Holly	8.5	8.5	8.5	8.0	33.5	2nd	Acro-floor	"Can You Feel It" — The Jacksons	Safe
4	Bobby & Kristin	9.0	9.0	9.0	9.0	36.0	1st	Acro-floor	"Let It Go" — Idina Menzel	Safe
5	Lucy & Billy	7.5	7.5	7.0	6.5	28.5	6th	Acro-floor	"The Shoop Shoop Song (It's in His Kiss)" — Cher	Safe
6	Amelle & Doug	7.5	8.0	8.5	8.5	32.5	4th	Acro-floor	"Bang Bang" — Jessie J	Safe
7	Carl & Sita	8.0	8.0	8.5	8.5	33.0	3rd	Acro-floor	"Up Where We Belong" — Joe Cocker & Jennifer Warnes	Bottom two

=== Week 6: Final (13 September) ===
Order	Couple	Judges' scores				Total	Scoreboard	Discipline	Song	Result
Order	Couple	Stella	Smith	Comăneci	Heap	Total	Scoreboard	Discipline	Song	Result
1	Lucy & Billy	8.0	9.0	9.0	9.0	35.0	5th	Trapeze	"Born This Way" — Lady Gaga	Eliminated
2	Bobby & Kristin	8.0	8.5	8.5	8.5	33.5	6th	Trapeze	"It's a Beautiful Day" — Michael Bublé	Winner
3	Amelle & Doug	9.0	9.0	8.5	9.0	35.5	4th	Trapeze	"Stay with Me" — Lorraine Ellison	Eliminated
4	H & Holly	10.0	10.0	10.0	10.0	40.0	1st	Trapeze	"Holding Out for a Hero" — Bonnie Tyler	Runners-up
5	Sarah & Leon	9.5	9.5	9.5	9.5	38.0	=2nd	Trapeze	"Beneath Your Beautiful" — Labrinth feat. Emeli Sandé	Runners-up
6	Carl & Sita	9.5	9.5	9.5	9.5	38.0	=2nd	Trapeze	"Timber" — Pitbull feat. Kesha	Eliminated

== Ratings ==
All ratings are taken from BARB.

Episode no.	Airdate	Total viewers (millions)	Weekly ranking BBC One
1	9 August 2014	3.44	28
2	16 August 2014	3.54	28
3	23 August 2014	N/A	Outside Top 30
4	30 August 2014	N/A	Outside Top 30
5	6 September 2014	N/A	Outside Top 30
6	13 September 2014	N/A	Outside Top 30

== See also ==
- Strictly Come Dancing, which follows a similar format but for dancing instead of gymnastics
- Dancing on Ice, which follows a similar format but for ice skating instead of gymnastics
- Just the Two of Us, which follows a similar format but for singing instead of gymnastics
- Splash!, which follows a similar format but for diving instead of gymnastics
- The Jump, which follows a similar format but for winter sports instead of gymnastics
