= Biondini =

Biondini is a surname. Notable people with the name include:

- Signora Biondini (1833–1898), Swedish opera singer and singing instructor
- Davide Biondini (born 1983), Italian former professional footballer
- Luciano Biondini (born 1971), Italian jazz and folk music accordion player
- Tonio Biondini (1945 – 1983), Italian cross-country skier
- Silvia Biondini (born 1976), retired Italian triple and long jumper
- Eros Biondini (born 1971), veterinarian, Roman Catholic singer, presenter and Brazilian politician.

== See also ==
- Biondi
