= Elliott Wright =

British reality television personality

Elliott Wright is a British reality television personality.

He appeared in The Only Way is Essex between 2010 and 2017. He was the main cast member in the six part series Playa in Marbella and Get Your Act Together, where he was trained by Billy George. He is the cousin of Mark, Josh and Jess Wright.

In 2016, he became engaged to Sadie Stuart, whom he is now married to. He lives in Bromley, Chislehurst, England.
