= Arturo Brachetti =

Italian magician

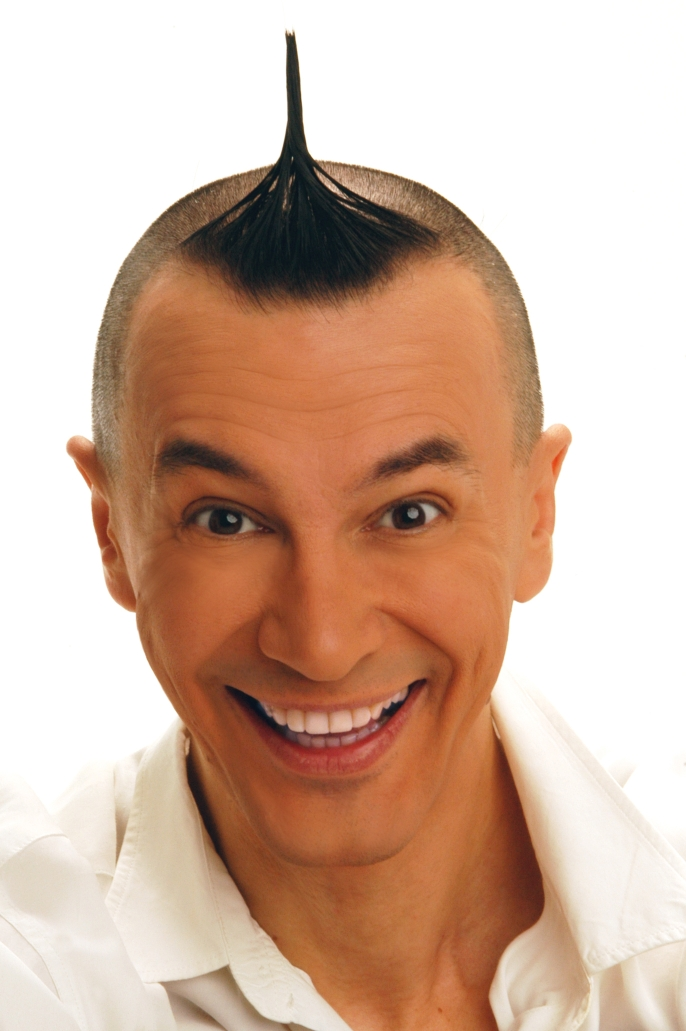
- Arturo Brachetti
- Born: 13 October 1957 (age 68); Turin, Italy
- Occupations: Magician, illusionist
- Website: www.brachetti.com

Arturo Brachetti (Italian pronunciation: [arˈtuːro braˈketti]; born 13 October 1957) is an Italian quick-change artist considered the best quick change performer in the world. In the Guinness Book of Records, he is described as the quickest and most prolific quick-change artist in the world.

== Early life ==
Brachetti was born in Turin. His career covers a wide artistic range and has made him an international name. The change from one costume to another is performed in a matter of seconds, often by throwing a sheet up and completely changing the costume by the time it falls. In the current show, Brachetti performs 80 characters in one evening. His skills also include shadowgraphy and sand painting.

As a child, he frequented a seminary, where he met a young priest, Silvio Mantelli, with the hobby of magic. Spending most of his time in the magical warehouse of the priest, Brachetti learnt all kinds of magic tricks. At the age of 15, using costumes borrowed from the seminary's theatre, he invented and performed his first quick-change act, an art introduced to the world by Leopoldo Fregoli (1867–1936).

== Career ==
His professional career began in 1978 in France at the Parisian cabaret Paradis Latin, under the direction of Jean Marie Rivière. This led to a starring role in André Heller's German production of "Flic Flac"(1981). From Germany he went to England, appearing at London's Piccadilly Theatre starring in the production of "Y" which ran for just over a year (1983–84). He was nominated for the prestigious Society of West End Theatre Award. That same year he performed at "The Covent Garden Christmas Gala" in the presence of the British royal family.

On his return to Italy, he participated as the guest star in 10 episodes of the television show Al paradise for the Italian national television RAI (1985). It was after this that he was introduced to the Italian theatre scene. This led to a string of successful theatre productions (M. Butterfly, L'Histoire du Soldat, Varietà, In Principio Arturo, Amami Arturo, Il Mistero dei Bastardi Assassini, I Massibilli, etc.), and television appearances, making him one of the most critically acclaimed young actors of the Italian stage. He also memorably performed as the interval act at the 1991 Eurovision Song Contest in Rome.

He returned to London to perform in Tony Harrison's production of "Square Rounds" at the National Theatre. In 1989 and 1990 he was also a regular performer on The Best of Magic for Thames Television. Then off to Disneyland Paris where, with Mickey Mouse, he co-hosted the show A Night of Magic, which was transmitted internationally.

From 1995, with the Italian production company Compagnia Della Rancia and the director Saverio Marconi, Brachetti continued to concentrate on creating and developing musicals for the Italian audience. His original musical "Fregoli" won the Biglietto D'Oro (Golden Ticket Award) for the best-selling show in a season (280,000 tickets). His popularity continued with the production of "Brachetti in Technicolor" and "Midsummer Night's Dream".

In the opera field, he played the storyteller in Stravinsky's "Histoire du soldat", "Peter and the wolf"(2011) and "Allegro un po' troppo" (2013).

His appearance on a live episode of The Drew Carey Show in 1999 gave him a "pick of the day" title on the program Access Hollywood. He also played a role in the Warner sitcom Nikki.

In 1999 he presented his new show in Montreal, produced by the Just for laughs festival. His one-man show "The Man With a Thousand Faces" featured more than 80 transformations. The show won the Moliere Award in Paris and then the Canadian Olivier Award the same year. After 700 sold-out performances in Paris, the show went on tour in French-speaking countries, Germany and several cities in the USA. In 2003 Jeffery Deaver named Brachetti in his bestseller The Vanished Man. In Christmas 2004, he was invited to perform in the Élysée Palace in Paris in the presence of President Chirac.

In 2006, Brachetti's show reached the proportion of a big musical production with over 1000 performances completed and over 1.5 million tickets sold.

Brachetti directed several shows from 1994 onwards. In Germany: "Fantasissimo" and "1000 Nachte" at the Wintergarten Theatre in Berlin; in Italy: "I Corti", "Tel chi el Telun", "Meta fisico metà fa schifo" and the tour of singer Angelo Branduardi. In 2006 he directed the show Anplagghed with the Italian comedians Aldo, Giovanni and Giacomo. A film version of the show came out in cinemas in Italy in November 2006. In 2012 the last show by Aldo, Giovanni & Giacomo "Ammutta Muddica".

In 2008 he created and toured the show "Gran Varietà Brachetti" a big production involving 25 artists and celebrating the world of Music Hall.

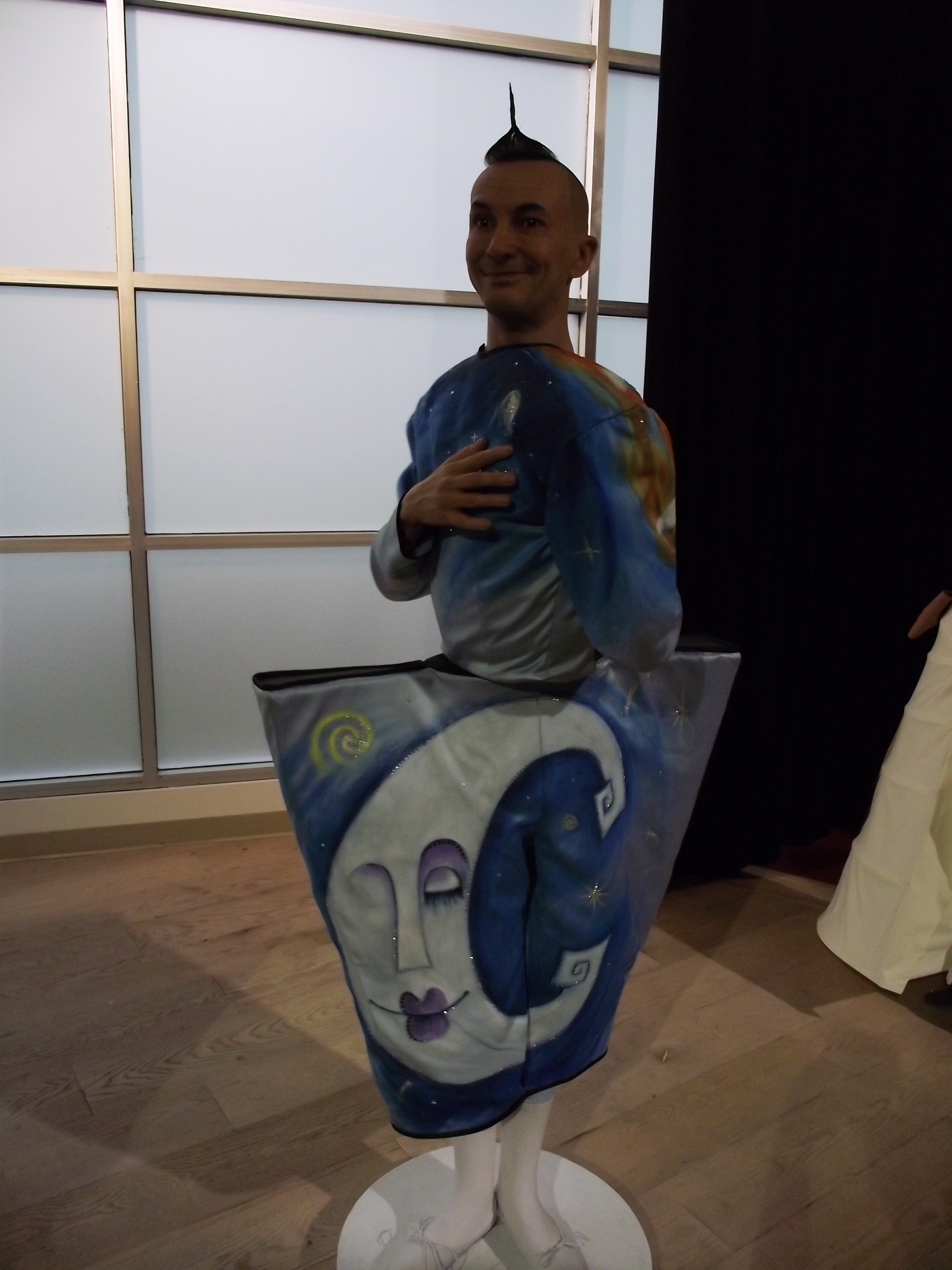
Arturo Brachetti at Musée Grévin Montreal

On 26 October 2009, Just for Laughs presented Brachetti in a new production by Sean Foley titled 'Change' at London's Garrick Theatre due to run through until 3 January 2010. For this show, he was nominated for the 2010 "Laurence Olivier Award".

In 2008 he presented the One Man Show directed by Serge Denoncourt dedicated to the world of Cinema, playing more than 80 characters.

In 2006 he received the diploma Honoris Causa from the Accademia Belle Arti. In December 2011 he received the title of Chevalier des Arts et des Lettres from the French Ministry of Culture Frédéric Mitterrand. In Italy he received the title of Commander in June 2014.

In 2013 and 2014 he was a judge in the French TV show The Best broadcast by TF1.

An animated statue of Brachetti, changing costumes every 20 seconds, is displayed at Musée Grevin, the wax museum of Paris, Prague, Montreux and Montreal.

Preceded by Yugoslav Changes	Eurovision Song Contest; Final Interval act 1991	Succeeded by A Century of Dance
