= Quick-change (performance) =

Rapid costume change as part of a performance

Quick-change is a performance style where a performer (often, a magician) changes quickly, usually within seconds, from one costume into another.

== Notable quick-change artists ==
=== 19th century ===
==== Leopoldo Fregoli ====
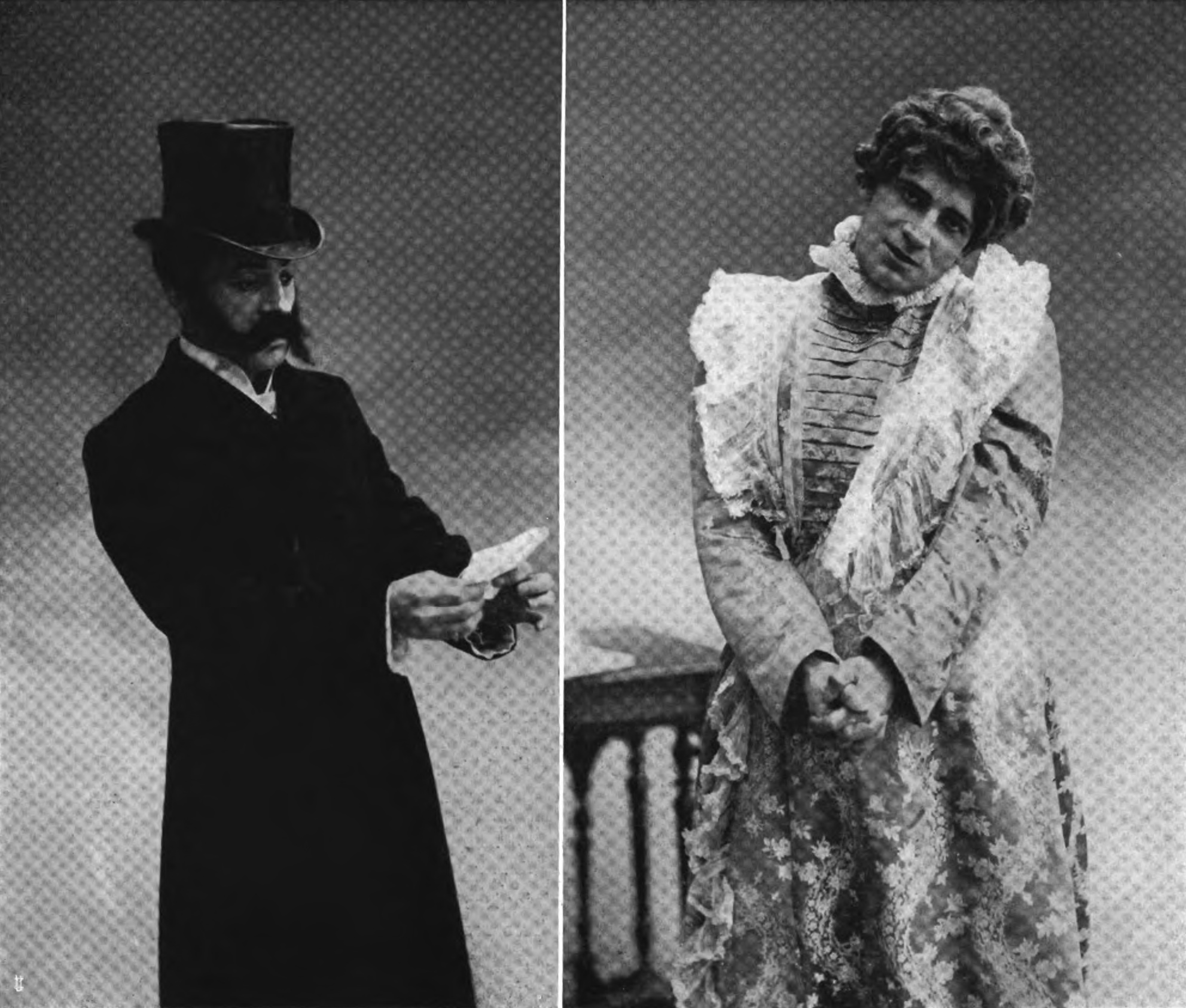
Two of Fregoli's characters from his show Camaleonte ("Chameleon")

Leopoldo Fregoli (1867–1936) was a quick change performer from the late 19th century. One contemporary review praised the "lightning speed" of his work and called him "the most striking of the Protean men, past, present and future". Fregoli was praised for his vocal range and mastery of European languages.

Fregoli made costume and hairpiece changes just out of view of the audience, in a few seconds. He continued speaking to the audience during these changes. He was reported as owning a collection of 800 costumes and 1200 wigs.

==== Castor Watt ====
Castor Watt (1858–1932) was an internationally known quick-change artist from Germany. His special feature was his performance without any aids. The spectacular "quick change" of his costumes happened on an open stage, right in front of the audience. The US debut of his "character changes" act was at Hammerstein's Olympia in 1896.

=== 20th and 21st centuries ===
==== Lee Alex ====
Lee Alex is a British born illusionist based in Istanbul, Turkey. He is winner of the Merlin Award "Illusionist of the Year 2009" presented by the International Magicians' Society. Known throughout the magic world for his "Colour Change Waistcoat", "Snow Leopard Vest" and "Happy Birthday Waistcoat". Lee Alex is the co-author and translator of the German book Quick Change by Lex Schoppi and the sole author of the book Time for a Change?.

==== Arturo Brachetti ====
When Italian actor and performer Arturo Brachetti started his career in Paradis Latin, Paris (1979) he was the only quick-change performer in the world since Leopoldo Fregoli. Guinness World Records lists him as the fastest and most prolific in the world. His last one-man show has been seen by more than two million people worldwide. The changing of his tailcoat from black to white live and close to public was a method invented by him and is considered his artistic signature. His wardrobe consists of more than 350 costumes but evolves show by show. His performances often involve a series of characters, played consecutively one after the other, or in spoken sketches in which he plays all the roles interacting with each other.

In 2000, he was awarded the Molière Award, the highest accolade in French theatre, for "The Man with 1000 Faces", where he performs 80 different characters in a two-hour show. The show sold out in Paris for several months in Theatre Marigny, Theatre Mogador, Casino de Paris, from April 2000 to January 2005. Brachetti has created and performed about 25 acts for television and 10 plays, produced by the National Theatre of Italy. The festival "Juste Pour Rire" (the yearly "Just for Laughs" comedy festival every July in Montreal) launched his career in North America. In the Opera field, he created a personal version of L'Histoire du soldat by Stravinsky, "Peter and the Wolf" by Prokofiev and "Allegro, un po' troppo" with the Symphonic Orchestra of Rai Radio Televisione Italiana. In 2009, he was nominated for the Laurence Olivier Award in London for the show "Change" at the Garrick Theatre. He returned to Paris in 2009 at the Folies Bergere with his new show about Cinema. In 2011, the French Ministry of Culture presented him with the honorary title of Chevalier des Arts et des Lettres Knight of Arts and Letters. In 2003, Jeffery Deaver named Brachetti in his bestseller The Vanished Man. In 2013 and 2014, he was a judge in the French TV show The Best broadcast by TF1. An animated statue of Brachetti, changing costumes every 20 seconds, is displayed at Musée Grevin, the wax museum of Paris and Montreal. In September 2013, the French newspaper Le Monde dedicated him an interview in the first page. In 2014, Italy he received the title of Commander in June 2014 by Italian President Giorgio Napolitano. On September 2, 2019, Arturo Brachetti was awarded The David Devant Award for Services to International Magic by The Magic Circle, presented to Arturo at their annual awards ceremony held at their Headquarters in Central London. In February 2020, Arturo headlined at the Blackpool Magic Convention with a performance of his show Solo at the Winter Gardens Opera House.

==== Solange Kardinaly ====
Solange Kardinaly is a Portuguese quick-change performer and magician who, with her partner Arkadio, holds the Guinness world record for most costume changes in a single minute, with 25. On season 19 of America's Got Talent, she received unanimous acclaim from the judges for a performance to Madonna's "Material Girl" which went viral. She also appeared on three other Got Talent series (Czechia & Slovakia, Ellada Eheis Talento, and Romania) as well as Penn & Teller: Fool Us.

==== Léa Kyle ====
Léa Kyle is a French quick-change performer. She appeared on the seventh season of Penn & Teller: Fool Us in which she fooled judges Penn & Teller. Kyle received a golden buzzer from Heidi Klum on season 16 of America's Got Talent.

==== Keelan Leyser and Charlotte Marie ====
A real-life couple who own an on-line magic shop, Keelan Leyser and Charlotte Marie also perform a magic specialty act that is primarily a mix of dance and quick-change. They have performed in over 45 countries. In an appearance on Penn & Teller: Fool Us, they performed 9 changes between them in a period of four minutes, with the majority of time spent dancing to various musical bits related to each costume change. Leyser has a background in magic, while Marie has a background in dance. In 2015, Leyser trained up Matthew Wolfenden and Natalie Anderson from the TV show Emmerdale to perform his act with him and his new dance partner Shereen on the ITV show called Get Your Act Together which was presented by Stephen Mulhurn. Leyser is known to now incorporate technology themed magic into his show.

==== Luca Lombardo ====
Luca Lombardo is an Italian magician, actor and quick change artist. Deep admirer of Arturo Brachetti, he is the author of the play "Poubelle" which is based entirely on changes of clothes. He is also the author of the book "Confessions of a Quick Change Artist".

==== David and Dania ====
David and Dania were a quick change duo that achieved fame on the first season of America's Got Talent, making it to the Finals. David Maas and Dania Kaseeva married in 1996. The act was most well-known to basketball enthusiasts where they performed in all 30 NBA venues, the All-Star Game, and 15 W.N.B.A. arenas. At least 76 institutions hosted them for halftime performances; they also performed at Big Ten basketball tournaments and at the N.C.A.A. Final Four. David Maas died from COVID-19 on November 22, 2020.

==== Sos and Victoria Petrosyan ====
German - Armenian/Russian duo Sos and Victoria Petrosyan "The New Generation of Quick-Change Artists" are four times Guinness World Records holders in High Speed Costume Change Illusion: 2007 - 16 costumes in 2 minutes in Germany. 2008 - 11 costumes in 1 minute in China. 2008 - 12 costumes in 1 minute in Italy and in 2011 they have done another Guinness World Record - 13 costumes in 1 minute.

They began in 1991 in Moscow. Magic Circle of Germany decided to present Sos & Victoria as the Best Magic Act in 2007. Duo Petrosyan Awarded - The Best Magician of the Year and International World Merlin Award in USA for the fastest quick change act in the world. They are the only magicians in the world who have gained this Oscar twice. In Los Angeles they got a World Magic Award for the Best Cabaret Duo 2008.

In 2010, Sos and Victoria Petrosyan gained a Guinness World Records on the French TV Show "Le Plus Grand Cabaret du Monde" in Paris - 19 costumes. Sos is a trick producer and author of magic books and articles about the art of quick change. Sos and Victoria have been awarded by the Magic Circle in Germany the "Best Writer of the Year 2010" for the books: "Women's Dress Transformation" Part 2 and "Men's Suit Transformation" Part 1. All the tricks and transformation costumes used in their performances have been developed by Sos.

In 2011, they got to the semi-final of the German TV Show "Das Supertalents". In 2012 they performed in Beijing "China International "Great Wall" Magic Carnival" where 20 magicians, FISM winners, presented their dazzling performances in a theater for thousands of people, in a magical battle for three days. Sos & Victoria Petrosyan received the only one Gold Medal for Stage Competition. There was also 2 Silver and 3 Bronze Medals.

==== Lex Schoppi and Alina ====
Lex Schoppi is a trick producer and author of magic books and articles about the art of quick change. He has been Author of the Year for his quick change books and several times Artist of the Year in Germany. His stage partner Alina is a Latin dancer. They work with long dresses and overcoats. Alina is the only woman in the world to master the split second costume change whilst still bound (the world fastest escape illusion).

They appeared in the Eurovision Magic Circus Show with three winners from Heidi Klum's "Germanys Topmodels". He has an own tailor workshop for his magic and works for artists and stars. He created the opening ceremony of German Music Award Echo.

==== Soul Mystique ====
Soul Mystique is an Australian duo of entertainers who became known in world variety theater for their performances combining professional dancesport with a high speed quick change act. This duo is most famous for their two times appearance on the television show Australia's Got Talent in 2007 (series 1) and 2012 (series 6) – both times with great success as Grand Finalists, and placing 2nd runner up in series 6.

In 2008, Soul Mystique was placed among 10 of the world's best magicians by Fox Bio Channel – and was invited by Las Vegas veterans and legends of Magic, Siegfried and Roy, as the closing act for the historic event 'A Tribute to Siegfried & Roy at The London Palladium', where Queen Elizabeth and members of the Royal Family were in attendance.

In 2011, Soul Mystique was listed as the choice of entertainment for high society by Asia Tatler magazine. This duo was also two times 'Australian Entertainer of the Year' Finalist in 2011 and 2012 by Australian Event Awards. Soul Mystique is a partnership formed in 1996, between two former Latin-American dancesport champions, Gavin Skinner and Lydia Lim. This duo produces every aspect of their shows from costuming, props, to music arrangements. Soul Mystique is a registered trademark since 2009.

==== Vizage ====
Vizage appeared in the 2008 semifinals of Britain's Got Talent where they performed a quick-change act with singing. They did, however, get three buzzers.

== See also ==
- Bian lian (a similar performance type in traditional China)
- Chapeaugraphy
