= News Xchange =

Annual conference for the international broadcast news industry

News Xchange logo

News Xchange is an annual conference for the international broadcast news industry. The event is run on a not-for-profit basis and is underwritten by Eurovision, which runs the global Eurovision network as the operations department of the European Broadcasting Union. Each year the event lasts for two days and is sponsored by a range of organizations involved in news broadcasting around the world.

== News Xchange locations ==
The first News Xchange conference took place in 2002 in Ljubljana, Slovenia. Since then the event has been held in different locations each year:

- News Xchange 2002, Ljubljana, Slovenia
- News Xchange 2003, Budapest, Hungary
- News Xchange 2004, Vilamoura, Portugal
- News Xchange 2005, Amsterdam, Netherlands
- News Xchange 2006, Istanbul, Turkey
- News Xchange 2007, Berlin, Germany
- News Xchange 2008, Valencia, Spain
- News Xchange 2009, Valletta, Malta
- News Xchange 2010, Athens, Greece
- News Xchange 2011, Cascais, Portugal
- News Xchange 2012, Barcelona, Spain
- News Xchange 2013, Marrakesh, Morocco
- News Xchange 2014, Prague, Czech Republic
- News Xchange 2015, Berlin, Germany
- News Xchange 2016, Copenhagen, Denmark
- News Xchange 2017, Amsterdam, Netherlands
- News Xchange 2018, Edinburgh, United Kingdom
- News Xchange 2019, Paris, France

== News Xchange purpose ==
The main purpose of the event is the discussion of issues currently affecting broadcast journalists and editors around the world. News Xchange attracts contributions from prominent figures from the broadcast news industry as well as politicians, opinion formers and other important individuals.

== Distinction from News Exchanges ==
The News Xchange conference (which has no 'E' at the start of Xchange) is distinct from Eurovision News Exchanges (with an 'E'); though the two are sometimes confused. Daily News Exchanges are organized by Eurovision on behalf of members of the European Broadcasting Union. News Xchange conference has no direct connection with these Exchanges and is open to all organizations and individuals involved in broadcast news.
