= International Fellowship of Christian Magicians =

The International Fellowship of Christian Magicians was formed in 1953 by a group of individuals interested in sharing the Gospel using sleight of hand illusions, juggling, puppetry, ventriloquism, comedy, clowning, mime, facepainting, storytelling and related performance-arts disciplines. Since its beginnings in California it has grown into an international organization with thousands of members past and present. These members are not only performers of Gospel magic, but also entertainers across the world, secular and gospel, that are members of the Christian faith. Notable members have included ministers and entertainers like: Andre Kole, Duane Laflin, Matt Adams, Bryan Drake, Jared Hall, Brock Gill, Justin Flom, Kenrick "ICE" McDonald, Lance Burton, Don Bursell, David Ginn, Wes Iseli and others.

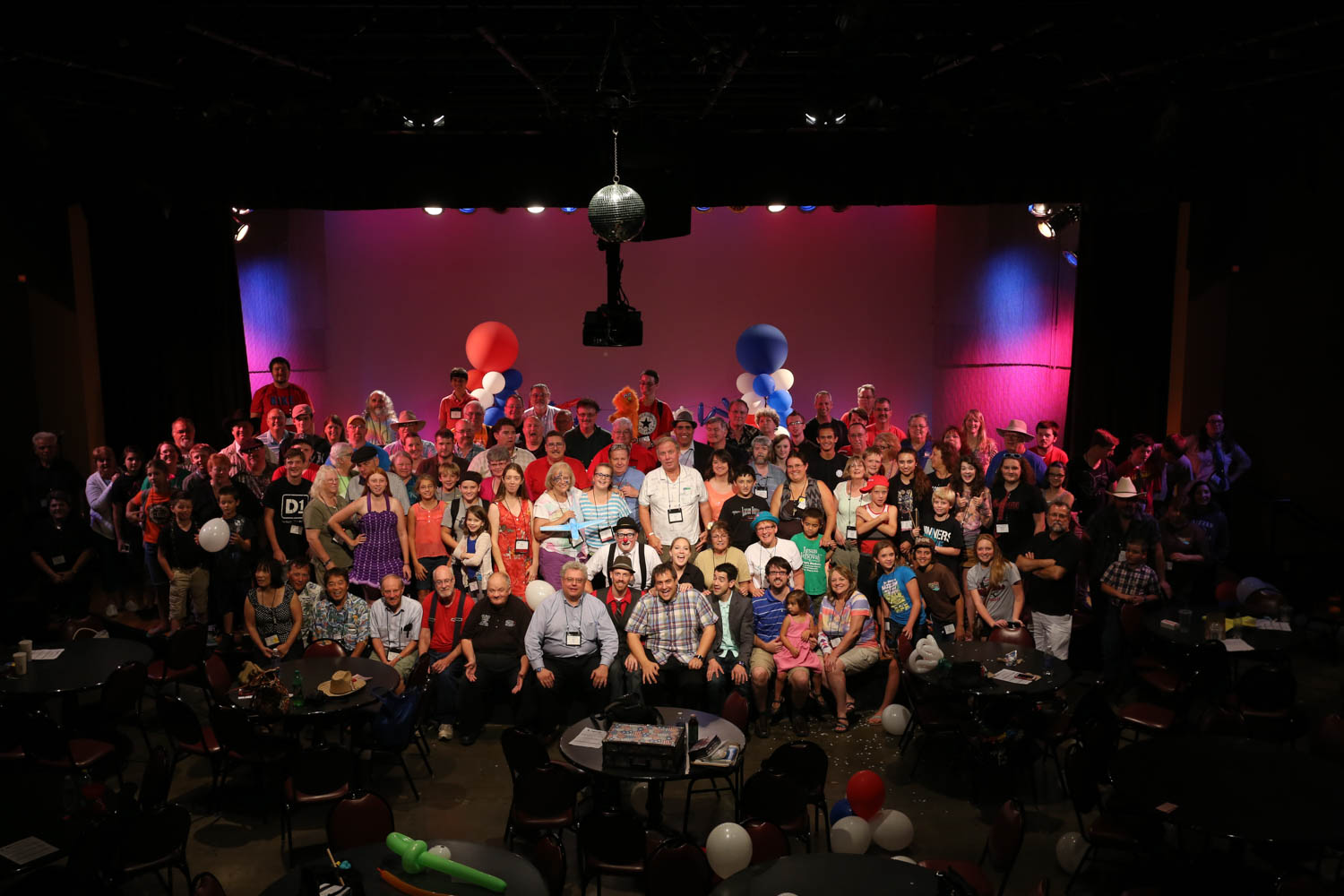
Photos from International Conference in Nashville, TN

Many of its members are involved in ministries that not only share the Gospel and entertain through the use of illusions but also by using puppetry, ventriloquism, clowning, balloon sculpturing, drama, storytelling, chalk art, face art, juggling and other visual arts; as a result they include all these art forms at our training conventions, regional conferences and in their magazine, The Voice.

The International Fellowship of Christian Magicians has an annual convention that moves across the country, but is currently held in the Indianapolis, Indiana area. Their website is found at www.FCM.org.

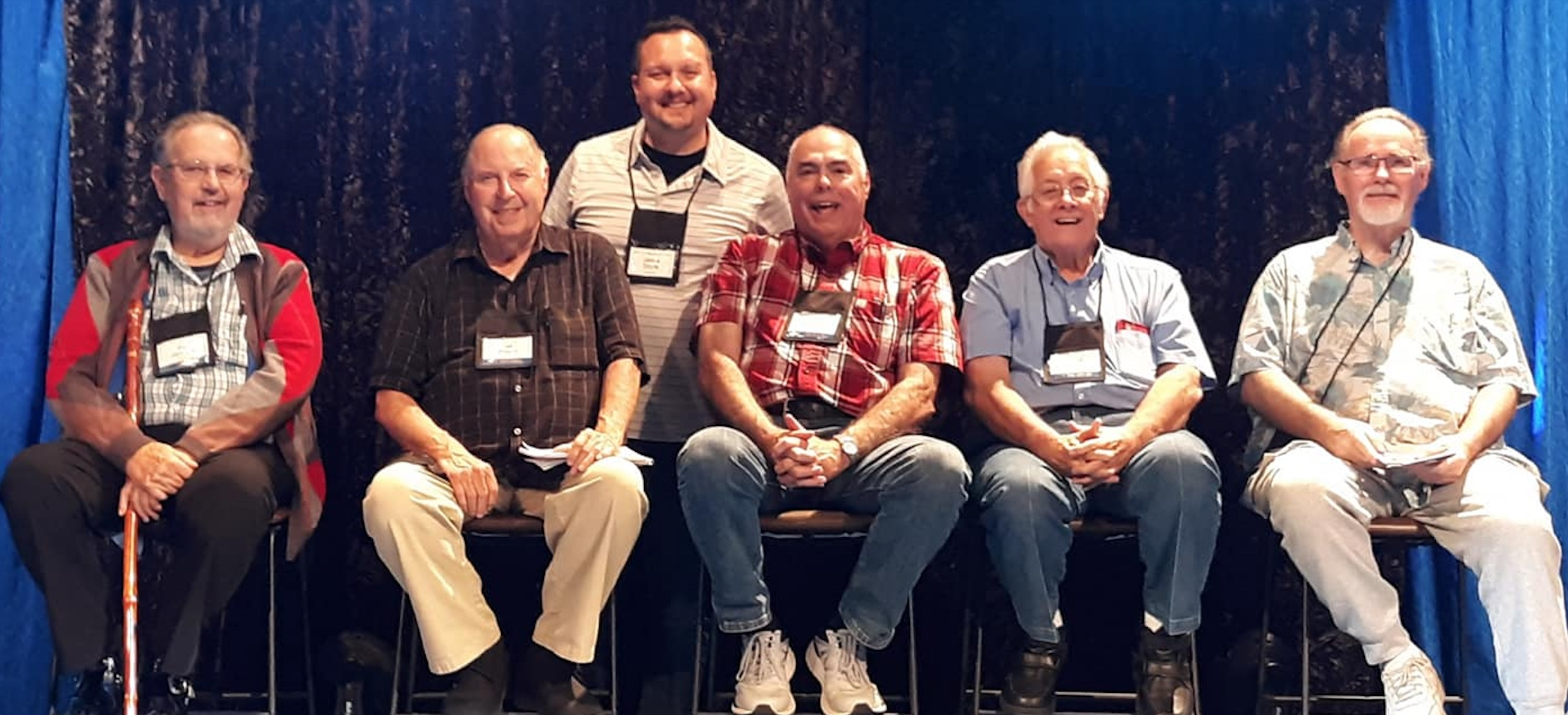
Top: Current President, Jamie Doyle. Left to right: Past Living Presidents, Edward Jarvis, Del Wilson, Jerry Burgess, Steve Varro, Len Camp (Not pictured: Duane Laflin, Joey Evans)

== Leadership ==
The current President of the organization is Rev. Jamie Doyle.

- 1st Vice President: P.J. Weber
- 2nd Vice President: Rev. Greg Phillips
- Treasurer: Andrew Anderson
- Secretary: Beth Salo
- Immediate Past President: Joey Evans

Past Living Presidents

- Joey Evans Former President
- Steve Varro Former President
- Duane Laflin Former President
- Del Wilson Former President
- Len Camp Former President
- Ed Jarvis Former President
- Jerry Burgess Former President

All Past Presidents

1. Rev. James Wilson Knorr November 1953 - July 1954
2. Rev. William Widenham July 1954 - September 1954
3. Stan Adair September 1954 - June 1959
4. Bill Oberb June 1959 - March 1962
5. Jimmy Lake March 1962 - December 1969
6. Rev. Bill Baker January 1970 - December 1971
7. Rev. John deVries January 1972 - December 1974
8. Ralph Mills January 1975 - December 1979
9. Rev. Len Camp January 1980 - December 1983
10. Dr. Jerry Burgess January 1984 - December 1987
11. Rev. Eddie Davis January 1988 - December 1989
12. Dr. Jerry Burgess January 1990 - December 1991
13. Rev. Duane Laflin January 1992 - December 1995
14. Rev. Bill Baker January 1996 - December 1999
15. Steve Varro January 2000 - December 2003
16. Dr. Edward Jarvis January 2004 - December 2005
17. Del Wilson January 2006 - July 2014
18. Steve Varro August 2014 - July 2017
19. Joey Evans July 2017 - July 2020
20. Duane Laflin August 2020 - March 2021

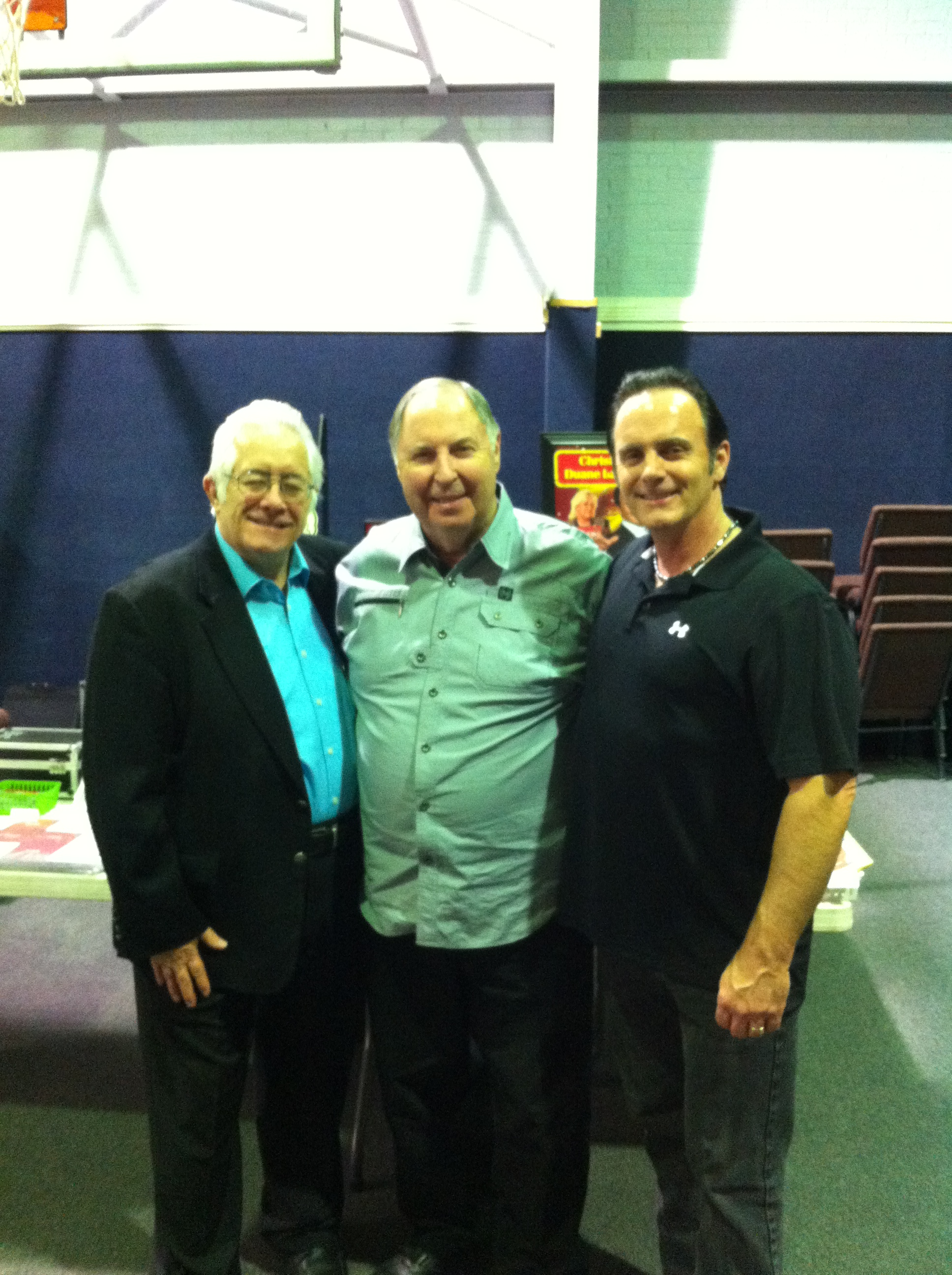
Steve Varro, Del Wilson and Duane Laflin at a magic symposium in Tyler, Texas(US).
