= Andrea McLean =

Scottish journalist and television presenter (born 1969)

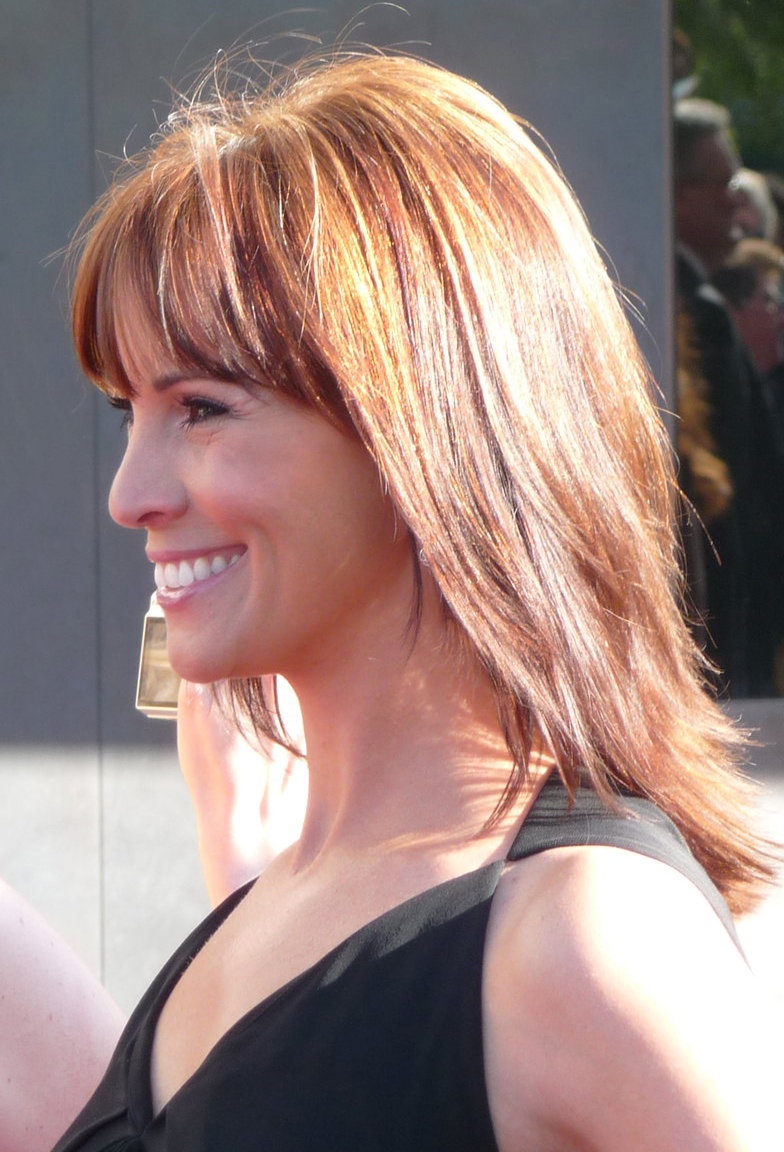
- McLean in 2009
- Born: 5 October 1969 (age 57); Glasgow, Scotland
- Education: Coventry University
- Occupations: Journalist, television presenter
- Spouses: Nick Green (m. 2000; div. 2005); Steve Toms (m. 2009; div. 2012); Nick Feeney (m. 2017)
- Children: 2 Biological & 2 stepchildren

Andrea Jean McLean (born 5 October 1969) is a Scottish journalist and television presenter, best known for her work on ITV Daytime.

She served a weather presenter for GMTV from 1997 to 2008, and as a co-presenter on ITV's daytime chat show Loose Women from 2007 to 2020.

== Early life ==
Although born in Glasgow, McLean and her sister were raised in Trinidad and Tobago. The family then moved back to Scotland when she was 15, living in the small village of Tarbolton for some time, briefly attending Tarbolton Primary School, before later settling in Market Harborough, Leicestershire, England. She took her school exams at Robert Smyth grammar school.

McLean is of Russian Jewish descent on her father's side who fled from Russia to Scotland to avoid persecution. McLean has stated she has always known about her Jewish heritage but her family are not religiously Jewish anymore.

McLean studied for her BA Hons in Modern Studies at Coventry University, and later gained a Postgraduate Certificate in Periodical Journalism. She then took a gap year in Cairns, Australia.

== Career ==
McLean started her career in 1993 as a freelance travel writer. She joined Central Press Features in May 1994 and was promoted to Production Editor in 1995. In June 1996, McLean joined The Weather Channel, and worked as a weather reporter for Talk Radio UK. In 1997, she worked on Channel 5's daily talk show Espresso as one of the programme's panellists.

In June 1997, McLean joined GMTV as a weather presenter. She co-hosted GMTV Today with Ben Shephard and Eamonn Holmes, and hosted LK Today in Lorraine Kelly's absence. Her bubbly personality and journalistic training brought her to the attention of various producers, resulting in her presenting shows such as the first series of Our House for UKTV Style, and as a guest panellist on Loose Women for ITV. After announcing her decision to leave in November 2008, McLean was replaced as GMTV weather presenter by the BBC's Kirsty McCabe. McLean presented her final broadcast on 31 December 2008, with a special tribute of her career at GMTV.

In January 2006, McLean took part in ITV's ice-skating competition Dancing on Ice. She partnered with professional skater Doug Webster and was eliminated in the third week. McLean and fellow ex-contestant Andi Peters then presented the weekday fan show Dancing on Ice Extra for the remainder of the show's run.

McLean filled in for Jackie Brambles on Loose Women when Brambles went on maternity leave. In July 2008, it was announced that McLean would quit working on GMTV to focus on her role on Loose Women, to share the permanent host job with Brambles. Brambles left the show on 7 August 2009, Kate Thornton took her place as the new anchor when the show returned for its 10th anniversary on 1 September 2009 and shared the job with McLean. In 2011, Thornton was replaced by Carol Vorderman. In 2013, Kaye Adams became an anchor and Ruth Langsford returned to the programme in January 2014. In July 2014, Vorderman announced her departure from Loose Women. McLean continued to co-anchor Loose Women 2 or 3 days a week. Langsford and Christine Lampard are the other anchors. On 30 November 2020, McLean announced she was to leave the show after 13 years to pursue other endeavours. She departed the show on 16 December 2020.

In August 2010, McLean appeared as one of the panellists on ITV's afternoon debate show 3@Three. In 2011, McLean played the role of Dr. Audrey Grey in the British drama film A Landscape of Lies.

In August 2014, McLean took part in the BBC One gymnastics series Tumble partnered with professional gymnast Alex Uttley and on 16 August, she was the first celebrity to be eliminated.

In June 2018, McLean launched her own website, This Girl Is On Fire with husband Nick Feeney. Born out of the response of her best-selling book, Confessions of a Menopausal Woman, McLean decided to create an online community for women not only going through the menopause, but also wanting to 'relight their fire'. In June 2019, McLean and Feeney celebrated the site's first birthday with a party attended by website contributors and special guests such as Amanda Lamb, Jo Malone and Brenda Edwards. The event was covered by Hello! magazine.

In June 2021, McLean, alongside husband Nick Feeney, became a certified life coach.

== Personal life ==
McLean had a 17-year relationship, starting from their teenage years, with BBC producer Nick Green. The couple married in Kenya in 2000, and have a son, Finlay, born in October 2001. In 2004, it came to light that McLean had an affair with fellow Our House presenter Steve Toms, but had returned to her husband to try to resolve issues.

After divorcing Green, McLean and Toms moved in together, and lived in Ashtead, Surrey; they had a daughter, Amy, in November 2006. The couple married in August 2009, during Loose Women's summer break.

In January 2012, McLean announced that she had separated from Toms, having left their marital home in December 2011 with their children, following working on their failing marriage for a year, and was now living with her parents.

In January 2016, McLean announced that she was living with her new partner of two years, Nick Feeney, a businessman, whom she met on a blind date set up by Donna May Clitheroe, a Loose Women make-up artist. On 3 August 2017, Andrea announced on Loose women that Nick had proposed in Paris the week before and they were engaged. They married in November 2017.

On Loose Women on 21 September 2016, McLean stated she would be undergoing a hysterectomy on 22 September 2016 and that she would be away from the show for a number of weeks whilst she recovered. This sent her into the menopause causing her to experience symptoms on air.

=== Charity ===
On 11 December 2013, McLean did a reverse bungee jump live on Loose Women for Text Santa. She was catapulted 37m into the sky at over 50 mph outside The London Studios, after Loose Women reached its Text Santa fundraising target of £50,000.

== Filmography ==
Television

| Year | Title | Role | Channel |
|---|---|---|---|
| 1997 | Espresso | Panellist | Channel 5 |
| 1997–2008 | GMTV | Weather presenter | ITV |
| 1997–2008 | Our House | Presenter | UKTV Style (now Home) |
| 1997–2008 | LK Today | Presenter | ITV |
| 2006 | Dancing on Ice | Contestant | ITV |
| 2006 | Dancing on Ice Extra | Co-presenter | ITV |
| 2007–2020 | Loose Women | Anchor | ITV |
| 2010 | 3@Three | Panellist | ITV |
| 2014 | Tumble | Contestant | BBC One |
| 2019 | Celebrity SAS: Who Dares Wins | Contestant | Channel 4 |

Guest appearances

- Bullseye (2006)
- Daily Cooks Challenge (2008)
- Who Wants to Be a Millionaire? (2009)
- The Justin Lee Collins Show (2009)
- Never Mind the Buzzcocks (2009)
- All Star Family Fortunes (2009, 2013)
- Total Wipeout (2010)
- The Alan Titchmarsh Show (2011, 2013)
- The Chase: Celebrity Special (2013, 2015)
- Celebrity Fifteen to One (2014)
- Catchphrase: Celebrity Special (2015)
- All Star Mr & Mrs (2016)
- Through the Keyhole (2017)
- Celebrity Juice (2017)
- Sunday Brunch (2017)
- The Crystal Maze: Celebrity Special (2017)
- Tipping Point: Lucky Stars (2017)
- Big Star's Bigger Star (2018)
- Richard Osman's House of Games (2020)

Film

| Year | Title | Role | Notes |
|---|---|---|---|
| 2011 | A Landscape of Lies | Dr. Audrey Grey | |
