= Josefa Biondi =

Argentine politician

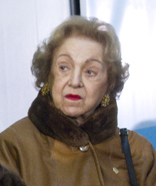
- Biondi in 2012

Member of the Chamber of Deputies
- In office 1952–1955
- Constituency: Santa Fe

Personal details
- Born: 1916 Rosario, Argentina
- Died: 4 January 2019 (aged 102–103)

Josefa Biondi (1916 – 4 January 2019) was an Argentine politician. She was elected to the Chamber of Deputies in 1951 as one of the first group of female parliamentarians in Argentina.

== Biography ==
Biondi was born in Rosario in 1916.

In the 1951 legislative elections she was a Peronist Party candidate in Santa Fe and was one of the 26 women elected to the Chamber of Deputies. She remained in office until 1955. She was arrested during the Revolución Libertadora and later went into exile in Montevideo.

She died in January 2019.
