= Get Your Act Together =

- Genre: Reality television
- Presented by: Stephen Mulhern
- Starring: Series cast
- Country of origin: United Kingdom
- Original language: English
- No. of series: 1
- No. of episodes: 6

Production
- Production locations: The London Studios; Fountain Studios (final)
- Running time: 75 minutes (inc. adverts)
- Production company: ITV Studios

Original release
- Network: ITV
- Release: 18 January – 22 February 2015

Get Your Act Together is a British talent show that began airing on ITV on 18 January 2015, hosted by Stephen Mulhern. The show features celebrities learning various different acts, such as juggling, singing, impressions and escapology, and performing them on a live stage.

== Production ==
Get Your Act Together was produced by ITV Studios for ITV, and that aired for 6 weeks from 18 January 2015 until 22 February 2015. The show was presented by Stephen Mulhern and was filmed at The London Studios during the heat rounds and at Fountain Studios during the final.

== Contestants ==
The 26 celebrity contestants were revealed in December 2014.

Celebrity	Known for	Heat	Status
Brian McFadden	Singer-songwriter	1	Eliminated on 18 January 2015
Danielle Lloyd	Glamour model	1	Eliminated on 18 January 2015
Gareth Thomas	Welsh rugby league player	1	Eliminated on 18 January 2015
Sherrie Hewson	Actress & Loose Women panellist	1	Eliminated on 18 January 2015
Gaby Roslin	Television presenter	2	Eliminated on 25 January 2015
Nigel Havers	Television actor	2	Eliminated on 25 January 2015
Rufus Hound	Comedian	2	Eliminated on 25 January 2015
Sinitta	Singer & The X Factor mentor	2	Eliminated on 25 January 2015
Amy Willerton	Miss Universe Great Britain 2013	3	Eliminated on 1 February 2015
Chelsee Healey	Former Waterloo Road actress	3	Eliminated on 1 February 2015
Matthew Wolfenden; Natalie Anderson	Emmerdale actors	3	Eliminated on 1 February 2015
Phil Tufnell	England cricketer	3	Eliminated on 1 February 2015
Ann Widdecombe	Former Conservative Party politician	4	Eliminated on 8 February 2015
Elliott Wright	The Only Way Is Essex star	4	Eliminated on 8 February 2015
Nancy Dell'Olio	International lawyer	4	Eliminated on 8 February 2015
Oliver Mellor	Former Coronation Street actor	4	Eliminated on 8 February 2015
Jedward	Former The X Factor contestants	5	Eliminated on 15 February 2015
Nina Wadia	Former EastEnders actress	5	Eliminated on 15 February 2015
Roxy Shahidi	Emmerdale actress	5	Eliminated on 15 February 2015
Ruth Madoc	Hi-de-Hi! actress	5	Eliminated on 15 February 2015
Chip	Rapper	2	Eliminated on 22 February 2015
Matt Johnson	Former This Morning presenter	5	Eliminated on 22 February 2015
Claire Richards	Steps singer	4	Third place on 22 February 2015
James Bolam	Former New Tricks actor	3	Runner-up on 22 February 2015
Ray Quinn	Singer & Dancing on Ice champion	1	Winner on 22 February 2015

== Episodes ==
The first five episodes were all pre-recorded with the studio audience deciding who goes through to the live final.

=== Episode 1: Heat rounds (18 January) ===
Order	Celebrity	Mentor	Type of act	Result
1	Gareth Thomas	Circus Of Men	Ariel straps	Eliminated
2	Ray Quinn	Debra Stephenson	Impressions	Won
3	Danielle Lloyd	The Catwall Acrobats	Trampolining	Eliminated
4	Sherrie Hewson	Andrew Van Buren	Plate spinning	Eliminated
5	Brian McFadden	Penn & Teller	Escapology	Eliminated

=== Episode 2: Heat rounds (25 January) ===
Order	Celebrity	Mentor	Type of act	Result
1	Sinitta	Bendy Kate	Pole Fitness	Eliminated
2	Nigel Havers	Paul Zerdin	Ventriloquism	Eliminated
3	Chip	Shaolin Monks	Kung Fu Martial Arts	Won
4	Gaby Roslin	Marcus Monroe	Extreme Juggling	Eliminated
5	Rufus Hound	Jamie Allen	Magic	Eliminated

=== Episode 3: Heat rounds (1 February) ===
Order	Celebrity	Mentor	Type of act	Result
1	Amy Willerton	Moscow State Circus (The Veslovskis)	Roller-skating on podiums	Eliminated
2	James Bolam	Michael Ball	Singing	Won
3	Chelsee Healey	Starfiz Aerial	Aerial Silks	Eliminated
4	Phil Tufnell	Face Team	Acrobatic Basketball	Eliminated
5	Matthew Wolfenden; Natalie Anderson	Keelan Leyser's Quick Change Act	Quick Change	Eliminated

=== Episode 4: Heat rounds (8 February) ===
Order	Celebrity	Mentor	Type of act	Result
1	Claire Richards	Black Fire Girls	Fire Eating	Won
2	Elliott Wright	Billy George	Cyr Wheel	Eliminated
3	Nancy Dell'Olio	Hans Klok	Illusion	Eliminated
4	Oliver Mellor	Bottle Boys	Playing Music on Bottles	Eliminated
5	Ann Widdecombe	Norman Barrett MBE	Performing with Budgies	Eliminated

=== Episode 5: Heat rounds (15 February) ===
Order	Celebrity	Mentor	Type of act	Result
1	Matt Johnson	Tap Corps	Tap Dancing	Won
2	Ruth Madoc	Les Bubb	Mime	Eliminated
3	Roxy Shahidi	Pixie Le Knot	Contortion	Eliminated
4	Nina Wadia	Marc Paul	Mind Reading	Eliminated
5	Jedward	Jump Rope UK	Double Dutch Skipping	Eliminated

=== Episode 6: Live final (22 February) ===
Order	Celebrity	Mentor	Type of act	Result
1	Claire Richards	Black Fire Girls	Fire Eating	Finalist
2	Ray Quinn	Debra Stephenson	Impressions	Winner
3	Matt Johnson	Tap Corps	Tap Dancing	Finalist
4	James Bolam	Michael Ball	Singing	Runner Up
5	Chip	Shaolin Monks	Kung Fu Martial Arts	Third Place
