= Nicola Biondi =

Italian painter

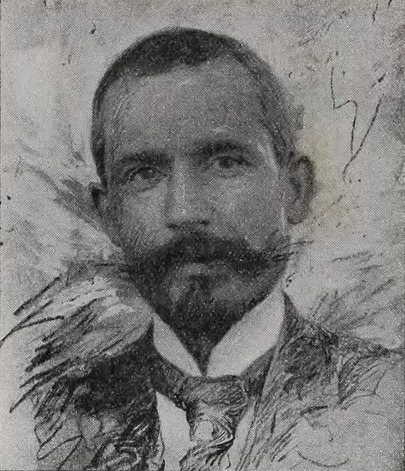
- Born: 7 October 1866
- Died: 1929 (aged 62–63); Naples
- Occupation: Painter, artist

Nicola Biondi (October 7, 1866 – 1929) was an Italian painter.

Born in Capua, he studied at the Istituto di Belle Arti in Naples. His thematic was eclectic and included genre and portraits in peasant dress. He exhibited at the Promotrice of Naples his nocturnal painting Una partita. In Rome he exhibited Ultima prova. Among his pupils was Scarano Marcello. Biondi died in Naples in 1929.
