= Ferdinand Biondi =

Canadian radio host (1909–1998)

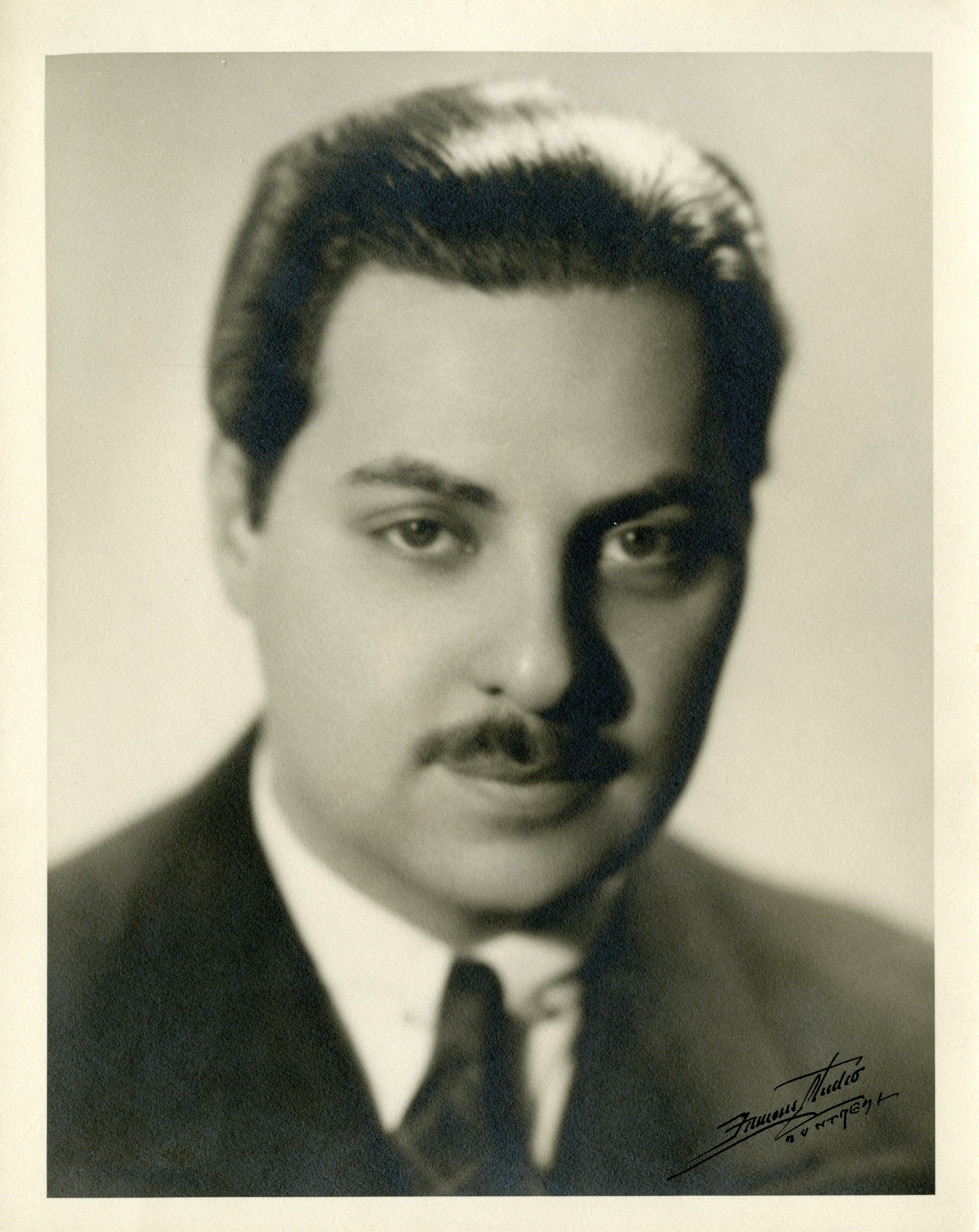
- Ferdinand Biondi in 1928.
- Born: 1909; Montreal, Quebec
- Died: 1998 (aged 88–89)
- Resting place: Notre Dame des Neiges Cemetery
- Presenting career
- Station: CKAC
- Country: Canada

Ferdinand Biondi, CM CQ (1909 – September 5, 1998) was a French Canadian radio broadcaster.

In 1936, he joined the Montreal radio station CKAC, where he would hold the positions of announcer, editor, producer, special programming director, senior producer, artistic director and news and public affairs director. He left in 1965, to become the Secretary-General of the Holy Cross Fathers at Saint Joseph's Oratory. In 1967, became the assistant to the Chairman of the Greater Montreal Arts Council and from 1976 to 1982 he was the Secretary General of the Montreal Arts Council.

In 1985, he was made a Knight of the National Order of Quebec. In 1987, he was made a Member of the Order of Canada for having "promoted the development of a Canadian private broadcasting system with ingenuity and dedication". In 1983, he was inducted into the Canadian Broadcast Hall of Fame. After his death in 1998, he was entombed at the Notre Dame des Neiges Cemetery in Montreal.
