= Silvio Mantelli =

Italian Salesian Catholic priest (born 1944)

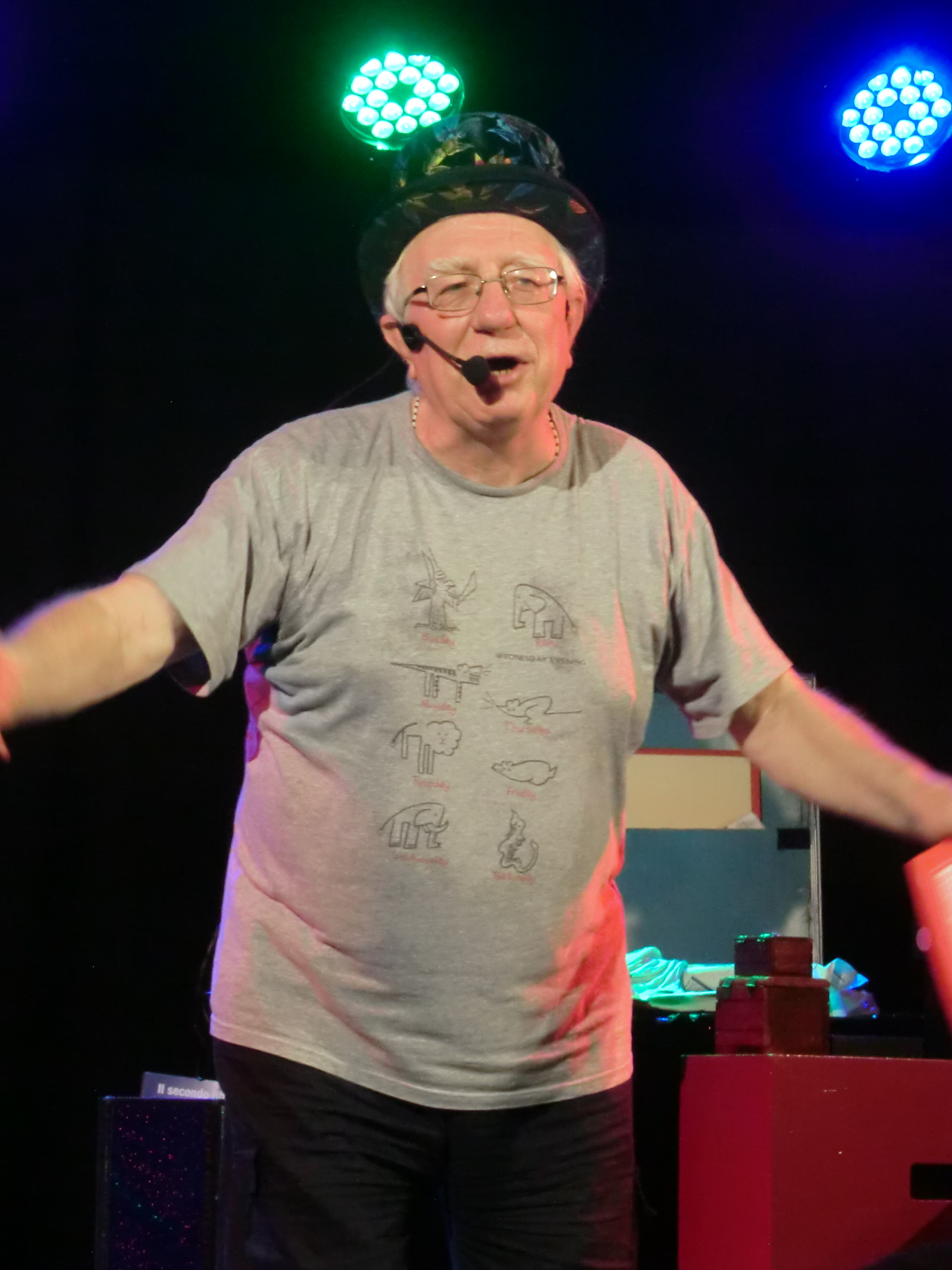
Silvio Mantelli

Silvio Mantelli (born 22 May 1944) is an Italian Salesian Catholic priest, whose principal ministry is that of a Gospel magician. His stage name is "Mago Sales".

He was born in Turin. He is currently the Director of Fondazione Mago Sales, an organization dedicated to Gospel Magic. He travels throughout Europe and the Third World to perform magic for children.

== Gospel Magic ==
He is the world's principal exponent of Gospel Magic, that is, the use of magic for cathetical purposes. Silvio Mantelli presented a magic wand to the Pope John Paul II in 2002 and petitioned the Pope to proclaim St. Don Bosco the Patron of Stage Magicians to which the Pope responded "You'll need a lot of magic wands to change our world; but let's make a start with this one!"

He is a member of the Society of American Magicians, the Catholic Magicians' Guild and London's famed Magic Circle.

== Magicians' Mass ==
Don Silvio invites magicians and other performers from around the world to attend a special Magician's Mass on the St. Don Bosco's feastday (January 31), held in Colle Don Bosco. They are invited to entertain the congregation.

== A Peaceful Christmas ==
Mantelli also runs a "magic tricks for guns" program entitled A Peaceful Christmas, where any child who turns in a toy gun will receive a magic kit in return. The idea has spread to many Italian cities involving more than 22,000 children.
