= Paul Biondi =

American composer

Paul Biondi, from Long Island, New York, United States, is a composer for television and guitar teacher. He has composed background music for many popular television shows, including:MTV Cribs, CBS Sports and various advertising spots (AT&T; Pepsi-Complex).

== Composer ==
=== Television ===
- MTV Cribs
- CBS Sports
- NFL Today (on CBS)
- 2008 Olympic Games (Team United States)
- Room Raiders (MTV)
- Human Giant (MTV)
- Pepsi-Complex fashion (advertising spots)
- MTV: Tr3s
- Masters Tournament (CBS Sports)
- World Series of Video Games (CBS Sports)
- MTV’s Living the Dream – reality television show
- Cablevision's Video On Demand Services

=== Industrial and Radio ===
- Satellite, Internet, College and Community radio
- Commercial and industrial training videos, DVDs and multimedia

=== Hurricane Jar - acoustic guitar music for television ===
Paul Biondi is also the writer and main performer behind the all acoustic Americana-Rock project Hurricane Jar. The Hurricane Jar project was the second artist release form the independent label Bang On Records. It was his first self-produced CD and was released in 2001.
