= Maria Domenica Fumasoni Biondi =

Italian archeologist (1766–1828)

- Born: Maria Domenica Fumasoni; 6 March 1766; Rome
- Died: 1828 (aged 61–62); Marino, Lazio
- Occupation: Archeologist
- Known for: Rediscovery of ancient techniques to weave asbestos fibers
- Spouse: Luigi Biondi
- Children: 1

Maria Domenica Fumasoni Biondi (1766–1828) was an Italian archeologist who rediscovered the ancient technique of weaving asbestos fibers after a fire-proof asbestos cloth was excavated from a Roman archeological site. (Asbestos is now known to be a toxic and a cancer-causing fibrous silicate mineral.)

== Biography ==
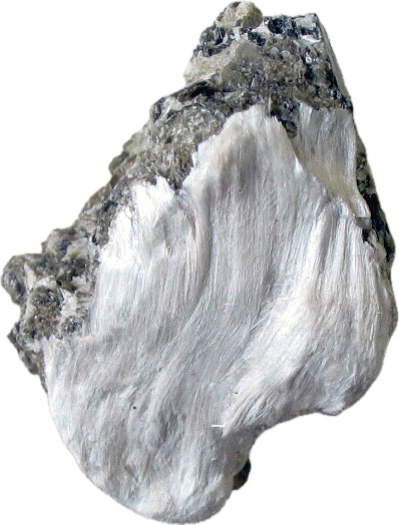
Silky asbestos fibers on muscovite. This sample came from the islands off Scotland.

Maria Domenica Fumasoni was born on 6 March 1766. She was living in Marino, Lazio, a town in the Castelli Romani, when she met the archaeologist Luigi Biondi who belonged to a noble family of Tuscan origin. The couple married in 1792 and they had a son, named Francesco Fumasoni Biondi. He became a poet and a notary in Marino and inherited the title of marquis that had been granted to his father in recognition of his services to Savoy.

While visiting the excavation of an ancient Roman burial site that her husband was working on near Villa Rufinella in Frascati, a woven asbestos cloth was unearthed there. Inspired by the complexity of the construction, Fumasoni Biondi took on the task of rediscovering the ancient technique used to weave the silky fibers. When she had succeeded, she presented her conclusions in 1806 in front of the Accademia dei Lincei (Italian Academy of Science), in the presence of esteemed scientists that included Feliciano Scarpellini, Giambattista Brocchi and Domenico Morichini. She hoped that her new techniques could help contemporary textile companies reproduce the asbestos cloth to manufacture fireproof materials.

She died in 1828 in Marino, Lazio, at the age of 62, leaving her husband bereft. He died in 1839.

The Roman street, Largo Maria Domenica Fumasoni Biondi, located along Via della Paglia (just behind the church of Santa Maria in the Trastevere district), was named in her honor in 1964. The plaque on the street honors Fumasoni Biondi as a "benemerita dell'artigianato" (in English, "a worthy craftswoman").
