= Duane Laflin =

American magician, teacher and innovator

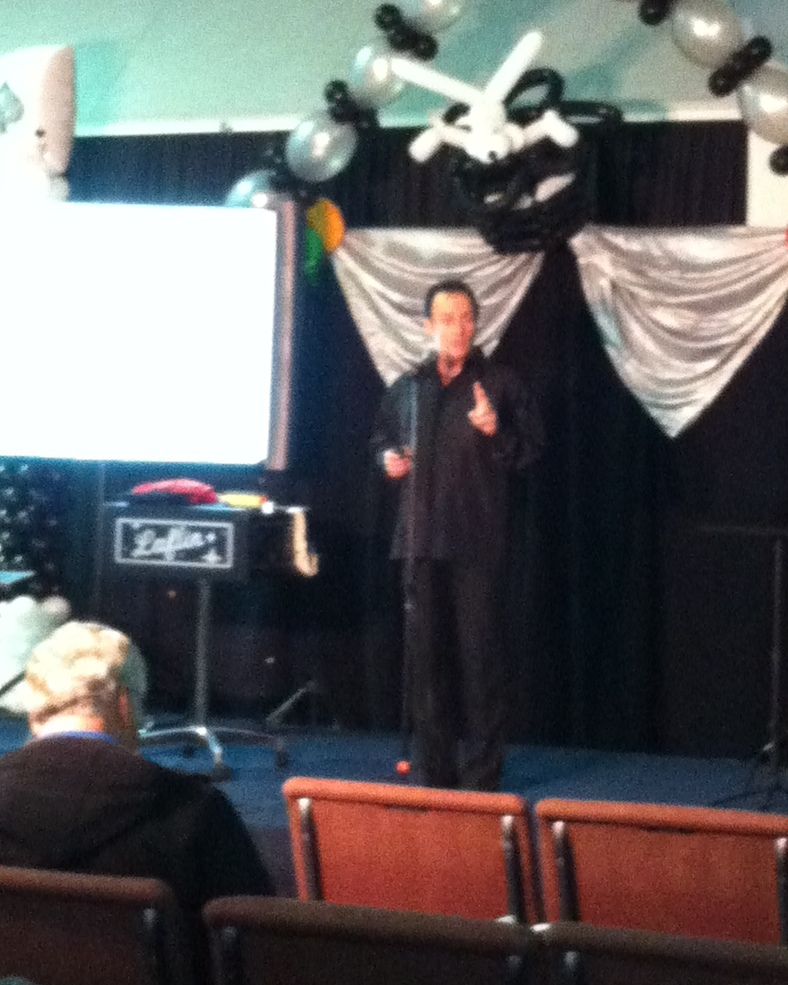
Duane teaching at an event in Tyler, Texas

Duane Laflin is an American magician, teacher and innovator. He initially marketed and sold his props, effects and accessories within his company, Laflin Magic but eventually closed his mail-order business to focus strictly on performing and lecturing. Ownership and rights to his props were eventually transferred to his daughter's company, Lock Family Magic. He is a former president of The International Fellowship of Christian Magicians. He is a sought-after lecturer among magic clubs throughout the U.S.

He was a featured lecturer at ClownFest 2004, a popular clown convention. He was also a featured lecturer at the 2007 convention of The International Brotherhood of Magicians held in Reno, Nevada. He produced and starred in a popular four-volume series of instructional videos on silk magic. He also produced and appeared in the instructional video, "Simply Beautiful Silk Magic".
