= Magic Circus Show =

- Also known as: Magic Circus Show
- Genre: Variety show
- Original languages: English; French
- No. of episodes: 3 editions

Production
- Executive producer: Damien Ottet
- Production locations: Circus Pajazzo, Geneva, Switzerland
- Running time: 90–100 minutes
- Production companies: European Broadcasting Union; 7 Street Productions

Original release
- Release: 26 November 2010 – 17 November 2012

The Magic Circus Show was an entertainment show organised by the European Broadcasting Union (EBU) and host broadcaster Radio Télévision Suisse (RTS), which aired in 2010, 2011 and 2012. Children aged between seven and fourteen representing eight countries within the EBU membership area, performed a variety of circus acts at the Geneva Christmas Circus (French: Cirque de Noël Genève). The main show was also accompanied by the Magic Circus Show Orchestra.

The programme was recorded at the end of November each year in the tent of Circus Pajazzo in Chêne-Bougeries, a town just outside Geneva in Switzerland.

== Background ==
The idea to make a magic circus show, where circus acts are performed by children, belonged to the Swiss national television and radio company RTS and Damien Ottet, who was the executive producer of 7 Street Productions and the director of children's programs for RTS. They presented the idea of holding a contest at the Eurovision TV congress, and the European Broadcasting Union responded to their proposal. The event was officially launched by the EBU on 5 October 2010 at MIPCOM in Cannes, France.

== Editions ==
The Magic Circus Show was a gala show and was recorded in advance and broadcast in the participating countries during the Christmas season. The first edition was held on 26 November 2010 with six countries participating: Belgium, the Netherlands, Portugal, Russia, France and the hosts Switzerland. The second edition took place on 26 November 2011 and Ukraine participated for the first time, making seven countries in total. The last edition took place on 17 November 2012 and nine countries participated: Bulgaria, Armenia and Ireland joined the show, however Ukraine did not return.

== Participation ==
Countries which participated in the show at least once. Countries which were eligible to participate, but didn’t.

Listed are all the countries that have ever taken part alongside the year in which they made their debut:

Year	Country making its début entry
2010	Belgium; France; Netherlands; Portugal; Russia; Switzerland
2011	Ukraine
2012	Armenia; Bulgaria; Ireland

== Broadcast ==
The following broadcasters participated at least once:

- Armenia (ARMTV)
- Belgium (VRT)
- Bulgaria (BNT)
- France (France 3)
- Ireland (RTÉ)
- Netherlands (TROS)
- Portugal (RTP)
- Russia (RTR)
- Switzerland (RTS)
- Ukraine (NTU)

The broadcasting rights for the inaugural show in 2010 were acquired by Belarus (BTRC), Italy (RAI), Slovenia (RTVSLO), TV5 Québec Canada and international francophone network, TV5Monde.
