= Mei Vata is a Appenzeller =

Traditional yodel Volksmusik song

Mei Vata is a Appenzeller (Standard German: Mein Vater ist ein Appenzeller; English: My Father is from Appenzell) is a traditional yodel Volksmusik song about the Swiss village of Appenzell, and which has been performed in various dialects of German over the years. Its first known attestation in written form is from 1827 under the name Min Vatter ischt en Appazeller; a later attestation from 1924 of a version from the Austrian area of Vorarlberg is under the name Mei Vota ischt a Appenzeller.

Its high-intensity yodel sections has made it popular for yodelling on television appearances.

== History ==
Yodeller Franzl Lang performed a 1-minute Bavarian dialect version of the song in the West German movie Salzburg Stories from 1957, establishing the yodel patterns that would later become synonymous with the song.

"Mei Vata is a Appenzeller"

Song by Franzl Lang

from the album Die schönsten Jodler der Welt
- Language: German
- Released: 1966
- Genre: Yodeling
- Length: 2:26
- Label: Fiesta
- Composer: Traditional lyrics

The first known artist to release a record of the song was the Austrian singer Lolita as a single in 1960. Lang would later release a 2 minute 26 second version of his Salzburg Stories version with different background instruments on the album Die schönsten Jodler der Welt in 1966.

Japanese yodeller Takeo Ischi first recorded a version on his debut album Der Jodelnde Japaner in 1978, based on Lang's version.

Russian singer Yazilya Mukhamyetova sung the song in the audition of the 2015 season of the Russian version of The Voice, getting one of the 4 judges to turn their chair towards her.

Norwegian singer Bjørn Tomren performed the song in Standard German with very high-intensity yodelling in the final of the 2021 version of the NRK1 music show Stjernekamp, which he won.
