= Takeo Ischi =

Japanese yodeler active in Germany (born 1947)

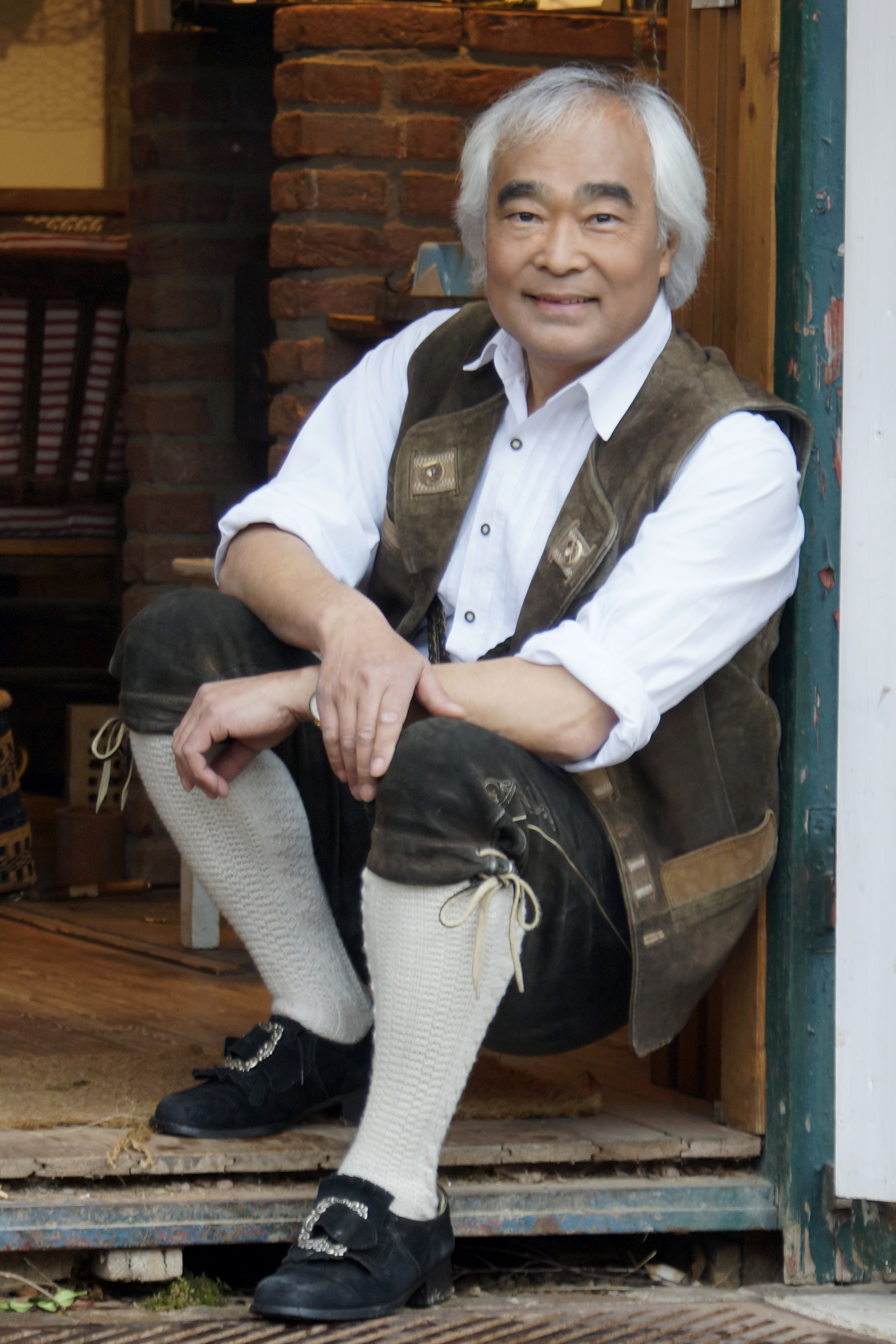
- Ischi in 2012

Background information
- Born: March 3, 1947 (age 79); Tokyo, Japan
- Origin: Tokyo, Japan
- Genres: Yodelling; Volkstümliche Musik; Europop
- Occupation: Yodeler
- Years active: 1986–2002, 2017–present
- Label: Rubin Records

Takeo Ishii (石井 健雄, Ishii Takeo; born March 3, 1947), Germanized as Ischi, is a Japanese yodeler active in Germany.

== Biography ==
Ischi was born and raised in Tokyo, Japan. In high school, he was a loner, but it was during this time that he first heard yodeling on the radio. Following his father, Ischi went to university for mechanical engineering. In his spare time he became engrossed with the zither and the hammered dulcimer, and learned to play these instruments. Using Franzl Lang's records, he taught himself to yodel, and began performing on Japanese television. During a six-month period where he studied abroad in Germany, Ischi went to Switzerland, where he sang at a beer hall in Zurich. He soon started earning money from this. From there he sang in front of Franzl Lang (The Jodlerkönig), his idol, and Lang took him under his wing. He performed on television with Maria Hellwig, and after that became known in German language circles as the "Japanese yodeler".

Ischi met his wife Henriette in 1981 and proposed to her three years later at an onsen (hot spring) in Japan, where he yodeled his proposal to her. They married in 1985 and had five children, four sons named Maximilian, Michael, Andreas and Lukas, and one daughter named Julia. They settled in Reit im Winkl in Bavaria, Germany.

A collaboration with The Gregory Brothers, "Chicken Attack", was released on January 25, 2017, and has received over 20 million views on YouTube. In 2019, a cover featuring the Taiwanese metal band Chthonic was released.

Ischi collaborated with The Gregory Brothers again for a series that was released on January 17, 2020. The first song in their series is "Chicken Pig Attack", with more songs promised in the future. The next song in their series, "Rat Attack", was released on January 24, 2020, followed by "Cow Attack" on January 28, 2022.

In 2021, he had a guest appearance in Belgian reality TV series The Mole.

== Discography ==
Der Jodelnde Japaner (1978)

1. De Bärge Zue
2. Mei Bibihenderl
3. Älpler-Jodel
4. Alphorn-Choral
5. Mei Vata Is A Appenzeller
6. Fahrt Ins Toggenburg
7. Jetz Wämmer Eis Jödele
8. Naturjodel
9. Ich Wünsch' Mir Eine Jodlerbraut
10. Es Glungnigs Manndli
11. Fifty-Fifty
12. Wenn Ich Auf Hohen Bergen Steh'
13. Chumm Mit I D'Bärge Ue
14. Auf Der Hirschweid

Grüße Aus Den Bergen (1985)

1. Japaner-Jodler
2. Grüße Aus Den Bergen
3. Über Sanfte Hügel
4. Bipi-Hendi
5. Wenn Ich Verliebt Bin Muss Ich Jodeln
6. Die Sonn' Und Die Berg
7. Jodler-Braut
8. Mein Jodlergruß
9. Lieserl
10. Ski-Twist-Jodler
11. Steirerbua
12. Suki Yaki

Der Japanische Jodler (1990)

1. Frau Vetterli, Frau Vetterli
2. I Bin A Kehlkopfakrobat
3. Im Stadl Ist Heut' Jodlerball
4. Haben Sie Schon Meinen Kleinen Moritz Geseh'n?
5. Der Schönste Bart
6. Der Japanische Jodler
7. Die Bayerische Gemütlichkeit
8. Ohne Musik Kann Der Mensch Nicht Leben
9. Hochzeitsnacht Im Hühnerstall
10. Sukiyaki Mit Knödel Und Kraut
11. Der König Vom Berchtesgad'ner Land
12. Nimm' Doch Dem Hund Seinen Knochen Nicht Weg!
13. Ein Jodler Fühlt Sich Wohl
14. Sayonara (Japanischer Abschiedsjodler)

Der Jodelcasanova - Together with Das Salzburg Quintett

1. Klarinetten-Muckl Jodler
2. Der Jodelcasanova
3. Kufsteiner Lied
4. Der Brauttraum
5. Bei Der Wirtin Zum Stern
6. Im Wald Drauß Is Schön
7. Schützenliesl
8. Nachtigall Jodler
9. Zwei Spuren Im Schnee
10. Wenn I Von Der Alm Abergeh
11. Glockenspiel
12. Ein Fest Der Musikanten

Kann Denn Jodeln Sünde Sein?

1. Sukiyaki Mit Knödel Und Kraut
2. Urlaub Auf Dem Bauernhof
3. Jodel Medley: Siebentausend Rinder + Auf Meiner Ranch Bin Ich König
4. Alm-Jodel-Boogie
5. Die Straße Nach St. Johann
6. Kann Denn Jodeln Sünde Sein?
7. Mir San O.k. Und Net O.k.
8. Im Bundestag Wird Heut' Gejodelt
9. Im Gasthaus Zum Hirschn
10. In Yokohama
11. Der Heuboden-Jodler
12. Das Muß Wohl Der Himmel Sein
13. Ich Such' Mir Eine Kuschelmaus, Die Jodeln Kann
14. In Reit Im Winkel, Da Bin Ich Zu Haus

Der Küstenjodler

1. Der Küstenjodler
2. Wer hat nur Dir das Jodeln beigebracht
3. Bockwurst, Bier und Blasmusik

New Bibi-Hendl

1. New Bibi-Hendl (Rap)
2. New Bibi-Hendl (Heimatsender-Mix)
3. New Appenzeller
4. New Bibi-Hendl (Extended Dance-Version)
5. New Bibi-Hendl (Karaoke-Version)

Bockwurst, Bier und Blasmusik

1. Bockwurst, Bier und Blasmusik
2. Ich fang den Tag mit einem Jodler an

Wer hat nur Dir das Jodeln beigebracht (1999)

1. Wer hat nur Dir das Jodeln beigebracht
2. Bockwurst, Bier und Blasmusik
3. Ich fang den Tag mit einem Jodler an

Der Import-Hit aus Japan (2003)

1. Bibi-Hendl
2. Der Import-Hit aus Japan
3. Zwei Spuren im Schnee
4. Appenzeller
5. In jeder Sprache klingt es gleich
6. Wer hat nur Dir das Jodeln beigebracht
7. Der Liebes-Jodler
8. Bergvagabunden
9. Der Küsten-Jodler
10. Bockwurst, Bier und Blasmusik
11. Ich fang den Tag mit einem Jodler an
12. Jagertee im Pulverschnee - gemeinsam mit Maria & Margot Hellwig
13. Bibi-Hendl (Extended Dance-Version) (bonus track)

Die hr4-Weihnachts-CD

- Zwei Spuren im Schnee - Takeo Ischi

Edelweiss der Volksmusik - Volume 1

- Wer hat nur Dir das Jodeln beigebracht - Takeo Ischi

Festival der Volksmusik Volume 1

- Der Küstenjodler - Takeo Ischi

Schlager & Gute Laune Festival Die Hits von CD 2

- Takeo Ischi * New Bibi-Hendl (Rap)

Lieder die von Herzen kommen Volume 1

- Der Küsten-Jodler - Takeo Ischi

Maria Hellwig - Ich möcht so gerne Urgroßmutter sein

- Takeo Ischi - Der Küstenjodler
