= Kenny Roberts (musician) =

American country music singer-songwriter (1926–2012)

George S. Kingsbury Jr. (October 14, 1926 – April 29, 2012), better known as Kenny Roberts, was an American country music singer. He is best known for his recordings of "I Never See Maggie Alone" and "Choc'late Ice Cream Cone", and was a member of The Down Homers with Bill Haley.

== Life and career ==
Roberts was born in Lenoir City, Tennessee, United States, and raised on a farm outside of Greenfield, Massachusetts. He started in music at the age of 11, when he organized a band consisting entirely of young harmonica players. Later, he learned to play guitar and then bass fiddle and violin. He was inspired by Yodeling Slim Clark (with whom he performed along with the Red River Rangers from Athol, Massachusetts), as well as by Jimmie Rodgers and other singing cowboys, and was known as a blue yodeler. Roberts at age 17 won a New Hampshire radio contest to be chosen as "Eastern States Yodeling Champion" in 1944.

He enlisted in the U.S. Navy in early 1945, then moved to Fort Wayne, Indiana, after World War II ended. He performed on several shows on radio station KMOX in St. Louis, Missouri, as well as the CBS Saturday morning show, Barnyard Frolics, then organized and led a Pennsylvania-based western swing band called the Down Homers, recording for Vogue Records.

Rock and roll pioneer Bill Haley joined the band in 1946 as a guitarist and yodeler, replacing Roberts who had joined the Navy. Before departing, Roberts taught Haley some of his yodels. When Roberts returned from service, he resumed his spot with the Down Homers relieving Haley. In the early 2000s, a set of 1946 radio recordings by the Down Homers were discovered, and Haley is named and performs the solo number "She Taught Me to Yodel."

Roberts signed a recording contract with Coral Records in 1949, a division of Decca. His first release "I Never See Maggie Alone" was an immediate hit. It sold a million copies. He followed with other hits including "River of Tears," "I've Got the Blues," "Yodel Polka," "She Taught Me to Yodel," and "Hillbilly Style."

He soon began to jump while yodeling and became popular with youngsters thanks to the jumping, yodeling and his cowboy tunes. He starred in a children's TV show in 1953, performing in Cincinnati on WLW-TV. He performed on Arthur Godfrey's CBS network talent program.

Roberts played at the Hoosier Hop in Fort Wayne, as well as the WCOP Hayloft Jamboree. He later performed on the Midwestern Hayride during the 1950s from Cincinnati. He became a regional star through television shows in Dayton, Ohio, and Indianapolis, Indiana. He began a daily cartoon show on WNEM TV-5 in Saginaw, Michigan, in 1961, as The Kenny Roberts Show where he was known as "The Yodeling Cowboy", or (according to at least one former child guest) "The Jumping Cowboy". The popular black-and-white show featured Roberts singing and playing guitar as he hosted children in the studio, and presented cartoons. His best known locally performed songs were "Cheer Up, (Things Could Be Worse)" and the poignant Hank Williams tribute song "Sing Me A Hurtin' Song" (A/B of a 45 record on Bethlehem Records). The program stayed on the air for about five years. Roberts moved back to Dayton in the early 1970s, and later, moved back to Massachusetts. He played concerts in the region, and released an album for Palomino around 1980, followed by Longhorn's "Then and Now," which combined historical cuts with new recordings.

Though essentially retired, he continued to give concerts around the Northeast throughout the decade.

Roberts died in April 2012 in Athol, Massachusetts, aged 85.
