= Tahrir (vocal technique) =

Vocal technique in Persian classical music

Tahrir is a melismatic form in Persian classical singing that employs a vocal technique involving rapid glottal strokes over a series of notes. It is considered "an ornament of the melodic line," consisting of one or more short frequency jumps—called tekye—towards higher pitches. Tahrir is sometimes referred to as a form of yodeling.
