= Mike Johnson (yodeler) =

American singer-songwriter

- Born: 1946 (age 79–80)
- Instruments: Yodeling, guitar
- Years active: 1966–present
- Labels: Roughshod Records and You and Me Records

Mike Johnson (born 1946) is an American country music yodeler, singer, and songwriter living in Arlington, Virginia.

Raised in a Catholic family in Washington, D.C., Johnson began yodeling in the 1950s, imitating the "Tarzan yell" of actor Johnny Weissmuller. Later he would be influenced by the music of Jimmie Rodgers, Gene Autry, and Roy Rogers. Johnson enlisted in the US Navy in 1965 and served two Vietnam tours from 1967 to 1969 on the USS Constellation CVA-64. From his first professional recording session at Globe Recording Studio in April 1981 in Nashville, he released his first 45 rpm single "King of the Fish." Later he became a truck driver, in September 1981. Johnson founded Pata del Lobo Music publishing in 1982, and Roughshod Records and You and Me Records in 1987. Since April 1981 Johnson has released two 45 rpm vinyls, 11 cassettes, and 65 CDs.

== Awards and recognition ==
- Inducted into America's Old-Time Country Music Hall Of Fame by The National Traditional Country Music Association at the 27th Annual Old-Time Country Music Festival, in Avoca, Iowa, September 2002
- 114 of his yodels were acquired by the Library of Congress' Recorded Sound Reference Center's permanent music collection in April 2007
- received Lifetime Achievement Award from National Traditional Country Music Association in August 2016 at 41st Annual Old Time Country Music Festival, LeMars, Iowa.

Johnson received a 2017 Legendary Honky Tonk CD of the Year Award from the National Traditional Country Music Association at their 2017 Old Time Country Music Festival in LeMars, Iowa. Johnson received a 2017 Legendary Honky Tonk CD of the Year Award from the National Traditional Country Music Association at their 2017 Old Time Country Music Festival in LeMars, Iowa.

- Bob Everhart, founder and president of the National Traditional Country Music Association in 1975, died at the age of 85 on 20 August 2021. His wife terminated the organization shortly thereafter.

== Works ==
=== Discography ===
- 1981 King of the Fish 45 rpm
- 1983 Mike Johnson's Guitar Songs Vol.1 cassette
- 1986 Hooked On Rodeo 45 rpm
- 1986 I Believe In Roy Rogers cassette
- 1986 Did You Hug Your Mother Today? cassette
- 1993 Black Yodel No.1 the Song the Songwriter cassette
- 1994 Did You Hug Your Mother Today? cassette
- 1995 Just a Nobody cassette
- 1995 Take Time Out cassette
- 1995 As Long As There Is Music cassette
- 1996 I Believe In Roy Rogers cassette
- 1996 Did You Hug Your Mother Today? cassette
- 1996 Mike Johnson’s Guitar Songs Vol.1 cassette
- 1999 Black Yodel No.1 the Song the Songwriter CD
- 1999 Did You Hug Your Mother Today? CD
- 2000 Country Classics Radio DJ Special CD
- 2000 King of the Fish CD
- 2001 Yodeling McDonald Craig CD
- 2001 Take Time Out CD
- 2001 A Piano Interpretation by Thanh Bui CD
- 2001 Mike Johnson’s Guitar Songs “1983 Collectors Classic” CD
- 2002 Hooked On Rodeo CD
- 2002 Mike Johnson’s Guitar Songs Vol.2 CD
- 2002 Mike Johnson Live! CD
- 2002 Three Country Music Yodelers CD
- 2003 Your Cheatin’ Heart CD
- 2004 Roughshod Records Sampler1 CD
- 2004 Did You Hug Your Mother Today? 17th Anniversary CD
- 2004 Did You Hug Your Mother Today? CD
- 2004 Sammy CD
- 2004 Here’s to Jim and Tammy CD
- 2004 Pictures On the Wall CD
- 2004 King of the Road CD
- 2006 Music by Mike CD
- 2006 Mike Johnson Yodeling 40 Years CD
- 2006 Frank Hunter Singing Favorite Country Classics CD
- 2007 Mike Johnson’s Guitar Songs Vol.3 CD
- 2007 The Wall CD
- 2007 To Monna the Rose of My Heart CD
- 2007 Mike Johnson’s Guitar Songs Vol.4 CD
- 2008 Mike Johnson’s Guitar Songs Vol.5 CD
- 2008 Mike Johnson’s Guitar Songs Vol. 6 CD
- 2008 Mike Johnson’s Guitar Songs Vol.7 CD
- 2008 Please Don’t Squeeze the Charmin CD
- 2008 Songs For All Ages CD
- 2009 Yeah I’m a Cowboy CD
- 2009 Roughshod Records Sampler2 CD
- 2010 Just a Nobody CD
- 2010 Mike Johnson & Freddie the Swedish Fiddler CD
- 2010 Mike Johnson Live at the Songsmith CD
- 2010 Mike Johnson Live at Whitey’s CD
- 2010 Mike Johnson Live at Royal Lee’s Deli CD
- 2010 Mike Johnson Live at Tucson Café CD
- 2012 Livin’ Lost Love On the Jukebox Again CD
- 2012 Back Home Again CD
- 2012 Roughshod Records Sampler3 CD
- 2012 Roughshod Records Sampler4 CD
- 2014 Roughshod Records Sampler5 CD
- 2014 Roughshod Records Pre-Release CD
- 2014 Old Time Country Songs Pre-Release CD
- 2014 Doggone It I’ve Written a Sad Song Again Pre-Release CD
- 2014 Old Time Country Songs Are They Really Dead and Gone? CD
- 2014 Doggone It I’ve Written a Sad Song Again CD
- 2014 SideKicks Christmas Special CD
- 2015 Country Sounds CD
- 2016 Let Me Die In a Honky Tonk CD
- 2016 My Heart Still Sees CD
- 2016 Roughshod Records Sampler CD
- 2017 Going Places CD
- 2017 Here We Go Again CD
- 2017 Covering James Adelsberger CD
- 2018 SideKicks Antics CD
- 2019 Cockco Doodle Doo CD
- 2020 In Memory of Leo P. Maimone CD
- 2022 Mike Johnson’s Guitar Songs Vol.8 CD
- 2022 Second Time Around CD
- 2022 Mike Johnson’s Guitar Songs Vol.9 CD
- 2022 Mike Johnson’s Guitar Songs Vol.10 CD
- 2022 Mike Johnson’s Yodel Song Archives CD

==== Compilations ====
- Rough Guide to Yodel (2006)

=== Books ===
- Johnson, Mike (13 December 2012). I Just Wanted to Be a Songwriter: A Mike Johnson Music Anthology. MAJJ Productions. ISBN 978-0-615-75114-6.
