= Zäuerli =

Swiss folk music

Zäuerli is a type of traditional Swiss folk music, common in the Appenzell region of Switzerland. It can be described as 'voiceless yodeling', and is characterised by slower tempo and lower vocal range than in other types of yodeling, making it sound somewhat 'sad'.

== In popular culture ==
Zäuerli music was part of the soundtrack of the film The Grand Budapest Hotel.
