= Yodeling =

Form of singing

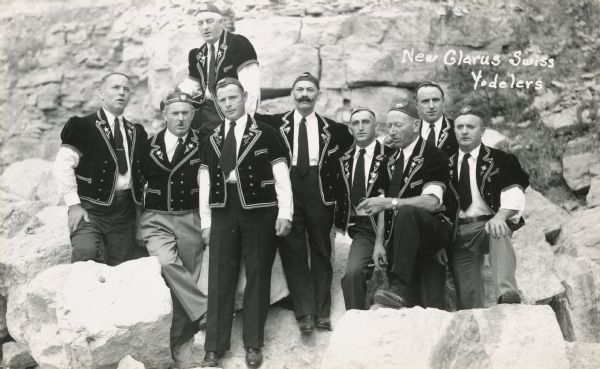
- New Glarus, Wisconsin, yodelers in traditional Swiss garb (1922)
- Stylistic origins: Volksmusik
- Typical instruments: Human voice

Yodeling
- UNESCO Intangible Cultural Heritage
- Country: [[German-speaking Switzerland and Liechtenstein]]
- Reference: 02287
- Region: Europe

Inscription history
- Inscription: 2025 (20th session)
- List: Representative

Yodeling (also jodeling or yodelling) is a form of singing which involves repeated and rapid changes of pitch between the low-pitch chest register (or "chest voice") and the high-pitch head register or falsetto. The English word yodel is derived from the German word jodeln, meaning "to utter the syllable jo" (pronounced "yo"). This vocal technique is used in many cultures worldwide. Recent scientific research concerning yodeling and non-Western cultures suggests that music and speech may have evolved from a common prosodic precursor.

Alpine yodeling was a longtime rural tradition in Europe, and became popular in the 1830s as entertainment in theaters and music halls. In Europe, yodeling is still a major feature of folk music (Volksmusik) from Switzerland, Austria, Southern Germany, the Eastern French regions of Alsace and Savoy, the Northern Italian region of Trentino-Alto Adige/Südtirol, and the Alpine regions of Slovenia, and can be heard in many contemporary folk songs, which are also featured on regular TV broadcasts.

== History of Alpine yodeling ==
Viennese yodel singer Agnes Palmisano performing a traditional "Wiener Dudler" (Viennese yodel)

Most experts agree that yodeling was used in the Central Alps by herders calling their flocks or to communicate between Alpine villages. The multi-pitched "yelling" later became part of the region's traditional lore and musical expression. The earliest record of a yodel is in 1545, where it is described as "the call of a cowherd from Appenzell". Music historian Timothy Wise writes:

From its earliest entry into European music of whatever type, the yodel tended to be associated with nature, instinct, wilderness, pre-industrial and pastoral civilization, or similar ideas. It continues to be associated with rural and folk musics or to connote those in other contexts. Because of this original folk connection, yodeling remained associated with the outdoors, with rustic rather than sophisticated personae, and with particular emotional or psychological states or semantic fields.

British stage performances by yodelers were common in the nineteenth century. Sir Walter Scott wrote in his June 4, 1830, journal entry that "Anne wants me to go hear the Tyrolese Minstrels but ... I cannot but think their yodeling ... is a variation upon the tones of a jackass." In Europe, yodeling is still a major feature of folk music (Volksmusik) from Switzerland, Austria, and southern Germany, and the Swiss Amish in the United States maintain the practice of yodeling to this day.

In 2025, Switzerland’s yodeling was recognized as intangible cultural heritage by UNESCO.

== Yodeling around the world ==
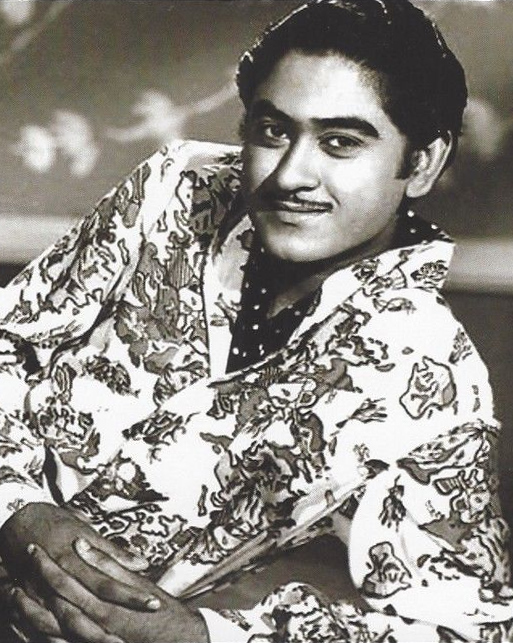
Indian playback singer Kishore Kumar (1929–1987), one of the greatest and most popular Indian playback singers, notable for his yodeling

Apart from the Alps, yodeling can be found in the Solomon Islands, Hawaii, Madagascar, the US, Romania, Bulgaria, and Africa.

Although yodeling is associated with the Swiss Alps and Austrian Tyrol, ethnomusicologists believe that its origins can be traced back tens of thousands of years to ancient African nomadic hunter-gatherer societies.

In Scandinavian folk music, the oral-song tradition Kulning (Norwegian: Laling), also called huving, is a form of signal song, a shout to make themselves known over a long distance, especially used in the mountains. Usually it is linked to a transhumance tradition. The cry could be individually designed so that it was not just a cry for contact, but also a signifier used to identify the singer. The cry may have a form of text, but is just as well without words. Laling is related to yodeling in Switzerland and Austria. The overture Hjalarljod has a background in the phenomenon of yodeling. Laling is a mix of yelling and singing, and is closely related to lokk. Huving was spent in the woods and mountains to call the animals, and get in touch with other people, such as other shepherds or people on the neighboring mountain farm and to give messages over long distances.

In Slovenian traditional folk culture, yodeling (jodlanje) and falsetto pastoral calls (vriskanje and ukanje) were historically used by herders in the Julian and Kamnik–Savinja Alps to communicate across pastures. The style later became an integral component of Slovenian Alpine folk music (narodnozabavna glasba).

In Persian classical music, singers frequently use tahrir ("tremolo" in English), a yodeling technique that oscillates on neighbor tones. It is similar to the Swiss yodel, and is used as an ornament or trill in phrases that have long syllables, and usually falls at the end of a phrase. Tahrir is also prevalent in Azerbaijani, Bulgarian, Macedonian, Turkish, Armenian, Afghan, and Central Asian musical traditions, and to a lesser extent in Pakistani and some Indian music.

At the same time, there is an ancient rooted vocal style among Kurdish people of central Zagros of Iran, Known as Hoore[h], based on mocking the sounds of birds such as quail or partridge, mostly among the Ghalkhani and Kalhor tribes, much nearer to technically correct "yodeling".

In Georgian traditional music, yodeling takes the form of krimanchuli technique, and is used as a top part in three- or four-part polyphony. Yodel-like shamanistic traditions are also seen among the Turkic Sakha people of Siberia, the Inuit of the Arctic regions of Greenland and the Saami of Scandinavia. Among the Irish and Scottish peoples hints of yodeling-like sounds are also evident. In Sakha Yakutian, yodeling plays a very important role in the way to address nature and to plead for the continuance of life.

In Central Africa, Pygmy singers use yodels within their elaborate polyphonic singing, and the Shona people of Zimbabwe sometimes yodel while playing the mbira. The Mbuti of the Congo incorporate distinctive whistles and yodels into their songs. Living from hunting and gathering, they sing hunting and harvest songs and use yodelling to call each other. In 1952, ethnomusicologist Hugh Tracey recorded their songs and they have been released on compact discs.

In Romanian traditional folk music, yodeling takes the form of hăulit and "horea cu noduri". "Horea cu noduri" mostly used as a way of expressing sorrow. "Horea cu noduri" (knots singing style) is a particular manner of "doina" interpretation acquired through a guttural vocal technique, the knots being strikes of the glottis through the neck muscles contractions.

Many Hawaiian songs feature falsetto. In Hawaiian-style falsetto – called ka leo kiʻekiʻe – the singer, usually male, emphasizes the break between registers. Sometimes the singer exaggerates the break through repetition, as a yodel. As with other aspects of Hawaiian music, falsetto developed from a combination of sources, including pre-European Hawaiian chanting, early Christian hymn singing and the songs and yodeling of immigrant cowboys, called "paniolos" in the Hawaiian language, during the Kamehameha Reign in the 1800s when cowboys were brought from Mexico to teach Hawaiians how to care for cattle.

Yodelling arrived in America in the mid-19th century and was propagated through travelling entertainment shows.

== Technique ==
Human voices have at least two distinct vocal registers, called the "head" and "chest" voices. Most people can sing tones within a certain range of lower pitches in their chest voice and tones within a certain range of higher pitch in their head voice. Falsetto is an "unsupported" register forcing vocal cords into a higher pitch without any head or chest voice air support. The range of overlap between registers, called the passaggio, can be challenging for untrained singers. Experienced singers can control their voices in this range, easily switching between registers. Yodeling is a version of this technique in which a singer might change register several times in only a few seconds and at a high volume. Repeated alternation between registers at a singer's passaggio pitch range produces a very distinctive sound. For example, in the famous "Yodel – Ay – EEE – Oooo", the "EEE" is sung in the head voice while all other syllables are in the chest voice.

Bart Plantenga, author of Yodel-Ay-Ee-Oooo: The Secret History of Yodeling Around the World, explains the technique:

The basic yodel requires sudden alterations of vocal register from a low-pitched chest voice to high falsetto tones sung on vowel sounds: AH, OH, OO for chest notes and AY or EE for the falsetto. Consonants are used as levers to launch the dramatic leap from low to high, giving it its unique ear-penetrating and distance-spanning power.

The best places for Alpine-style yodelling are those with an echo. Ideal natural locations include not only mountain ranges but lakes, rocky gorges or shorelines, and high or open areas with one or more distant rock faces.

Technically, yodelling can be described as singing with melodious, inarticulate sounds and frequent changes between falsetto and the normal voice.

"Inarticulated singing from the throat," as yodeling was described in a travel diary of 1810, is not only an Alpine speciality, but can be found in several other parts of the world. The constant change of register between the normal voice and falsetto produces a loud, piercing sound which makes the yodel an effective call for herdsmen to their animals, as well as to each other across mountainous terrain.

== Yodeling in the United States ==
It is thought that yodeling was first introduced to the United States by German immigrants in Pennsylvania in the early 1800s. As the new settlers traveled south through the Appalachian Mountains and beyond into the Deep South they came into contact with Scots and Irish immigrants, Scandinavians (practitioners of a unique yodeling called kulning), and other nationalities including African enslaved people who communicated with "field hollers", described by Frederick Law Olmsted in 1853 as a "long, loud, musical shout, rising and falling and breaking into falsetto".

In 1839, the Tyrolese Minstrels toured the United States and started an American craze for Alpine music. During the 1840s, dozens of German, Swiss, and Austrian singing groups crisscrossed the country entertaining audiences with a combination of singing, yodeling, and "Alpine harmony." The popularity of the European groups led to the formation of many American family singing groups as well. The most popular was the Hutchison Family Singers who toured, singing harmony and yodeling. Minstrel shows parodied the Hutchinson's yodeling with their own, calling it "Tyrolesian business". In 1853, Christy's Minstrels burlesqued (parodied) the Hutchinson Family singing 'We Come From the Hills With Tyrolean Echo'.

Sleep, Baby, Sleep (Watson, 1911)

Other traveling American minstrels were yodeling in the United States as well. Tom Christian was the first American yodeling minstrel, appearing in 1847 in Chicago. Recordings of yodelers were made in 1892 and in 1920 the Victor recording company listed 17 yodels in their catalogue, many of them by George Watson, the most successful yodeler of the time. In 1902, Watson recorded the song "Hush-a-bye Baby," which was later recorded in 1924 by Riley Puckett as "Rock All Our Babies to Sleep," the first country yodeling record ever made. Earlier, in 1897, Watson had recorded "Sleep, Baby, Sleep" which Puckett recorded in 1927 as the second-ever country yodeling record. "Sleep, Baby, Sleep" was also the first song ever recorded by Jimmie Rodgers (at the Bristol sessions in 1928); Rodgers would eventually come to be known as the father of both country music and American yodeling when he combined the yodel with southern African-American blues.

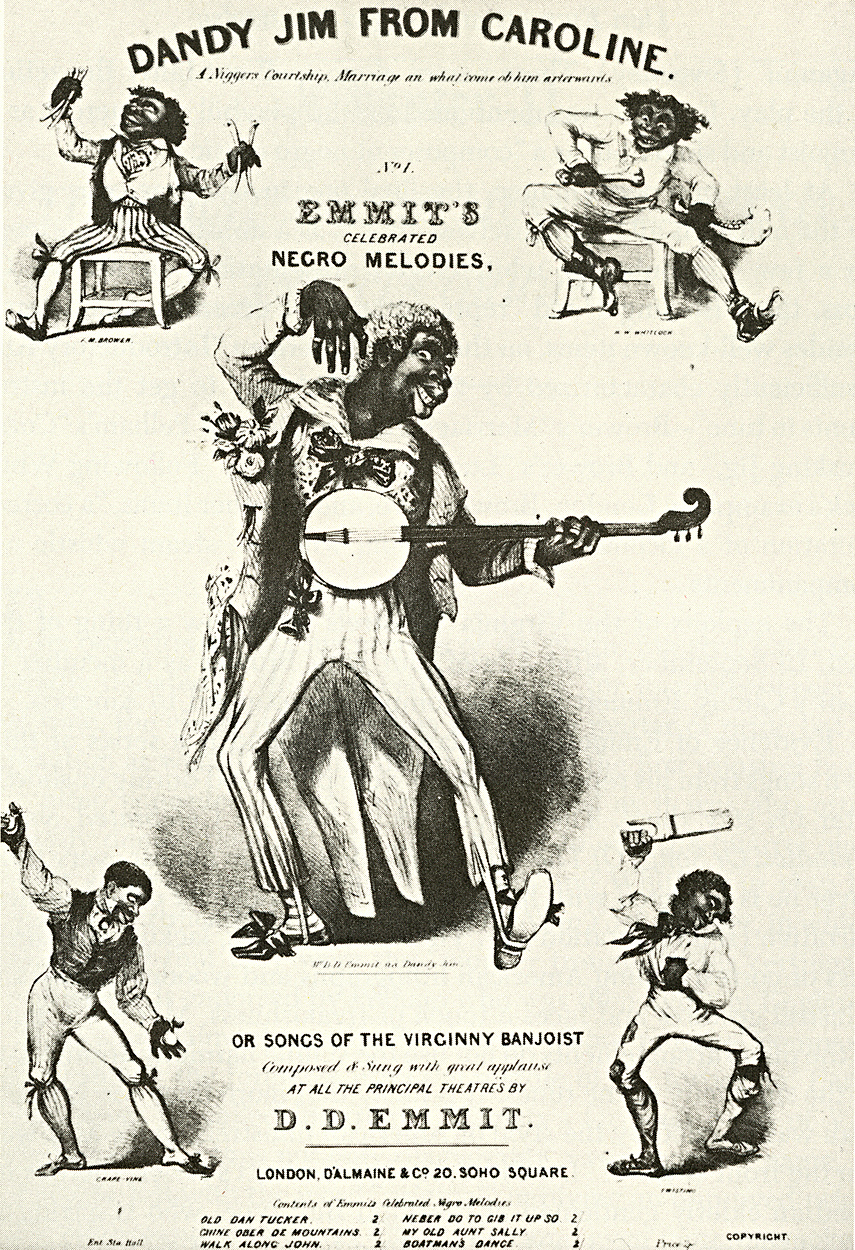
Sheet music cover for "Dandy Jim from Caroline", featuring Dan Emmett (center) and the other Virginia Minstrels, c. 1844

In the United States, traveling minstrels were yodeling in the 19th century, and, in 1920, the Victor recording company listed 17 yodels in their catalogue. In 1928, blending Alpine yodeling with African American work and blues music styles and traditional folk music, Jimmie Rodgers released his recording "Blue Yodel No. 1". Rodgers' "blue yodel", a term sometimes used to differentiate the earlier Austrian yodeling from the American form of yodeling introduced by Rodgers, created an instant national craze for yodeling in the United States; according to a black musician who lived near Rodgers in Mississippi, both black and white musicians began to copy Rodgers' style of vocal delivery.

When sound films first became available in the 1930s the industry began to turn out numerous films to meet the nation's fascination with the American cowboy. The singing cowboy was a subtype of the archetypal cowboy hero of early Western films, popularized by many of the B-movies of the 1930s and 1940s. The transformation of Rodgers' blue yodel to the cowboy yodel involved both a change in rhythm and a move away from Southern blues-type lyrics. Some yodels contained more of the Alpine type of yodel as well. Most famous of the singing cowboy film stars were Gene Autry and Roy Rogers, both accomplished yodelers. The popularity of yodeling lasted through the 1940s, but by the 1950s it became rare to hear yodeling in country and western music.

The American minstrel show consisted of comic skits, variety acts, dancing, and music, performed by white people in blackface or, especially after the American Civil War, black people in blackface. Minstrel shows toured the same circuits as opera companies, circuses, and European entertainers, with venues ranging from lavish opera houses to makeshift tavern stages. When the European Tyrolese Minstrels toured the United States for several years in the early 1840s and created an American craze for Alpine yodeling music, four unemployed white actors decided to stage an African-American style spoof of this group's concerts. Calling themselves Dan Emmett's Virginia Minstrels, the performance was wildly popular and most historians mark this production as the beginning of minstrelsy in the U.S. According to jazz historian Gary Giddins:

Though antebellum (minstrel) troupes were white, the form developed in a form of racial collaboration, illustrating the axiom that defines – and continues to define – American music as it developed over the next century and a half: African American innovations metamorphose into American popular culture when white performers learn to mimic black ones.

== Performers ==
=== Early recordings ===
Entertainer J.K. Emmet (1841–91) was probably the most well-known yodeler of his time. He did make recordings but died before the recording industry was firmly established. Many future yodelers recorded songs he had either written or made popular, including "Sleep, Baby, Sleep". In the 1910s, the competing disc record system triumphed in the marketplace to become the dominant commercial audio medium.

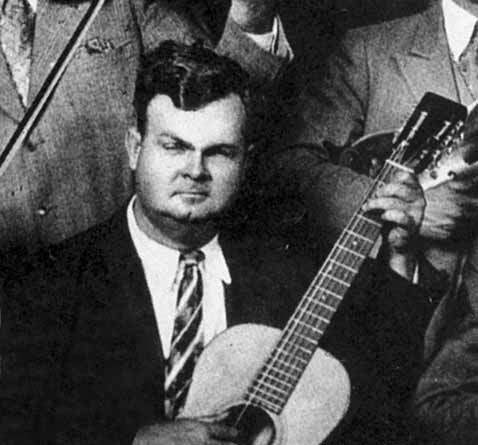
Riley Puckett

Most music historians say that the first country music record to include yodeling was "Rock All Our Babies to Sleep" sung by Riley Puckett, a blind singer from Georgia. In 1924 in country music, his recording was one of the top hits of that year. Another early yodeler was Emmett Miller, a minstrel show performer, also from Georgia. In the 1920s, Miller recorded the song "Lovesick Blues", which was later a major hit for country singer Hank Williams. Bob Wills, the King of Western Swing, and many others were also influenced by Miller. Miller's version of "Lovesick Blues" is available on YouTube with a jacket illustration of Miller in blackface.

In the early 1920s, African-American Winston Holmes started a record label, Merritt Records, and was a performer himself. His vocals included bird calls, train whistles and yodels. He managed and made some songs with blues singer Lottie Kimbrough in the twenties. In 1923 and 1924, black performer Charles Anderson recorded eight sides for the Okeh label which gave a summary account of his vaudeville repertoire during the previous decade. Five of the recorded songs are yodels: "Sleep, Baby, Sleep", "Comic Yodle Song", "Coo Coo" (J K Emmett's "Cuckoo Song", adapted for Anderson's famous 60 second sustained soprano note), "Laughing Yodel" and "Roll on Silver Moon", a sentimental ballad, similar to Jimmie Rodgers' various Southern ballad recordings.

=== Jimmie Rodgers ===
The Singing Brakeman, Jimmie Rodgers, is credited with creating the American version of Alpine yodeling, the blue yodel. While working on the railroad Rogers learned blues techniques from African American gandy dancers (railroad workers), and eventually created his characteristic sound – a blend of traditional work, blues, hobo, and cowboy songs - his trademark "Blue Yodel." His first blue yodel, known as "Blue Yodel No. 1" (T For Texas), was recorded in the Trinity Baptist Church at Camden, New Jersey. When the song was released in February 1928 it became "a national phenomenon and generated an excitement and record-buying frenzy that no-one could have predicted".

According to a black musician who lived near Rodgers in Mississippi, everyone, both black and white alike, began to copy Rodgers: "Every one who could pick a guitar started yodeling like Rodgers." Standing on the Corner (Blue Yodel No. 9), released in 1930, was recorded with Louis Armstrong playing trumpet and Armstrong's wife Lil Hardin Armstrong playing the piano. Rodgers died in 1933. Many performers that followed him claimed that he had been a big influence in their singing style and career.

=== Cowboy yodelers ===
Although today's idea of the life and times of cowboys may not be completely accurate, the American cowboy is not a myth. At one time the American West was an open range with thousands of cattle that needed to be watched over, branded, and herded and rounded up and driven to slaughter houses. John Lomax recalls:

I couldn't have been more than 4 years old when I first heard a cowboy yodel and sing to his cattle. I was sleeping in my father's cabin in Texas. As the cowboys drove the cattle along, they sang, called and yodeled to them. ... They made up songs about trail life.

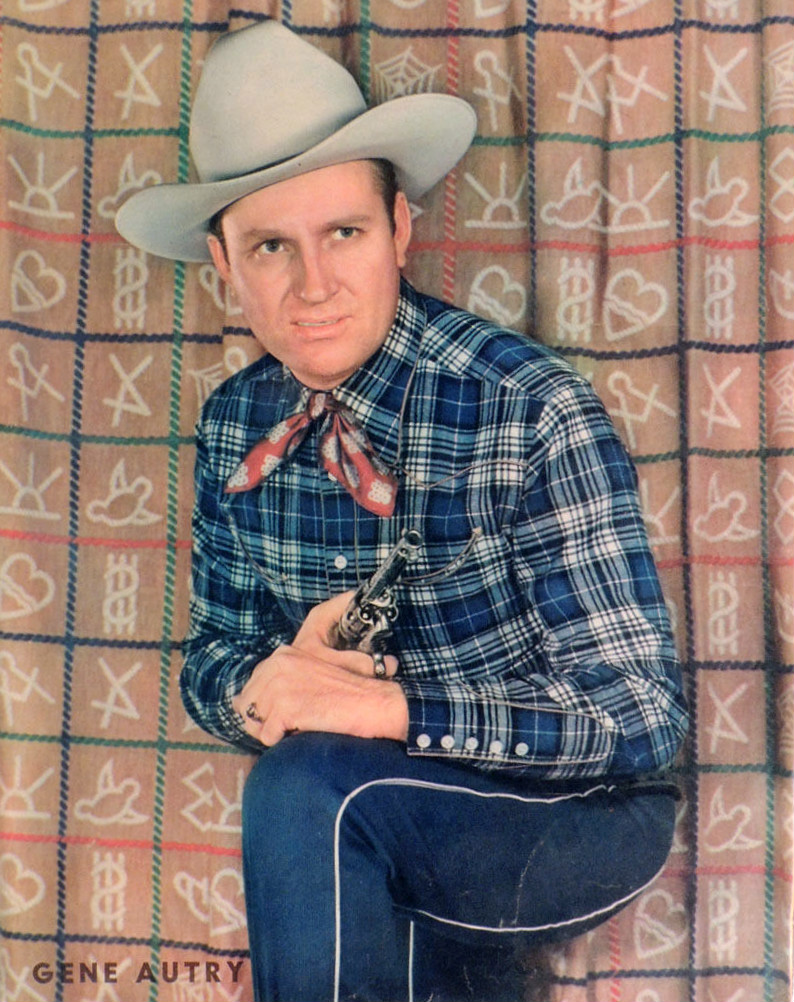
Gene Autry, with a variety of cattle brands displayed on backdrop c. 1942

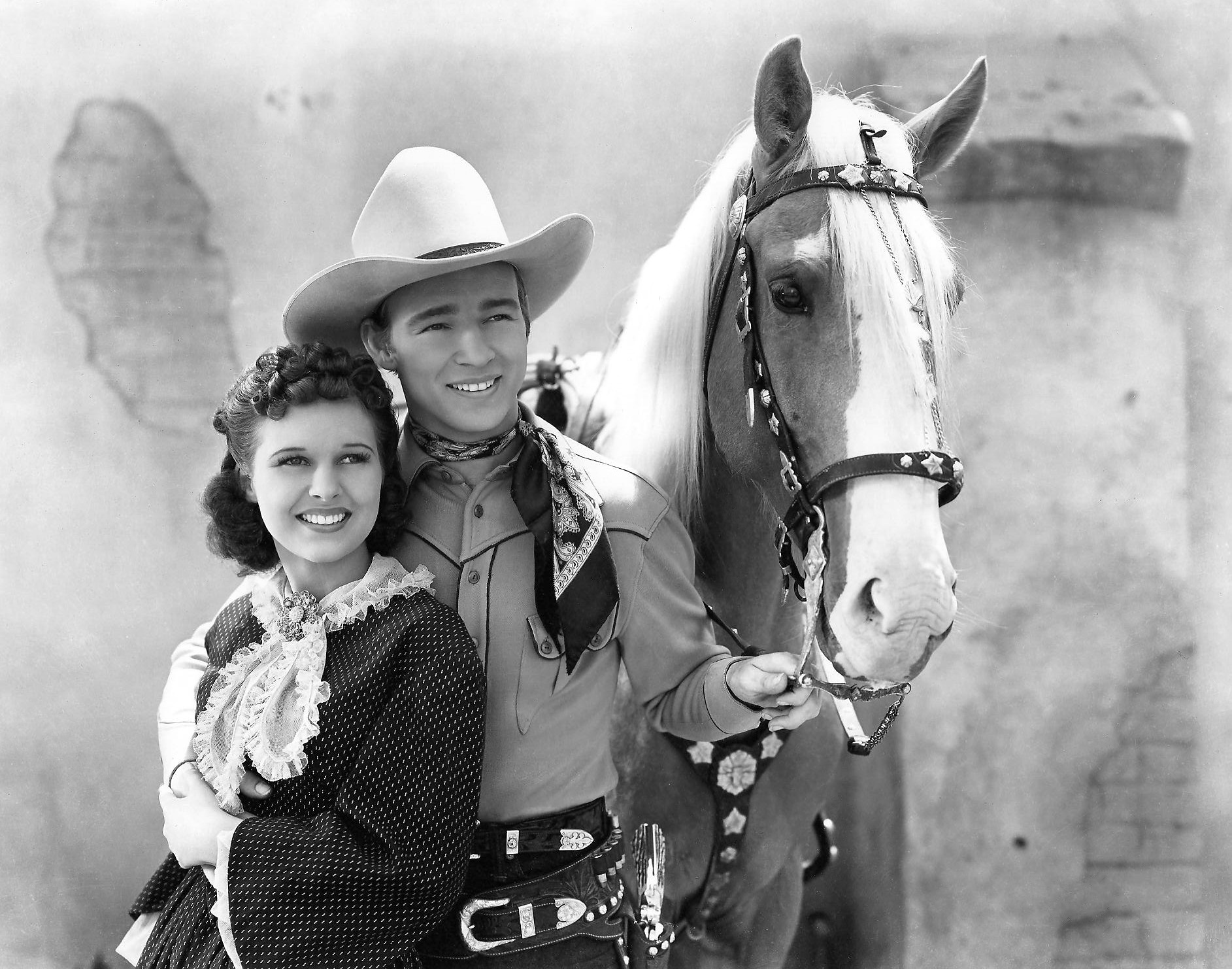
Lynne Roberts, Roy Rogers, and Trigger in Billy the Kid Returns, 1938

Music historian Timothy Wise writes that it was the mass media of the time; radio, phonograph, and film, that spread the romantic myth of the cowboy and "popular music was integral to the mass mediation of the idea and of the representation of the cowboy, and yodeling was one of its primary signifiers." The transformation of Rodgers' blue yodel to the cowboy yodel involved a change in both rhythm and a move away from Southern blues-type lyrics. Some yodels contained more of the Alpine type of yodel as well. Roy Rogers, singing with the Sons of the Pioneers in 1934, sings to a "sweet Tyrolean maid" in "A Swiss Yodel".

Jimmie Rodgers was the first to write and sing a cowboy yodel, "The Land of My Boyhood Dreams", in 1929. At that time he had moved to Texas and a publicity photograph of Rodgers wearing a cowboy outfit appears on one of the recordings he made with the Carter Family. Other country singers, who at that time were called "hillbilly" singers, quickly took on the cowboy image at least in part to escape the negative connotations of the hillbilly label. A Georgia radio station of that era lists "cowboy Roy Lykes", the "Yodeling Fence Rider" from Texas, in its 1934 roster. Lykes is described as "a real cowboy" who "wears regulation cowboy shoes to get him in the mood". Many of the old cowboy songs use a beat meant to signify the trot of a lonely cowboy riding his horse on the range. (Note: Horse-trot beat demonstrated by Elvis Presley singing Lonesome Cowboy. and by Slim Whitman singing That's How the Yodel Was Born..)

Without question the most famous singing cowboys are Gene Autry and Roy Rogers the King of the Cowboys. In the 1930s Rogers founded and sang in the group the Sons of the Pioneers "who through well-crafted romantic songs of the American west—often featuring three-part harmonized yodeling—created a new genre in early country music that was quite distinct from that of the so-called hillbillies."

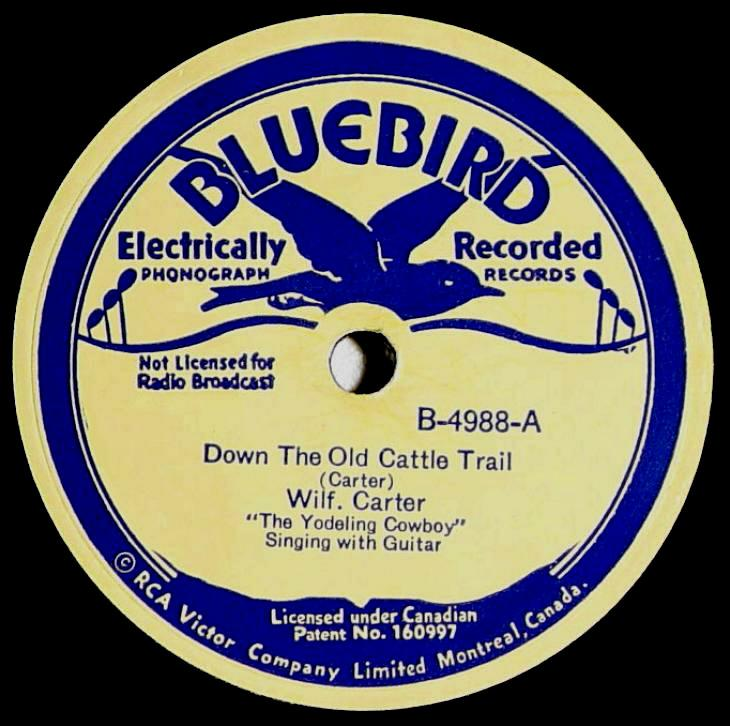
"Down the Old Cattle Trail" c. 1934

Canadian Wilf Carter (Montana Slim), known as the "Father of Canadian Country Music," is a good example of an early cowboy singer. He began singing in the 1920s after seeing a traveling Swiss performer named "The Yodeling Fool" in a nearby town. Carter sang in the "singing cowboy" style and developed a yodel with a Swiss-sound sometimes called an "echo yodel" or a "three-in-one."

Elton Britt is also considered to be one of the early cowboy yodelers. In 1934, he recorded what was to become his signature song, "Chime Bells." Like so many others of that era, Britt listened to records of Jimmie Rodgers, which inspired him to learn how to yodel. Eventually, he became renowned for his ability to sustain his yodel for an unusually long time, a skill he reportedly learned while swimming underwater for several minutes at a time.

Jack Guthrie, the cousin of Woody Guthrie, performed in the thirties and early forties. Known as "Oklahoma's Yodeling Cowboy", he developed a style of singing and yodeling influenced by his idol, Jimmie Rodgers, and his experiences as a bucking-horse rider and rodeo performer.

Known as the "Texas Drifter," Goebel Reeves claimed to have taught Jimmie Rodgers to yodel, which is doubtful. Reeves came from a middle-class background, but chose the life of a hobo. His most famous song, "Hobo's Lullaby," has been covered by numerous singers, notably Woody Guthrie and his son Arlo.

Zeke Clements, known as "The Dixie Yodeler" acted in "singing cowboy" Westerns and also provided the voice of Bashful, the yodeling dwarf, in Walt Disney's 1937 film Snow White And The Seven Dwarfs. Yodeler Hannes Schroll was the voice for the Goofy holler, a stock sound effect that is used frequently in Walt Disney cartoons and films. It is the cry Goofy makes when falling or being launched into the air, which could be transcribed as "yaaaaaaa-hoo-hoo-hooey!" "Yodelin' Slim Clark" hailed from Maine, and performed for 70 years. Yodeler Don Walser was from Texas. Though he was widely known in Texas, his singing career did not really take off until he was 60 years old in 1994. In 2000 he received a lifetime "Heritage" award from the National Endowment for the Arts, and he and his band played at the Kennedy Center for the Performing Arts. Jimmie Davis, who served two terms as the Governor of Louisiana, was also a successful country singer who yodeled.

Don Edwards (1939–2022) was a cowboy singer and guitarist and was an accomplished yodeler. He recorded several albums, two of which, Saddle Songs and Songs of the Cowboy, are included in the Folklore Archives of the Library of Congress. He was featured on the soundtrack of the 2005 documentary film Grizzly Man singing "Coyotes". The Great American Country network named "Coyotes" as one of their Top 20 Cowboy and Cowgirl Songs; and the members of the Western Writers of America chose it as one of the Top 100 Western songs of all time.

Other western music yodeling singers include Douglas B. Green (Ranger Doug) and Wylie Gustafson. Green sings with his band Riders in the Sky. He is also a music historian and has written a book, Singing in the Saddle, described as "the first comprehensive look at the singing cowboy phenomenon that swept the United States in the 1930s." Gustafson learned to yodel from his dad, who learned from Austrians on the ski team in Bozeman, Montana. In 2007, he released an instructional book and CD.

=== Cowgirl yodelers ===
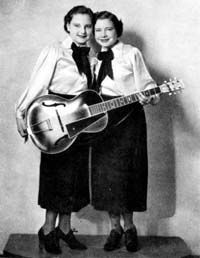
Carolyn and Mary Jane Dezurik, 1940

The DeZurik Sisters were two of the first women to become stars on both the National Barn Dance and the Grand Ole Opry, largely a result of their original yodeling style.

Carolina Cotton and Patsy Montana were also early cowgirl yodeling singers. Carolina Cotton (born Helen Hagstrom, 1925–1997) began to perform while still a youngster. Known as the Yodeling Blonde Bombshell, she went on to appear on radio shows, numerous Western movies, and early television. In the 1940s she sang with the Sons of the Pioneers; the only "daughter" of the group. In the 1950s when Westerns and Western Swing began to fall out of style, she returned to school and earned a master's degree in education and began a teaching career.

External audio
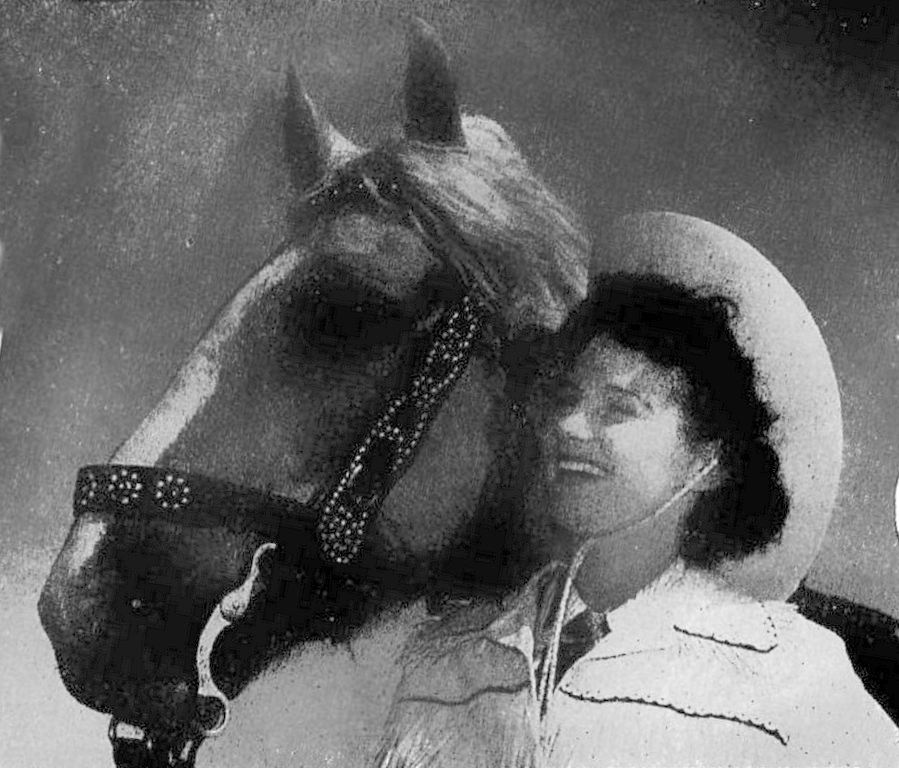
- "I Want to Be a Cowboy’s Sweetheart" , performed by Patsy Montana, Encyclopedia of Arkansas

Patsy Montana (born Ruby Rose Blevins, 1908 - 1996) was the first female country performer to have a million-selling single with her signature song "I Want to Be a Cowboy's Sweetheart", recorded in 1935. Members of the Western Writers of America chose it as one of the Top 100 Western songs of all time. In 2012, her record was added to the Library of Congress's National Recording Registry list of "culturally, historically, or aesthetically important" American sound recordings.

"Cowboy's Sweetheart" was again popularized in 1946 by Rosalie Allen, a "singing cowgirl" from Pennsylvania, who went on to host her own "western" radio show in New York City. Cowboy singer Betty Cody from Maine said she learned how to yodel by listening to Patsy Montana records. She had a hit record "Tom Tom Yodel" in 1952. Margo Smith, known as the Tennessee Yodler, covered it in the 1970s, and Suzy Bogguss released her version in 1988 where it peaked at #77 on the Hot Country Songs. Singer/yodeler LeAnn Rimes again brought the song back in the 1990s. Singing "Cowboy's Sweetheart" in 1997, Jessie James Decker won a Louisiana talent contest when she was only nine-years-old and singing the tune in 2006, 11 year-old Taylor Ware was the runner-up on the NBC show America's Got Talent. She taught herself to yodel and honed her skills by taking lessons from Margo Smith.

In 1996, Rimes also recorded "The Cattle Call", a "singing cowboy" song written by cowboy yodeler Tex Owens, with legendary singer Eddy Arnold. "The Cattle Call" was Arnold's signature song, but it has been recorded by many artists including Emmylou Harris and even Elvis Presley.

=== "The Lion Sleeps Tonight" ===
One famous yodeling tune known the world-over is the song "The Lion Sleeps Tonight", also known as "Wimoweh". It was first recorded by Solomon Linda and the Evening Birds in South Africa in 1939. Linda, a singer of Zulu origin, wrote the song, originally titled "Mbube" (Zulu: lion), while working for the Gallo Record Company as a cleaner and record packer. According to South African journalist Rian Malan:

"Mbube" wasn't the most remarkable tune, but there was something terribly compelling about the underlying chant, a dense meshing of low male voices above which Solomon yodeled and howled for two exhilarating minutes, occasionally making it up as he went along. The third take was the great one, but it achieved immortality only in its dying seconds, when Solly took a deep breath, opened his mouth and improvised the melody that the world now associates with these words:

"In the jungle, the mighty jungle, the lion sleeps tonight".

By 1948, the song had sold about 100,000 copies in Africa and among black South African immigrants in the United Kingdom and had lent its name to a style of African a cappella music that evolved into isicathamiya (also called mbube), popularized by Ladysmith Black Mambazo. It was covered internationally by many 1950s pop and folk revival artists, including The Weavers, Jimmy Dorsey, Yma Sumac, Miriam Makeba, and The Kingston Trio. In 1961, it became a number one hit in the U.S. as adapted by the doo-wop group The Tokens and in 1982 as a number one hit in the UK for Tight Fit. It went on to earn at least 15 million US dollars in royalties from covers and film licensing. Then, in the mid-1990s, it became a pop "supernova" when it was used in the film The Lion King, its spin-off TV series and live musical. From 2006 until the Mbube copyright expired, the earnings of the derivative Wimoweh song were paid into a trust for Solomon Linda's family.

=== The Tarzan yell ===
The Tarzan yell is the yodel-like call of the character Tarzan, as portrayed by actor Johnny Weissmuller in the films based on the character created by Edgar Rice Burroughs, starting with Tarzan the Ape Man (1932). The yell was a creation of the movies, based on what Burroughs described in his books as "the victory cry of the bull ape." Carol Burnett has been associated with the Tarzan yell ever since doing it on her TV show that started in 1967 and ran for 11 years. This link from the Larry King Now show describes how she came to do it Carol Burnett on how the Tarzan yell started.

=== Radio ===
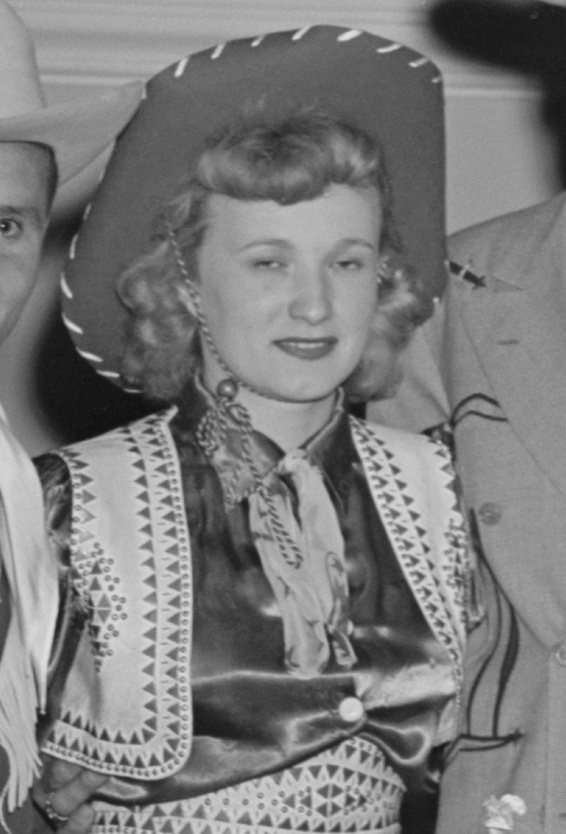
Rosalie Allen, a "singing cowgirl" from Pennsylvania, who went on to host her own "western" radio show in New York City c. 1947

Other than the National Barn Dance, broadcast out of Chicago starting in 1924, and the Grand Ole Opry in 1925, American Country Western performers had only live performances and records to promote their music. When radio grew in popularity in the late 1920s and early 1930s, the powerful recording company RCA Victor feared that free music would devastate their record business. RCA first attempted to prevent artists from appearing on the radio and then successfully stopped the growth of more powerful FM stations. But radio ownership grew from two out of five U.S. homes in 1931 to four out of five homes in 1938, and stations began to broadcast live shows featuring various artists, sometimes with a live audience. Some artists remained in their home area, but many traveled a circuit covering dozens of low-power AM stations throughout the country, introducing the various styles of singing to others outside of their region.

== Notable performers ==
=== United States ===
Jimmie Davis was a singer and songwriter, and served two terms as the governor of Louisiana. Singing on a local radio station, his early work was in the style of country music singer Jimmie Rodgers. Like Rodgers, he was influenced by African-American blues music and discovering its rich use of sexual double meanings, he wrote some of his own tunes such as "Tom Cat and Pussy Blues" and "Organ Grinder Blues". In his first run for governor his opponent tried to use some of his old work against him by playing it at a rally, but instead the crowds cheered for it and began dancing. On a week-end fishing trip, he and Hank Williams composed the Williams recording titled "(I Heard That) Lonesome Whistle".

Cliff Carlisle, GoodbyeOldPal c. 1936

Blue yodeler Cliff Carlisle was one of the most prolific recording artists of the 1930s, and a pioneer in the use of the Hawaiian steel guitar in country music. He frequently released songs with sexual connotations including barnyard metaphors (which became something of a trademark).

Hank Snow was one of the great country legends of the 1950s, but he had actually been singing in Canada for years where he was known as "The Yodeling Ranger". He admired Jimmie Rodgers as well, and learned to yodel by listening to his records. He even named his son Jimmie Rodgers Snow.

Tommy Duncan, vocalist for "Bob Wills and His Texas Playboys", was a good yodeler. (See the sound file with Duncan singing Rodger's "Blue Yodel No. 1" in 1937) Bob Wills is considered by music authorities to be the co-founder of Western Swing.

In 1949, Hank Williams recorded his first hit song "Lovesick Blues", first recorded by Emmett Miller in 1928. Williams was familiar with Miller's recording and first performed his version, replacing the jazz musicians with his own country music band but retaining Miller's yodel, in an appearance on The Louisiana Hayride. His recording became an overnight success, quickly reaching number one on Billboard's music charts. Singer Patsy Cline could yodel. She released her version of "Lovesick Blues" in 1960.

Perhaps yodeler Bill Haley, of Bill Haley and the Comets, has one of the strangest histories of all. Haley zoomed to fame as the "King of Rock and Roll" when his song "Rock Around the Clock" was featured in the popular film Blackboard Jungle in 1955, but it was little known that Haley and his band had been touring for years, performing Western swing music with Haley featured as a yodeler. Haley had been born in 1925, and in 1955, when "Rock Around the Clock" initially charted, he and his band were using the name the Comets. However, prior to that time they had gone under the names the Down Homers, the Texas Range Riders, the Four Aces of Western Swing, and finally, The Saddlemen. At one point in the 1940s, Haley was even awarded Indiana State Yodeling Champion for his skill; this might have been a fact that his skillful manager, Colonel Tom Parker, felt not important to mention to his screaming teenage rock 'n' roll fans.

Yodeler Kenny Roberts was another member of the Down Homers; he had taught Bill Haley to yodel before he did a stint in the Navy when Haley took his place in the band. In later years Roberts was popular on children's TV shows where he used to leap over two feet in the air while playing guitar and yodeling.

Otis Dewey "Slim" Whitman performed for over 60 years. Whitman avoided the "down on yer luck" songs, preferring instead to sing laid-back romantic melodies about simple life and love. Critics dubbed his musical style "countrypolitan," due to its fusion of country music and a more sophisticated crooner vocal style. Pop singer Michael Jackson cited Whitman as one of his ten favorite vocalists. Beatles George Harrison and Paul McCartney cite Whitman as an early influence In the film Mars Attacks!, a Kansas teenager discovers that the Martians are vulnerable to Whitman's song "Indian Love Call," whereupon he and his grandmother use it to destroy the Martians.

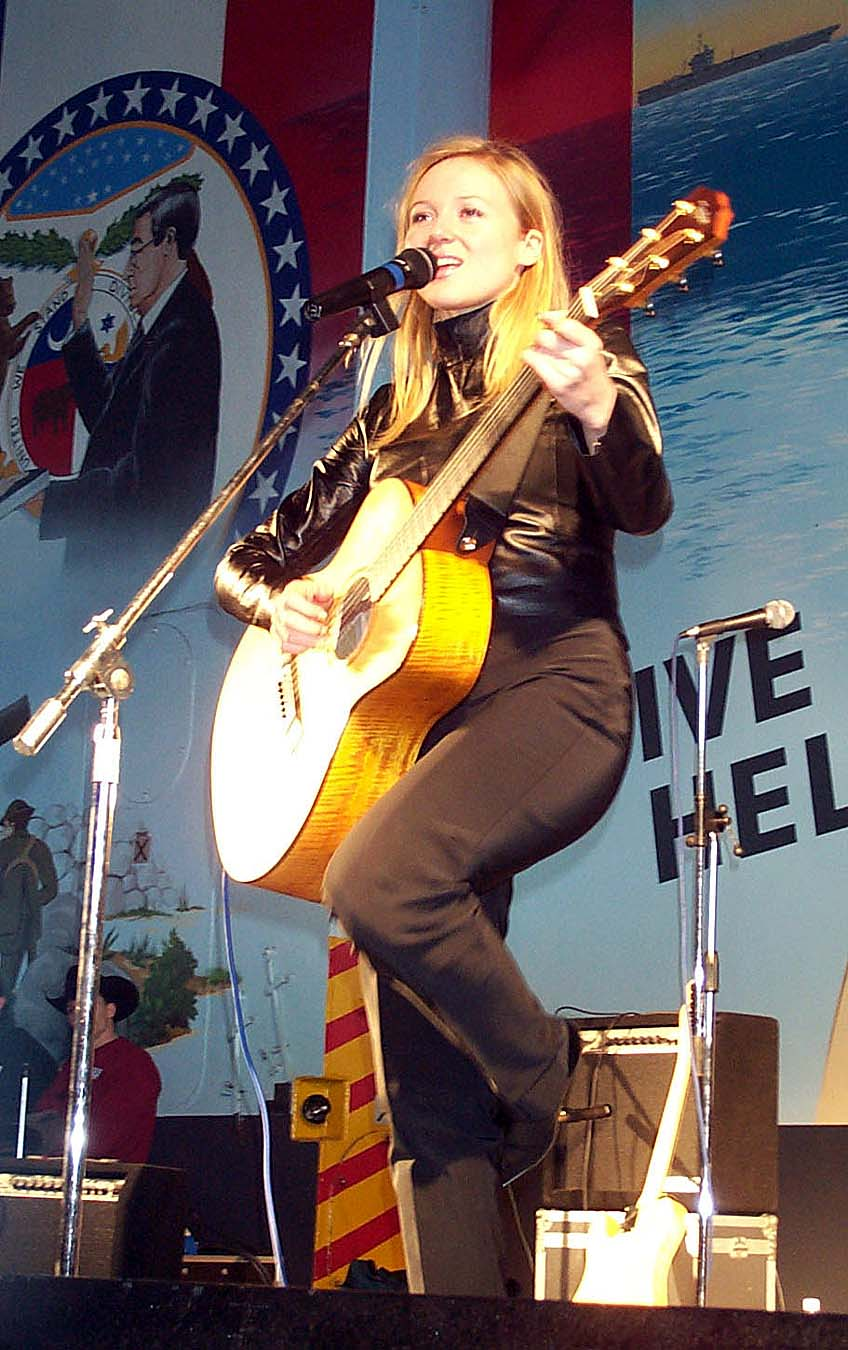
Jewel performing for US troops in 2000

Janet McBride grew up in Maine where she began to yodel while still a child. She continued to sing and record, writing some of her own music, for over 40 years. She has toured in the U.S. and in Austria. McBride was awarded Western Music Association's Female Yodeler of the Year in 1991.

Swiss-American folk and country singer Jewel Kilcher yodels, and is known for her version of "Chime Bells". Jewel says that she learned to yodel from her father, Attila Kuno "Atz" Kilcher, who himself also learned to yodel by listening to Jimmie Rodgers.

Mike Johnson is an African American yodeler who combines the Jimmie Rodgers, Swiss, and Cowboy yodeling styles. In 2007, 114 of his yodeling songs were inducted into the Recorded Sound Reference Center's permanent music collection in the Library of Congress in Washington D.C.

Jazz singer Leon Thomas, best known for his work with Pharoah Sanders, particularly the 1969 song "The Creator Has a Master Plan" from Sanders's Karma album, was known to break out into yodeling in the middle of a vocal. Thomas said he learned to yodel from listening to African Pygmy singers. This style has influenced singers James Moody, Tim Buckley and Bobby McFerrin, among others.

Kerry Christensen, originally from Idaho, has been performing since the age of three. He yodels in both Western and Alpine styles, plays the accordion, zither, alphorn and is very good at imitating chickens.

Yodeler Taylor Ware was a contestant on America's Got Talent when she was eleven years old. According to Ware, she taught herself to yodel from an audiotape and instruction book when she was seven years old. Alyse Eady, who holds the title of Miss Arkansas 2010 and was 1st runner-up in the Miss America 2011 Pageant, both yodeled and did ventriloquism in the song "I Want to Be a Cowboy's Sweetheart" as her talent performance.

According to Bart Plantenga, author of Yodel-Ay-Ee-Oooo: The Secret History of Yodeling Around the World, "... unlikely yodellers include the Muppets (with, of course, special guest Julie Andrews), Shakira, Goofy, Bill Murray (remember Charlie's Angels?), Gene Wilder (who was taught to yodel by Rough Guide contributor and yodel legend Kenny Roberts), and South Korea's former Miss World Ji-Yea Park."

The Sound of Music, one of Rodgers's and Hammerstein's best-known collaborations, contains a yodelling song, "The Lonely Goatherd," in which Mary Martin yodelled to good effect in the original production on Broadway in 1959. Julie Andrews was similarly effective in the 1965 film version, with the same song. Gwen Stefani also yodeled in the 2006 single "Wind It Up". The lead vocalist for American electro-punk band the Epoxies is also known for her yodeling in a lot of their songs. Soul singer Aaron Neville said he was inspired by Gene Autry's yodelling to develop his unusual vibrato singing style.

In a sketch that aired on the TV "Late Night with Jimmy Fallon," the actor Brad Pitt and Jimmy Fallon engaged in a yodeling conversation atop New York City skyscrapers. As they yodeled back and forth, subtitles inform viewers of what they are saying to each another. After some small talk, Pitt asks Fallon if he'd like to try a "double yodel." Fallon responds, "A double yodel? But that's never been done before!" The episode concludes with the two yodeling in harmony.

In April 2018, eleven-year-old Mason Ramsey, from Golconda, Illinois, was caught on camera yodeling the Hank Williams hit "Lovesick Blues" in a Walmart store. Within a few days, videos of his performance collectively garnered over 25 million views and he became a viral sensation and Internet meme. Ramsey's performance sparked new interest in Hank Williams 70 year-old recording of the song and, in March, Rolling Stone reported that Spotify's Viral 50 chart for the U.S. ranked Hank William's "Lovesick Blues" at Number Three, and Number Four around the globe. The Wikipedia views of their "Yodeling" article jumped from a few hundred to over 5,000 a day. As a result of his newfound fame Ramsey made an appearance on the Ellen DeGeneres Show. Saying that his dream was to appear on Grand Ole Opry one day, DeGeneres surprised Ramsey by saying he had been booked for the following weekend.

=== Canada ===
Canadian country singer and yodeler Donn Reynolds set a world record yodelling non-stop for 7 hours and 29 minutes in 1976. Reynolds later established a world record for the fastest 5 tone yodel (3 falsetto) in 1.9 seconds in 1984. His release of the yodelling song "She Taught Me How To Yodel" reached #2 on the Canadian country music charts in 1965.

Stompin' Tom Connors of Canada is also noted for yodeling in some of his songs.

Rod Erickson born in Beaverlodge, Alberta is also a well known yodeller. His first release after signing with MGM was "She Taught Me How To Yodel" which reached the top ten worldwide within a month. The only yodel song to ever go top ten worldwide. Some of Erickson's other chart toppers include "Yodel Sweet Molly", "Cannonball Yodel" and "Cattle Call." In 1976 his song "Going Home" went top in Canada, a first for a country song in Canada.

=== Europe ===
Yodeling is a major feature of folk music (Volksmusik) from Switzerland, Austria, and southern Germany and can be heard in many contemporary folk songs, which are also featured on regular TV broadcasts. Stefanie Hertel is a German yodeler and popular performer of Alpine folk music. Hertel has won numerous prizes as a performer; in 1992, she won the Grand Prix der Volksmusik with the song "Über jedes Bacherl geht a Brückerl".

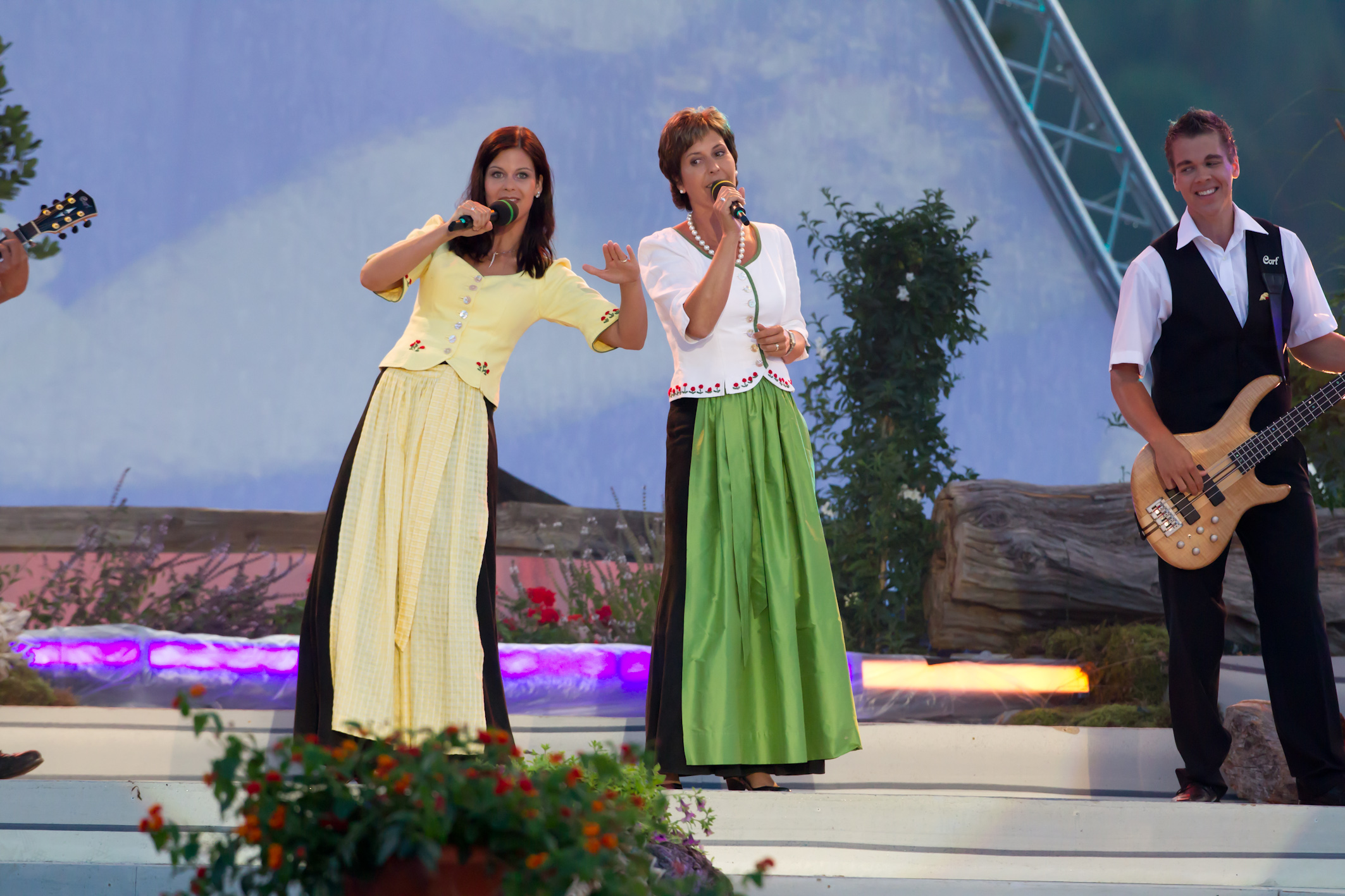
Oesch's die Dritten's lead vocalist and yodeler Melanie (left), with her mother and singer Anne-Marie (centre) and brother and electric bass guitarist Mike (right)

Franz "Franzl" Lang, known as the Yodelking (German: Jodlerkönig), was a famous yodeler from Bavaria. Lang also played the guitar and the accordion and he authored several books on yodeling. Ursprung Buam is an Austrian folk music trio from Zillertal, Tyrol. One of the most popular touring groups in Austria, Ursprung Buam often tours Germany and many places across the European Union, as well as the Tirolean festival scene. Oesch’s die Dritten is a Yodel Volksmusik family group from the Bernese Oberland, Switzerland.

Bobbejaan Schoepen was a versatile Belgian entertainer, entrepreneur, singer-songwriter, guitarist, comedian, actor, and professional whistler. In 1948, "De Jodelende Fluiter" ("The Yodeling Whistler") was Schoepen's first hit. In 1953, he was one of the first Europeans to appear at the "Grand Ole Opry" in the United States. Outside of regional Volksmusic, Karl Denver was a Scottish singer who had a series of yodel-based hit singles in the early 1960s. Most famous of these was a 1961 version of "Wimoweh".

Harry Hopkinson (1902–1979) has been credited as one of the world's greatest yodelers. He used the stage name Harry Torrani and was billed as the "Yodeling Cowboy from Chesterfield". Frank Ifield, an Australian-English singer, released a double A-sided single record, "Lovesick Blues" and "She Taught Me How to Yodel" in the UK in 1962. It reached number 1 in the UK charts, and also reached number 44 in the U.S. Billboard Hot 100.

In England, Edith Sitwell featured a "Jodelling Song" as part of her series of poems Façade, set to music by William Walton.

An unusual marriage between yodeling and rock music was portrayed in "Hocus Pocus" by the Dutch band Focus released in 1971.

Irish singer Dolores O'Riordan was renowned for her "natural" Celtic yodeling particularly in tracks such as "Dreams", one of several O'Riordan-penned singles from the five-times RIAA certified platinum album, Everybody Else Is Doing It, So Why Can't We? by the Cranberries. It can also be heard on most of O'Riordan's songs, especially on "I Can't Be with You", and "Zombie", the lead single from the seven-times RIAA certified platinum album, No Need to Argue. O'Riordan continued to incorporate her trademark yodeling in works throughout her career, as in the song "Black Widow" which appears on her solo album Are You Listening?. Author Bart Plantenga wrote, "Dolores O'Riordan's voice is truly unique, to the point that, as with throat singers, you want to dissect her throat to inspect the physiological source of her enchanting yet discomfiting yodel-inflected vocals".

The song "Yodel It!" from Ilinca Băcilă and Alex Florea represented Romania in the Eurovision Song Contest 2017, reaching seventh place. The track musically portrays a mixture between yodeling, rap, rock, pop and hip hop music, featuring Ilinca yodeling through the chorus. "Yodel It!" was originally thought for Swiss band Timebelle, but was then handed to Ilinca to record; Florea was ultimately chosen as a featuring artist for a better quality.

In Spain, the band El Pony Pisador uses yodel mixed with Irish music and bluegrass to create new sonorities.

=== Outside Europe and North America ===
Kishore Kumar was a playback singer from India, famous for his yodeling, while it was JP Chandrababu talented comedian of Tamil film who introduced yodeling as playback singing in India.

Australia's first singing cowboy, Smoky Dawson, was well known for his western-style yodel and featured yodel on his first single, "I'm A Happy Go-Lucky Cowhand". In South Africa, yodeling is featured in some Afrikaans-language pop music.

Joy McKean, Australian country music singer-songwriter, is known as the "grand lady" of Australian country music. By the age of 18 she was performing with her sister Heather on their own radio show as the McKean Sisters, noted for their yodeling harmonies. Mckean performed with her husband Slim Dusty till his death in 2003. Slim, a singer-songwriter and yodeler as well, wrote his first song, "The Way the Cowboy Dies" when he was only 10 years old. He received 37 Golden Guitar and two ARIA awards and was inducted into the ARIA Hall of Fame.

Mary Schneider is an Australian singer and performer who yodels the works of classic composers. She mainly appears in club and pub venues around Australia as well as overseas, but she has also performed at many arena venues. Her daughter Melinda Schneider is also a country music singer and yodeller.

Takeo Ishii (石井 健雄, Ishii Takeo; born 1947), Germanized as Ischi, is a Japanese yodeler active in Germany. While in college Ischi taught himself to yodel by listening to the recordings of Franzl Lang and he began to perform on Japanese television. While studying in Germany Lang took him "under his wing" and he began to sing at a beer hall in Zurich. Ischi met his wife Henriette in 1981 and proposed to her at an onsen (hot spring) in Japan, where he yodeled his proposal to her.

Taiwanese singer Harlem Yu has one song that uses yodeling (山頂黑狗兄).

== See also ==
- Andachtsjodler, Austrian devotional yodel
- Blue yodeling
- Cooee
- Field holler
- Jodeldiplom
- Kulning
- Old-time music
- Singing cowboy
- Tahrir (vocal technique)
- Tarzan yell
- Ululation
- Western music (North America)
- Western swing
- Zäuerli
