= Andachtsjodler =

Bavarian-Austrian yodeling Christmas song

Andachtsjodler
Musik: Südtirol, trad.; Tondatei: Rabanus Flavus

The Andachtsjodler ('devotional yodel'), also called Sterzinger Andachtsjodler, Mettenjodler, Rauhnachtjodler, or Jodlerandacht is an untexted spiritual yodeling song which originated in the Christmas mass of the South Tyrol in Austria. Today it is performed in both liturgical and secular contexts, especially in Bavarian-Austrian folk music.

== History ==
The folklorist Friedrich Haider opined that the yodel in its present form came into being at the end of the 18th or beginning of the 19th century. Records state that the song was still sung in 1830 at Christmas mass in Sterzing (South Tyrol) as an annex to a shepherd's song (Christmas carol).

According to Konrad Fischnaler, it was still heard there in 1850 from the Holy Ghost hole during the Transubstantiation.

It appeared at the onset of Cecilianism but soon became largely forgotten. It was rediscovered by the Berlin high school teacher Max Pohl (1869–1928) within the Wandervogel movement. Annette Thoma used the yodel in her 1933 composition Deutsche Bauernmesse. The 'Salzburg Advent Singing' (Salzburger Adventsingen) also contributed to the yodel's popularity, as it is sung by both the participants and the audience.

== Score and chant ==
The notation follows the two-part version by folksong researcher Karl Liebleitner (1858–1942) from 1921, which corresponds to the Sterzing variant. According to Friedrich Haider, there are also other variants from the Pflerschtal (from Gossensaß westwards) and the Pfitscher Tal (from Sterzing eastwards).

== Performance ==
In more recent times, the devotional yodel is usually performed in three voices, often with instrumental accompaniment. (Note: See for example: three-part setting with harp accompaniment.)

In some releases, the traditional yodeling lyrics are followed by a newly added four-stanza poem of unknown author.

It is unclear whether this additional text should be sung to the yodel melody or whether it has its own melody. In the "Liederkiste", a free online songbook, it is referred to as "Alternative Text".

Male choirs sometimes sing it in four parts to the yodel melody.

=== Poem example ===
Heut' in der Nacht
Hab' ich hoch am Berg gewacht,
Denn dort droben kann ich sein
Mit dem Herrgott ganz allein.

Heut' in der Nacht
Hab' ich hoch am Berg gedacht:
Unsere Welt wär' öd und leer
Wenn der Herrgott nicht wär.

Heut' in der Nacht
Hab' mein Herz ich aufgemacht,
Hab' dem Herrgott erzählt
Von dem Jammer auf der Welt.

Heut' in der Nacht
Hat er freundlich Trost mir 'bracht.
Drunten ruht das stille Tal
Droben Sternlein ohne Zahl.

Tonight
I kept watch high on the mountain,
because up there I can be
all alone with the Lord God.

Tonight
I thought high on the mountain:
Our world would be desolate and empty
If it wasn't for the Lord God.

Tonight
I opened my heart,
I told the Lord God about
the misery in the world.

Tonight
he kindly brought me comfort.
Below rests the quiet valley
up there little stars without number.

== Literature ==
- Karl, Werner, ed. (1974). Liederbuch für Bergsteiger (in German) (2nd ed.). Münich: Bergverlag Rother. p. 189. ISBN 3-7633-8006-X.
- Pauli, Keim (2001). Alte Oberbayerische Volkslieder (in German). Köln: Parkland. p. 294. ISBN 3-89340-002-8.
- Mantinger, Brigette (2007). "Der Andachsjodler" (in German). Vierteltakt: Das Kommunikationsinstrument des Oberösterreichischen Volksliedwerkes. 3: pp. 2.7–2.11 – via Forum oö Geschichte
- Schmidkunz, Walter; List, Karl; Fanderl, Wastl; eds. (1979). Das Leibhaftige Liederbuch: Alpenländische Liedersammlung (in German). Wolfenbüttel: Möseler. p. 41. ISBN 9783787710508.
