= Oesch's die Dritten =

Swiss yodel volksmusik group

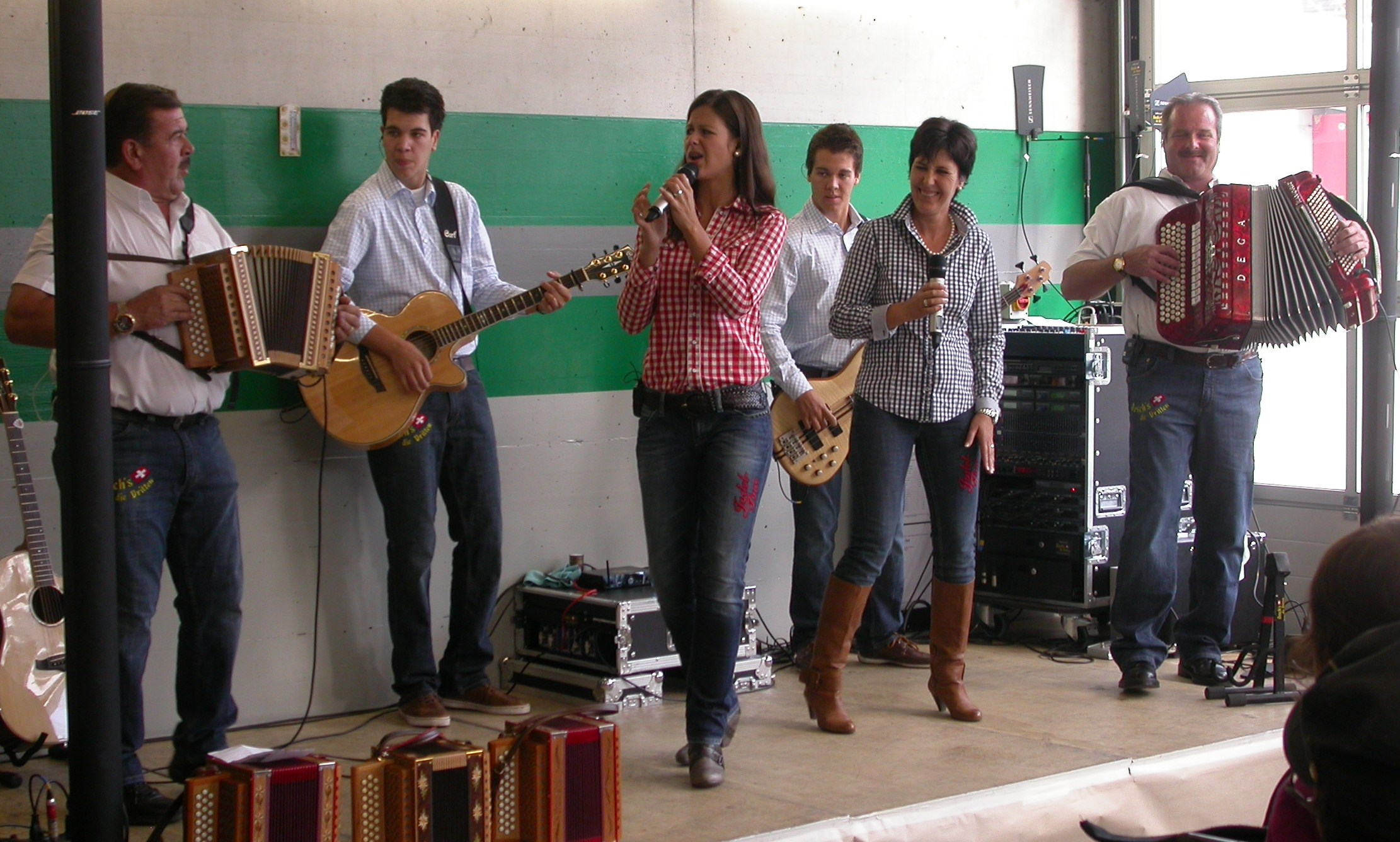
- From left to right: Hansueli, Kevin, Melanie, Mike and Annemarie Oesch, and Urs Meier

Background information
- Origin: Bernese Oberland, Switzerland
- Genres: Volksmusik
- Years active: 1997–present
- Members: Melanie Oesch; Annemarie Oesch; Hansueli Oesch; Mike Oesch; Kevin Oesch; Urs Meier; Heinz Haldi
- Website: oeschs-die-dritten.ch

Oesch's die Dritten is a yodel volksmusik family group from the Bernese Oberland, Switzerland. It consists of its lead vocalist and yodeler Melanie Oesch (born 14 December 1987), her mother Annemarie (born 8 February 1963), her father Hansueli (born 1958), her two brothers Mike (born 1989), Kevin (born 1990), Urs Meier (born 1980) and Heinz Haldi.

The words die Dritten refer to the third generation, after grandfather Hans and parents Hansueli and Annemarie.

== Group members ==
- Melanie Oesch – lead vocalist and yodeler
- Annemarie Oesch – singer
- Hansueli Oesch – Schwyzerörgeli
- Mike Oesch – Electric Bass guitar
- Kevin Oesch – acoustic guitar
- Urs Meier – accordion
- Heinz Haldi - accordion

== Discography ==
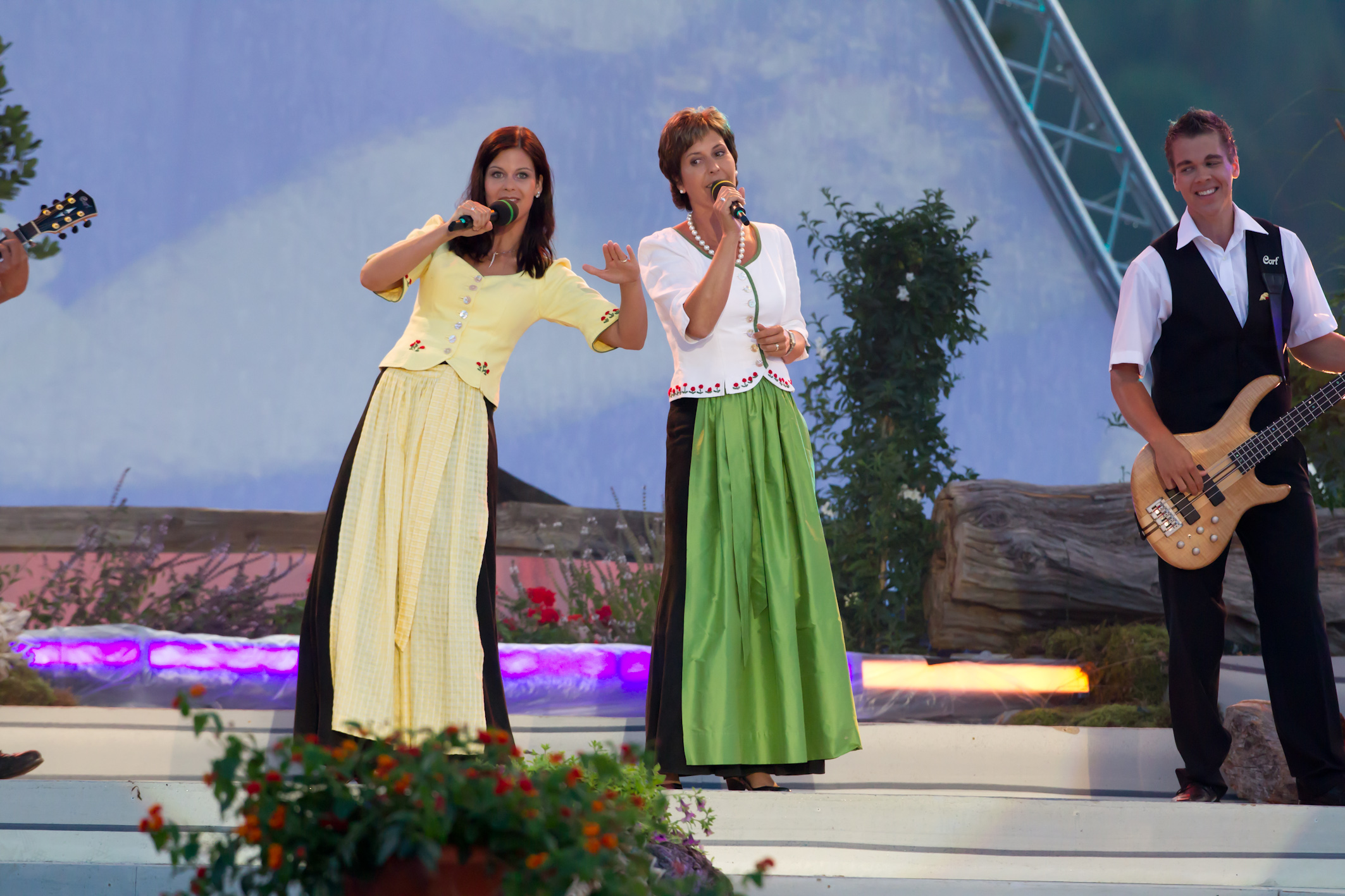
The yodeling singer Melanie Oesch (left), with her mother Annemarie and brother Mike

=== Albums ===
Year	Title	Peak chart positions		
Year	Title	SWI	AUT	GER
1998	Mit neuem Power (as Trio Oesch and Oesch's die Dritten)	–	–	–
2003	SMS – Schweizer–Music–Sowieso	–	–	–
2007	Jodelzauber	22	–	–
2008	Frech – Frisch – Jodlerisch	18	74	–
2009	Volksmusik ist international	16	–	–
2009	Winterpracht	63	–	–
2011	Jodel-Time	24	–	–
2012	Unser Regenbogen	22	–	–
2014	Wurzeln und Flügel	6	–	–
2016	Jodelzirkus	5	–	80
2018	Vätu's Wunschliste – Zum 60. Geburtstag	3	–	–
2020	Die Reise Geht Weiter	4	–	–
2022	25 Jahre Oesch's die Dritten – Es Fescht	2		
2025	Händmade	3		

Live albums

Year	Title	Peak chart positions
Year	Title	SWI
2013	Live ... unsere grössten Hits	32

=== EPs ===
Year	Title	Peak chart positions
Year	Title	SWI
2012	Die stille Zeit ruft	–

=== Singles ===
Year	Title	Peak chart positions
Year	Title	SWI
2007	"Ku-Ku Jodel"	28
2008	"Die Jodelsprache"	–
2013	"Da Da Muh!"	–
2015	"Zirkusjodel"	–
