= Salzburg Stories =

- Poster
- Directed by: Kurt Hoffmann
- Written by: Erich Kästner (novel Der kleine Grenzverkehr); Kurt Hoffmann
- Produced by: Georg Witt
- Starring: Marianne Koch; Paul Hubschmid; Peter Mosbacher
- Cinematography: Werner Krien
- Edited by: Eva Kroll
- Music by: Franz Grothe
- Production company: Georg Witt-Film
- Distributed by: Constantin Film
- Release date: 25 January 1957
- Running time: 90 minutes
- Country: West Germany
- Language: German

Salzburg Stories (German: Salzburger Geschichten) is a 1957 West German romantic comedy film directed by Kurt Hoffmann and starring Marianne Koch, Paul Hubschmid and Peter Mosbacher. It was shot at the Bavaria Studios in Munich. The film's sets were designed by the art director Ludwig Reiber.

== Cast ==
- Marianne Koch as Konstanze
- Paul Hubschmid as Georg
- Peter Mosbacher as Karl
- Richard Romanowsky as Leopold
- Adrienne Gessner as Karoline
- Eva Maria Meineke as Emily
- Helmuth Lohner as Franz
- Frank Holms as Bob
- Anneliese Egerer as Mizzi
- Otto Storr as Mr. Namarra
- Michl Lang as Bootsführer auf dem Königssee
- Claire Reigbert as Mrs. Namarra
- Franzl Lang as Jodler
- Liesl Karlstadt as Vroni
- Franz-Otto Krüger as Hotelmanager
- Theodor Danegger as Kellner
- Karl Hanft as Ferdl
- Petra Unkel
- José Held as Pianist
- Vera Complojer as Marktfrau

== See also ==
- A Salzburg Comedy (1943)

== Bibliography ==
- Bock, Hans-Michael & Bergfelder, Tim. The Concise CineGraph. Encyclopedia of German Cinema. Berghahn Books, 2009.
