= Appenzell =

Historical canton of Switzerland

Coordinates: 47.3461°N 9.3419°E

Canton Appenzell Land Appenzell
- 1403–1597
- Flag Coat of arms
- Capital: Appenzell
- History
  - Rebelled against the Abbot of St. Gallen: May 1403
  - Alliance with most of the Old Swiss Confederacy: 24 November 1411
  - Associate member of the Swiss Confederacy: 15 November 1452
  - Full member of the Swiss Confederacy: 17 December 1513
  - Partitioned: 8 September 1597
Preceded by	Succeeded by
Abbey of St. Gallen	Appenzell Innerrhoden; Appenzell Ausserrhoden

Appenzell (German pronunciation: [ˈapn̩ˌtsɛl]) was a canton in the northeast of Switzerland, and entirely surrounded by the canton of St. Gallen, in existence from 1403 to 1597.

Appenzell became independent of the Abbey of Saint Gall in 1403 and entered a league with the Old Swiss Confederacy in 1411, becoming a full member in 1513. It was divided into Appenzell Innerrhoden and Appenzell Ausserrhoden in 1597 (in a process called the Landteilung) as a result of the Swiss Reformation.

The territory of Appenzell as a geographical entity is known as Appenzellerland. In political contexts, the two cantons (until 1999 half-cantons) are referred to as beide Appenzell ('both Appenzells').

== History ==
=== Foundation ===
Seasonal rotation of herding to higher or lower pastures in Appenzell

The name Appenzell derives from Latin: abbatis cella 'cell (i.e., estate) of the abbot'. This refers to the Abbey of St. Gall, which exerted a great influence on the area. By the middle of the 11th century, the abbots of St Gall had established their power in the land later called Appenzell, which by that time was thoroughly Alemannic.

By about 1360, conflicts over grazing rights, taxes, and tithes were causing concern for both the abbot and the farmers of Appenzell. Both parties wanted to protect their rights and interests by joining the new Swabian League. In 1377 Appenzell was allowed to join the League with the support of the cities of Konstanz and St. Gallen (the city of St. Gallen was often at odds with the neighboring Abbey of St. Gall). With the support of the League, Appenzell refused to pay many of the gifts and tithes that the Abbot Kuno von Stoffeln demanded. In response to the loss of revenue from his estates, Kuno approached the Austrian House of Habsburg for help. In 1392 he made an agreement with the Habsburgs, which was renewed in 1402. In response, in 1401 Appenzell entered into an alliance with the city of St. Gallen to protect their rights and freedom.

=== Independence and joining the Swiss Confederation ===
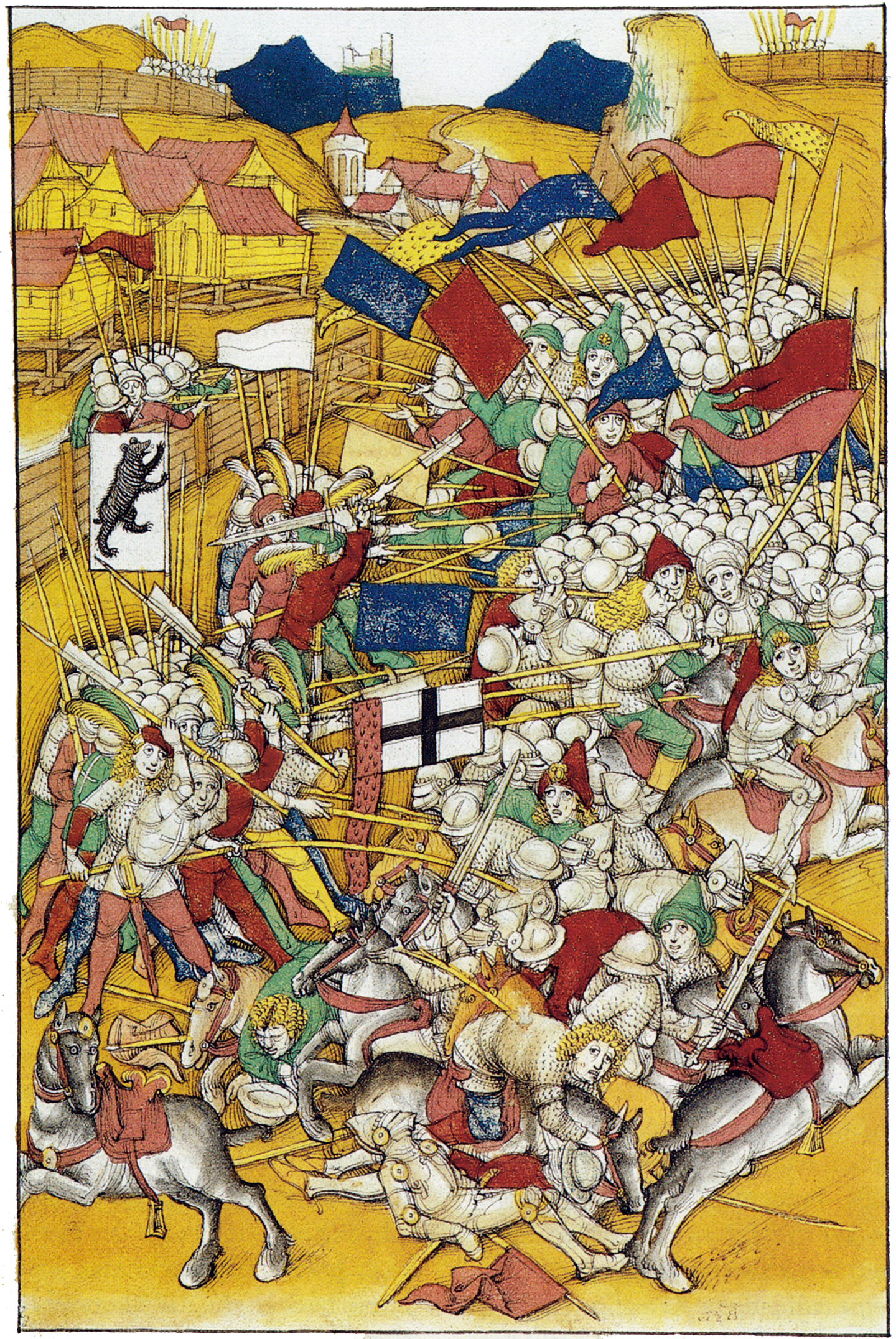
Battle of Vögelinsegg

Following increasing conflicts between the Appenzellers and the abbot's agents, including the bailiff of Appenzell demanding that a dead body be dug up because he wanted the man's clothes, the Appenzellers planned an uprising. On a certain day, throughout the abbot's lands, they attacked the bailiffs and drove them out of the land. Following unsuccessful negotiations, Appenzell and St. Gallen entered into a treaty. The treaty between St. Gallen and Appenzell marked a break between the abbot and his estates. Perhaps fearing the Habsburgs, in 1402 the League expelled Appenzell. During the same year, St. Gallen reached an agreement with the abbot and Appenzell could no longer count on St. Gallen's support. Appenzell declared itself ready to stand against the abbot, and in 1403 formed an alliance with the Canton of Schwyz, a member of the Old Swiss Confederation that had defeated the Austrians in the last century. Glarus provided less support, but authorized any citizen who wished to support Appenzell to do so. In response, the League raised an army and marched to St. Gallen, before heading toward Appenzell. On 15 May 1403, they entered the pass to Speicher and outside the village of Vögelinsegg met the Appenzell army. A small force of Appenzell and Confederation troops defeated the League army and signed a short lived peace treaty.

Following another Appenzell victory on 17 June 1405, at Stoss Pass on the border of Appenzell town, the new canton continued to expand. During the expansion, Appenzell had even captured the abbot of St Gall and in response they were excommunicated by the Bishop of Constance.

However, while the Bund expanded the Austrians used the peace to regain their strength. On 11 September 1406 an association of nobles formed a knightly order known as the Sankt Jörgenschild (Order of St. George's Shield) to oppose the rebellious commoners of the Bund. Following a defeat at Bregenz, Appenzell was unable to hold the Bund together. The city of St. Gallen and the Canton of Schwyz each paid off the Austrians to avoid an attack, and the Bund was dissolved by King Rupert on 4 April 1408.

As part of the peace treaty, the abbot gave up his ownership of Appenzell, but was still owed certain taxes. However, it was not until 1410 that the area was at peace.

In 1411 Appenzell signed a defensive treaty with the entire Swiss Confederation (except Bern), which strengthened their position against the abbot. Appenzell joined the Confederation as an "Associate Member", and would not become a full member until 1513. Following another battle, in 1429, Appenzell was granted freedom from the obligations in the future. This treaty represented the end of Appenzell's last financial tie to the Abbey of St. Gall, and a movement to closer relationships with the Confederation.

=== Division of Appenzell ===
Starting in 1522, followers of Martin Luther and Huldrych Zwingli began to preach the Protestant Reformation in Appenzell. The early reformers had the most success in the outer Rhoden, a term that in the singular is said to mean a "clearing", and occurs in 1070, long before the final separation. Following the initial small success, in 1523 Joachim von Watt (also known as Joachim Vadian) began to preach the reformed version of the Acts of the Apostles to friends and fellow clergy. His preaching brought the Reformation into the forefront of public debate. In October 1523, the Council supported the Protestant principle of scriptural sermons and on 24 April 1524 Landsgemeinde confirmed the Cantonal Council's decision. However, the work of the Anabaptists in the Appenzell region (as well as in Zürich and St. Gallen) in 1525 led to government crackdowns. The first police action against the Anabaptists took place in June 1525, followed by the Anabaptist Disputation in Teufen in October 1529.

To end the confrontation between the old and new faiths, the Landesgemeinde decided in April 1525, that each parish should choose a faith, but that the principle of free movement would be supported, so that the religious minority could attend the church of their choice regardless of where they lived. The entire Ausserrhoden converted to the Reformation in 1529, with the exception of Herisau, whose Catholic priest, Joseph Forrer, convinced the town to remain with the old faith for the time being, whereas the Innerrhoden remained with the old faith, with the exception of Gais. While the majority of the residents of Appenzell town remained Catholic under Pastor Diepolt Huter, there was a strong Reformed minority. In 1531, the minority were nearly successful in getting the town to ally with the Protestant Ausserrhoden. But an armed mob of angry residents from the neighboring village of Gonten prevented the abolition of the Mass in Appenzell. The Catholic victory in the Second War of Kappel in 1531 ended plans for a reformation of the entire Canton of Appenzell.

After the Second War of Kappel, the two religions reached a generally peaceful parity. They remained united by common business interests, the same political and legal understanding, a shared desire to form an alliance with France and a shared opposition to the city of St. Gallen. This shared opposition to St. Gallen was demonstrated in the so-called linen affairs (1535–42, 1579), where the weavers throughout Appenzell supported each other when they felt that they were unfairly treated by the linen industry of St. Gallen. Nonetheless, divisions over matters of religion and foreign policy, especially with regards to alliances between Catholic and Protestant cantons and the foreign powers of Spain and France, respectively, led to the peaceful partition of the canton in 1597. The terms of partition were arbitrated by representatives of both Catholic cantons (Luzern, Schwyz, Nidwalden) and Protestant cantons (Zürich, Glarus, Schaffhausen).

After this time, the term Kanton Appenzell continued to refer to both half-cantons, although this usage has since become outdated. Usually die beiden Appenzell ("the two Appenzells") are spoken of in a political context, and Appenzellerland in a geographic context, if the aim is to refer to Innerrhoden and Ausserrhoden collectively.

From 1798 to 1803 both Appenzells, with the other domains of the abbot of St Gall, were formed into the canton of Säntis of the Helvetic Republic, but in 1803, on the creation of the new canton of St Gall, shrank back within its former boundaries.

== Geography ==
Appenzellerland is an alpine region, particularly in the south, where the Alpstein limestone range (culminating in the Säntis, with an elevation of 2,504 metres or 8,216 feet) is found, though towards the north the surface is composed rather of green hills, separating green hollows in which nestle neat villages and small towns. It is mainly watered by two streams that descend from the Säntis, the Urnasch joining the Sitter (on which is the capital, Appenzell), which later flows into the Thur. There are trams from Appenzell to St Gallen either through Gais or through Herisau, as well as lines from St Gallen to Trogen and from Rorschach to Heiden.

Since 1597 it has been divided, for religious reasons, into two half-cantons, which are quite independent of each other, and differ in many points. The north and west portion or Ausser Rhoden has a total area of 242 km^{2} (93.6 sq mi), of which 235 km^{2} (90.6 sq mi) are classed as "productive"; forests cover 58 km^{2} (22.5 sq mi) and glaciers 0.098 km^{2} (0.038 sq mi), and its population is mainly German-speaking and Protestant. Its political capital is Trogen, though the largest town is Herisau, while Teufen, and Heiden in the north-east corner is the most frequented of the many goats' whey cure resorts for which the entire canton is famous (Urnäsch and Gais are also in Ausser Rhoden). This half-canton is divided into three administrative districts, comprising twenty communes, and is mainly industrial, the manufacture of cotton goods, muslins, and embroidery being very flourishing. It sends one member (elected by the Landsgemeinde) to the federal Ständerat and three to the federal Nationalrat (elected by a direct popular vote).

The south or more mountainous portion of Appenzell forms the half-canton of Appenzell, Inner Rhoden. It has a total area of 173 km^{2} (66.7 sq mi) (of which 163 km^{2} or 62.8 sq mi are classed as "productive", forests covering 33 km^{2} (12.8 sq mi) and glaciers 0.98 km^{2} (0.38 sq mi)). Its population is almost entirely German-speaking, and predominantly Catholic. Its political capital is Appenzell, which is also the largest village, while Weissbad (near it) and Gonten are the best-known goats' whey cure resorts. Embroidery and muslins are made in this half-canton, though wholly at home by the work-people. But it is very largely pastoral. Inner Rhoden is extremely conservative, and has the reputation of always rejecting any federal Referendum. For similar reasons it has preserved many old customs and costumes, those of the women being very elaborate and picturesque, while the herdsmen have retained their festival attire of red waistcoats, embroidered braces and canary-coloured shorts. Appenzell's annual New Year's Day festivities are still governed by the Julian calendar and are thus currently held on 14 January. It sends one member (named by the Landsgemeinde) to the federal Ständerat, and one also to the federal Nationalrat, while it forms but a single administrative district, though divided into six communes.

== Landsgemeinden ==
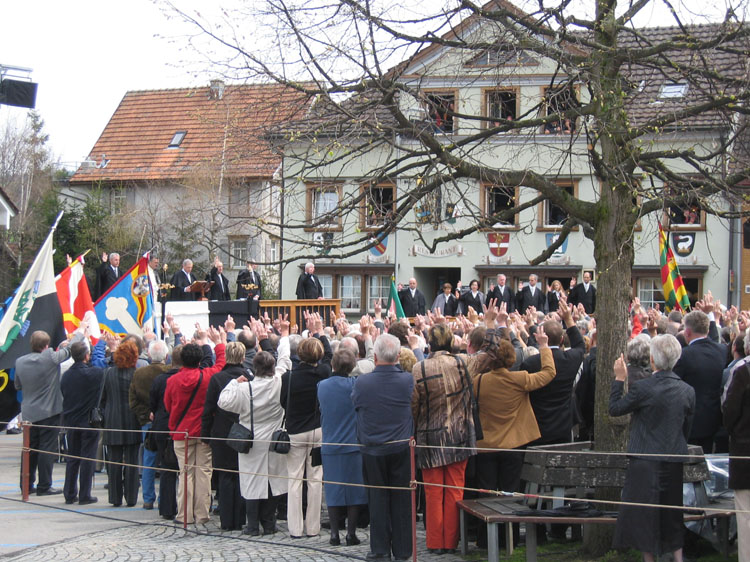
Landesgemeinde from 24 April 2005 in Appenzell Innerrhoden

Both Appenzell cantons had traditions of holding Landsgemeinden, or democratic assemblies held in the open air, in which every male and female citizen (not being disqualified) over twenty years of age must (under a financial penalty) appear personally: each half-canton has such an assembly of its own, that of Inner Rhoden always meeting at Appenzell, and that of Ausser Rhoden in the odd years at Hundwil (near Herisau) and in the even years at Trogen. However, in Ausser Rhoden this institution was abolished by a ballot on 29 September 1997 by 54% of voters (61% of the electorate voted). A measure to reintroduce the institution in 2010 failed, with 70.29% of participating electors voting against it. Landsgemeinden continue to be used in Inner Rhoden, with the closest attempt at abolishing it failing in 1991.

This institution is of immemorial antiquity, and the meetings in either case are always held on the last Sunday in April. The Landsgemeinde is the supreme legislative authority, and elects both the executive (in Inner Rhoden composed of nine members and called Ständekommission, and in Ausser Rhoden of seven members and called Regierungsrat) and the president or Landammann; in each half-canton there is also a sort of standing committee (composed of the members of the executive and representatives from the communes—in Inner Rhoden one member per 250 or fraction over 125 of the population, and in Ausser Rhoden one member per 1000 of the inhabitants) which prepares business for the Landsgemeinde and decides minor matters; in Inner Rhoden it is named the Grossrat and in Ausser Rhoden the Kantonsrat. As various old-fashioned ceremonies are observed at the meetings and the members each appear with his girded sword, the sight of a meeting of the Landsgemeinde is most striking and interesting. The existing constitution of Inner Rhoden dates mainly from 1872, and that of Ausser Rhoden from 1876.

The oldest codes of the laws and customs of the land (Landbücher) date from about 1540 and 1585, the original manuscript of the latter (called the "Silver Book" from its silver clasps) being still used in Inner Rhoden when, at the beginning of the annual Landsgemeinde, the newly elected Landammann first takes the oath of office, and the assembled members then take that of obedience to him, in either case with uplifted right hands.

In fact there are two Landamann: a so-called Regierender Landaman (acting Landamann) and a Stillstehender Landamann (vice Landamann). The terms are for two years and will switch between them after the two year, but they have to be confirmed every year by the voters. In particular the Regierender Landaman has to be confirmed by the voters by actually voting. This actually leaves the voters with the possibility to drop any member of the government during the Landsgemeinde and select someone else.

== See also ==
- Appenzeller Sennenhund
- Appenzeller cheese
- Zäuerli
