= Franzl Lang =

German yodeler (1930–2015)

Franz Lang
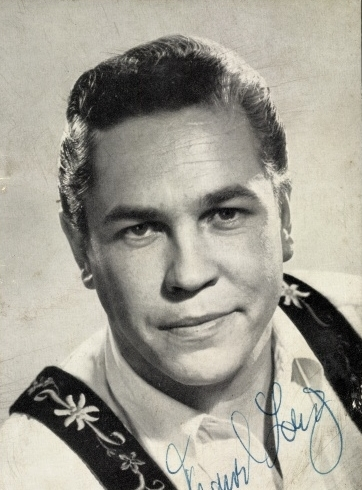

Background information
- Birth name: Franz Lang
- Also known as: Yodelking (Jodlerkönig)
- Born: 28 December 1930; Munich, Bavaria, Weimar Republic
- Died: 6 December 2015 (aged 84); Munich, Bavaria, Germany
- Years active: 1957–2000
- Labels: Universal Music GmbH

Franz "Franzl" Lang (28 December 1930 – 6 December 2015), known as the Yodel King (German: Jodlerkönig), was an alpine yodeller from Bavaria, Germany. Lang's genre was German folk music; and he typically sang in the Bavarian dialect of the rural Alpine regions.

== Career ==
Raised in Munich, Lang trained as a toolmaker. He started playing his trademark accordion at the age of nine. His greatest hit was his 1968 recording of Karl Ganzer's composition "Das Kufsteiner Lied". Throughout the 1970s, he was a fixture on musical variety shows on West German television, especially on the ZDF program Lustige Musikanten.

Lang sold more than 10 million recordings, and earned 20 gold records and one platinum record within the German recording industry.

On his 70th birthday, he performed for the final time.

== Personal life ==
He was married to his wife Johanna since 1954; he had one son (Franz Herbert Lang, 1966–1995) and one daughter (Christl). He died at a Munich nursing home on 6 December 2015 from Multiple organ dysfunction syndrome. On 11 January 2016 he was buried in Munich Waldfriedhof, a forest cemetery, with multiple dedications from his family and friends.

== Discography (Albums) ==
- 1970: Bergweihnacht (LP: Philips 63 883, Aufnahme: 1970)
- 1977: Urlaub in den Bergen
- 1979: Musik aus den Bergen
- 1987: Schön ist's auf der Welt
- 1991: Mir geht's guat
- 1996: Freude am Leben
- Alpen-Echo
- Das original Kufsteiner Lied
- Der Königsjodler
- Die schönsten Volkslieder
- Die schönsten Jodler der Welt
- Echo der Berge
- Freunde der Berge
- Goldene Sonne, goldene Berge
- Himmel, Harsch und Firn mit den Kaiserlich Böhmischen
- Holladaratata
- In Oberkrain
- Jodlerkönig
- Kameraden der Berge
- Komm mit in die Berge
- Lagerfeuer in den Bergen
- Ski Heil
- Stimmung beim Bier
- Stimmung beim Jodlerwirt
- Wir kommen von den Bergen
- Zillertal, du bist mei Freud
- Tirol Heimat der Berge
- 10 Jahre Jubiläum beim Jodlerwirt
- Im Wilden Westen
- Grüß Gott in Bayern
- Zünftig pfundig kreuzfidel
- Das Bayernland
- Der weißblaue Hammer

== Filmography ==
- 1956: Salzburger Geschichten
- 1961: Drei weiße Birken
- 1961: Der Orgelbauer von St. Marien
- 1961: Schlagerrevue 1962
- 1962: Tanze mit mir in den Morgen
- 1962: Drei Liebesbriefe aus Tirol
